= Turgay Şeren =

Turkish footballer (1932–2016)

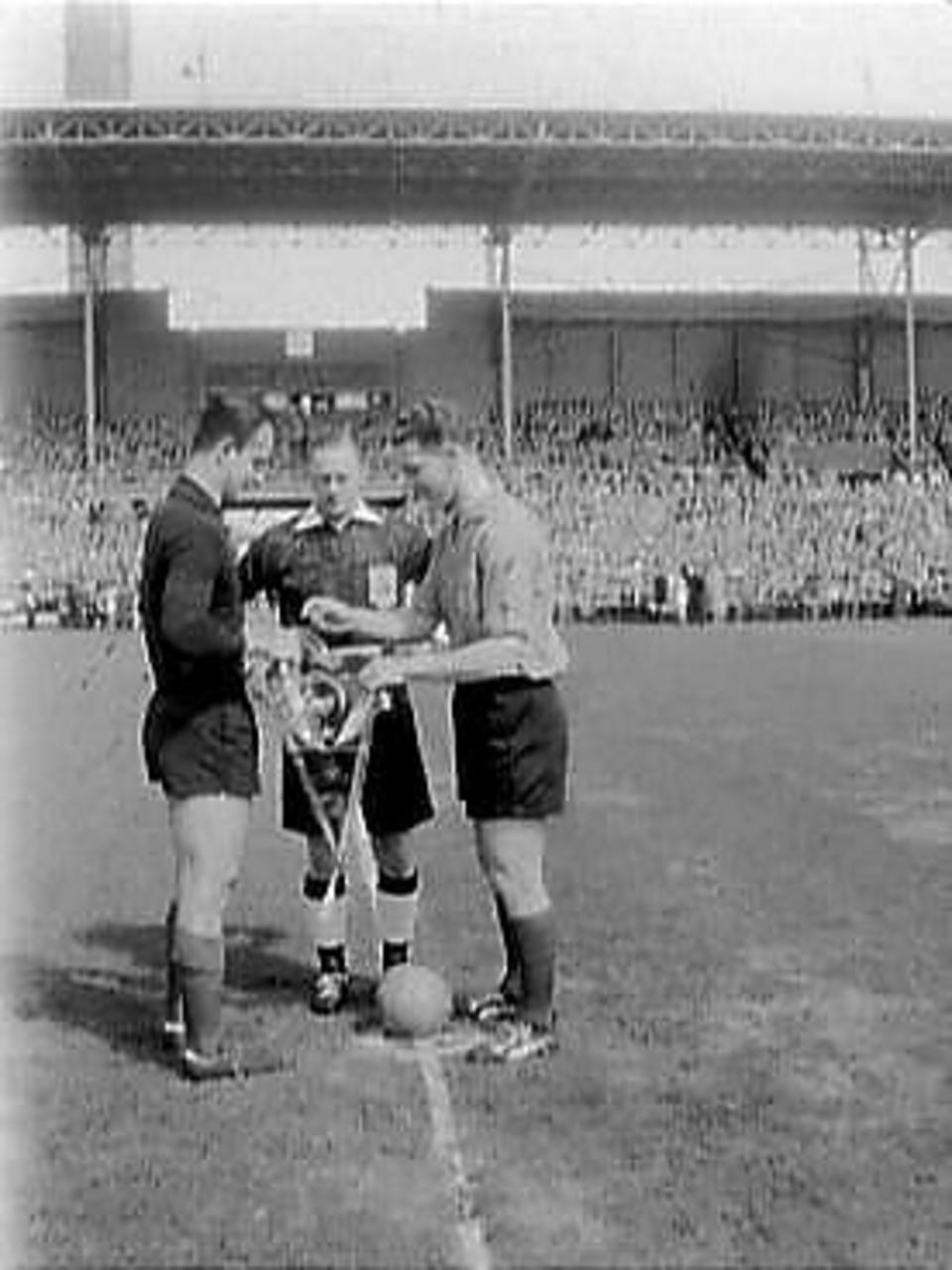
- Turgay Şeren (left) in 1958

Personal information
- Full name: Turkay Sabit Şeren
- Date of birth: 15 May 1932
- Place of birth: Ankara, Turkey
- Date of death: 7 July 2016 (aged 84)
- Place of death: Istanbul, Turkey
- Position: Goalkeeper

Senior career*
Years	Team	Apps	(Gls)
1947–1967	Galatasaray SK	631	(0)

International career
1950–1966	Turkey	52	(0)

Managerial career
- 1968–1969: Mersin İdmanyurdu
- 1969–1970: Vefa S.K.
- 1970–1971: Samsunspor
- 1979–1980: Galatasaray SK
- * Club domestic league appearances and goals

Turkay Sabit Şeren (15 May 1932 – 7 July 2016) was a Turkish football player, who was a one-time goalkeeper of Galatasaray. He played for Galatasaray between 1947 and 1966 and was capped 52 times for Turkey, including two matches at the 1954 FIFA World Cup. Because of his saves against West Germany in 1951 in Berlin, he is nicknamed as "Berlin Panteri" (Panther of Berlin). He also coached Galatasaray. Şeren was awarded a testimonial match by the club in 1967 in Istanbul, inviting players like Ion Pârcălab, Lev Yashin and Ion Nunweiller.

After his retirement, Şeren became a football columnist and a television commentator.

He died at age 84 on 7 July 2016.

== Career statistics ==
=== Club ===
Club	Season	League		Cup		League Cup		Europe		Total	
Club	Season	Apps	Goals	Apps	Goals	Apps	Goals	Apps	Goals	Apps	Goals
Galatasaray SK	1946–47	1	0	-	-	-	-	-	-	1	0
Galatasaray SK	1947–48	1	0	-	-	-	-	-	-	1	0
Galatasaray SK	1948–49	1	0	-	-	-	-	-	-	1	0
Galatasaray SK	1949–50	20	0	-	-	-	-	-	-	20	0
Galatasaray SK	1950–51	12	0	-	-	-	-	-	-	12	0
Galatasaray SK	1951–52	14	0	-	-	-	-	-	-	14	0
Galatasaray SK	1952–53	16	0	-	-	-	-	-	-	16	0
Galatasaray SK	1953–54	14	0	-	-	-	-	-	-	14	0
Galatasaray SK	1954–55	15	0	-	-	-	-	-	-	15	0
Galatasaray SK	1955–56	15	0	-	-	-	-	-	-	15	0
Galatasaray SK	1956–57	18	0	-	-	-	-	2	0	20	0
Galatasaray SK	1957–58	18	0	-	-	-	-	-	-	18	0
Galatasaray SK	1958–59	7	0	-	-	-	-	-	-	7	0
Galatasaray SK	1959	8	0	-	-	-	-	-	-	8	0
Galatasaray SK	1959–60	34	0	-	-	-	-	-	-	34	0
Galatasaray SK	1960–61	33	0	-	-	-	-	-	-	33	0
Galatasaray SK	1961–62	36	0	-	-	-	-	-	-	36	0
Galatasaray SK	1962–63	22	0	7	0	3	0	6	0	38	0
Galatasaray SK	1963–64	28	0	6	0	-	-	5	-	39	0
Galatasaray SK	1964–65	7	0	-	-	-	-	-	-	7	0
Galatasaray SK	1965–66	22	0	3	0	-	-	-	-	25	0
Galatasaray SK	1966–67	10	0	1	0	-	-	-	-	11	0
Career total		352	0	17	0	3	0	13	0	385	0

== Honours ==
=== As player ===
==== Galatasaray ====
- Süper Lig: 1961–62, 1962–63
- Turkish Cup: 1962–63, 1963–64, 1964–65, 1965–66
- Turkish Super Cup: 1966
- Istanbul Football League: 1948–49, 1954–55, 1955–56, 1957–58
- TSYD Cup: 1963, 1966

== Records ==
- Most appearances for Galatasaray SK (631)
- Most appearances at Kıtalar Arası Derbi (54)
- Most total seasons as Galatasaray SK 1st Goalkeeper (15)

== See also ==
- List of one-club men
- List of Galatasaray S.K. records and statistics

Sporting positions
Preceded by İsfendiyar Açıksöz	Galatasaray S.K. Captain; 1960–1967	Succeeded by Metin Oktay
