= Garbis İstanbulluoğlu =

Turkish footballer & coach (1927–1994)

Personal information
- Full name: Garbis İstanbulluoğlu
- Date of birth: 24 February 1927
- Place of birth: Istanbul, Turkey
- Date of death: 17 February 1994 (aged 66)
- Place of death: Istanbul, Turkey
- Height: 1.77 m (5 ft 9 1/2 in)
- Position: Forward

Senior career*
Years	Team	Apps	(Gls)
1947–1950	Kadırgaspor		
1950–1957	Vefa S.K.	90	(52)
1957–1960	Taksim SK		

International career
1952–1953	Turkey	4	(3)
- * Club domestic league appearances and goals

Garbis İstanbulluoğlu (24 February 1927 – 17 February 1994), known as with his given nickname Tenekeci Gabris, - literally meaning "Tinsmith", was a former Turkish football player and coach.

== Early life ==
Of Armenian origin, he was born in Kadırga neighbourhood of Fatih, Istanbul. His father was a tinsmith and Garbis was called "Tenekeci Garbis", by fans and the press, because of his father's profession (Tenekeci is Turkish for tinsmith).

== Career ==
İstanbulluoğlu began playing football with Kadırgaspor, his local team. He joined Vefa S.K. in 1950, where he played in 90 games scoring 52 goals. He also played for Taksim SK for three seasons. He played as a striker.

=== National team ===
İstanbulluoğlu was the first Armenian origin footballer that represented Turkey. He was first capped for Turkey on 1 June 1952 in Ankara against Switzerland, scoring in his debut. He was capped by Turkey for four times, scoring three goals. He also played for Turkey against Italy (B) side on 11 December 1953 in Istanbul. However, this game is not considered an official game for FIFA.

=== Coaching ===
Started his managerial career with Taksim SK. In the 1967–68 season he was assistant manager of Mehmet Ali Has when Taksim SK at the Turkish 2. Division. Following year, he was appointed to as a technical director (manager) of Taksim SK until 1974 when the team relegated to Amateur League from Turkish 3. Division. He was also manager of Şişli SK. Both teams represented the Armenian community in Istanbul.

=== Death ===
İstanbulluoğlu died on 17 February 1994 in Istanbul and buried in Şişli Armenian Cemetery.

== Statistics ==
=== Club ===
Club	Season	League	
Club	Season	Apps	Goals
Vefa S.K.	1950–51	12	7
Vefa S.K.	1951–52	13	8
Vefa S.K.	1952–53	13	8
Vefa S.K.	1953–54	16	13
Vefa S.K.	1954–55	17	11
Vefa S.K.	1955–56	12	2
Vefa S.K.	1956–57	17	3
Vefa S.K.	Total	90	52

=== International ===
National team	Year	Apps	Goals	Assists
Turkey	1952	2	1	-
Turkey	1953	2	2	-
Total		4	3	-
