= Eşref Özmenç =

Turkish footballer

Personal information
- Full name: Eşref Özmenç
- Date of birth: 30 January 1930
- Place of birth: Istanbul, Turkey
- Date of death: 1 January 1990 (aged 59)
- Place of death: Istanbul
- Position: Sweeper

Youth career
- Kadırga S.K.
- 1947–1948: Beşiktaş J.K. Football Academy

Senior career*
Years	Team	Apps	(Gls)
1948–1957	Beşiktaş J.K.	112	(9)
1957–1961	Vefa S.K.	65	(0)

International career
1951–1952	Turkey U-21	4	(0)
1950–1953	Turkey B	2	(0)
1951–1954	Turkey	8	(0)
- * Club domestic league appearances and goals

Eşref Özmenç (30 January 1930 – 1 January 1990) was a Turkish international association football player, who most notably was a part of Beşiktaş J.K. squad between the late 1940s and 1950s. He represented Turkey at senior level, earning 8 caps between 1951 and 1954.

== Career ==
Started his career at Istanbul-based Kadırga S.K., Özmenç joined Beşiktaş J.K. Football Academy in 1947 and promoted to senior section following year. He earned 239 appearances for the club, scoring 9 goals across all competitions between 1948 and 1957.

== Style of play and reception ==
According to Beşiktaş official website, Özmenç was noted a player with pace, "good" ball technique and described as a "resilient" player. He was one of 33 players listed "Centennial squad" of the club, placing himself in "bronze eleven", selected after a survey held between the official club members in 2003, centennial year of the club.

== Honours ==
Beşiktaş

- Istanbul Football League: 1949–50, 1950–51, 1951–52, 1953–54
- Turkish Federation Cup: 1956–57

=== Individual ===
- Beşiktaş J.K. Squads of Century (Bronze Team)
