= Fahrettin Cansever =

Turkish association football player (1930–1987)

Personal information
- Full name: Fahrettin Cansever
- Date of birth: 1 January 1930
- Place of birth: Tekirdağ, Turkey
- Date of death: 1 June 1987 (aged 57)
- Place of death: Istanbul, Turkey
- Position: Midfielder

Senior career*
Years	Team	Apps	(Gls)
1945	İzmit Kağıtspor		
- Eskişehir Havagücü
1948–1949	Beykoz	13	(4)
1949–1955	Beşiktaş	45	(19)
1955–1957	Beykoz	35	(12)
1958–1959	Fatih Karagümrük	21	(0)
1959–1960	Ankaragücü	26	(3)

International career
1949–1954	Turkey	5	(3)
1950	Turkey U-21	2	(0)
1951	Turkey B	1	(0)

Managerial career
- 1961–1965: Şekerspor
- 1965–1966: Mersin İY
- 1966: Beykoz
- 1967–1968: Zonguldakspor
- 1968: Kocaelispor
- 1968: Balıkesirspor
- 1968: Samsunspor
- 1968: Fatih Karagümrük
- 1969: Konyaspor
- 1969–1970: Düzcespor
- 1971–1972: Edirnespor
- 1972–1974: Beykoz
- 1974–1975: Konyaspor
- 1975: Galata SK
- * Club domestic league appearances and goals

Fahrettin Cansever (1 January 1930 – 1 June 1987) was a Turkish international association football player and manager.

== Career ==
=== International career ===
On 20 November 1949, Turkey played the qualifying encounter against Syria where their beat their opponents by 7–0 final score, including a hat-trick of Fahrettin Cansever, and qualified for 1950 FIFA World Cup, under management of Cihat Arman.

== Honours ==
Beşiktaş J.K.

- Istanbul Football League (3): 1949–50, 1950–51, 1953–54
