= 1958–59 Beşiktaş J.K. season =

Beşiktaş J.K.
1958–59 season
- President: (Turkey) Nuri Togay
- Manager: (Italy) Leandro Remondini / (Turkey) Hüseyin Saygun
- Istanbul Football League: 5th
- European Cup: First Round (eliminated)

The 1958–59 season was the club's 40th official season and their 56th year in existence. The club participated in the final season of the Istanbul Football League finishing in 5th place, behind Fenerbahçe, Galatasaray, Karagümrük and İstanbulspor. By finishing in the top 8, the team qualified for the inaugural season of the new national league; Turkish First Football League. By winning the Turkish Federation Cup a season ago Beşiktaş qualified for the European Cup, but lost to Real Madrid 1-3 on aggregate (0-2 away, 1-1 home) in the first round. Real Madrid however would go on to win the cup for a 4th time. Beşiktaş was placed into the "White Group" along with Fenerbahçe, Altay, Izmirspor, Ankaragücü, Hacettepe, Beykoz and İstanbulspor. Beşiktaş finished 2nd place behind Fenerbahçe missing the final match, where Fenerbahçe would beat Galatasaray for the title.

== Istanbul Football League ==
Beşiktaş played in the final season of the Istanbul Football League. They finished 5th.

Pos	Team	Pld	W	D	L	GF	GA	GD	Pts	Qualification
3	Fatih Karagümrük S.K.	18	9	3	6	27	25	+2	21	Qualified for the Turkish National League
4	İstanbulspor	18	6	7	5	19	19	0	19	Qualified for the Turkish National League
5	Beşiktaş J.K.	18	8	2	8	28	26	+2	18	Qualified for the Turkish National League
6	Beykoz 1908 S.K.D.	18	6	6	6	23	29	−6	18	Qualified for the Turkish National League
7	Adalet SK	18	5	5	8	16	31	−15	15	Qualified for the Turkish National League

== Turkish First Football League ==
In the first season of the Turkish First Football League (now Turkish Super League), Beşiktaş finished 2nd behind Fenerbahçe, thereby failing to qualify for the final.

=== Results ===
Home \ Away	ADA	ADS	GAL	GEN	GÖZ	KAG	KRŞ	VEF
Adalet		0–0	0–1	2–3	0–0	0–0	0–0	1–1
Ankara Demirspor	2–1		0–2	0–0	1–1	0–0	1–0	1–1
Galatasaray	2–1	1–2		0–0	5–0	1–0	1–1	0–0
Gençlerbirliği	1–1	0–0	0–0		2–2	1–2	1–1	0–3
Göztepe	2–3	4–2	0–0	2–1		3–0	3–2	0–1
Karagümrük	3–0	1–2	2–3	1–0	1–1		2–2	1–2
Karşıyaka	3–1	1–1	0–1	1–1	1–1	0–3		2–0
Vefa	2–2	0–0	1–1	3–0	3–2	1–0	3–0	

Legend: Blue = home team win; Yellow = draw; Red = away team win.

== White group ==
=== Season ===
Beşiktaş (Turkey)	0–2	(Turkey) Fenerbahçe	Istanbul, Turkey
			Stadium: Dolmabahçe Stadium

Altay (Turkey)	3–1	(Turkey) Beşiktaş	İzmir, Turkey
			Stadium: İzmir Alsancak Stadium

Beşiktaş (Turkey)	2–0	(Turkey) İzmirspor	Istanbul, Turkey
			Stadium: Dolmabahçe Stadium

Ankaragücü (Turkey)	1–3	(Turkey) Beşiktaş	Ankara, Turkey
			Stadium: Ankara 19 Mayıs Stadium

Beşiktaş (Turkey)	3–2	(Turkey) Hacettepe	Istanbul, Turkey
			Stadium: Dolmabahçe Stadium

Beykoz 1908 (Turkey)	2–3	(Turkey) Beşiktaş	Istanbul, Turkey
			Stadium: Dolmabahçe Stadium

Beşiktaş (Turkey)	2–1	(Turkey) İstanbulspor	Istanbul, Turkey
			Stadium: Dolmabahçe Stadium

Fenerbahçe (Turkey)	1–0	(Turkey) Beşiktaş	Istanbul, Turkey
			Stadium: Fenerbahçe Stadium

Beşiktaş (Turkey)	2–1	(Turkey) Altay	Istanbul, Turkey
			Stadium: Dolmabahçe Stadium

İzmirspor (Turkey)	1–1	(Turkey) Beşiktaş	İzmir, Turkey
			Stadium: İzmir Alsancak Stadium

Beşiktaş (Turkey)	0–0	(Turkey) Ankaragücü	Istanbul, Turkey
			Stadium: Dolmabahçe Stadium

Hacettepe (Turkey)	0–3	(Turkey) Beşiktaş	Ankara, Turkey
			Stadium: Ankara 19 Mayıs Stadium

Beşiktaş (Turkey)	0–1	(Turkey) Beykoz 1908	Istanbul, Turkey
			Stadium: Dolmabahçe Stadium

İstanbulspor (Turkey)	1–2	(Turkey) Beşiktaş	Istanbul, Turkey
			Stadium: Dolmabahçe Stadium

== European Cup ==
Beşiktaş became the first Turkish team to qualify for the European Cup. They qualified in 1957 but the Turkish Football Federation didn't send their name for the draw, therefore being disqualified. They beat Olympiacos F.C. in the preliminary round by a w/o because Olympiacos withdrew from the competition. In the first round they played the defending champions Real Madrid. In the first leg Beşiktaş lost 0-2 and in the second leg they tied 1-1. Real Madrid won 3-1 on the aggregate.

=== Preliminary round ===
Beşiktaş (Turkey)	w/o	(Greece) Olympiacos

=== First round ===
November 13, 1958	Real Madrid (Spain)	2 – 0	(Turkey) Beşiktaş	Madrid, Spain
	Santisteban 57'; Kopa 90'			Stadium: Estadio Santiago Bernabéu; Attendance: 60,000; Referee: Pietro Bonetto (Italy)

November 27, 1958	Beşiktaş (Turkey)	1 – 1	(Spain) Real Madrid	Istanbul, Turkey
	Köstepen 64'		Santisteban 13'	Stadium: Mithatpaşa Stadium; Attendance: 30,000; Referee: Cesare Jonni (Italy)

Beşiktaş lost 1-3 on aggregate.
