= Şevket Yorulmaz =

Turkish football coach and former player

Personal information
- Date of birth: 1925
- Place of birth: Konya, Turkey
- Date of death: 8 August 1997 (aged 71–72)
- Place of death: Istanbul, Turkey
- Position: Forward

Youth career
- Konya İdman Yurdu

Senior career*
| Years | Team | Apps | (Gls) |
- Konya İdman Yurdu
| 1947–1954 | Beşiktaş | 173 | (99) |
| Total | | 173 | (99) |

International career
| 1950–1952 | Turkey | 3 | (0) |
| 1950 | Turkey A2 | 1 | (0) |
| 1952 | Turkey U21 | 3 | (0) |
- * Club domestic league appearances and goals

Şevket Yorulmaz (1925 – 8 August 1997) was a Turkish footballer who played as a forward. Known for his career in Beşiktaş, he was the top goal scorer of Beşiktaş during the 1950s, especially in the Istanbul derbies.

== Early life and junior career ==
Yorulmaz was born in Konya in 1925. He first started playing football as a student, playing in unbuilt in plots of land in the city of Konya. He continued playing during his military service in Antalya, first joining Jandarmagücü (a local team for servicemen in Antalya). His talents then led to him being transferred to Ankara to play in the military-affiliated Muhafızgücü. It was here that Yorulmaz was noticed by scouts from Beşiktaş.

== Career ==
Yorulmaz joined Beşiktaş in 1947 and played as a centre-forward. He played with Beşiktaş until 1954 in a total of 173 games, garnering four Istanbul Football League championships and scoring a total of 99 goals. He was the top scorer of this league in 1951–52 and 1952–53, scoring 14 goals in 12 games in 1952. He also played internationally for Turkey, both for the U21 and the senior national team, appearing in international football on a total of seven occasions.

He then went on to play in Acar İdman Yurdu, where he retired as a footballer. A testimonial match was organised in his honour on 9 June 1968, with a team consisting of former footballers from Bursa defeating former Beşiktaş footballers 1–0. During the match, Yorulmaz was given awards by the Beşiktaş President Talat Asal as well Bursaspor.

== Post-retirement ==
After his retirement, he became the manager of Bursa Merinosspor.

In his later years, he became involved in the management of Beşiktaş, opposing the club administration in 1979. He enjoyed close ties with Süleyman Seba, the club president in the 1980s and 1990s, and went on to serve as an executive for the team. He died on 8 August 1997 in Kuşadası, where he had been holidaying, and was interred in the Zincirlikuyu Cemetery.

== Honours ==
Beşiktaş

- Istanbul Football League: 1949–50, 1950–51, 1952, 1953–54
- Turkish National Division: 1947
- Turkish Football Championship: 1951
