= List of Galatasaray S.K. footballers =

The following is a list of Galatasaray S.K footballers based in Istanbul, Turkey.

== Key ==
- The list is ordered first by date of debut, and then if necessary in alphabetical order.
- Appearances as a substitute are included.
- Statistics are correct up to and including the match played on 21 November 2026. Where a player left the club permanently after this date, his statistics are updated to his date of leaving.

Positions key
Pre-1960s		1960s–	
GK	Goalkeeper		
FB	Full back	DF	Defender
HB	Half back	MF	Midfielder
FW	Forward		

Nationality
Unless otherwise noted, the nationality of a player is determined by the country/countries which he has played for, or if said person has not played international football, their country of birth.
Position
Playing positions are listed according to the tactical formations that were employed at the time. Thus the change in the names of defensive and midfield positions reflects the tactical evolution that occurred from the 1960s onwards.
Club career
Club career is defined as the first and last calendar years in which the player appeared for the club in any of the competitions listed below.
Total appearances and Total goals
Total appearances and goals comprise those in the Atatürk Cup, Istanbul Football Cup, Istanbul Football League, Istanbul Friday League, Istanbul Shield, Prime Minister's Cup, Süper Lig, Turkish Football Championship, Turkish Cup, Turkish Super Cup, TSYD Cup, European Cup/UEFA Champions League, UEFA Cup/UEFA Europa League, Inter-Cities Fairs Cup, UEFA Cup Winners' Cup, UEFA Super Cup and FIFA Club World Cup. Matches; wartime matches are regarded as unofficial and are excluded, as are matches from the abandoned 1939–40 season.

== Players ==
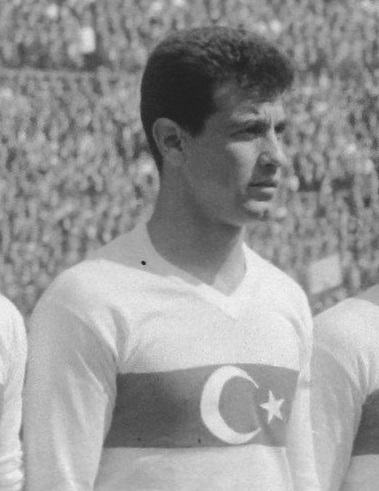
Record goalscorer Metin Oktay, who was also captain from 1967 to 1969.

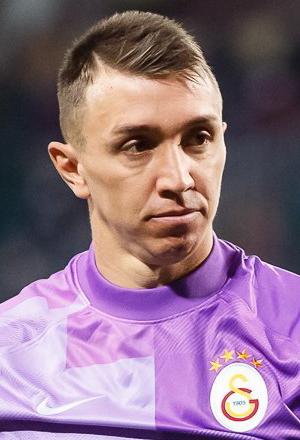
Fernando Muslera played 549 matches for Galatasaray and won a total of 19 trophies. (record)

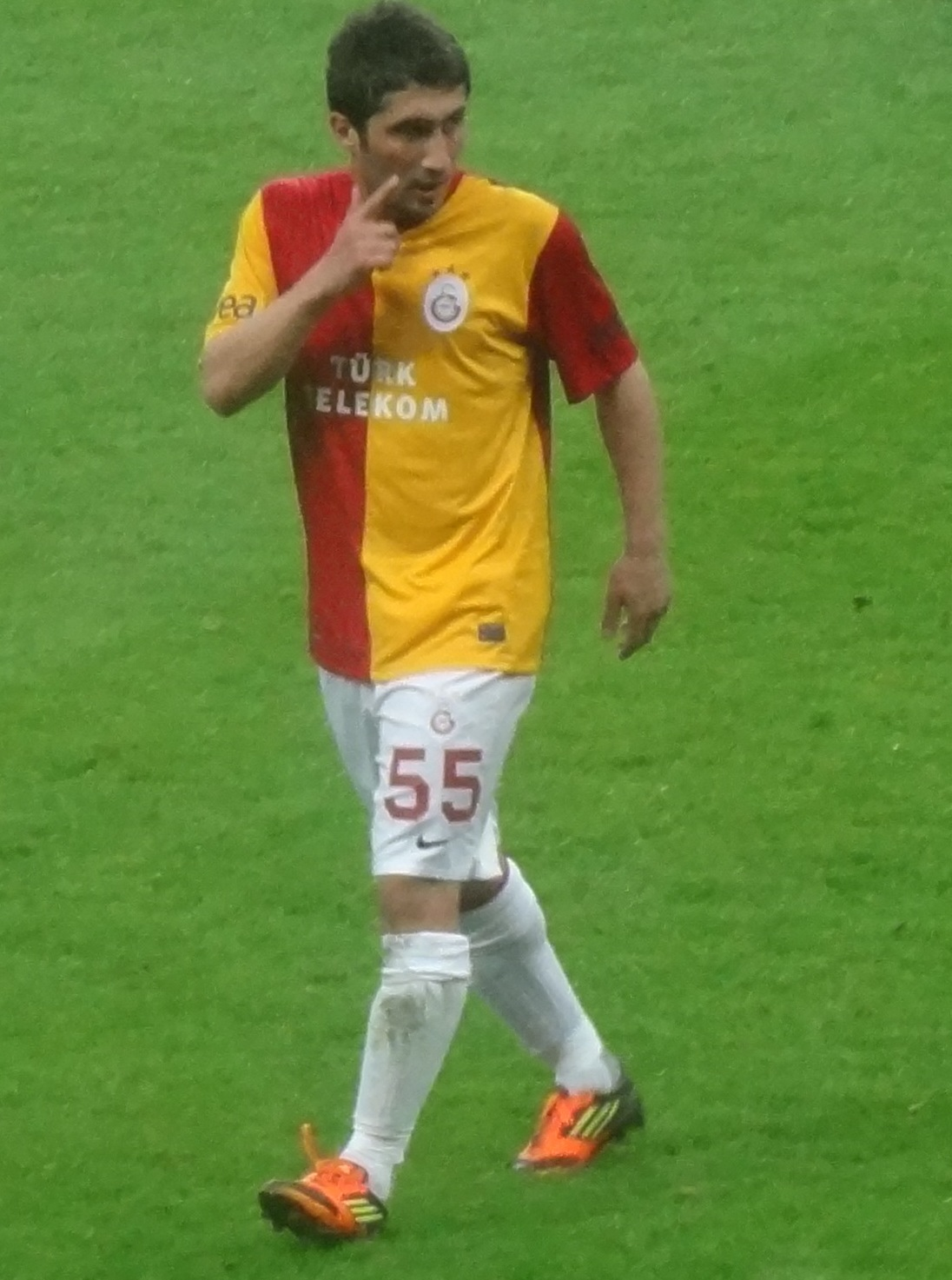
Sabri Sarıoğlu made 475 appearances for Galatasaray

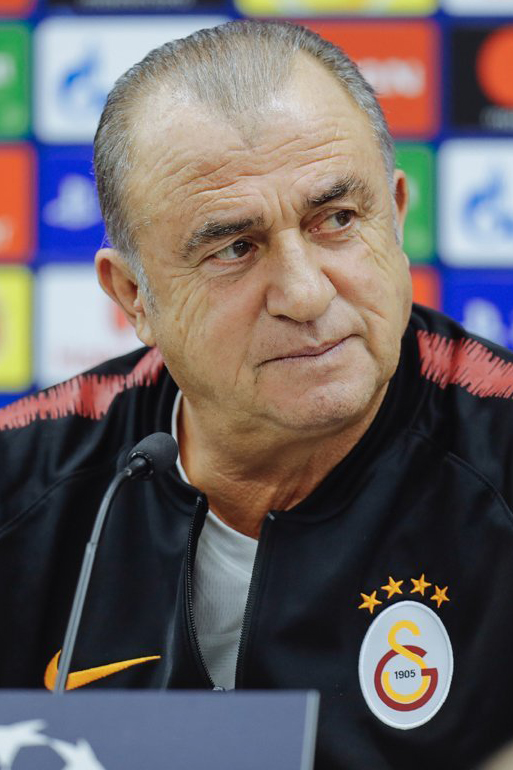
Fatih Terim made 434 appearances for Galatasaray and is the former Head Coach

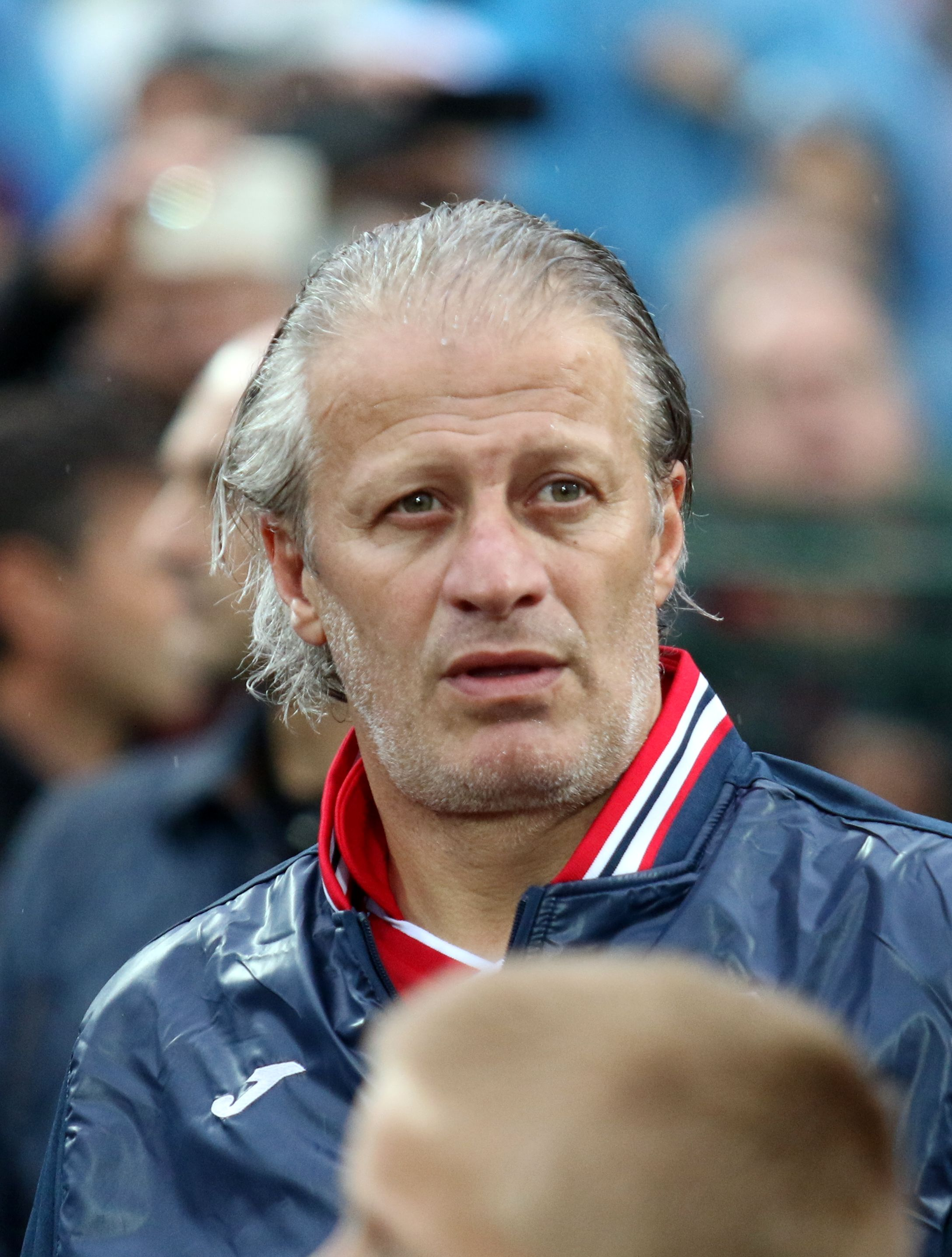
Tugay Kerimoğlu made 418 appearances for Galatasaray

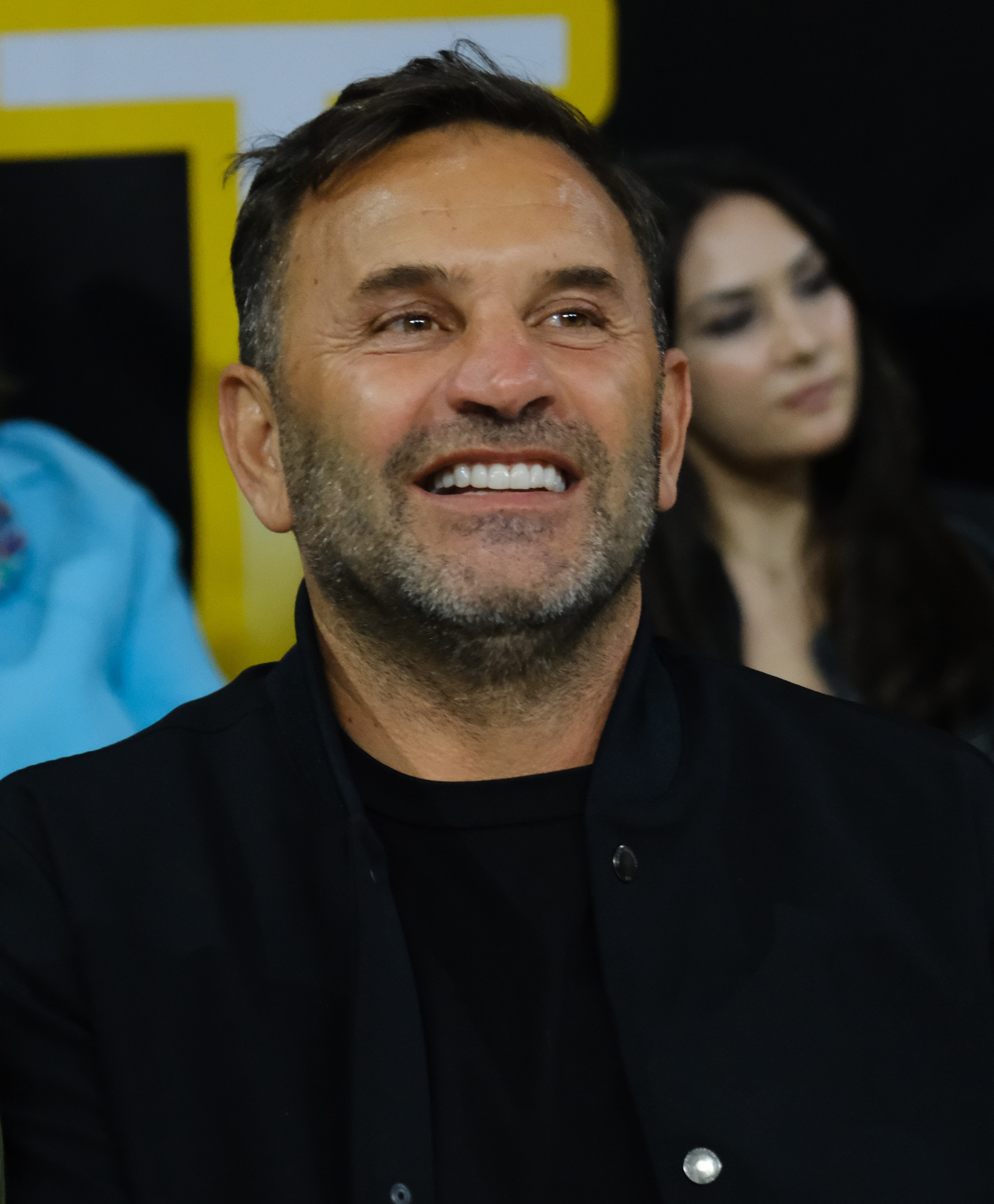
Okan Buruk played 315 matches from 1991 to 2008

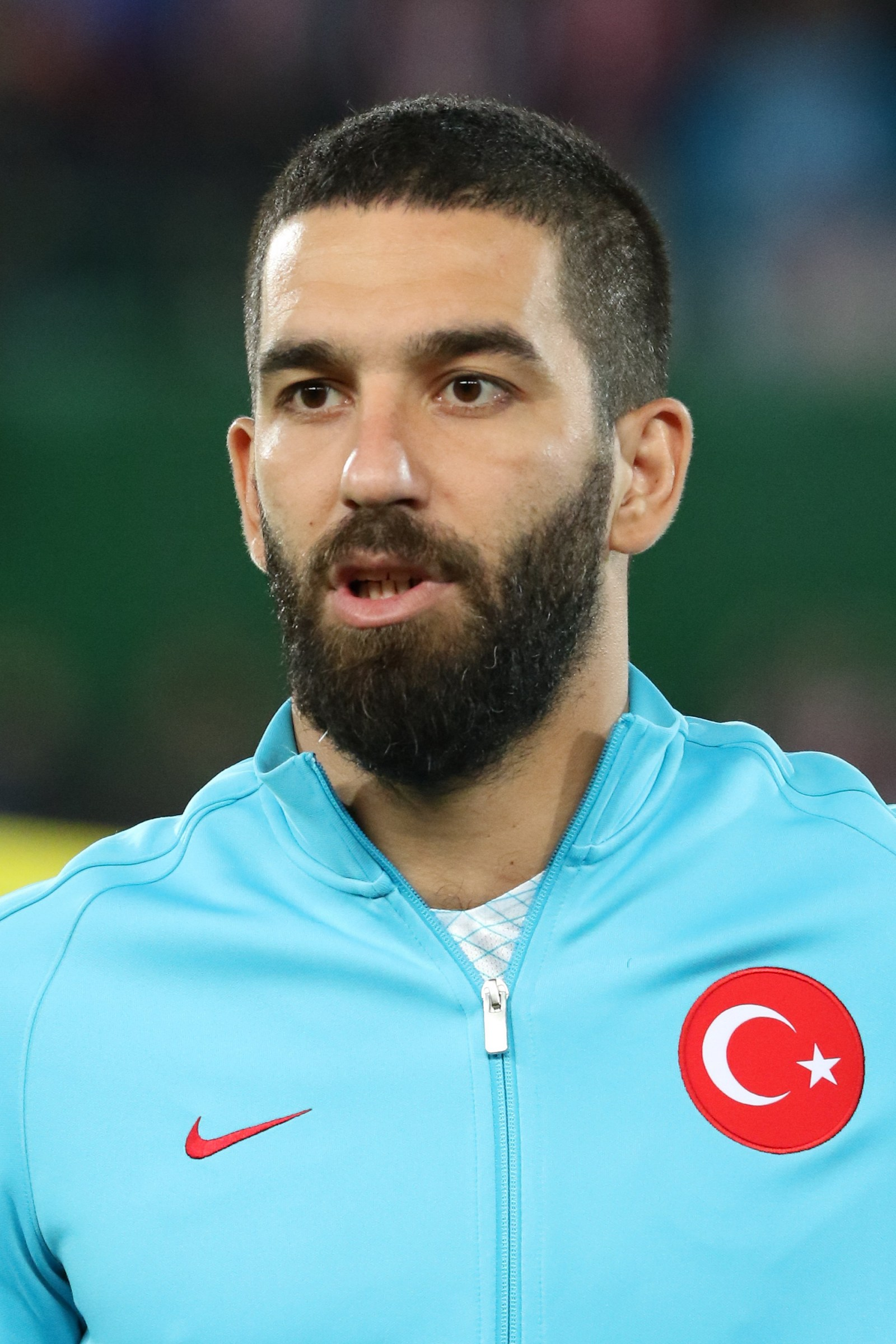
Arda Turan made 235 appearances for Galatasaray

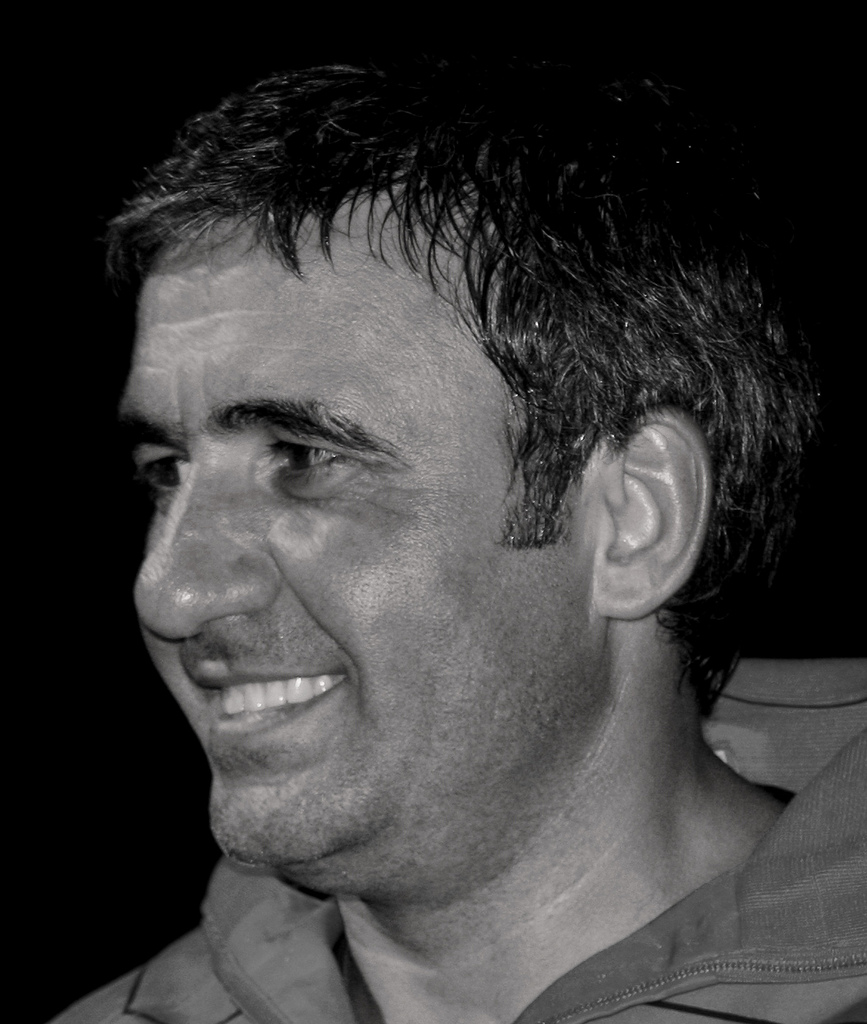
Gheorghe Hagi made 196 appearances for Galatasaray

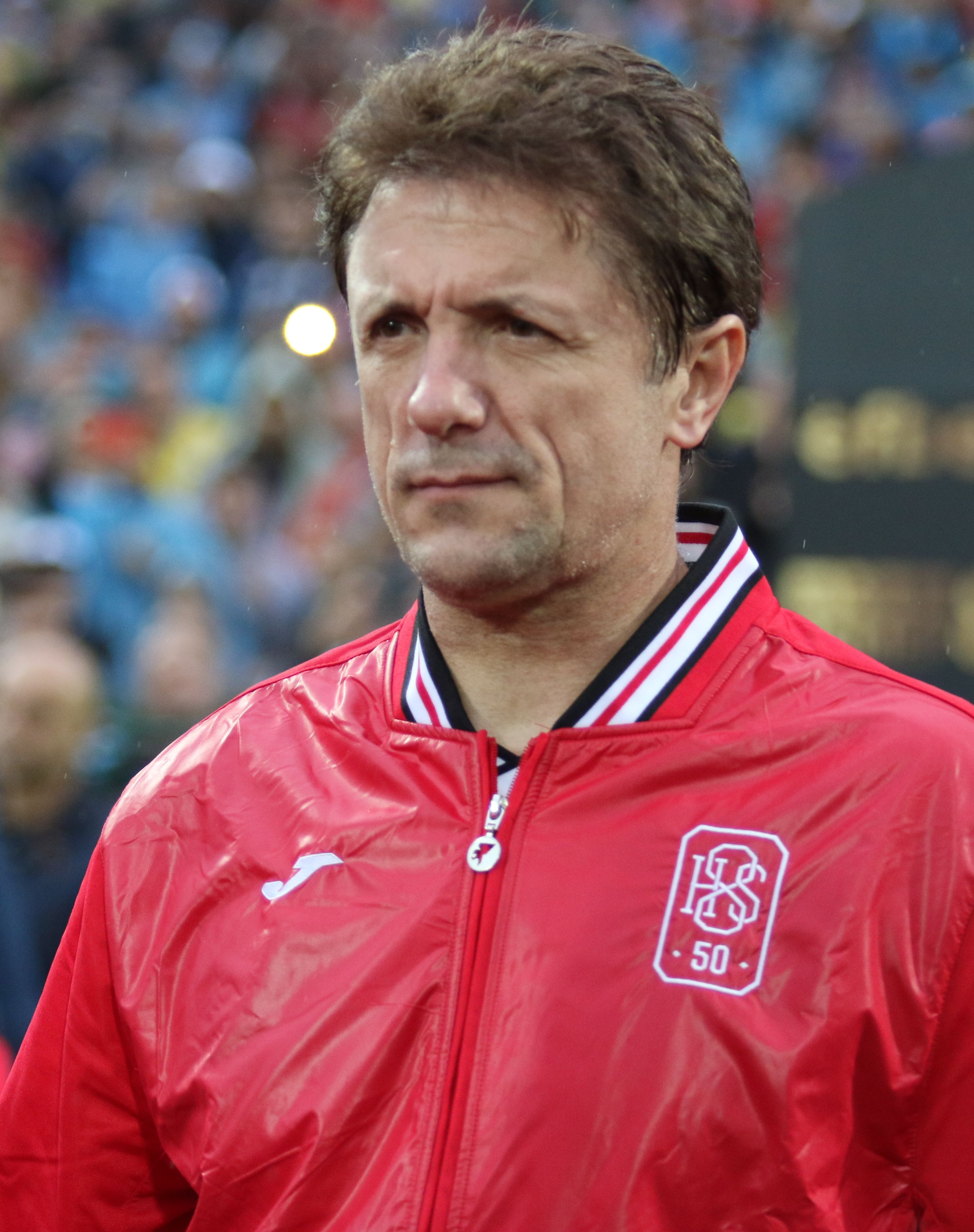
Gheorghe Popescu made 181 appearances for Galatasaray

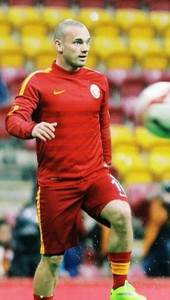
Wesley Sneijder made 175 appearances for Galatasaray

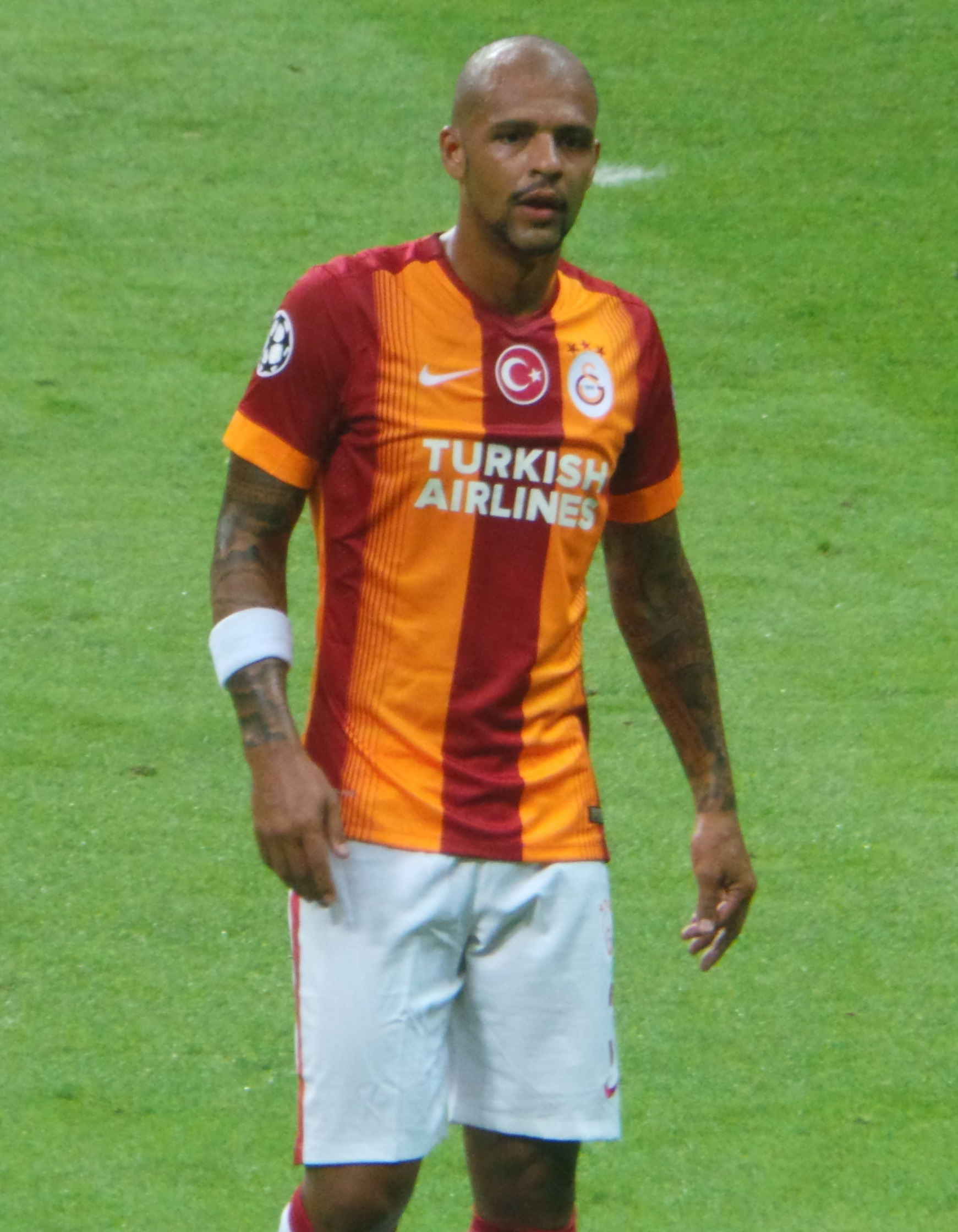
Felipe Melo made 155 appearances for Galatasaray

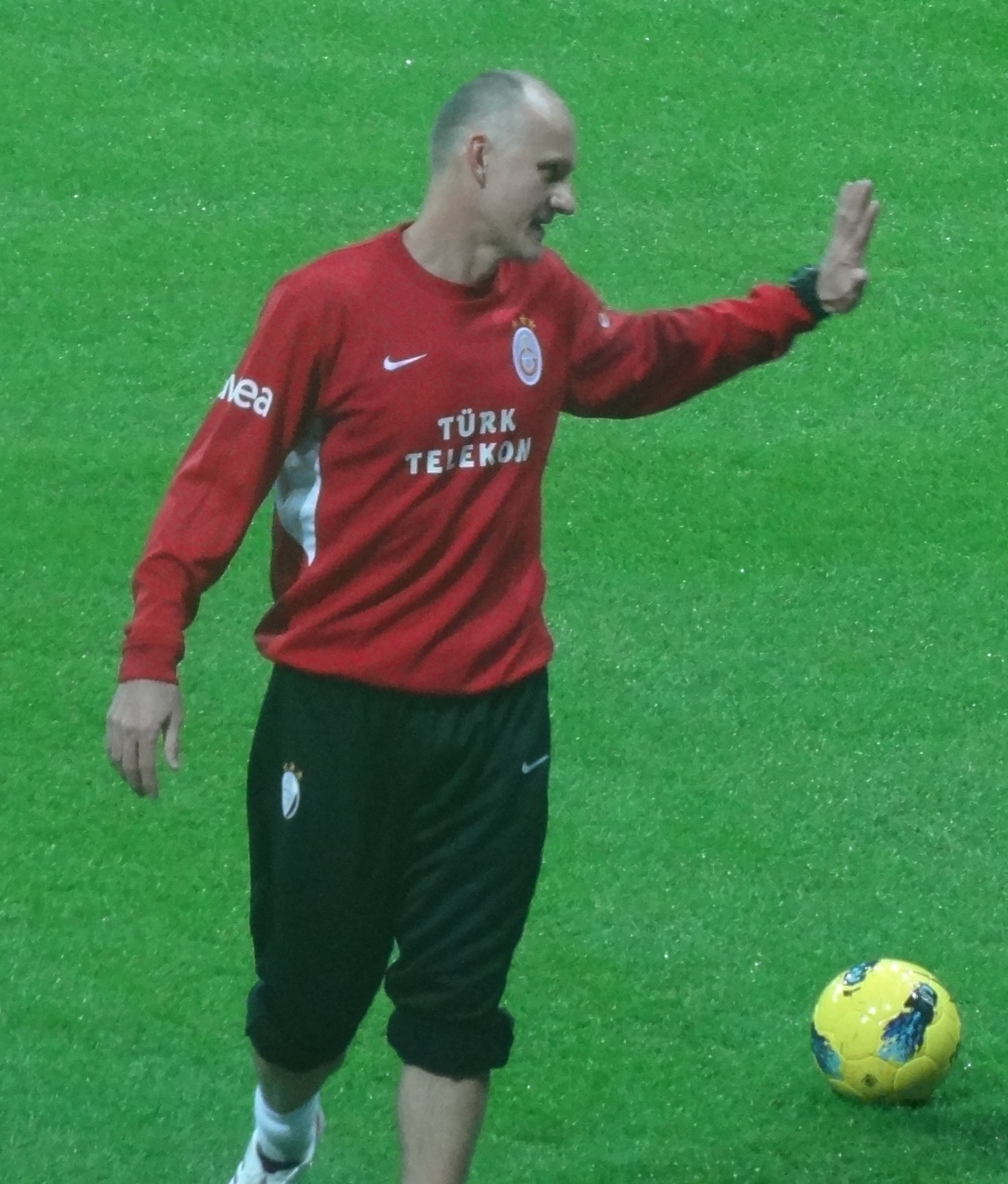
Cláudio Taffarel made 144 appearances for Galatasaray

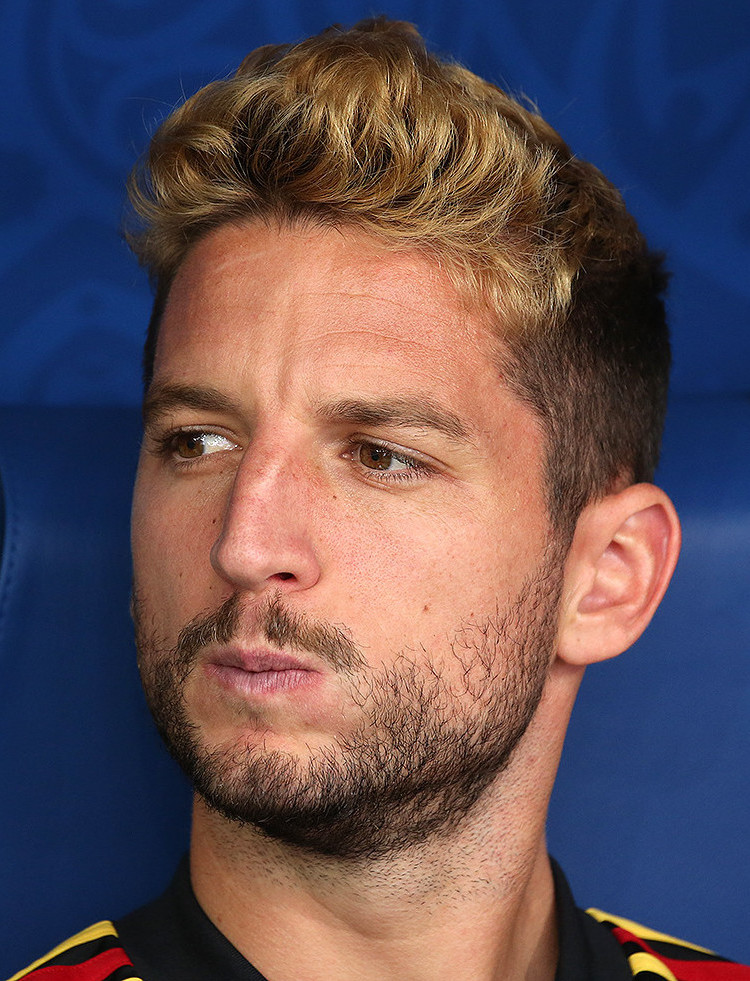
Dries Mertens made 136 appearances for Galatasaray

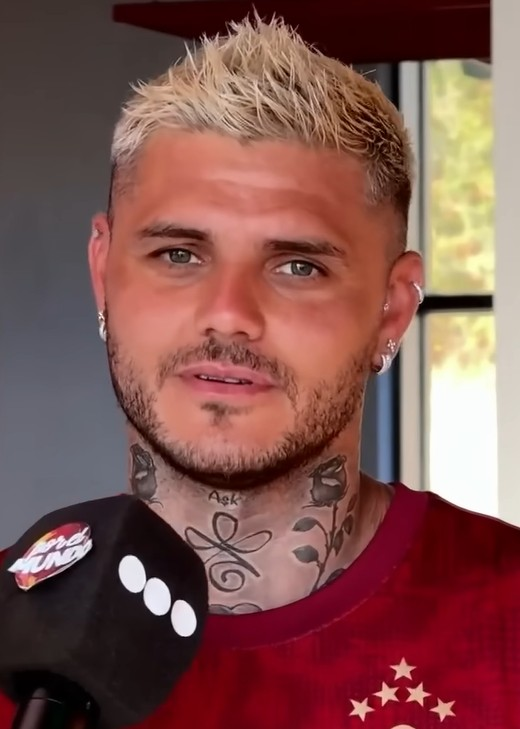
Mauro Icardi made 134 appearances for Galatasaray

Players highlighted in bold are still actively playing at Galatasaray.

List of Galatasaray S.K. players with at least 100 appearances
Name	Nationality	Position	Galatasaray career	Starts	Subs	Total	Goals	Ref(s)
Name	Nationality	Position	Galatasaray career	Appearances			Goals	Ref(s)
Bülent Korkmaz	Turkey	DF	1987–2005	559	54	613	18	
Fernando Muslera	Uruguay	GK	2011–2025	549	0	549	2	
Hakan Şükür	Turkey	FW	1992–1995, 1995–2000, 2003–2008	516	33	549	292	
Cüneyt Tanman	Turkey	DF	1973–1991	512	23	535	53	
Arif Erdem	Turkey	FW	1991–2000, 2001–2005	327	171	498	138	
Sabri Sarıoğlu	Turkey	MF	2002–2017	362	113	475	24	
Ergün Penbe	Turkey	MF	1994–2007	353	85	438	14	
Fatih Terim	Turkey	DF	1974–1985	431	3	434	29	
Tugay Kerimoğlu	Turkey	MF	1987–2000	376	42	418	40	
Turgay Şeren	Turkey	GK	1949–1967	417	0	417	0	
Metin Oktay	Turkey	FW	1955–1961, 1962–1969	416	1	417	356	
Gökmen Özdenak	Turkey	FW	1967–1980	365	42	407	141	
Uğur Köken	Turkey	FW	1959–1973	374	7	381	48	
Mehmet Oğuz	Turkey	MF	1967–1979	356	22	378	40	
Suat Kaya	Turkey	MF	1986–1987, 1992–2003	281	86	367	43	
Hasan Şaş	Turkey	MF	1998–2009	266	86	352	40	
İsmail Demiriz	Turkey	DF	1984–1993	314	23	337	9	
Hakan Balta	Turkey	DF	2007–2018	304	28	332	13	
Selçuk İnan	Turkey	MF	2011–2020	292	39	331	59	
Hakan Ünsal	Turkey	DF	1994–2002, 2003–2005	298	30	328	25	
Ayhan Akman	Turkey	MF	2001–2012	241	78	319	16	
Okan Buruk	Turkey	MF	1991–2001, 2006–2008	234	81	315	44	
Yusuf Altıntaş	Turkey	DF	1984–1994	277	20	297	25	
Uğur Tütüneker	Turkey	FW	1986–1996	259	33	292	57	
Ayhan Elmastaşoğlu	Turkey	FW	1960–1972	285	6	291	82	
Suat Mamat	Turkey	MF	1952–1963	286	1	287	99	
Mustafa Yürür	Turkey	MF	1959–1968	280	3	283	13	
Ergun Ercins	Turkey	MF	1954–1965	267	1	268	2	
Zoran Simović	Yugoslavia	GK	1984–1990	250	1	251	1	
Xhevat Prekazi	Yugoslavia	MF	1985–1992	210	37	247	49	
Talat Özkarslı	Turkey	MF	1961–1971	247	0	247	15	
Yasin Özdenak	Turkey	GK	1967–1976	245	2	247	0	
Raşit Çetiner	Turkey	DF	1981–1988	245	1	246	40	
Kadri Aytaç	Turkey	FW	1953–1958, 1962–1966	242	2	244	79	
Muzaffer Sipahi	Turkey	DF	1968–1975	243	0	243	1	
Ahmet Berman	Turkey	FW	1959–1965	240	1	241	13	
Candemir Berkman	Turkey	DF	1957–1965	240	0	240	2	
Faryd Mondragón	Colombia	GK	2001–2007	239	0	239	0	
Ümit Karan	Turkey	FW	2001–2009	175	63	238	97	
Erhan Önal	Turkey	DF	1985–1992	226	12	238	15	
Bülent Alkılıç	Turkey	FW	1980–1986, 1989–1991	184	53	237	27	
Mustafa Ergücü	Turkey	MF	1973–1976, 1978–1985	185	52	237	28	
Arda Turan	Turkey	MF	2004–2011, 2020–2022	194	41	235	48	
Ekrem Günalp	Turkey	DF	1969–1977	219	16	235	6	
Ümit Davala	Turkey	DF	1996–2001, 2002–2003	203	32	234	33	
Salim Şatıroğlu	Turkey	DF	1935–1949	228	1	229	40	
Semih Yuvakuran	Turkey	DF	1984–1990	202	21	223	5	
Turan Doğangün	Turkey	MF	1962–1970	219	3	222	36	
**Barış Alper Yılmaz**	Turkey	MF	2021–	149	71	220	39	
Öner Kılıç	Turkey	FW	1976–1987	191	25	216	26	
Metin Kurt	Turkey	FW	1970–1976	212	4	216	48	
Hayrettin Demirbaş	Turkey	GK	1986–1997	212	3	215	0	
Semih Kaya	Turkey	DF	2008–2017, 2019, 2022	199	12	211	5	
Muhammet Altıntaş	Turkey	MF	1986–1993	173	36	209	11	
Muzaffer Tokaç	Turkey	FW	1942–1955	200	0	200	50	
Gündüz Kılıç	Turkey	FW	1935–1952	200	0	200	150	
Tuncay Temeller	Turkey	DF	1970–1979	186	13	199	23	
Mehmet Özgül	Turkey	FW	1972–1978, 1981	182	16	198	59	
İsfendiyar Açıksöz	Turkey	FW	1946–1960	196	0	197	42	
Gheorghe Hagi	Romania	MF	1996–2001	190	6	196	73	
Erdal Keser	Turkey	FW	1984–1986, 1989–1994	170	26	196	59	
Metin Yıldız	Turkey	MF	1978–1985, 1989–1992	165	28	193	12	
**Lucas Torreira**	Uruguay	MF	2022–	180	10	190	12	
Ergün Acuner	Turkey	DF	1964–1971	188	1	189	32	
Aydın Güleş	Turkey	MF	1970–1976	170	16	186	7	
Faruk Barlas	Turkey	DF	1933–1935, 1938–1947	186	0	186	0	
Ahmet Karlıklı	Turkey	DF	1957–1965	183	1	184	12	
**Abdülkerim Bardakcı**	Turkey	DF	2022–	174	9	183	18	
Bülent Ünder	Turkey	MF	1969–1978	149	33	182	10	
Gheorghe Popescu	Romania	DF	1997–2001	180	1	181	8	
Emre Çolak	Turkey	MF	2009–2016	104	77	181	19	
Kerem Aktürkoğlu	Turkey	FW	2020–2024	134	45	179	46	
Eser Özaltındere	Turkey	GK	1978–1984	175	2	177	0	
Wesley Sneijder	Netherlands	MF	2013–2017	162	13	175	46	
Osman İncili	Turkey	GK	1938–1949	175	0	175	0	
Umut Bulut	Turkey	FW	2012–2016	89	84	173	43	
Güngör Tekin	Turkey	DF	1975–1980	172	1	173	11	
Fatih Akyel	Turkey	DF	1997–2001	146	24	170	10	
Müfit Erkasap	Turkey	DF	1974–1983	156	14	169	6	
Servet Çetin	Turkey	DF	2007–2012	160	8	168	12	
Yılmaz Gökdel	Turkey	FW	1963–1970	163	5	168	20	
Bülent Eken	Turkey	DF	1942–1950, 1952–1955	165	0	165	61	
Musa Sezer	Turkey	MF	1937–1951	165	0	165	3	
Nihat Akbay	Turkey	GK	1968–1978	160	4	164	0	
**Yunus Akgün**	Turkey	MF	2018–	104	59	163	32	
Cihan Haspolatlı	Turkey	DF	2002–2007	134	29	163	13	
Sofiane Feghouli	Algeria	MF	2017–2022	127	35	162	34	
Bahri Altıntabak	Turkey	MF	1960–1967	157	3	160	46	
Berkan Kutlu	Turkey	MF	2021–2026	88	71	159	3	
Emre Belözoğlu	Turkey	MF	1996–2001	119	40	159	21	
Ahmet Ceyhan	Turkey	DF	1982–1987	148	10	158	1	
Tanju Çolak	Turkey	FW	1987–1991	152	5	157	145	
Hamza Hamzaoğlu	Turkey	MF	1991–1995	148	7	155	11	
Felipe Melo	Brazil	MF	2011–2015	148	7	155	18	
Ryan Donk	Suriname	MF	2016–2021	120	35	155	8	
Tarık Kutver	Turkey	FW	1962–1967	152	0	152	49	
Yasin Öztekin	Turkey	MF	2014–2018	107	41	148	31	
Emre Aşık	Turkey	DF	2000–2003, 2006–2010	123	24	147	4	
Saim Tayşengil	Turkey	DF	1955–1960	146	1	147	8	
Doğan Sel	Turkey	DF	1963–1968	145	1	146	1	
Martin Linnes	Norway	DF	2016–2021	109	37	146	5	
Victor Nelsson	Denmark	DF	2021–2026	124	20	144	4	
Cláudio Taffarel	Brazil	GK	1998–2001	144	0	144	0	
Erdoğan Arıca	Turkey	DF	1977–1981	143	1	144	2	
Marcão	Brazil	DF	2019–2022	141	0	141	2	
Burak Yılmaz	Turkey	FW	2012–2016	128	13	141	82	
Eşfak Aykaç	Turkey	FW	1935–1945	141	0	141	59	
Necati Ateş	Turkey	FW	2004–2007, 2012	118	22	140	65	
Adnan Esen	Turkey	MF	1982–1987	108	32	140	4	
Ali Çoban	Turkey	DF	1980–1984	136	4	140	6	
Aydın Yılmaz	Turkey	MF	2005–2015	44	94	138	11	
**Davinson Sánchez**	Colombia	DF	2023–	126	10	136	11	
Dries Mertens	Belgium	FW	2022–2025	107	29	136	25	
Rigobert Song	Cameroon	DF	2004–2008	129	6	135	6	
Mauro Icardi	Argentina	FW	2022–2026	97	37	134	77	
Mert Korkmaz	Turkey	DF	1991–1997	104	30	134	1	
Barış Özbek	Turkey	MF	2007–2011	101	33	134	12	
Şevki Şenlen	Turkey	FW	1973–1977	122	12	134	32	
Arif Kocabıyık	Turkey	MF	1985–1989	109	24	133	2	
Arif Sevinç	Turkey	MF	1940–1948	132	0	132	33	
Reha Eken	Turkey	FW	1944–1954	131	0	131	82	
Adnan İncirmen	Turkey	DF	1937–1949	130	1	131	0	
Necdet Cici	Turkey	FW	1928–1941	131	0	131	63	
Younès Belhanda	Morocco	MF	2017–2021	117	14	131	22	
**Kaan Ayhan**	Turkey	DF	2023–	70	59	129	4	
Vedat İnceefe	Turkey	DF	1995–2003	96	33	129	4	
Ömer Bayram	Turkey	MF	2018–2022	70	56	126	2	
Ahmet Akkuş	Turkey	MF	1970–1974	96	29	125	24	
Mehmet Topal	Turkey	MF	2006–2010	102	22	124	4	
Coşkun Özarı	Turkey	MF	1953–1960	124	0	124	19	
Stjepan Tomas	Croatia	DF	2004–2007	119	1	120	1	
Aurélien Chedjou	Cameroon	DF	2013–2017	113	6	119	12	
Ali Beratlıgil	Turkey	FW	1951–1958	118	0	118	33	
İlyas Tüfekçi	Turkey	FW	1986–1990	84	32	116	25	
Enver Arslanalp	Turkey	MF	1939–1945	116	0	116	4	
Sinan Gümüş	Turkey	FW	2014–2019	54	62	116	33	
Milan Baroš	Czech Republic	FW	2008–2013	87	28	115	61	
Mersad Kovačević	Yugoslavia	FW	1986–1989	87	27	114	38	
Capone	Brazil	DF	1999–2002	103	10	113	9	
Gürcan Aday	Turkey	MF	1977–1981	86	23	109	4	
Mustafa Gençsoy	Turkey	MF	1940–1946	109	0	109	30	
Mariano	Brazil	DF	2017–2020	97	8	105	2	
**Gabriel Sara**	Brazil	MF	2024–	84	19	103	10	
Orhan Ak	Turkey	DF	2003–2007	95	8	103	5	
Bülent Gürbüz	Turkey	GK	1960–1967	100	2	102	0	
Taylan Antalyalı	Turkey	MF	2019–2025	82	20	102	2	
Emmanuel Eboué	Ivory Coast	DF	2011–2015	95	6	101	5	
Sacha Boey	France	DF	2021–2024, 2026	90	10	100	6	
Ryan Babel	Netherlands	MF	2019–2022	61	48	100	17	
