= Kamil Altan =

Turkish footballer

Personal information
- Date of birth: 7 April 1924
- Place of birth: Istanbul, Turkey
- Date of death: 25 February 2011 (aged 86)
- Place of death: Istanbul, Turkey
- Height: 1.71 m (5 ft 7 in)
- Position: Defender

Senior career*
Years	Team	Apps	(Gls)
–1952	Eyüpspor		
1952–1958	Galatasaray	15	(10)
1958–1960	Taksim		

International career
1952	Turkey	1	(0)
- * Club domestic league appearances and goals

Kamil Altan (7 April 1924 – 25 February 2011) was a Turkish footballer. He competed in the men's tournament at the 1952 Summer Olympics.

== Career ==
Prior to the 1952–53 season, Altan moved from Eyüpspor to Galatasaray, where he played until the end of the 1959–60 season. He scored one goal in 59 league appearances for the club. In the 1954–55 and 1955–56 seasons, he was part of the teams winning the Istanbul Football League. He then signed with Taksim, playing there until 1960.

After ending his football career, he became coach of Galatasaray's youth team in 1961. After staying in this position for a while, he was the manager of Tophane Tayfunspor, an amateur team, in the 1970s.

== Personal life ==
Altan died on 25 February 2011. He was buried in Selimpaşa Cemetery after noon prayers at the Teşvikiye Mosque on 27 February.

== Honours ==
Galatasaray

- Istanbul Football League: 1954–55, 1955–56
