= 1957–58 Istanbul Football League =

Istanbul Football League
- Season: 1957–58
- Champions: Galatasaray SK (15th title)
- Matches: 90
- Goals: 262 (2.91 per match)
- Top goalscorer: Metin Oktay (19 goals)
- Biggest home win: Galatasaray SK 8-1 Kasımpaşa S.K. (28 December 1957)
- Biggest away win: Beyoğlu S.K. 0-5 Galatasaray SK (18 February 1958)
- Highest scoring: Galatasaray SK 8-1 Kasımpaşa S.K. (28 December 1957) (9 goals)
- Longest unbeaten run: 5 games Galatasaray SK

The 1957–58 Istanbul Football League was the 33rd season of the league. Galatasaray SK became champions for the 15th time in their history.

== League table ==
Pos	Team	Pld	W	D	L	GF	GA	GD	Pts
1	Galatasaray SK	18	14	3	1	48	10	+38	31
2	Fenerbahçe SK	18	12	3	3	39	13	+26	27
3	İstanbulspor	18	9	5	4	22	14	+8	23
4	Beşiktaş J.K.	18	9	4	5	34	18	+16	22
5	Vefa S.K.	18	7	3	8	23	28	−5	17
6	Kasımpaşa S.K.	18	5	4	9	19	28	−9	14
7	Alibeyköy S.K.	18	6	1	11	28	35	−7	13
8	Beyoğlu S.K.	18	4	5	9	14	37	−23	13
9	Beykoz 1908 S.K.D.	18	5	2	11	20	26	−6	13 (Note: 1 bonus point?)
10	Emniyet S.K.	18	2	4	12	15	53	−38	8

== Topscorer ==
Pos.	Player	Team	Goals
1	(Turkey) Metin Oktay	Galatasaray SK	19
2	(Turkey) Kadri Aytaç	Galatasaray SK	14
3	(Turkey) Lefter Küçükandonyadis	Fenerbahçe SK	11
4	(Turkey) Recep Adanır	Beşiktaş J.K.	9
5	(Turkey) Nusret Dalkıran	Beykoz 1908 S.K.D.	8
5	(Turkey) Nazmi Bilge	Beşiktaş J.K.	8
6	(Turkey) Suat Mamat	Galatasaray SK	7
7	(Turkey) Aleko Sofianidis	Beyoğlu S.K.	6
7	(Turkey) Turhan Bayraktutan	Fenerbahçe SK	6
7	(Turkey) Hüsamettin Poyrazoğlu	Alibeyköy S.K.	6
