= 1958–59 Istanbul Football League =

Istanbul Football League
- Season: 1958–59
- Champions: Fenerbahçe SK (16th title)
- Matches played: 90
- Goals scored: 260 (2.89 per match)
- Top goalscorer: Metin Oktay (22 goals)
- Longest unbeaten run: 18 games Fenerbahçe SK

The 1958–59 Istanbul Football League was the 34th season of the league and also the last. This season was used to select which teams would compete in the first season of the newly founded Turkish National League. Eight teams would be picked. Fenerbahçe SK became champions for the 16th time in their history.

== Season ==
Pos	Team	Pld	W	D	L	GF	GA	GD	Pts	Qualification
1	Fenerbahçe SK (C)	18	14	4	0	47	7	+40	32	Qualified for the Turkish National League
2	Galatasaray SK	18	13	4	1	50	9	+41	30	Qualified for the Turkish National League
3	Fatih Karagümrük S.K.	18	9	3	6	27	25	+2	21	Qualified for the Turkish National League
4	İstanbulspor	18	6	7	5	19	19	0	19	Qualified for the Turkish National League
5	Beşiktaş J.K.	18	8	2	8	28	26	+2	18	Qualified for the Turkish National League
6	Beykoz 1908 S.K.D.	18	6	6	6	23	29	−6	18	Qualified for the Turkish National League
7	Adalet SK	18	5	5	8	16	31	−15	15	Qualified for the Turkish National League
8	Vefa S.K.	18	3	8	7	23	29	−6	14	Qualified for the Turkish National League
9	Kasımpaşa S.K.	18	3	2	13	15	45	−30	8	
10	Beyoğlu S.K.	18	2	1	15	13	41	−28	5	

(C) Champions
