= 1954–55 Istanbul Football League =

Istanbul Football League
- Season: 1954–55
- Champions: Galatasaray SK (13th title)

The 1954–55 İstanbul Football League season was the 45th season of the league. Galatasaray SK won the league for the 13th time.

== Season ==
Pos	Team	Pld	W	D	L	GF	GA	GD	Pts
1	Galatasaray SK	18	14	2	2	40	13	+27	30
2	Beşiktaş JK	18	13	4	1	46	19	+27	30
3	Fenerbahçe SK	18	11	4	3	50	13	+37	26
4	Adalet SK	18	8	5	5	37	31	+6	21
5	Vefa SK	18	6	5	7	27	28	−1	17
6	İstanbulspor	18	5	5	8	15	25	−10	15
7	Emniyet SK	18	2	9	7	13	31	−18	13
8	Beykoz 1908 S.K.D.	18	3	6	9	17	34	−17	12
9	Beyoğlu SK	18	1	7	10	17	47	−30	9
10	Kasımpaşa SK	18	2	3	13	14	35	−21	7
