= Istanbul Friday League =

The Istanbul Friday League was founded in 1912, and replaced the Istanbul Sunday League in 1915. Seven clubs took part in the league when it was first founded in 1912: Anadoluspor, Darülfünun, Terbiye-i Bedeniye, Türk İdman Ocağı, Mümaresatı Bedeniye, Şehremini, and Fenerbahçe S.K.

== Champions ==
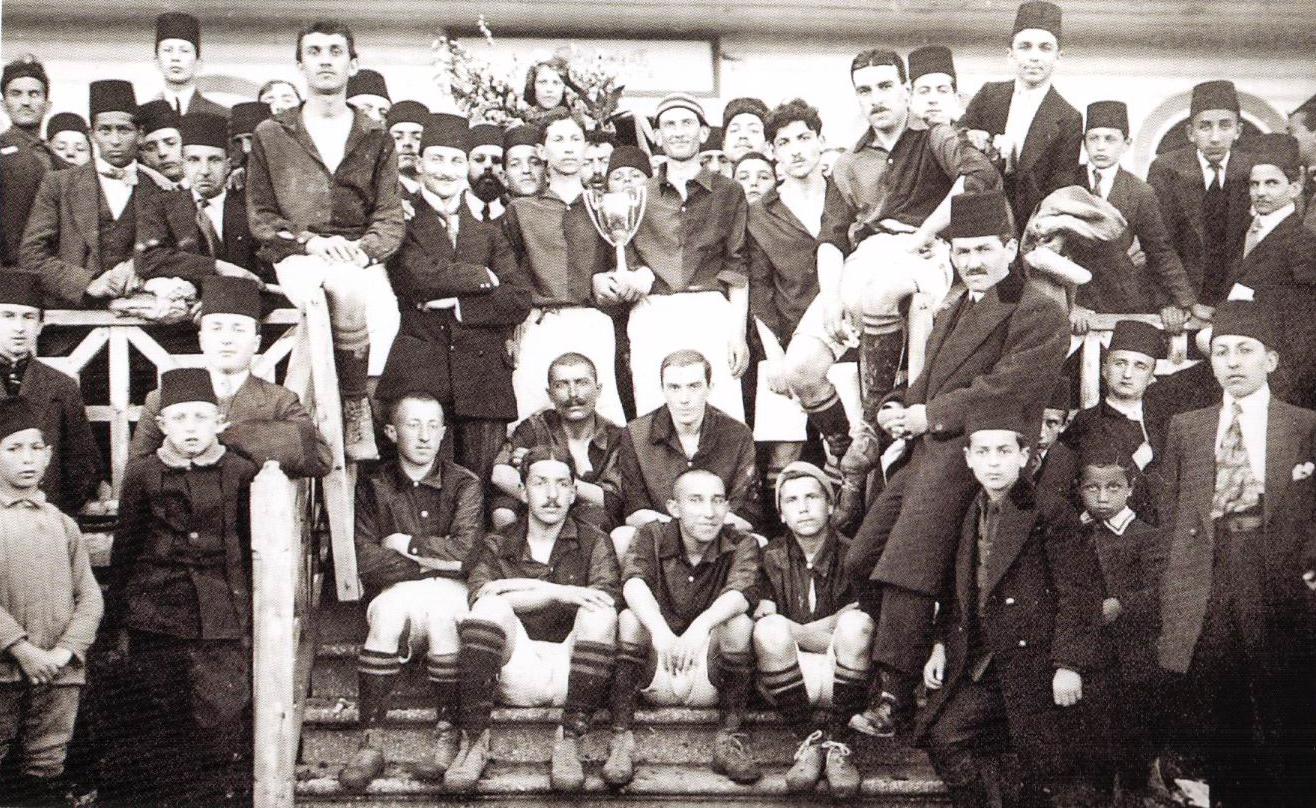
Galatasaray SK 1915-16 Champion

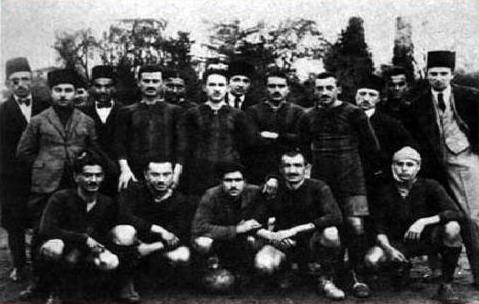
Istanbul Friday League - Altınordu İdman Yurdu 1916-17 and 1917-18 Champion

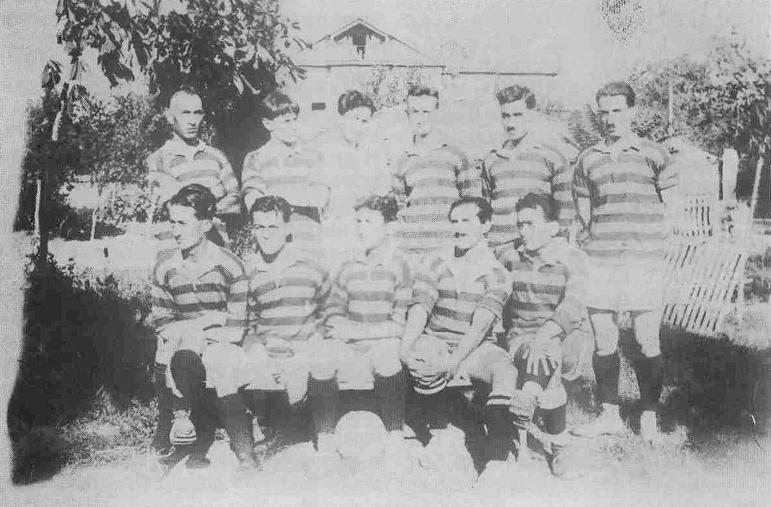
Fenerbahce SK 1921-22 Champion

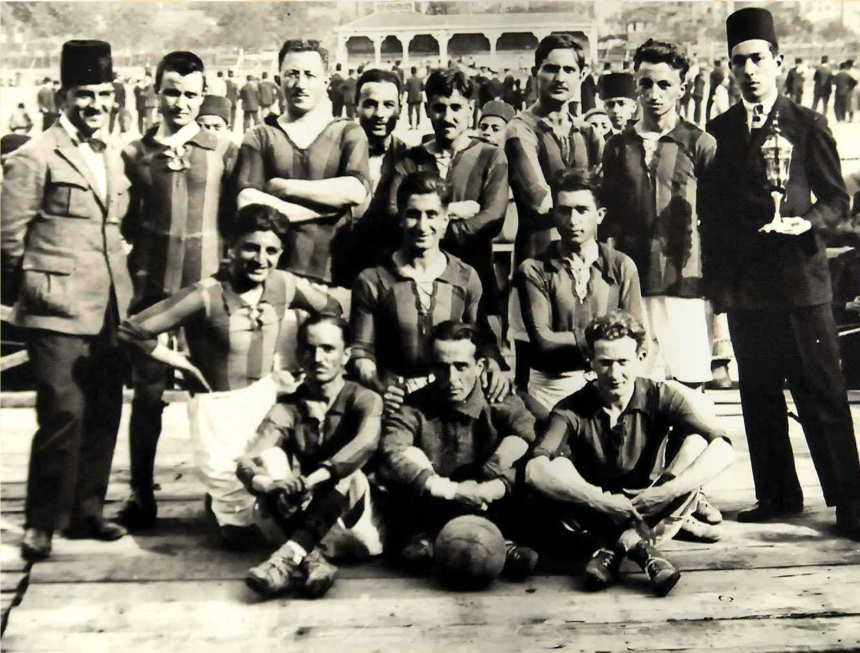
Galatasaray SK 1921-22 Champion

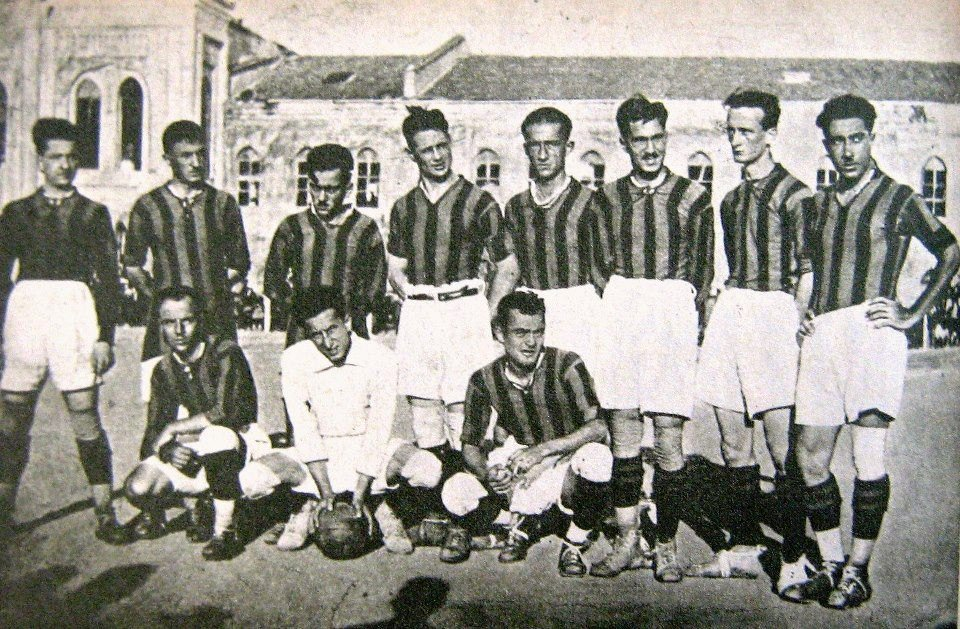
Fenerbahce SK 1922-23 Champion

Year	Winner
1915–1916	Galatasaray
1916–1917	Altınordu İdman Yurdu
1917–1918	Altınordu İdman Yurdu
1918–1919	Unaccomplished due to Mudros Armistice
1919–1920	Aborted
1920–1921	Fenerbahçe
1921–1922	Galatasaray
1922–1923	Fenerbahçe

== Past winners ==
Club	Times won
Galatasaray S.K.	2
Fenerbahçe S.K.	2
Altınordu İdman Yurdu SK	2
