= 1952–53 Istanbul Football League =

Istanbul Football League
- Season: 1952–53
- Champions: Fenerbahçe SK (13th title)

The 1952–53 İstanbul Football League season was the 43rd season of the league. Fenerbahçe SK won the league for the 13th time.

== Season ==
Pos	Team	Pld	W	D	L	GF	GA	GD	Pts
1	Fenerbahçe SK	18	14	4	0	44	9	+35	32
2	Beşiktaş JK	18	13	3	2	53	18	+35	29
3	Galatasaray SK	18	9	5	4	30	18	+12	23
4	Vefa SK	18	8	6	4	35	18	+17	22
5	Adalet SK	18	7	5	6	23	18	+5	19
6	İstanbulspor	18	7	4	7	30	28	+2	18
7	Beykoz 1908 S.K.D.	18	5	5	8	22	22	0	15
8	Kasımpaşa SK	18	5	3	10	22	33	−11	13
9	Beyoğlu SK	18	3	3	12	19	47	−28	9
10	Emniyet SK	18	0	0	18	5	72	−67	0
