= 1956–57 Istanbul Football League =

Istanbul Football League
- Season: 1956–57
- Champions: Fenerbahçe SK (14th title)

The 1956–57 İstanbul Football League season was the 47th season of the league. Fenerbahçe SK won the league for the 14th time.

== Season ==
Pos	Team	Pld	W	D	L	GF	GA	GD	Pts
1	Fenerbahçe SK	18	14	1	3	51	14	+37	29
2	Galatasaray SK	18	13	3	2	44	19	+25	29
3	İstanbulspor	18	9	6	3	32	21	+11	24
4	Beykoz 1908 S.K.D.	18	8	3	7	30	25	+5	19
5	Beşiktaş JK	18	8	3	7	33	30	+3	19
6	Adalet SK	18	6	6	6	29	26	+3	18
7	Vefa SK	18	5	4	9	20	26	−6	14
8	Kasımpaşa SK	18	3	4	11	13	35	−22	10
9	Beyoğlu SK	18	4	2	12	15	41	−26	10
10	Emniyet SK	18	1	6	11	15	45	−30	8
