= 1955–56 Istanbul Football League =

Istanbul Football League
- Season: 1955–56
- Champions: Galatasaray SK (14th title)
- European Cup: Galatasaray SK

The 1955–56 İstanbul Football League season was the 46th season of the league. Galatasaray SK won the league for the 14th time, and qualified for the 1956–57 European Cup.

== Season ==
Pos	Team	Pld	W	D	L	GF	GA	GD	Pts
1	Galatasaray SK	18	12	5	1	52	19	+33	29
2	Beşiktaş JK	18	10	6	2	45	22	+23	26
3	Fenerbahçe SK	18	10	6	2	30	14	+16	26
4	İstanbulspor	18	6	8	4	32	25	+7	20
5	Adalet SK	18	6	6	6	31	26	+5	18
6	Beykoz 1908 S.K.D.	18	6	6	6	24	21	+3	18
7	Vefa SK	18	4	5	9	20	28	−8	13
8	Kasımpaşa SK	18	5	3	10	20	38	−18	13
9	Beyoğlu SK	18	3	4	11	18	40	−22	10
10	Emniyet SK	18	2	3	13	12	51	−39	7
