= Taksim S.K. =

- Full name: Taksim Spor Kulübü
- Founded: 1940
- Ground: Feriköy Stadium, Şişli, Istanbul
- Chairman: (Turkey) Necdet Yılmaz
- Manager: (Turkey) Necdet Yılmaz
- League: Istanbul Super Amateur League
Home colours	Away colours

Taksim Spor Kulübü is a sports club located in Beyoğlu, Istanbul, Turkey. The football team of the club plays in the Istanbul Super Amateur League. The club was founded in 1940 by mostly members of the Armenian community of Istanbul when Ateş-Güneş, Nor Şişli and Kalespor clubs merged. The club has had players of Armenian, Jewish and Greek descent as well as other Turkish players in its history.

== Attendances ==
- Istanbul Amateur League: 1940–67
- Turkey Second League: 1967–68
- Turkey Third League: 1968–74
- Istanbul (Super) Amateur League: 2016–2018
- Istanbul First Amateur League: 2018–2022
- Istanbul Second Amateur League: 2022-present

== See also ==
- Garo Hamamcıoğlu
- Lefter Küçükandonyadis
- Garbis İstanbulluoğlu
