= 1949–50 Istanbul Football League =

Istanbul Football League
- Season: 1949–50
- Champions: Beşiktaş JK (10th title)

The 1949–50 İstanbul Football League season was the 40th season of the league. Beşiktaş JK won the league for the 10th time.

== Season ==
Pos	Team	Pld	W	D	L	GF	GA	GD	Pts
1	Beşiktaş JK	14	11	2	1	43	8	+35	38
2	Fenerbahçe SK	14	9	3	2	34	10	+24	35
3	Galatasaray SK	14	8	2	4	21	11	+10	32
4	Vefa SK	14	6	2	6	15	16	−1	28
5	Kasımpaşa SK	14	3	3	8	12	22	−10	23
6	İstanbulspor	14	3	3	8	11	25	−14	23
7	Beykoz 1908 S.K.D.	14	4	1	9	12	40	−28	23
8	Emniyet SK	14	3	2	9	9	25	−16	22
