= 1953–54 Istanbul Football League =

Turkish football league season

Istanbul Football League
- Season: 1953–54
- Champions: Beşiktaş JK (13th title)

The 1953–54 İstanbul Football League season was the 44th season of the league. Beşiktaş JK won the league for the 13th time.

== Season ==
Pos	Team	Pld	W	D	L	GF	GA	GD	Pts
1	Beşiktaş JK	18	15	2	1	41	13	+28	32
2	Galatasaray SK	18	12	3	3	49	20	+29	27
3	Fenerbahçe SK	18	9	3	6	37	24	+13	21
4	Vefa SK	18	9	3	6	36	30	+6	21
5	İstanbulspor	18	8	5	5	32	27	+5	21
6	Kasımpaşa SK	18	9	3	6	34	32	+2	21
7	Beykoz 1908 S.K.D.	18	6	3	9	22	32	−10	15
8	Adalet SK	18	5	4	9	33	35	−2	14
9	Beyoğlu SK	18	3	1	14	21	46	−25	7
10	Emniyet SK	18	0	1	17	7	53	−46	1
