= Istanbul Football League =

- Founded: 1904
- Folded: 1959
- Country: Turkey
- Number of clubs: various
- Level on pyramid: 1
- Domestic cup(s): Istanbul Shield (1929–39); Istanbul Football Cup (1942–47)
- Last champions: Fenerbahçe (16th title) (1958–59)
- Most championships: Fenerbahçe (16 titles)

The Istanbul Football League (Turkish: İstanbul Futbol Ligi) was founded as a regional football league under the name Constantinople Football Association League by James La Fontaine and Henry Pears in Istanbul, the capital of the former Ottoman Empire, in 1904. The League was the first football organization ever in the Ottoman Empire and later Turkey. In the inaugural 1904–05 season the matches between the four teams, Moda FC, HMS Imogene, Elpis FC, and Cadi-Keuy FC were played on Sundays, leading to the name of the league, Istanbul Sunday League. Henry Pears, an Englishman and one of the three founders, promised to ultimately award the shield to the club with the most championships won during the initial 10 years.

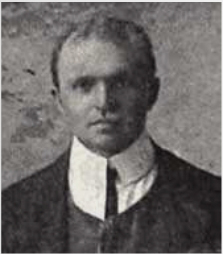
One of the founders of the league, James Lafontaine

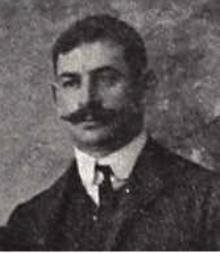
Founder Henry Pears

The Istanbul Friday League was founded in 1915 and replaced the Istanbul Sunday League. Seven teams participated in its inaugural 1915–16 season. From 1923–24 to 1950–51 the league was called Istanbul League. The name was later changed and became Istanbul Professional League in the 1952 season, as professionalism was introduced by the Turkish Football Federation in 1951.

Fenerbahçe are the most successful club, having won the league a record 16 times in total.

== History and dates ==
The first league was officially known as the Constantinople Football Association League or Sunday league and the games were played every Sunday. The first editions were played between English and Greek clubs and in 1906 Galatasaray became the first Turkish team to enter the league. In the 1914–15 season, there were two separate leagues: the existing Constantinople Football Association League and the Constantinople Championship League, due to the large number of teams. For the first time, no English or Greek club competed and the league consisted only of Turkish clubs, following the eruption of WW I.

The Constantinople Championship League was actually a Friday league who was founded in 1912 as the games were played every Friday. The teams playing in this league were Darülfünun SK, İstanbul Jimnastik K (later on known as (Türk İdman Ocağı), Anadolu SK, Sanayii FK, Şehremini SK, and Fenerbahçe SK (II). The Constantinople league was still the main league and they refused the promotion requests from the Friday league until 1915 when the two leagues (Sunday and Friday) merged under the name of the Friday League (Cum Ligi) and were played until 1923.

A third league in İstanbul had started in 1919-1920 by Beşiktaş JK, who were denied the to join the Friday league. This league was called "İstanbul Türk İdman Birliği" and it was played every Sunday.

In the early seasons all matches were played at two venues: in Kadıköy (called as Union Club Field or Papazın Çayırı) and Moda (Yoğurt Çesme).

The Türkiye İdman Cemiyetleri İttifakı (The Turkish Gymnastics Clubs Union) was established in April 1922 and organized sports clubs in other cities as well. TICI has setup a temporary committee to set up the Turkish Football Federation under the name of "Futbol Encümeni". The committee completed its work and the Football Federation was established in the meeting of 23 April 1923 under the name of "Futbol Hey'et-i Müttehidesi". Then the league games became more official and the federation started soccer leagues in several cities like İstanbul, Ankara, İzmir, Adana, Eskişehir and Trabzon. The Constantinople football leagues by dates:

Ottoman Empire era

- Constantinople Football Association League: 1904-1915 (Sunday League)
- Constantinople Championship League: 1914-1915 (Friday League)
- Cuma Ligi (unified): 1915-1923 (Friday League)
- Turkish League (İstanbul Türk İdman Birliği Ligi): 1919-1921 (only Turkish teams)
- Bazaar League (Pazar Ligi): 1920-1922 (Sunday League)

Turkey Republic era

- Istanbul League: 1923-1951
- Istanbul Professional League: 1952-1959 (Istanbul Professional League Div.2: 1956-1959)

Various notes
-The 1912-13 seasons were not held due to the Balkan Wars
-The 1918-19 and 1919-20 seasons were not held due to World War I
-The Friday League was organized with the participation of teams that were not included in the Friday League because they were not considered strong enough
-After the merge, The Sunday League was organized among the teams that could not participate in the primary Friday League
-1927-28 season was not played due to preparations for the 1928 Summer Olympics.

== Champions ==
Season	Winners (number of titles)	Runners-up
1904–05	HMS Imogene FC (1)	Moda FC
1905–06	Cadi-Keuy FC (1)	HMS Imogene FC
1906–07	Cadi-Keuy FC (2)	Moda FC
1907–08	Moda FC (1)	Cadi-Keuy FC
1908–09	Galatasaray SK (1)	Moda FC
1909–10	Galatasaray SK (2)	Strugglers FC
1910–11	Galatasaray SK (3)	Progress FC
1911–12	Fenerbahçe SK (1)	Rumblers FC
1912–13	Unaccomplished due to the Balkan Wars	
1913–14	Fenerbahçe SK (2)	Altınordu İdman Yurdu
1914–15	Galatasaray SK (4)	Üsküdar Anadolu SK
1914–15	Fenerbahçe SK (3)	Türk İdman Ocağı
1915–16	Galatasaray SK (5)	Fenerbahçe SK
1916–17	Altınordu İdman Yurdu (1)	Üsküdar Anadolu SK
1917–18	Altınordu İdman Yurdu (2)	Fenerbahçe SK
1918–19	Unaccomplished due to Armistice of Mudros	
1919–20	Cancelled	
1920–21	Fenerbahçe SK (4)	Galatasaray SK
1921–22	Galatasaray SK (6)	Fenerbahçe SK
1922–23	Fenerbahçe SK (5)	Altınordu İdman Yurdu
1923–24	Beşiktaş JK (1)	Galatasaray SK
1924–25	Galatasaray SK(7)	Vefa SK
1925–26	Galatasaray SK(8)	Fenerbahçe SK
1926–27	Galatasaray SK(9)	Fenerbahçe SK
1927–28	Cancelled due to the 1928 Summer Olympics in Amsterdam	
1928–29	Galatasaray SK (10)	Fenerbahçe SK
1929–30	Fenerbahçe SK (6)	Galatasaray SK
1930–31	Galatasaray SK (11)	Fenerbahçe SK
1931–32	İstanbulspor (1)	Süleymaniye FC
1932–33	Fenerbahçe SK (7)	Beşiktaş JK
1933–34	Beşiktaş JK (2)	Fenerbahçe SK
1934–35	Fenerbahçe SK (8)	Galatasaray SK
1935–36	Fenerbahçe SK (9)	Galatasaray SK
1936–37	Fenerbahçe SK (10)	Güneş SK
1937–38	Güneş SK (1)	Fenerbahçe SK
1938–39	Beşiktaş JK (3)	Fenerbahçe SK
1939–40	Beşiktaş JK (4)	Fenerbahçe SK
1940–41	Beşiktaş JK (5)	Fenerbahçe SK
1941–42	Beşiktaş JK (6)	Galatasaray SK
1942–43	Beşiktaş JK (7)	Fenerbahçe SK
1943–44	Fenerbahçe SK (11)	Beşiktaş JK
1944–45	Beşiktaş JK (8)	Fenerbahçe SK
1945–46	Beşiktaş JK (9)	Fenerbahçe SK
1946–47	Fenerbahçe SK (12)	Vefa SK
1947–48	Fenerbahçe SK (13)	Beşiktaş JK
1948–49	Galatasaray SK (12)	Beşiktaş JK
1949–50	Beşiktaş JK (10)	Fenerbahçe SK
1950–51	Beşiktaş JK (11)	Galatasaray SK
1952	Beşiktaş JK (12)	Galatasaray SK
1952–53	Fenerbahçe SK (14)	Beşiktaş JK
1953–54	Beşiktaş JK (13)	Galatasaray SK
1954–55	Galatasaray SK (13)	Beşiktaş JK
1955–56	Galatasaray SK (14)	Fenerbahçe SK
1956–57	Fenerbahçe SK (15)	Galatasaray SK
1957–58	Galatasaray SK (15)	Fenerbahçe SK
1958–59	Fenerbahçe SK (16)	Galatasaray SK

=== Istanbul Sunday League (İstanbul Pazar Ligi) ===
- 1905 HMS Imogene FC
- 1906 Cadi-Keuy FC
- 1907 Cadi-Keuy FC
- 1908 Moda FC
- 1909 Galatasaray SK
- 1910 Galatasaray SK
- 1911 Galatasaray SK
- 1912 Fenerbahçe SK
- 1913 Unaccomplished due to the Balkan Wars
- 1914 Fenerbahçe SK
- 1915 Galatasaray SK & Fenerbahçe SK

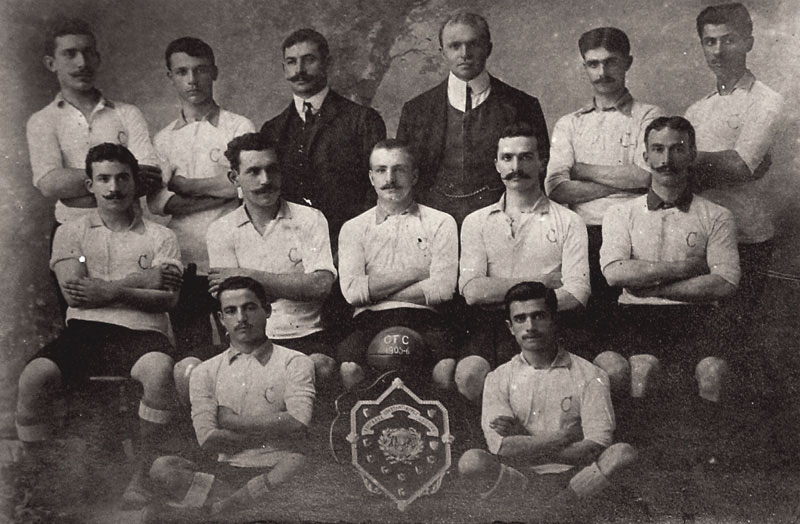
Cadikeuy Football Club 1905-06 Champion

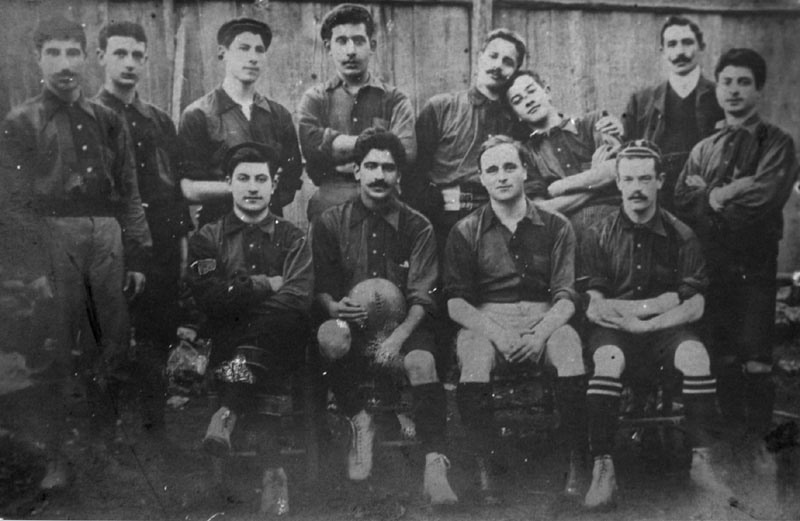
Moda FC 1907-08 Champion

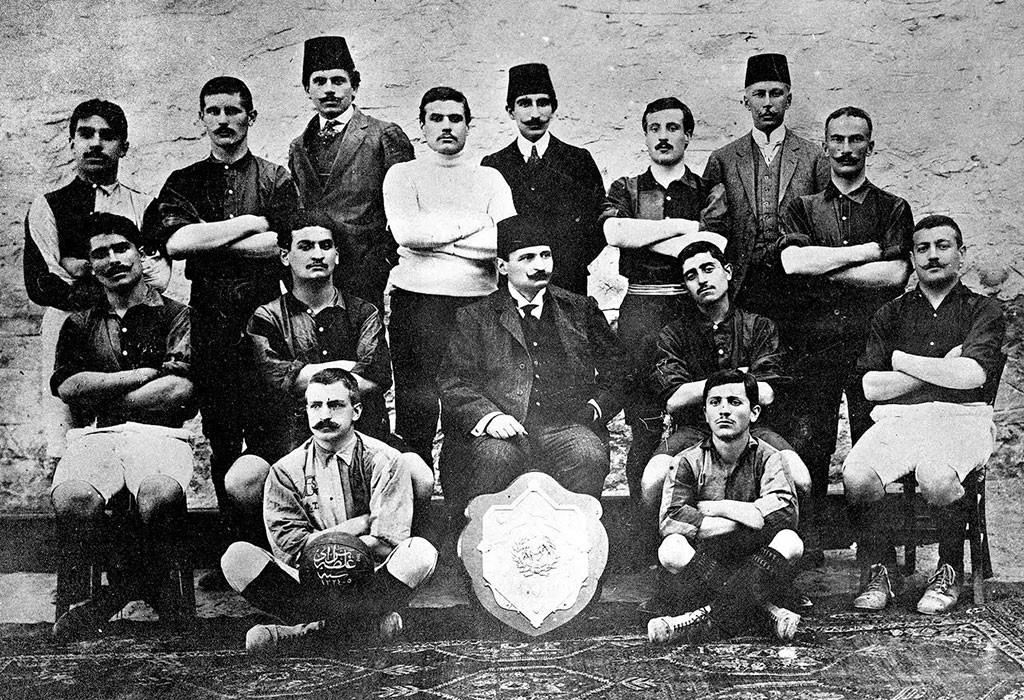
Galatasaray SK 1908-09 Champion

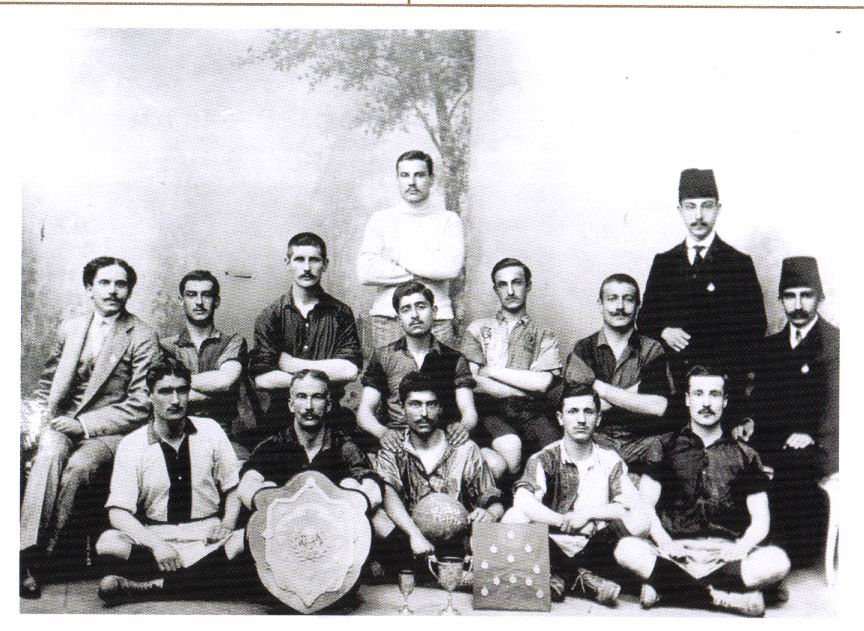
Galatasaray SK 1909-10 Champion

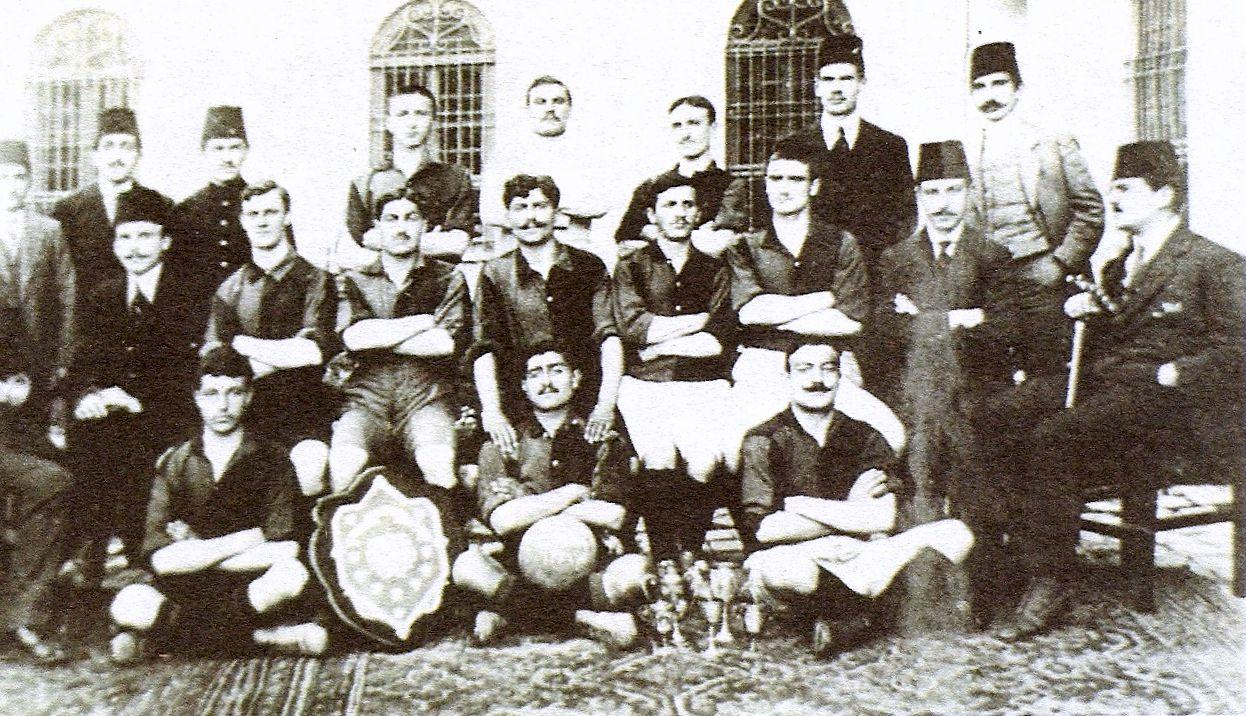
Galatasaray SK 1910-11 Champion

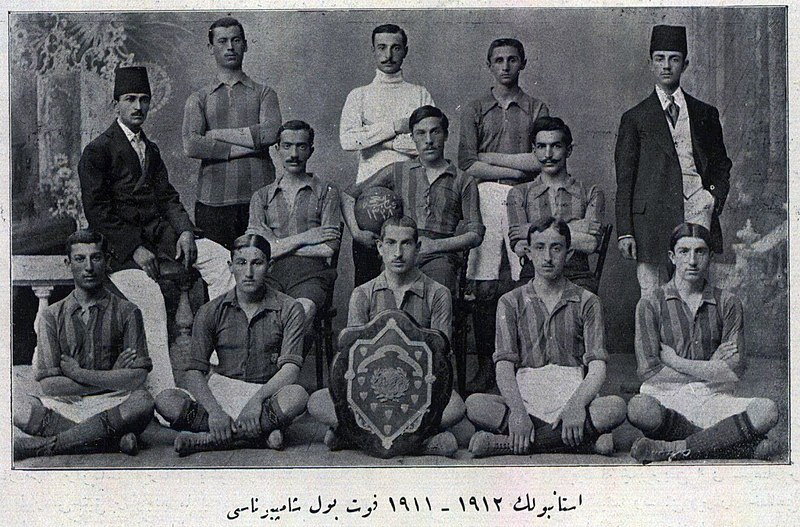
Fenerbahçe SK 1911-12 Champion

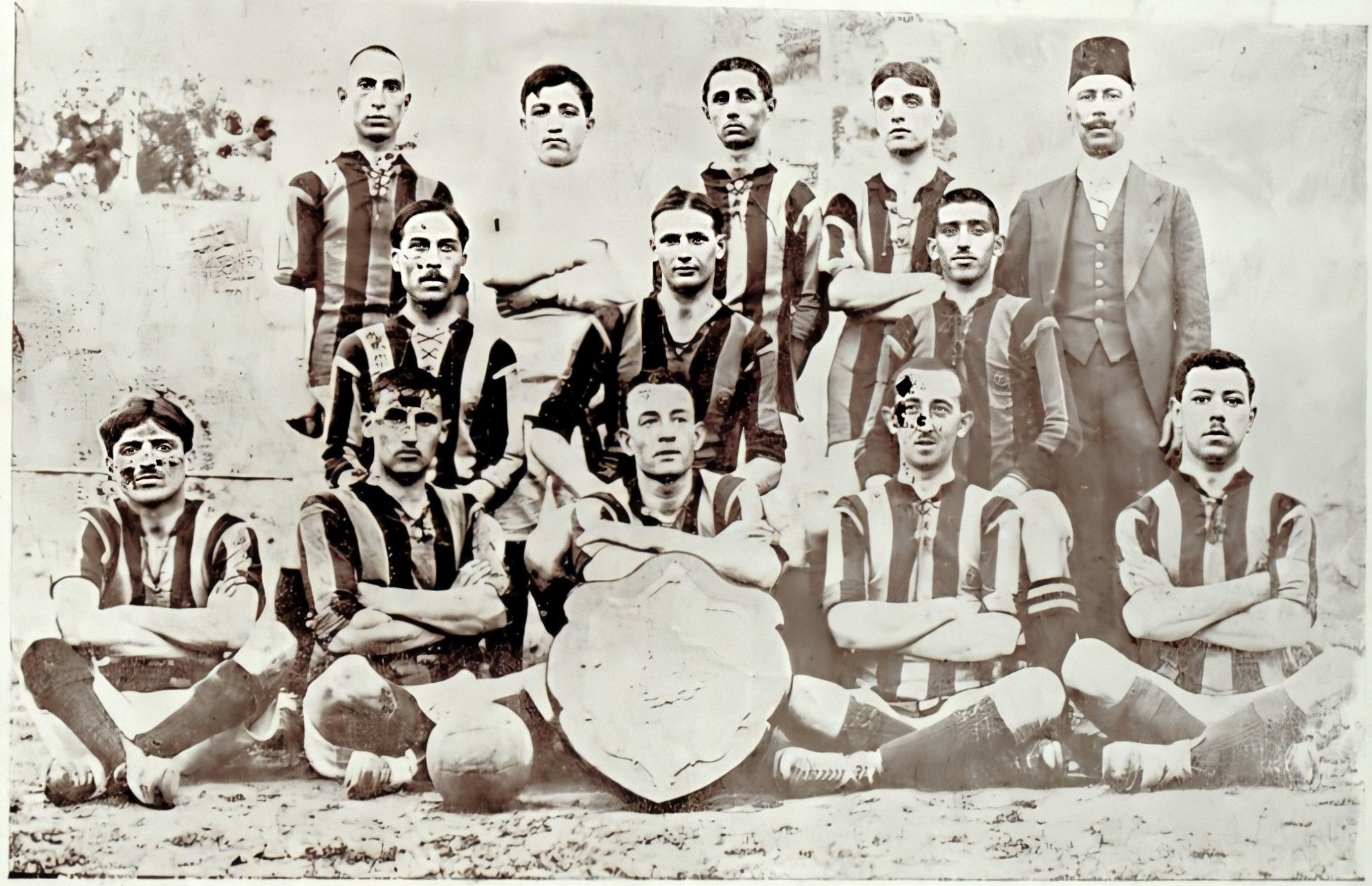
Fenerbahçe SK 1913-14 Champion

=== Istanbul Friday League (İstanbul Cuma Ligi) ===
- 1916 Galatasaray SK
- 1917 Altınordu İdman Yurdu
- 1918 Altınordu İdman Yurdu
- 1919 Unaccomplished due to Mudros Armistice
- 1920 Cancelled
- 1921 Fenerbahçe SK
- 1922 Galatasaray SK
- 1923 Fenerbahçe SK

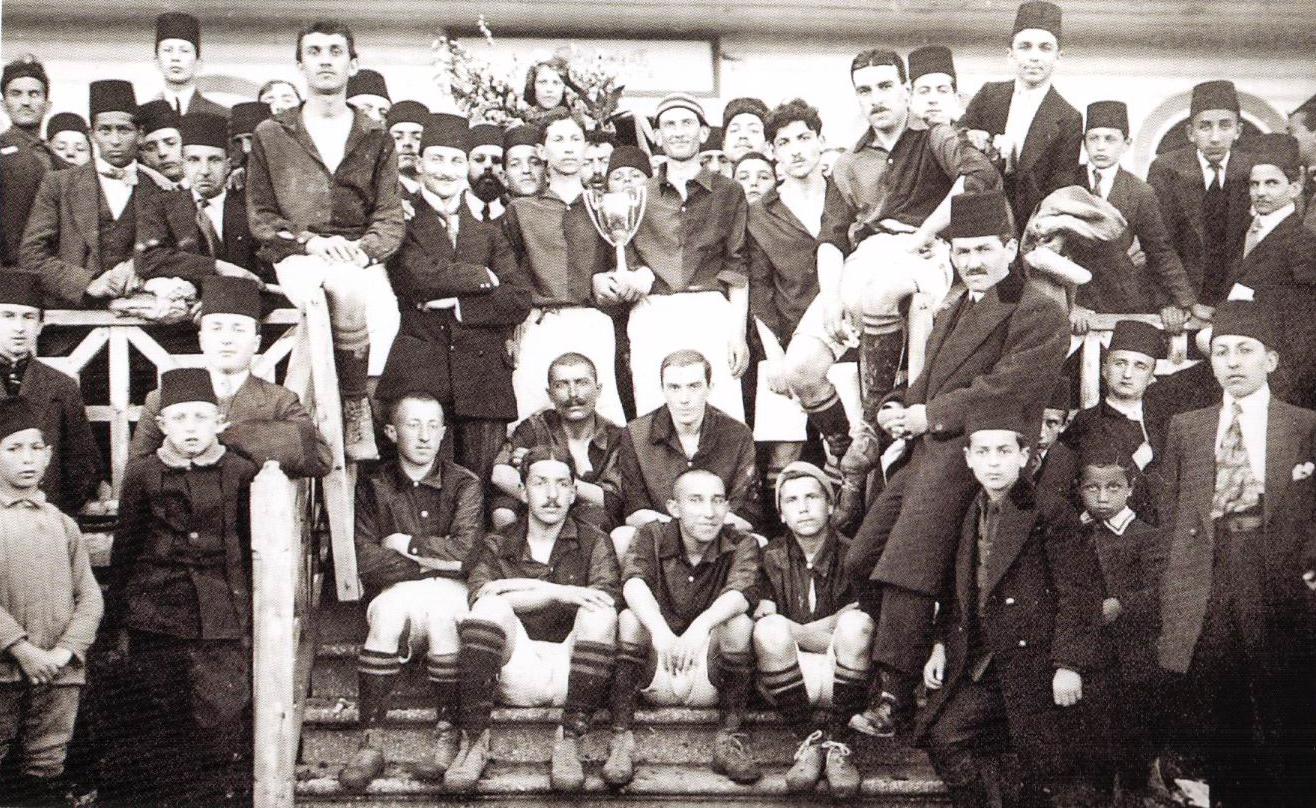
Galatasaray SK 1915-16 Champion

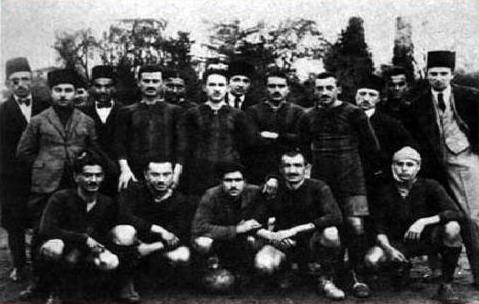
Altınordu İdman Yurdu 1916-17 and 1917-18 Champion

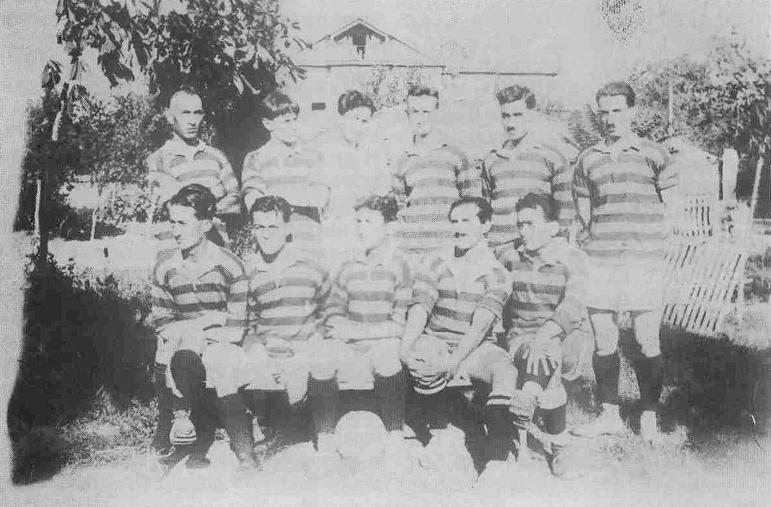
Fenerbahçe SK 1920-21 Champion

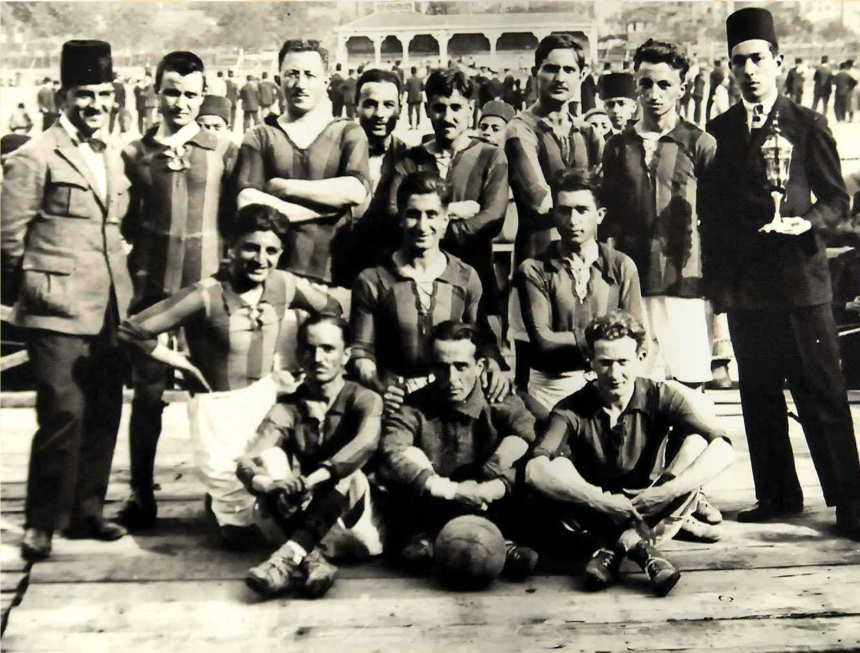
Galatasaray SK 1921-22 Champion

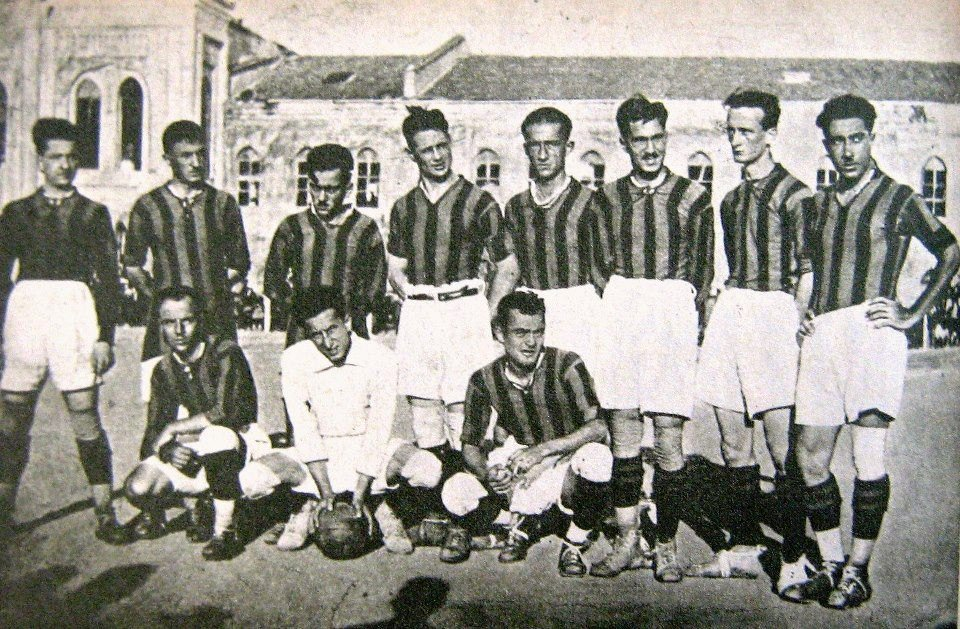
Fenerbahçe SK 1922-23 Champion

=== Istanbul League (İstanbul Ligi) ===
- 1924 Beşiktaş JK
- 1925 Galatasaray SK
- 1926 Galatasaray SK
- 1927 Galatasaray SK
- 1928 Cancelled due to the Summer Olympics in Amsterdam
- 1929 Galatasaray SK
- 1930 Fenerbahçe SK
- 1931 Galatasaray SK
- 1932 İstanbulspor
- 1933 Fenerbahçe SK
- 1934 Beşiktaş JK
- 1935 Fenerbahçe SK
- 1936 Fenerbahçe SK
- 1937 Fenerbahçe SK
- 1938 Güneş SK
- 1939 Beşiktaş JK
- 1940 Beşiktaş JK
- 1941 Beşiktaş JK
- 1942 Beşiktaş JK
- 1943 Beşiktaş JK
- 1944 Fenerbahçe SK
- 1945 Beşiktaş JK
- 1946 Beşiktaş JK
- 1947 Fenerbahçe SK
- 1948 Fenerbahçe SK
- 1949 Galatasaray SK
- 1950 Beşiktaş JK
- 1951 Beşiktaş JK

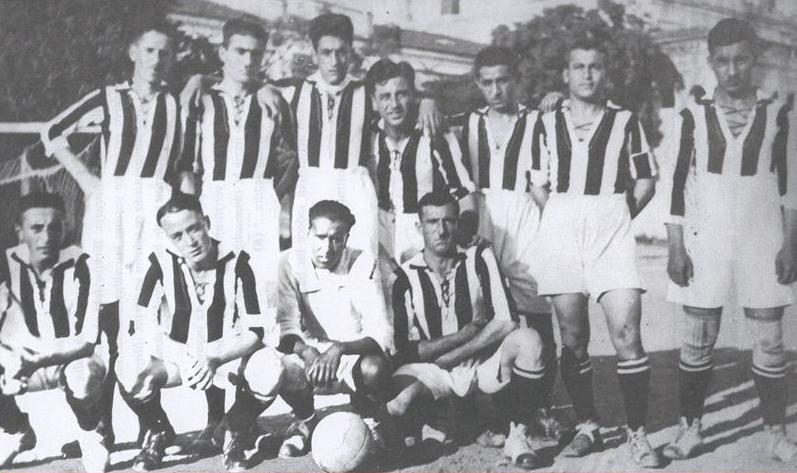
Beşiktaş JK 1923-24 Champion

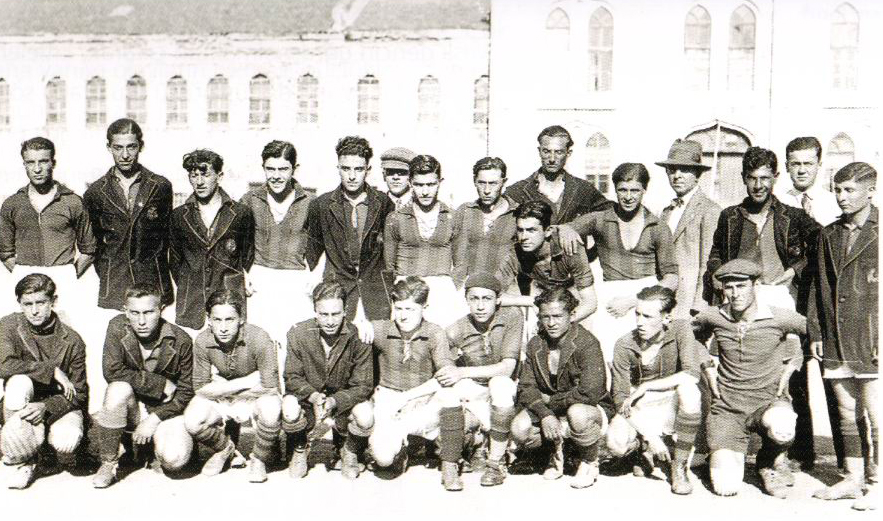
Galatasaray SK 1924-25 Champion

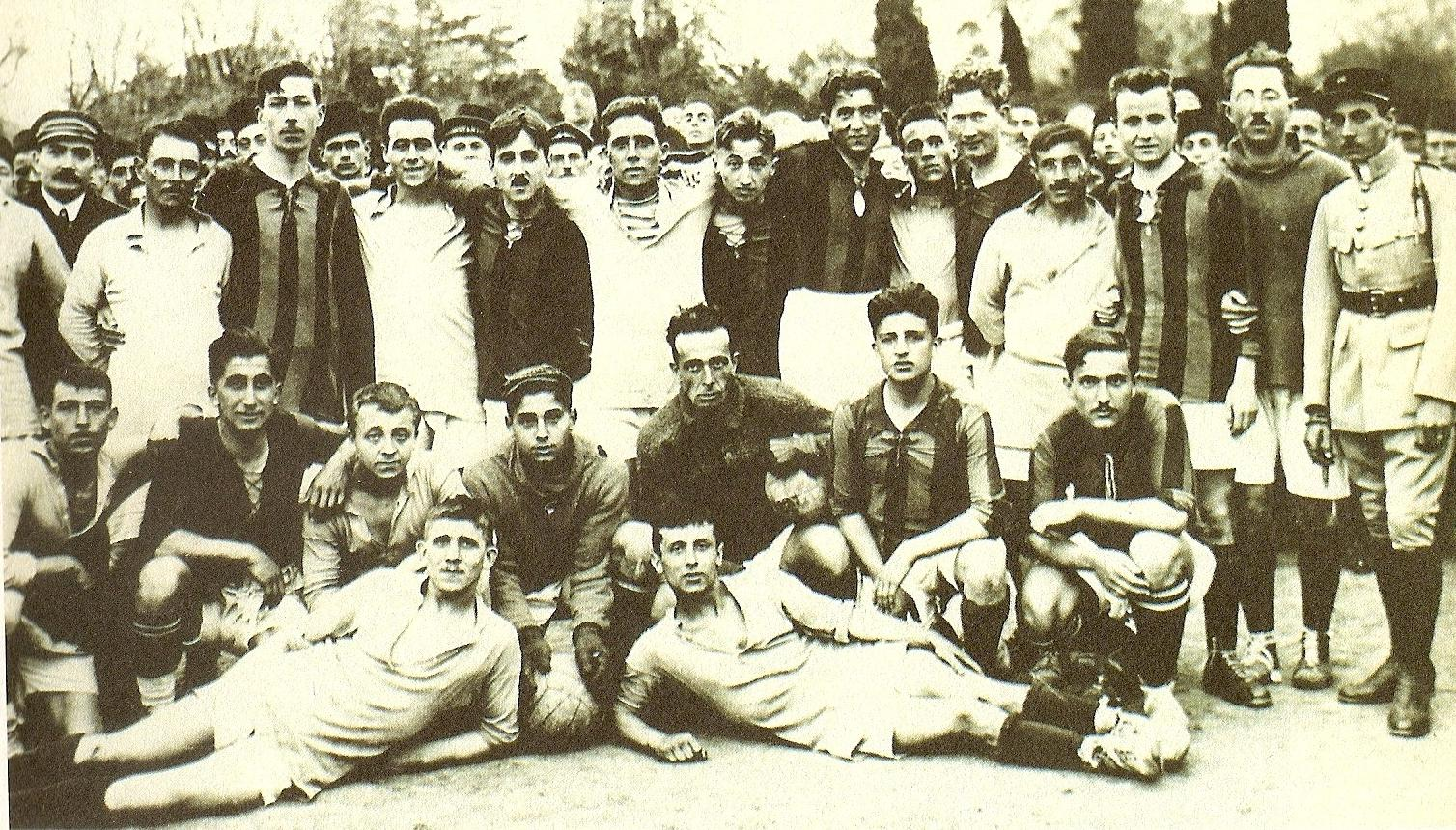
Galatasaray SK 1925-26 Champion

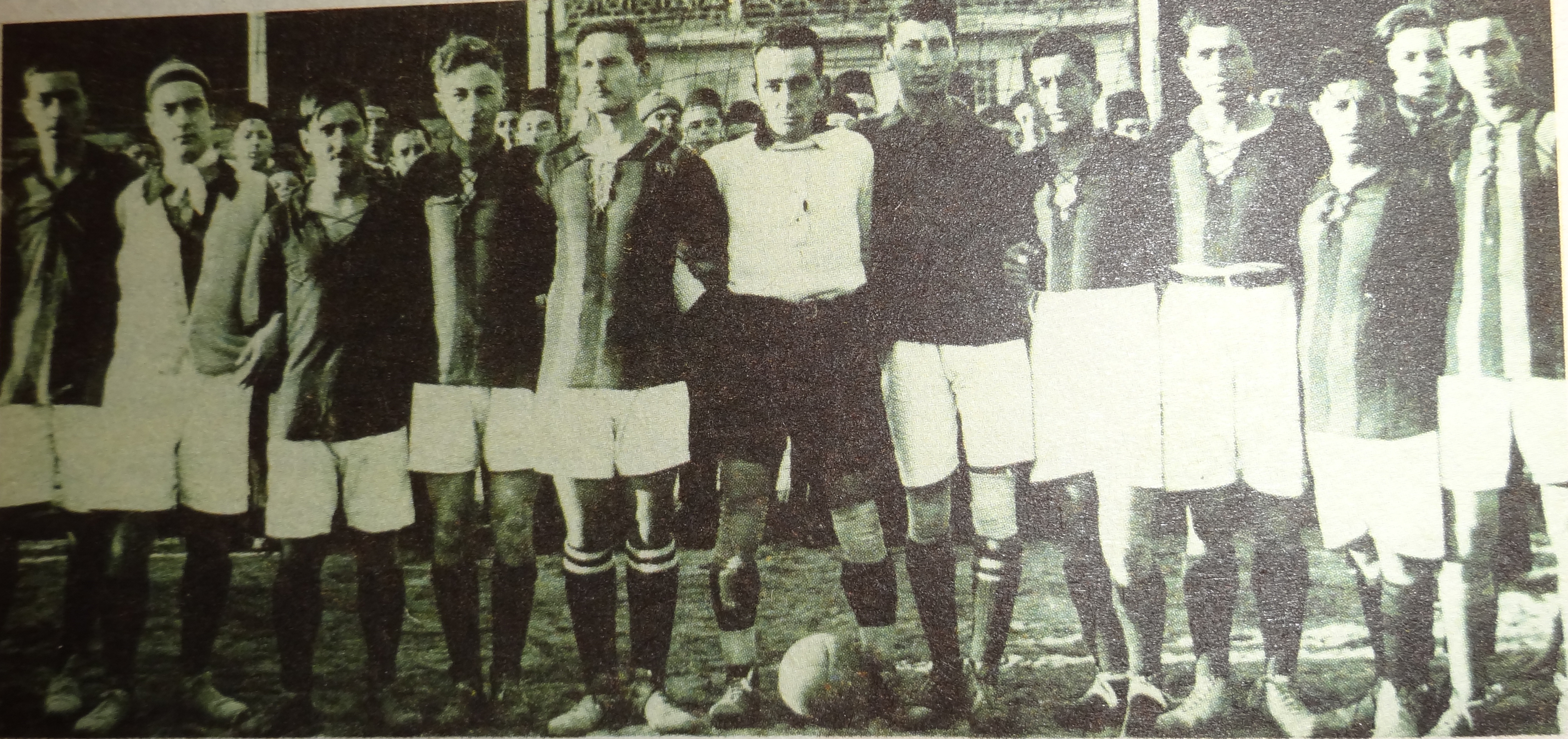
Galatasaray SK 1926-27 Champion

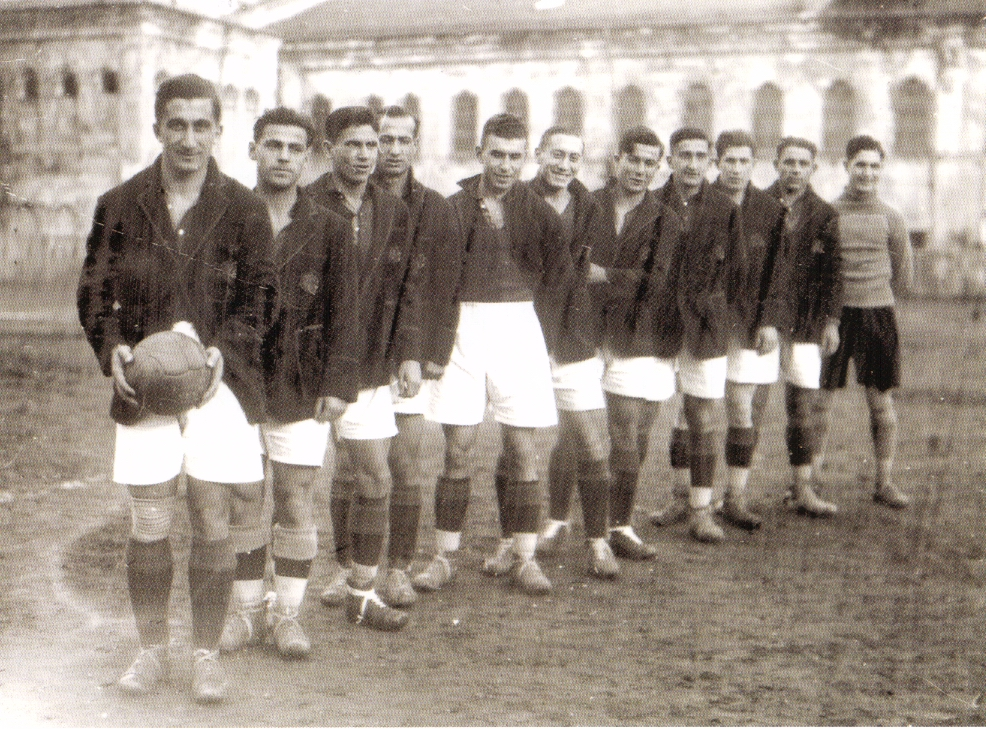
Galatasaray SK 1930-31 Champion

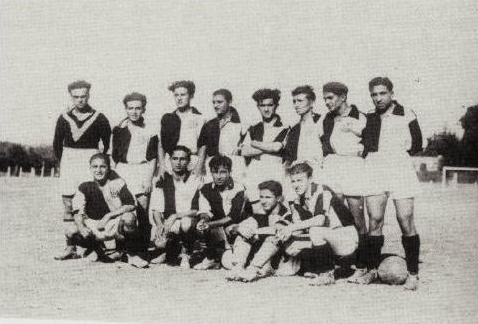
Istanbulspor 1931-32 Champion

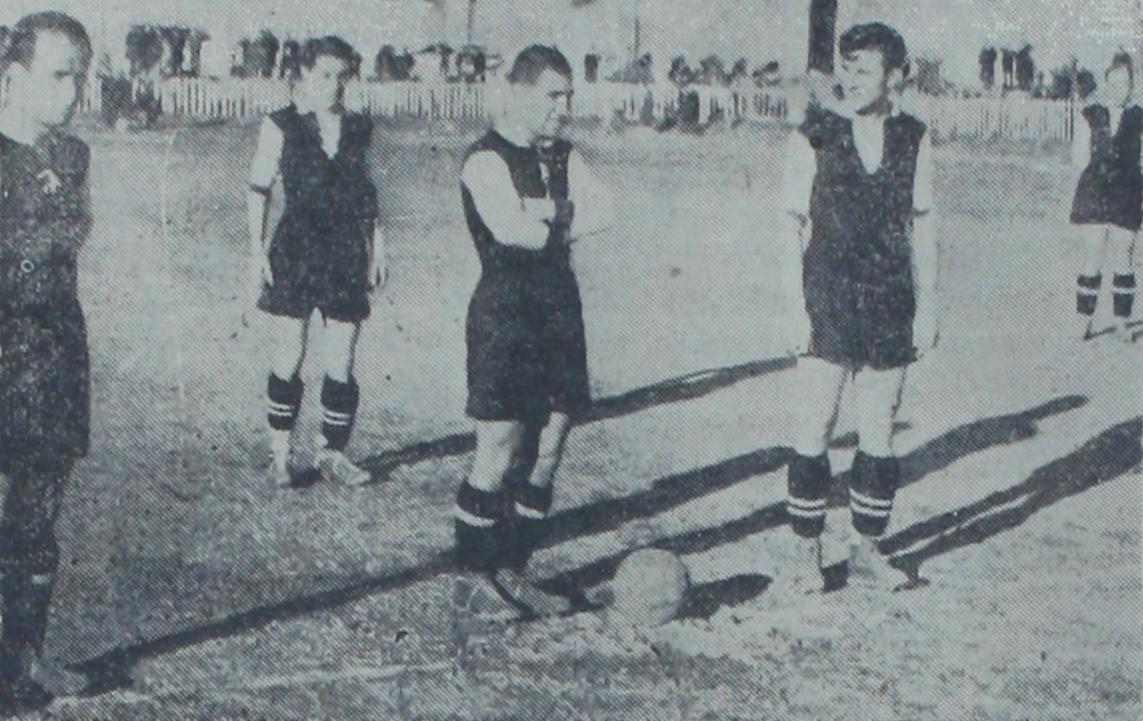
Besiktas JK 1938-39 Champion

=== Istanbul Professional League ===
- 1952 Beşiktaş JK
- 1953 Fenerbahçe SK
- 1954 Beşiktaş JK
- 1955 Galatasaray SK
- 1956 Galatasaray SK
- 1957 Fenerbahçe SK
- 1958 Galatasaray SK
- 1959 Fenerbahçe SK

== Performance by club ==
Club	Titles	Runners-up	Seasons won
Fenerbahçe SK	16	18	1912, 1914, 1915*, 1921, 1923, 1930, 1933, 1935, 1936, 1937, 1944, 1947, 1948, 1953, 1957, 1959
Galatasaray SK	15	13	1909, 1910, 1911, 1915*, 1916, 1922, 1925, 1926, 1927, 1929, 1931, 1949, 1955, 1956, 1958
Beşiktaş JK	13	6	1924, 1934, 1939, 1940, 1941, 1942, 1943, 1945, 1946, 1950, 1951, 1952, 1954
Altınordu İdman Yurdu	2	3	1917, 1918
Cadi-Keuy FC	2	1	1906, 1907
Moda FC	1	3	1908
HMS Imogene	1	1	1905
Güneş SK	1	1	1938
İstanbulspor	1	–	1932
Üsküdar Anadolu SK	–	2	–
Vefa SK	–	2	–
Rumblers FC	–	1	–
Strugglers FC	–	1	–
Küçükçekmece SK	–	1	–

*Galatasaray in the Istanbul Football Union League and Fenerbahçe in the Istanbul Champions League became champions.

== Top Scorers ==
Season	Club	Top scorer	Goals	Matches	Rate
1928–29	Fenerbahçe SK	(Turkey) Zeki Rıza Sporel (1)	10	9	1.11
1929–30	Fenerbahçe SK	(Turkey) Zeki Rıza Sporel (2)	13	10	1.3
1930–31	Fenerbahçe SK	(Turkey) Zeki Rıza Sporel (3)	17	13	1.31
	Fenerbahçe SK	(Turkey) Fikret Arıcan (1)	17	14	1.21
1931–32	Beşiktaş JK	(Turkey) Hakkı Yeten (1)	8	5	1.60
1932–33	Beşiktaş JK	(Turkey) Hakkı Yeten (2)	10	11	0.91
1933–34	Beşiktaş JK	(Turkey) Hakkı Yeten (3)	10	12	0.83
1934–35	Fenerbahçe SK	(Turkey) Namık Erbay (1)	13	11	1.18
1935–36	Fenerbahçe SK	(Turkey) Ali Rıza Tansı (1)	19	21	0.90
	Fenerbahçe SK	(Turkey) Naci Bastoncu (1)	19	21	0.90
1936–37	Fenerbahçe SK	(Turkey) Esat Kaner (1)	14	10	1.40
1937–38	Beşiktaş JK	(Turkey) Şeref Görkey (1)	16	9	1.78
1938–39	Fenerbahçe SK	(Turkey) Fikret Arıcan (2)	25	15	1.67
1939–40	Galatasaray SK	(Turkey) Cemil Gürgen Erlertürk (1)	30	16	1.88
1940–41	Beşiktaş JK	(Turkey) Şeref Görkey (2)	22	15	1.47
1941–42	Fenerbahçe SK	(Turkey) Melih Kotanca (1)	23	14	1.64
1942–43	Galatasaray SK	(Turkey) Cemil Gürgen Erlertürk (2)	22	11	2.00
1943–44	Beşiktaş JK	(Turkey) Şükrü Gülesin (1)	27	17	1.59
	Fenerbahçe SK	(Turkey) Müzdat Yetkiner (1)	27	16	1.69
1944–45	Beşiktaş JK	(Turkey) Kemal Gülçelik (1)	27	18	1.50
1945–46	Beşiktaş JK	(Turkey) Şükrü Gülesin (2)	11	13	0.85
1946–47	Beşiktaş JK	(Turkey) Şükrü Gülesin (3)	9	14	0.64
	Galatasaray SK	(Turkey) Reha Eken (1)	9	12	0.75
1947–48	Fenerbahçe SK	(Turkey) Halit Deringör (1)	12	13	0.92
	Fenerbahçe SK	(Turkey) Lefter Küçükandonyadis (1)	12	14	0.86
1948–49	Beşiktaş JK	(Turkey) Şükrü Gülesin (4)	13	12	1.08
1949–50	Beşiktaş JK	(Turkey) Bülent Esel (1)	19	14	1.36
1950–51	Beşiktaş JK	(Turkey) Recep Adanır (1)	13	14	1.36
1952	Beşiktaş JK	(Turkey) Şevket Yorulmaz (1)	19	14	1.36
1952–53	Beşiktaş JK	(Turkey) Şevket Yorulmaz (2)	17	18	0.94
1953–54	Fenerbahçe SK	(Turkey) Lefter Küçükandonyadis (2)	14	14	1.00
1954–55	Galatasaray SK	(Turkey) Ali Beratlıgil (1)	14	18	0.78
1955–56	Galatasaray SK	(Turkey) Metin Oktay (1)	19	17	1.12
1956–57	Galatasaray SK	(Turkey) Metin Oktay (2)	17	16	1.06
1957–58	Galatasaray SK	(Turkey) Metin Oktay (3)	19	17	1.12
1958–59	Galatasaray SK	(Turkey) Metin Oktay (4)	22	16	1.38

== Records ==
=== Titles ===
- Most titles: 16
  - Fenerbahçe SK
- Most consecutive titles: 5
  - Beşiktaş JK (1938–39, 1939–40, 1940–41, 1941–42, 1942–43)

=== Biggest wins ===
- 20–0, Galatasaray SK vs Vefa SK, 1925–26
- 16–0, Fenerbahçe SK vs Anadolu Üsküdar 1908, 1930–31
- 14–0, Fenerbahçe SK vs Topkapı SK, 1938–39
- 14–0, Fenerbahçe SK vs Topkapı SK, 1939–40
- 14–1, Galatasaray SK vs Anadolu Üsküdar 1908, 1914–15
- 13–0, Fenerbahçe SK vs Süleymaniye SK, 1930–31
- 13–0, Beşiktaş JK vs Hilal SK, 1939–40
- 13–1, Fenerbahçe SK vs Davutpaşa SK, 1942–43
- 12–0, Fenerbahçe SK vs Süleymaniye SK, 1915–16
- 12–0, Beşiktaş JK vs Topkapı SK, 1939–40
- 12–1, Galatasaray SK vs Topkapı SK, 1936–37
- 12–1, Beşiktaş JK vs Taksim SK, 1941–42
- 11–0, Galatasaray SK vs Moda-Imogene Muhteliti, 1909–10
- 10–0, Galatasaray SK vs Süleymaniye SK, 1934–35
- 11–2, Beşiktaş JK vs Eyüp SK, 1936–37
- 11–2, Galatasaray SK vs Eyüp SK, 1937–38
- 11–2, Beşiktaş JK vs Eyüp SK, 1937–38
- 11–2, Beşiktaş JK vs Kasımpaşa SK, 1943–44
- 11–2, Beşiktaş JK vs İstanbulspor, 1943–44
