= 1950–51 Istanbul Football League =

Istanbul Football League
- Season: 1950–51
- Champions: Beşiktaş JK (11th title)

The 1950–51 İstanbul Football League season was the 41st season of the league. Beşiktaş JK won the league for the 11th time.

== Season ==
Pos	Team	Pld	W	D	L	GF	GA	GD	Pts
1	Beşiktaş JK	14	10	3	1	39	8	+31	37
2	Galatasaray SK	14	10	2	2	28	14	+14	36
3	Vefa SK	14	9	1	4	29	14	+15	33
4	Fenerbahçe SK	14	7	2	5	31	14	+17	29 (Note: 1 point deducted?)
5	İstanbulspor	14	6	3	5	18	23	−5	29
6	Kasımpaşa SK	14	2	3	9	13	39	−26	21
7	Emniyet SK	14	1	4	9	10	32	−22	20
8	Beykoz 1908 S.K.D.	14	1	2	11	11	35	−24	18
