= Alibeyköy S.K. =

Alibeyköyspor
- Full name: Alibeyköy Spor Kulübü
- Founded: 1950
- Stadium: Alibeyköy Stadyumu
- Capacity: 3,500
- Chairman: Mehmet Duman
- Manager: Rahmi Kalkan
- League: Turkish Regional Amateur League
Home colours	Away colours

Alibeyköy S.K. is a Turkish sports club based in Alibeyköy quarter of Eyüp, Istanbul. It was founded in 1950 as Adaletspor, or Adalet SK Istanbul, with red-white colours. It changed its name as Alibeyköy Adalet in 1971 and its colours as orange-blue. In 1980 it was finally changed into Alibeyköyspor. The orange-blue side played in the Second League between 1980–1985. They are currently playing in the Turkish Regional Amateur League.

== League participations ==
- Turkish Super League: 1959–60
- TFF First League: 1980–85
- TFF Second League: 1970–80, 1985–89, 1999–01, 2007–09
- TFF Third League: 2001–07, 2009–10, 2018–19
- Turkish Regional Amateur League: 2010–11, 2017–18, 2019–22, 2023–
- Amateur Leagues: 1950–59, 1960–70, 1989–99, 2011–2017, 2022–23
