= The Children of Niobe =

Novel by Tasos Athanasiadis

The children of Niobe
- First book Cover
- Author: Tasos Athanasiadis
- Original title: Τα παιδιά της Νιόβης - The children of Niobe
- Language: Greek
- Genre: Novel
- Publisher: The Estia Bookstore
- Publication place: Greece
- Pages: 1.694 pp (total of 4 books)
- ISBN: 978-960-05-0588-7 (1st Book); ISBN 978-960-05-0589-4 (2nd Book); ISBN 978-960-05-0668-6 (3rd Book); ISBN 978-960-05-0669-3 (4th Book)
- OCLC: 36559754

The children of Niobe is a novel written by Tasos Athanasiadis. In this novel Athanasiadis describes the way Greeks lived in Anatolia by the example of the small community of Salihli. Probably the title is inspired by the myth of Niobe. In 2004 the novel was serialized on Greek television.

== Plot summary ==
The plot begins in Salihli, showing the town's life before the advent of the Greek Army at the start of the Asia Minor Campaign. Central role played by the family of Michael Anastasiadis or Sarris, a middle-aged notable and banker of Salihli with a charming, clever and cheated 35-years-old wife and four children (3 girls and 1 boy), madly in love with the 16-years-old Tarsi, a beautiful gazelle who refuses to marry the son of the wealthy Turkish businessman, for whom she worked, and enchants everybody with her provocative teen flesh. In the meantime, we are watching the raids of the Turkish gendarmerie and terror they caused to the Greeks, the close relationship of Turks and Greeks as long as the one was not feeling threat from the other, hidden hopes for better days, the every day misdeeds caused by the human weakness and often leading to unexpected misery, mainly focusing on the guiltiness and the passion of Sarris for the 16 years old Tarsi.

Then, the novel described the (initially) pleasant life during the Greek occupation and the contact of the Anatolian Greeks with the Greek soldiers who occupied Salihli to get up to the Destruction of Smyrna. After Sarris dies, his family slightly loses its primary place in the story. The beautiful and poor Tarsi socially rises but remains an erotic symbol of the lustful East. In the presence of the Greek army, dreams of the Greeks for freedom seem to come true. But the error handling follows and the underground system of espionage and undermining that Turks had set in the western Asia Minor, leading to the collapse of the front and the devastating consequences for Asia Minor. The plot follows the Asia Minor refugees and their efforts initially to save and then to find their feet in their new homeland.

In the twelve chapters of the first book, the life just before the Greek occupation in Anatolia is being described.

In the twelve chapters of the second book, the life up to the destruction of İzmir is described.

In the eight chapters of the third book (1st to 8th) and in the seven chapters of the fourth book (9th to 15th) of the novel, the displacement in Greece is being described.

== TV series ==
The novel was serialized in 2004 for the Greek state television ERT. It was directed by Kostas Koutsomytis and starred Grigoris Valtinos (Sarris Anastasiadis), Maria Tzobanaki (Chrysanthi Anastasiadou), Angela Gerekou (Madame Zizi), Angelos Antonopoulos (Tryfon Ioannidis), Antonis Fragakis (Yilmaz Daykal), Tasos Nousias (Tzanis), and Margarita Amarantidou (Tarsi) in the main roles. The plot follows the life of a Greek family led by the wealthy, self-created banker and notable Michalis (or Sarris) Anastasiadis and his wife, Chrysanthi, from Salihli in Anatolia and Sarris' great, forbidden love with the young and virgin maiden Tarsi in the time since the summer of 1917 until the end of the Greco-Turkish War (1919-1922), the family's arrival and settlement in Greece as refugees. The story begins to unfold when Sarris saves the underage beauty Tarsi from forced marriage with the son of her wealthy Turkish employer and subsequent Islamization and then he madly falls in love with her. He starts a passionate sexual relationship with the teenage girl while his wife suspects the cheating and tries to end the affair by pursuing the 17-years-old in order to get married which leads to a series of tragic events. Other important characters of the series are the French widow Madame Zizi, Sarris' business partner and flirt, Tryfon Ioannidis, a Greek publisher, journalist, trader and notable who also serves as the main narrator of the plot, Yilmaz Daykal, a nationalist captain of the Ottoman Gendarmerie and Chrysanthi's love interest, Tzanis Kantaroglou, a famous "Don Juan" and Zizi's young lover, and Anastasiadis family's four adolescent children, Stergios, Roe, Alexa and Taso, alongside their love affairs. The series divided into two seasons and 38 episodes.
