= Ali İhsan Karayiğit =

Turkish footballer

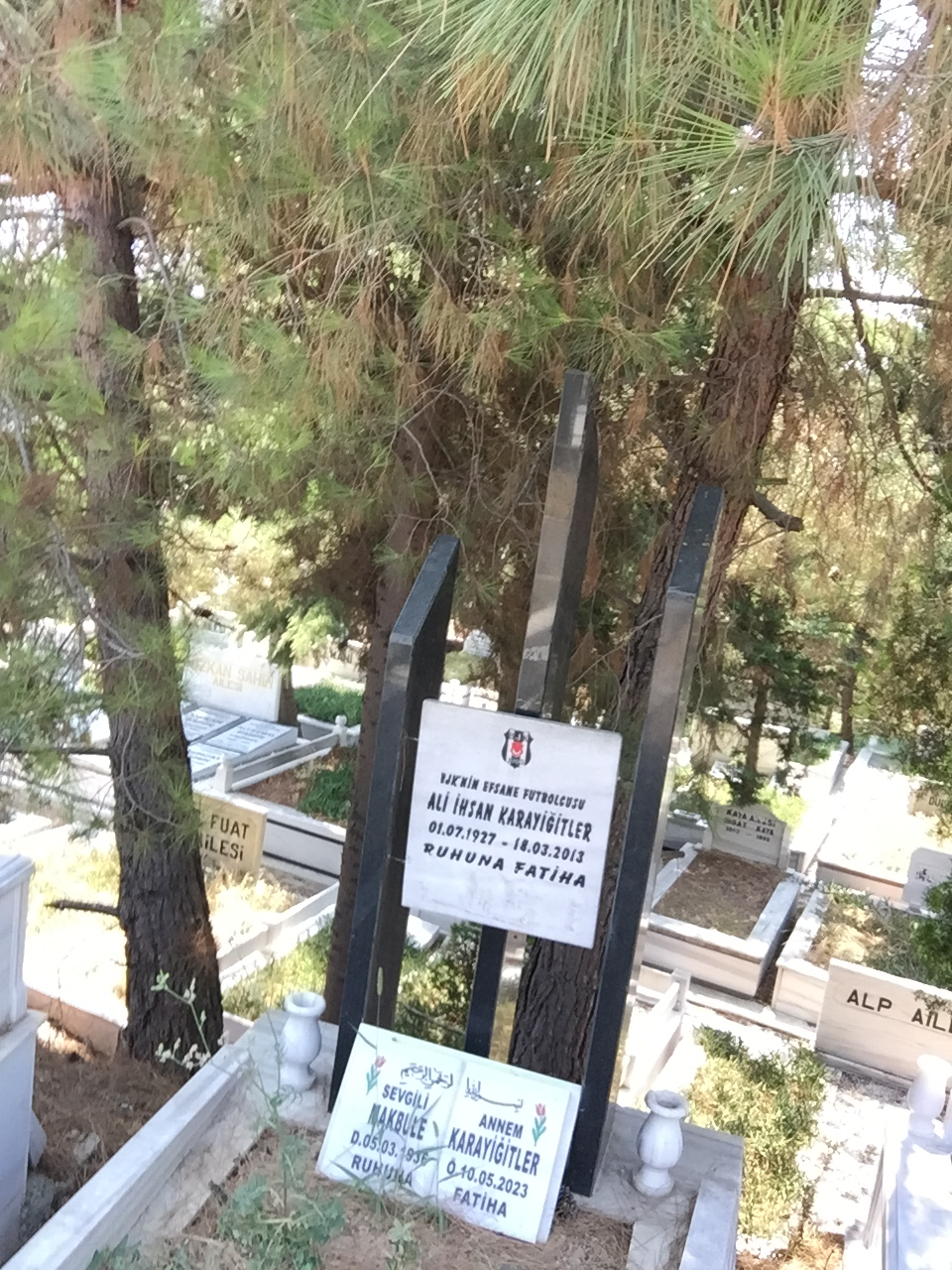
- His grave

Personal information
- Full name: Ali İhsan Karayiğit
- Date of birth: 1927
- Place of birth: Salihli, Turkey
- Date of death: 18 March 2013 (aged 85–86)
- Place of death: Istanbul, Turkey
- Positions: Defender; forward

Youth career
- Salihli

Senior career*
Years	Team	Apps	(Gls)
1948–1958	Beşiktaş	134	(3)
1958–1960	Adalet S.K.	33	(0)

International career
1950–1952	Turkey U-21	5	(0)
1951–1954	Turkey	11	(0)
- * Club domestic league appearances and goals

Ali İhsan Karayiğit (1927 – 18 March 2013) was a Turkish international association football player. He is most known for his spell at Beşiktaş.

== Career ==
Karayiğit started to play football in Salihli district of Manisa. He joined Beşiktaş in 1948. Karayiğit was a party of unbeaten Beşiktaş squad between 1949 and 1950, known as "Yenilmez Armada" in Turkey. He retired his playing career following his spell at Adalet S.K., in 1960.

Following his retirement from active football, he served Beşiktaş J.K. as youth section trainer and member of club's Executive Council. He also worked as a sports columnist.

== Honours ==
Beşiktaş J.K.

- Istanbul Football League: 1952, 1953–54
- Turkish Football Championship: 1951
- Turkish Federation Cup: 1956–57, 1957–58

=== Individual ===
- Beşiktaş J.K., Squads of Century (Golden Team)
