= Bin Tepe =

Lydian burial site

- Bintepe
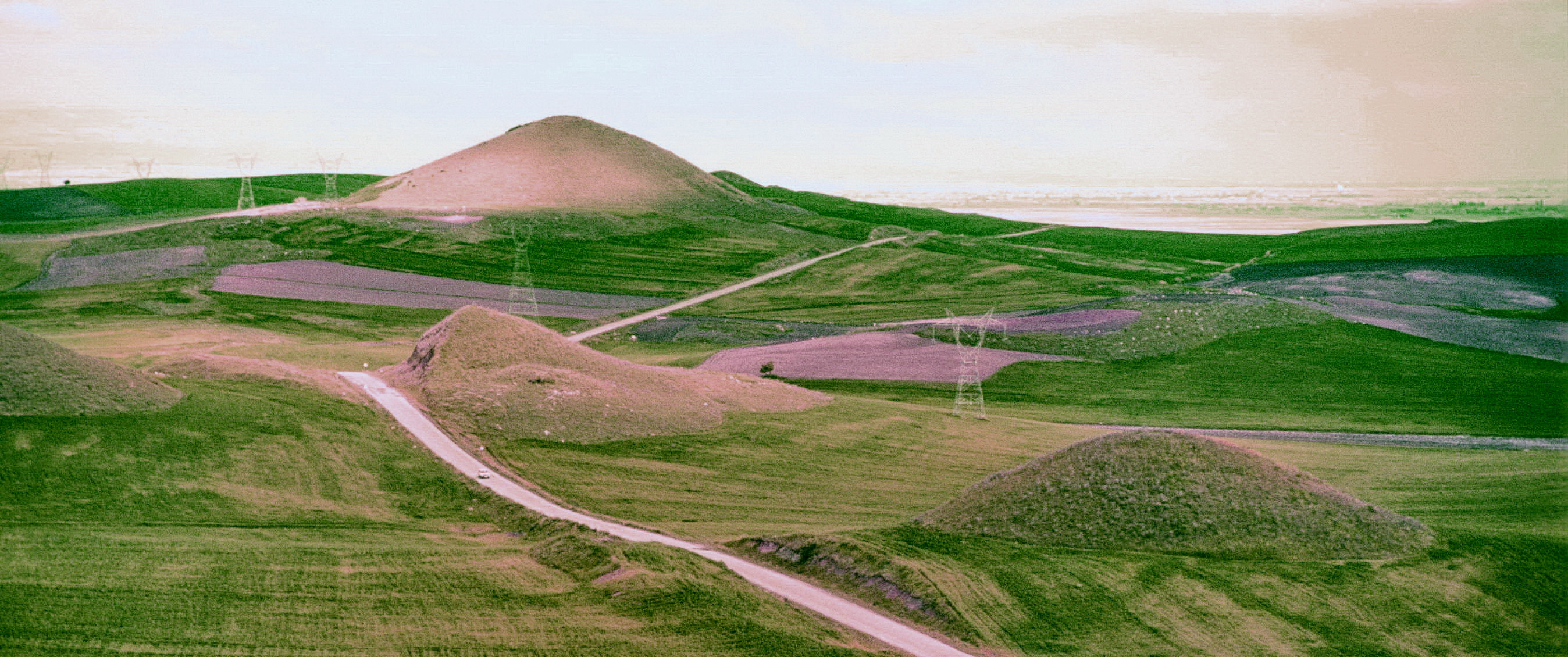

- Location within Turkey
- 38.5800°N 28.0072°E
- Type: Necropolis
- Part of: Lydia

History
- Built: c. 600 BC

Site notes
- Excavation dates: 1854-present

UNESCO World Heritage Site
- Part of: Sardis and the Lydian Tumuli of Bin Tepe
- Criteria: Cultural: iii
- Reference: 1731-002
- Inscription: 2025 (47th Session)

Bin Tepe (lit. "A thousand tells" in Turkish) is an archaeological site on the southern shore of Marmara Lake in Manisa Province, Turkey. Consisting of over 100 tumuli, it served as a cemetery for the elites of nearby Sardis.

In 2025, Bin Tepe was listed as part of a larger UNESCO World Heritage Site including the ancient city of Sardis.

== Site ==
Bin Tepe is an ancient cemetery consisting of over 100 tumuli. Located near the Lydian capital city of Sardis, it served local elites during the Lydian and Achaemenid periods.

Bin Tepe sits on a low limestone ridge to the north of Sardis. Its elevation and proximity to a major travel route made the tumuli conspicuous to ancient travellers, as they continue to be for modern visitors. The site's proximity to earlier Bronze Age settlement mounds suggests that it may have been chosen to provide a symbolic link to the past. The burials were organized in groups, likely corresponding to families or estates. While there were once at least 149 tumuli at the site, there are now only around 115, the others having been destroyed for farmland.

The tumuli consist of stone burial chambers covered by large earthen mounds. The burial chambers were either constructed from slabs or cut into the bedrock, and were generally located off-center to deter grave robbers. Mounds were often ringed with a retaining wall called a "crepis". Crepis walls, many of which no longer survive, gave the mound a defined edge and held the dirt fill in place.

The earliest of the Bin Tepe tumuli date from around 600 BC, seemingly adapted from Phrygian royal burials at the Phrygian capital city of Gordion. The style remained in use after the fall of the Lydian Empire in 546 BC, with many of the datable examples at Bin Tepe having been constructed during the subsequent Persian period. Throughout their period of use at Sardis, they coexisted with other styles including rock-cut tombs and cist graves.

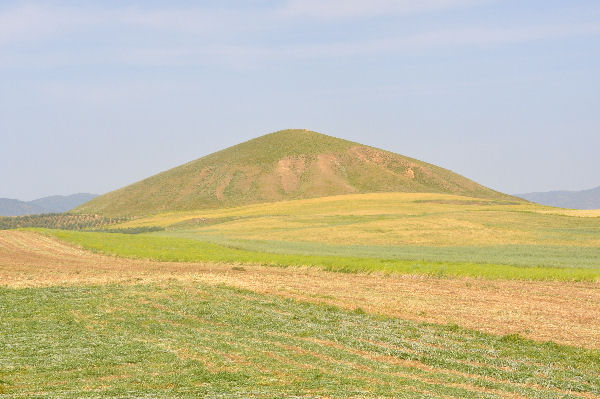
Tumulus of Alyattes

== Major tumuli ==
The Tumulus of Alyattes (Turkish: Koca Mutaf Tepe) is the largest at the site, with a height of 63m, a base diameter of 330m, and a total volume of 785,000 m^{3}. It is generally accepted as the tomb of the Lydian king Alyattes who died in 560 BC. It has been estimated that it would have taken two and a half years to build with 2,400 labourers and 600 beasts of burden. The burial chamber is built from limestone and marble with a style of masonry which reflects Greek and Near Eastern influence. Despite being constructed to deter grave robbers, it was nonetheless heavily looted in antiquity. Few grave goods and no human remains have been found.

Two other tumuli of exceptional size were traditionally identified as tombs of other kings of the Mermnad dynasty, but these identifications are not accepted by modern scholars. The second largest tumulus (Koca Mutaf Tepe) is 53m tall, with a base diameter of 230m, its footprint roughly equal to that of the Great Pyramid at Giza. This tumulus was traditionally attributed to King Gyges, but pottery fragments in the mound show that it post-dates his reign by at least forty years. It appears to have been built over an unfinished smaller tumulus. Archaeologists have speculated that it may have been built for a queen, since its size suggests a royal burial and no other king of the relevant period is a plausible candidate.

== Excavation history ==
Bin Tepe has been a conspicuous feature of the landscape since its construction. The Tumulus of Alyattes was described by Herodotus in his Histories as follows:

But there is one building to be seen there which is more notable than any, saving those of Egypt and Babylon. There is in Lydia the tomb of Alyattes the father of Croesus, the base whereof is made of great stones and the rest of it of mounded earth. It was built by the men of the market and the artificers and the prostitutes. There remained till my time five corner-stones set on the top of the tomb, and on these was graven the record of the work done by each kind: and measurement showed that the prostitutes' share of the work was the greatest.

— Herodotus 1-93.

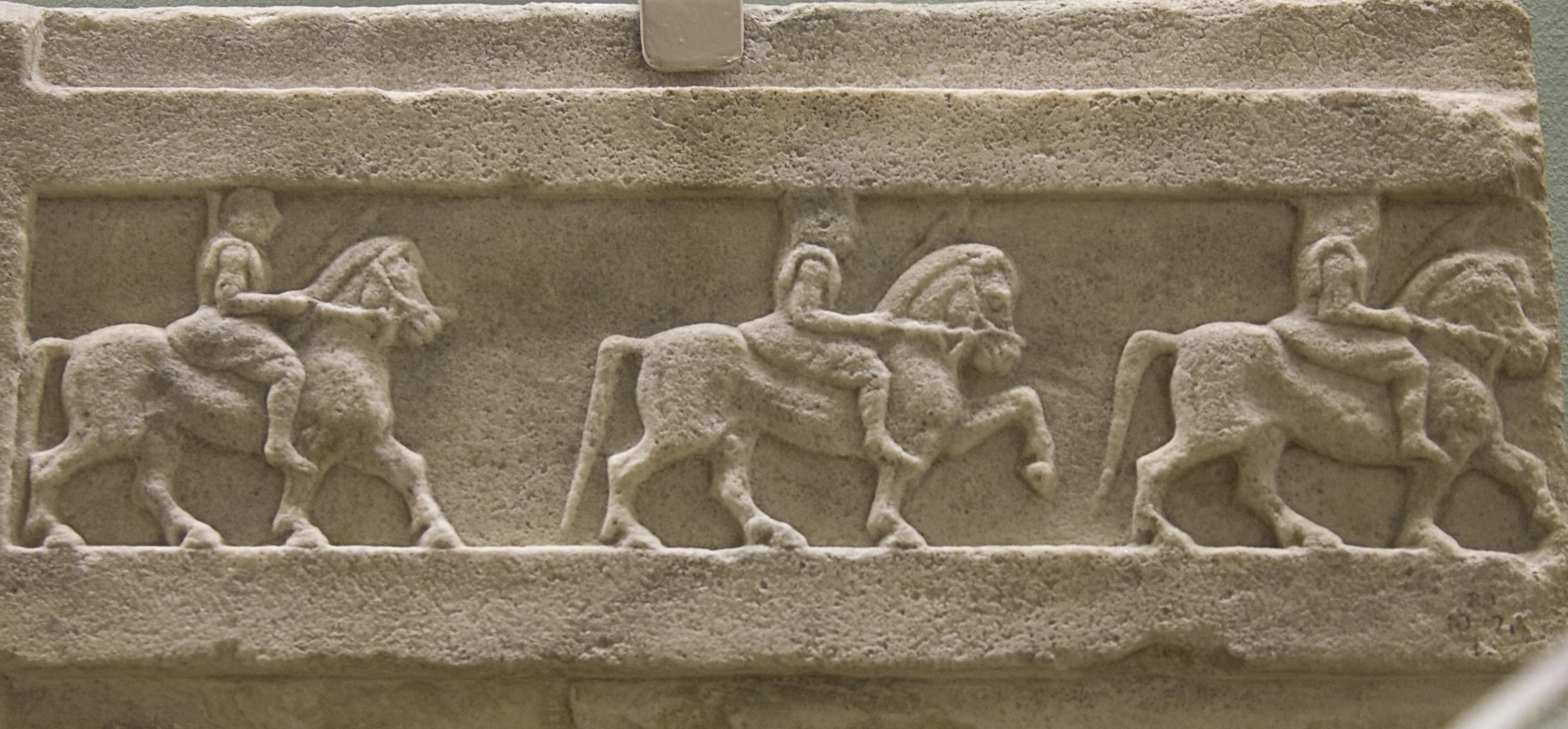
Relief from a Persian-era burial at Bin Tepe.

The tumuli have been thoroughly looted since ancient times, destroying much of the archaeological evidence they once contained. The first systematic study was carried out by Prussian consul Ludwig Peter Spiegelthal, who excavated the Tumulus of Alyattes in 1853. Archaeological excavation of the other tumuli began in 1880 and continue to the present day. Despite the looters' destruction, remaining evidence has provided insight into Lydian society and beliefs. The tumuli are particularly important for our understanding of the Persian Period of Lydian history, which is much better attested at Bin Tepe than it is at Sardis itself.

== See also ==
- Limantepe
- Karun treasure
- Kaymakçı (archaeological site)
- Troy
