= Sart mine =

Gold mine in Salihli, Manisa, Turkey

Coordinates: 40.501°N 39.387°E

Sart Gold Mine
- Interactive map of Sart Gold Mine
- Location: Salihli, Manisa Province,Turkey
- Products: Gold
- Company: POMZA EXPORT
- Website: http://www.pomzaexport.com/

The Sart mine is a gold mine in Turkey. The mine is operated by the Turkish conglomerate POMZA EXPORT. The mine is located in Salihli of Manisa Province in western Turkey. It is detected that there are 1,9 tonnes of gold in the mine.
