= Necropolis =

Large cemetery with elaborate tomb monuments

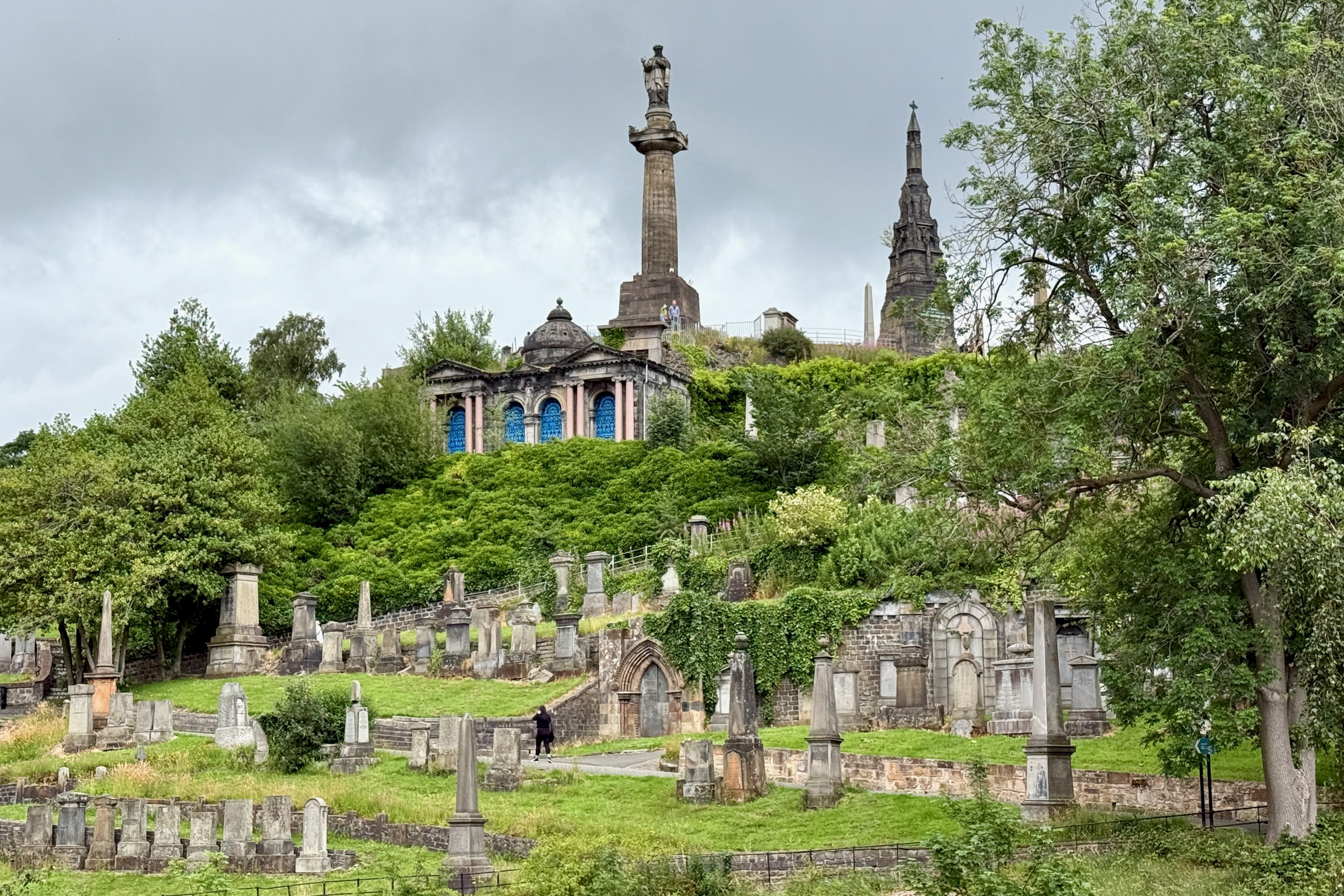
Graves at the Glasgow Necropolis in Scotland

A necropolis (pl.: necropolises, necropoles, necropoleis, necropoli) is a large, designed cemetery of an ancient city, typically containing elaborate tombs and funerary monuments, however some consist primarily of simple graves or rock-cut burials. The name stems from the Ancient Greek νεκρόπολις nekropolis (lit. 'city of the dead').

The term usually implies a separate burial site at a distance from a city, as opposed to tombs within cities, which were common in various places and periods of history. They are different from grave fields, which did not have structures or markers above the ground. While the word is most commonly used for ancient sites, the name was revived in the early 19th century and applied to planned city cemeteries, such as the Glasgow Necropolis.

== In the ancient world ==
=== Egypt ===
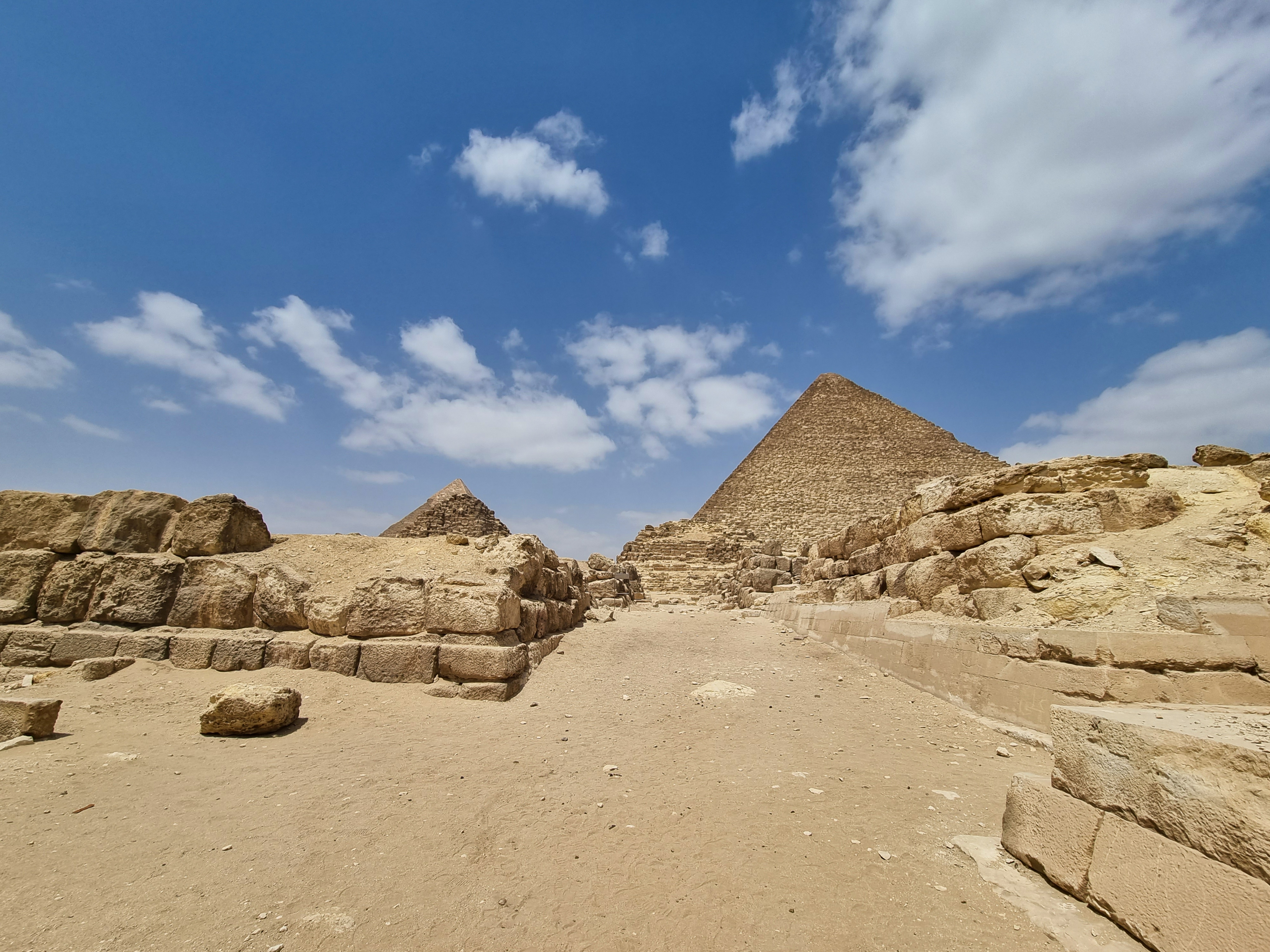
Mastabas in the Giza Necropolis with the pyramids of Khufu and Khafre in the background

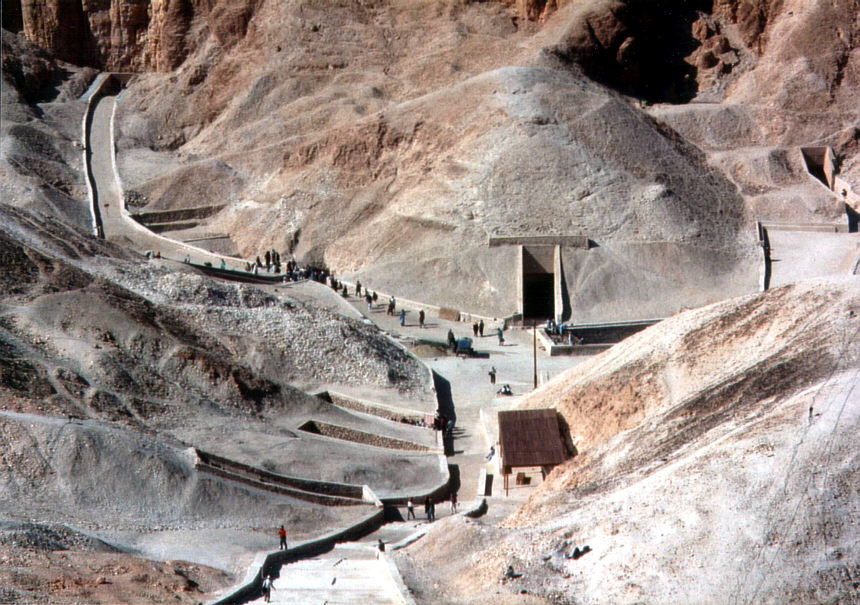
Entrances to rock-cut tombs in the Valley of the Kings in the Theban Necropolis

Ancient Egypt is noted for multiple necropoleis and they are major archaeological sites for Egyptology. Ancient Egyptian funerary practices and beliefs about the afterlife led to the construction of several extensive necropoleis to secure and provision the dead in the hereafter.

Probably the best-known one is the Giza Necropolis. Made famous by the Great Pyramid of Giza, which was included in the Seven Wonders of the Ancient World, the necropolis includes three major pyramid tombs of Old Kingdom kings and several smaller pyramids related to the royal burials, as well as mastabas (a typical royal tomb of the early Dynastic period, which continued to be used for lesser royals, high nobility, and senior officials into the First Intermediate Period) and tombs and graveyards for lesser personages.The pyramids at Giza, especially the Great Pyramid of Khufu, are awe-inspiring structures that have stood the test of time for thousands of years.

Almost as well known as Giza is the Theban Necropolis, on the west bank of the Nile at Thebes (modern Luxor). This necropolis is known for the rock-cut tombs of the Valley of the Kings, the Valley of the Queens, and the various tombs of nobles and others from the New Kingdom onward. The Theban Necropolis is home to some of the few Ancient Egyptian tombs that remained essentially intact until discovery by modern archaeologists, including the Tomb of Tutankhamun and the Tomb of Kha and Merit.

Other ancient Egyptian necropoleis of note are the necropolis of Saqqara, home to the Step Pyramid of Djoser and other royal burials; the necropolis of Dahshur, site of the Red Pyramid of Sneferu, the oldest "true" pyramid; and Abydos, site of a necropolis containing burials from the Predynastic through the Late Period. A pair of small necropoleis of Theban-style rock-cut tombs started to take shape in the wadis east of Akhetaten (modern Amarna) during the Amarna Period of the New Kingdom; while it appears that the tombs were not ultimately used for burials due to the collapse of the Amarna regime about 20 years after the foundation of Akhetaten, the tomb decorations provide much information about that era of ancient Egyptian history.

=== Etruria ===
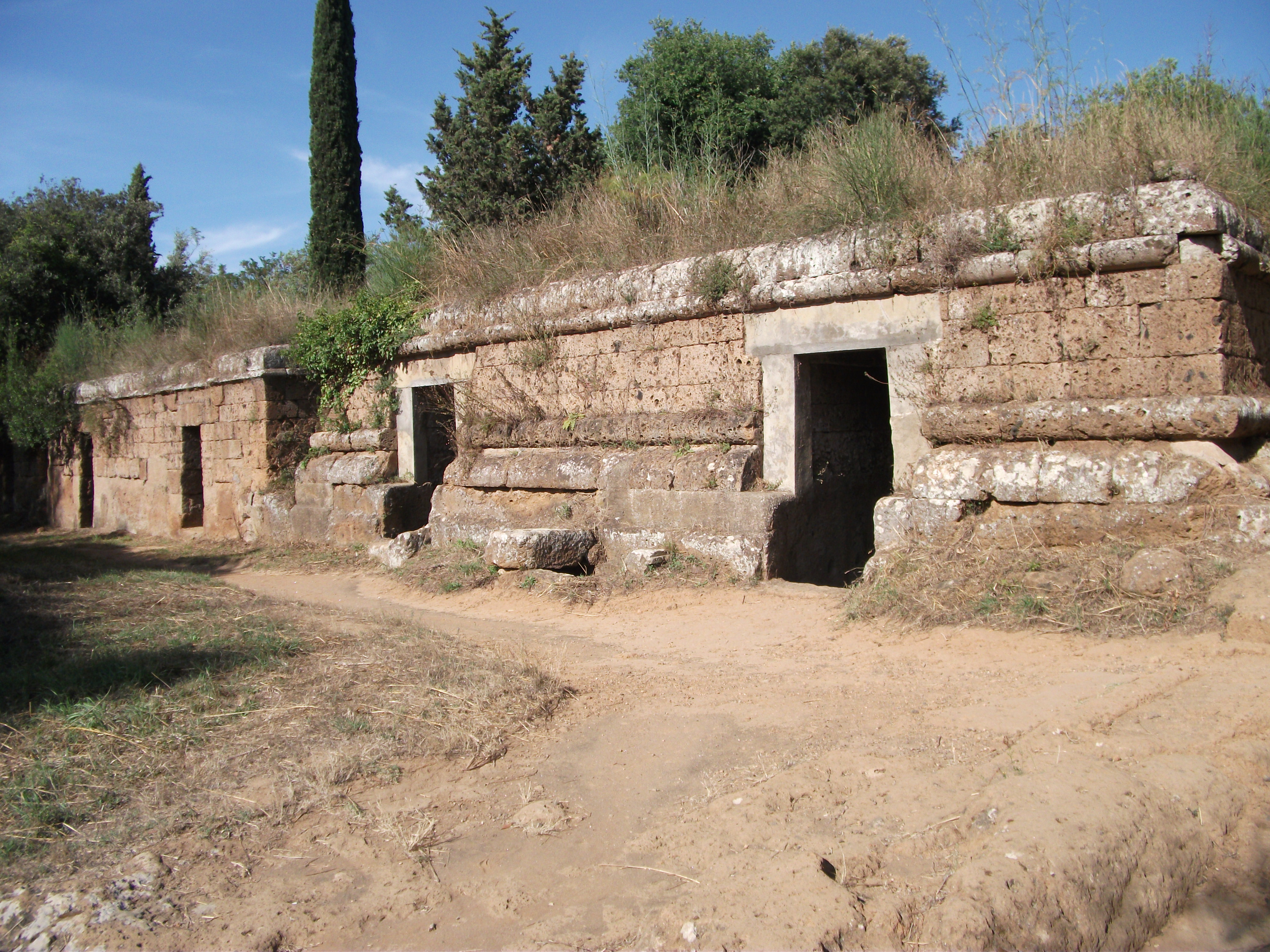
Tumuli are placed along a street in the Banditaccia necropolis of Cerveteri, Italy.

The Etruscans took the concept of a "city of the dead" quite literally. The typical tomb at the Banditaccia necropolis at Cerveteri consists of a tumulus which covers one or more rock-cut subterranean tombs. These tombs had multiple chambers and were elaborately decorated like contemporary houses. The arrangement of the tumuli in a grid of streets gave it an appearance similar to the cities of the living. The art historian Nigel Spivey considers the name cemetery inadequate and argues that only the term necropolis can accurately represent these sophisticated burial sites. Etruscan necropoli were usually located on hills or slopes of hills.

=== Mycenae ===
In the Mycenaean Greek period predating ancient Greece, burials could be performed inside the city. In Mycenae, for example, the royal tombs were located in a precinct within the city walls. This changed during the ancient Greek period when necropolis usually lined the roads outside a city. There existed some degree of variation within the ancient Greek world, however. Sparta was notable for continuing the practice of burial within the city.

The tombs in early Mycenaean Greece were arranged in clusters, and the choice of location wasn’t accidental. Researchers stated that nearby communities selected these burial sites because the bedrock was soft enough to carve but still durable enough to protect the tombs over time. There’s also the possibility that these cemeteries were connected to a system of surrounding settlements, either smaller peripheral towns or a central habitation site that relied on the necropolis as a shared burial ground. As individual tombs filled, space became limited, and older remains were moved outward into small pits or niches cut directly into the bedrock. This practice shows how communities adapted their burial customs over generations while still maintaining continuity in how and where they buried their dead.

A similar relationship between burial practice and social identity appears in other regions of Greece. In the necropolis at Vari, located in southern Attika, burial patterns help trace how communities in peripheral areas developed their rites and expressed social structure during the archaic period. Evidence from Vergina shows that elite identity was communicated through grave goods: male burials often included armor, while female burials featured rich jewelry, each signaling status in different ways. Pottery also played a role, especially vessels tied to drinking and commensality, suggesting that shared consumption remained important in funerary rituals even when it wasn’t used as a major marker of social distinction. Detailed tables and diagrams from the study illustrate how offerings were distributed and how jewelry was placed on the body, giving a clearer picture of how these communities used material culture to shape meaning within their necropolis spaces.

=== Persia ===
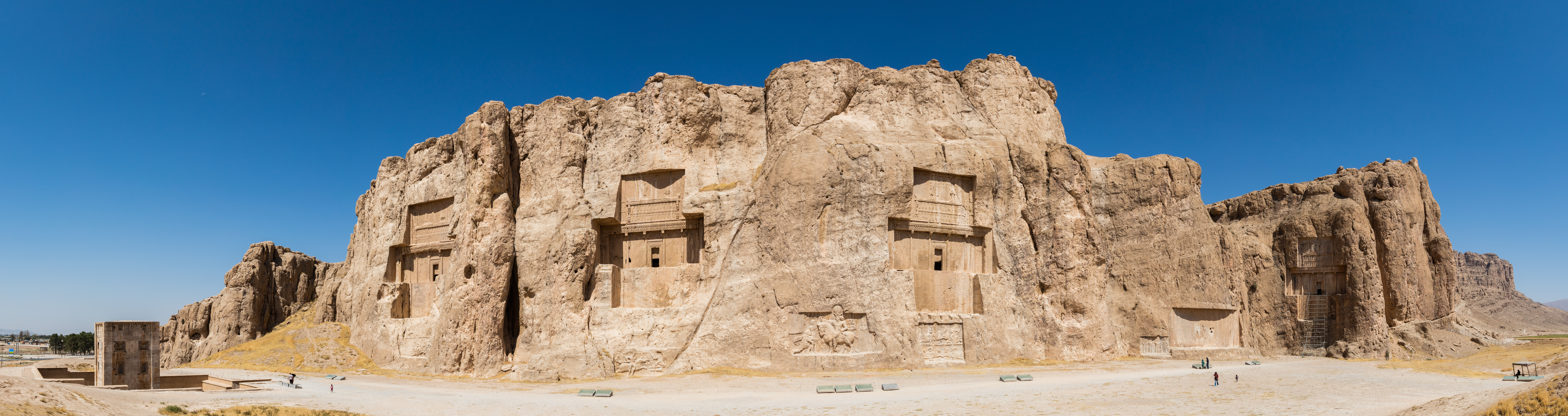
Naqsh-e Rostam. The order of the tombs in Naqshe-e Rustam, from left to right, is: Darius II, Artaxerxes I, Darius I, Xerxes I.

Not far from Persepolis, you can find Naqsh-e Rostam, where Persian kings like Darius I and II, Xerxes, and Artaxerxes are buried in tombs carved into the cliffs.Naqsh-e Rostam is an ancient necropolis located about 12 km (7.5 mi) northwest of Persepolis, in Fars Province, Iran. The oldest relief at Naqsh-i Rustam dates to c. 1000 BC. Though it is severely damaged, it depicts a faint image of a man with unusual headgear and is thought to be Elamite in origin. The depiction is part of a larger image, most of which was removed at the command of Bahram II. Four tombs belonging to Achaemenid kings are carved out of the rock face at a considerable height above the ground. The tombs are known locally as the "Persian crosses", after the shape of the facades of the tombs. Later, Sassanian kings added a series of rock reliefs below the tombs.

=== Lydia ===
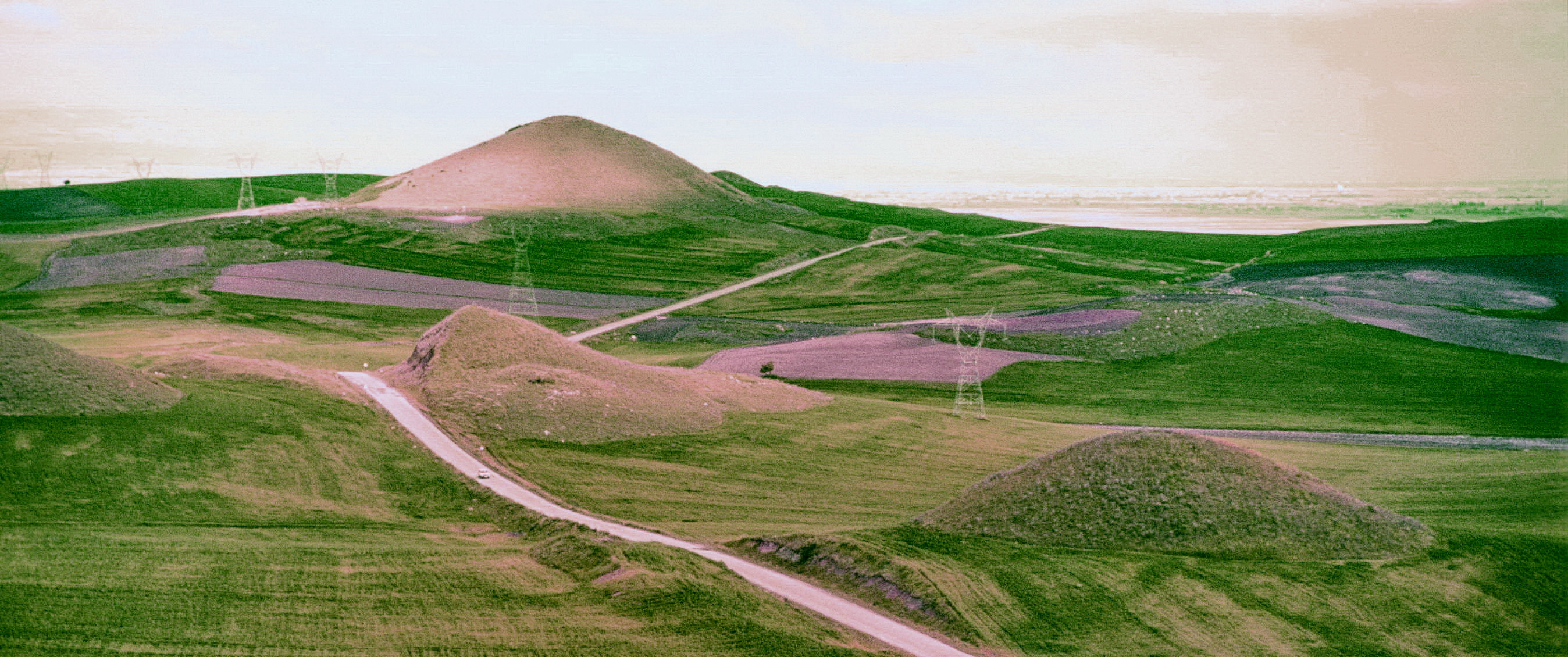
Lydian tumuli at Bin Tepe, the necropolis of Sardis

The site of Bin Tepe served as a necropolis for Sardis, the capital of Lydia. It consists of over 100 tumuli including the monumental Tumulus of Alyattes which was commented on by ancient writers including Herodotus and still marks the landscape today. Though Lydian elites also used other burial styles, tumuli are so numerous throughout Lydia that they are used to track settlement patterns. The style was adopted around 600 BC, likely inspired by similar Phrygian tombs at Gordion. It continued after the Persian conquest of Lydia, into the Hellenistic and Roman eras.

=== Myra ===
Myra is an ancient city in Lycia that has two areas filled with rock-cut tombs. These tombs are carved into the cliffs and look like the fronts of temples. The two burial sites are called the river necropolis and the ocean necropolis. The ocean necropolis is located just northwest of the ancient theater.

=== Rome ===
Due to Roman laws strictly prohibiting burials inside cities, tombs usually lined up along city walls and important roads such as the Appian Way in a manner where they competed for the passersby's attention. Another notable example of a Roman necropolis is Alyscamps, which followed the very end of the Via Aurelia near the entrance of Arles.

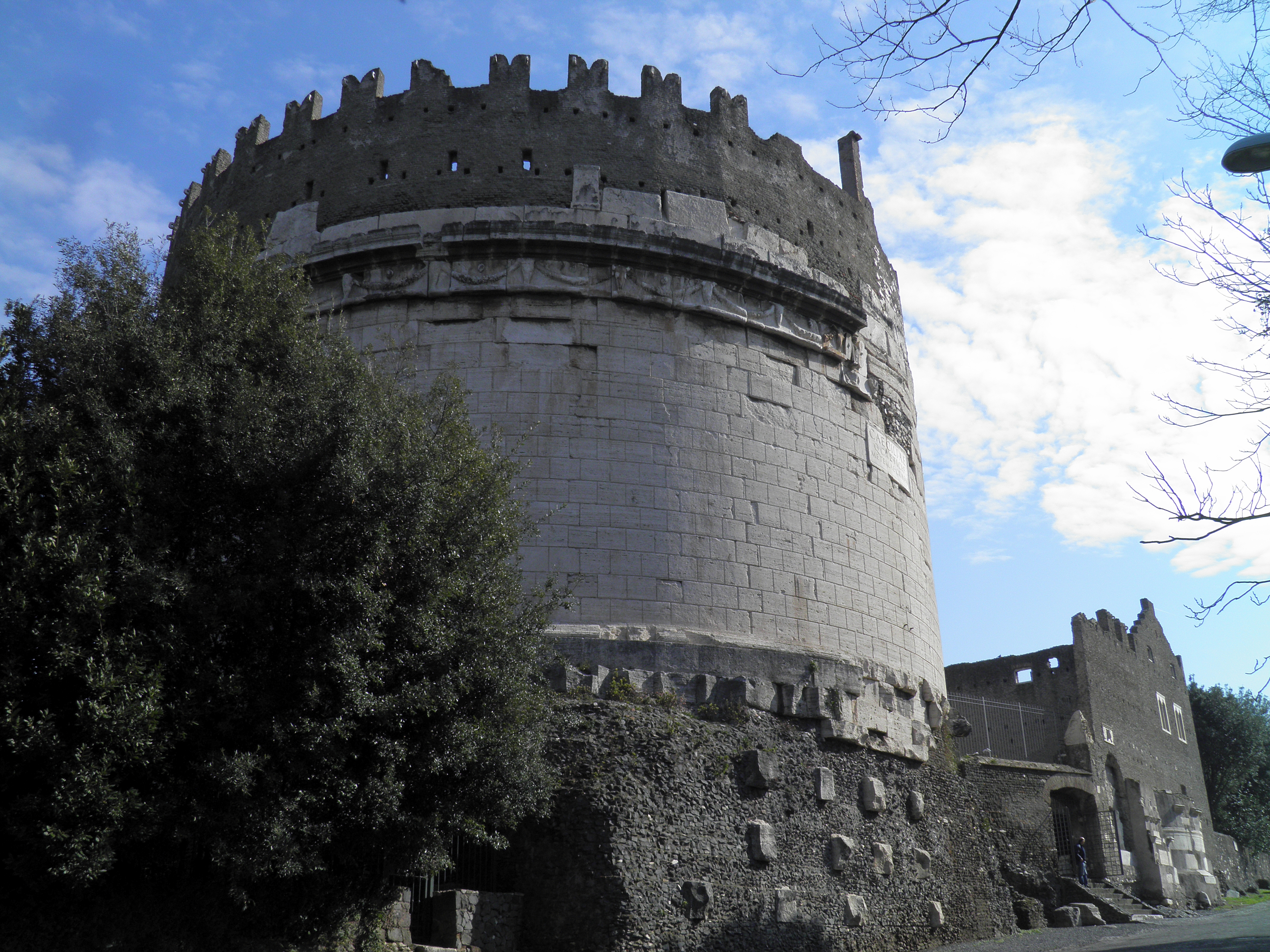
The Mausoleum of Caecilia Metella along the Via Appia

These streets would feature a mix of tombs and mausoleums along its edges, and their size, detailing and proximity to the road largely depended on the wealth of its owner. The aforementioned Appian Way features circular mausoleums such as the Tomb of Caecilia Metella, Casal Rotondo and the Mausoleum of Maxentius built during the late Republic and early Empire for members of the powerful Roman elites.

The 'Vila de Madrid' necropolis is located in Barcelona, Catalonia. The first archaeological digs happened in the 1950s and uncovered many graves along a side road that was part of the Roman city of Barcino's western cemetery.

== Modern necropolises ==
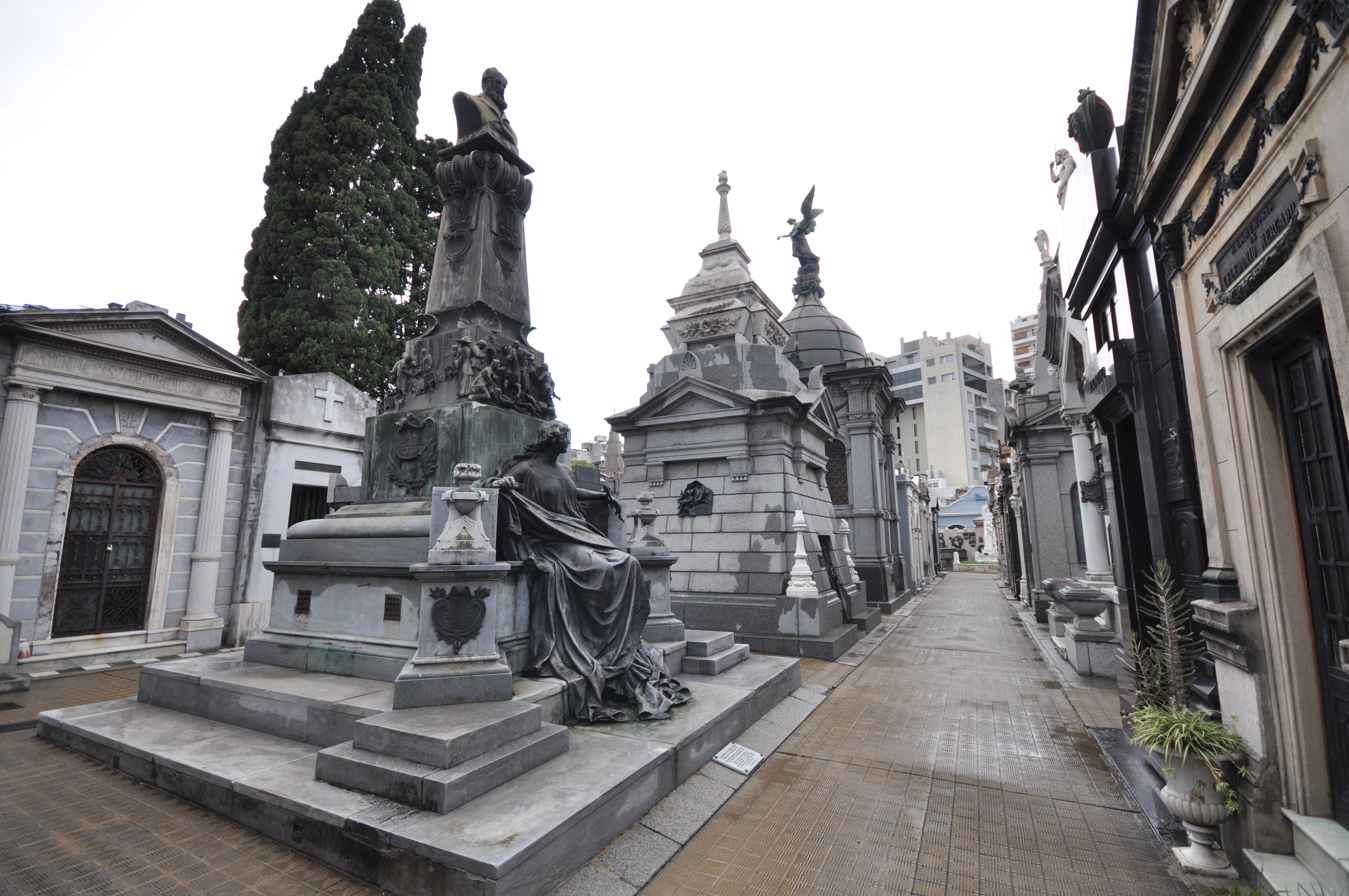
Alley in La Recoleta Cemetery in Buenos Aires, Argentina

In more recent times, some cemeteries are also called necropolises because they look like cities made of above-ground tombs, especially in areas like New Orleans, where the ground is too wet for traditional burials. The world's largest remaining operating necropolis from the Victorian era, for example, is Rookwood Necropolis, in New South Wales, Australia.

A modern era example is Colma, California, United States. Known as the "City of Souls," Colma is a small town with about 1,600 living people but nearly 1.5 million buried in its cemeteries. Covering two square miles, the town is more about graves than homes. Funerals often cause the most traffic, and residents get automated alerts when big funeral processions are on the way.

== See also ==
- List of necropoleis
- Funerary art
- Catacombs
- Necropolis of the Rabs
