= Lake Marmara =

Lake in Turkey

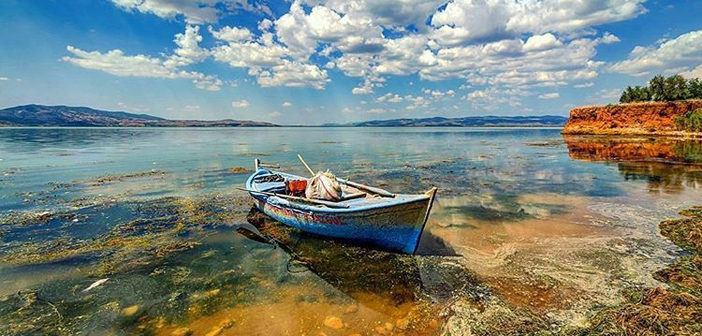
- Lake Marmara

- Location within Turkey
- Location: Aegean Region
- Coordinates: 38.614377°N 27.983474°E
- Basin countries: Turkey
- Surface area: 44.5 km^{2} (17.2 sq mi)
- Surface elevation: 79 m (259 ft)

Lake Marmara (Turkish: Marmara Gölü) is a lake in Manisa Province, western Turkey, bordered by the district areas of Gölmarmara to the northwest, whose name itself is inspired by the lake, and in larger part by Salihli.

Lake Marmara is located in the alluvial valley of the Gediz River and at 79 m (259 ft), is slightly lower than the surrounding plains of the river (91 m (299 ft) for the nearby Gölmarmara town center).

Aside from being a recreational center for the province as a whole, Lake Marmara is also an important source for fishing and agricultural irrigation and an Important Bird Area.

In the early stages of Anatolian history, the lake was famous as a resort center for the Lydians, at a short distance from their capital, and was called under various names throughout history, the most notable being "Lake Gyges" or "Gygaean Lake" and "Lake Coloe" or "Lake Koloe”. Several archaeological sites are located nearby including Sardis, Bin Tepe, and Kaymakçı.

Climate change litigation is ongoing about the lake almost drying up.
