= Colossal Head of Faustina the Elder from Sardis =

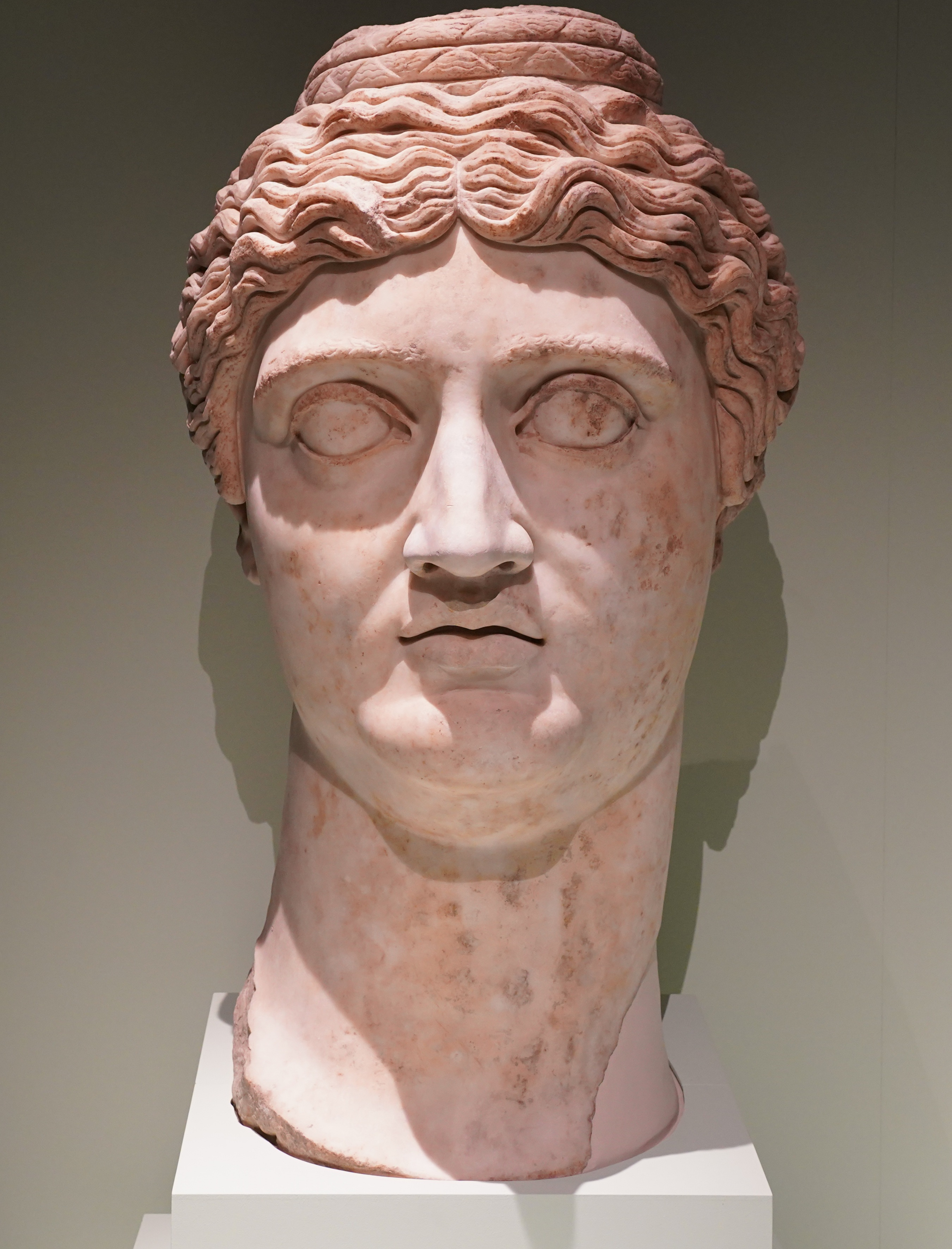
- The head on display at an exhibition
- Material: White marble
- Size: Height: 176 cm Width: 75 cm Depth: 78 cm
- Created: c.140 AD
- Discovered: 1882
- Present location: British Museum, London
- Registration: 1936.0310.1

This huge marble head belonged to a statue in the temple of Artemis in Sardis, in present-day Turkey, that represents Faustina the Elder, wife of the Roman Emperor Antoninus Pius who reigned from 138-161 AD. .

== Provenance ==
The massive sculpture was found in 1882 by George Dennis, then British consul in Smyrna, "just beyond the centre of the naos of the temple of Aetermis in Sardis, lying on about a metre of debris." The temple also housed a statue of the emperor himself, part of which is now in the local museum. Both statues must have been about six meters high. During the reign of Antoninus Pius, Sardis was granted the privilege to gain the status of a provincial center dedicated to the cult of the emperor. The Temple of Artemis thus became the heart of this cult. Now in the British Museum, the image of the head was taken at the Oog in oog met de Romeinen (Eye to Eye with the Romans) Exhibition in the Gallo-Roman Museum of Tongres, Belgium

== Description ==
The head was part of an acrolith marble statue, about three to three and a half times life size. The back of the head is hollow and has a large dowel hole in the centre, flanked by two oblong dowel holes. Two other dowel holes at ear lobe level are broken away. There are drill channels in the hair. The hair and locks on the left side are carved in less detail than those on the right.

== Gallery ==
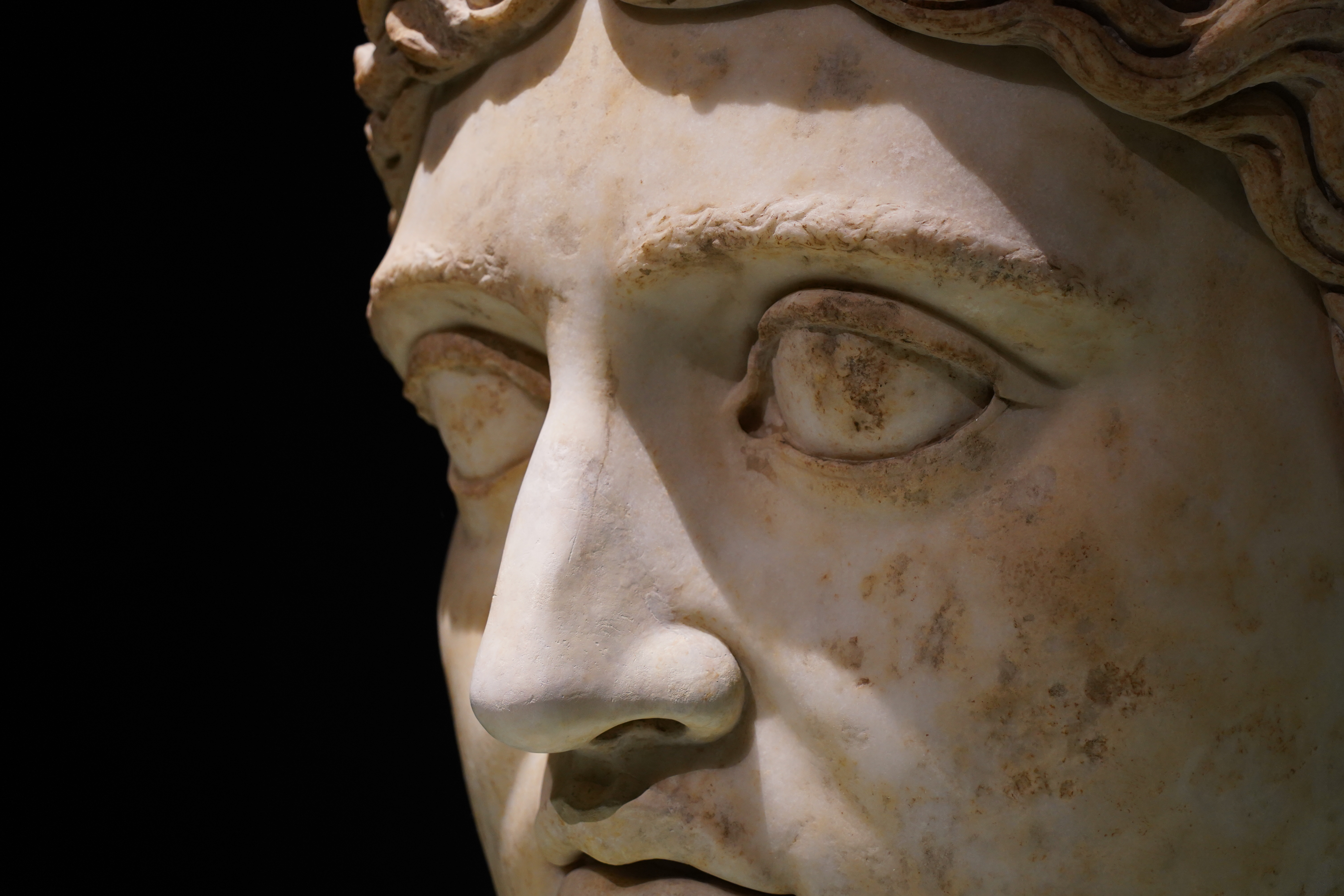
Detail of the face
