= Tasos Athanasiadis =

Greek writer (1913–2006)

Anastasios Athanasiadis
- Born: November 1913; Salihli, Ottoman Empire
- Died: 21 September 2006 (aged 92); Athens, Greece
- Occupations: Novelist, essayist, biographer
- Writing career
- Pen name: Tasos Athanasiadis

Anastasios Athanasiadis (Greek: Τάσος Αθανασιάδης; November 1913 – 21 September 2006) was a writer and academician.

== Biography ==
He studied law in the University of Athens and practiced law in the period 1940–1945. In 1945 he got posted as Manager of the National Theatre of Greece Secretariat, and afterwards as general Manager, a job that he retained until 1972. In 1994 he got nominated as honorary doctor of the School of Philosophy of the University of Athens. Greece honoured him with three National Prizes and the medal of the Order of the Phoenix and he also got honoured with the silver medal of the French Academy. He got famous from his writings The guards of the Achaea (two book novel, Academy of Athens Prize of the Urani Foundation), Pantheoi (trilogy novel in four books, Academy of Athens Prize – 1961), The throne room (National novel Prize – 1969), and The children of Niobe. In 1986 he was elected to the Academy of Athens and serviced as president of the Urani Foundation, of the Palamas Foundation and of the İpekçi Literature Prizes. As a second language he spoke French and he was a resident of Athens.

== Bibliography ==
1. Dostoevsky, from the prison to the passion (National biography prize 1955),
2. Albert Schweitzer (National biography prize 1963),
3. Journey to the Loneliness (chronicle),
4. Three children of our century (biography chronicles),
5. The children of Niobe (novel),
6. The last grandsons (novel),
7. Pantheoi (novel),
8. The guards of the Achaea (novel),
9. The throne room (novel),
10. Anagnoriseis (essays),
11. The Son of the Sun (biography).
