= Sart, Salihli =

Sart
- Neighbourhood
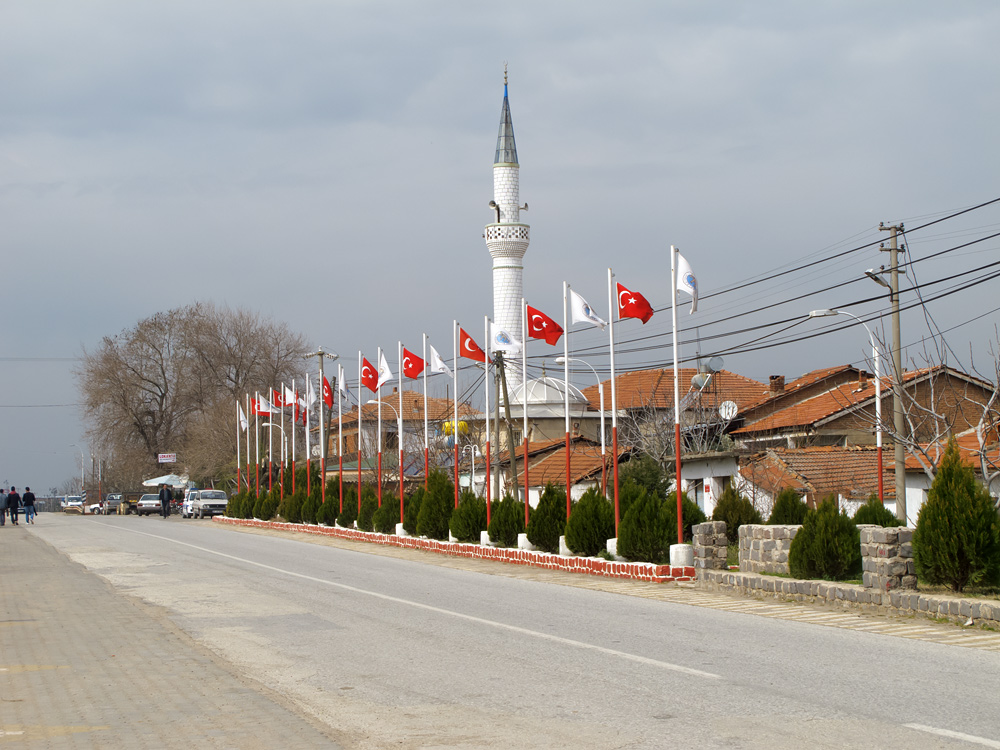

- Location within Turkey Location within Turkey Aegean
- Coordinates: 38°29′51.66″N 28°02′35.74″E
- Country: Turkey
- Province: Manisa
- District: Salihli
- Population (2022): 4,756
- Time zone: UTC+3 (TRT)

Sart is a neighbourhood of the municipality and district of Salihli, Manisa Province, Turkey. Its population is 4,756 (2022). Before the 2013 reorganisation, it was a town (belde). It is the location of ancient Sardis, the capital of Lydia.
