= Kaymakçı (archaeological site) =

Bronze Age archaeological site

- Location within Turkey
- 38.6234°N 27.9313°E
- Part of: Seha River Land (hypothesized)

Site notes
- Excavation dates: 2014-2017
- Archaeologists: Christopher H. Roosevelt

Kaymakçı is a Bronze Age archaeological site overlooking Marmara Lake in Manisa Province, Turkey. Given its size and location, the settlement is considered a leading candidate for the capital city of the Seha River Land.

== Archaeology ==
Occupation at Kaymakçı began in the Middle Bronze Age, and it became a major settlement during the Late Bronze Age. The site was settled continuously from 1700 BC to 1200 BC, contemporary with Troy VI and VIIa. Some occupation continued into the Iron Age, though it was no longer a major urban center. Like other citadels in the area, Kaymakçı shows evidence of having been burned, but it is unknown whether this destruction caused the abandonment of the site or dates from an earlier sacking.

The site covers an area of at least 25 hectares, spanning across 1 kilometer of a bedrock ridge. Its elevation 140 meters over the lake provides a commanding view of the surrounding area. It consists of a 8.6 hectare citadel, a sprawling lower town, as well as a cemetery. The citadel is itself divided by circuit walls into several concentric areas, seeming to reflect a hierarchy of sectors. The densely built inner citadel consists of concentric rising terraces much like those at Late Bronze Age Troy. The outer citadel includes a terrace with pebble streets on a grid-like plan and seems to have been divided into residential neighborhoods on different orientations, where residents engaged in household industry. The western area of the outer citadel consists of open spaces and monumental buildings. The lower town covers an area of at least ten hectares, but its existence is known primarily from surface pottery and its exact boundaries are not currently known.

Pottery finds suggest cultural ties to coastal sites such as Troy and inland sites such as Beycesultan. The city also imported Aegean and Hittite objects, and made local imitations.

== Historical context ==
Kaymakçı was located in the Seha River Land, a Late Bronze Age state known from Hittite texts such as the Manapa-Tarhunta letter. In its early history, Seha was part of Arzawa, a macrokingdom which the Hittite king Mursili II defeated and partitioned. After that time, Seha became a vassal state of the Hittites which served as an important intermediary with the Mycenaean Greeks. Kaymakçı is the leading candidate for the Seha River Land's capital due to its size, complexity, and commanding position.

In the Iron Age, the region became part of Lydia, whose capital of Sardis was located near Kaymakçı. However, the relationship between the Lydians and the Sehans is unknown since current evidence suggests both continuity and disruption.

Kaymakçı is located in an area with numerous Hieroglyphic Luwian inscriptions but it is not known whether this was a primary language of the local population or if it was used merely for official purposes. Evidence of cultural continuity raises the possibility that Lydian speakers were already present in the area during the Bronze Age.

== Excavation ==
The site was discovered in 2001, when the Central Lydia Archaeological Survey examined the area around the Marmara Lake and identified 6 citidels, 5 unfortified lowland sites, and 23 smaller sites. The largest was at Kaymakçı. The site of Kaymakçı was then excavated in four seasons between 2014 and 2017.

== See also ==
- Arzawa
- Cities of the ancient Near East
- Hittite Empire
- Kingdom of Mira
- Manapa-Tarhunta letter
- Sardis
- Troy
