= 1952 Istanbul Football League =

Istanbul Football League
- Season: 1952
- Champions: Beşiktaş (12th title)
- Relegated: None
- Matches played: 56
- Goals scored: 175 (3.13 per match)
- Top goalscorer: Şevket Yorulmaz (17)
- Highest scoring: Fenerbahçe 5–2 Vefa (3 February 1952)

The 1952 Istanbul Football League or 1952 Istanbul Professional Football League was the 42nd season of the league and the first season in the professional era. Beşiktaş won the league for the 12th time.

== Season ==
Pos	Team	Pld	W	D	L	GF	GA	GD	Pts
1	Beşiktaş	14	12	2	0	35	10	+25	26
2	Galatasaray	14	6	7	1	23	9	+14	19
3	Fenerbahçe	14	8	3	3	28	18	+10	19
4	Vefa	14	6	2	6	30	23	+7	14
5	Beykoz	14	6	2	6	18	22	−4	14
6	İstanbulspor	14	4	3	7	16	26	−10	11
7	Kasımpaşa	14	2	1	11	12	33	−21	5
8	Emniyet	14	1	2	11	13	34	−21	4
