= Salihli =

- District and municipality
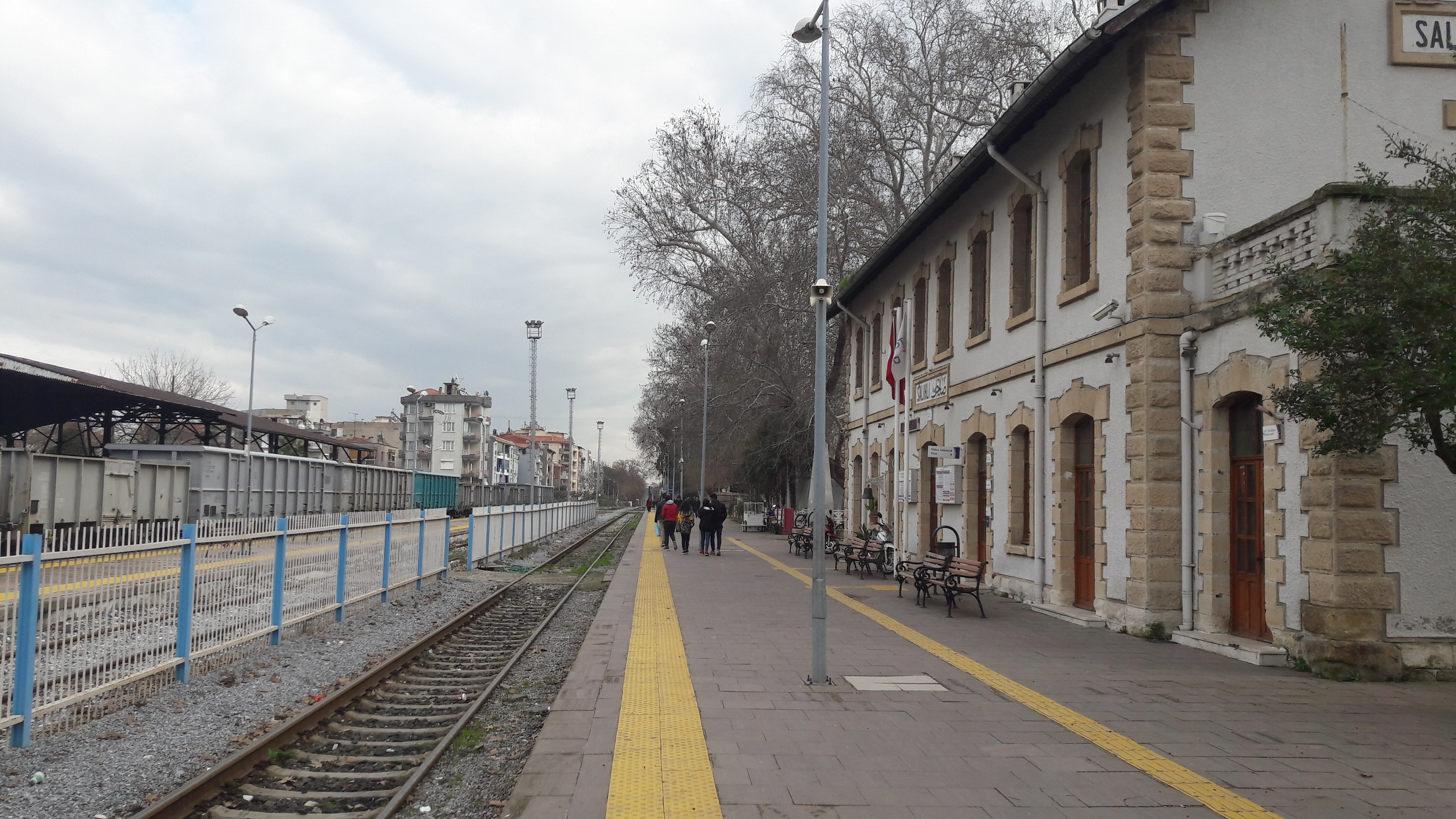
- Salihli railway station

- Logo

- Map showing Salihli District in Manisa Province

- Location within Turkey Location within Turkey Aegean
- Coordinates: 38°28′52″N 28°8′21″E
- Country: Turkey
- Province: Manisa

Government
  - Mayor: Mazlum Nurlu (CHP)
- Area: 1,359 km^{2} (525 sq mi)
- Elevation: 125 m (410 ft)
- Population (2023): 165,182
  - Density: 121.5/km^{2} (314.8/sq mi)
- Time zone: UTC+3 (TRT)
- Area code: 0236
- Website: www.salihli.bel.tr

Salihli is a municipality and district of Manisa Province, Turkey. Its area is 1,359 km^{2}, and its population is 165,182 (2023). The ancient Lydian capitals of Sardes and Daldis are located within Salihli.

== Geography ==
The city of Salihli, which is also the seat of the district, is located on the İzmir-Ankara (E-96) highway, and it's parallel railway connections. The urban centre is situated on the slopes of the Bozdağ mountain chain along the southern alluvial plains of the Gediz River. To the north and northeast of the plain extends two other mountain ranges, Mount Dibek (highest altitude 1120 m) and Mount Üşümüş (highest altitude 1085 m).

The town lies at an altitude of 125 meters from sea level. Its advantageous location, smooth and busy intercity connections and the fertile soil allowed Salihli to develop extremely well in the recent past.

Four rivers, namely Alaşehir, Gümüş, Kurşunlu and Sart cross the district area to join the River Gediz, which flows westward. The climate type is Mediterranean climate. To the 24 km (15 mi) north of the city is Demirköprü Dam, used for irrigation, prevention of overflows, energy production and fishing, and which was built between 1954 and 1960.

The population in the 2000 census were 149,150 for the whole district and 83,137 for the urban center of Salihli. (The urban population is 165,182 as of 2023.)

The district area is surrounded by the neighboring districts of Ahmetli to the west, Gölmarmara to the northwest, Gördes and Köprübaşı to the north, Demirci to the northeast, Kula to the east, Alaşehir to the southeast and Ödemiş to the south.

The distances from Salihli to the seat of neighboring provinces are:

| in km | Manisa | İzmir | Balıkesir | Uşak | Denizli |
| Salihli | 72 | 96 | 144 | 120 | 110 |

The distances from Salihli to other cities of Manisa are:

| in km | Alaşehir | Ahmetli | Akhisar | Demirci | Gölmarmara | Gördes | Kula | Köprübaşı | Saruhanlı | Sarıgöl | Selendi | Turgutlu |
| Salihli | 40 | 18 | 66 | 102 | 40 | 88 | 42 | 53 | 52 | 53 | 80 | 42 |

== History ==
Salihli is a city with a long history. Fossilised footprints discovered near the villages of Sindel and Çarıklar, Manisa are estimated to be between 10,000 and 26,000 years old, and are the first traces of prehistory in the region. However, the region came to foremost importance with the establishment of the city of Sardes, which is located 7 km (4 mi) west of Salihli center and where the most remarkable historical artifacts and remains of the region are found.

Sardes was the capital city of Lydia until 547 B.C., at which date it was captured by the Persian Empire and governed by satraps until 334 B.C.. After the Persians, the region was governed successively by the Macedonian Empire, the Kingdom of the Attalids, Roman Empire and Byzantine Empire. In the beginning of the 14th century, Turks under the Beylik of Saruhan captured the city and the region and ruled it for a century from their base in nearby Manisa. In 1400 the region passed over to the Ottoman Empire under which Manisa preserved its position as a primary regional center. In the beginning of the Ottoman rule, Salihli was a village of the kaza of Sart, depending the province seat of Aydın, situated more to the south, and was called Evlâd-i Salih (meaning 'the children of Salih' in English). In the 19th century, with the construction of İzmir-Uşak-Afyon railway, Salihli demonstrated a much more rapid pace of progress compared to Sart and gained township status in 1872, when it became a kaza of the Sanjak of Saruhan, centred around Manisa. From 1867 until 1922, Salihli was part of the Aidin Vilayet of the Ottoman Empire.

During the Greco-Turkish War, the city was taken by Greek forces on 24 July 1920, then re-taken by the Turkish army on 5 September 1922. According to a number of sources, the retreating Greek army carried out a scorched-earth policy while fleeing from Anatolia during the final phase of the war. According to James Loder Park, the U.S. Vice-Consul in Constantinople at the time, who toured much of the devastated area immediately after the Greek evacuation, 65% of Salihli had been destroyed.

After the war, Salihli became one of the biggest and the most important districts of Manisa. It is not always easy to make estimates on Salihli's population before the establishment of the Republic of Turkey due to the lack of adequate sources. However, a population of 500 people was confirmed for Sart during the 1831 census. The city grew quite fast after the construction of the railway until the Turkish War of Independence. In the yearbook of 1891, 3000 people and in the yearbook of 1908, 4400 people were documented to be living in Salihli. In the first Republican census of 1927, 7191 people were recorded. The departure of the town's minority populations in 1923 also caused the population to decrease.

Salihli has always been an attractive destination for immigrants. In the Ottoman era, the region was a favorite stopover for nomad clans (aşiret). Today, it is still possible to trace the names of some of the region's villages to the original aşiret names such as Karayahşi, Araplı, Burhan, Beylikli, Çökelek, Eldelek, Dombaylı, Durasıllı, Sindel etc. Moreover, some aşiret names refer to unsettled localities, such as Sığıralcısı, Bayındırlı, Karatekeli, Kuşdoğanlı, Kacar, Taras, Karakeçili. After the 1890s until the 1950s, Salihli also attracted many immigrants moving into Turkey from the Balkans, from Yugoslavia and Bulgaria particularly. Many Turkic-speaking immigrants from Xinjiang, China chose to live in Salihli during the Chinese revolutionary disturbances.

This part of the population, mainly Kazakhs and known as Türkistanlılar in the city, came to Salihli between 1954 and 1955 in the following years. After the 1970s, some immigration from Eastern Anatolia also came to strengthen the ranks of the previous immigrants. Counter-movements in the population were towards Turkey's big cities and to Europe, especially to Germany and France).

== Composition ==
There are 103 neighbourhoods in Salihli District:

- Adala
- Akçaköy
- Akören
- Aksoy
- Akyar
- Allahdiyen
- Atatürk
- Bağcılar
- Bahçecik
- Barış
- Başlıoğlu
- Beşeylül
- Beylikli
- Burhanköy
- Caferbey
- Çakaldoğan
- Çaltılı
- Çamurhamamı
- Çapaklı
- Çavlı
- Çayköy
- Çaypınar
- Çelikli
- Çökelek
- Çukuroba
- Cumhuriyet
- Damatlı
- Dedetaşı
- Delibaşlı
- Derbent
- Dombaylı
- Durasıllı
- Eldelek
- Eminbey
- Emirhacılı
- Eskicami
- Gaffar Okkan
- Gaziler
- Gökçeköy
- Gökeyüp
- Gökköy
- Gümüş
- Güneş
- Hacıbektaşlı
- Hacıhıdır
- Hacıköseli
- Hacılı
- Hasalan
- İğdecik
- Kabazlı
- Kale
- Kapancı
- Kaplanköy
- Karaağaç
- Karaoğlanlı
- Karapınar
- Karasavcı
- Karayahşi
- Keli
- Kemerdamları
- Kemerköy
- Kırdamları
- Kırveli
- Kızılavlu
- Kocaçeşme
- Kordon
- Köseali
- Kurttutan
- Kurtuluş
- Mamatlı
- Mersindere
- Mersinli
- Mevlutlu
- Mitatpaşa
- Namıkkemal
- Oraklar
- Ortaköy
- Özyurt
- Pazarköy
- Poyraz
- Poyrazdamları
- Sağlık
- Sarıpınar
- Sart
- Şehitler
- Seyrantepe
- Sindel
- Şirinyer
- Süleymaniye
- Taytan
- Tekelioğlu
- Torunlu
- Üçtepe
- Yağbasan
- Yağmurlar
- Yeniköy
- Yenipazar
- Yeşilkavak
- Yeşilova
- Yeşilyurt
- Yılmaz
- Yörük
- Zafer

== Climate ==
Climate data for Salihli (1991–2020)
| Month | Jan | Feb | Mar | Apr | May | Jun | Jul | Aug | Sep | Oct | Nov | Dec | Year |
|---|---|---|---|---|---|---|---|---|---|---|---|---|---|
| Mean daily maximum °C (°F) | 11.4 (52.5) | 13.3 (55.9) | 17.2 (63.0) | 22.2 (72.0) | 28.1 (82.6) | 33.1 (91.6) | 35.9 (96.6) | 35.9 (96.6) | 31.3 (88.3) | 25.0 (77.0) | 18.3 (64.9) | 12.8 (55.0) | 23.7 (74.7) |
| Daily mean °C (°F) | 6.3 (43.3) | 7.9 (46.2) | 10.9 (51.6) | 15.3 (59.5) | 20.7 (69.3) | 25.4 (77.7) | 28.0 (82.4) | 27.7 (81.9) | 23.4 (74.1) | 17.9 (64.2) | 11.9 (53.4) | 7.8 (46.0) | 17.0 (62.6) |
| Mean daily minimum °C (°F) | 2.4 (36.3) | 3.5 (38.3) | 5.6 (42.1) | 9.2 (48.6) | 13.9 (57.0) | 18.1 (64.6) | 20.4 (68.7) | 20.4 (68.7) | 16.1 (61.0) | 11.8 (53.2) | 6.9 (44.4) | 3.9 (39.0) | 11.1 (52.0) |
| Average precipitation mm (inches) | 71.69 (2.82) | 66.26 (2.61) | 54.69 (2.15) | 46.23 (1.82) | 36.51 (1.44) | 18.73 (0.74) | 8.75 (0.34) | 6.97 (0.27) | 17.98 (0.71) | 30.77 (1.21) | 58.1 (2.29) | 69.96 (2.75) | 486.64 (19.16) |
| Average precipitation days (≥ 1.0 mm) | 7.7 | 7.1 | 7.6 | 6 | 5.4 | 3.3 | 1.8 | 1.5 | 2.7 | 3.9 | 5.6 | 8.4 | 61 |
| Average relative humidity (%) | 74.7 | 70.1 | 65.1 | 60.6 | 55.2 | 49.8 | 48.4 | 51.4 | 54.6 | 63.4 | 70.4 | 76.1 | 61.7 |
Source: NOAA

== Economy ==
The economy of the city is primarily based around agriculture, agricultural commerce and industry.

Agriculture:

The main agricultural products are seedless sultana grapes, wheat, barley, cotton, tobacco and maize. The fertility of the region's soil also allows for the cultivation of a wide variety of fruits and vegetables. Cherries known as the Napoleon breed grown especially in the villages of Allahdiyen and Gökköy and the potatoes locally known as Bozdağ potatoes are particularly famous.

Stockbreeding is another source of income for rural inhabitants, of rising importance especially in the last decade.

Industry:

The recent building of Salihli Organized Industrial Zone (in Turkish Salihli Organize Sanayi Bölgesi), extending over an area of 111 hectares in a triangular zone between the close district centers of Salihli, Alaşehir and Kula, became a great opportunity to provide new employment opportunities in the region and accelerate the pace of industrialization.

Smaller industrial enterprises are concentrated in Salihli itself, where there are 32 brickworks and tileries drawing on the region's rich reserves in raw materials for bricks, two flour mills, two valonia oak factories, ten cotton gin factories, two grape operating works, one feed grain factory, one industrial tube factory, one tomato dressing factory, two olive oil mills, two beverage factories, one water bottling factory, one mineral water company and one emery rock factory.

Tourism:

The remains of Sardis, which notably includes the Lydian King named Giges's tomb, the Artemis Temple and a Marble Court with Gymnasium built by the Romans, as well as other historical vestiges are widely visited by tourists, nationally and internationally.

5 km (3.1 mi) and 14 km (9 mi) south of the town, there are lead and mud baths named Kurşunlu Kaplıcaları, which are famous across the region. These thermal springs are visited especially to treat rheumatic disorders, sciatica, lumbago, arthritis, neuralgia, orthopaedic disorders, several skin diseases, some gynecological conditions and kidney disorders. Moreover, a recent geothermal energy production project intends to use these thermal sources and provide heating for the city of Salihli.

There are also many excursion possibilities around Salihli. Bozdağ summits and the Lake Gölcük located near the top of one of the summits is at a very high altitude. The restaurants and cafes situated on the hills around Bozdağ have views over Salihli.

== Culture and sports activities ==
Sporting activities are quite prominent, and the city was represented for a long time in the Turkish Second League by Yeni Salihlispor. Today, nearly 1500 licensed athletes compete in various sports activities in Salihli, such as football, basketball, volleyball, table tennis, judo, wrestling, oil wrestling, folk dance and chess. There are ten football clubs that represent Salihli in Turkey's amateur league, and one female volleyball club in the 2nd league. Under Salihli Municipality's structure, Turkish folk music, Turkish classical music and children's chorus organizations also have a place, and modern ballet and other dance schools, folk dancing, piano, drawing and theater lessons are also supported. The judo team has previously won gold, silver and bronze medals in world championships and many other medals in national tournaments.

== Cuisine ==
Besides other Turkish dishes, Salihli has a particular köfte variety of its own, named Odun Köfte. Gökeyüp village's güveç stews are also particularly famous in the region. The production of high-quality grapes, especially sultana grapes, is also reflected in the cuisine. In wedding ceremonies held in the villages, dishes like keşkek and topalak are often cooked, and some people make their own rakı with sweet sultana grapes.

== Notable people ==
- Tasos Athanasiadis (1913-2006), Greek writer
- Güven Erkaya (1938-2000), Turkish admiral
- Ramiz Turan, military officer, died during Cyprus Operation
- Ali İhsan Karayiğit (1928-2014), Football player
- Ali Tandoğan, ex-football player, manager
