= 1922–23 Galatasaray S.K. season =

Galatasaray
1922–23 season
- President: Refik Cevdet Kalpakçıoğlu (until 10 December 1922); Yusuf Ziya Öniş
- Manager: Adil Giray
- Stadium: Taksim Stadı
- Istanbul Lig: 3rd
| Home colours | Away colours |

The 1922–23 season was Galatasaray SK's 19th in existence and the club's 13th consecutive season in the Istanbul Football League.

== Squad statistics ==
| No. | Pos. | Name | IFL | | Total | |
| No. | Pos. | Name | Apps | Goals | Apps | Goals |
|---|---|---|---|---|---|---|
| - | GK | (Turkey) Nüzhet Abbas Öniş | 5 | 0 | 5 | 0 |
| - | GK | (Turkey) Adil Giray (C) | 2 | 0 | 2 | 0 |
| - | DF | (Turkey) Ali Gencay | 4 | 0 | 4 | 0 |
| - | DF | (Turkey) Şinazi Özdemir | 4 | 0 | 4 | 0 |
| - | DF | (Turkey) Mehmet Nazif Gerçin | 2 | 0 | 2 | 0 |
| - | DF | (Turkey) Hayri Cemil Gönen | 2 | 0 | 2 | 0 |
| - | MF | (Turkey) Suat Subay | 4 | 0 | 4 | 0 |
| - | MF | (Turkey) Edip Ossa | 4 | 0 | 4 | 0 |
| - | MF | (Turkey) Nihat Bekdik | 7 | 0 | 7 | 0 |
| - | MF | (Turkey) Arif Soydan | 5 | 0 | 5 | 0 |
| - | MF | (Turkey) Necip Şahin Erson | 4 | 0 | 4 | 0 |
| - | FW | (Turkey) Muslihiddin Peykoğlu | 5 | 0 | 5 | 0 |
| - | FW | (Turkey) Kemal Nejat Kavur | 3 | 0 | 3 | 0 |
| - | FW | (Turkey) Mehmet Leblebi | 1 | 0 | 1 | 0 |
| - | FW | (Turkey) Rüştü | 3 | 0 | 3 | 0 |
| - | FW | (Turkey) Ilhami | 1 | 0 | 1 | 0 |
| - | FW | (Turkey) Sadi Kurt | 0 | 0 | 0 | 0 |
| - | FW | (Turkey) Ali Teoman | 5 | 0 | 5 | 0 |
| - | FW | (Turkey) Ömer Besim Koşalay | 1 | 0 | 1 | 0 |
| - | FW | (Turkey) Selahattin Sadıkoğlu | 4 | 0 | 4 | 0 |
| - | FW | (Turkey) Fazıl Köprülü | 3 | 0 | 3 | 0 |

== Competitions ==
=== Istanbul Football League ===
==== Standings ====
| Pos | Team | Pld | W | D | L | GF | GA | GD | Pts |
|---|---|---|---|---|---|---|---|---|---|
| 1 | Fenerbahçe SK | 12 | 11 | 1 | 0 | 58 | 0 | +58 | 23 |
| 2 | Altınordu İdman Yurdu SK | 10 | 8 | 1 | 1 | 17 | 1 | +16 | 17 |
| 3 | Galatasaray SK | 10 | 4 | 1 | 5 | 12 | 16 | −4 | 9 |
| 4 | Küçükçekmece SK | 9 | 4 | 0 | 5 | 9 | 30 | −21 | 8 |
| 5 | Hilal SK | 11 | 2 | 4 | 5 | 11 | 23 | −12 | 8 |
| 6 | Üsküdar Anadolu SK | 11 | 2 | 3 | 6 | 8 | 18 | −10 | 7 |
| 7 | Vefa SK | 11 | 3 | 1 | 7 | 6 | 27 | −21 | 7 |
| 8 | Darüşşafaka SK | 10 | 1 | 3 | 6 | 7 | 14 | −7 | 5 |

==== Matches ====
Kick-off listed in local time (EEST)

| 17 November 1922 | Fenerbahçe SK | 3–0 | Galatasaray SK | Istanbul |
| | Zeki Rıza (?); Mehmet Nazif (?); Galip (?) | | | Stadium: Taksim Stadi |

| 9 March 1923 | Galatasaray SK | 0–4 | Fenerbahçe SK | Istanbul |
| | | | Sabih 25'; Ömer 32'; Zeki Rıza 41'; Alaeddin 80' | Stadium: Taksim Stadi |

| Galatasaray SK | 1–3 | Altınordu İdman Yurdu SK | Istanbul |
| | | | Stadium: Taksim Stadi |

| Galatasaray SK | 1–1 | Hilal SK | Istanbul |
| | | | Stadium: Taksim Stadi |

| Galatasaray SK | 1–0 | Üsküdar Anadolu SK | Istanbul |
| | | | Stadium: Taksim Stadi |

| Galatasaray SK | 3–1 | Vefa SK | Istanbul |
| | | | Stadium: Taksim Stadi |

| Galatasaray SK | 3–0 | Küçükçekmece SK | Istanbul |
| | | | Stadium: Taksim Stadi |

=== Friendly matches ===
| 12 January 1923 1 | Galatasaray SK | 1–1 | British Revenge | Istanbul |
| | | | | Stadium: Taksim Stadium |

| 26 January 1923 2 | Galatasaray SK | 5–1 | British Malaya | Istanbul |
| | | | | Stadium: Taksim Stadium |

| 16 February 1923 3 | Galatasaray SK | 2–4 | British Goldstream | Istanbul |
| | | | | Stadium: Taksim Stadium |

| 1 April 1923 4 | Galatasaray SK | 0–0 | British United | Istanbul |
| | | | | Stadium: Taksim Stadium |

| 22 April 1923 5 | Galatasaray SK | 0–0 | British Artilleries | Istanbul |
| | | | | Stadium: Taksim Stadium |

| 27 April 1923 6 | Galatasaray SK | 0–1 | British Royal Sovereign | Istanbul |
| | | | | Stadium: Taksim Stadium |

| 17 May 1923 7 | Galatasaray SK | 2–1 | British Navy | Istanbul |
| | | | | Stadium: Taksim Stadium |

| 1 July 1923 8 | Galatasaray SK | 1–3 | British Gard'ler | Istanbul |
| | | | | Stadium: Taksim Stadium |

| 26 August 1923 9 | Galatasaray SK | 1–2 | British Royal Army | Istanbul |
| | | | | Stadium: Taksim Stadium |

| 14 October 1923 10 | Galatasaray SK | 1–1 | British Comos | Istanbul |
| | | | | Stadium: Taksim Stadium |
