= Fenerbahçe S.K. (football) =

Turkish association football club

Fenerbahçe
- Full name: Fenerbahçe Spor Kulübü (as an association); Fenerbahçe Futbol A.Ş. (Note: While Fenerbahçe Spor Kulübü operates as an association, its football department is managed by Fenerbahçe Futbol A.Ş. as a company) (as a company)
- Nicknames: Sarı-Lacivertliler (The Yellow-Navy Blues); Sarı Kanaryalar (The Yellow Canaries); Efsane (The Legend); Cumhuriyet (The Republic)
- Short name: FB; Fener
- Founded: 3 May 1907; 119 years ago (as Phener-Bagtche Association Football Club) (Note: Although it is known that the club was founded in the spring of 1907, the day and month are unknown. The founding date is traditionally regarded as 3 May in honor of Republic of Turkey's founder Mustafa Kemal Atatürk's date of visit of the club in 1918.)
- Stadium: Şükrü Saracoğlu Stadium
- Capacity: 47,911
- Coordinates: 40°59′16″N 29°02′13″E
- Owner(s): Fenerbahçe S.K. (62.27%); Public (37.73%)
- President: Aziz Yıldırım
- Head coach: Emre Belözoğlu
- League: Süper Lig
- 2025–26: Süper Lig, 2nd of 18
- Website: www.fenerbahce.org
Home colours	Away colours	Third colours

Fenerbahçe Spor Kulübü (Turkish pronunciation: [feˈnæɾbahtʃe spoɾ kuˈlyby], Fenerbahçe Sports Club), simply known as Fenerbahçe or Fener, is the football branch of the Fenerbahçe Sports Club organisation. Based in Istanbul, the team compete in the Süper Lig, the top division of Turkish football. Founded in 1907, Fenerbahçe is one of Turkey's most successful and widely supported clubs, boasting a record 28 Turkish national championship titles, including victories (Note: In the pre-1959 season) in the National Division (six times), Turkish Football Championship (three times) and the Süper Lig (19 times) era, of which only 19 league championship titles are counted by the Turkish Football Federation for the awarding of the championship star. The club has also won 10 Turkish Super Cups and 7 Turkish Cups, making them one of the most decorated teams in Turkish football history. Their home matches have been played at the Şükrü Saracoğlu Stadium in the Kadıköy district of Istanbul since 1908.

Fenerbahçe won its first major honour in domestic football in the early 20th century and continued to become champion in Turkish football before the establishment of the Süper Lig in 1959. Prior to this, the club won multiple Turkish Football Championship titles, asserting its place as one of Turkey's footballing powerhouses. Since the creation of the Süper Lig, Fenerbahçe has remained one of the most successful teams, regularly contending for the title and winning numerous league championships. Counting since the official football federation of the country, the Turkish Football Federation, abbreviated TFF, Fenerbahçe have won 28 national championship titles respectively, making it the most successful so far in Turkey. The club holds the joint-record for the longest uninterrupted top-flight streak in Turkish football history. Internationally, Fenerbahçe won the Balkans Cup in 1966–67, becoming the first Turkish club to claim an international trophy. In modern European competitions, they reached the quarter-finals of the UEFA Champions League in the 2007–08 season and the semi-finals of the UEFA Europa League in 2012–13, further establishing their presence on the continental stage.

Fenerbahçe is also one of the most widely supported football clubs in Turkey, with millions of fans both domestically and internationally. Traditionally, the club plays in striped jerseys with yellow-navy blue color combinations in all branches, especially football. The club has a massive social media following and maintains a dedicated supporter base known for its passionate atmosphere, especially in home matches at Şükrü Saracoğlu Stadium (also known as Chobani Stadium for sponsorship purposes). Alongside Galatasaray and Beşiktaş, Fenerbahçe is part of the "Big Three" clubs of Turkish football, with intense rivalries between these teams shaping the landscape of the Süper Lig.

The club holds a Guinness World Record for having the highest number of medals and trophies across all its sports branches, with a total of 1134 cups and medals. Financially, Fenerbahçe remains one of the wealthiest clubs in Turkey, generating significant revenue from sponsorship deals, broadcasting rights, and commercial ventures. The club continues to invest in youth development and modern facilities, with aspirations to maintain domestic dominance and achieve further success in European competitions. As of 2025, they lead the UEFA coefficient among Turkish teams.

== History ==
=== Established (1906) ===
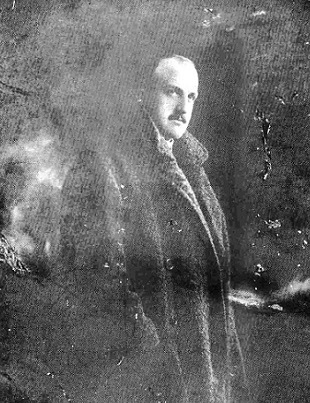
Ziya Songülen, the founder and first president of the club

The founder and first president of Fenerbahçe, Nurizade Ziya Songülen, was first introduced to football in England, where he went for higher education after graduating from Istanbul Saint-Joseph College in 1903, and was inspired by the football teams in this country, where the sport of football was born. When he returned to the country in 1906, the first thing he did was to establish a football team in his hometown, Istanbul in June 1906. He first contacted his friends in the Kadıköy district and then Enver Yetiker, the literature teacher at the school he graduated from, and conveyed his intention to establish a football team to them and made them an offer. Nurizade Ziya Bey, who received a positive response to his offer, initially only went to training with the first Fenerbahçe football team in history, the prototype of which was created in June 1906. Because the team could only be completed as an 11-person team in the spring of 1907, the official foundation date of the club.

"We were from Moda. However, since there was already a club named Moda FC, we naturally couldn't name our team the same. While thinking about what the name of the club we were going to establish should be, we suddenly saw the Fenerbahçe Cape and its lighthouse through the window of our house. At that very moment, we jointly decided to name the club 'Fenerbahçe Football Club'. Our emblem became the 'light-emitting lighthouse''

— Necip Okaner

=== Pre-Süper Lig (1907–1959) ===
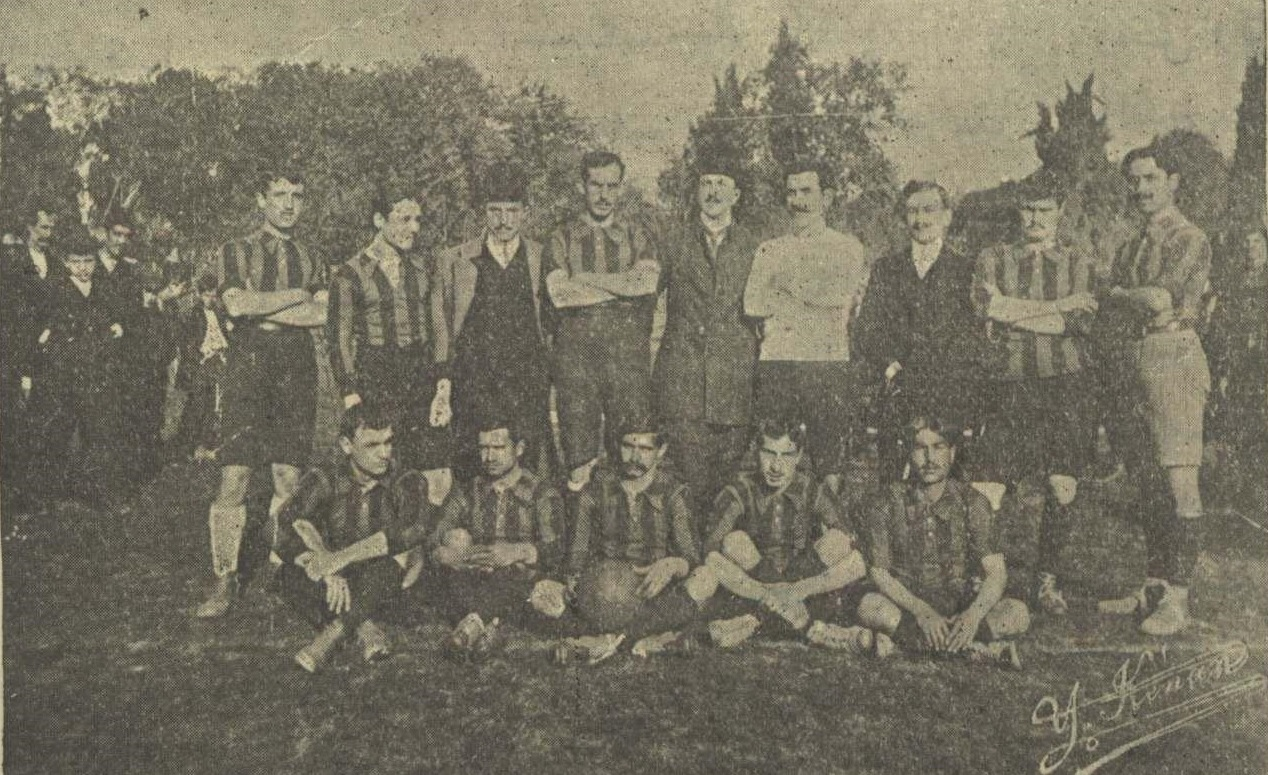
The first team in 1907–08 season (The founder of the club Ziya Songülen, is fourth from the left standing)

Fenerbahçe were officially founded in 3 May 1907 in Kadıköy, Istanbul, by local men Ziya Songülen, Ayetullah Bey and Necip Okaner. This group founded the club secretly in order to keep a low profile and not get into any trouble with the strict Ottoman rule, so strict that the Sultan Abdul Hamid II forbade the Turkish youth to set up a club or engage in the game of football played by the English families that was watched in envy. The three men came together and concluded that Kadıköy was in desperate need of its own football club, where locals would get a chance to practise the game of football. Ziya Songülen was elected the first president of the club, Ayetullah Bey became the first general secretary and Necip Okaner was given the post of general captain. The lighthouse situated on the Fenerbahçe cape was a big influence on the design of the club's first crest, which sported the yellow and white colors of daffodils around the lighthouse. The kits were also designed with yellow and white stripes. Founded by Ottoman Greeks, Strugglers F.C. played against Fenerbahçe in the final match of the tournament it organized in its name on 5 June 1910, and Fenerbahçe won the match 3–1, winning the first cup in its history. The crest of the club was changed in 1914 when Hikmet Topuzer redesigned the badge after Ziya Songülen had changed the colors to yellow and navy in the fall of 1908, still seen today. Fenerbahçe's activities were kept in secrecy until a legislation reform in 1908, when, under a new law, all football clubs had to register to exist legally.

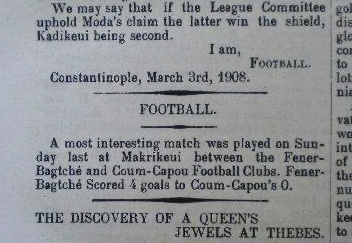
Newspaper news about a match played by Fenerbahçe in the regional tournament on 1 March 1908

The founding line-up included Ziya Songülen, Ayetullah Bey, Necip Okaner, Galip Kulaksızoğlu, Hassan Sami Kocamemi, Asaf Beşpınar, Enver Yetiker, Şevkati Hulusi Bey, Tevfik Taşçı, Hüseyin Dalaklı, Çerkes Sabri, Mazhar Bey and Nasuhi Baydar. Struggling with financial difficulties, Fenerbahçe joined the Istanbul Football League in 1908, finishing fifth in their first year. The first coach of the Fenerbahçe football team was Enver Yetiker, a Literature teacher at Kadıköy Lycée Saint-Joseph, who also helped in the establishment of the club. Fenerbahçe won the 1911–12 season of the Istanbul Football League without losing. This championship was the club's first success in their long history. In the 1913–14 and 1914–15 seasons, the team under the coaching of Galip Kulaksızoğlu won the Istanbul Football League. Fenerbahçe gained the sympathy of some members of the Ottoman Dynasty, especially the princes, after the successful results it achieved in the early years of its establishment. For example, General Osman Fuad, the grandson of Sultan Murad V, served as the honorary president of the club between 1911 and 1913, and Prince Ömer Faruk, the son of the last Ottoman Caliph, Abdulmecid II, became the president of Fenerbahçe until 1924, when the abolition of the Ottoman sultanate. Fenerbahçe finished the seasons 1920–21 and 1922–23 as champions in the Istanbul Friday League. Fenerbahçe completed the season with a score of 58–0 without losing or conceding goals in the season of 1922–23.

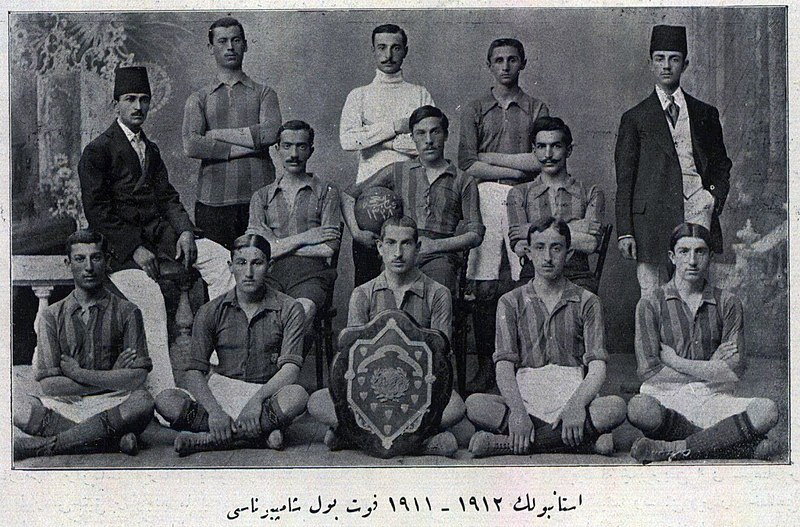
The squad that achieved the team's first League championship (1911–12)

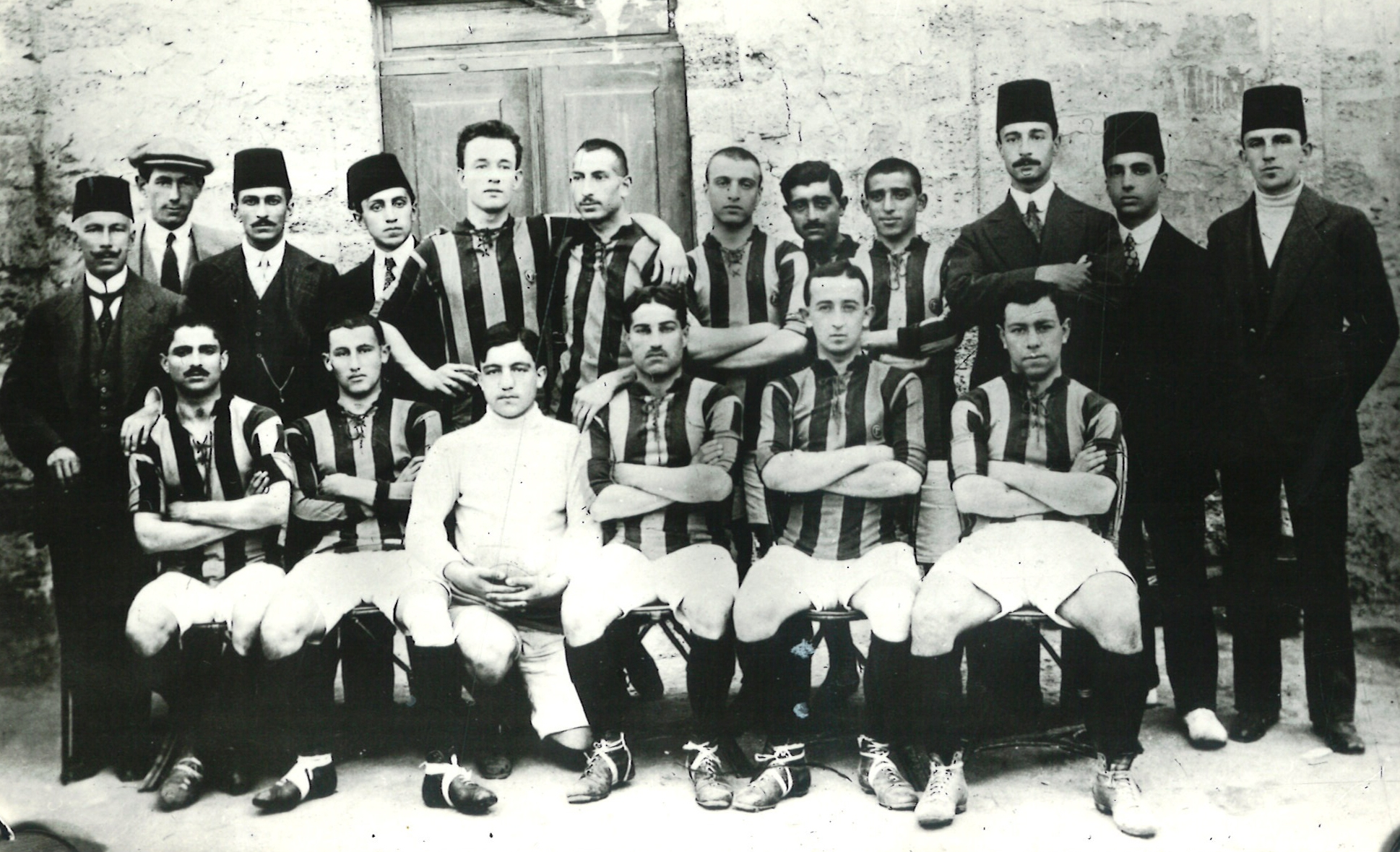
Pre-match photo of Fenerbahçe squad participating in the tournament in Odesa and Mykolaiv upon invitation of the Russian Empire’s football teams (1913)

Fenerbahçe played against the staff of the Royal Navy that occupied Istanbul during the Turkish War of Independence. Some British soldiers formed football teams that were named after the players' speciality, for example Essex Engineers, Irish Guards, Grenadiers and Artillery. These teams played against each other and against local football teams in Istanbul. Fenerbahçe won many of these matches. The most known match played against the British was the match that would determine the winner of the General Harrington Cup. Fenerbahçe won the match held on 29 June 1923 at Taksim Stadium with two goals scored by Zeki Rıza Sporel, one of the important players of the period.

In addition, the founder of Modern Turkey, Mustafa Kemal Atatürk, was a sympathizer of Fenerbahçe. A few months before his appointment as the commander of the Yıldırım Army Group in the Sinai and Palestine campaign (WWI), he visited the Fenerbahçe club's headquarters in Kadıköy, Istanbul, on 3 May 1918.

I had heard about the works and efforts of Fenerbahçe Club which were appreciated and admired everywhere and i saw it as my duty to visit this club and congratulate those who contributed and helped in these works. I could only fulfill this duty today. I am proud to record my lines of appreciation and congratulations here

— Army commander Mustafa Kemal (3 May 1918)

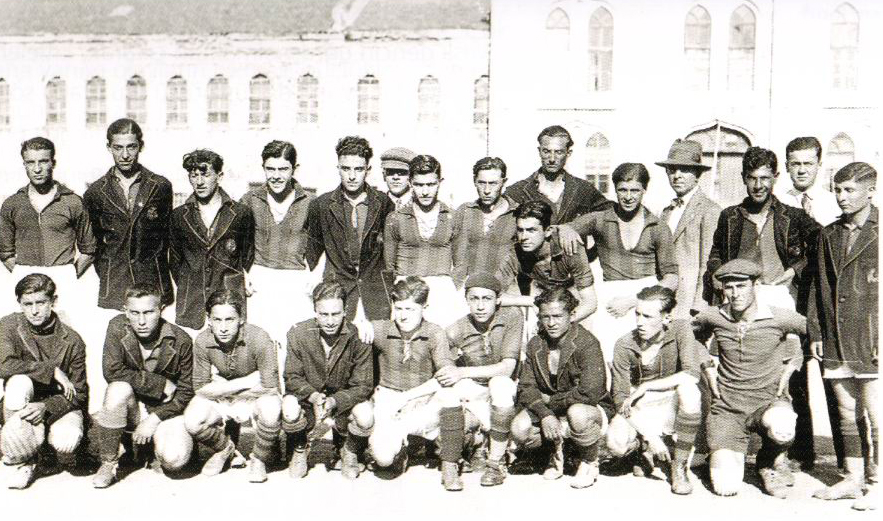
Fenerbahçe and Galatasaray in 1924

Fenerbahçe won the championship 6 times in 1937, 1940, 1943, 1945, 1946 and 1950, and became the team that achieved the most victories in the Turkish National Division. Lefter Küçükandonyadis, one of the important names of Fenerbahçe, scored 423 goals in 615 matches between 1947–1951 and 1953–64. Fenerbahçe won the Istanbul Football League 16 times, the Turkish National Division 6 times, and the former Turkish Football Championship 3 times, all of them records, profiling themselves as forerunners and dominating side in Turkish football before the introduction of the professional nationwide league in 1959.

=== 1960s to 1980s ===
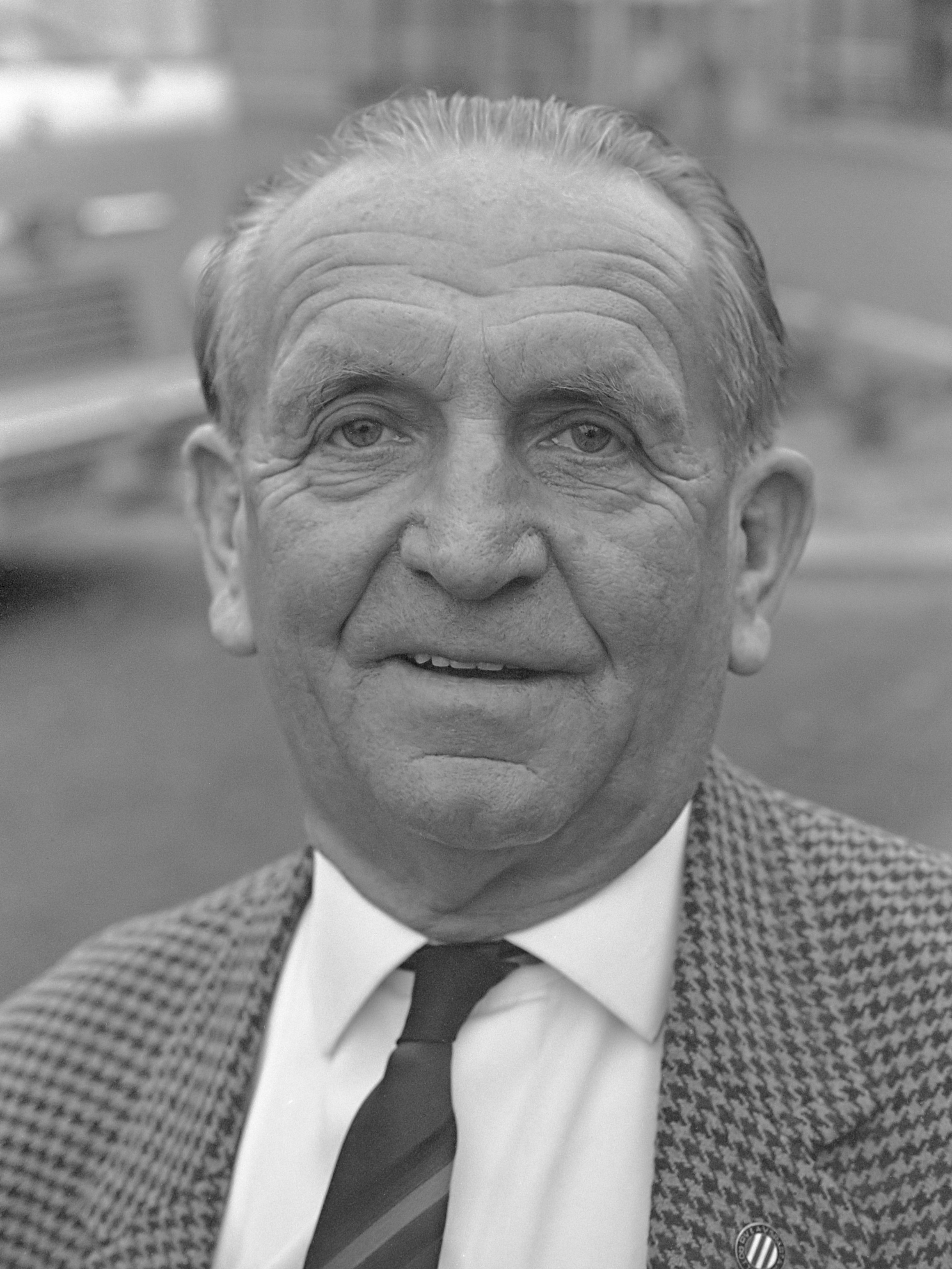
Under the guidance of Ignác Molnár, the club won many trophies

The Turkish Football Federation founded a professional national league in 1959, which continues today under the name of the Süper Lig. Fenerbahçe won the first tournament, beating archrivals Galatasaray 4–1 on aggregate. The next year, Fenerbahçe participated in the European Cup for the first time. They qualified through a 4–3 win over Csepel, being the first Turkish club to advance to the next round by eliminating its opponent. They lost their first-round match to Nice 1–5 in a playoff game after drawing on aggregate. Fenerbahçe reached the quarter-final of the 1963–64 European Cup Winners' Cup where it was eliminated by MTK Budapest.

Fenerbahçe won four more league titles in the 1960s and were runners-up three times, making it the most successful club of that era. Fenerbahçe was coached by Ignác Molnár at the time, a famous Hungarian coach who had introduced a new style of football in Turkey. Under his guidance, Fenerbahçe managed to eliminate English champions Manchester City in the first round of the 1968–69 European Cup.

In the 1966–67 Balkans Cup (a competition set up for Eastern European clubs from Albania, Bulgaria, Greece, Romania, Turkey and Yugoslavia that existed between the 1960–61 and 1993–94 seasons), Fenerbahçe won the cup after three final matches against Greek club AEK Athens, making them the first Turkish club to win a non-domestic competition. This success would remain unparalleled by a Turkish club until Sarıyer and Samsunspor won the cup many years later in the 1990s, when the competition lost much of its popularity.

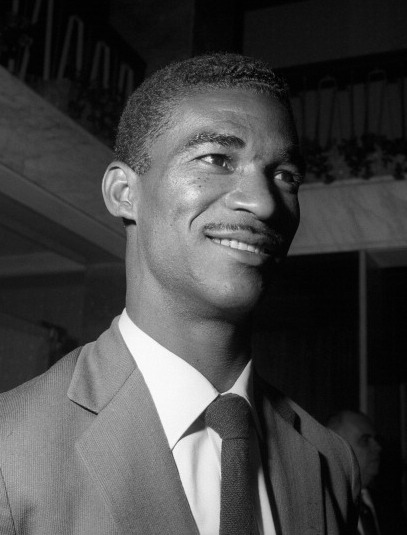
Didi coached the club between 1972 and 1975, winning eight trophies

The 1970s saw Fenerbahçe bring in the famous Didi as their new coach. Fenerbahçe won four more league titles, including a double with Cemil Turan being the top goal scorer three times. The 1970s also established a rivalry with Trabzonspor, where for almost a decade Fenerbahçe and Trabzonspor were competing with each other for the title. The 1980s saw Fenerbahçe win three more league titles. Under the guidance of Kálmán Mészöly, Fenerbahçe managed to eliminate French champions Bordeaux in the first round of the 1985–86 European Cup. This victory marked a turning point as for almost a decade no Turkish club managed to get past the first round in European competitions.

=== 1990s to 2000s ===
Galatasaray and Beşiktaş dominated the Turkish League during the 1990s, combining to win nine out of ten titles. Fenerbahçe's only Turkish League success during the 1990s came in the 1995–96 season under the guidance of Carlos Alberto Parreira. In the 1996–97 UEFA Champions League season, Fenerbahçe completed the group stage with seven points and, among others, defeated Manchester United 1–0 at Old Trafford, undoing the record of the English giants being unbeaten for 40 years in their home ground.

Fenerbahçe won the league title in 2001, denying Galatasaray a fifth consecutive title. It followed up the next season with a second-place behind Galatasaray with new coach Werner Lorant. However, the next season did not go so well as Fenerbahçe finished in sixth place. Despite this, that season is memorable to many Fenerbahçe fans due to a 6–0 win against arch-rivals Galatasaray at the Şükrü Saracoğlu Stadium on 6 November 2002. After firing Werner Lorant, the club hired another German coach, Christoph Daum. Daum had previously coached in Turkey, winning the league with Beşiktaş in 1994–95. Fenerbahçe brought in players including Pierre van Hooijdonk, Mehmet Aurélio and Fábio Luciano as part of a rebuilding process. These new players led Fenerbahçe to its 15th title and third star (one being awarded for every five league titles won by a club).

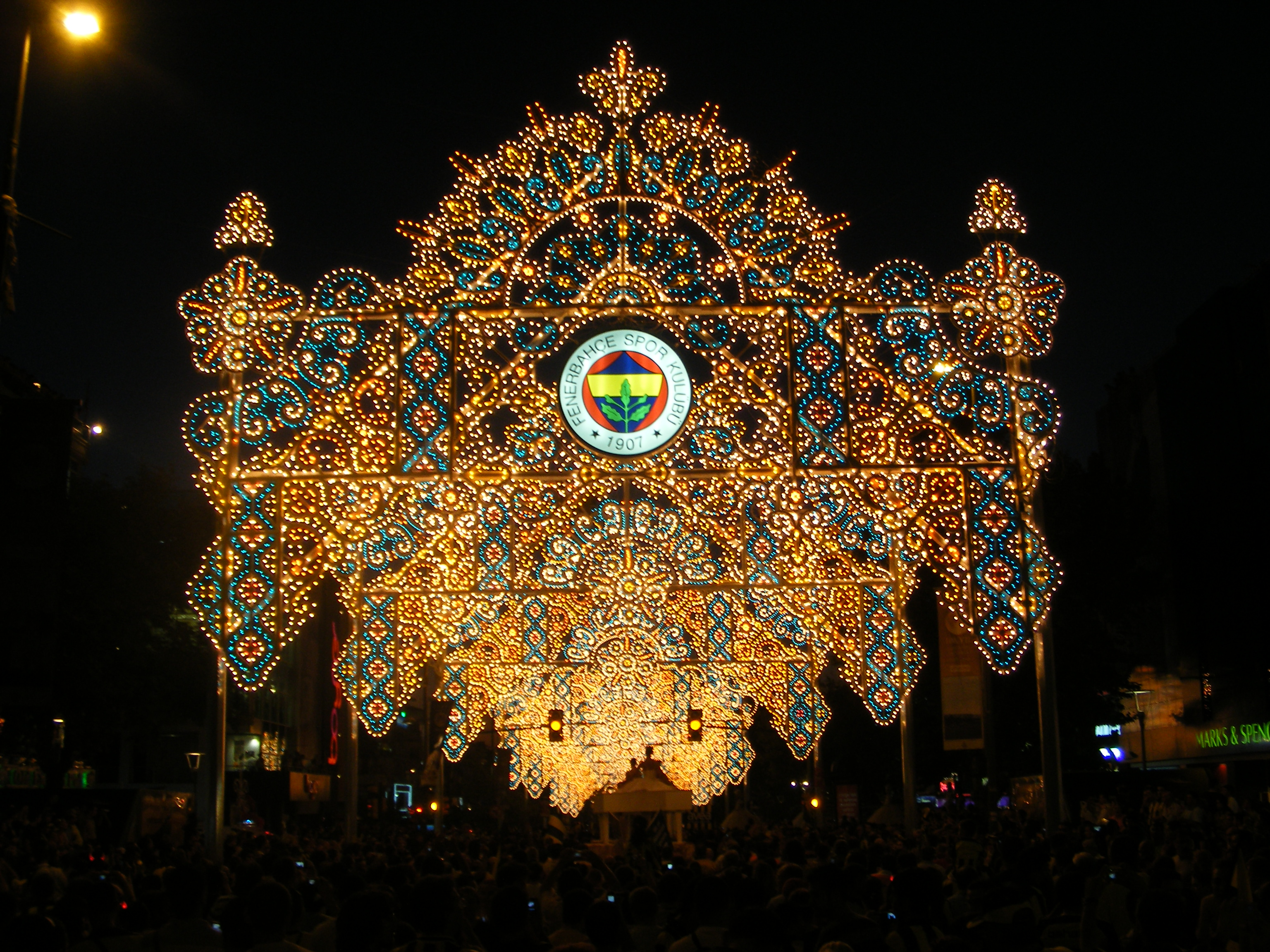
100th year celebration of the club

The next year was followed by a narrow championship over Trabzonspor, winning a then record 16 Turkish Football League championships. Fenerbahçe lost the title in the last week of the 2005–06 season to Galatasaray. Fenerbahçe needed a win, but instead drew 1–1 with Denizlispor while Galatasaray won 3–0 over Kayserispor. Soon after, Christoph Daum resigned as manager and was replaced by Zico on 4 July 2006. Zico began his reign by signing two new defenders: highly touted Uruguayan international Diego Lugano and Zico's fellow Brazilian Edu Dracena. Zico also signed two strikers in Serbian international Mateja Kežman and another Brazilian, Deivid. Fenerbahçe's 2006–07 domestic season started with a 6–0 win over relegation candidates Kayseri Erciyesspor. In the 32nd week of the Süper Lig, Fenerbahçe drew Trabzonspor 2–2, while Beşiktaş lost to Bursaspor 0–3, putting the former out of contention for the title. Fenerbahçe won its 17th Süper Lig title in 2006–07.

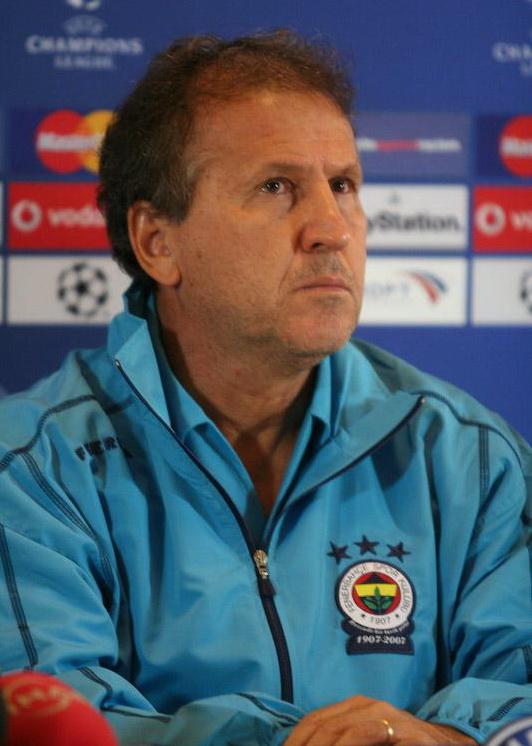
Zico coached the club between 2006 and 2008

On 11 January 2007, Fenerbahçe was officially invited to G-14, an association consisting of top European clubs.

Under Zico's command, Fenerbahçe qualified from the 2007–08 Champions League group stage for the first time and went on to beat Sevilla to become a quarter-finalist in the 2007–08 season. Zico is also the most successful manager of the team's history in the Champions League. After successful scores both in the Turkish league and international matches, Zico gained a new nickname from the Fenerbahçe fans: Kral Arthur (meaning "King Arthur" in Turkish). In February 2009, Fenerbahçe became the first Turkish club to enter the Deloitte Football Money League. From 2000 on, Fenerbahçe improved the club's finances and facilities, bringing world stars to the club such as Ariel Ortega, Pierre van Hooijdonk, Alex, Stephen Appiah, Nicolas Anelka and, more recently, Mateja Kežman, Roberto Carlos, Dani Güiza, Dirk Kuyt, Diego, Nani, Robin van Persie and Mesut Özil.

=== 2010s to present ===
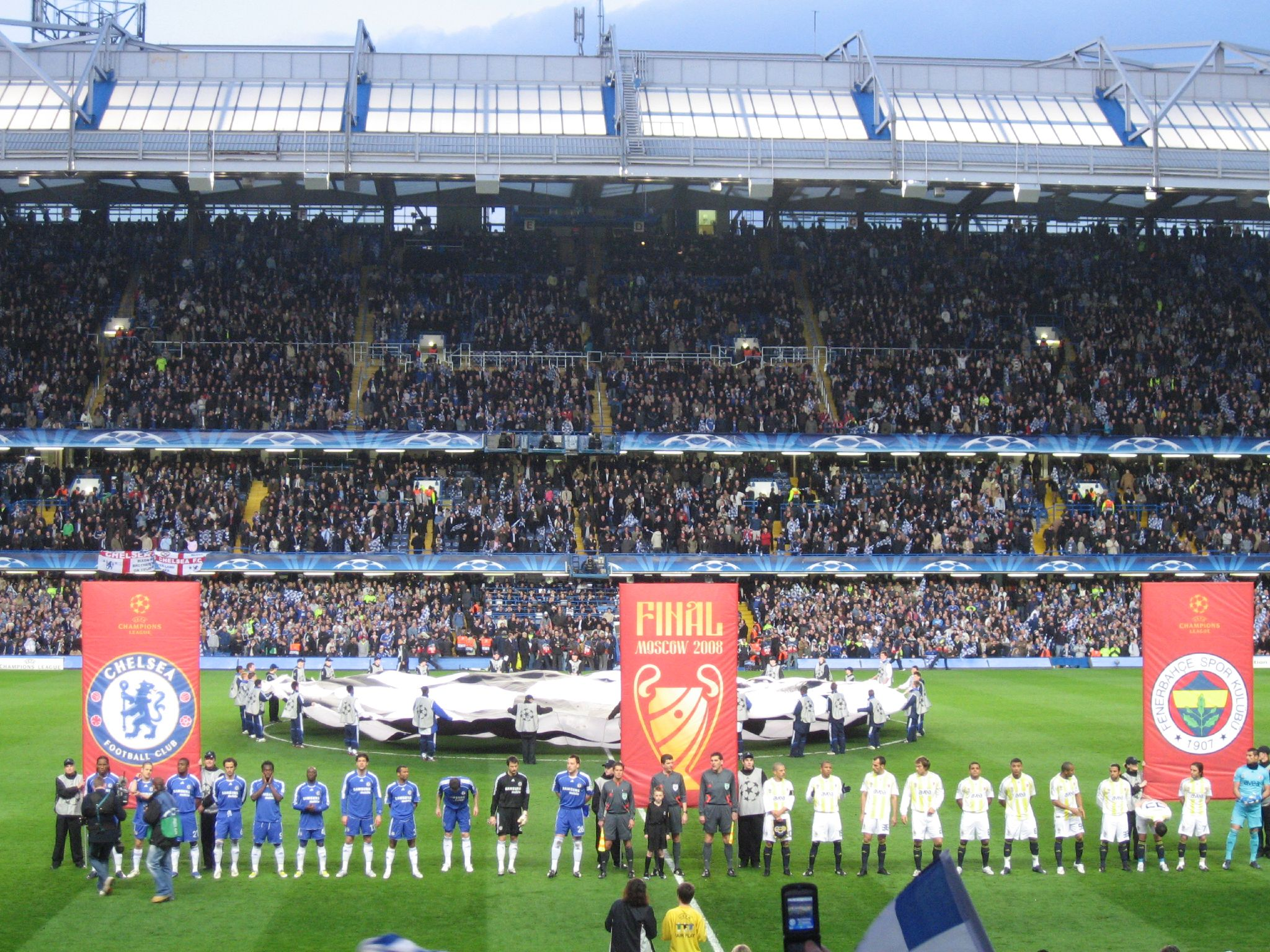
Chelsea v Fenerbahçe, 8 April 2008 (Champions League QF, 2nd match)

In the 2009–10 season, Fenerbahçe lost the title on the last matchday; Fenerbahçe players were told that a draw would be enough towards the end of the match only to find out that the other critical game went against their favour, as Bursaspor beat Beşiktaş 2–1 to win the title. Despite the title loss, Fenerbahçe ended the season with the most clean sheets (10), as well as the joint longest winning streak (8). In July 2011, Fenerbahçe fans invaded the pitch during a friendly against the Ukrainian champions Shakhtar Donetsk. As punishment, Fenerbahçe were sentenced to two Süper Lig games in an empty stadium. The TFF later allowed those two games to be filled with spectators; men were barred, while women and children under 12 were admitted for free.

On 29 October 2012, Antalyaspor ended Fenerbahçe's 47-match unbeaten run in the Süper Lig at the Şükrü Saracoğlu Stadium. Fenerbahçe had not lost a match at home since their 2–3 defeat by eventual champions Bursaspor in week 22, on 22 February 2010. Fenerbahçe won 38 and drew 9 in the 47 matches they played within 980 days of that date. On 3 November 2012, Fenerbahçe pecked Akhisar Belediyespor to break a 181-day away jinx.

On 2 May 2013, Fenerbahçe were eliminated by Benfica 3–2 on aggregate in the semi-final of the 2012–13 Europa League, one of the biggest successes in Fenerbahçe's history in UEFA competitions. On 28 June 2013, Ersun Yanal agreed to take charge of Fenerbahçe to replace Aykut Kocaman, who resigned in late May.

Ersun Yanal's appointment coincided with tough times for Fenerbahçe, who had just been banned from European competitions for two seasons over their alleged involvement in a domestic sports corruption scandal. Fenerbahçe, which finished second in the Süper Lig in 2012–13, thus missed out on the 2013–14 Champions League, which it had been due to enter in the third qualifying round. Fenerbahçe finished the 2014–15 season as runners-up, forcing the board of directors to undertake some major changes.

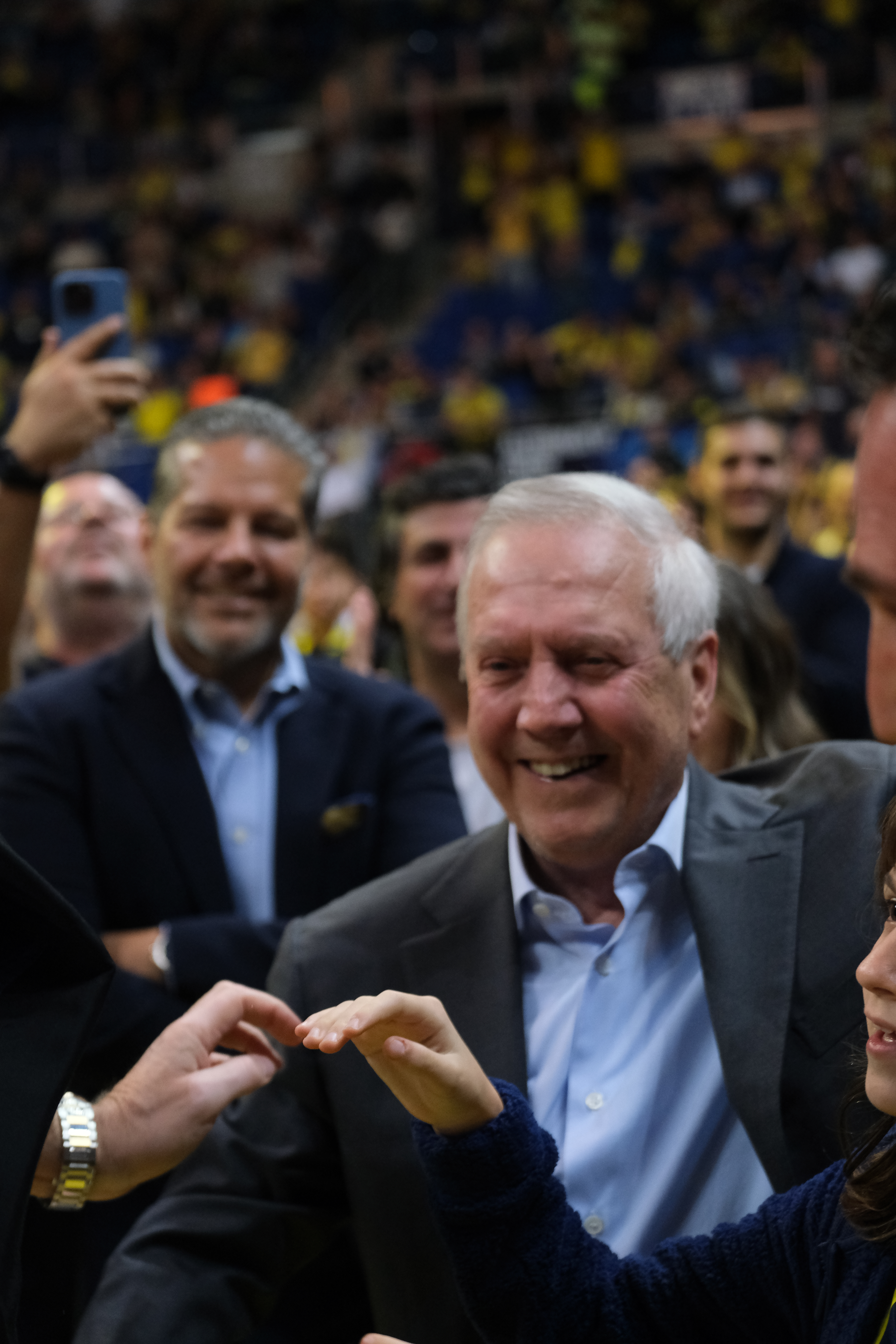
Aziz Yıldırım in 2024. As the 37th president, he served from 1998 to 2018

For the 2015–16 season, Fenerbahçe brought in Vítor Pereira as their new coach. Portuguese star Nani, Danish defender Simon Kjær and Robin van Persie were added to the squad to fulfill the club's ambitions to be successful in the Süper Lig and European competitions. On 10 December 2015, Fenerbahçe played their 200th European game against Celtic.

Between 2015 and 2018, Fenerbahçe remained a strong contender in the Süper Lig, consistently finishing in the upper ranks of the league. However, despite their competitive performances, the team faced challenges in securing domestic trophies, with arch-rivals Galatasaray and Beşiktaş often outperforming them. Their European campaigns during this period were marked by sporadic successes, but they struggled to make significant progress in continental competitions.

In 2018, a major turning point occurred in the club's history when Ali Koç was elected president, ending Aziz Yıldırım's 20-year tenure at Fenerbahçe. His landslide victory reflected fans' desire for change, with promises of modernization, financial restructuring, transparency, and youth development. Despite early challenges like financial constraints and underperformance, Koç stayed committed to long-term planning and rebuilding the club's structure.

From 2018 to 2023, the club underwent a period of transition, characterized by frequent managerial changes and inconsistent performances. Despite efforts to stabilize the team, Fenerbahçe often finished outside the top positions in the league. Financial constraints also limited their ability to attract top-tier talent, further complicating their efforts to reclaim domestic dominance. However, the club continued investing in youth development and long-term infrastructural projects to lay the foundation for future success. On 12 October 2022, Fenerbahçe played their 250th European game against AEK Larnaca.

A turning point occurred in the 2023–24 season with the appointment of İsmail Kartal as head coach. Under his leadership, Fenerbahçe displayed a renewed sense of competitiveness, finishing second in the Süper Lig with 99 points, narrowly missing out on the title to Galatasaray, who secured 102 points. The team exhibited strong performances across all competitions but was eliminated in the quarterfinals of both the Turkish Cup and the UEFA Conference League. The season was also marked by major controversies. During a heated Süper Lig match in March 2024, Fenerbahçe defeated Trabzonspor 3-2 away, after which Trabzonspor fans stormed the pitch, attacking Fenerbahçe players and causing chaotic scenes. The violence, widely shared on social media, led to public outrage and disciplinary investigations by the Turkish Football Federation.

Another major incident involved the 2023 Turkish Super Cup, originally scheduled for 29 December 2023 in Riyadh, Saudi Arabia, Fenerbahçe and Galatasaray withdrew due to disagreements over ceremonial elements, particularly the display of banners referencing Mustafa Kemal Atatürk, which Saudi authorities disallowed. The match was rescheduled for 7 April 2024 at Şanlıurfa 11 Nisan Stadium in Turkey. Fenerbahçe fielded their U19 squad and walked off the pitch after one minute in protest, leading to a forfeit and awarding the victory to their arch-rivals Galatasaray.

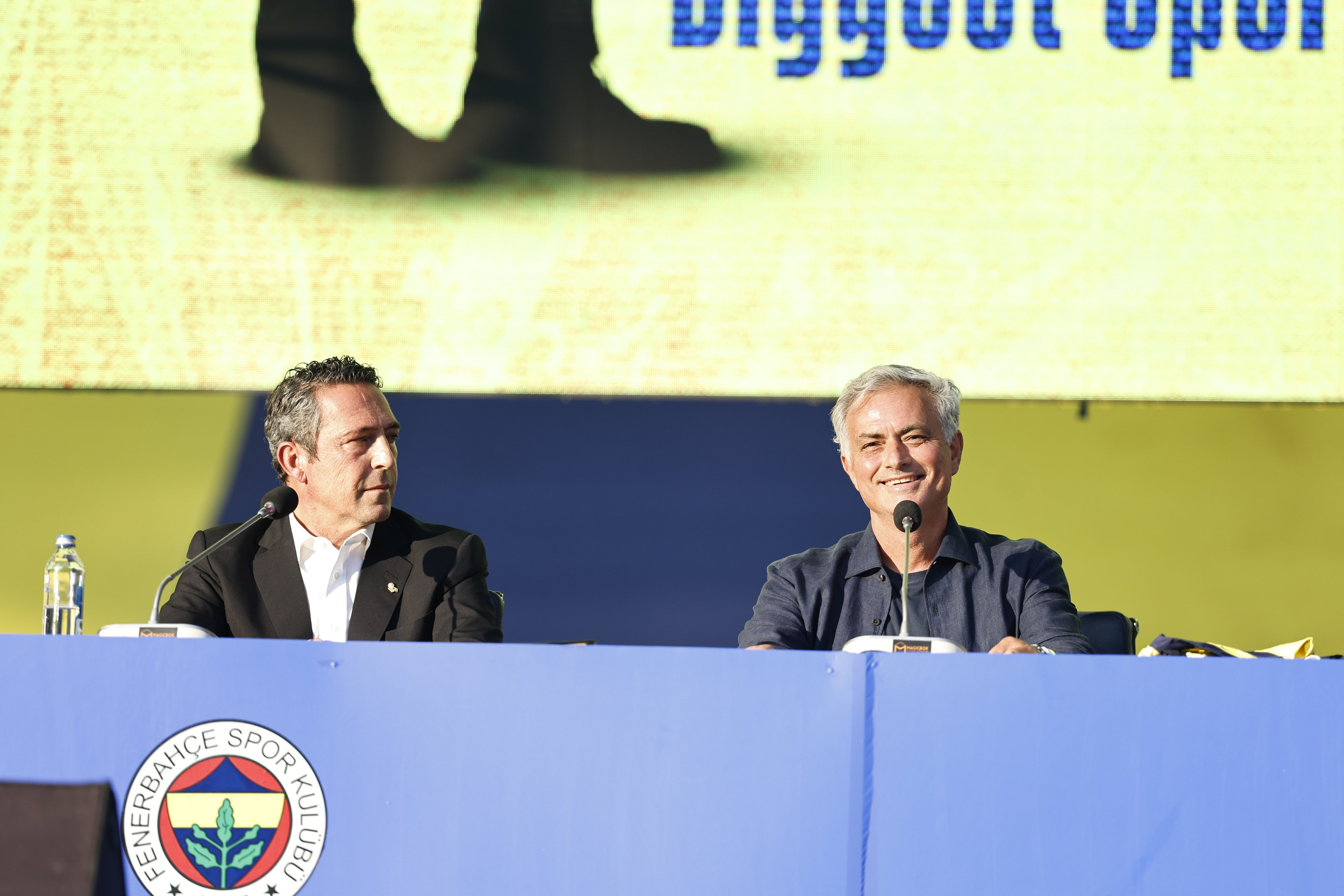
José Mourinho and Ali Koç on the general assembly meeting

In mid-2024, Fenerbahçe appointed José Mourinho as head coach, signalling the club's ambition to reclaim domestic and European success. At the ceremony held on 2 June, Mourinho embraced the challenge ahead of the new season, declaring that "This jersey is my skin".

Mourinho's tenure began with a series of strong performances, with the team securing 16 wins in 27 matches across all competitions by early 2025. However, his time at the club has also been marked by controversy, most notably his outspoken criticism of refereeing standards in Turkish football, alleging bias in favor of rivals Galatasaray. Tensions peaked following Fenerbahçe's Turkish Cup quarter-final loss, when Mourinho was caught pinching the nose of Galatasaray coach Okan Buruk during a post-match scuffle, leading to a three-match ban. On 29 August 2025, Mourinho was sacked from his role as head coach; he was replaced by Domenico Tedesco. A month later, Sadettin Saran replaced Ali Koç as the president of the club.

In 2026, Aziz Yıldırım succeeded Sadettin Saran, who won the Turkish Super Cup the previous year, while Ismail Kartal guided Fenerbahçe through the preliminary rounds to qualify for the 2026–27 UEFA Champions League after an 18-year absence.

== Notable players ==
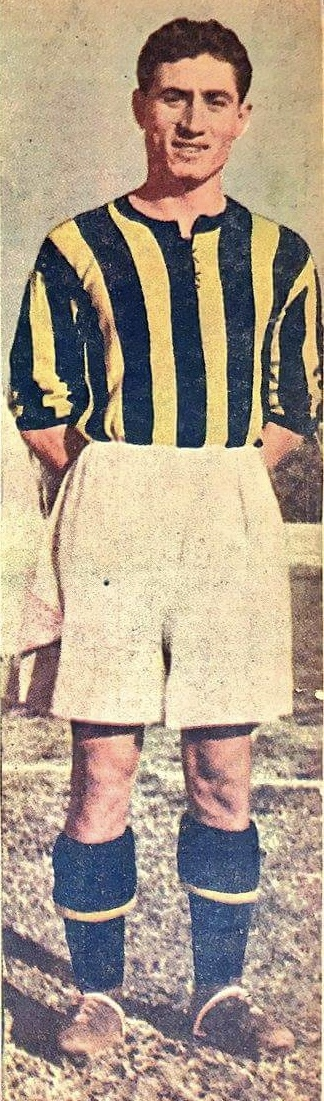
Lefter Küçükandonyadis, nicknamed "Ordinaryus" and named "one of the 200 most important footballers of the 20th c." by World Soccer magazine

When it was first founded in 1907, Fenerbahçe had a large squad. The first team captain of the Fenerbahçe football team was Turkish Naval School student Necip Okaner, the club's 3rd founding member. The first goalkeeper of the team was Asaf Beşpınar, a student of Kadıköy Lycée Saint-Joseph. Galip Kulaksızoğlu, was the longest serving player of the original squad, spending 17 years at the club, retiring in 1924 after 216 matches. Zeki Rıza Sporel and Bekir Refet, the first Turkish footballer ever to play abroad, were among the first products of the Fenerbahçe youth system. During his 18-year career with the club, Zeki Rıza scored 470 goals in 352 matches, or 1.3 goals every match, making him the all-time top scorer of Fenerbahçe. Zeki Rıza was also capped for the Turkish national team 16 times, scoring 15 goals.

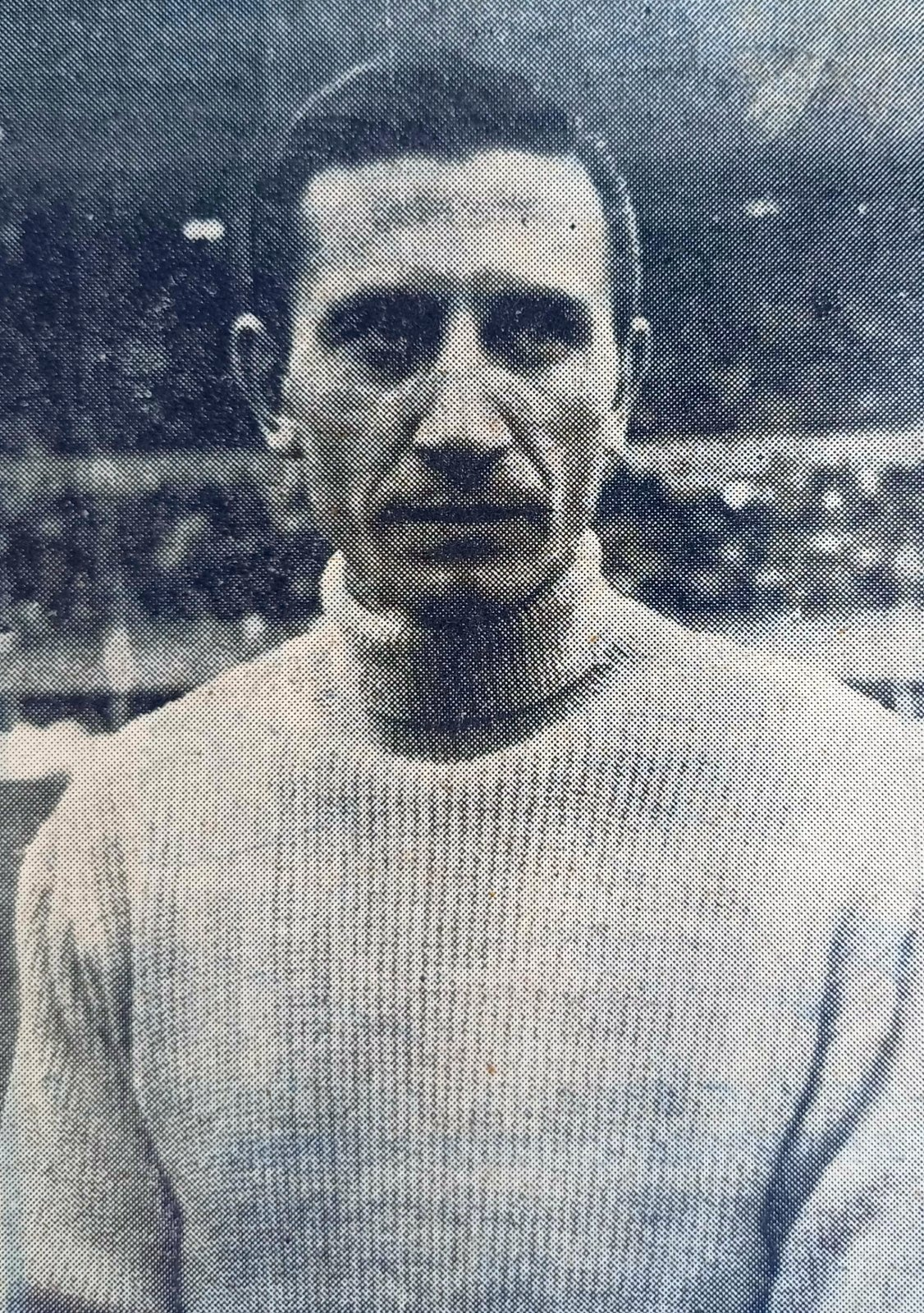
Cihat Arman, one of the club's legendary goalkeepers, was given the nickname "Sarı Kanarya" (Yellow Canary) by the fans for the saves he made while wearing the "yellow jersey" in every match, and this nickname has become an icon of the club that has been carried to this day

Cihat Arman became the first in a long-line of long-serving goalkeepers, playing 12 seasons and in 308 matches with the club. Lefter Küçükandonyadis was one of the first Turkish football players to play in Europe. Lefter spent two seasons in Europe, playing for Fiorentina and Nice before returning to Fenerbahçe. All in all, Lefter scored 423 goals in 615 matches for the club, helping them to two Istanbul Football League titles and three Turkish League titles.

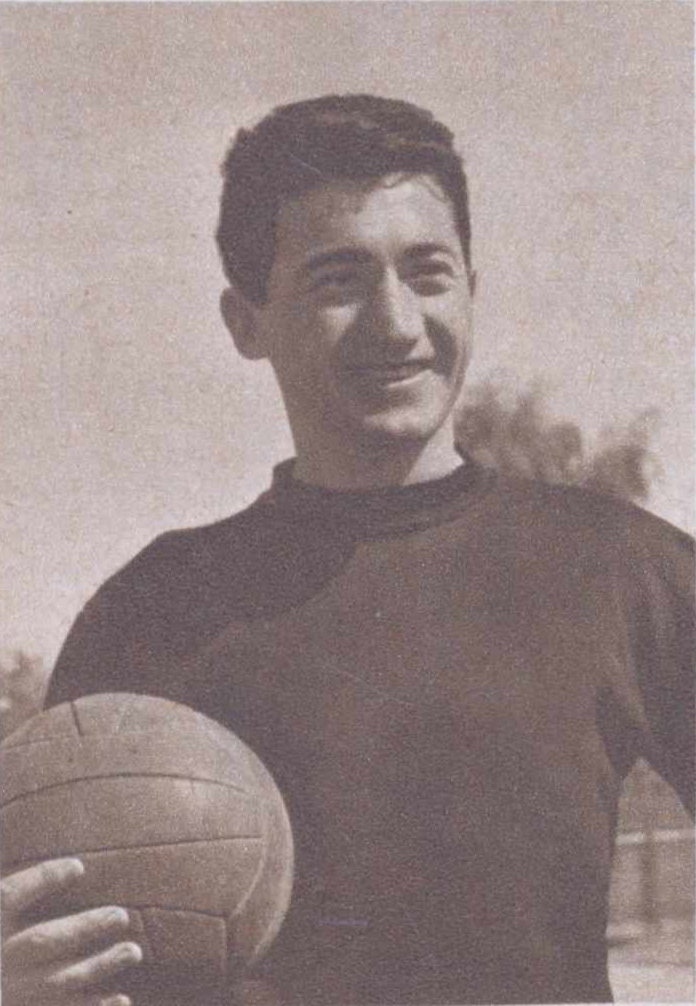
Goalkeeper Ilie Datcu was the first foreigner to make 100 league appearances for the club. In the 1969-70 season, Fenerbahçe conceded only six goals in 30 games, which is still a Süper Lig record today.

Another notable player, Can Bartu, became the next big Turkish export to Europe. He was also the first Turkish football player to play in a European competition final, doing so with Fiorentina against Atlético Madrid in 1962. Can also spent some seasons playing for Venezia and Lazio before returning to Fenerbahçe in 1967. He was a four-time league champion with Fenerbahçe and scored 162 goals in 330 matches. Some of the other most notable Turkish players who played for Fenerbahçe include Fikret Arıcan, Fikret Kırcan, Halit Deringör, Melih Kotanca, Burhan Sargun, Nedim Doğan, Cemil Turan, Selçuk Yula, Müjdat Yetkiner, Oğuz Çetin, Rıdvan Dilmen, Aykut Kocaman, Rüştü Reçber and Tuncay Şanlı.

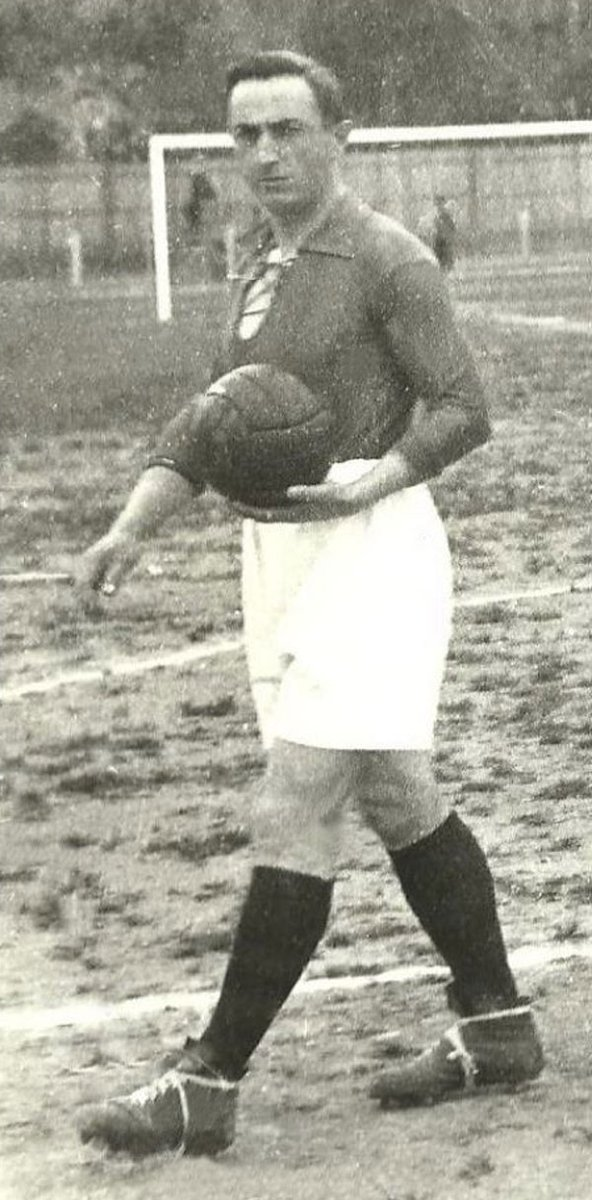
Zeki Rıza Sporel, who scored 473 goals in 352 matches and achieved an average of 1.34 goals per match, went down in Turkish football history as one of the players who scored the most goals. He also scored the first goal of the Turkish national football team in 1923

In recent decades, Fenerbahçe have gained an influx of foreigners who have helped the club to 19 Süper Lig titles. Among these is Uche Okechukwu, who after 13 seasons with Fenerbahçe and İstanbulspor became the longest serving foreigner in Turkey. During Uche's career with Fenerbahçe, he won two league titles and became a fan favourite. More recently, Fenerbahçe have been the home to Brazilian-born Mehmet Aurélio who, in 2006, became the first naturalized Turkish citizen to play for the Turkish national team.

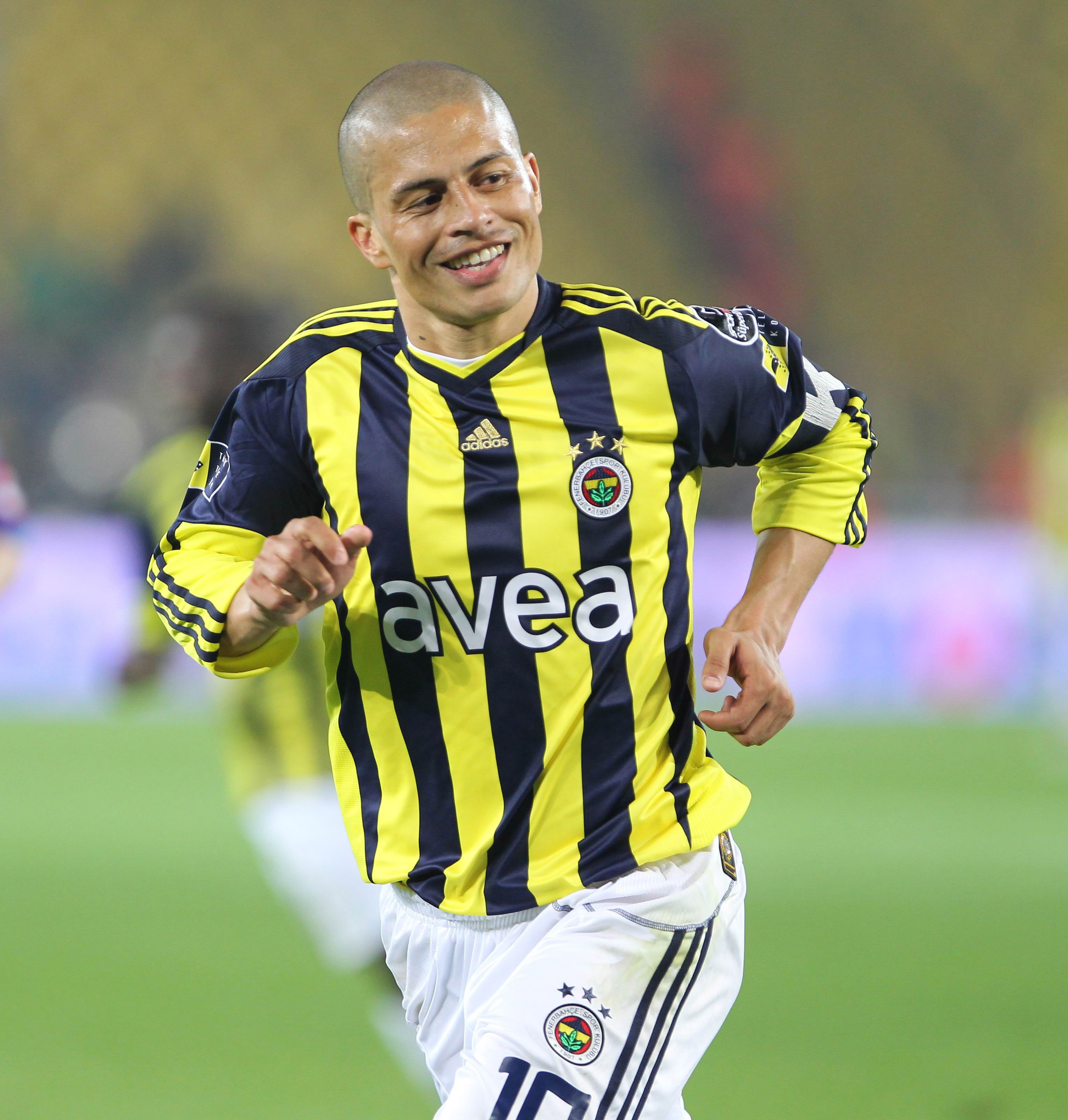
Alex, captain of Fenerbahçe from 2007 to 2012 and the most successful foreign player in the history of the club.

Alex is a former Brazilian player who holds the record for most goals scored out of all foreign players who have played for Fenerbahçe. He managed to become top scorer of the Turkish Süper Lig on two occasions (in 2006–07 and 2010–11), Turkish Footballer of the Year twice (in 2005 and 2010), as well as assist leader in the 2007–08 season of the UEFA Champions League. Based on all those achievements, as well as his exemplary character and sportsmanship on and off the field, acknowledged by fans of Fenerbahçe and their rivals alike, he is considered the most successful and renowned foreign player to have ever played for the club and one of a few whose statue has been erected by the supporters of the club in the Yoğurtçu Park, in the near of Şükrü Saracoğlu Stadium.

Some of the other foreign top players who played for Fenerbahçe over the years include: Toni Schumacher (1988–91), Jes Høgh (1995–99), Jay-Jay Okocha (1996–98), Elvir Bolić (1995–00), Viorel Moldovan (1998–00), Kennet Andersson (2000–02), Ariel Ortega (2002–03), Pierre van Hooijdonk (2003–05), Nicolas Anelka (2005–06), Stephen Appiah (2005–08), Mateja Kežman (2006–09), Diego Lugano (2006–11), Roberto Carlos (2007–09), Dirk Kuyt (2012–15), Raul Meireles (2012–16), Robin van Persie (2015–18), Nani (2015–16), Simon Kjær (2015-17), Mesut Özil (2021–22), Leonardo Bonucci (2022–23) and Edin Džeko (2023–25).

=== Players with the most appearances ===
Period	Players
1934 - 1956 (22 years, 412 Match)	Fikret Kırcan
1927 - 1947 (20 years, 406 Match)	Fikret Arıcan
1915 - 1934 (19 years, 325 Match)	Zeki Rıza Sporel
2002 - 2019 (17 years, 526 Match)	Volkan Demirel
1907 - 1924 (17 years, 257 Match)	Galip Kulaksızoğlu
1916 - 1932 (16 years, 324 Match)	Alaattin Baydar
1979 - 1995 (16 years, 763 Match)	Müjdat Yetkiner
1947 - 1964 (15 years, 615 Match)	Lefter Küçükandonyadis
1939 - 1953 (14 years, 308 Match)	Cihat Arman
1925 - 1939 (14 years, 252 Match)	Cevat Seyit
1955 - 1969 (14 years, 605 Match)	Şeref Has
1932 - 1945 (13 years, 368 Match)	Esat Kaner
1934 - 1947 (13 years, 388 Match)	Naci Bastoncu

=== Team captains ===
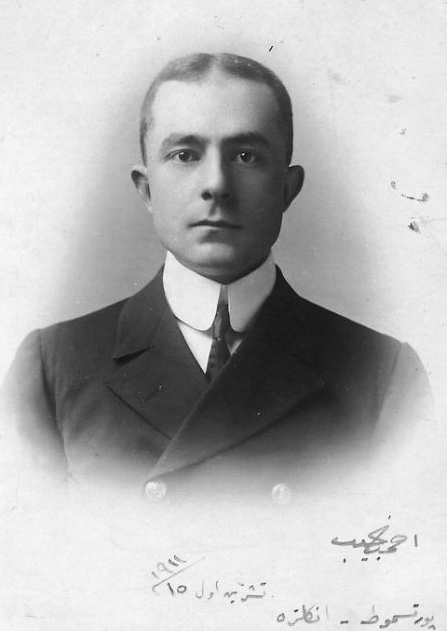
Necip Okaner, the first captain of the team (1907-08)

Period	Team captain
3 May 1907 – 1908	Necip Okaner
1908 – 7 March 1924	Galip Kulaksızoğlu
7 March 1924 – 1 June 1934	Zeki Rıza Sporel
1 June 1934 – 16 May 1943	Fikret Arıcan
16 May 1943 – 1951	Cihat Arman
1951 – 7 October 1956	Fikret Kırcan
7 October 1956 – 11 June 1963	Naci Erdem
11 June 1963 – 24 June 1968	Şeref Has
27 June 1968 – 6 September 1970	Can Bartu
7 September 1970 – 3 August 1975	Ziya Şengül
11 August 1975 – 15 August 1980	Cemil Turan
24 August 1980 – 29 July 1983	Alpaslan Eratlı
2 August 1983 – 17 May 1985	Cem Pamiroğlu
28 June 1985 – 6 April 1987; 20 September 1992 – 19 June 1993	Müjdat Yetkiner
8 June 1987 – 23 May 1988; 7 May 1990 – 11 July 1990	Şenol Çorlu
23 May 1988 – 7 May 1990; 5 July 1990 – 21 May 1991	Tony Schumacher
28 May 1991 – 21 June 1992	Rıdvan Dilmen
21 June 1992 – 24 May 1996	Oğuz Çetin
24 May 1996 – 1 June 2000	Rüştü Reçber
1 June 2000 – 18 March 2003	Ogün Temizkanoğlu
18 March 2003 – 26 May 2007	Ümit Özat
26 June 2007 – 1 October 2012	Alex de Souza
2 October 2012 – 2 February 2013 7 June 2015 – 2 July 2019	Volkan Demirel
2 February 2013 – 7 June 2015; 2 July 2019 – 25 July 2020	Emre Belözoğlu
10 August 2020 – 13 July 2021	Gökhan Gönül
13 August 2021 – 24 March 2022	Mesut Özil
24 March 2022 – 14 August 2022	Altay Bayındır
14 August 2022 – 12 July 2023	Arda Güler
12 July 2023 – 30 May 2025	Edin Džeko
5 August 2025 – Today	Milan Škriniar

=== Milestone goals ===
As of 21 January 2026.

Goal no.	Date	Scorer	Opponent	Result
1st	21 February 1959	Ergun Öztuna	Ankaragücü	3–1
1000th	1 March 1980	Erol Togay	Adana Demirspor	1–1
2000th	26 October 1996	Uche Okechukwu	Trabzonspor	1–0
3000th	22 November 2010	Alex de Souza	Bucaspor	5–2
4000th	9 February 2025	Sebastian Szymański	Alanyaspor	2–0

== Support ==
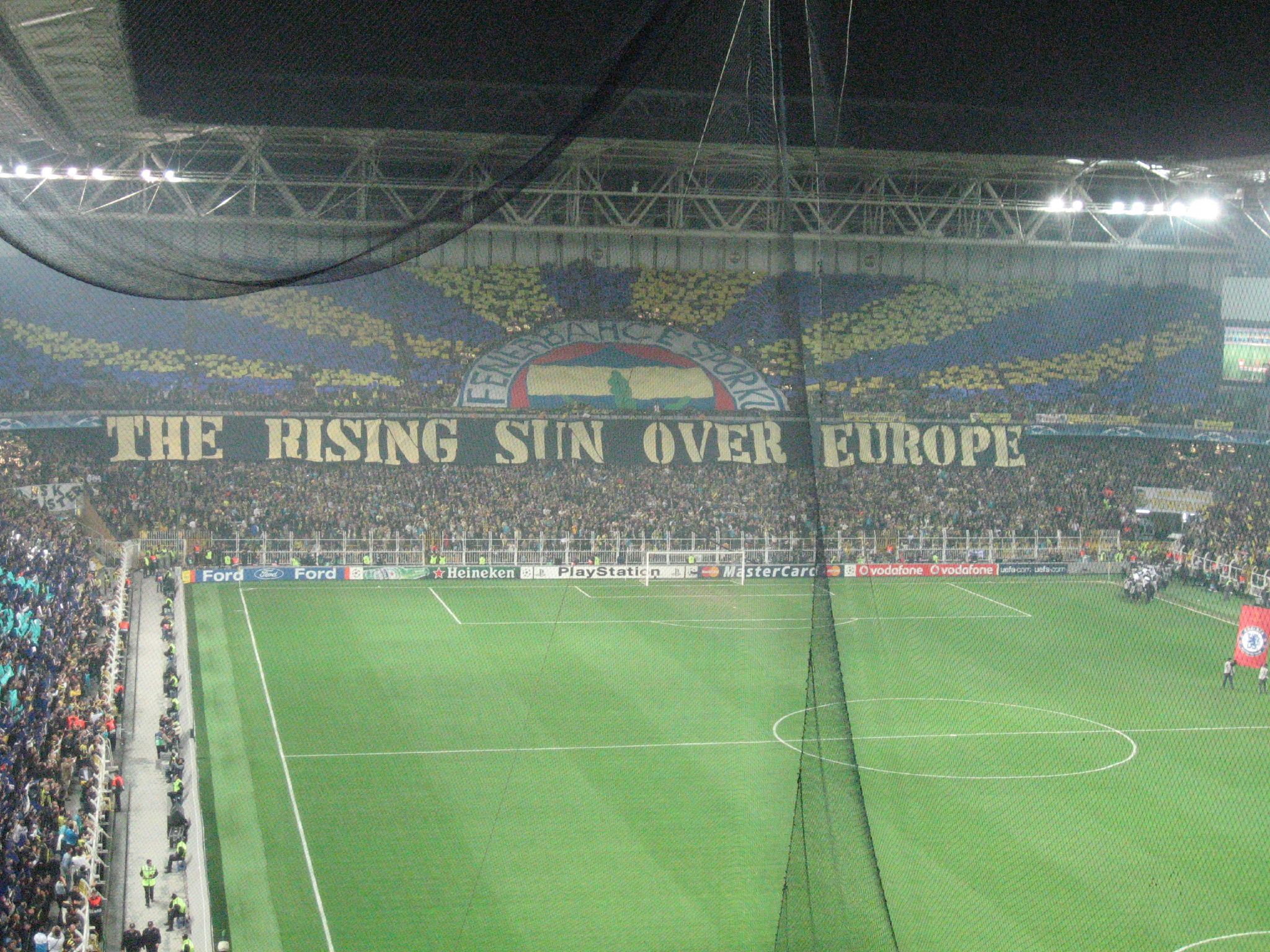
Fener supporters in the stadium during the Champions League QF match (2008 vs Chelsea)

Fenerbahçe has built a massive fanbase since its establishment in 1907, ranking among the most widely supported clubs in Turkey. Approximately 35% of Turkish football fans back Fenerbahçe, making it the most popular club in Istanbul and Ankara. Their influence extends beyond Turkey, with passionate supporters in Northern Cyprus, Azerbaijan, and various Turkish diaspora communities. Thanks to the redevelopment of the Şükrü Saracoğlu Stadium, the club consistently boasts some of the highest attendance figures in Turkish football.

The club's supporters are organized into various groups, including Genç Fenerbahçeliler (GFB), Kill For You (KFY), Antu/Fenerlist, EuroFeb (a group for fans in Europe), Group CK (Cefakâr Kanaryalar), 1907 ÜNİFEB, Vamos Bien, and SUADFEB. Beyond official fan organizations, numerous fanzines, blogs, podcasts, and forums are dedicated to covering Fenerbahçe.

=== Bonds with other clubs ===
Fenerbahçe's fanbase has formed friendships with other clubs' supporters over the years. In November 2011, Genç Fenerbahçeliler developed a close relationship with Torcida Sandžak, the organized supporters of Serbian club Novi Pazar. During a Süper Lig match against İstanbul Büyükşehir Belediyespor, Fenerbahçe fans unveiled a banner that read Kalbimiz Seninle Novi Pazar ("Novi Pazar, Our Hearts Are With You"). Later, in a SuperLiga match against Radnički Kragujevac, Torcida Sandžak reciprocated the gesture with a banner stating Sancak'ta atıyor, Fenerbahçe'nin kalbi ("The heart of Fenerbahçe beats in Sandžak"). This friendship continued on 2 March 2012, when Genç Fenerbahçeliler and 1907 Gençlik members were invited to Novi Pazar for a match against Partizan. The 17 traveling Fenerbahçe supporters received a warm welcome from thousands of Torcida Sandžak members, solidifying the bond between the two groups.

== Rivalries ==
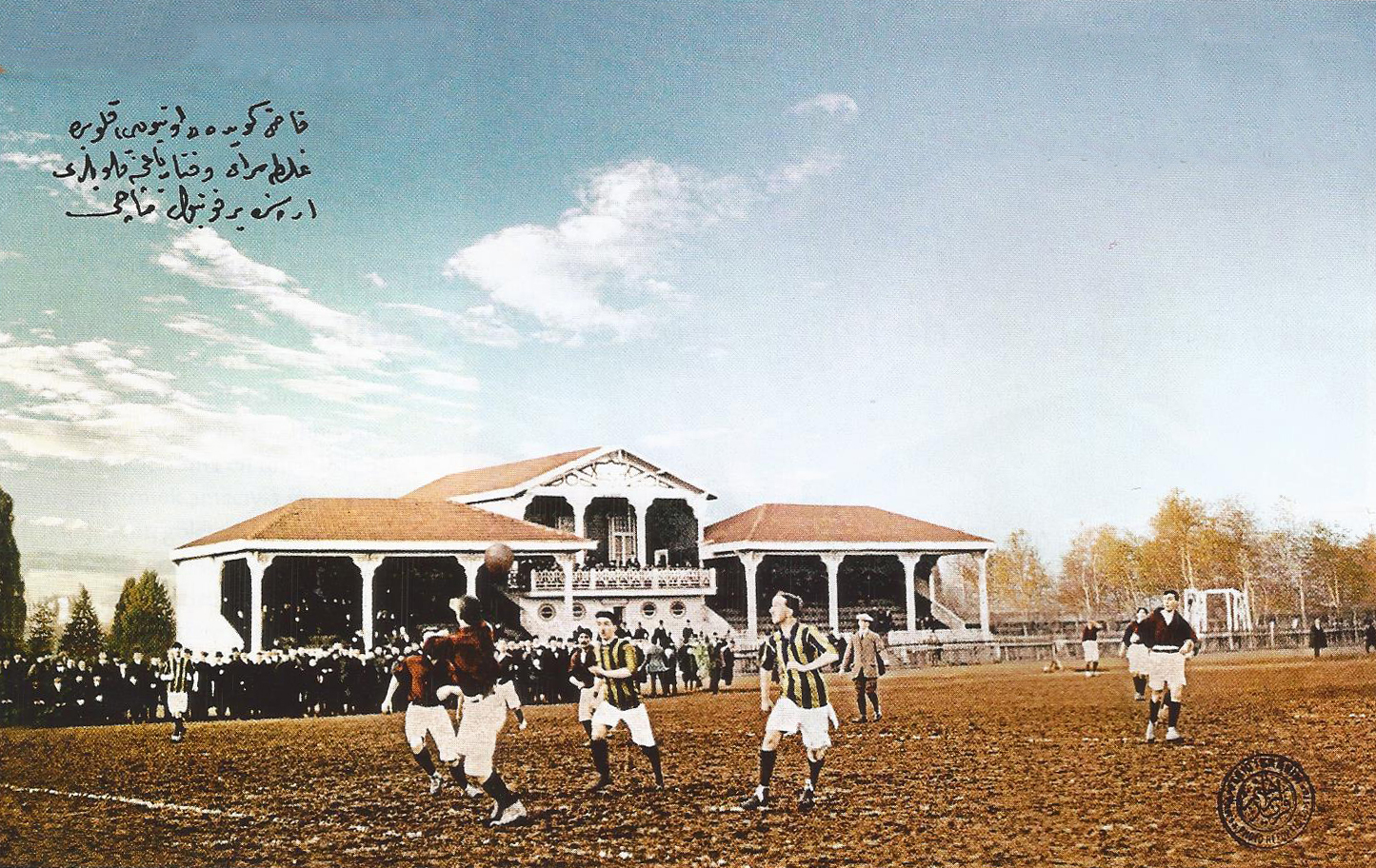
Fenerbahçe against Galatasaray in 1914

=== The Intercontinental Derby ===
The Intercontinental Derby is the fierce football rivalry between Galatasaray and Fenerbahçe, the two most successful and popular clubs in Turkey. The name comes from the fact that Galatasaray is based on the European side of Istanbul, while Fenerbahçe is based on the Asian side, making it an intercontinental rivalry. This derby is one of the most intense in world football, with both clubs having passionate fan bases.

The rivalry dates back to 1909, and over the years, it has been marked by on-field clashes, controversial moments, and incredible atmospheres. Matches between the two are always high-stakes, often deciding league titles or cup victories. Fenerbahçe has traditionally been dominant in head-to-head records, especially in matches played at their home stadium, the Şükrü Saracoğlu Stadium, while Galatasaray has enjoyed international success, winning the UEFA Cup and UEFA Super Cup in 2000. The rivalry is deeply rooted in Turkish football culture, with fans eagerly anticipating each encounter.

One of the most unforgettable matches in derby history was played on 6 November 2002, when Fenerbahçe defeated Galatasaray 6–0 in a historic Süper Lig encounter. The match, played at the Şükrü Saracoğlu Stadium, remains Fenerbahçe's biggest victory over their arch-rivals. This result became one of the most talked-about moments in Turkish football history, particularly among Fenerbahçe fans.

However, nearly two decades later, Galatasaray had their own historic victory. On 23 February 2020, during the 2019–20 Süper Lig season, Galatasaray defeated Fenerbahçe 3–1 at the Şükrü Saracoğlu Stadium, marking their first away victory in the derby in 20 years. This match was a monumental moment for Galatasaray fans, as they had not won at Fenerbahçe's home since 1999.

=== Beşiktaş–Fenerbahçe Rivalry ===
The Beşiktaş–Fenerbahçe rivalry is another major Istanbul derby, contested between Beşiktaş and Fenerbahçe. While not as internationally famous as the Intercontinental Derby, this rivalry is just as intense within Turkey. Both clubs have large and loyal followings, with Beşiktaş fans known for their organized chants and intense stadium atmosphere. The matches between these two teams have historically been highly competitive, often featuring dramatic goals, red cards, and heated moments.

One of the key aspects of this rivalry is the contrast in club identity—Beşiktaş is often associated with a more working-class, rebellious spirit, while Fenerbahçe is seen as a wealthier and more powerful institution. Both clubs have multiple league titles and have had periods of dominance in Turkish football. The matches between these two teams are always filled with passion, pride, and sometimes even controversy, making them one of the most eagerly anticipated fixtures in the Süper Lig.

== Stadium ==
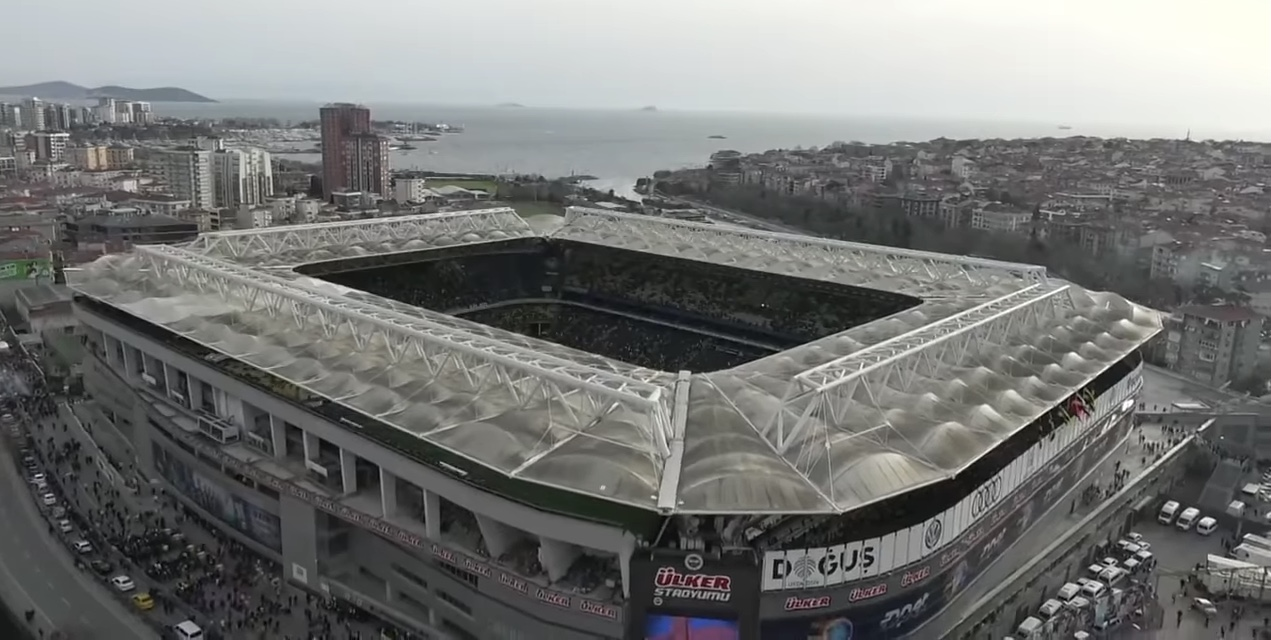
Top view of the Şükrü Saracoğlu Stadium

Fenerbahçe play their home matches at the Şükrü Saracoğlu Stadium, their own traditional home ground in the Kadıköy district of Istanbul, since 1908. Most recently renovated between 1999 and 2006, its capacity is 47,911. The club's museum has been situated in the stadium since 2005, after having been housed at a variety of locations. Before Şükrü Saracoğlu Stadium was built, the field was known as Papazın Çayırı ("The field of the priest"). The field, however, became the first football pitch of Turkey, where the first league games of the Istanbul Football League were all held successively. In 1908, local teams of the league needed a regular football field, so this land was leased from the Ottoman Sultan Abdul Hamid II for 30 Ottoman gold pounds a year. The total construction cost was 3,000 Ottoman gold pounds. The name was changed to the Union Club Field after the club which made the highest donation for the construction.

The Union Club Field was used by many teams in İstanbul, including the owner, Union Club (which changed its name to İttihatspor after World War I), Fenerbahçe, Galatasaray, and Beşiktaş. However, it had lost its importance when a bigger venue, the Taksim Stadium, was built in 1922, inside the courtyard of the historic Taksim Topçu Kışlası (Taksim Artillery Barracks), which was located at the present-day Taksim Gezi Parkı (Taksim Park). İttihatspor (which had close relations with the political Committee of Union and Progress), was forced to sell it to the state, in which Şükrü Saracoğlu was a member of the CHP government. Thus, the ownership of the stadium passed to the state, but the field was immediately leased to Fenerbahçe.

Later, on 27 May 1933, Fenerbahçe purchased the stadium from the government when Şükrü Saracoğlu was the president of Fenerbahçe, for either the symbolic amount of 1 TL or the worth of the stadium which was 9,000 TL. The name of the field was changed to Fenerbahçe Stadium, and this made Fenerbahçe the first football club in Turkey to own their stadium, with the help of the government. In the following years, Fenerbahçe renovated the stadium and increased its seating capacity. By 1949, Fenerbahçe Stadium was the largest football venue in Turkey, with a seating capacity of 25,000. The name of the stadium was changed once more in 1998, becoming Fenerbahçe Şükrü Saracoğlu Stadium, named after Fenerbahçe's president and Turkey's fifth Prime Minister, Şükrü Saracoğlu. In 1999, the latest round of renovations and capacity increasing projects started. The tribunes on the four sides of the stadium were torn down one at a time, as the Turkish Super League seasons progressed, and the entire renewal and construction project was finalised in 2006, with the efforts of Fenerbahçe president Aziz Yıldırım and the team's board of directors.

== Identity ==
=== Crest, kits and colours ===
Fenerbahçe's first jersey (yellow-white striped) used in the 1906–07 season
Fenerbahçe changed their colours to yellow and navy blue in 1908

The first version of the logo in 1914. After the Turkish language was Latinized as a result of the Turkish Alphabet Reform in 1928, this logo was revised to its current formation

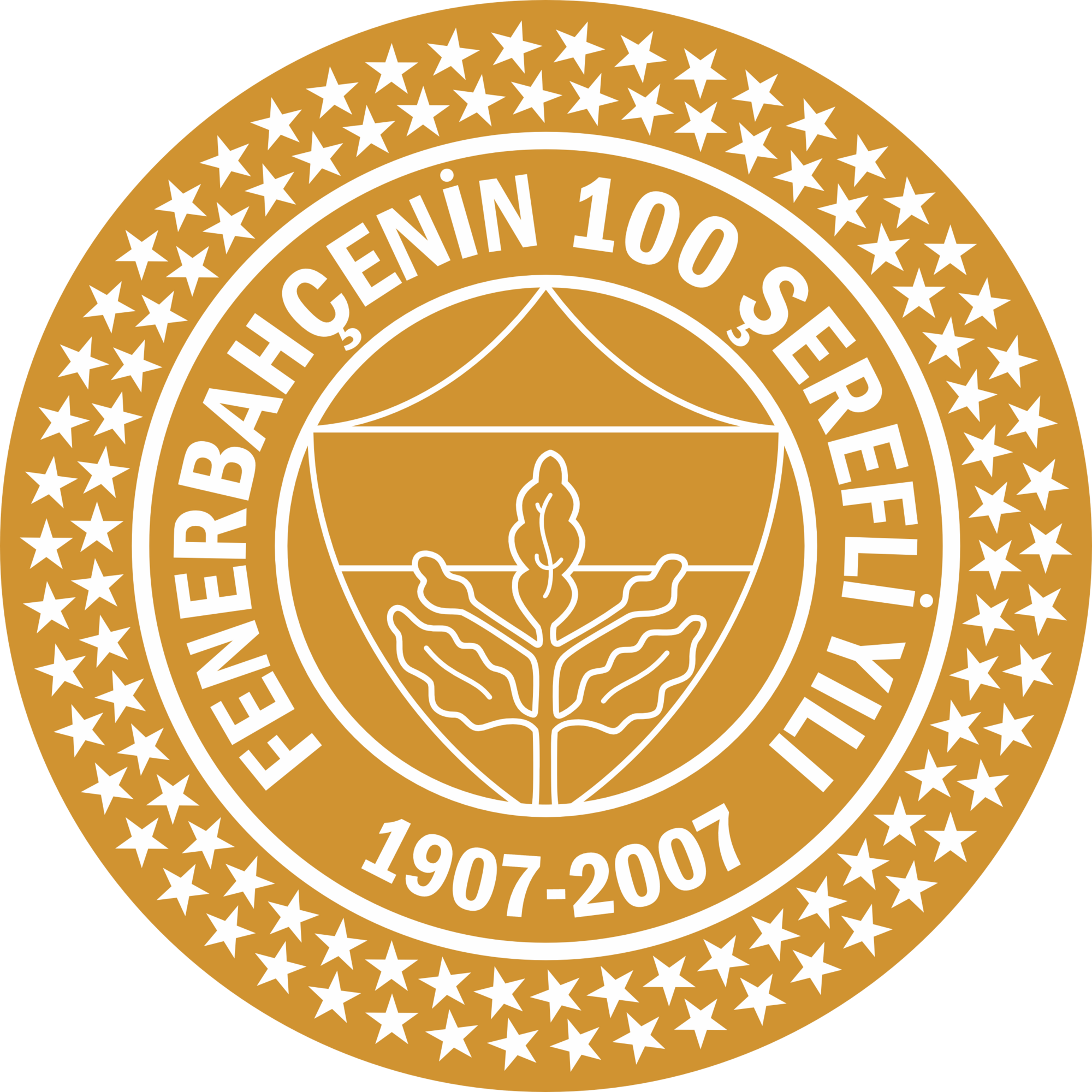
The 100-star crest created for Fenerbahçe's 100th anniversary

Fenerbahçe's first coat of arms was the famous Fenerbahçe Lighthouse, which gave its name to the Fenerbahçe area in Istanbul's Kadıköy district and was built by Emperor Suleiman the Magnificent in 1562, but the club, which was restructured in 1911, revised its identity and updated its crest of club in 1914 year. It was designed by Hikmet Topuzer, nicknamed Topuz Hikmet, who played as a right winger, in 1914 and had made as lapel pins by Tevfik Haccar Taşçı in London. The crest consists of five colours. The white section which includes the writing Fenerbahçe Spor Kulübü ★ 1907 ★ represents purity and open-heartedness, the red section represents love and attachment to the club and symbolises the Turkish flag. The yellow section symbolises other ones' envy and jealousy about Fenerbahçe, while the navy symbolises nobility. The oak leaf which rises from the navy and yellow section shows the force and the power of being a member of Fenerbahçe. The green colour of the leaf shows that the success of Fenerbahçe is imperative.

Since Fenerbahçe was founded in the spring, the club's colors were chosen as yellow and white, inspired by the yellow and white daisies blooming in the meadows of the Fenerbahçe district. The founding-president of the club, Nurizade Ziya Bey, designed Fenerbahçe's first jerseys; he purchased sports products from the store of the famous merchant of the time, Frank Sugg, located on Lord Street in Liverpool, England, where he spent his education between 1903 and 1906 and was introduced to the sport of football during these periods. Fenerbahçe's first jerseys that came from England were made of flannel fabric, long-sleeved and winter. The jerseys were causing problems for the players as the weather got hotter in the following days. For this reason, the club's president, Nurizade Ziya Bey, went to the shop of the British merchant Baker in the Tünel district of Beyoğlu in 1908 to order summer jerseys for the team. Baker said that the jerseys to be ordered will not be available in time for the summer. Thereupon, he offered to give the yellow-navy blue striped summer shirts he had on hand. Nurizade Ziya Bey, who accepted the offer due to the lack of places where other sports products were sold in Istanbul and the summer heat, bought all the jerseys and decided that the team's colors would be yellow-navy blue And with this decision taken in 1908, Fenerbahçe's future colors were determined.

The club badge for the 2023–24 season contains five stars to represent 28 championships as an act of protest against the TFF's lack of recognition of the club's pre-1959 titles. However, the Federation has not allowed Fenerbahçe to display the badge in league matches.

The cover of the Ottoman sports magazine İdman, with original color tones of Fenerbahçe (28 June 1913)

=== Shirt sponsors and manufacturers ===
Period	Kit manufacturers	Shirt sponsors
1977–1978	Admiral	Pereja / Şekerbank
1978–1980	—	—
1980–1982	—	Banker Kastelli
1982–1983	—	Hisar Bank
1983–1984	—	İstanbul Bankası
1984–1985	Adidas	Türk Bank
1985–1987	Güner	Türk Bank
1987–1988	Güner	Tamek
1988–1989	Adidas	Emlak Bankası
1989–1996	Adidas	Emlak Bankası
1996–1997	Adidas	VakıfBank
1997–1998	Adidas	Emlak Bankası
1998–1999	Adidas	Rifle / Proton 5x5
1999–2000	Adidas	Proton 5x5
2000–2001	Fenerium	Telsim
2001–2004	Fenerium	Aria
2004–2012	Adidas	Avea
2012–2014	Adidas	Türk Telekom
2014–2015	Adidas	—
2015–2016	Adidas	Yandex / Turkish Airlines^{1}
2016–2017	Adidas	Nesine.com / Borajet Airlines^{1}
2017–2018	Adidas	Acıbadem / Borajet Airlines^{1}
2018–2021	Adidas	Avis
2021–2023	Puma	Avis
2023–2025	Puma	Otokoç
2025–	Adidas	Otokoç / Chobani^{1}

^{1} European Shirt sponsor

== Dispute ==
=== Pre–1959 (league) championships dispute ===
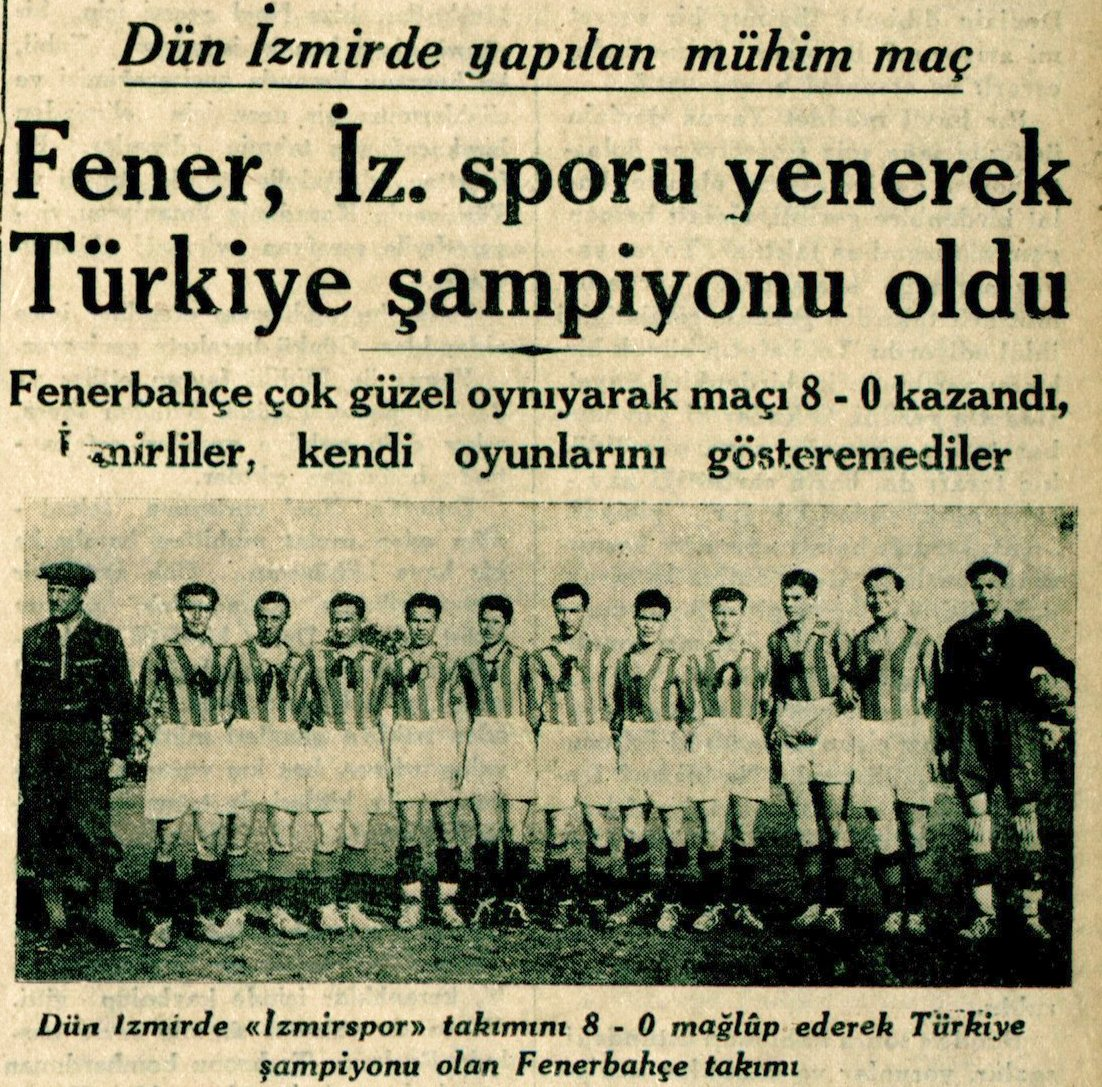
Turkish daily newspaper Cumhuriyet announcing the Turkish championship (Türkiye Şampiyonu) title of Fenerbahçe in November 1933

Before the Süper Lig was founded in 1959, there were other national championship competitions in Turkey, such as the Turkish Football Championship (1924–1951) and the Turkish National Division (1937–1950). These were the highest-ranking national championships of the Turkish Football Federation (TFF) at the time, and Fenerbahçe believes that its domestic championship titles from these official TFF championship competitions should be officially recognised and counted towards the awarding of championship stars (28 championship titles) and also for the championships history bonus from the Süper Lig broadcasting rights.

In the spring of 2002, Beşiktaş's two cup victories (1956–57, 1957–58) in the 'Turkish Federation Cup' prior to 1959, following a request by Beşiktaş, the TFF Arbitration Committee (TFF Tahkim Kurulu) – without a championship commission – ruled that these two past cup victories should be retrospectively recognised as Turkish top-flight league championship titles and equated with the Süper Lig championship titles (double standards), meaning they are also counted towards the awarding of championship stars and the championships history bonus from the Süper Lig broadcasting rights.

According to historians' analyses between 2021 and 2023 of the 2002 TFF Arbitration Board decision, which stated that the Turkish League Championships began before 1959 and the championships before 1959 cannot be left uncounted.

Fenerbahçe's domestic championship successes are listed as follows in the Turkish Football Federation's online magazine: three times Türkiye Futbol Birinciliği (1924–1951), six times Millî Küme (1937–1950) and 19 times Türkiye Ligi (1959–...). In effect, Fenerbahçe has won 28 national championship titles in its club history since the TFF was founded, of which only 19 league championship titles are counted by the TFF for the awarding of the championship star and for the championships history bonus from the Süper Lig broadcasting rights.

In March 2021, Fenerbahçe officially applied to the TFF for recognition of its nine national championship titles prior to 1959 as 'National League Championships', that these possess the same legitimacy as Süper Lig titles, and to have the 28 national championship titles officially registered for the awarding of the championship star and to receive a higher championships history bonus from the Süper Lig broadcasting rights; similar to Beşiktaş.

In April 2021, the headmaster of Galatasaray High School, Vahdettin Engin, as a historian, does not think it is right to ignore the championships before 1959 and only accept the championships from 1959 onwards. Even Ali Sami Yen, the founder of Istanbul's arch-rivals Galatasaray and later the first head coach of the Turkey national football team, refers to the national championships won by Fenerbahçe in the period prior to 1941 as "Turkish championships" in his 1941 memoirs.

In July 2023, the TFF decided to establish a championship commission to make a decision. However, the following months and years, the TFF was still unable to establish a commission. According to a Turkish historian, the actions of the TFF appear to be a delaying tactic to avoid making a decision.

Fenerbahçe, both as a listed company (Fenerbahçe Futbol A.Ş.) and as a sports club (Fenerbahçe S.K.), filed a lawsuit against Turkey (Turkish Football Federation) at the European Court of Human Rights in October 2023. As a result, the European Court of Human Rights initiated preliminary proceedings against Turkey (Turkish Football Federation) in March 2025. According to the initial assessment of a Turkish lawyer, Fenerbahçe's rights have been violated (Right to property of championship titles and Right to a fair trial); furthermore, Fenerbahçe complained of unequal treatment compared with other clubs and is also demanding compensation.

On 30 January 2026, UEFA published a in-depth look at the 2025–26 UEFA Europa League knockout phase contenders, saying that "Sarı Kanaryalar (The Yellow Canaries) have won a record 28 domestic titles in Türkiye".

=== Five-Star Dispute ===
As part of this effort, Fenerbahçe has announced its decision to add five stars above its club emblem, symbolizing what it considers 28 national championships. According to the TFF’s official star system, clubs receive one star for every five Süper Lig titles, meaning Fenerbahçe currently has three stars for its 19 officially recognized league wins. However, if its pre–1959 championships were recognized, Fenerbahçe would qualify for five stars.

Despite TFF not approving this claim, Fenerbahçe has unilaterally decided to use the five-star emblem on its jerseys, branding, and club identity. The club made this announcement after a meeting of its High Council Board, stating that it will not wait for TFF’s approval and will proceed with its own recognition of historical achievements. This move has sparked intense debate within Turkish football, as it challenges the federation's star system and could set a precedent for other clubs seeking recognition for their pre-1959 titles. This dispute continues to be a major topic in Turkish football, with potential legal and historical implications that could reshape the country's championship records.

=== Fenerbahçe to Play Without Stars on Jersey ===
Fenerbahçe President Ali Koç announced during the Ordinary High Council Board Meeting that the club will temporarily remove the stars from its jerseys for upcoming matches. This decision was taken after the Turkish Football Federation attempted to set up a championship committee to review the recognition of championships from before 1959.

Koç stated that Fenerbahçe respects the process and will wait for the commission's findings. Until a final ruling is made, the club will play without any stars on its jerseys.

== Honours ==
=== Domestic competitions ===
Turkish football championships: 28 titles (all-time record)

- Süper Lig (since 1959)

Winners (19): 1959, 1960–61, 1963–64, 1964–65, 1967–68, 1969–70, 1973–74, 1974–75, 1977–78, 1982–83, 1984–85, 1988–89, 1995–96, 2000–01, 2003–04, 2004–05, 2006–07, 2010–11, 2013–14
Runners-up (27): 1959–60, 1961–62, 1966–67, 1970–71, 1972–73, 1975–76, 1976–77, 1979–80, 1983–84, 1989–90, 1991–92, 1993–94, 1997–98, 2001–02, 2005–06, 2007–08, 2009–10, 2011–12, 2012–13, 2014–15, 2015–16, 2017–18, 2021–22, 2022–23, 2023–24, 2024–25, 2025–26

- Turkish National Division (1937–1950)

Winners (6) (record): 1937, 1940, 1943, 1945, 1946, 1950
Runners-up (2): 1944, 1947

- Turkish Football Championship (1924–1951)

Winners (3) (shared-record): 1933, 1935, 1944
Runners-up (2): 1940, 1947

National cups (27)

- Turkish Cup

Winners (7): 1967–68, 1973–74, 1978–79, 1982–83, 2011–12, 2012–13, 2022–23
Runners-up (11): 1962–63, 1964–65, 1988–89, 1995–96, 2000–01, 2004–05, 2005–06, 2008–09, 2009–10, 2015–16, 2017–18

- Turkish Super Cup

Winners (10): 1968, 1973, 1975, 1984, 1985, 1990, 2007, 2009, 2014, 2025
Runners-up (10): 1970, 1974, 1978, 1979, 1983, 1989, 1996, 2012, 2013, 2023

- Prime Minister's Cup

Winners (8) (record): 1945, 1946, 1950, 1973, 1980, 1989, 1993, 1998
Runners-up (7): 1944, 1971, 1976, 1977, 1992, 1994, 1995

- Atatürk Cup

Winners (1) (shared-record): 1998

- Spor Toto Cup

Winners (1): 1967

=== Regional competitions ===
- Istanbul Football League

Winners (16) (record): 1911–12, 1913–14, 1914–15, 1920–21, 1922–23, 1929–30, 1932–33, 1934–35, 1935–36, 1936–37, 1943–44, 1946–47, 1947–48, 1952–53, 1956–57, 1958–59
Runners-up (18): 1915–16, 1917–18, 1921–22, 1925–26, 1926–27, 1928–29, 1930–31, 1933–34, 1937–38, 1938–39, 1939–40, 1940–41, 1942–43, 1944–45, 1945–46, 1949–50, 1955–56, 1957–58

- Istanbul Football Cup

Winners (1): 1944–45
Runners-up (2): 1941–42, 1943–44

- Istanbul Shield

Winners (4) (record): 1929–30, 1933–34, 1937–38, 1938–39
Runners-up (1): 1932–33

=== International competitions ===
- Balkans Cup

Winners (1): 1966–67

== Records and statistics ==
Fenerbahçe set a world record in the 1922–23 season by winning the championship without conceding a single goal. In 1959, they became the first champion of the Turkish First Football League, which was organized for the first time that year. Fenerbahçe also holds an international milestone, winning the Balkans Cup in 1968. In the 1969–70 season, Fenerbahçe conceded only 6 goals, a record for the fewest goals conceded in a single season, which still stands today. In the 1988–89 season, Fenerbahçe scored 103 goals in 36 matches, achieving an average of 2.86 goals per game, the highest goal average in a single season.

Müjdat Yetkiner, who played for Fenerbahçe between 1975 and 1980, holds the record for the most appearances for the club, with 570 matches. Zeki Rıza Sporel, who played between 1915 and 1934, scored 470 goals in 353 matches, making him the all-time top scorer for Fenerbahçe. In the history of the Turkish First Football League, Aykut Kocaman holds the record for the most goals scored in the league while wearing a Fenerbahçe jersey, netting 140 goals in 212 matches. In the 1992–93 season, during Fenerbahçe's 7–1 victory over Karşıyaka, Tanju Çolak set the record for the most goals scored in a single match in the Turkish First Football League by scoring six goals.

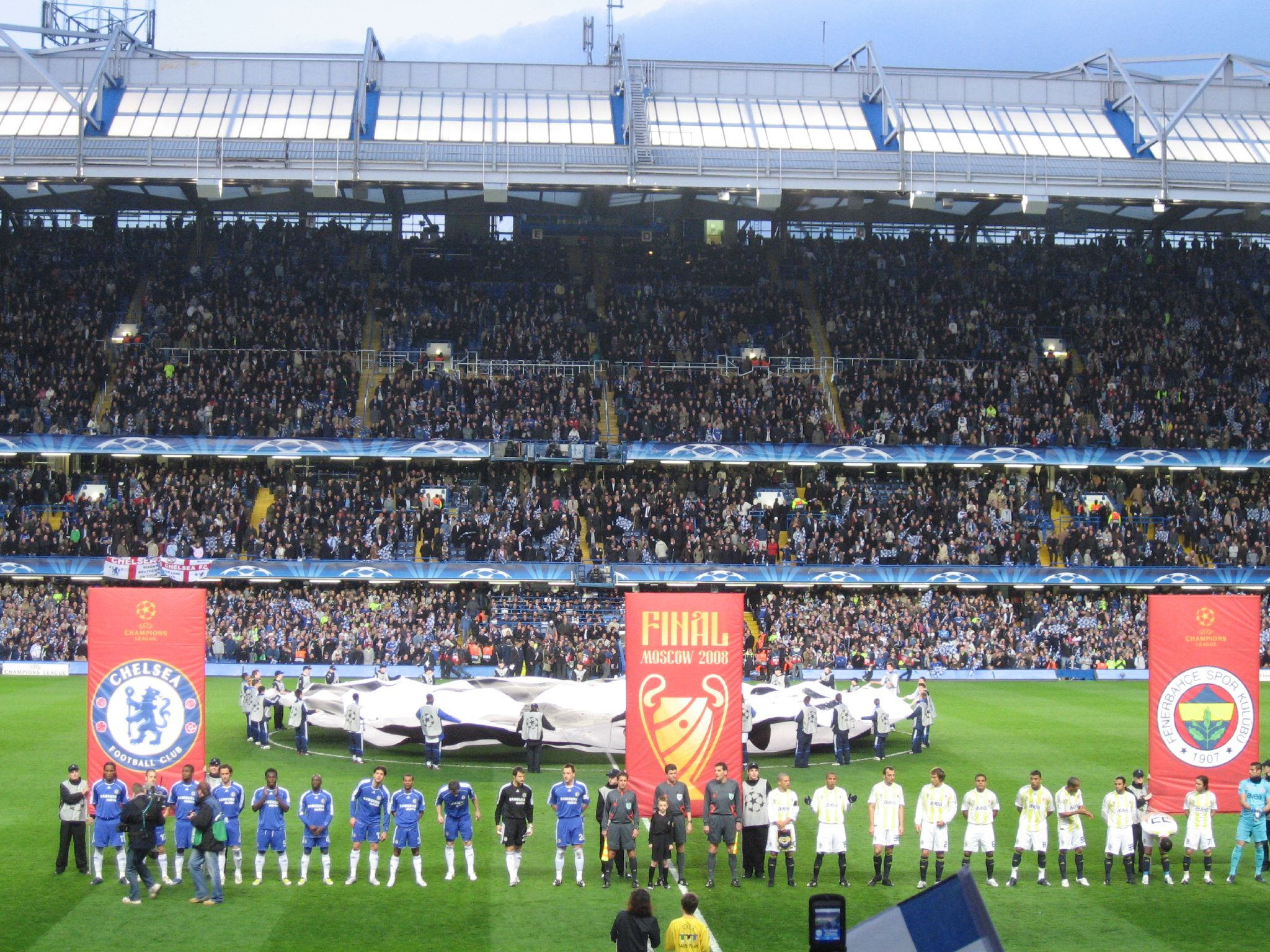
Fenerbahçe against Chelsea in the second leg of the 2007–08 UEFA Champions League quarter-finals, which they lost 2–0

Fenerbahçe has a storied history in European football, achieving several significant milestones. In the 2007–08 UEFA Champions League, they reached the quarter-finals for the first time, becoming the second Turkish club after Galatasaray to do so. In the quarter-final stage, Fenerbahçe faced Chelsea. In the first leg at the Şükrü Saracoğlu Stadium in Istanbul, Fenerbahçe secured a 2–1 victory. However, in the return leg at Stamford Bridge in London, Chelsea won 2–0, resulting in a 3–2 aggregate loss for Fenerbahçe, ending their historic run in the competition. In the 2012–13 UEFA Europa League, Fenerbahçe advanced to the semi-finals, marking their deepest run in European competitions to date. They faced Benfica in the semi-final. In the first leg in Istanbul, Fenerbahçe won 1–0. However, in the second leg at the Estádio da Luz in Lisbon, Benfica triumphed 3–1, leading to a 3–2 aggregate defeat for Fenerbahçe, thus halting their progress to the final. In the 2022–23 UEFA Europa Conference League, Fenerbahçe reached the quarter-finals. They faced Olympiacos in the quarter-final stage. In the first leg in Piraeus, Olympiacos secured a 3–2 victory. In the return leg in Istanbul, Fenerbahçe won 1–0, leveling the aggregate score at 3–3. The match proceeded to a penalty shootout, where Fenerbahçe was eliminated after a 4–2 loss in penalties. These European campaigns have solidified Fenerbahçe's reputation as a competitive force in international football, showcasing their ability to contend with some of Europe's elite clubs.

Since their inception, Fenerbahçe has completed over a century of seasons, with the vast majority played in the highest division of Turkish football, known today as the Süper Lig. They are the longest-serving club in the league and have played continuously in the Turkish top flight since its establishment in 1959. Fenerbahçe has won twenty-eight national championships across different eras of Turkish football, finishing first more frequently than any other team. Having finished second in numerous league campaigns, Fenerbahçe has consistently ranked among the top clubs in Turkish football history. Their lowest-ever league finish remains a rare occurrence, with the club being a dominant force for over a century.

== Players ==
=== Current squad ===
As of 10 September 2026

Note: Flags indicate national team as defined under FIFA eligibility rules; some limited exceptions apply. Players may hold more than one non-FIFA nationality.

No.	Pos.	Nation	Player
3	DF	ENG	Archie Brown
5	MF	TUR	İsmail Yüksek
6	MF	FRA	Mattéo Guendouzi
7	FW	TUR	Kerem Aktürkoğlu
8	MF	TUR	Mert Hakan Yandaş
9	FW	BEL	Romelu Lukaku
10	MF	ESP	Marco Asensio
11	FW	ENG	Mason Greenwood
13	GK	TUR	Tarık Çetin
14	DF	TUR	Yiğit Demir
15	DF	NED	Nathan Aké
17	MF	TUR	İrfan Kahveci
18	DF	TUR	Mert Müldür
19	FW	KOS	Vedat Muriqi

No.	Pos.	Nation	Player
21	DF	GHA	Kojo Peprah Oppong
22	DF	TUR	Levent Mercan
24	DF	NED	Jayden Oosterwolde (*)
27	DF	POR	Nélson Semedo
28	MF	TUR	Bartuğ Elmaz
30	FW	SEN	Amara Diouf (*)
31	GK	BRA	Ederson
34	GK	TUR	Mert Günok
37	DF	SVK	Milan Škriniar (captain)
45	FW	MLI	Dorgeles Nene
70	FW	TUR	Oğuz Aydın
77	DF	SRB	Ognjen Mimović
91	MF	FRA	N'Golo Kanté

(*) Eligible for Turkish Cup and Turkish Super Cup

=== Out on loan ===
Note: Flags indicate national team as defined under FIFA eligibility rules; some limited exceptions apply. Players may hold more than one non-FIFA nationality.

No.	Pos.	Nation	Player
—	DF	TUR	Yiğit Fidan (at Muğlaspor until 30 June 2027)
—	DF	BRA	Rodrigo Becão (at Rodina Moscow until 30 June 2027)
—	DF	BRA	Diego Carlos (at Parma until 30 June 2027)
—	DF	TUR	Kamil Üregen (at Serikspor until 30 June 2027)

No.	Pos.	Nation	Player
—	FW	COD	Anthony Musaba (at Norwich City until 30 June 2027)
—	FW	TUR	Çağrı Fedai (at Kütahyaspor until 30 June 2027)
—	FW	TUR	Adem Yeşilyurt (at Kütahyaspor until 30 June 2027)

=== Academy players in senior squad ===
The following players have previously made appearances or have appeared on the substitutes bench for the first team.

Note: Flags indicate national team as defined under FIFA eligibility rules; some limited exceptions apply. Players may hold more than one non-FIFA nationality.

No.	Pos.	Nation	Player
54	FW	TUR	Alaettin Ekici
75	GK	TUR	Kuzey Sapaz
78	DF	TUR	Çağan Sarıdikmen
79	DF	TUR	Ercüment Sancaklı
80	MF	TUR	Adnan Efe Fettahoğlu
82	DF	TUR	Yağız Bedirhan Korkmaz
83	MF	TUR	Yasir Boz

No.	Pos.	Nation	Player
84	MF	TUR	Emin Eren Sayar
85	MF	TUR	Güner Ekici
86	DF	TUR	Gökmen Özdemir
89	GK	TUR	Yasir Caklı
90	MF	TUR	Emirhan Ateş
99	FW	TUR	Çağrı Balta

=== Unregistered players ===
Note: Flags indicate national team as defined under FIFA eligibility rules; some limited exceptions apply. Players may hold more than one non-FIFA nationality.

No. / Pos. / Nation / Player; — / MF / SEN / Aziz Fall	No. / Pos. / Nation / Player; — / MF / GHA / Daniel Amoh

=== Retired number(s) ===
- Number 12 is reserved for the fans (often referred to as the 12th man)

== Recent seasons ==
Results										Domestic		Continental			Top Scorer(s)		Ref.
Season	League	Pos.	Pld	W	D	L	GF	GA	Pts	TC	SC	UCL	UEL	UECL	Player(s)	Goals	Ref.
2016–17	Süper Lig	3rd	34	18	10	6	60	32	64	SF	–	3QR	R32	–	Moussa Sow	15	
2017–18	Süper Lig	2nd	34	21	9	4	78	36	72	RU	–		POR	–	Giuliano	15	
2018–19	Süper Lig	6th	34	11	13	10	44	44	46	R16	–	3QR	R32	–	Roberto Soldado	7	
2019–20	Süper Lig	7th	34	15	8	11	58	46	53	SF	–				Vedat Muriqi	17	
2020–21	Süper Lig	3rd	40	25	7	8	72	41	82	SF	–				Enner Valencia	13	
2021–22	Süper Lig	2nd	38	21	10	7	73	38	73	R16	–		GS	KPO	Serdar Dursun	15	
2022–23	Süper Lig	2nd	36	25	5	6	87	42	80	W	–	2QR	R16	–	Enner Valencia	33	
2023–24	Süper Lig	2nd	38	31	6	1	99	31	99	QF	F ~~(Note: Fenerbahçe fielded their U19 team and left the pitch in protest, resulting in a 3–0 forfeit loss.)~~	–		QF	Edin Džeko	25	
2024–25	Süper Lig	2nd	36	26	6	4	90	39	84	QF	–	3QR	R16	–	Youssef En-Nesyri	30	
2025–26	Süper Lig	2nd	34	21	11	2	77	37	74	QF	W	POR	KPO	–	Talisca	27	

== Club officials ==
=== Board members ===
Position	Name
President	(Turkey) Aziz Yıldırım
Vice President	(Turkey) Barış Göktürk
Vice President	(Turkey) Nihat Özbağı
General Secretary	(Turkey) Mahmut Uslu
Board Member	(Turkey) Mehmet Selim Kosif
Board Member	(Turkey) Mustafa Çağlar
Board Member	(Turkey) Ahmet Önder Fırat
Board Member	(Turkey) Cihan Kamer
Board Member	(Turkey) Fatih Öztürk
Board Member	(Turkey) Batuhan Özdemir
Board Member	(Turkey) Tanju Kaya
Board Member	(Turkey) Ahmet Murat İman
Board Member	(Turkey) Özgür Peker
Board Member	(Turkey) Yusuf Buğra Tanık
Board Member	(Turkey) Mehmet Aydın
Substitute Member	(Turkey) Fatih Aslan
Substitute Member	(Turkey) Volkan Akan
Substitute Member	(Turkey) Mustafa Aydın Acun
Substitute Member	(Turkey) Barış Karagöz
Substitute Member	(Turkey) Yasemin Babayiğit
Substitute Member	(Turkey) Savaş Adalet
Substitute Member	(Turkey) Demre İşçen

=== Technical staff ===
Position	Name
Head of football operations	(Turkey) Cihan Kamer
Director of football	(Turkey) Oğuz Çetin
Head coach	(Turkey) Emre Belözoğlu
Assistant coach	(Turkey) İlker Püren
Assistant coach	(Turkey) Caner Erol
Assistant coach	(Turkey) (France) Hakan Özmert
Assistant coach	(Spain) Adrián Iglesias Fernández
Goalkeeping coach	(Turkey) Özden Öngün
Goalkeeping coach	(Turkey) Eray Birniçan
Performance coach	(Turkey) Prof. Dr. Osman Ateş
Performance coach	(Turkey) Bumin Kağan Yıldız
Performance coach	(Turkey) Ekrem Özerk Tufan
Match analyst	(Turkey) Furkan Berk Yüksek
Match analyst	(Turkey) Kazım Çetin
Match analyst	(Turkey) Serdar Keşçi
Scout	(Turkey) (Germany) Toprak Kırtoğlu
Scout	(Turkey) Serkan Görgeç
Media officer	(Turkey) Mustafa Sapmaz
Interpreter	(Turkey) Sinan Levi
Interpreter	(Turkey) Saruhan Karaman
Doctor	(Turkey) Prof. Dr. Ömer Taşer
Doctor	(Turkey) Op. Dr. Halil Polat
Doctor	(Turkey) Dr. Oğuzhan Gökçay
Physiotherapist	(Turkey) Umut Şahin
Physiotherapist	(Turkey) Ata Özgür Ercan
Physiotherapist	(Turkey) Melih Bayır
Physiotherapist	(Turkey) Rıza Özdemir
Dietician	(Turkey) Cenk Özyılmaz
Masseur	(Turkey) Özkan Alaca
Masseur	(Turkey) Veysel Çabşek
Masseur	(Turkey) Eyüp Emre Yeşiller
Masseur	(Turkey) Selçuk Açarol
Material manager	(Turkey) Dursun Çetin
Material manager	(Turkey) Erdal Kurt
Material manager	(Turkey) Rıfat Bayraklı

=== Notable Coaches ===
Fenerbahçe managers to have won major honours. Trophies in italics are regional competitions that were held before the establishment of national leagues and cups.

Name	Tenure	Honours
(Ottoman Empire) Galip Kulaksızoğlu	1910–15	Istanbul Football League (3)
(Turkey) Necmettin Çakar	1929–32	Istanbul Football League, Istanbul Shield
(Hungary) József Schweng	1932–34	Turkish Football Championship, Istanbul Football League, Istanbul Shield
(United Kingdom) Jimmy Elliott	1934–37	National Division, Turkish Football Championship (2), Istanbul Football League, Istanbul Shield
(Hungary) József Schweng	1937–39	Istanbul Shield (2)
(Hungary) Sándor Nemes	1939–40	National Division
(England) John Prayer	1941–44	National Division, Turkish Football Championship, Istanbul Football League
(Greece) Mitsos Dimitropoulos	1944–45	Istanbul Football League
(Turkey) Fikret Arıcan	1945–47	National Division, Prime Minister's Cup, Istanbul Football League
(England) Peter Molloy	1949–51	National Division, Prime Minister's Cup
(Hungary) László Székely	1951–53	Istanbul Football League (2), Süper Lig
(Hungary) László Székely	1960–62	Istanbul Football League (2), Süper Lig
(Hungary) Ignáce Molnár	1957–60	Istanbul Football League, Süper Lig, Turkish Cup, Turkish Super Cup
(Hungary) Ignáce Molnár	1967–69	Istanbul Football League, Süper Lig, Turkish Cup, Turkish Super Cup
(Socialist Federal Republic of Yugoslavia) Mirko Kokotović	1962–64	Süper Lig
(England) Oscar Hold	1964–65	Süper Lig
(Socialist Federal Republic of Yugoslavia) Abdulah Gegić	1966-67	Balkan Cup, Spor Toto Cup
(Romania) Traian Ionescu	1969–70	Süper Lig
(Brazil) Didi	1972–75	Süper Lig (2), Turkish Cup, Turkish Super Cup (2), Prime Minister's Cup
(Socialist Federal Republic of Yugoslavia) T. Kaloperović	1976–78	Süper Lig
(Turkey) Necdet Niş	1978–79	Turkish Cup
(Turkey) Ziya Şengül	1979–80	Prime Minister's Cup
(Socialist Federal Republic of Yugoslavia) Branko Stanković	1982–84	Süper Lig, Turkish Cup
(Socialist Federal Republic of Yugoslavia) Todor Veselinović	1984–85	Süper Lig (2), Prime Minister's Cup (3)
(Socialist Federal Republic of Yugoslavia) Todor Veselinović	1988–90	Süper Lig (2), Prime Minister's Cup (3)
(Turkey) Ömer Kaner	1984–85	Prime Minister's Cup
(Germany) Holger Osieck	1993–94	Prime Minister's Cup
(Brazil) Parreira	1995–96	Süper Lig
(Croatia) Otto Barić	1997–98	Prime Minister's Cup
(Turkey) Mustafa Denizli	2000–01	Süper Lig
(Germany) Christoph Daum	2003–06	Süper Lig (2), Turkish Super Cup
(Germany) Christoph Daum	2009–10	Süper Lig (2), Turkish Super Cup
(Brazil) Zico	2006–08	Süper Lig, Turkish Super Cup
(Turkey) Aykut Kocaman	2010–13	Süper Lig, Turkish Cup (2)
(Turkey) Ersun Yanal	2013–14	Süper Lig
(Turkey) İsmail Kartal	2014–15	Turkish Super Cup
(Portugal) Jorge Jesus	2022–23	Turkish Cup
(Italy) Domenico Tedesco	2025–26	Turkish Super Cup

== See also ==
- Fenerbahçe S.K.
- Fenerbahçe S.K. (women's football)
- Süper Lig
- List of unrelegated association football clubs

== Sources ==
- Yüce, Mehmet (2014). Osmanlı Melekleri: Futbol Tarihimizin Kadim Devreleri Türkiye Futbol Tarihi – Birinci Cilt (in Turkish). Istanbul: İletişim Yayınları. ISBN 9789750515804.
- Yüce, Mehmet (2015). İdmancı Ruhlar: Futbol Tarihimizin Klasik Devreleri: 1923–1952 Türkiye Futbol Tarihi – 2. Cilt (in Turkish). Istanbul: İletişim Yayınları. ISBN 9789750516955.
