= Galip Kulaksızoğlu =

Turkish footballer and manager

Galip Kulaksızoğlu (1889 – 22 November 1939) was a Turkish footballer and manager. He was among the founding line-up of the Turkish football club Fenerbahçe. He served the club for 17 years both as a player and manager. He was known for his sportsmanship and passion for the game.

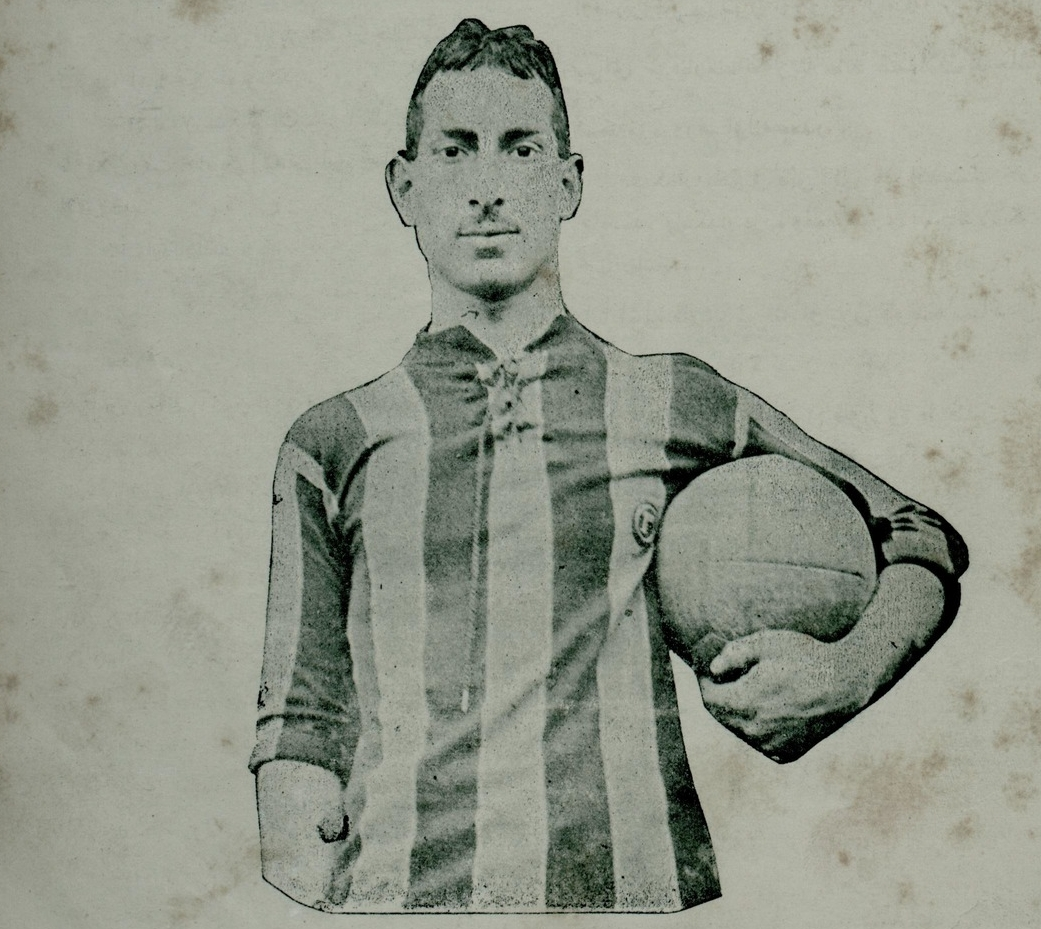
Galip Kulaksızoğlu, 1914

== Career ==
Kulaksızoğlu was born in 1889 in the Kadıköy district of Istanbul, the capital of the Ottoman Empire. Around 1906–07, while he was studying at Istanbul Lycée Saint-Joseph, which is still an active school in Kadıköy, he joined the Fenerbahçe football team with the suggestion of Enver Yetiker (he is one of the founding members of Fenerbahçe), his literature teacher at the school. Galip Kulaksızoğlu, who rejected intense transfer offers from the English and Greek football teams in the country in 1911, when Fenerbahçe did not yet have a league championship, was one of the football players who made a great contribution to the team in the 1911–12 season, when Fenerbahçe won its first league championship undefeated.

No harm! This year we will be 5th again, but of course we will have the strength to defeat all the opponents one day.

— Galip Kulaksızoğlu

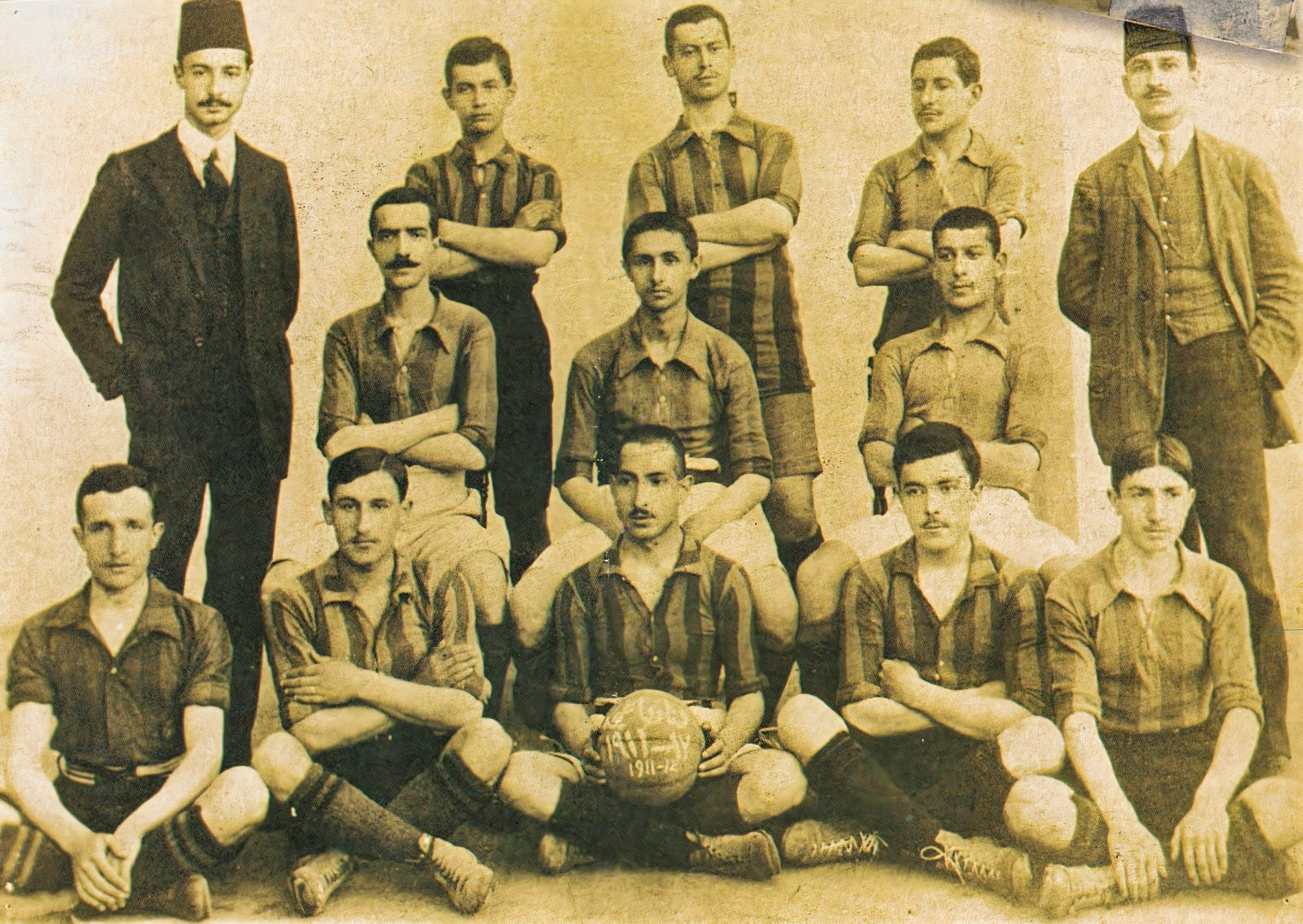
Fenerbahçe squad of 1910. Galip Kulaksızoğlu is the one keep the ball

Kulaksızoğlu, the 2nd team captain of the Fenerbahçe football team in history, scored 73 goals in a total of 216 matches in the 17 years from 1907 until 1924, when he left football. He started football as an offensive player and briefly moved to the defense position, where he continued his football career.
