= Müjdat Yetkiner =

Turkish footballer (born 1961)

Personal information
- Date of birth: 16 November 1961 (age 64)
- Place of birth: Istanbul, Turkey
- Positions: Defender; midfielder

Senior career*
Years	Team	Apps	(Gls)
1980–1995	Fenerbahçe	429	(23)

International career
1979–1980	Turkey U18	6	(0)
1980–1983	Turkey U21	10	(0)
1986–1994	Turkey	26	(0)
- * Club domestic league appearances and goals

Müjdat Yetkiner (born 16 November 1961) is a former professional footballer who played as a defender or midfielder. He is the most capped Turkish player in the history of Fenerbahçe with 763 caps. He played the positions of sweeper, defender, fullback, defensive midfielder, midfielder, winger and attacking midfielder. He also played as a forward several times. As a player, he was a favourite with fans.

== Career ==
Born in Istanbul, Yetkiner played for Fenerbahçe between 1980 and 1995, being capped 429 times in Turkish League history, scored 23 goals and winning the Turkish League title three times (1982–83, 1983–84 and 1988–89). He was shown 44 yellow and 5 red cards. He was called up to play for the Turkey national team 26 times at the professional level, 10 times for Turkey U21 and six times for Turkey U18. He continued his career as the manager of Fenerbahçe's youth team after he retired from football in 1995.

== Honours ==
- Turkish Football League: 1982–83, 1984–85, 1988–89
- Turkish Cup: 1982–83
- Presidents Cup: 1984, 1985, 1990
- Chancellor Cup: 1988–89, 1992–93
- TSYD Cup:1980–81, 1982–83, 1985–86, 1986–87, 1994–95
- Fleet Cup: 1982, 1983, 1984, 1985
