= Enver Yetiker =

Turkish educator

- Born: 1875; Istanbul, Ottoman Empire
- Died: 1955 (aged 79–80); Istanbul, Turkey

Enver Kemal Yetiker (1875 Kadıköy, Istanbul – 1955, Istanbul) was a Turkish educator at Saint Joseph's College. He was among the founding line-up of the Turkish football club Fenerbahçe.
