= 1922–23 Istanbul Football League =

İstanbul Football League
- Season: 1922–23
- Champions: Fenerbahçe (4th title)

The 1922–23 Istanbul Football League season was the 16th season of the league. Fenerbahçe won the league for the fourth time.

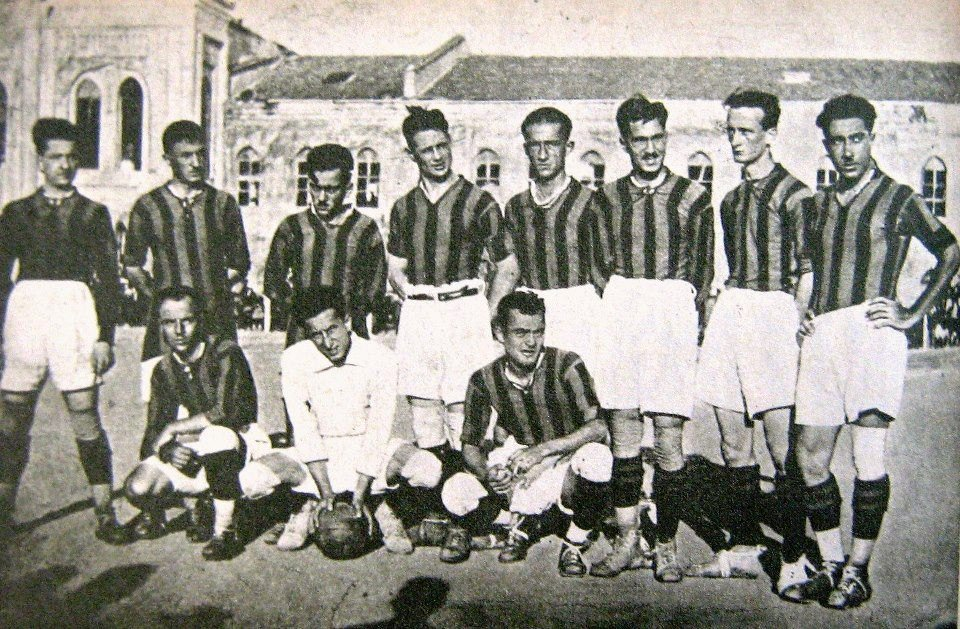
Istanbul Friday League - Fenerbahce SK 1922-23 Champion

== Season ==
Pos	Team	Pld	W	D	L	GF	GA	GD	Pts
1	Fenerbahçe SK	12	11	1	0	58	0	+58	23
2	Altınordu İdman Yurdu SK	10	8	1	1	17	1	+16	17
3	Galatasaray SK	10	4	1	5	12	16	−4	9
4	Küçükçekmece SK	9	4	0	5	9	30	−21	8
5	Hilal SK	11	2	4	5	11	23	−12	8
6	Üsküdar Anadolu SK	11	2	3	6	8	18	−10	7
7	Vefa SK	11	3	1	7	6	27	−21	7
8	Darüşşafaka SK	10	1	3	6	7	14	−7	5
