= List of Fenerbahçe S.K. records and statistics =

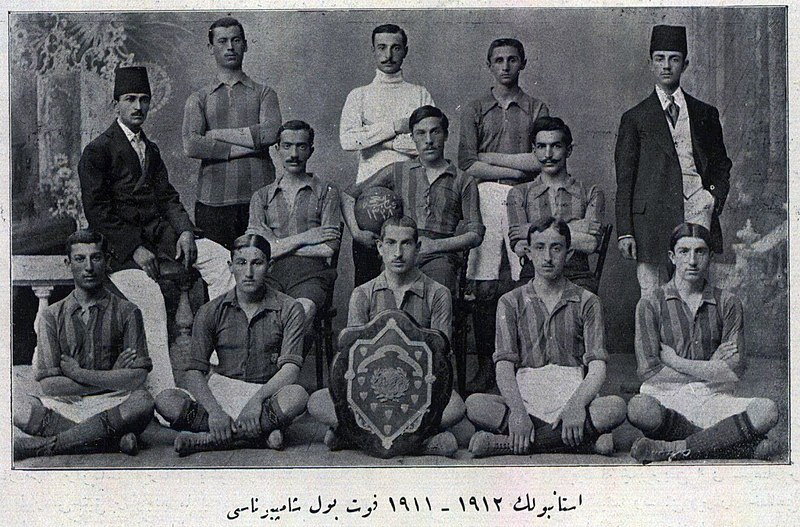
Fenerbahçe squad that won the 1911–12 Istanbul Football League

List of Fenerbahçe S.K. records and statistics contains the records and statistics of the footballers of Fenerbahçe.

== Honours ==
=== Domestic competitions ===
Turkish National championships: 28 titles (record)

- Turkish Super League

Winners (19): 1959, 1960–61, 1963–64, 1964–65, 1967–68, 1969–70, 1973–74, 1974–75, 1977–78, 1982–83, 1984–85, 1988–89, 1995–96, 2000–01, 2003–04, 2004–05, 2006–07, 2010–11, 2013–14
Runners-up (27): 1959–60, 1961–62, 1966–67, 1970–71, 1972–73, 1975–76, 1976–77, 1979–80, 1983–84, 1989–90, 1991–92, 1993–94, 1997–98, 2001–02, 2005–06, 2007–08, 2009–10, 2011–12, 2012–13, 2014–15, 2015–16, 2017–18, 2021–22, 2022–23, 2023–24, 2024–25, 2025–26

- Turkish National Division

Winners (6) (record): 1937, 1940, 1943, 1945, 1946, 1950
Runners-up (2): 1944, 1947

- Turkish Football Championship

Winners (3) (shared-record): 1933, 1935, 1944
Runners-up (2): 1940, 1947

National Cups

- Turkish Cup

Winners (7): 1967–68, 1973–74, 1978–79, 1982–83, 2011–12, 2012–13, 2022–23
Runners-up (11): 1962–63, 1964–65, 1988–89, 1995–96, 2000–01, 2004–05, 2005–06, 2008–09, 2009–10, 2015–16, 2017–18

- Turkish Super Cup

Winners (10): 1968, 1973, 1975, 1984, 1985, 1990, 2007, 2009, 2014, 2025
Runners-up (10): 1970, 1974, 1978, 1979, 1983, 1989, 1996, 2012, 2013, 2023

- Atatürk Cup

Winners (2) (record): 1964, 1998

- Prime Minister's Cup

Winners (8) (record): 1945, 1946, 1950, 1973, 1980, 1989, 1993, 1998
Runners-up (7): 1944, 1971, 1976, 1977, 1992, 1994, 1995

- Spor Toto Cup

Winners (1): 1967

=== European competitions ===
- Balkans Cup

Winners (1): 1966–67

=== Regional competitions ===
- Istanbul Football League

Winners (16) (record): 1911–12, 1913–14, 1914–15, 1920–21, 1922–23, 1929–30, 1932–33, 1934–35, 1935–36, 1936–37, 1943–44, 1946–47, 1947–48, 1952–53, 1956–57, 1958–59

- Istanbul Cup

Winners (1): 1945

- Istanbul Shield

Winners (4) (record): 1930, 1934, 1938, 1939

=== Others ===
- General Harrington Cup

Winners (1): 1923

- Fleet Cup

Winners (4) (record): 1982, 1983, 1984, 1985

- TSYD Cup

Winners (12) (shared-record): 1969, 1973, 1975, 1976, 1978, 1979, 1980, 1982, 1985, 1986, 1994, 1995

- TSYD Challenge Cup

Winners (2) (record): 1976, 1980

== Player records ==
=== Most appearances ===
All official and unofficial competitions are included in the list.
As of 30 May 2019

	Nat.	Name	Period	Goal	Booked	Sent off (straight red)	Match	Ref.
1	(Turkey)	Müjdat Yetkiner	1979–1996	27	64	11	570	
2	(Turkey)	Volkan Demirel	2002–2019	0	47	5	525	
3	(Turkey)	Cem Pamiroğlu	1976–1987	7	23	2	396	
4	(Turkey)	Şeref Has	1955–1969	87	0	3	382	
5	(Turkey)	Rüştü Reçber	1994–2003, 2004–2007	0	22	1	381	
6	(Turkey)	Gökhan Gönül	2007–2016, 2020-2021	14	53	4	361	
7	(Turkey)	Lefter Küçükandonyadis	1947–1951, 1953–1964	215	0	4	349	
8	(Turkey)	Ziya Şengül	1964–1976	21	1	1	342	
9	(Brazil)	Alex de Souza	2004–2013	171	52	3	341	
10	(Turkey)	Selçuk Şahin	2003–2015	20	63	3	326	

=== Top goalscorers ===
All official and unofficial competitions are included in the list.
As of 31 October 2016

	Nat.	Name	Period	Goal	Ref.
1	(Turkey)	Lefter Küçükandonyadis	1947–1951, 1953–1964	215	
2	(Turkey)	Melih Kotanca	1938–1948	172	
3	(Brazil)	Alex de Souza	2004–2013	171	
4	(Turkey)	Aykut Kocaman	1988–1996	167	
5	(Turkey)	Naci Bastoncu	1934–1947	162	
6	(Turkey)	Cemil Turan	1972–1981	127	
7	(Turkey)	Fikret Arıcan	1928–1947	109	
8	(Turkey)	Ogün Altıparmak	1963–1971	89	
9	(Turkey)	Şeref Has	1955–1969	89	
10	(Turkey)	Semih Şentürk	2000–2013	86	

== Managers ==
- First manager: Hüseyin Dalaklı, became the first manager in 1907.
- Manager who managed for the longest time: Ignace Molnar, 6 seasons.
- Manager who held the most title: Didi and Todor Veselinović, each has 8 titles.

== Club records ==
=== Goals ===
- Most goals scored in a season: 103 goals (1988–89 season)
- Least goals scored in a season: 31 goals (1969–70, 1976–77, 1979–80 seasons)
- Most goals conceded in a season: 53 goals (1990–91 season)
- Least goals conceded in a season: 6 goals (1969–70 season)

=== Points ===
- Most points in a season: 99 points (2023–24 season in 38 matches)
- Least points in a season: 29 points (1980–81 season in 30 matches)

=== Matches ===
==== First ====
- First Süper Lig match: Fenerbahçe 3–1 Ankaragücü (21 February 1959)
- First Turkish Cup match: Adana Demirspor 1–2 Fenerbahçe (30 September 1962)
- First european cup match: Fenerbahçe 1–1 Csepel SC (13 September 1959, European Champion Clubs' Cup)

==== Biggest wins ====
- Biggest Süper Lig win: 8–0 (against Eyüpspor) 8–1 (against Samsunspor and Kayserispor), 7–0 Denizlispor (2 times), Şekerspor, Kayserispor, Hacettepe and Kardemir Karabükspor)
- Biggest Turkish Cup win: 10–3 (against Alanyaspor 23 January 2008)
- Biggest European win: 5–0 (against Turan-Tovuz, UEFA Cup)

==== Heaviest defeats ====
- Heaviest Süper Lig defeats: 5–0 (against Galatasaray), 6–1 (against Aydınspor)
- Heaviest Turkish Cup defeats: 5–1 (against Galatasaray, Final)
- Heaviest European cup defeats: 7–0 (against Benfica, European Champion Clubs' Cup)
- Heaviest defeats: 10–1 (against Slavia Praha, friendly match)

== National records ==
- Fenerbahçe became champion in 1922–23 season without conceding even 1 goal.
- Became the first champion of Turkish Football League in 1959 which was the first season of the league.
- Won 5 titles in 1967–68 (League championship, Turkish Cup, TSYD, Prime Minister's Cup and Turkish Super Cup).
- Conceded only 6 goals in 1969–70 season.
- Team with the highest goal average in a season (1988-89 season, 103 goals in 36 matches).
- Team whose player is the top scorer in a match. (Tanju Çolak 6 goals, Fenerbahçe 7–1 Karşıyaka, 1992–93 season, week 14)

== European records ==
- Fenerbahçe is the first Turkish club team to win a European competition. By winning the Balkan Cup in the 1966–67 season.

=== Best achievements ===
As of 18 April 2024

Season	Achievement	Notes
UEFA Cup Winners' Cup
1963–64	Quarter-finalist	eliminated by (Hungary) MTK Budapest 0–2 in Budapest, 3–1 in Istanbul, 0–1 in Rome
Balkans Cup
1966–67	Champion	won against (Greece) AEK Athens 1–2 in Athens, 1–0 in Istanbul, 3–1 in Istanbul
UEFA Champions League
2007–08	Quarter-finalist	eliminated by (England) Chelsea 2–1 in Istanbul, 0–2 in London
UEFA Europa League
2012–13	Semi-finalist	eliminated by (Portugal) Benfica 1–0 in Istanbul, 1–3 in Lisbon
UEFA Europa Conference League
2023–24	Quarter-finalist	eliminated by (Greece) Olympiacos 2–3 in Piraeus, 1–0 in Istanbul (2–3 p)

=== Statistics ===
As of 13 March 2025

Competition	Pld	W	D	L	GF	GA	GD
UEFA Champions League	111	34	22	55	128	186	–58
UEFA Cup Winners' Cup	9	3	1	5	11	11	0
UEFA Europa League	148	64	38	46	208	187	+21
UEFA Europa Conference League	18	12	0	6	44	23	+21
Total	286	113	61	112	391	407	–16

Source: UEFA.com
Pld = Matches played; W = Matches won; D = Matches drawn; L = Matches lost; GF = Goals for; GA = Goals against; GD = Goal Difference.
