= List of Fenerbahçe S.K. honors =

The list of achievements, records and trophies won by the football department of Fenerbahçe. (Note: The list of achievements, records, and trophies won by Fenerbahçe since 1907.)

== Honours and achievements ==
=== National championships – 28 (record) ===
- Turkish Super League

Winners (19): 1959, 1960–61, 1963–64, 1964–65, 1967–68, 1969–70, 1973–74, 1974–75, 1977–78, 1982–83, 1984–85, 1988–89, 1995–96, 2000–01, 2003–04, 2004–05, 2006–07, 2010–11, 2013–14
Runners-up (27): 1959–60, 1961–62, 1966–67, 1970–71, 1972–73, 1975–76, 1976–77, 1979–80, 1983–84, 1989–90, 1991–92, 1993–94, 1997–98, 2001–02, 2005–06, 2007–08, 2009–10, 2011–12, 2012–13, 2014–15, 2015–16, 2017–18, 2021–22, 2022–23, 2023–24, 2024–25, 2025–26

- Turkish National Division

Winners (6) (record): 1937, 1940, 1943, 1945, 1946, 1950
Runners-up (2): 1944, 1947

- Turkish Football Championship

Winners (3) (record): 1933, 1935, 1944
Runners-up (2): 1940, 1947

=== National cups – 27 ===
- Turkish Cup

Winners (7): 1967–68, 1973–74, 1978–79, 1982–83, 2011–12, 2012–13, 2022–23
Runners-up (11): 1962–63, 1964–65, 1988–89, 1995–96, 2000–01, 2004–05, 2005–06, 2008–09, 2009–10, 2015–16, 2017–18

- Turkish Super Cup

Winners (10): 1968, 1973, 1975, 1984, 1985, 1990, 2007, 2009, 2014, 2025
Runners-up (10): 1970, 1974, 1978, 1979, 1983, 1989, 1996, 2012, 2013, 2023

- Prime Minister's Cup

Winners (8) (record): 1945, 1946, 1950, 1973, 1980, 1989, 1993, 1998
Runners-up (7): 1944, 1971, 1976, 1977, 1992, 1994, 1995

- Atatürk Cup

Winners (1) (shared-record): 1998

- Spor Toto Cup

Winners (1): 1967

=== European competitions ===
- UEFA Champions League

Quarter-finals (1): 2007–08

- UEFA Europa League

Semi-finals (1): 2012–13

- UEFA Europa Conference League

Last 32 (1): 2021–22

- UEFA Cup Winners' Cup

Quarter-finals (1): 1963–64

- Balkans Cup

Winners (1): 1966–67

=== Regional competitions – 21 (record) ===
- Istanbul Football League

Winners (16) (record): 1911–12, 1913–14, 1914–15, 1920–21, 1922–23, 1929–30, 1932–33, 1934–35, 1935–36, 1936–37, 1943–44, 1946–47, 1947–48, 1952–53, 1956–57, 1958–59

- Istanbul Football Cup

Winners (1): 1945

- Istanbul Shield

Winners (4) (record): 1930, 1934, 1938, 1939

=== Others ===
- General Harrington Cup

Winners (1): 1923

- Atatürk Cup

Winners (1) (shared-record): 1964

- Fleet Cup

Winners (4) (record): 1982, 1983, 1984, 1985

- TSYD Cup

Winners (12) (shared-record): 1969, 1973, 1975, 1976, 1978, 1979, 1980, 1982, 1985, 1986, 1994, 1995

- TSYD Challenge Cup

Winners (2) (record): 1976, 1980
