= Ömer Boncuk =

Turkish footballer (1917–1988)

Personal information
- Date of birth: 1917
- Place of birth: Ankara, Ottoman Empire
- Date of death: August 1, 1988 (aged 71)
- Place of death: Istanbul, Turkey
- Position: Midfielder

Senior career*
Years	Team	Apps	(Gls)
1937–1939	Güneş	23	(3)
1939–1947	Fenerbahçe	166	(14)
1947–1950	İstanbulspor	24	(2)
- * Club domestic league appearances and goals

Ömer Boncuk (1917 Ankara – August 1, 1988 Istanbul), formerly Ömer Albakır, was a Turkish football midfielder and a high school teacher for music.

He started playing football in the 1937–38 season at the Istanbul team Güneş SK. He made 24 appearances in two seasons scoring two goals. Following the closure of the club in 1939, Boncuk moved to Fenerbahçe, where he played 166 games and scored 14 goals until 1947. He transferred in the 1947–48 season to İstanbulspor scoring three goals in 24 matches within three seasons.

After retiring from active sport in 1950, Ömer Boncuk pursued a teacher's profession for music at Haydarpaşa High School, where he served also as deputy school director.

He changed his surname from Albakır to Boncuk due to his nickname "Boncuk Ömer" meaning Ömer the Bead" for his short stature. In that era, many football players were nicknamed, and almost all of the Fenerbahçe footballers had nicknames.

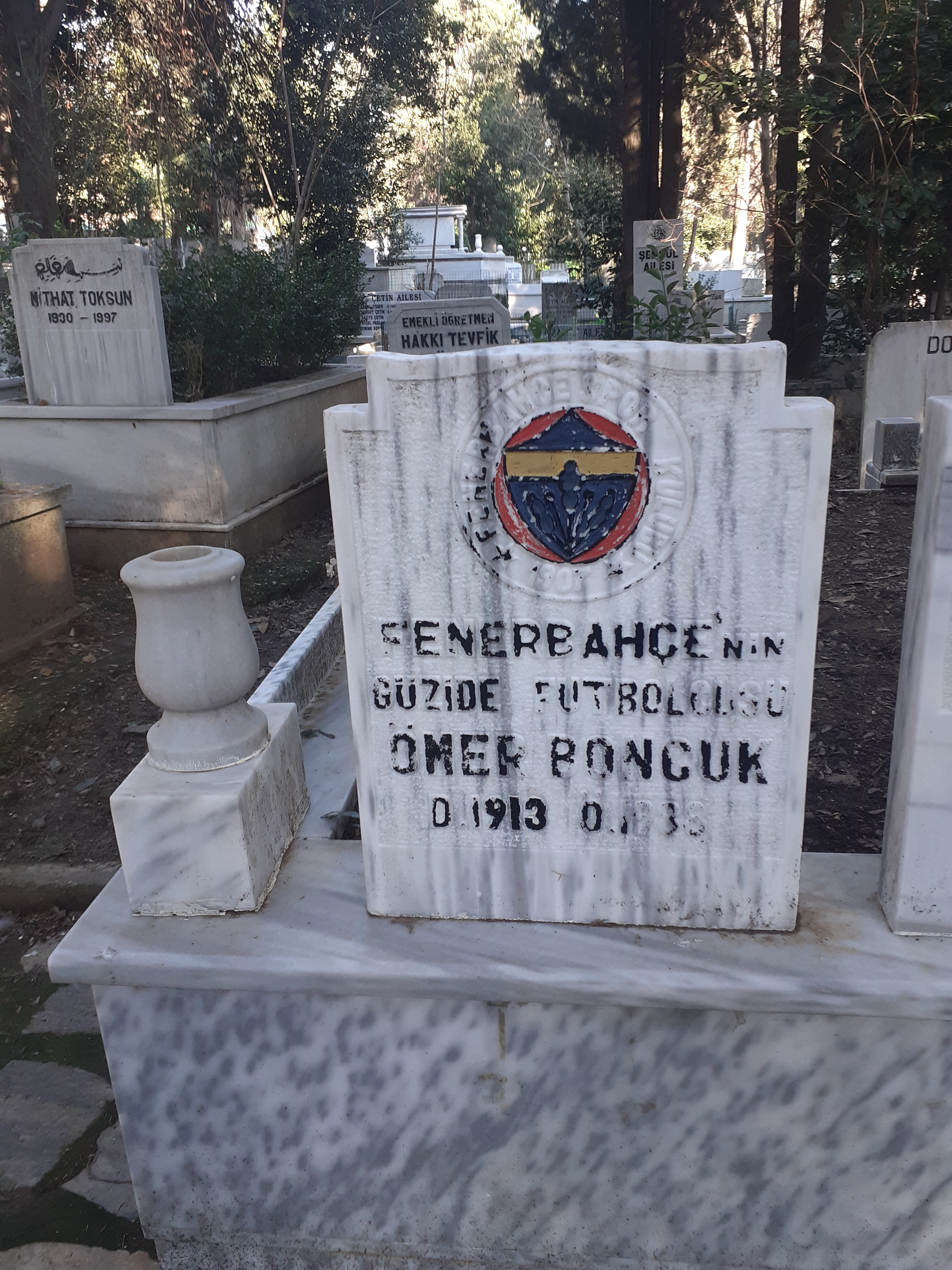
Grave of Ömer Boncuk

Ömer Boncuk died on August 1, 1988, in Istanbul. He was laid to rest at the Karacaahmet Cemetery following the religious funeral service at Galip Pasha Mosque in Erenköy.

== Honours ==
Güneş

- Milli Küme Şampiyonası: 1937–38
- Istanbul Football League: 1937–38

Fenerbahçe

- Milli Küme Şampiyonası: 1939–40, 1942–43, 1944–45, 1945–46, 1949–50; runner-up 1943–44, 1946–47; third place 1940–41
- Istanbul Football League: 1943–44, 1946–47; runner-up 1939–40, 1940–41, 1942–43, 1944–45, 1945–46; third place 1941–42
- Prime Minister's Cup: 1945, 1946
