= 1944–45 Galatasaray S.K. season =

Galatasaray
1944–45 season
- President: (Turkey) Sedat Ziya Kantoğlu (until 23 September 1944) (Turkey) Muslihittin Peykoğlu
- Manager: (England) Bill Baggett
- Stadium: Ali Sami Yen Stadı
- Istanbul Lig: 3rd
- Milli Küme: 3rd
- Istanbul Kupası: Semi final
- Top goalscorer: League: Bülent Eken (13); Gündüz Kılıç (13); All: Bülent Eken (22); Reha Eken (22)
| Home colours | Away colours |

The 1944–45 season was Galatasaray SK's 41st in existence and the club's 33rd consecutive season in the Istanbul Football League.

== Squad statistics ==
| No. | Pos. | Name | IFL | | MKŞ | | IFK | | Total | |
| No. | Pos. | Name | Apps | Goals | Apps | Goals | Apps | Goals | Apps | Goals |
|---|---|---|---|---|---|---|---|---|---|---|
| - | GK | (Turkey) Erdoğan Atlıoğlu | 11 | 0 | 14 | 0 | n/a | n/a | 25 | 0 |
| - | GK | (Turkey) Osman İncili | 4 | 0 | 0 | 0 | n/a | n/a | 4 | 0 |
| - | GK | (Turkey) Saim Kaur | 3 | 0 | 0 | 0 | n/a | n/a | 3 | 0 |
| - | DF | (Turkey) Bülent Eken | 17 | 13 | 13 | 7 | n/a | n/a | 30 | 20 |
| - | DF | (Turkey) Salim Şatıroğlu (C) | 13 | 0 | 7 | 0 | n/a | n/a | 20 | 0 |
| - | DF | (Turkey) İsmet Kalaoğlu | 10 | 0 | 9 | 0 | n/a | n/a | 19 | 0 |
| - | DF | (Turkey) Faruk Barlas | 9 | 0 | 12 | 0 | n/a | n/a | 21 | 0 |
| - | DF | (Turkey) Mahmut Kefeli | 3 | 0 | 0 | 0 | n/a | n/a | 3 | 0 |
| - | DF | (Turkey) Necmi Erdoğdu | 1 | 0 | 0 | 0 | n/a | n/a | 1 | 0 |
| - | DF | (Turkey) Adnan İncirmen | 1 | 0 | 0 | 0 | n/a | n/a | 1 | 0 |
| - | MF | (Turkey) Namık Sınmaz | 16 | 0 | 9 | 0 | n/a | n/a | 25 | 0 |
| - | MF | (Turkey) Mustafa Gençsoy | 16 | 1 | 11 | 0 | n/a | n/a | 27 | 1 |
| - | MF | (Turkey) Arif Sevinç | 13 | 1 | 14 | 0 | n/a | n/a | 27 | 1 |
| - | MF | (Turkey) Enver Arslanalp | 5 | 0 | 0 | 0 | n/a | n/a | 5 | 0 |
| - | MF | (Turkey) Hikmet Ebcim | 3 | 1 | 0 | 0 | n/a | n/a | 3 | 1 |
| - | MF | (Turkey) Turgan Ece | 1 | 0 | 0 | 0 | n/a | n/a | 1 | 0 |
| - | MF | (Turkey) İsmail Yönder | 1 | 0 | 0 | 0 | n/a | n/a | 1 | 0 |
| - | FW | (Turkey) Muzaffer Tokaç | 17 | 9 | 14 | 7 | n/a | n/a | 31 | 16 |
| - | FW | (Turkey) Gündüz Kılıç | 17 | 13 | 10 | 3 | n/a | n/a | 27 | 16 |
| - | FW | (Turkey) Reha Eken | 16 | 9 | 11 | 9 | n/a | n/a | 27 | 18 |
| - | FW | (Turkey) Orhan Canpolat | 15 | 3 | 10 | 1 | n/a | n/a | 25 | 4 |
| - | FW | (Turkey) Şahap Turgan | 5 | 6 | 5 | 2 | n/a | n/a | 10 | 8 |
| - | FW | (Turkey) Gazanfer Olcayto | 1 | 0 | 8 | 1 | n/a | n/a | 9 | 1 |
| - | FW | (Turkey) Mehmet Ali Gültekin | 0 | 0 | 5 | 3 | n/a | n/a | 5 | 3 |
| - | FW | (Turkey) Eşfak Aykaç | 0 | 0 | 2 | 0 | n/a | n/a | 2 | 0 |

== Squad changes for the 1944–1945 season ==
In:

== Competitions ==
=== Istanbul Football League ===
==== Classification ====
| Pos | Team | Pld | W | D | L | GF | GA | GD | Pts |
|---|---|---|---|---|---|---|---|---|---|
| 1 | Beşiktaş JK | 18 | 16 | 2 | 0 | 70 | 10 | +60 | 34 |
| 2 | Fenerbahçe SK | 18 | 14 | 2 | 2 | 58 | 10 | +48 | 30 |
| 3 | Galatasaray SK | 18 | 12 | 4 | 2 | 57 | 21 | +36 | 28 |
| 4 | Beykoz 1908 S.K.D. | 18 | 8 | 5 | 5 | 26 | 31 | −5 | 21 |
| 5 | Beyoğlu SK | 18 | 5 | 5 | 8 | 25 | 39 | −14 | 15 |
| 6 | İstanbulspor | 18 | 5 | 4 | 9 | 27 | 44 | −17 | 14 |
| 7 | Vefa SK | 18 | 4 | 4 | 10 | 24 | 46 | −22 | 12 |
| 8 | Küçükçekmece SK | 18 | 3 | 4 | 11 | 12 | 44 | −32 | 10 |
| 9 | Kasımpaşa SK | 18 | 3 | 2 | 13 | 19 | 43 | −24 | 8 |
| 10 | Anadolu Hisarı İdman Yurdu SK | 18 | 3 | 2 | 13 | 23 | 53 | −30 | 8 |

==== Matches ====
Kick-off listed in local time (EEST)

| 17 September 1944 1 | Beşiktaş JK | 4–1 | Galatasaray SK | Istanbul |
| 16:00 | Şeref Görkey 21', 60'; Kemal Gülçelik 72', 88' | (Report) | Şahap Turgan 51' | Stadium: Şeref Stadı; Referee: Samih Duransoy |

| 24 September 1944 2 | Galatasaray SK | 7–0 | Küçükçekmece SK | Istanbul |
| 14:00 | Şahap Turgan 11', 68', 83'; Reha Eken 35', 59'; Muzaffer Tokaç 67'; Hikmet Ebcim 77' | (Report) | | Stadium: Ali Sami Yen Stadı; Referee: Şekip Akduman |

| 1 October 1944 3 | Galatasaray SK | 2–2 | Fenerbahçe SK | Istanbul |
| 16:00 | Reha Eken 35'; Şahap Turgan 54' | (Report) | Halit Deringör 4'; İbrahim İskeçe 52' | Stadium: Fenerbahçe Stadı; Referee: Adnan Akın |

| 8 October 1944 4 | İstanbulspor | 1–1 | Galatasaray SK | Istanbul |
| 16:00 | Turhan Akra 37' | (Report) | Gündüz Kılıç 50' | Stadium: Ali Sami Yen Stadı; Referee: Mehmet Reşat Nayır |

| 22 October 1944 5 | Galatasaray SK | 3–1 | Beyoğlu SK | Istanbul |
| 15:00 | Muzaffer Tokaç 6' (pen.); Mustafa Gençsoy 59'; Bülent Eken 89' | (Report) | Manoli Culafi 58' | Stadium: Ali Sami Yen Stadı; Referee: Sulhi Garan |

| 5 November 1944 6 | Galatasaray SK | 4–1 | Vefa SK | Istanbul |
| 15:00 | Gündüz Kılıç 44'; Bülent Eken 59', 75'; Muzaffer Tokaç 60' | (Report) | Fahri Savaş 47' | Stadium: Ali Sami Yen Stadı; Referee: Şazi Tezcan |

| 12 November 1944 7 | Galatasaray SK | 6–1 | Anadolu Hisarı İdman Yurdu SK | Istanbul |
| 15:00 | Gündüz Kılıç 9'; Orhan Canpolat 12'; Reha Eken 78', 79'; Bülent Eken 82'; Muzaffer Tokaç 85' | (Report) | Orhan 30' | Stadium: Ali Sami Yen Stadı; Referee: Sami Açıköney |

| 19 November 1944 8 | Beykoz 1908 S.K.D. | 2–1 | Galatasaray SK | Istanbul |
| 15:00 | Mehmet Ali Has 48'; Fikret Erkaya 53' | (Report) | Bülent Eken 71' | Stadium: Ali Sami Yen Stadı; Referee: Samih Duransoy |

| 3 December 1944 9 | Galatasaray SK | 4–0 | Kasımpaşa SK | Istanbul |
| 15:00 | Orhan Canpolat 27'; Gündüz Kılıç 52'; Muzaffer Tokaç 54' (pen.); Bülent Eken 65' | (Report) | | Stadium: Ali Sami Yen Stadı; Referee: Sami Açıköney |

| 10 December 1944 10 | Galatasaray SK | 2–2 | Beşiktaş JK | Istanbul |
| 15:00 | Cahit Yıldırım 38' (o.g.); Şahap Turgan 74' | (Report) | Şeref Görkey 31', 52' | Stadium: Şeref Stadı; Referee: Şazi Tezcan |

| 17 December 1944 11 | Küçükçekmece SK | 0–4 | Galatasaray SK | Istanbul |
| 15:00 | | (Report) | Bülent Eken 6', 8'; Gündüz Kılıç 75'; Reha Eken 82' | Stadium: Ali Sami Yen Stadı; Referee: Sami Açıköney |

| 24 December 1944 12 | Fenerbahçe SK | 2–2 | Galatasaray SK | Istanbul |
| 15:00 | Müzdat Yetkiner 24'; Şevket Demirtepe 90' (pen.) | (Report) | Gündüz Kılıç 20'; Bülent Eken 47' | Stadium: Fenerbahçe Stadı; Referee: Sami Açıköney |

| 7 January 1945 13 | Galatasaray SK | 3–1 | İstanbulspor | Istanbul |
| 15:00 | Orhan Canpolat 56'; Gündüz Kılıç 70'; Reha Eken 85' | (Report) | Muzaffer Gündez 50' | Stadium: Ali Sami Yen Stadı; Referee: Şazi Tezcan |

| 14 January 1945 14 | Beyoğlu SK | 1–2 | Galatasaray SK | Istanbul |
| 15:00 | Faruk Barlas 25' (o.g.) | (Report) | Gündüz Kılıç 40'; Arif Sevinç 81' | Stadium: Ali Sami Yen Stadı; Referee: Sulhi Garan |

| 21 January 1945 15 | Kasımpaşa SK | 1–3 | Galatasaray SK | Istanbul |
| 13:00 | Sait Foto 65' | (Report) | Muzaffer Tokaç 20'; Gündüz Kılıç 35'; Bülent Eken 67' (pen.) | Stadium: Ali Sami Yen Stadı; Referee: Adnan Akın |

| 11 February 1945 16 | Anadolu Hisarı İdman Yurdu SK | 0–4 | Galatasaray SK | Istanbul |
| 15:00 | | (Report) | Gündüz Kılıç 23', 66'; Muzaffer Tokaç 44', 50' | Stadium: Ali Sami Yen Stadı; Referee: Sulhi Garan |

| 18 February 1945 17 | Galatasaray SK | 4–1 | Beykoz 1908 S.K.D. | Istanbul |
| | Gündüz Kılıç 5'; Bülent Eken 35' (pen.), 89'; Reha Eken 72' | (Report) | Kemal Gündoğdu 21' | Stadium: Ali Sami Yen Stadı; Referee: Selami Akal |

| 4 March 1945 18 | Vefa SK | 1–4 | Galatasaray SK | Istanbul |
| 15:00 | Muammer Deniz 44' | (Report) | Reha Eken 29'; Bülent Eken 32'; Muzaffer Tokaç 48'; Gündüz Kılıç 50' | Stadium: Vefa Stadı; Referee: Selami Akal |

=== Milli Küme ===
==== Classification ====
| Pos | Team | Pld | W | D | L | GF | GA | GAv | Pts |
|---|---|---|---|---|---|---|---|---|---|
| 1 | Fenerbahçe | 14 | 10 | 3 | 1 | 42 | 17 | 2.471 | 37 |
| 2 | Beşiktaş | 14 | 8 | 4 | 2 | 39 | 19 | 2.053 | 34 |
| 3 | Galatasaray | 14 | 7 | 4 | 3 | 33 | 13 | 2.538 | 32 |
| 4 | Ankara Demirspor | 14 | 7 | 3 | 4 | 23 | 23 | 1.000 | 31 |
| 5 | Uçaksavar | 14 | 5 | 5 | 4 | 24 | 30 | 0.800 | 29 |
| 6 | Altınordu | 14 | 3 | 1 | 10 | 16 | 28 | 0.571 | 21 |
| 7 | Karşıyaka | 14 | 1 | 4 | 9 | 14 | 33 | 0.424 | 20 |
| 8 | Beykoz 1908 | 14 | 1 | 4 | 9 | 13 | 41 | 0.317 | 20 |

Rules for classification: 3 points for a win, 2 points for a draw, and 1 points for a loss.

==== Matches ====
| 11 March 1945 1 | Beşiktaş JK | 0–1 | Galatasaray SK | Istanbul |
| 16:00 | | (Report) | Muzaffer Tokaç 68' | Stadium: Şeref Stadı; Referee: Sulhi Garan |

| 17 March 1945 2 | Altınordu S.K. | 3–2 | Galatasaray SK | İzmir |
| 15:30 | Hüseyin 9', 33', 53' | (Report) | Şahap Turgan 64'; Muzaffer Tokaç 84' | Stadium: Alsancak Stadı; Referee: Sabri Armağan |

| 18 March 1945 3 | Karşıyaka S.K. | 0–3 | Galatasaray SK | İzmir |
| 13:30 | | (Report) | Muzaffer Tokaç 12' (pen.), 87'; Gündüz Kılıç 53' | Stadium: Alsancak Stadı; Referee: Mustafa Bayrak |

| 24 March 1945 4 | Galatasaray SK | 3–0 | Altınordu S.K. | Istanbul |
| 16:00 | Bülent Eken 44'; Reha Eken 57'; Muzaffer Tokaç 88' | (Report) | | Stadium: Ali Sami Yen Stadı; Referee: Adnan Akın |

| 25 March 1945 5 | Galatasaray SK | 7–0 | Karşıyaka S.K. | Istanbul |
| 14:00 | Bülent Eken 3', 8', 11', 86'; Muzaffer Tokaç 18'; Gündüz Kılıç 27', 70' | (Report) | | Stadium: Fenerbahçe Stadı; Referee: Feridun Kılıç |

| 1 April 1945 6 | Galatasaray SK | 0–0 | Beykoz 1908 S.K.D. | Istanbul |
| 14:30 | | (Report) | | Stadium: Fenerbahçe Stadı; Referee: Şekip Akduman |

| 8 April 1945 7 | Fenerbahçe SK | 1–1 | Galatasaray SK | Istanbul |
| 16:30 | Naci Bastoncu 49' | (Report) | Muzaffer Tokaç 90' | Stadium: Fenerbahçe Stadı; Referee: Feridun Kılıç |

| 15 April 1945 8 | Galatasaray SK | 1–1 | Beşiktaş JK | Istanbul |
| 16:30 | Şahap Turgan 40' | (Report) | Sabri Gençsoy 53' | Stadium: Şeref Stadı; Referee: Adnan Akın |

| 21 April 1945 9 | Galatasaray SK | 1–1 | Ankara Demirspor | Istanbul |
| 16:30 | Reha Eken 32' | (Report) | Niyazi 46' | Stadium: Ali Sami Yen Stadı; Referee: Sulhi Garan |

| 22 April 1945 10 | Galatasaray SK | 1–0 | Uçaksavar | Istanbul |
| 14:30 | Mehmet Ali Gültekin 64' | (Report) | | Stadium: Fenerbahçe Stadı; Referee: Adnan Akın |

| 28 April 1945 11 | Ankara Demirspor | 1–0 | Galatasaray SK | Ankara |
| 14:30 | Niyazi 46'; Mustafa Ercan 62' | (Report) | Bülent Eken 75' | Stadium: Ankara 19 Mayıs Stadium; Referee: Ziya Ozan |

| 29 April 1945 12 | Uçaksavar | 1–7 | Galatasaray SK | Ankara |
| 16:30 | Ertuğrul 23' | (Report) | Reha Eken 1', 31', 85'; Bülent Eken 25'; Gazanfer Olcayto 51'; Mehmet Ali Gültekin 59', 69' | Stadium: Ankara 19 Mayıs Stadium; Referee: Necdet Özgüç |

| 13 May 1945 13 | Beykoz 1908 S.K.D. | 1–3 | Galatasaray SK | Istanbul |
| 14:30 | Fikret Erkaya 20' | (Report) | Reha Eken 35', 68'; Orhan Canpolat 50' | Stadium: Şeref Stadı; Referee: Sulhi Garan |

| 20 May 1945 14 | Galatasaray SK | 2–3 | Fenerbahçe SK | Istanbul |
| 16:30 | Reha Eken 38', 56' | (Report) | Melih Kotanca 30', 80'; Şevket Demirtepe 68' (pen.) | Stadium: Fenerbahçe Stadı; Referee: Sulhi Garan |

=== Istanbul Futbol Kupası ===
==== Matches ====
| 28 January 1945 1/2 Final 1st leg | Fenerbahçe SK | 0–0 | Galatasaray SK | Istanbul |
| | ? | (Report) | ? |

| 23 September 1945 1/2 Final 2nd leg | Galatasaray SK | 0–3 | Fenerbahçe SK | Istanbul |
| | ? | (Report) | ? |
