= Naci Bastoncu =

Turkish footballer (1914–1983)

Personal information
- Full name: Naci Bastoncu
- Date of birth: January 1, 1914
- Place of birth: Trabzon, Turkey
- Date of death: 28 October 1983 (aged 69)
- Position: Striker

Senior career*
Years	Team	Apps	(Gls)
1934–1947	Fenerbahçe	288	(159)
- * Club domestic league appearances and goals as of 5 December 2020 ‡ National team caps and goals as of 5 December 2020

Naci Bastoncu (1 January 1914 - 28 October 1983) was a Turkish footballer who played as a striker.

== Playing career ==
Bastoncu played with Fenerbahçe for his entire career, helping them win 17 domestic trophies. He scored 159 goals in 288 matches. Despite his prolific club career, he was unable to represent the Turkey national team due to the outbreak of World War II.

== Honours ==
Fenerbahçe

- Turkish National Division (5): 1937, 1940, 1943, 1945, 1946
- Prime Minister's Cup (2): 1945, 1946
- Turkish Football Championship (2): 1935, 1944
- Istanbul Football League (5): 1934–35, 1935–36, 1936–37, 1943–44, 1946–47
- Istanbul Cup (1): 1945
- Istanbul Shield (2): 1938, 1939
