= 1936–37 Galatasaray S.K. season =

Galatasaray
1936–37 season
- President: (Turkey) Ethem Menemencioğlu (until 3 April 1937) (Turkey) Saim Gogen
- Manager: (Hungary) Peter Szabo
- Stadium: Taksim Stadı
- Istanbul Lig: 3rd
- Milli Küme: 2nd
- Top goalscorer: League: Gündüz Kılıç (12); All: Haşim Birkan (14); Bülent Ediz (14)
Home colours	Away colours

The 1936–37 season was Galatasaray SK's 33rd in existence and the club's 25th consecutive season in the Istanbul Football League.

== Squad statistics ==
No.	Pos.	Name	IFL		MKŞ		Total	
No.	Pos.	Name	Apps	Goals	Apps	Goals	Apps	Goals
-	GK	(Turkey) Sacit Öget	1	0	4	0	5	0
-	GK	(Turkey) Avni Kurgan (C)	10	0	10	0	20	0
-	DF	(Turkey) Lütfü Aksoy	8	0	14	0	22	0
-	DF	(Turkey) Salim Şatıroğlu	11	1	9	3	20	4
-	DF	(Turkey) Refik Tarman	1	0	0	0	1	0
-	DF	(Turkey) Reşat Erkal	11	2	13	3	24	5
-	MF	(Turkey) Finlandiyali Hayrullah	5	0	5	0	10	0
-	MF	(Turkey) Nuri	0	0	1	0	1	0
-	MF	(Turkey) Şevket Bulat	3	2	0	0	3	2
-	MF	(Turkey) Bülent Davran	0	0	1	0	1	0
-	MF	(Turkey) Hüseyin Şakir	2	0	3	0	5	0
-	MF	(Turkey) Hicri Yüce	1	0	0	0	1	0
-	MF	(Turkey) Ekrem Kapman	1	0	13	0	14	0
-	MF	(Turkey) Suavi Atasagun	10	0	11	1	21	1
-	FW	(Turkey) Necdet Cici	10	6	13	2	23	8
-	FW	(Turkey) Fazıl Özkaptan	1	0	0	0	1	0
-	FW	(Turkey) Gündüz Kılıç	8	12	2	0	10	12
-	FW	(Turkey) Bülent Ediz	10	5	12	9	22	14
-	FW	(Turkey) Eşfak Aykaç	8	4	13	3	21	7
-	FW	(Turkey) Selahattin Buda	1	0	1	0	2	0
-	FW	(Turkey) Süleyman Tekil	2	2	11	10	13	12
-	FW	(Turkey) Haşim Birkan	7	7	12	7	19	14
-	FW	(Turkey) Danyal Vuran	10	2	5	1	15	3
-	FW	(Turkey) Nubar Hamamcıyan	0	0	1	0	1	0

== Squad changes for the 1936–37 season ==
In: Note: Flags indicate national team as defined under FIFA eligibility rules; some limited exceptions apply. Players may hold more than one non-FIFA nationality.

No.	Pos.	Nation	Player
-		TUR	Şevket Bulatoğlu (from Galatasaray High School)
-		TUR	Refik Tarman (from Galatasaray High School)
-		TUR	Ekrem Kapman (from Fenerbahçe SK)
-		TUR	Süleyman Tekil (from Fenerbahçe SK)

== Competitions ==
=== Istanbul Football League ===
==== Classification ====
Pos	Team	Pld	W	D	L	GF	GA	GD	Pts
1	Fenerbahçe SK	11	11	0	0	47	1	+46	33
2	Güneş SK	11	8	2	1	32	6	+26	29
3	Galatasaray SK	11	8	1	2	43	10	+33	28
4	Beşiktaş JK	11	8	1	2	39	12	+27	28
5	Beykoz 1908 S.K.D.	11	3	4	4	22	22	0	21
6	Vefa SK	11	4	2	5	27	27	0	21
7	Eyüpspor	11	3	2	6	13	40	−27	19
8	Küçükçekmece SK	11	3	2	6	22	26	−4	18 (Note: 1 point deducted?)
9	İstanbulspor	11	2	3	6	22	30	−8	18
10	Topkapı SK	11	3	1	7	26	49	−23	18
11	Üsküdar Anadolu SK	11	4	0	7	16	33	−17	18 (Note: 1 point deducted?)
12	Hilal SK	11	0	0	11	7	60	−53	10 (Note: 1 point deducted?)

==== Matches ====
Kick-off listed in local time (EEST)

25 October 1936 1	Galatasaray SK	4–0	Beykoz 1908 S.K.D.	Istanbul
15:30	Eşfak Aykaç 13', 59'; Bülent Ediz 16'; Gündüz Kılıç 47'	(Report)		Stadium: Taksim Stadı; Referee: Nuri Bosut

8 November 1936 2	Beşiktaş JK	2–1	Galatasaray SK	Istanbul
15:30	Nazım Onar 9'; Sulhi Garan 15'	(Report)	Eşfak Aykaç 50'	Stadium: Şeref Stadı; Referee: Booth

15 November 1936 3	Galatasaray SK	2–1	Küçükçekmece SK	Istanbul
13:30	Eşfak Aykaç 31'; Salim Şatıroğlu 77'	(Report)	Ali Kumsal 56'	Stadium: Taksim Stadı; Referee: Halit Galip Ezgü

22 November 1936 4	Galatasaray SK	7–0	Hilal SK	Istanbul
15:30	Gündüz Kılıç 5', 25', 68', 82'; Danyal Vuran 13', 51'; Necdet Cici 35'	(Report)		Stadium: Taksim Stadı; Referee: Sedat Akçaoğlu

29 November 1936 5	Üsküdar Anadolu SK	1–3	Galatasaray SK	Istanbul
13:30	Tarık Altınsoy 49'	(Report)	Necdet Cici 20'; Bülent Ediz 31'; Gündüz Kılıç 63'	Stadium: Taksim Stadı; Referee: Halit Galip Ezgü

20 December 1936 6	Güneş SK	1–1	Galatasaray SK	Istanbul
14:30	Rasih Minkari 19'	(Report)	Haşim Birkan 30'	Stadium: Taksim Stadı; Referee: Ahmet Adem Göğdün

27 December 1936 7	Galatasaray SK	12–1	Topkapı SK	Istanbul
12:30	Bülent Ediz 2'; Gündüz Kılıç 15', 21', 29', 33', 40', 87'; Necdet Cici 18', 74', 79'; Şevket Bulat 71'; Reşat Erkal 82'p	(Report)	Haydar Çepel 55'	Stadium: Taksim Stadı; Referee: Ahmet Adem Göğdün

3 January 1937 8	Galatasaray SK	3–0	Vefa SK	Istanbul
	Necdet Cici 16'; Süleyman Tekil 27', 38'	(Report)		Stadium: Taksim Stadı; Referee: Ahmet Adem Göğdün

7 February 1937 9	Fenerbahçe SK	4–1	Galatasaray SK	Istanbul
16:00	Bülent Büyükyüksel 19', 51', 85'; Fikret Arıcan 63'p	(Report)	Bülent Ediz 14'	Stadium: Taksim Stadı; Referee: Booth

14 February 1937 10	Galatasaray SK	3–0	İstanbulspor	Istanbul
16:00	Haşim Birkan 5', 63'; Bülent Ediz 11'	(Report)		Stadium: Taksim Stadı; Referee: Ahmet Adem Göğdün

28 February 1937 11	Galatasaray SK	6–0	Eyüpspor	Istanbul
12:00	Haşim Birkan 17', 33', 60', 85'; Reşat Erkal 41'; Şevket Bulat 79'	(Report)		Stadium: Taksim Stadı; Referee: Adnan Akın

=== Milli Küme ===
==== Classification ====
Pos	Team	Pld	W	D	L	GF	GA	GAv	Pts
1	Fenerbahçe	14	10	2	2	34	16	2.125	36
2	Galatasaray	14	8	4	2	39	24	1.625	34
3	Beşiktaş	14	5	5	4	22	19	1.158	29
4	Güneş	14	5	4	5	33	27	1.222	28
5	Gençlerbirliği	14	5	2	7	25	28	0.893	26
6	MKE Ankaragücü	14	5	2	7	30	34	0.882	26
7	Doğanspor	14	4	2	8	28	48	0.583	24
8	Üçok	14	2	3	9	26	41	0.634	21

Rules for classification: 3 points for a win, 2 points for a draw, and 1 points for a loss.

==== Matches ====
21 March 1937 1	Galatasaray SK	2–2	Güneş SK	Istanbul
13:00	Bülent Ediz 69'; Haşim Birkan 73'	(Report)	Selahattin Almay 30', 71'	Stadium: Taksim Stadı; Referee: Ivan Gacef

18 April 1937 2	Galatasaray SK	0–0	Fenerbahçe SK	Istanbul
15:30		(Report)		Stadium: Taksim Stadı; Referee: Adnan Akın

24 April 1937 3	Doğan SK	2–3	Galatasaray SK	İzmir
15:00	Hakkı 31', 70'	(Report)	Necdet Cici 14'; Süleyman Tekil 72'; Eşfak Aykaç 82'	Stadium: Alsancak Stadı; Referee: Adnan Akın

25 April 1937 4	Üçok SK	2–4	Galatasaray SK	İzmir
15:00	Basri Taşkavak 33'; Sait Altınordu 35'	(Report)	Bülent Ediz 1', 30'; Reşat Erkal 76' (pen.); Süleyman Tekil 87'	Stadium: Alsancak Stadi; Referee: Niyazi Taşdelen

16 May 1937 5	Galatasaray SK	2–2	Beşiktaş JK	Istanbul
16:00	Süleyman Tekil 25'; Bülent Ediz 72'	(Report)	Hakkı Yeten 13'; Rıdvan Köksal 40'	Stadium: Taksim Stadı; Referee: Şazi Tezcan

22 May 1937 6	Galatasaray SK	7–3	Üçok SK	Istanbul
15:30	Reşat Erkal 6' (pen.); Süleyman Tekil 26', 61', 64'; Eşfak Aykaç 35'; Haşim Birkan 40'; Necdet Cici 58'	(Report)	Sait Altınordu 55', 67', 83' (pen.)	Stadium: Taksim Stadı; Referee: Refik Osman Top

29 May 1937 7	Ankaragücü	3–4	Galatasaray SK	Ankara
16:00	Yaşar Yalçınpınar 19', 29'; Abdül Küçüktaşkıner 83'	(Report)	Süleyman Tekil 17', 42'; Haşim Birkan 21'; Danyal Vuran 65'	Stadium: 19 Mayıs Stadium; Referee: Mustafa (İzmir'li)

30 May 1937 8	Gençlerbirliği	2–3	Galatasaray SK	Ankara
14:00	Niyazi 4'; Kadri 82'	(Report)	Süleyman Tekil 32'; Haşim Birkan 37'; Bülent Ediz 57'	Stadium: 19 Mayıs Stadium; Referee: Mustafa (İzmir'li)

6 June 1937 9	Galatasaray SK	2–4	Ankaragücü	Istanbul
15:30	Bülent Ediz 66'; Haşim Birkan 68'	(Report)	Şükrü Gülesin 5' (pen.); Yaşar Yalçınpınar 62', 64', 76'	Stadium: Taksim Stadı; Referee: Nuri Bosut

13 June 1937 10	Galatasaray SK	5–0	Doğan SK	Istanbul
15:30	Salim Şatıroğlu 2', 47', 74'; Eşfak Aykaç 20'; Süleyman Tekil 41'	(Report)		Stadium: Taksim Stadı; Referee: Kemal Halim Gürgen

20 June 1937 11	Galatasaray SK	2–0	Gençlerbirliği	Istanbul
15:30	Haşim Birkan 32'; Reşat Erkal 75' (pen.)	(Report)		Stadium: Taksim Stadı; Referee: Mustafa (İzmir'li)

27 June 1937 12	Fenerbahçe SK	2–1	Galatasaray SK	Istanbul
14:00	Esat Kaner 53'; Orhan Canpolat 85'	(Report)	Bülent Ediz 89'	Stadium: Şeref Stadı; Attendance: 9,000; Referee: Nuri Bosut

4 July 1937 13	Güneş SK	1–1	Galatasaray SK	Istanbul
16:00	Melih Kotanca 76'	(Report)	Haşim Birkan 74'	Stadium: Fenerbahçe Stadı; Referee: Sait Selahattin Cihanoğlu

11 July 1937 14	Beşiktaş JK	1–3	Galatasaray SK	Istanbul
14:00	Eşref Bilgiç 53' (pen.)	(Report)	Suavi Atasagun 23'; Bülent Ediz 70', 85'	Stadium: Taksim Stadı; Referee: Bedri Gürsoy

=== Friendly Matches ===
5 December 1936 1	Galatasaray SK	3–2	Čechie Karlín	Istanbul
		[ (Report)]		Stadium: Taksim Stadı

1 August 1937 1	Galatasaray SK	4–1	Admira Wacker	Istanbul
		[ (Report)]		Stadium: Taksim Stadı

3 August 1937 1	Galatasaray SK	0–0	Admira Wacker	Istanbul
		[ (Report)]		Stadium: Taksim Stadı

==== Ankara Stadyum Kupası ====
15 December 1936 1	MKE Ankaragücü	2–1	Galatasaray SK	Ankara
	Hamdi Toptop 43'; Yaşar Yalçınpınar 55'	(Report)	Gündüz Kılıç 86'	Stadium: 19 Mayıs Stadı; Referee: Booth
