= Halit Deringör =

Turkish footballer (1922–2018)

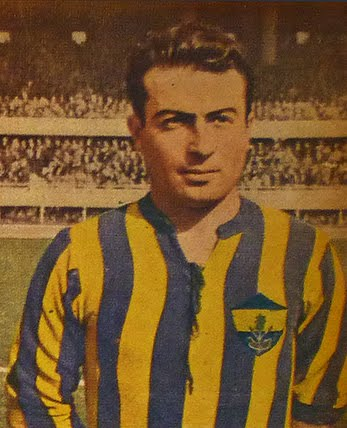

Personal information
- Full name: Halit Deringör
- Date of birth: 17 July 1922
- Place of birth: Istanbul, Turkey
- Date of death: 14 March 2018 (aged 95)
- Position: Forward

Youth career
- 1937–1942: Fenerbahçe

Senior career*
| Years | Team | Apps | (Gls) |
| 1942–1952 | Fenerbahçe | 193 | (67) |

International career^{‡}
| 1948–1950 | Turkey | 5 | (2) |
- * Club domestic league appearances and goals as of 12 March 2018 ‡ National team caps and goals as of 12 March 2018

Halit Deringör (17 July 1922 – 14 March 2018) was a Turkish footballer, who spent his entire playing career with Fenerbahçe in Turkey. His sportsmanship and passion for the game, made him one of the most iconic players in the history of the club.

== Professional career ==
Deringör begun football as a child. He caught measles, and was kept indoors for 40 days with only a football to play with. He joined the Fenerbahçe youth academy in 1937, and in 1942 joined the senior team. He only played for Fenerbahçe throughout his playing career, finishing his career with 67 goals in 193 games.

== International career ==
Deringör represented the Turkey national football team 5 times, scoring twice. He made his debut for Turkey in a 3–1 friendly win over Greece on 23 April 1948. He scored his first goal in a friendly 6-1 win over Iran on 28 May 1950. He was also part of Turkey's squad for the football tournament at the 1948 Summer Olympics, but he did not play in any matches.

== Personal life ==
After his playing career, Deringör became a sports writer and wrote articles for Cumhuriyet for 20 years. He died on 14 March 2018, at the age of 95.

== Honours ==
Fenerbahçe

- Turkish National Division: 1942–43, 1944–45, 1949–50
- Istanbul Football League: 1943–44, 1946–47
- Istanbul Football Cup: 1944–45, 1945–46
- Prime Minister's Cup: 1944–45, 1945–46, 1949–50
