= Mehmet Ali Tanman =

Turkish association football player

- Beşiktaş JK squad (1940-1941)

Personal information
- Full name: Mehmet Ali Tanman
- Date of birth: 1 January 1913
- Date of death: Unknown
- Position: Goalkeeper

Senior career*
Years	Team	Apps	(Gls)
1933–1946	Beşiktaş	354	(0)
- * Club domestic league appearances and goals

Mehmet Ali Tanman (born 1 January 1913) was a Turkish international association football player. He played his entire career at Beşiktaş.

== Career ==
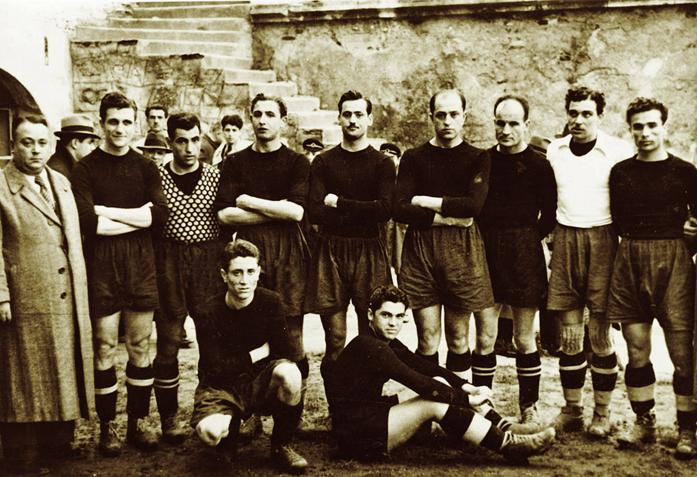
Tanman in white keeper pullover, 2nd on back row, in 1941–42 season

Tanman was recruited in Beşiktaş by former manager and club executive Ahmed Şerafettin. He became the regular goalkeeper of the club after Sadri Usuoğlu.

== Honours ==
Beşiktaş J.K.

- Istanbul Football League (8): 1933–34, 1938–39, 1939–40, 1940–41, 1941–42, 1942–43, 1944–45, 1945–46
- Turkish National Division (2): 1940, 1944
- Chancellor Cup (1): 1944
