= Hakkı Yeten =

Turkish footballer (1910–1989)

- Yeten in the 1940-1941 season

Personal information
- Date of birth: 3 December 1910
- Place of birth: Vodina, Ottoman Empire
- Date of death: 16 April 1989 (aged 78–79)
- Place of death: Istanbul, Turkey
- Position: Second striker

Senior career*
Years	Team	Apps	(Gls)
1926-1931	Karagümrük		
1931–1948	Beşiktaş	439	(382)

International career
1931–1936	Turkey	3	(1)

Managerial career
- 1949: Beşiktaş
- 1950–1951: Beşiktaş
- 1951–195?: Vefa
- * Club domestic league appearances and goals

Hakkı Yeten (3 December 1910 – 16 April 1989) was a Turkish football player and president of the Istanbul-based football club Beşiktaş J.K., which he also coached. He is one of the most important names in Beşiktaş history.

He made Beşiktaş strong in character and club basis and has many records. He is still the football player who scored the most goals in Beşiktaş's history and scored the most in derbies. Its name is kept alive in Beşiktaş's infrastructure facilities. In addition, the east tribune of Vodafone Park, which was opened in 2016, was named Baba Hakkı Tribünü ('Father Hakkı Tribune').

Hakkı Yeten is one of the two honorary presidents of Beşiktaş, along with Süleyman Seba.

== Early life and career ==
Yeten was born in 1910 at Vodina, in the Salonica Vilayet of the Ottoman Empire (present-day Greece). His father, a major in the Ottoman Army moved his family of six children to Istanbul, settling in the Beşiktaş district when Yeten was a year old. In 1914, Yeten's father was killed in the Battle of Gallipoli. Yeten went on to attend military high school, as his two elder brothers did before him.

Yeten was attracted to football after his eldest brother, Muhtar, a multi-talented sportsman) introduced him to the sport. Yeten played in the school team, and was discovered soon by Beşiktaş J.K. club managers. He was one of the founders of Karagümrük and played for them between 1926 and 1931. In 1931, Yeten dropped out of school and joined Beşiktaş.

He played for Beşiktaş for 17 years mostly in the second striker position, contributing to its numerous victories. Declared as permanent captain, he led Beşiktaş to 8 Istanbul League Champions, 3 Istanbul Cups, one İzmir International Fair Cup, 3 National League Champions, one Turkish Champion, 2 Prime Minister Cups and 4 Private Cups. Yeten was capped only three times for the Turkey national football team due to World War II. His fame became international, and eventually the English team Arsenal showed and interest in him. However, Yeten preferred to stay in Turkey. Yeten scored 382 goals in 439 games. He quit football as a player in 1948 after fans hooted him during a match.

He was appointed coach in the 1948–1949 season, and served once again as manager in the 1950–1951 season.

Yeten studied Law, graduating in 1937. He became a legal advisor for a state owned bank. After his retirement from the active sports, he served as Vice Chairman of the Turkish Football Federation, and acted as president of Beşiktaş J.K. for three terms in 1960–1963, 1964–1966 and 1967–1968. In 1984, he backed Süleyman Seba in the elections, who became club president.

Called "Baba" ("Father") Hakkı, he was elected the first honorary president of his club before he died on April 17, 1989, in Istanbul. He was buried at the Zincirlikuyu Cemetery.

== Career statistics ==
=== International goals ===
#	Date	Venue	Opponent	Score	Result	Competition
1.	27 September 1931	Vasil Levski National Stadium, Sofia, Bulgaria	Bulgaria	5–1	Lost	Balkan Cup
Correct as of 10 February 2010

== Honours ==
=== Player ===
Beşiktaş

- Istanbul Football League: 1933–34, 1938–39, 1939–40, 1940–41, 1941–42, 1942–43, 1944–45, 1945–46
- Turkish Football Championship: 1934
- Istanbul Shield: 1935
- Turkish National Division: 1941, 1944, 1947
- Prime Minister's Cup: 1944, 1947

Individual

- Istanbul Football League Top Scorer: 1931–32, 1932–33, 1933–34
- Turkish Football Championship Top Scorer: 1934
- Turkish National Division Top Scorer: 1939, 1941, 1944
- Beşiktaş all time scorer, (382 goal)
- Beşiktaş–Fenerbahçe rivalry top goal scorer, (32 goal)
- Beşiktaş–Galatasaray rivalry top goal scorer, (29 goal)
- Beşiktaş J.K. Squads of Century (Golden Team)

=== Manager ===
Beşiktaş

- Istanbul Football League: 1950–51
- Turkish Football Championship: 1951

=== President ===
Beşiktaş

- Turkish 1. Football League: 1965–66
- Turkish 1. Football League: 1966–67
- Presidential Cup: 1967

== See also ==
- List of one-club men

Sporting positions
Preceded by Nuri Togay	President of Beşiktaş JK; 1960–1963	Succeeded by Selahattin Akel
Preceded by Selahattin Akel	President of Beşiktaş JK; 1964–1966	Succeeded by Hasan Salman
Preceded by Hasan Salman	President of Beşiktaş JK; 1967–1968	Succeeded by Talat Asal
