= 1939 Turkish National Division =

Turkish National Division
- Season: 1939
- Champions: Galatasaray (1st title)
- Matches: 56
- Goals: 230 (4.11 per match)
- Top goalscorer: Cemil Erlertürk & Hakkı Yeten (13)

The 1939 National Division was the third edition of the Turkish National Division. Galatasaray won their first title.

== Participants ==
- Beşiktaş - 1938–39 Istanbul Football League, 1st
- Fenerbahçe - 1938–39 Istanbul Football League, 2nd
- Galatasaray - 1938–39 Istanbul Football League, 3rd
- Vefa - 1938–39 Istanbul Football League, 4th
- Ankara Demirspor - Ankara Football League, 1st
- AS-FA Gücü - Ankara Football League, 2nd
- Doğanspor - İzmir Football League, 1st
- Ateşspor - İzmir Football League, 2nd

== League standings ==
Pos	Team	Pld	W	D	L	GF	GA	GAv	Pts
1	Galatasaray (Note: Galatasaray and Ankara Demirspor played in a championship playoff, but the result of this playoff was not used, and ultimately Galatasaray was awarded the championship based on goal average.)	14	11	0	3	43	19	2.263	35 (Note: 35 (not 36) points due to awarded games.)
2	Ankara Demirspor	14	9	3	2	35	16	2.188	35
3	AS-FA Gücü	14	9	1	4	34	21	1.619	33
4	Beşiktaş	14	8	2	4	37	17	2.176	32
5	Fenerbahçe	14	6	2	6	31	26	1.192	28
6	Vefa	14	3	2	9	28	36	0.778	22
7	Doğanspor	14	3	1	10	13	49	0.265	21
8	Ateşspor	14	1	1	12	9	43	0.209	17

Rules for classification: 3 points for a win, 2 points for a draw, and 1 points for a loss.

== Results ==
Home \ Away	AND	AGÜ	ATŞ	BJK	DOĞ	FNB	GAL	VEF
Ankara Demirspor		2–2	5–1	2–0	7–0	1–1	2–0	6–3
AS-FA Gücü	1–2		6–0	1–0	1–0	3–2	4–1	3–1
Ateşspor	0–1	1–3		2–1	0–1	0–1	2–7	0–6
Beşiktaş	1–1	4–1	3–0		5–1	3–0	3–0	3–3
Doğanspor	1–2	1–4	1–1	1–6		1–0	0–4	3–1
Fenerbahçe	4–1	4–1	2–0	2–4	5–1		3–4	1–0
Galatasaray	2–1	2–1	3–1	3–1	7–0	4–3		4–1
Vefa	0–2	1–3	3–1	0–3	6–2	3–3	0–2	

Legend: Blue = home team win; Yellow = draw; Red = away team win.
