= 1929–30 Beşiktaş J.K. season =

Beşiktaş J.K.
1929–30 season
- President: (Turkey) Ahmet Aşeni
- Manager: (Hungary) Imre Zinger
- Stadium: Taksim Stadium
- Istanbul Football League: 3rd
- Turkish Football Cup: Did not win

The 1929–30 was Beşiktaş J.K.'s 11th official season and their 27th year in existence. Just like the previous year they finished 3rd behind Fenerbahçe and Galatasaray.
