= Kemal Gülçelik =

Turkish footballer and manager

Personal information
- Date of birth: 1923
- Place of birth: Istanbul, Turkey
- Date of death: 26 April 1986 (aged 62–63)
- Place of death: Istanbul, Turkey
- Position: Forward

Senior career*
Years	Team	Apps	(Gls)
1941–1949	Beşiktaş	129	(122)

International career
	Turkey	2	(0)
- * Club domestic league appearances and goals

Kemal Gülçelik (1923 – 26 April 1986) was a Turkish football player and assistant manager. He spent all of his senior career at Beşiktaş.

== Honours ==
=== Beşiktaş ===
- Istanbul Football League: 1941–42, 1942–43, 1944–45, 1945–46, 1949–50
- Istanbul Football Cup: 1944
- Turkish National Division: 1944, 1947
- Prime Minister's Cup: 1944

=== Individual ===
- Turkish National Division top scorer: 1944
- Beşiktaş J.K. Squads of Century (Golden Team)
