= 1938 Turkish National Division =

Turkish National Division
- Season: 1938
- Champions: Güneş SK (1st title)
- Matches: 56
- Goals: 239 (4.27 per match)
- Top goalscorer: Şeref Görkey (13)

The 1938 National Division was the second edition of the Turkish National Division. Güneş SK won their first title.

== Overview ==
Fenerbahçe got into a conflict with the Turkish Football Federation, as they initially wanted to play the home games in their own homeground, but the federation declined the request. Fenerbahçe claimed that their travel expenses were not paid appropriately by the TFF and withdrew after the 4th match.

== Participants ==
- Güneş SK - Istanbul Football League, 1st
- Fenerbahçe - Istanbul Football League, 2nd
- Beşiktaş - Istanbul Football League, 3rd
- Galatasaray - Istanbul Football League, 4th
- Harp Okulu - Ankara Football League, 1st
- Muhafızgücü - Ankara Football League, 2nd
- Üçok - İzmir Football League, 1st
- Alsancak - İzmir Football League

== League standings ==
Pos	Team	Pld	W	D	L	GF	GA	GAv	Pts
1	Güneş	14	13	1	0	42	9	4.667	41
2	Beşiktaş	14	9	2	3	37	14	2.643	34
3	Galatasaray	14	8	0	6	28	29	0.966	30
4	Üçok	14	7	0	7	34	34	1.000	28
5	Muhafızgücü	14	5	2	7	23	30	0.767	26
6	Harp Okulu	14	5	1	8	22	24	0.917	25
7	Alsancak	14	4	0	10	19	37	0.514	21 (Note: 1 point deducted?)
8	Fenerbahçe	14	1	2	11	12	7	1.714	8 (Note: Withdrew from the competition)

Rules for classification: 3 points for a win, 2 points for a draw, and 1 points for a loss.

== Results ==
Home \ Away	ALK	BJK	FNB	GAL	GÜN	HAR	MUH	ÜÇO
Alsancak		0–3	3–0	3–2	1–2	0–1	2–0	3–7
Beşiktaş	5–0		3–0	1–2	0–1	3–2	1–3	6–3
Fenerbahçe	9–1	1–1		0–3	0–3	0–3	0–0	0–3
Galatasaray	3–2	1–2	3–0		0–7	0–3	3–1	3–1
Güneş	3–0	0–0	5–2	4–2		3–0	3–1	4–1
Harp Okulu	1–2	0–2	3–0	0–1	0–2		2–2	3–0
Muhafızgücü	3–2	0–7	3–0	2–3	2–3	2–0		2–1
Üçok	1–0	1–3	3–0	3–2	0–2	7–4	3–2	

Legend: Blue = home team win; Yellow = draw; Red = away team win.
