= Said Altınordu =

Turkish footballer (1912–1978)

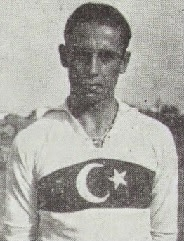

Personal information
- Full name: Said Altınordu
- Date of birth: 24 July 1912
- Place of birth: Üsküdar, Ottoman Empire
- Date of death: 17 November 1978 (aged 66)
- Place of death: İzmir, Turkey
- Positions: Defender; right half

Senior career*
| Years | Team | Apps | (Gls) |
| 1929–1956 | Altınordu (Note: His numbers in the infobox aren't only league matches; they also include cup matches.) | 847 | (29) |

International career
| 1932–1937 | Turkey | 4 | (0) |
- * Club domestic league appearances and goals

Said Altınordu (born Said Bey, 24 July 1912 – 17 November 1978), alternatively spelled Sait Altınordu, was a Turkish international footballer. Being a notable one-club man, Altınordu remains one of the most symbolic footballers of the Turkish city of İzmir, along with Vahap Özaltay of Altay and Fuat Göztepe of Göztepe. His identification with Altınordu led him to choose the official name of the club as his surname, following the Surname Law of Turkey enacted in 1934.

Altınordu spent his entire career at Altınordu, winning 6 İzmir Football League titles; he is widely considered to be the club's greatest player of all time. Altınordu also won 4 caps for Turkey between 1932 and 1937, and was part of their squad at the 1936 Summer Olympics; no other Altınordu players were called up to the Turkey national team for 78 years, until Çağlar Söyüncü was invited in 2016.

In general, Altınordu is reported to have been primarily deployed as a defender, but he was also capable of scoring goals; he is credited with 29 goals, 13 of which were scored during the 1937 Millî Küme campaign, making him the league's top scorer that year.

== Playing style ==
According to Nimet, Altınordu's wife, he used to train by himself at the Alsancak Stadium, practicing his shooting abilities. According to Erdoğan Sungur, an İzmir-based author who saw Altınordu play live, Altınordu was capable of "making feints, producing 'delicious' shots, and having a 'great' football intelligence."

== Legacy ==
Altınordu was the role model of Metin Oktay, a prolific goalscorer for both Galatasaray and the Turkish national team. The youth and academy facilities of Altınordu, located in Yeşilyurt County, are named in Altınordu's honor. In 2016, one of the 15 newly launched ferries of İzmir was named after Altınordu following an online-public poll.

A statue of Altınordu was opened in front of Alsancak Terminal, İzmir, on 27 December 2014, to commemorate the 91st anniversary of Altınordu's founding. The statue depicts the moment of Altınordu taking the winning shot against Eskişehir Demirspor during the 1935 Turkish Football Championship semi-final game.

Despite the rivalry between their clubs, Altınordu and Vahap Özaltay, who was an Altay icon, were best friends.

== Honours ==
Altınordu

- İzmir Football League (6): 1926–27, 1931–32, 1934–35, 1935–36, (Note: Under the name of "Üçok". With persistence of "İzmir Reisi" Fazıl Güleç, then-governor and mayor of Izmir; Altınordu, Altay and Yüce -three Izmir-based sports clubs- constituted a combination team named "Üçok" to compete at Millî Küme between 1936 and 1937.) 1939–40, 1944–45

=== Individual ===
- National Division top scorer (1): 1937 (13 goals)

== See also ==
- List of one-club men in association football

== Bibliography ==
Books

- Yüce, Mehmet (2015). İdmancı Ruhlar: Futbol Tarihimizin Klasik Devreleri: 1923-1952 Türkiye Futbol Tarihi - 2. Cilt (in Turkish). Istanbul: İletişim Yayınları. ISBN 9789750516955.
