= Demirspor =

Demirspor clubs in Turkey are founded by the employees of the Turkish Railways (TCDD), similar to the Lokomotiv sports clubs of Eastern Europe. Most Demirspor clubs have jersey colours blue and navy, and bear the TCDD symbol on their logo. Adana Demirspor and Ankara Demirspor are the only Demirspor club that compete in the Turkish Professional Football League System, and Ankara Demirspor is the only club still affiliated with TCDD.

By 1942, there were 38 Demirspor clubs registered: Haydarpaşa, Derince, İzmit, Ankara, Irmak, Çankırı, Karabük, Çatalağzı, Balıkesir, Bandırma, Soma, Tavşanlı, Kayseri, Sivas, Samsun, Çetinkaya, Divrik, Malatya, Maden, Adana, Fevzipaşa, Mersin, İskenderun, Ulukışla, Afyon, Konya, İzmir, Manisa, Alaşehir, Nazilli, Çamlık, Sirkeci, Edirne, Erzurum, Sarıkamış, Erzincan, Eskişehir, Mudanya, Edremit.

== Sports Clubs ==
- Adana Demirspor
- Ankara Demirspor
- Eskişehir Demirspor
- İzmir Demirspor
- Sivas Demirspor
