= Ibrahim Bingöl =

Turkish footballer

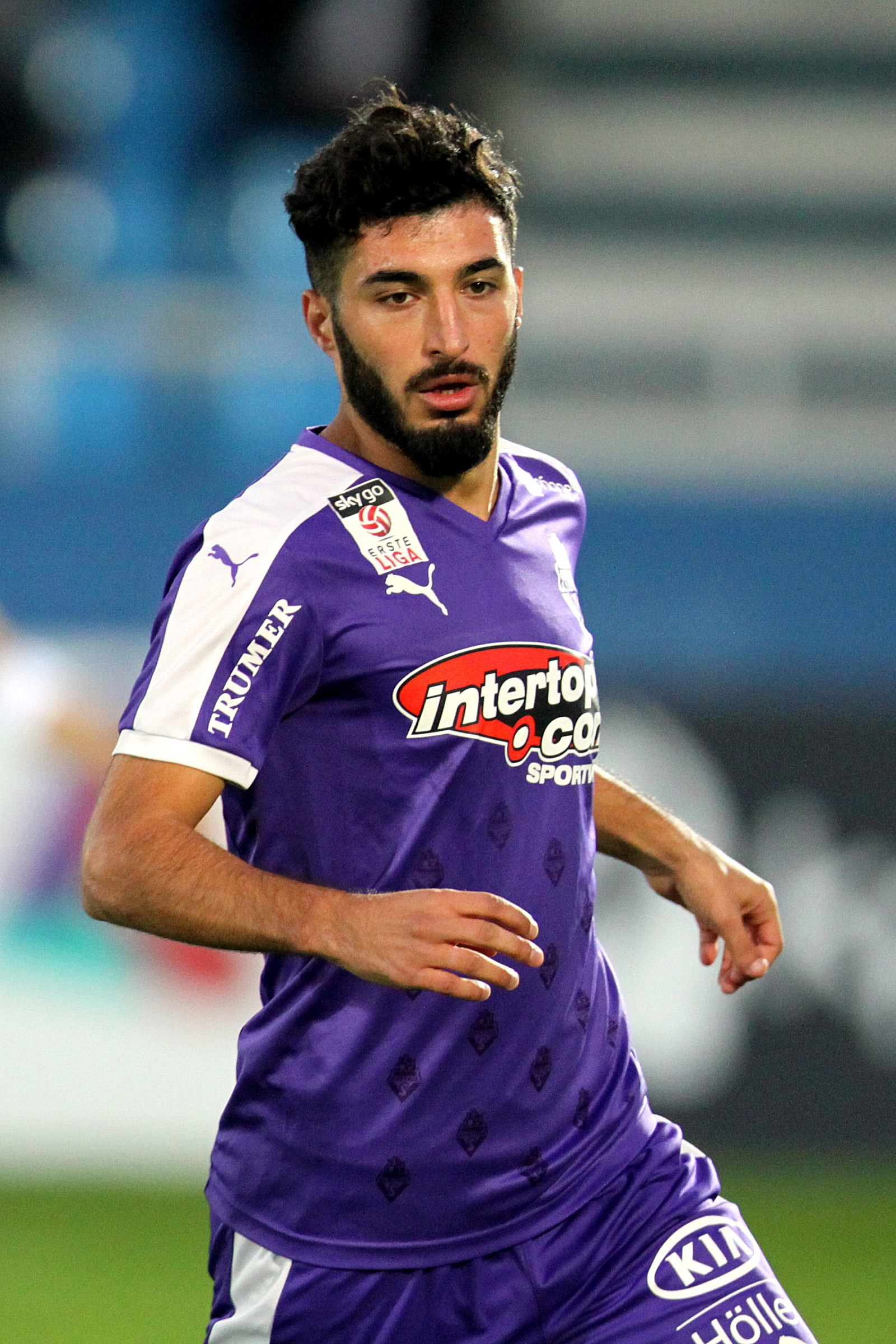

Personal information
- Date of birth: 24 September 1993 (age 33)
- Place of birth: Muş, Turkey
- Height: 1.81 m (5 ft 11 in)
- Position: Midfielder

Team information
- Current team: Ankara Demirspor
- Number: 70

Youth career
- 2002–2004: ASV Gösting
- 2004–2007: Sturm Graz
- 2007–2010: Union Ries-Kainbach
- 2010: FC Großklein

Senior career*
Years	Team	Apps	(Gls)
2010–2014	Kapfenberger SV	35	(5)
2014–2016	Austria Salzburg	47	(11)
2016	Wolfsberger AC	2	(0)
2016–2018	Keçiörengücü	3	(0)
2017–2018	→ Ankara Demirspor (loan)	20	(0)
2018–2019	Yeni Orduspor	3	(0)
2019–2020	Kapfenberger SV	18	(3)
2021	Ofspor	4	(0)
2021	SC Bruck/Mur	3	(0)
2021–2023	Vanspor	2	(0)
2024	Graz United		
2025–	Ankara Demirspor	0	(0)
- * Club domestic league appearances and goals as of 6 December 2025

Ibrahim Bingöl (born 24 September 1993) is an Austrian footballer of Kurdish descent who plays for Turkish TFF 2. Lig club Ankara Demirspor.
