= Turkish National Division =

Millî Küme
- Founded: 1937
- Folded: 1950
- Country: Turkey
- Number of clubs: 8
- Level on pyramid: 1
- Relegation to: None
- Domestic cup: Prime Minister's Cup
- Last champions: Fenerbahçe (6th title) (1950)
- Most championships: Fenerbahçe (6 titles)
- Most appearances: (Turkey) Cihat Arman (122)
- Top scorer: (Turkey) Hakkı Yeten (95 goals)

The National Division or National League (Turkish: Millî Küme) was a top-level football competition organised by the Turkish Football Federation, including the most successful teams from Istanbul, Ankara, and İzmir in Turkey. It was the first national league in Turkish football history. The league was played from 1937 to 1950.

The top four clubs from Istanbul and the top two clubs from the Ankara and İzmir regional leagues made up the league roster, since the leagues of these three major cities were the strongest in those decades. The matches in Ankara were played at 19 Mayıs Stadium, the matches in İzmir at Alsancak Stadium, and the matches in Istanbul at Taksim Stadium. The league was the most important and popular football competition in its era.

Fenerbahçe are the most successful club, having won six titles.

== History ==
The Turkish championship title of Fenerbahçe was announced in a Turkish newspaper one day after the conclusion of the 1950 edition.

Before the introduction of the National Division, the former Turkish Football Championship was held as a national championship in Turkey. Its tournament system was based on a knockout tournament, contested between the winners of each of the country's top regional leagues. In the late 1920s, the demand for a national football league was growing in the general Turkish public, which showed in the country's newspapers and magazines, where the European counterparts were given as examples. In 1937 that demand was fulfilled, as the Millî Küme was founded and began in March that year. Eligible for the league competition where the top placed teams of the Istanbul, Ankara, and İzmir regional leagues, which were the strongest leagues in those decades. An exception was made in 1941, when 1940 Turkish Football Championship winners Eskişehir Demirspor (the only club from outside the three major cities) and a third club from Ankara were included.

In 1940 the Turkish Football Federation decided to resume the Turkish Football Championship. As a result, both national championships were held at the same time from 1940 to 1950. The main differences between both tournaments were the competition systems and the qualification criteria. The National Division became the most popular and most important football competition in Turkey, overshadowing the Turkish Football Championship, since it was played in a league format with away matches. In 1944 a special super cup, the Prime Minister's Cup, was introduced by the TFF. It was competed by the winners of both championships. The Prime Minister's Cup was one of the earliest football super cups in the world. The cup was held in that format until 1950, when the National Division concluded.

== Competition format ==
There were eight clubs in the National Division. The four highest-placed teams in the Istanbul Football League and the top two teams from the Ankara League and İzmir League at the end of the season qualified for the National Division. The competition was played within a year, it started just after the conclusion of the aforementioned regional leagues. The competition format was based on a double round-robin system, that means each club played the others twice, once at their home stadium and once at that of their opponents', for 14 games. Teams received three points for a win, two points for a draw, and one point for a loss. No points were awarded for a forfeit/regulation loss. Teams were ranked by total points, then goal average (the number of goals scored divided by the number of goals conceded). There was no system of promotion and relegation, since the National Division was the only national league and there was no lower division.

== Champions ==
Name	Year	Winners	Runners-up
Millî Küme	1937	Fenerbahçe (1)	Galatasaray
Millî Küme	1938	Güneş (1)	Beşiktaş
Millî Küme	1939	Galatasaray (1)	Ankara Demirspor
Millî Küme	1940	Fenerbahçe (2)	Galatasaray
Millî Küme	1941	Beşiktaş (1)	Galatasaray
Millî Küme	1942	Not held as a result of the weather conditions and the delayed conclusion of the Istanbul League.	
Maarif Mükâfâtı	1943	Fenerbahçe (3)	Galatasaray
Maarif Mükâfâtı	1944	Beşiktaş (2)	Fenerbahçe
Millî Eğitim Kupası	1945	Fenerbahçe (4)	Beşiktaş
Millî Eğitim Kupası	1946	Fenerbahçe (5)	Beşiktaş
Millî Eğitim Kupası	1947	Beşiktaş (3)	Fenerbahçe
Millî Eğitim Kupası	1948	Not held due to the 1948 Summer Olympics in London.	
Millî Eğitim Kupası	1949	Not held due to the Mediterranean Cup.	
Millî Eğitim Kupası	1950	Fenerbahçe (6)	Galatasaray

== Performance by club ==
Club	Titles	Runners-up	Winning years
Fenerbahçe	6	2	1937, 1940, 1943, 1945, 1946, 1950
Beşiktaş	3	3	1941, 1944, 1947
Galatasaray	1	5	1939
Güneş	1	–	1938
Ankara Demirspor	–	1	–

== Player records ==
=== Top scorers ===
Rank	Player	Goals	Apps	Club(s)
1	Hakkı Yeten	95	118	Beşiktaş
2	Melih Kotanca	83	86	Güneş, Fenerbahçe
3	Şeref Görkey	75	107	Beşiktaş
4	Naci Bastoncu	56	117	Fenerbahçe
5	Said Altınordu	46	67	Altınordu
5	Selahattin Almay	46	61	Güneş, Galatasaray
7	Gündüz Kılıç	35	62	Galatasaray, Ankara Demirspor
8	Kemal Gülçelik	34	38	Beşiktaş
9	Şükrü Gülesin	33	64	Ankaragücü, Beşiktaş
10	Süleyman Tekil	32	47	Galatasaray, İstanbulspor

=== Most appearances ===
Rank	Player	Apps	Club(s)
1	Cihat Arman	122	Fenerbahçe
2	Hakkı Yeten	118	Beşiktaş
3	Naci Bastoncu	117	Fenerbahçe
4	Hüseyin Saygun	110	Beşiktaş, Vefa
5	Şeref Görkey	107	Beşiktaş
6	Mehmet Ali Tanman	97	Beşiktaş
7	Faruk Barlas	96	Güneş, Galatasaray
8	Ömer Boncuk	90	Güneş, Fenerbahçe
9	Melih Kotanca	86	Güneş, Fenerbahçe
10	Ahmet Erol	78	Muhafızgücü, Gençlerbirliği, Fenerbahçe

- All players are Turkish unless otherwise indicated.

== See also ==
- List of Turkish football champions
- Turkish Football Championship
- Turkish Super League
