= Hakkı =

Hakkı is a Turkish name, originating from the days of the Ottoman Empire.

Its direct translation is 'truth'. As a result of it being frequently used in the Ottoman Empire as a birth name, it has led to the name being given to children in Turkey and Cyprus.

The name itself was more common during the 17th century when the Turkish Empire was at its peak, but its frequency of use declined gradually in the following years. In the 20th century however, many Turkish parents began to find it a more modern and European name than that of Mehmet and Huseyin and as a result, the name again became popular in Turkey as well as European countries with sizeable Turkish communities, such as the United Kingdom, Germany and France.

People named Hakkı include:

- Hakkı Atun, former prime minister of the Turkish Republic of Northern Cyprus
- Hakkı Hocaoğlu, Turkish footballer
- Hakkı Keskin, Turkish-German politician
- Hakkı Ketenoğlu (1906–1977), Turkish judge
- Hakkı Yeten, (1910–1989), Turkish footballer
