= Cihat Arman =

Turkish football goalkeeper and manager (1915-1994)

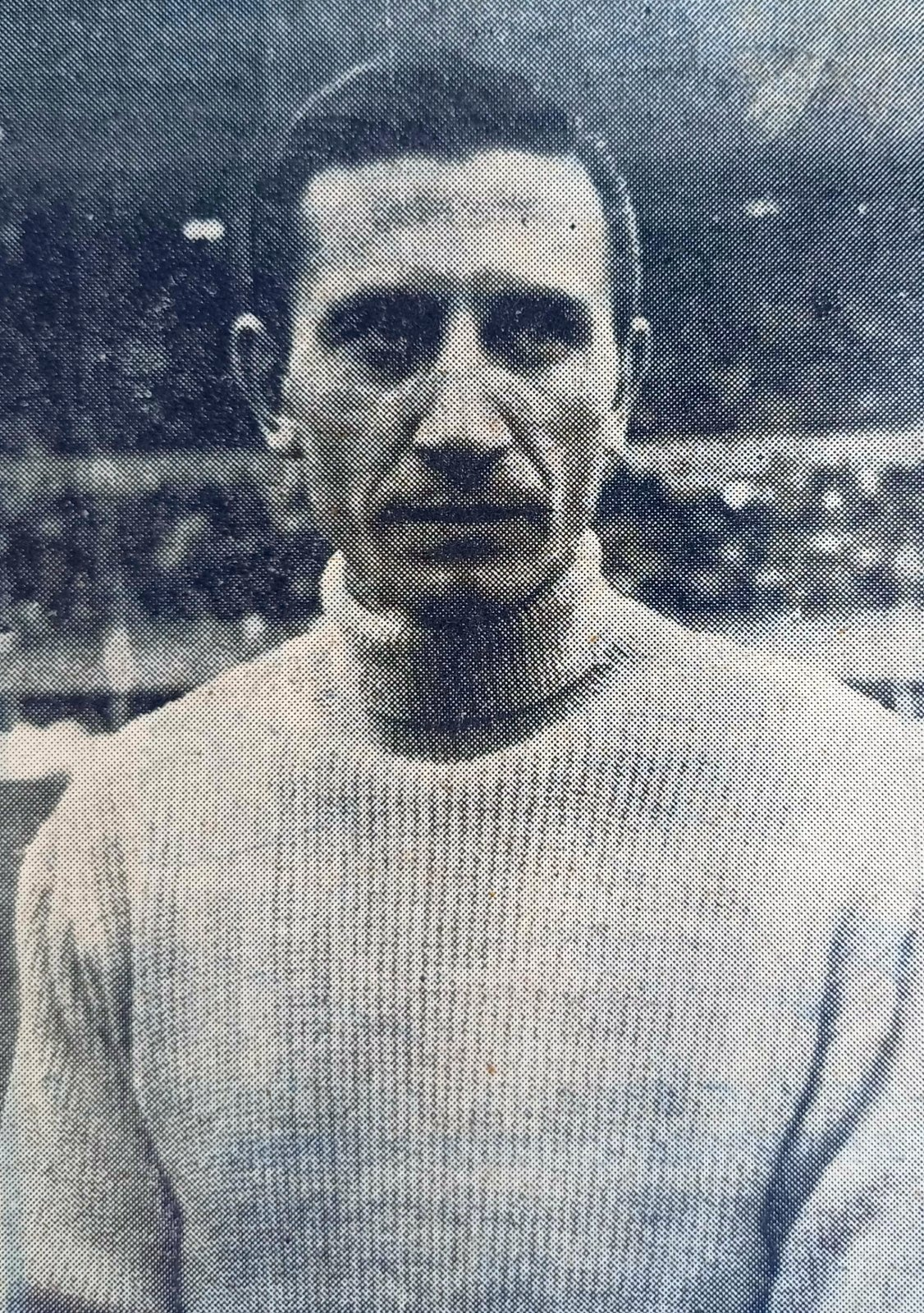
- Playing for Fenerbahçe in a match in 1949

Personal information
- Full name: Cihat Arman
- Date of birth: 16 July 1915
- Place of birth: Istanbul, Ottoman Empire
- Date of death: 14 May 1994 (aged 78)
- Place of death: Istanbul, Turkey
- Position: Goalkeeper

Senior career*
Years	Team	Apps	(Gls)
1934–1937	Gençlerbirliği	?	(?)
1937–1939	Güneş	18	(0)
1939–1951	Fenerbahçe	308	(0)

International career
1936–1951	Turkey	13	(0)

Managerial career
- 1948–49: Fenerbahçe
- 1949: Turkey
- 1954–55: Beyoğluspor
- 1955–56: Beşiktaş
- 1956: Turkey
- 1956–57: İstanbulspor
- 1957–60: Kasımpaşa
- 1960–61: İstanbulspor
- 1962–63: Yeşildirek
- 1964: Turkey
- 1966–67: Eskişehirspor
- 1967–68: Mersin İdmanyurdu
- 1968–69: Vefa
- 1970–71: Turkey
- * Club domestic league appearances and goals

Cihat Arman (16 July 1915 – 14 May 1994) was a Turkish football goalkeeper and manager. He represented Turkey at the 1936 Summer Olympics and the 1948 Summer Olympics. He was the coach of the Turkish national football team throughout 1949, and Turkey qualified for the 1950 World Cup as a result of victories in the qualifiers under his management. However, Turkish national football team could not participate in this tournament due to financial difficulties caused by the World War II. He was called "Yellow Canary" by the fans as he wore his Yellow Sweater in every match without exception, and this led to Fenerbahçe adopting the "Yellow Canaries" symbol.

== Biography ==
Arman started playing club football at the age of 15 and made his debut for Ankaragücü. In 1936, he transferred to the Istanbul club Güneş. After the closure of this club, he moved to Fenerbahçe, where he played 308 games in total. He was nicknamed the "flying goalkeeper" due to his acrobatic and successful saves. The sight of him flying wearing his yellow shirt was the inspiration behind "The Yellow Canaries" (Sarı Kanaryalar in Turkish), the nickname for the football team of Fenerbahçe.

During World War II, international competitions were rarely held. So, Arman played only 13 games with the Turkey national football team during this time. After 1949 he served as the goalkeeper and captain for the team. He also coached the Turkey national team which qualified for the 1950 World Cup, thrashing Syria 7–0; but Turkey withdrew due to financial problems.

After Arman retired from active sport in 1950, he coached the Istanbul clubs Kasımpaşa, İstanbulspor, Yeşildirek, Beşiktaş and the national team (1950, 1957, 1958 and 1959).
