= 1945 Turkish National Division =

Turkish National Division
- Season: 1945
- Champions: Fenerbahçe (4th title)
- Matches: 56
- Goals: 205 (3.66 per match)
- Top goalscorer: Melih Kotanca (17)

The 1945 National Division was the eighth edition of the Turkish National Division. Fenerbahçe won their fourth title.

== Participants ==
- Beşiktaş - Istanbul Football League, 1st
- Fenerbahçe - Istanbul Football League, 2nd
- Galatasaray - Istanbul Football League, 3rd
- Beykoz 1908 - Istanbul Football League, 4th
- Uçaksavar - Ankara Football League, 2nd
- Ankara Demirspor - Ankara Football League, 3rd
- Altınordu - İzmir Football League, 1st
- Karşıyaka - İzmir Football League, 2nd

== League standings ==
Pos	Team	Pld	W	D	L	GF	GA	GAv	Pts
1	Fenerbahçe	14	10	3	1	42	17	2.471	37
2	Beşiktaş	14	8	4	2	39	19	2.053	34
3	Galatasaray	14	7	4	3	33	13	2.538	32
4	Ankara Demirspor	14	7	3	4	23	23	1.000	31
5	Uçaksavar	14	5	5	4	24	30	0.800	29
6	Altınordu	14	3	1	10	16	28	0.571	21
7	Karşıyaka	14	1	4	9	14	33	0.424	20
8	Beykoz 1908	14	1	4	9	13	41	0.317	20

Rules for classification: 3 points for a win, 2 points for a draw, and 1 points for a loss.

== Results ==
Home \ Away	AND	ATO	BJK	BYK	FNB	GAL	KSK	UÇS
Ankara Demirspor		1–0	1–1	2–1	0–2	2–1	3–2	6–3
Altınordu	1–2		2–2	2–0	1–3	3–2	3–0	0–2
Beşiktaş	3–0	3–0		5–2	4–3	0–1	5–1	0–1
Beykoz 1908	1–0	4–0	3–4		0–4	1–3	4–2	0–0
Fenerbahçe	4–1	5–1	3–3	5–0		1–1	2–1	2–0
Galatasaray	1–1	3–0	1–1	0–0	2–3		7–0	1–0
Karşıyaka	1–1	2–1	0–3	0–0	2–2	0–3		1–1
Uçaksavar	2–3	4–0	2–5	1–0	1–4	1–7	6–1	

Legend: Blue = home team win; Yellow = draw; Red = away team win.
