= 1937–38 Istanbul Football League =

Istanbul Football League
- Season: 1937–38
- Champions: Güneş SK (1st title)

The 1937–38 İstanbul Football League season was the 30th season of the league. Güneş SK won the league for the first time.

== Season ==
Pos	Team	Pld	W	D	L	GF	GA	GD	Pts
1	Güneş SK	9	6	2	1	31	8	+23	24 (Note: 1 bonus point?)
2	Fenerbahçe SK	9	7	1	1	40	11	+29	24
3	Beşiktaş JK	9	6	3	0	44	12	+32	24
4	Galatasaray SK	9	5	2	2	36	20	+16	21
5	Vefa SK	9	4	1	4	20	21	−1	18
6	Beykoz 1908 S.K.D.	9	3	3	3	13	16	−3	18
7	İstanbulspor	9	2	2	5	13	22	−9	15
8	Küçükçekmece SK	9	1	1	7	9	30	−21	12
9	Topkapı SK	9	1	1	7	9	36	−27	12
10	Eyüpspor	9	1	2	6	10	49	−39	12 (Note: 1 point deducted?)
