= 1940 Turkish National Division =

Turkish National Division
- Season: 1940
- Champions: Fenerbahçe (2nd title)
- Matches played: 56
- Goals scored: 264 (4.71 per match)
- Top goalscorer: Melih Kotanca (23)

The 1940 National Division was the fourth edition of the Turkish National Division. Fenerbahçe won their second title.

== Participating clubs ==
- Beşiktaş - Istanbul Football League, 1st
- Fenerbahçe - Istanbul Football League, 2nd
- Galatasaray - Istanbul Football League, 3rd
- Vefa - Istanbul Football League, 4th
- Gençlerbirliği - Ankara Football League, 1st
- Muhafızgücü - Ankara Football League, 2nd
- Altınordu - İzmir Football League, 1st
- Altay - İzmir Football League, 2nd

== League table ==
Pos	Team	Pld	W	D	L	GF	GA	GAv	Pts
1	Fenerbahçe	14	11	2	1	49	17	2.882	38
2	Galatasaray	14	9	2	3	45	19	2.368	34
3	Muhafızgücü	14	6	2	6	35	30	1.167	28
4	Gençlerbirliği	14	7	0	7	31	27	1.148	28
5	Beşiktaş	14	5	3	6	37	40	0.925	27
6	Altay	14	4	4	6	24	42	0.571	26
7	Altınordu	14	4	1	9	23	44	0.523	23
8	Vefa	14	2	2	10	20	45	0.444	20

Rules for classification: 3 points for a win, 2 points for a draw, and 1 points for a loss.

== Results ==
Home \ Away	ALT	ATO	BJK	FNB	GAL	GEN	MUH	VEF
Altay		2–2	1–1	0–2	5–4	1–0	2–1	2–1
Altınordu	6–1		2–3	1–2	1–0	0–1	1–6	3–2
Beşiktaş	5–0	3–4		2–5	2–9	2–0	4–2	2–2
Fenerbahçe	9–2	7–0	2–1		3–2	3–1	3–1	5–2
Galatasaray	2–1	3–0	4–4	1–1		5–0	4–0	3–0
Gençlerbirliği	5–3	5–0	4–2	2–1	0–1		1–3	7–1
Muhafızgücü	2–2	5–0	4–3	2–2	0–2	5–3		1–2
Vefa	2–2	4–3	1–3	0–4	2–5	0–2	1–3	

Legend: Blue = home team win; Yellow = draw; Red = away team win.
