= 1946 Turkish National Division =

Turkish National Division
- Season: 1946
- Champions: Fenerbahçe (5th title)
- Matches played: 30
- Goals scored: 139 (4.63 per match)
- Top goalscorer: Melih Kotanca (12)

The 1946 National Division was the ninth edition of the Turkish National Division. Fenerbahçe won their fifth title.

== Istanbul qualifying round ==
Top four in İstanbul played a mini league to decide which two İstanbul clubs would play in the Milli Eğitim Kupası.

Pos	Team	Pld	W	D	L	GF	GA	GAv	Pts
1	Beşiktaş J.K. (Q)	6	4	1	1	–	–	—	13
2	Fenerbahçe (Q)	6	3	2	1	–	–	—	11
3	Vefa SK	6	2	1	3	–	–	—	7
4	Galatasaray SK	6	0	2	4	–	–	—	2

(Q) Qualified for the phase indicated

== Participants ==
- Beşiktaş - Istanbul Football League, 1st
- Fenerbahçe - Istanbul Football League, 2nd
- Gençlerbirliği - Ankara Football League, 1st
- Muhafızgücü - Ankara Football League, 2nd
- UDV Göztepe - İzmir Football League
- Kayagücü - İzmir Football League

== League standings ==
Pos	Team	Pld	W	D	L	GF	GA	GAv	Pts
1	Fenerbahçe	10	9	0	1	30	7	4.286	28
2	Beşiktaş	10	7	2	1	32	15	2.133	26
3	Kayagücü	10	3	2	5	19	28	0.679	18
4	Muhafızgücü	10	3	0	7	24	31	0.774	16
5	UDV Göztepe	10	2	2	6	18	27	0.667	16
6	Gençlerbirliği	10	3	0	7	15	30	0.500	16

Rules for classification: 3 points for a win, 2 points for a draw, and 1 points for a loss.

== Results ==
Home \ Away	BJK	FNB	GEN	KAY	MUH	GÖZ
Beşiktaş		2–1	4–2	8–0	4–3	6–1
Fenerbahçe	3–1		3–0	4–1	4–0	5–1
Gençlerbirliği	2–0	1–2		1–2	2–1	3–2
Kayagücü	0–2	0–2	3–0		3–2	5–1
Muhafızgücü	3–5	0–4	5–2	7–4		3–1
UDV Göztepe	0–0	1–2	8–2	1–1	2–1	

Legend: Blue = home team win; Yellow = draw; Red = away team win.
