= 1947 Turkish National Division =

Turkish National Division
- Season: 1947
- Champions: Beşiktaş (3rd title)
- Matches played: 56
- Goals scored: 223 (3.98 per match)
- Top goalscorer: İsmet Artun & Şükrü Gülesin (11)

The 1947 National Division was the tenth edition of the Turkish National Division. Beşiktaş won their third title.

== Participants ==
- Fenerbahçe - Istanbul Football League, 1st
- Vefa - Istanbul Football League, 2nd
- Beşiktaş - Istanbul Football League, 3rd
- Galatasaray - Istanbul Football League, 4th
- Ankara Demirspor - Ankara Football League, 1st
- Gençlerbirliği - Ankara Football League, 2nd
- Altay - İzmir Football League, 2nd
- Altınordu - İzmir Football League, 3rd

== League standings ==
Pos	Team	Pld	W	D	L	GF	GA	GAv	Pts
1	Beşiktaş	14	10	3	1	39	12	3.250	37
2	Fenerbahçe	14	9	3	2	41	21	1.952	35
3	Galatasaray	14	6	5	3	32	20	1.600	31
4	Vefa	14	6	4	4	29	23	1.261	30
5	Ankara Demirspor	14	6	3	5	28	25	1.120	29
6	Gençlerbirliği	14	2	5	7	19	32	0.594	23
7	Altınordu	14	2	2	10	18	38	0.474	20
8	Altay	14	2	1	11	18	53	0.340	19

Rules for classification: 3 points for a win, 2 points for a draw, and 1 points for a loss.

== Results ==
Home \ Away	AND	ALT	ATO	BJK	FNB	GAL	GEN	VEF
Ankara Demirspor		5–0	1–0	1–1	1–1	3–3	3–0	1–3
Altay	5–1		5–3	0–4	3–6	1–2	1–1	1–3
Altınordu	0–3	2–1		0–2	2–2	3–7	1–0	1–4
Beşiktaş	4–1	9–0	2–0		2–1	1–1	3–1	1–0
Fenerbahçe	3–4	6–1	2–0	4–0		2–1	3–0	3–1
Galatasaray	2–1	6–0	2–0	1–3	1–2		3–1	2–2
Gençlerbirliği	2–3	3–0	3–3	1–6	2–2	0–0		3–3
Vefa	1–0	2–0	4–2	1–1	3–4	1–1	1–2	

Legend: Blue = home team win; Yellow = draw; Red = away team win.
