= 1943 Turkish National Division =

Turkish National Division
- Season: 1943
- Champions: Fenerbahçe (3rd title)
- Matches played: 56
- Goals scored: 212 (3.79 per match)
- Top goalscorer: Şeref Görkey (13)

The 1943 National Division was the sixth edition of the Turkish National Division. Fenerbahçe won their third title.

== Participants ==
- Beşiktaş - Istanbul Football League, 1st
- Fenerbahçe - Istanbul Football League, 2nd
- Galatasaray - Istanbul Football League, 3rd
- Vefa - Istanbul Football League, 4th
- Ankara Demirspor - Ankara Football League, 1st
- Gençlerbirliği - Ankara Football League, 2nd
- UDV Göztepe - İzmir Football League, 1st
- Altınordu - İzmir Football League, 2nd

== League standings ==
Pos	Team	Pld	W	D	L	GF	GA	GAv	Pts
1	Fenerbahçe	14	11	2	1	30	6	5.000	24
2	Galatasaray	14	11	1	2	32	7	4.571	23
3	Beşiktaş	14	9	0	5	47	20	2.350	18
4	Ankara Demirspor	14	7	2	5	29	29	1.000	16
5	Vefa	14	5	1	8	23	35	0.657	11
6	Gençlerbirliği	14	4	1	9	23	31	0.742	9
7	UDV Göztepe	14	3	3	8	12	35	0.343	9
8	Altınordu	14	1	0	13	16	49	0.327	2

Source: angelfire.com and rsssf.com

== Results ==
Home \ Away	ATO	AND	BJK	FNB	GAL	GEN	GÖZ	VEF
Altınordu		0–1	2–0	1–2	2–4	1–5	0–1	1–2
Ankara Demirspor	4–1		2–8	2–2	1–0	5–1	5–1	2–3
Beşiktaş	9–0	5–1		1–4	1–3	5–1	3–0	5–1
Fenerbahçe	5–0	2–0	1–0		1–0	3–0	2–0	4–0
Galatasaray	4–0	3–0	3–1	0–0		2–1	1–0	3–0
Gençlerbirliği	4–3	2–3	0–3	0–1	0–1		5–0	1–2
UDV Göztepe	2–1	1–1	1–4	2–1	0–4	1–1		2–2
Vefa	6–4	0–2	1–2	0–2	0–4	1–2	5–1	

Legend: Blue = home team win; Yellow = draw; Red = away team win.
