= 1950 Turkish National Division =

Turkish National Division
- Season: 1950
- Champions: Fenerbahçe (6th title)
- Matches played: 56
- Goals scored: 187 (3.34 per match)
- Top goalscorer: Lefter Küçükandonyadis (14)

The 1950 National Division was the 11th and last edition of the Turkish National Division. Fenerbahçe won their sixth title.

== Participants ==
- Beşiktaş - Istanbul Football League, 1st
- Fenerbahçe - Istanbul Football League, 2nd
- Galatasaray - Istanbul Football League, 3rd
- Vefa - Istanbul Football League, 4th
- Gençlerbirliği - Ankara Football League, 1st
- Ankara Demirspor - Ankara Football League, 2nd
- Göztepe - İzmir Football League, 1st
- Altay - İzmir Football League, 2nd

== League standings ==
Pos	Team	Pld	W	D	L	GF	GA	GAv	Pts
1	Fenerbahçe	14	8	5	1	35	9	3.889	35
2	Galatasaray	14	7	7	0	19	5	3.800	35
3	Beşiktaş	14	8	4	2	31	16	1.938	34
4	Vefa	14	7	4	3	29	16	1.813	32
5	Ankara Demirspor	14	4	5	5	28	27	1.037	27
6	Gençlerbirliği	14	3	4	7	18	35	0.514	24
7	Altay	14	2	2	10	16	33	0.485	20
8	Göztepe	14	1	1	12	11	46	0.239	17

Rules for classification: 3 points for a win, 2 points for a draw, and 1 points for a loss.

== Results ==
Home \ Away	AND	ALT	BJK	FNB	GAL	GEN	GÖZ	VEF
Ankara Demirspor		5–3	1–3	1–1	0–3	2–2	2–0	1–1
Altay	2–2		1–4	0–4	0–0	3–0	4–1	1–3
Beşiktaş	5–2	1–0		0–2	1–1	0–1	3–2	2–1
Fenerbahçe	2–2	3–1	1–1		0–0	6–0	8–0	1–2
Galatasaray	3–0	1–0	1–1	0–0		5–2	1–0	1–0
Gençlerbirliği	1–6	4–1	1–3	0–1	0–0		1–1	2–2
Göztepe	0–4	3–0	1–6	2–4	0–2	0–1		0–4
Vefa	1–0	2–0	1–1	0–2	1–1	5–3	6–1	

Legend: Blue = home team win; Yellow = draw; Red = away team win.
