= 1937 Turkish National Division =

Turkish National Division
- Season: 1937
- Champions: Fenerbahçe (1st title)
- Matches: 56
- Goals: 237 (4.23 per match)
- Top goalscorer: Said Altınordu (13)

The 1937 National Division was the first edition of the Turkish National Division. For the first time in Turkish football history the strongest clubs from the major regional leagues played against each other in a national league. Fenerbahçe won their first title.

== Participants ==
- Fenerbahçe - Istanbul Football League, 1st
- Güneş - Istanbul Football League, 2nd
- Galatasaray - Istanbul Football League, 3rd
- Beşiktaş - Istanbul Football League, 4th
- MKE Ankaragücü - Ankara Football League, 1st
- Gençlerbirliği - Ankara Football League, 2nd
- Üçok (an alliance between Altay, Altınordu, and Bucaspor) - İzmir Football League
- Doğanspor (an alliance between Göztepe, İzmirspor, and Egespor) - İzmir Football League

== League standings ==
Pos	Team	Pld	W	D	L	GF	GA	GAv	Pts
1	Fenerbahçe	14	10	2	2	34	16	2.125	36
2	Galatasaray	14	8	4	2	39	24	1.625	34
3	Beşiktaş	14	5	5	4	22	19	1.158	29
4	Güneş	14	5	4	5	33	27	1.222	28
5	Gençlerbirliği	14	5	2	7	25	28	0.893	26
6	MKE Ankaragücü	14	5	2	7	30	34	0.882	26
7	Doğanspor	14	4	2	8	28	48	0.583	24
8	Üçok	14	2	3	9	26	41	0.634	21

Rules for classification: 3 points for a win, 2 points for a draw, and 1 points for a loss.

== Results ==
Home \ Away	AGÜ	BJK	DOĞ	FNB	GAL	GEN	GÜN	ÜÇO
Ankaragücü		0–1	5–1	1–4	3–4	4–0	1–6	2–2
Beşiktaş	3–1		2–2	2–1	1–3	2–2	1–1	4–1
Doğanspor	2–3	1–1		4–3	2–3	2–0	5–3	4–2
Fenerbahçe	2–0	1–0	6–0		2–1	2–1	4–2	1–0
Galatasaray	2–4	2–2	5–0	0–0		2–0	2–2	7–3
Gençlerbirliği	4–2	2–1	6–1	1–2	2–3		0–2	2–1
Güneş	1–2	1–2	3–1	1–3	1–1	3–3		3–1
Üçok	2–2	1–0	6–3	3–3	2–4	1–2	1–4	

Legend: Blue = home team win; Yellow = draw; Red = away team win.
