= 1947–48 Istanbul Football League =

Istanbul Football League
- Season: 1947–48
- Champions: Fenerbahçe SK (12th title)

The 1947–48 İstanbul Football League season was the 40th season of the league. Fenerbahçe SK won the league for the 12th time.

== Season ==
Pos	Team	Pld	W	D	L	GF	GA	GD	Pts
1	Fenerbahçe SK	14	13	1	0	49	14	+35	41
2	Beşiktaş J.K.	14	11	0	3	37	15	+22	36
3	Galatasaray S.K.	14	8	2	4	30	19	+11	32
4	Vefa SK	14	7	2	5	20	15	+5	30
5	Kasımpaşa SK	14	3	4	7	21	29	−8	24
6	İstanbulspor	14	2	5	7	16	28	−12	23
7	Küçükçekmece SK	14	3	2	9	10	26	−16	22
8	Beykoz 1908 S.K.D.	14	0	2	12	10	47	−37	16
