= 1938–39 Istanbul Football League =

Istanbul Football League
- Season: 1938–39
- Champions: Beşiktaş JK (3rd title)

The 1938–39 İstanbul Football League season was the 31st season of the league. Beşiktaş JK won the league for the third time.

== Season ==
Pos	Team	Pld	W	D	L	GF	GA	GD	Pts
1	Beşiktaş JK	18	15	3	0	69	15	+54	51
2	Fenerbahçe SK	18	14	3	1	81	13	+68	49
3	Galatasaray SK	18	11	5	2	52	20	+32	45
4	Vefa SK	18	10	3	5	39	24	+15	41
5	Beykoz 1908 S.K.D.	18	7	4	7	48	35	+13	36
6	Hilal SK	18	5	2	11	27	61	−34	30
7	Küçükçekmece SK	18	5	3	10	20	46	−26	29 (Note: 2 points deducted?)
8	Topkapı SK	18	4	0	14	19	73	−54	28 (Note: 2 bonus points?)
9	İstanbulspor	18	3	2	13	21	52	−31	23 (Note: 3 points deducted?)
10	Güneş SK	18	3	1	14	8	45	−37	11 (Note: 14 points deducted?)
