= 1944 Turkish National Division =

Turkish National Division
- Season: 1944
- Champions: Beşiktaş (2nd title)
- Matches: 56
- Goals: 191 (3.41 per match)
- Top goalscorer: Hakkı Yeten & Kemal Gülçelik (15)

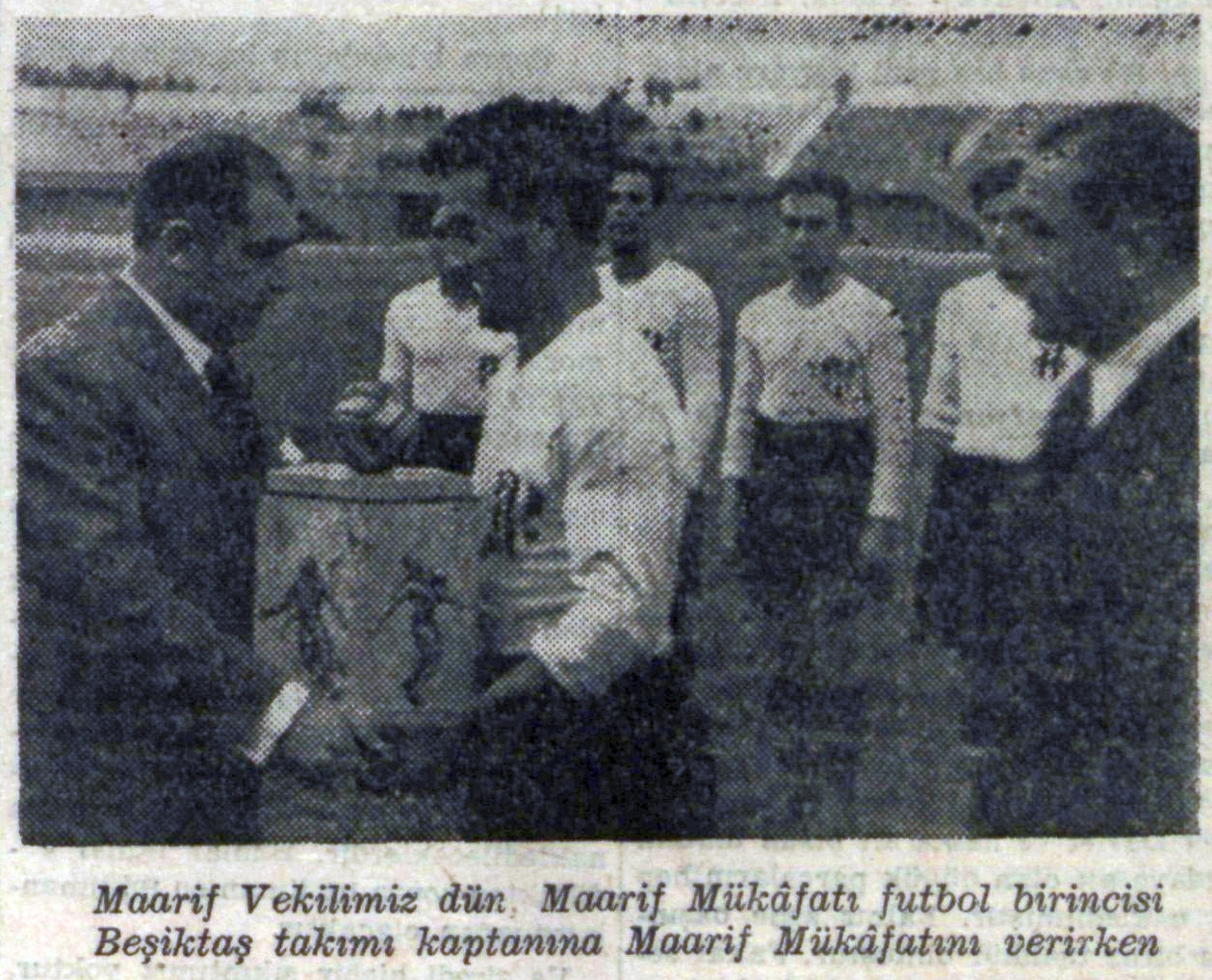

The 1944 National Division was the seventh edition of the Turkish National Division. Beşiktaş won their second title.

== Participants ==
- Fenerbahçe - Istanbul Football League, 1st
- Beşiktaş - Istanbul Football League, 2nd
- Vefa - Istanbul Football League, 4th
- İstanbulspor - Istanbul Football League, 5th
- Harp Okulu - Ankara Football League, 1st
- AS-FA Ankaragücü - Ankara Football League, 2nd
- UDV Göztepe - İzmir Football League, 1st
- Karşıyaka - İzmir Football League, 2nd

== League standings ==
Pos	Team	Pld	W	D	L	GF	GA	GAv	Pts
1	Beşiktaş	14	12	1	1	52	11	4.727	25
2	Fenerbahçe	14	10	1	3	26	11	2.364	21
3	UDV Göztepe	14	5	5	4	23	22	1.045	15
4	Harp Okulu	14	6	1	7	22	26	0.846	13
5	AS-FA Ankaragücü	14	6	0	8	23	24	0.958	12
6	Vefa	14	5	2	7	16	27	0.593	12
7	İstanbulspor	14	2	3	9	16	35	0.457	7
8	Karşıyaka	14	3	1	10	13	35	0.371	7

== Results ==
Home \ Away	AGÜ	BJK	FNB	HAR	İST	KSK	GÖZ	VEF
Ankaragücü		2–3	1–3	1–2	3–0	4–0	4–2	2–1
Beşiktaş	4–1		4–0	0–1	8–0	7–1	3–1	3–0
Fenerbahçe	1–0	1–2		3–0	2–0	3–0	3–0	1–0
Harp Okulu	3–0	3–6	0–2		3–0	4–1	2–2	0–2
İstanbulspor	1–2	1–3	0–3	4–1		2–0	2–2	1–1
Karşıyaka	0–1	0–0	0–1	3–2	3–2		1–3	2–1
UDV Göztepe	2–1	0–2	1–1	2–0	1–1	3–1		4–1
Vefa	2–1	0–7	3–2	0–1	3–2	2–1	0–0	

Legend: Blue = home team win; Yellow = draw; Red = away team win.

== See also ==
- 1944 Prime Minister's Cup
- 1944 Turkish Football Championship
