= 1933–34 Istanbul Football League =

Istanbul Football League
- Season: 1933–34
- Champions: Beşiktaş JK (2nd title)

The 1933–34 İstanbul Football League season was the 26th season of the league. Beşiktaş JK won the league for the second time.

== Season ==
Pos	Team	Pld	W	D	L	GF	GA	GD	Pts
1	Beşiktaş JK	12	8	3	1	29	16	+13	31
2	Fenerbahçe SK	12	8	2	2	28	8	+20	30
3	Galatasaray SK	12	6	3	3	21	14	+7	27
4	İstanbulspor	12	5	1	6	21	17	+4	23
5	Vefa SK	12	5	0	7	16	24	−8	22
6	Beykoz 1908 S.K.D.	12	3	3	6	17	26	−9	21
7	Küçükçekmece SK	12	0	2	10	10	37	−27	14
