= 1934–35 Istanbul Football League =

Istanbul Football League
- Season: 1934–35
- Champions: Fenerbahçe SK (7th title)

The 1934–35 İstanbul Football League season was the 27th season of the league. Fenerbahçe SK won the league for the 7th time.

== Season ==
Pos	Team	Pld	W	D	L	GF	GA	GD	Pts
1	Fenerbahçe SK	12	9	2	1	50	15	+35	31 (Note: 1 point deducted?)
2	Galatasaray SK	12	9	1	2	35	9	+26	31
3	Beşiktaş JK	12	8	1	3	31	12	+19	29
4	İstanbulspor	12	5	2	5	18	19	−1	24
5	Vefa SK	12	4	1	7	25	23	+2	21
6	Beykoz 1908 S.K.D.	12	2	2	8	18	52	−34	18
7	Küçükçekmece SK	12	0	2	10	4	51	−47	13 (Note: 1 point deducted?)
