= 1929–30 Istanbul Football League =

Istanbul Football League
- Season: 1929–30
- Champions: Fenerbahçe SK (5th title)

The 1929–30 İstanbul Football League season was the 22nd season of the league. Fenerbahçe SK won the league for the 5th time.

== Season ==
| Pos | Team | Pld | W | D | L | GF | GA | GD | Pts |
|---|---|---|---|---|---|---|---|---|---|
| 1 | Fenerbahçe SK | 10 | 8 | 2 | 0 | 39 | 15 | +24 | 28 |
| 2 | Galatasaray SK | 10 | 6 | 3 | 1 | 30 | 11 | +19 | 25 |
| 3 | Beşiktaş JK | 10 | 6 | 2 | 2 | 23 | 13 | +10 | 24 |
| 4 | Vefa SK | 10 | 3 | 0 | 7 | 19 | 27 | −8 | 16 |
| 5 | İstanbulspor | 10 | 3 | 0 | 7 | 15 | 37 | −22 | 16 |
| 6 | Beykoz 1908 S.K.D. | 10 | 0 | 1 | 9 | 11 | 34 | −23 | 11 |
