= 1932–33 Istanbul Football League =

Istanbul Football League
- Season: 1932–33
- Champions: Fenerbahçe SK (6th title)

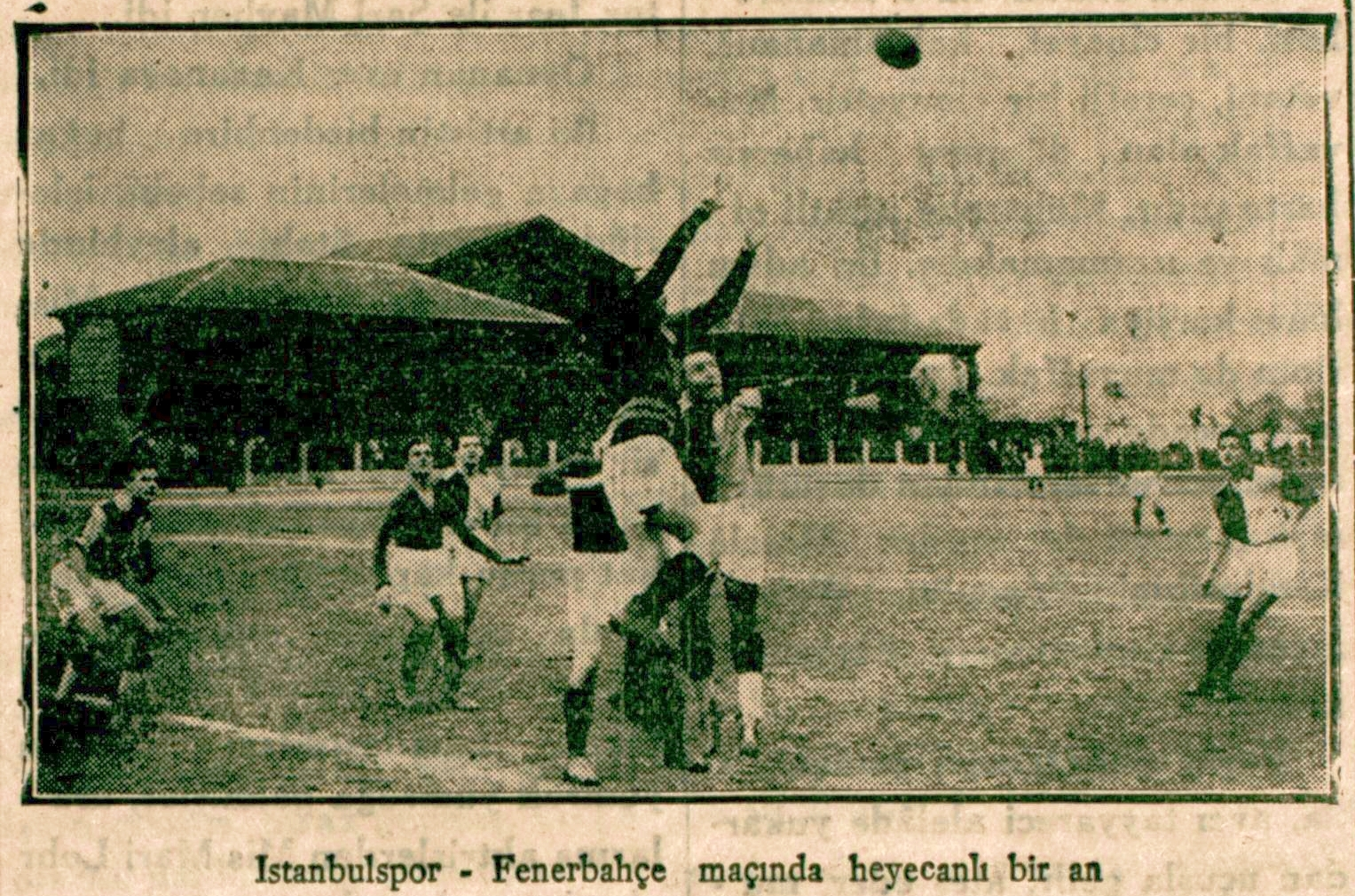
The Fenerbahçe-İstanbulspor match in the Vakit newspaper, February 4, 1933.

The 1932–33 İstanbul Football League season was the 25th season of the league. Fenerbahçe SK won the league for the 6th time.

== Season ==
Pos	Team	Pld	W	D	L	GF	GA	GD	Pts
1	Fenerbahçe SK	12	10	2	0	32	8	+24	34
2	Beşiktaş JK	12	8	2	2	24	7	+17	29 (Note: 1 point deducted?)
3	İstanbulspor	12	4	5	3	14	10	+4	25
4	Vefa SK	12	3	3	6	10	24	−14	21
5	Galatasaray SK	12	3	2	7	18	27	−9	20
6	Küçükçekmece SK	12	2	4	6	20	7	+13	17 (Note: 3 points deducted?)
7	Beykoz 1908 S.K.D.	12	1	4	7	17	29	−12	18
