= 1945 Istanbul Football Cup =

Istanbul Football Cup
- Season: 1945
- Champions: Fenerbahçe SK (1st Title)

The 1945 Istanbul Football Cup season was the 4th season of the cup. Fenerbahçe SK won the cup for the first time. The tournament was single-elimination.

== Season ==
=== Quarterfinals ===
| Team 1 | Score | Team 2 |
|---|---|---|
| Fenerbahçe SK (Turkey) | 5-0 | (Turkey) Anadolu Hisarı İdman Yurdu SK |
| Fenerbahçe SK (Turkey) | 4-0 | (Turkey) Elektrik SK |

=== Semifinals ===
| Team 1 | Score | Team 2 |
|---|---|---|
| Fenerbahçe SK (Turkey) | 0-0 | (Turkey) Galatasaray SK |
| Galatasaray SK (Turkey) | 0-3 | (Turkey) Fenerbahçe SK |

=== Final ===
The cup took place on November 16, 1945. Around 15,000 people attended at the Şeref Stadium.

| Team 1 | Score | Team 2 |
|---|---|---|
| Beşiktaş JK (Turkey) | 0-1 | (Turkey) Fenerbahçe SK |

Goal for Fenerbahçe SK: Naci Bastoncu(2 min.)
