= 1936–37 Istanbul Football League =

Istanbul Football League
- Season: 1936–37
- Champions: Fenerbahçe SK (9th title)

The 1936–37 İstanbul Football League season was the 29th season of the league. Fenerbahçe SK won the league for the 9th time.

== Season ==
Pos	Team	Pld	W	D	L	GF	GA	GD	Pts
1	Fenerbahçe SK	11	11	0	0	47	1	+46	33
2	Güneş SK	11	8	2	1	32	6	+26	29
3	Galatasaray SK	11	8	1	2	43	10	+33	28
4	Beşiktaş JK	11	8	1	2	39	12	+27	28
5	Beykoz 1908 S.K.D.	11	3	4	4	22	22	0	21
6	Vefa SK	11	4	2	5	27	27	0	21
7	Eyüpspor	11	3	2	6	13	40	−27	19
8	Küçükçekmece SK	11	3	2	6	22	26	−4	18 (Note: 1 point deducted?)
9	İstanbulspor	11	2	3	6	22	30	−8	18
10	Topkapı SK	11	3	1	7	26	49	−23	18
11	Üsküdar Anadolu SK	11	4	0	7	16	33	−17	18 (Note: 1 point deducted?)
12	Hilal SK	11	0	0	11	7	60	−53	10 (Note: 1 point deducted?)
