= Güneş S.K. =

Güneş SK
- Full name: Güneş Spor Kulübü
- Founded: 1933 as Ateş-Güneş
- Dissolved: 1938
- Ground: Taksim Stadium; Istanbul, Turkey
Home colours

Güneş SK was a Turkish sports club based in Istanbul, Turkey. They were founded in October 1933 as a breakaway club from Galatasaray and had the same colors, yellow and red. The club's name was Ateş-Güneş (Turkish for "Fire-Sun") initially, which soon became Güneş. They were one of the strongest teams in the 1930s, having won the Istanbul Football League in the 1937–38 season and the National League in 1938.

== History ==
Conflicts within the club of Galatasaray, which initially began in 1929–30, reached their peak in 1933. After one official was banned from the club, state of things worsened and several other officials and club members resigned as a result. Eventually Yusuf Ziya Öniş, who served as the chairman of the club for a period, also resigned that year for the same reasons. The 25 members who left the club rallied to Yusuf Ziya Öniş and planned to found a new club. The plan was carried into effect in October 1935 with Cevat Abbas as the first president. The new club's name was decided as Ateş-Güneş (Turkish for "Fire-Sun"), which soon became Güneş ("Sun") after a proposal by Mustafa Kemal Atatürk.

After a short period of time only, the club of Güneş gained considerable success and became the feared opponent of the major Istanbul clubs. Since Güneş consisted of several former Galatasaray members, a special rivalry developed between both teams. They experienced their golden age in the 1937–38 season, when they became Istanbul League champions and National League champions as well. It was also the same year, only five years after their foundation, that the club dissolved unexpectedly.

On 20 March 1938, Güneş achieved the club's highest win against Galatasaray defeating them 7–0 at Taksim Stadium. Four goals were scored by Melih Kotanca, two by Salahattin Almay and one goal was scored by Rasih Minkari. It is the highest goal difference in a football match between the two clubs and the highest defeat in the history of Galatasaray in domestic competitions.

== Honours ==
- Turkish National Division
  - Winners (1): 1938
  - Fourth (1): 1937
- Istanbul Football League
  - Winners (1): 1937–38
  - Runners-up (1): 1936–37
  - Fifth (1): 1935–36
