= Ankara Demirspor =

Turkish football club

- Full name: Ankara Demirspor
- Founded: 1930; 96 years ago
- Ground: TCDD Ankara Demirspor Stadium, Ankara
- Capacity: 3,000
- Chairman: İsmet Duman
- Manager: Bülent Akan
- League: TFF 2. Lig
- 2025–26: TFF 2. Lig, Red, 9th of 18
- Website: http://www.demirspor.org.tr/
Home colours	Away colours

Ankara Demirspor is a Turkish professional football club based in Ankara. They compete in the TFF Second League. They were one of the Super League's founding members in 1959. By winning the former Turkish Football Championship in 1947, they became Turkish champions for the first and only time. They played 13 seasons in the Süper Lig but were relegated to the Second League in 1971 and have never returned to the top division.

Ankara Demirspor is one of the 38 Demirspor clubs in Turkey that are founded by the employees of the Turkish Railways (TCDD), similar to the Lokomotiv sports clubs of Eastern Europe. Most Demirspor clubs have jersey colours identical to Ankara Demirspor, and bear the TCDD symbol on their logo. Ankara Demirspor and Adana Demirspor are the only Demirspor clubs that compete in the Turkish Professional Football League System, and Ankara Demirspor is the only one that is still affiliated with TCDD.

== History ==
The club was founded on March 16, 1930. Today, the colours of the club are navy blue, blue, and white. The former colours of the team were red and green.

== League participations ==
- Turkish Super League: 1958–71
- TFF First League: 1971–83, 1995–98
- TFF Second League: 1984–95, 1998–06, 2015–16, 2018-
- TFF Third League: 2006–15, 2016–18
- Turkish Regional Amateur League: 1983–84

== Honours ==
- Turkish Football Championship

Winners (1): 1947

- National Division

Runners-up (1): 1939

- Prime Minister's Cup

Runners-up (1): 1947

- Ankara Football League

Winners (5): 1938–39, 1942–43, 1946–47, 1947–48, 1958–59
Runners-up (3): 1948–49, 1956–57, 1957–58

== Current squad ==
As of 8 December 2025

Note: Flags indicate national team as defined under FIFA eligibility rules; some limited exceptions apply. Players may hold more than one non-FIFA nationality.

No.	Pos.	Nation	Player
3	DF	TUR	Eren Tokat
4	DF	TUR	Murat Karadeniz
5	MF	TUR	Furkan Işıkdemir
6	MF	TUR	Eralp Aydın
7	FW	TUR	Berk Karadağ
8	MF	TUR	İsa Halidi (on loan from Galatasaray)
9	FW	TUR	Mert Aktaş (on loan from Çorum)
10	FW	TUR	Ömer Talha Nergiz
11	FW	TUR	Hasan Ege Akdoğan (on loan from Çorum)
14	DF	TUR	Eren Paşahan
16	DF	TUR	Gökhan Kurumuş
17	DF	TUR	Batuhan Süer
18	DF	TUR	Kadir Subaşı (on loan from Galatasaray)
19	FW	TUR	Deniz Yaşar

No.	Pos.	Nation	Player
22	DF	TUR	Hurşit Taşcı
29	FW	TUR	Tolunay Artuç (on loan from Boluspor)
35	GK	TUR	Hüseyin Koç
44	MF	GER	Leon Çalışkan (on loan from Iğdır)
53	DF	TUR	Taha Atay (on loan from Gençlerbirliği)
55	DF	TUR	Ali Tarkan (on loan from Samsunspor)
66	MF	TUR	Orkun Ustaoğlu
70	MF	AUT	Ibrahim Bingöl
77	DF	TUR	Hakan Vapurluoğlu
79	MF	TUR	Atakan Dama (on loan from Karacabey Belediyespor)
82	GK	TUR	Ali Taha Demir (on loan from Bulvarspor)
99	GK	TUR	Süleyman Yılmaz
—	DF	TUR	Mehmet Aslanboğa
