= 1943–44 Istanbul Football League =

Istanbul Football League
- Season: 1943–44
- Champions: Fenerbahçe SK (10th title)

The 1943–44 İstanbul Football League season was the 36th season of the league. Fenerbahçe SK won the league for the 10th time.

== Season ==
Pos	Team	Pld	W	D	L	GF	GA	GD	Pts
1	Fenerbahçe SK	18	16	1	1	77	5	+72	33
2	Beşiktaş JK	18	14	3	1	87	16	+71	31
3	Galatasaray SK	18	13	0	5	50	22	+28	26
4	Vefa SK	18	8	5	5	33	24	+9	21
5	İstanbulspor	18	7	3	8	34	55	−21	17
6	Beykoz 1908 S.K.D.	18	6	4	8	28	37	−9	16
7	Kasımpaşa SK	18	7	2	9	32	61	−29	16
8	Küçükçekmece SK	18	3	3	12	29	66	−37	9
9	Anadolu Hisarı İdman Yurdu SK	18	2	4	12	24	52	−28	8
10	Davutpaşa SK	18	0	3	15	21	77	−56	3
