= Melih Kotanca =

Turkish footballer and athlete (1915–1986)

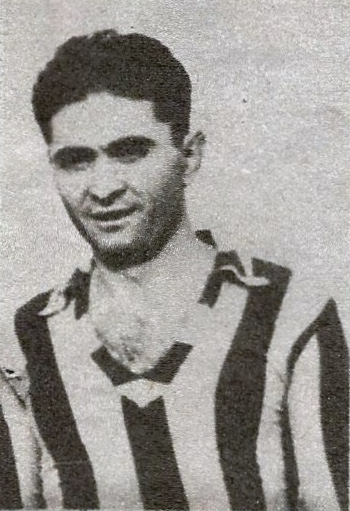

Personal information
- Date of birth: 1915
- Place of birth: Balıkesir, Turkey
- Date of death: 1986 (aged 70–71)
- Position: Forward

Senior career*
Years	Team	Apps	(Gls)
1935–1938	Güneş		
1938–1948	Fenerbahçe	185	(205)
- * Club domestic league appearances and goals

Melih Kotanca (1915–1986) was a Turkish footballer and track and field athlete.

He was twice winner at the Balkan Athletics Championships, taking the 200 metres title in 1939 and the 400 metres title in 1940.
