= Prime Minister's Cup (Turkey) =

Başbakanlık Kupası
- Organiser(s): Turkish Football Federation
- Founded: 1944
- Abolished: 1998
- Region: Turkey
- Teams: 2
- Last champions: Fenerbahçe (8th title)
- Most championships: Fenerbahçe (8 titles)

The Prime Minister's Cup (Turkish: Başbakanlık Kupası) was a football competition organised by the Turkish Football Federation in Turkey. It began in 1944 and continued until 1950 as a unique kind of super cup competition between the winners of the Turkish Football Championship and the Turkish National Division. It was one of the earliest super cups in the world. In 1966, the Turkish Football Federation restarted the competition as a final game between the winners of the second division and the Turkish Amateur Championship and maintained this system until 1970. From 1971 to 1998 the competition was contested between the runners-up of the Super League and the Turkish Cup.

Fenerbahçe are the most successful club, having won the cup eight times.

== Winners ==
=== 1944–1950 ===
Held as a super cup competition between the winners of the Turkish Football Championship and Turkish National Division.

Year	Winners	Score	Runners-up	Venue
1944	Beşiktaş	4–1	Fenerbahçe	Ankara 19 Mayıs Stadium
1945	Fenerbahçe	3–2	Harp Okulu	Ankara 19 Mayıs Stadium
1946	Fenerbahçe	4–0	Gençlerbirliği	Ankara 19 Mayıs Stadium
1947	Beşiktaş	4–0	Ankara Demirspor	Ankara 19 Mayıs Stadium
1948	not held			
1949	not held			
1950	Fenerbahçe	2–1 (aet)	Göztepe	Ankara 19 Mayıs Stadium

=== 1966–1970 ===
Contested between the winners of the Second League and Turkish Amateur Championship.

Year	Winners	Score	Runners-up	Venue
1966	Eskişehirspor	1–0	Trabzon İdman Ocağı	Ankara 19 Mayıs Stadium
1967	Mersin İdman Yurdu	2–0	İzmir Denizgücü	Ankara 19 Mayıs Stadium
1968	İzmir Denizgücü	2–0 (aet)	İzmirspor	Ankara 19 Mayıs Stadium
1969	Ankaragücü	3–0 (wo)	Sebat Gençlik	Ankara 19 Mayıs Stadium
1970	Boluspor	8–1	Muhafızgücü	Ankara 19 Mayıs Stadium

=== 1971–1998 ===
Contested between the runners-up of the Turkish Super League and Turkish Cup.

Year	Winners	Score	Runners-up	Venue
1971	Bursaspor	1–0 (aet)	Fenerbahçe	Ankara 19 Mayıs Stadium
1972	Eskişehirspor	2–0	Altay	Ankara 19 Mayıs Stadium
1973	Fenerbahçe	5–2 (aet)	Ankaragücü	Ankara 19 Mayıs Stadium
1974	Beşiktaş	3–2 (aet)	Bursaspor	Ankara 19 Mayıs Stadium
1975	Galatasaray	1–0	Trabzonspor	Cebeci İnönü Stadium
1976	Trabzonspor	2–2 (6–5 p)	Fenerbahçe	Ankara 19 Mayıs Stadium
1977	Beşiktaş	2–1	Fenerbahçe	Ankara 19 Mayıs Stadium
1978	Trabzonspor	2–1	Adana Demirspor	Ankara 19 Mayıs Stadium
1979	Galatasaray	1–0	Altay	Ankara 19 Mayıs Stadium
1980	Fenerbahçe	1–0 (aet)	Galatasaray	Ankara 19 Mayıs Stadium
1981	Boluspor	3–1	Adanaspor	Ankara 19 Mayıs Stadium
1982	not held			
1983	not held			
1984	not held			
1985	Trabzonspor	7–2	Kayserispor	Ankara 19 Mayıs Stadium
1986	Galatasaray	8–1	Altay	Ankara 19 Mayıs Stadium
1987	Eskişehirspor	2–2 (4–2 p)	Beşiktaş	Ankara 19 Mayıs Stadium
1988	Beşiktaş	3–2	Samsunspor	Ankara 19 Mayıs Stadium
1989	Fenerbahçe	3–2	Galatasaray	Ankara 19 Mayıs Stadium
1990	Galatasaray	1–0	Trabzonspor	Ankara 19 Mayıs Stadium
1991	Ankaragücü	3–1	Trabzonspor	Ankara 19 Mayıs Stadium
1992	Bursaspor	3–1	Fenerbahçe	Ankara 19 Mayıs Stadium
1993	Fenerbahçe	1–0 (aet)	Trabzonspor	Ankara 19 Mayıs Stadium
1994	Trabzonspor	4–3	Fenerbahçe	Ankara 19 Mayıs Stadium
1995	Galatasaray	1–1 (3–2 p)	Fenerbahçe	Ankara 19 Mayıs Stadium
1996	Trabzonspor	4–0	Beşiktaş	Ankara 19 Mayıs Stadium
1997	Beşiktaş	4–3 (aet)	Trabzonspor	Ankara 19 Mayıs Stadium
1998	Fenerbahçe	1–0 (aet)	Trabzonspor	Ankara 19 Mayıs Stadium

== Performance by club ==
Club	Winners	Runners-up	Years won
Fenerbahçe	8	7	1945, 1946, 1950, 1973, 1980, 1989, 1993, 1998
Beşiktaş	6	2	1944, 1947, 1974, 1977, 1988, 1997
Trabzonspor	5	6	1976, 1978, 1985, 1994, 1996
Galatasaray	5	2	1975, 1979, 1986, 1990, 1995
Eskişehirspor	3	-	1966, 1972, 1987
Ankaragücü	2	1	1969, 1991
Bursaspor	2	1	1971, 1992
Boluspor	2	-	1970, 1981
İzmir Denizgücü	1	1	1968
Mersin İdmanyurdu	1	-	1967

== See also ==
- Atatürk Cup
- Turkish Cup
- Turkish Super Cup
