= Altınordu F.K. =

Association football club

Altınordu
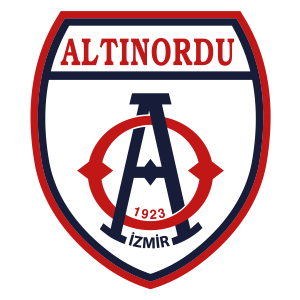
- Full name: Altınordu Futbol Kulübü
- Founded: 1923; 103 years ago
- Ground: Bornova Aziz Kocaoğlu Stadium
- Capacity: 9,138
- Chairman: Seyit Mehmet Özkan
- Manager: Yusuf Şimşek
- League: TFF 2. Lig
- 2025–26: TFF 2. Lig, White, 14th of 19
- Website: www.altinordu.org.tr
Home colours	Away colours	Third colours

Altınordu Futbol Kulübü (formerly known as Altınordu Spor Kulübü) is a Turkish professional football club based in İzmir. It was founded in 1923 as a breakaway from Altay SK. Team colours are red and navy. The club also had a basketball team and played in Turkish Basketball League and Turkish Basketball Championship. They have two Turkish basketball titles: Turkish Basketball Championship in 1967 and Basketball Super League in 1966–67 season. Currently the club focuses on development of local youth talent, exclusively fielding Turkish football players as principle.

== History ==
Another club founded out of Altay SK is Göztepe S.K. in 1925. Altınordu merged with Altay SK and Bucaspor between 1937 and 1939 and renamed as Üçokspor. Altınordu played in the First League between 1959 and 1965 and between 1966 and 1970. The team declined slowly after 1968 and relegated to the third league in 1978. It returned to the second league the next year and remained 13 seasons in it. It declined again since 1991 and lost her professional status in 1995–96 season.

It regained one league after matches of Amateur Football Championship in Trabzon in 2003. The team's performance improved season by season and it missed directly promotion by goal difference only against Konya Şekerspor in the third group of the third league in 2007–08 season. It participated in extra play-off matches in Trabzon and was promoted to the second league (which is the third tier of the Turkish League) after beating both Bingöl Belediyespor and Keçiörengücü by 1–0. However, the spell in the second league was not successful and the team was again relegated to the third league after drawing with Fethiyespor 2–2 at an away match on 9 May.

== League participations ==
- Turkish Super League: 1959–65, 1966–70
- TFF First League: 1965–66, 1970–78, 1979–92, 2014–2023
- TFF Second League: 1978–79, 1992–96, 2008–09, 2011–12, 2013–14, 2023–
- TFF Third League: 2003–08, 2009–11, 2012–2013
- Amateur League: 1925–59, 1996–03

== Honours ==
=== Football ===
- TFF 2. Lig
  - Play-off Runners-up (1) 2020–21
- Turkish Football Championship
  - Runners-up (3): 1927, 1932, 1935

=== Basketball ===
- Turkish Basketball Championship
  - Winners (1): 1967
- Basketball Super League
  - Winners (1): 1966–67
- Turkish Basketball Cup
  - Winners (1): 1967–68
