= İzmir Football League =

- Founded: 1924
- Folded: 1959
- Country: Turkey
- Number of clubs: various
- Level on pyramid: 1
- Domestic cup(s): İzmir Football Cup; İzmir Shield
- Last champions: Karşıyaka (3rd title) (1958–59)
- Most championships: Altay (14 titles)

The İzmir Football League (Turkish: İzmir Futbol Ligi) was founded as a regional football league for İzmir based clubs in 1924. In the period from 1924 to 1935, the winners of the İzmir League qualified for the former Turkish Football Championship. In 1937 the first national league in Turkish football was introduced. The top two placed teams of the İzmir League qualified for the National Division, which took place after the conclusion of the regional leagues each season. The name of the league was changed later and became İzmir Professional Football League in the 1955–56 season, when professional football was introduced.

The league continued to be played after 1959, though it was no longer a first level competition since the professional nationwide league was introduced in 1959. Altay are the most successful club in league history, having won a record 14 championship titles.

== Participated teams ==
The following teams participated in the league regularly for at least a few years:

- Altay
- Karşıyaka
- Altınordu
- İzmirspor (founded by Sakarya and Altın Ay)
- Göztepe
- İzmir Demirspor
- Kayagücü
- Menemen İdman Ocağı (later to become Menemenspor)
- Bayraklı
- Egespor (formerly Şarkspor)
- Bucaspor
- Bornova
- Yün Pamuk Mensucat
- Kültürspor
- Ülküspor
- Üçokspor (temporary merger between Altay, Altınordu, and Bucaspor)
- Doğanspor (temporary merger between Göztepe, İzmirspor, and Egespor)

== Champions ==
Season	Champions
1923–24	Altay
1924–25	Altay
1925–26	Karşıyaka
1926–27	Altınordu
1927–28	Altay
1928–29	Altay
1929–30	Sakarya
1930–31	Altay
1931–32	Altınordu
1932–33	İzmirspor
1933–34	Altay
1934–35	Altınordu
1935–36	Altınordu
1936–37	Altay
1937–38	Üçok^{1}
1938–39	Doğanspor^{2}
1939–40	Altınordu
1940–41	Altay
1941–42	Göztepe
1942–43	Göztepe
1943–44	Göztepe
1944–45	Altınordu
1945–46	Altay
1946–47	Kayagücü
1947–48	Altay
1948–49	İzmirspor
1949–50	Göztepe
1950–51	Altay
1951–52	Karşıyaka
1952–53	Göztepe
1953–54	Altay
1954–55	İzmirspor
1955–56	İzmirspor
1956–57	Altay
1957–58	Altay
1958–59	Karşıyaka

^{1} Alliance between Altay, Altınordu, and Yüce.
^{2} Alliance between Göztepe, İzmirspor, and Egespor.

== Performance by club ==
Club	Titles
Altay	14
Altınordu	6
Göztepe	5
İzmirspor^{1}	5
Karşıyaka	3
Doğanspor	1
Kayagücü	1
Üçok	1

- ^{1} Includes Sakarya
