= Ankara Football League =

- Founded: 1922
- Folded: 1959
- Country: Turkey
- Number of clubs: various
- Level on pyramid: 1
- Domestic cup(s): Ankara Shield; Ankara Football Cup
- Last champions: Ankara Demirspor (5th title) (1958–59)
- Most championships: Gençlerbirliği (10 titles)

The Ankara Football League (Turkish: Ankara Futbol Ligi) was founded as a regional football league for Ankara based clubs in 1922. In the period from 1924 to 1935, the winners of the Ankara League qualified for the former Turkish Football Championship. In 1937 the first national league in Turkish football was introduced. The top two placed teams of the Ankara League qualified for the National Division, which took place after the conclusion of the regional leagues each season. After the introduction of professionalism the name of the league became Ankara Professional Football League in the 1955–56 season.

Following the introduction of the professional nationwide league in 1959, the league lost its first level status. Gençlerbirliği hold the record with ten championship titles.

== Participated teams ==
The following teams participated in the league regularly for at least a few years:

- Gençlerbirliği
- Ankara Demirspor
- Ankaragücü (formerly Anadolu Turan San'atkârangücü and İmalât-ı Harbiye)
- Muhafızgücü
- Harp Okulu (formerly Harbiye İdman Yurdu)
- Ankara İdman Yurdu
- Çankaya
- Hacettepe
- Kırıkkalegücü
- Kırıkkale Birlikspor
- Maskespor
- Uçaksavar
- Güneşspor
- Ankara Galatasaray
- Havagücü
- Hilâl
- Yolspor
- Maltepe
- Güvençspor

== Champions ==
Season	Champions
1923	Talimgâh
1923–24	Turan San'atkârangücü
1924–25	Muhafızgücü
1925–26	Muhafızgücü
1926–27	Muhafızgücü
1927–28	Muhafızgücü
1928–29	Muhafızgücü
1929–30	Gençlerbirliği
1930–31	Gençlerbirliği
1931–32	Gençlerbirliği
1932–33	Gençlerbirliği
1933–34	Çankaya
1934–35	Gençlerbirliği
1935–36	Ankaragücü
1936–37	Ankaragücü
1937–38	Harp Okulu
1938–39	Ankara Demirspor
1939–40	Gençlerbirliği
1940–41	Gençlerbirliği
1941–42	Harp Okulu
1942–43	Ankara Demirspor
1943–44	Harp Okulu
1944–45	Harp Okulu
1945–46	Gençlerbirliği
1946–47	Ankara Demirspor
1947–48	Ankara Demirspor
1948–49	Ankaragücü
1949–50	Gençlerbirliği
1950–51	Gençlerbirliği
1951–52	Ankaragücü
1952–53	Havagücü
1953–54	Hacettepe
1954–55	none^{1}
1955–56	Hacettepe
1956–57	Ankaragücü
1957–58	Hacettepe
1958–59	Ankara Demirspor

- ^{1} Due to a conflict among civilian and military clubs, there were two leagues played in the 1954–55 season, one for civilian and one for military clubs. Hacettepe and Karagücü won their respective groups. The official Ankara champions would have been decided in a championship play-off. However, the civilian side refused to play the championship final and there was no official champion declared.

== Performance by club ==
Club	Champions
Gençlerbirliği	10
Ankaragücü	6
Ankara Demirspor	5
Muhafızgücü	5
Harp Okulu	4
Hacettepe	3
Çankaya	1
Havagücü	1
Talimgâh	1
