= List of Galatasaray S.K. seasons =

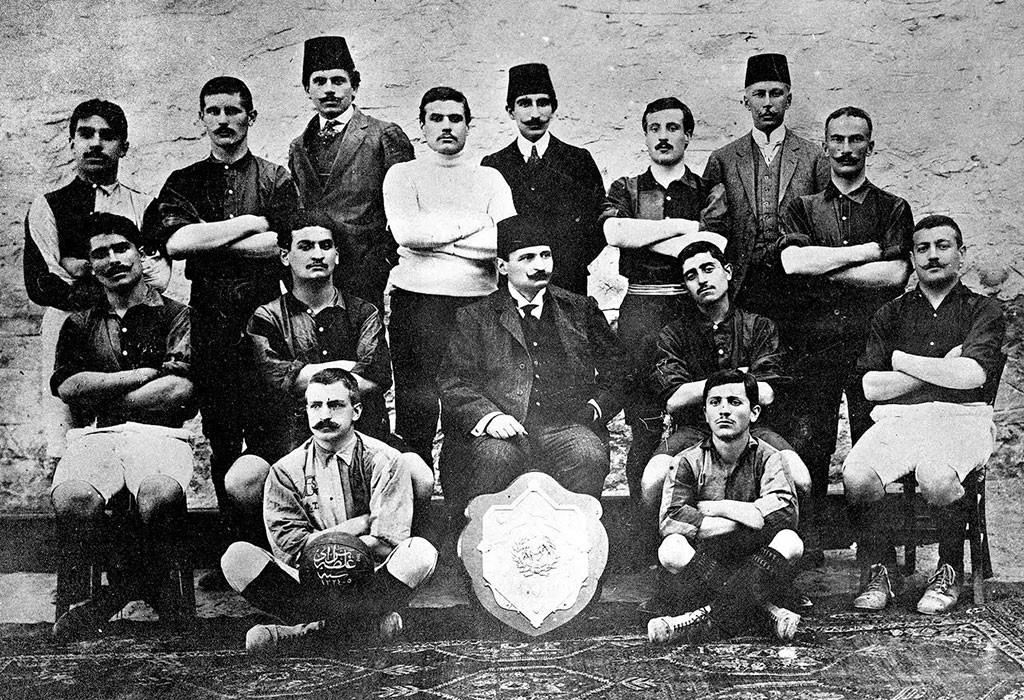
Galatasaray S.K. members after winning the Istanbul Football League of the 1908–09 season

Galatasaray Spor Kulübü is a professional football club based in Istanbul, that competes in Süper Lig, the most senior football league in Turkey. The club was formed in 1905 as Galata-Serai Football Club and played its first friendly match on 10 November 1905. Galatasaray won its first ever match, when they beat Faure Mektebi 2–0. Galatasaray played its first competitive match on 25 November 1906, when it drew 1–1 in the first week of the 1906–07 Istanbul Football League against HMS Imogene FC. Initially Galatasaray played against other local clubs in various Istanbul tournaments, but in 1959 the club became one of the founding members of Süper Lig, Turkey's first national league. Galatasaray is one of the founding members of the Turkish Süper Lig in 1959 and is one of only three clubs never to have been relegated from the top level of Turkish football, the others being the archrival Fenerbahçe and Beşiktaş.

Galatasaray's most successful spell was in the 1999–2000 season, where they won not only the Süper Lig and Turkish Cup, but also the UEFA Cup by defeating English club Arsenal in the final of the latter.

The club has won the Süper Lig championship a record 26 times, the Turkish Cup a record 19 times, the Turkish Super Cup a record 17 times, the UEFA Europa League one time and the UEFA Super Cup one time. The table details the club's achievements in the early regional championships and in all national and international first-team competitions for each completed season since the club's formation in 1905.

== Key ==
Key to league:

- Pos = Final position
- Pld = Matches played
- W = Matches won
- D = Matches drawn
- L = Matches lost
- GF = Goals scored
- GA = Goals against
- Pts = Points

Key to divisions and rounds:

- C = Champions
- F = Final (Runners-up)
- SF = Semi-finals
- QF = Quarter-finals
- R16/R32 = Round of 16, round of 32, etc.
- KPO = Knockout phase play-offs
- GS = Group stage
- POR = Play-off round
- 3QR = 3rd qualifying round
- 5R = 5th round

Champions	Runners-up

== List of seasons ==
Results of league and cup competitions by season
Season	League									Domestic Cup		Europe		Other		Top goalscorer(s)	
Season	Division	Pos.	Pld	W	D	L	GF	GA	Pts	Competition	Result	Competition	Result	Competition	Result	Player(s)	Goals
1904–05	Galatasaray did not play competitive football																
1905–06	Galatasaray did not play competitive football																
1906–07	Istanbul Lig	4th	4	0	2	2	2	10	2	—	—	—	—	—	—	n/a	n/a
1907–08	Istanbul Lig	3rd	n/a	n/a	n/a	n/a	n/a	n/a	n/a	—	—	—	—	—	—	n/a	n/a
1908–09	Istanbul Lig	1st	3	3	0	0	17	0	6	—	—	—	—	—	—	n/a	n/a
1909–10	Istanbul Lig	1st	7	7	0	0	24	2	14	—	—	—	—	—	—	n/a	n/a
1910–11	Istanbul Lig	1st	8	8	0	0	29	2	16	—	—	—	—	—	—	Celal İbrahim	4
1911–12	Galatasaray SK did not play competitive football																
1912–13	cancelled due to the Balkan Wars																
1913–14	Istanbul Lig	4th	10	3	4	3	14	12	10	—	—	—	—	—	—	n/a	n/a
1914–15	Istanbul Lig	1st	7	5	0	2	36	11	10	—	—	—	—	—	—	n/a	n/a
1915–16	Istanbul Lig	1st	10	7	2	1	31	12	25	—	—	—	—	—	—	n/a	n/a
1916–17	Istanbul Lig	3rd	9	3	0	6	16	26	18	—	—	—	—	—	—	n/a	n/a
1917–18	Istanbul Lig	6th	10	3	0	7	10	15	11	—	—	—	—	—	—	n/a	n/a
1918–19	Istanbul Lig	3rd	4	1	0	3	10	14	6	—	—	—	—	—	—	n/a	n/a
1919–20	Istanbul Lig was aborted.																
1920–21	Istanbul Lig	2nd	8	4	1	3	20	18	17	—	—	—	—	—	—	n/a	n/a
1921–22	Istanbul Lig	1st	10	9	0	1	44	10	18	—	—	—	—	—	—	n/a	n/a
1922–23	Istanbul Lig	3rd	10	4	1	5	12	16	9	—	—	—	—	—	—	n/a	n/a
1923–24	Istanbul Lig	2nd	11	8	0	3	39	16	16	—	—	—	—	—	—	n/a	n/a
1924–25	Istanbul Lig	1st	6	6	0	0	28	2	12	—	—	—	—	—	—	n/a	n/a
1925–26	Istanbul Lig	1st	5	5	0	0	34	4	10	—	—	—	—	—	—	Mehmet Leblebi	16
1926–27	Istanbul Lig	1st	7	6	1	0	26	6	20	—	—	—	—	—	—	Mehmet Leblebi	6
1927–28	Istanbul Lig was aborted due to The Olympics was held in Amsterdam.																
1928–29	Istanbul Lig	1st	10	8	2	0	29	11	28	—	—	—	—	—	—	Kemal Faruki	8
1929–30	Istanbul Lig	2nd	10	6	3	1	30	11	25	İstanbul Şildi	SF	—	—	—	—	Necdet Cici	8
1930–31	Istanbul Lig	1st	14	10	3	1	49	12	37	İstanbul Şildi	Final canceled	—	—	—	—	Kemal Faruki	13
1931–32	Galatasaray SK did not play competitive football																
1932–33	Istanbul Lig	5th	12	3	2	7	18	27	20	İstanbul Şildi	C	—	—	—	—	Mehmet Leblebi	7
1933–34	Istanbul Lig	3rd	12	6	3	3	21	14	27	İstanbul Şildi	SF	—	—	—	—	Fazıl Özkaptan	4
1934–35	Istanbul Lig	2nd	14	9	2	3	35	10	21	İstanbul Şildi	QF	—	—	—	—	Danyal Vuran	7
1935–36	Istanbul Lig	2nd	21	17	1	3	77	25	56	—	—	—	—	—	—	Gündüz Kılıç	16
1936–37	Istanbul Lig	3rd	11	8	1	2	43	10	28	—	—	—	—	—	—	Haşim Birkan Bülent Ediz	14
1936–37	Milli Küme	2nd	14	8	4	2	39	24	34	—	—	—	—	—	—	Haşim Birkan Bülent Ediz	14
1937–38	Istanbul Lig	4th	9	5	2	2	36	20	21	İstanbul Şildi	did not participate after 2 matches	—	—	—	—	Haşim Birkan	17
1937–38	Milli Küme	3rd	14	8	0	6	28	29	30	İstanbul Şildi	did not participate after 2 matches	—	—	—	—	Haşim Birkan	17
1938–39	Istanbul Lig	3rd	18	11	5	2	52	20	45	İstanbul Şildi	did not participate	—	—	—	—	Cemil Gürgen Erlertürk	17
1938–39	Milli Küme	1st	14	11	0	3	43	19	35	İstanbul Şildi	did not participate	—	—	—	—	Cemil Gürgen Erlertürk	17
1939–40	Istanbul Lig	3rd	18	13	2	3	78	11	46	—	—	—	—	—	—	Cemil Gürgen Erlertürk	33
1939–40	Milli Küme	2nd	14	9	2	3	45	19	34	—	—	—	—	—	—	Cemil Gürgen Erlertürk	33
1940–41	Istanbul Lig	3rd	18	10	4	4	59	23	42	—	—	—	—	—	—	Selahattin Almay	30
1940–41	Milli Küme	2nd	18	12	4	2	45	20	46	—	—	—	—	—	—	Selahattin Almay	30
1941–42	Istanbul Lig	2nd	18	16	0	2	71	11	50	Istanbul Kupası	C	—	—	—	—	Mustafa Gençsoy	20
1942–43	Istanbul Lig	3rd	18	12	2	4	60	19	26	Istanbul Kupası	C	—	—	—	—	Cemil Gürgen Erlertürk	23
1942–43	Milli Küme	2nd	14	11	1	2	32	7	23	Istanbul Kupası	C	—	—	—	—	Cemil Gürgen Erlertürk	23
1943–44	Istanbul Lig	3rd	18	13	0	5	50	22	26	Istanbul Kupası	SF	—	—	—	—	Bülent Eken	13
1944–45	Istanbul Lig	3rd	18	12	4	2	57	21	28	Istanbul Kupası	SF	—	—	—	—	Bülent Eken Reha Eken	22
1944–45	Milli Küme	3rd	14	7	4	3	33	13	32	Istanbul Kupası	SF	—	—	—	—	Bülent Eken Reha Eken	22
1945–46	Istanbul Lig	4th	14	4	6	4	18	15	28	Istanbul Kupası	SF	—	—	—	—	Bülent Eken	6
1946–47	Istanbul Lig	4th	14	5	6	3	23	22	30	Istanbul Kupası	SF	—	—	—	—	Bülent Eken	19
1946–47	Milli Küme	3rd	14	6	5	3	32	20	31	Istanbul Kupası	SF	—	—	—	—	Bülent Eken	19
1947–48	Istanbul Lig	3rd	14	8	2	4	30	19	32	—	—	—	—	—	—	Gündüz Kılıç	5
1948–49	Istanbul Lig	1st	14	12	1	1	39	11	39	—	—	—	—	—	—	Reha Eken	11
1949–50	Istanbul Lig	3rd	14	8	2	4	21	11	32	—	—	—	—	—	—	Gündüz Kılıç	11
1949–50	Milli Küme	2nd	14	7	7	0	34	10	35	—	—	—	—	—	—	Gündüz Kılıç	11
1950–51	Istanbul Lig	2nd	14	10	2	2	28	14	36	—	—	—	—	—	—	Naci Özkaya	9
1951–52	Istanbul Lig	2nd	14	6	7	1	23	9	19	—	—	—	—	—	—	Gündüz Kılıç	5
1952–53	Istanbul Lig	3rd	18	9	5	4	30	18	23	—	—	—	—	—	—	Reha Eken	9
1953–54	Istanbul Lig	2nd	18	12	3	3	49	20	27	—	—	—	—	—	—	Kadri Aytaç	11
1954–55	Istanbul Lig	1st	18	14	2	2	40	13	30	—	—	—	—	—	—	Ali Beratlıgil	14
1955–56	Istanbul Lig	1st	18	12	5	1	52	19	29	—	—	—	—	—	—	Metin Oktay	19
1956–57	Istanbul Lig	2nd	18	13	3	2	44	19	29	—	—	European Cup	R32	—	—	Metin Oktay	26
1956–57	Federasyon Kupası	2nd	12	8	2	2	26	10	18	—	—	European Cup	R32	—	—	Metin Oktay	26
1957–58	Istanbul Lig	1st	18	14	3	1	48	10	31	—	—	—	—	—	—	Metin Oktay	29
1957–58	Federasyon Kupası	2nd	11	7	1	3	29	9	15	—	—	—	—	—	—	Metin Oktay	29
1958–59	Istanbul Lig	2nd	18	13	4	1	50	9	30	—	—	—	—	—	—	Metin Oktay	33
1958–59	Süper Lig	2nd	16	8	6	2	19	11	22	—	—	—	—	—	—	Metin Oktay	33
1959–60	Süper Lig	3rd	38	24	10	4	74	23	58	—	—	—	—	—	—	Metin Oktay	33
1960–61	Süper Lig	2nd	38	27	6	5	75	19	60	—	—	—	—	—	—	Metin Oktay	36
1961–62	Süper Lig	1st	38	23	11	4	52	18	57	—	—	—	—	—	—	Bahri Altıntabak	12
1962–63	Süper Lig	1st	42	28	11	3	105	35	67	Türkiye Kupası	C	European Cup	QF	—	—	Metin Oktay	47
1963–64	Süper Lig	3rd	34	16	10	8	49	27	42	Türkiye Kupası	C	European Cup	R16	—	—	Metin Oktay	31
1964–65	Süper Lig	3rd	30	14	11	5	51	31	39	Türkiye Kupası	C	Cup Winners' Cup	R16	—	—	Metin Oktay	23
1965–66	Süper Lig	2nd	30	17	8	5	53	20	42	Türkiye Kupası	C	Cup Winners' Cup	R32	—	—	Metin Oktay	20
1966–67	Süper Lig	3rd	32	12	17	3	53	33	41	Türkiye Kupası	QF	Cup Winners' Cup	R32	Süper Kupa	C	Ayhan Elmastaşoğlu	16
1967–68	Süper Lig	3rd	32	13	10	9	44	36	36	Türkiye Kupası	SF	—	—	—	—	Metin Oktay	21
1968–69	Süper Lig	1st	30	19	8	3	49	14	46	Türkiye Kupası	F	—	—	Süper Kupa	C	Metin Oktay	21
1969–70	Süper Lig	8th	30	10	10	10	27	21	30	Türkiye Kupası	QF	European Cup	QF	—	—	Gökmen Özdenak	11
1970–71	Süper Lig	1st	30	17	8	5	51	18	42	Türkiye Kupası	QF	—	—	Süper Kupa	F	Gökmen Özdenak	14
1971–72	Süper Lig	1st	30	17	8	5	34	14	42	Türkiye Kupası	QF	European Cup	R32	Süper Kupa	C	Gökmen Özdenak	12
1972–73	Süper Lig	1st	30	19	9	2	47	12	47	Türkiye Kupası	C	European Cup	R32	Süper Kupa	F	Mehmet Özgül Metin Kurt	14
1973–74	Süper Lig	5th	30	13	9	8	29	16	35	Türkiye Kupası	SF	European Cup	R32	—	—	Mustafa Ergücü Mehmet Özgül	6
1974–75	Süper Lig	2nd	30	16	6	8	36	24	38	Türkiye Kupası	QF	—	—	Başbakanlık Kupası	C	Mehmet Özgül	12
1975–76	Süper Lig	3rd	30	12	13	5	36	23	37	Türkiye Kupası	C	UEFA Cup	R32	Süper Kupa	F	Şevki Şenlen	22
1976–77	Süper Lig	5th	30	10	13	7	36	26	33	Türkiye Kupası	QF	Cup Winners' Cup	R16	—	—	Gökmen Özdenak	17
1977–78	Süper Lig	3rd	30	13	12	5	38	26	38	Türkiye Kupası	QF	—	—	—	—	Gökmen Özdenak	19
1978–79	Süper Lig	2nd	30	17	7	6	47	17	41	Türkiye Kupası	R32	UEFA Cup	R64	Başbakanlık Kupası	C	Ešref Jašarević Gökmen Özdenak	9
1979–80	Süper Lig	9th	30	8	13	9	28	26	29	Türkiye Kupası	F	UEFA Cup	R64	Başbakanlık Kupası	F	Gökmen Özdenak	8
1980–81	Süper Lig	3rd	30	13	8	9	28	25	34	Türkiye Kupası	QF	—	—	—	—	Turgay İnal	6
1981–82	Süper Lig	11th	32	10	12	10	26	26	32	Türkiye Kupası	C	—	—	Süper Kupa	C	Ayhan Akbin Tarik Hodžić	8
1982–83	Süper Lig	3rd	34	17	10	7	50	33	44	Türkiye Kupası	R16	Cup Winners' Cup	R16	—	—	Mirsad Sejdić	15
1983–84	Süper Lig	3rd	34	17	10	7	54	29	44	Türkiye Kupası	QF	—	—	—	—	Tarik Hodžić	17
1984–85	Süper Lig	5th	34	11	14	9	34	28	36	Türkiye Kupası	C	—	—	Süper Kupa	F	Rüdiger Abramczik Erdal Keser	10
1985–86	Süper Lig	2nd	36	20	16	0	57	20	56	Türkiye Kupası	SF	Cup Winners' Cup	R16	Başbakanlık Kupası	C	Erdal Keser	17
1986–87	Süper Lig	1st	36	23	8	5	55	24	54	Türkiye Kupası	QF	UEFA Cup	R64	Süper Kupa	C	Uğur Tütüneker	14
1987–88	Süper Lig	1st	38	27	9	2	86	35	90	Türkiye Kupası	R16	European Cup	R32	Süper Kupa	C	Tanju Çolak	46
1988–89	Süper Lig	3rd	36	20	9	7	76	31	69	Türkiye Kupası	QF	European Cup	SF	Başbakanlık Kupası	F	Tanju Çolak	38
1989–90	Süper Lig	4th	34	19	6	9	59	26	63	Türkiye Kupası	R16	UEFA Cup	R64	Başbakanlık Kupası	C	Tanju Çolak	21
1990–91	Süper Lig	2nd	34	19	7	4	63	31	64	Türkiye Kupası	C	—	—	Süper Kupa	C	Tanju Çolak	33
1991–92	Süper Lig	3rd	30	19	3	8	54	35	60	Türkiye Kupası	QF	Cup Winners' Cup	QF	—	—	Roman Kosecki	20
1992–93	Süper Lig	1st	30	20	6	4	74	21	66	Türkiye Kupası	C	UEFA Cup	R16	—	—	Hakan Şükür	24
1993–94	Süper Lig	1st	30	22	4	4	67	28	70	Türkiye Kupası	F	Champions League	QF	Süper Kupa	C	Hakan Şükür	20
1993–94	Süper Lig	1st	30	22	4	4	67	28	70	Türkiye Kupası	F	Champions League	QF	Süper Kupa	F	Hakan Şükür	20
1994–95	Süper Lig	3rd	34	21	6	7	76	38	69	Türkiye Kupası	F	Champions League	GS	Başbakanlık Kupası	C	Saffet Sancaklı	29
1995–96	Süper Lig	4th	34	21	5	8	67	38	68	Türkiye Kupası	C	UEFA Cup	R128	Başbakanlık Kupası	C	Dean Saunders	21
1996–97	Süper Lig	1st	34	25	7	2	90	30	82	Türkiye Kupası	R16	Cup Winners' Cup	R16	Süper Kupa	C	Hakan Şükür	46
1996–97	Süper Lig	1st	34	25	7	2	90	30	82	Türkiye Kupası	R16	Cup Winners' Cup	R16	Süper Kupa	C	Hakan Şükür	46
1997–98	Süper Lig	1st	34	23	6	5	86	43	75	Türkiye Kupası	F	Champions League	GS	Süper Kupa	F	Hakan Şükür	34
1998–99	Süper Lig	1st	34	23	9	2	85	30	78	Türkiye Kupası	C	Champions League	GS	—	—	Hakan Şükür	26
1999–2000	Süper Lig	1st	34	24	7	3	77	23	79	Türkiye Kupası	C	Champions League	GS	—	—	Hakan Şükür	25
1999–2000	Süper Lig	1st	34	24	7	3	77	23	79	Türkiye Kupası	C	UEFA Cup	C	—	—	Hakan Şükür	25
2000–01	Süper Lig	2nd	34	23	4	7	77	35	73	Türkiye Kupası	SF	Champions League	QF	—	—	Mário Jardel	34
2000–01	Süper Lig	2nd	34	23	4	7	77	35	73	Türkiye Kupası	SF	Super Cup	C	—	—	Mário Jardel	34
2001–02	Süper Lig	1st	34	24	6	4	75	31	78	Türkiye Kupası	R32	Champions League	R16	Club World Championship	Cancelled	Arif Erdem	23
2002–03	Süper Lig	2nd	34	24	5	5	61	27	77	Türkiye Kupası	QF	Champions League	GS	—	—	Ümit Karan	19
2003–04	Süper Lig	6th	34	15	9	10	56	47	54	Türkiye Kupası	R16	Champions League	GS	—	—	Hakan Şükür	18
2003–04	Süper Lig	6th	34	15	9	10	56	47	54	Türkiye Kupası	R16	UEFA Cup	R32	—	—	Hakan Şükür	18
2004–05	Süper Lig	3rd	34	24	4	6	64	25	76	Türkiye Kupası	C	—	—	—	—	Hakan Şükür	22
2005–06	Süper Lig	1st	34	26	5	3	82	34	83	Türkiye Kupası	QF	UEFA Cup	R80	—	—	Necati Ateş	22
2006–07	Süper Lig	3rd	34	15	11	8	58	37	56	Türkiye Kupası	QF	Champions League	GS	—	—	Ümit Karan	22
2007–08	Süper Lig	1st	34	26	5	3	82	34	83	Türkiye Kupası	SF	UEFA Cup	GS	—	—	Ümit Karan	17
2008–09	Süper Lig	5th	34	18	7	9	57	39	61	Türkiye Kupası	QF	Champions League	3QR	Süper Kupa	C	Milan Baroš	26
2008–09	Süper Lig	5th	34	18	7	9	57	39	61	Türkiye Kupası	QF	UEFA Cup	R16	Süper Kupa	C	Milan Baroš	26
2009–10	Süper Lig	3rd	34	19	7	8	61	35	64	Türkiye Kupası	QF	Europa League	R32	—	—	Milan Baroš Shabani Nonda	16
2010–11	Süper Lig	8th	34	14	4	16	41	46	46	Türkiye Kupası	QF	Europa League	POR	—	—	Milan Baroš	11
2011–12	Süper Lig	1st	40	25	11	4	78	30	86	Türkiye Kupası	R16	—	—	—	—	Selçuk İnan	13
2012–13	Süper Lig	1st	34	21	8	5	66	35	71	Türkiye Kupası	5R	Champions League	QF	Süper Kupa	C	Burak Yılmaz	32
2013–14	Süper Lig	2nd	34	18	11	5	59	32	65	Türkiye Kupası	C	Champions League	R16	Süper Kupa	C	Burak Yılmaz	18
2014–15	Süper Lig	1st	34	24	5	5	60	35	77	Türkiye Kupası	C	Champions League	GS	Süper Kupa	F	Burak Yılmaz	22
2015–16	Süper Lig	6th	34	13	12	9	69	49	51	Türkiye Kupası	C	Champions League	GS	Süper Kupa	C	Lukas Podolski	17
2015–16	Süper Lig	6th	34	13	12	9	69	49	51	Türkiye Kupası	C	Europa League	R32	Süper Kupa	C	Lukas Podolski	17
2016–17	Süper Lig	4th	34	20	4	10	65	40	64	Türkiye Kupası	R16	—	—	—	—	Lukas Podolski	17
2017–18	Süper Lig	1st	34	24	3	7	75	33	75	Türkiye Kupası	SF	Europa League	2QR	—	—	Bafétimbi Gomis	32
2018–19	Süper Lig	1st	34	20	9	5	72	36	69	Türkiye Kupası	C	Champions League	GS	Süper Kupa	F	Henry Onyekuru	16
2018–19	Süper Lig	1st	34	20	9	5	72	36	69	Türkiye Kupası	C	Europa League	R32	Süper Kupa	F	Henry Onyekuru	16
2019–20	Süper Lig	6th	34	15	11	8	55	37	56	Türkiye Kupası	QF	Champions League	GS	Süper Kupa	C	Adem Büyük Radamel Falcao	11
2020–21	Süper Lig	2nd	40	26	6	8	80	36	84	Türkiye Kupası	QF	Europa League	POR	—	—	Mbaye Diagne	11
2021–22	Süper Lig	13th	38	14	10	14	51	53	52	Türkiye Kupası	5R	Champions League	2QR	—	—	Kerem Aktürkoğlu	13
2021–22	Süper Lig	13th	38	14	10	14	51	53	52	Türkiye Kupası	5R	Europa League	R16	—	—	Kerem Aktürkoğlu	13
2022–23	Süper Lig	1st	36	28	4	4	83	27	88	Türkiye Kupası	QF	—	—	—	—	Mauro Icardi	23
2023–24	Süper Lig	1st	38	33	3	2	92	26	102	Türkiye Kupası	QF	Champions League	GS	Süper Kupa	C	Mauro Icardi	32
2023–24	Süper Lig	1st	38	33	3	2	92	26	102	Türkiye Kupası	QF	Europa League	KPO	Süper Kupa	C	Mauro Icardi	32
2024–25	Süper Lig	1st	36	30	5	1	91	31	95	Türkiye Kupası	C	Champions League	POR	Süper Kupa	F	Victor Osimhen	37
2024–25	Süper Lig	1st	36	30	5	1	91	31	95	Türkiye Kupası	C	Europa League	KPO	Süper Kupa	F	Victor Osimhen	37
2025–26	Süper Lig	1st	34	24	5	5	77	30	77	Türkiye Kupası	QF	Champions League	R16	Süper Kupa	F	Victor Osimhen	22
