= 1932–33 Galatasaray S.K. season =

Galatasaray
1932–33 season
- President: Fethi İsfendiyaroğlu (until 3 February 1933); Ali Haydar Barşal
- Manager: Fred Pegnam (until End 1932); Syd Puddefoot
- Stadium: Taksim Stadı
- Istanbul Lig: 5th
- Istanbul Şildi: Winner
- Top goalscorer: League: Mehmet Leblebi (7); All: Mehmet Leblebi (7)
Home colours

The 1932–33 season was Galatasaray SK's 29th in existence and the club's 21st consecutive season in the Istanbul Football League.

== Squad statistics ==
No.	Pos.	Name	IFL		IS		Total	
No.	Pos.	Name	Apps	Goals	Apps	Goals	Apps	Goals
-	GK	(Turkey) Rasim Atala	2	0	n/a	n/a	2	0
-	GK	(Turkey) Avni Kurgan	10	0	n/a	n/a	10	0
-	DF	(Turkey) Tevfik Baha	4	0	n/a	n/a	4	0
-	DF	(Turkey) Burhan Atak	11	0	n/a	n/a	11	0
-	DF	(Turkey) Asım Bey	5	0	n/a	n/a	5	0
-	MF	(Turkey) Nihat Bekdik (C)	11	0	n/a	n/a	11	0
-	MF	(Turkey) Suphi Batur	9	0	n/a	n/a	9	0
-	MF	(Turkey) Osman Alyanak	1	0	n/a	n/a	1	0
-	MF	(Turkey) Kamuran Olcayto	1	0	n/a	n/a	1	0
-	MF	(Turkey) Hüseyin Şakir	1	0	n/a	n/a	1	0
-	MF	(Turkey) Mithat Ertuğ	2	0	n/a	n/a	2	0
-	MF	(Turkey) Suavi Atasagun	4	0	n/a	n/a	4	0
-	MF	(Turkey) Bülent Davran	4	0	n/a	n/a	4	0
-	MF	(Turkey) İbrahim Tusder	3	0	n/a	n/a	3	0
-	MF	(Turkey) Şakir Baruer	1	0	n/a	n/a	1	0
-	FW	(Turkey) Rıza Köprülü	4	0	n/a	n/a	4	0
-	FW	(Turkey) Necdet Cici	4	1	n/a	n/a	4	1
-	FW	(Turkey) Refii Erkal	2	0	n/a	n/a	2	0
-	FW	(Turkey) Celal Şefik	6	3	n/a	n/a	6	3
-	FW	(Turkey) Kemal Şefik	3	1	n/a	n/a	3	1
-	FW	(Turkey) Latif Yalınlı	1	0	n/a	n/a	1	0
-	FW	(Turkey) Muslih Peykoğlu	1	2	n/a	n/a	1	2
-	FW	(Turkey) Mehmet Leblebi	10	7	n/a	n/a	10	7
-	FW	(Turkey) Mustafa Faruk	1	0	n/a	n/a	1	0
-	FW	(Turkey) Rebii Erkal	10	1	n/a	n/a	10	1
-	FW	(Turkey) Rasih Minkari	8	2	n/a	n/a	8	2
-	FW	(Turkey) Necdet Olcay	3	0	n/a	n/a	3	0
-	FW	(Turkey) Fazıl Özkaptan	4	1	n/a	n/a	4	1
-	FW	(Turkey) Danyal Vuran	1	0	n/a	n/a	1	0
-	FW	(Turkey) Fatih Bey	1	0	n/a	n/a	1	0

== Squad changes for the 1932–33 season ==
In: Note: Flags indicate national team as defined under FIFA eligibility rules; some limited exceptions apply. Players may hold more than one non-FIFA nationality.

No.	Pos.	Nation	Player
-		TUR	Fazıl Özkaptan (from Galatasaray High School)
-		TUR	Danyal Vuran (from Galatasaray High School)
-		TUR	Rasih Minkari (from Galatasaray High School)
-		TUR	İbrahim Tusder (from İzmirspor)
-		TUR	Tevfik Baha (from İstanbulspor)
-		TUR	Bülent Davran (from Hilal SK)
-		TUR	Osman Alyanak (from Galatasaray B Team)

Out: Note: Flags indicate national team as defined under FIFA eligibility rules; some limited exceptions apply. Players may hold more than one non-FIFA nationality.

No.	Pos.	Nation	Player
-		TUR	Ulvi Yenal (to)
-		TUR	Mehmet Nazif (to)
-		TUR	Müçteba (to)
-		TUR	Kemal Faruki (to)

== Competitions ==
=== Istanbul Football League ===
==== Standings ====
Pos	Team	Pld	W	D	L	GF	GA	GD	Pts
1	Fenerbahçe SK	12	10	2	0	32	8	+24	34
2	Beşiktaş JK	12	8	2	2	24	7	+17	29 (Note: 1 point deducted?)
3	İstanbulspor	12	4	5	3	14	10	+4	25
4	Vefa SK	12	3	3	6	10	24	−14	21
5	Galatasaray SK	12	3	2	7	18	27	−9	20
6	Küçükçekmece SK	12	2	4	6	20	7	+13	17 (Note: 3 points deducted?)
7	Beykoz 1908 S.K.D.	12	1	4	7	17	29	−12	18

==== Matches ====
Kick-off listed in local time (EEST)

9 December 1932 1	Galatasaray SK	0–3	Beşiktaş JK	Istanbul
		(Report)	Hakkı 26', 66'; Şeref 24'	Stadium: Taksim Stadı; Referee: Abdullah Bey

16 December 1932 2	Küçükçekmece SK	2–1	Galatasaray SK	Istanbul
	Cafer 44', 73'	(Report)	Kemal 62'	Stadium: Taksim Stadı; Referee: Sait Selahattin Cihanoğlu

23 December 1932 3	Galatasaray SK	5–0	Vefa SK	Istanbul
	Mehmet 26', 80'; Rasih 54', 57'; Necdet 69'	(Report)		Stadium: Taksim Stadı; Referee: Hamdi Emin Çap

30 December 1932 4	Istanbulspor	3–0	Galatasaray SK	Istanbul
	Selahattin 7'; Reşat 60'; Fahri 83'	(Report)		Stadium: Fenerbahçe Stadı; Referee: Nuri Bosut

20 January 1933 5	Galatasaray SK	4–4	Beykoz 1908 S.K.D.	Istanbul
	Mehmet 3', 57', 69', 85'	(Report)	Mustafa 5'; Sait 28'; Bahadır 60'; Rıdvan 82'	Stadium: Fenerbahçe Stadı; Referee: Sait Selahattin Cihanoğlu

10 February 1933 6	Fenerbahçe SK	5–1	Galatasaray SK	Istanbul
	Zeki Rıza 12', 75'; Mehmet Reşat 16'; Muzaffer 48'; Fikret 54'p	(Report)	Mehmet 9'	Stadium: Fenerbahçe Stadı; Referee: Sami Açıköney

17 March 1933 7	Beşiktaş JK	5–0	Galatasaray SK	Istanbul
	Şeref 25', 82'; Nazım 48', 53'; Hayati 65'	(Report)		Stadium: Taksim Stadı; Referee: Sait Selahattin Cihanoğlu

24 March 1933 8	Galatasaray SK	0–1	Küçükçekmece SK	Istanbul
		(Report)	Bülent 21'	Stadium: Fenerbahçe Stadı; Referee: İzzet Muhittin Apak

14 April 1933 9	Galatasaray SK	1–0	İstanbulspor	Istanbul
	Celal 4'	(Report)		Stadium: Taksim Stadı; Referee: Sami Açıköney

12 May 1933 10	Beykoz 1908 S.K.D.	1–1	Galatasaray SK	Istanbul
	Şahap 71'	(Report)	Fazıl 36'	Stadium: Taksim Stadı; Referee: Adil Giray

2 June 1933 11	Galatasaray SK	0–2	Fenerbahçe SK	Istanbul
		(Report)	Şaban 53', 85'	Stadium: Fenerbahçe Stadı; Referee: Kemal Halim Gürgen

16 June 1933 12	Vefa SK	1–5	Galatasaray SK	Istanbul
	Muhteşem 17'	(Report)	Muslih 6', 7'; Celal 23', 34'; Rebii 55'	Stadium: Taksim Stadı; Referee: Sait Selahattin Cihanoğlu

=== İstanbul Shield ===
Kick-off listed in local time (EEST)

1933 İstanbul Shield	Galatasaray SK	3–1	Küçükçekmece SK	Istanbul
		[ (Report)]		Stadium: Fenerbahçe Stadı

1933 İstanbul Shield	Galatasaray SK	2–0	Altınordu İdman Yurdu SK	Istanbul
		[ (Report)]		Stadium: Fenerbahçe Stadı

1933 İstanbul Shield	Galatasaray SK	9–2	Üsküdar Anadolu SK	Istanbul
		[ (Report)]		Stadium: Fenerbahçe Stadı

30 June 1933 İstanbul Shield - postponed	Galatasaray SK	0–2	Fenerbahçe SK	Istanbul
		[The match was cancelled due to the abusive behavior of Fenerbahçe fans. (Report)]		Stadium: Fenerbahçe Stadı; Referee: Emin Fuat

21 September 1933 İstanbul Shield Semi Final	Galatasaray SK	1–0	Fenerbahçe SK	Istanbul
		[ (Report)]		Stadium: Fenerbahçe Stadı

1933 İstanbul Shield Final	Galatasaray SK	0–0	İstanbulspor	Istanbul
		[(Report)]		Stadium: Fenerbahçe Stadı

1933 İstanbul Shield Final	Galatasaray SK	3–0	İstanbulspor	Istanbul
		[ (Report)]		Stadium: Fenerbahçe Stadı

=== Friendly Matches ===
18 May 1932 Friendly Match	Galatasaray SK	5–0	French cruiser Jeanne d'Arc (1930) Crew	Istanbul
		[French School Ship (Report)]		Stadium: Taksim Stadium

3 June 1932 Friendly Match	Galatasaray SK	1–2	Racing Levallois 92	Istanbul
		[ (Report)]		Stadium: Taksim Stadium

11 October 1932 Friendly Match	Galatasaray SK	0–2	Levski Sofia	Istanbul
		Report		Stadium: Taksim Stadium

11 June 1933 Friendly Match	Galatasaray SK	0–0	Apollon Smyrnis	Istanbul
		[ (Report)]		Stadium: Taksim Stadium
