= 1930–31 Galatasaray S.K. season =

Galatasaray
1930–31 season
- President: (Turkey) Ahmet Kara
- Manager: (Hungary) Jules Limbeck
- Stadium: Taksim Stadı
- Istanbul Lig: 1st
- Top goalscorer: League: Kemal Faruki (13); All: Kemal Faruki (13)
Home colours

The 1930–31 season was Galatasaray SK's 27th in existence and the club's 20th consecutive season in the Istanbul Football League.

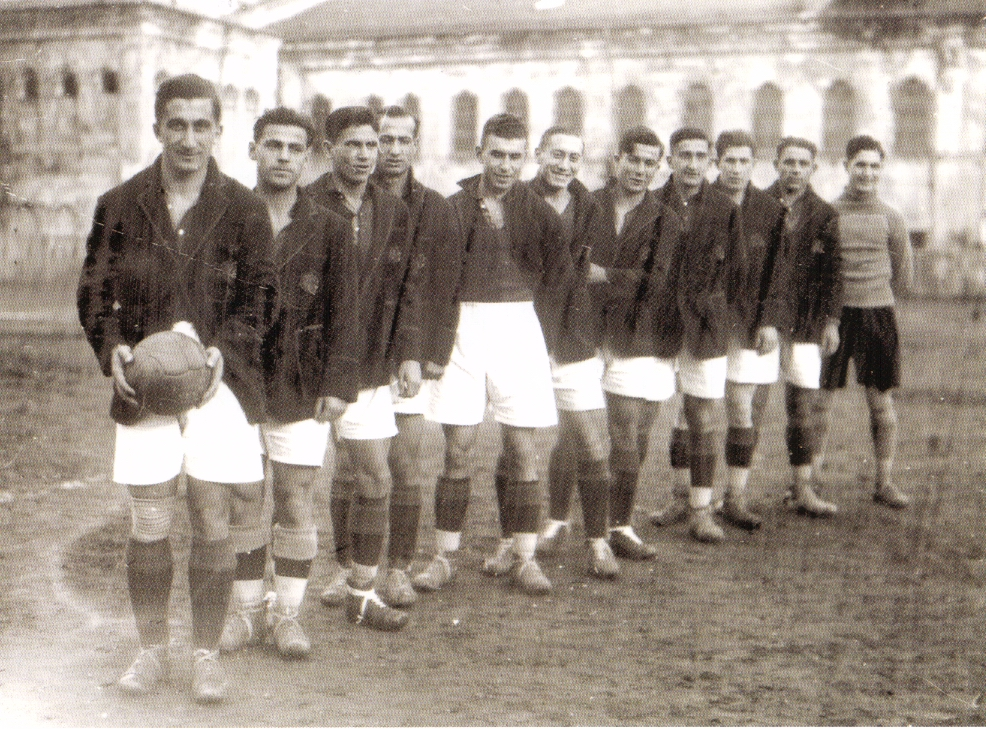
Galatasaray SK 1930-1931 Champion Team

== Squad statistics ==
No.	Pos.	Name	IFL		Total	
No.	Pos.	Name	Apps	Goals	Apps	Goals
-	GK	(Turkey) Avni Kurgan	14	0	14	0
-	GK	(Turkey) Ulvi Yenal	2	0	2	0
-	DF	(Turkey) Vahyi Oktay	14	0	14	0
-	DF	(Turkey) Burhan Atak	7	2	7	2
-	MF	(Turkey) Nihat Bekdik (C)	13	0	13	0
-	MF	(Turkey) Mithat Ertuğ	12	1	12	1
-	MF	(Turkey) Şakir Baruer	10	2	10	2
-	MF	(Turkey) Suphi Batur	6	0	6	0
-	MF	(Turkey) Hüseyin Şakir	6	0	6	0
-	MF	(Turkey) Müçteba Remzi	5	0	5	0
-	MF	(Turkey) Muammer Çakınay	1	0	1	0
-	FW	(Turkey) Mehmet Leblebi	14	7	14	7
-	FW	(Turkey) Kemal Faruki	14	13	14	13
-	FW	(Turkey) Rebii Erkal	13	4	13	4
-	FW	(Turkey) Latif Yalınlı	10	10	10	10
-	FW	(Turkey) Necdet Cici	9	7	9	7
-	FW	(Turkey) Ercüment Işıl	3	2	3	2
-	FW	(Turkey) Celal Şefik	1	1	1	1
-	FW	(Turkey) Kemal Şefik	1	1	1	1
-	FW	(Turkey) Rıfat Alper	1	1	1	1
-	FW	(Turkey) Rasih Minkari	1	1	1	1

== Competitions ==
=== Istanbul Football League ===
==== Standings ====
Pos	Team	Pld	W	D	L	GF	GA	GD	Pts
1	Galatasaray SK	14	10	3	1	49	12	+37	37
2	Fenerbahçe SK	14	10	1	3	64	12	+52	35
3	Beşiktaş JK	14	7	4	3	30	11	+19	32
4	Vefa SK	11	7	1	3	33	23	+10	26
5	İstanbulspor	14	5	4	5	21	20	+1	28
6	Beykoz 1908 S.K.D.	14	5	1	8	16	25	−9	23 (Note: 2 points deducted?)
7	Küçükçekmece SK	14	3	3	8	12	43	−31	23
8	Üsküdar Anadolu SK	14	0	1	13	9	84	−75	15

==== Results summary ====
Overall								Home						Away					
Pld	W	D	L	GF	GA	GD	Pts	W	D	L	GF	GA	GD	W	D	L	GF	GA	GD
14	10	3	1	49	12	+37	33	6	1	0	30	5	+25	4	2	1	19	7	+12

Last updated: September 6, 2011.
Source: Istanbul Futbol Lig

==== Results by round ====
Round	1	2	3	4	5	6	7	8	9	10	11	12	13	14
Ground	H	H	A	H	A	H	H	A	A	H	A	A	H	A
Result	W	D	W	W	W	W	W	W	L	W	W	D	W	D

Source: Istanbul Futbol Lig
A = Away; H = Home; W = Win; D = Draw; L = Loss

==== Matches ====
Kick-off listed in local time (EEST)

December 19, 1930	Galatasaray SK	3 – 1	Beşiktaş JK	Taksim Stadı, Istanbul
	Necdet 17'; Celal 63'; Kemal 71'	(Report)	Nazım 38'	Referee: Niyazi Taşdelen

December 26, 1930	Galatasaray SK	1 – 1	Fenerbahçe SK	Taksim Stadı, Istanbul
	Rebii 17'	(Report)	Muzaffer 61'	Referee: Niyazi Taşdelen

January 2, 1931	Vefa SK	1 – 4	Galatasaray SK	Taksim Stadı, Istanbul
	Muhteşem 9'	(Report)	Necdet 26'; Kemal 32', 74'; Latif 53'	Referee: Refik Osman Top

January 16, 1931	Galatasaray SK	9 – 0	Üsküdar Anadolu SK	Taksim Stadı, Istanbul
	Latif 1', 1', 1'; Necdet 1', 1'; Kemal 1', 1'; Mehmet 1'; Mithat Ertuğ 1'	(Report)		Referee: Arif Bey

January 21, 1931	Küçükçekmece SK	0 – 5	Galatasaray SK	Taksim Stadı, Istanbul
		(Report)	Kemal 40'p Necdet 47'; Mehmet 52', 76'; Rebii 83'	Referee: Refik Osman Top

February 6, 1931	Galatasaray SK	3 – 0	İstanbulspor	Taksim Stadı, Istanbul
	Kemal 3'; Latif 15', 21'	(Report)		Referee: Arif Bey

February 13, 1931	Galatasaray SK	6 – 1	Beykoz 1908 S.K.D.	Taksim Stadı, Istanbul
	Rebii 1'; Kemal 40', 63'; Latif 49', 82'; Mehmet 75'	(Report)	Sait 11'	Referee: Niyazi Taşdelen

March 13, 1931	Beşiktaş JK	1 – 3	Galatasaray SK	Taksim Stadı, Istanbul
	Eşref 73'	(Report)	Kemal 10'; Şakir 37'; Rebii 64'	Referee: Niyazi Taşdelen

March 20, 1931	Fenerbahçe SK	2 – 0	Galatasaray SK	Taksim Stadı, Istanbul
	Niyazi 65'; Zeki Rıza 75'	(Report)		Referee: Kemal Halim Gürgen

April 17, 1931	Galatasaray SK	4 – 1	Küçükçekmece SK	Taksim Stadı, Istanbul
	Mehmet 35'; Latif 59'; Kemal 71', 88'	(Report)	Ruşen 12'

April 24, 1931	Üsküdar Anadolu SK	0 – 4	Galatasaray SK	Taksim Stadı, Istanbul
		(Report)	Latif 20'; Kemal 44'; Latif 61'; Latif 78'

May 24, 1931	Beykoz 1908 S.K.D.	2 – 2	Galatasaray SK	Taksim Stadı, Istanbul
	Salvator 6'; Latif 75'	(Report)	Ercüment 4'; Mehmet 43'	Referee: Sait Selahattin Cihanoğlu

May 29, 1931	Galatasaray SK	4 – 1	Vefa SK	Taksim Stadı, Istanbul
	Mehmet 40'; Necdet 51', 90'; Ercüment 83'	(Report)	Muhteşem 75'	Referee: Sait Selahattin Cihanoğlu

June 5, 1931	İstanbulspor	1 – 1	Galatasaray SK	Taksim Stadı, Istanbul
	Selahattin 61'	(Report)	Burhan 76' p	Referee: Refik Osman Top

=== Friendly Matches ===
June 6, 1930	FC Juventus București (1924)	4 – 2	Galatasaray SK	Bucharest, Romania
		[(Report)]	Rebii Erkal, Nihat

1930	Beuthenorg FC	4 – 2	Galatasaray SK	Beuthen, Germany
		[(Report)]	Nihat, Şadlı

1930	Brandenburg FC	3 – 1	Galatasaray SK	Dresden, Germany
		[(Report)]	Nihat

June 14, 1930	Wiener Sport-Club	6 – 1	Galatasaray SK	Vienna, Austria
		[(Report)]	Suphi Batur

1930	Hakoah Vienna	1 – 0	Galatasaray SK	Vienna, Austria
		[(Report)]

May 10, 1930	Galatasaray SK	2 – 1	B.E.A.C.	Istanbul, Turkey
	Kemal Faruki; Rebii Erkal	[Hungarian Amateur Team(Report)]

September 19, 1930	Galatasaray SK	1 – 3	Admira Wacker	Istanbul, Turkey
	Burhan Atak (pen.)	[(Report)]

Galatasaray SK:
GK	1	(Turkey) Avni Kurgay
RB	2	(Turkey) Burhan Atak
CB	3	(Turkey) Mehmet Nazif (Vahyi Oktay)
CB	4	(Turkey) Muammer Çakınay
LB	5	(Turkey) Nihat Bekdik
RM	6	(Turkey) Mithat Ertuğ
CM	7	(Turkey) Kemal Şefik
CM	8	(Turkey) Kemal Faruki (c)
CM	9	(Turkey) Mehmet Leblebi
FW	10	(Turkey) Vedat Abut (Rasih Minkari)
FW	11	(Turkey) Rebii Erkal
Substitutes:
Manager:
(Hungary) Jules Limbeck

September 21, 1930, Sunday	Galatasaray SK	1 – 3	Wiener Sport-Club	Istanbul, Turkey
	Rasih Minkari	[(Report)]

Galatasaray SK:
GK	1	(Turkey) Avni Kurgay
RB	2	(Turkey) Burhan Atak
CB	3	(Turkey) Vahyi Oktay
CB	4	(Turkey) Suphi Batur(Niyazi)
LB	5	(Turkey) Nihat Bekdik
RM	6	(Turkey) Mithat Ertuğ
CM	7	(Turkey) Kemal Şefik
CM	8	(Turkey) Nihat (c)
CM	9	(Turkey) Mehmet Leblebi
FW	10	(Turkey) Vedat (Celal Şefik)
FW	11	(Turkey) Rebii Erkal
Substitutes:
Manager:
(Hungary) Jules Limbeck

October 26, 1930	Galatasaray SK	5 – 1	Aris	Taksim Stadium, Istanbul
		[(Report)]

Galatasaray SK:
GK	1	(Turkey) Avni Kurgay (Ömer)
RB	2	(Turkey) Burhan Atak
CB	3	(Turkey) Vahyi Oktay (Niyazi)
CB	4	(Turkey) Muammer Çakınay
LB	5	(Turkey) Nihat Bekdik
RM	6	(Turkey) Mithat Ertuğ
CM	7	(Turkey) Celal Şefik
CM	8	(Turkey) Kemal Faruki (c)(Rıfat Alper)
CM	9	(Turkey) Necdet Cici
FW	10	(Turkey) Latif Yalınlı
FW	11	(Turkey) Rebii Erkal
Substitutes:
Manager:
(Hungary) Jules Limbeck

April 10, 1931, Friday	Galatasaray SK	1 – 2	Levski Sofia	Taksim Stadium, Istanbul
	Burhan Atak(pen.)	[(Report)]

Galatasaray SK:
GK	1	(Turkey) Avni Kurgay
RB	2	(Turkey) Burhan Atak
CB	3	(Turkey) Vahyi Oktay
CB	4	(Turkey) Suphi Batur
LB	5	(Turkey) Nihat Bekdik
RM	6	(Turkey) Mithat Ertuğ
CM	7	(Turkey) Mehmet Leblebi(Celal Şefik)
CM	8	(Turkey) Kemal Faruki (Ercüment Işıl)
CM	9	(Turkey) Necdet Cici
FW	10	(Turkey) Latif Yalınlı (Kemal Faruki)
FW	11	(Turkey) Rebii Erkal
Substitutes:
Manager:
(Hungary) Jules Limbeck

April 30, 1931	Galatasaray SK	3 – 2	Beogradski SK	Taksim Stadium, Istanbul
		[(Report)]

Galatasaray SK:
GK	1	(Turkey) Avni Kurgay
RB	2	(Turkey) Burhan Atak
CB	3	(Turkey) Vahyi Oktay
CB	4	(Turkey) Suphi Batur
LB	5	(Turkey) Nihat Bekdik
RM	6	(Turkey) Mithat Ertuğ
CM	7	(Turkey) Celal Şefik(Mehmet Leblebi)
CM	8	(Turkey) Mehmet Leblebi (Kemal faruki)
CM	9	(Turkey) Ercüment Işıl
FW	10	(Turkey) Latif Yalınlı (Kemal Faruki)
FW	11	(Turkey) Rebii Erkal
Substitutes:
Manager:
(Hungary) Jules Limbeck

May 24, 1931, Sunday	Galatasaray SK	2 – 0	Olympiacos	Taksim Stadium, Istanbul
		[(Report)]

Galatasaray SK:
GK	1	(Turkey) Ulvi Yenal
RB	2	(Turkey) Burhan Atak
CB	3	(Turkey) Vahyi Oktay
CB	4	(Turkey) Suphi Batur
LB	5	(Turkey) Nihat Bekdik
RM	6	(Turkey) Mithat Ertuğ
CM	7	(Turkey) Mehmet Leblebi
CM	8	(Turkey) Kemal Faruki (c)
CM	9	(Turkey) Necdet Cici
FW	10	(Turkey) Latif Yalınlı
FW	11	(Turkey) Rebii Erkal
Substitutes:
Manager:
(Hungary) Jules Limbeck

June 12, 1931	Galatasaray SK	2 – 1	Eintracht Frankfurt	Taksim Stadium, Istanbul
		[(Report)]

Galatasaray SK:
GK	1	(Turkey) Avni Kurgal
RB	2	(Turkey) Mehmet Nazif(Asım)
CB	3	(Turkey) Vahyi Oktay
CB	4	(Turkey) Suphi Batur
LB	5	(Turkey) Nihat Bekdik
RM	6	(Turkey) Muammer Çakınay(Hüseyin Şakir)
CM	7	(Turkey) Mehmet Leblebi
CM	8	(Turkey) Ercüment Işıl (Kemal Faruki)
CM	9	(Turkey) Necdet Cici
FW	10	(Turkey) Kemal Faruki (Celal Şefik)
FW	11	(Turkey) Rebii Erkal
Substitutes:
Manager:
(Hungary) Jules Limbeck

=== İstanbul Shield Final Match ===
July 3, 1931

Galatasaray SK	? – ?	Fenerbahçe SK
	Cancelled

Taksim Stadium, Istanbul
