= 1929–30 Galatasaray S.K. season =

Galatasaray
1929–30 season
- President: (Turkey) Necmettin Sadık Sadak (until 25 October 1929) (Turkey) Abidin Daver
- Manager: (Turkey) Nihat Bekdik (until April 1930) (Hungary) Jules Limbeck
- Stadium: Taksim Stadı
- Istanbul Lig: 2nd
- Istanbul Şildi: Semi final
- Top goalscorer: League: Necdet Cici (8); All: Necdet Cici (8)
Home colours

The 1929–30 season was Galatasaray SK's 26th in existence and the club's 19th consecutive season in the Istanbul Football League.

== Squad statistics ==
No.	Pos.	Name	IFL		IS		Total	
No.	Pos.	Name	Apps	Goals	Apps	Goals	Apps	Goals
-	GK	(Turkey) Rasim Atala	5	0	n/a	n/a	5	0
-	GK	(Turkey) Avni Kurgan	5	0	n/a	n/a	5	0
-	DF	(Turkey) Vahyi Oktay	3	0	n/a	n/a	3	0
-	DF	(Turkey) Burhan Atak	9	1	n/a	n/a	9	1
-	DF	(Turkey) Asım Bey	1	0	n/a	n/a	1	0
-	MF	(Turkey) Nihat Bekdik (C)	8	2	n/a	n/a	8	2
-	MF	(Turkey) Hüseyin Şakir	1	0	n/a	n/a	1	0
-	MF	(Turkey) Suphi Batur	9	0	n/a	n/a	9	0
-	MF	(Turkey) Ziya İhsan İsban	1	0	n/a	n/a	1	0
-	MF	(Turkey) Mithat Ertuğ	8	0	n/a	n/a	8	0
-	MF	(Turkey) Muammer Çakınay	5	1	n/a	n/a	5	1
-	MF	(Turkey) İbrahim Bey	1	0	n/a	n/a	1	0
-	MF	(Turkey) Şakir Baruer	5	0	n/a	n/a	5	0
-	FW	(Turkey) Rıfat Alper	2	0	n/a	n/a	2	0
-	FW	(Turkey) Ercüment Işıl	1	0	n/a	n/a	1	0
-	FW	(Turkey) Celal Şefik	1	0	n/a	n/a	1	0
-	FW	(Turkey) Kemal Şefik	8	3	n/a	n/a	8	3
-	FW	(Turkey) Latif Yalınlı	6	4	n/a	n/a	6	4
-	FW	(Turkey) Kemal Faruki	2	1	n/a	n/a	2	1
-	FW	(Turkey) Muslih Peykoğlu	5	2	n/a	n/a	5	2
-	FW	(Turkey) Mehmet Leblebi	4	2	n/a	n/a	4	2
-	FW	(Turkey) Vedat Abut	2	1	n/a	n/a	2	1
-	FW	(Turkey) Rebii Erkal	9	4	n/a	n/a	9	4
-	FW	(Turkey) Necdet Cici	9	8	n/a	n/a	9	8

== Squad changes for the 1929–1930 season ==
In: Note: Flags indicate national team as defined under FIFA eligibility rules; some limited exceptions apply. Players may hold more than one non-FIFA nationality.

No.	Pos.	Nation	Player
-		TUR	Necdet Cici (from Galatasaray High School)
-		TUR	Celal Şefik (from Galatasaray High School)
-		TUR	Avni Kurgan (from Galatasaray High School)

== Competitions ==
=== Istanbul Football League ===
==== Standings ====
Pos	Team	Pld	W	D	L	GF	GA	GD	Pts
1	Fenerbahçe SK	10	8	2	0	39	15	+24	28
2	Galatasaray SK	10	6	3	1	30	11	+19	25
3	Beşiktaş JK	10	6	2	2	23	13	+10	24
4	Vefa SK	10	3	0	7	19	27	−8	16
5	İstanbulspor	10	3	0	7	15	37	−22	16
6	Beykoz 1908 S.K.D.	10	0	1	9	11	34	−23	11

==== Matches ====
Kick-off listed in local time (EEST)

8 November 1929 1	Beykoz 1908 S.K.D.	1–2	Galatasaray SK	Istanbul
	Halit 57'p	(Report)	Latif 12'; Rebii 76'	Stadium: Taksim Stadi; Referee: Hikmet Barlan

22 November 1929 2	Galatasaray SK	5–2	Vefa SK	Istanbul
	Muslih 29'; Necdet 33'; Latif 47'; Kemal 60'; Nihat 83'	(Report)	Selahattin 16'p Muhteşem 68'p	Stadium: Taksim Stadi; Referee: Ahmet Şerafettin Bey

29 November 1929 3	Fenerbahçe SK	3–2	Galatasaray SK	Istanbul
	Zeki Rıza 31', 77'; Alaaddin 40'	(Report)	Latif 20'; Kadri 38'og	Stadium: Taksim Stadi; Referee: Kemal Halim Gürgen

20 December 1929 4	Istanbulspor	0–6	Galatasaray SK	Istanbul
		(Report)	Necdet 8', 44', 79'; Latif 35'; Kemal 44'; Burhan 60'	Stadium: Taksim Stadi; Referee: Refik Osman Top

24 January 1930 5	Beşiktaş JK	1–1	Galatasaray SK	Istanbul
	Mustafa 63'	(Report)	Necdet 80'p	Stadium: Taksim Stadi; Referee: Saim Turgut Aktansel

28 February 1930 6	Galatasaray SK	2–2	Beykoz 1908 S.K.D.	Istanbul
	Muslih; Muammer	(Report)	? ?	Stadium: Taksim Stadi; Referee: Saim Turgut Aktansel

21 March 1930 7	Vefa SK	1–4	Galatasaray SK	Istanbul
	Muhteşem 21'	(Report)	Kemal 7'; Mehmet 50', 85'; Nihat 57'	Stadium: Taksim Stadi; Referee: Ahmet Şerafettin Bey

28 March 1930 8	Galatasaray SK	1–1	Fenerbahçe SK	Istanbul
	Rebii 83'	(Report)	Zeki Rıza 75'	Stadium: Taksim Stadi; Referee: Kemal Halim Gürgen

2 May 1930 9	Galatasaray SK	6–0	İstanbulspor	Istanbul
	Kemal 13'; Rebii 15', 32'; Necdet 57', 79'; Vedat 65'	(Report)		Stadium: Taksim Stadi; Referee: Basri Bütün

30 May 1930 10	Galatasaray SK	1–0	Beşiktaş JK	Istanbul
	Necdet 23'	(Report)		Stadium: Taksim Stadi; Referee: Kemal Halim Gürgen

=== İstanbul Shield ===
Kick-off listed in local time (EEST)

İstanbul Shield Game	Beylerbeyi SK	0–8	Galatasaray SK	Istanbul
		Report

İstanbul Shield Game	Üsküdar Anadolu SK	0–12	Galatasaray SK	Istanbul
		Report

March 14, 1930 İstanbul Shield Game	Fenerbahçe SK	3–1	Galatasaray SK	Istanbul
		Report

=== Friendly Matches ===
October 18, 1929, Friday Friendly Game	HMS Queen Elizabeth (1913) Crew	5–2	Galatasaray SK	Taksim Stadium
		First half 1-1	? 2'; Kemal 85'	Referee: Hamdi Emin Çap

January 7, 1930, Friday Friendly Game	Oskar II English School Ship Crew	1–9	Galatasaray SK	Istanbul
