= 1926–27 Galatasaray S.K. season =

Galatasaray
1926–27 season
- President: (Turkey) Ali Haydar Şekip (25 September 1926) (Turkey) Adnan İbrahim Pirioğlu
- Manager: (Scotland) Billy Hunter
- Stadium: Taksim Stadı
- Istanbul Lig: 1st
- Top goalscorer: League: Mehmet Leblebi (6); All: Mehmet Leblebi (6)
Home colours	Away colours

The 1926–27 season was Galatasaray SK's 23rd in existence and the club's 17th consecutive season in the Istanbul Football League.

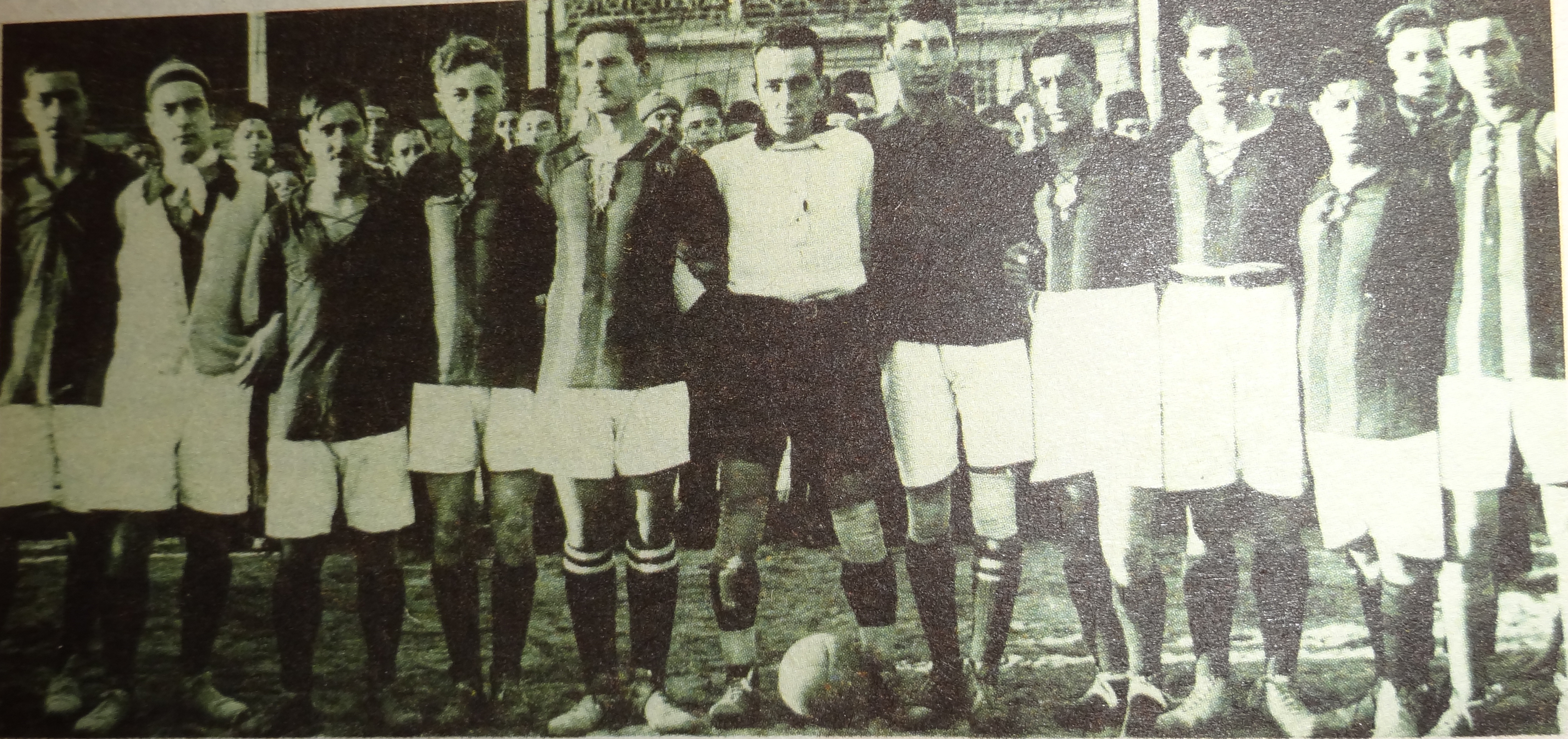
Galatasaray SK 1926–27 Champion Team

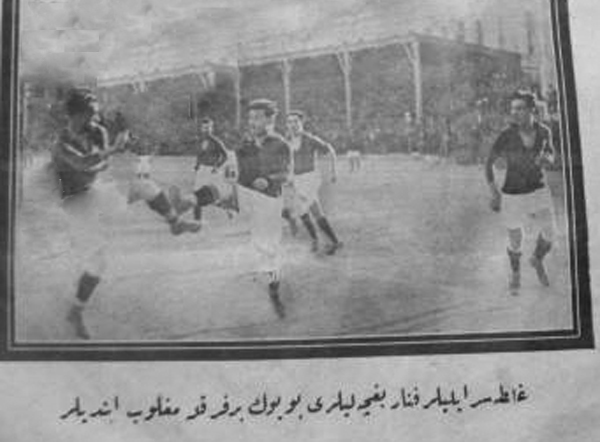
Galatasaray 5 – Fenerbahçe 1

== Squad statistics ==
No.	Pos.	Name	IFL		Total	
No.	Pos.	Name	Apps	Goals	Apps	Goals
-	GK	(Turkey) Ulvi Yenal	6	0	6	0
-	GK	(Turkey) Rasim Atala	1	0	1	0
-	DF	(Turkey) Mehmet Nazif Gerçin	0	0	0	0
-	DF	(Turkey) Burhan Atak	5	0	5	0
-	DF	(Turkey) Şakir Baruer	3	0	3	0
-	DF	(Turkey) Kerim Özdor	2	0	2	0
-	DF	(Turkey) Abdurrahman Atlı	1	0	1	0
-	MF	(Turkey) Kemal Rıfat Kalpakçıoğlu	6	0	6	0
-	MF	(Turkey) Nihat Bekdik (C)	6	0	6	0
-	MF	(Turkey) Suphi Batur	7	0	7	0
-	FW	(Turkey) Mehmet Leblebi	5	0	5	0
-	FW	(Turkey) Ercüment Işıl	7	0	7	0
-	FW	(Turkey) Kemal Faruki	1	0	1	0
-	FW	(Turkey) Vedat Abut	1	0	1	0
-	FW	(Turkey) Muhtar	1	0	1	0
-	FW	(Turkey) Mithat Ertuğ	7	0	7	0
-	FW	(Turkey) Muslihiddin Peykoğlu	7	0	7	0
-	FW	(Turkey) Rebii Erkal	5	0	5	0
-	FW	(Turkey) Emin	1	0	1	0

== Squad changes for the 1926–27 season ==
In: Note: Flags indicate national team as defined under FIFA eligibility rules; some limited exceptions apply. Players may hold more than one non-FIFA nationality.

No.	Pos.	Nation	Player
-		TUR	Ercüment Işıl (from Galatasaray High School)
-		TUR	Rebii Erkal (from Galatasaray High School)

== Competitions ==
=== İstanbul Football League ===
==== Standings ====
Pos	Team	Pld	W	D	L	GF	GA	GD	Pts
1	Galatasaray SK	7	6	1	0	26	6	+20	20
2	Fenerbahçe SK	7	4	2	1	24	10	+14	17
3	Küçükçekmece SK	7	3	1	3	14	14	0	14
4	Harbiye SK	7	3	1	3	10	6	+4	13 (Note: 1 point deducted?)
5	Vefa SK	7	3	0	4	14	13	+1	13
6	Beykoz 1908 S.K.D.	7	2	2	3	14	14	0	13
7	Beşiktaş JK	7	1	4	2	8	11	−3	12 (Note: 1 point deducted?)
8	Beylerbeyi SK	7	0	1	6	4	40	−36	8

==== Matches ====
Kick-off listed in local time (EEST)

26 November 1926 1	Galatasaray SK	2–2	Beykoz 1908 S.K.D.	Istanbul
14:15 EET	n/a (?); Nihat Bekdik 27' (pen.)	(Report)	n/a (?); Sait Foto 85'	Stadium: Taksim Stadı; Referee: Necmettin Çakar

31 December 1926 2	Galatasaray SK	8–0	Beylerbeyi SK	Istanbul
15:00 EET	Ercüment Işıl 44' n/a (?) n/a (?) n/a (?) n/a (?) n/a (?) n/a (?) n/a (?)	(Report)		Stadium: Taksim Stadı; Referee: İzzet Bey

14 January 1927 3	Galatasaray SK	3–0	Beşiktaş JK	Istanbul
15:00 EET	Mehmet Leblebi 30', 70'; Rebii Erkal 65'	(Report)		Stadium: Taksim Stadı; Referee: Zeki Rıza Sporel

11 March 1927 4	Galatasaray SK	1–0	Harbiye SK	Istanbul
16:50 EET	Ercüment Işıl 68'	(Report)		Stadium: Taksim Stadı; Referee: Burhanettin Felek

18 March 1927 5	Galatasaray SK	2–1	Küçükçekmece SK	Istanbul
16:00 EET	Mehmet Leblebi 12', 20'	(Report)	Latif Yalınlı 70'	Stadium: Taksim Stadı; Referee: Necmettin Çakar

1 April 1927 6	Galatasaray SK	5–1	Fenerbahçe SK	Istanbul
17:00 EET	Mehmet Leblebi 15'; Ercüment Işıl 35', 48'; Rebii Erkal 41', 83'	(Report)	Sedat Taylan 80' (pen.)	Stadium: Taksim Stadı; Referee: Abdullah Bey

22 April 1927 7	Galatasaray SK	5–2	Vefa SK	Istanbul
17:00 EET	Muslih Peykoğlu 12'; Burhan Atak 39', 48' (pen.); Mehmet Leblebi 71'; Mithat Ertuğ 74'	(Report)	Hayri Ragıp 43'; Şekip 55'	Stadium: Taksim Stadı; Referee: Necmettin Çakar

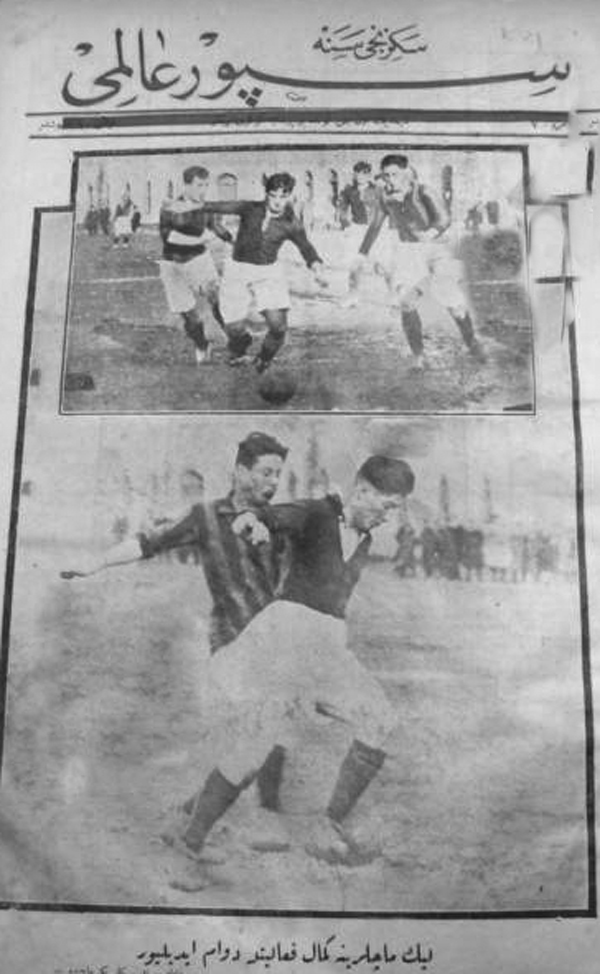
Galatasaray 8 - Beylerbeyi 0

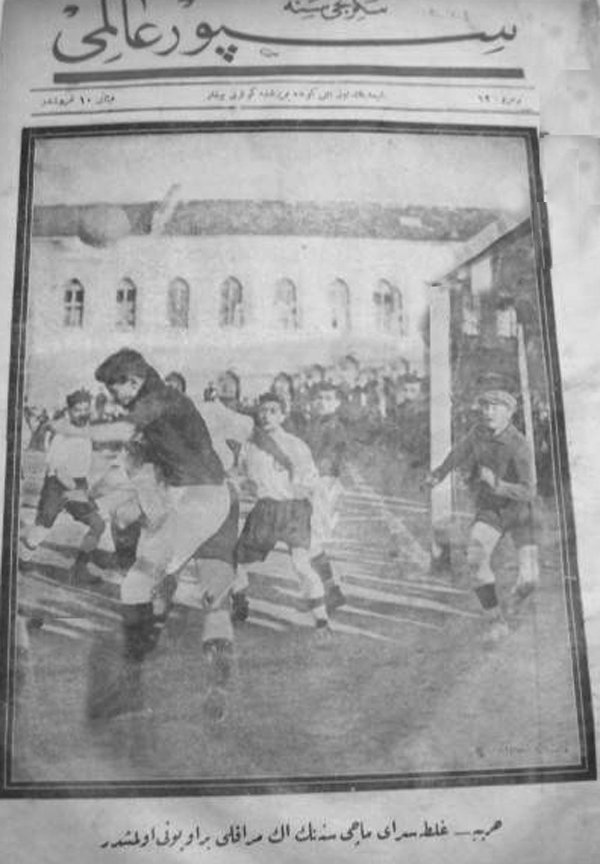
Galatasaray 1 - Harbiye 0

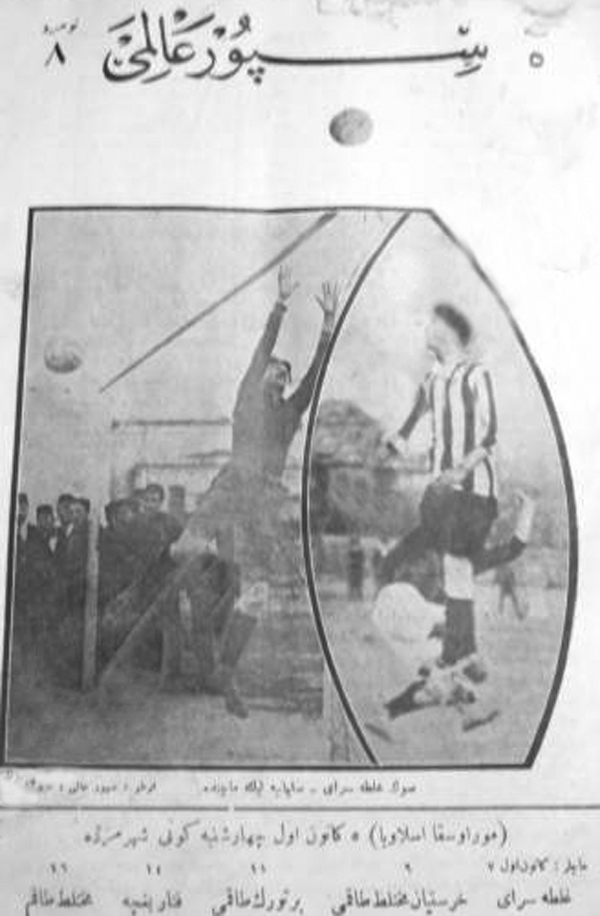
Galatasaray 2 - Küçükçekmece 1

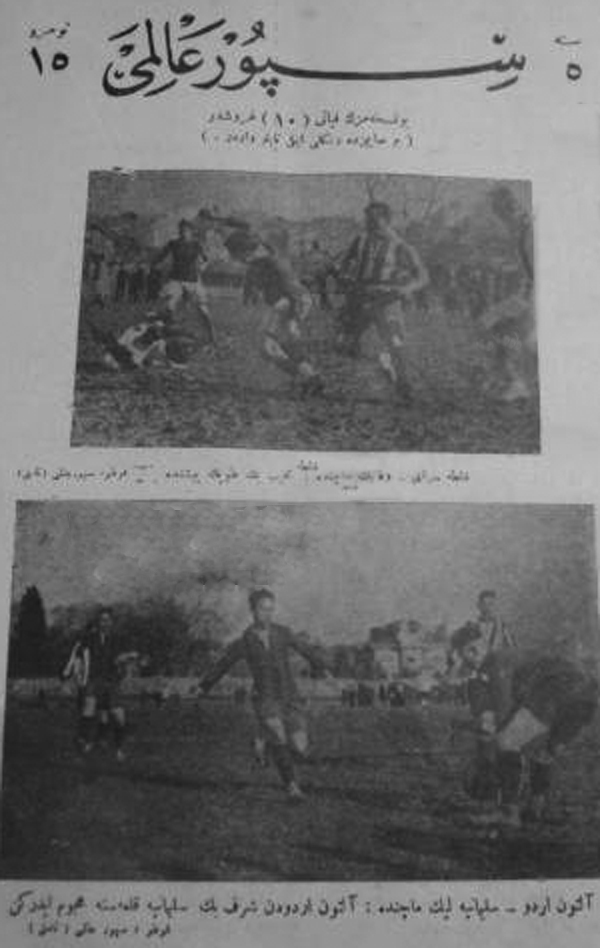
Galatasaray 5 - Vefa 2

=== Friendly matches ===
Kick-off listed in local time (EEST)

August 14, 1926 Friendly Game	Galatasaray SK	0–6	Al Ittihad	Istanbul

December 5, 1926 Friendly Game	Galatasaray SK	1–1	Levski Sofia	Istanbul
		Levski left match. Match could not be concluded.
