= 1933–34 Galatasaray S.K. season =

Galatasaray
1933–34 season
- President: Ali Haydar Barşal
- Manager: Syd Puddefoot
- Stadium: Taksim Stadı
- Istanbul Lig: 3rd
- Istanbul Şildi: Semi Final
- Top goalscorer: League: Fazıl Özkaptan (4); All: Fazıl Özkaptan (4)
Home colours

The 1933–34 season was Galatasaray SK's 30th in existence and the club's 22nd consecutive season in the Istanbul Football League.

In this season, 25 of Galatasaray's members, including some founders, left the club to build a new one called Güneş SK in 1933. It was their reaction to Fethi İsfendiyaroğlu' decision to exclude Eşref Şefik Atabey from the club. İsfendiyaroğlu was Galatasaray's president, and also the principal of the Galatasaray High School. Atabey had written negative things about Galatasaray in the sports magazine Olympiad.

== Squad statistics ==
No.	Pos.	Name	IFL		IS		Total	
No.	Pos.	Name	Apps	Goals	Apps	Goals	Apps	Goals
-	GK	(Turkey) Rasim Atala	4	0	n/a	n/a	4	0
-	GK	(Turkey) Avni Kurgan	7	0	n/a	n/a	7	0
-	GK	(Turkey) Hızır Hantal	1	0	n/a	n/a	1	0
-	DF	(Turkey) Tevfik Baha	6	0	n/a	n/a	6	0
-	DF	(Turkey) Lütfü Aksoy	7	0	n/a	n/a	7	0
-	DF	(Turkey) Burhan Atak	5	1	n/a	n/a	5	1
-	DF	(Turkey) Faruk Barlas	5	0	n/a	n/a	5	0
-	MF	(Turkey) Nihat Bekdik (C)	6	1	n/a	n/a	6	1
-	MF	(Turkey) Osman Alyanak	1	0	n/a	n/a	1	0
-	MF	(Turkey) Suavi Atasagun	5	0	n/a	n/a	5	0
-	MF	(Turkey) İbrahim Tusder	7	0	n/a	n/a	7	0
-	MF	(Turkey) Kadri Dağ	7	0	n/a	n/a	7	0
-	MF	(Turkey) Muzaffer Tuğ	5	1	n/a	n/a	5	1
-	MF	(Turkey) Fahir Bekdik	5	0	n/a	n/a	5	0
-	FW	(Turkey) Necdet Cici	7	2	n/a	n/a	7	2
-	FW	(Turkey) Fazıl Özkaptan	6	4	n/a	n/a	6	4
-	FW	(Turkey) Rasih Minkari	11	3	n/a	n/a	11	3
-	FW	(Turkey) Muslih Peykoğlu	11	3	n/a	n/a	11	3
-	FW	(Turkey) Enis Bey	2	1	n/a	n/a	2	1
-	FW	(Turkey) Adnan Bindal	1	0	n/a	n/a	1	0
-	FW	(Turkey) Şemsi Abdi	1	0	n/a	n/a	1	0
-	FW	(Turkey) Doğan Akagündüz	4	0	n/a	n/a	4	0
-	FW	(Turkey) Selahattin Buda	4	2	n/a	n/a	4	2
-	FW	(Turkey) Kemal Faruki	2	1	n/a	n/a	2	1
-	FW	(Turkey) Danyal Vuran	12	1	n/a	n/a	12	1

== Squad changes for the 1933–1934 season ==
In: Note: Flags indicate national team as defined under FIFA eligibility rules; some limited exceptions apply. Players may hold more than one non-FIFA nationality.

No.	Pos.	Nation	Player
-		TUR	Fahir Bekdik (from Galatasaray High School)
-		TUR	Muzaffer Tuğ (from Galatasaray High School)
-		TUR	Selahattin Buda (from Galatasaray High School)
-		TUR	Doğan Akagündüz (from Galatasaray High School)
-		TUR	Faruk Barlas (from Galatasaray High School)
-		TUR	Şemsi Abdi (from Galatasaray High School)
-		TUR	Enis Bey (from Galatasaray High School)

== Competitions ==
=== Istanbul Football League ===
==== Standings ====
Pos	Team	Pld	W	D	L	GF	GA	GD	Pts
1	Beşiktaş JK	12	8	3	1	29	16	+13	31
2	Fenerbahçe SK	12	8	2	2	28	8	+20	30
3	Galatasaray SK	12	6	3	3	21	14	+7	27
4	İstanbulspor	12	5	1	6	21	17	+4	23
5	Vefa SK	12	5	0	7	16	24	−8	22
6	Beykoz 1908 S.K.D.	12	3	3	6	17	26	−9	21
7	Küçükçekmece SK	12	0	2	10	10	37	−27	14

==== Matches ====
Kick-off listed in local time (EEST)

24 November 1933 1	Fenerbahçe SK	1–0	Galatasaray SK	Istanbul
14:30	Niyazi 43'	(Report)		Stadium: Fenerbahçe Stadı; Referee: Nuri Bosut

8 December 1933 2	Küçükçekmece SK	0–3	Galatasaray SK	Istanbul
		(Report)	Rasih 14'; Fazıl 30', 35'	Stadium: Taksim Stadı; Referee: Basri Bütün

5 January 1934 3	Galatasaray SK	2–1	Beykoz 1908 S.K.D.	Istanbul
14:30	Rasih 44'; Behçet Bey 81'og	(Report)	Bahadır 70'	Stadium: Fenerbahçe Stadı; Referee: Cafer Çağatay

12 January 1934 4	Galatasaray SK	3–0	İstanbulspor	Istanbul
14:30	Fazıl 1', 23'; Danyal 60'	(Report)		Stadium: Fenerbahçe Stadı; Referee: Ahmet Adem Göğdün

19 January 1934 5	Vefa SK	1–2	Galatasaray SK	Istanbul
15:00	Muhteşem 15'	(Report)	Rasih 10'; Necdet 66'	Stadium: Fenerbahçe Stadı; Referee: Basri Bütün

2 February 1934 6	Beşiktaş JK	2–2	Galatasaray SK	Istanbul
15:00	Hayati 50'; Hakkı 53'	(Report)	Nihat 25'; Necdet 35'p	Stadium: Fenerbahçe Stadı; Referee: Nuri Bosut

*23 February 1934 6	Fenerbahçe SK	0–0	Galatasaray SK	Istanbul
15:00		[Match was cancelled. Kavgalı maç (Report)]		Stadium: Taksim Stadium; Referee: Nuri Bosut

9 March 1934 7	Galatasaray SK	3–1	Küçükçekmece SK	Istanbul
15:00	Burhan 1'; Selahattin 7'; Muslih 52'	(Report)	Ali 81'	Stadium: Fenerbahçe Stadı; Referee: Ahmet Adem Göğdün

16 March 1934 8	Galatasaray SK	2–2	Beşiktaş JK	Istanbul
16:00	Muzaffer 8'; Muslih 21'	(Report)	Nazım 27', 85'	Stadium: Fenerbahçe Stadı; Referee: Ahmet Adem Göğdün

6 April 1934 9	Beykoz 1908 S.K.D.	2–1	Galatasaray SK	Istanbul
15:30	Bahadır 25'p Rıdvan 41'	(Report)	Selahattin 68'	Stadium: Fenerbahçe Stadı; Referee: Sait Selahattin Cihanoğlu

13 April 1934 10	İstanbulspor	2–0	Galatasaray SK	Istanbul
16:00	Selahattin 9', 27'	(Report)		Stadium: Taksim Stadı; Referee: Rüştü Erkuş

20 April 1934 11	Galatasaray SK	3–2	Vefa SK	Istanbul
16:00	Kemal 51'; Enis Bey 63'; Muslih 75'	(Report)	Enver 34'; Muhteşem 40'	Stadium: Fenerbahçe Stadı; Referee: Ahmet Adem Göğdün

11 May 1934 12	Galatasaray SK	0–0	Fenerbahçe SK	Istanbul
16:30		(Report)		Stadium: Taksim Stadı; Referee: Ahmet Adem Göğdün

- After the match on 23 February 1934, Istanbul Football Committee punished 8 players from Galatasaray SK.
  - Tevfik Baha - banned from League for 6 months
  - Avni Kurgan - banned from League for 2 months
  - Nihat Bekdik - banned from League for 2 months
  - Kadri Dağ - banned from League for 2 months
  - Lütfü Aksoy - banned from League for 2 months
  - İbrahim Tusder - banned from League for 2 months
  - Necdet Cici - banned from League for 2 months
  - Fazıl Özkaptan - banned from League for 2 months

=== İstanbul Shield ===
1934 İstanbul Shield	Galatasaray SK	17–1	Altınordu İdman Yurdu SK	Istanbul
		[ (Report)]

1934 İstanbul Shield	Galatasaray SK	4–1	Vefa SK	Istanbul
		[ (Report)]

1934 İstanbul Shield	Galatasaray SK	0–0	Beşiktaş JK	Istanbul
		[ (Report)]

July 13, 1934 İstanbul Shield	Galatasaray SK	1–3	Beşiktaş JK	Istanbul
		[ The referee of the match was the Galatasaray President.(Report)]		Referee: Suphi Batur

=== Friendly Matches ===
September 17, 1933 Friendly Match	Galatasaray SK	3–2	PFC Spartak Varna	Istanbul
		[Bulgarian King Cup Holder Team (Report)]		Stadium: Taksim Stadium

October 31, 1933 Friendly Match	Galatasaray SK	2–1	Ethnikos Asteras F.C.	Istanbul
		[(Report)]		Stadium: Taksim Stadium

November 5, 1933 Friendly Match	Galatasaray SK	2–0	Ethnikos Asteras F.C.	Istanbul
		[(Report)]		Stadium: Taksim Stadium

June 17, 1934 Friendly Match	Galatasaray SK	3–1	Hapoel Tel Aviv F.C.	Istanbul
		[(Report)]		Stadium: Taksim Stadium

July 6, 1934 Friendly Match	Galatasaray SK	1–2	Panathinaikos	Istanbul
		[(Report)]		Stadium: Taksim Stadium

=== Şeref Turnuvası ===
29 October 1934	Fenerbahçe SK	1–0	Galatasaray SK	Istanbul
14:00	Fikret Arıcan 47'	(Report)		Stadium: Taksim Stadı; Referee: Adnan Akın

4 November 1934	Beşiktaş JK	1–1	Galatasaray SK	Istanbul
14:00	Şeref Görkey 85'	(Report)	Feyzi Uman 55'og	Stadium: Taksim Stadı; Referee: Kemal Halim Gürgen
