= 1920–21 Galatasaray S.K. season =

Galatasaray
1920–21 season
- President: Refik Cevdet Kalpakçıoğlu
- Manager: Necip Şahin Erson
- Stadium: Taksim Stadı
- Istanbul Lig: 2nd
Home colours	Away colours

The 1920–21 season was Galatasaray SK's 17th in existence and the club's 11th consecutive season in the Istanbul Football League.

== Squad statistics ==
No.	Pos.	Name	IFL		Total	
No.	Pos.	Name	Apps	Goals	Apps	Goals
-	GK	(Turkey) Adil Giray (C)	5	0	5	0
-	DF	(Turkey) Nusret Toysal	3	0	3	0
-	DF	(Turkey) Hüseyin Ustrumcalı	2	0	2	0
-	DF	(Turkey) Ahmet Cevat Baydar	8	0	8	0
-	DF	(Turkey) Kemalettin	4	0	4	0
-	MF	(Turkey) Edip Ossa	6	0	6	0
-	MF	(Turkey) Nihat Bekdik	7	0	7	0
-	MF	(Turkey) Sabit Cinol	8	0	8	0
-	MF	(Turkey) Fazıl Öziş	3	0	3	0
-	MF	(Turkey) Suat Subay	7	0	7	0
-	MF	(Turkey) Necip Şahin Erson	8	0	8	0
-	FW	(Turkey) Sadi Karsan	8	0	8	0
-	FW	(Turkey) Müçteba Remzi	6	0	6	0
-	FW	(Turkey) Namık Canko	0	0	0	0
-	FW	(Turkey) Adnan İbrahim Pirioğlu	4	0	4	0
-	FW	(Turkey) Burhan Atak	1	0	1	0
-	FW	(Turkey) Selahattin Dooğan	1	0	1	0
-	FW	(Hungary) Béla Balassa	1	0	1	0
-	FW	(Turkey) Sadi Kurt	2	0	2	0

== Competitions ==
=== İstanbul Football League ===
==== Standings ====
Pos	Team	Pld	W	D	L	GF	GA	GD	Pts
1	Fenerbahçe SK	8	7	0	1	27	8	+19	22
2	Galatasaray SK	8	4	1	3	20	18	+2	17
3	Altınordu İdman Yurdu SK	8	3	2	3	12	14	−2	15 (Note: 1 point deducted?)
4	Üsküdar Anadolu SK	8	2	2	4	13	17	−4	14
5	Küçükçekmece SK	8	0	3	5	12	27	−15	11

==== Matches ====
Kick-off listed in local time (EEST)

17 December 1920 1	Galatasaray SK	1–4	Fenerbahçe SK	Istanbul
		(Report)	Zeki Rıza (?); Hüsnü (?); Sabih (?)	Stadium: Taksim Stadı

7 January 1921 2	Galatasaray SK	1–1	Altınordu İdman Yurdu SK	Istanbul
		(Report)		Stadium: Taksim Stadı

18 February 1921 3	Galatasaray SK	5–4	Küçükçekmece SK	Istanbul
		(Report)		Stadium: Taksim Stadı

25 February 1921 4	Galatasaray SK	6–2	Üsküdar Anadolu SK	Istanbul
		(Report)		Stadium: Taksim Stadı

1 April 1921 5	Fenerbahçe SK	4–0	Galatasaray SK	Istanbul
	Sabih (?); Zeki Rıza (?); Alaeddin (?) ? (?)	(Report)		Stadium: Taksim Stadı

8 April 1921 6	Altınordu İdman Yurdu SK	0–2	Galatasaray SK	Istanbul
		(Report)		Stadium: Taksim Stadı

29 April 1921 7	Küçükçekmece SK	1–5	Galatasaray SK	Istanbul
		(Report)		Stadium: Taksim Stadı

13 May 1921 8	Üsküdar Anadolu SK	2–0	Galatasaray SK	Istanbul
		(Report)		Stadium: Taksim Stadı

=== Friendly matches ===
6 October 1921	AC Sparta Prague	12–0	Galatasaray SK	Prague
		(Report)

==== Galatasaray Cup ====
Galatasaray won the cup.

1921	Galatasaray SK	1–0	Vefa SK	Istanbul

1921	Galatasaray SK	1–1	Üsküdar Anadolu SK	Istanbul

1921	Galatasaray SK	3–0	Üsküdar Anadolu SK	Istanbul
		Won by decision

1921	Galatasaray SK	2–1	Armenian Team	Istanbul
		Won by decision

June 2, 1921	Galatasaray SK	2–1	Fenerbahçe SK	Istanbul
