= 1934–35 Galatasaray S.K. season =

Galatasaray
1934–35 season
- President: (Turkey) Ali Haydar Barşal (until 12 August 1934) (Turkey) Refik Cevdet Kalpakçıoğlu (until 8 February 1935) (Turkey) Ethem Menemencioğlu
- Manager: (England) Syd Puddefoot (until October 1934) (Austria) Hans Baar
- Stadium: Taksim Stadı
- Istanbul Lig: 2nd
- Istanbul Şildi: Quarter final
- Top goalscorer: League: Danyal Vuran (7); All: Danyal Vuran (7)
| Home colours | Away colours |

The 1934–35 season was Galatasaray SK's 31st in existence and the club's 23rd consecutive season in the Istanbul Football League.

== Squad statistics ==
| No. | Pos. | Name | IFL | | IS | | Total | |
| No. | Pos. | Name | Apps | Goals | Apps | Goals | Apps | Goals |
|---|---|---|---|---|---|---|---|---|
| - | GK | (Turkey) Hızır Hantal | 1 | 0 | n/a | n/a | 1 | 0 |
| - | GK | (Turkey) Avni Kurgan | 13 | 0 | n/a | n/a | 13 | 0 |
| - | DF | (Turkey) Lütfü Aksoy | 11 | 2 | n/a | n/a | 11 | 2 |
| - | DF | (Turkey) Faruk Barlas | 2 | 0 | n/a | n/a | 2 | 0 |
| - | MF | (Turkey) Nihat Bekdik (C) | 9 | 2 | n/a | n/a | 9 | 2 |
| - | MF | (Turkey) Osman Alyanak | 13 | 0 | n/a | n/a | 13 | 0 |
| - | MF | (Turkey) Suavi Atasagun | 6 | 0 | n/a | n/a | 6 | 0 |
| - | MF | (Turkey) İbrahim Tusder | 13 | 1 | n/a | n/a | 13 | 1 |
| - | MF | (Turkey) Kadri Dağ | 7 | 1 | n/a | n/a | 7 | 1 |
| - | MF | (Turkey) Fahir Bekdik | 7 | 0 | n/a | n/a | 7 | 0 |
| - | MF | (Turkey) Bekir Arun | 2 | 0 | n/a | n/a | 2 | 0 |
| - | FW | (Turkey) Necdet Cici | 13 | 4 | n/a | n/a | 13 | 4 |
| - | FW | (Turkey) Fazıl Özkaptan | 11 | 5 | n/a | n/a | 11 | 5 |
| - | FW | (Turkey) Münevver Epirden | 14 | 5 | n/a | n/a | 14 | 5 |
| - | FW | (Turkey) Rasih Minkari | 2 | 1 | n/a | n/a | 2 | 1 |
| - | FW | (Turkey) Adnan Bindal | 3 | 0 | n/a | n/a | 3 | 0 |
| - | FW | (Turkey) Şemsi Abdi | 1 | 1 | n/a | n/a | 1 | 1 |
| - | FW | (Turkey) Selahattin Buda | 7 | 4 | n/a | n/a | 7 | 4 |
| - | FW | (Turkey) Cafer Akyaz | 4 | 1 | n/a | n/a | 4 | 1 |
| - | FW | (Turkey) Danyal Vuran | 14 | 7 | n/a | n/a | 14 | 7 |

== Squad changes for the 1934–35 season ==
In: Note: Flags indicate national team as defined under FIFA eligibility rules; some limited exceptions apply. Players may hold more than one non-FIFA nationality.

| No. | Pos. | Nation | Player |
|---|---|---|---|
| - | | TUR | Münevver Epirden (from Galatasaray High School) |
| - | | TUR | Cafer Akyaz (from Küçükçekmece SK) |
| - | | TUR | Bekir Arun (from Galatasaray B Team) |
| - | | TUR | Adnan Bindal (from Konyaspor) |

== Competitions ==
=== Istanbul Football League ===
==== Standings ====
| Pos | Team | Pld | W | D | L | GF | GA | GD | Pts |
|---|---|---|---|---|---|---|---|---|---|
| 1 | Fenerbahçe SK | 12 | 9 | 2 | 1 | 50 | 15 | +35 | 31 (Note: 1 point deducted?) |
| 2 | Galatasaray SK | 12 | 9 | 1 | 2 | 35 | 9 | +26 | 31 |
| 3 | Beşiktaş JK | 12 | 8 | 1 | 3 | 31 | 12 | +19 | 29 |
| 4 | İstanbulspor | 12 | 5 | 2 | 5 | 18 | 19 | −1 | 24 |
| 5 | Vefa SK | 12 | 4 | 1 | 7 | 25 | 23 | +2 | 21 |
| 6 | Beykoz 1908 S.K.D. | 12 | 2 | 2 | 8 | 18 | 52 | −34 | 18 |
| 7 | Küçükçekmece SK | 12 | 0 | 2 | 10 | 4 | 51 | −47 | 13 (Note: 1 point deducted?) |

==== Matches ====
Kick-off listed in local time (EEST)

| 12 October 1934 1 | İstanbulspor | 0–1 | Galatasaray SK | Istanbul |
| 15:30 | | (Report) | İbrahim 60' | Stadium: Taksim Stadı; Referee: Basri Bütün |

| 26 October 1934 2 | Vefa SK | 0–1 | Galatasaray SK | Istanbul |
| 15:00 | | (Report) | Rasih Minkari 14' | Stadium: Taksim Stadı; Referee: Adnan Akın |

| 16 November 1934 3 | Galatasaray SK | 10–0 | Küçükçekmece SK | Istanbul |
| | Nihat Bekdik 1', 53'; Münevver Epirden 2'; Necdet Cici 25', 47'; Danyal Vuran 59'p Fazıl Özkaptan 77', 86'; Lütfü Aksoy 79'; Kadri Dağ 84' | (Report) | | Stadium: Taksim Stadı; Referee: Adnan Akın |

| 23 November 1934 4 | Galatasaray SK | 5–1 | Beykoz 1908 S.K.D. | Istanbul |
| | Selahattin Buda 9', 71'; Danyal Vuran 33', 36'; Münevver Epirden 82' | (Report) | Şahap Yengingüç 50' | Stadium: Taksim Stadı; Referee: Rüştü Erkuş |

| 30 November 1934 5 | Fenerbahçe SK | 0–0 | Galatasaray SK | Istanbul |
| | | (Report) | | Stadium: Taksim Stadı; Referee: Ahmet Adem Göğdün |

| 21 December 1934 6 | Galatasaray SK | 0–2 | Beşiktaş JK | Istanbul |
| | | (Report) | Nazım Onar 25'; Hayati Ozgan 60' | Stadium: Şeref Stadı; Referee: Nuri Bosut |

| 11 January 1935 7 | Galatasaray SK | 4–2 | İstanbulspor | Istanbul |
| | Fahri Paçalıoğlu 21'og Necdet Cici 43'; Danyal Vuran 70', 87' | (Report) | Selahattin Almay 13', 84' | Stadium: Şeref Stadı; Referee: Saim Turgut Aktansel |

| 18 January 1935 8 | Beşiktaş JK | 2–1 | Galatasaray SK | Istanbul |
| | Nazım Onar 47'; Hakkı Yeten 70' | (Report) | Selahattin Buda 17' | Stadium: Şeref Stadı; Referee: Kemal Halim Gürgen |

| 25 January 1935 9 | Galatasaray SK | 2–1 | Vefa SK | Istanbul |
| | Selahattin Buda 19'; Münevver Epirden 35'p | (Report) | Enver Şahiner 14' | Stadium: Fenerbahçe Stadı; Referee: Kemal Halim Gürgen |

| 15 February 1935 10 | Küçükçekmece SK | 0–4 | Galatasaray SK | Istanbul |
| | | (Report) | Danyal Vuran 10', 13'; Fazıl Özkaptan 18'; Cafer Akyaz 86' | Stadium: Şeref Stadı; Referee: Halit Galip Ezgü |

| 22 February 1935 11 | Beykoz 1908 S.K.D. | 1–4 | Galatasaray SK | Istanbul |
| | Sait Foto 16' | (Report) | Necdet Cici 7', 27'; Münevver Epirden 23'; Lütfü Aksoy 29' | Stadium: Fenerbahçe Stadı; Referee: Saim Turgut Aktansel |

| 1 March 1935 12 | Galatasaray SK | 4–0 | Fenerbahçe SK | Istanbul |
| | Fazıl Özkaptan 7', 34'; Adnan Bindal 70'; Münevver Epirden 79'p | (Report) | | Stadium: Fenerbahçe Stadı; Referee: Şazi Tezcan |

| 8 March 1935 Finals | Galatasaray SK | 0–0 | Fenerbahçe SK | Istanbul |
| | | (Report) | | Stadium: Taksim Stadı; Referee: Şazi Tezcan |

| 15 March 1935 Finals | Fenerbahçe SK | 1–0 | Galatasaray SK | Istanbul |
| | Niyazi Sel 105' | (Report) | | Stadium: Fenerbahçe Stadı; Referee: Şazi Tezcan |

=== İstanbul Shield ===
| 1935 1/16 Final | Galatasaray SK | 8–1 | Doğanspor | Istanbul |
| | | [ (Report)] | | Stadium: Taksim Stadı |

| 1935 1/8 Final | Galatasaray SK | 8–1 | Haliç SK | Istanbul |
| | | [ (Report)] | | Stadium: Taksim Stadı |

| May 10, 1935 1/4 Final | Fenerbahçe SK | 2–1 | Galatasaray SK | Istanbul |
| | Fikret Arıcan 23'(p); Naci Bastoncu 88' | [ First Half 1-1 (Report)] | Necdet Cici 44' | Stadium: Fenerbahçe Stadı |

=== Friendly Matches ===
| 15 October 1934 1 | French Navy | 0–20 | Galatasaray SK | Istanbul |
| | | [ (Report)] | | Stadium: Taksim Stadium |

| 12 April 1935 1 | FC Libertas Wien | 0–0 | Galatasaray SK | Istanbul |
| | | [ (Report)] | | Stadium: Taksim Stadium |

| 19 May 1935 1 | Apollon Smyrnis | 3–0 | Galatasaray SK | Istanbul |
| | | [ (Report)] | | Stadium: Taksim Stadium |

| 4 August 1935 1 | Újpest FC A | 1–2 | Galatasaray SK | Istanbul |
| | ? 50' | [First Half 0-0 (Report)] | Fazıl Özkaptan 58'; Gündüz Kılıç 62' | Stadium: Taksim Stadium |

| 15 August 1935 1 | FC Szeged | 3–3 | Galatasaray SK | Hungary |
| | | [ (Report)] |

| 18 August 1935 1 | Békéscsaba 1912 Előre SE | 1–1 | Galatasaray SK | Hungary |
| | | [ (Report)] |

| 20 August 1935 1 | Szarakszavar | 5–2 | Galatasaray SK | Hungary |
| | | [ (Report)] |

| 24 August 1935 1 | FC Juventus București (1924) | 3–2 | Galatasaray SK | Bucharest, Romania |
| | | [ (Report)] |

| 25 August 1935 1 | Unirea Tricolor București | 4–1 | Galatasaray SK | Bucharest, Romania |
| | | [ (Report)] |
