= 1913–14 Galatasaray S.K. season =

Galatasaray
1913–14 season
- President: Ali Sami Yen
- Manager: Emin Bülent Serdaroğlu
- Stadium: Papazın Çayırı
- Istanbul Lig: 4th
Home colours

The 1913–14 season was Galatasaray SK's 10th in existence and the club's 6th consecutive season in the IFL.

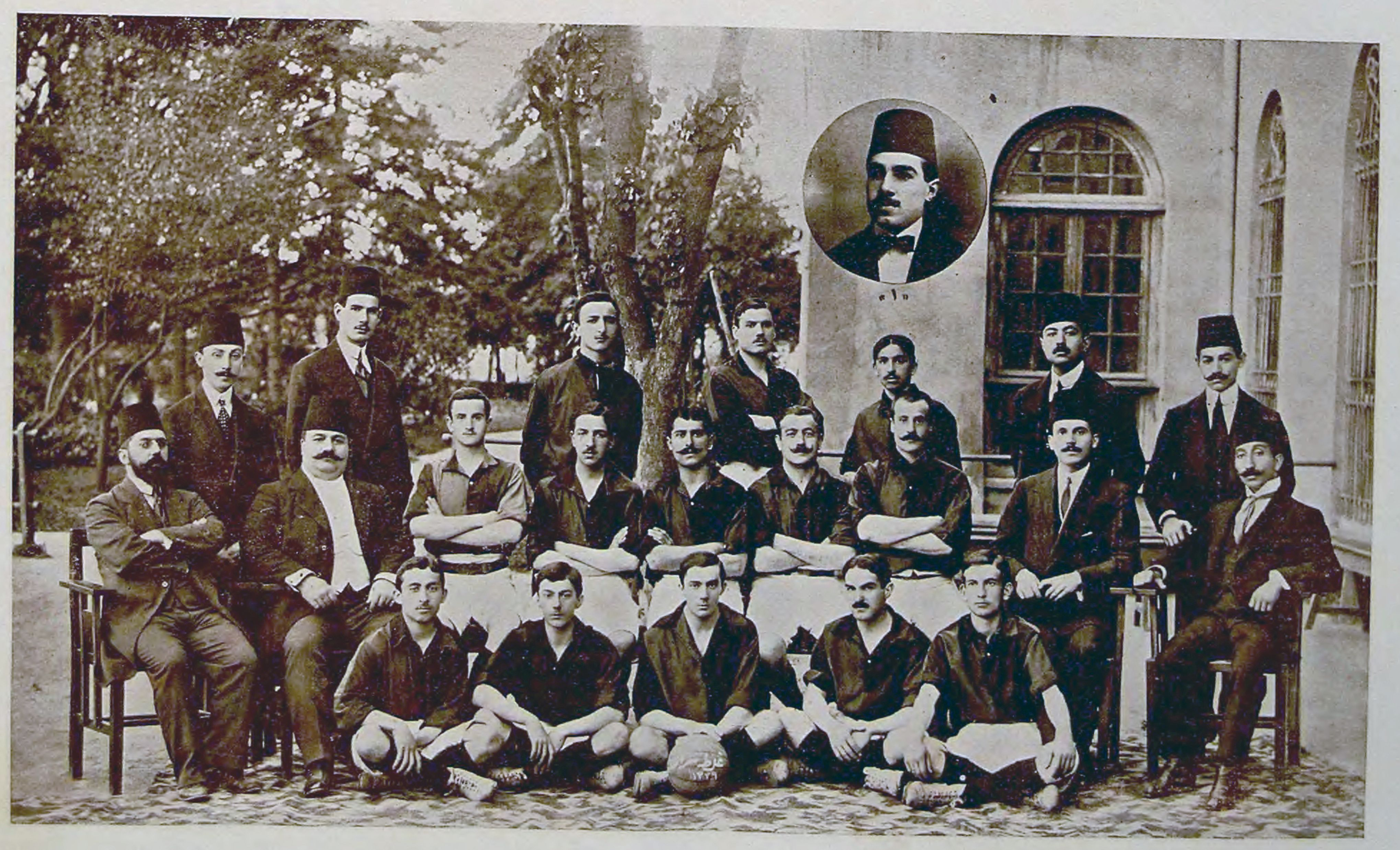
Galatasaray SK Football Team 1914

== Squad statistics ==
| No. | Pos. | Name | IFL | | Total | |
| No. | Pos. | Name | Apps | Goals | Apps | Goals |
|---|---|---|---|---|---|---|
| - | GK | (Turkey) Ahmet Robenson | 0 | 0 | 0 | 0 |
| - | DF | (Turkey) Arif | 0 | 0 | 0 | 0 |
| - | DF | (Turkey) Dr. Namık Canko | 0 | 0 | 0 | 0 |
| - | MF | (Germany) Emil Oberle | 0 | 0 | 0 | 0 |
| - | DF | (Ottoman Empire) Celal İbrahim | 0 | 0 | 0 | 0 |
| - | FW | (Turkey) Emin Bülent Serdaroğlu | 0 | 0 | 0 | 0 |
| - | MF | (Turkey) Hafız Ziya | 0 | 0 | 0 | 0 |
| - | MF | (Turkey) Bekir Sıtkı Bircan | 0 | 0 | 0 | 0 |
| - | MF | (Turkey) Fehmi | 0 | 0 | 0 | 0 |
| - | FW | (Turkey) Ömer Nasrettin | 0 | 0 | 0 | 0 |
| - | FW | (Germany) Schram | 0 | 0 | 0 | 0 |
| - | FW | (Turkey) B. Nedim | 0 | 0 | 0 | 0 |
| - | FW | (Turkey) Sedat | 0 | 0 | 0 | 0 |
| - | FW | (Ottoman Empire) Hasnun Galip | 0 | 0 | 0 | 0 |
| - | FW | (Ottoman Empire) Mıgırdıç Dikranyan | 0 | 0 | 0 | 0 |
| - | FW | (Germany) Schindler | 0 | 0 | 0 | 0 |
| - | FW | (Turkey) Muhsin Yeğen | 0 | 0 | 0 | 0 |
| - | FW | (Turkey) Yusuf Ziya Öniş | 0 | 0 | 0 | 0 |

== Competitions ==
=== Istanbul Football League ===
==== Classification ====
| Pos | Team | Pld | W | D | L | GF | GA | GD | Pts |
|---|---|---|---|---|---|---|---|---|---|
| 1 | Fenerbahçe SK | 10 | 8 | 2 | 0 | 26 | 6 | +20 | 18 |
| 2 | Rumblers FC | 10 | 4 | 4 | 2 | 15 | 12 | +3 | 12 |
| 3 | Progress FC | 10 | 5 | 2 | 3 | 9 | 8 | +1 | 12 |
| 4 | Galatasaray SK | 10 | 3 | 4 | 3 | 14 | 12 | +2 | 10 |
| 5 | Strugglers FC | 9 | 2 | 2 | 5 | 10 | 16 | −6 | 6 |
| 6 | Telefoncular FC | 9 | 0 | 0 | 9 | 1 | 21 | −20 | 0 |

==== Matches ====
Kick-off listed in local time (EEST)

October 19, 1913

| Galatasaray SK | 5 – 0 | Telefoncular FC |
|---|---|---|
| | [ (Report)] |

Union Club Field, Istanbul
Referee: Unknown

February 1, 1914

| Galatasaray SK | 1 – 0 | Telefoncular FC |
|---|---|---|
| | Won by decision |

Union Club Field, Istanbul
Referee: Unknown

November 9, 1913

| Galatasaray SK | 2 – 2 | Strugglers FC |

Union Club Field, Istanbul
Referee: Unknown

February 22, 1914

| Galatasaray SK | 1 – 0 | Strugglers FC |
|---|---|---|
| | Won by decision |

Union Club Field, Istanbul
Referee: Unknown

November 23, 1913

| Galatasaray SK | 1 – 1 | Progress FC |

Union Club Field, Istanbul
Referee: Unknown

March 8, 1914

| Galatasaray SK | 0 – 1 | Progress FC |

Union Club Field, Istanbul
Referee: Unknown

December 14, 1913

| Galatasaray SK | 2 – 2 | Rumblers FC |

Union Club Field, Istanbul
Referee: Unknown

March 29, 1914

| Galatasaray SK | 0 – 2 | Rumblers FC |

Union Club Field, Istanbul
Referee: Unknown

January 4, 1914

| Galatasaray SK | 2 – 4 | Fenerbahçe SK |
|---|---|---|
| | | Hasan Kamil Sporel(3), Sait Selahattin Cihanoğlu |

Union Club Field, Istanbul
Referee: Unknown

| Galatasaray SK | 0 – 0 | Fenerbahçe SK |

Union Club Field, Istanbul
Referee: Unknown

=== Friendly Matches ===
April 6, 1914

| Galatasaray SK | 4 – 2 | Romanian Team |
|---|---|---|
| | [ (Report)] |

Union Club Field, Istanbul
Referee: Unknown

Galatasaray SK:
| GK | 1 | (Turkey) Nedim (c) |
| RB | 2 | (Turkey) Adnan |
| CB | 3 | (Turkey) Ahmet Cevat |
| CB | 4 | (Turkey) Hüseyin |
| LB | 5 | (Turkey) Prens Muhsin |
| RM | 6 | (Turkey) Hasrun |
| CM | 7 | (Turkey) Nasreddin |
| CM | 8 | (Turkey) Celal İbrahim |
| FW | 9 | (Germany) Joseph Oberle |
| FW | 10 | (Turkey) Muzaffer Kazancı |
| FW | 11 | (Germany) Emil Oberle |
Substitutes:
Manager:
(Turkey) Emin Bülent Serdaroğlu

May 1914

| Galatasaray SK | 1 – 0 | SMS Goeben German Battlecruiser Crew |
|---|---|---|
| | [ (Report)] |

Union Club Field, Istanbul
Referee: Unknown

=== Hilâl-i Ahmer Kupası ===
Galatasaray B Team won the cup.

1914

| Galatasaray SK B Team | 5 – 2 | Altınordu İdman Yurdu SK |
|---|---|---|
| | [ (Report)] |

Union Club Field, Istanbul
Referee: Unknown
