= Forty Days and Forty Nights (film) =

- Directed by: Esat Özgül
- Written by: Esat Özgül
- Produced by: Esat Özgül
- Cinematography: Manasi Filmeridis
- Production company: Anadolu Film
- Release date: 1953
- Country: Turkey
- Language: Turkish

Forty Days and Forty Nights (Turkish: Kırk gün kırk gece) is a 1953 Turkish film directed by Esat Özgül.

== Cast ==
- Ismail Dümbüllü
- Nimet Alp
- Temel Karamahmut
- Mücap Ofluoglu
- Feridun Çölgeçen
- Lale Seven
- Osman Alyanak
- Muazzez Arçay

== Bibliography ==
- Türker İnanoğlu. 5555 afişle Türk Sineması. Kabalcı, 2004.
