= Sabih Arca =

Turkish footballer (1901–1979)

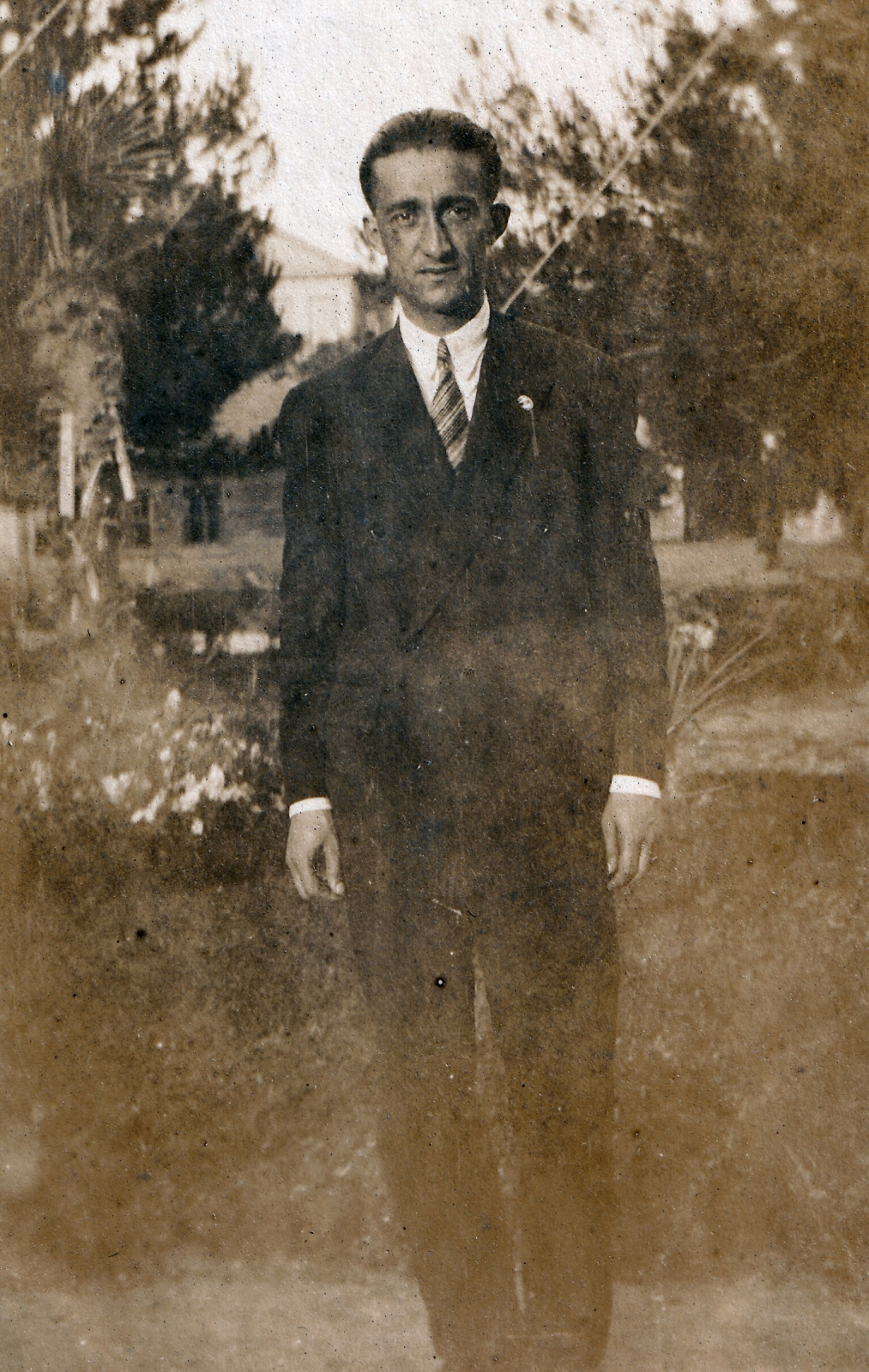
- Arca in 1928

Personal information
- Full name: Sabih Fani Arca
- Date of birth: 1901
- Place of birth: Istanbul, Turkey
- Date of death: 24 April 1979 (aged 77–78)
- Position: Midfielder

Senior career*
Years	Team	Apps	(Gls)
1918–1929	Fenerbahce	215	(64)

International career
1923–1928	Turkey	9	(3)
Medal record
First place	Istanbul Football League	1921
First place	Istanbul Football League	1923
First place	General Harington Cup	1923
- * Club domestic league appearances and goals

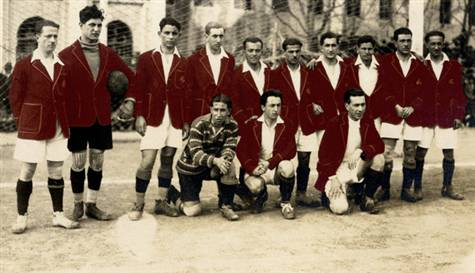
The Fenerbahce–Galatasaray mix, which came to Istanbul on 16 December 1925, right before the match. Sabih Arca is located on the far right of the picture.

Sabih Arca (1901 – 24 April 1979) was a Turkish footballer who played for Fenerbahçe, where he scored 64 goals in 215 matches. He was born in Istanbul. He played as a central midfielder or as a left midfielder. He played for Fenerbahçe between 1918 and 1929 and won the 1920–21 and 1922–23 Istanbul Football League. He was a member of the General Harington Cup squad.

He was included in the first squad of the Turkey national team that played against Romania on 26 October 1923. He scored three goals in nine matches for the national team. On the squads he was included he did not make any appearances at the 1924 Summer Olympics and the 1928 Summer Olympics.
