= Telefoncular F.C. =

Telefoncular FC
- Full name: Telefoncular Football Club
- Founded: 1912
- Dissolved: 1914
- Ground: Papazın Çayırı
Home colours

Telefoncular FC was an association football club which was founded by Englishmen who were employed building the İstanbul Telephone Company in Istanbul in Turkey in 1912. It was closed by the Ottoman Government due to the outbreak of World War I.

== Honours ==
- Istanbul Football League:
  - 6th: 1913–1914

== See also ==
- List of Turkish Sports Clubs by Foundation Dates
