= Reşat =

Reşat is a Turkish given name for males. People named Reşat include:

- Reşat Çağlar, Cypriot diplomat
- Reşat Nuri Güntekin, Turkish novelist
- Reşat Ekrem Koçu, Turkish historian
- Reşat Mursaloğlu, Turkish politician
