= 1930–31 Istanbul Football League =

Istanbul Football League
- Season: 1930–31
- Champions: Galatasaray SK (11th title)

The 1930–31 İstanbul Football League season was the 23rd season of the league. Galatasaray SK won the league for the 11th time.

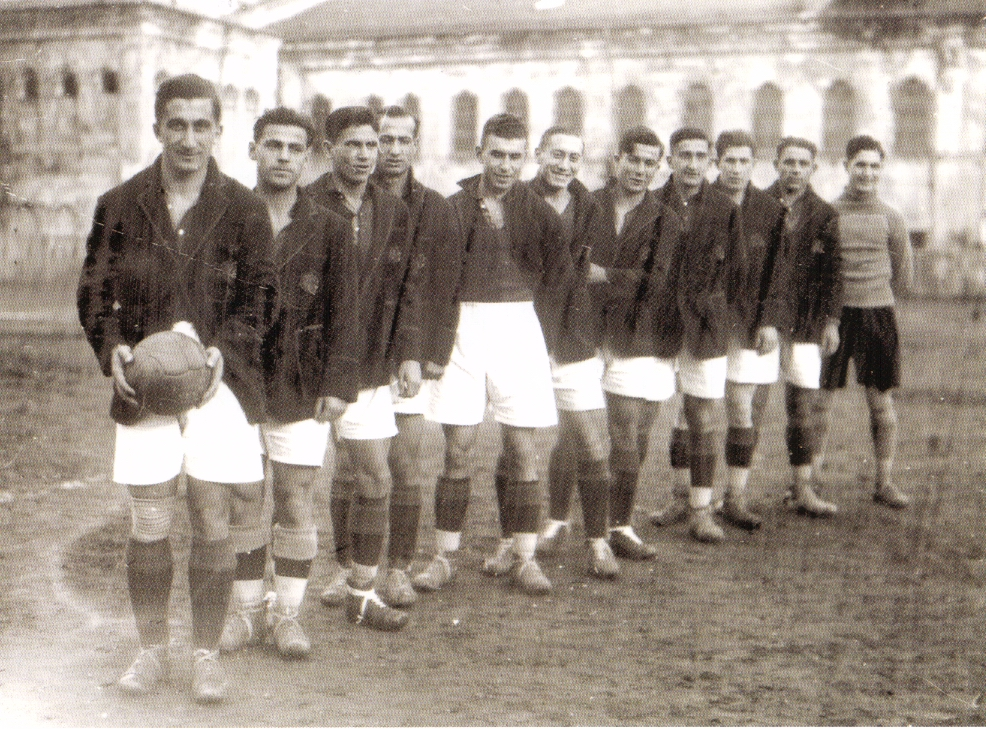
Galatasaray SK 1930-1931 Champion Team

== Season ==
Pos	Team	Pld	W	D	L	GF	GA	GD	Pts
1	Galatasaray SK	14	10	3	1	49	12	+37	37
2	Fenerbahçe SK	14	10	1	3	64	12	+52	35
3	Beşiktaş JK	14	7	4	3	30	11	+19	32
4	Vefa SK	11	7	1	3	33	23	+10	26
5	İstanbulspor	14	5	4	5	21	20	+1	28
6	Beykoz 1908 S.K.D.	14	5	1	8	16	25	−9	23 (Note: 2 points deducted?)
7	Küçükçekmece SK	14	3	3	8	12	43	−31	23
8	Üsküdar Anadolu SK	14	0	1	13	9	84	−75	15
