= Jules Limbeck =

French-Hungarian footballer and manager (1904-1955)

Personal information
- Full name: Jules Limbeck
- Date of birth: October 13, 1904
- Place of birth: Nagyenyed, Austria-Hungary (today Aiud, Romania)
- Date of death: 1955 (aged 50–51)
- Place of death: Unknown
- Position: Forward

Senior career*
Years	Team	Apps	(Gls)
1925–19??	Újpest FC		
- Ferencvárosi TC
- ? (Belgium)
- FK Austria Wien
1934–1935	Amiens	5	(0)

Managerial career
- 1930–1931: Galatasaray S.K.
- 1931–?: Olympique Lyonnais
- Racing
- 1934–1935: Amiens
- 1936: team of Zaporizhia
- 1936: Stal Dnipropetrovsk
- 1936–1937: Dinamo Tbilisi
- 1937: Lokomotiv Moscow
- * Club domestic league appearances and goals

Jules Limbeck (Hungarian: Gyula Limbeck; born in Hungary, died in 1955) was a Franco-Hungarian professional football forward and manager.

== Career ==
He played in various European championships in frontline positions in mid-1920, appeared in the Hungarian Újpest FC, Ferencvárosi TC, in Belgium, and FK Austria Wien.

In 1930 he coached the Turkish Galatasaray S.K. and brought them to the championship. In France, he worked with the Olympique Lyonnais, Racing, Amiens SC (1934–1935).

In 1936 he arrived in the Soviet Union, and spent some time working with the city teams Zaporizhia and Dnipropetrovsk including Stal Dnipropetrovsk, then the order of the All-Union Committee for Physical Culture and Sports of the USSR it was sent to Tbilisi. Limbeck stayed there until March 1937 and worked as chief coach of Dinamo Tbilisi, which reached the finals of the USSR, then he organized a children's football school.

In April 1937 he was appointed a head coach of Lokomotiv Moscow. On August 8, 1937, Limbeck was released from the Soviet Union.

In late 1937 Limbeck returned to Paris where he coached for the Labor Sports and Gymnastics Federation (Fédération sportive et gymnique du travail) which was associated with the French Section of the Workers' International.

== Honours ==
=== Manager ===
Galatasaray S.K.

- Istanbul Football League: 1930–31

FC Dinamo Tbilisi

- Soviet Cup finalist: 1936
