= 1913–14 Istanbul Football League =

Ninth season of the Istanbul Football League

İstanbul Football League
- Season: 1913–14
- Champions: Fenerbahçe (2nd title)
- Matches: 60
- Goals: 106 (1.77 per match)

The 1913–14 İstanbul Football League season was the ninth season of the İstanbul Football League. Fenerbahçe won the league for the second time. Strugglers FC left the league after their sixth match after refusing to change their original kit. Telefoncular FC also left the league after their fifth match. The remaining matches involving these clubs were ruled a 3–0 win for the opposing side. Progress FC changed its name to Altınordu İdman Yurdu SK during the season.

== Season ==
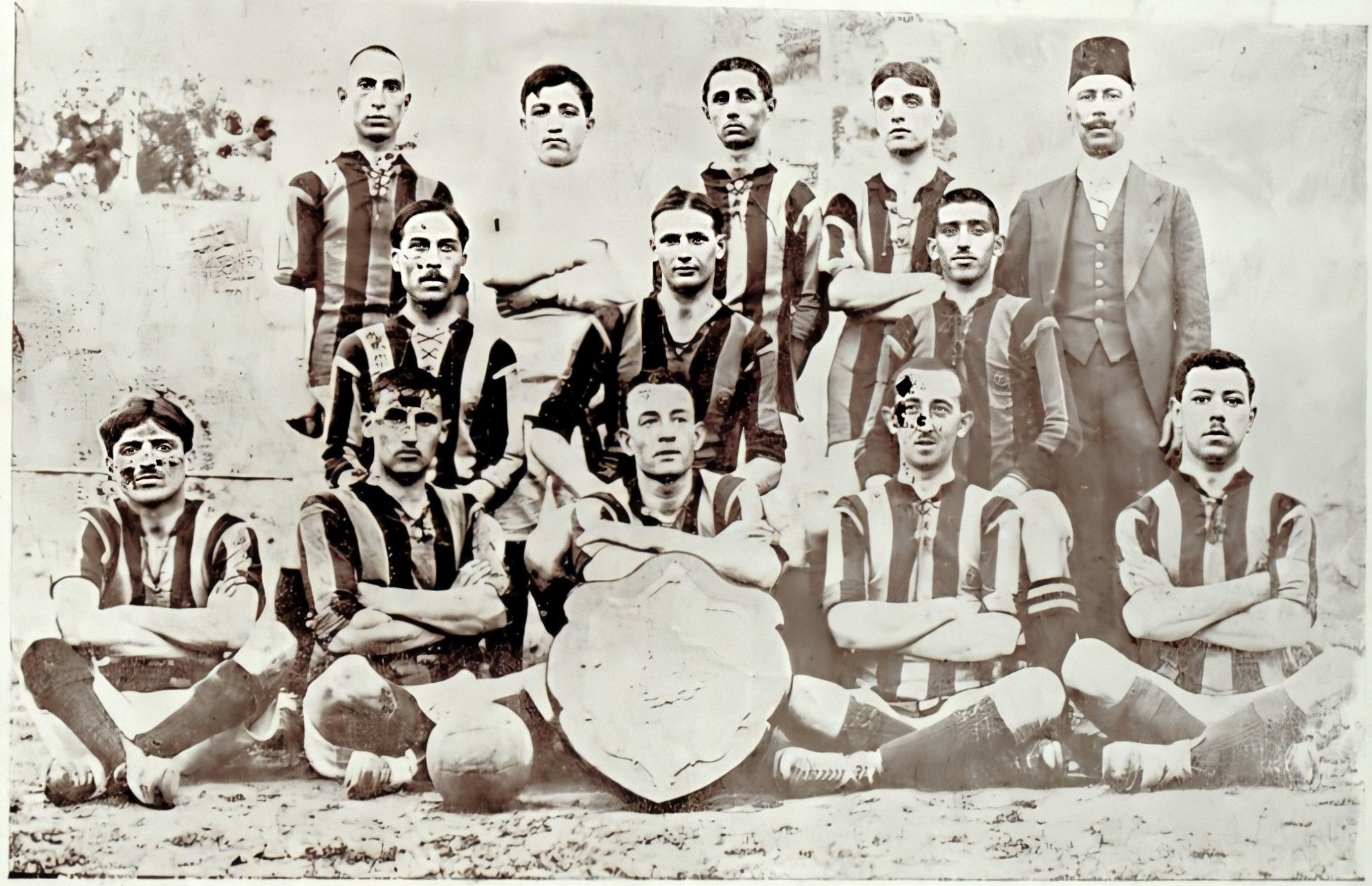
Istanbul Football League - Fenerbahçe SK 1913-14 Champion

Pos	Team	Pld	W	D	L	GF	GA	GD	Pts
1	Fenerbahçe SK	10	8	2	0	26	6	+20	18
2	Rumblers FC	10	4	4	2	15	12	+3	12
3	Progress FC	10	5	2	3	9	8	+1	12
4	Galatasaray SK	10	3	4	3	14	12	+2	10
5	Strugglers FC	9	2	2	5	10	16	−6	6
6	Telefoncular FC	9	0	0	9	1	21	−20	0
