= 1920–21 Istanbul Football League =

İstanbul Football League
- Season: 1920–21
- Champions: Fenerbahçe (3rd title)
- Matches: 40
- Goals: 84 (2.1 per match)

The 1920–21 İstanbul Football League season was the 14th season of the league. Fenerbahçe won the league for the third time. This season used a 3-2-1 point system.

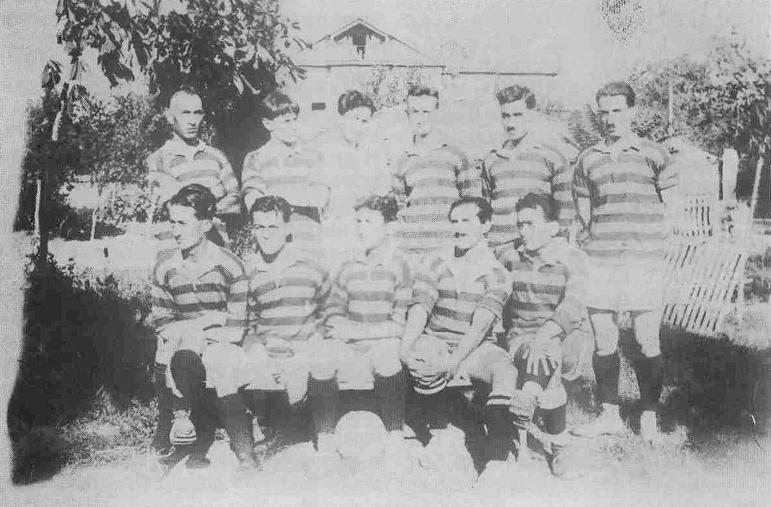
Istanbul Friday League - Fenerbahce SK 1920-21 Champion

== Season ==
Pos	Team	Pld	W	D	L	GF	GA	GD	Pts
1	Fenerbahçe SK	8	7	0	1	27	8	+19	22
2	Galatasaray SK	8	4	1	3	20	18	+2	17
3	Altınordu İdman Yurdu SK	8	3	2	3	12	14	−2	15 (Note: 1 point deducted?)
4	Üsküdar Anadolu SK	8	2	2	4	13	17	−4	14
5	Küçükçekmece SK	8	0	3	5	12	27	−15	11
