= Osman Alyanak =

Turkish footballer and actor

- Born: 1911; Istanbul, Ottoman Empire
- Died: 30 September 1991 (aged 79–80); Istanbul, Turkey
- Occupation: Actor
- Years active: 1930–1990 (actor)

Osman Alyanak (1911 – 30 September 1991) was a Turkish footballer and actor. He played as a right back for Galatasaray S.K. from 1932 to 1936. He appeared in more than one hundred films from 1950 to 1990.

== Selected filmography ==
Year	Title	Role	Notes
1953	Forty Days and Forty Nights		
1966	Law of the Border		
1970	Umut		
1979	Şark Bülbülü		
1981	Zübük		
1987	Night Journey		
