= Latif Yalınlı =

Turkish footballer

Personal information
- Date of birth: 1906
- Date of death: 5 February 1965 (aged 58–59)
- Position: Forward

International career
| Years | Team | Apps | (Gls) |
| 1927–1928 | Turkey | 3 | (0) |

Latif Yalınlı (1906 – 5 February 1965) was a Turkish footballer. He played in three matches for the Turkey national football team from 1927 to 1928. He was also part of Turkey's squad for the football tournament at the 1928 Summer Olympics, but he did not play in any matches.
