= Mehmet Leblebi =

Turkish footballer

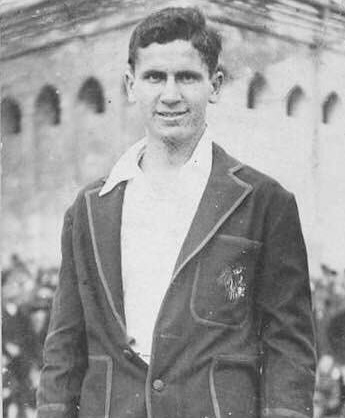

Personal information
- Date of birth: 1908
- Place of birth: Pınarhisar, Ottoman Empire
- Date of death: 25 February 1972 (aged 64)
- Place of death: Istanbul, Turkey
- Position: Forward

Youth career
- 1920–1922: Galatasaray SK

Senior career*
Years	Team	Apps	(Gls)
1922–1936	Galatasaray SK	47	(24)

International career
1924–1932	Turkey	16	(2)
- * Club domestic league appearances and goals

Mehmet Leblebi (1908 – 25 February 1972) was a Turkish professional footballer. He spent the entirety of his career with his hometown club, Galatasaray SK. He also represented Turkey on 16 occasions, and played for them at the 1924 Summer Olympics and the 1928 Summer Olympics.

== Career ==
Leblebi was born in Pınarhisar and played his entire career as a forward and midfielder for Galatasaray SK. Like many other Galatasaray players at that time, he was a student of the Galatasaray High School and started playing football there at the Grand Cour.

Leblebi was selected to Galatasaray A2 team when he was 12. Only three years later, he started to play with Galatasaray's A team,

Leblebi won the Istanbul Football League five times. He also scored 14 goals when Galatasaray beat Vefa SK 20-0 on 20 November 1925.

== Career statistics ==
=== International goals ===
#	Date	Venue	Opponent	Score	Result	Competition
1.	10 April 1925	Taksim Stadium, Istanbul, Turkey	Bulgaria	2-1	2-1	Friendly
2.	1 May 1925	Stadionul Romcomit, Bucharest, Romania	Romania	2-1	2-1	Friendly

== Honours ==
=== As player ===
- Galatasaray
  - Istanbul Football League: 1924–25, 1925–26, 1926–27, 1928–29, 1930–31
  - Istanbul Kupası: 1933

== See also ==
- List of one-club men
