= Avni Kurgan =

Turkish footballer

Personal information
- Date of birth: 17 June 1912
- Position: Goalkeeper

International career
Years	Team	Apps	(Gls)
1931	Turkey	1	(0)

Avni Kurgan (born 17 June 1912, date of death unknown) was a Turkish footballer. He played in one match for the Turkey national football team in 1931. He was also part of Turkey's squad for the football tournament at the 1936 Summer Olympics, but he did not play in any matches.
