= Kemal Faruki =

Turkish footballer (1910–1988)

Personal information
- Full name: Kemal Ahmet Faruki
- Date of birth: 27 August 1910
- Place of birth: Istanbul, Turkey
- Date of death: 27 January 1988 (aged 77)
- Position: Forward

Senior career*
Years	Team	Apps	(Gls)
1923–1934	Galatasaray SK	36	(23)

International career
1927–1928	Turkey	3	(2)
- * Club domestic league appearances and goals

Kemal Faruki (27 August 1910 – 27 January 1988) was a Turkish professional footballer. He spent the entirety of his career with his hometown club, Galatasaray SK. He also represented Turkey on two occasions. He was part of Turkey's squad at the 1928 Summer Olympics, but he did not play in any matches.

== Career ==
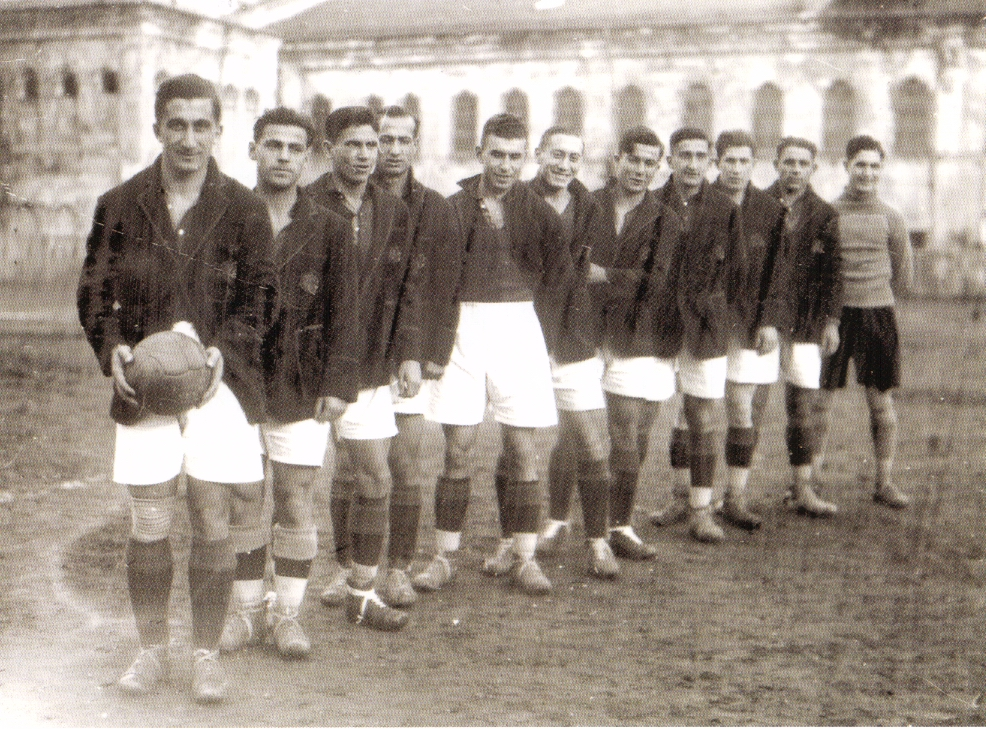
Galatasaray SK 1930–1931 Champion Team. Faruki the 6th player

Kemal Faruki was born in Istanbul, Turkey, and played his entire career as a forward and midfielder for Galatasaray SK. Faruki was selected to Galatasaray's A team when he was 17. Faruki won the Istanbul Football League five times.

He made his senior national team debut against Bulgaria on 17 July 1927. In his first international match he scored his first goal. He died in Cairo, Egypt, aged 77.

== Career statistics ==
=== International goals ===
#	Date	Venue	Opponent	Score	Result	Competition
1.	17 July 1927	Slavia Stadium, Sofia, Bulgaria	Bulgaria	3–2	3–3	Friendly
2.	15 April 1928	Stadionul Gloria-CFR, Bistrița, Romania	Romania	2–1	4–2	Friendly
Correct as of 3 May 2013

== Honours ==
=== As player ===
Galatasaray

- Istanbul Football League: 1924–25, 1925–26, 1926–27, 1928–29, 1930–31
- Istanbul Kupası: 1933

== See also ==
- List of one-club men
