= Burhan Atak =

Turkish footballer

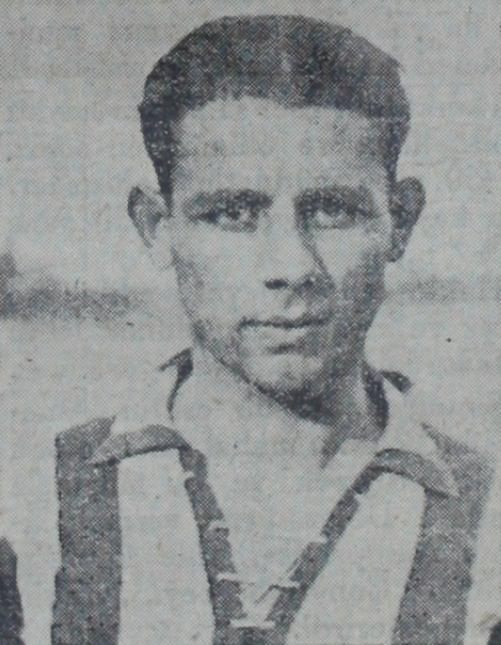

Personal information
- Date of birth: 27 January 1905
- Place of birth: Istanbul, Ottoman Empire
- Date of death: 6 June 1987 (aged 82)
- Place of death: Istanbul, Turkey
- Position: Defender

Senior career*
Years	Team	Apps	(Gls)
1920–1934	Galatasaray SK	54	(6)

International career
1926–1932	Turkey	10	(1)
- * Club domestic league appearances and goals

Burhan Atak (27 January 1905 – 6 June 1987) was a Turkish former football player. He spent the entirety of his career with his hometown club, Galatasaray SK. He also represented Turkey on 10 occasions, including at the 1928 Summer Olympics.

== Career ==
Atak was born in Istanbul and played his entire career as a defender for Galatasaray SK. Like many other Galatasaray SK players at that time, he was a student of the Galatasaray High School and started playing football at the Grand Cour of the Galatasaray High School.

He made his senior national team debut against Bulgaria on 12 September 1926 and scored his first and only goal against Romania on 15 April 1928.

Atak won the Istanbul Football League six times.

== Career statistics ==
=== International goals ===
#	Date	Venue	Opponent	Score	Result	Competition
1.	15 April 1928	Stadionul Romcomit, Bucharest, Romania	Romania	2–3	2–4	Friendly

== Honours ==
=== As player ===
- Galatasaray
  - Istanbul Football League (6): 1921–22, 1924–25, 1925–26, 1926–27, 1928–29, 1930–31
  - Istanbul Kupası: 1933

== See also ==
- List of one-club men
