= Nihat Bekdik =

Turkish footballer (1902–1972)

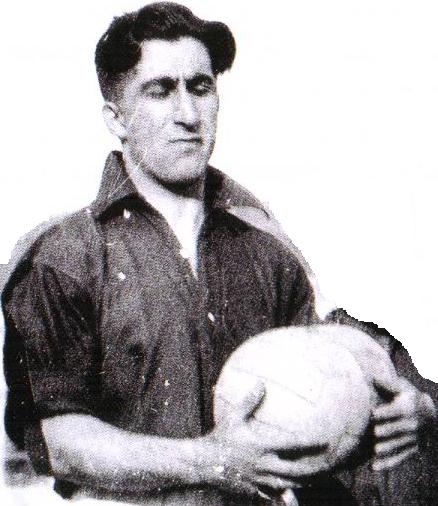

Personal information
- Full name: Nihat Asım Bekdik
- Date of birth: 1902
- Place of birth: Constantinople, Ottoman Empire
- Date of death: 21 June 1972 (aged 70)
- Place of death: Istanbul, Turkey
- Position: Centre-back

Youth career
- 1914–1916: Galatasaray SK

Senior career*
| Years | Team | Apps | (Gls) |
| 1916–1936 | Galatasaray SK | 268 | |

International career
| 1923–1932 | Turkey | 21 | (1) |

Managerial career
- 1929: Galatasaray SK
- * Club domestic league appearances and goals

"Aslan" Nihat Asım Bekdik (1902 – 21 June 1972) was a Turkish professional footballer. He spent the entirety of his career with his hometown club Galatasaray. He also represented Turkey on 21 occasions, captaining them 10 times, and played for Turkey at the 1924 Summer Olympics and the 1928 Summer Olympics.

== Sporting career ==
=== Football ===
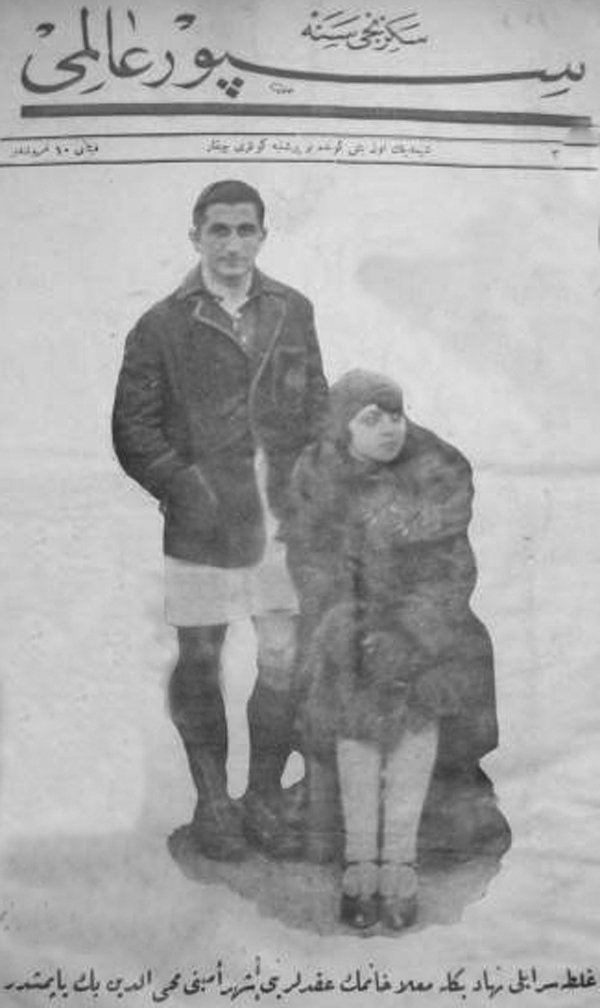
Bekdik in 1926

Nihat was born in Istanbul and played his entire career as a defense player for Galatasaray SK, playing 268 games between 1916 and 1936. Like many other Galatasaray SK players at that time, he was a student of the Galatasaray High School and started playing football at the Grand Cour of the Galatasaray High School at the age of 10. He was selected to Galatasaray A2 team when he was 12. Two years later, he started to do athletics for the next four years. He won the Istanbul Football League sixth times as captain of the team in 1928 and 1936.

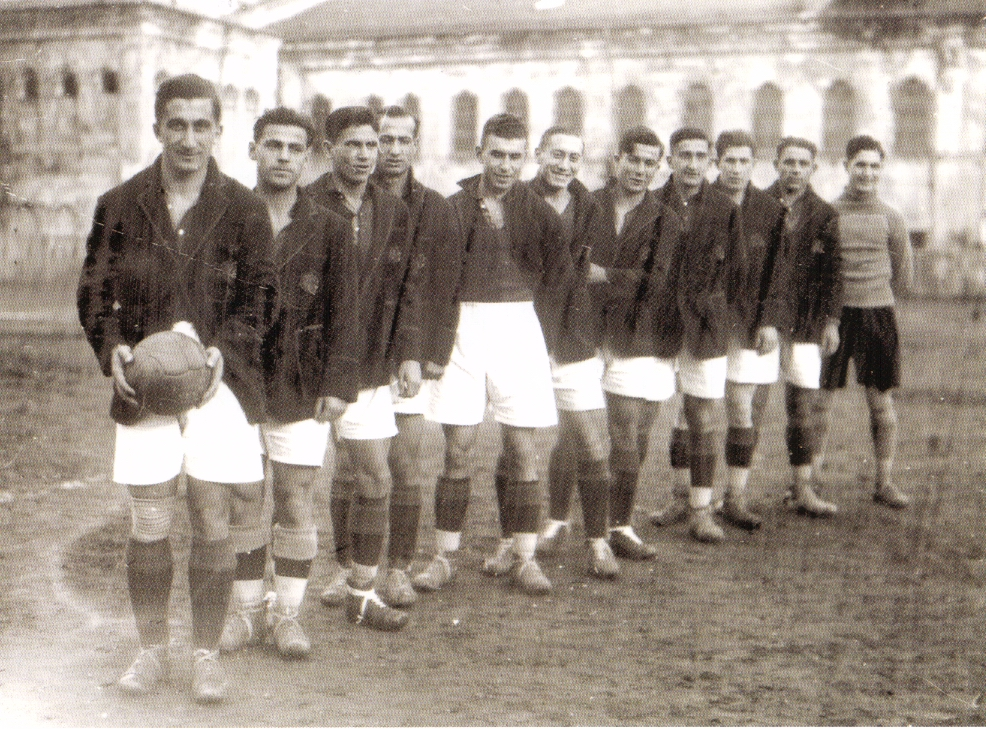
Bekdik as captain of the Galatasaray 1930–1931 champion team

=== Other sports ===
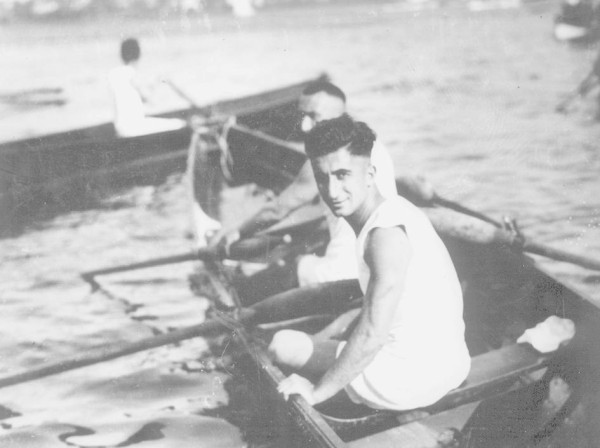
Bekdik during the Istanbul Rowing Championship, August 1933

Bekdik was also a very good triple jumper and high jumper. In 1923, he set new Turkish records at triple jump (11.92m) and high jump (1.58m). After his football career, he continued doing sports in equestrian, rowing and swimming. With his boat "Aslan", he won numerous cups.

== Political career ==
Between 1957 and 1960, Bekdik was in the Grand National Assembly of Turkey as a member of the Democratic Party.

== "Aslan" ==
Because of a lion badge at his sweat suit and his fabulous performances on the pitch, the spectators called Bekdik "Aslan", which means "lion" in Turkish. Later, "Aslan" became the nickname of the club Galatasaray SK.

== Career statistics ==
=== International goals ===
| # | Date | Venue | Opponent | Score | Result | Competition |
|---|---|---|---|---|---|---|
| 1. | 14 October 1927 | Istanbul, Turkey | Bulgaria | 3–1 | 3–1 | Friendly |

== Honours ==
=== As player ===
- Galatasaray SK
  - Istanbul Football League: 6
    - 1921–1922, 1924–1925, 1925–1926, 1926–1927, 1928–1929, 1930–1931
  - Istanbul Cup (football): 1
    - 1933

=== As manager ===
- Galatasaray SK
  - Istanbul Football League: 1
    - 1928–1929

== See also ==
- List of one-club men
