= Taksim Stadium =

Football stadium in Istanbul, Turkey

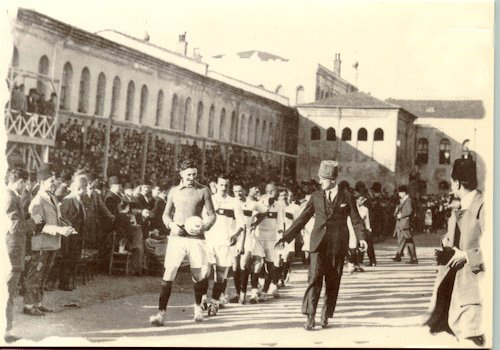
- Taksim Stadium in 1923
- Interactive map of Taksim Stadium
- Location: Taksim, Istanbul
- Coordinates: 41.0370°N 28.9851°E
- Capacity: 8,000

Construction
- Built: Taksim Military Barracks
- Opened: 1921
- Closed: 1939
- Demolished: 1940

Taksim Stadium (Turkish: Taksim Stadı) was the first football stadium in Istanbul, Turkey. Originally the 19th century Taksim Artillery Barracks (Taksim Topçu Kışlası) it was transformed into a stadium in 1921 and was located next to today's Taksim Square. The ground was the home of all major football clubs in Istanbul, including Galatasaray, Fenerbahçe and Beşiktaş. The stadium had a seating capacity of around 8,000. It was closed in 1939 and demolished in 1940, during the formation of Taksim Square. The site was converted to a public park, named the Taksim Gezi Parkı.

The first game of the Turkey national team was played at the Taksim Stadium against Romania on October 26, 1923, and ended in a 2–2 draw, with both goals of Turkey scored by Zeki Rıza Sporel.
