= 1940–41 Galatasaray S.K. season =

Galatasaray
1940–41 season
- President: (Turkey) Tevfik Ali Çınar
- Manager: (Poland) Ceslav Zaharczuk (until May 1941) (England) Bill Baggett
- Stadium: Şeref Stadı
- Istanbul Lig: 3rd
- Milli Küme: 2nd
- Top goalscorer: League: Selahattin Almay (17); All: Selahattin Almay (30)
Home colours	Away colours

The 1940–41 season was Galatasaray SK's 37th in existence and the club's 29th consecutive season in the Istanbul Football League.

== Squad statistics ==
No.	Pos.	Name	IFL		MKŞ		Total	
No.	Pos.	Name	Apps	Goals	Apps	Goals	Apps	Goals
-	GK	(Turkey) Hızır Hantal	4	0	0	0	4	0
-	GK	(Turkey) Osman İncili	13	0	10	0	23	0
-	GK	(Turkey) Saim Kaur	1	0	8	0	9	0
-	DF	(Turkey) Adnan İncirmen	9	10	16	0	25	10
-	DF	(Turkey) Salim Şatıroğlu (C)	15	2	15	8	30	10
-	DF	(Turkey) Faruk Barlas	12	0	18	0	30	0
-	MF	(Turkey) Mustafa Gençsoy	5	0	12	2	17	2
-	MF	(Turkey) İsmail Yönder	1	0	0	0	1	0
-	MF	(Turkey) Enver Arslanalp	17	0	18	1	35	1
-	MF	(Turkey) Talat Özışık	3	0	0	0	3	0
-	MF	(Turkey) Musa Sezer	18	1	18	0	36	1
-	MF	(Turkey) Halil Burnaz	9	0	11	0	20	0
-	MF	(Turkey) Arif Sevinç	3	7	6	1	9	8
-	FW	(Turkey) Turan	0	0	3	0	3	0
-	FW	(Turkey) Boduri	6	3	0	0	6	3
-	FW	(Turkey) Sarafim Madenli	13	3	0	0	13	3
-	FW	(Turkey) Eşfak Aykaç	15	5	15	11	30	16
-	FW	(Turkey) Selahattin Almay	18	17	12	13	30	30
-	FW	(Turkey) Gündüz Kılıç	13	0	0	0	13	13
-	FW	(Turkey) Sabri Gençay	0	0	0	0	0	0
-	FW	(Turkey) Mehmet Ali Gültekin	2	0	18	6	20	6
-	FW	(Turkey) Barbaros Olcayto	8	3	2	0	10	3
-	FW	(Turkey) Necdet Cici	1	0	0	0	1	0
-	FW	(Turkey) Hakkı Olaç	1	1	0	0	1	1
-	FW	(Turkey) Süleyman Tekil	1	0	0	0	1	0
-	FW	(Turkey) Recep	1	0	0	0	1	0
-	FW	(Turkey) Bülent Ediz	4	1	13	3	17	4
-	FW	(Turkey) Cemil Gürgen Erlertürk	5	2	2	0	7	2
-	FW	(Turkey) Nino Sarrafyan	0	0	1	0	1	0

== Squad changes for the 1940–1941 season ==
In:

== Competitions ==
=== Istanbul Football League ===
==== Classification ====
Pos	Team	Pld	W	D	L	GF	GA	GD	Pts
1	Beşiktaş JK	18	18	0	0	84	14	+70	54
2	Fenerbahçe SK	18	14	1	3	63	15	+48	47
3	Galatasaray SK	18	10	4	4	59	23	+36	42
4	İstanbulspor	18	8	4	6	43	47	−4	38
5	Beyoğlu SK	18	7	3	8	40	40	0	35
6	Vefa SK	18	6	4	8	39	43	−4	34
7	Beykoz 1908 S.K.D.	18	5	1	12	27	44	−17	29
8	Kasımpaşa SK	18	5	1	12	26	44	−18	29
9	Küçükçekmece SK	18	4	2	12	19	62	−43	28
10	Topkapı SK	18	1	4	13	18	86	−68	17 (Note: 7 points deducted?)

==== Matches ====
Kick-off listed in local time (EEST)

22 September 1940 1	Galatasaray SK	9–0	İstanbulspor	Istanbul
15:00	Gündüz Kılıç 7', 22', 61', 63'; Selahattin Almay 8', 52'; Boduri 57', 74'; Barbaros Olcayto 89'	(Report)		Stadium: Fenerbahçe Stadı; Referee: Ahmet Adem Göğdün

29 September 1940 2	Fenerbahçe SK	1–1	Galatasaray SK	Istanbul
15:00	Basri Taşkavak 63'	(Report)	Musa Sezer 70'	Stadium: Fenerbahçe Stadı

13 October 1940 3	Galatasaray SK	1–3	Beşiktaş JK	Istanbul
15:00	Sarafim Madenli 89'	(Report)	İbrahim Tusder 17'; Eşfak Aykaç 61' (o.g.); Şeref Görkey 74'	Stadium: Şeref Stadı; Referee: Ahmet Adem Göğdün

27 October 1940 4	Galatasaray SK	7–1	Küçükçekmece SK	Istanbul
13:00	Selahattin Almay 19', 80'; Cemil Erlertürk 35', 44'; Gündüz Kılıç 65', 83'; Boduri 66'	(Report)	Fethi Yavuzer 89' (pen.)	Stadium: Fenerbahçe Stadı; Referee: Necdet Gezen

3 November 1940 5	Topkapı SK	1–3	Galatasaray SK	Istanbul
15:00	Daver Öğüt 35'	(Report)	Hamdi Erbaydar 48' (o.g.); Sarafim Madenli 58'; Hakkı Olaç 62'	Stadium: Fenerbahçe Stadı; Referee: Samih Duransoy

17 November 1940 6	Vefa SK	1–1	Galatasaray SK	Istanbul
15:00	Fikret Dikyar 48'	(Report)	Bülent Ediz 8'	Stadium: Fenerbahçe Stadı; Referee: Feridun Kılıç

24 November 1940 7	Galatasaray SK	4–1	Kasımpaşa SK	Istanbul
13:00	Gündüz Kılıç 25', 51', 69'; Sarafim Madenli 82'	(Report)	Ali Tomaç 20'	Stadium: Fenerbahçe Stadı; Referee: Sami Açıköney

1 December 1940 8	Beykoz 1908 S.K.D.	1–3	Galatasaray SK	Istanbul
13:00	Şahap Yengingüç 28'	(Report)	Gündüz Kılıç 55', 66'; Selahattin Almay 72'	Stadium: Fenerbahçe Stadı; Referee: Ahmet Adem Göğdün

8 December 1940 9	Beyoğlu SK	1–1	Galatasaray SK	Istanbul
15:00	Yorgo Talea 49'	(Report)	Selahattin Almay 30'	Stadium: Şeref Stadı; Referee: Şazi Tezcan

22 December 1940 10	Galatasaray SK	0–2	Fenerbahçe SK	Istanbul
15:00		(Report)	Niyazi Öztunç 49', 70'	Stadium: Şeref Stadı; Referee: Şazi Tezcan

29 December 1940 11	Beşiktaş JK	5–0	Galatasaray SK	Istanbul
15:00	Şeref Görkey 35'; Şakir Uluatlı 51', 76'; Hakkı Yeten 70'; Yavuz Üreten 85' (pen.)	(Report)		Stadium: Fenerbahçe Stadı; Referee: Tarık Özerengin

5 January 1941 12	Küçükçekmece SK	1–7	Galatasaray SK	Istanbul
13:00	Abdullah Çuhacıoğlu 73'	(Report)	Arif Sevinç 10', 18', 28', 84'; Gündüz Kılıç 25'; Selahattin Almay 42', 72'	Stadium: Şeref Stadı; Referee: Şazi Tezcan

12 January 1941 13	Galatasaray SK	8–0	Topkapı SK	Istanbul
13:00	Salim Şatıroğlu 31', 53'; Selahattin Almay 34', 71', 87'; Arif Sevinç 55', 58', 73'	(Report)		Stadium: Şeref Stadı; Referee: Şekip Akduman

26 January 1941 14	Galatasaray SK	1–1	Vefa SK	Istanbul
16:00	Gündüz Kılıç 68'	(Report)	Fikret Dikyar 55'	Stadium: Şeref Stadı; Referee: Tarık Özerengin

2 February 1941 15	Kasımpaşa SK	0–5	Galatasaray SK	Istanbul
14:00		(Report)	Selahattin Almay 18' (pen.), 40'; Eşfak Aykaç 25' (pen.), 44', 85'	Stadium: Şeref Stadı; Referee: Hüsnü Savman

9 February 1941 16	Galatasaray SK	6–1	Beykoz 1908 S.K.D.	Istanbul
14:00	Selahattin Almay 1', 77' (pen.); Barbaros Olcayto 61', 72'; Eşfak Aykaç 74', 85'	(Report)	Mehmet Emin 26'	Stadium: Şeref Stadı; Referee: Muzaffer Çizer

9 February 1941 17	İstanbulspor	3–0	Galatasaray SK	Istanbul
14:00	Tarık Erer 4'; Kadir Tonba 21'; Cihat Ergün 30'	(Report)		Stadium: Şeref Stadı; Referee: Şazi Tezcan

23 February 1941 18	Galatasaray SK	2–0	Beyoğlu SK	Istanbul
16:00	Selahattin Almay 11', 49'	(Report)		Stadium: Fenerbahçe Stadı; Referee: Tarık Özerengin

=== Milli Küme ===
==== Classification ====
Pos	Team	Pld	W	D	L	GF	GA	GAv	Pts
1	Beşiktaş	18	14	4	0	51	21	2.429	50
2	Galatasaray	18	12	4	2	45	20	2.250	46
3	Fenerbahçe	18	13	2	3	51	24	2.125	46
4	Harp Okulu	18	6	4	8	33	34	0.971	34
5	Altay	18	7	1	10	28	37	0.757	33
6	İstanbulspor	18	5	3	10	34	50	0.680	31
7	Altınordu	18	5	3	10	32	56	0.571	31
8	Eskişehir Demirspor	18	4	4	10	29	39	0.744	30
9	Maskespor	18	2	8	8	32	44	0.727	30
10	Gençlerbirliği	18	5	1	12	26	36	0.722	29

Rules for classification: 3 points for a win, 2 points for a draw, and 1 points for a loss.

==== Matches ====
30 March 1941 1	Fenerbahçe SK	1–0	Galatasaray SK	Istanbul
16:15	Naci Bastoncu 38'	(Report)		Stadium: Fenerbahçe Stadı; Referee: Ahmet Adem Göğdün

13 April 1941 2	Istanbulspor	1–3	Galatasaray SK	Istanbul
15:00	Süleyman Tekil 43'	(Report)	Selahattin Almay 1'; Salim Şatıroğlu 7', 63'	Stadium: Şeref Stadı; Referee: Bülent Turanlı

19 April 1941 3	Altınordu S.K.	1–5	Galatasaray SK	İzmir
14:30	Sait 83' (pen.)	(Report)	Mehmet Ali Gültekin 20'; Selahattin Almay 36', 39', 42', 59'	Stadium: Alsancak Stadı; Referee: Ferit Simsaroğlu

20 April 1941 4	Altay SK	1–3	Galatasaray SK	İzmir
16:30	Ömer 79'	(Report)	Eşfak Aykaç 14'; Bülent Ediz 18'; Selahattin Almay 26'	Stadium: Alsancak Stadı; Referee: Esat Merter

3 May 1941 5	Harbokulu	2–5	Galatasaray SK	Ankara
16:00	Sebahattin Erman 85'; Ertuğrul 89'	(Report)	Selahattin Almay 30'; Salim Şatıroğlu 37', 42', 69'; Eşfak Aykaç 67'	Stadium: Ankara 19 Mayıs Stadium; Referee: Celal Oskay

4 May 1941 6	Maskespor	4–4	Galatasaray SK	Ankara
14:00	Celal 5'; Kenan 27'; Mehmet 48', 81'	(Report)	Arif Sevinç 23'; Salim Şatıroğlu 33', 35', 86'	Stadium: Ankara 19 Mayıs Stadium; Referee: Yusuf Aysal

11 May 1941 7	Galatasaray SK	2–3	Beşiktaş JK	Istanbul
16:45	Eşfak Aykaç 81'; Selahattin Almay 89'	(Report)	Şeref Görkey 23', 64'; İbrahim Tusder 87'	Stadium: Şeref Stadı; Referee: Samih Duransoy

17 May 1941 8	Eskişehir Demirspor	1–2	Galatasaray SK	Ankara
15:00	Murat 73'	(Report)	Enver Arslanalp 45'; Mehmet Ali Gültekin 60'	Stadium: Ankara 19 Mayıs Stadium; Referee: Halit Arpaç

18 May 1941 9	Gençlerbirliği SK	0–0	Galatasaray SK	Ankara
16:45		(Report)		Stadium: Ankara 19 Mayıs Stadium; Referee: Refik Güven

24 May 1941 10	Galatasaray SK	1–0	Gençlerbirliği SK	Istanbul
16:45	Bülent Ediz 10'	(Report)		Stadium: Şeref Stadı; Referee: Şazi Tezcan

25 May 1941 11	Galatasaray SK	3–1	Eskişehir Demirspor	Istanbul
15:00	Mehmet Ali Gültekin 18'; Eşfak Aykaç 50', 88'	(Report)	İsmail 86'	Stadium: Fenerbahçe Stadı; Referee: Samih Duransoy

1 June 1941 12	Galatasaray SK	2–1	Fenerbahçe SK	Istanbul
17:30	Selahattin Almay 13', 57'	(Report)	Fikret Kırcan 20'	Stadium: Şeref Stadı; Referee: Şazi Tezcan

15 June 1941 13	Galatasaray SK	3–2	İstanbulspor	Istanbul
15:30	Mustafa Gençsoy 8'; Mehmet Ali Gültekin 25'; Eşfak Aykaç 63'	(Report)	Tarık Erer 15'; Süleyman Tekil 42'	Stadium: Fenerbahçe Stadı; Referee: Şazi Tezcan

21 June 1941 14	Galatasaray SK	3–0	Altay SK	Istanbul
17:30	Eşfak Aykaç 21', 81'; Selahattin Almay 71'	(Report)		Stadium: Şeref Stadı; Referee: Tarık Özerengin

22 June 1941 15	Galatasaray SK	6–0	Altınordu S.K.	Istanbul
15:45	Mustafa Gençsoy 10'; Selahattin Almay 15', 28'; Eşfak Aykaç 35', 81'; Mehmet Ali Gültekin 79'	(Report)		Stadium: Fenerbahçe Stadı; Referee: Samih Duransoy

29 June 1941 16	Beşiktaş JK	1–1	Galatasaray SK	Istanbul
17:30	Hakkı Yeten 14'	(Report)	Mehmet Ali Gültekin 87'	Stadium: Fenerbahçe Stadı; Referee: Ahmet Adem Göğdün

5 July 1941 17	Galatasaray SK	1–1	Harbokulu	Istanbul
17:30	Eşfak Aykaç 69'	(Report)	Sebahattin Erman 54'	Stadium: Şeref Stadı; Referee: Şazi Tezcan

6 July 1941 18	Galatasaray SK	1–0	Maskespor	Istanbul
15:45	Bülent Ediz 64'	(Report)		Stadium: Fenerbahçe Stadı; Referee: Adnan Akın
