= 1935–36 Galatasaray S.K. season =

Sports season

Galatasaray
1935–36 season
- President: (Turkey) Ethem Menemencioğlu
- Manager: (Austria) Hans Baar
- Stadium: Taksim Stadı
- Istanbul Lig: 2nd
- Top goalscorer: League: Gündüz Kılıç (16); All: Gündüz Kılıç (16)
Home colours

The 1935–36 season was Galatasaray SK's 32nd in existence and the club's 24th consecutive season in the Istanbul Football League.

== Squad statistics ==
No.	Pos.	Name	IFL		Total	
No.	Pos.	Name	Apps	Goals	Apps	Goals
-	GK	(Turkey) Hızır Hantal	1	0	1	0
-	GK	(Turkey) Sabahattin	4	0	4	0
-	GK	(Turkey) Sacit Öget	1	0	1	0
-	GK	(Turkey) Avni Kurgan	15	0	15	0
-	DF	(Turkey) Lütfü Aksoy	19	0	19	0
-	DF	(Turkey) Salim Şatıroğlu	12	6	12	6
-	DF	(Turkey) Reşat Erkal	10	1	10	1
-	MF	(Turkey) Nihat Bekdik (C)	7	0	7	0
-	MF	(Turkey) Osman Alyanak	11	1	11	1
-	MF	(Turkey) Finlandiyali Hayrullah	6	0	6	0
-	MF	(Turkey) Hüseyin Şakir	3	0	3	0
-	MF	(Turkey) Hicri Yüce	2	0	2	0
-	MF	(Turkey) Yusuf Bahadır	1	0	1	0
-	MF	(Turkey) Suavi Atasagun	20	1	20	1
-	MF	(Turkey) Kadri Dağ	12	2	12	2
-	MF	(Turkey) Fahir Bekdik	10	0	10	0
-	MF	(Turkey) Bekir Arun	2	0	2	0
-	FW	(Turkey) Necdet Cici	16	15	16	15
-	FW	(Turkey) Fazıl Özkaptan	15	3	15	3
-	FW	(Turkey) Adnan Bindal	2	0	2	0
-	FW	(Turkey) Gündüz Kılıç	12	16	12	16
-	FW	(Turkey) Bülent Ediz	12	11	12	11
-	FW	(Turkey) Eşfak Aykaç	11	11	11	11
-	FW	(Turkey) Selahattin Buda	4	1	4	1
-	FW	(Turkey) Haşim Birkan	5	2	5	2
-	FW	(Turkey) Danyal Vuran	17	5	17	5
-	FW	(Turkey) Fethi Bey	1	1	1	1
-	FW	(Turkey) Mehmet Leblebi	1	0	1	0

== Squad changes for the 1935–36 season ==
In: Note: Flags indicate national team as defined under FIFA eligibility rules; some limited exceptions apply. Players may hold more than one non-FIFA nationality.

No.	Pos.	Nation	Player
-		TUR	Sacit Öget (from Galatasaray High School)
-		TUR	Suphi (from Galatasaray High School)
-		FIN	Hayrullah (from Galatasaray High School)
-		TUR	Fahir Bekdik (from Galatasaray High School)
-		TUR	Hicri Yüce (from Galatasaray High School)
-		TUR	Haşim Birkan (from Galatasaray High School)
-		TUR	Bülent Ediz (from Galatasaray High School)
-		TUR	Gündüz Kılıç (from Galatasaray High School)
-		TUR	Eşfak Aykaç (from Galatasaray High School)
-		TUR	Fethi Aşkın (from Galatasaray High School)
-		TUR	Reşat Erkal (from İzmirspor)
-		TUR	Sabahattin (from İzmirspor)
-		TUR	Salim Şatıroğlu (from Trabzon)

Out: Note: Flags indicate national team as defined under FIFA eligibility rules; some limited exceptions apply. Players may hold more than one non-FIFA nationality.

No.	Pos.	Nation	Player
-		TUR	Münevver Epirden (retired due to his injury)

== Competitions ==
=== Istanbul Football League ===
==== Standings ====
Pos	Team	Pld	W	D	L	GF	GA	GD	Pts
1	Fenerbahçe SK	22	21	1	0	94	10	+84	65
2	Galatasaray SK	21	17	1	3	77	25	+52	56
3	Beşiktaş JK	20	15	2	3	56	20	+36	51 (Note: 1 point deducted?)
4	Beykoz 1908 S.K.D.	21	9	5	7	31	44	−13	44
5	Güneş SK	21	10	3	8	33	31	+2	43 (Note: 1 point deducted?)
6	İstanbulspor	22	6	9	7	38	39	−1	43
7	Üsküdar Anadolu SK	22	8	4	10	28	53	−25	42
8	Vefa SK	21	7	4	10	43	39	+4	39
9	Küçükçekmece SK	22	5	6	11	33	51	−18	35 (Note: 3 points deducted?)
10	Eyüpspor	25	5	6	14	26	63	−37	35 (Note: Incorrect number of matches? 6 points deducted?)
11	Topkapı SK	22	3	2	17	31	76	−45	30
12	Hilal SK	22	2	2	18	19	58	−39	28

==== Matches ====
Kick-off listed in local time (EEST)

17 November 1935 1	Galatasaray SK	10–1	Küçükçekmece SK	Istanbul
14:30	Gündüz Kılıç 6', 20', 57', 67', 81'; Fazıl Özkaptan 21', 63'; Necdet Cici 49' (pen.), 61'; Kadri Dağ 60'	(Report)	Rauf Günsan 5'	Stadium: Taksim Stadı; Referee: Halit Galip Ezgü

24 November 1935 2	İstanbulspor	0–0	Galatasaray SK	Istanbul
		(Report)		Stadium: Taksim Stadı; Referee: Nuri Bosut

1 December 1935 3	Galatasaray SK	6–2	Güneş SK	Istanbul
14:30	Osman Alyanak 19'p Salim Şatıroğlu 30', 61'; Danyal Vuran 42'; Gündüz Kılıç 49', 65'	Ayvalı Maç (Report)	Necdet Türel 63'p Melih Kotanca 79'	Stadium: Taksim Stadı; Referee: Nuri Bosut

15 December 1935 4	Galatasaray SK	5–0	Üsküdar Anadolu SK	Istanbul
14:30	Gündüz Kılıç 40'; Danyal Vuran 47'; Selahattin Buda 54'; Suavi Atasagun 57'; Fazıl Özkaptan 78'	(Report)		Stadium: Taksim Stadı; Referee: Sabih Arca

22 December 1935 5	Beykoz 1908 S.K.D.	0–2	Galatasaray SK	Istanbul
		(Report)	Suavi Atasagun 80'p Salim Şatıroğlu 88'	Stadium: Taksim Stadı; Referee: Adnan Akın

29 December 1935 6	Galatasaray SK	2–1	Vefa SK	Istanbul
14:30	Gündüz Kılıç 40'; Bülent Ediz 51'	(Report)	Selahattin Pural 72'	Stadium: Taksim Stadı; Referee: Kemal Halim Gürgen

12 January 1936 7	Hilal SK	1–5	Galatasaray SK	Istanbul
12:45	Mehmet Salim 5'	(Report)	Necdet Cici 39'p Eşfak Aykaç 57', 82'; Salim Şatıroğlu 64', 70'	Stadium: Taksim Stadı; Referee: Adnan Akın

19 January 1936 8	Galatasaray SK	7–2	Eyüpspor	Istanbul
	Bülent Ediz 54'; Danyal Vuran 57'; Eşfak Aykaç 65', 80'; Necdet Cici 69' (pen.), 72' (pen.), 83' (pen.)	(Report)	Mehmet (Küçük) 60'; Şükrü Tuğcu 89'p	Stadium: Taksim Stadı; Referee: Kemal Halim Gürgen

26 January 1936 9	Beşiktaş JK	3–2	Galatasaray SK	Istanbul
	Eşref Bilgiç 21', 83'; Şeref Görkey 35'	(Report)	Gündüz Kılıç 2'; Danyal Vuran 68'	Stadium: Şeref Stadı; Referee: Kemal Halim Gürgen

2 February 1936 10	Galatasaray SK	4–1	Topkapı SK	Istanbul
	Bülent Ediz 3', 22'; Necdet Cici 80'; Salim Şatıroğlu 86'	(Report)	Kamil Girgin 40'	Stadium: Taksim Stadı; Referee: Halit Galip Ezgü

23 February 1936 11	Fenerbahçe SK	6–1	Galatasaray SK	Istanbul
	Naci Bastoncu 5'; Şaban Topkanlı 14', 83'; Niyazi Sel 45'; Ali Rıza Tansı 61'; Esat Kaner 68'	(Report)	Necdet Cici 29'p	Stadium: Fenerbahçe Stadı; Referee: Şazi Tezcan

15 March 1936 12	Galatasaray SK	3–0	Hilal SK	Istanbul
	Eşfak Aykaç 23'; Bülent Ediz 71'; Fethi Bey 78'	(Report)		Stadium: Taksim Stadı; Referee: Halit Galip Ezgü

22 March 1936 13	Topkapı SK	1–2	Galatasaray SK	Istanbul
	Selahattin Kapsal 13'	(Report)	Bülent Ediz 19'; Eşfak Aykaç 80'	Stadium: Taksim Stadı; Referee: Kemal Halim Gürgen

29 March 1936 14	Eyüpspor	0–5	Galatasaray SK	Istanbul
		(Report)	Eşfak Aykaç 22'; Bülent Ediz 53', 86'; Necdet Cici 58' (pen.), 71'	Stadium: Taksim Stadı; Referee: Adnan Akın

5 April 1936 15	Galatasaray SK	5–1	İstanbulspor	Istanbul
	Eşfak Aykaç 33'; Bülent Ediz 65'; Necdet Cici 70'; Reşat Erkal 74'p Danyal Vuran 87'	(Report)	İsmail Paksoy 18'	Stadium: Taksim Stadı; Referee: Ahmet Adem Göğdün

12 April 1936 16	Üsküdar Anadolu SK	3–4	Galatasaray SK	Istanbul
	Zeki Aykanat 41'; Namık 63'; Liva 81'	(Report)	Bülent Ediz 12'; Necdet Cici 36'p Eşfak Aykaç 44'; Kadri Dağ 72'	Stadium: Taksim Stadı; Referee: Şazi Tezcan

19 April 1936 17	Galatasaray SK	0–1	Fenerbahçe SK	Istanbul
		(Report)	Ali Rıza Tansı 26'	Stadium: Taksim Stadı; Referee: Ahmet Adem Göğdün

10 May 1936 18	Galatasaray SK	5–0	Beykoz 1908 S.K.D.	Istanbul
	Haşim Birkan 32'; Gündüz Kılıç 41', 83'; Necdet Cici 57'; Eşfak Aykaç 75'	(Report)		Stadium: Taksim Stadı; Referee: Cafer Çağatay

17 May 1936 19	Küçükçekmece SK	1–4	Galatasaray SK	Istanbul
	Ali Kumsal 63'	(Report)	Gündüz Kılıç 15'; Eşfak Aykaç 28'; Necdet Cici 42' (pen.), 76'	Stadium: Taksim Stadı; Referee: Şazi Tezcan

14 June 1936 20	Vefa SK	0–3	Galatasaray SK	Istanbul
		(Report)	Haşim Birkan 44'; Bülent Ediz 66'; Gündüz Kılıç 71'	Stadium: Taksim Stadı; Referee: Şazi Tezcan

21 June 1936 21	Galatasaray SK	2–1	Beşiktaş JK	Istanbul
	Gündüz Kılıç 57', 59'	(Report)	Hüsnü Savman 80'	Stadium: Taksim Stadı; Referee: Nuri Bosut

=== Friendly Matches ===
3 November 1935 1	Galatasaray SK	7–2	Panathinaikos / Apollon Smyrnis mixed	Istanbul
	Necdet Cici 20' (pen.), 35', 68' (pen.); Gündüz Kılıç 52', 65'; Danyal Vuran 60'; Adnan Bindal 80'	[First Half 2-1(Report)]	? 10' ? 54'	Stadium: Taksim Stadı; Referee: Sadri from Beşiktaş JK

9 November 1935 1	Galatasaray SK	0–0	FC Politehnica Timișoara	Istanbul
		[(Report)]		Stadium: Taksim Stadı

5 December 1935 1	Unirea Tricolor București	1–1	Galatasaray SK	Istanbul
		[ (Report)]		Stadium: Taksim Stadı

4 January 1936 1	Újpest FC	5–1	Galatasaray SK	Istanbul
	? 19' ? 34' ? 56' ? 72' ? 73'	[ First Half 2-1 (Report)]	Eşfak Aykaç 18'	Stadium: Taksim Stadium

5 July 1936 1	Fenerbahçe SK	2–3	Galatasaray SK	Istanbul
	Esat Kaner 59'; Naci Bastoncu 76'	[ First Half 0-3 (Report)]	Bülent Ediz 5'; Danyal Vuran 14'; Gündüz Kılıç 16'	Stadium: Şükrü Saracoğlu Stadium; Referee: Ahmed Adem
