= 1943–44 Galatasaray S.K. season =

Galatasaray
1943–44 season
- President: (Turkey) Osman Dardağan (until 1 January 1944) (Turkey) Sedat Ziya Kantoğlu
- Manager: (England) Bill Baggett
- Stadium: Şeref Stadı
- Istanbul Lig: 3rd
- Istanbul Kupası: Semi-final
- Top goalscorer: League: Bülent Eken (12); All: Bülent Eken (13)
Home colours	Away colours

The 1943–44 season was Galatasaray SK's 40th in existence and the club's 32nd consecutive season in the Istanbul Football League.

== Squad statistics ==
No.	Pos.	Name	IFL		IFK		Total	
No.	Pos.	Name	Apps	Goals	Apps	Goals	Apps	Goals
-	GK	(Turkey) Osman İncili	17	0	n/a	n/a	17	0
-	DF	(Turkey) Salim Şatıroğlu (C)	17	0	n/a	n/a	17	0
-	DF	(Turkey) Adnan İncirmen	8	0	n/a	n/a	8	0
-	DF	(Turkey) Bülent Eken	13	12	n/a	n/a	13	12
-	DF	(Turkey) Faruk Barlas	14	0	n/a	n/a	14	0
-	DF	(Turkey) Arif Sevinç	15	3	n/a	n/a	15	3
-	DF	(Turkey) İsmail Yönder	1	0	n/a	n/a	1	0
-	DF	(Turkey) Enver Arslanalp	10	0	n/a	n/a	10	0
-	MF	(Turkey) Hikmet Ebcim	15	3	n/a	n/a	15	3
-	MF	(Turkey) Kemal Öngü	2	0	n/a	n/a	2	0
-	MF	(Turkey) Mustafa Gençsoy	16	2	n/a	n/a	16	2
-	FW	(Turkey) İlyas Zorlu	2	4	n/a	n/a	2	4
-	FW	(Turkey) Eşfak Aykaç	4	2	n/a	n/a	4	2
-	FW	(Turkey) Gündüz Kılıç	11	9	n/a	n/a	11	9
-	FW	(Turkey) Cemil Gürgen Erlertürk	3	3	n/a	n/a	3	3
-	FW	(Turkey) Muzaffer Tokaç	7	6	n/a	n/a	7	6
-	FW	(Turkey) Orhan Canpolat	16	0	n/a	n/a	16	0
-	FW	(Turkey) Sabri Gençay	0	0	n/a	n/a	0	0
-	FW	(Turkey) Gazanfer Olcayto	16	6	n/a	n/a	16	6

== Squad changes for the 1943–1944 season ==
In:

== Istanbul Football League ==
=== Classification ===
Pos	Team	Pld	W	D	L	GF	GA	GD	Pts
1	Fenerbahçe SK	18	16	1	1	77	5	+72	33
2	Beşiktaş JK	18	14	3	1	87	16	+71	31
3	Galatasaray SK	18	13	0	5	50	22	+28	26
4	Vefa SK	18	8	5	5	33	24	+9	21
5	İstanbulspor	18	7	3	8	34	55	−21	17
6	Beykoz 1908 S.K.D.	18	6	4	8	28	37	−9	16
7	Kasımpaşa SK	18	7	2	9	32	61	−29	16
8	Küçükçekmece SK	18	3	3	12	29	66	−37	9
9	Anadolu Hisarı İdman Yurdu SK	18	2	4	12	24	52	−28	8
10	Davutpaşa SK	18	0	3	15	21	77	−56	3

=== Matches ===
Kick-off listed in local time (EEST)

16 September 1943 1	Galatasaray SK	9–0	Kasımpaşa SK	Istanbul
16:00	Muzaffer Tokaç 31', 71', 78', 80'; Gündüz Kılıç 53', 69', 87'; Gazanfer Olcayto 63'; Mustafa Gençsoy 67'	(Report)		Stadium: Fenerbahçe Stadı; Referee: Adnan Akın

26 September 1943 2	Galatasaray SK	2–1	Anadolu Hisarı İdman Yurdu SK	Istanbul
14:00	Cemil Gürgen Erlertürk 15', 67'	(Report)	Semih Çelikkanat 54'	Stadium: Fenerbahçe Stadı; Referee: Samih Duransoy

3 October 1943 3	Davutpaşa SK	3–5	Galatasaray SK	Istanbul
13:30	Orhan Sümbüloğlu 38', 62'; Aziz İlgün 83'	(Report)	Cemil Gürgen Erlertürk 4'; Eşfak Aykaç 7'; Gündüz Kılıç 10'; Gazanfer Olcayto 14', 29'	Stadium: Fenerbahçe Stadı; Referee: Adnan Akın

10 October 1943 4	Galatasaray SK	5–1	Beşiktaş JK	Istanbul
15:30	Gündüz Kılıç 25', 76'; Gazanfer Olcayto 27', 40'; Muzaffer Tokaç 41'	(Report)	Hakkı Yeten 43'	Stadium: Şeref Stadı; Referee: Sami Açıköney

17 October 1943 5	Galatasaray SK	5–1	İstanbulspor	Istanbul
15:30	Bülent Eken 13', 37', 67'; Hikmet Ebcim 24'; Muzaffer Tokaç 61'	(Report)	Viktor Venüs 78'	Stadium: Fenerbahçe Stadı; Referee: Mehmet Reşat Nayır

24 October 1943 6	Galatasaray SK	1–0	Vefa SK	Istanbul
15:30	Arif Sevinç 79'	(Report)		Stadium: Fenerbahçe Stadı; Referee: Şazi Tezcan

31 October 1943 7	Galatasaray SK	2–0	Beykoz 1908 S.K.D.	Istanbul
15:30	Arif Sevinç 65'; Bülent Eken 72'	(Report)		Stadium: Fenerbahçe Stadı; Referee: Tarık Özerengin

7 November 1943 8	Küçükçekmece SK	0–2	Galatasaray SK	Istanbul
11:00		(Report)	Eşfak Aykaç 31'; Bülent Eken 47'	Stadium: Fenerbahçe Stadı; Referee: Sami Açıköney

14 November 1943 9	Galatasaray SK	0–2	Fenerbahçe SK	Istanbul
15:00		(Report)	İbrahim İskeçe 64'; Naci Bastoncu 85'	Stadium: Fenerbahçe Stadı; Referee: Tarık Özerengin

5 December 1943 10	Kasımpaşa SK	1–3	Galatasaray SK	Istanbul
12:30	Hakkı Olaç 41'	(Report)	Gündüz Kılıç 13'; Hikmet Ebcim 47'; Gazanfer Olcayto 58'	Stadium: Şeref Stadı; Referee: Hüsnü Savman

12 December 1943 11	Anadolu Hisarı İdman Yurdu SK	2–3	Galatasaray SK	Istanbul
12:30	Cahit Kızılcı 37'; Semih Çelikkanat 51'	(Report)	Mustafa Gençsoy 24'; Bülent Eken 56'; Arif Sevinç 72'	Stadium: Şeref Stadı; Referee: Adnan Akın

19 December 1943 12	Galatasaray SK	4–1	Davutpaşa SK	Istanbul
12:30	Bülent Eken 8', 80'; Gündüz Kılıç 21', 38'	(Report)	Fethi Canik 13'	Stadium: Şeref Stadı; Referee: Adnan Akın

26 December 1943 13	Beşiktaş JK	2–0	Galatasaray SK	Istanbul
14:30	Şeref Görkey 63'; Şükrü Gülesin 65'	(Report)		Stadium: Şeref Stadı; Referee: Samih Duransoy

2 January 1944 14	İstanbulspor	2–1	Galatasaray SK	Istanbul
14:30	Bekir Nurcan 61'; Turhan Akra 82'	(Report)	Hikmet Ebcim 43'	Stadium: Şeref Stadı; Referee: Hüsnü Savman

23 January 1944 15	Beykoz 1908 S.K.D.	0–2	Galatasaray SK	Istanbul
15:00		(Report)	Bülent Eken 58', 73'	Stadium: Şeref Stadı; Referee: Tarık Özerengin

30 January 1944 16	Galatasaray SK	6–0	Küçükçekmece SK	Istanbul
13:00	İlyas Zorlu 2', 52', 53', 83'; Bülent Eken 31', 75'	(Report)		Stadium: Şeref Stadı; Referee: Adnan Akın

6 February 1944 17	Fenerbahçe SK	3–0	Galatasaray SK	Istanbul
	awarded 3-0	(Report)

20 February 1944 18	Vefa SK	3–0	Galatasaray SK	Istanbul
	awarded 3-0	(Report)

== Istanbul Futbol Kupası ==
=== 3rd Round ===
28 November 1943	Galatasaray SK	11–1	Haliç İdman Yurdu SK	Istanbul
	Gündüz Kılıç 4'; Gazanfer Olcayto 5', 83'; Bülent Eken 35'; Eşfak Aykaç 44'; Hikmet Ebcim 56', 61', 68', 75', 80'; Orhan Canpolat 84'	(Report)	Necati 89'	Stadium: Fenerbahçe Stadı; Referee: Müeyyed Güredin

=== 1/4 final ===
9 January 1944	Alemdar SK	0–4	Galatasaray SK	Istanbul
		(Report)	Orhan Canpolat 20', 57'; Hikmet Ebcim 65', 85'	Stadium: Şeref Stadı; Referee: Sami Açıköney

=== 1/2 final ===
27 February 1944 1st Leg	Beşiktaş JK	1–1	Galatasaray SK	Istanbul
	Dursun Birincioğlu 10'	(Report)	Arif Sevinç 59'	Stadium: Şeref Stadı

5 March 1944 1/2 Final 2nd Leg	Galatasaray SK	0–1	Beşiktaş JK	Istanbul
		(Report)	Kemal Gülçelik 35'	Stadium: Şeref Stadı
