= 1939–40 Galatasaray S.K. season =

Galatasaray
1939–40 season
- President: Nazmi Nuri Köksal (until 27 August 1939); Adnan Akıska (until 21 October 1939); Sedat Ziya Kantoğlu (until 10 May 1940); Tevfik Ali Çınar
- Manager: Hayman (until End 1939); Hans Baar (until February 1940); Ceslav Zaharczuk
- Stadium: Taksim Stadı
- Istanbul Lig: 3rd
- Milli Küme: 2nd
- Top goalscorer: League: Cemil Gürgen Erlertürk (30); All: Cemil Gürgen Erlertürk (33)
Home colours	Away colours

The 1939–40 season was Galatasaray SK's 36th in existence and the club's 28th consecutive season in the Istanbul Football League.

== Squad statistics ==
No.	Pos.	Name	IFL		MKŞ		Total	
No.	Pos.	Name	Apps	Goals	Apps	Goals	Apps	Goals
-	GK	(Turkey) Avni Kurgan	0	0	0	0	0	0
-	GK	(Turkey) Osman İncili	17	0	14	0	31	0
-	DF	(Turkey) Adnan İncirmen	15	0	10	0	25	0
-	DF	(Turkey) Salim Şatıroğlu (C)	14	6	12	3	26	9
-	DF	(Turkey) Lütfü Aksoy	0	0	1	0	1	0
-	DF	(Turkey) Faruk Barlas	16	0	14	0	30	0
-	MF	(Turkey) Musa Sezer	10	0	12	0	22	0
-	MF	(Turkey) Enver Arslanalp	17	1	14	0	31	1
-	MF	(Turkey) Celal Kibarer	16	0	6	0	22	0
-	FW	(Turkey) Nino Sarrafyan	1	1	0	0	1	1
-	FW	(Turkey) Bülent Ediz	3	1	5	1	8	2
-	FW	(Turkey) Bedii Etingü	3	0	2	0	5	0
-	FW	(Turkey) Süleyman Tekil	1	0	8	8	9	8
-	FW	(Turkey) Boduri	15	8	7	1	22	9
-	FW	(Turkey) Sarafim Madenli	16	7	7	2	23	9
-	FW	(Turkey) Eşfak Aykaç	11	6	11	3	22	9
-	FW	(Turkey) Selahattin Almay	15	14	13	6	28	20
-	FW	(Turkey) Gündüz Kılıç	1	0	13	16	14	16
-	FW	(Turkey) Sabri Gençay	0	0	0	0	0	0
-	FW	(Turkey) Cemil Gürgen Erlertürk	16	30	5	3	21	33

== Competitions ==
=== Istanbul Football League ===
==== Standings ====
Pos	Team	Pld	W	D	L	GF	GA	GD	Pts
1	Beşiktaş JK	18	15	1	2	76	20	+56	49
2	Fenerbahçe SK	18	14	2	2	77	13	+64	48
3	Galatasaray SK	18	13	2	3	78	11	+67	46
4	Vefa SK	18	11	3	4	48	26	+22	43
5	Beykoz 1908 S.K.D.	18	10	3	5	44	24	+20	41
6	İstanbulspor	18	7	1	10	36	45	−9	32 (Note: 1 point deducted)
7	Kasımpaşa SK	18	4	2	12	29	53	−24	28
8	Küçükçekmece SK	18	4	1	13	24	56	−32	27
9	Topkapı SK	18	4	0	14	20	84	−64	25 (Note: 1 point deducted)
10	Hilal SK	18	0	1	17	7	107	−100	17 (Note: 2 points deducted)

==== Matches ====
Kick-off listed in local time (EEST)

1 October 1939 1	Fenerbahçe SK	1–0	Galatasaray SK	Istanbul
15:00	Rebii Erkal 71'	(Report)		Stadium: Fenerbahçe Stadı; Referee: Şazi Tezcan

8 October 1939 2	Hilal SK	0–3	Galatasaray SK	Istanbul
			awarded 0–3	Stadium: Taksim Stadı

15 October 1939 3	Istanbulspor	3–2	Galatasaray SK	Istanbul
15:00	Cihat Ergün 25'; Süleyman 76'; Orhan 89' (pen.)	(Report)	Boduri 26'; Eşfak Aykaç 68'	Stadium: Taksim Stadı; Referee: Ahmet Adem Göğdün

22 October 1939 4	Galatasaray SK	3–2	Beykoz 1908 S.K.D.	Istanbul
15:00	Cemil Gürgen Erlertürk 9'; Selahattin Almay 60', 68'	(Report)	Turhan Güçlütürk 74'; Sarafim Madenli 41'	Stadium: Taksim Stadı; Referee: Adnan Akın

29 October 1939 5	Galatasaray SK	7–0	Vefa SK	Istanbul
15:00	Cemil Gürgen Erlertürk 6', 13', 85'; Boduri 65', 68'; Selahattin Almay 70', 79'	(Report)		Stadium: Şeref Stadı; Referee: Ahmet Adem Göğdün

5 November 1939 6	Galatasaray SK	9–0	Topkapı SK	Istanbul
15:00	Cemil Gürgen Erlertürk 6', 25', 33', 51', 78', 83'; Boduri 59' (pen.); Sarafim Madenli 67'; Nino Sarrafyan 89'	(Report)		Stadium: Fenerbahçe Stadı; Referee: Sami Açıköney

12 November 1939 7	Beşiktaş JK	1–0	Galatasaray SK	Istanbul
14:00	Hakkı Yeten 29'	(Report)		Stadium: Şeref Stadı; Referee: Necdet Gezen

19 November 1939 8	Kasımpaşa SK	1–5	Galatasaray SK	Istanbul
12:30	Hüseyin Cevizci 41'	(Report)	Eşfak Aykaç 12', 73'; Cemil Gürgen Erlertürk 44'; Sarafim Madenli 78'; Boduri 85' (pen.)	Stadium: Taksim Stadı; Referee: Necdet Gezen

26 November 1939 9	Galatasaray SK	9–0	Küçükçekmece SK	Istanbul
14:30	Cemil Gürgen Erlertürk 5', 14', 41', 52', 83', 86'; Eşfak Aykaç 26'; Enver Arslanalp 30'; Selahattin Almay 80'	(Report)		Stadium: Fenerbahçe Stadı; Referee: Adnan Akın

24 December 1939 10	Galatasaray SK	3–1	Fenerbahçe SK	Istanbul
15:00	Selahattin Almay 27'; Salim Şatıroğlu 50'; Sarafim Madenli 54'	(Report)	Musa Sezer 87' (o.g.)	Stadium: Taksim Stadı; Referee: Adnan Akın

14 January 1940 11	Beykoz 1908 S.K.D.	0–0	Galatasaray SK	Istanbul
15:00		(Report)		Stadium: Taksim Stadı; Referee: Adnan Akın

28 January 1940 12	Topkapı SK	0–6	Galatasaray SK	Istanbul
13:00		(Report)	Cemil Gürgen Erlertürk 14', 43'; Salim Şatıroğlu 18', 72'; Selahattin Almay 31'; Eşfak Aykaç 89'	Stadium: Taksim Stadı; Referee: Samih Duransoy

4 February 1940 13	Galatasaray SK	4–0	Beşiktaş JK	Istanbul
15:30	Cemil Gürgen Erlertürk 44', 46'; Sarafim Madenli 57'; Selahattin Almay 59'	(Report)		Stadium: Taksim Stadı; Referee: Adnan Akın

11 February 1940 14	Galatasaray SK	8–0	Kasımpaşa SK	Istanbul
13:30	Selahattin Almay 18', 73'; Cemil Gürgen Erlertürk 21', 61'; Boduri 28'; Sarafim Madenli 53', 71'; Bülent Ediz 76'	(Report)		Stadium: Fenerbahçe Stadı; Referee: Sami Açıköney

18 February 1940 15	Küçükçekmece SK	1–5	Galatasaray SK	Istanbul
15:30	Orhan Sümbüloğlu 81'	(Report)	Cemil Gürgen Erlertürk 20', 76'; Selahattin Almay 35'; Boduri 57'; Mehmet İşal 86' (o.g.)	Stadium: Taksim Stadı; Referee: Refik Osman Top

25 February 1940 16	Galatasaray SK	8–0	Hilal SK	Istanbul
13:30	Cemil Gürgen Erlertürk 14', 63', 66'; Selahattin Almay 27', 75', 82'; Boduri 50'; Salim Şatıroğlu 76'	(Report)		Stadium: Fenerbahçe Stadı; Referee: Ahmet Adem Göğdün

10 March 1940 17	Vefa SK	2–2	Galatasaray SK	Istanbul
16:00	Hakkı Yeniat 57', 65'	(Report)	Eşfak Aykaç 15'; Cemil Gürgen Erlertürk 35'	Stadium: Taksim Stadı; Referee: Kemal Halim Gürgen

24 March 1940 18	Galatasaray SK	3–0	Istanbulspor	Istanbul
14:00	Salim Şatıroğlu 15', 44'; Cemil Gürgen Erlertürk 52'	(Report)		Stadium: Şeref Stadı; Referee: Necdet Gezen

=== Milli Küme ===
==== Classification ====
Pos	Team	Pld	W	D	L	GF	GA	GAv	Pts
1	Fenerbahçe	14	11	2	1	49	17	2.882	38
2	Galatasaray	14	9	2	3	45	19	2.368	34
3	Muhafızgücü	14	6	2	6	35	30	1.167	28
4	Gençlerbirliği	14	7	0	7	31	27	1.148	28
5	Beşiktaş	14	5	3	6	37	40	0.925	27
6	Altay	14	4	4	6	24	42	0.571	26
7	Altınordu	14	4	1	9	23	44	0.523	23
8	Vefa	14	2	2	10	20	45	0.444	20

Rules for classification: 3 points for a win, 2 points for a draw, and 1 points for a loss.

==== Matches ====
31 March 1940 1	Galatasaray SK	1–1	Fenerbahçe SK	Istanbul
16:00	Süleyman Tekil 77'	(Report)	Fikret Kırcan 18'	Stadium: Taksim Stadı; Referee: Ahmet Adem Göğdün

6 April 1940 2	Altınordu S.K.	1–0	Galatasaray SK	İzmir
16:45	Adil Bümen 10'	(Report)		Stadium: Alsancak Stadı; Referee: Hasan Yanık

7 April 1940 3	Altay SK	5–4	Galatasaray SK	İzmir
16:45	Vahap Özaltay 66', 73', 75'; Ilyas 69', 77'	(Report)	Selahattin Almay 18'; Süleyman Tekil 32', 58'; Bülent Ediz 33'	Stadium: Alsancak Stadı; Referee: Mustafa Bayra

20 April 1940 4	Muhafızgücü	0–2	Galatasaray SK	Ankara
15:00		(Report)	Salim Şatıroğlu 41', 57'	Stadium: Ankara 19 Mayıs Stadium; Referee: İhsan (Fenerbahçe'li)

21 April 1940 5	Gençlerbirliği SK	0–1	Galatasaray SK	Ankara
15:00		(Report)	Boduri 11' (pen.)	Stadium: Ankara 19 Mayıs Stadium; Referee: Kemal (Ankara'lı)

27 April 1940 6	Galatasaray SK	4–0	Muhafızgücü	Istanbul
15:00	Selahattin Almay 18'; Gündüz Kılıç 31', 77', 83'	(Report)		Stadium: Şeref Stadı; Referee: Sami Açıköney

28 April 1940 7	Galatasaray SK	5–0	Gençlerbirliği SK	Istanbul
15:00	Gündüz Kılıç 2', 50', 82'; Halit Şahin 10' (o.g.); Selahattin Almay 15'	(Report)		Stadium: Fenerbahçe Stadı; Referee: Ahmet Adem Göğdün

25 May 1940 8	Galatasaray SK	3–0	Altınordu S.K.	Istanbul
15:00	Halim 40' (o.g.); Süleyman Tekil 61'; Salim Şatıroğlu 63'	(Report)		Stadium: Taksim Stadı; Referee: Şazi Tezcan

26 May 1940 9	Galatasaray SK	2–1	Altay SK	Istanbul
17:00	Eşfak Aykaç 23'; Gündüz Kılıç 63'	(Report)	İlyas 71'	Stadium: Taksim Stadı; Referee: Tarık Özerengin

9 June 1940 10	Fenerbahçe SK	3–2	Galatasaray SK	Istanbul
17:00	Naci Bastoncu 22', 70'; Fikret Arıcan 24'	(Report)	Selahattin Almay 26'; Sarafim Madenli 50'	Stadium: Fenerbahçe Stadı; Referee: Şazi Tezcan

16 June 1940 11	Galatasaray SK	4–4	Beşiktaş JK	Istanbul
17:00	Gündüz Kılıç 20', 51'; Sarafim Madenli 30'; Selahattin Almay 63'	(Report)	İbrahim Tusder 37', 65'; Hakkı Yeten 67' (pen.); Hayati Ozgan 84'	Stadium: Şeref Stadı; Referee: Sami Açıköney

23 June 1940 12	Galatasaray SK	3–0	Vefa SK	Istanbul
15:00	Selahattin Almay 15'; Cemil Gürgen Erlertürk 40'; Gündüz Kılıç 81'	(Report)		Stadium: Fenerbahçe Stadı; Referee: Tarık Özerengin

30 June 1940 13	Beşiktaş JK	2–9	Galatasaray SK	Istanbul
17:00	Hayati Özgar 13'; Şeref Görkey 60'	(Report)	Gündüz Kılıç 43', 58', 73', 75', 89'; Süleyman Tekil 49', 54', 77'; Cemil Gürgen Erlertürk 87'	Stadium: Şeref Stadı; Attendance: 6,000; Referee: Ahmet Adem Göğdün

7 July 1940 14	Vefa SK	2–5	Galatasaray SK	Istanbul
15:00	Mehmet Kızılgül 20'; Hakkı Yeniat (İzmirli) 42'	(Report)	Eşfak Aykaç 6', 37'; Süleyman Tekil 14'; Cemil Gürgen Erlertürk 25'; Gündüz Kılıç 55'	Stadium: Şeref Stadı; Referee: Tarık Özerengin

=== Friendly Matches ===
December 16, 1939 1	SK Jugoslavija	0–1	Galatasaray SK	Istanbul
		[ (Report)]		Stadium: Taksim Stadı

December 16, 1939 1	SK Jugoslavija	0–1	Galatasaray SK	Istanbul
		[ (Report)]		Stadium: Taksim Stadı

11 September 1940 Gece Turnuvası	Galatasaray SK	1–0	Şişli SK	Istanbul
20:30	Bülent Ediz 28'	(Report)		Stadium: Taksim Stadı; Referee: Adnan Akın

14 September 1940 Gece Turnuvası	Galatasaray SK	3–1	Beyoğlu SK	Istanbul
21:00	Cemil Gürgen Erlertürk 6', 19', 59' (pen.)	(Report)	Vassilios Messinezis 51'	Stadium: Taksim Stadı; Referee: Ahmet Adem Göğdün

January 20, 1940 1	MTK Hungária FC	2–3	Galatasaray SK	Istanbul
		[ (Report)]		Stadium: Taksim Stadı

April 13, 1940 1	Budapest Honvéd FC	1–6	Galatasaray SK	Istanbul
		[ (Report)]		Stadium: Taksim Stadı
