= 1941–42 Galatasaray S.K. season =

Galatasaray
1941–42 season
- President: (Turkey) Tevfik Ali Çınar
- Manager: (England) Bill Baggett
- Stadium: Şeref Stadı
- Istanbul Lig: 2nd
- Istanbul Kupası: Winner
- Top goalscorer: League: Mustafa Gençsoy (19); All: Mustafa Gençsoy (20)
| Home colours | Away colours |

The 1941–42 season was Galatasaray SK's 38th in existence and the club's 30th consecutive season in the Istanbul Football League.

== Squad statistics ==
| No. | Pos. | Name | IFL | | IFK | | Total | |
| No. | Pos. | Name | Apps | Goals | Apps | Goals | Apps | Goals |
|---|---|---|---|---|---|---|---|---|
| - | GK | (Turkey) Osman İncili | 16 | 0 | n/a | n/a | 16 | 0 |
| - | GK | (Turkey) Saim Kaur | 1 | 0 | n/a | n/a | 1 | 0 |
| - | DF | (Turkey) Adnan İncirmen | 2 | 0 | n/a | n/a | 2 | 0 |
| - | DF | (Turkey) Salim Şatıroğlu (C) | 17 | 3 | n/a | n/a | 17 | 3 |
| - | DF | (Turkey) Faruk Barlas | 17 | 0 | n/a | n/a | 17 | 0 |
| - | MF | (Turkey) Mustafa Gençsoy | 16 | 19 | n/a | n/a | 16 | 19 |
| - | MF | (Turkey) İsmail Yönder | 5 | 0 | n/a | n/a | 5 | 0 |
| - | MF | (Turkey) Enver Arslanalp | 11 | 2 | n/a | n/a | 11 | 2 |
| - | MF | (Turkey) Musa Sezer | 9 | 0 | n/a | n/a | 9 | 0 |
| - | MF | (Turkey) Kemal Öngü | 5 | 0 | n/a | n/a | 5 | 0 |
| - | MF | (Turkey) Halil Burnaz | 2 | 0 | n/a | n/a | 2 | 0 |
| - | MF | (Turkey) Arif Sevinç | 16 | 6 | n/a | n/a | 16 | 6 |
| - | FW | (Turkey) Hikmet Ebcim | 15 | 9 | n/a | n/a | 15 | 9 |
| - | FW | (Turkey) Eşfak Aykaç | 13 | 6 | n/a | n/a | 13 | 6 |
| - | FW | (Turkey) Selahattin Almay | 2 | 0 | n/a | n/a | 2 | 0 |
| - | FW | (Turkey) Gündüz Kılıç | 6 | 7 | n/a | n/a | 6 | 7 |
| - | FW | (Turkey) Sabri Gençay | 0 | 0 | n/a | n/a | 0 | 0 |
| - | FW | (Turkey) Mehmet Ali Gültekin | 4 | 2 | n/a | n/a | 4 | 2 |
| - | FW | (Turkey) Barbaros Olcayto | 4 | 1 | n/a | n/a | 4 | 1 |
| - | FW | (Turkey) Gazanfer Olcayto | 14 | 4 | n/a | n/a | 14 | 4 |
| - | FW | (Turkey) Cemil Gürgen Erlertürk | 12 | 9 | n/a | n/a | 12 | 9 |

== Squad changes for the 1941–1942 season ==
In:

== Competitions ==
=== Istanbul Football League ===
==== Classification ====
| Pos | Team | Pld | W | D | L | GF | GA | GD | Pts |
|---|---|---|---|---|---|---|---|---|---|
| 1 | Beşiktaş JK | 18 | 17 | 0 | 1 | 90 | 13 | +77 | 51 (Note: 1 point deducted?) |
| 2 | Galatasaray SK | 18 | 16 | 0 | 2 | 71 | 11 | +60 | 50 |
| 3 | Fenerbahçe SK | 18 | 13 | 0 | 5 | 67 | 13 | +54 | 44 |
| 4 | İstanbulspor | 18 | 11 | 1 | 6 | 35 | 30 | +5 | 41 |
| 5 | Vefa SK | 18 | 8 | 3 | 7 | 39 | 36 | +3 | 36 (Note: 1 point deducted?) |
| 6 | Kasımpaşa SK | 18 | 6 | 3 | 9 | 32 | 45 | −13 | 33 |
| 7 | Beykoz 1908 S.K.D. | 18 | 4 | 4 | 10 | 24 | 42 | −18 | 30 |
| 8 | Küçükçekmece SK | 18 | 5 | 2 | 11 | 26 | 71 | −45 | 30 |
| 9 | Taksim SK | 18 | 3 | 0 | 15 | 18 | 84 | −66 | 23 (Note: 1 point deducted?) |
| 10 | Beyoğlu SK | 18 | 0 | 1 | 17 | 13 | 70 | −57 | 17 (Note: 2 points deducted?) |

==== Matches ====
Kick-off listed in local time (EEST)

| 21 September 1941 1 | Galatasaray SK | 7–0 | Taksim SK | Istanbul |
| 14:00 | Barbaros Olcayto 11'; Mustafa Gençsoy 15', 40', 78', 84'; Arif Sevinç 74'; Eşfak Aykaç 75' | (Report) | | Stadium: Fenerbahçe Stadı; Referee: Ahmet Adem Göğdün |

| 28 September 1941 2 | Vefa SK | 0–1 | Galatasaray SK | Istanbul |
| 15:30 | | (Report) | Mehmet Ali Gültekin 64' | Stadium: Fenerbahçe Stadı; Referee: Şazi Tezcan |

| 5 October 1941 3 | Galatasaray SK | 8–0 | Beykoz 1908 S.K.D. | Istanbul |
| 14:00 | Eşfak Aykaç 15', 82'; Mehmet Ali Gültekin 36'; Salim Şatıroğlu 55', 71'; Mustafa Gençsoy 69', 79'; Hikmet Ebcim 77' | (Report) | | Stadium: Fenerbahçe Stadı; Referee: Sami Açıköney |

| 19 October 1941 4 | Beşiktaş JK | 3–2 | Galatasaray SK | Istanbul |
| 15:30 | Şükrü Gülesin 12', 34', 39' | (Report) | Mustafa Gençsoy 22', 27' | Stadium: Şeref Stadı; Referee: Şazi Tezcan |

| 26 October 1941 5 | Galatasaray SK | 2–1 | Fenerbahçe SK | Istanbul |
| 15:30 | Mustafa Gençsoy 49'; Hikmet Ebcim 67' | (Report) | Fikret Kırcan 53' | Stadium: Fenerbahçe Stadı; Referee: Ahmet Adem Göğdün |

| 2 November 1941 6 | Galatasaray SK | 9–0 | Kasımpaşa SK | Istanbul |
| 13:30 | Mustafa Gençsoy 1', 23', 67', 74'; Gazanfer Olcayto 20'; Eşfak Aykaç 35' (pen.), 65'; Cemil Gürgen Erlertürk 43'; Hikmet Ebcim 80' | (Report) | | Stadium: Şeref Stadı; Referee: Muzaffer Çizer |

| 16 November 1941 7 | Beyoğlu SK | 0–1 | Galatasaray SK | Istanbul |
| 13:00 | | (Report) | Salim Şatıroğlu 44' | Stadium: Fenerbahçe Stadı; Referee: Şekip Akduman |

| 23 November 1941 8 | Galatasaray SK | 6–0 | Küçükçekmece SK | Istanbul |
| 15:00 | Arif Sevinç 23'; Mustafa Gençsoy 38', 49'; Cemil Gürgen Erlertürk 53'; Eşfak Aykaç 63'; Hikmet Ebcim 76' | (Report) | | Stadium: Şeref Stadı; Referee: Muzaffer Çizer |

| 30 November 1941 9 | İstanbulspor | 0–3 | Galatasaray SK | Istanbul |
| 15:00 | | (Report) | Hikmet Ebcim 47'; Gazanfer Olcayto 58'; Cemil Gürgen Erlertürk 62' | Stadium: Fenerbahçe Stadı; Referee: Muzaffer Çizer |

| 8 February 1942 10 | Kasımpaşa SK | 0–3 | Galatasaray SK | Istanbul |
| | | (Report) | Hikmet Ebcim 6', 29'; Mustafa Gençsoy 69' | Stadium: Fenerbahçe Stadı; Referee: Mehmet Reşat Nayır |

| 22 February 1942 11 | Galatasaray SK | 5–0 | Beyoğlu SK | Istanbul |
| 15:30 | Gazanfer Olcayto 3'; Cemil Gürgen Erlertürk 6', 28', 85'; Mustafa Gençsoy 43' | (Report) | | Stadium: Şeref Stadı; Referee: Sami Açıköney |

| 1 March 1942 12 | Küçükçekmece SK | 1–5 | Galatasaray SK | Istanbul |
| | İbrahim Haliloğlu 61' | (Report) | Mustafa Gençsoy 14', 44'; Hikmet Ebcim 60'; Gündüz Kılıç 66', 82' | Stadium: Fenerbahçe Stadı; Referee: Adnan Akın |

| 8 March 1942 13 | Galatasaray SK | 5–1 | İstanbulspor | Istanbul |
| 16:00 | Arif Sevinç 5'; Gündüz Kılıç 11', 32', 71', 86' | (Report) | Mükerrem Güler 80' | Stadium: Şeref Stadı; Referee: Muzaffer Çizer |

| 23 March 1942 14 | Küçükçekmece SK | 0–3 | Galatasaray SK | Istanbul |
| 14:00 | | (Report) | awarded 0–3 | Stadium: Şeref Stadı |

| 29 March 1942 15 | Galatasaray SK | 5–0 | Vefa SK | Istanbul |
| 16:00 | Hikmet Ebcim 4'; Cemil Gürgen Erlertürk 27'; Gazanfer Olcayto 35'; Gündüz Kılıç 38'; Enver Arslanalp 40' | (Report) | | Stadium: Şeref Stadı; Referee: Şazi Tezcan |

| 5 April 1942 16 | Beykoz 1908 S.K.D. | 1–2 | Galatasaray SK | Istanbul |
| 16:00 | Bahadır Olcayto 24' | (Report) | Cemil Gürgen Erlertürk 43'; Arif Sevinç 64' | Stadium: Şeref Stadı; Referee: Adnan Akın |

| 12 April 1942 17 | Galatasaray SK | 2–3 | Beşiktaş JK | Istanbul |
| 16:00 | Arif Sevinç 5'; Enver Arslanalp 83' | (Report) | Sabri Gençsoy 13'; Şeref Görkey 72', 81' | Stadium: Fenerbahçe Stadı; Referee: Şazi Tezcan |

| 19 April 1942 18 | Fenerbahçe SK | 1–2 | Galatasaray SK | Istanbul |
| 16:00 | Melih Kotanca 81' | (Report) | Cemil Gürgen Erlertürk 13'; Arif Sevinç 78' | Stadium: Şeref Stadı; Referee: Adnan Akın |

=== Istanbul Futbol Kupası ===
==== Matches ====
| 1/16 Final | Galatasaray SK | 4–1 | Anadolu Hisarı İdman Yurdu SK | Istanbul |
| | | [ (Report)] | | Stadium: Şeref Stadı |

| 1/8 Final | Galatasaray SK | 11–0 | Unkapanı SK | Istanbul |
| | | [ (Report)] | | Stadium: Şeref Stadı |

| 1/4 Final | Galatasaray SK | 5–0 | Kasımpaşa SK | Istanbul |
| | | [ (Report)] | | Stadium: Şeref Stadı |

| 1/2 Final | Beşiktaş JK | 2–3 | Galatasaray SK | Istanbul |
| | ? ? | [ (Report)] | Gündüz Kılıç (?); Cemil Gürgen Erlertürk (?); Gazanfer Olcayto (?) | Stadium: Şeref Stadı |

| 15 March 1942 Final | Galatasaray SK | 6–0 | Fenerbahçe SK | Istanbul |
| | Hikmet Sarı 4', 77'; Cemil Gürgen Erlertürk 25', 62'; Gündüz Kılıç 37', 88' | (Report) | | Stadium: Şeref Stadı; Referee: Sami Açıköney |
