= 1935–36 Istanbul Football League =

Istanbul Football League
- Season: 1935–36
- Champions: Fenerbahçe SK (8th title)

The 1935–36 İstanbul Football League season was the 28th season of the league. Fenerbahçe SK won the league for the 8th time.

== Season ==
Pos	Team	Pld	W	D	L	GF	GA	GD	Pts
1	Fenerbahçe SK	22	21	1	0	94	10	+84	65
2	Galatasaray SK	21	17	1	3	77	25	+52	56
3	Beşiktaş JK	20	15	2	3	56	20	+36	51 (Note: 1 point deducted?)
4	Beykoz 1908 S.K.D.	21	9	5	7	31	44	−13	44
5	Güneş SK	21	10	3	8	33	31	+2	43 (Note: 1 point deducted?)
6	İstanbulspor	22	6	9	7	38	39	−1	43
7	Üsküdar Anadolu SK	22	8	4	10	28	53	−25	42
8	Vefa SK	21	7	4	10	43	39	+4	39
9	Küçükçekmece SK	22	5	6	11	33	51	−18	35 (Note: 3 points deducted?)
10	Eyüpspor	25	5	6	14	26	63	−37	35 (Note: Incorrect number of matches? 6 points deducted?)
11	Topkapı SK	22	3	2	17	31	76	−45	30
12	Hilal SK	22	2	2	18	19	58	−39	28
