= Subhi =

Subhi (Arabic: صبحي, romanized: Ṣubḥīy, also transliterated as Sobhi, Sobhy, or Subhy) is an Arabic masculine given name in the form of a nisba adjective meaning 'of the dawn,' 'of the morning,' or 'matutinal.' According to Almaany, the name connotes beauty: radiance of the face and sunny features.

== Given name ==
=== Sobhi ===
- Sobhi Abu Setta (1944–2001), better known as Mohammed Atef, also known as Abu Hafs al-Masri, the military chief of al-Qaeda
- Sobhi Mahmassani (1909–1986), Lebanese legal scholar, practising lawyer, judge, and political figure
- Sobhi Saïed (born 1982), Tunisian handball player
- Sobhi Sioud (born 1975), Tunisian handball player

=== Subhi ===
- Subhi Abdilah Bakir (born 1980), Bruneian footballer
- Subhi al-Badri al-Samerai (1936–2013), Iraqi muhaddith
- Subhi Bey Barakat (1889–1939) was a Syrian politician
- Subhi Saleh (born 1953), Egyptian lawyer, a prominent member of the Muslim Brotherhood
- Subhi al-Tufayli (born 1948), leader of Hezbollah
- Subhi Taha, Palestinian-Filipino activist and content creator

== Middle name ==
- Ahmed Subhy Mansour (born 1949), Egyptian American Muslim cleric, activist, founder of the Quranist movement
- Mohammed Sobhi al-Judeili (1983–2019), Palestinian paramedic who was killed by the Israeli Defense Forces (IDF)
- Taha Subhi Falaha (1977–2016), better known as Abu Mohammad al-Adnani, Syrian-born Islamic spokesman

== Surname ==
=== Sobhi ===
- Ahmed Sobhi (born 1991), Egyptian footballer
- Gorgi Sobhi (1884–1964), Egyptian medical doctor
- Khaled Sobhi (born 1995), Egyptian footballer
- Mohamed Sobhi (actor) (born 1948), Egyptian actor
- Nawaf Al-Sobhi (born 1990), Saudi Arabian football player
- Noureddine Sobhi (born 1962), Moroccan long-distance runner
- Ramadan Sobhi (born 1997), Egyptian football winger

=== Sobhy ===
- Amanda Sobhy (born 1993), American squash player
- Amr Sobhy (born 1988), Egyptian information activist, social entrepreneur, author and poet
- Mohamed Sobhy (footballer, born 1981) (born 1981), Egyptian footballer
- Mohamed Sobhy (footballer, born 1999) (born 1999), Egyptian footballer
- Sabrina Sobhy (born 1996), American squash player
- Sedki Sobhy (born 1955), Egyptian politician

=== Subhi ===
- Mohsen Subhi (1963–2009), Palestinian composer of classical music
- Mustafa Subhi or Mustafa Suphi (1883–1921), Turkish revolutionary communist militant leader

== See also ==
- Suphi
