= Dreame Technology =

Chinese appliance manufacturer

Dreame Technology Co., Ltd.
- Type: Private
- Industry: Home appliances
- Founded: 2017
- Founder: Yu Hao (CEO)
- Headquarters: Suzhou
- Area served: Worldwide
- Products: household cleaning and personal care appliances
- Website: www.dreametech.com

Dreame Technology (Chinese: 追觅科技; English pronunciation: //ˈdɹiː.mi//; referred to simply as Dreame), with the full name Dreame Technology Co., Ltd., also known as Dreametech, is a Chinese consumer electronics manufacturer founded by Yu Hao in 2017. Its main products include cordless vacuums, scrubbers, hair dryers, robotic lawn mowers, and robot vacuum cleaners and mops. The company specializes in the production of vacuum cleaners. In addition, it owns and operates an app called Dreamehome.

Outside of China, Dreame products are available in overseas markets such as Malaysia, Australia, and the US. After its establishment, the company was backed by Xiaomi, Yunfeng Capital, and Shunwei Capital. In October 2021, it raised $563 million in a Series C funding round.

== History ==
Founder Yu Hao started "Sky Workshop" a student-run aerospace makerspace at Tsinghua University in 2009. The project earned a sponsorship from Boeing, leading Yu to form Dreame in Suzhou in 2015. In December 2018, the firm launched its first product, the V9 stick vacuum in collaboration with Xiaomi. In 2019, Dreame ended its partnership with Xiaomi to release its own line of robot vacuums.

In 2020, Dreame developed a 150,000-rpm digital motor. In August, it secured an investment from IDG Capital. In December, its Suzhou smart factory started operations.

In October 2021, Dreame reached a partnership with Borussia Dortmund. The company introduced its first robot vacuum-mop in January 2022. In September 2023, it exhibited at the IFA. In 2023, it launched Mova, a lower-end sub-brand.

== Products ==
=== Automobiles ===
Dreame announced its plans of making electric vehicles in 2025; the Nebula Next 01 concept car was shown at CES 2026 alongside the Kosmera marqee. Soon after the trade show, Dreame announced its electric-powered SUV lineup, Star Motor.

In August 2026, media outlet Yicai reported that several Dreame Auto executives were actively seeking alternative employment, and a large portion of the project's workforce has been laid off. At the project's peak, the division had 700–800 employees and according to an employee the workforce had occupied ¾ of his floor in the company's office building; by the time of Yicai's visit, under ⅓ of the cubicles had not been vacated. Layoffs had started in June 2026 and reduced the employees by around 25% each wave. According to employees, only senior executives are expected to remain after the wave of layoffs beginning in August 2026. As of August 2026, the division has significant debts to pay off to several automotive suppliers.

=== Smartphones ===
In 2025, Dreame announced its smartphone line up; the first product, E1, has been registered in the European Product Registry for Energy Labelling.

=== Vacuum cleaners ===
Dreame's primary product market is vacuum cleaners. The company's first product, the V9 stick vacuum was released in December 2018 in collaboration with Xiaomi. In 2022, it released the L10S Ultra, a robot vacuum-mop.
