= Suphi =

Suphi is a Turkish name of Arabic origin (صبحي). Turkish Language Association gives its meaning as "about dawn." Notable people with the name include:

== First name ==
- Suphi Baykam (1926–1996), Turkish physician and politician
- Suphi Bereket (1889–1939), Turkish politician
- Suphi Ezgi (1869–1962), Turkish military physician
- Suphi Nuri İleri (1887–1945), Turkish politician and writer

== Middle name ==
- Hamdullah Suphi Tanrıöver (1885–1966), Turkish poet and politician
- Mehmet Suphi Kula (1881–1948), Turkish military officer
- Mustafa Suphi (1883–1921), Turkish communist leader

== See also ==
- Sobhi
