= Vahap Özaltay =

Turkish footballer (died 1965)

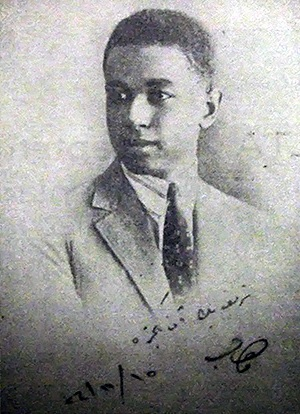

Personal information
- Date of birth: 1907 or 1908 or 1909
- Place of birth: Istanbul, Ottoman Empire or İzmir, Ottoman Empire or Beirut, Ottoman Empire (today Lebanon)
- Date of death: 10 June 1965
- Place of death: İzmir, Turkey
- Positions: Midfielder; forward

Youth career
- 1921–1922: Kastamonu Sultânisi
- 1922–1923: Altay S.K.

Senior career*
Years	Team	Apps	(Gls)
1923–1931	Altay S.K.		
1932–1934	Racing Club de France		
1934–1936	Altay S.K.		
1936–1937	Racing Club de France		
1937	Şişli Spor Kulübü		
1937–1940	Altay S.K.		

International career
1932	Turkey	1	(0)

Managerial career
- 1937: Şişli Spor Kulübü (Player-coach)
- 1954: Turkey national army football team
- * Club domestic league appearances and goals

Vahap Özaltay or Vehâb Özaltay (born, Beşir oğlu Vahap; in 1907, 1908 or 1909 – 10 June 1965) was a Turkish international footballer and track and field athlete.

He is notable for being the first Turkish player to ever play for a foreign club, when he signed for Racing Club de France in 1932, and for his three stints with Altay S.K. with whom, in 1937, he became the first professional footballer in Turkey. He chose his last name based on his love for Altay (lit. "Pure/Real Altay").

Özaltay was born in 1908 in Beirut. He was the son of a civil servant. When he was 10 years old, his family moved to Aydın. Shortly after the Greek Occupation of İzmir on 21 May 1919, his family moved to Kastamonu. He started his football career in Kastamonu.

== Career ==
=== Club career ===
After the Greek presence ended on 8 September 1922, his family moved to İzmir. He was 14 years old when he started playing for Altay. He started playing in the main squad for Altay beginning in 1922. Altay was the leading Turkish football Club in İzmir. He won İzmir League with Altay on 5 occasions (1923–24, 1924–25, 1927–28, 1928–29, 1930–31).

Özaltay was transferred to the French club Racing Club de Paris in 1932, becoming the first Turkish player to do so. He played in France for 5 seasons for Racing Club. Due to his head-made goals, he was nicknamed "Le Tête de Turc" in France.

In 1937 he returned to Turkey and played for Altay again, this time as a professional footballer. He was the first Turkish player ever to be given a professional football player certificate by the Turkish State.

=== International career ===
Özaltay represented Turkey at senior level once, against Bulgaria in a friendly game, held at Taksim Stadium, Istanbul, on 4 November 1932, ended 3–2 for Bulgaria.

=== Coaching career ===
After his football career, he worked as a manager for Altay and for the national team of the military. He became famous as being the first manager to use the WM formation. With the national team he won the World Army Football tournament of 1954.

== Personal life ==
Özaltay was married with 7 children. His younger brother, Saim, also played for Altay S.K. Although the rivalry between their clubs, Özaltay and Said Altınordu, Altınordu F.K. icon were best friends. Özaltay died due to a heart attack following his given speech at generalassembly of Altay S.K., on 10 June 1965.
