= Bill Baggett =

English footballer (1902–1978)

Personal information
- Full name: Walter John Baggett
- Date of birth: 29 May 1902
- Place of birth: Potterspury, England
- Date of death: 1978 (aged 75–76)
- Position: Inside forward

Senior career*
Years	Team	Apps	(Gls)
1921–1922	Victoria Ironworks		
1922–1923	Wolverhampton Wanderers	0	(0)
1923–1927	Bolton Wanderers	24	(10)
1927–1930	Reading	46	(13)
1930	Colwyn Bay United		
1930–1932	Reading	31	(8)
1932	Tunbridge Wells Rangers		

Managerial career
- 1938: Greece
- 1941–1945: Galatasaray
- 1945–1947: Panionios
- * Club domestic league appearances and goals

Walter John Baggett (29 May 1902 – 21 July 1978) was an English footballer who played as an inside forward in the Football League for Bolton Wanderers and Reading.

== Managerial career ==
On 25 March 1938, Baggett managed Greece for a single 1938 FIFA World Cup qualification game against Hungary. Greece lost 11–1 in Budapest, a record defeat for the country that still stands to this day. Three days later, Baggett was in charge for an unofficial friendly against a mixed team from Kispest and Szeged in Hungary, resulting in a 2–1 win for Greece.

Following the German invasion of Greece in 1941, Baggett fled the country, settling in Turkey. In the same year, Baggett was appointed manager of Galatasaray. Begget stayed at Galatasaray until 1945. Under Begget's stewardship, Galatasaray won two Istanbul Football Cups.

In December 1945, Baggett was appointed manager of Greek club Panionios. In 1947, Baggett left Panionios to return to England, being replaced as manager by Georgios Roussopoulos.
