= İbrahim Tusder =

Turkish footballer

Personal information
- Date of birth: 15 January 1915
- Place of birth: Istanbul, Turkey
- Date of death: 9 July 2001 (aged 86)

International career
Years	Team	Apps	(Gls)
- Turkey

İbrahim Tusder (15 January 1915 – 9 July 2001) was a Turkish footballer. He competed in the men's tournament at the 1936 Summer Olympics.
