= Hüsnü Savman =

Turkish footballer

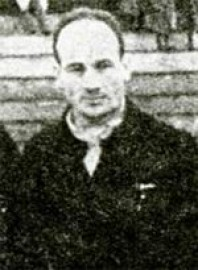

Personal information
- Date of birth: 18 August 1908
- Place of birth: Gönen, Turkey
- Date of death: 8 August 1948 (aged 39)

International career
Years	Team	Apps	(Gls)
- Turkey

Hüsnü Savman (18 August 1908 – 8 August 1948) was a Turkish footballer. He competed in the men's tournament at the 1936 Summer Olympics.
