= Faruk Barlas =

Turkish footballer

Personal information
- Date of birth: 12 April 1915
- Place of birth: Istanbul, Turkey
- Date of death: 9 January 1994 (aged 78)
- Place of death: Istanbul, Turkey
- Position: Defender

International career
Years	Team	Apps	(Gls)
1937	Turkey	1	(0)

Faruk Barlas (12 April 1915 – 9 January 1994) was a Turkish footballer. He played in one match for the Turkey national football team in 1937. He was also part of Turkey's squad for the football tournament at the 1936 Summer Olympics, but he did not play in any matches.
