= Eşfak Aykaç =

Turkish footballer (1918–2003)

Personal information
- Date of birth: 1918
- Place of birth: Kınalıada, Istanbul, Ottoman Empire
- Date of death: 21 November 2003 (aged 85)
- Place of death: Istanbul, Turkey

Senior career*
Years	Team	Apps	(Gls)
1936–1946	Galatasaray	131	(56)

Managerial career
- 1961–1962: Beykoz 1908 S.K.D.
- 1963–1965: Feriköy
- 1966–1967: Feriköy
- 1967–1968: Galatasaray
- 1968–1969: Altınordu
- * Club domestic league appearances and goals

Eşfak Aykaç (1918–2003) was a Turkish football player and coach. He only played for Galatasaray (1936–1946) and after his career he coached the club.

He was named coach of the Turkey national team for one match, against Hungary's Golden Team, which he won 3–1.

== See also ==
- List of one-club men
