= Şazi Tezcan =

Turkish football player and referee

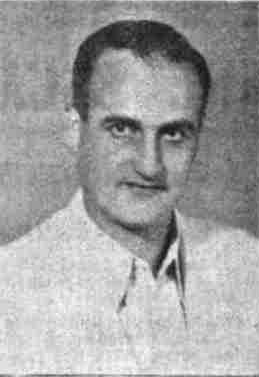
- Tezcan in 1947

Personal information
- Full name: Şazi Tezcan
- Date of birth: 1907
- Place of birth: Constantinople, Ottoman Empire
- Date of death: 1962 (aged 54–55)
- Place of death: Turkey
- Position: Goalkeeper

Senior career*
Years	Team	Apps	(Gls)
- Kasımpaşa
- Darüşşafaka
- Beykoz
Refereeing career
- Other occupation: Physical education teacher
International
Years	League	Role
1948	FIFA listed	Referee
- * Club domestic league appearances and goals

Şazi Tezcan (1907–1962) was a Turkish football player and referee. He became Turkey's first referee to officiate an international match, and became a FIFA referee in 1948.

== Playing career ==
Born in 1907 in Constantinople (modern-day Istanbul), Tezcan played as a goalkeeper for Kasımpaşa, Darüşşafaka, and Beykoz. He was also a physical education teacher at the Commercial High School. In 1928 Tezcan broke his arm, and was unable to continue playing football and working as a teacher.

== Refereeing career ==
In 1932, Tezcan attended the Turkish Football Federation's first training courses for referees, obtaining his diploma and starting his refereeing career. On 28 November 1937, Tezcan officiated a match at the Taksim Stadium between Fenerbahçe and Greek side AEK, which ended in a 3–2 win for AEK. Tezcan expelled Esad'ı of Fenerbahçe, despite yellow and red cards not existing at the time; the referee was punished with a lifetime ban. The Istanbul District Disciplinary Board overturned the decision on 5 March 1938.

On 1 October 1940, a new law was enacted in Turkey where referees were officially licensed: Tezcan was given the first "national referee" license. On 4 May 1947, Tezcan refereed an international game between Lebanon and Syria at the Beirut Municipal Stadium, becoming the first Turkish referee to officiate a match between two international sides. He became a FIFA referee in 1948, earning the FIFA badge.

== Death ==
Tezcan died in 1962.
