= Galatasaray S.K. (football) =

Turkish professional football club

Galatasaray
- Full name: Galatasaray Spor Kulübü
- Nicknames: Aslanlar (The Lions); Sarı-Kırmızılılar (The Yellow-Reds); Cimbom; Gala
- Founded: 1 October 1905; 121 years ago
- Stadium: Rams Park
- Capacity: 53,387
- Coordinates: 41°06′10″N 28°59′26″E
- President: Dursun Özbek
- Head coach: Okan Buruk
- League: Süper Lig
- 2025–26: Süper Lig, 1st of 18 (champions)
- Website: www.galatasaray.org
Home colours	Away colours	Third colours

Galatasaray Spor Kulübü (Galatasaray Sports Club), usually referred to as Galatasaray (recognized as Galatasaray A.Ş. by TFF and UEFA), is a Turkish professional football club based in Istanbul. It is the association football branch of the larger Galatasaray Sports Club of the same name, itself a part of the Galatasaray Community Cooperation Committee which includes Galatasaray High School, where the football club was founded in 1905, consisting entirely of students. The team plays in dark shades of red and yellow at home, with the shirts split down the middle between the two colours.

Galatasaray is one of three teams to have participated in all seasons of the Süper Lig since 1959, following the dissolution of the Istanbul Football League. Galatasaray has the most Süper Lig (26), Turkish Cup (19) and Turkish Super Cup (17) titles in Turkey. Galatasaray is the most successful Turkish club in European competitions. Galatasaray won the UEFA Cup and UEFA Super Cup in 2000, becoming the only Turkish team to win a major UEFA competition. In the 1999–2000 season, the club achieved the rare feat of completing a treble by winning the Süper Lig, Turkish Cup, and UEFA Cup in a single season. In the UEFA Champions League, Galatasaray has reached the quarter-finals several times and the semi-finals of Club Champions Cup once. Galatasaray is the only Turkish club to have been ranked first on the IFFHS World Rankings. According to IFFHS, Galatasaray is the most successful Turkish club of the 20th century, and the 20th most successful club in Europe. As of 2026, they are 2nd in the UEFA coefficient rankings among Turkish teams.

Since 2011, the club's stadium has been the 53,387-capacity Rams Park in the Seyrantepe district of Istanbul. Previously, the club played at the Ali Sami Yen Stadium, as well as a succession of other stadium in Istanbul, which included stadium shares with Beşiktaş and Fenerbahçe at the Taksim Stadium and İnönü Stadium.

The club has a long-standing rivalry with other Istanbul teams, namely Beşiktaş and Fenerbahçe. The derby between Galatasaray and Fenerbahçe is dubbed the Kıtalar Arası Derbi (English: Intercontinental Derby) due to the location of their stadiums on the European (Galatasaray) and Asian (Fenerbahçe) sides of the Bosphorus strait.

== History ==
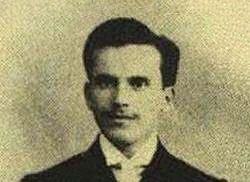
Ali Sami Yen, founder of the club

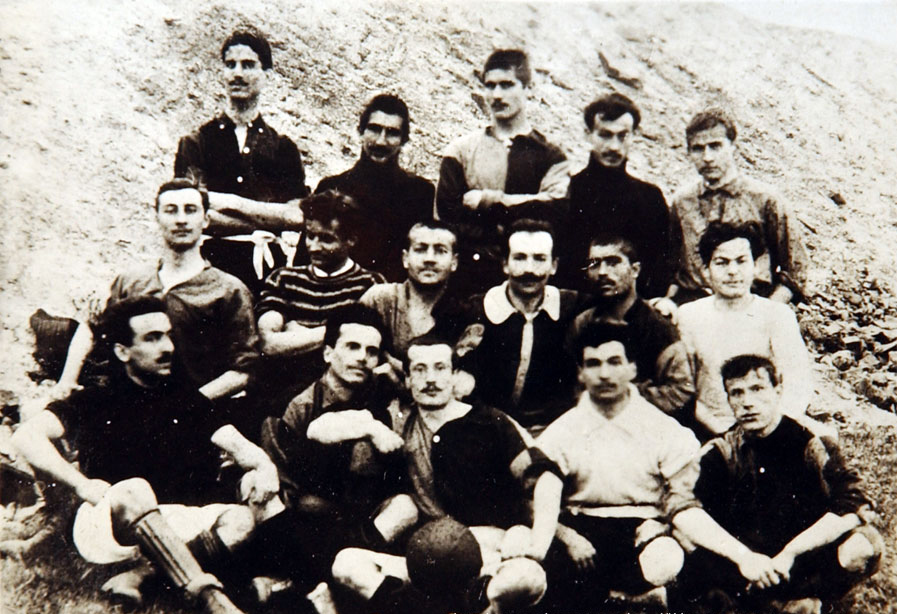
The first recorded photo of Galatasaray (1905)

Galatasaray SK was founded in October 1905 (the exact day is disputed, but is traditionally accepted as "30 October 1905" according to the Gregorian calendar) by Ali Sami Yen and other students of Galatasaray High School (a high school in Istanbul which was established in 1481) as a football club. Ali Sami Yen became Galatasaray SK's first president and was given the club's membership number "1". The team's first match was against Cadi-Keuy FC and Galatasaray won this match with a score of 2–0. There were discussions about the club's name, in which some suggested Gloria (victory) and others Audace (courage), but it was decided that its name would be Galatasaray.

In addition to Ali Sami Yen (Club member No. 1), who was the driving force behind the club's foundation, Asim Tevfik Sonumut (2), Emin Bülent Serdaroğlu (3), Celal İbrahim (4), Boris Nikolov (5), Milo Bakić (6), Pavle Bakić (7), Bekir Sıtkı Bircan (8), Tahsin Nihat (9), Reşat Şirvanizade (10), Hüseyin Hüsnü (11), Refik Cevdet Kalpakçıoğlu (12) and Abidin Daver (13) were also involved in the decision to organize such a club.

Our aim is to play together, like the Englishmen, to have a colour and a name, and to beat the non-Turkish teams.

— Ali Sami Yen

The name Galatasaray itself comes from that of Galatasaray High School, which in turn takes its name from Galata Sarayı Enderûn-u Hümâyûn (Galata Palace Imperial School), the name of the original school founded on the site in 1481, and which in turn took its name from the nearby medieval Genoese citadel of Galata (the modern quarter of Karaköy) in the Beyoğlu (Pera) district of Istanbul. Galatasaray literally means "Galata palace".

According to researcher Cem Atabeyoğlu, Galatasaray took its name from one of its first matches. In that match, Galatasaray won 2–0 over a local Greek club, and the spectators called them "Galata Sarayı efendileri" (English: "Gentlemen of Galata Palace"), and, after this incident, they adopted that name and started to call their club "Galata Sarayı". In 1905, during the era of the Ottoman Empire, there were no laws for associations so the club could not be registered officially, but, after the 1912 Law of Association, the club registered legally.

Since there weren't any other Turkish teams, Galatasaray joined the Istanbul League that was consisting of English and Greek teams in the season of 1905–1906. With their first championship title they won in 1908–1909, they heralded the beginning of Turkish football history.

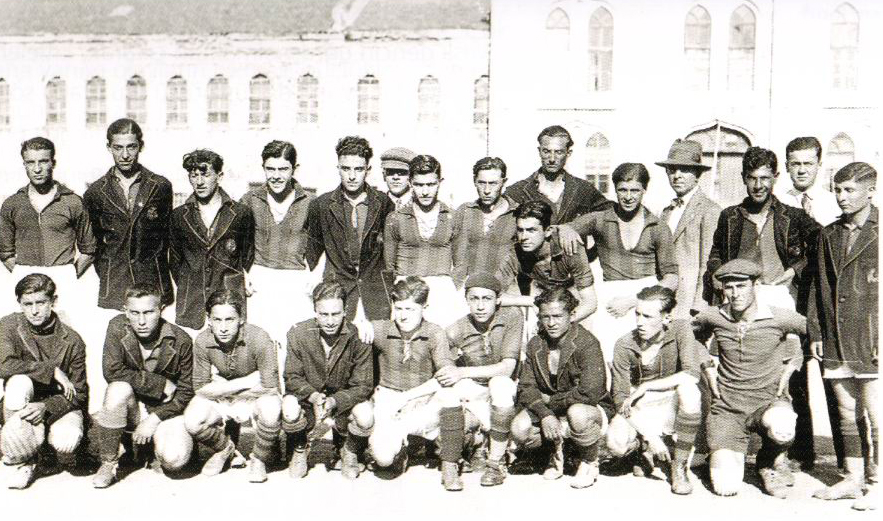
Galatasaray S.K. and Fenerbahçe S.K. in 1924

While football in Turkey began to fully develop, Galatasaray won ten more Istanbul League titles until 1952. Upon the initiation of professional football in 1952, the first professional but non-national league of Turkey, Istanbul Professional League, was played between 1952 and 1959. Galatasaray won three of these seven titles.

Türkiye Profesyonel 1. Ligi (Turkish Super League today) formed in 1959. This is the top-flight professional league in Turkish nationwide football, and the most popular sporting competition in the country. Galatasaray joined all seasons and won 25 league titles since then.

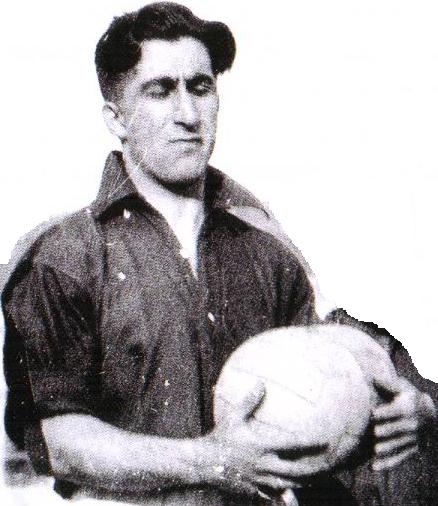
Nihat Bekdik

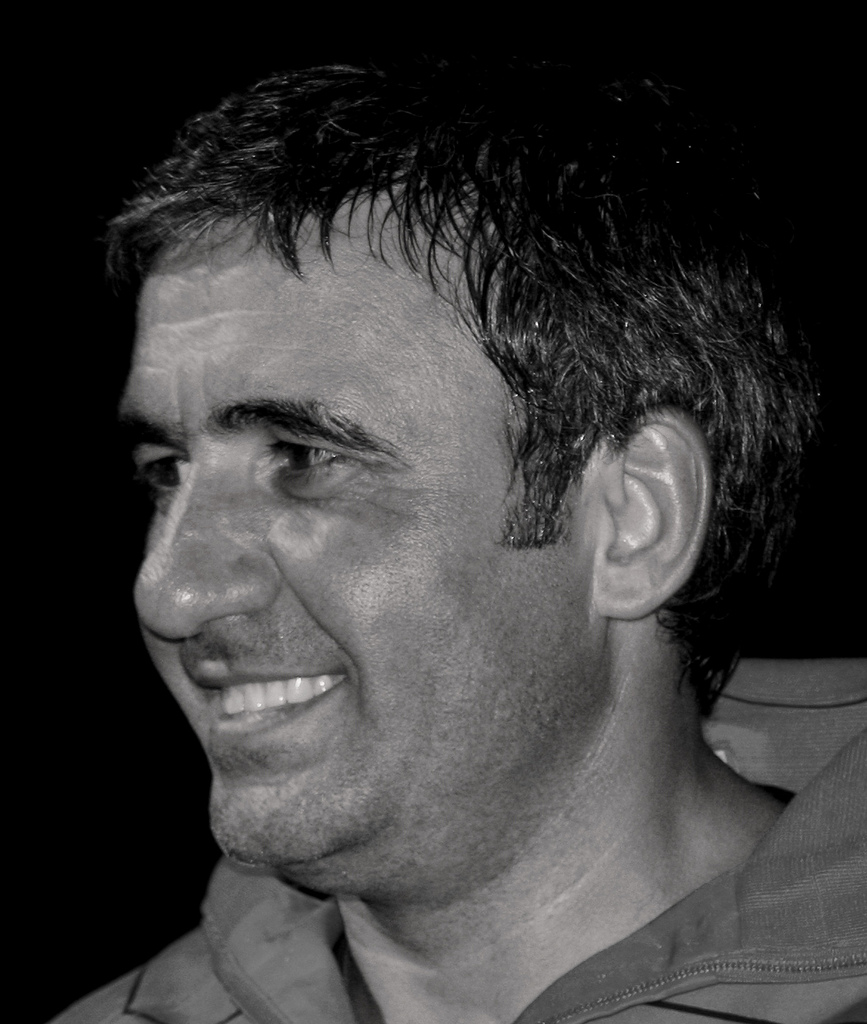
Gheorghe Hagi

The Turkish Football Federation began organizing the Turkish Cup in the 1962–63 season for Turkish clubs to qualify for the UEFA competitions. This is the only national cup competition in Turkey. Galatasaray joined all seasons and won 16 trophies since then.

Historically, one of the clubs biggest achievements came in the 1986–1987 season where they won national championships in 15 different sport branches. Another achievement in this period was reaching the semi-final of the Champions League in the 1988–89 season making Galatasaray the first and only Turkish team to have played a semi-final in this competition.

Galatasaray's most successful era came in the late 1990s, when the club become the first and only Turkish football club to win a major UEFA competition with 1999–2000 UEFA Cup. They were aided in this by one of Turkey's best generation of homegrown footballers who went on to finish third in the 2002 FIFA World Cup, after having played in the quarter-finals of UEFA Euro 2000. Besides the talented local players, the home stadium of Ali Sami Yen Stadium created a huge advantage, as it was literally dubbed "Hell" by media and the visitors due to the intimidating atmosphere provided by the fans including chants and riots in the crowds.

There are many successful footballers who have played for Galatasaray and made their mark on Turkish football history. The team's legendary players include Nihat Bekdik nicknamed Aslan (Lion); the 1930s national hero Eşfak Aykaç; Boduri who died aged 21; Mehmet Leblebi who scored a domestic record of 14 goals in a single match; Gündüz Kılıç nicknamed Baba (Father) who was the coach but also the player of his team in the 1950s, with great success in both duties;

Bülent-Reha Eken brothers; Suat Mamat who scored three goals in the 1954 FIFA World Cup; Coşkun Özarı who devoted his life to Galatasaray; Turgay Şeren the heroic goalkeeper who was called "the Panther of Berlin" for his national duties; Fatih Terim, the team captain of Galatasaray and the Turkish national football team for many years, who won the UEFA Cup in 2000 as the Galatasaray's coach; Metin Oktay the legendary six-time top-scorer of the Turkish Super League; Hakan Şükür, the player who scored most goals in Süper Lig history with 249; Zoran Simović, another skilled goalkeeper known for his penalty saves; Cüneyt Tanman who played a record of 342 games for Galatasaray; Tanju Çolak, an extraordinary goalscorer and the 1988 European Golden Boot winner with Galatasaray; Cevad Prekazi, an Albanian specializing in free kicks; Cláudio Taffarel the World Cup-winning goalkeeper for Brazil; Gheorghe Hagi, the Romanian international who is still described by some as the best foreign player ever to play in Turkey; Brazilian striker Mário Jardel, dubbed "Super Mário" by the fans and scored both of Galatasaray's two goals in the 2000 UEFA Super Cup match against Real Madrid, along with the man of the match Okan Buruk who is the current coach.

Galatasaray is a team of emotions. It is a team of footballers who are in love with its colors and love each other. Galatasaray is a team of players who work with sacrifice and dedication. Galatasaray doesn't like the conceited, self-centered individuals. In short, Galatasaray is a team of people who pull the rope together, who know how to be sad together and rejoice together..

— Gündüz Kılıç

=== Name and pronunciation ===
Galatasaray (Turkish pronunciation: [ɡalatasaˈɾaj]) is a quarter in Karaköy in the Beyoğlu district of Istanbul, located at the northern shore of the Golden Horn. Its name comes from that of Galata, which may in turn have derived from Galatai (meaning the "Galatians"), as the Celtic tribes were thought to have camped at Galata during the Hellenistic period before settling in Galatia in central Anatolia. Galatasaray translates directly as "Galata Palace" (saray means "palace" in Turkish). Galatasaray High School, established in the area in 1481, was the progenitor of Galatasaray S.K. as well as other institutions of Galatasaray Community.

Galatasaray is a compound word and is pronounced as such, with a very brief pause between the two words. There is no diminutive form of the club's name. Fans refer to the club either by its full name or by its nickname Cim-Bom(-Bom), pronounced: [dʒim bom (bom)]). The person who brought this slogan to Turkey was Sabit Cinol. While Cinol was in Switzerland for education, he also played football. Inspired by the slogan of Servette, the club he played for, Cinol adapted this slogan for Galatasaray, and this adaptation was embraced by the club and the wider community. However, the shortened form "Gala" is sometimes used by English speakers.

== Crest and colours ==
First crest

Galatasaray's first emblem was drawn by 333 [School Number] Şevki Ege. This was the figure of a spread-winged eagle with a football in its beak. The eagle was a model emblem that Galatasaray dwelled on in the beginning. But when the name did not attract too much interest, Şevki Ege's composition was pushed aside. It was replaced by the current design in the 1920s. This replaced in 1925 by the current "Ghayn-Sin" crest, which are the first two Arabic letters of "G"alata "S"aray, designed by Ayetullah Emin.

We were picturing the yellow-red flames shining on our team and dreaming that it would take us to victories. Indeed it did.

— Ali Sami Yen

At first, the colours of Galatasaray were red and white, like the Turkish flag. On 6 December 1908, for a match against the football team of the Royal Navy cruiser HMS Barham, Galatasaray finally settled on playing in red and yellow, inspired by the roses which Gül Baba offered to Sultan Bayezid II. Ali Sami Yen stated, "After we have been in and out of several shops, we saw two different elegant-looking wool materials in Fatty Yanko's store at Bahçekapısı (between Eminönü and Sirkeci in Istanbul, now called Bahçekapı). One of them was quite dark red, resembling the cherry color, and the other a rich yellow with a touch of orange. When the sales clerk made the two fabrics fly together with a twist of his hand they became so bright that it reminded us the beauty of a goldfinch. We thought we were looking at the colors flickering in burning fire. We were picturing the yellow-red flames shining on our team and dreaming that it would take us to victories. Indeed it did."

=== Kit history ===
==== Home kit ====
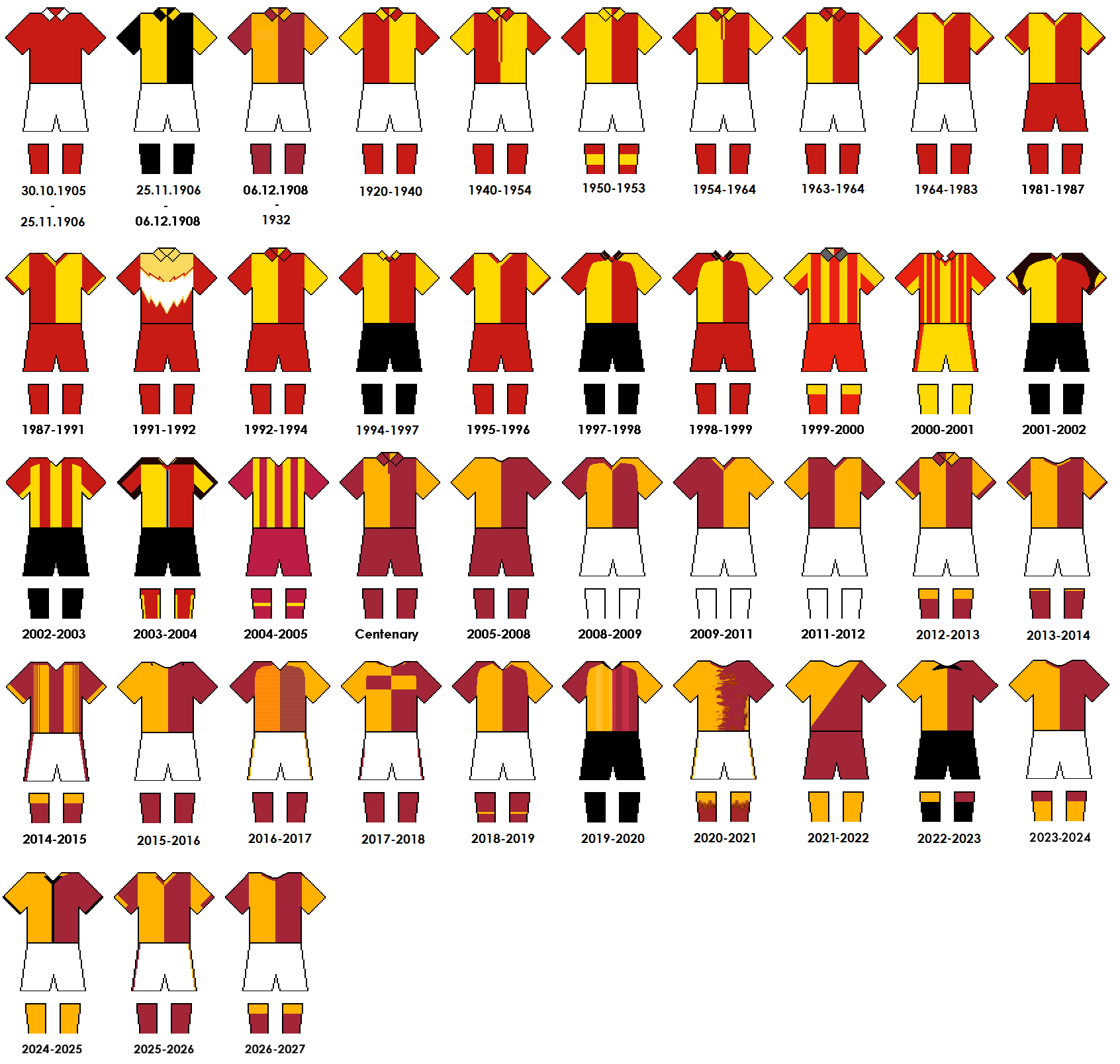
Home kit history

Galatasaray's classic home kit "Parçalı"

The Galatasaray home kit has always been fundamentally the same since 1908. The traditional shirt of Galatasaray is the eight-piece halved design called "parçalı" (sectional). This consists of the shirt's front, back and sleeves being made up of two colours, resulting in the shirt being split into eight parts. (Two of the same colours are never next to each other within the 8 parts). The colours continue in an alternating order, from yellow to red. This results in the front of the shirt being the opposite of the back and the shirt also having an halved design from the side. This alternating colour order of eight parts creates a complete halved design for the shirt. The classic eight-piece halved design would become the iconic look of Galatasaray for years to come. The official colours are Pantone shades 1235 (yellow) and 201 (red).

=== Kit suppliers and shirt sponsors ===
Period	Kit manufacturer			Shirt sponsor								
Period	Kit manufacturer			Chest _{(domestic matches)}			Back	Sleeve			Chest _{(European matches)}	Sleeve _{(European matches)}
1977–78	–			Volvo		PeReJa	—					
1978–79	Adidas	Çamlıca		—								
1979–80	Adidas	Umbro		Halı Fleks			—	—			—	—
1980–81	Adidas	Umbro	Puma	Telefunken	Alo	Turkish Airlines	—	—	—		—	—
1981–82	Adidas	Gola		Borsaş		Meban	—	—	—		—	—
1982–83	Umbro			Borsaş		Meban	—	—	—		—	—
1983–84	—			Telefunken			—	—	—		—	—
1984–85	Adidas		Fatih	Modell's		Denizbank	—	—	—		—	—
1985–86	Adidas			Denizbank			—	—	—		—	—
1986–91	Adidas			TürkBank			—	—	—		—	—
1991–95	Umbro			SHOW TV			—	—	—		—	—
1995–97	Adidas			VakıfBank			—	—	—		—	—
1997–98	Adidas			Bank Ekspres			—	—	—		—	—
1998–2000	Adidas			Marshall Boya			—	—	—		—	—
2000–01	Adidas			Telsim			—	—	—		—	—
2001–02	Lotto			Aria			—	—	—		—	—
2002–04	Umbro			Aria			—	—	—		—	—
2004–05	Umbro			Avea			—	—	—		—	—
2005–09	Adidas			Avea			—	—	—		—	—
2009–11	Adidas			Türk Telekom			—	—	—		—	—
2011–14	Nike			Türk Telekom			—	—	—		—	—
2014–15	Nike			Huawei			—	—	—		—	—
2015–16	Nike			Dumankaya			—	—	—		—	—
2016	Nike			UNDP			—	—	—		—	—
2016–17	Nike			Nef			—	—	—		—	—
2017–19	Nike			Nef							Turkish Airlines	—
2019–20	Nike			Terra Pizza			Bilyoner	Magdeburger Sigorta			Turkish Airlines	—
2020–21	Nike			Sixt			Magdeburger Sigorta	Nesine.com			Turkish Airlines	—
2021–22	Nike			Sixt			Nesine.com	Getir			Turkish Airlines	—
2022–23	Nike			Sixt			Nesine.com	Tunç Holding			—	—
2023–24	Nike			Sixt			Tatilsepeti	Bilyoner	GKN Kargo	Yünsa	SOCAR	Turkish Airlines
2024–25	Puma			Sixt			Pasifik Holding	Arkham	Bilyoner		SOCAR	Turkish Airlines
2025–26	Puma			Pasifik Holding			CW Enerji	Arkham	Misli		SOCAR	Turkish Airlines
2026–27	Puma			Pasifik Holding			—	Misli	Sürat Kargo		Pasifik Holding	Turkish Airlines

== Grounds ==
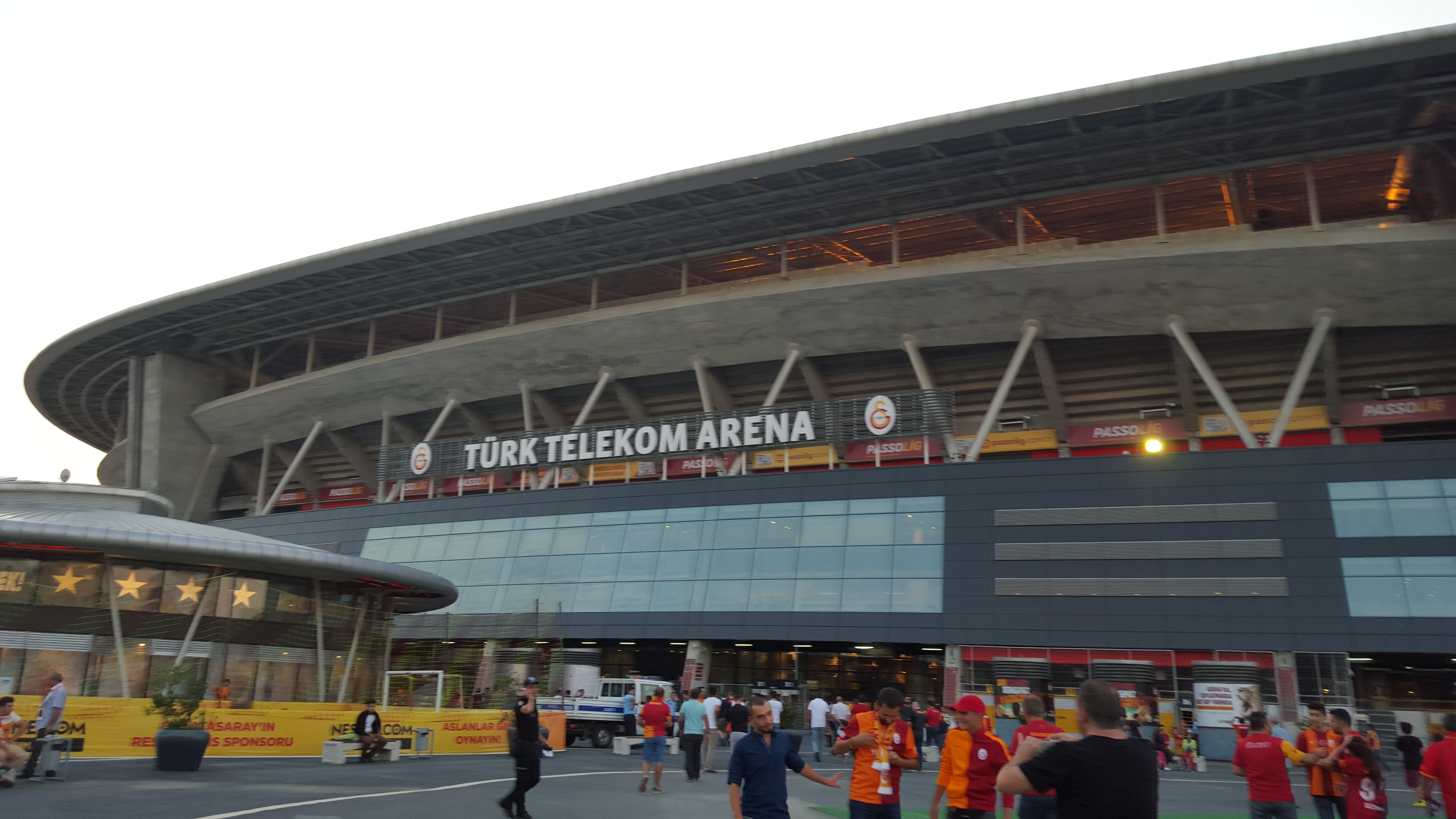
Exterior of Rams Park

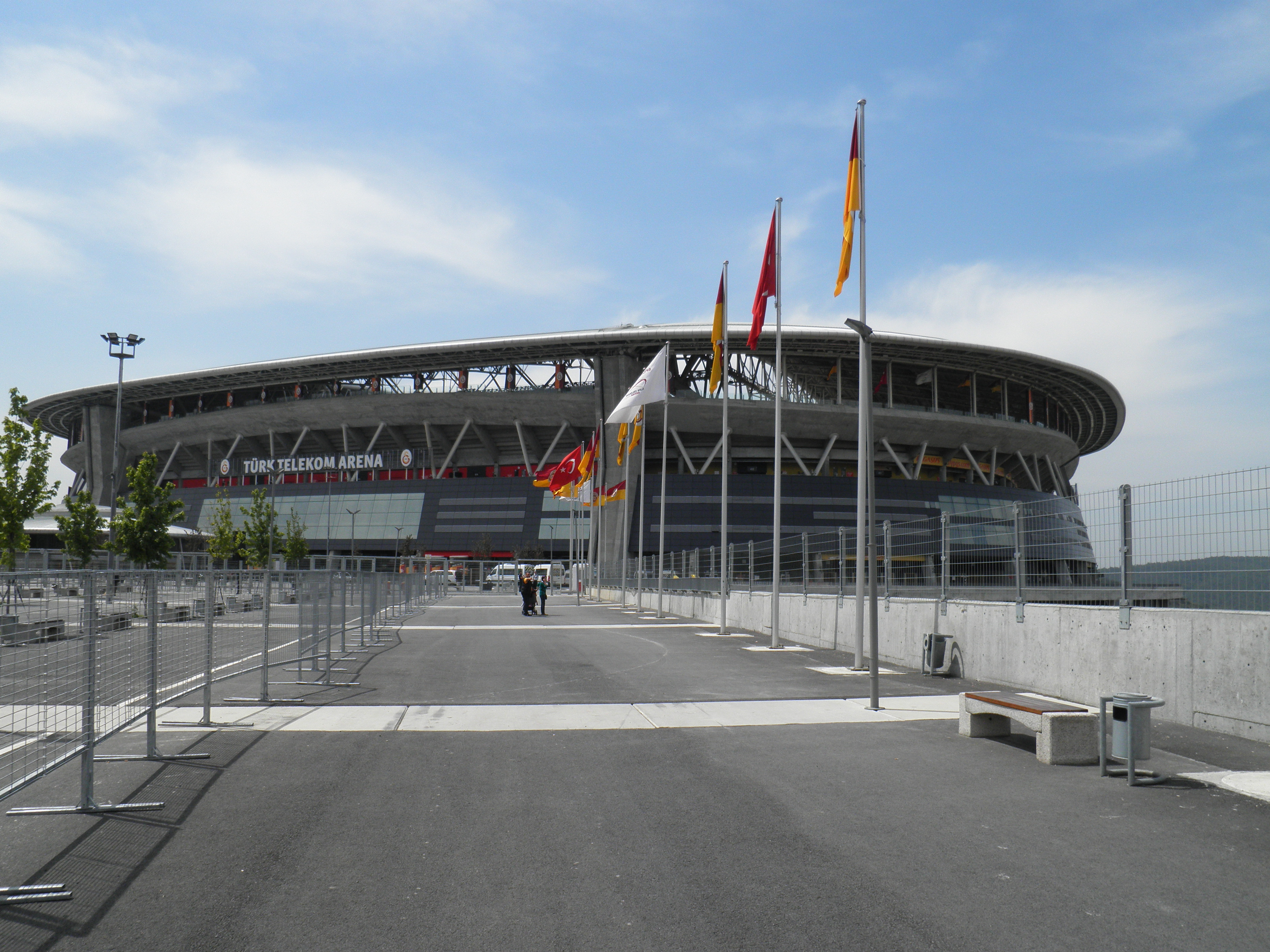
Main road to Rams Park

=== Ali Sami Yen Stadium ===
When Galatasaray were formed no Turkish teams had their own home ground, and all games in the Istanbul Football League took place at Papazın Çayırı – now the site of Fenerbahçe's Şükrü Saracoğlu Stadium. In 1921 the city's first proper football stadium was constructed, Taksim Stadium, which was used as the home ground for all of Istanbul's teams. When the historic Taksim Stadium was demolished in 1940, Galatasaray decided to build a large, modern stadium. Due to difficulties stemming from World War II, construction was delayed for over two decades. In this period, they played in Şeref Stadi and Dolmabahçe Stadi On 20 December 1964, Ali Sami Yen Stadium opened. Named after the founder of Galatasaray, Ali Sami Yen, it was in the Mecidiyeköy quarter of the Şişli district at the center of the city. In 1964, the stadium had a capacity of over 35,000. Due to improvements in security and prohibition of non-seater spectators, the all-seater capacity was reduced to 22,000 in 1993. A few years later, the rebuild of main stand, which was damaged by an earthquake, slightly increased the capacity. After 2002, when Atatürk Olympic Stadium was built for Istanbul's Olympic Games bid, Galatasaray started to play European Cup matches there. The attendance record among Turkish stadiums was broken there, in Galatasaray–Olympiacos match played in front of 79,414 spectators. Yet, Ali Sami Yen Stadium has historic importance for Galatasaray fans although it is smaller and older. The stadium was demolished in 2011 after Galatasaray moved to the newly built Rams Park.

=== Rams Park ===
The new home ground of Galatasaray is the newly built Rams Park in the Seyrantepe area of Sarıyer. It is also known as Ali Sami Yen Spor Kompleksi. The new stadium, which was opened on 15 January 2011, has a capacity of 53,387 seats, making it the largest private stadium used by a club in Turkey.

The roof of the stadium contains 10,404 solar panels, earning it the Guinness World Record for "the most powerful solar output from a sports stadium" (4.2 MW). In 2025, Rams Park ranked second on the World Economic Forum's list of the world's seven most environmentally friendly stadiums.

==== Stadium rituals ====
Since 1992, after every goal scored by Galatasaray, the chorus of the song "I Will Survive" by the Hermes House Band is played, followed by the sound of a roaring lion. However, two players have a unique song played in the stadium after they score: Mauro Icardi ("Aşkın Olayım") and Bafetimbi Gomis ("Sen Olsan Bari"). In addition, after the starting 11 is announced in the stadium, the Galatasaray "Warchant" is played, accompanied by what the fans call a "scarf show," where they display and wave their scarves, banners and flags as the start of the song "Gerçekleri Tarih Yazar" is played. After the match, if Galatasaray wins, the fans will call the team to the stands to celebrate. In these celebrations, the players and fans perform a signature chant called an "üçlü". The "üçlü" ritual is also performed by the fans at the start of every match.

=== Stadium history ===
#	Stadium	Years
1	Papazın Çayırı	1905–1921
2	Taksim Stadı	1921–1940
3	Şeref Stadı	1940–1948
4	Dolmabahçe Stadı	1948–1966
5	Ali Sami Yen Stadı	1966–1972
6	Dolmabahçe Stadı	1972–1980
7	Ali Sami Yen Stadı	1980–1984
8	Dolmabahçe Stadı	1984–1986
9	Ali Sami Yen Stadı	1986–2003
10	Atatürk Olimpiyat Stadı	2003–2004
11	Ali Sami Yen Stadı	2004–2011
12	Rams Park	2011–

#	Stadium	Years played
1	Ali Sami Yen Stadı	34
2	Dolmabahçe Stadı	28
3	Taksim Stadı	18
4	Papazın Çayırı	17
5	Rams Park	15
6	Şeref Stadı	8
7	Atatürk Olimpiyat Stadı	1

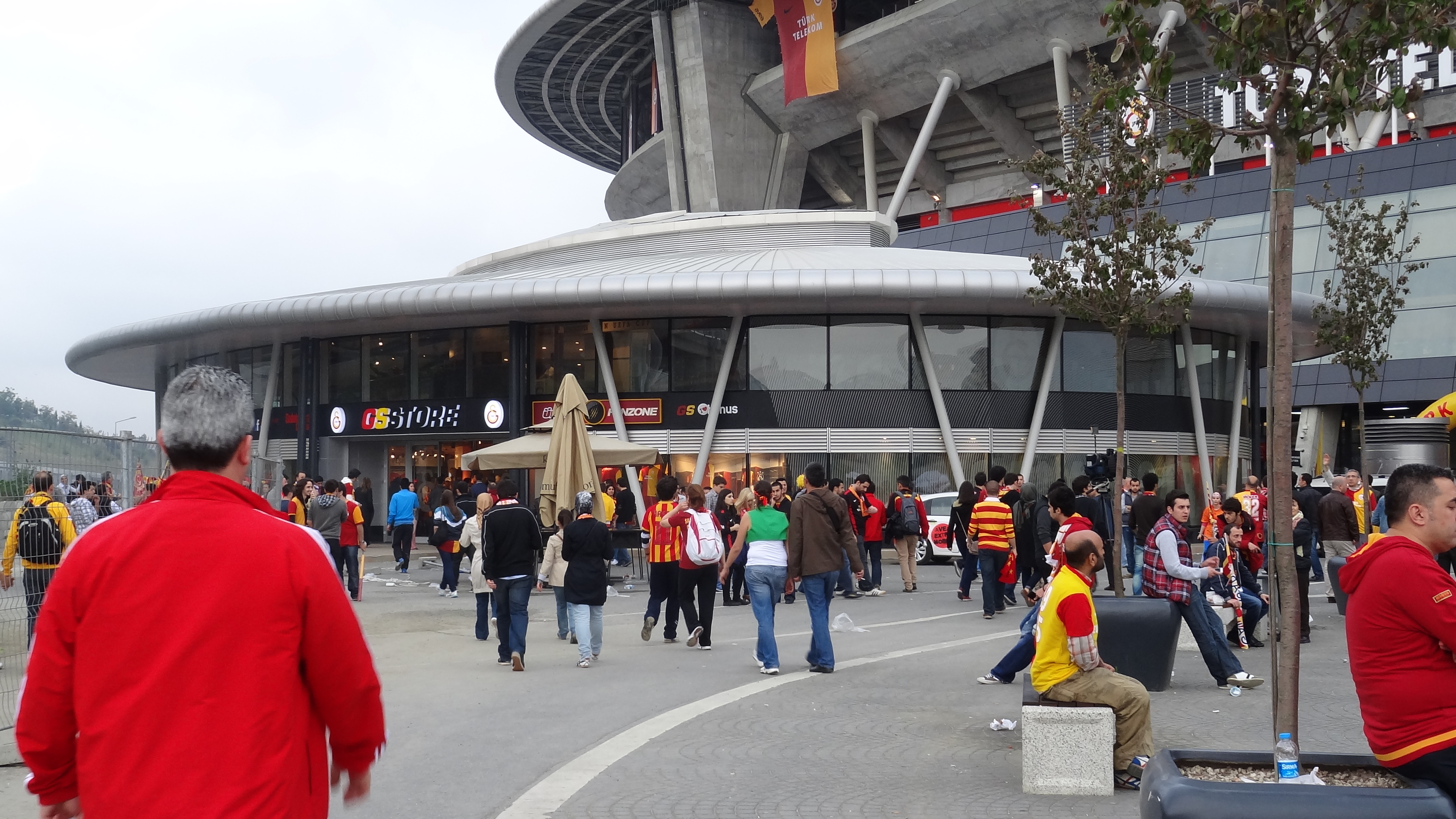
Galatasaray Store at Rams Park

== Support and fanbase ==
=== European matches ===
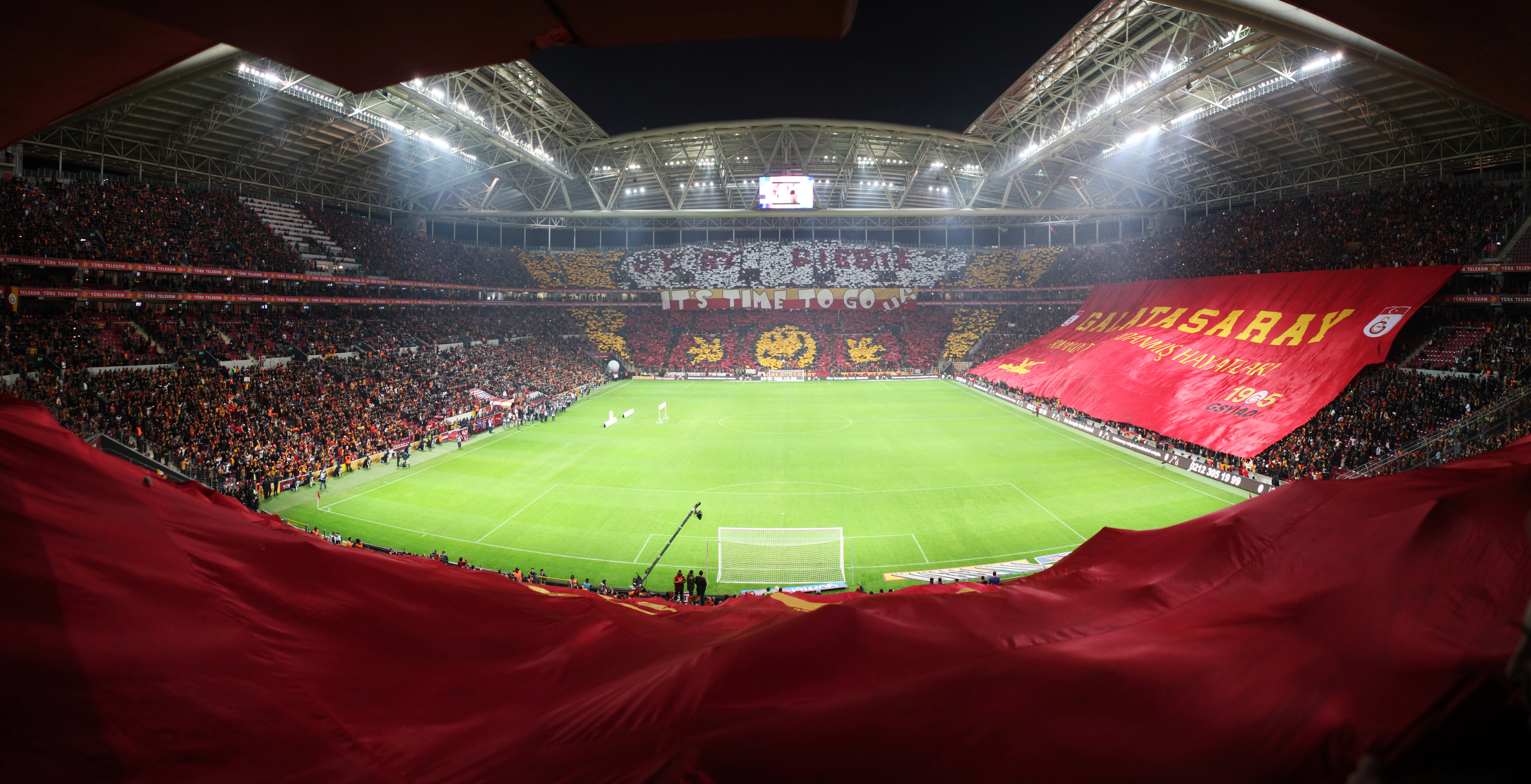
Galatasaray fans

Galatasaray fans place significant emphasis on European competitions. The club's supporters refer to Galatasaray as the "Conqueror of Europe", a nickname that references the club's victories in the UEFA Cup and the UEFA Super Cup during the 1999–2000 season. Galatasaray fans, including the group ultrAslan, have been described as among the most vocal supporters in European football. In an interview, Ryan Giggs commented on the atmosphere at Galatasaray's stadium: "Three hours before kick-off, we went out to have a look at the pitch and the stadium was overcrowded! The chanting was brilliant: one side starts, then the other, then quiet, then all of them chanting! The players really enjoyed it. Before it was good, after it wasn't for us."

=== Records ===
Galatasaray fans broke the "loudest crowd roar at a sport stadium" record on 18 March 2011 at Galatasaray's new stadium Rams Park in Istanbul. A peak reading of 140.76 dBA was recorded.

On 12 May 2024, Galatasaray broke the longest home winning streak record (17), beating their own record (14 on 11 March 2023) in Turkish Süper Lig history with a 3–2 win over FK Karagümrük.

=== Chants ===
Galatasaray fans' chants are an integral part of their football culture, creating a hostile and loud environment. Some of Galatasaray's most well known chants include:

Chant name	Lyrics (Turkish)	Lyrics (English)
Gerçekleri Tarih Yazar (History Writes the Truth)	Dört sene üst üste şampiyon olduk. Avrupa'nın kralı olduk. Gerçekleri tarih yazar, tarihi de Galatasaray.	We became champions four years in a row. We became the king of Europe. History writes the truth, and history is written by Galatasaray.
Şereftir Seni Sevmek (It Is An Honour To Love You)	Şereftir seni sevmek, senle ağlayıp gülmek. Galatasaray sevgisi sürecek sonsuza dek. Yetmiyor ki stadlar, kalbimiz senle çarpar. Layıksın bu sevgiye, şanlı Galatasaray.	It is an honour to love you, to cry and laugh with you. The love for Galatasaray will last forever. Stadiums are not enough. Our hearts beat with you. You are worthy of this love, glorious Galatasaray.
Adanmış Hayatların Umudu (The Hope of Dedicated Lives)	Sen gözümün nuru, adanmış hayatların umudu, şanlı Galatasaray. Ol, sen şampiyon ol, inlesin tüm ülke zaferinle, şanlı Galatasaray.	You're the light of my eyes, the hope of dedicated lives, glorious Galatasaray. Be, be the champion, let the whole country moan with your victory, glorious Galatasaray.
Çocukluk Aşkımsın (You Are My Childhood Love)	Çocukluk aşkımsın, sen ilk göz ağrımsın. Kimseyi, kimseyi, sevmedim senin gibi. Sevdanın uğruna terk ettim her şeyi. Hayatın anlamı Galatasaray.	You are my childhood love. You are my first love. I’ve loved no one, no one like you. For the sake of your love, I gave up everything. The meaning of life is Galatasaray.

There are dozens of other chants however those listed above are the most popular.

=== Istanbul derbies ===
"The big three" clubs of Istanbul – Beşiktaş, Fenerbahçe and Galatasaray – have a century-long history of rivalry. The Galatasaray–Fenerbahçe rivalry is the primary Istanbul derby and the most important rivalry in Turkish sports. The rivalry poses a symbolic importance to supporters due to an assumed superiority that comes with winning the derby. Supporters are often quoted as stating that winning the league without winning the derby is hollow. There is always huge interest in the derby due to its fierce nature on and off the pitch. Many documentaries have been made about the derby including an episode of "The Real Football Factories International". The rivalry has led to violence among supporters on numerous occasions, though this has been on the decline in recent years. The typical features of derby days include jammed traffic near the sold out stadium, loud support throughout the match and taunting choreography displays by supporters before kick off. Other top level Istanbul derbies include the teams İstanbul Başakşehir and Kasımpaşa, although these teams pose a minor rivalry as the history and the nationwide attention to the derbies among the big three is unmatched.

Torches, smoke, drums, flags and giant posters are used to create visual grandeur and apply psychological pressure on visiting teams, which fans call "welcoming them to hell".

== Honours ==
Galatasaray S.K. honours
Type	Competition	Titles	Seasons
Domestic	Süper Lig	26	1961–62, 1962–63, 1968–69, 1970–71, 1971–72, 1972–73, 1986–87, 1987–88, 1992–93, 1993–94, 1996–97, 1997–98, 1998–99, 1999–2000, 2001–02, 2005–06, 2007–08, 2011–12, 2012–13, 2014–15, 2017–18, 2018–19, 2022–23, 2023–24, 2024–25, 2025–26
Domestic	Turkish Cup	19	1962–63, 1963–64, 1964–65, 1965–66, 1972–73, 1975–76, 1981–82, 1984–85, 1990–91, 1992–93, 1995–96, 1998–99, 1999–2000, 2004–05, 2013–14, 2014–15, 2015–16, 2018–19, 2024–25
Domestic	Turkish Super Cup	17	1966, 1969, 1972, 1982, 1987, 1988, 1991, 1993, 1996, 1997, 2008, 2012, 2013, 2015, 2016, 2019, 2023
Domestic	Prime Minister's Cup	5	1975, 1979, 1986, 1990, 1995
Domestic	Turkish National Division	1	1939
Domestic	50th Anniversary Cup	1	1973
Continental	UEFA Cup	1	1999–2000
Continental	UEFA Super Cup	1	2000
Regional	Istanbul Football League	15	1908–09, 1909–10, 1910–11, 1914–15, 1915–16, 1921–22, 1924–25, 1925–26, 1926–27, 1928–29, 1930–31, 1948–49, 1954–55, 1955–56, 1957–58
Regional	Istanbul Football Cup	2^{S}	1942, 1943

- record
- ^{S} Shared record

=== Doubles, Trebles and Quadruples ===
- Quadruples
  - Süper Lig, Turkish Cup, UEFA Europa League, UEFA Super Cup (1): 1999–2000
- Trebles
  - Süper Lig, Turkish Cup and TFF Super Cup (2): 1992–93, 2014-15, 2018–19
- Doubles
  - Süper Lig and Turkish Cup (5): 1962–63, 1972–73, 1998–99, 2018–19, 2024–25
  - Süper Lig and TFF Super Cup (9): 1968–69, 1971–72, 1986–87, 1987–88, 1996–97, 2007–08, 2011–12, 2012–13, 2022–23

=== Other ===
- Turkish Amateur Football Championship
  - Winners (1): 1952
- Istanbul Shield
  - Winners (1): 1932–33
- TSYD Cup
  - Winners (12): 1963, 1966, 1967, 1970, 1977, 1981, 1987, 1991, 1992, 1997, 1998, 1999 (shared-record)
  - Runners-up (9): 1965, 1969, 1971, 1973, 1976, 1979, 1980, 1986, 1991
- Atatürk Gazi Cup
  - Winners (1): 1928
- Emirates Cup
  - Winners (1): 2013
- Antalya Cup
  - Winners (1): 2014
- Uhrencup
  - Winners (1): 2016

== Players ==
=== Current squad ===
As of 4 September 2026

Note: Flags indicate national team as defined under FIFA eligibility rules; some limited exceptions apply. Players may hold more than one non-FIFA nationality.

No.	Pos.	Nation	Player
1	GK	TUR	Uğurcan Çakır
3	DF	FRA	Chadaille Bitshiabu (on loan from RB Leipzig)
4	DF	SEN	Ismail Jakobs
5	MF	TUR	Eyüp Aydın
6	DF	COL	Davinson Sánchez
7	DF	HUN	Roland Sallai
8	MF	BRA	Gabriel Sara
10	FW	GER	Leroy Sané
11	FW	TUR	Yunus Akgün (3rd captain)
17	DF	TUR	Eren Elmalı
18	MF	FRA	Lesley Ugochukwu (on loan from Burnley)
19	GK	TUR	Günay Güvenç
20	MF	GER	İlkay Gündoğan
21	FW	TUR	Deniz Gül
23	DF	TUR	Kaan Ayhan (vice-captain)
24	GK	TUR	Jankat Yılmaz

No.	Pos.	Nation	Player
27	FW	POR	Rafael Leão
29	MF	ARG	Armando Güner
34	MF	URU	Lucas Torreira
42	DF	TUR	Abdülkerim Bardakcı (captain)
45	FW	NGR	Victor Osimhen
53	FW	TUR	Barış Yılmaz (4th captain)
60	GK	TUR	Arda Yılmaz
62	FW	TUR	Ada Yüzgeç
70	GK	TUR	Enes Büyük
73	MF	TUR	Berat Luş
74	MF	GBS	Renato Nhaga
83	MF	RUS	Aleksey Batrakov
88	DF	MKD	Kazımcan Karataş
90	DF	CIV	Wilfried Singo
91	DF	TUR	Arda Ünyay
99	MF	GAB	Mario Lemina

=== Academy players with first team shirt numbers ===
Note: Flags indicate national team as defined under FIFA eligibility rules; some limited exceptions apply. Players may hold more than one non-FIFA nationality.

No.	Pos.	Nation	Player
51	FW	TUR	Arda Tagay
52	GK	TUR	Cem Eroğlu
56	DF	TUR	Yusuf Sivaslıoğlu
57	MF	TUR	Oğulcan Yançel
58	MF	USA	Ada Karatepe
63	DF	TUR	Abdulsamet Şimşek

No.	Pos.	Nation	Player
64	DF	TUR	Dağhan Kahraman
67	MF	TUR	Eyüp Karasu
68	MF	TUR	Furkan Koçak
71	DF	TUR	Cihan Akgün
75	DF	TUR	Emir Esen
76	MF	TUR	Onur Yıldız
78	FW	TUR	Efe Gündal

=== Out on loan ===
Note: Flags indicate national team as defined under FIFA eligibility rules; some limited exceptions apply. Players may hold more than one non-FIFA nationality.

No.	Pos.	Nation	Player
—	DF	TUR	Ali Yeşilyurt (at (Turkey) Elazığspor until 30 June 2027)
—	DF	COL	Carlos Cuesta (at (Brazil) Vasco until 31 December 2026)
—	MF	POL	Przemysław Frankowski (at (France) Rennes until 30 June 2027)
—	DF	TUR	Metehan Baltacı (at (Turkey) Gençlerbirliği until 30 June 2027)
—	DF	DEN	Elias Jelert (at (France) Le Havre until 30 June 2027)

No.	Pos.	Nation	Player
—	MF	TUR	Berat Yılmaz (at (Turkey) Ümraniyespor until 30 June 2027)
—	MF	TUR	Ege Araç (at (Turkey) Adana 01 until 30 June 2027)
—	FW	TUR	Ahmed Kutucu (at (Turkey) Rizespor until 30 June 2027)
—	FW	TUR	Yalın Dilek (at (Turkey) Bandırmaspor until 30 June 2027)
—	FW	TUR	Halil Dervişoğlu (at (Turkey) Gaziantep until 30 June 2027)

=== Former players ===
==== Club captains ====
(Bulgaria) Boris Nikolov	1905–12
(Turkey) Adil Giray	1920–24
(Turkey) Nihat Bekdik	1924–36
(Turkey) Gündüz Kılıç	1936–53
(Turkey) Bülent Eken	1953–54
(Turkey) Coşkun Özarı	1954–60
(Turkey) Turgay Şeren	1960–67
(Turkey) Metin Oktay	1967–69
(Turkey) Talat Özkarslı	1969–71

(Turkey) Uğur Köken	1971–73
(Turkey) Muzaffer Sipahi	1973–75
(Turkey) Nihat Akbay	1975–78
(Turkey) Mehmet Oğuz	1978–79
(Turkey) Gökmen Özdenak	1979–80
(Turkey) Fatih Terim	1980–85
(Turkey) Cüneyt Tanman	1985–91
(Turkey) Erdal Keser	1991–94
(Turkey) Tugay Kerimoğlu	1994–95

(Turkey) Bülent Korkmaz	1995–05
(Turkey) Hakan Şükür	2005–08
(Turkey) Ümit Karan	2008–09
(Turkey) Arda Turan	2009–11
(Turkey) Sabri Sarıoğlu	2011–14
(Turkey) Selçuk İnan	2014–20
(Uruguay) Fernando Muslera	2020–25
(Argentina) Mauro Icardi	2025–26
(Turkey) Abdülkerim Bardakcı	2026-

== Staff ==
=== Technical staff ===
Position	Name
Head Coach	(Turkey) Okan Buruk
Assistant Coach	(Turkey) İrfan Saraloğlu
Assistant Coach	(Spain) Ismael García Gómez
Assistant Coach	(Turkey) M. Can Mutlu
Assistant Coach	(Turkey) Orhan Atik
Goalkeeping Coach	(Turkey) Fadıl Koşutan
Goalkeeping Coach	(Turkey) Can Okuyucu
Goalkeeping Coach	(Turkey) Eray İşcan
Athletic Performance Coach	(Turkey) Kaan Arısoy
Athletic Performance Coach	(Turkey) Yusuf Köklü
Athletic Performance Coach	(Turkey) Gürkan Fuat Demir
Athletic Performance Coach	(Turkey) Vural Durmuş
Match and Performance Analyst	(Turkey) Yılmaz Yüksel
Match and Performance Analyst	(Turkey) Serhat Doğan
Match and Performance Analyst	(Turkey) Ali Yavuz
Match and Performance Analyst	(Turkey) Furkan Uçar
Administrative Manager	(Turkey) Uğur Yıldız
Scouting and Performance Analysis Manager	(Turkey) Emre Utkucan
Team Doctor	(Turkey) Yener İnce
Team Doctor	(Turkey) Hakan Çelebi
Media and Communications Manager	(Turkey) Coşkun Gülbahar
Media Officer	(Turkey) Egehan Şengül
Team Translator	(Turkey) Ersan Zeren
Team Translator	(Turkey) Utku Yurtbil
Dietitian	(Turkey) Mestan Hüseyin Çilekçi
Physiotherapist	(Turkey) Mustafa Korkmaz
Physiotherapist	(Turkey) Burak Koca
Physiotherapist	(Turkey) Samet Polat
Physiotherapist	(Turkey) Erkan Özyılmaz
Masseur	(Turkey) Sedat Peker
Masseur	(Turkey) Batuhan Erkan
Masseur	(Turkey) Ozan Abaylı
Masseur	(Turkey) Serdal Yılmaz
Outfitter	(Turkey) Hasan Çelik
Outfitter	(Turkey) Veli Muğlı
Outfitter	(Turkey) İlyas Gökçe
Outfitter	(Turkey) Harun Karakaş

Last updated: 29 August 2026.
Source: Futbol A Takım İdari ve Teknik Kadro - GALATASARAY.ORG

=== Presidents ===
Name	From–to
(Turkey) Faruk Süren	1996–01
(Turkey) Mehmet Cansun	2001–02
(Turkey) Özhan Canaydın	2002–08
(Turkey) Adnan Polat	2008–11
(Turkey) Ünal Aysal	2011–14
(Turkey) Duygun Yarsuvat	2014–15
(Turkey) Dursun Özbek	2015–18
(Turkey) Mustafa Cengiz	2018–21
(Turkey) Burak Elmas	2021–22
(Turkey) Dursun Özbek	2022–

== Recent seasons ==
Results of league and cup competitions by season
Season	League									Domestic Cup		Europe		Other		Top goalscorer(s)	
Season	Division	Pos	Pl.	W	D	L	GF	GA	Pts	Comp.	Result	Comp.	Result	Comp.	Result	Player(s)	Goals
2011–12	Süper Lig	1st	40	25	11	4	78	30	86	Turkish Cup	R16	—				Selçuk İnan	13
2012–13	Süper Lig	1st	34	21	8	5	66	35	71	Turkish Cup	5R	Champions League	QF	Super Cup	C	Burak Yılmaz	32
2013–14	Süper Lig	2nd	34	18	11	5	59	32	65	Turkish Cup	C	Champions League	R16	Super Cup	C	Burak Yılmaz	18
2014–15	Süper Lig	1st	34	24	5	5	60	35	77	Turkish Cup	C	Champions League	GS	Super Cup	F	Burak Yılmaz	22
2015–16	Süper Lig	6th	34	13	12	9	69	49	51	Turkish Cup	C	Champions League	GS	Super Cup	C	Lukas Podolski	17
2015–16	Süper Lig	6th	34	13	12	9	69	49	51	Turkish Cup	C	Europa League	R32	Super Cup	C	Lukas Podolski	17
2016–17	Süper Lig	4th	34	20	4	10	65	40	64	Turkish Cup	R16	—		Super Cup	C	Lukas Podolski	17
2017–18	Süper Lig	1st	34	24	3	7	75	33	75	Turkish Cup	SF	Europa League	2QR	—		Bafétimbi Gomis	32
2018–19	Süper Lig	1st	34	20	9	5	72	36	69	Turkish Cup	C	Champions League	GS	Super Cup	F	Henry Onyekuru	16
2018–19	Süper Lig	1st	34	20	9	5	72	36	69	Turkish Cup	C	Europa League	R32	Super Cup	F	Henry Onyekuru	16
2019–20	Süper Lig	6th	34	15	11	8	55	37	56	Turkish Cup	QF	Champions League	GS	Super Cup	C	Adem Büyük Radamel Falcao	11
2020–21	Süper Lig	2nd	40	26	6	8	80	36	84	Turkish Cup	QF	Europa League	PQR	—		Mbaye Diagne	11
2021–22	Süper Lig	13th	38	14	10	14	51	53	52	Turkish Cup	5R	Champions League	2QR	—		Kerem Aktürkoğlu	13
2021–22	Süper Lig	13th	38	14	10	14	51	53	52	Turkish Cup	5R	Europa League	R16	—		Kerem Aktürkoğlu	13
2022–23	Süper Lig	1st	36	28	4	4	83	27	88	Turkish Cup	QF	—				Mauro Icardi	23
2023–24	Süper Lig	1st	38	33	3	2	92	26	102	Turkish Cup	QF	Champions League	GS	Super Cup	C	Mauro Icardi	32
2023–24	Süper Lig	1st	38	33	3	2	92	26	102	Turkish Cup	QF	Europa League	KPO	Super Cup	C	Mauro Icardi	32
2024–25	Süper Lig	1st	36	30	5	1	91	31	95	Turkish Cup	C	Europa League	KPO	Super Cup	F	Victor Osimhen	37
2025–26	Süper Lig	1st	34	24	5	5	77	30	77	Turkish Cup	QF	Champions League	R16	Super Cup	F	Victor Osimhen	22

== Youth facilities ==
Galatasaray has one of the most successful youth facilities in Turkey. The Gündüz Kılıç Youth Facilities in Florya is the center of the department. Galatasaray U21 have won the Turkish Youth League three times.

Galatasaray football academy trains children aged between seven and fifteen. It has 79 locations, including sites in Turkey, Australia, Germany, Belgium and the United Kingdom.

== Sponsorship ==
Companies that Galatasaray S.K. currently has sponsorship deals with include:

Licensee	Product
Puma	Kit supplier
Rams Global	Stadium name sponsor
Pasifik Holding	Chest sponsor
Misli	Sleeve sponsor
Turkish Airlines	Sleeve sponsor (European matches)
Reges Elektrik	Shorts sponsor
Acıbadem	Official sponsor
Bigjoy	Official sponsor
Diversey	Official sponsor
Dreame	Official sponsor
EA Sports FC	Official sponsor
IFS	Official sponsor
iGA Pass	Official sponsor
Kale Seyahat	Official sponsor
Sultan	Official sponsor
Ülker	Official sponsor
