= Gündüz Kılıç =

Turkish footballer

"Baba" Gündüz Kılıç
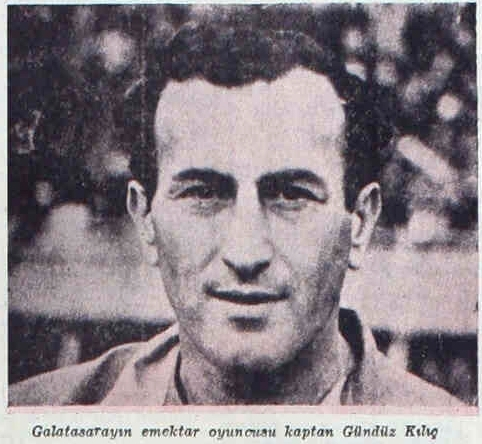

Personal information
- Date of birth: 29 October 1918
- Place of birth: Istanbul, Ottoman Empire
- Date of death: 17 May 1980 (aged 61)
- Place of death: New York City, United States
- Position: Forward

Senior career*
Years	Team	Apps	(Gls)
1934–1945	Galatasaray SK	115	(99)
1945–1946	Ankara Demirspor	9	(8)
1946–1953	Galatasaray SK	67	(32)
Total		191	(139)

International career
1936–1951	Turkey	11	(5)

Managerial career
- 1952–1953: Galatasaray SK
- 1953–1954: Vefa S.K.
- 1954: Turkey
- 1954–1957: Galatasaray SK
- 1959–1960: Feriköy SK
- 1960–1967: Galatasaray SK
- 1968–1969: Altay SK
- 1971–1972: Beşiktaş J.K.
- * Club domestic league appearances and goals

"Baba" Gündüz Kılıç (29 October 1918 – 17 May 1980) was a Turkish football player and coach. He was Ali Kılıç's son and Altemur Kılıç's brother.

== Biography ==
Born in 1918 in Istanbul, Gündüz Kılıç attended Galatasaray Lycee and then started his football career as a center forward with Galatasaray SK. He was a strong, big, well-educated, player and hungry for success. He never looked flashy, yet was never boring. Kılıç was the individual behind the rise of Turkish football schooling football players that would become managers after their career. He was also part of Turkey's squad at the 1936 Summer Olympics, but he did not play in any matches.

He took a break from his career in 1938, moving to Germany for a university education. When he returned to Turkey, he again wore the Galatasaray shirt and won two league championships with the team. Kılıç, who played 11 matches with the Turkey national football team, played for Galatasaray until 1953 except he played for Ankara Demirspor during his national service military obligation. His 5 goals against Beşiktaş JK are still a record for all 3 Istanbul derbies. His 5 goals were scored in the 43' (1-1), 58' (4-1), 73' (5-2), 76' (6-2) and 89' (9-2) minute.

The "Gündüz Kılıç Revolution" started early one morning at Galatasaray in 1952, when he hung his uniform in his locker and put on his coaching suit and whistle without looking back. Once the captain of the Galatasaray team, Gündüz Kılıç coached his former teammates and the bright young talents he added to the squad. He led his team to several championships after eighteen years without a championship between 1934 and 1952. He also transferred Turkish superstar Metin Oktay to the team.

Under Kılıç, Galatasaray reached quarter-finals of the European Cup, with the AC Milan side of Nereo Rocco ending their run.

Under his leadership, Galatasaray won Süper Lig championships, Turkish Cup titles, and competed in international matches.

His coaching style and strong communication skills were to be the backbone of Turkish coaching for many years to come.

The player, whose nickname was "Father", died in New York City, USA on 17 May 1980. His body was transferred to Istanbul and was interred at the Aşiyan Asri Cemetery.

== Honours ==
=== As player ===
- Galatasaray
  - Milli Küme: 1
    - 1938-1939
  - Istanbul Football League: 1
    - 1948-1949
  - Istanbul Futbol Kupası: 2
    - 1941-1942, 1942–1943

=== As manager ===
- Galatasaray
  - Istanbul Football League: 2
    - 1954-1955, 1955–1956
  - Süper Lig: 2
    - 1961-1962, 1962–1963
  - Turkish Cup: 3
    - 1962-1963, 1964–1965, 1965–1966
  - TFF Süper Kupa: 1
    - 1966
