= Şeref Stadium =

Football stadium in Istanbul, Turkey

- Interactive map of Şeref Stadium
- Full name: Şeref Stadium
- Location: Beşiktaş
- Owner: Beşiktaş J.K.
- Capacity: 6,000

Construction
- Built: 1933
- Demolished: 1987

Tenant
- Beşiktaş J.K.

Şeref Stadium was a football stadium in Beşiktaş, Istanbul, Turkey. It was named after Beşiktaş's former president Şeref Bey.
