= 1924–25 Galatasaray S.K. season =

Galatasaray
1924–25 season
- President: Ali Sami Yen (until 17 July 1925); Ahmet Robenson (5 September 1925); Ali Haydar Şekip
- Manager: Billy Hunter
- Stadium: Taksim Stadı
- Istanbul Lig: 1st
Home colours

The 1924–25 season was Galatasaray SK's 21st in existence and the club's 15th consecutive season in the Istanbul Football League.

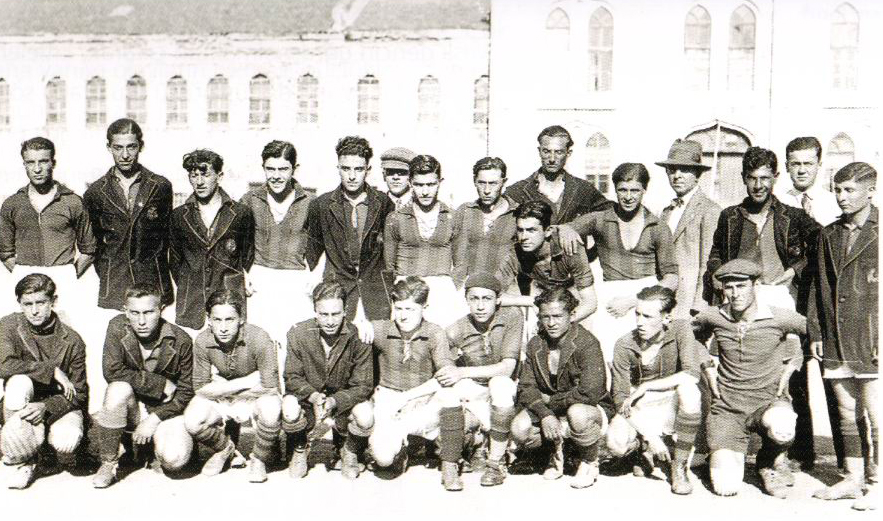
Istanbul League - Galatasaray SK 1924-25 Champion

== Squad statistics ==
No.	Pos.	Name	IFL		Total	
No.	Pos.	Name	Apps	Goals	Apps	Goals
-	GK	(Turkey) Ulvi Yenal	5	0	0	0
-	GK	(Turkey) Cahit	1	0	0	0
-	DF	(Turkey) Mehmet Nazif Gerçin	5	0	0	0
-	DF	(Turkey) Burhan Atak	2	0	0	0
-	DF	(Turkey) Kerim Özdor	4	0	0	0
-	DF	(Turkey) Müçteba Remzi	1	0	0	0
-	DF	(Turkey) Ali Gencay	3	0	0	0
-	MF	(Turkey) Kemal Rıfat Kalpakçıoğlu	6	0	0	0
-	MF	(Turkey) Nihat Bekdik (C)	6	0	0	0
-	MF	(Turkey) Hayri Cemil Gönen	4	0	0	0
-	MF	(Turkey) Kemal Nejat Kavur	3	0	0	0
-	MF	(Turkey) Suphi Batur	2	0	0	0
-	FW	(Turkey) Mehmet Leblebi	4	0	0	0
-	FW	(Turkey) Şadi Kavur	6	0	0	0
-	FW	(Turkey) Nesim Pinhas	2	0	0	0
-	FW	(Turkey) Mithat Ertuğ	4	0	0	0
-	FW	(Turkey) Muslihiddin Peykoğlu	5	0	0	0
-	FW	(Turkey) Edip Ossa	1	0	0	0
-	FW	(Turkey) Kemal Faruki	3	0	0	0

== Competitions ==
=== İstanbul Football League ===
1	Galatasaray SK	3–0	İdman Yurdu	Istanbul
		Regular Season		Stadium: Taksim Stadi; Referee: Abdullah Bey

1	Galatasaray SK	7–0	İkbaliye SK	Istanbul
		Regular Season		Stadium: Taksim Stadi; Referee: Abdullah Bey

1	Galatasaray SK	5–0	Yenişafak SK	Istanbul
		Regular Season		Stadium: Taksim Stadi; Referee: Abdullah Bey

1	Galatasaray SK	3–1	Hilal SK	Istanbul
		Regular Season		Stadium: Taksim Stadi; Referee: Abdullah Bey

==== Semifinals ====
Team 1	Score	Team 2
Galatasaray SK (Turkey)	6-1	(Turkey) Beşiktaş JK
Vefa SK (Turkey)	?	(Turkey) Üsküdar Anadolu SK

==== Final ====
Team 1	Score	Team 2
Galatasaray SK (Turkey)	4-0	(Turkey) Vefa SK

=== Friendly matches ===
Kick-off listed in local time (EEST)

12 June 1925, Friday

Galatasaray SK	0 – 1	Fenerbahçe SK
	Tayyare Cup	Zeki Rıza Sporel (78)

Taksim Stadı, Istanbul
Referee: Unknown

Galatasaray SK

Fenerbahçe SK

Galatasaray SK:
GK	1	(Turkey) Ulvi Yenal
RB	2	(Turkey) Ali Gencay
CB	3	(Turkey) Mehmet Nazif Gerçin
CB	4	(Turkey) Suphi Batur
LB	5	(Turkey) Nihat Bekdik(c)
RM	6	(Turkey) Mithat Ertuğ
CM	7	(Turkey) Mehmet Leblebi
CM	8	(Turkey) Kemal Rıfat Kalpakçıoğlu
CM	9	(Turkey) Kemal Faruki
CM	10	(Turkey) Şadi Kavur
CM	11	(Turkey) Kerim Özdor
Substitutes:
Manager:
(Scotland) Billy Hunter

Fenerbahçe SK:
GK	1	(Turkey) Şekip
RB	2	(Turkey) Kadri Göktulga
CB	3	(Turkey) Cafer
CB	4	(Turkey) Ragıp
LB	5	(Turkey) Fahir
RM	6	(Turkey) İsmet
CM	7	(Turkey) Alaeddin Baydar
CM	8	(Turkey) Muzaffer Çizer
LM	9	(Turkey) Zeki Rıza Sporel(c)
CF	10	(Turkey) Sabih
CF	11	(Turkey) Bedri Gürsoy
Substitutes:
Manager:
(Turkey) Hikmet Mocuk

Match officials

- Assistant referees:
  - Unknown
  - Unknown

Match rules

- 90 minutes
