= 1917–18 Galatasaray S.K. season =

Galatasaray
1917–18 season
- President: Ali Sami Yen
- Manager: Ali Sami Yen
- Stadium: Papazın Çayırı
- Istanbul Lig: 6th
Home colours

The 1917–18 season was Galatasaray SK's 13th in existence and the club's 9th consecutive season in the Istanbul Football League (IFL). During World War I, Galatasaray SK's players joined the Ottoman Army. Because of this, Galatasaray SK sometimes could not find any player, sometimes German soldiers merged Galatasaray SK to build a team. Nevertheless, they lost the matches by decision.

== Squad statistics ==
No.	Pos.	Name	IFL		Total	
No.	Pos.	Name	Apps	Goals	Apps	Goals
-	GK	(Turkey) Hachopulos	0	0	0	0
-	GK	(Germany) Karl Tzöllne	0	0	0	0
-	DF	(Turkey) Mehmet	0	0	0	0
-	MF	(Turkey) Ustrancalı Hüseyin	0	0	0	0
-	DF	(Germany) Maier	0	0	0	0
-	FW	(Turkey) Adnan	0	0	0	0
-	MF	(Turkey) Necip Şahin Erson	0	0	0	0
-	MF	(Turkey) Kemal	0	0	0	0
-	MF	(Turkey) Hikmet	0	0	0	0
-	FW	(Turkey) Namık Canko	0	0	0	0
-	FW	(Turkey) Hüseyin Eden	0	0	0	0
-	FW	(Turkey) Fazıl Safi Köprülü	0	0	0	0
-	FW	(Turkey) İsmet Uluğ	0	0	0	0
-	FW	(Ottoman Empire) Refik Osman Top	0	0	0	0
-	FW	(Ottoman Empire) Suphi Batur	0	0	0	0
-	FW	(Germany) Emil Oberle	0	0	0	0
-	FW	(Turkey) Sadi Karsan	0	0	0	0
-	FW	(Turkey) Eulleboam	0	0	0	0
-	FW	(Turkey) Sedat Ziya Kantoğlu	0	0	0	0
-	FW	(Turkey) Yusuf Ziya Öniş	0	0	0	0
-	FW	(Turkey) Tavşan Sadi	0	0	0	0
-	FW	(Turkey) İzzet	0	0	0	0
-	FW	(Turkey) Tahir	0	0	0	0
-	FW	(Turkey) Sadun	0	0	0	0
-	FW	(Turkey) Ahmet Ali	0	0	0	0
-	FW	(Germany) Unknown German Soldier	0	0	0	0
-	FW	(Germany) Unknown German Soldier	0	0	0	0

== Competitions ==
=== İstanbul Football League ===
==== Standings ====
Pos	Team	Pld	W	D	L	GF	GA	GD	Pts
1	Altınordu İdman Yurdu SK	10	9	0	1	23	9	+14	28
2	Fenerbahçe SK	10	6	1	3	31	10	+21	23
3	Küçükçekmece SK	10	?	?	?	?	?	—	22
4	Üsküdar Anadolu SK	10	?	?	?	?	?	—	16
5	Anadolu Hisarı İdman Yurdu SK	10	?	?	?	?	?	—	15
6	Galatasaray SK	10	3	0	7	10	6	+4	11

==== Matches ====
26 October 1917 1	Galatasaray SK	2–0	Anadolu Hisarı İdman Yurdu SK	Union Club Field, Istanbul
		(Report)		Referee: Unknown

23 November 1917 2	Galatasaray SK	2–1	Üsküdar Anadolu SK	Union Club Field, Istanbul
		(Report)		Referee: Unknown

21 December 1917 3	Galatasaray SK	3–2	Fenerbahçe SK	Union Club Field, Istanbul
		(Report)		Referee: Unknown

25 January 1917 4	Galatasaray SK	1–3	Küçükçekmece SK	Union Club Field, Istanbul
		(Report)		Referee: Unknown

1 February 1918 5	Galatasaray SK	0–1 awarded	Anadolu Hisarı İdman Yurdu SK	Union Club Field, Istanbul
		(Report)		Referee: Unknown

8 March 1918 6	Galatasaray SK	0–1 awarded	Üsküdar Anadolu SK	Union Club Field, Istanbul
		(Report)		Referee: Unknown

22 March 1918 7	Galatasaray SK	0–1 awarded	Altınordu İdman Yurdu SK	Union Club Field, Istanbul
		(Report)		Referee: Unknown

5 April 1918 8	Galatasaray SK	0–1 awarded	Küçükçekmece SK	Union Club Field, Istanbul
		(Report)		Referee: Unknown

12 April 1918 9	Galatasaray SK	0–1 awarded	Fenerbahçe SK	Union Club Field, Istanbul
		(Report)		Referee: Unknown

10 May 1918 10	Galatasaray SK	2–4	Altınordu İdman Yurdu SK	Union Club Field, Istanbul
		(Report)		Referee: Unknown

=== Friendly Matches ===
Kick-off listed in local time (EEST)
