= 1916–17 Galatasaray S.K. season =

Galatasaray
1916–17 season
- President: Ali Sami Yen
- Manager: Ali Sami Yen
- Stadium: Union Club Field
- Istanbul Lig: 5th
Home colours

The 1916–17 season was Galatasaray SK's 12th in existence and the club's 8th consecutive season in the IFL.

== Squad statistics ==
No.	Pos.	Name	IFL		Total	
No.	Pos.	Name	Apps	Goals	Apps	Goals
-	GK	(Turkey) İzzet	0	0	0	0
-	GK	(Turkey) Orhan	0	0	0	0
-	DF	(Turkey) Ahmet Ali	0	0	0	0
-	MF	(Turkey) Vehbi	0	0	0	0
-	DF	(Ottoman Empire) Sadi Karsan	0	0	0	0
-	FW	(Turkey) Afif	0	0	0	0
-	MF	(Turkey) Necip Şahin Erson	0	0	0	0
-	MF	(Turkey) Müfit	0	0	0	0
-	MF	(Turkey) Hikmet	0	0	0	0
-	FW	(Turkey) Namık Canko	0	0	0	0
-	FW	(Turkey) Hüseyin Eden	0	0	0	0
-	FW	(Turkey) Fazıl Safi Köprülü	0	0	0	0
-	FW	(Turkey) İsmet Uluğ	0	0	0	0
-	FW	(Ottoman Empire) Refik Osman Top	0	0	0	0
-	FW	(Ottoman Empire) Suphi Batur	0	0	0	0
-	FW	(Germany) Emil Oberle	0	0	0	0
-	FW	(Turkey) Sadi Karsan	0	0	0	0
-	FW	(Turkey) Selami İzzet Sedes	0	0	0	0
-	FW	(Turkey) Siret	0	0	0	0
-	FW	(Turkey) Kamil	0	0	0	0
-	FW	(Turkey) Hilmi	0	0	0	0

== Competitions ==
=== İstanbul Football League ===
==== Standings ====
Pos	Team	Pld	W	D	L	GF	GA	GD	Pts
2	Üsküdar Anadolu SK	9	6	0	3	?	?	—	21
3	Fenerbahçe SK	9	3	2	4	19	13	+6	17
4	Küçükçekmece SK	9	4	0	5	?	?	—	17
5	Galatasaray SK	9	3	0	6	16	26	−10	15
6	Anadolu Hisarı İdman Yurdu SK	5	0	1	4	?	?	—	6

==== Matches ====
December 22, 1916

Galatasaray SK	1 – 4	Fenerbahçe SK
	[(Report)]	Sait Selahattin(2), Zeki Rıza Sporel, Konstantin

Union Club Field, Istanbul
Referee: Unknown

Galatasaray SK	2 – 1	Üsküdar Anadolu SK
	[(Report)]

Union Club Field, Istanbul
Referee: Unknown

Galatasaray SK	1 – 2	Üsküdar Anadolu SK
	[(Report)]

Union Club Field, Istanbul
Referee: Unknown

Galatasaray SK	0 – 2	Altınordu İdman Yurdu SK

Union Club Field, Istanbul
Referee: Unknown

Galatasaray SK	0 – 6	Altınordu İdman Yurdu SK
	[(Report)]

Union Club Field, Istanbul
Referee: Unknown

Galatasaray SK	2 – 1	Anadolu Hisarı İdman Yurdu SK
	Won by decision

Union Club Field, Istanbul
Referee: Unknown

Galatasaray SK	7 – 3	Küçükçekmece SK
	[(Report)]

Union Club Field, Istanbul
Referee: Unknown

Galatasaray SK	1 – 4	Küçükçekmece SK
	[(Report)]

Union Club Field, Istanbul
Referee: Unknown

April 6, 1917

Galatasaray SK	2 – 3	Fenerbahçe SK
	[(Report)]	Sait Selahattin, Zeki Rıza Sporel, Konstantin

Union Club Field, Istanbul
Referee: Unknown

=== Friendly Matches ===
Kick-off listed in local time (EEST)
