= 1915–16 Galatasaray S.K. season =

Galatasaray
1915–16 season
- President: Ali Sami Yen
- Manager: Ali Sami Yen
- Stadium: Union Club Field
- Istanbul Lig: 1st
Home colours

The 1915–16 season was Galatasaray SK's 12th in existence and the club's 8th consecutive season in the IFL.

== Squad statistics ==
No.	Pos.	Name	IFL		Total	
No.	Pos.	Name	Apps	Goals	Apps	Goals
-	GK	(Turkey) İzzet	0	0	0	0
-	GK	(Turkey) Hamdi Dardağan	0	0	0	0
-	DF	(Turkey) Ali Müsait	0	0	0	0
-	MF	(Turkey) Adnan İbrahim Pirioğlu	0	0	0	0
-	DF	(Ottoman Empire) Sadi Karsan	0	0	0	0
-	FW	(Turkey) Sedat Ziya Kantoğlu	0	0	0	0
-	MF	(Turkey) Necip Şahin Erson	0	0	0	0
-	MF	(Turkey) Hayati	0	0	0	0
-	MF	(Turkey) Sabit Cinol	0	0	0	0
-	FW	(Turkey) Namık Canko	0	0	0	0
-	FW	(Germany) Hüseyin Eden	0	0	0	0
-	FW	(Turkey) Fazıl Safi Köprülü	0	0	0	0
-	FW	(Turkey) Yusuf Ziya Öniş	0	0	0	0
-	FW	(Ottoman Empire) Refik Osman Top	0	0	0	0
-	FW	(Ottoman Empire) Muzaffer Kazancı	0	0	0	0
-	FW	(Germany) Emil Oberle	0	0	0	0
-	FW	(Romania) Zean Bibescu	0	0	0	0
-	FW	(Turkey) Selami İzzet Sedes	0	0	0	0

== Competitions ==
=== İstanbul Football League ===
==== Standings ====
Pos	Team	Pld	W	D	L	GF	GA	GD	Pts
1	Galatasaray	10	7	2	1	31	12	+19	25 (Note: Galatasaray apparently forfeited the match they lost.)
2	Fenerbahçe SK	10	6	2	2	36	10	+26	24
3	Altınordu İdman Yurdu SK	0	?	?	?	?	?	—	0
4	Üsküdar Anadolu SK	0	?	?	?	?	?	—	0
5	Küçükçekmece SK	0	?	?	?	?	?	—	0
6	Anadolu Hisarı İdman Yurdu SK	0	?	?	?	?	?	—	0

==== Matches ====
February 11, 1916

Galatasaray SK	1 – 3	Fenerbahçe SK
	[(Report)]	Sait Selahattin Cihanoğlu(2), Galip Kulaksızoğlu

Union Club Field, Istanbul
Referee: Unknown

Galatasaray SK	4 – 0	Üsküdar Anadolu SK
	[(Report)]

Union Club Field, Istanbul
Referee: Unknown

Galatasaray SK	1 – 1	Üsküdar Anadolu SK
	[(Report)]

Union Club Field, Istanbul
Referee: Unknown

Galatasaray SK	2 – 0	Altınordu İdman Yurdu SK
	[(Report)]

Union Club Field, Istanbul
Referee: Unknown

Galatasaray SK	5 – 0	Altınordu İdman Yurdu SK
	[(Report)]

Union Club Field, Istanbul
Referee: Unknown

Galatasaray SK	5 – 2	Anadolu Hisarı İdman Yurdu SK
	[(Report)]

Union Club Field, Istanbul
Referee: Unknown

Galatasaray SK	3 – 2	Küçükçekmece SK
	[(Report)]

Union Club Field, Istanbul
Referee: Unknown

Galatasaray SK	5 – 2	Küçükçekmece SK
	[(Report)]

Union Club Field, Istanbul
Referee: Unknown

March 3, 1916

Galatasaray SK	2 – 2	Fenerbahçe SK
	[(Report)]	Galip Kulaksızoğlu, Hikmet Topuz

Union Club Field, Istanbul
Referee: Unknown

=== Fukaraperver Hanımlar Cemiyeti Kupası ===
Kick-off listed in local time (EEST)

1916

Galatasaray SK B Team	2 – 1	Fenerbahçe SK
	[Galatasaray B Team won the cup. (Report)]

Union Club Field, Istanbul
Referee: Unknown
