= 1923–24 Galatasaray S.K. season =

Galatasaray
1923–24 season
- President: Yusuf Ziya Öniş
- Manager: Adil Giray
- Stadium: Taksim Stadı
- Istanbul Lig: 2nd
Home colours	Away colours

The 1923–24 season was Galatasaray SK's 20th in existence and the club's 14th consecutive season in the Istanbul Football League.

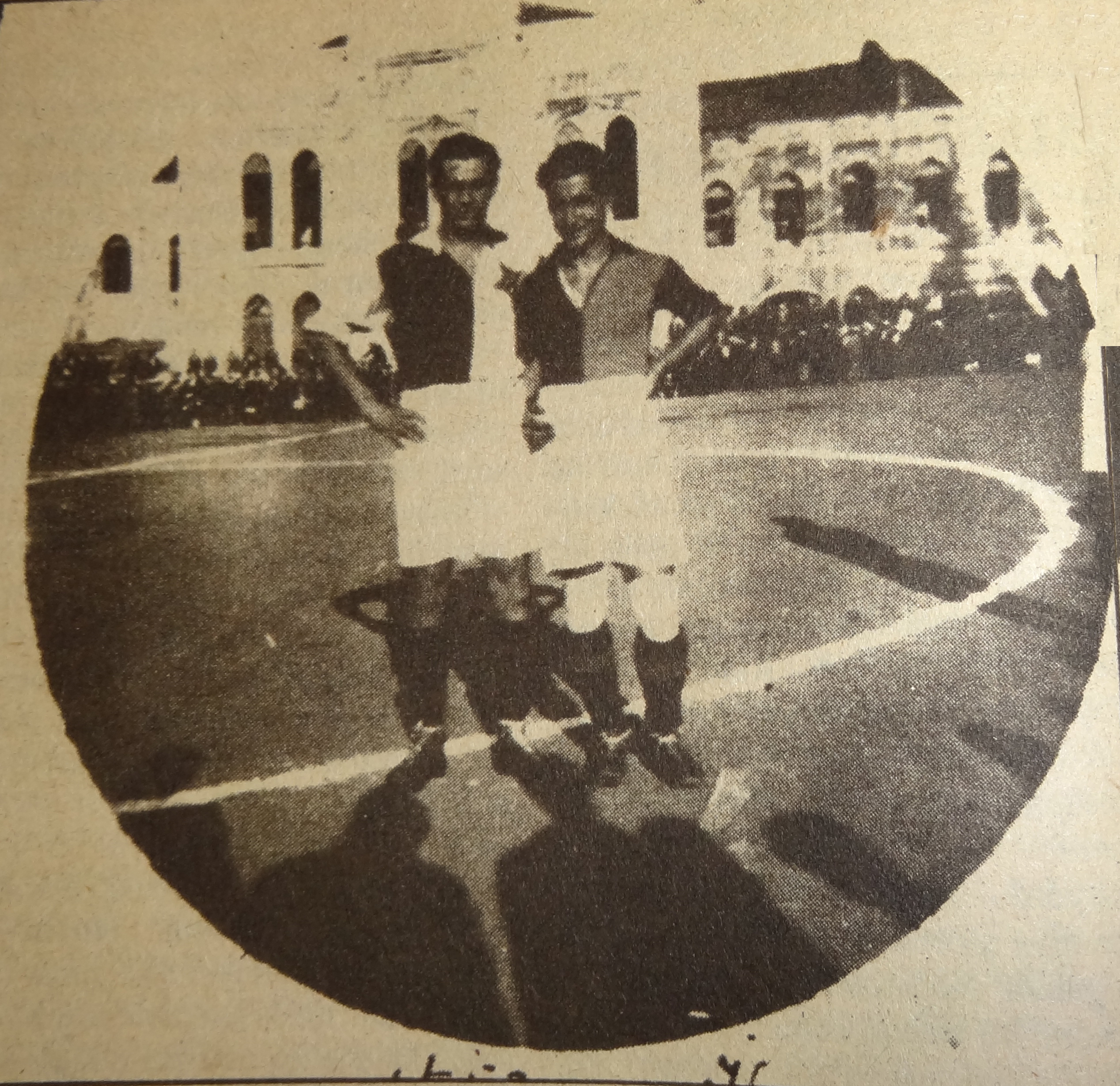
Nihat Bekdik and Slavia Prague Captain

== Squad statistics ==
No.	Pos.	Name	IFL		Total	
No.	Pos.	Name	Apps	Goals	Apps	Goals
-	GK	(Turkey) Nüzhet Abbas Öniş	5	0	5	0
-	GK	(Turkey) Adil Giray (C)	2	0	2	0
-	GK	(Turkey) Ulvi Yenal	4	0	4	0
-	DF	(Turkey) A. Cevat	1	0	1	0
-	DF	(Turkey) Ali Gencay	11	0	11	0
-	DF	(Turkey) Kerim Özdor	5	0	5	0
-	DF	(Turkey) Şinazi Özdemir	1	0	1	0
-	DF	(Turkey) Mehmet Nazif Gerçin	5	0	5	0
-	DF	(Turkey) Hayri Cemil Gönen	10	0	10	0
-	MF	(Turkey) Kemal Rıfat Kalpakçıoğlu	8	0	8	0
-	MF	(Turkey) Suat Subay	1	0	1	0
-	MF	(Turkey) Nihat Bekdik	10	0	10	0
-	MF	(Turkey) Arif Soydan	1	0	1	0
-	MF	(Turkey) Edip Ossa	2	0	2	0
-	MF	(Turkey) Firuz İrfan	7	0	7	0
-	MF	(Turkey) Necip Şahin Erson	9	0	9	0
-	FW	(Turkey) Muslihiddin Peykoğlu	10	0	10	0
-	FW	(Turkey) Kemal Nejat Kavur	2	0	2	0
-	FW	(Turkey) Mehmet Leblebi	6	0	6	0
-	FW	(Turkey) Bellaşa	1	0	1	0
-	FW	(Turkey) Nesim Pinhas	2	0	2	0
-	FW	(Turkey) Mithat Ertuğ	4	0	4	0
-	FW	(Turkey) Raif	1	0	1	0
-	FW	(Turkey) Necdet	1	0	1	0
-	FW	(Turkey) Ekrem	1	0	1	0
-	FW	(Turkey) Fehmi	1	0	1	0

== Competitions ==
=== İstanbul Football League ===
==== Semifinals ====
Team 1	Score	Team 2
Fenerbahçe SK (Turkey)	2-3	(Turkey) Galatasaray SK
Beşiktaş JK (Turkey)	3-1	(Turkey) Küçükçekmece SK

==== Final ====
Team 1	Score	Team 2
Beşiktaş JK (Turkey)	2-0	(Turkey) Galatasaray SK

==== Group matches ====
Kick-off listed in local time (EEST)

2 November 1923	Fenerbahçe SK	4–0	Galatasaray SK	Istanbul
				Stadium: İttihat Spor Field

7 March 1924	Galatasaray SK	2–0	Fenerbahçe SK	Istanbul
				Stadium: Taksim Stadi

Galatasaray SK	6–1	Vefa SK	Istanbul
			Stadium: Taksim Stadi

Vefa SK	0–2	Galatasaray SK	Istanbul
			Stadium: Taksim Stadi

Galatasaray SK	6–4	Küçükçekmece SK	Istanbul
			Stadium: Taksim Stadi

Küçükçekmece SK	1–0	Galatasaray SK	Istanbul
			Stadium: Taksim Stadi

Galatasaray SK	11–2	Hilal SK	Istanbul
			Stadium: Taksim Stadi

==== Knockout phase ====
Kick-off listed in local time (EEST)

1924 1/8 Final	Galatasaray SK	6–0	Yenişafak SK	Istanbul
				Stadium: Taksim Stadium

1924 1/4 Final	Galatasaray SK	3–0	Altınordu İdman Yurdu SK	Istanbul
	awarded 3-0			Stadium: Taksim Stadium

15 August 1924 1/2 Final	Galatasaray SK	3–2	Fenerbahçe SK	Istanbul
	Nihat (?); Mehmet (?)p Mithat (?)p		Zeki Rıza (?)p Şekip Kulaksızoğlu (red card)	Stadium: Taksim Stadium; Referee: Hachopulos

22 August 1924 Final	Galatasaray SK	0–2	Beşiktaş JK	Istanbul
			Refik (?); Edip (?)	Stadium: Taksim Stadium

=== Friendly matches ===
23 March 1923, Friday Friendly Match	Galatasaray SK	0–5	HŠK Građanski Zagreb	Istanbul
				Stadium: Taksim Stadium

13 July 1923, Friday Friendly Match	Galatasaray SK	1–7	Slavia Prague	Istanbul
				Stadium: Taksim Stadium

12 September 1923, Friday Friendly Match	Galatasaray SK	2–2	Poland national football team	Istanbul
				Stadium: Taksim Stadium

28 October 1923, Sunday Friendly Match	Galatasaray SK	3–2	Bucharest Team	Istanbul
	Nihat Bekdik 25'; Necip Şahin Erson 34'; Firuz İrfan 89'	(Report)	Charles Köhler 15', 60'	Stadium: Taksim Stadium; Referee: Costel Radulescu

7 December 1923, Friday Friendly Match	Galatasaray SK	2–2	SK Moravská Slavia Brno	Istanbul
				Stadium: Taksim Stadium

28 December 1923, Friday Friendly Match	Galatasaray SK	1–1	Ferencvárosi TC	Istanbul
				Stadium: Taksim Stadium

1923 Türkiye İdman ve Spor Alemi Mecmuaları Kupası	Galatasaray SK	0–1	Fenerbahçe SK	Istanbul
		Lost by decision
