= 1914–15 Galatasaray S.K. season =

Galatasaray
1914–15 season
- President: Ali Sami Yen
- Manager: Sadi Bey
- Stadium: Papazın Çayırı
- Istanbul Lig: 1st
Home colours

The 1914–15 season was Galatasaray SK's 11th in existence and the club's 7th consecutive season in the IFL.

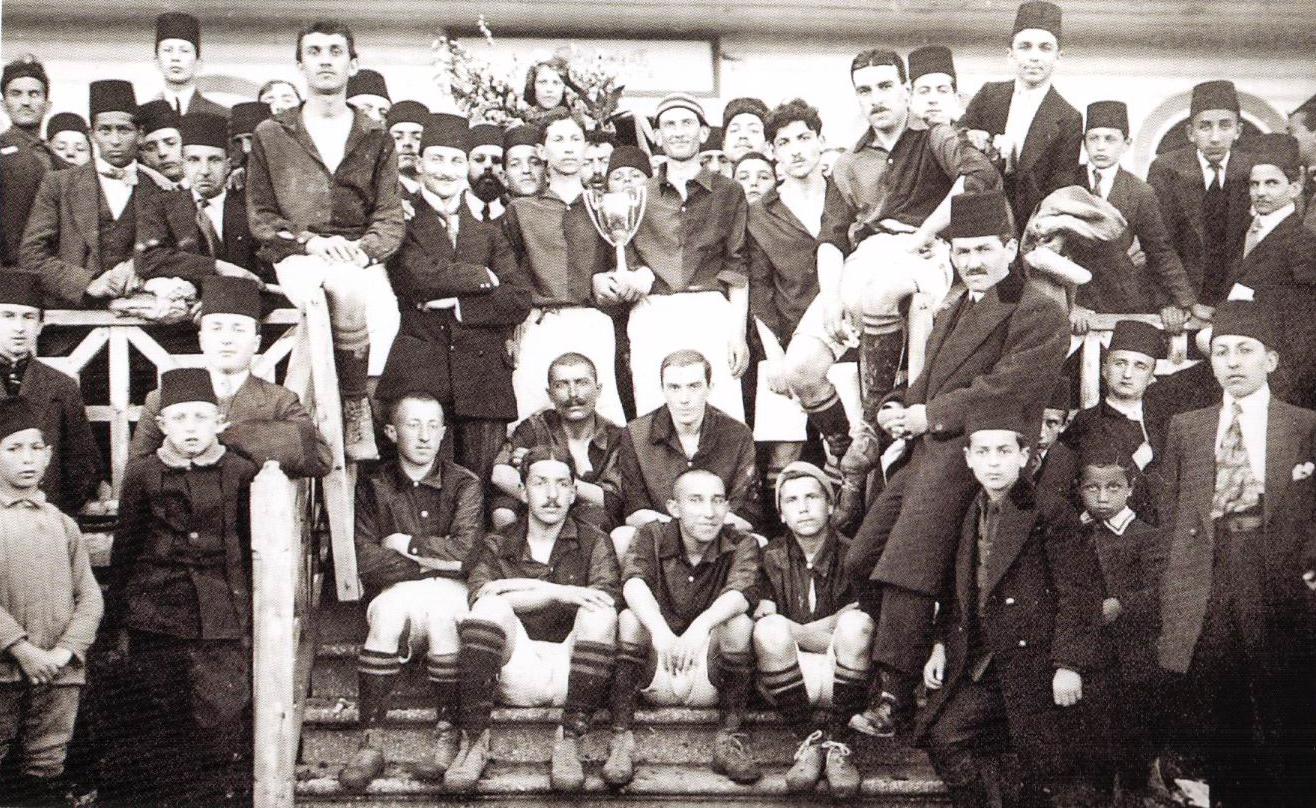
Istanbul Friday League - Galatasaray SK 1914-15 Champion

== Squad statistics ==
No.	Pos.	Name	IFL		Total	
No.	Pos.	Name	Apps	Goals	Apps	Goals
-	GK	(Turkey) Ahmet Ali	0	0	0	0
-	GK	(Turkey) Hamdi Dardağan	0	0	0	0
-	DF	(Turkey) Ustrumcalı Hüseyin	0	0	0	0
-	MF	(Turkey) Kürt Mehmet	0	0	0	0
-	DF	(Ottoman Empire) Ahmet Cevat	0	0	0	0
-	FW	(Turkey) Sedat Ziya Kantoğlu	0	0	0	0
-	MF	(Turkey) İzzet	0	0	0	0
-	MF	(Turkey) Bekir Sıtkı Bircan	0	0	0	0
-	MF	(Turkey) Celal İbrahim	0	0	0	0
-	FW	(Turkey) Nami	0	0	0	0
-	FW	(German Empire) Daniş	0	0	0	0
-	FW	(Turkey) Fazıl Safi Köprülü	0	0	0	0
-	FW	(Turkey) Yusuf Ziya Öniş	0	0	0	0
-	FW	(Ottoman Empire) Hasnun Galip	0	0	0	0
-	FW	(Ottoman Empire) Muzaffer Kazancı	0	0	0	0
-	FW	(German Empire) Emil Oberle	0	0	0	0
-	FW	(Kingdom of Romania) Zean Bibescu	0	0	0	0
-	FW	(Turkey) Selami İzzet Sedes	0	0	0	0

== Competitions ==
=== İstanbul Football League ===
==== Standings ====
Pos	Team	Pld	W	D	L	GF	GA	GD	Pts
1	Galatasaray SK	7	5	0	2	36	11	+25	10
2	Üsküdar Anadolu	7	?	?	?	?	?	—	10
3	Anadolu İdman Yurdu	0	?	?	?	?	?	—	0
4	Altınordu	0	?	?	?	?	?	—	0
5	Küçükçekmece SK	0	?	?	?	?	?	—	0

==== Matches ====
Galatasaray SK	14 – 1	Üsküdar Anadolu SK

Union Club Field, Istanbul
Referee: Unknown

Galatasaray SK	1 – 4	Üsküdar Anadolu SK

Union Club Field, Istanbul
Referee: Unknown

Galatasaray SK	3 – 1	Altınordu İdman Yurdu SK

Union Club Field, Istanbul
Referee: Unknown

Galatasaray SK	3 – 0	Altınordu İdman Yurdu SK

Union Club Field, Istanbul
Referee: Unknown

Galatasaray SK	6 – 0	Anadolu Hisarı İdman Yurdu SK

Union Club Field, Istanbul
Referee: Unknown

Galatasaray SK	5 – 0	Anadolu Hisarı İdman Yurdu SK

Union Club Field, Istanbul
Referee: Unknown

Galatasaray SK	4 – 5	Küçükçekmece SK

Union Club Field, Istanbul
Referee: Unknown

==== Final Match ====
Kick-off listed in local time (EEST)

Galatasaray SK	3 – 2	Üsküdar Anadolu SK
	[(Report)]

Union Club Field, Istanbul
Referee: Unknown

=== Friendly Matches ===
Kick-off listed in local time (EEST)

October 2, 1914

Galatasaray SK	6 – 1	Fenerbahçe SK
Yusuf Ziya Öniş(2), Hasnun Galip, ?	[(Report)]

Union Club Field, Istanbul
Referee: Unknown

February 19, 1915

Galatasaray SK	0 – 4	Fenerbahçe SK
	[(Report)]

Union Club Field, Istanbul
Referee: Unknown
