= 1928–29 Galatasaray S.K. season =

Galatasaray
1928–29 season
- President: (Turkey) Necmettin Sadık Sadak
- Manager: (Scotland) Billy Hunter (until End 1928) (Turkey) Nihat Bekdik
- Stadium: Taksim Stadı
- Istanbul Lig: 1st
- Top goalscorer: League: Kemal Faruki (8); All: Kemal Faruki (8)
Home colours

The 1928–29 season was Galatasaray SK's 25th in existence and the club's 18th consecutive season in the Istanbul Football League.

== Squad statistics ==
No.	Pos.	Name	IFL		Total	
No.	Pos.	Name	Apps	Goals	Apps	Goals
-	GK	(Turkey) Rasim Atala	9	0	9	0
-	GK	(Turkey) Ulvi Yenal	1	0	1	0
-	DF	(Turkey) Mehmet Nazif Gerçin	10	0	10	0
-	DF	(Turkey) Burhan Atak	10	1	10	1
-	MF	(Turkey) Nihat Bekdik (C)	10	2	10	2
-	MF	(Turkey) Mithat Ertuğ	10	1	10	1
-	MF	(Turkey) Suphi Batur	7	0	7	0
-	MF	(Turkey) Muammer Çakınay	3	0	3	0
-	FW	(Turkey) Mehmet Leblebi	10	6	10	6
-	FW	(Turkey) Kemal Faruki	10	8	10	8
-	FW	(Turkey) Latif Yalınlı	8	7	8	7
-	FW	(Turkey) Kemal Şefik	7	1	7	1
-	FW	(Turkey) Rebii Erkal	5	1	5	1
-	FW	(Turkey) Necdet Cici	5	1	5	1
-	FW	(Turkey) Sacit Haydar	3	0	3	0
-	FW	(Turkey) Muslihiddin Peykoğlu	2	1	2	1
-	FW	(Turkey) Rıfat Alper	1	0	1	0
-	FW	(Turkey) Asım Bey	1	0	1	0
-	FW	(Turkey) Şadlı	1	0	1	0
-	FW	(Turkey) Vahyi Oktay	1	0	1	0

== Squad changes for the 1928–29 season ==
In: Note: Flags indicate national team as defined under FIFA eligibility rules; some limited exceptions apply. Players may hold more than one non-FIFA nationality.

No.	Pos.	Nation	Player
-		TUR	Muammer Çakınay (from Galatasaray High School)
-		TUR	Asım Bey (from Galatasaray High School)
-		TUR	Sacit Haydar (from Galatasaray High School)
-		TUR	Kemal Şefik (from Galatasaray High School)
-		TUR	Şadlı (from Galatasaray High School)
-		TUR	Rıfat Alper (from Galatasaray High School)
-		TUR	Latif Yalınlı (from Küçükçekmece SK)
-		TUR	Vahyi Oktay (from İzmirspor)

== Competitions ==
=== Istanbul Football League ===
==== Standings ====
Pos	Team	Pld	W	D	L	GF	GA	GD	Pts
1	Galatasaray SK	10	8	2	0	29	11	+18	28
2	Fenerbahçe SK	10	7	0	3	31	16	+15	24
3	Beşiktaş JK	10	4	3	3	29	20	+9	21
4	Vefa SK	10	2	4	4	14	16	−2	18
5	Beykoz 1908 S.K.D.	10	3	1	6	13	26	−13	17
6	Küçükçekmece SK	10	1	0	9	10	37	−27	12

==== Matches ====
Kick-off listed in local time (EEST)

21 September 1928 1	Galatasaray SK	4–3	Beşiktaş JK	Istanbul
	Kemal Faruki 65'; Latif 72', 79', 88'	(Report)	Şükrü 22'; Hayati 66', 84'	Stadium: Taksim Stadi; Referee: Abdullah Bey

28 September 1928 2	Vefa SK	1–1	Galatasaray SK	Istanbul
	?	(Report)	Kemal	Stadium: Taksim Stadi; Referee: Ahmet Şerafettin Bey

19 October 1928 3	Galatasaray SK	1–0	Beykoz 1908 S.K.D.	Istanbul
	Mehmet 31'	(Report)		Stadium: Taksim Stadi; Referee: Necmettin Çakar

9 November 1928 4	Küçükçekmece SK	2–4	Galatasaray SK	Istanbul
	?	(Report)	Rebii, Mehmet, Kemal, Muslih	Stadium: Taksim Stadi

16 November 1928 5	Galatasaray SK	2–0	Fenerbahçe SK	Istanbul
	Kemal 1', 21'	(Report)		Stadium: Taksim Stadi; Referee: Ahmet Şerafettin Bey

19 April 1929 6	Beşiktaş JK	1–2	Galatasaray SK	Istanbul
	Eşref 57'	(Report)	Latif 24'; Kemal 82'	Stadium: Taksim Stadi; Referee: Abdullah Bey

26 April 1929 7	Beykoz 1908 S.K.D.	0–5	Galatasaray SK	Istanbul
		(Report)	Necdet 4'; Latif 36', 85'; Mehmet 61'; Kemal 78'	Stadium: Taksim Stadi; Referee: Necmettin Çakar

3 May 1929 8	Galatasaray SK	0–0	Vefa SK	Istanbul
		(Report)		Stadium: Taksim Stadi

10 May 1929 9	Fenerbahçe SK	1–2	Galatasaray SK	Istanbul
	Alaaddin 44'	(Report)	Nihat 25'; Latif 87'	Stadium: Taksim Stadi; Referee: Necmettin Çakar

24 May 1929 10	Galatasaray SK	8–3	Küçükçekmece SK	Istanbul
	Mehmet (3x), Latif(2x), Burhan, Kemal, Mithat	First Half 1-3 (Report)	?	Stadium: Taksim Stadi

=== Gazi Büstü ===
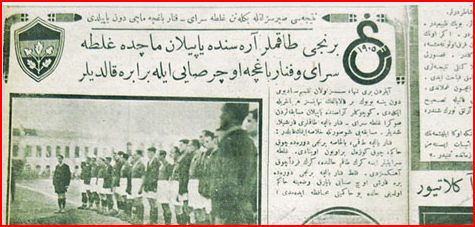
First match in the newspaper

Gazi Büstü Tournament was a football tournament between Fenerbahçe SK and Galatasaray SK to promote Tayyare Cemiyeti. The winner of this tournament was awarded with an Atatürk bust which was very important. This statue was the first and last thing that was in the name of Atatürk when he was alive.

Kick-off listed in local time (EEST)

10 August 1928
17:00

Galatasaray SK	3 – 3	Fenerbahçe SK
Kemal Şefik(25); Muslihiddin Peykoğlu(73); Mehmet Leblebi (82)	First match(Report)	Alaeddin Baydar (15); Fikret Arıcan (30); Sadi Çoban(43)

Taksim Stadı, Istanbul
Referee: Unknown

Galatasaray SK

Fenerbahçe SK

Galatasaray SK:
GK	1	(Turkey) Ulvi Yenal
RB	2	(Turkey) Burhan Atak
CB	3	(Turkey) Mehmet Nazif Gerçin
CB	4	(Turkey) Suphi Batur
LB	5	(Turkey) Nihat Bekdik(c)
RM	6	(Turkey) Mithat Ertuğ
CM	7	(Turkey) Mehmet Leblebi
CM	8	(Turkey) Muslihiddin Peykoğlu
CM	9	(Turkey) Kemal Faruki
CM	10	(Turkey) Latif Yalınlı
CM	11	(Turkey) Rebii Erkal
Substitutes:
Manager:
(Scotland) Billy Hunter

Fenerbahçe SK:
GK	1	(Turkey) Fehmi
RB	2	(Turkey) Kadri Göktulga
CB	3	(Turkey) Sabih Arca
CB	4	(Turkey) Cevat Seyit
LB	5	(Turkey) Sadi Çoban
RM	6	(Turkey) İsmet
CM	7	(Turkey) Alaeddin Baydar
CM	8	(Turkey) Muzaffer Çizer
LM	9	(Turkey) Zeki Rıza Sporel(c)
CF	10	(Turkey) Fikret Arıcan
CF	11	(Turkey) Bedri Gürsoy
Substitutes:
Manager:
(Turkey) Hikmet Mocuk

Match officials

- Assistant referees:
  - Unknown
  - Unknown

Match rules

- 90 minutes

31 August 1928
17:00

Galatasaray SK	4 – 0	Fenerbahçe SK
Necdet Cici(15)(80)(88); Şadlı Alioğlu(60)	Second match(Report)

Taksim Stadı, Istanbul
Referee: Unknown

Galatasaray SK

Fenerbahçe SK

Galatasaray SK:
GK	1	(Turkey) Ulvi Yenal
RB	2	(Turkey) Burhan Atak
CB	3	(Turkey) Mehmet Nazif Gerçin
CB	4	(Turkey) Suphi Batur
LB	5	(Turkey) Nihat Bekdik(c)
RM	6	(Turkey) Mithat Ertuğ
CM	7	(Turkey) Mehmet Leblebi
CM	8	(Turkey) Şadlı Alioğlu
CM	9	(Turkey) Kemal Faruki
CM	10	(Turkey) Necdet Cici
CM	11	(Turkey) Muslihiddin Peykoğlu
Substitutes:
Manager:
(Scotland) Billy Hunter

Fenerbahçe SK:
GK	1	(Turkey) Fehmi
RB	2	(Turkey) Kadri Göktulga
CB	3	(Turkey) Fürüzan Şansal
CB	4	(Turkey) Cevat Seyit
LB	5	(Turkey) Sadi Çoban
RM	6	(Turkey) İsmet
CM	7	(Turkey) Alaeddin Baydar
CM	8	(Turkey) Muzaffer Çizer
LM	9	(Turkey) Zeki Rıza Sporel(c)
CF	10	(Turkey) Fikret Arıcan
CF	11	(Turkey) Bedri Gürsoy
Substitutes:
Manager:
(Turkey) Hikmet Mocuk

Match officials

- Assistant referees:
  - Unknown
  - Unknown

Match rules

- 90 minutes

== Friendly matches ==
25 November 1928 Friendly Game	Galatasaray SK	20–0	Vefa SK	Istanbul
	Mehmet Leblebi (?) ??????			Stadium: Taksim Stadium

May 17, 1929 Friendly Game	Galatasaray SK	1–3	FK Austria Wien	Istanbul
	Şadli Alioğlu (?)			Stadium: Taksim Stadium
