= 1921–22 Galatasaray S.K. season =

Galatasaray
1921–1922 season
- President: Refik Cevdet Kalpakçıoğlu
- Manager: Adil Giray
- Stadium: Taksim Stadı
- Istanbul Football League: 1st
| Home colours | Away colours |

The 1921–22 season was Galatasaray SK's 18th in existence and the club's 12th consecutive season in the Istanbul Football League.

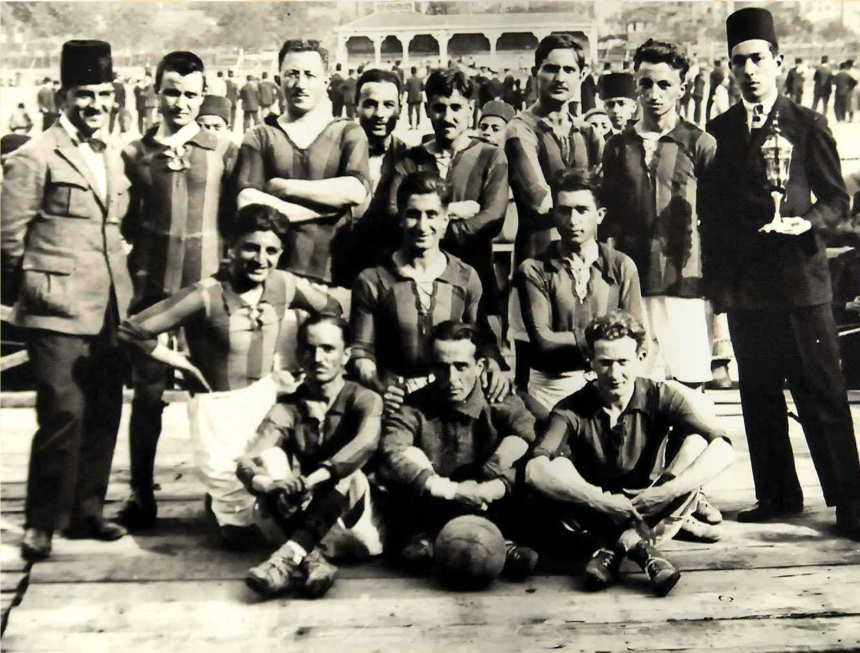
Istanbul Friday League - Galatasaray SK 1921-22 Champion

== Squad statistics ==
| No. | Pos. | Name | IFL | | Total | |
| No. | Pos. | Name | Apps | Goals | Apps | Goals |
|---|---|---|---|---|---|---|
| - | GK | (Turkey) Nüzhet Abbas Öniş | 10 | 0 | 10 | 0 |
| - | GK | (Turkey) Adil Giray (C) | 0 | 0 | 0 | 0 |
| - | DF | (Turkey) Ahmet Cevat Baydar | 1 | 0 | 1 | 0 |
| - | DF | (Turkey) Mehmet Nazif Gerçin | 10 | 0 | 10 | 0 |
| - | DF | (Turkey) Siret Şevket Ekmekçioğlu | 5 | 0 | 5 | 0 |
| - | DF | (Turkey) Kamil Ethem | 2 | 0 | 2 | 0 |
| - | DF | (Turkey) Nusret Toysal | 3 | 0 | 3 | 0 |
| - | DF | (Turkey) Namık Canko | 1 | 0 | 1 | 0 |
| - | MF | (Turkey) Nihat Bekdik | 9 | 0 | 9 | 0 |
| - | MF | (Turkey) Müçteba Remzi | 3 | 0 | 3 | 0 |
| - | MF | (Turkey) Edip Ossa | 10 | 0 | 10 | 0 |
| - | MF | (Turkey) Burhan Atak | 1 | 0 | 1 | 0 |
| - | MF | (Turkey) Sadi Hasan | 5 | 0 | 5 | 0 |
| - | MF | (Turkey) Bellaşa | 2 | 0 | 2 | 0 |
| - | FW | (Turkey) Selahattin Sadıkoğlu | 10 | 0 | 10 | 0 |
| - | FW | (Turkey) Fazıl Köprülü | 9 | 0 | 9 | 0 |
| - | FW | (Turkey) Necip Şahin Erson | 9 | 0 | 9 | 0 |
| - | FW | (Turkey) Suat Subay | 10 | 0 | 10 | 0 |
| - | FW | (Turkey) Sadi Karsan | 4 | 0 | 4 | 0 |
| - | FW | (Turkey) Sadi Kurt | 1 | 0 | 1 | 0 |
| - | FW | (Turkey) Kemal Nejat Kavur | 7 | 0 | 7 | 0 |
| - | FW | (Turkey) Muslihiddin Peykoğlu | 2 | 0 | 2 | 0 |
| - | FW | (Turkey) Münif | 1 | 0 | 1 | 0 |
| - | FW | (Turkey) Nusret | 1 | 0 | 1 | 0 |
| - | FW | (Turkey) Bekir Refet Teker | 1 | 0 | 1 | 0 |

== Competitions ==
=== İstanbul Football League ===
==== Standings ====
| Pos | Team | Pld | W | D | L | GF | GA | GD | Pts |
|---|---|---|---|---|---|---|---|---|---|
| 1 | Galatasaray SK | 10 | 9 | 0 | 1 | 44 | 10 | +34 | 18 |
| 2 | Fenerbahçe SK | 10 | 8 | 0 | 2 | 45 | 11 | +34 | 16 |
| 3 | Vefa SK | 9 | 4 | 3 | 2 | 12 | 13 | −1 | 11 |
| 4 | Darüşşafaka SK | 9 | 4 | 2 | 3 | 16 | 12 | +4 | 10 |
| 5 | Üsküdar Anadolu SK | 10 | 3 | 4 | 3 | 12 | 12 | 0 | 10 |
| 6 | Küçükçekmece SK | 8 | 4 | 1 | 3 | 22 | 19 | +3 | 9 |
| 7 | Altınordu İdman Yurdu SK | 8 | 3 | 1 | 4 | 13 | 16 | −3 | 7 |
| 8 | Hilal SK | 9 | 2 | 1 | 6 | 9 | 14 | −5 | 5 |
| 9 | Beylerbeyi SK | 8 | 2 | 0 | 6 | 9 | 26 | −17 | 4 |
| 10 | Türk Gücü SK | 5 | 0 | 1 | 4 | 4 | 25 | −21 | 1 |
| 11 | Kumkapı SK | 6 | 0 | 1 | 5 | 1 | 29 | −28 | 1 |

==== Matches ====
| 4 November 1921 1 | Galatasaray SK | 5–1 | Fenerbahçe SK | Istanbul |
| | Fazıl (?); Necip (?); Suat (?) | (Report) | Zeki Rıza (?) | Stadium: Taksim Stadi |

| 24 November 1921 2 | Galatasaray SK | 6–0 | Kumkapı SK | Istanbul |
| | | (Report) | | Stadium: Taksim Stadi |

| 23 December 1921 3 | Galatasaray SK | 2–3 | Küçükçekmece SK | Istanbul |
| | | (Report) | | Stadium: Taksim Stadi |

| 10 March 1922 4 | Galatasaray SK | 2–0 | Üsküdar Anadolu SK | Istanbul |
| | | (Report) | | Stadium: Taksim Stadi |

| 24 March 1922 5 | Galatasaray SK | 3–0 | Vefa SK SK | Istanbul |
| | | (Report) | | Stadium: Taksim Stadi |

| 30 March 1922 6 | Galatasaray SK | 4–1 | Altınordu İdman Yurdu SK | Istanbul |
| | | (Report) | | Stadium: Taksim Stadi |

| 14 April 1922 7 | Galatasaray SK | 9–2 | Türk Gücü SK | Istanbul |
| | | (Report) | | Stadium: Taksim Stadi |

| 21 April 1922 8 | Galatasaray SK | 3–1 | Hilal SK | Istanbul |
| | | (Report) | | Stadium: Taksim Stadi |

| 5 May 1922 9 | Galatasaray SK | 3–1 | Darüşşafaka SK | Istanbul |
| | | (Report) | | Stadium: Taksim Stadi |

| 19 May 1922 10 | Galatasaray SK | 7–1 | Beylerbeyi SK | Istanbul |
| | | (Report) | | Stadium: Taksim Stadi |

=== Friendly Matches ===
| 31 August 1921 1 | Galatasaray SK | 2 - 7 | FC Lausanne-Sport | Lausanne |

| 2 September 1921 2 | Galatasaray SK | 0 - 10 | Servette FC | Servette |

| 4 September 1921 3 | Galatasaray SK | 0 - 1 | KFC Phönix | Karlsruhe |

| 7 September 1921 4 | Galatasaray SK | 3 - 5 | 1. FC Saarbrücken | Saarbrücken |
| | Refik Osman Top; Zeki Rıza Sporel; Bekir Refet |

| 10 September 1921 5 | Galatasaray SK | 1–2 | FC Germania 06 Schwanheim | Frankfurt |
| | Bekir Refet |

| 14 September 1921 6 | Galatasaray SK | 1–1 | KFC Phönix | Ludwigshafen |
| | Bekir Refet |

| 17 September 1921 7 | Galatasaray SK | 4–1 | Ballspiel FC | Köln |
| | | Report |

| 18 September 1921 8 | Galatasaray SK | 1–0 | VfL Bochum | Bochum |

| 21 September 1921 9 | Galatasaray SK | 1–1 | VFB Peine | Peine |

| 23 September 1921 10 | Galatasaray SK | 3–5 | SV Arminia Hannover | Hannover |

| 25 September 1921 11 | Galatasaray SK | 0–6 | Hamburger SV | Hamburg |

| 28 September 1921 12 | Galatasaray SK | 1–0 | Werder Bremen | Bremen |
| | Zeki Rıza Sporel |

| 2 October 1921 13 | Galatasaray SK | 0–6 | 1. FC Nürnberg | Nürnberg |

| 4 October 1921 14 | Galatasaray SK | 0–7 | FV Dresden 06 | Dresden |

| 6 October 1921 15 | Galatasaray SK | 0-12 | Sparta Prague | Prague |

| 11 October 1921 16 | Galatasaray SK | 2–4 | ŠK Slovan Bratislava | Bratislava |

| 18 October 1921 17 | Galatasaray SK | 3–3 | Budapest University Team | Budapest |

| 16 April 1922 1 | Galatasaray SK | 4–0 | French Navy Crew | Istanbul |
| | | | | Stadium: Taksim Stadium |

| 23 June 1922 1 | Galatasaray SK | 0–0 | British Garrison | Istanbul |
| | | | | Stadium: Taksim Stadium |

| 30 June 1922 İdman Cemiyetleri Kupası | Galatasaray SK | 0–3 | Fenerbahçe SK | Istanbul |
| | | (Report) | | Stadium: Taksim Stadium |

| 13 October 1922 1 | Galatasaray SK | 2–2 | British Lightning | Istanbul |
| | | | | Stadium: Taksim Stadium |

| 17 December 1922 1 | Galatasaray SK | 1–4 | British Lightning | Istanbul |
| | | | | Stadium: Taksim Stadium |

| 24 December 1922 1 | Galatasaray SK | 5–0 | French Garrison | Istanbul |
| | | | | Stadium: İttihatspor Field |

==== Galatasaray Cup ====
Galatasaray won the cup.

| 1922 Galatasaray Cup | Galatasaray SK | 4–1 | Hilal SK | Istanbul |

| 1922 Galatasaray Cup | Galatasaray SK | 0–0 | Darüşşafaka SK | Istanbul |

| 1922 Galatasaray Cup | Galatasaray SK | 2–1 | Darüşşafaka SK | Istanbul |

| 1922 Galatasaray Cup Final 1 | Galatasaray SK | 3–3 | Altınordu İdman Yurdu SK | Istanbul |

| 1922 Galatasaray Cup Final 2 | Galatasaray SK | 3–1 | Altınordu İdman Yurdu SK | Istanbul |
