= Cafer Çağatay =

Turkish footballer

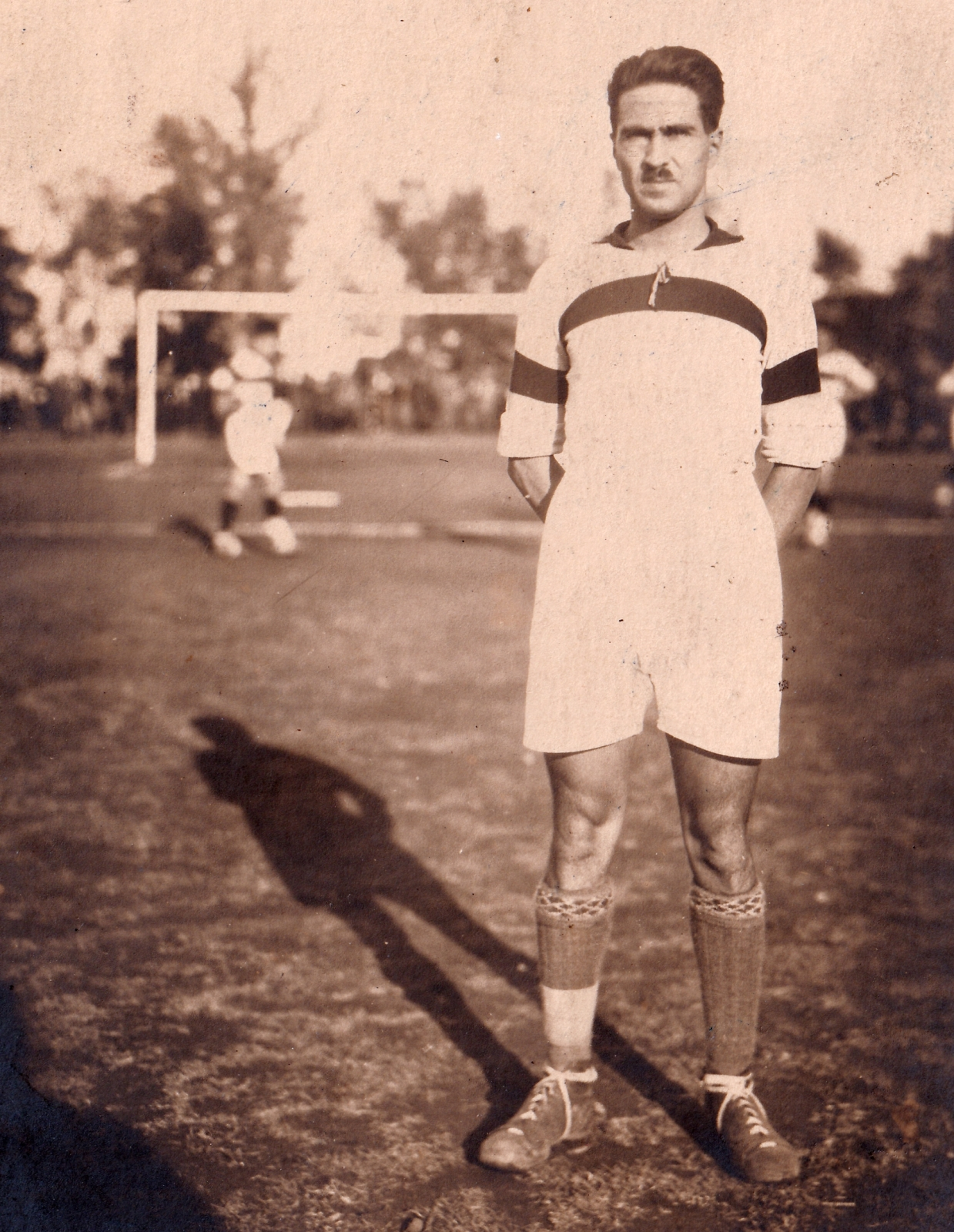

Personal information
- Date of birth: 1899
- Date of death: 24 April 1991 (aged 91–92)
- Place of death: Kadıköy, Istanbul, Turkey
- Position: Left back
- Fenerbahçe

Senior career*
Years	Team	Apps	(Gls)
1915-1916	Fenerbahçe		
1916-1918	Altınordu İdman Yurdu SK		

International career
1923-1923	Turkey national football team		
- * Club domestic league appearances and goals

Ali Cafer Çağatay (1899 – 24 April 1991) was a Turkish football player. He played as a left back for Fenerbahçe, Altınordu İdman Yurdu SK and the Turkey national football team. He was born in Kadıköy, Istanbul.

== Career ==
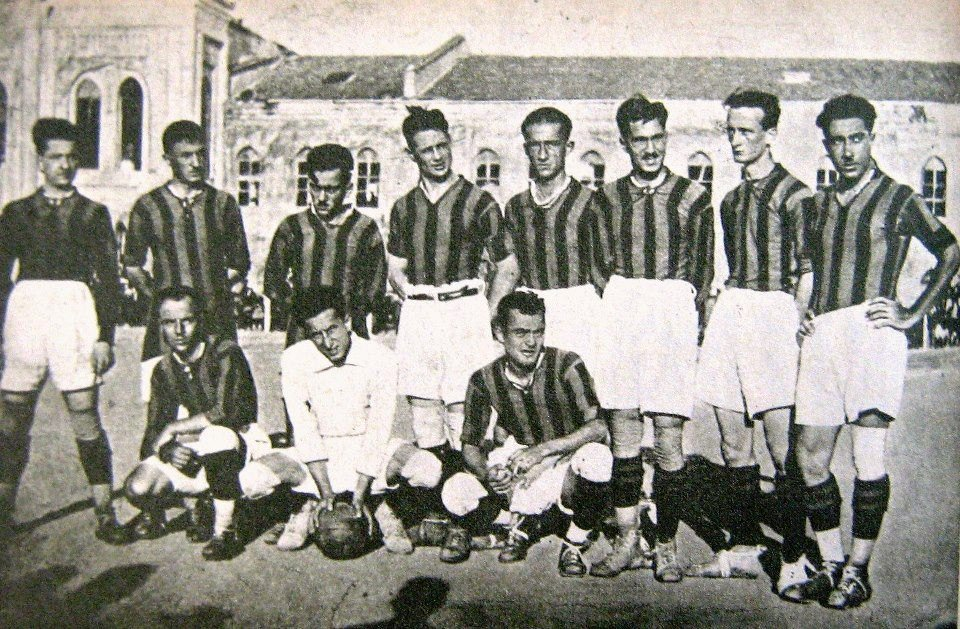
Fenerbahçe football team in the 1922–23 season. From left to right: Back row - Bedri Gürsoy, Zeki Rıza Sporel, Ömer Tanyeri, İsmet Uluğ, Sabih Arca, Cafer Çağatay, Fâhir Yeniçay, Kadri Göktulga, Fâhir Yeniçay Front row - Ragıp Mağden, Şekip Kulaksızoğlu, Alaattin Baydar.

Çağatay played for Fenerbahçe in 1915-16 before joining Altınordu İdman Yurdu SK, with whom he won the 1916–17 and 1917-18 Istanbul Football League Championships. In 1922 he rejoined Fenerbahçe, playing for the club until 1927. With Fenerbahçe he won the 1922-23 Istanbul Football League Championship and the General Harington Cup.

== National team ==
He was included in the first squad of the Turkey national football team, who played against Romania on 26 October 1923. He played 7 times for the national team, and represented his country at the 1924 Summer Olympics.

== Personal life ==
Çağatay graduated from Saint Joseph High School and Istanbul University, Faculty of Pharmacy. He was the son of Turkish composer, oud virtuoso, and academic Ali Rıfat Çağatay who arranged the Turkish National Anthem.
