= 1921–22 Istanbul Football League =

İstanbul Football League
- Season: 1921–22
- Champions: Galatasaray (6th title)

The 1921–22 İstanbul Football League season was the 15th season of the league. Galatasaray won the league for the sixth time.

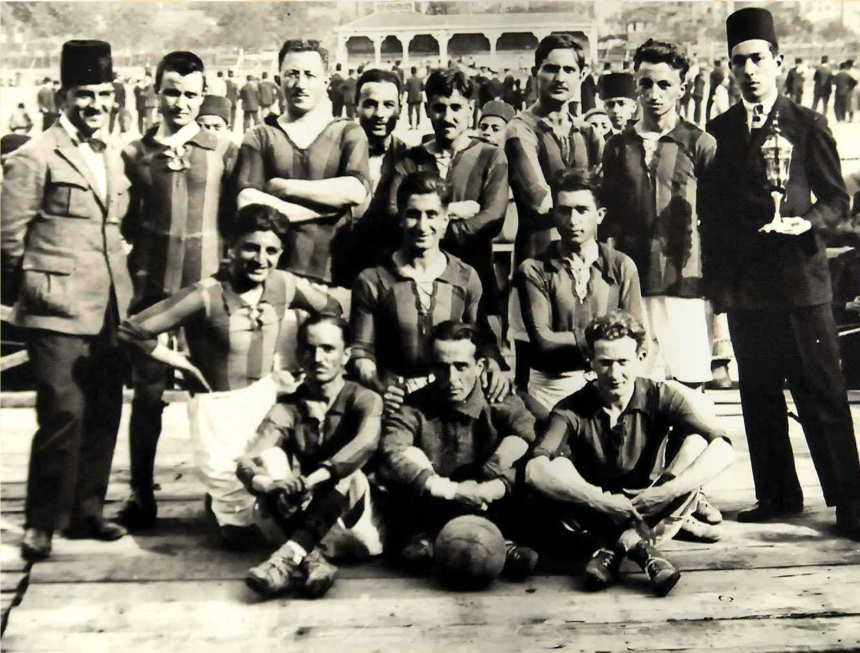
Istanbul Friday League - Galatasaray SK 1921-22 Champion

== Season ==
Pos	Team	Pld	W	D	L	GF	GA	GD	Pts
1	Galatasaray SK	10	9	0	1	44	10	+34	18
2	Fenerbahçe SK	10	8	0	2	45	11	+34	16
3	Vefa SK	9	4	3	2	12	13	−1	11
4	Darüşşafaka SK	9	4	2	3	16	12	+4	10
5	Üsküdar Anadolu SK	10	3	4	3	12	12	0	10
6	Küçükçekmece SK	8	4	1	3	22	19	+3	9
7	Altınordu İdman Yurdu SK	8	3	1	4	13	16	−3	7
8	Hilal SK	9	2	1	6	9	14	−5	5
9	Beylerbeyi SK	8	2	0	6	9	26	−17	4
10	Türk Gücü SK	5	0	1	4	4	25	−21	1
11	Kumkapı SK	6	0	1	5	1	29	−28	1
