= 1925–26 Istanbul Football League =

Istanbul Football League
- Season: 1925-26
- Champions: Galatasaray SK (8th title)

The 1925–26 İstanbul Football League season was the 19th season of the league. Galatasaray SK won the league for the 8th time. The tournament was single-elimination, not league as in the past.

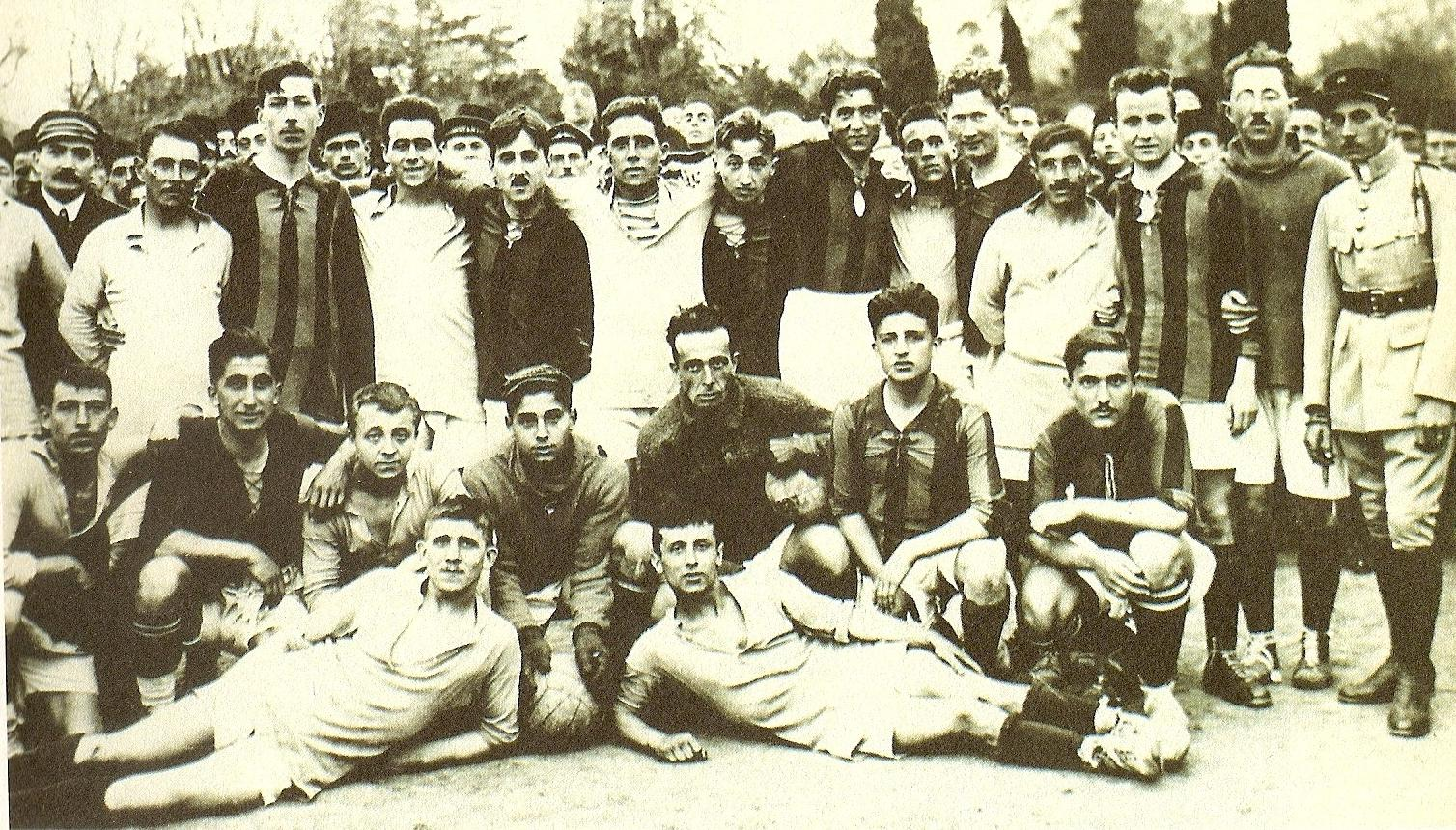
Istanbul League - Galatasaray SK 1925-26 Champion

== Season ==
Pos	Team
1	Galatasaray SK (C)
2	Fenerbahçe
3	Vefa SK
4	Fatih İdman Yurdu SK
5	Beykozspor
6	Harbiye SK
7	Beşiktaş JK
8	Altınordu İdman Yurdu SK
9	Süleymaniye FC
10	Hilal FC
11	Anadolu
12	Beylerbeyi SK
13	Üsküdar Anadolu SK
14	Haliç SK

(C) Champions

== Finals ==
Quarter Finals
Galatasaray - Beykozspor SK 6:2
Fenerbahçe - Harbiye SK 3:2

Semi finals
Fenerbahçe - Fatih İdman Yurdu SK 9:0
Galatasaray SK - Vefa SK 2:1

Final
Fenerbahçe - Galatasaray SK 0:3
Galatasaray SK - Fenerbahçe 3:1
