= 1915–16 Istanbul Football League =

İstanbul Football League
- Season: 1915–16
- Champions: Galatasaray (5th title)

The 1915–16 İstanbul Football League season was the 11th season of the league. Galatasaray won the league for the fifth time. Starting from this season, a 3-2-1 point system was used, with clubs receiving no points for forfeit losses.

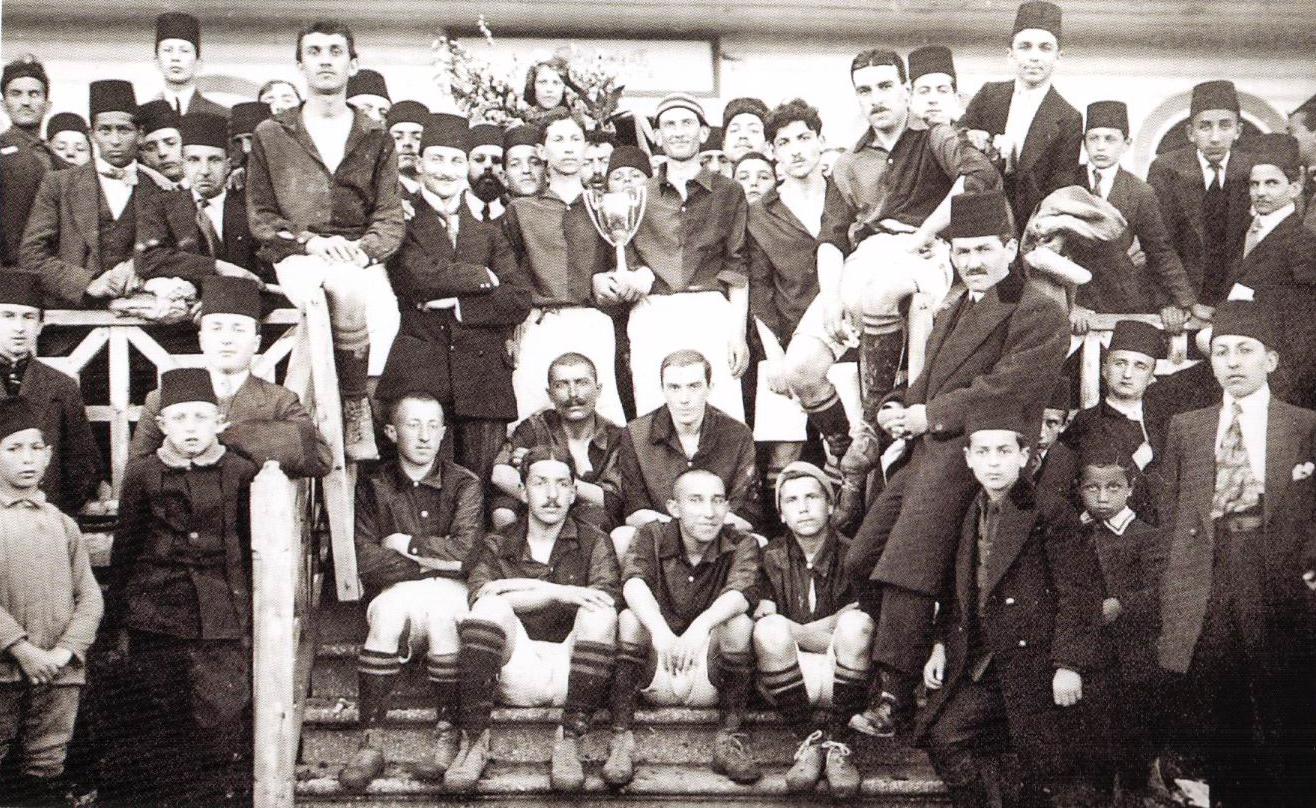
Istanbul Friday League - Galatasaray SK 1915-16 Champion

== Season ==
Pos	Team	Pld	W	D	L	GF	GA	GD	Pts
1	Galatasaray	10	7	2	1	31	12	+19	25 (Note: Galatasaray apparently forfeited the match they lost.)
2	Fenerbahçe SK	10	6	2	2	36	10	+26	24
3	Altınordu İdman Yurdu SK	0	?	?	?	?	?	—	0
4	Üsküdar Anadolu SK	0	?	?	?	?	?	—	0
5	Küçükçekmece SK	0	?	?	?	?	?	—	0
6	Anadolu Hisarı İdman Yurdu SK	0	?	?	?	?	?	—	0

== Matches ==
Galatasaray SK - Anadolu Üsküdar 1908 SK: 4-0
Galatasaray SK - Fenerbahçe SK: 2-2
Galatasaray SK - Küçükçekmece SK: 3-2
Galatasaray SK - Altınordu İdman Yurdu SK: 2-0
Galatasaray SK - Anadolu Hisarı İdman Yurdu SK: 5-2
Galatasaray SK - Anadolu Üsküdar 1908 SK: 1-1
Galatasaray SK - Fenerbahçe SK: 1-3
Galatasaray SK - Altınordu İdman Yurdu SK: 5-0
Galatasaray SK - Küçükçekmece SK: 5-2
Galatasaray SK - Anadolu Hisarı İdman Yurdu SK: 3-0
Fenerbahçe SK - Altınordu İdman Yurdu SK: 1-2
Fenerbahçe SK - Anadolu Hisarı İdman Yurdu SK: 3-0
Fenerbahçe SK - Küçükçekmece SK: 12-0
Fenerbahçe SK - Anadolu Üsküdar 1908 SK: 1-2
Fenerbahçe SK - Altınordu İdman Yurdu SK: 3-1
Fenerbahçe SK - Anadolu Hisarı İdman Yurdu SK: 6-0
Fenerbahçe SK - Küçükçekmece SK: 4-1
Fenerbahçe SK - Anadolu Üsküdar 1908 SK: 1-1
