= Özdil =

Özdil is a Turkish word, and it may refer to:

== Surname ==
- Fitnat Özdil (1910–1993), Turkish female rower
- Melek Özdil (1916–?), Turkish female rower
- Nezihe Özdil (1911–1984), Turkish female rower
- Özdil Nami (born 1967), Turkish-Cypriot politician
