= 1924–25 Istanbul Football League =

Istanbul Football League
- Season: 1924–25
- Champions: Galatasaray SK (7th title)

The 1924–25 İstanbul Football League season was the 18th season of the league. Galatasaray SK won the league for the 7th time. The tournament was single-elimination, not league as in the past.

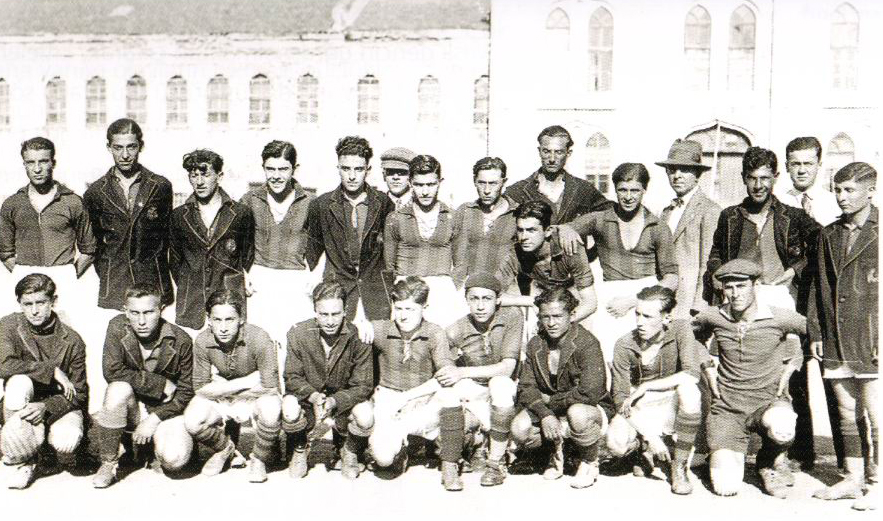
Istanbul League - Galatasaray SK 1924-25 Champion

== Season ==
=== Semifinals ===
Team 1	Score	Team 2
Galatasaray SK (Turkey)	6-1	(Turkey) Beşiktaş JK
Vefa SK (Turkey)	?	(Turkey) ?

=== Final ===
Team 1	Score	Team 2
Galatasaray SK (Turkey)	4-0	(Turkey) Vefa SK

== Participated teams ==
Haliç, Fazilet, İkbaliye, Ortaköy SK, Beykozspor, Yıldız, Bakırköy, Fenerbahçe SK, Altınordu İdman Yurdu SK, Galatasaray SK, Vefa SK, Hilal SK, Küçükçekmece SK, Beşiktaş JK, Beylerbeyi SK, Üsküdar Anadolu SK, Nişantaşı SK, Topkapı İdman Yurdu SK, Darüşşafaka SK, İstiklal SK, Gürbüzler, Makrıköyspor, Kumkapı SK, Üsküdar, Türk İdman Ocağı SK, Fatih SK, Yenişafak SK, Kasımpaşa SK, Topkapı SK
