= 1924–25 Beşiktaş J.K. season =

Beşiktaş J.K.
1924–25 season
- President: Ahmet Aşeni
- Manager: Şeref Bey
- Stadium: Taksim Stadium
- Istanbul Football League: 3rd
- Turkish Football Cup: Not held

The 1924–25 season was the club's 5th official football season and their 22nd year in existence. They qualified for the playoffs, but lost to Galatasaray in the semi-finals 1–6.

== Istanbul Football League ==
Beşiktaş finished in the top 4, qualifying for the playoffs, along with Galatasaray, Vefa S.K. and Anadolu Üsküdar 1908.

=== Semi finals ===
1925	Galatasaray (Turkey)	6 – 1	(Turkey) Beşiktaş	Istanbul, Turkey
				Stadium: Taksim Stadium; Attendance: ??? Referee: ???
