= 1917–18 Istanbul Football League =

İstanbul Football League
- Season: 1917–18
- Champions: Altınordu İdman Yurdu SK (2nd title)
- Matches: 60

The 1917–18 İstanbul Football League season was the 13th season of the league. Altınordu İdman Yurdu SK won the league for the second time. This season used a 3-2-1 point system.

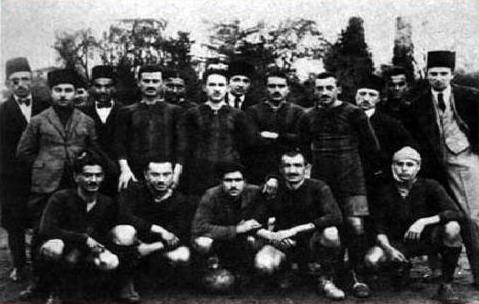
Istanbul Friday League - Altınordu İdman Yurdu 1916-17 and 1917-18 Champion

== Season ==
Pos	Team	Pld	W	D	L	GF	GA	GD	Pts
1	Altınordu İdman Yurdu SK	10	9	0	1	23	9	+14	28
2	Fenerbahçe SK	10	6	1	3	31	10	+21	23
3	Küçükçekmece SK	10	?	?	?	?	?	—	22
4	Üsküdar Anadolu SK	10	?	?	?	?	?	—	16
5	Anadolu Hisarı İdman Yurdu SK	10	?	?	?	?	?	—	15
6	Galatasaray SK	10	3	0	7	10	6	+4	11
