= 1914–15 Istanbul Football League =

Istanbul Football League
- Season: 1914–15
- Champions: Fenerbahçe (3rd title) & Galatasaray (4th title)

The 1914–15 Istanbul Football League season was the 10th season of the league. Because of the high number of teams participating in the league and eventual disagreements among the clubs, there were two separate groups in that year. As a result, there were two Istanbul champions at the end of the season. Galatasaray won the Istanbul Football Union League (Turkish: İstanbul Futbol Birliği Ligi), while Fenerbahçe became champions in the Istanbul Championship League (Turkish: İstanbul Şampiyonluğu Ligi). According to most sources, including RSSSF, there was a final match between Fenerbahçe and Galatasaray on 11 February 1916, which Fenerbahçe won 3–1, and thus became the sole champions of the 1914–15 season.

For the first time, no English or Greek club competed and the league consisted only of Turkish clubs, following the eruption of WW I.

== Season ==
=== Istanbul Football Union League ===
Pos	Team	Pld	W	D	L	GF	GA	GD	Pts
1	Galatasaray SK	7	5	0	2	36	11	+25	10
2	Üsküdar Anadolu	7	?	?	?	?	?	—	10
3	Anadolu İdman Yurdu	0	?	?	?	?	?	—	0
4	Altınordu	0	?	?	?	?	?	—	0
5	Küçükçekmece SK	0	?	?	?	?	?	—	0

=== Istanbul Championship League ===
Pos	Team	Pld	W	D	L	GF	GA	GD	Pts
1	Fenerbahçe SK	8	8	0	0	32	5	+27	16
2	Türk İdman Ocağı	8	5	1	2	14	9	+5	11
3	Darüşşafaka	8	3	2	3	11	13	−2	8
4	Hilal	8	1	2	5	9	20	−11	4
5	Darülmuallimin	8	0	1	7	6	25	−19	1

== Playoff ==
A playoff match was played to determine the winning team in the Istanbul Football Union League. Galatasaray won the match.

Galatasaray SK	3 – 2	Üsküdar Anadolu

Union Club Field, Istanbul
Referee: Unknown
