= Ersin Veli =

Turkish footballer

Personal information
- Date of birth: 2 April 1982 (age 44)
- Place of birth: Düzce, Turkey
- Height: 1.80 m (5 ft 11 in)
- Position: Central defender

Youth career
- Üsküdar Anadolu

Senior career*
Years	Team	Apps	(Gls)
1999–2001	Üsküdar Anadolu	4	(1)
2001–2002	Düzcespor	33	(0)
2002–2003	Fethiyespor	24	(1)
2003–2004	Darıca Gençlerbirliği	24	(0)
2004–2006	Eyüpspor	55	(2)
2006–2007	Gebzespor	27	(0)
2007–2008	Diyarbakır	24	(0)
2009	Giresunspor	16	(0)
2009	Ceahlăul Piatra Neamț	2	(0)
2010–2011	Samsunspor	41	(0)
2012	Giresunspor	8	(0)
2012–2013	Karşıyaka	11	(0)
2013	Eyüpspor	18	(2)
2014	Tavşanlı Linyitspor	12	(1)
2014–2015	Yeni Malatyaspor	32	(1)
2015	Karşıyaka	4	(0)
2016	Fethiyespor	6	(0)
Total		341	(8)
- * Club domestic league appearances and goals

Ersin Veli (born 2 April 1982) is a former Turkish footballer who played as a central defender. In 2009 he had his only experience outside Turkey playing in Romania for Liga I club Ceahlăul Piatra Neamț.

== Honours ==
Yeni Malatyaspor

- TFF Second League: 2014–15
