= 1925–26 Beşiktaş J.K. season =

Beşiktaş J.K.
1925–26 season
- President: (Turkey) Ahmet Aşeni
- Manager: (Hungary) Imre Zinger
- Stadium: Taksim Stadium
- Istanbul Football League: Failed to reach finals
- Turkish Football Cup: Not held

The 1925–26 season

was the club's 6th official football season

and their 23rd year in existence.

It was the first year after Şeref Bey's retirement.

The team failed to finish in the top 4

and missed the playoffs. Galatasaray S.K. won the cup.

Pre-Season

Fenerbahçe (Turkey)	4 – 1	(Turkey) Beşiktaş

Karşıyaka (Turkey)	0 – 2	(Turkey) Beşiktaş

FK 13 Sofia (Bulgaria)	1 – 1	(Turkey) Beşiktaş

Levski Sofia (Bulgaria)	2 – 1	(Turkey) Beşiktaş

Trakia Plovdiv (Bulgaria)	0 – 0	(Turkey) Beşiktaş

Beşiktaş (Turkey)	1 – 2	(Bulgaria) Levski Sofia
