= 1916–17 Istanbul Football League =

İstanbul Football League
- Season: 1916–17
- Champions: Altınordu İdman Yurdu SK (1st title)
- Matches: 50

The 1916–17 İstanbul Football League season was the 12th season of the league. Altınordu İdman Yurdu SK won the league for the first time. This season used a 3-2-1 point system.

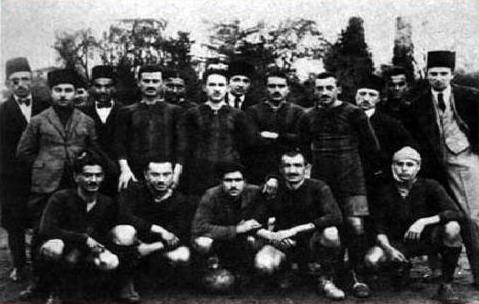
Istanbul Friday League - Altınordu İdman Yurdu 1916-17 and 1917-18 Champion

== Season ==
Pos	Team	Pld	W	D	L	GF	GA	GD	Pts
1	Altınordu İdman Yurdu SK	9	8	1	0	?	?	—	26
2	Üsküdar Anadolu SK	9	6	0	3	?	?	—	21
3	Fenerbahçe SK	9	3	2	4	19	13	+6	17
4	Küçükçekmece SK	9	4	0	5	?	?	—	17
5	Galatasaray SK	9	3	0	6	16	26	−10	15
6	Anadolu Hisarı İdman Yurdu SK	5	0	1	4	?	?	—	6

== Matches ==
Fenerbahçe SK - Küçükçekmece SK: 0-1
Altınordu İdman Yurdu SK - Fenerbahçe SK : 1-1
Fenerbahçe SK - Anadolu Üsküdar 1908 SK: 7-0
Fenerbahçe SK - Anadolu Hisarı İdman Yurdu SK: 1-1
Fenerbahçe SK - Galatasaray: 4-1
Küçükçekmece SK - Fenerbahçe SK: 2-1
Fenerbahçe SK - Altınordu İdman Yurdu SK: 1-3
Anadolu Üsküdar 1908 SK - Fenerbahçe SK: 2-1
Galatasaray - Fenerbahçe SK: 2-3

- Anadolu Hisarı İdman Yurdu SK left the league in the second half of the season.
