= 1932–33 Galatasaray S.K. (men's basketball) season =

Galatasaray SK
1932–33 season
- Chairman: (Turkey) Selahattin Beyazıt
- Manager: (Turkey) Petar Simenov

Galatasaray SK Men's 1932–1933 season is the 1932–1933 basketball season for Turkish professional basketball club Galatasaray SK.

== Depth chart ==
Pos.	Starting 5	Bench 1	Bench 2
C	Naili Moran	Rodrig
PF	Hayri Arsebük	Feridun Vasfi Koray
SF	İlhan Ulagay	Kamil Koray
SG	Feridun Şerefzade	Nihat Rıza Ertuğ
PG	Yekta	Celal	Ethem

=== Regular season ===
Pos	Team	Total
		Pts
1	İstanbulspor	?
2	Galatasaray SK	?
3	Beşiktaş JK	?
4	Hilal SK	?
5	Fenerbahçe	?

Pts=Points, Pld=Matches played, W=Matches won, L=Matches lost

==== Matches ====
1st Half

March 10, 1933

[ (Report)]

Galatasaray SK	28–27	Beşiktaş

Galatasaray Club, Istanbul
Attendance: unknown

March 24, 1933

[Won by decision (Report)]

Galatasaray SK	20–0	Fenerbahçe

Galatasaray Club, Istanbul
Attendance: unknown

1933

[Won by decision (Report)]

Galatasaray SK	20–0	Hilal SK

Galatasaray Club, Istanbul
Attendance: unknown

May 5, 1933

[Lost by decision. Galatasaray left the league. (Report)]

Galatasaray SK	0–20	Beşiktaş

Beyoğlu Halkevi, Istanbul
Attendance: unknown

1933

[Lost by decision. (Report)]

Galatasaray SK	0–20	İstanbulspor

Beyoğlu Halkevi, Istanbul
Attendance: unknown
