= Bekir Refet =

Turkish footballer

Bekir Refet Teker
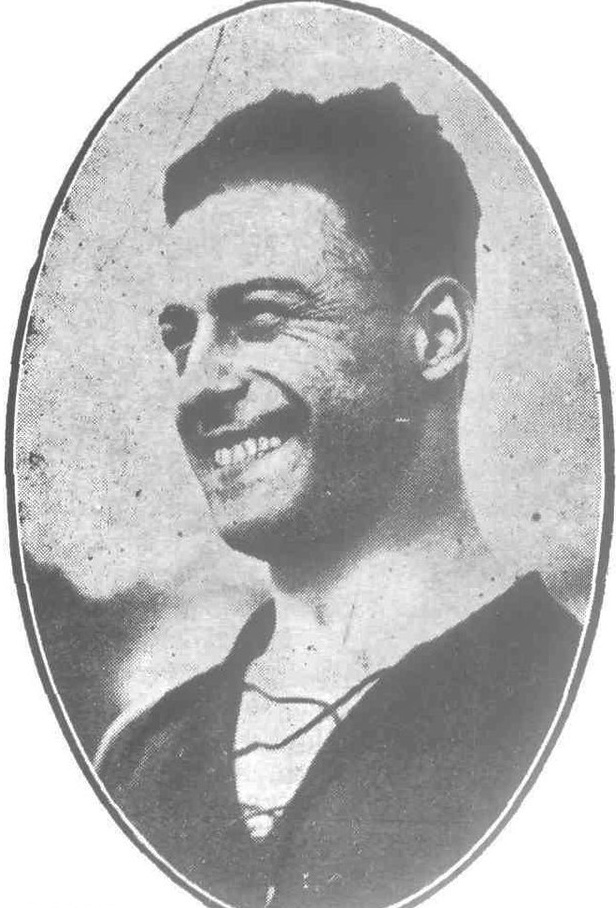

Personal information
- Full name: Bekir Refet Teker
- Date of birth: May 22, 1899
- Place of birth: Istanbul, Ottoman Empire
- Date of death: April 5, 1977 (aged 77)
- Place of death: Karlsruhe, Germany
- Position: Striker

Youth career
- 1911–1913: Fenerbahçe SK

Senior career*
Years	Team	Apps	(Gls)
1915–1916	Fenerbahçe SK		
1916–1918	Altınordu İdman Yurdu SK		
1920–1921	İttihatspor		
1921–1923	Karlsruher FC Phönix		
1923–1926	1. FC Pforzheim		
1926–1928	Karlsruher FV		

International career
1924–1928	Turkey	3	(3)
- * Club domestic league appearances and goals

Bekir Refet Teker (May 22, 1899 – April 5, 1977) was a Turkish footballer. He played as a striker for Fenerbahçe and the Turkey national football team. Like most youth from Kadıköy his career started in the Fenerbahçe youth teams until he was promoted to the senior team. Bekir then played for Altinordu, Galatasaray (in friendly matches only) and Karlsruhe in Germany. Bekir was a member of the Olympic squads of Turkey in 1924 and 1928.

When SK Slavia Prague team of the 1920s came to Turkey, Bekir scored the winning goal as Fener won the match 1–0.

== Career statistics ==
=== International goals ===
#	Date	Venue	Opponent	Score	Result	Competition
1.	25 May 1924	Stade Bergeyre, Paris, France	Czechoslovakia	5–2	Lost	1924 Summer Olympics
2.	25 May 1924	Stade Bergeyre, Paris, France	Czechoslovakia	5–2	Lost	1924 Summer Olympics
3.	28 May 1928	Olympic Stadium, Amsterdam, Netherlands	Egypt	1–7	Lost	1928 Summer Olympics
Correct as of 13 January 2013
