= Heshmat =

Heshmat is a given name and surname that may refer to:

== Given name ==
- Heshmat Fahmi, member of the Pan-African Parliament and member of the People's Assembly of Egypt
- Heshmat Mohajerani (born 1938), Iranian football coach, manager, and former player
- Heshmat Sanjari (1918–1995), Iranian conductor and composer
- Heshmat Tabarzadi, Iranian democratic activist
- Heshmat Taleqani physician in Lahijan and one of Mirza Kuchak Khan allies during the Jangal movement

== Surname ==
- Hassan Heshmat (born 1920), Egyptian sculptor
- Hooshang Heshmat, CEO and co-founder of Mohawk Innovative Technology
