= Cahit =

Cahit is a Turkish given name for males. It is also used as a surname It is the Turkish form of the Arabic word Jahid (Arabic: جاهِد jāhid), which means "effort, strive" or "endeavour" and stems from the Arabic verb jahada (Arabic: َجَهَد) "to do effort to get something - be laborious; be perseverant; be sedulous; be serious". Notable people named Cahit include:

== First name ==
- Cahit Aral (1927–2011), Turkish engineer and politician
- Cahit Arf (1910–1997), Turkish mathematician
- Cahit Irgat (1915–1971), Turkish actor
- Cahit Karakaş (1928–2025), Turkish engineer and politician
- Cahit Kıraç (born 1956), Turkish bureaucrat
- Cahit Külebi (1917–1997), Turkish poet
- Cahit Ölmez (1963–2025), Turkish Dutch actor
- Cahit Önel (1927–1970), Turkish athlete
- Cahit Ortaç (1908–1980), Turkish politician
- Cahit Özkan (born 1976), Turkish politician
- Cahit Paşa (born 1973), Turkish football player
- Cahit Süme (born 1972), Turkish boxer
- Cahit Talas (1917–2006), Turkish academic
- Cahit Tanyol (1914–2020), Turkish writer and sociologist
- Cahit Sıtkı Tarancı (1910–1956), Turkish poet and author
- Cahit Zarifoğlu (1940–1987), Turkish poet and writer

== Middle name ==
- Cemil Cahit Toydemir (1883–1956), Turkish army officer
- Hüseyin Cahit Yalçın (1874–1957), Turkish writer and politician
- Mehmet Cahit Turhan (born 1960), Turkish engineer and civil servant

== Surname ==
- Neriman Cahit (born 1937), Turkish Cypriot poet and author
