= Fehmi =

Fehmi is a Turkish given name for males. It is Turkish spelling of the Arabic name and word Fahmi (Arabic: فهمي) which means "understanding, comprehension, knowing".

People named Fehmi include:

- Fehmi Agani (1932–1999), sociologist, leading political strategist, assassinated Albanian-Kosovar national hero
- Fehmî (1564–1596), Ottoman poet
- Fehmi Bülent Yıldırım (born 1966), Turkish Muslim activist
- Fehmi Koru (born 1950), Turkish columnist and journalist
- Fehmi Mert Günok (born 1989), Turkish footballer
- Fehmi Naji (born 1928), Grand Mufti of Australia
- Hasan Fehmi Bey (1874–1909), Assassinated Turkish journalist
- Hasan Fehmi Güneş (1934–2021), Turkish politician
- Mustafa Fehmi Kubilay (1906–1930), Turkish national hero

== See also ==
- Fahmi
