= General Harington Cup =

1923 football match in Turkey

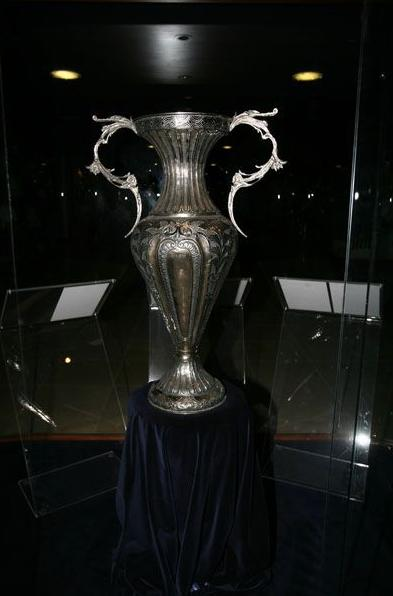
The trophy on display in the Fenerbahçe Museum

The General Harington Cup was a single friendly football match between the Turkish multi-sport club Fenerbahçe SK and a team put together by General Charles Harington composed of soldiers and professional players. It took place at the conclusion of the British invasion of Turkey, with the local team beating the British team 2–1.

== History ==
At the end of World War I, the Ottoman Empire's lands had been invaded by Italian, French, Greek and British troops. On 13 November 1918, British troops entered Istanbul and the invasion was official. During the course of invasion, British troops arranged football matches with one team they had claimed the most shady. Fenerbahçe participated in many such games, winning 41, losing 5, and reaching a tie in 4 games.

The head commander of British troops was General Charles Harington, and he was upset about the clandestine activities. He was looking for victory on both the pitch and the battlefield. The Turkish resistance was pushing back the invasion, with victories on multiple fronts. The invasion started to fade, the Treaty of Lausanne was on the horizon, and the British were getting ready to leave Istanbul.

== The final game ==
General Harington wanted to leave the Turks with a memory of a heavy defeat whilst the British left, so he called in the best players of the Irish Guards, Grenadier Guards and Coldstream Guards along with four professional players called in from the homeland. The team was collected under the name Coldstream Guards and the British General issued an announcement in the newspapers: "Gardler Muhteliti Türk kulüplerine meydan okuyor. Galibine, Başkumandanın adını taşıyan büyük bir kupa verilecek bu maça Türk kulüpleri diledikleri gibi takviye de alabilirler." ("Guards Joint is challenging the Turkish clubs. The Turkish clubs can gather any reinforcements to their clubs for this game whose winner will be awarded a trophy which will be named after the Head Commander.") Fenerbahçe replied briefly, with another announcement which was printed in the newspapers the following days: "Fenerbahçe Kulübü yalnız kendi kadrosuyla bu maçı şartsız olarak kabul eder." ("Fenerbahçe Club accepts this proposal with only its own squad, unconditionally.")

== Match performance ==
The game took place in the Taksim Stadium on 29 June 1923. The Governor of Malta, Lord Herbert Plumer watched the game from the VIP area with General Harington.

The game was close, with the Guards Joint taking the lead in the first half. Fenerbahçe SK took control of the game in the second half, beginning with Zeki Rıza's game-tying goal in the 61st minute.

Zeki Rıza scored the go-ahead goal in the 74th minute. Fenerbahçe SK won 2–1 and was awarded the trophy.

== Details ==
28 June 1923
17:30 UTC+02:00

(Turkey) Fenerbahçe S.K.	2–1	(United Kingdom of Great Britain and Ireland) Coldstream Guards
Zeki Rıza Sporel 60', 74'		Willie Ferguson 30'

Taksim Stadium, Istanbul

Fenerbahçe

GK	1	(Turkey) Şekip Kulaksızoğlu
DF		(Turkey) Hasan Kamil Sporel (c)
DF		(Turkey) Cafer Çağatay
DF		(Turkey) Kadri Göktulga
MF		(Turkey) İsmet Uluğ
MF		(Turkey) Fahir Yeniçay
MF		(Turkey) Sabih Arca
MF		(Turkey) Alaattin Baydar
FW	10	(Turkey) Zeki Rıza Sporel
FW		(Turkey) Ömer Tanyeri
FW		(Turkey) Bedri Gürsoy
Head coach:
(Turkey) Mustafa Elkatipzade

GK	1	(United Kingdom of Great Britain and Ireland)
DF		(United Kingdom of Great Britain and Ireland)
DF		(United Kingdom of Great Britain and Ireland)
MF		(Scotland) Willie Ferguson
MF		(United Kingdom of Great Britain and Ireland)
MF		(United Kingdom of Great Britain and Ireland)
FW		(United Kingdom of Great Britain and Ireland)
FW		(United Kingdom of Great Britain and Ireland)
FW		(United Kingdom of Great Britain and Ireland)
FW		(United Kingdom of Great Britain and Ireland)
FW		(United Kingdom of Great Britain and Ireland)
Head coach:
(United Kingdom of Great Britain and Ireland)

== The trophy ==
The huge trophy is considered an important trophy that Fenerbahçe won against the occupying forces. It is made of silver and is one meter tall (approximately 3 feet, 4 inches).
