= Fenerbahçe S.K. (rowing) =

Turkish rowing club

Fenerbahçe Rowing

- Location: Kadıköy, Istanbul, Turkey
- Coordinates: 40°58′55.81″N 29°2′5.72″E
- Home water: Marmara Sea
- Founded: 1910
- Affiliations: Turkish Rowing Federation
- Website: http://www.fenerbahce.org/kurek

Events
- Turkish Rowing Championship, Turkish Rowing Cup

Distinctions
- 35 Championships (men), 18 Championships (women)

Fenerbahçe Rowing is the men's and women's rowing section of Fenerbahçe S.K., a major sports club in Istanbul, Turkey.

Three years after the club was founded (1910), it became operational and won its first inter-club championship cup in 1917 at the end of the races organized in its name V. Mehmet From Reşad The rowing branch's boathouse was turned into a weapons and ammunition depot for Fenerbahçe fans who were smuggling weapons to Anatolia using boats that docked at the pier in front of the club building on the edge of Kurbağalıdere during the War of National Struggle. Fenerbahçe, which had an eternal rivalry with Galatasaray in this sport during the Republican era, continues its leadership in this sport by becoming champions 43 times in the men's category and 29 times in the women's category until 2024. Having become the Istanbul Champion in the men's category 37 times, the Istanbul Cup champion 30 times and the Turkish Cup champion 37 times, Fenerbahçe has also achieved significant success in this branch of sports internationally. Fenerbahçe has been the club that has provided the most athletes to the national team since Tonguç Türsan, who achieved Turkey's first official success in the international arena by winning the silver medal in single sculls at the 1955 Mediterranean Games. The canoe team, which was active in the branch in 1999-2000, became history after a while due to lack of interest.

== Honours (Men) ==
=== International competitions ===
- Head of the Charles Regatta
  - 3rd place (1): 2006
  - 4th place (1): 2002
  - 5th place (1): 2014
- D-Inverno International Marathon Rowing Championships
  - 4th place (1): 2007
- Croatia Open Zagreb
  - Winners (1): 2006

=== National competitions ===
- Turkish Rowing Championship
  - Winners (44) (record): 1951, 1955, 1962, 1963, 1964, 1965, 1968, 1969, 1976, 1977, 1978, 1979, 1980, 1981, 1982, 1983, 1984, 1985, 1986, 1990, 1991, 1995, 1996, 1997, 1998, 1999, 2001, 2002, 2003, 2004, 2005, 2006, 2008, 2011, 2014, 2017, 2018, 2019, 2020, 2021, 2022, 2023, 2024, 2025
- Turkish Rowing Cup
  - Winners (31) (record) 1977, 1978, 1979, 1980, 1981, 1982, 1983, 1984, 1985, 1986, 1990, 1991, 1995, 1996, 1997, 1998, 1999, 2000, 2001, 2002, 2003, 2005, 2006, 2007, 2008, 2009, 2011, 2012, 2014, 2016, 2017
- Istanbul Championship
  - Winners (37) (record): 1922, 1923, 1924, 1925, 1926, 1951, 1954, 1955, 1962, 1963, 1964, 1968, 1969, 1970, 1973, 1976, 1977, 1978, 1979, 1980, 1981, 1982, 1983, 1984, 1985, 1986, 1987, 1988, 1994, 1996, 1997, 1998, 1999, 2000, 2001, 2002, 2003
- Istanbul Cup
  - Winners (30) (record): 1965, 1966, 1967, 1968, 1972, 1976, 1977, 1978, 1979, 1980, 1981, 1982, 1983, 1984, 1985, 1986, 1987, 1988, 1989, 1990, 1991, 1994, 1995, 1996, 1998, 1999, 2000, 2001, 2002, 2003
- GSGM Cup
  - Winners (6): 2000, 2001, 2003, 2005, 2006, 2007
- Mediterranean Cup
  - Winners (5): 2000, 2002, 2004, 2007, 2008
- Naval Academy Cup
  - Winners (4): 2000, 2003, 2004, 2006

== Honours (Women) ==
=== National competitions ===
- Turkish Women's Rowing Championship
  - Winners (25) (record): 1976, 1977, 1978, 1979, 1980, 1985, 1990, 1991, 1992, 2003, 2004, 2005, 2006, 2007, 2011, 2014, 2015, 2016, 2019, 2020, 2021, 2022, 2023, 2024, 2025
- Turkish Rowing Cup
  - Winners (3): 2003, 2011, 2014

== Technical staff ==
Name	Nat.	Position
Fikret Çetinkaya	(Turkey)	Coordinator
Çağlar Özdemir	(Turkey)	Department Captain
Hüseyin Turoğlu	(Turkey)	Manager
Celalettin Güneştan	(Turkey)	Coach
Ali Nedrettin Şen	(Turkey)	Coach
Berkin Yılmaz	(Turkey)	Coach
Levent Avat	(Turkey)	Coach
Yiğit Saygılıgil	(Turkey)	Coach
Ozan Yelaldı	(Turkey)	Coach
Birol Atmaca	(Turkey)	Assistant Coach

== Current rowers ==
- Elis Özbay (born 2001)

== Notable former rowers ==
- Fitnat Özdil (1910–1993)
- Melek Özdil (1916– )
- Nezihe Özdil (1911–1984)
- Vecihe Taşçı (1905–2002)
- Levent Darkanat (1977–1979)
