= Fahmi =

Fahmi (Arabic: فهمي) is an Arabic name in the possessive form of the word fahm (Arabic: فَهْم) which means "understanding, comprehension, knowing", and which stems from the verb fahima (Arabic: فَهِمَ) meaning "come to know about", "to realize, understand or comprehend". It may refer to:

== Given name ==
- Fahmi Abdullah Ahmed, Yemeni captured and detained in the United States Guantanamo Bay detainment camps in Cuba
- Fahmi al-Abboushi (1895–1975), co-founder of the Palestinian political party Hizb al-Istiqlal (Independence Party)
- Fahmi al-Husseini (1886–1940), mayor of Gaza (1929–1939) under British rule
- Fahmi Idris (born 1943), Indonesian politician in Golkar Party and government minister
- Fahmi Fadli (born 1976), Indonesian politician
- Fahmi Reza (born 1977), Malaysian political artist
- Fahmi Said (1898–1942), Iraqi colonel
- Mohammad Fahmi bin Abdul Shukor, a convicted rioter and gang member of Salakau in Singapore
- Mustafa Fahmi Pasha (1840–1914), Egyptian politician, cabinet minister, and twice premier

== Surname ==
- Abdelilah Fahmi (born 1973), Moroccan football defender who plays for Raja Casablanca
- Heshmat Fahmi, member of the Pan-African Parliament and a member of the People's Assembly of Egypt
- Ismail Fahmi (1922–1997), Egyptian diplomat and politician
- Nabil Fahmi (born 1951), Egyptian diplomat and politician, and Ismail Fahmi's son
- Sameh Fahmi (born 1949), Egyptian politician

Variants:

- Mohamed Fahmy, Canadian journalist
