= Fitnat Özdil =

Turkish rower (1910–1993)

Personal information
- Born: Fitnat; 1910 Istanbul, Ottoman Empire
- Died: 9 May 1993 (aged 82–83) Istanbul, Turkey
- Years active: 1928 – 1942

Sport
- Country: Turkey
- Sport: Rowing
- Event: Coxless four
- Club: Fenerbahçe S.K.
- Team: Fenerbahçe Rowing
- Partner(s): Vecihe Taşçı, Nezihe Özdil, Melek Özdil
- Retired: 1942

Fitnat Özdil (1910 – 9 May 1993) was a Turkish rower for Fenerbahçe Rowing in Istanbul. She was one of the first female sport rowers in Turkey.

== Private life ==
Fitnat Özdil was born in Istanbul, then Ottoman Empire, in 1910. She had two sisters,, Nezihe (1911–1984) and Melek (1916– ) . She was employed by Sümerbank, from where she later retired.

== Sports career ==
She started her sport rowing career at the age of 18 entering the watersports branch of Altınordu İdman Yurdu in Istanbul. In 1930, she transferred to Fenerbahçe Rowing. She became one of the first female sport rowers in Turkey along with Vecihe Taşçı and her two sisters. She and her teammates were known as unrivaled in coxless four rowing, and won multiple times Istanbul and Turkish championships. She retired from active sport in 1942.

== Death ==
She died in Istanbul on 9 May 1993. She was laid to rest following the religious funeral at Söğütlüçeşme Mosque in Kadıköy. She was 63-year long member of the Fenerbahçe S.K.
