= Vecihe Taşçı =

Turkish tennis player and rower

Personal information
- Born: Vecihe; 1905 Istanbul, Ottoman Empire
- Died: 2002 (aged 96–97) Istanbul, Turkey

Sport
- Country: Turkey
- Sport: Rowing, tennis
- Event: Coxless four
- Club: Fenerbahçe S.K.
- Team: Fenerbahçe Rowing
- Partner(s): Fitnat Özdil, Nezihe Özdil, Melek Özdil

Vecihe Taşçı (1905–2002) was a Turkish female rower and tennis player for Fenerbahçe S.K. in Istanbul. She was one of the first female sport rowers and tennis players in Turkey.

== Private life ==
Vecihe Taşçı was born in Istanbul, then Ottoman Empire, in 1905. She died in Istanbul in 2002.

== Sports career ==
She started her sports career sport rowing at the Fenerbahçe Rowing. She became one of the first female sport rowers in Turkey along with the Özdil sisters Fitnat (1910–993), Nezihe (1911–1984) and Melek (1916– ). She and her teammates were known as unrivaled in coxless four rowing, and won multiple times Istanbul and Turkish championships.

In 1927, she began tennis playing. She played with the spouses and daughters of the Fenerbahçe S.K. members at tennis courts in Kuşdili, Kadıköy until the 1940s. She was one of the first female tennis players in Turkey.
