= Melek Özdil =

Turkish rower

Personal information
- Born: Melek; 1916 (age 109–110) Istanbul, Ottoman Empire
- Education: Istanbul University, Faculty of Economics

Sport
- Country: Turkey
- Sport: Rowing
- Event(s): Coxless four, coxless pair
- Club: Fenerbahçe S.K.
- Team: Fenerbahçe Rowing
- Partner(s): Vecihe Taşçı, Fitnat Özdil, Nezihe Özdil

Melek Özdil (born 1916) was a Turkish rower for Fenerbahçe Rowing in Istanbul. She was one of the first female sport rowers in Turkey.

== Private life ==
Melek Özdil was born in Istanbul, then Ottoman Empire, in 1916. She had two sisters, Fitnat (1910–1993) and Nezihe (1911–1984). After graduating from the Istanbul University, Faculty of Economics, she worked at the Sümerbank, from which she later retired.

== Sports career ==
She started her sport rowing career entering the watersports branch of Altınordu İdman Yurdu in Istanbul. She was coached by her older sisters. She soon transferred to Fenerbahçe Rowing. She became one of the first female sport rowers in Turkey along with Vecihe Taşçı and her two sisters. She and her teammates were known as unrivaled in coxless four rowing, and won multiple times Istanbul and Turkish championships. She was also successful in coxless pair rowing. She was winner of the Prime Minister Cup with her partners.
