= Nezihe Özdil =

Turkish rower (1911–1984)

Personal information
- Born: Nezihe; 1911 Istanbul, Ottoman Empire
- Died: 29 March 1984 (aged 72–73) Istanbul, Turkey
- Years active: 1928 – 1940

Sport
- Country: Turkey
- Sport: Rowing
- Event: Coxless four
- Club: Fenerbahçe S.K.
- Team: Fenerbahçe Rowing
- Partner(s): Vecihe Taşçı, Fitnat Özdil, Melek Özdil
- Retired: 1940

Nezihe Özdil (1911 – 29 March 1984) was a Turkish rower for Fenerbahçe Rowing in Istanbul. She was one of the first female sport rowers in Turkey.

== Private life ==
Nezihe Özdil was born in Istanbul, then Ottoman Empire, in 1911. She had two sisters, Ftnat (1910–1993) and Melek (1916– ).

== Sports career ==
She started her sport rowing career entering the watersports branch of Altınordu İdman Yurdu in Istanbul. She soon transferred to Fenerbahçe Rowing. She became one of the first female sport rowers in Turkey along with Vecihe Taşçı and her two sisters. She and her teammates were known as unrivaled in coxless four rowing, and won multiple times Istanbul and Turkish championships. She won the Prime Minister Cup with her partners in 1935. She retired from active sport in 1940 after performing rowing 12 years long.

== Death ==
She died in Istanbul on 29 March 1984.
