= 1928–29 Istanbul Football League =

Istanbul Football League
- Season: 1928–29
- Champions: Galatasaray SK (10th title)

The 1928–29 İstanbul Football League season was the 21st season of the league. Galatasaray SK won the league for the 10th time.

== Season ==
Pos	Team	Pld	W	D	L	GF	GA	GD	Pts
1	Galatasaray SK	10	8	2	0	29	11	+18	28
2	Fenerbahçe SK	10	7	0	3	31	16	+15	24
3	Beşiktaş JK	10	4	3	3	29	20	+9	21
4	Vefa SK	10	2	4	4	14	16	−2	18
5	Beykoz 1908 S.K.D.	10	3	1	6	13	26	−13	17
6	Küçükçekmece SK	10	1	0	9	10	37	−27	12
