= Ömer Tanyeri =

Turkish footballer (1900–1967)

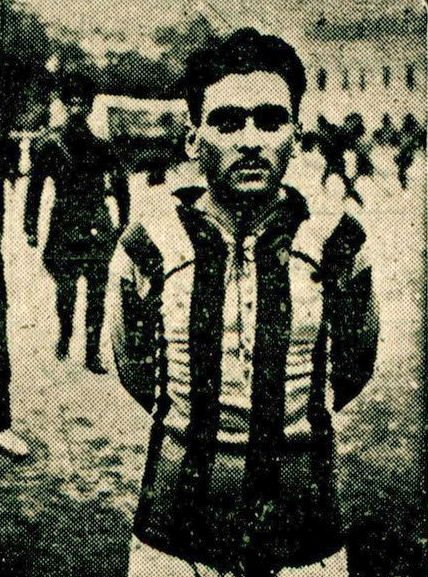
Ömer Tanyeri with Fenerbahce jersey in the 1923.

Ömer Tanyeri (1900–1967) was a Turkish footballer who played as a forward for Fenerbahçe. His nickname was Beleş Ömer.

He scored 52 goals in 70 matches for Fenerbahçe between 1921 and 1925. Furthermore, he won the 1922–23 Istanbul League Championship. He also played for Altınordu İdman Yurdu SK between 1917 and 1919 and won the 1917–18 Istanbul Football League Championship.

He was also a member of the General Harington Cup squad.
