= Cahit Paşa =

Turkish footballer (born 1973)

Personal information
- Date of birth: 25 August 1973 (age 53)
- Place of birth: Kardzhali, Bulgaria
- Height: 1.80 m (5 ft 11 in)
- Position: Midfielder

Senior career*
Years	Team	Apps	(Gls)
1993–1995	Bornovaspor		
1995–1996	Kuşadasıspor		
1996–1998	Efesspor		
1998–1999	Kartalspor	31	(5)
1999–2002	Konyaspor	100	(12)
2002–2003	Karşıyaka		
2003–2004	Aksarayspor		
2004–2005	Siirtspor		
2005–2006	Yalovaspor	30	(3)
2006–2007	Kastamonuspor	15	(1)
2007	Gölcükspor	15	(1)
2007–2008	Alibeyköyspor	12	(1)
2008	Portadown		
2008–2010	Kirsehirspor	59	(8)
2010–2011	Aydınspor 1923	15	(0)
- * Club domestic league appearances and goals

Cahit Paşa (born 25 August 1973) is a Turkish former professional footballer who played as a midfielder. He played for Bornovaspor, Kuşadasıspor, Efesspor, Kartalspor, Konyaspor, Karşıyaka S.K., Aksarayspor, Siirtspor, Yalovaspor, Kastamonuspor, Gölcükspor and Alibeyköyspor in Turkey and for Portadown in Northern Ireland.

== Career ==
Paşa was born in Kardzhali, Bulgaria.

He played for Konyaspor in the Turkish 2. League A during the 2001–02 season, appearing in 31 league matches.

In January 2008, Paşa joined Northern Irish Premier League side Portadown.
