= Cevat Seyit =

Turkish footballer (1906–1945)

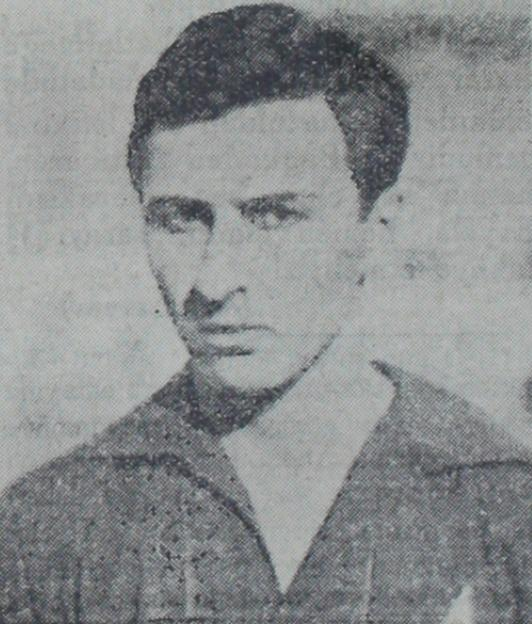
- Seyit in 1931

Personal information
- Date of birth: 17 July 1906
- Place of birth: Istanbul, Ottoman Empire
- Date of death: 23 November 1945 (aged 39)
- Place of death: Istanbul, Turkey
- Positions: Right-back; midfielder

Youth career
- 1920–1925: Fenerbahçe

Senior career*
Years	Team	Apps	(Gls)
1925–1939	Fenerbahçe	252	(6)

International career
1926–1932	Turkey	9	
- * Club domestic league appearances and goals

Cevat Seyit (17 July 1906 – 23 November 1945) was a Turkish footballer. He competed in the men's tournament at the 1928 Summer Olympics. He played for Fenerbahçe for a total of 14 years between 1925 and 1939, and is one of the longest-serving footballers in Fenerbahçe's history.

== Club and International career ==
Cevat Seyit, who started his football career in 1920 when he was only 14 years old, was raised in the youth team of Fenerbahçe and rose to the first team in 1925; drawing attention with his football as a winger on the right side of the defense and in the midfield, played for First team of Fenerbahçe for a total of 14 years between 1925 and 1939. Cevat Seyit managed to score 6 goals with the yellow-navy jersey he wore 252 times in total.

He won a total of 12 championships under the Fenerbahçe uniform, including the 1929–30, 1932–33, 1934–35, 1935–36 and 1936-37 Istanbul Football League, the 1933 and 1935 Turkish Football Championship, the 1937 National League and the 1930, 1934, 1938 and 1939 Istanbul Shield Championships.

Cevat Seyit, who never played for any team other than Fenerbahçe, first became a national player in a special match played against Bulgaria on 17 July 1927, and wore the crescent-star jersey 9 times until 1932. He took part in the national team that participated in the 1928 Summer Olympics held in Amsterdam, Netherlands.
