= Fahir =

Fahir is a Turkish given name for males. It is the Turkish spelling of the Arabic name Fakhr (Arabic: فَخْر) which generally means "highest in quality", but also bears the meaning "glory, pride, honour". The Arabic variants of the name with similar meaning is Faakhr (Arabic: فَاخْر fākh·r) or Fakheer (Arabic: فَخير fakhiyr/ fakhīr).

Also, it is used a title who is explains and counsels, knowledgeable of in both Islamic religious studies, theology in the Islamic world which some notable Islamic saints bear this title.

People named Fahir include:

- Fahir Atakoğlu (born 1963), Turkish pianist and composer
- Fahir Ersin (1929–1988), Turkish journalist
- Fahir Özgüden (1933–1979), Turkish hurdler
- Osman Fahir Seden (1924–1998), Turkish film director
