= Billy Hunter (footballer) =

Scottish footballer and manager

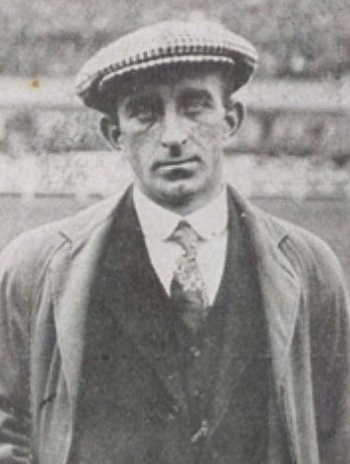
- Hunter in 1914

Personal information
- Full name: William Hunter
- Date of birth: 2 April 1885
- Place of birth: Alva, Scotland
- Date of death: 1937 (aged 51–52)
- Place of death: New York City, United States
- Position: Forward

Senior career*
Years	Team	Apps	(Gls)
1904–1909	Millwall Athletic	150	(43)
1909–1912	Bolton Wanderers	53	(15)
Total		203	(58)

Managerial career
- 1912–1914: DFC
- 1914: Netherlands
- 1921–1922: Hakoah Vienna
- 1922–1923: Lausanne Sports
- 1924–1926: Turkey
- 1924–1928: Galatasaray
- * Club domestic league appearances and goals

William Hunter (2 April 1885 – 1937) was a Scottish professional football player and manager. He managed the Netherlands national side, Austrian club side Hakoah Vienna, Swiss club side Lausanne Sports, the Turkey national team and Galatasaray.

As a player he played for Millwall Athletic and Bolton Wanderers.

== Honours ==
=== Player ===
Bolton Wanderers

- Second Division: 1908–09
  - automatic promotion: 1910–11

=== Manager ===
Dordrecht

- KNVB Cup: 1913–14
  - runners-up: 1912–13

Netherlands

- Coupe Vanden Abeele: 1914
- Rotterdamsch Beker: 1914

Hakoah Vienna

- Austrian League runners-up: 1921–22

Lausanne Sports

- Swiss Serie A West runners-up: 1922–23

Galatasaray

- Atatürk Gazi Cup: 1928
- Istanbul League: 1924–25, 1925–26, 1926–27
