= Jahid =

Jahid (Arabic: جاهِد jāhid) is an Arabic name from the word which means "effort, strive" or "endeavour" and stems from the Arabic verb jahada (Arabic: َجَهَد) "to do effort to get something; be laborious; be perseverant; be sedulous; be serious". Notable people with this name include:

- Jahid Ali, Pakistani cricketer
- Jahid Ahmed, English cricketer
- Jahid Jahim, Malaysian politician
- Jahid Javed, Bangladeshi cricketer
- Jahid Mohseni, Tajik businessman
- Jahid Hasan, Bangladeshi singer and composer
- Raid Jahid Fahmi, Iraqi politician and economist

== See also ==
- Jaahid Ali
