= Ragıp =

Ragıp or Ragip may refer to:

- Ragıp Başdağ (born 1978), Turkish footballer
- Ragıp Gümüşpala (1897–1964), Turkish military officer and politician
- Ragip Jashari (1961–1999), Albanian politician
- Ragıp Zarakolu (born 1948), Turkish human rights activist
- Ragıp Vural Tandoğan (born 1965), Turkish long-distance swimmer
- Koca Ragıp Pasha (1698–1763), Ottoman statesman and Grand Vizier
