= Heshmat Fahmi =

Egyptian politician

Heshmat Fahmi is a member of the Pan-African Parliament and a member of the People's Assembly of Egypt.
