= Kemal Rıfat Kalpakçıoğlu =

Turkish footballer

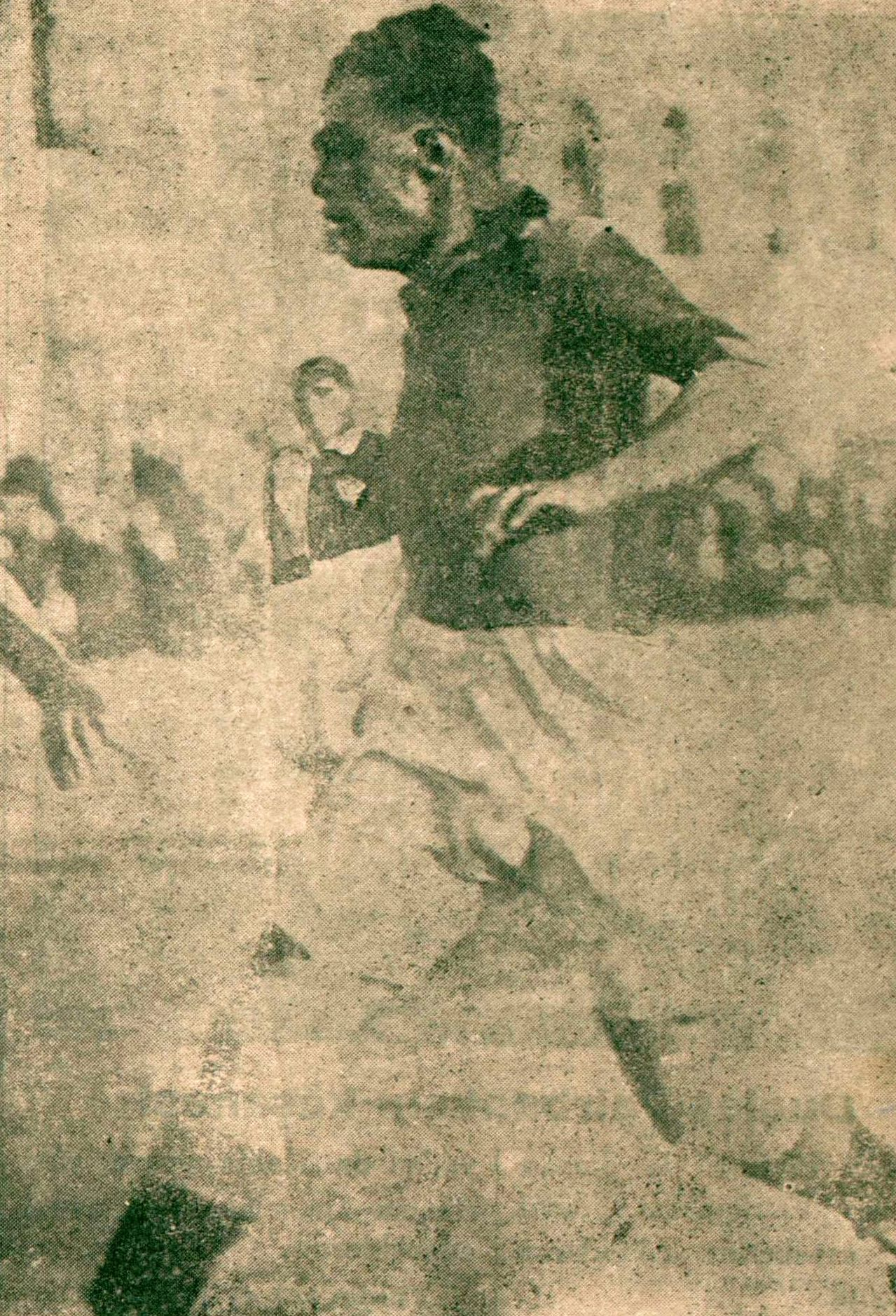

Personal information
- Date of birth: 1899
- Date of death: 7 September 1975 (aged 75–76)

International career
Years	Team	Apps	(Gls)
1924-1927	Turkey	9	(0)

Kemal Rıfat Kalpakçıoğlu (1899 – 7 September 1975) was a Turkish footballer. He played in nine matches for the Turkey national football team between 1924 and 1927.
