= Ali Gençay =

Turkish footballer (1905–1957)

Personal information
- Date of birth: 2 February 1905
- Place of birth: Istanbul, Turkey
- Date of death: 28 March 1957 (aged 52)

International career
Years	Team	Apps	(Gls)
- Turkey

Ali Gençay (2 February 1905 – 28 March 1957) was a Turkish footballer. He competed in the men's tournament at the 1924 Summer Olympics.
