= Refik Osman Top =

Turkish footballer (1897–1957)

Refik Osman
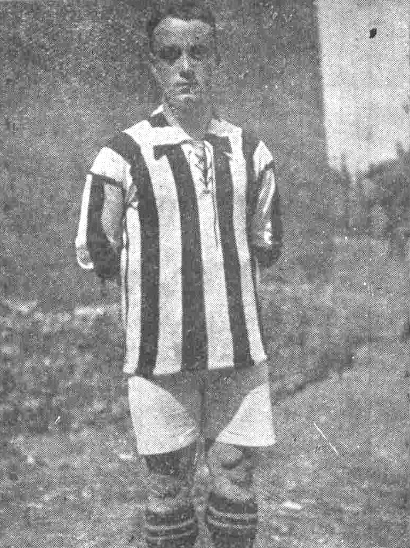

Personal information
- Full name: Refik Osman Top
- Date of birth: 1 January 1897
- Place of birth: Valideçeşme, Beşiktaş, Ottoman Empire
- Date of death: 26 April 1957 (aged 60)
- Place of death: İstanbul, Turkey
- Positions: Midfielder; defender

Youth career
- Basiret
- 1910: Beşiktaş
- Sebat
- 1912–1913: Beşiktaş
- 1913–1915: Fenerbahçe

Senior career*
Years	Team	Apps	(Gls)
1915–1917	Galatasaray		
1917–1921	Altınordu		
1921–1922	Galatasaray		
1922	Union Club (İttihatspor)		
1923	Fenerbahçe		
1923	Galatasaray		
1923–1924	Beşiktaş		
1924	Galatasaray		
	Beşiktaş	1	

International career
1924	Turkey	1	(0)

Managerial career
- 1935–1944: Beşiktaş
- 1946–1948: Beşiktaş
- * Club domestic league appearances and goals

Refik Osman Top (born Refik Osman; 1 January 1897 – 26 April 1957), known by his nickname Şiir –literally meaning the Poem–, was a Turkish footballer, referee, coach and sports columnist. Top was one of the most decorated players in the early decades of Turkish football, winning the Istanbul Football League both as a player and manager. He was also the first footballer to play for the Big Three clubs of Turkey.

Top is a prominent figure in the history of Beşiktaş J.K., being one of the founders and initial players of football department and the first international footballer to represent Turkey.

== Playing career ==
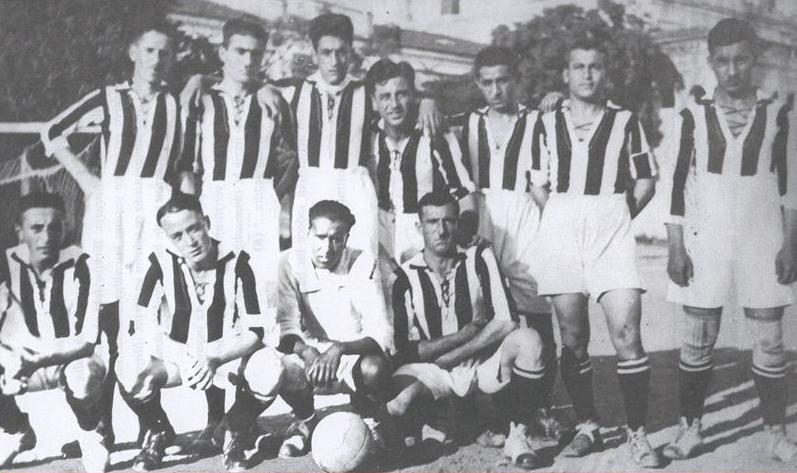
Top was one of the members of 1923–24 Istanbul League winner squad Goalkeeper: Sadri Usuoğlu, Defenders: Tevfik Martı, Refik Osman Top, Midfielders: Bahattin, Cavit Altındal, Şahap, Forwards: Nafi, Abdi Aksoyman, Edip, Hasan, Saadet

Scoring twice, Top had become the first scorer ever of Beşiktaş–Galatasaray rivalry, at Istanbul Football League encounter held on 22 August 1924 at Taksim Stadium. He represented Turkey once on 16 November 1924 against Soviet Union, in a friendly game held at Imeni Vorovskogo Stadium, ended 3–0 for home side. This appearance made him the first Beşiktaş J.K. player ever to play for national team.

== Refereeing career ==
Top arbitrated 18 games between 1927 and 1945 in Istanbul Football League and Milli Küme.

== Coaching career ==
Top managed Beşiktaş for two tenures. During his first stint, he earned 5 consecutive titles at Istanbul Football League between 1938 and 1943.

== Honours ==
=== Player ===
Galatasaray

- Istanbul Football League: 1914–15

Beşiktaş

- Istanbul Football League: 1923–24

=== Coach ===
Beşiktaş

- Istanbul Football League: 1938–39, 1939–40, 1940–41, 1941–42, 1942–43

== Bibliography ==
Books

- Yüce, Mehmet (2015). İdmancı Ruhlar: Futbol Tarihimizin Klasik Devreleri: 1923-1952 Türkiye Futbol Tarihi - 2. Cilt (in Turkish). Istanbul: İletişim Yayınları. ISBN 9789750516955.
