= Bedri Gürsoy =

Turkish footballer

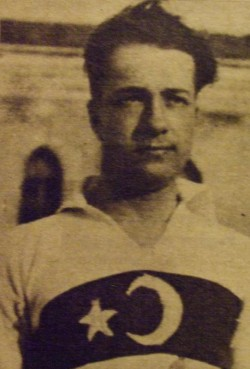
Bedri Gürsoy

Bedri Gürsoy (1902 – 4 February 1994) was a Turkish football player. He played as a left winger or left forward for Fenerbahçe. He is regarded as one of the best left forwards in Turkish football history.

== Biography ==
Gürsoy was born in 1902 in Kadıköy, Istanbul. He played 134 matches and scored 34 goals for Fenerbahçe between 1921 and 1928. He won the 1920–21 and 1922–23 Istanbul League Championships. After his retirement he functioned as a board member of Fenerbahçe S.K. He was included in the General Harington Cup squad.

He was included in the first squad of the Turkey national football team that played against Romania on 26 October 1923. He was included in the national squad that competed in the 1924 Summer Olympics.

He died on 4 February 1994 in Kadıköy, Istanbul.
