= İsmet Uluğ =

Turkish footballer (1901–1975)

İsmet Uluğ (1901 – 27 August 1975) was a Turkish football player of rivals Galatasaray and Fenerbahçe. Born in Istanbul, he played as a midfielder and winger and was nicknamed Yavuz İsmet.

Uluğ played for Fenerbahçe between 1919 and 1928 and also captained the team. He was also the president of Fenerbahçe between 1962 and 1966. He won the 1920–21, 1922–23 Istanbul League Championships as a player. He won the 1963–64 and 1964–65 Turkish League Championships as a president. He was included in the General Harington Cup squad.

He was included in the first squad of the Turkey national football team that played against Romania on 26 October 1923. He played 11 times for the national team. He was included in the national squads for the 1924 Summer Olympics and the 1928 Summer Olympics.
