= Kadri Göktulga =

Turkish footballer

Kadri Göktulga (1904 – 25 October 1973) was a Turkish football player who played for Fenerbahçe and the Turkey national football team. Born in Istanbul, he played as a left back and left midfielder.

== Career ==
Göktulga played 198 matches and scored 6 goals for Fenerbahçe between 1921 and 1931, winning three Istanbul League Championships and the General Harington Cup He played 10 times for the national team, and was a member of Turkey's team at both the 1924 and 1928 Summer Olympics.

From 1970 to 1971 he sat on the board of Fenerbahçe.

== Honours ==
- Istanbul Football League
  - Winner - 1920-21, 1922–23, 1929–30
- General Harington Cup
  - Winner
