= Emil Oberle =

German footballer

Personal information
- Date of birth: 15 November 1889
- Place of birth: Karlsruhe, German Empire
- Date of death: 25 December 1955 (aged 66)
- Place of death: Karlsruhe, West Germany
- Position: Forward

Senior career*
Years	Team	Apps	(Gls)
1904–1912	FC Phönix-Alemannia Karlsruhe		
1912-1918	Galatasaray		

International career
1909	Germany	3	(0)
1912	Germany Olympics	2	(1)
- * Club domestic league appearances and goals

Emil Oberle (16 November 1889 in Karlsruhe – 25 December 1955 in Karlsruhe) was a German amateur footballer who played as a forward and competed in the 1912 Summer Olympics. He was a member of the German Olympic squad and played two matches in the consolation tournament.
