= Anadolu Hisarı İdman Yurdu S.K. =

Anadolu Hisari Idman Yurdu
- Full name: Anadolu Hisari Idman Yurdu Spor Kulübü
- Founded: 1913
- Ground: Er Meydanı
Home colours

Anadolu Hisarı İdman Yurdu SK is sports club of Istanbul, Turkey.

== History ==
Anadolu Hisarı İdman Yurdu SK was founded on 1 April 1913.

- Winner: İstanbul Amatör Küme Group
- Winner: İstanbul championship

== Branches ==
- Football
- Field Hockey
- Rowing

== See also ==
- List of Turkish Sports Clubs by Foundation Dates
