= Hilal S.K. =

Hilal SK
- Full name: Hilal Spor Kulübü
- Founded: 1912
- Ground: Papazın Çayırı
Home colours

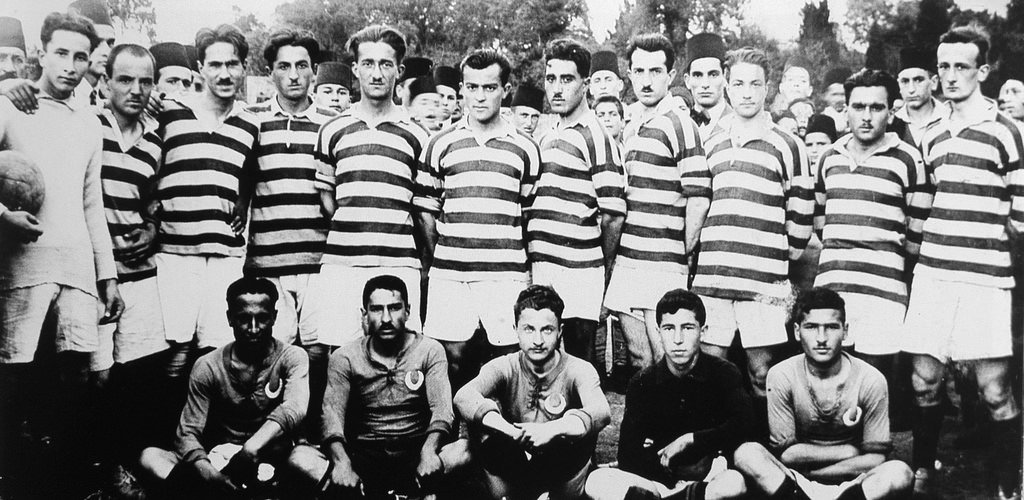
Hilal SK squad (sitting) 1922–23 season, before the match against Fenerbahçe SK

Hilal SK is a sports club of Göztepe, Istanbul, Turkey, established during the last days of the Ottoman Empire.

== History ==
Hilal SK was founded by Halit Galip Ezgü in 1912. One of the original founders of the Turkish Football Federation in 1923, the club celebrated its first Centennial Anniversary in 2012.

== Honours ==
- Istanbul Football League:
  - Degree:5th 1922–1923

== Matches ==
14 May 1915, Fenerbahçe SK – Hilal SK: 5–1
18 June 1915, Fenerbahçe SK – Hilal SK: 4–1
20 October 1922, Fenerbahçe SK – Hilal SK: 4–0
26 January 1923, Fenerbahçe SK – Hilal SK: 9–0
1924, Galatasaray S.K. – Hilal SK: 3–1
16 June 1936, Fenerbahçe SK – Hilal SK: 6–1
14 February 1937, Beşiktaş JK – Hilal SK: 8–1
19 February 1939, Güneş SK – Hilal SK: 0–3 Won by decision
24 March 1940, Topkapı SK – Hilal SK: 3–0

== See also ==
- List of Turkish Sports Clubs by Foundation Dates
