= Üsküdar Anadolu S.K. =

Association football club in Turkey

- Full name: Üsküdar Anadolu Spor Kulübü
- Founded: 1908; 118 years ago
- Ground: Selimiye Stadı
- Capacity: 4.500
- Chairman: Kadir Birinci
- League: Turkish Super Amateur League
Home colours	Away colours

Üsküdar Anadolu Spor Kulübü is a Turkish football club based in Üsküdar district of Istanbul. It was founded by Mehmed Bürhaneddin (Burhan Felek) and Dr. Hüdai in 1908. Their team colours are green and white. They are currently playing in Turkish Super Amateur League, Istanbul Group 3. They were groundsharing with Beylerbeyi SK at the Beylerbeyi 75. Yıl Stadium. They are currently playing at Spor Akademisi Stadium at Anadolu Hisarı. The club wants to use the Burhan Felek Stadium but the ground doesn't meet the professional football regulations.

== Defunct branches ==
Wrestling, handball and athletics.

== Honours ==
- Istanbul Football League:
  - Runner-up: 1914–1915, 1916–1917

== See also ==
- List of Turkish Sports Clubs by Foundation Dates
