= Küçükçekmece S.K. =

Turkish football club

Küçükçekmece SK
- Full name: Küçükçekmece Spor Kulübü
- Founded: 1911; 115 years ago
- Ground: Metin Oktay Stadium
- Capacity: 3,000
- Chairman: Ahmet Kurşun
- Manager: Harun Özkan
- League: İstanbul Süper Amatör Ligi
- Website: http://www.kucukcekmecespor.com/
Home colours	Away colours

Küçükçekmece SK is a sports club of Istanbul, Turkey.

== History ==
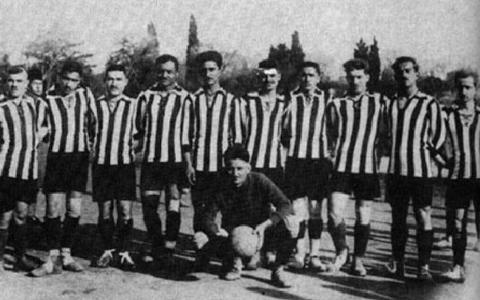
Süleymaniye FC at Union Club Field in 1912

Küçükçekmece SK was founded by Hikmet Barlan under the name Süleymaniye Terbiye-i Bedeniye Kulübü in 1911. The first colors were navy blue-orange. Later they changed it to black and white. In 1990, the club moved from Eminönü to the Küçükçekmece district and changed its name to Küçükçekmece SK and the colors to green and white.

== Honours ==
- Istanbul Football League:
  - Runners-Up: 1931–1932

== See also ==
- List of Turkish Sports Clubs by Foundation Dates
