= Altınordu İdman Yurdu =

- Full name: İstanbul Altınordu İdman Yurdu
- Founded: 1909
- Dissolved: 1926
- Ground: Papazın Çayırı
Home colours

Altınordu İdman Yurdu were a Turkish sports club based in Istanbul, Turkey. Founded in 1909 under the name Progres FC, the football department of the club became champions in the Istanbul Football League in the 1916–17 and 1917–18 seasons. The club colours were red and navy blue.

== History ==
Altınordu İdman Yurdu were founded by Aydınoğlu Raşit Bey under the name Progres FC in 1909 by footballers who left Galatasaray. In 1914, Talat Pasha became the club president and the team became the football club of the Committee of Union and Progress party. Also in 1914, the club changed their name to Altınordu İdman Yurdu and soon gained considerable success in the Istanbul Football League. They eventually dissolved in 1926.

== Honours ==
- Istanbul Football League

Winners (2): 1916–17, 1917–18

== See also ==
- List of Turkish sports clubs by foundation dates
