= Sabri Gençsoy =

Turkish association football player

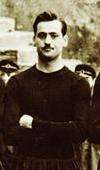
- Gençsoy in 1940–41 season

Personal information
- Full name: Sabri Gençsoy
- Date of birth: 1 January 1918
- Place of birth: Ottoman Empire
- Date of death: June 29, 1983 (aged 65)
- Positions: Wing-half; forward

Senior career*
Years	Team	Apps	(Gls)
1938–1948	Beşiktaş	137	(61)
Total		137	(61)
- * Club domestic league appearances and goals

Sabri Gençsoy (1 January 1918–29 June 1983) was a Turkish association football player. He took a part of Beşiktaş J.K. roster along with iconic players of club, including Hakkı Yeten, Hüsnü Savman, Şeref Görkey, and Eşref Bilgiç, in 1940s.

== Career ==
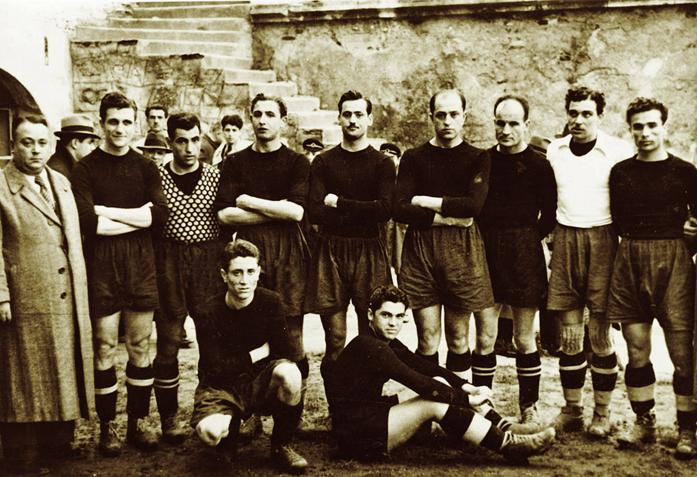
Sabri Gençsoy, 5th on back row at Beşiktaş roster, in 1941–42 season

Gençsoy spent his entire career at Beşiktaş J.K. between 1938 and 1948 where he achieved numerous local titles, including 3 times Turkish National Division, top-level national football competition between 1937 and 1950. He was the regular right-half of the team at 1938–39 and 1939–40 seasons. In 1940–41 season, along with Hakkı Yeten and Şeref Görkey, Gençsoy contributed the team with 28 goals combined.

== Honours ==
Beşiktaş

- Turkish National Division (3): 1941, 1944, 1947
- Istanbul Football League (7): 1938–39, 1939–40, 1940–41, 1941–42, 1942–43, 1944–45, 1945–46
- Istanbul Football Cup (2): 1944 1946
- Prime Minister's Cup (1): 1947
