= Eşref Bilgiç =

Turkish association football player (1908-1992)

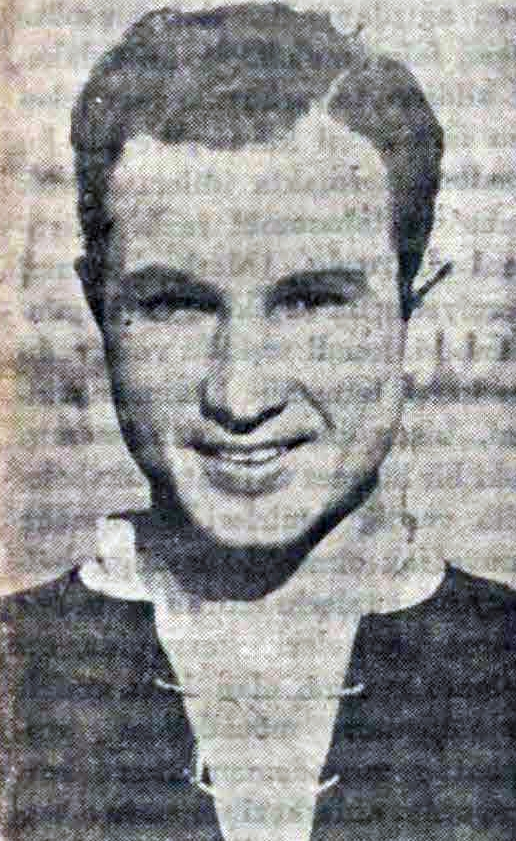

Personal information
- Full name: Eşref Bilgiç
- Date of birth: 14 November 1908
- Place of birth: Istanbul, Ottoman Empire
- Date of death: 9 December 1992 (aged 84)
- Place of death: Istanbul
- Position: Forward

Senior career*
Years	Team	Apps	(Gls)
1926–1947	Beşiktaş	219	(61)
1947–1948	İstanbulspor	2	(1)
Total		221	(62)

International career
1931–1932	Turkey	2	(1)

Managerial career
- 1952–1956: Kasımpaşa S.K.
- 1956–1957: Feriköy S.K.
- 1957: Beşiktaş
- * Club domestic league appearances and goals

Eşref Bilgiç (14 November 1908 – 9 December 1992) was a Turkish international association football player and manager. He represented Turkey at senior level in 2 international encounters.

== Career ==
Bilgiç spent almost his entire career at Beşiktaş J.K. between 1926 and 1947 where he achieved numerous local titles.

Bilgiç represented Turkey at senior level at two occasions, including one encounter at 1931 Balkan Cup against Yugoslavia, ended 2–0 in favour of Turkey. He scored once at friendly game against Bulgaria which ended 3–2 for Bulgaria on 4 November 1932.

Bilgiç managed Beşiktaş J.K. in 1957.

== Honours ==
=== Club ===
Beşiktaş

- Istanbul Football League (7): 1933–34, 1938–39, 1939–40, 1940–41, 1941–42, 1942–43, 1944–45
- Turkish National Division (1): 1941
- Istanbul Football Cup (1): 1944
- Prime Minister's Cup (1): 1944

=== International ===
- Balkan Cup Runner-up (1): 1931
