= 1942–43 Galatasaray S.K. season =

Galatasaray
1942–43 season
- President: (Turkey) Tevfik Ali Çınar (until 21 November 1942) (Turkey) Osman Dardağan
- Manager: (England) Bill Baggett
- Stadium: Fenerbahçe Stadı
- Istanbul Lig: 3rd
- Milli Küme: 2nd
- Istanbul Kupası: Winner
- Top goalscorer: League: Cemil Gürgen Erlertürk (22); All: Cemil Gürgen Erlertürk (23)
Home colours	Away colours

The 1942–43 season was Galatasaray SK's 39th in existence and the club's 31st consecutive season in the Istanbul Football League.

== Squad statistics ==
No.	Pos.	Name	IFL		MKŞ		IFK		Total	
No.	Pos.	Name	Apps	Goals	Apps	Goals	Apps	Goals	Apps	Goals
-	GK	(Turkey) Osman İncili	11	0	14	0	n/a	n/a	25	0
-	GK	(Turkey) Saim Kaur	2	0	0	0	n/a	n/a	2	0
-	DF	(Turkey) Salim Şatıroğlu (C)	12	0	12	0	n/a	n/a	24	0
-	DF	(Turkey) Faruk Barlas	12	0	13	0	n/a	n/a	25	0
-	DF	(Turkey) Mahmut Kefeli	8	3	1	0	n/a	n/a	9	3
-	DF	(Turkey) Adnan İncirmen	0	0	9	0	n/a	n/a	9	0
-	DF	(Turkey) Bülent Eken	3	1	13	10	n/a	n/a	16	11
-	MF	(Turkey) Kemal Öngü	10	0	0	0	n/a	n/a	10	0
-	MF	(Turkey) Arif Sevinç	9	2	14	2	n/a	n/a	23	4
-	MF	(Turkey) Mustafa Gençsoy	6	3	12	1	n/a	n/a	18	4
-	MF	(Turkey) Hikmet Ebcim	6	5	7	6	n/a	n/a	13	11
-	MF	(Turkey) Musa Sezer	5	0	0	0	n/a	n/a	5	0
-	MF	(Turkey) Enver Arslanalp	5	0	12	0	n/a	n/a	17	0
-	MF	(Turkey) Halil Burnaz	2	0	0	0	n/a	n/a	2	0
-	FW	(Turkey) Muzaffer Tokaç	13	6	2	0	n/a	n/a	15	6
-	FW	(Turkey) Cemil Gürgen Erlertürk	11	22	3	0	n/a	n/a	14	22
-	FW	(Turkey) Gazanfer Olcayto	10	8	4	0	n/a	n/a	14	8
-	FW	(Turkey) Orhan Canpolat	8	1	14	3	n/a	n/a	22	4
-	FW	(Turkey) Gündüz Kılıç	6	5	14	3	n/a	n/a	20	8
-	FW	(Turkey) Eşfak Aykaç	2	0	3	1	n/a	n/a	5	1
-	FW	(Turkey) Sarafim Madenli	1	0	0	0	n/a	n/a	1	0
-	FW	(Turkey) Barbaros Olcayto	1	0	0	0	n/a	n/a	1	0
-	FW	(Turkey) Sabri Gençay	0	0	0	0	n/a	n/a	0	0
-	FW	(Turkey) Şahap Turgan	0	0	7	6	n/a	n/a	7	6

== Squad changes for the 1942–1943 season ==
In:

== Competitions ==
=== Istanbul Football League ===
==== Classification ====
Pos	Team	Pld	W	D	L	GF	GA	GD	Pts
1	Beşiktaş JK	18	18	0	0	81	9	+72	36
2	Fenerbahçe SK	4	1	1	2	69	15	+54	31 (Note: 28 bonus points?)
3	Galatasaray SK	18	12	2	4	60	19	+41	26
4	Vefa SK	18	10	2	6	49	35	+14	22
5	İstanbulspor	18	8	3	7	37	43	−6	19
6	Beykoz 1908 S.K.D.	18	5	6	7	29	32	−3	16
7	Kasımpaşa SK	18	4	2	12	26	70	−44	10
8	Davutpaşa SK	18	3	2	13	22	62	−40	8
9	Küçükçekmece SK	18	2	4	12	26	68	−42	8
10	Taksim SK	24	2	6	16	22	68	−46	4 (Note: 6 points deducted?)

==== Matches ====
Kick-off listed in local time (EEST)

13 September 1942 1	Galatasaray SK	5–0	Davutpaşa SK	Istanbul
14:00	Cemil Gürgen Erlertürk 20', 34' (pen.), 72'; Hikmet Ebcim 53'; Gazanfer Olcayto 64'	(Report)		Stadium: Fenerbahçe Stadı; Referee: Şekip Akduman

20 September 1942 2	Beşiktaş JK	3–0	Galatasaray SK	Istanbul
	awarded 3-0	(Report)

27 September 1942 3	Fenerbahçe SK	3–0	Galatasaray SK	Istanbul
14:00	awarded 3-0	(Report)

11 October 1942 4	Galatasaray SK	8–0	Taksim SK	Istanbul
13:30	Cemil Gürgen Erlertürk 5', 19', 37', 61', 77', 84'; Mustafa Gençsoy 26'; Hikmet Ebcim 42'	(Report)		Stadium: Fenerbahçe Stadı; Referee: Samih Duransoy

18 October 1942 5	Galatasaray SK	4–0	Küçükçekmece SK	Istanbul
13:30	Cemil Gürgen Erlertürk 25', 59'; Mustafa Gençsoy 32'; Bülent Eken 81'	(Report)		Stadium: Fenerbahçe Stadı; Referee: Sami Açıköney

25 October 1942 6	Galatasaray SK	4–1	Beykoz 1908 S.K.D.	Istanbul
13:30	Mustafa Gençsoy 12'; Mehmet Pekin 71' (o.g.); Muzaffer Tokaç 72', 79'	(Report)	Hamdi Tekin 86'	Stadium: Fenerbahçe Stadı; Referee: Tarık Özerengin

8 November 1942 7	Kasımpaşa SK	0–5	Galatasaray SK	Istanbul
13:30		(Report)	Cemil Gürgen Erlertürk 4'; Gazanfer Olcayto 17', 39'; Hikmet Ebcim 32', 66'	Stadium: Fenerbahçe Stadı; Referee: Adnan Akın

15 November 1942 8	Galatasaray SK	3–1	Vefa SK	Istanbul
15:00	Cemil Gürgen Erlertürk 5', 35'; Muzaffer Tokaç 46'	(Report)	Şükrü Demircioğlu 61'	Stadium: Fenerbahçe Stadı; Referee: Tarık Özerengin

22 November 1942 9	Galatasaray SK	7–1	İstanbulspor	Istanbul
15:00	Cemil Gürgen Erlertürk 9', 80'; Muzaffer Tokaç 22' (pen.); Mahmut Kefeli 43', 63', 72'; Gazanfer Olcayto 87'	(Report)	Viktor Venüs 15'	Stadium: Fenerbahçe Stadı; Referee: Şazi Tezcan

20 December 1942 10	Davutpaşa SK	1–1	Galatasaray SK	Istanbul
	Orhan Sümbüloğlu 13'	(Report)	Cemil Gürgen Erlertürk 38'	Stadium: Şeref Stadı; Referee: Selami Akal

27 December 1942 11	Galatasaray SK	0–3	Beşiktaş JK	Istanbul
		(Report)	awarded 0-3

3 January 1943 12	Galatasaray SK	0–3	Fenerbahçe SK	Istanbul
		(Report)	awarded 0-3

24 January 1943 13	Küçükçekmece SK	1–4	Galatasaray SK	Istanbul
	Burhan Özgenç 77' (pen.)	(Report)	Muzaffer Tokaç 36', 87'; Hikmet Ebcim 38'; Gündüz Kılıç 84'	Stadium: Şeref Stadı; Referee: Halit Galip Ezgü

14 February 1943 14	Galatasaray SK	8–0	Kasımpaşa SK	Istanbul
13:30	Cemil Gürgen Erlertürk 9', 79', 88'; Gündüz Kılıç 30'; Arif Sevinç 35', 83'; Gazanfer Olcayto 65' (pen.), 77'	(Report)		Stadium: Şeref Stadı; Referee: Sami Açıköney

21 February 1943 15	Vefa SK	0–2	Galatasaray SK	Istanbul
15:30		(Report)	Gündüz Kılıç 37', 42'	Stadium: Şeref Stadı; Referee: Tarık Özerengin

28 February 1943 16	İstanbulspor	1–4	Galatasaray SK	Istanbul
13:30	Rüştü 48'	(Report)	Gündüz Kılıç 42'; Cemil Gürgen Erlertürk 76', 80'; Gazanfer Olcayto 88'	Stadium: Şeref Stadı; Referee: Muzaffer Çizer

7 March 1943 17	Beykoz 1908 S.K.D.	1–1	Galatasaray SK	Istanbul
11:30	Şahap Yengingüç 61'	(Report)	Orhan Canpolat 55'	Stadium: Şeref Stadı; Referee: Sami Açıköney

10 March 1943 18	Taksim SK	0–3	Galatasaray SK	Istanbul
		(Report)	awarded 0-3	Stadium: Şeref Stadı

=== Milli Küme ===
==== Classification ====
Pos	Team	Pld	W	D	L	GF	GA	GAv	Pts
1	Fenerbahçe	14	11	2	1	30	6	5.000	24
2	Galatasaray	14	11	1	2	32	7	4.571	23
3	Beşiktaş	14	9	0	5	47	20	2.350	18
4	Ankara Demirspor	14	7	2	5	29	29	1.000	16
5	Vefa	14	5	1	8	23	35	0.657	11
6	Gençlerbirliği	14	4	1	9	23	31	0.742	9
7	UDV Göztepe	14	3	3	8	12	35	0.343	9
8	Altınordu	14	1	0	13	16	49	0.327	2

Source: angelfire.com and rsssf.com

==== Matches ====
14 March 1943 1	Galatasaray SK	0–0	Fenerbahçe SK	Istanbul
16:00		(Report)		Stadium: Şeref Stadı; Referee: Tarık Özerengin

20 March 1943 2	Ankara Demirspor	1–0	Galatasaray SK	Ankara
14:00	Hamdi 84'	(Report)		Stadium: Ankara 19 Mayıs Stadium; Referee: Ziya Ozan

21 March 1943 3	Gençlerbirliği SK	0–1	Galatasaray SK	Ankara
16:00		(Report)	Gündüz Kılıç 6'	Stadium: Ankara 19 Mayıs Stadium; Referee: İhsan Tülmen

4 April 1943 4	Beşiktaş JK	1–3	Galatasaray SK	Istanbul
16:30	Cahit Yıldırım 2'	(Report)	Şahap Turgan 56'; Gündüz Kılıç 71'; Hikmet Ebcim 81'	Stadium: Şeref Stadı; Referee: Şazi Tezcan

11 April 1943 5	Galatasaray SK	3–0	Vefa SK	Istanbul
14:30	Şahap Turgan 3'; Hikmet Ebcim 69'; Arif Sevinç 88'	(Report)		Stadium: Fenerbahçe Stadı; Referee: Kemal Halim Gürgen

17 April 1943 6	Galatasaray SK	3–0	Ankara Demirspor	Istanbul
17:00	Orhan Canpolat 29'; Arif Sevinç 31'; Şahap Turgan 41'	(Report)		Stadium: Şeref Stadı; Referee: Sami Açıköney

18 April 1943 7	Galatasaray SK	2–1	Gençlerbirliği	Istanbul
15:00	Bülent Eken 12'; Orhan Canpolat 49'	(Report)	Faruk Barlas 29' (o.g.)	Stadium: Fenerbahçe Stadı; Referee: Şazi Tezcan

24 April 1943 8	Galatasaray SK	1–0	Göztepe SK	Istanbul
15:00	Eşfak Aykaç 29'	(Report)		Stadium: Şeref Stadı; Referee: Samih Duransoy

25 April 1943 9	Galatasaray SK	4–0	Altınordu S.K.	Istanbul
17:00	Bülent Eken 9', 12', 57'; Gündüz Kılıç 29'	(Report)		Stadium: Fenerbahçe Stadı; Referee: Tarık Özerengin

1 May 1943 10	Göztepe SK	0–4	Galatasaray SK	İzmir
15:30		(Report)	Bülent Eken 20', 70'; Mustafa Gençsoy 30'; Hikmet Ebcim 60'	Stadium: Alsancak Stadi; Referee: Fehmi Eriş

2 May 1943 11	Altınordu S.K.	2–4	Galatasaray SK	İzmir
17:00	Sait Altınordu 40', 63'	(Report)	Bülent Eken 3', 8', 31', 54'	Stadium: Alsancak Stadi; Referee: Ferit Simsaroğlu

9 May 1943 12	Fenerbahçe SK	1–0	Galatasaray SK	Istanbul
17:00	Naci Bastoncu 3'	(Report)		Stadium: Fenerbahçe Stadı; Referee: Şazi Tezcan

16 May 1943 13	Galatasaray SK	3–1	Beşiktaş JK	Istanbul
17:00	Şahap Turgan 24'; Hikmet Ebcim 60'; Orhan Canpolat 73'	(Report)	Kemal Gülçelik 3'	Stadium: Fenerbahçe Stadı; Referee: Sami Açıköney

19 May 1943 14	Vefa SK	0–4	Galatasaray SK	Istanbul
14:45		(Report)	Hikmet Ebcim 56', 66'; Şahap Turgan 62', 84'	Stadium: Şeref Stadı; Referee: Şazi Tezcan

=== Istanbul Futbol Kupası ===
==== Matches ====
1 October 1943 Final	Galatasaray SK	3–1	Beşiktaş JK	Istanbul
	Gündüz Kılıç (?); Cemil Gürgen Erlertürk (?)	(Report)	Kemal Gülçelik (?)
