= 1921–22 Beşiktaş J.K. season =

Beşiktaş J.K.
1921–21 season
- President: Fuat Balkan
- Manager: Şeref Bey
- Stadium: Taksim Stadium
- İstanbul Sports League: 1st (3rd Title)

The 1921–22 season was the 3rd official season of Beşiktaş J.K. After the İstanbul Sports League was canceled, Beşiktaş played in the İstanbul Sunday League for one season, because it was also the last year of the Ottoman Empire. Beşiktaş competed along with 6 other teams.

== Season ==
Pos	Club
1	Beşiktaş J.K.
2	Makabi
3	Pera
4	İttihat S.K.
5	Stella
6	Enosis
7	Strugglers
