= 1919–20 Beşiktaş J.K. season =

Beşiktaş J.K.
1919–20 season
- President: Fuat Balkan
- Manager: Şeref Bey
- Stadium: Dolmabahçe Field
- İstanbul Sports League: 1st

The 1919–20 season was Beşiktaş' first official football season. They competed with 11 other teams in the İstanbul Sports League. They finished first place, winning their first ever official league championship.

== Season ==
Pos	Club
1	Beşiktaş J.K. (C)
2	Hilal S.K.
3	Kumkapı S.K.
4	Bakırköy S.K.
5	Türkgücü
6	Topkapı S.K.
7	Darüşşafaka S.K.
8	Vefa S.K.
9	Üsküdar
10	Beylerbeyi S.K.
11	Haliç S.K.
12	Nişantaşı S.K.
