= 1922–23 Beşiktaş J.K. season =

Beşiktaş J.K.
1922–23 season
- President: Fuat Balkan
- Manager: Şeref Bey
- Stadium: Taksim Stadium

The 1922–23 season for Beşiktaş did not involve any football tournaments or leagues due to the Turkish Independence War. Most of the players (if not all) fought in the war. The president and manager were still the same.
