= 1920–21 Beşiktaş J.K. season =

Beşiktaş J.K.
1920–21 season
- President: Fuat Balkan
- Manager: Şeref Bey
- Stadium: Dolmabahçe Field
- Istanbul Sports League: 1st

The 1920–21 season was the 2nd official football season for the club. They competed against 9 other teams in the Istanbul Sports League. As the defending champions, they came 1st place in their group and defeated Darüssafaka in the final, earning their 2nd ever championship.

== Season ==
In the Istanbul Sports League there were 2 groups: Group A and Group B. Beşiktaş was in group A.

=== Group A ===
Pos	Club
1	Beşiktaş J.K.
2	Hilal S.K.
3	Kumkapı S.K.
4	Altınörs S.K.
5	Türkgücü

=== Final ===
1921	Beşiktaş (Ottoman Empire)	2 – 0	(Ottoman Empire) Darüşşafaka	Istanbul, Ottoman Empire
	Hüsnü, İhsan Celal	www.macanilari.com/getir.php?fid=191919204610		Stadium: Taksim Stadium; Attendance: ??? Referee: ???
