= Cemil Gürgen Erlertürk =

Turkish footballer and sailplane pilot

Cemil Erlertürk
Personal information
- Full name: Cemil Gürgen Erlertürk
- Date of birth: 1918
- Place of birth: İzmir, Ottoman Empire
- Date of death: 3 May 1970 (aged 52)
- Place of death: Istanbul, Turkey
- Position: Striker

Senior career*
Years	Team	Apps	(Gls)
?–1938	Altay SK		
1938–1944	Galatasaray SK	72	(86)
1944–1945	Angoulême CFC		
?–1952	Galatasaray SK	6	(1)
- * Club domestic league appearances and goals

Cemil Gürgen Erlertürk (1918 – 3 May 1970) was a Turkish footballer and Sailplane pilot.

== Career ==
=== Football ===
Cemil Gürgen Erlertürk was born in İzmir and played six seasons as forward for Galatasaray SK. In 1931 he visited Galatasaray SK and asked to join the team. He was not selected to the team. Cemil Gürgen Erlertürk has never won the Istanbul Football League with Galatasaray, although he became top scorer of the Istanbul Football League. In 1939-40 he scored 30 goals in 16 games. He was the first and only player to score 30+ goals. Three seasons later, in the 1942-43 season, he scored 22 goals in 11 games which makes a rate of 2.00 goals / game. First and only player to reach such a high rate in the Istanbul League. Alexander Nikólaos Vafiadis, nicknamed Boduri, was famous for assisting most of his goals. Since Boduri had been tackled hard before his assists to Cemil Erlertürk, Boduri called Cemil Katır ("Mule") and Katır became Cemil Gürgen's nickname. Cemil scored 12 goals at the Intercontinental Derby and his four goals against Fenerbahçe in 1939 are still a record the most goals by a player in a match (shared).

=== Sailplane ===
Cemil Gürgen Erlertürk was also a sailplane pilot.

=== University of Illinois ===
In 1955 he moved to United States to become football coach at the University of Illinois.

== Honours ==
=== As player ===
- Galatasaray SK
  - Istanbul Football Cup: 2
    - 1942, 1943
