= 1923–24 Beşiktaş J.K. season =

Beşiktaş J.K.
1923–24 season
- President: Salih Bey
- Manager: Şeref Bey
- Stadium: Taksim Stadium
- Istanbul Football League: 1st
- Turkish Football Cup: Runner-up

The 1923–24 season was the 4th official football season for Beşiktaş J.K. They played in the new Istanbul Football League, in the newly formed Turkish Republic. Beşiktaş played along with the 2 other "İstanbul Giants": Fenerbahçe S.K. and Galatasaray S.K. for the first time ever. Beşiktaş qualified for the playoffs, defeated Süleymanie S.K. in the semi-finals and Galatasaray S.K. in the final, to become the first ever champion. It was the club's 4th official football championship. Beşiktaş also became the runner up in the first ever Istanbul Football Championship, losing to Harbiye S.K. 0–2.

== Kit ==
Beşiktaş used their original black and white kit.

== Season ==
=== Istanbul Football League ===
Beşiktaş, Galatasaray, Süleymaniye and Fenerbahçe qualified for the playoffs by finishing in the top 4.

==== Semi finals ====
1924	Beşiktaş (Turkey)	3 – 1	(Turkey) Süleymanie S.K.	Istanbul, Turkey
				Stadium: Taksim Stadium; Attendance: ??? Referee: ???

==== Final ====
1924	Beşiktaş (Turkey)	2 – 0	(Turkey) Galatasaray	Istanbul, Turkey
				Stadium: Taksim Stadium; Attendance: ??? Referee: ???

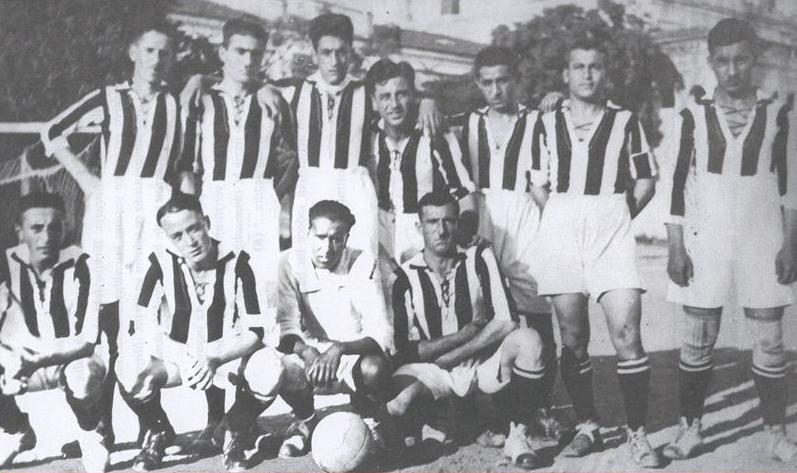
Istanbul League – Besiktas JK 1923–24 Champion

=== Turkish Football Championship ===
Beşiktaş also played Harbiye for the Turkish Football championship, but lost.

1924	Harbiye S.K. (Turkey)	2 – 0	(Turkey) Beşiktaş	Istanbul, Turkey
				Stadium: Taksim Stadium; Attendance: ??? Referee: ???

Pre-Season

Beşiktaş (Turkey)	0 – 1	(Croatia) Dinamo Zagreb

Beşiktaş (Turkey)	2 – 0	(Turkey) Beylerbeyi

Beşiktaş (Turkey)	2 – 0	(Turkey) Vefa

Beşiktaş (Turkey)	1 – 1	(Turkey) Bursa Karması

Beşiktaş (Turkey)	0 – 4	(Turkey) Fenerbahçe
