= 1947 Istanbul Football Cup =

Istanbul Football Cup
- Season: 1947
- Champions: None

The 1947 Istanbul Football Cup season was the fifth season of the cup. The tournament was single-elimination. The final match between Fenerbahçe SK and Beşiktaş JK was never played.

== Season ==
=== Quarterfinals ===
Team 1	Score	Team 2
Beşiktaş JK (Turkey)	13-0	(Turkey) Rumelihisarı SK
Fenerbahçe SK (Turkey)	9-0	(Turkey) Unkapanı SK

Team 1	Score	Team 2
Beşiktaş JK (Turkey)	5-0	(Turkey) Anadolu Hisarı İdman Yurdu SK
Fenerbahçe SK (Turkey)	2-2	(Turkey) Emniyet SK
Fenerbahçe SK (Turkey)	4-0	(Turkey) Emniyet SK

=== Semifinals ===
Team 1	Score	Team 2
Galatasaray SK (Turkey)	1-3	(Turkey) Fenerbahçe SK
Beşiktaş JK (Turkey)	3-1	(Turkey) Süleymaniye FC

=== Final ===
*Never played

Team 1	Score	Team 2
Beşiktaş JK (Turkey)	Never played	(Turkey) Fenerbahçe SK
