= 1942 Istanbul Football Cup =

Istanbul Football Cup
- Season: 1942
- Champions: Galatasaray (1st title)

The 1942 Istanbul Football Cup season was the first season of the cup. Galatasaray won the cup for the first time. The tournament was single-elimination.

== Season ==
=== 1/8 Finals ===
Team 1	Score	Team 2
Galatasaray (Turkey)	4–1	(Turkey) Anadolu Hisarı İdman Yurdu SK
Fenerbahçe SK (Turkey)	11–0	(Turkey) İstiklal SK
Galatasaray (Turkey)	11–0	(Turkey) Unkapanı SK

=== Quarterfinals ===
Team 1	Score	Team 2
Fenerbahçe SK (Turkey)	1–0	(Turkey) Vefa SK
Galatasaray (Turkey)	5–0	(Turkey) Kasımpaşa SK

=== Semifinals ===
Team 1	Score	Team 2
Fenerbahçe SK (Turkey)	1–0	(Turkey) İstanbulspor
Galatasaray (Turkey)	3–2	(Turkey) Beşiktaş JK

=== Final ===
15 March 1942

Team 1	Score	Team 2
Galatasaray (Turkey)	5–0	(Turkey) Fenerbahçe SK

== Match details ==
15 March 1942
15:00

Galatasaray	5–0	Fenerbahçe
Hikmet Sarı 4', 77'; Gündüz Kılıç 37', 88'; Cemil Gürgen Erlertürk 25'	Report

Şeref Stadium, Istanbul
Referee: Sami Açıköney

Galatasaray SK	Fenerbahçe SK

Galatasaray SK:
GK	1	(Turkey) Osman İncili
RB	2	(Turkey) Faruk Barlas
CB	3	(Turkey) Salim Şatıroğlu (c)
CB	4	(Turkey) Eşfak Aykaç
LB	5	(Turkey) Enver Arslanalp
RM	6	(Turkey) Mustafa Gençsoy
CM	7	(Turkey) Gazanfer Olcayto
CM	8	(Turkey) Gündüz Kılıç
CM	9	(Turkey) Arif Sevinç
CM	10	(Turkey) Cemil Gürgen Erlertürk
CM	11	(Turkey) Hikmet Sarı
Substitutes:
Manager:
(England) Bill Baggett

Fenerbahçe SK:
GK	1	(Turkey) Nuri Pekesen
RB	2	(Turkey) Murat Alyüz (c)
CB	3	(Turkey) Muammer Oraman
CB	4	(Turkey) Aydın Bakanoğlu
LB	5	(Turkey) Zeynel Üner
RM	6	(Turkey) Ömer Boncuk
CM	7	(Turkey) Naci Bastoncu
CM	8	(Turkey) Esat Kaner
LM	9	(Turkey) Melih Kotanca
CF	10	(Turkey) İbrahim İskeçe
CF	11	(Turkey) Fikret Arıcan
Substitutes:
Manager:
(England) John Prayer

Match officials

- Assistant referees:
  - Unknown
  - Unknown

Match rules

- 90 minutes
