= Istanbul Cup =

Istanbul Cup may refer to:

- İstanbul Cup, a WTA 250 tennis tournament
- Istanbul Cup (figure skating), a figure skating competition
- Istanbul Football Cup, a football competition
