= 1943 Istanbul Football Cup =

Istanbul Football Cup
- Season: 1943
- Champions: Galatasaray (2nd Title)

The 1943 Istanbul Football Cup season was the second season of the cup. Galatasaray won the cup for the second time. The tournament was single-elimination.

== Season ==
=== Final ===
October 1, 1943

Team 1	Score	Team 2
Galatasaray (Turkey)	3-1	(Turkey) Beşiktaş JK

Goals for Galatasaray: Gündüz Kılıç(2), Cemil Gürgen Erlertürk Goals for Beşiktaş: Kemal Gülçelik
