= Önder Karaveli =

Turkish football coach and former player

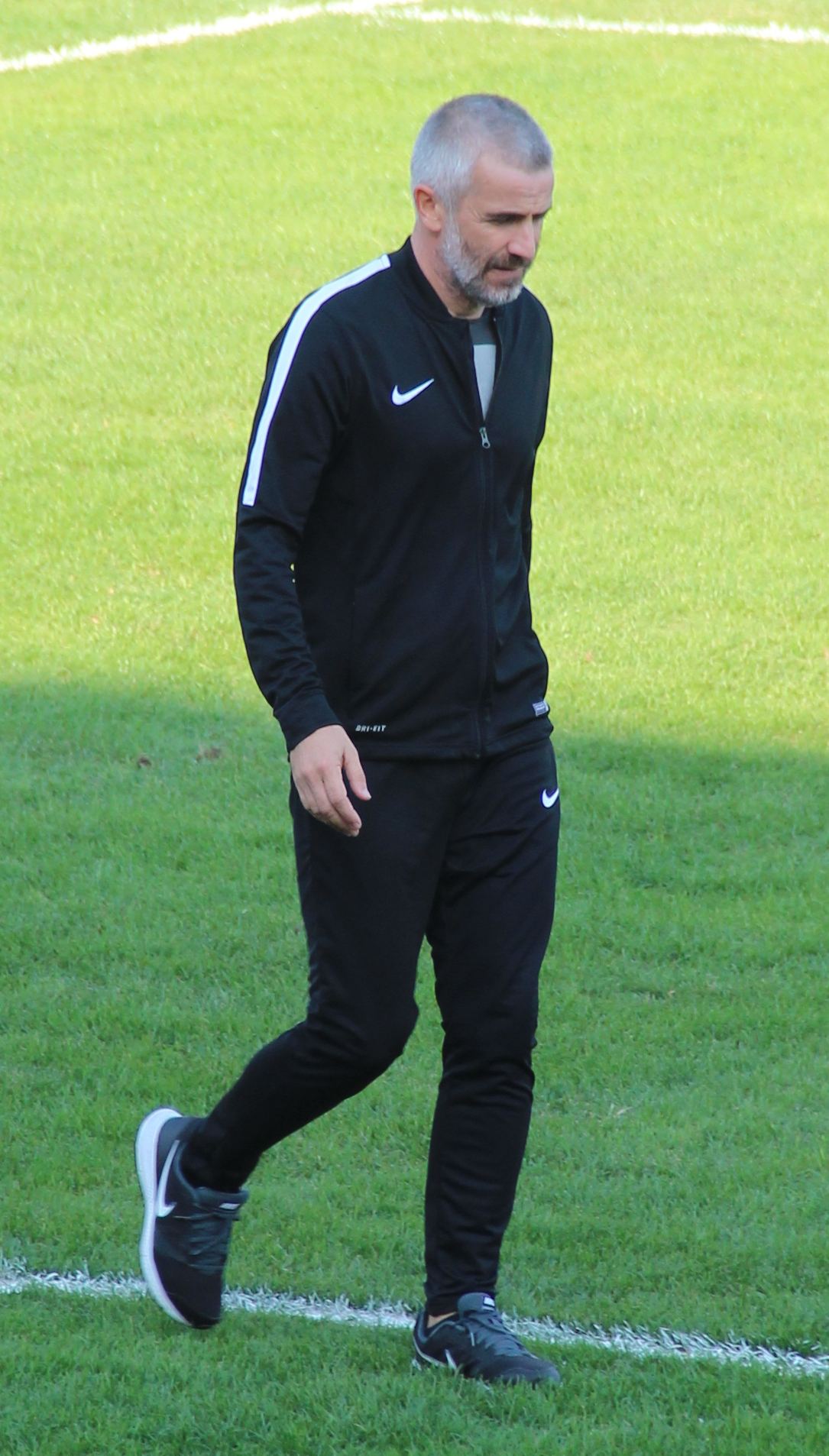

Personal information
- Date of birth: 26 March 1974 (age 52)
- Place of birth: Istanbul, Turkey
- Height: 1.84 m (6 ft 0 in)
- Position: Midfielder

Youth career
- Beşiktaş

Senior career*
Years	Team	Apps	(Gls)
1997	Üsküdar Anadolu		
1998	Mersin İdman Yurdu		
1998–1999	Edirnespor		

Managerial career
- 2001-2004: Beşiktaş Özkaynak
- 2004–2005: Beşiktaş U 19
- 2005–2006: Beşiktaş U 17
- 2006–2007: Beşiktaş U 21
- 2007-2008: Siirtspor
- 2009-2012: Kasımpaşa U 21
- 2012–2013: Beşiktaş U 21
- 2015-2016: Başakşehir (youth)
- 2016–2017: Çanakkale Dardanelspor
- 2018–2019: Başakşehir U 21
- 2019–2020: Başakşehir U 19
- 2020–2021: Qarabağ U-19
- 2021–2022: Beşiktaş U 19
- 2021–2022: Beşiktaş (interim)
- 2022: Beşiktaş
- 2022: Beşiktaş (assistant)
- 2022: Beşiktaş (Youth Development Director)
- 2022: Adanaspor
- 2023: 68 Yeni Aksarayspor
- * Club domestic league appearances and goals

Önder Karaveli (born 26 March 1974) is a Turkish football coach and former player who most recently managed Adanaspor.

== Honours ==
=== Manager ===
Beşiktaş

- Turkish Super Cup: 2021

== Managerial statistics ==
As of 11 November 2022

Team	From	To	Record				
Team	From	To	G	W	D	L	Win %
Beşiktaş	13 January 2022	25 March 2022	19	7	9	3	36.84
Adanaspor	27 September 2022	11 November 2022	8	3	1	4	37.50
Total			27	10	10	7	37.04
