= Ziya Taner =

Turkish football manager (1924–2001)

Personal information
- Date of birth: 1924
- Place of birth: Skopje, Yugoslavia
- Date of death: 17 July 2001 (aged 77)
- Place of death: Istanbul, Turkey

Managerial career
- Years: Team
- 1959–1960: İstanbulspor
- 1960–1961: Ankaragücü
- 1962–1966: Ankaragücü
- 1966–1970: İstanbulspor
- 1970–1971: Türk Telekom GSK
- 1971–1974: Ankaragücü
- 1978–1979: Eskişehirspor
- 1983–1984: Beşiktaş (assistant manager)
- 1984: Beşiktaş

Ziya Taner (1924–2001) was a Turkish football manager.

== Career ==
Taner managed Ankaragücü, leading the club to a runner-up finish in the 1972–73 Turkish Cup. He also managed Ankaragücü in the 1972–73 European Cup Winners' Cup, where the club was defeated in the first round by eventual runner-up Leeds United.

Taner was an assistant manager to Đorđe Milić at Beşiktaş during the 1983–84 season, and when Milić was dismissed in April 1984, Taner became club manager for the remainder of the season. Branko Stanković replaced Taner for the following season.

== Personal ==
Taner's son, Ercan, is a Turkish TV presenter.

== Honours ==
İstanbulspor

- TFF First League: 1967–68

Ankaragücü

- Turkish Cup: 1971–72; runner-up 1972–73

Beşiktaş

- Turkish Cup runner-up: 1983–84
