= Mehmet Şamil Bey =

Turkish diplomat, journalist and sports executive

Mehmet Şamil Şhaplı
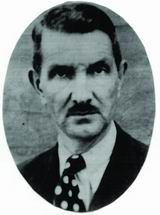

1st President of Beşiktaş JK
- In office 1903–1908
- Succeeded by: Şükrü Pasha (1908)

Personal details
- Born: Osman Paşazade Mehmet Şamil; 1891 Medina, Ottoman Empire (modern Saudi Arabia)
- Died: February 7, 1957 (aged 66) Istanbul, Turkey
- Resting place: Eyüp Cemetery
- Citizenship: Turkish
- Parent: Şhaplı Osman Ferit Paşa (father)
- Relatives: Hüseyin Bereket Bey, another founding member of Beşiktaş J.K. (brother)
- Education: Lycée Saint-Joseph; University of Geneva
- Known for: Founding member and First president of Beşiktaş J.K.

Mehmet Şamil Bey (born Osman Paşazade Mehmet Şamil, Mehmet Şamil Şhaplı following Surname Law; 1891 – 2 February 1957), was a Turkish diplomat, journalist and sports executive, who was one of 22 founding members (Note: According to Gürel Yurttaş' study, number of founding members were 26.) and first president of Turkish sports club Beşiktaş J.K. His presidency lasted 5 years between 1903 and 1908.

== Biography ==
Şhaplı, of Circassian descent, was born as Osman Paşazade Mehmet Şamil in 1891 in Medina, Ottoman Empire (today's Saudi Arabia), as the eldest of 11 siblings of Şhaplı Osman Ferit Pasha and Emire Nefiset Hanım. Osman Ferit Pasha (born in Dagestan), is a descendant of Şhaplı Kubilayko Mahomet Bey, a military figure of Ubykh Tribe in Sochi. Emire Nefiset Hanım is the granddaughter of Shamil, 3rd Imam of Dagestan, the political, military, and spiritual leader of Caucasian resistance to Imperial Russia in the 1800s. Parents of Mehmet Şamil met in Medina, when Osman Ferit Pasha was serving as Shaykh al-Haram of Medina, Ottoman Empire.

Due to the new appointment of Osman Ferit Pasha as commander of Taşkışla Military Barracks, the time also when he finished his primary school education, Mehmet Şamil moved to Istanbul with his family, where he studied at Lycée Saint-Joseph, Istanbul.

In 1902 Autumn, a group of young athletics practitioners including Mehmet Şamil and his brother Hüseyin Bereket used to train gymnastics, weight lifting, wrestling at Şeyhhül Harem Osman Paşa Konağı, Serencebey Neighbourhood, Beşiktaş District of Istanbul. Shortly after in 1902, the group were taken into custody since it was İstibdat period of Ottoman Empire and playing football was prohibited, however they have been released following unfolded fact that they were practising athletics, individually -rather than playing football. On contrary, Şehzade Abdülhalim, son of Süleyman Selim Efendi, and grandson of Emperor Abdulmejid, appointed Kenan Bey, a then-well-known boxer and wrestler.

In 1903, the Group founded "Beşiktaş Bereket Jimnastik Kulübü" (Note: Also referred to as "Bereketiko Jimnastik Kulübü" at Circassian-based sources.) (later registered as Beşiktaş Jimnastik Kulübü in 1911).

Following death of his father, Mehmet Şamil moved to Geneva, Switzerland, where he studied Political Science at University of Geneva.

Taken "Şhaplı" as surname following 1934 Surname Law, Mehmet Şamil Şhaplı died on 7 February 1957 in Istanbul. Following his death ceremony at Teşvikiye Mosque, he was buried in Eyüp Cemetery, next to his father's grave.

Honorary titles
Preceded by None	President of Beşiktaş JK; 1903–1908	Succeeded by Şükrü Pasha
