= Rushdi =

- Gender: Male

Origin
- Language: Arabic
- Meaning: Mature, or wise

Other names
- Variant form: Rüştü
- Anglicisations: Rushdie, Rushdy

Rushdi (Arabic: رشدي, IPA: [ruʃˈdiː]) is a masculine Arabic given name, it may refer to:

== Given name ==
- Rushdy Abaza (1926–1980), Egyptian actor
- Rushdy Armanios (born 1963), Egyptian boxer
- Rushdi Jappie (born 1985), South African cricketer
- Rushdi al-Kikhya (1899–1987), Syrian political leader
- Rushdi Said (1920–2013), Egyptian geologist
- Rushdi al-Shawa (1889–1965), Palestinian politician
- Ruzhdi Kerimov (born 1956), Bulgarian footballer

== Surname and family name ==
- Ahmed Rushdi (politician) (1924–2013), Egyptian politician
- Ahmed Rushdi (1934–1983), Pakistani singer
- Hasan Rushdy (born 1971), Sri Lankan cricketer
- Hussein Rushdi Pasha (1863–1928), Egyptian politician
- Mehmed Rushdi Pasha (1811–1882), Ottoman statesman
- Natalie Rushdie (born 1986), British jazz singer
- Salman Rushdie (born 1947), Indian-British novelist

== See also ==
- Rüştü, Turkish form
