= Rüştü =

Rüştü is a Turkish name, a form of the name Rushdi of Arabic origin, and may refer to:

== Given name ==
=== First name ===
- Rüştü Erdelhun (1894–1983), Turkish army general
- Rüştü Hanlı (born 1997), Turkish football player
- Rüştü Nuran (born 1976), Turkish basketball referee and surgeon
- Rüştü Pasha (1872–1926), officer of the Ottoman Army and general of the Turkish Army
- Rüştü Reçber (born 1973), Turkish football player
- Rüştü Sakarya (1877–1951), Turkish army general

=== Middle name ===
- İsmail Rüştü Aksal (1911–89), Turkish civil servant and politician
- Tevfik Rüştü Aras (1883–1972), Turkish politician
- Mehmet Rüştü Başaran (born 1946/47), Turkish businessman
- Fatin Rüştü Zorlu (1910–1961), Turkish diplomat and politician

== See also ==
- Rushdi
