= 1946 Istanbul Football Cup =

Istanbul Football Cup
- Season: 1946
- Champions: Beşiktaş JK (2nd Title)

The 1946 Istanbul Football Cup season was the fourth season of the cup. Beşiktaş JK won the cup for the second time. The tournament was single-elimination.

== Season ==
=== Quarterfinals ===
Team 1	Score	Team 2
Beşiktaş JK (Turkey)	8-0	(Turkey) Beyoğluspor
Fenerbahçe SK (Turkey)	0-1	(Turkey) İstanbulspor

Team 1	Score	Team 2
Beşiktaş JK (Turkey)	3-0	(Turkey) İstanbulspor

=== Semifinals ===
Team 1	Score	Team 2
Galatasaray SK (Turkey)	2-3	(Turkey) Beykozspor

=== Final ===
The cup took place on February 17, 1946. Around 10,000 people attended at the Şeref Stadium.

Team 1	Score	Team 2
Beşiktaş JK (Turkey)	5-2	(Turkey) Beykoz 1908 S.K.D.
