= 1944 Istanbul Football Cup =

Istanbul Football Cup
- Season: 1944
- Champions: Beşiktaş JK (1st Title)

The 1944 Istanbul Football Cup season was the third season of the cup. Beşiktaş JK won the cup for the first time. The tournament was single-elimination.

== Season ==
=== Quarterfinals ===
Team 1	Score	Team 2
Beşiktaş JK (Turkey)	19-0	(Turkey) İstiklal SK
Fenerbahçe SK (Turkey)	6-1	(Turkey) Taksim SK

Team 1	Score	Team 2
Beşiktaş JK (Turkey)	16-0	(Turkey) Sarıyer G.K.
Fenerbahçe SK (Turkey)	5-0	(Turkey) Beyoğluspor

=== Semifinals ===
Team 1	Score	Team 2
Beşiktaş JK (Turkey)	1-1	(Turkey) Galatasaray SK
Galatasaray SK (Turkey)	0-1	(Turkey) Beşiktaş JK

Team 1	Score	Team 2
Fenerbahçe SK (Turkey)	3-0	(Turkey) Vefa SK
Vefa SK (Turkey)	?-?	(Turkey) Fenerbahçe SK

=== Final ===
The cup took place on September 10, 1944. Around 10,000 people attended at the Şeref Stadium.

Team 1	Score	Team 2
Beşiktaş JK (Turkey)	3-1	(Turkey) Fenerbahçe SK

Goals for Beşiktaş JK: Sabri Gençsoy(28 min.), Hakkı Yeten(50 min.), Vecdi Çapa(53 min.)

Goals for Fenerbahçe SK: Müzdat Yetkiner(18 min.)
