= 1944–45 Istanbul Football League =

Istanbul Football League
- Season: 1944–45
- Champions: Beşiktaş JK (8th title)

The 1944–45 İstanbul Football League season was the 37th season of the league. Beşiktaş JK won the league for the 8th time.

== Season ==
Pos	Team	Pld	W	D	L	GF	GA	GD	Pts
1	Beşiktaş JK	18	16	2	0	70	10	+60	34
2	Fenerbahçe SK	18	14	2	2	58	10	+48	30
3	Galatasaray SK	18	12	4	2	57	21	+36	28
4	Beykoz 1908 S.K.D.	18	8	5	5	26	31	−5	21
5	Beyoğlu SK	18	5	5	8	25	39	−14	15
6	İstanbulspor	18	5	4	9	27	44	−17	14
7	Vefa SK	18	4	4	10	24	46	−22	12
8	Küçükçekmece SK	18	3	4	11	12	44	−32	10
9	Kasımpaşa SK	18	3	2	13	19	43	−24	8
10	Anadolu Hisarı İdman Yurdu SK	18	3	2	13	23	53	−30	8
