= 1941 Turkish National Division =

Turkish National Division
- Season: 1941
- Champions: Beşiktaş (1st title)
- Matches: 90
- Goals: 361 (4.01 per match)
- Top goalscorer: Hakkı Yeten (18)

The 1941 National Division was the fifth edition of the Turkish National Division. Beşiktaş won their first title.

== Participants ==
- Eskişehir Demirspor - Eskişehir Football League and 1940 Turkish Football Championship winners
- Beşiktaş - Istanbul Football League, 1st
- Fenerbahçe - Istanbul Football League, 2nd
- Galatasaray - Istanbul Football League, 3rd
- İstanbulspor - Istanbul Football League, 4th
- Gençlerbirliği - Ankara Football League, 1st
- Harp Okulu - Ankara Football League, 2nd
- Maskespor - Ankara Football League, 3rd
- Altay - İzmir Football League, 1st
- Altınordu - İzmir Football League, 2nd

== League standings ==
Pos	Team	Pld	W	D	L	GF	GA	GAv	Pts
1	Beşiktaş	18	14	4	0	51	21	2.429	50
2	Galatasaray	18	12	4	2	45	20	2.250	46
3	Fenerbahçe	18	13	2	3	51	24	2.125	46
4	Harp Okulu	18	6	4	8	33	34	0.971	34
5	Altay	18	7	1	10	28	37	0.757	33
6	İstanbulspor	18	5	3	10	34	50	0.680	31
7	Altınordu	18	5	3	10	32	56	0.571	31
8	Eskişehir Demirspor	18	4	4	10	29	39	0.744	30
9	Maskespor	18	2	8	8	32	44	0.727	30
10	Gençlerbirliği	18	5	1	12	26	36	0.722	29

Rules for classification: 3 points for a win, 2 points for a draw, and 1 points for a loss.

== Results ==
Home \ Away	ALT	ATO	BJK	ESK	FNB	GAL	GEN	HAR	İST	MAS
Altay		1–0	1–2	4–1	1–2	1–3	2–0	1–0	5–0	1–0
Altınordu	2–1		3–5	2–2	2–1	1–5	1–0	0–2	4–3	4–4
Beşiktaş	3–1	4–0		3–1	1–1	1–1	3–2	2–0	5–1	6–0
Eskişehir Demirspor	7–1	5–3	0–1		0–4	1–2	1–0	2–2	2–5	1–0
Fenerbahçe	4–2	5–2	1–3	3–1		1–0	4–2	4–1	5–0	3–0
Galatasaray	3–0	6–0	2–3	3–1	2–1		1–0	1–1	3–2	1–0
Gençlerbirliği	3–1	2–1	2–3	3–2	1–2	0–0		3–2	2–3	1–0
Harp Okulu	2–3	6–2	1–2	0–0	1–4	2–5	3–2		4–0	2–1
İstanbulspor	1–1	1–2	1–1	1–0	2–3	1–3	5–2	1–3		4–2
Maskespor	4–1	3–3	3–3	2–2	3–3	4–4	2–1	1–1	3–3	

Legend: Blue = home team win; Yellow = draw; Red = away team win.
