= 1941–42 Istanbul Football League =

Istanbul Football League
- Season: 1941–42
- Champions: Beşiktaş JK (6th title)

The 1941–42 İstanbul Football League season was the 34th season of the league. Beşiktaş JK won the league for the 6th time.

== Season ==
Pos	Team	Pld	W	D	L	GF	GA	GD	Pts
1	Beşiktaş JK	18	17	0	1	90	13	+77	51 (Note: 1 point deducted?)
2	Galatasaray SK	18	16	0	2	71	11	+60	50
3	Fenerbahçe SK	18	13	0	5	67	13	+54	44
4	İstanbulspor	18	11	1	6	35	30	+5	41
5	Vefa SK	18	8	3	7	39	36	+3	36 (Note: 1 point deducted?)
6	Kasımpaşa SK	18	6	3	9	32	45	−13	33
7	Beykoz 1908 S.K.D.	18	4	4	10	24	42	−18	30
8	Küçükçekmece SK	18	5	2	11	26	71	−45	30
9	Taksim SK	18	3	0	15	18	84	−66	23 (Note: 1 point deducted?)
10	Beyoğlu SK	18	0	1	17	13	70	−57	17 (Note: 2 points deducted?)
