= 1940–41 Istanbul Football League =

Istanbul Football League
- Season: 1940–41
- Champions: Beşiktaş JK (5th title)

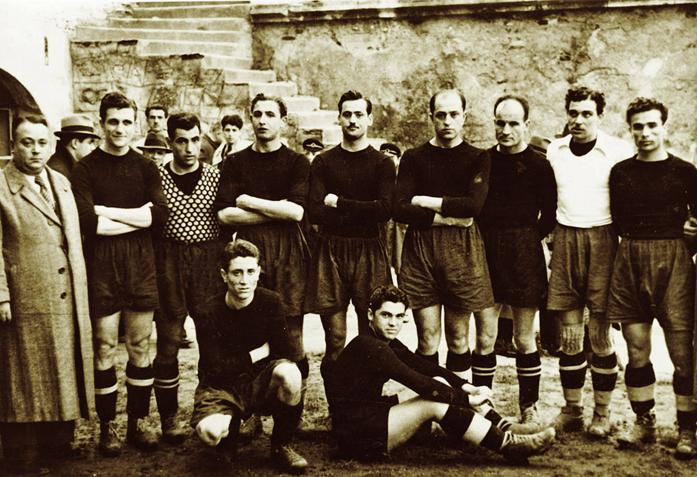
Champion Beşiktaş J.K. squad after the 1940–41 Istanbul Football League season.

The 1940–41 İstanbul Football League season was the 33rd season of the league. Beşiktaş JK won the league for the 5th time.

== Season ==
Pos	Team	Pld	W	D	L	GF	GA	GD	Pts
1	Beşiktaş JK	18	18	0	0	84	14	+70	54
2	Fenerbahçe SK	18	14	1	3	63	15	+48	47
3	Galatasaray SK	18	10	4	4	59	23	+36	42
4	İstanbulspor	18	8	4	6	43	47	−4	38
5	Beyoğlu SK	18	7	3	8	40	40	0	35
6	Vefa SK	18	6	4	8	39	43	−4	34
7	Beykoz 1908 S.K.D.	18	5	1	12	27	44	−17	29
8	Kasımpaşa SK	18	5	1	12	26	44	−18	29
9	Küçükçekmece SK	18	4	2	12	19	62	−43	28
10	Topkapı SK	18	1	4	13	18	86	−68	17 (Note: 7 points deducted?)
