= 1939–40 Istanbul Football League =

Istanbul Football League
- Season: 1939–1940
- Champions: Beşiktaş JK (4th title)

The 1939–40 İstanbul Football League season was the 32nd season of the league. Beşiktaş JK won the league for the 4th time.

== Season ==
Pos	Team	Pld	W	D	L	GF	GA	GD	Pts
1	Beşiktaş JK	18	15	1	2	76	20	+56	49
2	Fenerbahçe SK	18	14	2	2	77	13	+64	48
3	Galatasaray SK	18	13	2	3	78	11	+67	46
4	Vefa SK	18	11	3	4	48	26	+22	43
5	Beykoz 1908 S.K.D.	18	10	3	5	44	24	+20	41
6	İstanbulspor	18	7	1	10	36	45	−9	32 (Note: 1 point deducted)
7	Kasımpaşa SK	18	4	2	12	29	53	−24	28
8	Küçükçekmece SK	18	4	1	13	24	56	−32	27
9	Topkapı SK	18	4	0	14	20	84	−64	25 (Note: 1 point deducted)
10	Hilal SK	18	0	1	17	7	107	−100	17 (Note: 2 points deducted)
