= Istanbul Football Cup =

Football competition in Istanbul, Turkey

The Istanbul Football Cup (Turkish: İstanbul Futbol Kupası) was a football competition for Istanbul clubs in Turkey. The cup replaced the Istanbul Shield in 1942 and lasted until 1947. The final match between Beşiktaş and Fenerbahçe was cancelled in 1947.

== Past winners ==
Year	Winners (number of titles)	Runners-up
1942	Galatasaray (1)	Fenerbahçe
1943	Galatasaray (2)	Beşiktaş
1944	Beşiktaş (1)	Fenerbahçe
1945	Fenerbahçe (1)	Beşiktaş
1946	Beşiktaş (2)	Beykozspor
1947	Cancelled	
