= 1942–43 Istanbul Football League =

Football season in Turkey

Istanbul Football League
- Season: 1942–43
- Champions: Beşiktaş JK (7th title)

The 1942–43 İstanbul Football League season was the 35th season of the league. Beşiktaş JK won the league for the 7th time.

== Season ==
Pos	Team	Pld	W	D	L	GF	GA	GD	Pts
1	Beşiktaş JK	18	18	0	0	81	9	+72	36
2	Fenerbahçe SK	4	1	1	2	69	15	+54	31 (Note: 28 bonus points?)
3	Galatasaray SK	18	12	2	4	60	19	+41	26
4	Vefa SK	18	10	2	6	49	35	+14	22
5	İstanbulspor	18	8	3	7	37	43	−6	19
6	Beykoz 1908 S.K.D.	18	5	6	7	29	32	−3	16
7	Kasımpaşa SK	18	4	2	12	26	70	−44	10
8	Davutpaşa SK	18	3	2	13	22	62	−40	8
9	Küçükçekmece SK	18	2	4	12	26	68	−42	8
10	Taksim SK	24	2	6	16	22	68	−46	4 (Note: 6 points deducted?)
