= Ahmed Şerafettin =

Turkish football player and manager

Ahmet Şerafettin Bey
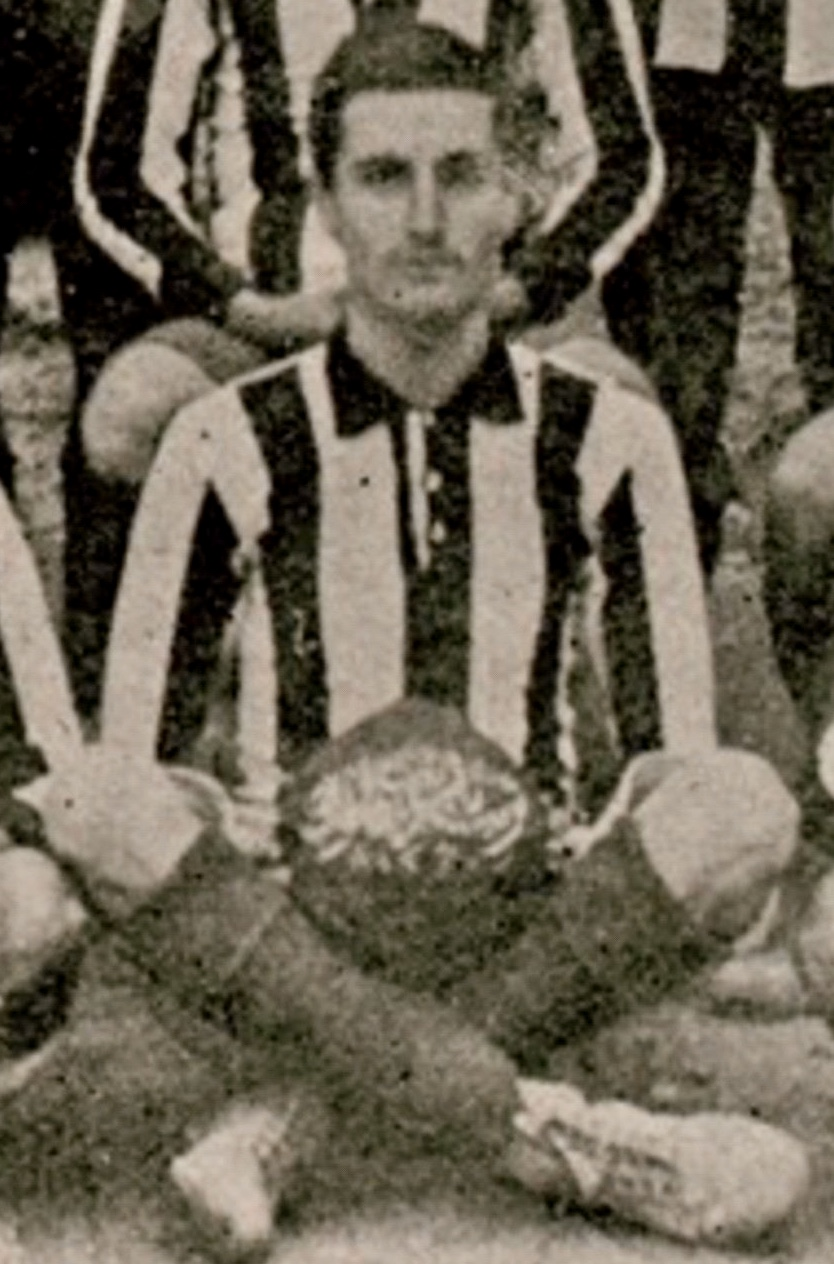

Personal information
- Date of birth: 1894
- Place of birth: Valide Çeşmesi, Beşiktaş, Ottoman Empire
- Date of death: 13 June 1933 (aged 38–39)
- Place of death: Istanbul, Turkey

Managerial career
- Years: Team
- 1911–1925: Beşiktaş J.K.

Ahmed Şerafettin (1894 – 13 June 1933), colloquially known as Şeref Bey, was a Turkish football player and manager.

Being one of the notable figures of Beşiktaş J.K., Şeref Bey was the first club captain and manager of the club, who coached the football department of club between 1911 and 1925, winning Istanbul Turkish Training Union League twice (1920 and 1921), Istanbul Sunday League (1921–22) and Istanbul Football League once (1923–24).

== Biography ==
Ahmed Şeraffettin was born in 1894, Valide Çeşme, Beşiktaş, Ottoman Empire. At age 7, he graduated Bediai Irfan Mektep. At age 10 he graduated Beşiktaş Mülkiye Rüştiyesi. Then at age 20, he graduated from a French school. Şeref Bey was very active with sports and was excellent at Fencing. He was also part of the Beşiktaş Gymnastics Club. In 1910, he became the president of 2 newly formed football clubs: Valideçeşme and Basiret. In 1911 these 2 clubs merged to form the football division of Beşiktaş JK. The club chose him to be the team's manager. Beşiktaş didn't enter any official leagues, until 1919, when they competed in the Istanbul Football League. In his first two seasons, he led them to two championships. After the Turkish Independence War and the Turkish Republic formed in 1923, he entered his team into the Istanbul Football League. In 1924 he led them to a championship. The team came in 3rd place the next year and Şeref Bey retired, but was still active with the club. He started a project to build the club a new stadium. The stadium opened in 1933, but Şeref Bey became very ill and died a few months later. In his honor, the club named the stadium Şeref Stadium. Beşiktaş played there, until 1947, when they moved to İsmet İnönü Stadium. Şeref Bey's stature was erected in March, 2008 in Beşiktaş.

== See also ==
- List of one-club men
