= Fuat Balkan =

Turkish fencer (1887–1970)

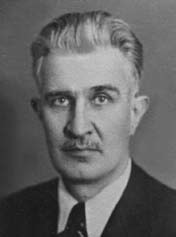

Personal information
- Born: 28 August 1887 Istanbul, Ottoman Empire
- Died: 28 May 1970 (aged 82)

Sport
- Sport: Fencing

Fuat Balkan (28 August 1887 – 28 May 1970) was a Turkish sabre fencer. He competed at the 1924 and 1928 Summer Olympics.
