= Beşiktaş J.K. =

Turkish professional football club

Beşiktaş
- Full name: Beşiktaş Jimnastik Kulübü
- Nicknames: Kara Kartallar (lit. 'Black Eagles'); Siyah Beyazlılar (lit. 'Black and Whites')
- Short name: BJK
- Founded: 3 March 1903; 123 years ago as Bereket Jimnastik Kulübü
- Stadium: Beşiktaş Stadium
- Capacity: 42,684
- Coordinates: 41°02′21″N 28°59′41″E
- President: Serdal Adalı
- Head coach: Vincenzo Italiano
- League: Süper Lig
- 2025–26: Süper Lig, 4th of 18
- Website: bjk.com.tr
Home colours	Away colours	Third colours

Beşiktaş Jimnastik Kulübü (Turkish pronunciation: [beˈʃictaʃ], lit. 'Beşiktaş Gymnastics Club'), abbreviated as BJK, is a Turkish professional sports club founded in 1903 that is based in the Beşiktaş district, Istanbul. The club's football team is one of the Big Three in Turkey and one of the most successful teams in the country, having never been relegated to a lower division. It was the first registered sports club in the country and one of the few that acquired the right to bear the Turkish flag on its crest.

Its football team has won 21 league titles including 16 Turkish Süper Lig, three Turkish National Division and two Turkish Football Championship titles, along with 11 Turkish Cup titles. Beşiktaş is also the only team to have won the Süper Lig undefeated, in the 1991–92 campaign. The team last won the Turkish Süper Lig title during the 2020–21 season and the Turkish Cup in the 2023–24 season. The club's home ground is Beşiktaş Stadium, a 42,684-capacity all-seater stadium located by Dolmabahçe Palace. The stadium has been considered one of the best in the world for location, design, comfort, technology, atmosphere, and transportation.

The team also participates in European competitions regularly. Beşiktaş reached the quarter-finals of the 1986–87 European Cup and displayed the best Turkish team performance in the Champions League group stage by earning 14 points and progressing undefeated in the 2017–18 campaign. Beşiktaş have also reached the UEFA Europa League (Note: Known as UEFA Cup until 2008–09 season.) quarter-finals twice, in the 2002–03 and 2016–17 seasons. Based on its UEFA coefficient, Beşiktaş is currently the 4th highest ranked Turkish team and is ranked third all-time after its rivals Galatasaray and Fenerbahçe.

The club's fan base, Çarşı, is well known globally. They were chosen as the best fan group in voting conducted by American sports viewers due to their 132-decibel noise record at a 2007 match against Liverpool. The group is involved with sociopolitical causes and is traditionally considered to be working-class and left-wing, supporting what is known as "the people's team". The highest ever football attendance in Turkish league history was recorded in a Beşiktaş–Galatasaray derby with 76,127 spectators.

The club also competes in other sports such as women's football, basketball (men's, women's and wheelchair), volleyball (men's and women's), handball, athletics, beach football, boxing, bridge, chess, gymnastics, athletics, parasports, rowing, table tennis, wrestling and esports.

== History ==
=== 1902–1911: establishment of the club ===
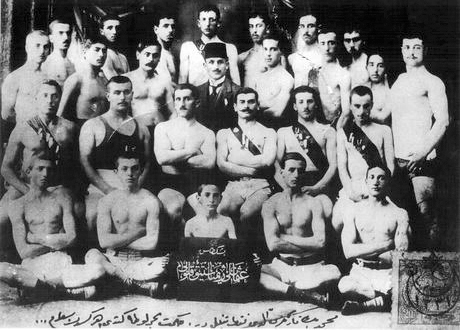
Members of Beşiktaş JK in 1910

According to the club's own archives, Beşiktaş traces its origins to March 1903, when local athletes in Serencebey formed a gymnastics society known as the Bereket Jimnastik Kulübü (Ottoman Turkish: برکت ژیمناستیق قلوبو). Activities initially focused on gymnastics, wrestling, boxing, fencing, and athletics.

Following the restoration of the constitutional monarchy in 1908 and the political turmoil surrounding the 31 March Incident (1909), prominent fencer Fuat Balkan and weightlifter/wrestler Mazhar Kazancı active in Edirne moved to Istanbul and joined the group, encouraging more organized training. Around this time the society adopted the name Beşiktaş Osmanlı Jimnastik Kulübü (Ottoman Turkish: بشكطاش عثمانلی ژیمناستیق قلوبو, lit. 'Beşiktaş Ottoman Gymnastics Club'), with founding member Mehmet Şamil Şhaplı elected as the first president.

On 13 January 1910, the club was formally registered with the authorities in the Ottoman Empire, becoming one of the earliest officially recognized sports clubs in the capital. Membership expanded quickly, and the headquarters moved from Ihlamur to Akaretler first to Building No. 49 and later to No. 84 where the yard behind the building was adapted for sport.

By 1911, youths from the Beşiktaş district who had formed the football sides “Valideçeşme” and “Basiret,” under the influence of Şeref Bey, were incorporated into the club. This step broadened the club beyond gymnastics to a multi-branch structure including football, rowing, and other disciplines.

Early club publications long repeated that the original colours were red and white, later changed to black and white in mourning for members lost during the Balkan Wars. Some later research and club-produced documentaries, however, doubt whether red-white was ever used in official competition, suggesting black-white predominated from an early stage. The issue remains debated in the literature.

=== 1911–1959: initial years of football ===
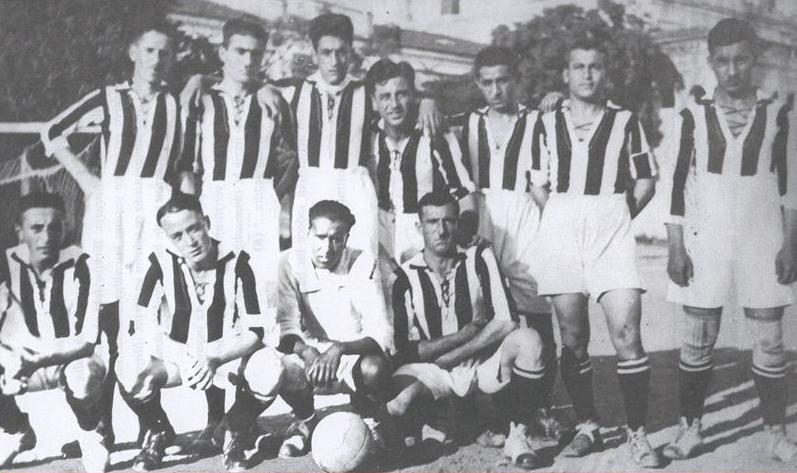
1923–24 Istanbul Football League champion squad.

With football rising in popularity in the Ottoman Empire by 1910, members of Beşiktaş increasingly shifted focus from gymnastics to the new code. In August 1911, Ahmed Şerafettin organized the club's first football side.

During World War I and the occupation of Istanbul, activity slowed as many athletes were mobilized; after the war Şeref Bey led the rebuilding of the squad. Beşiktaş did not participate in the Friday League or Sunday League, but in 1918 captured the Istanbul Turkish 1st Sports League title; the team repeated the success in 1921.

In 1924, Beşiktaş entered the Istanbul Football League and won the first championship of the 1923–24 season. Through the mid-1930s, Galatasaray and Fenerbahçe were the dominant Istanbul sides, but Beşiktaş collected a second Istanbul League crown in 1933–34. In 1934, Beşiktaş lifted its first national title, the Turkish Football Championship, defeating Altay 3–1 in the final on 29 October 1934.

The Turkish National League (’‘Milli Küme’’) began in 1937. After finishing fourth in the 1936–37 Istanbul League to qualify, Beşiktaş placed third in the 1937–38 Istanbul League and second in the 1938 ‘‘Milli Küme’’ behind Güneş.

Beşiktaş then set a record with five consecutive Istanbul League titles from 1939 to 1943. In ‘‘Milli Küme’’, the club finished 4th (1939), 5th (1940), 1st (1941), and 3rd (1943); the 1942 edition was not held due to wartime conditions. Domestically, Beşiktaş also won the Istanbul League in 1944–45 and 1945–46, and captured national ‘‘Milli Küme’’ titles in 1944 and 1947.

In May–June 1950, Beşiktaş undertook a month-long tour of the United States, playing seven fixtures against regional all-star selections and, in the New York finale, Manchester United. The team finished the trip with 5 wins, 1 draw and 1 defeat (GF 27, GA 10), with stops including New York, Boston, Chicago and Philadelphia; on returning to Turkey in mid-June the squad was received by President Celâl Bayar in Ankara.

1950 United States tour (Beşiktaş results)
Date	Opponent	Score†	Away	Source
21 May 1950	(United States) New York All-Stars	3–5	Beşiktaş	
25 May 1950	(United States) New England All-Stars	1–1	Beşiktaş	
28 May 1950	(United States) Chicago All-Stars	2–5	Beşiktaş	
1 June 1950	(United States) USA All-Stars	0–5	Beşiktaş	
6 June 1950	(United States) Philadelphia All-Stars	1–7	Beşiktaş	
9 June 1950	(United States) American League All-Stars	1–3	Beşiktaş	
11 June 1950	(England) Manchester United	2–1	Beşiktaş	
† Scores shown with Beşiktaş listed first. All matches were friendlies.

=== 1959–2001: from Milli Lig to Süper Lig ===
Professional football was formally adopted in Turkey on 24 September 1951, paving the way for a national league later in the decade. TFF launched the nationwide Millî Lig in 1959, played in two groups with a two-leg final; Fenerbahçe won the inaugural title, while Beşiktaş finished second in the White Group.

Beşiktaş claimed their first national league championship the very next season (1959–60), a campaign remembered for an eleven 1–0 wins record, and qualified for the 1960–61 European Cup, where they debuted versus Rapid Wien (0–4 a, 1–0 h; Rapid won 4–1 agg.).

The club added back-to-back league titles in 1965–66 and 1966–67, and lifted their first national super cup (then the Cumhurbaşkanlığı Kupası) in 1967 after beating Altay 1–0; the inaugural 1966 edition had been won by Galatasaray over Beşiktaş. The 1970s were leaner in the league—Beşiktaş's best finish was runners-up in 1973–74—but the club remained a constant in the top three and in European qualification.

A 14-season title drought ended in 1981–82 under coach Đorđe Milić. Another league crown followed in 1985–86 after a tight race with Galatasaray (level on points, superior goal difference/average to Beşiktaş). Internationally, Beşiktaş reached the 1986–87 European Cup quarter-finals, losing to Dynamo Kyiv (0–5 h in İzmir, 0–2 a).

=== 1987–1993: Gordon Milne era ===
English coach Gordon Milne took charge in 1987 and imposed a disciplined 4–4–2, quick flank play and aggressive pressing. He leaned on club stalwarts such as Rıza Çalımbay and built around a young forward line that would soon define the period. Metin Tekin, Ali Gültiken and Feyyaz Uçar formed the MAF trio—supporters’ shorthand for Beşiktaş's most celebrated strikeforce. Their movement and finishing underpinned the side's goals and its identity through the early 1990s.

Milne delivered three consecutive league titles: 1989–90, 1990–91, 1991–92. The last of these remains the Süper Lig’s only unbeaten championship: P30 W23 D7 L0. Beşiktaş set the league's biggest winning margin by beating Adana Demirspor 10–0 on 15 October 1989 at Ali Sami Yen; the goals were shared by Ali Gültiken (4), Metin Tekin (3) and Feyyaz Uçar (3) a snapshot of the MAF era at full tilt.

Regular European qualification returned. In the 1991–92 European Cup, Beşiktaş met PSV Eindhoven in the first round (0–1 agg.: 0–0 in Istanbul, 0–1 in Eindhoven).

=== 1993–2000: After Milne — transition, Daum's title and cup wins ===
With Gordon Milne gone in 1993, Beşiktaş stayed competitive while reshaping the squad around senior leaders (e.g. Rıza Çalımbay) and emerging names such as Sergen Yalçın and Ertuğrul Sağlam. Under Christoph Daum, Beşiktaş won the 1994–95 1.Lig, finishing three points clear and returning to the UEFA Champions League as champions.

Beşiktaş also lifted two major domestic cups in the mid-1990s. First came the 1993–94 Turkish Cup, won over Galatasaray (0–0 away; 3–2 at İnönü). Beşiktaş then beat Galatasaray 3–1 to win the 1994 Presidential Cup at Ankara 19 Mayıs Stadium, with goals from Feyyaz Uçar, Metin Tekin and Sergen Yalçın.

After Rasim Kara (1996–97), John Toshack took over (1997–99) and delivered Beşiktaş's 1997–98 Turkish Cup, defeating Galatasaray on penalties after two 1–1 legs, and then the 1998 Presidential Cup (2–1 a.e.t.). Toshack's tenure ended when Real Madrid paid compensation to appoint him in February 1999, underscoring the profile he had rebuilt in Istanbul.

On the European stage, Beşiktaş frequently qualified through the decade and returned to the UEFA Champions League group phase in 1997–98, finishing their campaign at that stage; UEFA records list the season under the club's group-stage appearances.

Brief spells followed under Karl-Heinz Feldkamp and Hans-Peter Briegel, leading into the Nevio Scala appointment for 2000–01 and the club's first multi-group Champions League era—setting the stage for Beşiktaş's modern period in the 2000s.

=== 2000–2015: Post-centenary transition and European runs ===
After appointing Mircea Lucescu, Beşiktaş won the Süper Lig in their centenary season (2002–03) with 85 points (26–7–1), eight clear of Galatasaray. The team conceded 21 league goals and finished the campaign unbeaten at İnönü (home: 14–3–0). Beşiktaş clinched the title on 31 May 2003 with a 4–3 away win at Samsunspor.

Derbies were decisive: Beşiktaş defeated Galatasaray 1–0 away on 8 December 2002 and 1–0 at İnönü on 25 May 2003; they also beat Fenerbahçe 1–0 in Kadıköy on 2 February 2003 and 2–0 at İnönü on 20 April 2003. In Europe, Beşiktaş eliminated Sarajevo (2–2, 5–0), Alavés (1–1, 1–0), Dynamo Kyiv (3–1 agg.) and Slavia Praha (4–3 agg.) to reach the UEFA Cup quarter-finals, where they lost to Lazio (0–1, 1–2). Goalkeeper Óscar Córdoba recorded 18 clean sheets in 31 league matches that season.

In June 2004 the club appointed Vicente del Bosque on a two-year deal; the tenure ended in January 2005, after which former captain Rıza Çalımbay took charge for the remainder of the season. Under Çalımbay, Beşiktaş stabilized results in the spring, climbed into the European places, and closed the campaign with a positive goal difference and one of the league's better defensive records. A defining match that spring was the 4–3 away derby win over Fenerbahçe at Kadıköy on 17 April 2005, when forward Daniel Pancu finished the game in goal after Óscar Córdoba was sent off; Pancu's saves preserved the result, and the match entered club lore as “Kaleci Pancu”.

In the Turkish Cup, the team advanced to the later rounds before elimination by top-flight opposition; in Europe, Beşiktaş featured in the UEFA Cup playing the autumn group stage but failing to progress to the knockouts.

A rebuild followed under Jean Tigana (October 2005–May 2007). Across two seasons Beşiktaş placed third and then second in the Süper Lig, won consecutive Türkiye Kupası finals in 2005–06 (3–2 a.e.t. v Fenerbahçe) and 2006–07 (1–0 a.e.t. v Kayseri Erciyesspor), and lifted the inaugural Turkish Super Cup in 2006 (1–0 v Galatasaray). In Europe, the team reached the UEFA Cup group stage in both seasons before elimination at that round. Tigana departed in May 2007 and the club moved on to Ertuğrul Sağlam.

Ertuğrul Sağlam was appointed in July 2007 and took Beşiktaş through two qualifying rounds into the Champions League group stage. They beat Sheriff Tiraspol 4–0 on aggregate (1–0 in Istanbul on 1 August; 3–0 away on 8 August), and then overcame FC Zürich 3–1 on aggregate (1–1 at Letzigrund on 15 August; 2–0 at İnönü on 29 August).

Drawn with Porto, Marseille and Liverpool in Group A, Beşiktaş beat Liverpool 2–1 in Istanbul on 24 October 2007, but lost 8–0 at Anfield on 6 November, a competition record margin at the time, and finished fourth in the section with one win from six. Domestically the team placed third in the 2007–08 Süper Lig with 73 points, as recorded by the Turkish Football Federation. Sağlam left early the following season and was succeeded by Mustafa Denizli.

In the 2008–09 season, veteran coach Mustafa Denizli the only manager to have won the Süper Lig with all three Istanbul giants led Beşiktaş to a domestic double. On 13 May 2009 the club beat Fenerbahçe 4–2 in the Turkish Cup final at İzmir Atatürk Stadium and, four days later, secured the league title with a 2–1 win away to Denizlispor.

In 2009–10, Beşiktaş opened with the 2009 Turkish Super Cup and lost 2–0 to Fenerbahçe at the Atatürk Olympic Stadium on 2 August 2009. As domestic double holders they entered the 2009–10 UEFA Champions League group stage in Group B with Manchester United, CSKA Moscow and Wolfsburg. Beşiktaş finished fourth with four points but recorded a landmark 1–0 win away to Manchester United at Old Trafford on 25 November 2009.

In the league they finished fourth and took a UEFA Europa League place for the following season; forward Bobô led the team with 12 league goals. As defending cup champions they entered the 2009–10 Turkish Cup directly in the group phase but were eliminated after finishing fourth in Group D.

In 2010–11, Beşiktaş assembled a high-profile squad with summer arrivals Guti and Ricardo Quaresma, followed in January by Simão and Hugo Almeida and Manuel Fernandes on loan. Head coach Bernd Schuster resigned in March 2011 and Tayfur Havutçu took over for the run-in.

In Europe, Beşiktaş advanced from the UEFA Europa League group stage behind eventual champions Porto, but were eliminated by Dynamo Kyiv in the round of 32. Domestically the club finished fifth in the Süper Lig and secured European qualification by winning the 2011 Turkish Cup, defeating İstanbul BB on penalties after a 2–2 draw (a.e.t.) at Kadir Has Stadium in Kayseri on 11 May 2011. UEFA later sanctioned Beşiktaş in connection with match-fixing allegations related to that final; the club received a one-season ban from European competition in 2013, a decision upheld by the CAS in August 2013.

In 2012–13, Beşiktaş appointed Samet Aybaba amid financial restructuring and a younger squad profile. The team finished third in the Süper Lig and secured European qualification via league position, while exiting the Turkish Cup in the earlier rounds. In summer 2013, however, UEFA imposed a one-season suspension that barred the club from taking up its European berth; the CAS upheld the decision in August 2013.

For 2013–14, the club appointed Slaven Bilić and began the redevelopment of İnönü, playing most home matches at the Atatürk Olympic Stadium. Beşiktaş again placed third in the league; because of the UEFA sanction, the club did not compete in Europe that season.

In 2014–15, Bilić led Beşiktaş to a title race (third in the final table) and a strong UEFA Europa League campaign. Beşiktaş won Group C ahead of Tottenham Hotspur, Asteras Tripolis and Partizan, then eliminated Liverpool in the round of 32 after a 1–1 aggregate (5–4 pens.) before going out to Club Brugge in the round of 16 (1–2 away, 1–3 home).

=== 2015–present: Return to Dolmabahçe, titles under Şenol Güneş, and aftermath ===
Beşiktaş appointed Şenol Güneş in June 2015 on a two–year contract with an option to extend. During 2015–16, the club returned to Dolmabahçe and opened the rebuilt Vodafone Park on 11 April 2016 with a 3–2 league win over Bursaspor; Mario Gómez scored the first official goal at the new ground. Beşiktaş secured the league title a month later by defeating Osmanlıspor 3–1 on 15 May 2016; Gómez finished as top scorer with 26 league goals. In Europe, Beşiktaş competed in the 2015–16 UEFA Europa League group stage (Group H) with Sporting CP, Lokomotiv Moskva and Skënderbeu, finishing third.

Beşiktaş retained the championship in 2016–17, clinching the title with a 4–0 away win at Gaziantepspor on 28 May 2017. In Europe, the club played the 2016–17 UEFA Champions League (Group B with Benfica, Napoli and Dynamo Kyiv), finished third, and transferred to the UEFA Europa League where they defeated Hapoel Beer-Sheva (5–2 agg.) and Olympiacos (5–2 agg.) before going out to Lyon on penalties after a 2–2 aggregate in the quarter-finals.

In 2017–18 Beşiktaş topped a Champions League group for the first time in Turkish football history, finishing unbeaten on 14 points in Group G against Porto, Monaco and RB Leipzig. They were eliminated in the round of 16 by Bayern Munich (8–1 agg.; 0–5 in Munich, 1–3 in Istanbul). The domestic season was marked by the abandoned Intercontinental Derby semi-final in the Turkish Cup on 19 April 2018, when an object struck Güneş at Şükrü Saracoğlu Stadium. The TFF ordered the match to resume behind closed doors; Beşiktaş declined to appear, whereupon the TFF awarded the tie to Fenerbahçe and banned Beşiktaş from the 2018–19 Turkish Cup and Super Cup.

In 2018–19 Beşiktaş competed in the UEFA Europa League group stage (Group I with Genk, Malmö and Sarpsborg), failing to advance, and finished third in the league. In March 2019 the TFF announced that Güneş would assume the Turkey job in June; he remained in post at Beşiktaş until the end of the season.

In 2019–20, Beşiktaş began under Abdullah Avcı and played the UEFA Europa League group stage (Group K with Braga, Wolverhampton Wanderers and Slovan Bratislava), finishing fourth. Avcı departed in January 2020; former player Sergen Yalçın was appointed and led an upturn after the COVID-19 suspension, with matches completed behind closed doors. The club finished third in the league; because Trabzonspor received a one-season UEFA ban for FFP breaches (upheld by CAS in July 2020), Beşiktaş took the Champions League second-qualifying slot for 2020–21.

In 2020–21, Yalçın's side won the league and cup double. In Europe they were eliminated in the Champions League second qualifying round by PAOK (1–3, one-leg tie in Thessaloniki) and then on penalties by Rio Ave in the UEFA Europa League third qualifying round. Domestically Beşiktaş captured the Süper Lig title on the final day with a 2–1 win at Göztepe to edge Galatasaray on goal difference, then won the Turkish Cup three days later by defeating Antalyaspor 2–0 in İzmir.

In 2021–22, as champions Beşiktaş returned to the UEFA Champions League group stage (Group C with Ajax, Borussia Dortmund and Sporting CP), finishing fourth after six defeats. Sergen Yalçın resigned in December 2021; academy coach Önder Karaveli served as caretaker before Valérien Ismaël was appointed in March 2022 for the run-in. Beşiktaş finished sixth in the league and won the 2021 Turkish Super Cup (played 5 January 2022 in Doha), defeating Antalyaspor on penalties after a 1–1 draw.

In 2022–23, Beşiktaş did not compete in Europe and focused on domestic competitions. After parting with Valérien Ismaël in late October, the club reappointed Şenol Güneş as head coach. In January, Wout Weghorst's loan ended early for a move to Manchester United and Vincent Aboubakar returned. Beşiktaş then put together a long unbeaten run in spring, including a 4–2 away win at Fenerbahçe on 2 April 2023 and a 3–1 home victory over Galatasaray on 30 April 2023. Following the February earthquakes, Hatayspor and Gaziantep FK withdrew from the league; remaining fixtures against those clubs were awarded as 3–0 wins and previous results stood, per TFF rulings. Beşiktaş finished third in the league and exited the Turkish Cup in the quarter-finals.

Beşiktaş began 2023–24 season with Şenol Güneş, but a run of poor results capped by a 3–2 home collapse to Lugano in the Europa Conference League—led to his resignation on 6 October 2023; assistant Burak Yılmaz acted briefly before Rıza Çalımbay was appointed on 10 November. Amid the downturn, the club held a presidential election on 3 December 2023, in which Hasan Arat defeated incumbent Ahmet Nur Çebi and took office at an extraordinary congress. Seeking stability, Beşiktaş appointed Fernando Santos in January 2024, but dismissed him on 13 April 2024 after continued underperformance; academy coach Serdar Topraktepe took interim charge and won the 2023–24 Turkish Cup with a 3–2 victory over Trabzonspor at Atatürk Olympic Stadium on 23 May 2024.

Beşiktaş began the 2024–25 season by appointing Dutch coach Giovanni van Bronckhorst in June, and got off to a historic start by winning the 2024 Turkish Super Cup in emphatic fashion. On 3 August 2024, they defeated arch-rivals Galatasaray 5–0 at the Atatürk Olympic Stadium in Istanbul—marking the largest winning margin in Turkish Super Cup history.

Form dipped in autumn; UEFA moved the home Europa League tie against Maccabi Tel-Aviv to Debrecen behind closed doors for security reasons and Beşiktaş lost 3–1 there, and the club parted ways with Van Bronckhorst at the end of November. Ole Gunnar Solskjær was appointed head coach in January and marked his first European match with a 4–1 win over Athletic Club, while his side also recorded derby victories over both Fenerbahçe and Galatasaray later in the league campaign; Beşiktaş nevertheless finished fourth in the Süper Lig.

Following the conclusion of the 2024–25 Süper Lig campaign, Beşiktaş experienced further managerial changes where Solskjær parted ways with the club early in the 2025–26 season following a UEFA Conference League play-off exit against FC Lausanne-Sport leading former player and manager Sergen Yalçın to return to take charge in August. The team recorded 20 wins across 39 official matches under his management during the season. Beşiktaş concluded the Süper Lig campaign in fourth place and exited the Turkish Cup at the semi-final stage by a 1–0 loss against Konyaspor. Additionally, the team did not secure a win in any of their matches against Galatasaray, Fenerbahçe, or Trabzonspor during the season. In May 2026, Yalçın's contract was terminated under mutual consent following a meeting with the club management.

On 5 June 2026, the club appointed Vincenzo Italiano as their new head coach. Italiano's side successfully navigated the early stages of the UEFA Europa League qualifiers in July 2026 by overcoming FC Midtjylland 3–0 on aggregate in the second qualifying round. He has been successful as of recently, becoming the first coach in years to win the 5 first home game in the turkish league.

== Colours and crest ==
The crest of Beşiktaş is a black-and-white shield with the initials BJK, the founding year 1903, and the crescent-and-star from the Turkish flag rendered in red. The shield form and elements have been used—through minor redraws—across kits, branding, and the club museum since the mid-20th century. Per TFF kit regulations, the club displays three stars above the crest (one star per five national championships), in line with federation rules on championship stars and insignia.

Beşiktaş's registered colours are black and white, which define the home identity and are consistently used across visual materials and kits. Traditional home strips pair white shirts with black shorts (socks in black or white), with away/third kits rotating around the same palette and occasional accent colours while retaining the crest's red crescent-and-star.

The legal name Beşiktaş Jimnastik Kulübü (BJK) reflects the club's origins as a multi-sport institution established in 1903; the football branch was organized under Şeref Bey and his Valideçeşme side in 1911. The nickname “Kara Kartallar” (Black Eagles)—now embedded in club communications and the museum—arose from supporter usage that took hold by the mid-20th century and was later adopted officially.

=== Kit manufacturers and shirt sponsors ===
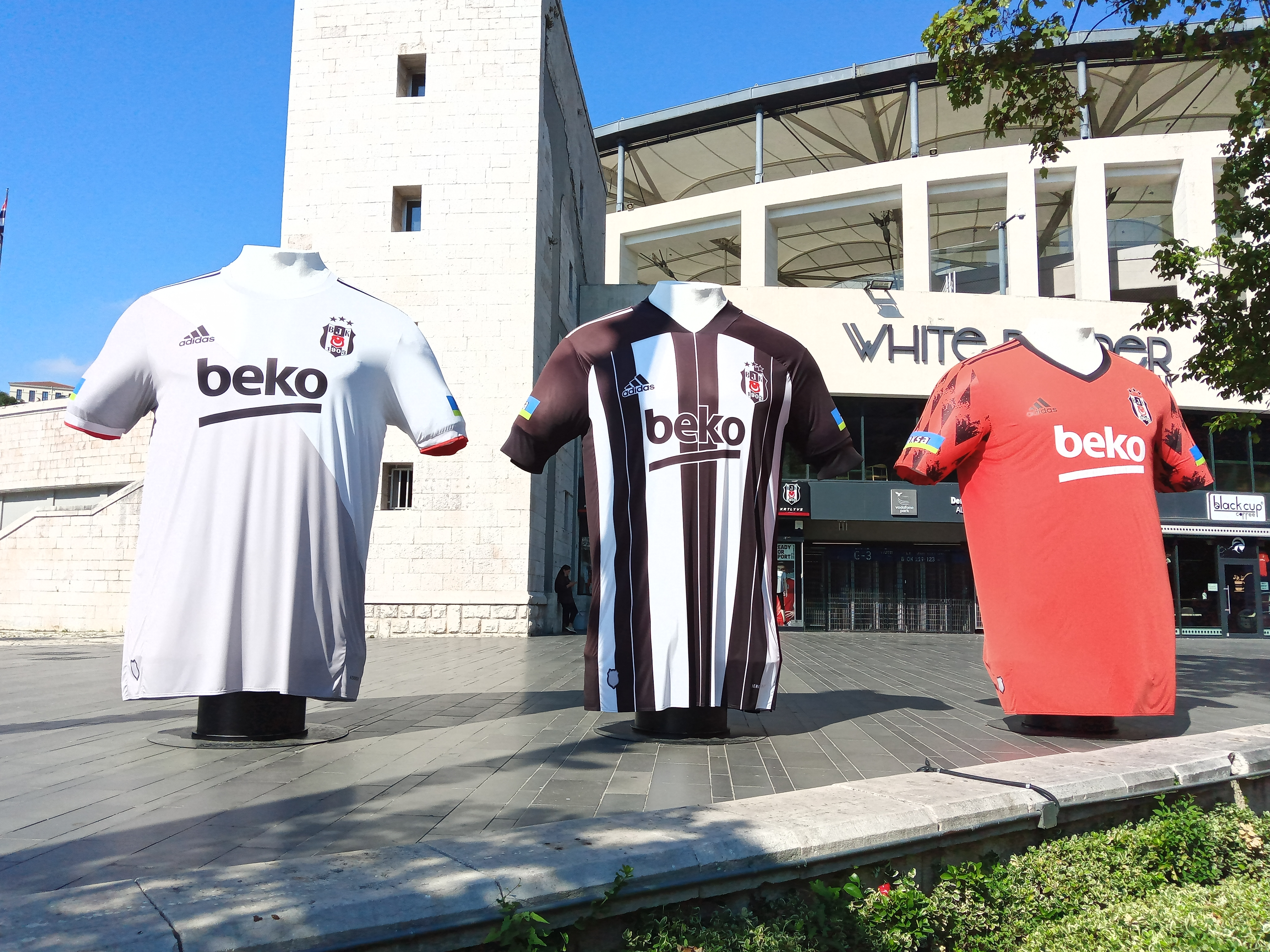
2020–21 season team kits with main sponsporship of Beko, exhibited in front of Beşiktaş Stadium

As of 29 June 2026

Season	Kit Supplier	Shirt
1977–80	—	—
1980–81	—	KİP
1981–82	—	Bako
1982–83	Umbro	Anka
1983–84	Umbro	Doysan, Bağbank
1984–85	Umbro	Sony
1985–86	Sport	Sony
1986–87	Adidas	Beslen Makarna
1987–88	Adidas	Toshiba, Titibank
1988–89	Adidas	Titibank, Bozkurt Mensucat
1989–90	Adidas	Demirdöküm, Aygaz Fırın
1990–1998	Adidas	Beko
1998–2001	Reebok	Beko
2001–2004	Puma	Beko
2004–2005	Puma	Turkcell
2005–2009	Umbro	Cola Turka
2009–2011	Adidas	Cola Turka
2011–2014	Adidas	Toyota
2014–2020	Adidas	Vodafone
2020–2022	Adidas	Beko
2022–2024	Adidas	Rain
2024–2026	Adidas	Beko
2026–present	Nike	Beko

== Supporters ==
Beşiktaş's core supporters’ group is Çarşı, formed in the early 1980s around the Beşiktaş marketplace and known for the slogan “Çarşı her şeye karşı” (“Çarşı is against everything”). The group's identity mixes humour with social and civic activism and has been profiled widely in international media. Following the 2013 Gezi Park protests, prosecutors brought a high-profile case against 35 Çarşı members; an Istanbul court acquitted them in December 2015 (after charges that included “attempting to overthrow the government”), and later proceedings again ended in acquittal.

Beşiktaş are noted for intense home atmospheres first at İnönü and, since 2016, at Beşiktaş Stadium on the Dolmabahçe shoreline. UEFA match coverage has repeatedly highlighted the noise levels and elaborate choreographies at European ties held there.

Supporters have been central to club-led relief efforts in times of crisis. After the 10 December 2016 bombings outside the stadium, Beşiktaş fans mobilised for blood donations and commemorations around the ground and in the district. In February 2023, following the earthquakes in southern Türkiye, Beşiktaş supporters threw thousands of plush toys onto the pitch during a home match to donate to children affected by the disaster—an action reported worldwide.

While the club is rooted in the Beşiktaş district of Istanbul, away followings are strong across Turkey and in the Turkish diaspora in Germany, the Netherlands and Austria, reflected in sizeable turnouts at European away fixtures.

== Rivalries ==
=== Beşiktaş–Fenerbahçe rivalry ===
The Beşiktaş and Fenerbahçe rivalry is one of the most volatile and historically rich matchups in Turkish football. With both clubs commanding massive national fanbases, their clashes—often labeled as “the most unpredictable of the Istanbul derbies”—have played a central role in defining seasons, titles, and national debates. The two clubs first met in 1924, with early contests reflecting the growing divide between Beşiktaş's central Istanbul working-class identity and Fenerbahçe's traditionally bourgeois Kadıköy base. Over the decades, this geographical and social split hardened into a fierce rivalry, intensified by league titles, cup competitions, and controversial moments.

One of the most iconic chapters came in November 2005, when Beşiktaş stunned Fenerbahçe with a 4–3 comeback win at Şükrü Saracoğlu Stadium. Goals from Tümer Metin, Carew, İbrahim Akın and Koray Avcı turned the game into a symbol of Beşiktaş's fighting spirit. The 2013–14 fixture, ending 3–2 in Beşiktaş's favor, saw Olcay Şahan score a last-minute winner amid deafening tension.

The rivalry reached boiling point in April 2018, during the Turkish Cup semi-final second leg. With the tie finely poised, Fenerbahçe fans pelted objects onto the pitch, one of which struck Beşiktaş coach Şenol Güneş on the head, forcing him to leave the stadium bleeding. The match was abandoned, and the Turkish Football Federation later canceled the replay, sparking weeks of protests from Beşiktaş and legal disputes.

Player transfers between the clubs have added to the enmity. The move of Tümer Metin from Beşiktaş to Fenerbahçe in 2006 was seen as a betrayal by many Beşiktaş fans. In contrast, Gökhan Gönül and Caner Erkin, both former Fenerbahçe players, joined Beşiktaş and became key figures in their 2016–17 title run, shifting narrative dynamics. In the 2024–25 season, Beşiktaş beat Fenerbahçe 1–0 in a heated league encounter under manager Ole Gunnar Solskjær, regaining bragging rights during a turbulent campaign. Despite occasional moments of sportsmanship, the rivalry remains charged, with every meeting watched by millions, often under the shadow of heightened police presence due to fan unrest and ultras’ provocations.

=== Beşiktaş–Galatasaray rivalry ===
The Beşiktaş vs Galatasaray rivalry represents a battle of central Istanbul—two of Turkey's most decorated football institutions separated by a few kilometers but divided by culture, tradition, and silverware.

While the Galatasaray–Fenerbahçe “Intercontinental Derby” may draw global attention, Beşiktaş–Galatasaray derbies tend to be grittier, with an edge defined by inner-city dominance, supporter clashes, and critical title races. Both clubs were formed in the early 20th century, and their first official meeting occurred in 1924. One of the most famous encounters was in 2003, during Beşiktaş's centenary season, when the Black Eagles secured the title with a last-minute 1–0 win over Galatasaray at İnönü Stadium thanks to a goal from Sergen Yalçın.

In May 2016, Beşiktaş beat Galatasaray 1–0 at the Türk Telekom Arena and then clinched the title a week later with a 3–1 home win over Osmanlıspor under Şenol Güneş. The rivalry also runs through the cups. In the 1998–99 Turkish Cup final, Galatasaray defeated Beşiktaş 2–0 on aggregate (0–0, 0–2). More recently, on 3 August 2024, Beşiktaş thrashed Galatasaray 5–0 to win the Turkish Super Cup, the competition's biggest winning margin.

Derby weeks regularly bring heightened tension between Çarşı and UltrAslan, and these fixtures are among the league's most watched every season.

=== Beşiktaş–Trabzonspor rivalry ===
The rivalry with Trabzonspor emerged in the late 1970s when Trabzonspor broke the Istanbul clubs’ monopoly with six league titles in nine seasons. The hostility has been stoked by regional pride and repeated clashes in Turkish Cup finals. In the 2023–24 final, Beşiktaş beat Trabzonspor 3–2 at the Atatürk Olympic Stadium, lifting their 11th Turkish Cup under interim manager Serdar Topraktepe.

=== Lesser-known rivalries ===
Though less intense, Beşiktaş also maintains rivalries with clubs like Bursaspor, due to fan conflicts and regional political tension, especially following their 2016 stadium opener where Beşiktaş won 3–2.

== Grounds ==
=== Early Stadiums and the Road to İnönü ===
From 1924, Beşiktaş played most senior fixtures at Taksim Stadium, then Istanbul's principal football ground. Taksim also hosted the Turkey national team's first match (26 Oct 1923, 2–2 v Romania), underlining the venue's central role in the game's early republican era. The former artillery barracks complex was cleared in the late-1930s/1940 as part of the Henri Prost plan for the new Taksim Square and park.

In the early 1930s Beşiktaş built and used Şeref Stadium in the gardens of Çırağan Palace, named for club pioneer Şeref Bey. Contemporary accounts record Beşiktaş using Şeref as the club ground through the 1930s and into the late 1940s, overlapping with Taksim as Istanbul's shared venue.

The Dolmabahçe Stadium (later Mithatpaşa, then İnönü) was inaugurated on 19 May 1947 by President İsmet İnönü and Governor Lütfi Kırdar. The first match there was Beşiktaş–AIK Stockholm on 23 Nov 1947; Süleyman Seba scored the ground's first goal. Beşiktaş played at İnönü for 66 years until 11 May 2013, when they beat Gençlerbirliği 3–0 in the stadium's farewell league fixture before demolition.

While the new stadium was built, Beşiktaş staged home matches across Istanbul (and occasionally Ankara). In 2013–14, after the Kasımpaşa rental ended, the club confirmed it would complete the season at the Atatürk Olympic Stadium; later fixtures in 2015–16 were also scheduled or moved to Başakşehir Fatih Terim Stadium.

=== Beşiktaş Stadium: 2016–present ===
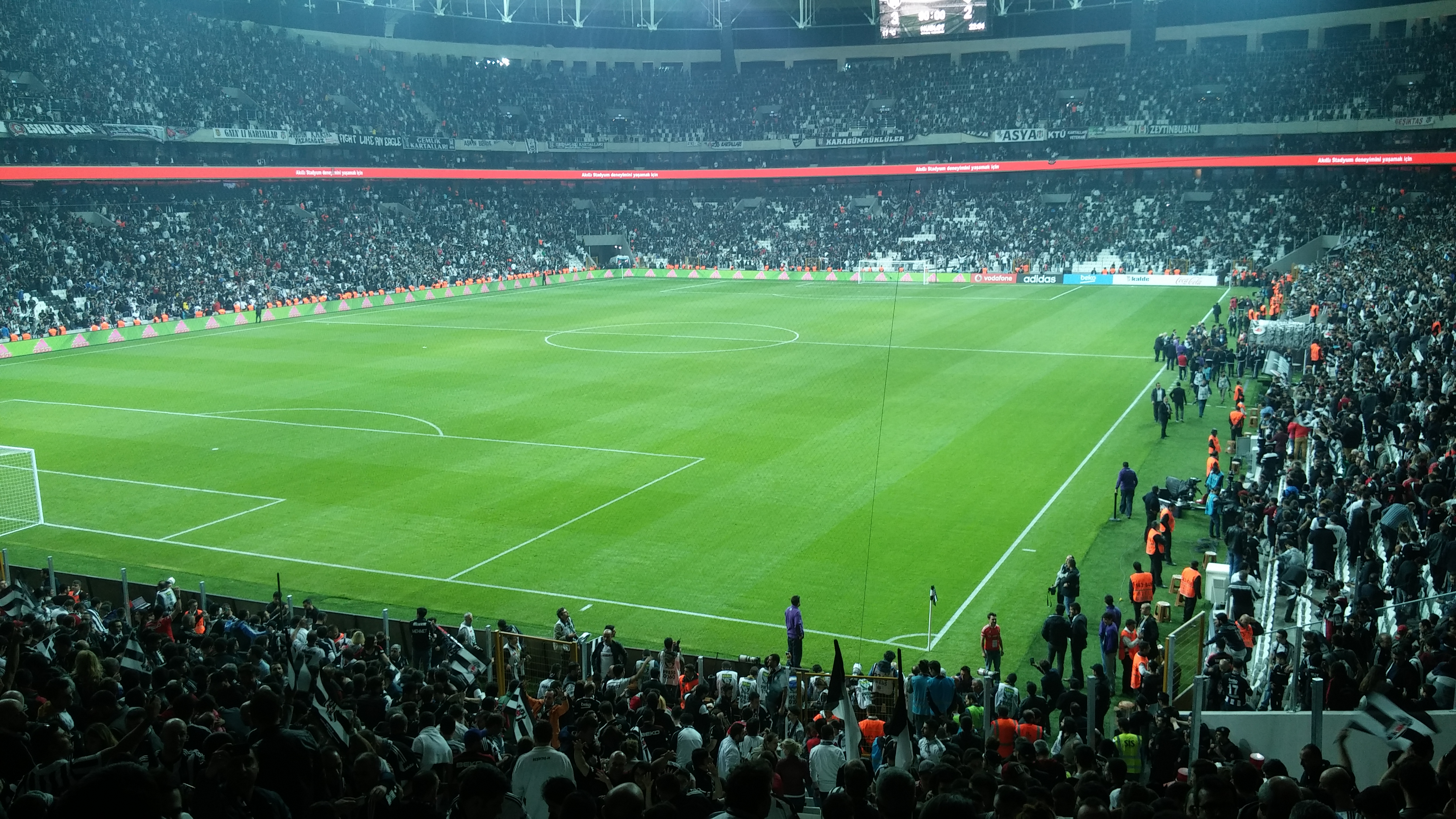
Opened in 2016, Beşiktaş Stadium is the home stadium of the club.

The new Beşiktaş Stadium on the Dolmabahçe site opened on 11 April 2016 with a 3–2 Süper Lig win over Bursaspor; Mario Gómez scored the first competitive goal at the ground. The all-seater venue has a capacity of 42,684 and 105×68 m pitch dimensions per federation records. As a multi-use, tech-enabled venue, it also hosts concerts and non-football events. Beşiktaş Stadium hosted the 2019 UEFA Super Cup (Liverpool–Chelsea), the first major UEFA men's final refereed by a woman (Stéphanie Frappart), with Liverpool winning on penalties. UEFA later awarded the 2026 UEFA Europa League final to Beşiktaş Stadium, scheduled for 20 May 2026.

In October 2023, Beşiktaş signed a three-year naming-rights deal with Tüpraş; the ground is currently styled Tüpraş Stadyumu for sponsorship purposes. The complex also houses the Beşiktaş JK Museum, re-opened in February 2017 inside the new stadium as Turkey's first officially-registered sports museum. The area around the stadium was also the site of the 10 December 2016 twin bomb attacks; a memorial park overlooking the ground commemorates the victims, with the official death toll at 44 according to Turkish authorities.

== Honours ==
As of 3 August 2024

Type	Competition	Titles	Seasons
Domestic	Super Lig	16	1956–57, 1957–58, 1959–60, 1965–66, 1966–67, 1981–82, 1985–86, 1989–90, 1990–91, 1991–92, 1994–95, 2002–03, 2008–09, 2015–16, 2016–17, 2020–21
Domestic	Turkish Cup	11	1974–75, 1988–89, 1989–90, 1993–94, 1997–98, 2005–06, 2006–07, 2008–09, 2010–11, 2020–21, 2023–24
Domestic	Turkish Super Cup	10	1967, 1974, 1986, 1989, 1992, 1994, 1998, 2006, 2021, 2024
Domestic	Prime Minister's Cup	6	1944, 1947, 1974, 1977, 1988, 1997
Domestic	Turkish National Division	3	1941, 1944, 1947
Domestic	Turkish Football Championship	2	1934, 1951
Domestic	Atatürk Cup	1^{S}	2000
Domestic	Spor Toto Cup	3	1966, 1969, 1970
Regional	Istanbul Football League	13	1923–24, 1933–34, 1938–39, 1939–40, 1940–41, 1941–42, 1942–43, 1944–45, 1945–46, 1949–50, 1950–51, 1951–52, 1953–54
Regional	Istanbul Football Cup	2^{S}	1944, 1946

- record
- ^{S} Shared record

=== Others ===
- TSYD Cup
  - Winners (12) (shared-record): 1964–65, 1965–66, 1971–72, 1972–73, 1974–75, 1983–84, 1984–85, 1988–89, 1989–90, 1990–91, 1993–94, 1996–97
- Turkish Amateur Football Championship
  - Winners (2): 1985, 1988
- Istanbul Shield
  - Winners (1): 1934–35
- WOW Cup
  - Winners (1): 2003
- Alpen Cup
  - Winners (1): 2004
- Efes Cup
  - Winners (1): 2006
- Soma Cup
  - Winners (1): 2014
- USA Cup / Intercontinental Cup / Semi-World Cup
  - Winners (1): 1950
- Brazil Cup / Intercontinental Cup
  - Winners (1): 1952
- International Royal Cup / Intercontinental Cup
  - Winners (1): 2015

== European record ==
=== Statistics ===
Accurate as of 22 October 2026

Competition	Pld	W	D	L	GF	GA	GD	Win%
European Cup / Champions League	89	27	19	43	89	153	−64	30.34
UEFA Cup Winners' Cup	20	4	4	12	21	38	−17	20.00
UEFA Cup / UEFA Europa League	142	64	26	52	226	186	+40	45.07
UEFA Conference League	16	9	2	5	29	24	+5	56.25
Total	267	104	51	112	365	401	−36	38.95

=== UEFA club points ranking ===
As of 22 May 2025

Rank	Team	Points
112	(Ukraine) Zorya Luhansk	16.000
113	(Turkey) Beşiktaş	15.000
114	(France) Lens	12.500

== Recent seasons ==
Season	League										Domestic		Continental			Top goalscorer(s) (Note: Goals across all competitions.)	
Season	Division	Pos	Pld	W	D	L	GF	GA	GD	Pts	TC	SC	UCL	UEL	UECL	Players	Goals
2016–17	Süper Lig	1st	34	23	8	3	73	30	43	77	R16	RU	GS	QF	N/A	Cenk Tosun	24
2017–18	Süper Lig	4th	34	21	8	5	69	30	39	71	SF	RU	R16	N/A	N/A	Talisca	19
2018–19	Süper Lig	3rd	34	19	8	7	72	46	26	65	DQ	N/A	N/A	GS	N/A	Burak Yılmaz	11
2019–20	Süper Lig	3rd	34	19	5	10	59	40	19	62	R32	N/A	N/A	GS	N/A	Burak Yılmaz	14
2020–21	Süper Lig	1st	40	26	6	8	89	44	45	84	W	N/A	2QR	3QR	N/A	Cyle Larin	23
2021–22	Süper Lig	6th	38	15	14	9	56	48	8	59	QF	W	GS	—	N/A	Michy Batshuayi	14
2022–23	Süper Lig	3rd	36	23	9	4	78	36	42	78	R16	N/A	N/A			Cenk Tosun	18
2023–24	Süper Lig	6th	38	16	8	14	52	47	5	56	W	N/A	N/A		GS	Vincent Aboubakar	12
2024–25	Süper Lig	4th	36	17	11	8	59	36	23	62	QF	W	N/A	LPH	N/A	Ciro Immobile	19
2025–26	Süper Lig	4th	34	17	9	8	59	40	19	60	SF	N/A	N/A	2QR	PO	Tammy Abraham	13

== Players ==
=== Current squad ===
As of 4 September 2026

Note: Flags indicate national team as defined under FIFA eligibility rules; some limited exceptions apply. Players may hold more than one non-FIFA nationality.

No.	Pos.	Nation	Player
1	GK	GER	Alexander Nübel
4	MF	NGR	Wilfred Ndidi (vice-captain)
6	MF	TUR	Salih Özcan
7	FW	KOS	Milot Rashica
8	MF	TUR	Kartal Yılmaz
9	FW	KOR	Oh Hyeon-gyu
10	MF	TUR	Orkun Kökçü (captain)
11	DF	CIV	Kassoum Ouattara
12	DF	CIV	Emmanuel Agbadou
15	MF	BEN	Junior Olaitan
17	FW	NED	Ernest Poku (on loan from Bayer Leverkusen)
18	MF	CZE	Václav Černý
19	MF	BEL	Leandro Trossard
21	MF	ITA	Fabio Miretti (on loan from Juventus)
22	DF	GER	Taylan Bulut
23	FW	TUR	Mustafa Hekimoğlu

No.	Pos.	Nation	Player
28	FW	SRB	Dušan Vlahović
29	FW	TUR	İlhan Fakılı
33	DF	TUR	Rıdvan Yılmaz (3rd captain)
35	DF	POR	Tiago Djaló
50	DF	ROU	Ümit Akdağ
53	DF	TUR	Emirhan Topçu
58	DF	TUR	Yasin Özcan (on loan from Aston Villa)
62	DF	PAN	Amir Murillo
63	DF	TUR	Azem Yortaç
66	MF	TUR	Ozan Sevim
70	FW	TUR	Sami Bircan
77	FW	AUT	Can Keleş
80	GK	TUR	Doğan Alemdar
90	FW	TUR	Semih Kılıçsoy
96	GK	TUR	Emir Yaşar

=== Out on loan ===
Note: Flags indicate national team as defined under FIFA eligibility rules; some limited exceptions apply. Players may hold more than one non-FIFA nationality.

No.	Pos.	Nation	Player
—	FW	TUR	Devrim Şahin (at Bodrum until 30 June 2027)
—	MF	COL	Élan Ricardo (at Győr until 30 June 2027)

No.	Pos.	Nation	Player
—	MF	TUR	Fahri Kerem Ay (at Çorluspor until 30 June 2027)
—	DF	TUR	Cumali Gürsel (at Bandırmaspor until 30 June 2027)

=== Other players under contract ===
Note: Flags indicate national team as defined under FIFA eligibility rules; some limited exceptions apply. Players may hold more than one non-FIFA nationality.

No.	Pos.	Nation	Player

=== Administrative staff ===
Position	Name
Chairman	(Turkey) Serdal Adalı
Second chairman	(Turkey) Murat Kılıç
Vice-chairman	(Turkey) Leman Özgür Rodoplu
Vice-chairman	(Turkey) Mithat Görkem Aksoy
General secretary	(Turkey) Uğur Fora
Treasurer	(Turkey) A. Orhan Özalp
Press spokesperson	(Turkey) Mete Düren
Board member	(Turkey) Aykan Aydın
Board member	(Turkey) Özkan Arseven
Board member	(Turkey) Mehmet Sarımermer
Board member	(Turkey) Arslan Küçükemre
Board member	(Turkey) Toygun Batallı
Board member	(Turkey) Üzeyir Engin
Board member	(Turkey) Cengiz Sarıkaya
Board member	(Turkey) İpek Seviye Gençer Yağcı
Board member	(Turkey) Ziya Fırat Gültekin

=== Coaching staff ===
Position	Name
Head coach	(Italy) Vincenzo Italiano
Assistant coach	(Italy) Daniel Niccolini
Assistant coach	(Italy) Stefano Firicano
Goalkeeper coach	(Italy) Vincenzo Sicignano
Goalkeeper coach	(Italy) Antonio Rosati
Athletic coach	(Italy) Piero Campo
Athletic coach	(Italy) Mirko Balestracci
Athletic coach	(Italy) Ivano Tito
Analyst	(Italy) Paolo Riela
Sport Scientist	(Turkey) Can Kolbakır

== Notable players ==
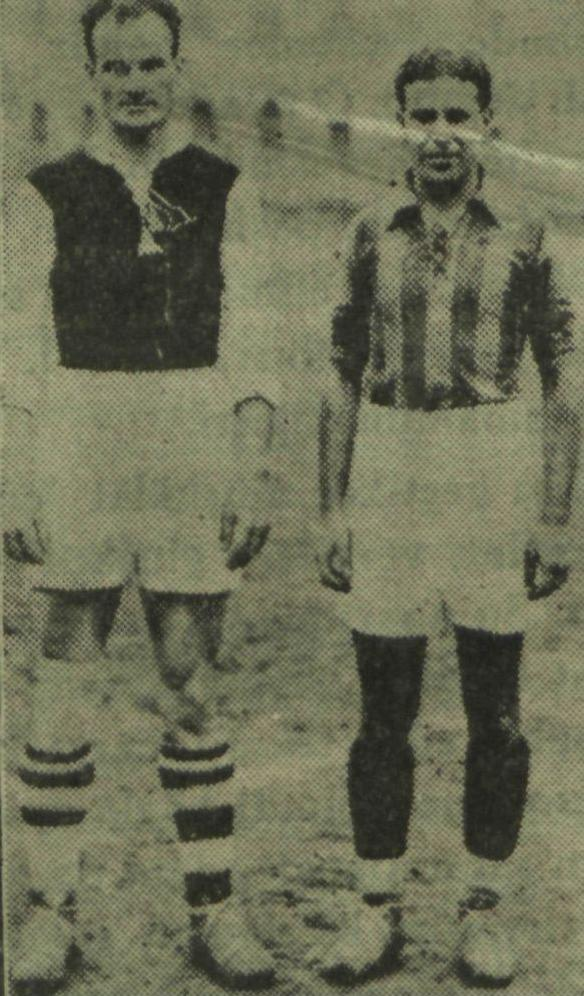
Former captain Hüsnü Savman and Fikret Arıcan (1932 Istanbul derby) both represented Turkey at the 1936 Summer Olympics.

Two figures served Beşiktaş both as player and as president: Hakkı Yeten and Süleyman Seba; both later received the title “Onursal Başkan” (Honorary President). Yeten also coached the first team between 1949 and 1951, while, in October 2008, the club and Beşiktaş Municipality unveiled a statue of Seba in Akaretler, near the headquarters.

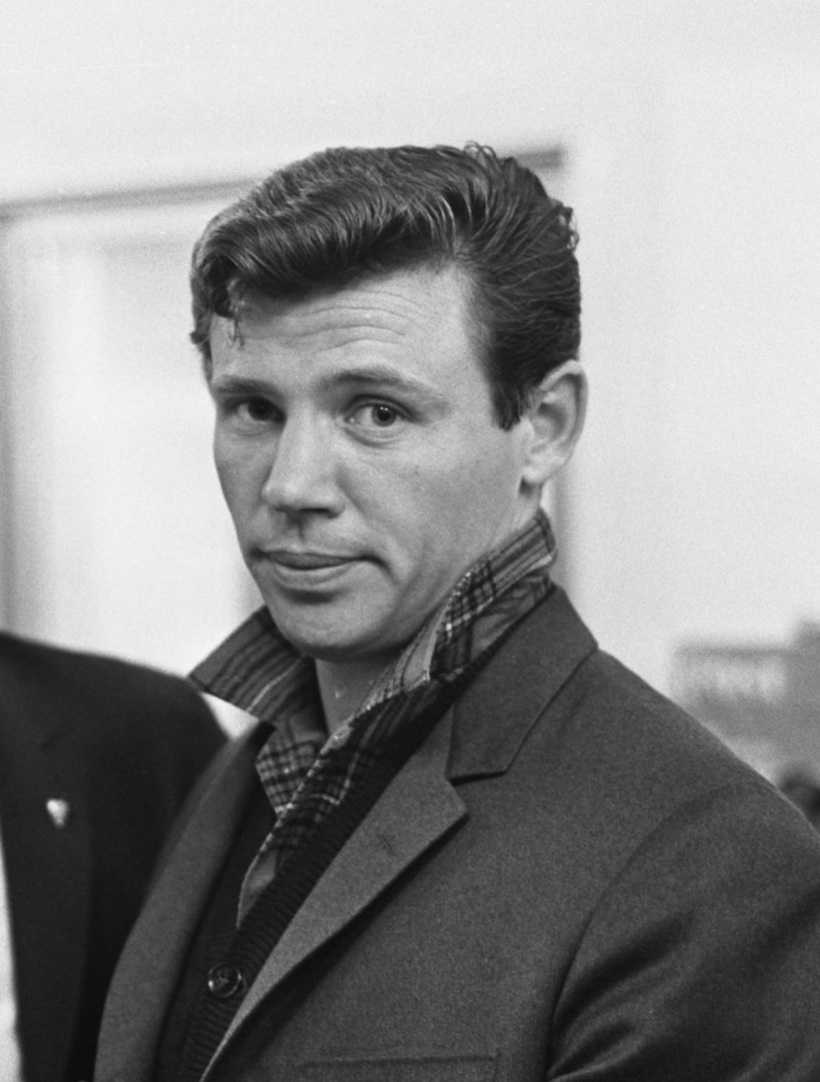
Necmi Mutlu (joined 1958) is Beşiktaş's longest-serving goalkeeper: 241 matches in 13 seasons.

A number of one-club players spent their entire senior careers at Beşiktaş—among them Yeten, Süleyman Oktay, Rıza Çalımbay, Samet Aybaba and Rasim Kara. Several later returned as head coach: Yeten, Çalımbay, Aybaba, Kara and Sergen Yalçın. Yalçın is the only person to have won the Süper Lig with Beşiktaş as both player (1990s title-winning squads) and head coach in 2020–21.

While at Beşiktaş, several players earned 30+ senior caps for Turkey, including Çalımbay, Recep Çetin, Mehmet Özdilek, Tayfur Havutçu, İbrahim Üzülmez and Oğuzhan Özyakup.

In 2003, the club's centenary year, Beşiktaş held a supporter poll to select its “squads of the century”. From 110 nominees, three XIs were named: the Golden, Silver and Bronze teams. Results were announced at a centenary gala on 21 June 2003, hosted by Beşiktaş supporters Çağla Kubat and Yılmaz Erdoğan.

Several Beşiktaş players have appeared at major FIFA and UEFA tournaments. Tayfur Havutçu and İlhan Mansız were in Turkey's 2002 FIFA World Cup squad: Mansız struck the golden goal against Senegal in the quarter-final (1–0 a.e.t.); Turkey then lost 0–1 to Brazil in the semi-final and beat hosts South Korea 3–2 for third place, with Mansız scoring twice. Ahmet Yıldırım and İbrahim Üzülmez played at the 2003 FIFA Confederations Cup, where Turkey finished third. Ricardo Quaresma won Euro 2016 with Portugal, scoring the round-of-16 winner against Croatia. Domagoj Vida reached the 2018 FIFA World Cup final with Croatia (2–4 v France) and assisted Ivan Perišić’s equaliser in that match.

== Coaching history ==
As of 5 June 2026

Since the formation of the football section in 1911, Beşiktaş have been led by Turkish and European coaches over more than a century. The first recorded coach was Şeref Bey, who organized and trained the side between 1911 and 1925 and remains the club's longest-serving coach with fourteen years in charge. Foreign appointments began in the mid-1940s—among the earliest were Englishman Charles Howard (1944–46) and Italian great Giuseppe Meazza (1948–49).

The club's most successful manager is Gordon Milne, who delivered three consecutive Süper Lig titles in 1990–91, 1991–92 and 1992–93, along with domestic cups in the same era. Beşiktaş later won the league under Mircea Lucescu (2002–03, the club's centenary season), Mustafa Denizli (2008–09), Şenol Güneş (back-to-back in 2015–16 and 2016–17), and Sergen Yalçın (a league and cup double in 2020–21). The bench has also featured figures such as Christoph Daum, John Toshack, Jean Tigana, Vicente del Bosque, Slaven Bilić, Carlos Carvalhal, Valérien Ismaël and Fernando Santos, as well as multiple caretaker spells by Serdar Topraktepe.

Season(s)	Manager
1911–25	(Turkey) Şeref Bey
1925–35	(Hungary) Imre Zinger
1935–44	(Turkey) Refik Osman Top
1944–46	(England) Charles Howard
1946–48	(Turkey) Refik Osman Top
1948–49	(Italy) Giuseppe Meazza
1949	(Turkey) Hakkı Yeten
1949–50	(England) Eric Keen
1950–51	(Turkey) Hakkı Yeten
1951–52	(England) Alfred Cable
1952–53	(Turkey) Sadri Usluoğlu
1953–54	(Italy) Sandro Puppo
1955–56	(Turkey) Cihat Arman
1956–57	(Hungary) József Mészáros
1957	(Turkey) Eşref Bilgiç
1957–58	(Italy) Leandro Remondini
1959	(Turkey) Hüseyin Saygun
1959–60	(Hungary) András Kuttik
1960–61	(Italy) Sandro Puppo
1961	(Turkey) Şeref Görkey
1961–62	(Hungary) András Kuttik
1962–63	(Socialist Federal Republic of Yugoslavia) Ljubiša Spajić
1963–64	(Austria) Ernst Melchior
1964–67	(Socialist Federal Republic of Yugoslavia) Ljubiša Spajić
1967–68	(Socialist Federal Republic of Yugoslavia) Jane Janevski
1968–69	(Bulgaria) Krum Milev
1969–70	(Socialist Federal Republic of Yugoslavia) Milovan Ćirić
1970–71	(Romania) Dumitru Teodorescu
1971–72	(Turkey) Gündüz Kılıç
1972–73	(Socialist Federal Republic of Yugoslavia) Abdulah Gegić
1973–74	(Turkey) Metin Türel
1974–75	(Germany) Horst Buhtz
1975–76	(Turkey) Gündüz Tekin Onay
1977	(Turkey) İsmet Arıkan
1977–78	(Socialist Federal Republic of Yugoslavia) Miloš Milutinović
1978–79	(Turkey) Doğan Andaç
1979–80	(Turkey) Serpil Hamdi Tüzün
1980	(Turkey) Metin Türel
1980–83	(Socialist Federal Republic of Yugoslavia) Đorđe Milić
1983–84	(Turkey) Ziya Taner

Season(s)	Manager
1984–86	(Socialist Federal Republic of Yugoslavia) Branko Stanković
1986–87	(Socialist Federal Republic of Yugoslavia) Miloš Milutinović
1987–93	(England) Gordon Milne
1994–96	(Germany) Christoph Daum
1996–97	(Turkey) Rasim Kara
1997–99	(Wales) John Toshack
1999	(Germany) Karl-Heinz Feldkamp
1999–00	(Germany) Hans-Peter Briegel
2000–01	(Italy) Nevio Scala
2001–02	(Germany) Christoph Daum
2002–04	(Romania) Mircea Lucescu
2004–05	(Spain) Vicente del Bosque
2005	(Turkey) Rıza Çalımbay
2005–07	(France) Jean Tigana
2007–08	(Turkey) Ertuğrul Sağlam
2008–10	(Turkey) Mustafa Denizli
2010–11	(Germany) Bernd Schuster
2011	(Turkey) Tayfur Havutçu
2011	(Germany) Roland Koch
2011–12	(Portugal) Carlos Carvalhal
2012	(Turkey) Tayfur Havutçu
2012–13	(Turkey) Samet Aybaba
2013–15	(Croatia) Slaven Bilić
2015–19	(Turkey) Şenol Güneş
2019–20	(Turkey) Abdullah Avcı
2020–21	(Turkey) Sergen Yalçın
2021–22	(Turkey) Önder Karaveli (C)
2022	(Turkey) Önder Karaveli
2022	(France) Valérien Ismaël
2022–23	(Turkey) Şenol Güneş
2023	(Turkey) Burak Yılmaz (C)
2023	(Turkey) Rıza Çalımbay
2023–24	(Turkey) Serdar Topraktepe (C)
2024	(Portugal) Fernando Santos
2024	(Turkey) Serdar Topraktepe (C)
2024	(Netherlands) Giovanni van Bronckhorst
2024–25	(Turkey) Serdar Topraktepe (C)
2025	(Norway) Ole Gunnar Solskjær
2025–26	(Turkey) Sergen Yalçın
2026–	(Italy) Vincenzo Italiano

== Presidential history ==
As of 29 November 2024

The presidency of Beşiktaş has traditionally been held by figures from Istanbul's civic and business life. Early leaders included founding member Mehmet Şamil Şhaplı, Şükrü Paşa and Fuat Paşa, followed by multiple non-consecutive terms for Fuat Balkan during the 1918–38 period. The club's longest-serving president, Süleyman Seba (1984–2000), oversaw a modernisation drive and the team's early-1990s dominance under Gordon Milne, including three straight league titles (1990–91, 1991–92, 1992–93) among other domestic trophies.

In the 2000s, Serdar Bilgili (2000–04) and Yıldırım Demirören (2004–12) presided over renewed commercial growth and cup success; Beşiktaş won the Turkish Cup in 2006 and 2007 and the inaugural Turkish Super Cup in 2006. Under Fikret Orman (2012–19) the club rebuilt its stadium, opening Vodafone Park on 11 April 2016, and captured back-to-back league titles in 2015–16 and 2016–17.

Ahmet Nur Çebi (2019–23) guided a period of financial consolidation and was in office for the 2020–21 league and cup double under Sergen Yalçın. Hasan Arat was elected in November 2023, and Serdal Adalı succeeded him in 2025.

Season(s)	President
1903–08	(Turkey) Mehmet Şamil Şhaplı
1908–11	(Turkey) Şükrü Paşa
1911–18	(Turkey) Fuat Paşa
1918–23	(Turkey) Fuat Balkan
1923–24	(Turkey) Salih Bey
1924–26	(Turkey) Ahmet Fetgeri Aşeni
1926–28	(Turkey) Fuat Balkan
1928–30	(Turkey) Ahmet Fetgeri Aşeni
1930–32	(Turkey) Emin Şükrü Kunt
1932–35	(Turkey) A. Ziya Karamürsel
1935–38	(Turkey) Fuat Balkan
1938–39	(Turkey) A. Ziya Karamürsel
1939–41	(Turkey) Yusuf Ziya Erdem
1941–42	(Turkey) A. Ziya Karamürsel
1942–50	(Turkey) A. Ziya Kozanoğlu
1950	(Turkey) Ekrem Amaç
1950–52	(Turkey) Salih Keçeci
1952–55	(Turkey) A. Ziya Kozanoğlu
1955–56	(Turkey) Tahir Söğütlü
1956–57	(Turkey) Danyal Akbel
1957	(Turkey) Ferhat Nasır
1957–58	(Turkey) Nuri Togay
1958	(Turkey) Enver Kaya
1958–60	(Turkey) Nuri Togay
1960–63	(Turkey) Hakkı Yeten

Season(s)	President
1963–64	(Turkey) Selahattin Akel
1964–66	(Turkey) Hakkı Yeten
1966–67	(Turkey) Hasan Salman
1967–68	(Turkey) Hakkı Yeten
1968–69	(Turkey) Talat Asal
1969–70	(Turkey) Rüştü Erkuş
1970	(Turkey) Nuri Togay
1970–71	(Turkey) Agasi Şen
1971–72	(Turkey) Himmet Ünlü
1972–73	(Turkey) Şekip Okçuoğlu
1973–77	(Turkey) Mehmet Üstünkaya
1977–79	(Turkey) Gazi Akınal
1979	(Turkey) Hüseyin Cevahir
1979–80	(Turkey) Gazi Akınal
1980–81	(Turkey) Rıza Kumruoğlu
1981–84	(Turkey) Mehmet Üstünkaya
1984–00	(Turkey) Süleyman Seba
2000–04	(Turkey) Serdar Bilgili
2004–12	(Turkey) Yıldırım Demirören
2012–19	(Turkey) Fikret Orman
2019–23	(Turkey) Ahmet Nur Çebi
2023–24	(Turkey) Hasan Arat
2024	(Turkey) Hüseyin Yücel (I)
2025–	(Turkey) Serdal Adalı

== Ownership and finances ==
Beşiktaş J.K. is a member-owned association; the president and board are elected by the club's general assembly under the club statute. Football operations are carried by the listed company Beşiktaş Futbol Yatırımları Sanayi ve Ticaret A.Ş. (BJKAS), which has traded on Borsa Istanbul since 20 February 2002. As of the latest disclosure, the association holds 70.12% of BJKAS, with a 29.88% free float.

BJKAS reports on a financial year running 1 June–31 May and publishes quarterly/annual activity reports and financial statements via its investor-relations portal and Turkey's public disclosure platform. The group structure includes subsidiaries in merchandising (Beşiktaş Sportif Ürünler A.Ş.), media (Beşiktaş Televizyon Yayıncılık A.Ş.), travel/ticketing and other services supporting the football business.

Like other Turkish clubs, Beşiktaş participated in the sector-wide bank debt restructuring led by the Turkish Banks Association in 2019 (maturity up to five years with a two-year principal grace period), aimed at stabilising club finances amid lira volatility.

== Affiliated clubs ==
The following clubs are affiliated with Beşiktaş, mainly for academy development, scouting and player/staff exchange:

- (Turkey) Adanaspor (2015–present) – “goodwill/co-operation protocol” signed in Antalya; framed as a long-term, mutually beneficial partnership.
- (Kosovo) KF 2 Korriku (2021–present) – formal agreement for youth academy and sports-school cooperation signed in Istanbul (Beşiktaş: Fırat Fidan / 2 Korriku: Rexhep Baholli).
- (Turkey) Kartal Bulvarspor (2022–present) – cooperation framework to give Beşiktaş youth players competitive minutes in TFF 3. Lig and enable two-way player/coach exchange.
