= 1984–85 Galatasaray S.K. season =

Galatasaray
1984–85 season
- President: Ali Uras
- Manager: Jupp Derwall
- Stadium: İnönü Stadı
- 1. Lig: 5th
- Türkiye Kupası: Winner
- Süper Kupa: Runner-up
- Top goalscorer: League: Rüdiger Abramczik (9); Erdal Keser (9); All: Rüdiger Abramczik (10); Erdal Keser (10)
- Highest home attendance: 41,227 vs Fenerbahçe SK (1. Lig, 30 September 1984)
- Lowest home attendance: 2,740 vs Kocaelispor (1. Lig, 18 May 1985)
- Average home league attendance: 21,027
| Home colours | Away colours | Third colours |

The 1984–85 season was Galatasaray's 81st in existence and the 27th consecutive season in the 1. Lig. This article shows statistics of the club's players in the season, and also lists all matches that the club have played in the season.

== Squad statistics ==
| No. | Pos. | Name | 1. Lig | | Türkiye Kupası | | Süper Kupa | | Total | |
| No. | Pos. | Name | Apps | Goals | Apps | Goals | Apps | Goals | Apps | Goals |
|---|---|---|---|---|---|---|---|---|---|---|
| - | GK | (Socialist Federal Republic of Yugoslavia) Zoran Simović | 28 | 0 | 10 | 0 | 1 | 0 | 39 | 0 |
| - | GK | (Turkey) Haydar Erdoğan | 6 | 0 | 1 | 0 | 0 | 0 | 7 | 0 |
| - | DF | (Turkey) Fatih Terim (C) | 30 | 0 | 8 | 3 | 1 | 0 | 39 | 3 |
| - | DF | (Turkey) Ahmet Ceyhan | 23 | 0 | 8 | 0 | 1 | 0 | 32 | 0 |
| - | DF | (Turkey) İsmail Demiriz | 33 | 0 | 9 | 1 | 1 | 0 | 43 | 1 |
| - | DF | (Turkey) Semih Yuvakuran | 22 | 0 | 7 | 0 | 1 | 0 | 30 | 0 |
| - | DF | (Turkey) Cüneyt Tanman | 31 | 2 | 10 | 0 | 1 | 0 | 42 | 2 |
| - | DF | (Turkey) Halil İbrahim Akçay | 13 | 2 | 3 | 0 | 1 | 0 | 17 | 0 |
| - | DF | (Turkey) Sefer Karaer | 7 | 0 | 2 | 0 | 1 | 0 | 10 | 0 |
| - | DF | (Turkey) Yusuf Altıntaş | 19 | 1 | 7 | 0 | 0 | 0 | 26 | 1 |
| - | DF | (Turkey) Raşit Çetiner | 28 | 3 | 8 | 1 | 1 | 0 | 37 | 4 |
| - | MF | (Turkey) Adnan Esen | 30 | 2 | 10 | 1 | 1 | 0 | 42 | 3 |
| - | MF | (Turkey) Mustafa Ergücü | 10 | 0 | 3 | 0 | 0 | 0 | 13 | 0 |
| - | MF | (Turkey) Metin Yıldız | 7 | 0 | 1 | 0 | 0 | 0 | 8 | 0 |
| - | FW | (Turkey) Bülent Alkılıç | 26 | 2 | 9 | 1 | 1 | 1 | 36 | 4 |
| - | FW | (Turkey) Barbaros Erdem | 3 | 0 | 1 | 0 | 0 | 0 | 4 | 0 |
| - | FW | (Turkey) Rıza Tuyuran | 3 | 0 | 0 | 0 | 0 | 0 | 3 | 0 |
| - | FW | (Turkey) Ayhan Akbin | 1 | 0 | 0 | 0 | 0 | 0 | 1 | 0 |
| - | FW | (Turkey) Hakan Çarkacı | 11 | 0 | 2 | 1 | 0 | 0 | 13 | 1 |
| - | FW | (Turkey) Burak Dilmen | 29 | 3 | 6 | 3 | 1 | 0 | 36 | 6 |
| - | FW | (Turkey) Levent Erköse | 16 | 3 | 4 | 1 | 0 | 0 | 20 | 7 |
| - | FW | (Germany) Rüdiger Abramczik | 30 | 9 | 9 | 1 | 1 | 0 | 40 | 10 |
| - | FW | (Turkey) Erdal Keser | 22 | 9 | 6 | 1 | 0 | 0 | 28 | 10 |

=== Players in / out ===
==== In ====
| Pos. | Nat. | Name | Age | Moving from |
|---|---|---|---|---|
| GK | (Socialist Federal Republic of Yugoslavia) | Zoran Simović | 30 | Hajduk Split |
| DF | (Turkey) | İsmail Demiriz | 22 | Gençlerbirliği SK |
| DF | (Turkey) | Yusuf Altıntaş | 23 | Kocaelispor |
| DF | (Turkey) | Semih Yuvakuran | 21 | Bursaspor |
| FW | (Germany) | Rüdiger Abramczik | 28 | 1. FC Nürnberg |
| FW | (Turkey) | Erdal Keser | 23 | Borussia Dortmund |
| FW | (Turkey) | Rıza Tuyuran | 24 | Fatih Karagümrük SK |
| FW | (Turkey) | Burak Dilmen | 21 | Samsunspor |
| FW | (Turkey) | Levent Erköse | 25 | Trabzonspor |

==== Out ====
| Pos. | Nat. | Name | Age | Moving to |
|---|---|---|---|---|
| FW | (Turkey) | Mustafa Denizli | 35 | Career end |
| FW | (Socialist Federal Republic of Yugoslavia) | Tarik Hodžić | 33 | Sarıyer G.K. |
| MF | (Socialist Federal Republic of Yugoslavia) | Mirsad Sejdić | 31 | Bursaspor |
| GK | (Turkey) | Eser Özaltındere | 30 | Sakaryaspor |
| FW | (Turkey) | Sinan Turhan | 26 | Sakaryaspor |
| MF | (Turkey) | Ahmet Keloğlu | 22 | Kocaelispor |
| DF | (Turkey) | Abdülfettah Dindar | 29 | Tarsus İdman Yurdu |
| FW | (Turkey) | Ayhan Akbin | 29 | Zonguldakspor |
| FW | (Turkey) | Öner Kılıç | 30 | Denizlispor |

== 1. Lig ==
=== Standings ===
| Pos | Team | Pld | W | D | L | GF | GA | GD | Pts | Qualification or relegation |
|---|---|---|---|---|---|---|---|---|---|---|
| 3 | Trabzonspor | 34 | 14 | 14 | 6 | 38 | 26 | +12 | 42 | Invitation to Balkans Cup |
| 4 | MKE Ankaragücü | 34 | 12 | 14 | 8 | 33 | 27 | +6 | 38 | |
| 5 | Galatasaray | 34 | 11 | 14 | 9 | 34 | 28 | +6 | 36 | Qualification to Cup Winners' Cup first round |
| 6 | Sakaryaspor | 34 | 14 | 8 | 12 | 44 | 39 | +5 | 36 | |
| 7 | Kocaelispor | 34 | 11 | 12 | 11 | 30 | 31 | −1 | 34 | |

Rules for classification: 1) points; 2) goal difference; 3) number of goals scored.

=== Matches ===
Kick-off listed in local time (EET)

| 26 August 1984 1 | Galatasaray SK | 0–1 | Denizlispor | Istanbul |
| 17:00 EET | | (Report) | Mehmet Hacıoğlu 18' | Stadium: Fenerbahçe Stadı; Attendance: 21,999; Referee: Nihat Gülşen |

| 1 September 1984 2 | Galatasaray SK | 2–1 | Malatyaspor | Istanbul |
| 17:00 EET | Erdal Keser 23'; Levent Erköse 34' | (Report) | Levent Numanoğlu 87' | Stadium: İnönü Stadı; Attendance: 39,315; Referee: Yavuz Karaozan |

| 9 September 1984 3 | Eskişehirspor | 3–0 | Galatasaray SK | Eskişehir |
| 15:30 EET | Ahmet Kılıç 23'; Zafer Tüzün 32'; Erdoğan Koç 85' | (Report) | | Stadium: Atatürk Stadı; Referee: Necmi Temizel |

| 16 September 1984 4 | Antalyaspor | 0–3 | Galatasaray SK | Antalya |
| 15:30 EET | | (Report) | Rüdigar Abramczik 69'; Mustafa Ergücü 79'; Burak Dilmen 85' | Stadium: Atatürk Stadı; Referee: Çoşkun Kutay |

| 22 September 1984 5 | Galatasaray SK | 1–1 | Ankaragücü | Istanbul |
| 15:30 EET | Cüneyt Tanman 2' | (Report) | Halil İbrahm Eren 50' | Stadium: Fenerbahçe Stadı; Attendance: 28,567; Referee: İhsan Türe |

| 30 September 1984 6 | Galatasaray SK | 1–1 | Fenerbahçe SK | Istanbul |
| 15:30 EET | Erdal Keser 42' | (Report) | Dusan Pesic 61' | Stadium: İnönü Stadı; Attendance: 41,227; Referee: Ayhan Köseoğlu |

| 7 October 1984 7 | Bursaspor | 1–1 | Galatasaray SK | Bursa |
| 15:30 EET | Mirsad Sejdic 37' | (Report) | Burak Dilmen 58' | Stadium: Atatürk Stadı; Referee: Talat Tokat |

| 14 October 1984 8 | Galatasaray SK | 0–0 | Sakaryaspor | Istanbul |
| 15:30 EET | | (Report) | | Stadium: İnönü Stadı; Attendance: 30,709; Referee: Ahmet Akçay |

| 21 October 1984 9 | Beşiktaş JK | 1–3 | Galatasaray SK | Istanbul |
| 15:30 EET | Dževad Šećerbegović 77' | (Report) | Erdal Keser 27', 35'; Rüdigar Abramczik 27' | Stadium: İnönü Stadı; Attendance: 31,532; Referee: Yalçın Darıcı |

| 4 November 1984 10 | Boluspor | 0–0 | Galatasaray SK | Bolu |
| 13:00 EET | | (Report) | | Stadium: Bolu Şehir Stadı; Referee: Çoşkun Evin |

| 17 November 1984 11 | Galatasaray SK | 2–0 | Orduspor | Istanbul |
| 14:00 EET | Rüdigar Abramczik 6'; Erdal Keser 84' | (Report) | | Stadium: İnönü Stadı; Attendance: 21,239; Referee: Şeref Kurtdemir |

| 25 November 1984 12 | Galatasaray SK | 2–1 | Sarıyer G.K. | Istanbul |
| 14:00 EET | Adnan Esen 49'; Raşit Çetiner 89' | (Report) | Rıdvan Dilmen 46' | Stadium: İnönü Stadı; Referee: Yusuf Namoğlu |

| 2 December 1984 13 | Trabzonspor | 1–0 | Galatasaray SK | Trabzon |
| 12:30 EET | Kemal Serdar 9' | (Report) | | Stadium: Hüseyin Avni Aker Stadı; Referee: İbrahim Acar |

| 8 December 1984 14 | Galatasaray SK | 1–1 | Zonguldakspor | Istanbul |
| 13:00 EET | Levent Erköse 59' | (Report) | Muzaffer Badalıoğlu 88' | Stadium: Fenerbahçe Stadı; Attendance: 15,604; Referee: Talat Tokat |

| 16 December 1984 15 | Kocaelispor | 1–0 | Galatasaray SK | Izmit |
| 13:00 EET | Senad Ibric 40' | (Report) | | Stadium: İsmet Paşa Stadium; Referee: Sadık Deda |

| 23 December 1984 16 | Galatasaray SK | 2–1 | Gençlerbirliği SK | Istanbul |
| 13:00 EET | Rüdigar Abramczik 67'; Raşit Çetiner 86' | (Report) | Osman Özdemir 5' | Stadium: İnönü Stadı; Referee: Ahmet Akçay |

| 30 December 1984 17 | Altay SK | 0–1 | Galatasaray SK | İzmir |
| 13:00 EET | | (Report) | Rüdigar Abramczik 78' | Stadium: Atatürk Stadı; Attendance: 22,151; Referee: Çoşkun Kutay |

| 20 January 1985 18 | Denizlispor | 0–0 | Galatasaray SK | Denizli |
| 14:00 EET | | (Report) | | Stadium: Atatürk Stadı; Referee: Oğuz Sarvan |

| 27 January 1985 19 | Malatyaspor | 0–0 | Galatasaray SK | Malatya |
| 13:30 EET | | (Report) | | Stadium: Malatya İnönü Stadı; Referee: İlyas Ayan |

| 2 February 1985 20 | Galatasaray SK | 3–1 | Eskişehirspor | Istanbul |
| 14:00 EET | Erdal Keser 4', 10'; Burak Dilmen 67' | (Report) | Burhanettin Beadini 60' | Stadium: İnönü Stadı; Attendance: 20,445; Referee: İbrahim Acar |

| 10 February 1985 21 | Galatasaray SK | 1–2 | Antalyaspor | Istanbul |
| 14:00 EET | Rüdigar Abramczik 19' | (Report) | Fuat Yaman 2'; Haluk Çınar 57' | Stadium: İnönü Stadı; Attendance: 29,268; Referee: Hamza Alan |

| 17 February 1985 22 | MKE Ankaragücü | 1–0 | Galatasaray SK | Ankara |
| 14:00 EET | Halil İbrahim Eren 13' | (Report) | | Stadium: Ankara 19 Mayıs Stadı; Attendance: 12,069; Referee: Hasan Ceylan |

| 3 March 1985 23 | Fenerbahçe SK | 2–2 | Galatasaray SK | Istanbul |
| 15:00 EET | Hasan Özdemir 20'; Selçuk Yula 71' (pen.) | (Report) | Cüneyt Tanman 7'; Yusuf Altıntaş 71' | Stadium: Fenerbahçe Stadı; Attendance: 30,360; Referee: Özcan Oal |

| 9 March 1985 24 | Galatasaray SK | 1–2 | Bursaspor | Istanbul |
| 15:00 EET | Erdal Keser 67' | (Report) | Cemal Vardar 16'; Mirsad Sejdic 60' | Stadium: İnönü Stadı; Attendance: 19,972; Referee: Çoşkun Kutay |

| 17 March 1985 25 | Sakaryaspor | 0–1 | Galatasaray SK | Adapazarı |
| 15:00 EET | | (Report) | Bülent Alkılıç 82' | Stadium: Adapazarı Atatürk Stadı; Referee: Ali İhsan Papatya |

| 24 March 1985 26 | Galatasaray SK | 0–0 | Beşiktaş JK | Istanbul |
| 15:00 EET | | (Report) | | Stadium: İnönü Stadı; Attendance: 20,857; Referee: Çoşkun Kutay |

| 6 April 1985 27 | Galatasaray SK | 0–0 | Boluspor | Istanbul |
| 15:00 EET | | (Report) | | Stadium: İnönü Stadı; Attendance: 9,445; Referee: Erdoğan Çamlıyurt |

| 14 April 1985 28 | Orduspor | 1–1 | Galatasaray SK | Ordu |
| 13:30 EET | Yücel Uyar 28' | (Report) | Levent Erköse 52' | Stadium: Ordu 19 Eylül Stadı; Referee: Oğuz Sarvan |

| 21 April 1985 29 | Sarıyer G.K. | 0–0 | Galatasaray SK | Istanbul |
| 15:00 EET | | (Report) | | Stadium: İnönü Stadı; Attendance: 9,899; Referee: Yusuf Namoğlu |

| 5 May 1985 30 | Galatasaray SK | 2–0 | Trabzonspor | Istanbul |
| 16:00 EET | Rüdigar Abramczik 8', 32' | (Report) | | Stadium: İnönü Stadı; Attendance: 14,019; Referee: Çoşkun Evin |

| 12 May 1985 31 | Zonguldakspor | 2–1 | Galatasaray SK | Zonguldak |
| 16:00 EET | Savaş Demirel 11', 49' | (Report) | Raşit Çetiner 36' | Stadium: Zonguldak Şehir Stadı; Referee: Ahmet Akçay |

| 18 May 1985 32 | Galatasaray SK | 2–1 | Kocaelispor | Istanbul |
| 16:00 EET | Rüdigar Abramczik 20'; Bülent Alkılınç 57' | (Report) | Haluk Turfan 66' | Stadium: Fenerbahçe Stadı; Attendance: 2,740; Referee: Serdar Çakman |

| 26 May 1985 33 | Gençlerbirliği SK | 2–1 | Galatasaray SK | Ankara |
| 16:00 EET | Ahmet Ceyhan 5' (o.g.); Avni Okumuş 63' (pen.) | (Report) | Adnan Esen 15' | Stadium: Ankara 19 Mayıs Stadı; Referee: İhsan Türe |

| 2 June 1985 34 | Galatasaray SK | 0–0 | Altay SK | Istanbul |
| 16:00 EET | | (Report) | | Stadium: İnönü Stadı; Referee: Talat Tokat |

== Türkiye Kupası ==
Kick-off listed in local time (EET)

=== 3rd Round ===
| 20 November 1984 1 | Altay SK | 1–1 | Galatasaray SK | İzmir |
| 14:00 EET | Turgut Uçar 51' | (Report) | Bülent Alkılıç 75' | Stadium: Atatürk Stadı; Attendance: 7,000; Referee: Talat Tokat |

| 5 December 1984 2 | Galatasaray SK | 2–1 | Altay SK | Istanbul |
| 11:00 EET | Fatih Terim 31' (pen.); Erdal Keser 86' | (Report) | Mahmut Kılıç 37' | Stadium: İnönü Stadı; Referee: Osman Erdal Fırat |

=== 4th Round ===
| 19 December 1984 1 | Sarıyer G.K. | 0–3 | Galatasaray SK | Istanbul |
| 13:00 EET | | (Report) | Burak Dilmen 18', 50', 85' | Stadium: İnönü Stadı; Attendance: 14,072; Referee: Özcan Oal |

| 26 December 1984 2 | Galatasaray SK | 2–0 | Sarıyer G.K. | Istanbul |
| 13:00 EET | Levent Erköse 48'; Hakan Çarkacı 68' | (Report) | | Stadium: İnönü Stadı; Referee: Erkan Göksel |

=== 1/4 Final ===
| 6 February 1984 1 | Fenerbahçe SK | 1–2 | Galatasaray SK | Istanbul |
| 14:00 EET | Müjdat Yetkiner 6' | (Report) | Raşit Çetiner 2'; Fatih Terim 21' (pen.) | Stadium: Fenerbahçe Stadı; Attendance: 15,000; Referee: Yalçın Darıcı |

| 28 February 1984 2 | Galatasaray SK | 1–0 | Fenerbahçe SK | Istanbul |
| 15:30 EET | Adnan Esen 60' | (Report) | | Stadium: İnönü Stadı; Attendance: 31,638; Referee: Yusuf Namoğlu |

=== 1/2 Final ===
| 13 March 1985 1 | Galatasaray SK | 0–0 | Beşiktaş JK | Istanbul |
| 15:00 EET | | (Report) | | Stadium: Fenerbahçe Stadı; Attendance: 21,271; Referee: Aykan Köseoğlu |

| 20 March 1985 2 | Beşiktaş JK | 0–1 | Galatasaray SK | Istanbul |
| 15:00 EET | | (Report) | Rüdiger Abramczik 46' | Stadium: İnönü Stadı; Attendance: 26,665; Referee: Yusuf Namoğlu |

=== Final ===
| 10 April 1985 1 | Trabzonspor | 1–2 | Galatasaray SK | Trabzon |
| 15:00 EET | Bahaddin Güneş 76' | (Report) | İsmail Demiriz 44'; Fatih Terim 61' | Stadium: Hüseyin Avni Aker Stadı; Referee: İhsan Türe |

| 17 April 1985 2 | Galatasaray SK | 0–0 | Trabzonspor | Istanbul |
| 15:00 EET | | (Report) | | Stadium: İnönü Stadı; Attendance: 21,214; Referee: Talat Tokat |

== Süper Kupa-Cumhurbaşkanlığı Kupası ==
Kick-off listed in local time (EET)

| 12 June 1985 1 | Fenerbahçe SK | 1–1 | Galatasaray SK | Ankara |
| 17:00 EET | Hüseyin Çakıroğlu 78' | (Report) | Bülent Alkılıç 37' | Stadium: 19 Mayıs Stadı; Attendance: 18,757; Referee: Sadık Deda |

== Friendly Matches ==
Kick-off listed in local time (EET)

=== TSYD Kupası ===
| 15 August 1984 1 | Beşiktaş JK | 1–1 | Galatasaray SK | Istanbul |
| 17:00 EET | Mirsad Kovačevič 51' | (Report) | Erdal Keser 33' | Stadium: İnönü Stadı; Attendance: 28,532; Referee: Yusuf Namoğlu |

| 19 August 1984 2 | Galatasaray SK | 0–0 | Fenerbahçe SK | Istanbul |
| 17:00 EET | | (Report) | | Stadium: İnönü Stadı; Attendance: 39,860; Referee: Erkan Göksel |

=== Donanma Kupası ===
| 9 January 1985 1 | Galatasaray SK | 0–0 | Beşiktaş JK | Istanbul |
| 14:00 EET | | (Report) | | Stadium: İnönü Stadı; Attendance: 8,629; Referee: Yüksel Okçuoğlu |

| 12 January 1985 2 | Fenerbahçe SK | 2–1 | Galatasaray SK | Istanbul |
| 14:00 EET | Tuğrul Duru 15'; İlyas Tüfekçi 51' | (Report) | Raşit Çetiner 61' | Stadium: Fenerbahçe Stadı; Attendance: 6,123; Referee: Erkan Göksel |

| 13 January 1985 2 | Sarıyer G.K. | 4–1 | Galatasaray SK | Istanbul |
| 12:00 EET | Engin Ülker 65'; Tarik Hodžić 71', 85', 88' | (Report) | Rüdiger Abramczik 73' | Stadium: İnönü Stadı; Referee: Yahya Diker |

== Attendance ==
| Competition | Av. Att. | Total Att. |
|---|---|---|
| 1. Lig | 21,027 | 315,406 |
| Türkiye Kupası | 24,708 | 74,123 |
| Total | 21,641 | 389,529 |
