= 1983–84 Galatasaray S.K. season =

Galatasaray
1983–84 season
- President: (Turkey) Ali Uras
- Manager: (Socialist Federal Republic of Yugoslavia) Tomislav Ivić
- Stadium: Ali Sami Yen Stadı
- 1. Lig: 3rd
- Türkiye Kupası: 1/4 Final
- Top goalscorer: League: Tarik Hodžić (16); All: Tarik Hodžić (17)
- Highest home attendance: 36,658 vs Trabzonspor (1. Lig, 20 November 1984)
- Lowest home attendance: 6,805 vs Altınordu S.K. (Türkiye Kupası, 12 April 1984)
- Average home league attendance: 26,274
Home colours

The 1983–84 season was Galatasaray's 80th in existence and the 26th consecutive season in the 1. Lig. This article shows statistics of the club's players in the season, and also lists all matches that the club have played in the season.

== Squad statistics ==
No.	Pos.	Name	1. Lig		Türkiye Kupası		Total	
No.	Pos.	Name	Apps	Goals	Apps	Goals	Apps	Goals
-	GK	(Turkey) Eser Özaltındere	10	0	2	0	12	0
-	GK	(Turkey) Haydar Erdoğan	24	0	4	0	28	0
-	DF	(Turkey) Fatih Terim (C)	28	0	5	0	33	0
-	DF	(Turkey) Rauf Kılıç	2	1	1	0	22	1
-	DF	(Turkey) Cüneyt Tanman	29	2	6	2	35	4
-	DF	(Turkey) Ahmet Ceyhan	20	0	4	1	24	1
-	DF	(Turkey) Halil İbrahim Akçay	12	0	1	0	13	0
-	DF	(Turkey) Raşit Çetiner	31	3	5	1	36	4
-	DF	(Turkey) Ali Çoban	34	1	6	0	40	1
-	MF	(Turkey) Adnan Esen	27	1	4	0	31	1
-	MF	(Turkey) Ahmet Keloğlu	22	3	4	1	26	4
-	MF	(Turkey) Mustafa Ergücü	27	7	3	1	30	8
-	MF	(Turkey) Metin Yıldız	26	1	5	0	31	1
-	FW	(Turkey) Öner Kılıç	26	1	4	0	30	1
-	FW	(Turkey) Bülent Alkılıç	21	2	4	0	25	2
-	FW	(Turkey) Sabahattin İspirli	1	0	0	0	1	0
-	FW	(Turkey) Birol Yalçın	6	1	1	0	7	1
-	FW	(Turkey) Sinan Turhan	16	1	2	0	18	1
-	FW	(Turkey) Mustafa Denizli	15	3	4	2	19	5
-	FW	(Socialist Federal Republic of Yugoslavia) Tarik Hodžić	31	16	6	1	37	17
-	FW	(Socialist Federal Republic of Yugoslavia) Mirsad Sejdić	22	10	4	0	26	10

=== Players in / out ===
==== In ====
Pos.	Nat.	Name	Age	Moving from
MF	(Turkey)	Mustafa Denizli	34	Altay SK

==== Out ====
Pos.	Nat.	Name	Age	Moving to
FW	(Turkey)	Sinan Turhan	25	Sakaryaspor
FW	(Turkey)	Mustafa Turgat	26	

== 1. Lig ==
=== Standings ===
Pos	Team	Pld	W	D	L	GF	GA	GD	Pts	Qualification or relegation
1	Trabzonspor (C)	34	18	14	2	43	14	+29	50	Qualification to European Cup first round
2	Fenerbahçe	34	17	11	6	46	24	+22	45	Qualification to UEFA Cup first round
3	Galatasaray	34	17	10	7	54	29	+25	44	Invitation to Balkans Cup
4	Beşiktaş	34	17	10	7	40	21	+19	44	Qualification to Cup Winners' Cup first round
5	MKE Ankaragücü	34	9	16	9	27	22	+5	34	Invitation to Balkans Cup

Rules for classification: 1) points; 2) goal difference; 3) number of goals scored.
(C) Champions

=== Matches ===
Kick-off listed in local time (EET)

21 August 1983 1	Fatih Karagümrük SK	0–4	Galatasaray SK	Istanbul
18:00 EET		(Report)	Mirsad Sejdić 7' (pen.); Tarik Hodžić 61', 85'; Mustafa Denizli 87'	Stadium: Fenerbahçe Stadı; Referee: Yusuf Namoğlu

27 August 1983 2	Galatasaray SK	3–1	Adanaspor	Istanbul
18:00 EET	Mirsad Sejdić 45', 82' (pen.); Tarik Hodžić 85'	(Report)	İsmail Akbaşlı 18'	Stadium: Ali Sami Yen Stadı; Attendance: 32,482; Referee: Hasan Ceylan

4 September 1983 3	MKE Ankaragücü	2–1	Galatasaray SK	Ankara
16:30 EET	Halil İbrahim Eren 31' (pen.); Sadık Aksöz 72'	(Report)	Mirsad Sejdić 37' (pen.)	Stadium: Ankara 19 Mayıs Stadı; Attendance: 24,374; Referee: Necmi Temizel

11 September 1983 4	Galatasaray SK	3–0	Denizlispor	Istanbul
16:30 EET	Mustafa Ergücü 34'; Tarik Hodžić 46'; Birol Yalçın 90'	(Report)		Stadium: Ali Sami Yen Stadı; Attendance: 35,531; Referee: İlyas Ayan

18 September 1983 5	Zonguldakspor	0–2	Galatasaray SK	Zonguldak
16:30 EET		(Report)	Mustafa Ergücü 18'; Ahmet Keloğlu 84'	Stadium: Kemal Köksal Stadium; Referee: İbrahim Acar

24 September 1983 6	Galatasaray SK	1–1	Bursaspor	Istanbul
16:30 EET	Tarik Hodžić 51'	(Report)	Sedat Özden 87'	Stadium: Fenerbahçe Stadı; Referee: Talat Tokat

2 October 1983 7	Galatasaray SK	2–1	Antalyaspor	Istanbul
15:30 EET	Tarik Hodžić 42'; Mustafa Denizli 71' (pen.)	(Report)	Mehmet Özkul 90'	Stadium: Ali Sami Yen Stadı; Attendance: 20,096; Referee: Ahmet Akçay

9 October 1983 8	Gençlerbirliği	0–0	Galatasaray SK	Ankara
15:30 EET		(Report)		Stadium: Ankara 19 Mayıs Stadı; Attendance: 25,772; Referee: İlyas Ayan

16 October 1983 9	Galatasaray SK	2–0	Orduspor	Istanbul
15:30 EET	Tarik Hodžić 57', 67'	(Report)		Stadium: Ali Sami Yen Stadı; Attendance: 35,635; Referee: Coşkun Evin

2 November 1983 10	Fenerbahçe SK	1–2	Galatasaray SK	Istanbul
15:00 EET	Srebrenko Repčić 65'	(Report)	Öner Kılıç 15'; Mirsad Sejdić 80'	Stadium: Fenerbahçe Stadı; Attendance: 31,949; Referee: Yusuf Namoğlu

12 November 1983 11	Kocaelispor	0–0	Galatasaray SK	İzmit
15:00 EET		(Report)		Stadium: İsmet Paşa Stadı; Referee: Necmi Temizel

20 November 1983 12	Galatasaray SK	2–2	Trabzonspor	Istanbul
15:00 EET	Raşit Çetiner 43'; Mustafa Ergücü 78' (pen.)	(Report)	Tuncay Soyak 28', 41'	Stadium: Ali Sami Yen Stadı; Attendance: 36,658; Referee: Talat Tokat

27 November 1983 13	Beşiktaş JK	2–1	Galatasaray SK	Istanbul
15:00 EET	Ziya Doğan 3'; Zlatan Arnautović 58'	(Report)	Raşit Çetiner 15'	Stadium: Fenerbahçe Stadı; Attendance: 33,434; Referee: Özcan Oal

4 December 1983 14	Boluspor	0–0	Galatasaray SK	Bolu
14:00 EET		(Report)		Stadium: Atatürk Stadı; Referee: Talat Tokat

10 December 1983 15	Galatasaray SK	9–2	Adana Demirspor	Istanbul
14:00 EET	Fatih Zambak 4' (o.g.); Mustafa Denizli 23'; Ahmet Keloğlu 39', 56'; Mirsad Sejdić 44', 76'; Tarik Hodžić 49' (pen.), 59'; Metin Yıldız 85'	(Report)	Müjdat Karanfilci 40'; Orhan Uçak 78' (pen.)	Stadium: Ali Sami Yen Stadı; Attendance: 19,356; Referee: Coşkun Kutay

18 December 1983 16	Sarıyer G.K.	0–1	Galatasaray SK	Istanbul
14:00 EET		(Report)	Cüneyt Tanman 13'	Stadium: Fenerbahçe Stadı; Attendance: 30,737; Referee: Aykan Köseoğlu

25 December 1983 17	Sakaryaspor	1–3	Galatasaray SK	Adapazarı
14:00 EET	Tuna Güneysu 33'	(Report)	Mustafa Ergücü 25', 67'; Sinan Turhan 28'	Stadium: Sakarya Atatürk Stadı; Referee: İbrahim Acar

29 January 1984 18	Galatasaray SK	3–2	Fatih Karagümrük SK	Istanbul
14:00 EET	Ali Çoban 51'; Tarik Hodžić 58', 77'	(Report)	Ömer Kaner 46'; Rıza Tuyuran 87'	Stadium: Ali Sami Yen Stadı; Referee: Haşim Gökalp

5 February 1984 19	Adanaspor	1–2	Galatasaray SK	Adana
14:00 EET	Kayhan Kaynak 77'	(Report)	Mustafa Ergücü 59'; Cüneyt Tanman 71'	Stadium: Adana 5 Ocak Stadium; Referee: İbrahim Acar

11 February 1984 20	Galatasaray SK	1–1	MKE Ankaragücü	Istanbul
14:00 EET	Mustafa Ergücü 52'	(Report)	Sadık Aksöz 85'	Stadium: Ali Sami Yen Stadı; Attendance: 21,883; Referee: Necmi Temizel

19 February 1984 21	Denizlispor	2–1	Galatasaray SK	Denizli
14:00 EET	Altan Çetindağ 26'; Zafer Dinçer 34'	(Report)	Adnan Esen 65'	Stadium: Atatürk Stadı; Referee: İlyas Ayan

26 February 1984 22	Galatasaray SK	1–0	Zonguldakspor	Istanbul
14:00 EET	Rauf Kılıç 13'	(Report)		Stadium: Ali Sami Yen Stadı; Attendance: 30,076; Referee: Talat Tokat

18 March 1984 23	Antalyaspor	1–1	Galatasaray SK	Antalya
15:00 EET	Mehmet Akdülger 4'	(Report)	Mirsad Sejdić 12'	Stadium: Atatürk Stadı; Referee: Coşkun Kutay

21 March 1984 24	Bursaspor	0–0	Galatasaray SK	Bursa
15:00 EET		(Report)		Stadium: Atatürk Stadı; Referee: Necmi Temizel

24 March 1984 25	Galatasaray SK	3–0	Gençlerbirliği SK	Istanbul
15:00 EET	Tarik Hodžić 15', 62'; Mirsad Sejdić 69'	(Report)		Stadium: İnönü Stadı; Attendance: 25,000; Referee: Hasan Ceylan

31 March 1984 26	Orduspor	3–0	Galatasaray SK	Ordu
14:30 EET	Güven Türközer 49'; Bedri Taner 59'; Yücel Uyar 63'	(Report)		Stadium: 19 Eylül Stadı; Referee: İbrahim Acar

8 April 1984 27	Galatasaray SK	1–1	Fenerbahçe SK	Istanbul
15:00 EET	Mirsad Sejdić 1'	(Report)	Suad Karalić 73'	Stadium: Ali Sami Yen Stadı; Attendance: 30,490; Referee: Yusuf Namoğlu

15 April 1984 28	Galatasaray SK	2–1	Kocaelispor	Istanbul
15:00 EET	Bülent Alkılıç 64'; Raşit Çetiner 73'	(Report)	Yaşar Altıntaş 63'	Stadium: Ali Sami Yen Stadı; Attendance: 15,194; Referee: Yavuz Karaozan

22 April 1984 29	Trabzonspor	1–0	Galatasaray SK	Trabzon
14:00 EET	Kemal Serdar 24'	(Report)		Stadium: Hüseyin Avni Aker Stadium; Referee: İbrahim Acar

29 April 1984 30	Galatasaray SK	0–1	Beşiktaş JK	Istanbul
15:00 EET		(Report)	Necdet Ergün 82'	Stadium: Ali Sami Yen Stadı; Attendance: 17,369; Referee: Özcan Oal

5 May 1984 31	Galatasaray SK	1–0	Boluspor	Istanbul
15:00 EET	Tarik Hodžić 42' (pen.)	(Report)		Stadium: İnönü Stadı; Attendance: 11,008; Referee: İlyas Ayan

13 May 1983 32	Adana Demirspor	0–1	Galatasaray SK	Adana
15:00 EET		(Report)	Bülent Alkılıç 55'	Stadium: Adana 5 Ocak Stadium; Referee: Kazım Ünlüsoy

20 May 1984 33	Galatasaray SK	0–1	Sarıyer G.K.	Istanbul
15:00 EET		(Report)	Sead Čelebić 7'	Stadium: Ali Sami Yen Stadı; Attendance: 10,791; Referee: Yahya Diker

26 May 1984 34	Galatasaray SK	1–1	Sakaryaspor	Istanbul
15:00 EET	Tarik Hodžić 53' (pen.)	(Report)	Aykut Yiğit 83'	Stadium: Ali Sami Yen Stadı; Attendance: 7,243; Referee: İbrahim Acar

== Türkiye Kupası ==
Kick-off listed in local time (EET)

=== 5th Round ===
22 February 1984 1	Eskişehirspor	2–1	Galatasaray SK	Eskişehir
14:00 EET	Zafer Tüzün 45', 86' (pen.)	(Report)	Ahmet Keloğlu 63'	Stadium: Eskişehir Atatürk Stadı; Referee: Oğuz Sarvan

14 March 1984 2	Galatasaray SK	3–1	Eskişehirspor	Istanbul
15:00 EET	Cüneyt Tanman 15'; Raşit Çetiner 55'; Mustafa Denizli 56'	(Report)	Zafer Tüzün 34'	Stadium: Ali Sami Yen Stadı; Referee: Ali İhsan Papatya

=== 6th Round ===
28 March 1984 1	Altınordu S.K.	2–2	Galatasaray SK	İzmir
14:00 EET	Metin Gökalp 51'; Raci Şengün 54' (pen.)	(Report)	Mustafa Ergücü 8'; Cüneyt Tanman 32'	Stadium: Atatürk Stadı; Referee: Fikri Kuşdemir

12 April 1984 2	Galatasaray SK	1–1	Altınordu S.K.	Istanbul
15:00 EET	Mustafa Denizli 16'	(Report)	Ali Albaş 87'	Stadium: Ali Sami Yen Stadı; Attendance: 6,805; Referee: Coşkun Kutay

=== 1/4 Final ===
18 April 1984 1	Galatasaray SK	2–1	Karşıyaka SK	Istanbul
15:00 EET	Tarik Hodžić 14'; Ahmet Ceyhan 73'	(Report)	Adnan Canker 3'	Stadium: Ali Sami Yen Stadı; Attendance: 9,956; Referee: İlyas Ayan

25 April 1984 2	Karşıyaka SK	1–0	Galatasaray SK	İzmir
15:00 EET	Zeki Yalçınkaya 87'	(Report)		Stadium: Atatürk Stadı; Attendance: 7,996; Referee: Talat Tokat

== Friendly Matches ==
Kick-off listed in local time (EET)

=== TSYD Kupası ===
13 August 1983 1	Fenerbahçe SK	1–1	Galatasaray SK	Istanbul
17:00 EET	Selçuk Yula 85'	(Report)	Tarik Hodžić 58'	Stadium: Fenerbahçe Stadı; Attendance: 17,689; Referee: Haşim Gökalp

17 August 1983 2	Galatasaray SK	1–3	Beşiktaş JK	Istanbul
18:00 EET	Birol Yalçın 75'	(Report)	Ziya Doğan 40', 51'; Fikret Demirer 60'	Stadium: Ali Sami Yen Stadı; Referee: Yahya Diker

=== Donanma Kupası ===
14 January 1984 1	Galatasaray SK	2–1	Beşiktaş JK	Istanbul
14:00 EET	Cüneyt Tanman 44', 52'	(Report)	Feyyaz Uçar 20'	Stadium: Fenerbahçe Stadı; Attendance: 8,000; Referee: Kemal Bayram

15 January 1984 2	Fatih Karagümrük SK	2–1	Galatasaray SK	Istanbul
12:00 EET	Ali Çoban 27' (o.g.); Rıza Tuyuran 56'	(Report)	Mustafa Ergücü 42' (pen.)	Stadium: Fenerbahçe Stadı; Referee: Yüksel Okçuoğlu

22 January 1984 3	Galatasaray SK	1–1	Fenerbahçe SK	Istanbul
14:00 EET	Erdoğan Arıca 90' (o.g.)	(Report)	Engin Verel 24'	Stadium: Fenerbahçe Stadı; Attendance: 19,653; Referee: İlker Zümrüt

== Attendance ==
Competition	Av. Att.	Total Att.
1. Lig	26,274	446,665
Türkiye Kupası	10,587	31,761
Total	23,921	478,426
