= 1982–83 Galatasaray S.K. season =

Galatasaray
1982–83 season
- President: (Turkey) Ali Uras
- Manager: (Turkey) Özkan Sümer (until 5 June 1983) (Turkey) Günay Kayarlar (Interim)
- Stadium: Ali Sami Yen Stadı
- 1. Lig: 3rd
- Türkiye Kupası: 6th Round
- Cup Winners' Cup: 2nd Round
- Top goalscorer: League: Mirsad Sejdić (13); All: Mirsad Sejdić (16)
- Highest home attendance: 35,503 vs Fenerbahçe SK (1. Lig, 5 June 1982)
- Lowest home attendance: 13,402 vs Gaziantepspor (1. Lig, 4 December 1982)
- Average home league attendance: 26,575
Home colours	Away colours

The 1982–83 season was Galatasaray's 79th in existence and the 25th consecutive season in the 1. Lig. This article shows statistics of the club's players in the season, and also lists all matches that the club have played in the season.

== Squad statistics ==
No.	Pos.	Name	1. Lig		Türkiye Kupası		ECW		Total	
No.	Pos.	Name	Apps	Goals	Apps	Goals	Apps	Goals	Apps	Goals
-	GK	(Turkey) Eser Özaltındere	28	0	2	0	4	0	34	0
-	GK	(Turkey) Haydar Erdoğan	6	0	0	0	0	0	6	0
-	DF	(Turkey) Fatih Terim (C)	29	1	2	0	4	0	35	1
-	DF	(Turkey) Rauf Kılıç	5	1	0	0	0	0	5	1
-	DF	(Turkey) Cüneyt Tanman	16	0	2	0	0	0	18	0
-	DF	(Turkey) Ahmet Ceyhan	21	0	2	0	0	0	23	0
-	DF	(Turkey) Ömer Sağlam	4	0	0	0	0	0	4	0
-	DF	(Turkey) Fettah Dindar	11	0	1	0	1	0	13	0
-	DF	(Turkey) Müfit Erkasap	0	0	0	0	0	0	0	0
-	DF	(Turkey) Halil İbrahim Akçay	7	0	1	0	2	0	10	0
-	DF	(Turkey) Raşit Çetiner	34	5	2	0	4	1	40	6
-	DF	(Turkey) Ali Çoban	18	0	1	0	0	0	19	0
-	DF	(Turkey) Adnan Aydın	1	0	0	0	0	0	1	0
-	DF	(Turkey) Sefer Karaer	3	0	0	0	1	0	4	0
-	DF	(Turkey) İbrahim Sokullu	3	0	1	0	0	0	4	0
-	DF	(Turkey) Murat İnan	4	0	0	0	1	0	5	0
-	MF	(Turkey) Adnan Esen	16	0	0	0	4	0	20	0
-	MF	(Turkey) Orhan Akyüz	0	0	0	0	0	0	0	0
-	MF	(Turkey) Ahmet Keloğlu	21	0	0	0	3	0	24	0
-	MF	(Turkey) Bahattin Saykaloğlu	2	0	2	0	0	0	4	0
-	MF	(Turkey) Mustafa Ergücü	30	5	0	0	4	2	34	7
-	MF	(Turkey) Cengiz Yazıcıoğlu	12	0	0	0	2	0	14	0
-	MF	(Turkey) Metin Yıldız	1	0	0	0	0	0	1	0
-	MF	(Turkey) Mustafa Turgat	3	0	1	0	0	0	4	0
-	FW	(Turkey) Öner Kılıç	17	2	1	0	1	0	19	2
-	FW	(Turkey) Bülent Alkılıç	26	3	0	0	4	0	30	3
-	FW	(Turkey) Metin Çekiçler	0	0	0	0	0	0	0	0
-	FW	(Turkey) Ali Hamurcuoğlu	4	0	0	0	2	0	6	0
-	FW	(Turkey) Birol Yalçın	12	2	2	1	0	0	14	3
-	FW	(Turkey) Sinan Turhan	31	8	2	0	4	0	37	8
-	FW	(Socialist Federal Republic of Yugoslavia) Tarik Hodžić	26	10	1	0	3	1	30	11
-	FW	(Socialist Federal Republic of Yugoslavia) Mirsad Sejdić	26	13	2	1	3	2	31	16

=== Players in / out ===
==== In ====
Pos.	Nat.	Name	Age	Moving from
MF	(Turkey)	Ahmet Keloğlu	20	ADO Den Haag
DF	(Turkey)	Ahmet Ceyhan	31	Trabzonspor
MF	(Turkey)	Adnan Esen	21	Zonguldakspor

==== Out ====
Pos.	Nat.	Name	Age	Moving to
MF	(Turkey)	Ayhan Akbin	27	Kocaelispor

== 1. Lig ==
=== Standings ===
Pos	Team	Pld	W	D	L	GF	GA	GD	Pts	Qualification or relegation
1	Fenerbahçe (C)	34	18	13	3	43	20	+23	49	Qualification to European Cup first round
2	Trabzonspor	34	17	13	4	40	19	+21	47	Qualification to UEFA Cup first round
3	Galatasaray	34	17	10	7	50	33	+17	44	Invitation to Balkans Cup
4	Boluspor	34	16	9	9	39	23	+16	41	
5	Beşiktaş	34	16	7	11	49	30	+19	39	

Rules for classification: 1) points; 2) goal difference; 3) number of goals scored.
(C) Champions

=== Matches ===
Kick-off listed in local time (EET)

28 August 1982 1	Galatasaray SK	1–0	Mersin İdman Yurdu	Istanbul
17:30 EET	Mirsad Sejdić 18'	(Report)		Stadium: Ali Sami Yen Stadı; Attendance: 27,988; Referee: Talat Tokat

12 September 1982 2	Sakaryaspor	1–0	Galatasaray SK	Adapazarı
15:30 EET	Ceyhun Güray 26'	(Report)		Stadium: Sakarya Atatürk Stadı; Attendance: 15,000; Referee: İhsan Türe

18 September 1982 3	Sarıyer G.K.	1–2	Galatasaray SK	Istanbul
15:30 EET	Rıfkı Soysal 61'	(Report)	Bülent Alkılıç 56', 74'	Stadium: Ali Sami Yen Stadı; Attendance: 21,669; Referee: Yahya Diker

26 September 1982 4	Galatasaray SK	2–0	Antalyaspor	Istanbul
17:30 EET	Sinan Turhan 40', 65'	(Report)		Stadium: Ali Sami Yen Stadı; Attendance: 26,827; Referee: Yavuz Tunç

3 October 1982 5	Zonguldakspor	1–2	Galatasaray SK	Zonguldak
15:30 EET	Ümit Kandemir 9'	(Report)	Tarik Hodžić 23'; Mustafa Ergücü 40'	Stadium: Kemal Köksal Stadium; Referee: Sadık Deda

9 October 1982 6	Galatasaray SK	2–0	Boluspor	Istanbul
15:30 EET	Öner Kılıç 2', 21'	(Report)		Stadium: Ali Sami Yen Stadı; Attendance: 32,299; Referee: Talat Tokat

17 October 1982 7	Galatasaray SK	2–1	Bursaspor	Istanbul
15:30 EET	Fatih Terim 49'; Tarik Hodžić 70'	(Report)	Mücellip Pehlivan 38'	Stadium: Ali Sami Yen Stadı; Attendance: 32,254; Referee: İbrahim Acar

24 October 1982 8	Galatasaray SK	0–0	Trabzonspor	Istanbul
15:15 EET		(Report)		Stadium: Ali Sami Yen Stadı; Attendance: 35,146; Referee: İbrahim Acar

30 October 1982 9	Galatasaray SK	1–1	Beşiktaş JK	Istanbul
15:15 EET	Tarik Hodžić 57'	(Report)	Necdet Ergün 12'	Stadium: Ali Sami Yen Stadı; Attendance: 29,792; Referee: Yusuf Namoğlu

21 November 1982 10	Galatasaray SK	4–1	Samsunspor	Istanbul
15:00 EET	Mirsad Sejdić 24'; Sinan Turhan 36'; Mustafa Ergücü 40', 54' (pen.)	(Report)	Tanju Çolak 70'	Stadium: Ali Sami Yen Stadı; Attendance: 23,662; Referee: Halil Atalık

28 November 1982 11	MKE Ankaragücü	0–0	Galatasaray SK	Ankara
14:00 EET		(Report)		Stadium: Ankara 19 Mayıs Stadium; Attendance: 20,437; Referee: İlyas Ayan

4 December 1982 12	Galatasaray SK	1–0	Gaziantepspor	Istanbul
14:00 EET	Mirsad Sejdić 59'	(Report)		Stadium: Fenerbahçe Stadı; Attendance: 13,402; Referee: Yavuz Tunç

12 December 1982 13	Altay SK	1–1	Galatasaray SK	İzmir
14:00 EET	Şeref Onarlıoğlu 69'	(Report)	Tarik Hodžić 75'	Stadium: İzmir Atatürk Stadium; Attendance: 24,421; Referee: Coşkun Kutay

18 December 1982 14	Galatasaray SK	1–0	Adana Demirspor	Istanbul
14:00 EET	Sinan Turhan 31'	(Report)		Stadium: Ali Sami Yen Stadı; Attendance: 26,878; Referee: Necmi Temizel

26 December 1982 15	Fenerbahçe SK	1–0	Galatasaray SK	Istanbul
14:00 EET	Selçuk Yula 6'	(Report)		Stadium: Fenerbahçe Stadı; Attendance: 30,699; Referee: Cumhur Demir

2 January 1983 16	Kocaelispor	1–1	Galatasaray SK	İzmit
14:00 EET	Senad Ibric 41'	(Report)	Raşit Çetiner 86'	Stadium: İsmet Paşa Stadı; Attendance: 10,000; Referee: Talat Tokat

8 January 1983 17	Galatasaray SK	1–0	Adanaspor	Istanbul
14:00 EET	Raşit Çetiner 31'	(Report)		Stadium: Ali Sami Yen Stadı; Attendance: 24,458; Referee: Halil Atalık

20 February 1983 18	Mersin İdman Yurdu	2–0	Galatasaray SK	Mersin
14:00 EET	Sertaç Yüzbaş 33'; Memik Ertanıroğlu 75'	(Report)		Stadium: Tevfik Sırrı Gür Stadı; Referee: Erdoğdu Diyadin

6 March 1983 19	Galatasaray SK	1–1	Sarıyer G.K.	Istanbul
15:00 EET	Raşit Çetiner 31'	(Report)	Sead Čelebić 47'	Stadium: Ali Sami Yen Stadı; Attendance: 22,405; Referee: Yusuf Namoğlu

13 March 1983 20	Antalyaspor	0–1	Galatasaray SK	Antalya
14:00 EET		(Report)	Mirsad Sejdić 16'	Stadium: Atatürk Stadı; Referee: Necmi Temizel

19 March 1983 21	Galatasaray SK	2–1	Zonguldakspor	Istanbul
15:00 EET	Mirsad Sejdić 12', 65'	(Report)	Metin Yıldız 5'	Stadium: Ali Sami Yen Stadı; Attendance: 27,928; Referee: İlyas Ayan

26 March 1983 22	Boluspor	0–1	Galatasaray SK	Bolu
14:00 EET		(Report)	Tarik Hodžić 53'	Stadium: Atatürk Stadı; Referee: Coşkun Evin

3 April 1983 23	Bursaspor	1–1	Galatasaray SK	Bursa
15:00 EET	Muzaffer Atacan 2'	(Report)	Birol Yalçın 7'	Stadium: Atatürk Stadı; Referee: İlyas Ayan

10 April 1982 24	Trabzonspor	2–0	Galatasaray SK	Trabzon
15:00 EET	Bahaddin Güneş 59' (pen.); İskender Günen 76'	(Report)		Stadium: Hüseyin Avni Aker Stadium; Attendance: 22,500; Referee: Sadık Deda

17 April 1983 25	Beşiktaş JK	0–1	Galatasaray SK	Istanbul
15:00 EET		(Report)	Sinan Turhan 21'	Stadium: Fenerbahçe Stadı; Attendance: 20,018; Referee: Özer Kızıltan

27 April 1983 26	Samsunspor	1–1	Galatasaray SK	Samsun
15:00 EET	Murat Şimşek 53'	(Report)	Mirsad Sejdić 36'	Stadium: 19 Mayıs Stadı; Referee: İbrahim Acar

30 April 1983 27	Galatasaray SK	5–1	Sakaryaspor	Istanbul
15:00 EET	Sinan Turhan 4'; Mirsad Sejdić 40', 60'; Tarik Hodžić 44'; Rauf Kılıç 87'	(Report)	Ahmet Kılıç 31'	Stadium: Ali Sami Yen Stadı; Attendance: 23,217; Referee: Talat Tokat

8 May 1983 28	Galatasaray SK	2–2	MKE Ankaragücü	Istanbul
16:00 EET	Mirsad Sejdić 25' (pen.); Sinan Turhan 55'	(Report)	Sadık Aksöz 14'; Halil İbrahim Eren 75' (pen.)	Stadium: Ali Sami Yen Stadı; Attendance: 35,394; Referee: Sadık Deda

15 May 1983 29	Gaziantepspor	2–1	Galatasaray SK	Gaziantep
16:00 EET	Davut Koç 40'; Hüseyin Çakıroğlu 71' (pen.)	(Report)	Tarik Hodžić 10'	Stadium: Kamil Ocak Stadı; Referee: Halil Atalık

21 May 1983 30	Galatasaray SK	6–2	Altay	Istanbul
16:00 EET	Mirsad Sejdić 12', 78'; Tarik Hodžić 14'; Raşit Çetiner 41'; Mustafa Ergücü 84'; Birol Yalçın 86'	(Report)	Erdi Demir 3'; Mustafa Denizli 74'	Stadium: Ali Sami Yen Stadı; Attendance: 17,585; Referee: İbrahim Acar

29 May 1983 31	Adana Demirspor	3–0	Galatasaray SK	Adana
16:00 EET	Adnan Dürüst 64'; Tekin İncebaldır 76'; Orhan Uçak 84'	(Report)		Stadium: Adana 5 Ocak Stadium; Referee: Talat Tokat

5 June 1983 32	Galatasaray SK	4–4	Fenerbahçe SK	Istanbul
16:00 EET	Mirsad Sejdić 10'; Bülent Alkılıç 16'; Sinan Turhan 29'; Tarik Hodžić 48'	(Report)	Özcan Kızıltan 14', 67'; Onur Kayador 59'; Mehmet Hacıoğlu 71'	Stadium: Ali Sami Yen Stadı; Attendance: 35,503; Referee: Yusuf Namoğlu

12 June 1983 33	Galatasaray SK	2–0	Kocaelispor	Istanbul
16:00 EET	Mustafa Ergücü 57' (pen.); Raşit Çetiner 72'	(Report)		Stadium: Ali Sami Yen Stadı; Attendance: 17,045; Referee: İlyas Ayan

19 June 1983 34	Adanaspor	2–1	Galatasaray SK	Adana
16:00 EET	Feyzullah Küçük 11'; İsmail Akbaşlı 35'	(Report)	Tarik Hodžić 26'	Stadium: Adana 5 Ocak Stadium; Referee: Ahmet Akçay

== Türkiye Kupası ==
Kick-off listed in local time (EET)

=== 6th Round ===
23 March 1983 1	Galatasaray SK	1–2	Trabzonspor	Istanbul
15:00 EET	Birol Yalçın 61'	(Report)	Şenol Ustaömer 40'; İskender Günen 60'	Stadium: Ali Sami Yen Stadı; Attendance: 25,067; Referee: Talat Tokat

6 April 1983 2	Trabzonspor	1–1	Galatasaray SK	Trabzon
14:00 EET	İskender Günen 56'	(Report)	Mirsad Sejdić 50'	Stadium: Hüseyin Avni Aker Stadium; Attendance: 4,953; Referee: İhsan Türe

== European Cup Winners' Cup ==
=== 1st round ===
15 September 1982 1	Galatasaray SK	2–1	FC Lahti	Istanbul
	Raşit Çetiner 21'; Mustafa Ergücü 29'	(Report)	Juha Annunen 23'	Stadium: Ali Sami Yen Stadı; Attendance: 24,910; Referee: (Albania) Hiqmet Kuka

29 September 1982 2	FC Lahti	1–1	Galatasaray SK	Lahti
	Jorma Kallio 89'	(Report)	Tarik Hodžić 87'	Stadium: Lahden Stadion; Referee: (Sweden) Kjell Johansson

=== 2nd round ===
20 October 1982 1	Galatasaray SK	2–4	FK Austria Wien	Istanbul
	Mirsad Sejdić 19', 34'	(Report)	Gerhard Steinkogler 43'; Toni Polster 53', 74'; Felix Gasselich 77'	Stadium: Ali Sami Yen Stadı; Attendance: 34,689; Referee: (Italy) Paolo Bergamo

3 November 1982 2	FK Austria Wien	0–1	Galatasaray SK	Wien
		(Report)	Mustafa Ergücü 63'	Stadium: Franz Horr Stadium; Referee: (Romania) Nicolae Rainea

== Friendly Matches ==
Kick-off listed in local time (EET)

=== TSYD Kupası ===
18 August 1982 1	Beşiktaş JK	0–0	Galatasaray SK	Istanbul
18:00 EET		(Report)		Stadium: İnönü Stadı; Attendance: 23,480; Referee: Özer Kızıltan

22 August 1982 2	Galatasaray SK	1–2	Fenerbahçe SK	Istanbul
18:00 EET	Fatih Terim 85'	(Report)	Muhamed Ibrahimbegovic 10'; Selçuk Yula 51'	Stadium: İnönü Stadı; Attendance: 34,053; Referee: Yalçın Darıcı

=== Donanma Kupası ===
2 February 1983 1	Galatasaray SK	2–2	Beşiktaş JK	Istanbul
12:00 EET	Bülent Alkılıç 11', 74'	(Report)	Metin Tekin 72', 76'	Stadium: İnönü Stadı; Attendance: 15,000; Referee: Aykan Köseoğlu

5 February 1983 2	Galatasaray SK	2–0	Sarıyer G.K.	Istanbul
12:00 EET	Bülent Alkılıç 57'; Öner Kılıç 87'	(Report)		Stadium: İnönü Stadı; Attendance: 35,000; Referee: Kemal Cevlan

6 February 1983 3	Fenerbahçe SK	1–1	Galatasaray SK	Istanbul
14:00 EET	Mehmet Hacıoğlu 60'	(Report)	Tarik Hodžić 5'	Stadium: İnönü Stadı; Attendance: 23,693; Referee: Halil Tankut

=== Akıl Hastalar Vakfı tournament ===
13 November 1982 1/2 Final	Galatasaray SK	2–1	Sarıyer G.K.	Istanbul
	Sinan Turhan 7'; Tarik Hodžić 51'		Smail Spahio 71' (pen.)	Stadium: İnönü Stadı; Referee: Halit Tankut

14 November 1982 Final	Beşiktaş JK	1–1	Galatasaray SK	Istanbul
13:00	Sadullah Acele 67'		Tarik Hodžić 82'	Stadium: İnönü Stadı; Attendance: 11,000; Referee: Yahya Diker

== Attendance ==
Competition	Av. Att.	Total Att.
1. Lig	26,575	451,783
Türkiye Kupası	25,067	25,067
Cup Winners' Cup	29,800	59,599
Total	26,822	536,449
