= 1981–82 Galatasaray S.K. season =

Galatasaray
1981–82 season
- President: (Turkey) Ali Uras
- Manager: (England) Brian Birch (until 21 November 1981) (Turkey) Günay Kayarlar (Interim) (until 6 December 1981) (Turkey) Özkan Sümer
- Stadium: Inönü Stadi
- 1. Lig: 11th
- Türkiye Kupası: Winner
- Süper Kupa: Winner
- Top goalscorer: League: Ayhan Akbin (5); Metin Yıldız (5); All: Ayhan Akbin (8); Tarik Hodžić (8)
- Highest home attendance: 40,009 vs Beşiktaş JK (1. Lig, 19 September 1981)
- Lowest home attendance: 4,139 vs Antalyaspor (Türkiye Kupası, 17 March 1981)
- Average home league attendance: 25,913
Home colours	Away colours	Third colours

The 1981–82 season was Galatasaray's 78th in existence and the 24th consecutive season in the 1. Lig. This article shows statistics of the club's players in the season, and also lists all matches that the club have played in the season.

== Squad statistics ==
No.	Pos.	Name	1. Lig		Türkiye Kupası		Süper Kupa		Total	
No.	Pos.	Name	Apps	Goals	Apps	Goals	Apps	Goals	Apps	Goals
-	GK	(Turkey) Eser Özaltındere	16	0	8	0	1	0	25	0
-	GK	(Turkey) Haydar Erdoğan	17	0	2	0	0	0	19	0
-	DF	(Turkey) Fatih Terim (C)	28	0	9	1	1	0	38	1
-	DF	(Turkey) Cüneyt Tanman	24	2	8	1	0	0	32	3
-	DF	(Turkey) Fettah Dindar	21	0	5	0	1	0	27	0
-	DF	(Turkey) Müfit Erkasap	5	0	0	0	0	0	5	0
-	DF	(Turkey) Tufan	5	0	3	0	0	0	8	0
-	DF	(Turkey) Raşit Çetiner	28	4	9	1	1	0	38	5
-	DF	(Turkey) Ali Çoban	27	1	9	0	0	0	36	1
-	DF	(Turkey) Sefer Karaer	32	0	10	0	1	0	43	0
-	DF	(Turkey) Murat İnan	9	0	3	0	0	0	12	0
-	MF	(Turkey) Orhan Akyüz	1	0	0	0	0	0	1	0
-	MF	(Turkey) Bahattin Saykaloğlu	3	1	0	0	0	0	3	1
-	MF	(Turkey) Ahmet Genç	10	0	1	0	0	0	11	0
-	MF	(Turkey) Mustafa Ergücü	21	0	3	0	0	0	24	0
-	MF	(Turkey) Cengiz Yazıcıoğlu	26	0	5	0	1	0	32	0
-	MF	(Turkey) Metin Yıldız	17	5	6	2	0	0	23	7
-	MF	(Turkey) Candemir Yılmam	1	0	0	0	0	0	1	0
-	MF	(Turkey) Mustafa Turgat	17	0	8	1	1	0	26	1
-	MF	(Turkey) Hasan Moralı	2	0	1	0	0	0	3	0
-	FW	(Turkey) Öner Kılıç	2	0	0	0	0	0	2	0
-	FW	(Turkey) Bülent Alkılıç	25	0	10	1	1	0	36	1
-	FW	(Turkey) Metin Çekiçler	8	0	0	0	0	0	8	0
-	FW	(Turkey) Vefa Yamanoğlu	1	0	1	0	0	0	2	0
-	FW	(Turkey) Ayhan Akbin	23	5	9	3	0	0	29	8
-	FW	(Turkey) Sinan Turhan	14	4	6	1	0	0	20	5
-	FW	(Socialist Federal Republic of Yugoslavia) Tarik Hodžić	9	2	6	5	1	1	16	8
-	FW	(Socialist Federal Republic of Yugoslavia) Mirsad Sejdić	4	1	1	0	1	1	6	2

=== Players in / out ===
==== In ====
Pos.	Nat.	Name	Age	Moving from
FW	(Turkey)	Ayhan Akbin	26	Zonguldakspor
FW	(Turkey)	Sinan Turhan	26	Çaykur Rizespor
DF	(Turkey)	Raşit Çetiner	25	Fenerbahçe
FW	(Socialist Federal Republic of Yugoslavia)	Tarik Hodžić	30	RFC de Liège
FW	(Turkey)	Mustafa Turgat	25	Altay SK
DF	(Turkey)	Sefer Karaer	25	Kayserispor

==== Out ====
Pos.	Nat.	Name	Age	Moving to
FW	(Turkey)	Erdoğan Arıca	27	Fenerbahçe
DF	(Turkey)	Orhan Akyüz	27	Kocaelispor
MF	(Turkey)	Turgay İnal	23	Sakaryaspor
FW	(Turkey)	Mehmet Reşit Güner	28	Diyarbakırspor
FW	(Turkey)	Mehmet Özgül	31	Bursaspor

== 1. Lig ==
=== Standings ===
Pos	Team	Pld	W	D	L	GF	GA	GD	Pts	Qualification or relegation
9	Altay	32	8	16	8	37	27	+10	32	
10	Kocaelispor	32	10	12	10	36	31	+5	32	
11	Galatasaray	32	10	12	10	26	26	0	32	Qualification to Cup Winners' Cup first round
12	Boluspor	32	7	17	8	24	24	0	31	
13	Bursaspor	32	11	9	12	25	26	−1	31	

Rules for classification: 1) points; 2) goal difference; 3) number of goals scored.

=== Matches ===
Kick-off listed in local time (EET)

5 September 1981 1	Adana Demirspor	1–3	Galatasaray SK	Adana
20:30 EET	Hasan Eryiğit 40'	(Report)	Raşit Çetiner 8', 73'; Ali Çoban 25'	Stadium: Adana 5 Ocak Stadium; Attendance: 16,437; Referee: İhsan Türe

13 September 1981 2	Galatasaray SK	2–1	Boluspor	Istanbul
16:30 EET	Cüneyt Tanman 42'; Sinan Turhan 67'	(Report)	Rıdvan Dilmen 63'	Stadium: Ali Sami Yen Stadı; Attendance: 35,629; Referee: Coşkun Kutay

19 September 1981 3	Galatasaray SK	1–1	Beşiktaş JK	Istanbul
16:30 EET	Sinan Turhan 63'	(Report)	Süleyman Oktay 71'	Stadium: İnönü Stadı; Attendance: 40,000; Referee: Cumhur Demir

27 September 1981 4	Eskişehirspor	0–1	Galatasaray SK	Eskişehir
15:30 EET		(Report)	Sinan Turhan 73'	Stadium: Eskişehir Atatürk Stadı; Referee: Talat Tokat

18 October 1981 5	Fenerbahçe SK	1–0	Galatasaray SK	Istanbul
15:30 EET	Osman Denizci 76'	(Report)		Stadium: İnönü Stadı; Attendance: 33,548; Referee: Yusuf Namoğlu

25 October 1981 6	Galatasaray SK	0–0	Trabzonspor	Istanbul
15:30 EET		(Report)		Stadium: Ali Sami Yen Stadı; Attendance: 35,791; Referee: Talat Tokat

1 November 1981 7	Sakaryaspor	1–0	Galatasaray SK	Adapazarı
15:30 EET	Aykut Yiğit 37'	(Report)		Stadium: Sakarya Atatürk Stadı; Attendance: 16,000; Referee: Coşkun Kutay

8 November 1981 8	Kocaelispor	0–1	Galatasaray SK	İzmit
14:45 EET		(Report)	Ayhan Akbin 49'	Stadium: İsmet Paşa Stadı; Referee: Yılmaz Önen

14 November 1981 9	Galatasaray SK	0–0	Adanaspor	Istanbul
14:45 EET		(Report)		Stadium: İnönü Stadı; Attendance: 26,678; Referee: Coşkun Evin

21 November 1981 10	Galatasaray SK	0–1	Bursaspor	Istanbul
14:45 EET		(Report)	Altan Güney 25'	Stadium: İnönü Stadı; Attendance: 26,789; Referee: Yalçın Gümüşkaya

29 November 1981 11	Gaziantepspor	0–1	Galatasaray SK	Gaziantep
14:15 EET		(Report)	Metin Yıldız 30'	Stadium: Kamil Ocak Stadı; Attendance: 15,000; Referee: İhsan Türe

6 December 1981 12	Galatasaray SK	0–0	MKE Ankaragücü	Istanbul
14:00 EET		(Report)		Stadium: Ali Sami Yen Stadı; Attendance: 19,768; Referee: Hamza Alan

13 December 1981 13	Altay SK	0–0	Galatasaray SK	İzmir
14:00 EET		(Report)		Stadium: İzmir Atatürk Stadium; Referee: Nihat Gülşen

19 December 1981 14	Galatasaray SK	2–2	Zonguldakspor	Istanbul
14:00 EET	Raşit Çetiner 19', 49'	(Report)	Muzaffer Badalıoğlu 39'; Volkan Yayın 46'	Stadium: İnönü Stadı; Referee: İhsan Türe

27 December 1981 15	Diyarbakırspor	1–2	Galatasaray SK	Diyarbakır
13:45 EET	Fettah Dindar 14' (o.g.)	(Report)	Ayhan Akbin 30', 62'	Stadium: Diyarbakır Atatürk Stadi; Referee: Erdoğdu Diyadin

2 January 1982 16	Galatasaray SK	1–0	Göztepe S.K.	Istanbul
14:00 EET	Cüneyt Tanman 59'	(Report)		Stadium: İnönü Stadı; Attendance: 39,035; Referee: Ali İhsan Papatya

21 February 1982 17	Galatasaray SK	0–0	Adana Demirspor	Istanbul
14:30 EET		(Report)		Stadium: İnönü Stadı; Attendance: 25,000; Referee: Selahattin Salar

28 February 1982 18	Boluspor	1–1	Galatasaray SK	Bolu
14:15 EET	Kenan Öz 50'	(Report)	Metin Yıldız 34'	Stadium: Bolu Atatürk Stadi; Referee: Coşkun Evin

7 March 1982 19	Beşiktaş JK	2–0	Galatasaray SK	Istanbul
15:30 EET	Ali Kemal Denizci 11'; Necdet Ergün 83'	(Report)		Stadium: İnönü Stadı; Attendance: 19,878; Referee: Yusuf Namoğlu

14 March 1982 20	Galatasaray SK	0–2	Eskişehirspor	Istanbul
14:30 EET		(Report)	Ergin Demir 55', 84'	Stadium: Ali Sami Yen Stadı; Attendance: 22,339; Referee: Abdülkadir Aypek

21 March 1982 21	Göztepe SK	0–4	Galatasaray SK	İzmir
14:30 EET		(Report)	Metin Yıldız 52', 77', 84'; Ayhan Akbin 66'	Stadium: İzmir Atatürk Stadium; Referee: İlyas Ayan

3 April 1982 22	Galatasaray SK	0–0	Fenerbahçe SK	Istanbul
15:30 EET		(Report)		Stadium: İnönü Stadı; Attendance: 39,949; Referee: Cumhur Demir

11 April 1982 23	Trabzonspor	1–0	Galatasaray SK	Trabzon
14:45 EET	Sinan Ünal 86'	(Report)		Stadium: Hüseyin Avni Aker Stadium; Attendance: 30,000; Referee: Talat Tokat

17 April 1982 24	Galatasaray SK	2–2	Sakaryaspor	Istanbul
15:30 EET	Ayhan Akbin 81'; Sefer Karaer 85'	(Report)	Tuna Güneysu 12'; Şenol Çorlu 23'	Stadium: İnönü Stadı; Attendance: 19,090; Referee: Sadık Deda

25 April 1982 25	Galatasaray SK	0–1	Kocaelispor	Istanbul
16:30 EET		(Report)	Yaşar Altıntaş 23'	Stadium: Ali Sami Yen Stadı; Attendance: 24,162; Referee: Halil Atalık

2 May 1982 26	Adanaspor	2–1	Galatasaray SK	Adana
16:30 EET	Kayhan Kaynak 31', 60'	(Report)	Tarik Hodžić 28'	Stadium: Adana 5 Ocak Stadium; Attendance: 9,228; Referee: Yalçın Gümüşkaya

9 May 1982 27	Bursaspor	0–0	Galatasaray SK	Bursa
16:00 EET		(Report)		Stadium: Bursa Atatürk Stadium; Attendance: 5,000; Referee: Coşkun Evin

16 May 1982 28	Galatasaray SK	1–0	Gaziantepspor	Istanbul
16:00 EET	Sinan Turhan 43'	(Report)		Stadium: Ali Sami Yen Stadı; Attendance: 10,204; Referee: İbrahim Acar

23 May 1982 29	MKE Ankaragücü	2–0	Galatasaray SK	Ankara
16:00 EET	Halil İbrahim Eren 36'; Mehmet Şahin 44'	(Report)		Stadium: Ankara 19 Mayıs Stadium; Attendance: 19,523; Referee: Necmi Temizel

29 May 1982 30	Galatasaray SK	0–0	Altay SK	Istanbul
16:00 EET		(Report)		Stadium: İnönü Stadı; Attendance: 19,306; Referee: Erdoğdu Diyadin

6 June 1982 31	Zonguldakspor	3–1	Galatasaray SK	Zonguldak
16:00 EET	Muammer Birdal 19'; Yaşar Yiğit 35'; Hamit Ayden 66'	(Report)	Bahattin Saykaloğlu 21'	Stadium: Kemal Köksal Stadium; Referee: Celal Türk

13 June 1982 32	Galatasaray SK	2–1	Diyarbakırspor	Istanbul
16:00 EET	Tarik Hodžić 44'; Mirsad Sejdić 60'	(Report)	Mustafa Akülke 54'	Stadium: Ali Sami Yen Stadium; Attendance: 4,946; Referee: Necmi Temizel

== Türkiye Kupası ==
Kick-off listed in local time (EET)

=== 5th Round ===
23 February 1982 1	Galatasaray SK	2–1	Eskişehirspor	Istanbul
16:30 EET	Fatih Terim 27'; Ayhan Akbin 89'	(Report)	Ergin Demir 8'	Stadium: Ali Sami Yen Stadı; Attendance: 8,034; Referee: Coşkun Kutay

3 March 1982 2	Eskişehirspor	1–2	Galatasaray SK	Eskişehir
13:45 EET	Ergin Demir 41'	(Report)	Raşit Çetiner 56'; Ayhan Akbin 82'	Stadium: Eskişehir Atatürk Stadı; Referee: Halil Atalık

=== 6th Round ===
17 March 1982 1	Galatasaray SK	1–0	Antalyaspor	Istanbul
14:30 EET	Ayhan Akbin 72'	(Report)		Stadium: İnönü Stadı; Attendance: 4,139; Referee: Kazım Ünlüsoy

24 March 1982 2	Antalyaspor	0–1	Galatasaray SK	Antalya
13:45 EET		(Report)	Metin Yıldız 89'	Stadium: Antalya Atatürk Stadı; Referee: Hamza Alan

=== 1/4 Final ===
7 April 1982 1	Galatasaray SK	2–0	Fenerbahçe SK	Istanbul
15:30 EET	Cüneyt Tanman 38'; Tarik Hodžić 39'	(Report)		Stadium: İnönü Stadı; Attendance: 39,349; Referee: Erkan Göksel

14 April 1982 2	Fenerbahçe SK	2–2	Galatasaray SK	Istanbul
15:30 EET	Osman Denizci 52'; Alpaslan Eratlı 64' (pen.)	(Report)	Tarik Hodžić 20'; Metin Yıldız 76'	Stadium: İnönü Stadı; Attendance: 39,814; Referee: Cumhur Demir

=== 1/2 Final ===
28 April 1982 1	Galatasaray SK	2–1	Bursaspor	Istanbul
16:30 EET	Mustafa Turgat 2'; Tarik Hodžić 18'	(Report)	Muzaffer Atacan 7'	Stadium: İnönü Stadı; Attendance: 20,657; Referee: Coşkun Kutay

5 May 1982 2	Bursaspor	0–0	Galatasaray SK	Bursa
16:00 EET		(Report)		Stadium: Bursa Atatürk Stadium; Referee: Talat Tokat

=== Final ===
19 May 1982 1	Galatasaray SK	3–0	MKE Ankaragücü	Istanbul
16:30 EET	Sinan Turhan 28'; Tarik Hodžić 37'; Bülent Alkılıç 58'	(Report)		Stadium: Ali Sami Yen Stadı; Attendance: 34,311; Referee: İhsan Türe

26 May 1982 2	MKE Ankaragücü	2–1	Galatasaray SK	Ankara
16:00 EET	Halil İbrahim Eren 32' (pen.), 85'	(Report)	Tarik Hodžić 3'	Stadium: Ankara 19 Mayıs Stadium; Attendance: 20,045; Referee: Sadık Deda

== Süper Kupa-Cumhurbaşkanlığı Kupası ==
Kick-off listed in local time (EET)

16 June 1981 1	Beşiktaş JK	0–2	Galatasaray SK	Ankara
17:00 EET		(Report)	Mirsad Sejdić 28'; Tarik Hodžić 62'	Stadium: Ankara 19 Mayıs Stadium; Attendance: 20,000; Referee: Talat Tokat

== Friendly Matches ==
Kick-off listed in local time (EET)

=== TSYD Kupası ===
8 August 1981 1	Galatasaray SK	2–0	Beşiktaş JK	Istanbul
18:00 EET	Ali Çoban 63'; Raşit Çetiner 65'	(Report)		Stadium: İnönü Stadı; Attendance: 29,571; Referee: Emin Tuncalı

12 August 1981 2	Fenerbahçe SK	2–2	Galatasaray SK	Istanbul
18:00 EET	Osman Denizci 39'; Güngör Tekin 89'	(Report)	Raşit Çetiner 37'; Bülent Alkılıç 86'	Stadium: İnönü Stadı; Attendance: 40,062; Referee: Erkan Göksel

=== Donanma Kupası ===
13 February 1982 1/2 Final	Galatasaray SK	1–0	Trabzonspor	Istanbul
13:30 EET	Raşit Çetiner 77'	(Report)		Stadium: İnönü Stadı; Attendance: 25,780; Referee: Özer Kızıltan

14 February 1982 Final	Fenerbahçe SK	0–0	Galatasaray SK	Istanbul
18:00 EET		(Report)		Stadium: Ali Sami Yen Stadı; Attendance: 28,648; Referee: Yahya Diker

=== Polis Vakfı Kupası ===
19 June 1982 1/2 Final	Beşiktaş JK	1–1	Galatasaray SK	Istanbul
EET	Rasim Kara 12' (pen.)	[ (Report)]	Mirsad Sejdić 38'	Stadium: İnönü Stadı; Referee: Özcan Oal

20 June 1982 3rd Place	Fenerbahçe SK	2–2	Galatasaray SK	Istanbul
EET	Mustafa Arabacıbaşı (?)	[ (Report)]	Raşit Çetiner (?); Bülent Alkılıç (?)	Stadium: İnönü Stadı

== Attendance ==
Competition	Av. Att.	Total Att.
1. Lig	25,913	388,686
Türkiye Kupası	21,298	106,490
Total	24,759	495,185
