= 1980–81 Galatasaray S.K. season =

Galatasaray
1980–81 season
- President: (Turkey) Ali Uras
- Manager: (England) Brian Birch
- Stadium: Inönü Stadi (until End 1980); Ali Sami Yen Stadı
- 1. Lig: 3rd
- Türkiye Kupası: Quarter Finalist
- Top goalscorer: League: Turgay İnal (6); All: Turgay İnal (6)
- Highest home attendance: 40,438 vs Fenerbahçe SK (22 February 1981)
- Lowest home attendance: 11,675 vs Eskişehirspor (24 August 1980)
- Average home league attendance: 25,672
Home colours	Away colours	Third colours

The 1980–81 season was Galatasaray's 77th in existence and the 23rd consecutive season in the Turkish First Football League. This article shows statistics of the club's players in the season, and also lists all matches that the club have played in the season.

== Squad statistics ==
No.	Pos.	Name	1. Lig		Türkiye Kupası		Total	
No.	Pos.	Name	Apps	Goals	Apps	Goals	Apps	Goals
-	GK	(Turkey) Eser Özaltındere	25	0	3	0	28	0
-	GK	(Turkey) Haydar Erdoğan	6	0	3	0	9	0
-	DF	(Turkey) Fatih Terim (C)	27	2	6	0	33	2
-	DF	(Turkey) Cüneyt Tanman	29	3	6	0	35	3
-	DF	(Turkey) Erdoğan Arıca	26	1	5	0	31	1
-	DF	(Turkey) Fettah Dindar	26	0	5	0	31	0
-	DF	(Turkey) Müfit Erkasap	26	3	5	1	31	4
-	DF	(Turkey) Ali Çoban	24	2	6	1	30	3
-	DF	(Turkey) Murat İnan	7	0	1	0	8	0
-	DF	(Turkey) Kadir Özcan	1	0	0	0	1	0
-	MF	(Turkey) Orhan Akyüz	22	1	4	1	26	2
-	MF	(Turkey) Gürcan Aday	13	0	2	0	15	0
-	MF	(Turkey) Mustafa Ergücü	28	4	4	0	32	4
-	MF	(Turkey) Cengiz Yazıcıoğlu	26	0	5	0	31	0
-	MF	(Turkey) Metin Yıldız	24	1	3	0	27	1
-	MF	(Turkey) Turgay İnal	19	6	4	0	23	6
-	MF	(Turkey) Hasan Moralı	2	0	0	0	2	0
-	FW	(Turkey) Reşit Güner	3	0	2	2	5	2
-	FW	(Turkey) Öner Kılıç	13	1	3	0	16	1
-	FW	(Turkey) Bülent Alkılıç	15	2	5	1	20	3
-	FW	(Turkey) Mehmet Özgül	10	2	1	0	11	2
-	FW	(Turkey) Ümit Özkalp	2	0	1	0	3	0
-	FW	(Turkey) Metin Çekiçler	6	0	3	0	9	0

=== Players in / out ===
==== In ====
Pos.	Nat.	Name	Age	Moving from
DF	(Turkey)	Fettah Dindar	25	Istanbulspor
DF	(Turkey)	Ali Çoban	25	Adanaspor
MF	(Turkey)	Cengiz Yazıcıoğlu	27	Kayserispor
DF	(Turkey)	Kadir Özcan	28	Zonguldakspor
FW	(Turkey)	Ümit Özkalp	21	Galatasaray A2
FW	(Turkey)	Mehmet Özgül	30	Bursaspor
FW	(Turkey)	Reşit Güner	27	Eskişehirspor

==== Out ====
Pos.	Nat.	Name	Age	Moving to
FW	(Turkey)	Gökmen Özdenak	33	Retired
DF	(Turkey)	Güngör Tekin	27	Toronto Blizzard
MF	(Turkey)	Gürcan Aday	22	Adana Demirspor

== 1. Lig ==
=== Standings ===
Pos	Team	Pld	W	D	L	GF	GA	GD	Pts	Qualification or relegation
1	Trabzonspor (C)	30	16	7	7	41	21	+20	39	Qualification to European Cup first round
2	Adanaspor	30	13	8	9	36	28	+8	34	Qualification to UEFA Cup first round
3	Galatasaray	30	13	8	9	28	25	+3	34	Invitation to Balkans Cup
4	Gaziantepspor	30	12	9	9	23	22	+1	33	
5	Beşiktaş	30	12	7	11	27	23	+4	31	

Rules for classification: 1) points; 2) goal difference; 3) number of goals scored.
(C) Champions

=== Matches ===
Kick-off listed in local time (EET)

24 August 1980 1	Galatasaray	4–1	Eskişehirspor	İzmir
21:00 EET	Kılıç 13'; Arıca 59'; Ergücü 65'(pen.); Yıldız 85'		Gümüşcan 72'	Stadium: İzmir Atatürk Stadium; Attendance: 11,675; Referee: İhsan Türe

31 August 1980 2	Boluspor	3–0	Galatasaray	Bolu
17:00 EET	Desticioğlu (yellow card) 22'; Konrat 28'; Akdülger 60'; Eren 74'		Erkasap (yellow card) 81'	Stadium: Bolu Atatürk Stadium; Referee: Ünal Şahin

7 September 1980 3	Galatasaray	1–3	Adanaspor	Ankara
17:00 EET	Ergücü 60'		Gümüş 10'; Kahraman 25' 60'; Köprülü (yellow card) 30'; Kesler (yellow card) 34'; Öztürk (yellow card) 64'	Stadium: Ankara 19 Mayıs Stadium; Attendance: 30,000; Referee: Yılmaz Dinçel

19 October 1980 4	Mersin İdmanyurdu	0–1	Galatasaray	Mersin
15:00 EET	Karakuş (yellow card) 51'; Temur (red card) 76'; Öztoprak (yellow card) 78'		Tanman 65' (yellow card) 71'; Kılıç (red card) 76'; Öztürk (yellow card) 64'	Stadium: Tevfik Sırrı Gür Stadium; Referee: İhsan Türe

25 October 1980 5	Galatasaray	0–0	Gaziantepspor	Istanbul
15:30 EET			Evyapan (yellow card) 21'	Stadium: İnönü Stadi; Attendance: 35,012; Referee: İlyas Ayan

2 November 1980 6	Zonguldakspor	2–1	Galatasaray	Zonguldak
14:30 EET	Yıldırım 31'; Badalıoğlu (yellow card) 64'Akbin 87'		Ergücü 9'; Terim (yellow card) 79'	Stadium: Kemal Köksal Stadium; Referee: Ünal Şahin

8 November 1980 7	Galatasaray	3–0	Orduspor	Istanbul
14:45 EET	Alkılıç 20'; Terim (yellow card) 42'; Ergücü 79'; İnal 84'			Stadium: İnönü Stadi; Attendance: 25,364; Referee: Ekrem Yenci

16 November 1980 8	Trabzonspor	3–0	Galatasaray SK	Trabzon
14:15 EET	Arif 4'; İskender 61'; Tuncay 70'	(report)		Stadium: Hüseyin Avni Aker Stadium; Attendance: 13,229; Referee: İhsan Türe

23 November 1980 9	Beşiktaş JK	0–1	Galatasaray SK	Istanbul
14:45 EET		(Report)	Turgay 65'	Stadium: İnönü Stadi; Attendance: 39,968; Referee: Cumhur Demir

7 December 1980 10	Galatasaray SK	1–0	Kocaelispor	Istanbul
14:00 EET	Cüneyt 77'	(Report)		Stadium: İnönü Stadi; Referee: Yavuz Tunç

14 December 1980 11	Adana Demirspor	0–0	Galatasaray SK	Adana
13:30 EET		(Report)		Stadium: Adana 5 Ocak Stadı; Referee: Teoman Parer

21 December 1980 12	Galatasaray SK	0–0	Altay SK	Istanbul
14:00 EET		(Report)		Stadium: Ali Sami Yen Stadı; Attendance: 21,117; Referee: Sadık Deda

28 December 1980 13	Fenerbahçe	0–1	Galatasaray SK	Istanbul
14:00 EET		(Report)	Turgay 25'	Stadium: Inönü Stadı; Attendance: 39,777; Referee: Güngör Tuncel

4 January 1981 14	Galatasaray SK	2–0	Bursaspor	Istanbul
14:00 EET	Turgay 62'; Müfit 68'	(Report)		Stadium: Ali Sami Yen Stadı; Attendance: 26,534; Referee: Teoman Parer

11 January 1981 15	Çaykur Rizespor	0–1	Galatasaray SK	Rize
13:15 EET		(Report)	Turgay 46'	Stadium: Rize Atatürk Stadı; Referee: Talat Tokat

1 February 1981 16	Eskişehirspor	1–0	Galatasaray SK	Eskişehir
14:15 EET	Bilal 73'	(Report)		Stadium: Eskişehir Atatürk Stadı; Referee: İlyas Ayan

8 February 1981 17	Galatasaray SK	3–2	Boluspor	Istanbul
14:30 EET	Turgay 3'; Mehmet 25', 77'	(Report)	Halil İbrahim 4', 73'	Stadium: Ali Sami Yen Stadı; Attendance: 28,994; Referee: Yılmaz Önen

15 February 1981 18	Adanaspor	1–1	Galatasaray SK	Adana
14:00 EET	Ercan 17'	(Report)	Ali 73'	Stadium: Adana 5 Ocak Stadı; Referee: İhsan Türe

22 February 1981 19	Galatasaray SK	1–0	Fenerbahçe SK	Istanbul
14:30 EET	Ali 53'	(Report)		Stadium: İnönü Stadı; Attendance: 40,438; Referee: Cumhur Demir

28 February 1981 20	Galatasaray SK	2–2	Çaykur Rizespor	Istanbul
14:30 EET	Fatih 12', 61'	(Report)	Osman 3'; Sinan 13'	Stadium: İnönü Stadı; Attendance: 18,354; Referee: Halil Atalık

8 March 1981 21	Bursaspor	2–1	Galatasaray SK	Bursa
15:00 EET	Sedat 1'; Muzaffer 73'	(Report)	Bülent 85'	Stadium: Bursa Atatürk Stadium; Referee: Ekrem Yenci

14 March 1981 22	Galatasaray SK	0–0	Mersin İdmanyurdu SK	Istanbul
15:00 EET		(Report)		Stadium: İnönü Stadı; Attendance: 14,788; Referee: İhsan Türe

29 March 1981 23	Gaziantepspor	1–0	Galatasaray SK	Gaziantep
14:30 EET	Yaşar 59'p	(Report)		Stadium: Kamil Ocak Stadı; Referee: Sadık Deda

5 April 1981 24	Galatasaray SK	1–0	Zonguldakspor	Istanbul
15:30 EET	Müfit 67'	(Report)		Stadium: Ali Sami Yen Stadı; Attendance: 24,891; Referee: Talat Tokat

19 April 1981 25	Orduspor	0–1	Galatasaray SK	Ordu
16:00 EET		(Report)	Müfit 36'	Stadium: 19 Eylül Stadı; Referee: Yılmaz Önen

25 April 1981 26	Galatasaray SK	2–1	Trabzonspor	Istanbul
16:00 EET	Orhan 17'; Cüneyt 47'	(Report)	Sinan 9'	Stadium: Ali Sami Yen Stadı; Attendance: 35,240; Referee: Talat Tokat

3 May 1981 27	Galatasaray SK	0–0	Beşiktaş JK	Istanbul
16:00 EET		(Report)		Stadium: Ali Sami Yen Stadı; Attendance: 30,251; Referee: Talat Tokat

10 May 1981 28	Kocaelispor	1–0	Galatasaray SK	İzmit
16:00 EET	Ceyhun 1'	(Report)		Stadium: İsmetpaşa Stadı; Referee: Teoman Parer

17 May 1981 29	Galatasaray SK	0–2	Adana Demirspor	Istanbul
16:00 EET		(Report)	Müjdat 28'; Adnan 84'	Stadium: Ali Sami Yen Stadı; Attendance: 16,743; Referee: Talat Tokat

24 May 1981 30	Altay SK	0–0	Galatasaray SK	İzmir
16:00 EET		(Report)		Stadium: İzmir Atatürk Stadı; Referee: Yılmaz Önen

== Turkiye Kupasi ==
Kick-off listed in local time (EET)

=== 5th Round ===
12 November 1980 1	Zonguldakspor	1–0 (a.e.t.)	Galatasaray SK	Zonguldak
14:30 EET	Ersoy 3'			Stadium: Kemal Köksal Stadi; Attendance: 10,000; Referee: Talat Tokat

17 December 1980 2	Galatasaray SK	2–0	Zonguldakspor	Istanbul
14:00 EET	Orhan 89'; Ali 106'			Stadium: İnönü Stadi; Attendance: 16,111; Referee: Coşkun Kutay

=== 6th Round ===
4 March 1981 1	Galatasaray SK	3–0	KDÇ Karabükspor	Istanbul
14:30 EET	Reşit 9', 42'; Bülent 12'			Stadium: Inönü Stadi; Referee: Necmi Temizel

11 March 1981 2	KDÇ Karabükspor	1–1	Galatasaray SK	Karabük
14:00 EET	Arslan 69'		Müfit 7'	Stadium: Dr Necmettin Şeyhoğlu Stadı; Referee: Yavuz Tunç

=== Quarter-final ===
1 April 1981 1	Boluspor	1–0	Galatasaray SK	Bolu
14:30 EET	Selahattin 78'			Stadium: Bolu Atatürk Stadi; Referee: Kazim Ulusoy

8 April 1981 2	Galatasaray SK	0–2	Boluspor	Istanbul
14:00 EET			Minas 67'; Halil İbrahim 80'	Stadium: Inönü Stadi; Attendance: 22,319; Referee: İhsan Türe

== Friendly Matches ==
Kick-off listed in local time (EET)

=== TSYD Kupası ===
16 August 1980 1	Fenerbahçe SK	5–0	Galatasaray SK	Istanbul
18:00 EET	Ali Kemal Denizci 20'; Raşit Çetiner 32'; Mustafa Arabacıbaşı 44'; Selçuk Yula 55', 82'	(Report)		Stadium: İnönü Stadı; Attendance: 28,696; Referee: Kemal Akay

17 August 1980 2	Galatasaray SK	1–1	Beşiktaş JK	Istanbul
18:00 EET	Mustafa Ergücü 71'	(Report)	Ziya Doğan 21'	Stadium: İnönü Stadı; Attendance: 19,520; Referee: Sina Özcan

== Attendance ==
Competition	Av. Att.	Total Att.
1. Lig	25,672	359,401
Türkiye Kupası	19,215	38,430
Total	24,864	397,831
