= 1985–86 Galatasaray S.K. season =

Galatasaray
1985–86 season
- President: Ali Uras (until 15 March 1986); Ali Tanrıyar
- Manager: Jupp Derwall
- Stadium: İnönü Stadı
- 1. Lig: 2nd
- Türkiye Kupası: 1/2 finalist
- Cup Winners' Cup: 2nd Round
- Top goalscorer: League: Cüneyt Tanman (11); All: Erdal Keser (17)
- Highest home attendance: 40,261 vs Denizlispor (1. Lig, 15 September 1985)
- Lowest home attendance: 8,276 vs Orduspor (Türkiye Kupası, 12 February 1986)
- Average home league attendance: 30,513
Home colours	Away colours

The 1985–86 season was Galatasaray's 82nd in existence and the 28th consecutive season in the 1. Lig. This article shows statistics of the club's players in the season, and also lists all matches that the club have played in the season.

== Squad statistics ==
No.	Pos.	Name	1. Lig		Türkiye Kupası		ECW		Total	
No.	Pos.	Name	Apps	Goals	Apps	Goals	Apps	Goals	Apps	Goals
-	GK	(Socialist Federal Republic of Yugoslavia) Zoran Simović	36	0	5	0	4	0	45	0
-	GK	(Turkey) Cengiz Sökmen	0	0	0	0	0	0	0	0
-	DF	(Turkey) Semih Yuvakuran	15	0	1	0	1	0	17	0
-	DF	(Turkey) Cüneyt Tanman (C)	36	11	5	0	4	0	45	11
-	DF	(Turkey) İsmail Demiriz	32	0	5	0	3	0	40	0
-	DF	(Turkey) Halil İbrahim Akçay	24	0	3	0	3	0	30	0
-	DF	(Turkey) Ahmet Ceyhan	28	0	5	0	4	0	37	0
-	DF	(Turkey) Arkın Tanman	0	0	0	0	0	0	0	0
-	DF	(Turkey) Halil İbrahim Akçay	0	0	0	0	0	0	0	0
-	DF	(Turkey) Raşit Çetiner	34	9	5	2	0	4	43	11
-	DF	(Turkey) Adnan Aydın	0	0	0	0	0	0	0	0
-	DF	(Turkey) Yücel Özkan	0	0	0	0	0	0	0	0
-	DF	(Turkey) Sefer Karaer	2	0	0	0	0	0	0	0
-	DF	(Turkey) Yusuf Altıntaş	33	3	5	0	3	0	41	3
-	DF	(Turkey) Erhan Önal	36	3	3	0	4	1	43	4
-	MF	(Turkey) Kamil Hakan Özkazbek	0	0	0	0	0	0	0	0
-	MF	(Turkey) Şenol Erol Yiğit	0	0	0	0	0	0	0	0
-	MF	(Turkey) Adnan Esen	19	0	3	0	3	0	25	0
-	MF	(Turkey) Orhan Akyüz	0	0	0	0	0	0	0	0
-	MF	(Turkey) Ahmet Keloğlu	0	0	0	0	0	0	0	0
-	MF	(Turkey) Bahattin Saykaloğlu	2	0	2	0	0	0	4	0
-	MF	(Turkey) Mustafa Ergücü	0	0	0	0	0	0	0	0
-	MF	(Turkey) Cengiz Yazıcıoğlu	0	0	0	0	0	0	0	0
-	MF	(Turkey) Metin Yıldız	0	0	0	0	0	0	0	0
-	MF	(Turkey) Arif Kocabıyık	35	1	5	0	4	0	44	1
-	MF	(Socialist Federal Republic of Yugoslavia) Xhevat Prekazi	35	9	5	1	4	1	44	11
-	FW	(Turkey) Öner Kılıç	7	1	0	0	1	0	8	1
-	FW	(Turkey) Bülent Alkılıç	32	7	5	0	4	0	41	7
-	FW	(Turkey) Burak Dilmen	2	0	0	0	0	0	0	0
-	FW	(Turkey) Hasan Reis	0	0	0	0	0	0	0	0
-	FW	(Turkey) Hakan Çarkacı	0	0	0	0	0	0	0	0
-	FW	(Turkey) Hasan Yıldırım	19	2	5	3	0	0	0	0
-	FW	(Turkey) Erkan Ültanır	11	2	0	0	1	0	12	2
-	FW	(Turkey) Erdal Keser	29	9	5	2	3	1	37	12

=== Players in / out ===
==== In ====
Pos.	Nat.	Name	Age	Moving from
MF	(Socialist Federal Republic of Yugoslavia)	Xhevat Prekazi	28	Hajduk Split
DF	(Turkey)	Erhan Önal	28	Standard Liège
MF	(Turkey)	Arif Kocabıyık	27	Fenerbahçe SK
FW	(Turkey)	Erkan Ültanır	20	Galatasaray A2

==== Out ====
Pos.	Nat.	Name	Age	Moving to
DF	(Turkey)	Fatih Terim	32	Career end
FW	(Germany)	Rüdiger Abramczik	29	Malatyaspor
MF	(Turkey)	Metin Yıldız	25	Malatyaspor
MF	(Turkey)	Mustafa Ergücü	30	Tarsus İdman Yurdu
DF	(Turkey)	Halil İbrahim Akçay	25	Tarsus İdman Yurdu
FW	(Turkey)	Rıza Tuyuran	25	Tarsus İdman Yurdu
FW	(Turkey)	Levent Erköse	26	Diyarbakırspor

== 1. Lig ==
=== Standings ===
Pos	Team	Pld	W	D	L	GF	GA	GD	Pts	Qualification or relegation
1	Beşiktaş (C)	36	22	12	2	65	21	+44	56	Qualification to European Cup first round
2	Galatasaray	36	20	16	0	57	20	+37	56	Qualification to UEFA Cup first round
3	Samsunspor	36	19	10	7	57	25	+32	48	
4	Sarıyer	36	14	15	7	36	23	+13	43	
5	Fenerbahçe	36	13	16	7	40	32	+8	42	

Rules for classification: 1) points; 2) goal difference; 3) number of goals scored.
(C) Champions

=== Matches ===
31 August 1985 1	Galatasaray SK	3–0	Samsunspor	Istanbul
17:00 EET	Dzevad Prekazi 39', 83'; Cüneyt Tanman 80'	(Report)		Stadium: İnönü Stadı; Attendance: 40,032; Referee: Talat Tokat

8 September 1985 2	Altay SK	0–1	Galatasaray SK	İzmir
15:30 EET		(Report)	Dzevad Prekazi 18'	Stadium: İzmir Atatürk Stadı; Referee: Çoşkun Kutay

15 September 1985 3	Galatasaray SK	2–1	Denizlispor	Istanbul
15:30 EET	Bülent Alkılıç 24', 61'	(Report)	Zafer Dinçer 48'	Stadium: İnönü Stadı; Attendance: 40,261; Referee: Ahmet Akçay

21 September 1985 4	Kayserispor	0–0	Galatasaray SK	Kayseri
15:30 EET		(Report)		Stadium: Kayseri Atarük Stadı; Referee: Necmi Temizel

28 September 1985 5	Galatasaray SK	1–1	Malatyaspor	Istanbul
15:30 EET	Erdal Keser 14'	(Report)	Oktay Çevik 17'	Stadium: İnönü Stadı; Attendance: 37,549; Referee: İlyas Ayan

6 October 1985 6	Fenerbahçe SK	1–1	Galatasaray SK	Istanbul
15:30 EET	Selçuk Yula 9'	(Report)	Bülent Alkılınç 11'	Stadium: Fenerbahçe Stadı; Attendance: 25,639; Referee: Özcan Oal

13 October 1985 7	Galatasaray SK	0–0	Gençlerbirliği SK	Istanbul
15:00 EET		(Report)		Stadium: İnönü Stadı; Attendance: 25,541; Referee: Necmi Temizel

2 November 1985 8	Galatasaray SK	2–0	Rizespor	Istanbul
14:30 EET	Bülent Alkılınç 54'; Öner Kılıç 18' (pen.)	(Report)		Stadium: İnönü Stadı; Attendance: 28,913; Referee: Burhan Koç

9 November 1985 9	Eskişehirspor	1–1	Galatasaray SK	Eskişehir
14:00 EET	Ahmet Kılıç 65'	(Report)	Erkan Ültanır 76'	Stadium: Atatürk Stadı; Referee: Talat Tokat

16 November 1985 10	Galatasaray SK	3–0	Sakaryaspor	Istanbul
14:30 EET	Dzevad Prekazi 33'; Erkan Ültanır 55'; Yusuf Altıntaş 80'	(Report)		Stadium: İnönü Stadı; Attendance: 17,423; Referee: İbrahim Acar

24 November 1985 11	Trabzonspor	0–1	Galatasaray SK	Istanbul
14:00 EET		(Report)	Cüneyt Tanman 69'	Stadium: Hüseyin Avni Aker Stadı; Referee: Talat Tokat

1 December 1985 12	Galatasaray SK	1–0	Zonguldakspor	Istanbul
14:00 EET	Erhan Önal 38'	(Report)		Stadium: İnönü Stadı; Attendance: 29,265; Referee: Çoşkun Kutay

8 December 1985 13	Beşiktaş	0–0	Galatasaray SK	Istanbul
14:00 EET		(Report)		Stadium: İnönü Stadı; Attendance: 38,713; Referee: Ergül Yücedağ

14 December 1985 14	Galatasaray SK	4–0	Bursaspor	Istanbul
14:00 EET	Raşit Çetiner 16'; Erhan Önal 32'; Erdal Keser 58'; Arif Kocabıyık 66' (pen.)	(Report)		Stadium: İnönü Stadı; Attendance: 25,964; Referee: Burhan Koçak

22 December 1985 15	MKE Ankaragücü	1–1	Galatasaray SK	Ankara
14:00 EET	Metin Barut 85'	(Report)	Erdal Keser 76'	Stadium: Ankara 19 Mayıs Stadı; Referee: Osman Erdal

29 December 1985 16	Galatasaray SK	1–1	Kocaelispor	Istanbul
14:00 EET	Dzevad Prekazi 34'	(Report)	Muharrem Dirik 90'	Stadium: İnönü Stadı; Attendance: 32,068; Referee: İbrahim Acar

4 January 1986 17	Sarıyer G.K.	0–0	Galatasaray SK	Istanbul
14:00 EET		(Report)		Stadium: İnönü Stadı; Referee: Erkan Göksel

12 January 1986 18	Galatasaray SK	3–2	Orduspor	Istanbul
14:00 EET	Raşit Çetiner 21'; Erdal Keser 38'; Cüneyt Tanman 41'	(Report)	Sinan Bayraktar 22'; Mahmut Kılıç 30'	Stadium: İnönü Stadı; Attendance: 30,004; Referee: Talat Tokat

26 January 1986 19	Samsunspor	1–1	Galatasaray SK	Samsunspor
13:30 EET	Tanju Çolak 46'	(Report)	Bülent Alkılıç 12'	Stadium: 19 Mayıs Stadı; Referee: Ahmet Akçay

2 February 1986 20	Galatasaray SK	5–1	Altay SK	Istanbul
14:00 EET	Bülent Alkılıç 19', 43'; Cüneyt Tanman 27', 76'; Hasan Yıldırım 87'	(Report)	Turgut Uçar 46'	Stadium: İnönü Stadı; Attendance: 29,154; Referee: Talat Tokat

9 February 1986 21	Denizlispor	1–2	Galatasaray SK	Denizli
14:00 EET	Bahtiyar Yorulmaz 58'	(Report)	Erdal Keser 25'; Cüneyt Tanman 30'	Stadium: Atatürk Stadı; Referee: Hasan Ceylan

16 February 1986 22	Galatasaray SK	5–2	Kayserispor	Istanbul
14:00 EET	Raşit Çetiner 27' (pen.); Dzevad Prekazi 70', 85'; Cüneyt Tanman 76'; Yusuf Altıntaş 77'	(Report)	Hajrudin Dzarbozovic 67'; Orhan Akyüz 82' (pen.)	Stadium: İnönü Stadı; Attendance: 36,148; Referee: İhsan Türe

23 February 1986 23	Malatyaspor	1–1	Galatasaray SK	Malatya
14:00 EET	Oktay Çevik 46'	(Report)	Cüneyt Tanman 12'	Stadium: İnönü Stadı; Referee: Sadık Deda

1 March 1986 24	Galatasaray SK	0–0	Fenerbahçe SK	Istanbul
15:00 EET		(Report)		Stadium: İnönü Stadı; Attendance: 23,774; Referee: Yusuf Namoğlu

9 March 1986 25	Gençlerbirliği SK	0–1	Galatasaray SK	Ankara
14:00 EET		(Report)	Hasan Yıldırım 77'	Stadium: 19 Mayıs Stadı; Referee: Sadık Deda

16 March 1986 26	Orduspor	0–0	Galatasaray SK	Ordu
14:00 EET		(Report)		Stadium: 19 Eylül Stadı; Referee: İbrahim Acar

30 March 1986 27	Rizespor	0–2	Galatasaray SK	Rize
14:00 EET		(Report)	Cüneyt Tanman 35'; Erdal Keser 65'	Stadium: Atatürk Stadı; Referee: Ahmet Akçay

6 April 1986 28	Galatasaray SK	2–1	Eskişehirspor	Istanbul
15:00 EET	Raşit Çetiner 11'; Erdal Keser 82'	(Report)	Şenol Ulusavaş 52'	Stadium: İnönü Stadı; Attendance: 39,610; Referee: Burhan Koçak

13 April 1986 29	Sakaryaspor	2–4	Galatasaray SK	Adapazarı
15:00 EET	Aykut Yiğit 42' (pen.); Sinan Turhan 74'	(Report)	Dzevad Prekazi 12'; Erdal Keser 24', 77'; Raşit Çetiner 69' (pen.)	Stadium: Atatürk Stadı; Referee: Sadık Deda

20 April 1986 30	Galatasaray SK	0–0	Trabzonspor	Istanbul
15:00 EET		(Report)		Stadium: İnönü Stadı; Attendance: 22,106; Referee: İbrahim Acar

27 April 1986 31	Zonguldakspor	0–0	Galatasaray SK	Zonguldak
15:00 EET		(Report)		Stadium: Atatürk Stadı; Referee: Ahmet Akçay

4 May 1986 32	Galatasaray SK	1–1	Beşiktaş JK	Istanbul
17:00 EET	Yusuf Altıntaş 33'	(Report)	Ziya Doğan 74'	Stadium: İnönü Stadı; Attendance: 32,755; Referee: Yusuf Namoğlu

11 May 1986 33	Bursaspor	0–1	Galatasaray SK	Bursa
15:30 EET		(Report)	Erhan Önal 86'	Stadium: Atatürk Stadı; Referee: İbrahim Acar

18 May 1986 34	Galatasaray SK	5–2	MKE Ankaragücü	Istanbul
15:30 EET	Raşit Çetiner 23' (pen.), 40' (pen.), 63' (pen.); Cüneyt Tanman 51', 81'	(Report)	Kemal Yıldırım 18', 66'	Stadium: İnönü Stadı; Attendance: 37,956; Referee: Sadık Deda

25 May 1986 35	Kocaelispor	0–1	Galatasaray SK	Izmit
15:30 EET		(Report)	Dzavad Prekazi 32'	Stadium: İsmet Paşa Stadı; Referee: Çoşkun Kutay

1 June 1986 36	Galatasaray SK	5–2	Sarıyer G.K.	Istanbul
15:30 EET	Raşit Çetiner 23' (pen.)	(Report)		Stadium: İnönü Stadı; Attendance: 20,710; Referee: Özcan Oal

== Türkiye Kupası ==
Kick-off listed in local time (EET)

=== 5th Round ===
5 February 1986 1	Orduspor	0–0	Galatasaray SK	Ordu
14:00 EET		(Report)		Stadium: Ordu 19 Eylül Stadı; Referee: İlyas Ayan

12 February 1986 2	Galatasaray SK	4–0	Orduspor	Istanbul
14:00 EET	Erdal Keser 13'; Hasan Yıldırım 59', 89'; Xhevat Prekazi 87'	(Report)		Stadium: Fenerbahçe Stadı; Attendance: 8,276; Referee: Kazım Ünlüsoy

=== 6th round ===
5 March 1986	Galatasaray SK	2–1	Trabzonspor	Istanbul
15:00 EET	Raşit Çetiner 22' (pen.); Erdal Keser 44'	(Report)	Hasan Şengün 88'	Stadium: İnönü Stadı; Attendance: 30,000; Referee: Talat Tokat

=== 1/4 final ===
26 March 1986	Galatasaray SK	2–1	MKE Ankaragücü	Istanbul
14:00 EET	Hasan Yıldırım 6'; Raşit Çetiner 41'	(Report)	Kemal Yıldırım 35'	Stadium: İnönü Stadı; Attendance: 25,921; Referee: Sadık Deda

=== 1/2 final ===
16 April 1986	Galatasaray SK	1–2	Altay SK	Istanbul
14:00 EET		(Report)	İsa Ertürk 80'	Stadium: İnönü Stadı; Attendance: 11,739; Referee: İhsan Türe

== European Cup Winners' Cup ==
=== 1st round ===
18 September 1985 1	Galatasaray SK	1–0	Widzew Łódź	Istanbul
	Erhan Önal 13' (pen.)	(Report)		Stadium: Ali Sami Yen Stadı; Attendance: 34,247; Referee: (East Germany) Bernd Stumpf

2 October 1985 2	Widzew Łódź	2–1	Galatasaray SK	Łódź
	Wiesław Cisek 1'; Jerzy Leszczyk 90'	(Report)	Erdal Keser 54'	Stadium: Stadion Widzewa; Referee: (England) Alan Robinson

=== 2nd round ===
23 October 1985 1	KFC Uerdingen 05	2–0	Galatasaray SK	Krefeld
	Wolfgang Schäfer 35'; Rudi Bommer 85'	(Report)		Stadium: Grotenburg-Stadion; Referee: (Denmark) Henning-Lund Sörensen

5 November 1985 2	Galatasaray SK	1–1	KFC Uerdingen 05	Istanbul
	Xhevat Prekazi 81'	(Report)	Matthias Herget 34'	Stadium: Ali Sami Yen Stadı; Attendance: 23,777; Referee: (Switzerland) Bruno Galler

== Başbakanlık Kupası ==
Kick-off listed in local time (EET)

6 June 1986 1	Galatasaray SK	8–1	Altay SK	Ankara
16:00 EET	Erdal Keser 6', 30', 60', 70', 89'; Raşit Çetiner 24'; Xhevat Prekazi 80'; Erhan Önal 82'	(Report)	Erdi Demir 76'	Stadium: 19 Mayıs Stadı; Attendance: 5,097; Referee: Ahmet Akçay

== Friendly Matches ==
Kick-off listed in local time (EET)

=== TSYD Kupası ===
17 August 1985 1	Fenerbahçe SK	2–0	Galatasaray SK	Istanbul
17:00 EET	Önder Çakar 9'; Şenol Çorlu 75'	(Report)		Stadium: Fenerbahçe Stadı; Attendance: 26,706; Referee: Yahya Diker

18 August 1985 2	Galatasaray SK	2–2	Beşiktaş JK	Istanbul
17:00 EET	Raşit Çetiner 45'; Burak Dilmen 50'	(Report)	Metin Tekin 11'; Bora Öztürk 61'	Stadium: İnönü Stadı; Attendance: 29,700; Referee: Yusuf Namoğlu

=== Donanma Kupası ===
15 January 1986 1	Beşiktaş JK	2–1	Galatasaray SK	Istanbul
15:00 EET	Bora Öztürk 30'; Necdet Ergün 50'	(Report)	Yusuf Altıntaş 26'	Stadium: İnönü Stadı; Attendance: 6,490; Referee: Haşim Gökalp

18 January 1986 2	Fenerbahçe SK	2–2	Galatasaray SK	Istanbul
14:00 EET	Tuğrul Duru 15'; İlyas Tüfekçi 32'	(Report)	Bülent Alkılıç 18'; Hakan Çarkacı 75'	Stadium: İnönü Stadı; Attendance: 8,995; Referee: Yahya Diker

== Attendance ==
Competition	Av. Att.	Total Att.
1. Lig	30,513	549,233
Türkiye Kupası	18,984	75,936
ECW	29,012	58,024
Total	28,466	683,193

== See also ==
- List of unbeaten football club seasons
