= Denizci =

Denizci is a Turkish surname literally meaning "sailor". Notable people with the surname include:

- Ali Kemal Denizci (born 1950), Turkish football player and manager
- Osman Denizci (born 1957), Turkish football player and manager
