= 1983–84 Balkans Cup =

Tournament details
- Country: Balkans
- Teams: 3

Final positions
- Champions: (Bulgaria) Beroe Stara Zagora
- Runners-up: (Romania) Argeș Pitești

Tournament statistics
- Matches played: 6
- Goals scored: 20 (3.33 per match)

The 1983–84 Balkans Cup was an edition of the Balkans Cup, a football competition for representative clubs from the Balkan states.

Since no clubs from Albania, Greece, or Yugoslavia entered, Group B was scratched and Beroe Stara Zagora, the winners of Group A, were awarded the trophy.

== Group A ==
Pos	Team	Pld	W	D	L	GF	GA	GR	Pts	Qualification
1	(Bulgaria) Beroe Stara Zagora (C)	4	3	0	1	9	7	1.286	6	Winners
2	(Romania) Argeș Pitești	4	2	0	2	7	6	1.167	4	
3	(Turkey) Galatasaray	4	1	0	3	4	7	0.571	2	

Source: rsssf.com
Rules for classification: 1) points; 2) goal average; 3) number of goals scored
(C) Champions
19 October 1983

Argeș Pitești (Romania)	4–2	(Bulgaria) Beroe Stara Zagora

1 Mai, Pitești

25 October 1983

Galatasaray (Turkey)	2–0	(Romania) Argeș Pitești
Turhan 71', 90'

Ali Sami Yen, Istanbul

12 November 1983

Beroe Stara Zagora (Bulgaria)	2–1	(Romania) Argeș Pitești

Beroe, Stara Zagora

28 December 1983

Galatasaray (Turkey)	0–1	(Bulgaria) Beroe Stara Zagora
		Tanev 36' (pen.)

Ali Sami Yen, Istanbul

6 June 1984

Argeș Pitești (Romania)	2–0	(Turkey) Galatasaray
Nica 61'; Ignat 68'

1 Mai, Pitești

10 June 1984

Beroe Stara Zagora (Bulgaria)	4–2	(Turkey) Galatasaray
Lipenski 2'; Mitev 7'; Diragolov 28', 71'		Tanman 62'; Terim 81' (pen.)

Beroe, Stara Zagora
