= List of Göztepe S.K. presidents =

The following is a list of presidents of Göztepe.

== Presidents ==
Name	From / To	Honours
Rahmi Filibeli	1925	
Fehmi Simsaroğlu	1925–1950	1 Turkish Football Championship, 5 İzmir Football League champions
Şevket Filibeli	1950–1962	1 İzmir Football League champions
Şerif Tikveşli	1962–1963	1 Turkish Federation Cup
Sebahattin Süvari	1962–1963	
Saffet Kuyaş	1963–1965	
Macit Birsel	1965–1967	2 TSYD İzmir Cup
Süleyman Filibeli	1967–1968	
Sebahattin Süvari	1968–1970	2 Turkish Cup, 1 Turkish Super Cup, 1 TSYD İzmir Cup
Nuri Öz	1970–1973	
Rüştü Ünsal	1973	
İsmail Tiryakiler	1973	
Mekin Kutucular	1973	
Nuri Öz	1974	
Mekin Kutucular	1975	
Özdemir Arnas	1976	
Orhan Daut	1976–1978	1 TFF First League champions, 3 TSYD İzmir Cup
Selamet Batur	1979	
Tacettin Hiçyılmaz	1980	
Özdemir Arnas	1981	1 TFF First League champions
Muzaffer Atılgan	1982–1983	
Şerif Tikveşli	1984	
Özdemir Arnas	1985	
Çoşkun Gencerler	1986–1987	
Halit Horozoğlu	1987	
Ömer Köymen	1988	
İbrahim Şavkar	1988	
Cemal Gözümoğulları	1989	
Özdemir Arnas	1989–1992	1 TSYD İzmir Cup
Kenan Bilgiç	1993	
Atilla Türkkal	1993–1994	
Taşdan Erdan	1994	
Mustafa Cücen	1995	1 TSYD İzmir Cup
Bülen Özkul	1996	
Levent Ürkmez	1997	
Kamil Uçar	1997	
Aydın Bilgin	1998–2000	1 TFF First League champions
Hamdi Türkmen	2000–2002	1 TFF First League champions, 1 TSYD İzmir Cup
Feyyaz Gülmen	2002–2003	
İskender Tuğsuz	2003–2005	
Uğur Bostancıoğlu	2005–2006	
Levent Ürkmez	2006–2007	
Gündüz Balkan	2007–2008	
İsmail Hakkı Gül	2008	
İmam Altınbaş	2008–2013	1 TFF Third League champions, 1 TFF Second League champions
Hüseyin Altınbaş	2013–2014	
Mehmet Sepil	2014–2022	1 TFF Second League champions
Rasmus Ankersen	2022–	
