= Kadir Özcan =

Turkish footballer and coach

Personal information
- Full name: Ömer Kadri Özcan
- Date of birth: 21 June 1952
- Place of birth: Akçaabat, Trabzon Province, Turkey
- Date of death: 22 October 2013 (aged 61)
- Place of death: Akçaabat, Trabzon Province, Turkey
- Position: Defender

International career
Years	Team	Apps	(Gls)
1975–1976	Turkey	5	(0)

Ömer Kadri Özcan (21 June 1952 – 22 October 2013) was a Turkish football player and coach, who primarily played as a defender.

== Death ==
Özcan died of a heart attack on 22 October 2013, aged 61, in his hometown of Akçaabat, Trabzon Province.
