= Zafer Tüzün =

Turkish footballer and manager

Personal information
- Full name: Zafer Tüzün
- Date of birth: 30 August 1962 (age 64)
- Place of birth: Eskişehir, Turkey
- Position: Striker

Senior career*
Years	Team	Apps	(Gls)
1980–1985	Eskişehirspor	66	(12)
1985–1988	Fenerbahçe	50	(14)
1988–1989	Adana Demirspor	30	(11)
1989–1990	Sakaryaspor	26	(10)
1990–1993	Bakırköyspor	76	(43)
1993–1994	Kayseri Erciyesspor	27	(11)
1994–1995	Eskişehirspor	41	(32)
1995–1996	Denizlispor	10	(2)
1996–1998	Diyarbakırspor	9	(3)

International career^{‡}
1979–1981	Turkey U18	9	(2)
1984	Turkey U21	2	(0)
1984	Turkey	2	(0)

Managerial career
- 2000–2001: Eskişehirspor
- * Club domestic league appearances and goals as of 3 April 2018 ‡ National team caps and goals as of 3 April 2018

Zafer Tüzün (born 30 August 1962) is a Turkish former football player and manager who played as a striker.

He was best known for his stints at Eskişehirspor, his local club, where he started playing football. He made his professional debut with Eskişehirspor, returned to them when finishing his career, managed them after retiring, and eventually became their president.

== Honours ==
Fenerbahçe

- TSYD Cup (3): 1985-86, 1986-87
