= Orhan Uçak =

Turkish footballer and manager

Personal information
- Full name: Orhan Uçak
- Date of birth: 1 January 1956 (age 70)
- Place of birth: Adana, Turkey
- Position: Defender

Senior career*
Years	Team	Apps	(Gls)
1975–1988	Adana Demirspor	257	(13)

Managerial career
- 1993–1994: Osmaniyespor
- 1994–1995: Adana Polisgücü
- 1996–1999: Tarsus IY
- 1999: Niğdespor
- 1999: Adana Demirspor
- 1999–2000: Karamanspor
- 2000–2002: Niğdespor
- 2002–2003: Cizrespor
- 2004–2005: Niğdespor
- 2005–2006: Adana Demirspor
- * Club domestic league appearances and goals

Orhan Uçak (born 1 January 1956) is a former football defender who played for clubs in Turkey and a manager.

== Career ==
Born in Adana, Uçak played for local side Adana Demirspor during his entire senior football career. He made over 250 Süper Lig appearances in a 10-year stint with the club.

After he retired from playing football, Uçak became a manager for several lower-level Turkish clubs. He was appointed manager of Adana Demirspor in 2005.
