= Kemal Serdar =

Turkish footballer (born 1962)

Personal information
- Date of birth: 9 December 1962 (age 63)
- Place of birth: Akçaabat, Turkey
- Position: Defender

Senior career*
| Years | Team | Apps | (Gls) |
| 1983–1995 | Trabzonspor | 357 | (18) |
| 1997 | Erdoğduspor | | |

International career
| 1984–1991 | Turkey | 10 | (0) |
- * Club domestic league appearances and goals

Kemal Serdar (born 9 December 1962) is a Turkish former footballer who played as a defender.

== Early life ==
Serdar was born in 1962 in Turkey. His father died when he was four years old.

== Career ==
Serdar played for Turkish side Trabzonspor. He captained the club.

== Personal life ==
Serdar has been nicknamed "Atmaca". He has five siblings.
