= Hüseyin Çakıroğlu =

Turkish footballer

Personal information
- Full name: Hüseyin Çakıroğlu
- Date of birth: 19 September 1957
- Place of birth: Istanbul, Turkey
- Date of death: 26 October 1986 (aged 29)
- Place of death: Istanbul, Turkey
- Position: Midfielder

Youth career
- 1972–1976: Davutpaşa SK

Senior career*
Years	Team	Apps	(Gls)
1976–1979	Karabükspor		
1979–1984	Gaziantepspor	114	(25)
1984–1986	Fenerbahçe	47	(7)

International career^{‡}
1982–1985	Turkey U21	4	(0)
1983–1986	Turkey	14	(0)
- * Club domestic league appearances and goals as of 3 April 2018 ‡ National team caps and goals as of 3 April 2018

Hüseyin Çakıroğlu (19 September 1957 – 26 October 1986), nicknamed Doktor (English, the doctor) was a Turkish footballer who played as a midfielder. A ten-time international for the Turkey national football team, Çakıroğlu died suddenly of cancer in 1986 at the age of 29.

== Professional career and death ==
Çakıroğlu had discomfort in his leg from a slow-growing tumor, but despite openly suffering from it became a professional footballer. Çakıroğlu spent his early career with Gaziantepspor, and stayed with the team even when they were relegated despite interest from Fenerbahçe. He ended up transferring to Fenerbahçe in 1984, and in his first season with them helped them win the Süper Lig.

In the summer of 1986, Çakıroğlu's condition worsened, and it was found that the tumor in his leg had metastasized, spreading to his lungs and brain. He was taken to the United States for treatment but died on 26 October 1986.

== Honours ==
Fenerbahçe

- Süper Lig (1): 1984–1985
- Turkish Super Cup (2): 1984, 1985
- Fleet Cup (1): 1984
- Istanbul TSYD Cup (1): 1985

Gaziantepspor

- Adana TSYD Cup (1): 1979
