= Erdal Keser =

Turkish footballer (born 1961)

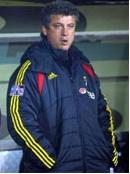
- Keser in 2007

Personal information
- Full name: Ali Erdal Keser
- Date of birth: 20 June 1961 (age 65)
- Place of birth: Sivas, Turkey
- Height: 1.79 m (5 ft 10 in)
- Position: Forward

Senior career*
Years	Team	Apps	(Gls)
1980–1984	Borussia Dortmund	82	(22)
1984–1986	Galatasaray	49	(18)
1986–1987	Borussia Dortmund	24	(5)
1987–1989	Sarıyer	58	(29)
1989–1994	Galatasaray	93	(21)
Total		306	(95)

International career
1982–1991	Turkey	25	(2)

Managerial career
- 2007–2009: Galatasaray (assistant)
- 2015: Wil
- * Club domestic league appearances and goals

Ali Erdal Keser (born 20 June 1961) is a Turkish former professional footballer who is director of sport of Galatasaray. A forward, he played for Borussia Dortmund, Galatasaray, Sarıyer and the Turkey national team.

== Career ==
Keser was born in Sivas, Turkey but his family moved to Hagen, West Germany, where he grew up. He began his youth career with SSV Hagen. Borussia Dortmund signed him when he was 17 years old and started with the regular squad at the age of 18. He transferred to Galatasaray in 1984–85 season and played there for two seasons. He returned to Borussia Dortmund for the 1986–87 season. He then signed for Sarıyer and became team captain. In 1989, he returned for a second spell at Galatasaray where he played until retirement in 1994.

He was the assistant manager for Eric Gerets at Galatasaray between 2007 and 2009. In May 2015 Keser was announced to be the new manager of Swiss outfit FC Wil.

Keser made 25 appearances for the Turkey national team from 1982 to 1991.

Sporting positions
Preceded by Cüneyt Tanman	Galatasaray captain 1991–1994	Succeeded by Tugay Kerimoğlu
