= Sead Čelebić =

Bosnian footballer

Personal information
- Date of birth: 26 February 1956 (age 70)
- Place of birth: Višegrad, SFR Yugoslavia
- Position: Midfielder

Senior career*
Years	Team	Apps	(Gls)
1977–1979	Sutjeska	31	(8)
1980–1982	Borac Banja Luka	61	(7)
1982–1987	Sarıyer	135	(49)
Total		227	(64)
- * Club domestic league appearances and goals

Sead Čelebić (born 26 February 1956) is a Bosnian retired football midfielder who played in the former Yugoslavia and Turkey.

== Career ==
Born in Višegrad, Čelebić started playing football for the youth side of FK Sutjeska Nikšić. In 1977, he signed his first professional contract with the club, but would leave for Yugoslav First League side FK Borac Banja Luka in January 1980.

He transferred to Sarıyer before the 1982-1983 season, playing five seasons with the club in the Süper Lig. After his playing career ended, he applied for Turkish citizenship and changed his name to Saffet Çelebi.
