= Ali Kemal Denizci =

Turkish footballer (born 1950)

Personal information
- Date of birth: 1 March 1950 (age 76)
- Place of birth: Trabzon, Turkey
- Position: Winger

Youth career
- 1968–1970: Çarşıbaşıspor
- 1970–1971: Trabzon Yolspor
- 1971–1972: Çaykur Rizespor

Senior career*
Years	Team	Apps	(Gls)
1972–1978	Trabzonspor	98	(24)
1978–1981	Fenerbahçe	58	(11)
1981–1983	Beşiktaş	50	(8)

International career
1975–1982	Turkey	27	(3)

Managerial career
- 1990–1991: Trabzonspor (youth)
- 1991–1992: Kartalspor
- 1992–1994: Kardemir Karabükspor
- 1994: İstanbulspor
- 1995–1995: Hatayspor
- 1995–1996: Maltepespor
- 1996: Boluspor
- 1996–1997: Çaykur Rizespor
- 1997–1998: Trabzonspor (youth)
- 1998: Trabzonspor
- 1998–1999: Elazığspor
- 2000–2001: Kardemir Karabükspor
- * Club domestic league appearances and goals

Ali Kemal Denizci (born 1 March 1950) is a Turkish football manager and former player. A winger, he played for Trabzonspor, Fenerbahçe and Beşiktaş. He was nicknamed Fırtına Kemal (English: Storm Kemal) because of his lightning pace.

== Club career ==
Ali Kemal joined Trabzonspor in 1972 after a couple of seasons of playing amateur football. He helped the team get promoted to the Süper Lig for the first time in their history, and was their superstar player when they won their first two Süper Lig titles in the 1975–76, and 1976–77 seasons. In 1978, Trabzonspor had to sell him to cover their revenues, and he moved to Fenerbahçe, causing the Trabzonspor fans to riot in the streets. Ali Kemal ended his career with Beşiktaş where he won the 1981–82 1.Lig, and he played his final game in 1983 against his former club Trabzonspor.

== International career ==
Ali Kemal was the first-ever Trabzonspor player to play for the Turkey national team. He made 27 appearances for Turkey, scoring 3 times.

== Personal life ==
Ali Kemal's brother, Osman Denizci, was also a professional footballer in the Süper Lig, who played alongside him in Fenerbahçe.

== Honours ==
Trabzonspor

- Süper Lig: 1975–76, 1976–77
- Turkish Cup: 1976–77, 1977–78
- Turkish Super Cup: 1976, 1977, 1978

Fenerbahçe

- Turkish Cup: 1978-1979
- TSYD Cup: 1979, 1980, 1981

Beşiktaş

- Süper Lig: 1981–1982
