= Müfit Erkasap =

Turkish football coach

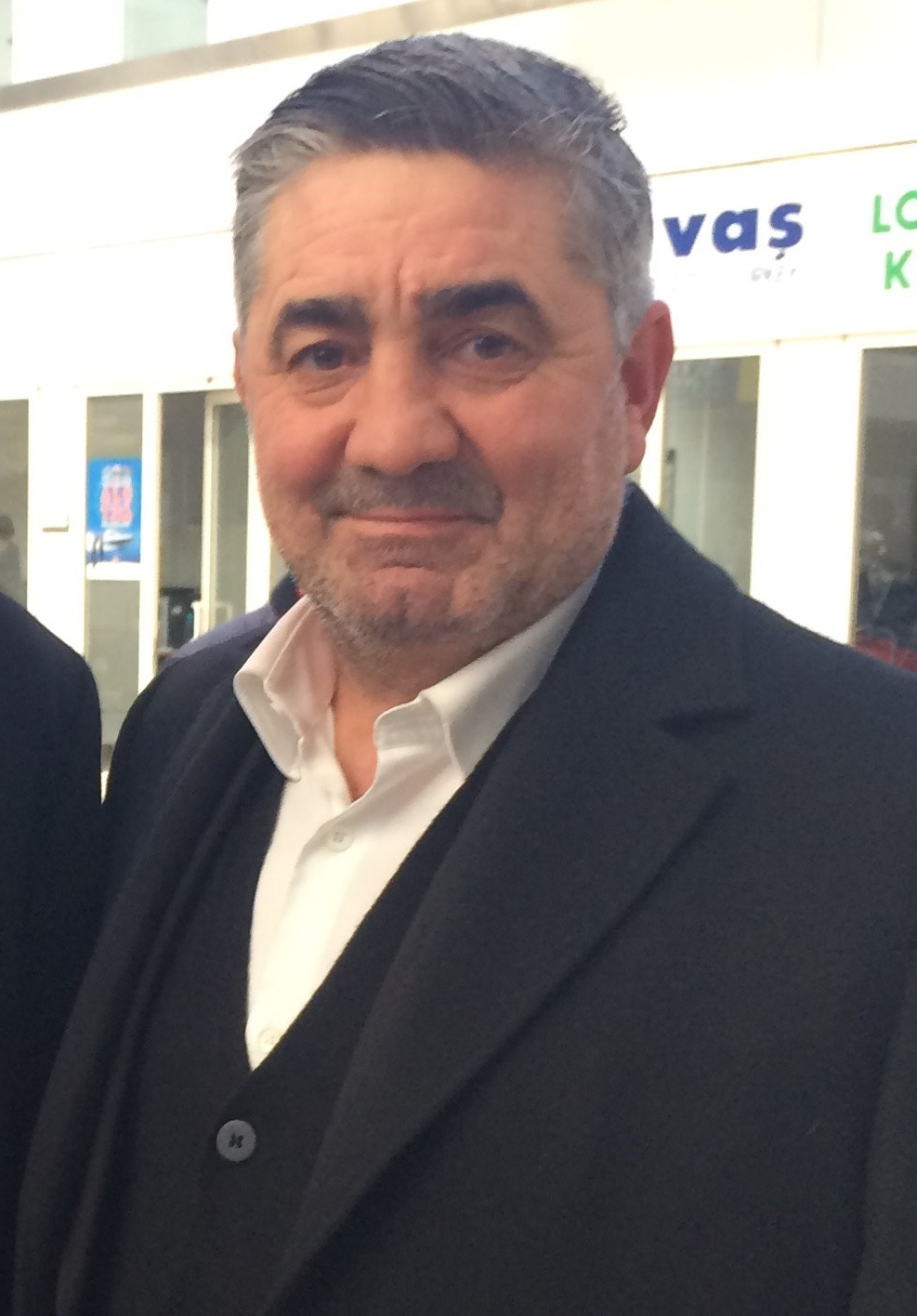

Müfit Erkasap is a Turkish football coach mostly known as the assistant coach of Fatih Terim at Galatasaray SK and Fiorentina. He is also a former footballer who played as a defender. He played for Orduspor, Galatasaray, Anadoluspor and Bandırmaspor.
