= Muzaffer Badalıoğlu =

Turkish footballer

Personal information
- Full name: Muzaffer Badalıoğlu
- Date of birth: 13 November 1960
- Place of birth: Havza, Turkey
- Date of death: 20 January 1989 (aged 28)
- Place of death: Havza, Turkey
- Position: Defender

Senior career*
Years	Team	Apps	(Gls)
1978–1985	Zonguldakspor	185	(8)
1985–1989	Samsunspor	98	(1)
Total		283	(9)

International career
1978–1979	Turkey U18	13	(1)
1979–1981	Turkey U21	4	(0)
1981–1983	Turkey	4	(0)
- * Club domestic league appearances and goals

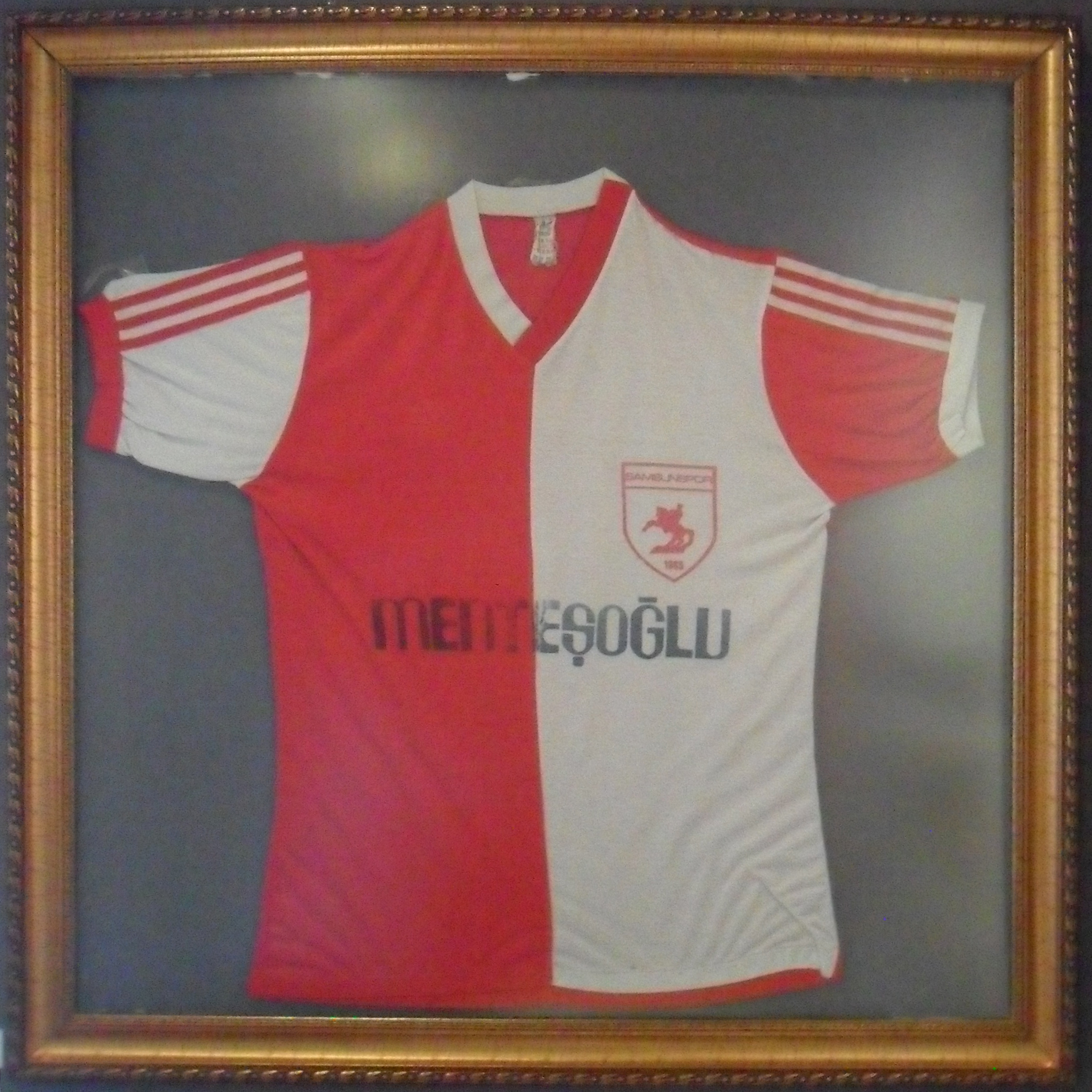
The shirt of Muzaffer Badalıoğlu on display at the Samsun City Museum. Badalıoğlu wore this jersey for the last time in the match before the January 20th Disaster.

Muzaffer Badalıoğlu (13 November 1960 – 20 January 1989) was a Turkish footballer who last played as a defender for Samsunspor, and also appeared for the Turkey national football team.

The Samsunspor team bus was involved in a traffic accident in Havza on the way to a match in Malatya on 20 January 1989, killing the team coach, five players and the bus driver instantly. Badalıoğlu was one of the players who died.
