= Osman Denizci =

Turkish footballer and manager

Personal information
- Full name: Osman Denizci
- Date of birth: October 13, 1957 (age 69)
- Place of birth: Trabzon, Turkey
- Height: 1.82 m (6 ft 0 in)
- Position: Midfielder

Youth career
- 1975–1979: Erzurumspor

Senior career*
Years	Team	Apps	(Gls)
1978–1981	Çaykur Rizespor	60	(20)
1981–1983	Fenerbahçe	55	(9)
1983–1986	Trabzonspor	47	(3)
1984–1985	→Bursaspor (loan)	16	(3)
1986–1988	Fenerbahçe	33	(4)

International career^{‡}
1975–1976	Turkey U18	11	(0)
1979–1982	Turkey U21	3	(0)
1980–1982	Turkey	3	(0)

Managerial career
- 1993–1994: Kartalspor (assistant)
- 1995–1996: Haçka Spor
- 2005: Maltepespor
- 2006–2008: Trabzonspor (assistant)
- 2011–2012: Armutlu Belediyespor
- * Club domestic league appearances and goals as of 2 March ‡ National team caps and goals as of 2 March 2018

Osman Denizci (born 13 October 1957) is a Turkish former football player, who played as a midfielder, and manager. He was best known for scoring the title-winning goal for Fenerbahçe in the 1982-1983 Süper Lig. He was nicknamed Delikanlı Osman (English: Osman the Sincere).

== Professional career ==
Osman begun his footballing career with Çaykur Rizespor, and moved to Fenerbahçe on the request of his brother, Ali Kemal Denizci, who was a star of the team. In the 1982-83 season, Osman was told he would be sold in the summer of 1983 to Trabzonspor, which was Fenerbahçe's rival for the title at the time. Osman continued playing for Fenerbahçe as the season was closing and scored the Süper Lig-winning goal on the last matchday, against Bursaspor, on 10 June 1983. He won his second consecutive Süper Lig with Trabzonspor the following season.

== International career ==
A youth international for Turkey, Osman represented the Turkey national football team three times.

== Personal life ==
Osman's older brother, Ali Kemal Denizci, was a legendary player in the Süper Lig, who played alongside him in Fenerbahçe.

== Honours ==
Fenerbahçe

- Süper Lig (1): 1982–83
- Turkish Federation Cup (1): 1982-83
- Fleet Cup (1): 1983
- TSYD Cup (3): 1981, 1983, 1987

Trabzonspor

- Süper Lig (1): 1983-84
- Turkish Federation Cup (1): 1983-84
