= Rıza Tuyuran =

Turkish footballer

Personal information
- Date of birth: 25 August 1960 (age 66)
- Place of birth: Istanbul, Turkey

Managerial career
- Years: Team
- 1995–1996: Karşıyaka (assistant)
- 1997–1998: Karşıyaka (youth)
- 1998: Karşıyaka (assistant)
- 1998–1999: Malatyaspor
- 1999–2000: Karşıyaka
- 2000–2001: Bucaspor
- 2002: Muğlaspor
- 2004–2005: Altınordu
- 2007: Denizli Belediyespor
- 2007: Göztepe
- 2011–2013: Karşıyaka (youth coord.)
- 2014–2015: Karşıyaka (youth coord.)
- 2015: Karşıyaka (assistant)
- 2015: Karşıyaka (caretaker)
- 2017: Tarsus Idman Yurdu
- 2017–2018: Karaköprü Belediyespor (assistant)

Rıza Tuyuran (born 25 August 1960) is a retired Turkish football player and later manager.
