= Tarik Hodžić =

Bosnian footballer (born 1951)

Personal information
- Date of birth: 1 December 1951 (age 74)
- Place of birth: Sarajevo, FPR Yugoslavia
- Position: Striker

Youth career
- 1966: Željezničar

Senior career*
Years	Team	Apps	(Gls)
1970–1975	Željezničar	18	(7)
1970–1973	→ Famos Hrasnica (loan)	45	(28)
1975–1976	Olimpija Ljubljana	10	(0)
1976–1978	Velež Mostar	41	(13)
1979–1981	RFC de Liège	50	(18)
1981–1984	Galatasaray	66	(28)
1984–1985	Sarıyer	30	(8)
1986–1987	Bakırköyspor	2	(1)

Managerial career
- 1997: Željezničar (caretaker)
- * Club domestic league appearances and goals

Tarik Hodžić (born 1 December 1951) is a retired Bosnian footballer.

== Playing career ==
Born in Sarajevo, Hodžić started playing football with hometown club Željezničar's youth team. In 1970, he signed his first professional contract with the club, but was loaned out to Famos Hrasnica. He played there for three seasons. After he was the topscorer of the Yugoslav Second League in 1973 with 28 goals, he then returned to Željezničar where he played for two seasons.

After that, Hodžić played for Olimpija Ljubljana and then moved to Velež Mostar where he spent two seasons. He went abroad and signed with Belgian side RFC de Liège where he was the best goalscorer. The striker then went to Turkey upon signing a three-year contract with Galatasaray. He was the topscorer of the Turkish championship in the 1983–1984 season with 16 goals, becoming the first foreign top goal scorer in Turkiye. After three years of playing for the Turkish club, he transferred to Sarıyer G.K. in 1984–1985 season. In the 1985–1986 season, he played for Turkish Second Division side Babaeskispor before finishing his career with Bakırköyspor in 1987.

== Personal Life ==
As of 2026, Hodžić owns a restaurant in Baščaršija.

== Honours ==
=== Player ===
Galatasaray

- Turkish Cup: 1981–82
- Turkish Super Cup: 1982
