= Mirsad Sejdić =

Bosnian footballer

Personal information
- Date of birth: 21 August 1953 (age 73)
- Place of birth: Jajce, SFR Yugoslavia
- Position: Forward

Senior career*
Years	Team	Apps	(Gls)
–1976	Elektrobosna Jajce		
1976–1980	Borac Banja Luka	96	(8)
1980–1982	Olimpija Ljubljana	60	(7)
1982–1984	Galatasaray	52	(24)
1984–1985	Bursaspor	32	(14)
1985–1986	Altay	34	(9)
1986–1988	Bakırköyspor		
- * Club domestic league appearances and goals

Mirsad Sejdić (born 21 August 1953) is a former Bosnian football forward who played in the former Yugoslavia and Turkey.

== Career ==
Born in Jajce, Sejdić started playing football for the youth side of Elektrobosna Jajce. In 1976, he joined Yugoslav First League side FK Borac Banja Luka. After four years with Borac Banja Luka, he moved to NK Olimpija Ljubljana for two seasons.

He transferred to Galatasaray S.K. during the 1981–82 season, playing two seasons with the club in the Süper Lig. He scored twice in the club's 1982–83 European Cup Winners' Cup second round loss to FK Austria Wien. Stints with Süper Lig rivals Bursaspor and Altay S.K. followed.

Sejdić retired from playing football after the 1988–89 season. In 1990, he emigrated to the United States before the outbreak of the Bosnian War.
