= Ahmet Keloğlu =

Turkish footballer

Personal information
- Date of birth: 15 January 1962 (age 64)
- Place of birth: Turkey
- Position: Midfielder

Senior career*
Years	Team	Apps	(Gls)
-1982	ADO Den Haag	52	(2)
1982-1984	Galatasaray S.K.		(3+)
1984-1988	Kocaelispor	142	(20)
1988-1992	Karşıyaka S.K.	113	(7)
1992/1993	Konyaspor	1	(0)

International career
1984	Turkey	1	(0)
- * Club domestic league appearances and goals

Ahmet Keloğlu (born 15 January 1962 in Turkey) is a Turkish retired footballer.
