= Selçuk Yula =

Turkish footballer (1959–2013)

Personal information
- Full name: Selçuk Yula
- Date of birth: November 8, 1959
- Place of birth: Ankara, Turkey
- Date of death: August 6, 2013 (aged 53)
- Place of death: Istanbul, Turkey
- Position: Striker

Youth career
- 1976–1979: Şekerspor

Senior career*
Years	Team	Apps	(Gls)
1979–1986	Fenerbahçe	160	(64)
1986–1987	Blau-Weiß 90 Berlin	11	(2)
1987–1991	Sarıyer	76	(30)
1991–1992	Galatasaray	4	(1)
Total		251	(97)

International career
1976–1978	Turkey U18	13	(4)
1979–1982	Turkey U21	6	(1)
1981–1988	Turkey	22	(4)
- * Club domestic league appearances and goals

Selçuk Yula (November 8, 1959 – August 6, 2013) was a Turkish football player and topscorer.

== Professional career ==
Yula started his career in the Ankara club Şekerspor. His transfer to Fenerbahçe at the age of 19, had been a milestone in his career, where he became twice league topscorer with 16 goals in 1982, with 19 goals in 1983, and he won two league titles with Fenerbahçe, where he scored a total of 134 goals. He also played and scored in the match against Bordeaux, European Champions of the time, that Fenerbahçe won 3–2.

Yula played for Blau-Weiß 90 Berlin in German Bundesliga in the season 1986–1987. He then came back to Turkey to play for Sarıyer (1987–1991) and then Galatasaray (1991–1993). He quit his professional career under Fenerbahçe jersey, in a specially scheduled match played between Fenerbahçe vs. Erzurumspor in Şükrü Saracoğlu Stadium.

== International ==
He was capped 22 times for the Turkey national football team, including three times as the team-captain.

== Other interests ==
Yula was a sports journalist with the newspaper Fotomaç and also served as sports critic and expert for the Fenerbahçe TV and ATV with weekly appearances. He was selected as the "Best Sports Critic of the Year" among the polls made within the Fenerbahçe fans in 2005 and 2007.

== Death ==
On August 6, 2013, Yula died at the age of 53 of a heart attack.
