= Halil İbrahim Eren =

Turkish footballer

Personal information
- Full name: Halil İbrahim Eren
- Date of birth: January 20, 1956 (age 70)
- Place of birth: Tekirdağ, Turkey
- Position: Striker

Youth career
- 1972–1973: Yılmazspor
- 1973–1974: Tekirdağspor
- 1974–1976: Bandırmaspor

Senior career*
Years	Team	Apps	(Gls)
1976–1981	Boluspor	111	(37)
1981–1985	Ankaragücü	123	(53)
1985–1988	Gençlerbirliği	83	(16)
1987	→Samsunspor (loan)	11	(3)
1988–1989	Sakaryaspor	24	(4)

International career^{‡}
1977–1983	Turkey U21	8	(0)
1980–1984	Turkey	8	(0)

Managerial career
- 1992–1993: Ankaragücü (youth)
- 1993–1994: Ankaragücü
- 1994–1995: Aydınspor
- 1996: Linyitspor
- 1998–1999: Gölcükspor
- 1999–2000: Ankaragücü (B-team)
- 2002–2003: Ankaragücü (youth)
- 2003–2005: Ankaragücü (youth technical manager)
- 2007–2008: 100.YIL Spor
- 2017: Tekirdağspor
- * Club domestic league appearances and goals as of 3 April 2018 ‡ National team caps and goals as of 3 April 2018

Halil İbrahim Eren (born 20 January 1956) is a Turkish former footballer who played as a striker. He spent his entire playing career in the Turkish Süper Lig, and joined a select few players with over 100 goals in the competition. He is an eight-time international for the Turkey national football team.

== Professional career ==
Eren begun his football career in amateur football with Yılmazspor, Tekirdağspor, and finally Bandırmaspor. After impressing, he joined Boluspor where he became the star player, and became one of Turkey's most expensive transfers where he moved to Ankaragücü. He is strongly associated with Ankaragücü, with whom he became a coach with after retiring as a footballer.

== Honours ==
Boluspor

- Prime Minister's Cup (1): 1980-81

Gençlerbirliği

- Turkish Federation Cup (1): 1986-87
