= Sakarya Atatürk Stadium =

Sports venue in Adapazarı, Turkey

Coordinates: 40°46′37.25″N 30°23′11.61″E

- Interactive map of Sakarya Atatürk Stadium
- Location: Adapazarı, Turkey
- Capacity: 13,216
- Surface: Grass

Construction
- Opened: 1980
- Demolished: 2018

Tenant
- Sakaryaspor (1980–2017)

Sakarya Atatürk Stadium (Turkish: Sakarya Atatürk Stadı) was a multi-purpose stadium in Adapazarı, Turkey. It was currently used mostly for football matches and was the home stadium of Sakaryaspor. The stadium used to hold 13,216 spectators. It was named after the Turkish statesman Mustafa Kemal Atatürk. In 2018, the stadium was demolished.
