= Raşit Çetiner =

Turkish football player and manager (born 1956)

Personal information
- Date of birth: 10 September 1956 (age 70)
- Place of birth: Istanbul, Turkey
- Height: 1.82 m (6 ft 0 in)
- Position: Midfielder

Senior career*
Years	Team	Apps	(Gls)
1973-1975	İstanbulspor		
1975-1976	Göztepe		
1976-1978	Kocaelispor		
1978-1981	Fenerbahçe		
1981-1988	Galatasaray		
Total		291	(52)

International career
1978-1985	Turkey MNT	20	(1)

Managerial career
- 1988-2005: Turkey U21 MNT
- 1993: Gaziantepspor
- 1993-1995: Altay
- 1995: Kayseri Erciyesspor
- 1996: Çanakkale Dardanelspor
- 1997: Denizlispor
- 2005-2006: Bursaspor
- 2007: Antalyaspor
- 2008: Konyaspor
- 2009: Rizespor
- 2010-2011: Turkey U21 MNT
- 2013: Şanlıurfaspor
- * Club domestic league appearances and goals

Raşit Çetiner (born 10 September 1956) is a Turkish football coach and a former player of Galatasaray (1981–1988) and Fenerbahçe (1978–1981). He also played for Kocaelispor between 1974 and 1978. In 1978, when playing for Kocaelispor he became the top goal-scorer in TFF First League and awarded as the Player of the Year. In 1982 and 1985 he helped Galatasaray win the Turkish Cup. He retired in 1988 after sustaining a serious injury in a Galatasaray-Samsunspor match in 1986–87.

He also managed the Turkey U21 national team for many years. He resigned when his team fell to a 2–1 defeat against Kazakhstan and he was succeeded by Reha Kapsal.

Çetiner is married and has two sons named Erdem and Doruk.

== Honours ==
=== Player ===
Galatasaray

- Turkish Super League: 1987, 1988
- Turkish Cup: 1982, 1985

=== Manager ===
Galatasaray

- Turkish Cup: 1991 (as assistant coach)

Bursaspor

- TFF First League: 2005

Turkey U21

- Participation in UEFA European Under-21 Championship: 2000 (First in Turkish football history)
