= Metin Yıldız =

Turkish footballer

Personal information
- Date of birth: 24 November 1960 (age 65)
- Place of birth: Sivas, Turkey
- Position: Midfielder

Senior career*
Years	Team	Apps	(Gls)
1978–1985	Galatasaray		
1982–1983	→ Zonguldakspor (loan)		
1984–1985	→ Konyaspor (loan)		
1985–1987	Malatyaspor		
1987–1988	Adana Demirspor		
1988–1992	Galatasaray		
1989–1990	→ Zeytinburnuspor (loan)		
1992	→ Kayserispor (loan)		
1992–1993	Mersin İdman Yurdu		

International career
1980–1988	Turkey	7	(1)

Managerial career
- 1998–2002: Galatasaray (youth/academy)
- 2002–2003: Yıldırım Bosna
- 2004–2005: Galatasaray (assistant)
- 2005: Çaykur Rizespor
- 2006: Sakaryaspor
- 2007: Malatyaspor
- 2008: Etimesgut Şekerspor
- 2008: Adana Demirspor
- 2008: Adanaspor
- * Club domestic league appearances and goals

Metin Yıldız (born 24 November 1960) is a retired Turkish football midfielder.
