= Sinan Turhan =

Turkish footballer

Personal information
- Date of birth: 10 February 1956 (age 70)
- Place of birth: Bilecik Province, Turkey
- Position: Forward

Sinan Turhan (born 10 February 1958) is a Turkish former footballer who played as a forward for Galatasaray and the Turkey national team.

== Honours ==
Galatasaray

- Turkish Cup: 1981–82

Sakaryaspor

- Turkish Cup: 1987–88
