= Cüneyt Tanman =

Turkish footballer

Personal information
- Full name: Mehmet Cüneyt Tanman
- Date of birth: 16 January 1956 (age 70)
- Place of birth: Istanbul, Turkey
- Height: 1.81 m (5 ft 11 in)
- Position: Centre-back

Senior career*
| Years | Team | Apps | (Gls) |
| 1972–1991 | Galatasaray | 404 | (41) |
| 1975–1976 | → Giresunspor (loan) | 24 | (2) |
| Total | | 428 | (43) |

International career
| 1977–1989 | Turkey | 17 | (0) |
- * Club domestic league appearances and goals

Cüneyt Tanman (born 16 January 1956, in Istanbul) is a Turkish former footballer who played as a centre-back. He made 17 appearances for the Turkey national team.

With the exception of the 1975–76 season where he was loaned to Giresunspor, Tanman player for Galatasaray during his football career. He played between 1974 and 1991 and used to play most positions for the team. He played 533 games for Galatasaray, most of them as the team captain. He won the Turkish title in 1987 and 1988. Later in his career he appeared as a guest player for the opposition in Peter Shilton's testimonial match.

He worked as manager of Galatasaray between 2004 and 2006 and currently works as a football commentator in newspapers.

== Honours ==
=== As player ===
Galatasaray

- Süper Lig: 1986–87, 1987–88
- Turkish Cup: 1981–82, 1984–85, 1990–91
- Turkish Super Cup: 1981–82, 1986–87, 1987–88, 1990–91
- Chancellor Cup: 1978–79, 1985–86, 1989–90
- TSYD Cup: 1978, 1982, 1988

Sporting positions
| Preceded by Fatih Terim | Galatasaray captain 1985–1991 | Succeeded by Erdal Keser |
