= List of Galatasaray S.K. records and statistics =

Below are statistics and records related to Galatasaray.

== Honours ==
=== Domestic titles ===
- Süper Lig

Winners (26) (record): 1961–62, 1962–63, 1968–69, 1970–71, 1971–72, 1972–73, 1986–87, 1987–88, 1992–93, 1993–94, 1996–97, 1997–98, 1998–99, 1999–2000, 2001–02, 2005–06, 2007–08, 2011–12, 2012–13, 2014–15, 2017–18, 2018–19, 2022–23, 2023–24, 2024–25, 2025–26
Runners-up (13): 1956–57, 1957–58, 1959, 1960–61, 1965–66, 1974–75, 1978–79, 1985–86, 1990–91, 2000–01, 2002–03, 2013–14, 2020–21

- Turkish Cup

Winners (19) (record): 1962–63, 1963–64, 1964–65, 1965–66, 1972–73, 1975–76, 1981–82, 1984–85, 1990–91, 1992–93, 1995–96, 1998–99, 1999–2000, 2004–05, 2013–14, 2014–15, 2015–16, 2018–19, 2024–25
Runners-up (5): 1968–69, 1979–80, 1993–94, 1994–95, 1997–98

- Turkish Super Cup

Winners (17) (record): 1966, 1969, 1972, 1982, 1987, 1988, 1991, 1993, 1996, 1997, 2008, 2012, 2013, 2015, 2016, 2019, 2023
Runners-up (11): 1971, 1973, 1976, 1985, 1994, 1998, 2006, 2014, 2018, 2024, 2025

- Turkish National Division

Winners (1): 1939
Runners-up (5): 1937, 1940, 1941, 1943, 1950

- Turkish Football Championship

Runners-up (1): 1949

- Atatürk Cup

Runners-up (1): 2000

- Prime Minister's Cup

Winners (5): 1975, 1979, 1986, 1990, 1995
Runners-up (2): 1980, 1989

- 50. Anniversary Cup

Winners (1): 1973

=== European titles ===
- UEFA Cup

Winners (1): 1999–2000

- UEFA Super Cup

Winners (1): 2000

=== Regional titles ===
- Istanbul Football League

Winners (15): 1908–09, 1909–10, 1910–11, 1914–15, 1915–16, 1921–22, 1924–25, 1925–26, 1926–27, 1928–29, 1930–31, 1948–49, 1954–55, 1955–56, 1957–58

- Istanbul Football Cup

Winners (2): 1941–42, 1942–43 (shared-record)

- Istanbul Shield

Winners (1): 1932–33

=== Doubles and Trebles ===
- Doubles
  - Süper Lig and Turkish Cup (4): 1962–63, 1972–73, 1998–99, 2024–25
  - Süper Lig and TFF Super Cup (9): 1968–69, 1971–72, 1986–87, 1987–88, 1996–97, 2007–08, 2011–12, 2012–13, 2022–23
- Domestic trebles
  - Süper Lig, Turkish Cup and TFF Super Cup (3): 1992–93, 2014–15, 2018–19
- International trebles
  - Süper Lig, Turkish Cup and UEFA Europa League (1): 1999–2000

=== Other titles ===
- Turkish Amateur Football Championship

Winners (1): 1952

- TSYD Cup

Winners (12): 1963, 1966, 1967, 1970, 1977, 1981, 1987, 1991, 1992, 1997, 1998, 1999 (shared-record)
Runners-up (9): 1965, 1969, 1971, 1973, 1976, 1979, 1980, 1986, 1991

- Atatürk Gazi Cup

Winners (1): 1928

- Emirates Cup

Winners (1): 2013

- Uhrencup

Winners (1): 2016

- Antalya Cup

Winners (1): 2014

== Team records ==
=== Süper Lig ===
==== Points ====
- Most points in a season (Süper Lig record):
  - 102 points in 2023–24 season.
- Team having exceeded 90 points in consecutive seasons (Süper Lig record):
  - 102 points in 2023–24 season.
  - 95 points in 2024–25 season.
- Maximum difference over the runner up:
  - 12 points over Beşiktaş in the 1987–88 season.

==== Streaks ====
- Consecutive Süper Lig titles (Süper Lig record):
  - Won 4 championship titles: 1996–97, 1997–98, 1998–99, 1999–2000; 2022–23, 2023–24, 2024–25, 2025–26.
- Best home start in Süper Lig:
  - 54 points gathered in 18 weeks 2023–24 season.
- Longest consecutive home wins in Süper lig from first game:
  - Starting 18 home games in 2023–24 season.
- Longest consecutive wins in season start:
  - Won starting 7 games in 2025–26 season.
- Longest consecutive away wins without goals conceded:
  - Won last 3 away games in 2024–25 season and won starting 2 away games in 2025–26 season without conceding goals.
- Biggest home win in Süper Lig:
  - Won 8–0 over Altınordu in 1959–60.
- Biggest away win in Süper Lig (Süper Lig record):
  - Won 0–8 over Ankaragücü in 1992–93.
- Longest consecutive scoring at home in Süper Lig:
  - 35 games between game 5 of the 2022–23 season to game 18 of the 2023–24 season.
- Longest winning run in Süper Lig (Süper Lig record):
  - 17 games in the 2023–24 season.

==== Wins ====
- Most wins in a Süper Lig season

Rank	Season	Wins	Weeks	Win %
1	2023–2024	33 (Süper Lig record)	38	86.84
2	2024–2025	30	36	83.33
3	2022–2023	28	36	77.77
3	1962–1963	28	42	66.67
4	1960–1961	27	38	71.05
4	1987–1988	27	38	71.05
5	2005–2006	26	34	76.47
6	1996–1997	25	34	73.52
6	2011–2012	25	40	62.50

- Most home wins in a Süper Lig season

Rank	Season	Wins	Weeks	Win %
1	2023–2024	18	19	94.73
2	2001–2002	17	17	100.00
3	1960–1961	17	19	89.47
4	2017–2018	16	17	94.11
5	2024–2025	15	18	83.33

- Most away wins in a Süper Lig season

Rank	Season	Wins	Weeks	Win %
1	2024–2025	15	18	83.33
2	2023–2024	15	19	78.94
3	2020–2021	14	20	70.00
4	1996–1997	13	17	76.47
5	2022–2023	13	18	72.22
6	2000–2001	12	17	70.58
7	1987–1988	12	19	63.15
8	2011–2012	12	20	60.00

- Most consecutive wins in a Süper Lig season

Rank	Season	Matches
1	2023–2024	17 (Süper Lig record)
2	2022–2023	14
3	1987–1988	9
3	2011–2012	9
4	1993–1994	8
4	1997–1998	8
4	1999–2000	8
4	2019–2020	8
4	2024–2025	8

- Most consecutive home wins in a Süper Lig season

Rank	Season	Matches
1	2023–2024	18
2	2001–2002	17
3	1960–1961	12
4	1999–2000	11
5	2022–2023	10

- Most consecutive home wins league

Rank	Matches	Period
1	25 (Süper Lig record)	26 May 2001 to 16 November 2002
2	21	8 May 2023 to 5 May 2024
3	16	1 January 1961 to 10 September 1961

- Most consecutive away wins league

Rank	Matches	Period
1	17 (Süper Lig record)	21 January 2024 to 12 January 2025
2	9	30 November 2002 to 4 May 2003
2	9	11 April 2025 to 1 November 2025
3	6	19 March 1988 to 28 August 1988
3	6	15 September 1996 to 6 December 1996
3	6	31 January 1999 to 25 April 1999
3	6	28 October 2022 to 5 March 2023

===== Record wins =====
- 8–0, Galatasaray – Altınordu, 1959–1960, 24 October 1959
- 0–8, Ankaragücü – Galatasaray, 1992–1993, 30 May 1993
  - 9–2, Galatasaray – Adana Demirspor, 1983–1984, 11 December 1983
  - 1–8, Altay – Galatasaray, 1996–1997, 27 October 1996
  - 7–0, Galatasaray – Erzurumspor, 2000–2001, 19 August 2000
  - 0–7, Karabükspor – Galatasaray, 2017–2018, 3 March 2018
  - 0–7, İstanbul Başakşehir – Galatasaray, 2022–2023, 12 November 2022

==== Unbeaten ====
- Longest unbeaten run in domestic league

Rank	Matches	
1	37	2 June 1985 to 24 August 1986
2	28	12 December 1987 to 24 September 1988
2	28	26 May 2024 to 29 March 2025
3	24	15 August 1999 to 26 March 2000

- Longest unbeaten run (at home) in domestic league

Rank	Matches	
1	41	19 May 2024 to present
1	41	19 May 2017 to 22 November 2019
2	35	13 August 2022 to 5 May 2024
2	35	29 September 1996 to 29 September 1998
3	33	16 May 1982 to 29 April 1984

- Longest unbeaten run (away) in domestic league

Rank	Matches	
1	40	7 February 1998 to 12 May 2000
2	28	8 September 1985 to 15 February 1986
3	25	25 November 2023 to 9 March 2025

- Longest unbeaten club in a single season
  - 36 games in 1985–86 season

==== Goals ====
- Most goals in a Süper Lig season

Rank	Season	Goals	Apps	goal/match
1	1962–1963	105 (Süper Lig record)	42	2.5
2	2023–2024	92	38	2.42
3	2024–2025	91	36	2.53
4	1996–1997	90	34	2.65
5	1997–1998	86	34	2.53
5	1987–1988	86	38	2.26
7	1998–1999	85	34	2.5
8	2022–2023	83	36	2.31

- Most away goals in a Süper Lig season

Rank	Season	Goals	Apps	goal/match
1	1996–1997	45	17	2.65
1	2024–2025	45	18	2.5
3	2022–2023	42	18	2.33
4	2023–2024	41	18	2.28
5	1998–1999	40	17	2.35

==== Most goals in a season – all competitions ====
Rank	Season	League		Cup		Europe		Super Cup		Total	
Rank	Season	Goals	Apps	Goals	Apps	Goals	Apps	Goals	Apps	Goals	Apps
1	1962–1963	105	42	27	8	9	6	–	–	141	56
2	2024–2025	91	36	16	6	24	12	–	1	131	55
3	2023–2024	92	38	8	3	26	14	3	1	129	56
4	1999–2000	77	34	16	5	29	17	–	–	122	56
5	2000–2001	77	34	17	4	27	17	–	–	119	55
6	1998–1999	85	34	14	8	13	8	–	–	112	50
7	2009–2010	61	16	7	26	14	–	–	–	110	55

=== Türkiye Kupası ===
==== Wins ====
- Most wins in a Türkiye Kupası season

Rank	Season	Wins	Matches	Win %
1	2015–2016	9	12	75.00
2	2014–2015	8	12	66.67
3	1962–1963	7	8	87.50
4	1981–1982	7	10	70.00
5	1984–1985	7	10	70.00

- Most consecutive wins

Rank	Matches	
1	9	5 May 1999 to 7 February 2001
2	8	1 May 1963 to 21 June 1964

===== Record Wins =====
- 1–9, FBM Yaşamspor – Galatasaray, 2014–2015, 16 December 2014
  - 7–0, Galatasaray – Kastamonuspor 1966, 2022–2023, 19 October 2022
  - 7–0, Galatasaray – Eskişehir Demirspor, 1975–1976, 7 January 1976
  - 7–0, Galatasaray – Vanspor, 2000–2001, 29 November 2000
  - 6–0, Galatasaray – Karşıyaka, 1962–1963, 26 December 1962
  - 6–0, Galatasaray – Adana Milli Mensucat SK, 1967–1968, 1 November 1967

==== Unbeaten ====
- Longest unbeaten run at Türkiye Kupası

Rank	Matches	
1	26	7 October 1962 to 14 May 1967
2	14	19 April 1972 to 17 April 1974
2	14	20 November 1984 to 16 April 1986

- Longest unbeaten run (at home) at Türkiye Kupası

Rank	Matches	
1	37	26 December 1962 to 17 April 1974
2	24	22 December 2004 to 20 March 2012
3	17	14 December 1995 to 4 March 2003
3	17	22 January 2015 to 18 April 2018

- Longest unbeaten run (away) at Türkiye Kupası

Rank	Matches	
1	12	7 October 1962 to 14 May 1967
2	10	15 November 1972 to 24 December 1975

==== Goals ====
- Most goals in a Türkiye Kupası season

Rank	Season	Goals	Matches	goal/match
1	2014–2015	37	12	3.08
2	1962–1963	27	8	3.38
3	2015–2016	25	12	2.08
4	2013–2014	23	11	2.09
5	2016–2017	22	8	2.75

=== All domestic competitions (Süper Lig, Türkiye Kupası and Süper Kupa) ===
- Most consecutive wins

Rank	Matches	
1	17	8 November 2022 to 11 March 2023
2	13	3 March 1988 to 3 September 1988

=== International ===
- First and only Turkish club to have won a European competition trophy
  - Galatasaray has won the UEFA Cup and UEFA Super Cup in 2000
- Most consecutive wins in the UEFA Champions League:
  - 3 wins during the 2012–13 and 2025–26 seasons.
- Most goals in a UEFA Champions League season:
  - 19 goals during the 2000–01 season.
- Highest home win in UEFA Champions League:
  - 5–2 over (Italy) Juventus in 2025–26.
- Highest away win in UEFA Champions League:
  - 1–4 over (Germany) Hertha BSC in 1999–2000.
- Highest home win in all European competition matches
  - 6–0 over (Israel) Maccabi Netanya F.C. in 2009–10.
- Highest away win in all European competition matches
  - 1–5 over (Luxembourg) Avenir Beggen in 1994–95 and over (Serbia) OFK Belgrad in 2010–11.
- Most matches played in one single season
  - 18 matches in 1999–2000 season.
- Longest unbeaten run in European competitions
  - 15 matches between 26 October 1999 to 12 September 2000 (includes also the UEFA Cup Final and UEFA Super Cup matches in 2000)
- FIFA Club World Cup participations.
  - 2001 FIFA Club World Cup, however the tournament was cancelled by FIFA to due financial reasons.
- Highest IFFHS World's Best Club ranking.
  - In year 2000, Galatasaray ended secondly at the ranking after Real Madrid.
- Highest 5 year UEFA club coefficient ranking.
  - In 2003: 78.495 points (period 1998–2003)

=== Record wins before Süper Lig era (–1959) ===
- 20–0, Galatasaray – Vefa, 1925–1926, Istanbul Lig, 20 November 1925
- 14–1, Galatasaray – Anadolu Üsküdar 1908, 1914–1915, Istanbul Lig, 18 December 1914
- 12–1, Galatasaray – Topkapı SK, 1936–1937, Istanbul Lig, 27 December 1936
- 11–0, Galatasaray – Moda-Imogene Muhteliti, 1909–1910, Istanbul Lig, 21 January 1909
- 11–0, Galatasaray – UnkapanıFK, 1941–1942, Kupası, 21 December 1941
- 11–1, Galatasaray – Haliç İdman Yurdu, 1943–1944, Istanbul Kupası, 28 November 1943
- 10–0, Galatasaray – Süleymaniye SK, 1934–1935, Federasyon Kupası, 16 November 1934
- 10–0, Galatasaray – Üsküdar Anadolu SK, 1957–1958, Federasyon Kupası, 16 November 1957

== Player records ==
=== Appearance ===
==== Most appearances ====
Competitive matches only.

As of 30 May 2025

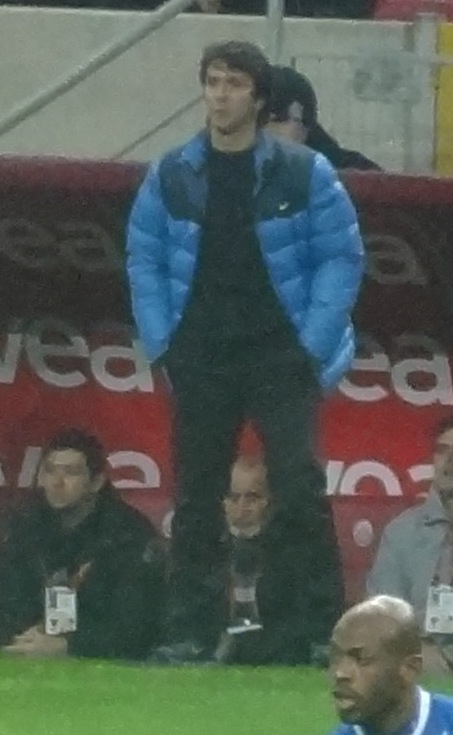
Bülent Korkmaz has the most caps for Galatasaray in competitive matches.

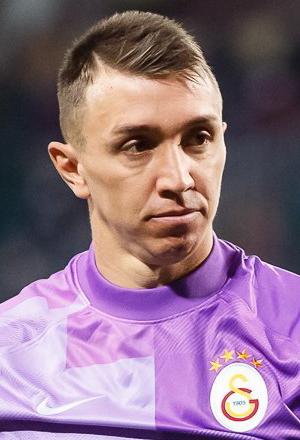
Fernando Muslera, recordholding foreign player with the most caps.

No.	Name	Years	League	Europe	Türkiye Kupası	Turkish Super Cup	Other	Total
1	(Turkey) Bülent Korkmaz	1987–2005	430	101	54	5	3	593
2	(Uruguay) Fernando Muslera	2011–2025	443	78	21	9	0	551
3	(Turkey) Hakan Şükür	1992–1995; 1995–2000; 2003–2008	393	81	56	6	0	536
4	(Turkey) Cüneyt Tanman	1973–1974; 1976–1991	401	21	73	4	5	504
5	(Turkey) Arif Erdem	1991–2000; 2001–2005	347	87	47	3	1	485
6	(Turkey) Sabri Sarıoğlu	2002–2017	354	57	61	3	0	475
7	(Turkey) Ergün Penbe	1994–2007	304	79	41	4	0	428
8	(Turkey) Turgay Şeren	1947–1967	369	18	18	0	2	407
9	(Turkey) Metin Oktay	1955–1961; 1962–1969	344	20	39	2	1	406
10	(Turkey) Fatih Terim	1974–1985	317	16	63	3	3	402

==== Süper Lig most appearances ====
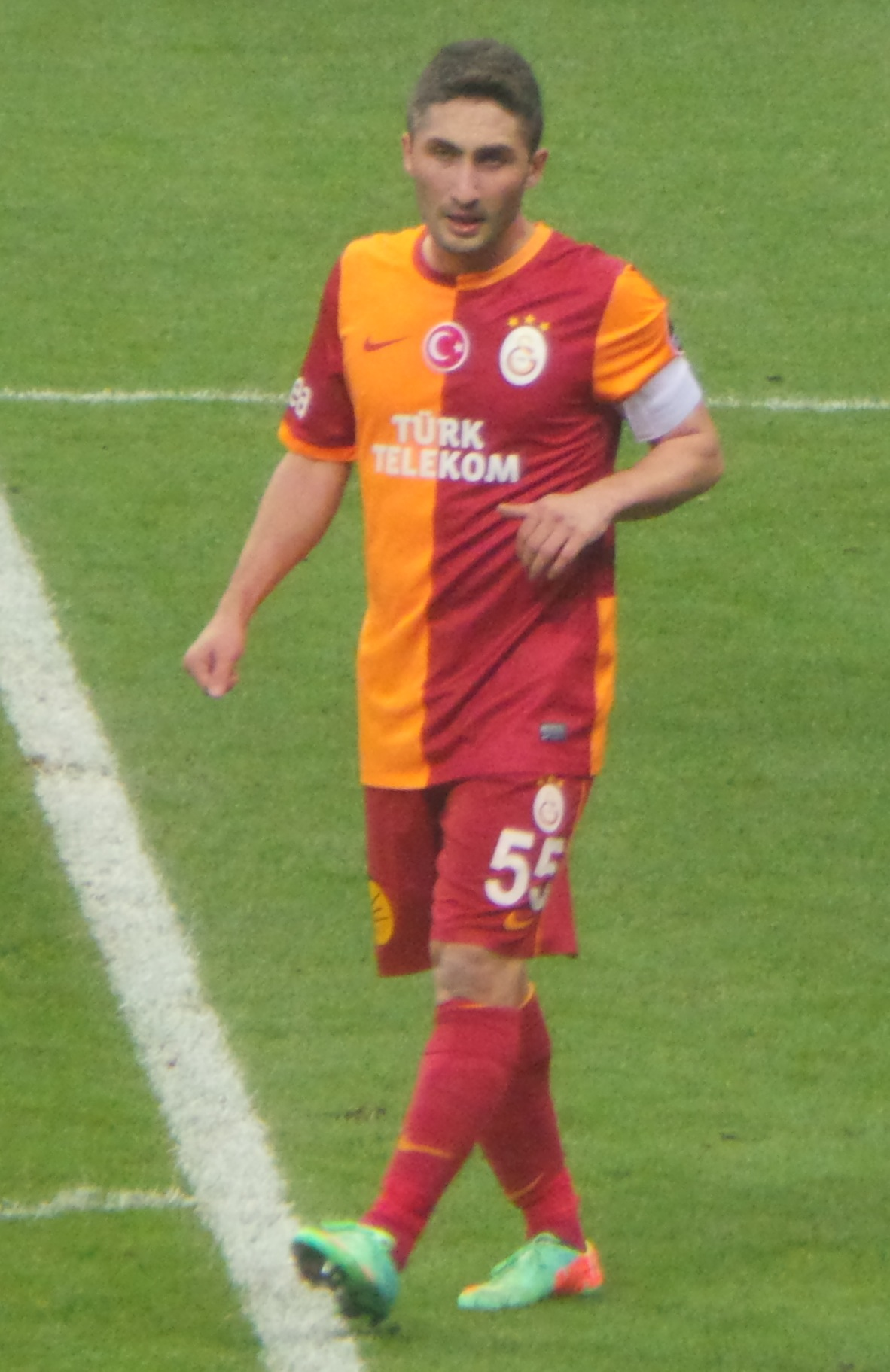
Sabri Sarıoğlu

As of 30 May 2025

#	Name	Career	Apps
1	(Uruguay) Fernando Muslera	2011–2025	443
2	(Turkey) Bülent Korkmaz	1987–2005	430
3	(Turkey) Cüneyt Tanman	1973–1974; 1976–1991	401
4	(Turkey) Hakan Şükür	1992–1995; 1995–2000; 2003–2008	393
5	(Turkey) Sabri Sarıoğlu	2002–2017	354
6	(Turkey) Arif Erdem	1991–2000; 2001–2005	347
7	(Turkey) Fatih Terim	1974–1985	317
8	(Turkey) Ergün Penbe	1994–2007	304
9	(Turkey) Gökmen Özdenak	1967–1980	297
10	(Turkey) Mehmet Oğuz	1967–1979	283

==== All-time most appearance (including friendlies) ====
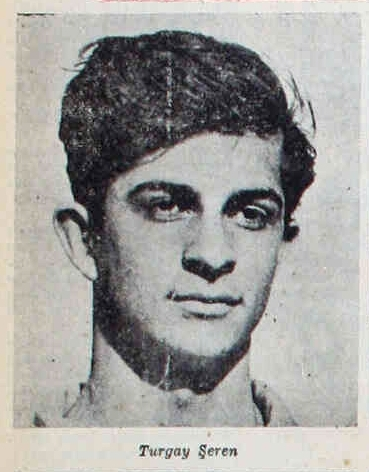
Turgay Şeren in 1950s

As of 30 May 2025

#	Name	Career	Apps
1	(Turkey) Turgay Şeren	1947–1967	631
2	(Turkey) Bülent Korkmaz	1987–2005	613
3	(Uruguay) Fernando Muslera	2011–2025	587
4	(Turkey) Hakan Şükür	1992–1995; 1995–2000; 2003–2008	552
5	(Turkey) Cüneyt Tanman	1973–1974; 1976–1991	535
6	(Turkey) Arif Erdem	1991–2000; 2001–2005	498
7	(Turkey) Metin Oktay	1955–1961; 1962–1969	491
8	(Turkey) Sabri Sarıoğlu	2002–2017	475
9	(Turkey) Ergün Penbe	1994–2007	438
10	(Turkey) Fatih Terim	1974–1985	434

==== International appearances ====
As of 22 February 2024

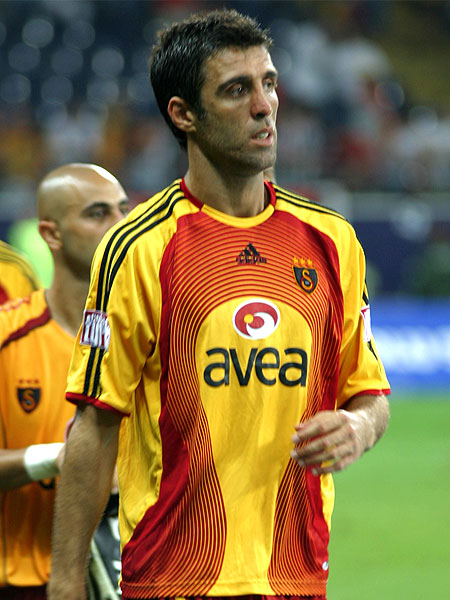
Hakan Şükür

Rank	Player	Years	UCL	UEL	UCWC	USC	Total	Ref.
1	(Turkey) Bülent Korkmaz	1985–2005	74	17	9	1	101	
2	(Turkey) Arif Erdem	1991–2000; 2001–2005	67	10	10	0	87	
3	(Turkey) Hakan Şükür	1992–1995; 1995–2000; 2003–2008	53	27	4	0	84	
4	(Turkey) Hasan Şaş	1998–2009	59	23	0	1	83	
5	(Turkey) Ergün Penbe	1994–2007	65	11	3	0	79	
6	(Uruguay) Fernando Muslera	2011–2025	53	23	0	0	76	
7	(Turkey) Suat Kaya	1986–1987; 1992–2003	52	11	1	1	65	
8	(Turkey) Hakan Ünsal	1994–2002; 2002–2005	49	7	4	1	61	
9	(Turkey) Okan Buruk	1991–2001; 2006–2008	38	16	3	1	58	
10	(Turkey) Sabri Sarıoğlu	2003–2017	26	31	0	0	57	
11	(Turkey) Ümit Davala	1996–2001; 2002–2003	43	6	4	1	54	
12	(Turkey) Tugay Kerimoğlu	1987–2000	35	10	8	0	53	
13	(Romania) Gheorghe Popescu	1997–2001	41	6	0	1	48	
14	(Turkey) Arda Turan	2004–2011; 2020–2022	11	36	0	0	47	
15	(Romania) Gheorghe Hagi	1996–2001	31	8	3	1	43	
16	(Turkey) Ayhan Akman	2001–2012	21	21	0	0	42	
17	(Colombia) Faryd Mondragón	2001–2007	37	4	0	0	41	
18	(Turkey) Ümit Karan	2001–2005; 2005–2009	25	15	0	0	40	
19	(Brazil) Cláudio Taffarel	1998–2001	28	9	0	1	38	

==== Captaincy ====
- Most matches as a captain:
- Most trophies lifted as captain:
- Oldest player to start as captain: **38 years and 348 days** – (Uruguay) Fernando Muslera, against İstanbul Başakşehir in 2024–25.
- Youngest player to start as captain: **17 years and 107 days** – (Turkey) Emin Bayram, against Ankaragücü in 2020–21.

==== Youngest first-team player ====
Competitive matches only.

Rank	Player	Age	Opponent	Competition	Date
1	(Turkey) Mehmet Leblebi	15 years, 67 days	Fenerbahçe	Istanbul Lig	9 March 1923
2	(Turkey) Rebii Erkal	15 years, 104 days	Beşiktaş	Istanbul Lig	14 January 1927
3	(Turkey) Necdet Cici	15 years, 243 days	Fenerbahçe	Gazi Büstü	31 August 1928
4	(Turkey) Berk Yıldız	16 years, 1 day	Adana Demirspor	Türkiye Kupası	10 January 2012
5	(Turkey) Mustafa Kapı	16 years, 137 days	Sivasspor	Süper Lig	23 December 2018
6	(Turkey) Servet Gökçen	16 years, 216 days	Gaziantepspor	Süper Lig	30 May 2003
7	(Turkey) Emin Bayram	16 years, 246 days	Tuzla SK	Türkiye Kupası	4 December 2019
8	(Turkey) Emre Belözoğlu	16 years, 252 days	Ankaragücü	Süper Lig	17 May 1997
9	(Turkey) Gündüz Kılıç	16 years, 320 days	Süleymaniye SK	Istanbul Lig	17 November 1935

- Youngest player to start for the club in Süper Lig: **17 years and 20 days** – (Turkey) Emre Belözoğlu, against Şekerspor in 1997–98.

==== Oldest first-team player ====
Competitive matches only.

Rank	Player	Age	Opponent	Competition	Date
1	(Uruguay) Fernando Muslera	38 years, 348 days	İstanbul Başakşehir	Süper Lig	30 May 2025
2	(Turkey) İbrahim Sokullu	38 years, 95 days	Trabzonspor	Türkiye Kupası	6 April 1983
3	(Belgium) Dries Mertens	38 years, 24 days	İstanbul Başakşehir	Süper Lig	30 May 2025
4	(France) Bafétimbi Gomis	37 years, 302 days	Fenerbahçe	Süper Lig	4 June 2023
5	(Turkey) Bülent Gürbüz	37 years, 98 days	Ankara Demirspor	Süper Lig	9 April 1967
6	(Turkey) Hakan Şükür	36 years, 252 days	Gençlerbirliği Oftaş	Süper Lig	10 May 2008
7	(Turkey) Bülent Korkmaz	36 years, 164 days	Ankaragücü	Süper Lig	7 May 2005
8	(Turkey) Emre Aşık	36 years, 154 days	Gençlerbirliği	Süper Lig	16 May 2010
9	(Romania) Gheorghe Hagi	36 years, 110 days	Trabzonspor	Süper Lig	26 May 2001
10	(Turkey) Ahmet Ceyhan	36 years, 76 days	Zonguldakspor	Süper Lig	12 April 1987

==== One-club men ====
Since the foundation of Galatasaray in 1905 there have been 23 players who have played their entire professional career Galatasaray SK. The first players to play at least 10 years just for Galatasaray were Celal İbrahim, Ahmet Robenson and Bekir Sıtkı Bircan who were also one of the founding members.

Name	From	To	Span (years)
(Turkey) Celal İbrahim	1905	1915	10
(Turkey) Ahmet Robenson	1905	1915	10
(Turkey) Bekir Sıtkı Bircan	1905	1915	10
(Turkey) Adnan İbrahim Pirioğlu	1908	1921	13
(Turkey) Nihat Bekdik	1916	1936	20
(Turkey) Suphi Batur	1916	1933	17
(Turkey) Burhan Atak	1920	1934	14
(Turkey) Muslihittin Peykoğlu	1921	1934	13
(Turkey) Mehmet Leblebi	1922	1936	14
(Turkey) Mithat Ertuğ	1923	1933	10
(Turkey) Ulvi Yenal	1923	1933	10
(Turkey) Kemal Faruki	1923	1934	11
(Turkey) Necdet Cici	1928	1941	16
(Turkey) Avni Kurgan	1929	1940	11
(Turkey) Mehmet Salim Şatıroğlu	1932	1949	17
(Turkey) Eşfak Aykaç	1936	1946	10
(Turkey) Muzaffer Tokaç	1942	1955	13
(Turkey) Necmi Erdoğdu	1944	1955	11
(Turkey) Rober Eryol	1947	1959	12
(Turkey) Turgay Şeren	1947	1967	20
(Turkey) Coşkun Özarı	1948	1960	12
(Turkey) Uğur Köken	1959	1973	14
(Turkey) Bülent Korkmaz	1987	2005	18

=== Top goalscorers ===
==== All competitions ====
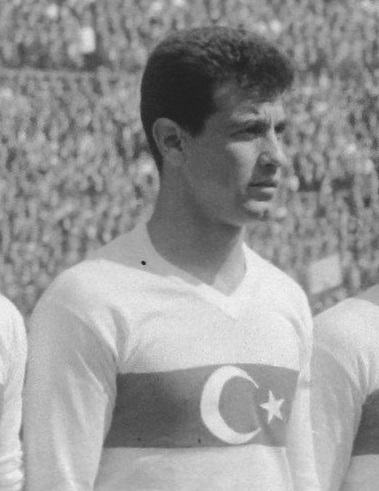
Oktay is the record goalscorer of all times for Galatasaray

As of 6 February 2016

Rank	Player	Years	League	Europe	Cup	Turkish Super Cup	Total	Ratio
1	(Turkey) Metin Oktay	1955–61; 1962–69	311 (344)	16 (20)	22 (39)	0 (2)	**349** (405)	0.86
2	(Turkey) Hakan Şükür	1992–95; 1995–00; 2003–08	228 (393)	37 (84)	19 (56)	5 (6)	**289** (539)	0.54
3	(Turkey) Gündüz Kılıç	1934–45; 1946–53	131 (182)	(-)	14 (11)	(-)	**145** (193)	0.75
4	(Turkey) Tanju Çolak	1987–91	116 (125)	6 (8)	14 (14)	1 (2)	**137** (149)	0.92
5	(Turkey) Arif Erdem	1991–00; 2001–05	105 (347)	16 (87)	13 (47)	0 (3)	**134** (484)	0.28
6	(Turkey) Gökmen Özdenak	1968–80	99 (297)	10 (16)	20 (60)	4 (3)	**133** (376)	0.35
7	(Turkey) Ümit Karan	2001–05; 2005–09	71 (170)	13 (37)	13 (27)	(-)	**97** (234)	0.41
8	(Turkey) Suat Mamat	1952–63	92 (263)	1 (8)	2 (7)	(-)	**95** (278)	0.34
9	(Turkey) Cemil Erlertürk	1938–44; 1945–52	87 (78)	(-)	3 (5)	(-)	**90** (83)	1.08
10	(Turkey) Reha Eken	1944–54	78 (125)	(-)	4 (6)	(-)	**82** (131)	0.63
11	(Turkey) Burak Yılmaz	2012–16	65 (105)	10 (25)	7 (9)	0 (2)	**82** (141)	0.58

- Most goals scored from a free kick in official competitions: **17** – (Socialist Federal Republic of Yugoslavia) Dževad Prekazi, 1985–1991
- Most goals scored in The Intercontinental Derby: **19** – (Turkey) Metin Oktay, 1955–61, 1962–69
- Most goals scored in one season in official competitions: **47** – (Turkey) Metin Oktay, 1962–63

==== International competitions ====
As of 3 November 2026

Numbers in brackets indicate appearances made. Ø = goals per game

Rank	Player	Years	UCL	UEL	UCWC	USC	Total	Ø	Ref.
1	(Turkey) Hakan Şükür	1992–1995; 1995–2000; 2003–2008	22 (53)	11 (27)	4 (4)	—	**37** (84)	0.44	
2	(Turkey) Metin Oktay	1955–1961; 1962–1969	13 (13)	—	3 (7)	—	**16** (20)	0.80	
3	(Turkey) Arif Erdem	1991–2000; 2000–2005	12 (67)	2 (10)	2 (10)	—	**16** (87)	0.18	
4	(Nigeria) **Victor Osimhen**	2024–	8 (11)	6 (7)	—	—	**14** (20)	0.7	
5	(Turkey) Ümit Karan	2001–2005; 2005–2009	9 (25)	4 (15)	—	—	**13** (40)	0.32	
6	(Czech Republic) Milan Baroš	2008–2013	—	12 (17)	—	—	**12** (17)	0.70	
7	(Democratic Republic of the Congo) Shabani Nonda	2007–2010	2 (2)	10 (16)	—	—	**12** (18)	0.66	
8	(Brazil) Mário Jardel	2000–2001	9 (16)	—	—	2 (1)	**11** (17)	0.64	
9	(Romania) Gheorghe Hagi	1996–2001	8 (31)	2 (8)	1 (3)	0 (1)	**11** (43)	0.25	
10	(Australia) Harry Kewell	2008–2011	0 (1)	10 (18)	—	—	**10** (19)	0.52	
11	(Turkey) Gökmen Özdenak	1968–1980	3 (9)	3 (7)	4 (4)	—	**10** (20)	0.50	
12	(Turkey) Burak Yılmaz	2012–2016	10 (25)	—	—	—	**10** (25)	0.40	
13	(Argentina) Mauro Icardi	2022–2026	5 (21)	3 (6)	—	—	**8** (27)	0.3	
14	(Turkey) **Yunus Akgün**	2018–	3 (19)	5 (9)	—	—	**8** (28)	0.29	
15	(Turkey) Arda Turan	2004–2011; 2020–2022	2 (11)	6 (36)	—	—	**8** (47)	0.17	
16	(Turkey) Ümit Davala	1996–2001; 2002–2003	6 (43)	1 (6)	0 (4)	0 (1)	**7** (54)	0.13	
17	(Turkey) Hasan Şaş	1996–2001; 2002–2003	6 (59)	1 (23)	—	0 (1)	**7** (82)	0.08	
18	(Turkey) Tanju Çolak	1987–1991	6 (8)	—	—	—	**6** (8)	0.75	

- Most goals scored in UEFA Champions League: **22** – (Turkey) Hakan Şükür, 1994–2007
- Most goals scored in UEFA Europa League: **12** – (Czech Republic) Milan Baroš, 2008–2011
- Most goals scored in UEFA Super Cup: **2** – (Brazil) Mário Jardel, 2000
- Most goals scored in UEFA Cup Winners' Cup: **4** – (Turkey) Hakan Şükür, 1996–1997, (Poland) Roman Kosecki, 1990–1992, (Turkey) Gökmen Özdenak, 1976–1977
- Most goals scored in the group stage of UEFA Champions League (until 2023–24 season): **13** – (Turkey) Hakan Şükür, 1994–2004
- Most goals scored in the league phase of UEFA Champions League (as of 2024–25 season): **7** – (Nigeria) Victor Osimhen, 2025–27
- Most goals scored in one UEFA Champions League season: **7** – (Nigeria) Victor Osimhen, 2025–26
- Most goals scored in one UEFA Champions League game: **3** – (Turkey) Burak Yılmaz against Cluj in 2012–13, (Nigeria) Victor Osimhen, against Ajax in 2025–26
- Most goals scored in one European competition season: **10** – (Turkey) Hakan Şükür, 1999–2000 (4 in UEFA Champions League and 6 in UEFA Cup)
- Longest scoring run European competitions: **12** goals, **8** games – (Nigeria) Victor Osimhen, 2024–2026
- Earliest goal scored in all European competitions: **2nd minute** – (Turkey) Yunus Akgün, against Lille in 2026–2027
- Latest goal scored in all European competitions: **106th minute** – (Nigeria) Victor Osimhen, against Juventus in 2025–2026
- Fastest hat-trick in UEFA Champions League: **19** minutes (59th, 66th, 78th) – (Nigeria) Victor Osimhen, against Ajax in 2025–26

==== Süper Lig ====
As of 24 August 2026

Rank	Player	Nationality	Years	Goals
1	Hakan Şükür	Turkey	1992–2000; 2003–2008	228
2	Metin Oktay	Turkey	1959–1969	200
3	Tanju Çolak	Turkey	1987–1991	116
4	Arif Erdem	Turkey	1991–2005	105
5	Gökmen Özdenak	Turkey	1967–1980	99
6	Ümit Karan	Turkey	2001–2009	71
7	Burak Yılmaz	Turkey	2012–2016	65
=	Mauro Icardi	Argentina	2022–2026	65
9	Ayhan Elmastaşoğlu	Turkey	1960–1972	62
10	Gheorghe Hagi	Romania	1996–2001	59

- Most goals scored in one Süper Lig season: **39** (Süper Lig Record) – (Turkey) Tanju Çolak, 1987–88 ^{European Golden Shoe winner}
- Longest scoring run in Süper Lig: **13** games (Süper Lig Record) – (Argentina) Mauro Icardi, 2023–24

==== By season ====
Here is a list of players who have finished as the club top scorers for Galatasaray by season. (All competitive matches)

Season	Name	Goals
1904–05	no off. matches	
1905–06	no off. matches	
1906–07	n/a	n/a
1907–08	n/a	n/a
1908–09	n/a	n/a
1909–10	n/a	n/a
1910–11	(Ottoman Empire) Celal İbrahim	4 + ?
1911–12	no off. matches	
1912–13	no off. matches	
1913–14	n/a	n/a
1914–15	n/a	n/a
1915–16	n/a	n/a
1916–17	n/a	n/a
1917–18	n/a	n/a
1918–19	n/a	n/a
1919–20	no off. matches	
1920–21	n/a	n/a
1921–22	n/a	n/a
1922–23	n/a	n/a
1923–24	n/a	n/a
1924–25	n/a	n/a
1925–26	(Turkey) Mehmet Leblebi	16
1926–27	(Turkey) Mehmet Leblebi	6
1927–28	no off. matches	
1928–29	(Turkey) Kemal Faruki	8
1929–30	(Turkey) Necdet Cici	8
1930–31	(Turkey) Kemal Faruki	13
1931–32	no off. matches	
1932–33	(Turkey) Mehmet Leblebi	7
1933–34	(Turkey) Fazıl Özkaptan	4
1934–35	(Turkey) Danyal Vuran	7+?
1935–36	(Turkey) Gündüz Kılıç	16
1936–37	(Turkey) Haşim Birkan (Turkey) Bülent Ediz	14
1937–38	(Turkey) Haşim Birkan	17
1938–39	(Turkey) Cemil Gürgen Erlertürk	17
1939–40	(Turkey) Cemil Gürgen Erlertürk	33
1940–41	(Turkey) Selahattin Almay	30
1941–42	(Turkey) Mustafa Gençsoy	20
1942–43	(Turkey) Cemil Gürgen Erlertürk	23
1943–44	(Turkey) Bülent Eken	13
1944–45	(Turkey) Bülent Eken (Turkey) Reha Eken	22
1945–46	(Turkey) Bülent Eken	6
1946–47	(Turkey) Reha Eken	19
1947–48	(Turkey) Gündüz Kılıç	5
1948–49	(Turkey) Reha Eken	11
1949–50	(Turkey) Gündüz Kılıç	11
1950–51	(Turkey) Naci Özkaya	9
1951–52	(Turkey) Gündüz Kılıç	5
1952–53	(Turkey) Reha Eken	9
1953–54	(Turkey) Kadri Aytaç	11

Season	Name	Goals
1954–55	(Turkey) Ali Beratlıgil	14
1955–56	(Turkey) Metin Oktay	19
1956–57	(Turkey) Metin Oktay	26
1957–58	(Turkey) Metin Oktay	29
1958–59	(Turkey) Metin Oktay	33
1959–60	(Turkey) Metin Oktay	33
1960–61	(Turkey) Metin Oktay	36
1961–62	(Turkey) Bahri Altıntabak	11
1962–63	(Turkey) Metin Oktay	47
1963–64	(Turkey) Metin Oktay	31
1964–65	(Turkey) Metin Oktay	23
1965–66	(Turkey) Metin Oktay	20
1966–67	(Turkey) Ayhan Elmastaşoğlu	16
1967–68	(Turkey) Metin Oktay	21
1968–69	(Turkey) Metin Oktay	21
1969–70	(Turkey) Gökmen Özdenak	11
1970–71	(Turkey) Gökmen Özdenak	14
1971–72	(Turkey) Gökmen Özdenak	12
1972–73	(Turkey) Mehmet Özgül	15
1973–74	(Turkey) Mehmet Özgül (Turkey) Mustafa Ergücü	6
1974–75	(Turkey) Mehmet Özgül	12
1975–76	(Turkey) Şevki Şenlen	22
1976–77	(Turkey) Gökmen Özdenak	17
1977–78	(Turkey) Gökmen Özdenak	19
1978–79	(Turkey) Gökmen Özdenak (Socialist Federal Republic of Yugoslavia) Ešref Jašarević	9
1979–80	(Turkey) Gökmen Özdenak	8
1980–81	(Turkey) Turgay İnal	6
1981–82	(Turkey) Ayhan Akbin (Socialist Federal Republic of Yugoslavia) Tarik Hodžić	8
1982–83	(Socialist Federal Republic of Yugoslavia) Mirsad Sejdić	15
1983–84	(Socialist Federal Republic of Yugoslavia) Tarik Hodžić	17
1984–85	(Turkey) Erdal Keser (Germany) Rüdiger Abramczik	10
1985–86	(Turkey) Erdal Keser	17
1986–87	(Turkey) Uğur Tütüneker	14
1987–88	(Turkey) Tanju Çolak	46
1988–89	(Turkey) Tanju Çolak	38
1989–90	(Turkey) Tanju Çolak	20
1990–91	(Turkey) Tanju Çolak	33
1991–92	(Poland) Roman Kosecki	20
1992–93	(Turkey) Hakan Şükür	24
1993–94	(Turkey) Hakan Şükür	20
1994–95	(Turkey) Saffet Sancaklı	29
1995–96	(Wales) Dean Saunders	21
1996–97	(Turkey) Hakan Şükür	46
1997–98	(Turkey) Hakan Şükür	34
1998–99	(Turkey) Hakan Şükür	26
1999–00	(Turkey) Hakan Şükür	25
2000–01	(Brazil) Mário Jardel	34
2001–02	(Turkey) Arif Erdem	23
2002–03	(Turkey) Ümit Karan	19
2003–04	(Turkey) Hakan Şükür	18

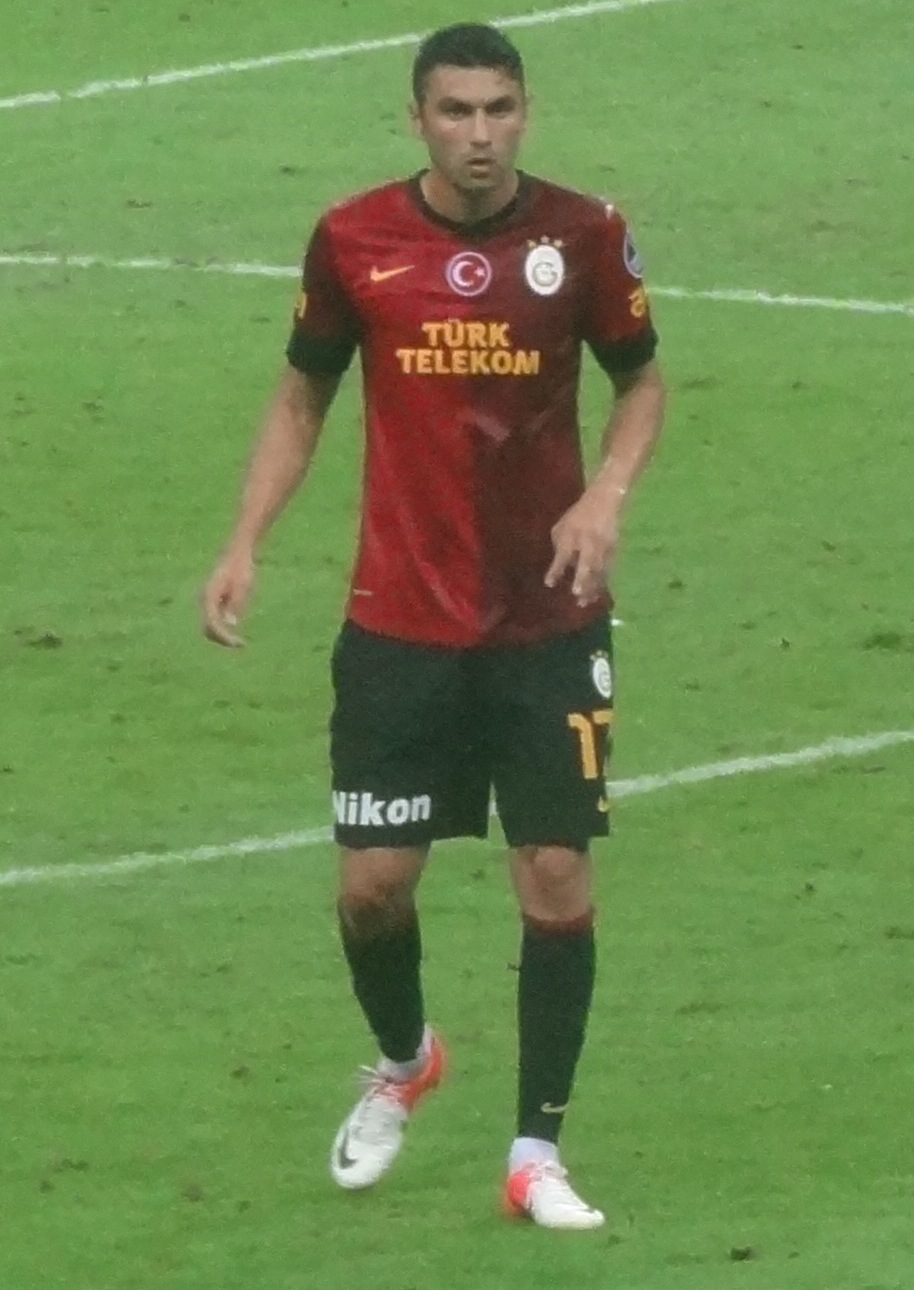
Burak Yılmaz, topscorer of 2012–13 season.

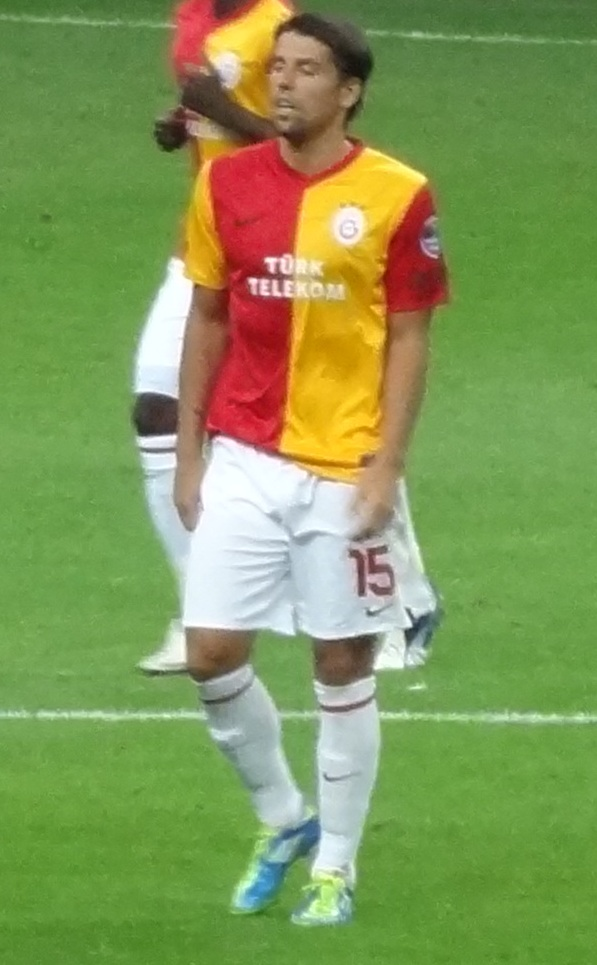
Milan Baroš, three times topscorer.

Season	Name	Goals
2004–05	(Turkey) Hakan Şükür	22
2005–06	(Turkey) Necati Ateş	22
2006–07	(Turkey) Ümit Karan	22
2007–08	(Turkey) Ümit Karan	17
2008–09	(Czech Republic) Milan Baroš	26
2009–10	(Czech Republic) Milan Baroš (Democratic Republic of the Congo) Shabani Nonda	16
2010–11	(Czech Republic) Milan Baroš	11
2011–12	(Turkey) Selçuk İnan	13
2012–13	(Turkey) Burak Yılmaz	32
2013–14	(Turkey) Burak Yılmaz	18
2014–15	(Turkey) Burak Yılmaz	22
2015–16	(Germany) Lukas Podolski	17
2016–17	(Germany) Lukas Podolski	17
2017–18	(France) Bafétimbi Gomis	32
2018–19	(Nigeria) Henry Onyekuru	16
2019–20	(Colombia) Radamel Falcao (Turkey) Adem Büyük	11
2020–21	(Senegal) Mbaye Diagne	11
2021–22	(Turkey) Kerem Aktürkoğlu	13
2022–23	(Argentina) Mauro Icardi	23
2023–24	(Argentina) Mauro Icardi	32
2024–25	(Nigeria) Victor Osimhen	37
2025–26	(Nigeria) Victor Osimhen	22

===== By player =====
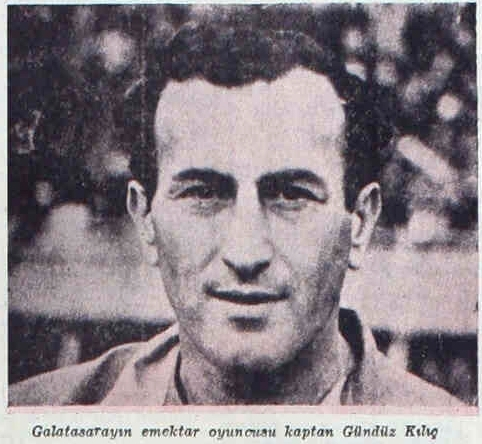
Gündüz Kılıç

Name	Titles	Years
(Turkey) Metin Oktay	12	1956, 1957, 1958, 1959, 1960, 1961, 1963, 1964, 1965, 1966, 1968, 1969
(Turkey) Hakan Şükür	8	1993, 1994, 1997, 1998, 1999, 2000, 2004, 2005
(Turkey) Gökmen Özdenak	7	1970, 1971, 1972, 1977, 1978, 1979, 1980
(Turkey) Gündüz Kılıç	4	1936, 1948, 1950, 1952
(Turkey) Reha Eken	4	1945, 1947, 1949, 1953
(Turkey) Tanju Çolak	4	1988, 1989, 1990, 1991
(Turkey) Mehmet Leblebi	3	1926, 1927, 1933
(Turkey) Cemil Gürgen Erlertürk	3	1939, 1940, 1943
(Turkey) Bülent Eken	3	1944, 1945, 1946
(Turkey) Mehmet Özgül	3	1973, 1974, 1975
(Turkey) Ümit Karan	3	2003, 2007, 2008
(Czech Republic) Milan Baroš	3	2009, 2010, 2011
(Turkey) Burak Yılmaz	3	2013, 2014, 2015
(Nigeria) **Victor Osimhen**	2	2025, 2026
(Argentina) Mauro Icardi	2	2023, 2024
(Turkey) Kemal Faruki	2	1929, 1931
(Turkey) Haşim Birkan	2	1937, 1938
(Socialist Federal Republic of Yugoslavia) Tarik Hodžić	2	1982, 1984
(Turkey) Erdal Keser	2	1985, 1986
(Germany) Lukas Podolski	2	2016, 2017
(Ottoman Empire) Celal İbrahim	1	1911
(Turkey) Necdet Cici	1	1930
(Turkey) Fazıl Özkaptan	1	1934
(Turkey) Danyal Vuran	1	1935
(Turkey) Bülent Ediz	1	1937
(Turkey) Selahattin Almay	1	1941
(Turkey) Mustafa Gençsoy	1	1942
(Turkey) Naci Özkaya	1	1951
(Turkey) Kadri Aytaç	1	1954
(Turkey) Ali Beratlıgil	1	1955
(Turkey) Bahri Altıntabak	1	1962
(Turkey) Ayhan Elmastaşoğlu	1	1967
(Turkey) Mustafa Ergücü	1	1974
(Turkey) Şevki Şenlen	1	1976
(Socialist Federal Republic of Yugoslavia) Ešref Jašarević	1	1979
(Turkey) Turgay Inan	1	1981
(Turkey) Ayhan Akbin	1	1982
(Socialist Federal Republic of Yugoslavia) Mirsad Sejdić	1	1983
(Germany) Rüdiger Abramczik	1	1985
(Turkey) Uğur Tütüneker	1	1987
(Poland) Roman Kosecki	1	1992
(Turkey) Saffet Sancaklı	1	1995
(Wales) Dean Saunders	1	1996
(Brazil) Mário Jardel	1	2001
(Turkey) Arif Erdem	1	2002
(Turkey) Necati Ateş	1	2006
(Democratic Republic of the Congo) Shabani Nonda	1	2010
(Turkey) Selçuk İnan	1	2012
(France) Bafétimbi Gomis	1	2018
(Nigeria) Henry Onyekuru	1	2019
(Colombia) Radamel Falcao	1	2020
(Turkey) Adem Büyük	1	2020
(Senegal) Mbaye Diagne	1	2021
(Turkey) Kerem Aktürkoğlu	1	2022

- **Most goals scored in one season (all competitions) for the club**

Rank	Player	Season	Goals
1	Metin Oktay	1962–1963	47
2	Tanju Çolak	1987–1988	46
3	Hakan Şükür	1996–1997	46

- **Most goals scored in a Süper Lig season**
  - 39, Tanju Çolak (1987-1988)
  - 38, Metin Oktay (1962-1963)
  - 38, Hakan Şükür (1996-1997)
  - 36, Metin Oktay (1960-1961)
  - 33, Metin Oktay (1959-1960)
  - 32, Mauro Icardi (2023–24)
  - 32, Hakan Şükür (1997-1998)
  - 31, Tanju Çolak (1990-1991)
  - 30, Cemil Erlertürk (1939-1940)

==== Scorers at Türkiye Kupası ====
As of 26 May 2019

Goals	Player name
22	(Turkey) Metin Oktay
20	(Turkey) Gökmen Özdenak
19	(Turkey) Hakan Şükür
14	(Turkey) Tanju Çolak
14	(Turkey) Sinan Gümüş
13	(Turkey) Arif Erdem
13	(Turkey) Ümit Karan
12	(Germany) Lukas Podolski
11	(Turkey) Tarık Kutver

- Most goals scored in same season: **10** – (Germany) Lukas Podolski, 2016–2017

==== Foreign goalscorers ====
Competitive matches only.

As of 26 October 2026

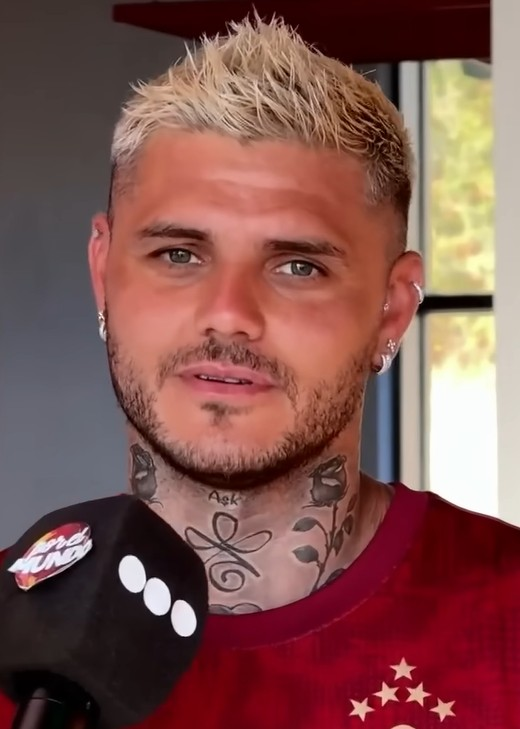
Mauro Icardi

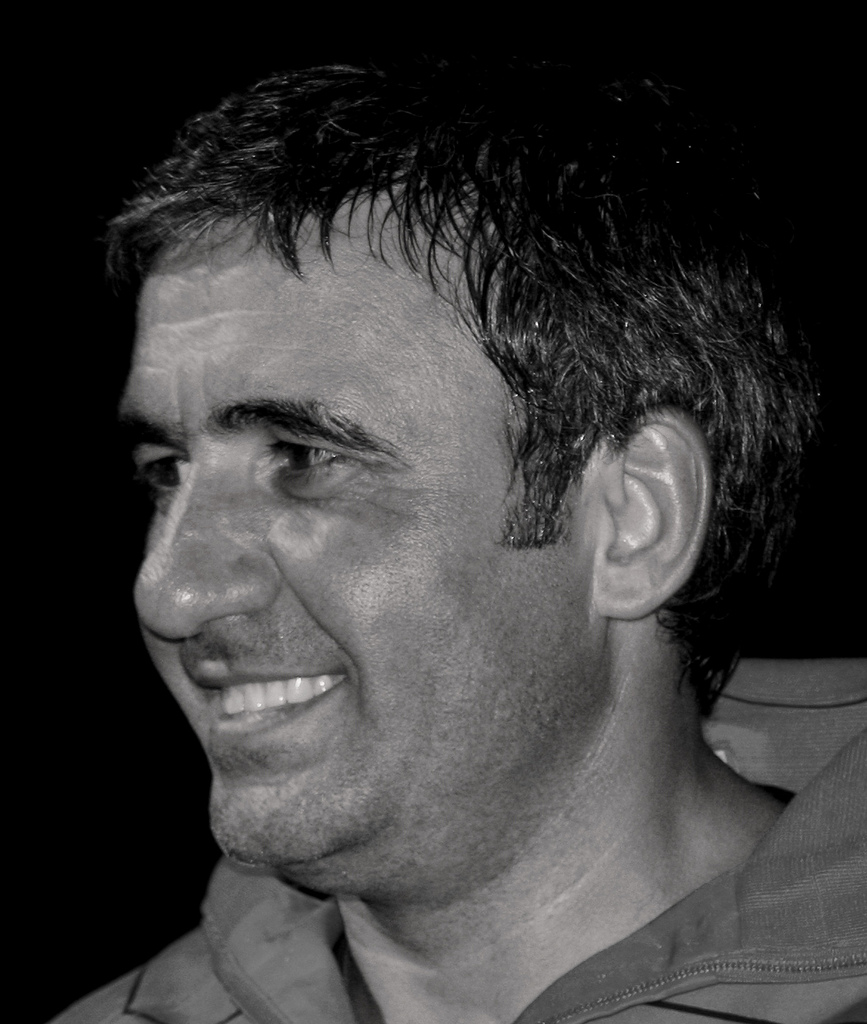
Gheorghe Hagi

Rank	Player	Years	Total Goals	Total Appearances	League Goals	League Appearances	Ratio	Ref.
1	(Argentina) Mauro Icardi	2022–2026	77	134	65	96	0.57	
2	(Romania) Gheorghe Hagi	1996–2001	72	192	59	132	0.38	
3	(Nigeria) **Victor Osimhen**	2024–	68	83	49	59	0.82	
4	(Czech Republic) Milan Baroš	2008–2013	62	117	48	88	0.53	
5	(France) Bafétimbi Gomis	2017–2018; 2022–2023	51	86	46	71	0.59	
6	(Socialist Federal Republic of Yugoslavia) Dževad Prekazi	1985–1991	49	247	38	179	0.2	
7	(Netherlands) Wesley Sneijder	2013–2017	46	175	35	124	0.26	
8	(Socialist Federal Republic of Yugoslavia) Mersad Kovačević	1986–1989	38	114	28	88	0.33	
9	(Democratic Republic of the Congo) Shabani Nonda	2007–2010	37	92	22	61	0.4	
10	(Brazil) Mário Jardel	2000–2001	34	43	22	24	0.79	
=	(Algeria) Sofiane Feghouli	2017–2022	34	162	25	126	0.21	

- Most goals scored in one season in all official competitions: **37** – (Nigeria) Victor Osimhen, 2024–25
- Most goals scored in Big Three derbies in Süper Lig: **10** goals – (Argentina) Mauro Icardi, 2022–24.

==== Youngest first-team goalscorer ====
Competitive matches only.

Rank	Player	Age	Opponent	Competition	Date	Goals
1	(Turkey) Rebii Erkal	15 years, 104 days	Beşiktaş	Istanbul Lig	14 January 1927	1
2	(Turkey) Necdet Cici	15 years, 243 days	Fenerbahçe	Gazi Büstü	31 August 1928	3
3	(Turkey) Gündüz Kılıç	16 years, 320 days	Süleymaniye SK	Istanbul Lig	17 November 1935	5

==== Oldest first-team goalscorer ====
Competitive matches only.

Rank	Player	Age	Opponent	Competition	Date	Goals
1	(Uruguay) Fernando Muslera	38 years, 336 days	Kayserispor	Süper Lig	18 May 2025	1
2	(Belgium) Dries Mertens	38 years, 24 days	İstanbul Başakşehir	Süper Lig	30 May 2025	1
3	(France) Bafétimbi Gomis	37 years, 160 days	Hatayspor	Süper Lig	13 January 2023	1
4	(Turkey) Hakan Şükür	36 years, 252 days	Gençlerbirliği Oftaş	Süper Lig	10 May 2008	1
5	(Romania) Gheorghe Hagi	36 years, 110 days	Trabzonspor	Süper Lig	26 May 2001	2

==== Highest scorer in a single game ====
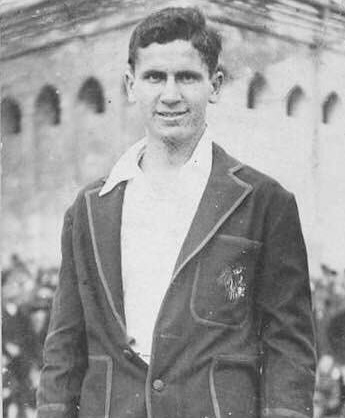
Mehmet Leblebi has scored 14 goals against Vefa in 1925–26 season.

Rank	Goals	Name	Opponent	Score	Season	Competition
1	14	(Turkey) Mehmet Leblebi	Vefa SK	20–0	1925–1926	Istanbul Lig
2	6	(Turkey) Gündüz Kılıç	Topkapı SK	12–1	1936–1937	Istanbul Lig
2	6	(Turkey) Cemil Erlertürk	Süleymaniye SSD	9–0	1939–1940	Istanbul Lig
2	6	(Turkey) Cemil Erlertürk	Topkapı SK	9–0	1939–1940	Istanbul Lig
2	6	(Turkey) Cemil Erlertürk	Taksim SK	8–0	1942–1943	Istanbul Lig
3	5	(Turkey) Gündüz Kılıç	Süleymaniye SSD	10–1	1935–1936	Istanbul Lig
3	5	(Turkey) Gündüz Kılıç	Beşiktaş JK	2–9	1939–1940	Istanbul Lig
3	5	(Turkey) Hikmet Ebcim	Haliç İdman Yurdu	11–1	1943–1944	Istanbul Kupası
3	5	(Turkey) Metin Oktay	Üsküdar Anadolu SK	10–0	1957–1958	Federasyon Kupası
3	5	(Turkey) Metin Oktay	Altınordu S.K.	8–0	1959–1960	Süper Lig
3	5	(Turkey) Tanju Çolak	Adanaspor	5–0	1989–1990	Süper Lig
3	5	(Turkey) Tanju Çolak	Aydınspor	6–2	1990–1991	Süper Lig
3	5	(Turkey) Erdal Keser	Altay SK	8–1	1985–1986	Başbakanlık Kupası
3	5	(Brazil) Mário Jardel	Erzurumspor	7–0	2000–2001	Süper Lig
3	5	(Germany) Lukas Podolski	Erzincanspor	6–2	2016–2017	Türkiye Kupası

==== Hat-tricks ====
Competitive matches only.

As of 29 November 2015.

Most Hat-tricks
No.	Name	League	Europe	Cup	Turkish Super Cup	Total
1	(Turkey) Metin Oktay	28	1	1	0	30
2	(Turkey) Hakan Şükür	15	1	1	1	18
3	(Turkey) Cemil Erlertürk	14	0	0	0	14
4	(Turkey) Gündüz Kılıç	11	0	0	0	11
5	(Turkey) Tanju Çolak	9	1	0	0	10

==== All-time leading goalscorers ====
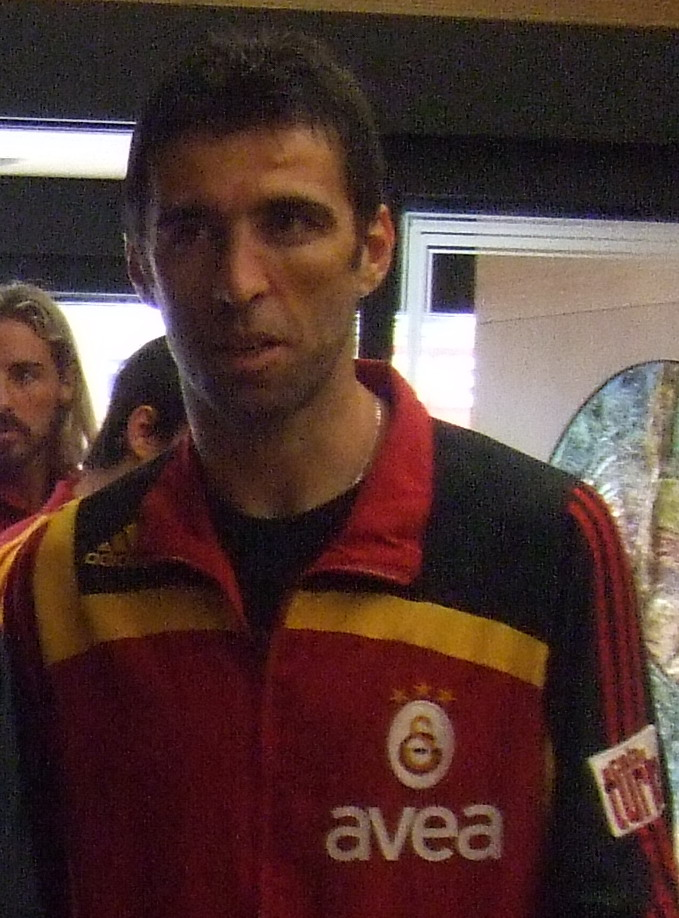
Hakan Şükür

Including friendlies and other tournaments (al least 100 goals)

#	Name	Career	Goals	Apps	Par
1	(Turkey) Metin Oktay	1955–1961; 1962–1969	586	497	1.18
2	(Turkey) Hakan Şükür	1992–1995; 1995–2000; 2003–2008	292	552	0.53
3	(Turkey) Gündüz Kılıç	1934–1945; 1946–1953	147	198	0.74
4	(Turkey) Tanju Çolak	1987–1991	145	157	0.92
5	(Turkey) Gökmen Özdenak	1968–1980	140	406	0.34
6	(Turkey) Arif Erdem	1991–2000; 2001–2005	138	499	0.28

=== Goalkeepers ===
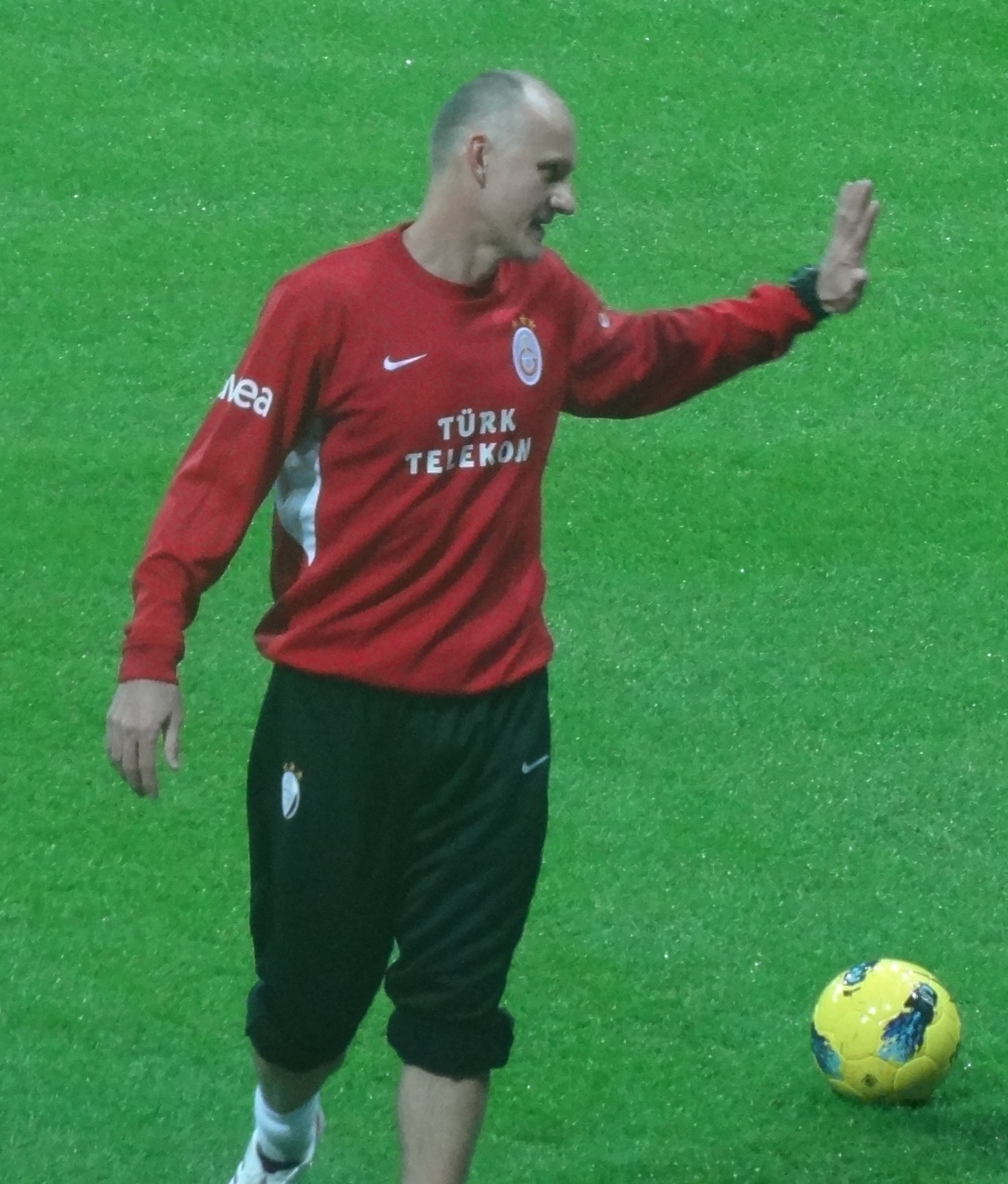
Taffarel with Galatasaray in 2012

- Most clean sheets in a Süper Lig season:

#	Name	Season	Clean sheets	Matches	Ratio
1	(Uruguay) Fernando Muslera	2023–24	17	37	0.46
2	(Uruguay) Fernando Muslera	2022–23	16	32	0.5
3	(Uruguay) Fernando Muslera	2011–12	16	32	0.5
4	(Brazil) Cláudio Taffarel	1999–00	15	30	0.5
4	(Brazil) Cláudio Taffarel	1998–99	15	32	0.47
5	(Colombia) Faryd Mondragón	2004–05	15	34	0.44

- Most clean sheets in Süper Lig:
  - **399** Süper Lig games played by (Uruguay) Fernando Muslera of which he maintained a clean sheet in **154** games, or **30.8%** of the matches.

=== Award winners ===
Several players have won individual and international honours whilst on the books of Galatasaray:
European Golden Boot

- (Turkey) Tanju Çolak – 1987–88

FIFA 100

- (Turkey) Emre Belözoğlu
- (Romania) Gheorghe Hagi

The 100 Greatest Players of the 20th century

- (Romania) Gheorghe Hagi – #25

UEFA Jubilee Awards (Golden Players)

- (Romania) Gheorghe Hagi
- (Turkey) Hakan Şükür

Golden Foot

- (Ivory Coast) Didier Drogba – 2013

=== Trophies ===
Galatasaray players having won the most trophies. Official competitions only. Active players in bold.

As of 18 May 2025

Rank	Player	SL	TK	TSK	UEL	USC	Total
1	(Turkey) Bülent Korkmaz	8	6	5	1	1	21
2	(Uruguay) Fernando Muslera	8	5	6	–	–	19
3	(Turkey) Suat Kaya	8	4	3	1	1	17
3	(Turkey) Hakan Şükür	8	5	3	1	–	17
5	(Turkey) Okan Buruk	7	4	3	1	1	16
5	(Turkey) Arif Erdem	7	5	3	1	–	16
5	(Turkey) Tugay Kerimoğlu	6	4	6	–	–	16
8	(Turkey) Sabri Sarıoğlu	6	4	5	–	–	15
9	(Turkey) Ergün Penbe	6	4	2	1	1	14
9	(Turkey) Selçuk İnan	5	4	5	–	–	14

=== Transfers ===
==== Highest transfer fees paid ====
Rank	Player	Fee (€)	From	Year	Ref.
1	(Nigeria) Victor Osimhen	75,000,000	(Italy) Napoli	2025	
2	(Portugal) Rafael Leão	38,000,000	(Italy) AC Milan	2026	
3	(Turkey) Uğurcan Çakır	33,000,000	(Turkey) Trabzonspor	2025	
4	(Ivory Coast) Wilfried Singo	30,769,230	(France) AS Monaco	2025	
5	(Russia) Aleksey Batrakov	25,000,000	(Russia) Lokomotiv Moscow	2026	
6	(Brazil) Gabriel Sara	18,000,000	(England) Norwich City	2024	
7	(Brazil) Mário Jardel	16,000,000	(Portugal) Porto	2000	
8	(Italy) Nicolò Zaniolo	15,000,000	(Italy) Roma	2023	
9	(Uruguay) Fernando Muslera	11,750,000	(Italy) Lazio / (Uruguay) Montevideo Wanderers	2011	
10	(Argentina) Mauro Icardi	10,000,000	(France) Paris Saint-Germain	2023	
10	(Portugal) Bruma	10,000,000	(Portugal) Sporting CP	2013	
10	(Senegal) Mbaye Diagne	10,000,000	(Turkey) Kasımpaşa S.K.	2018	

==== Highest transfer fees received ====
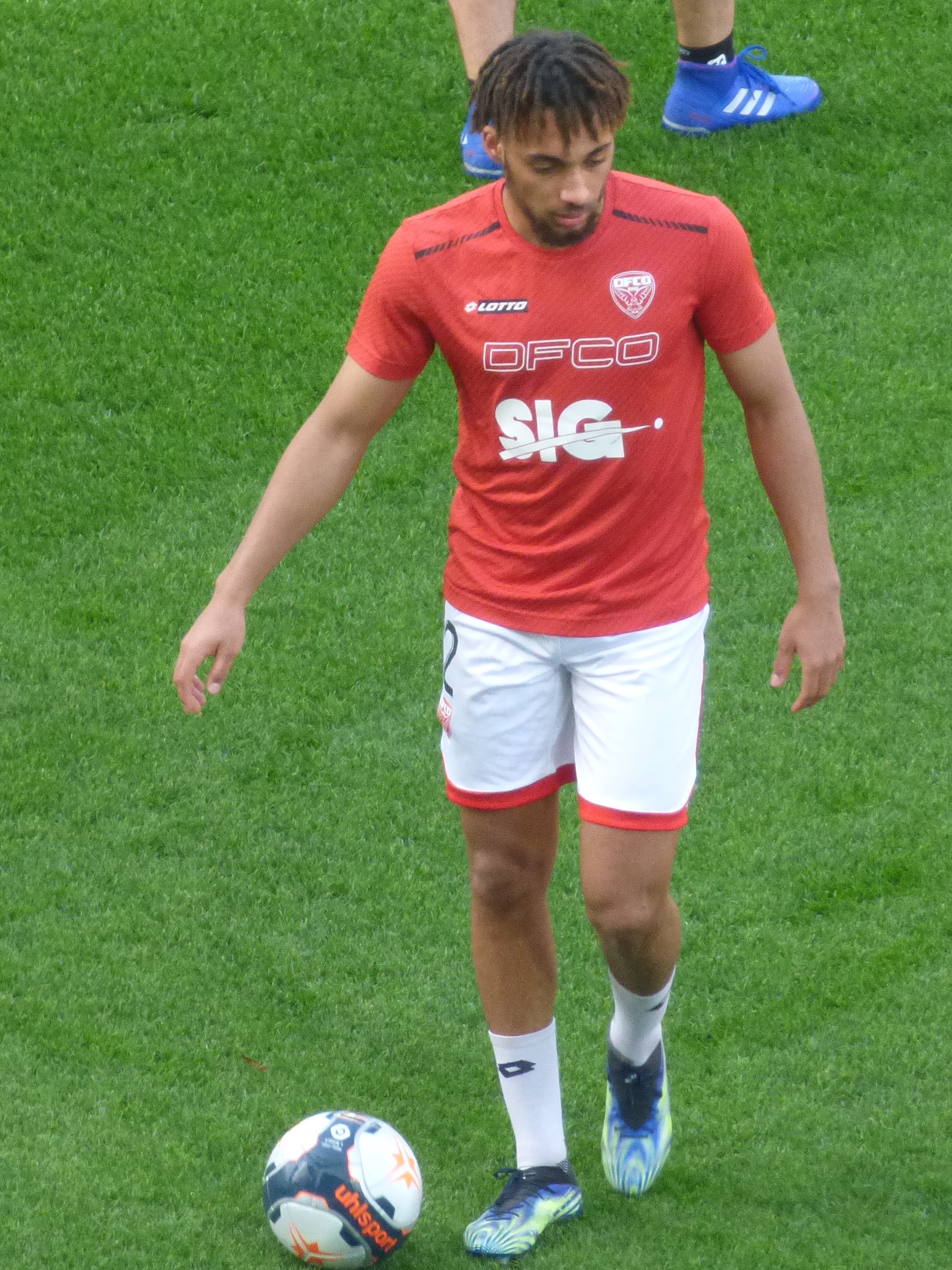
Sacha Boey

Rank	Name	Fee (€)	To	Year	Ref.
1	(France) Sacha Boey	30,000,000	(Germany) Bayern Munich	2024	
2	(Senegal) Badou Ndiaye	16,000,000	(England) Stoke City	2018	
3	(Portugal) Bruma	15,000,000	(Germany) RB Leipzig	2017	
3	(Brazil) Marcão	15,000,000	(Spain) Sevilla	2022	
4	(Turkey) Kerem Aktürkoğlu	12,000,000	(Portugal) Benfica	2024	
4	(Turkey) Arda Turan	12,000,000	(Spain) Atlético Madrid	2011	
5	(Turkey) Ozan Kabak	11,000,000	(Germany) VfB Stuttgart	2019	
6	(Cape Verde) Garry Rodrigues	9,000,000	(Saudi Arabia) Al-Ittihad	2019	
7	(Turkey) Hakan Şükür	8,200,000	(Italy) Inter Milan	2000	
8	(Ivory Coast) Kader Keïta	8,150,000	(Saudi Arabia) Al-Sadd	2010	
9	(Turkey) Burak Yılmaz	8,000,000	(China) Beijing Guoan	2016	
10	(Romania) Adrian Ilie	7,000,000	(Spain) Valencia	1998	

== Manager records ==
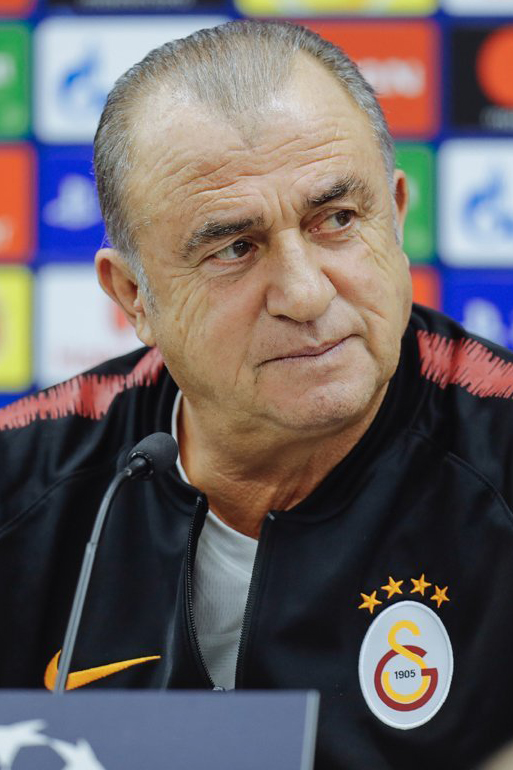
Terim, winning coach of the UEFA Cup 1999-2000.

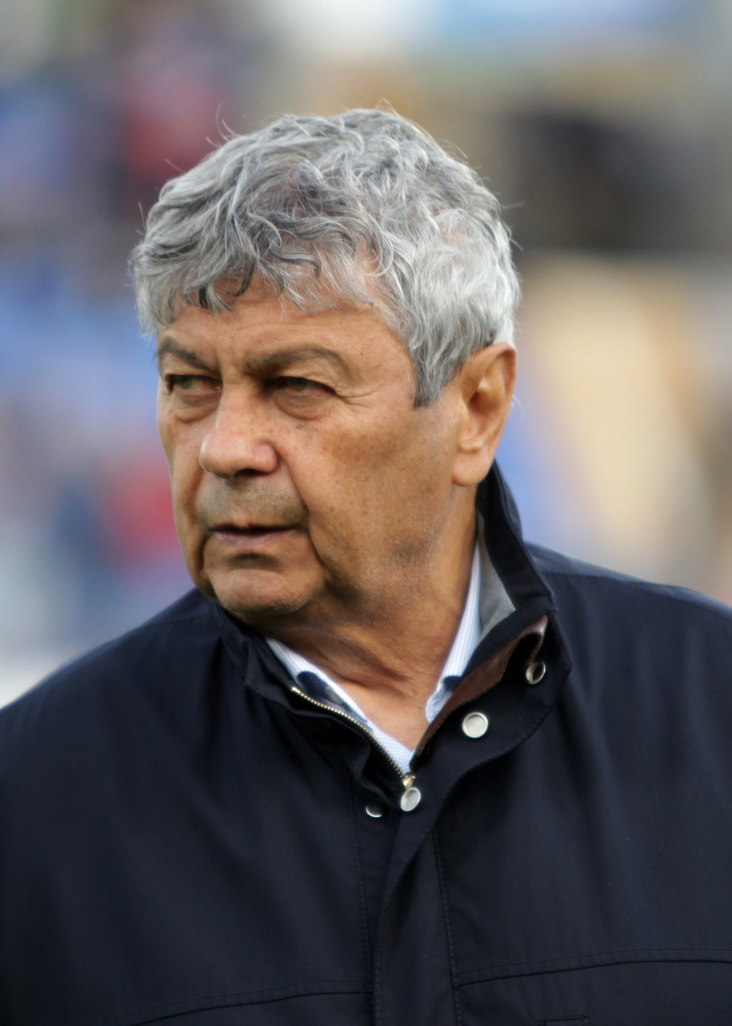
Lucescu, winning coach of the UEFA Super Cup 2000.

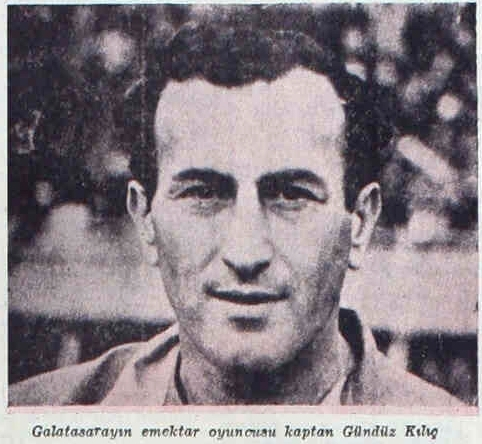
Gündüz Kılıç

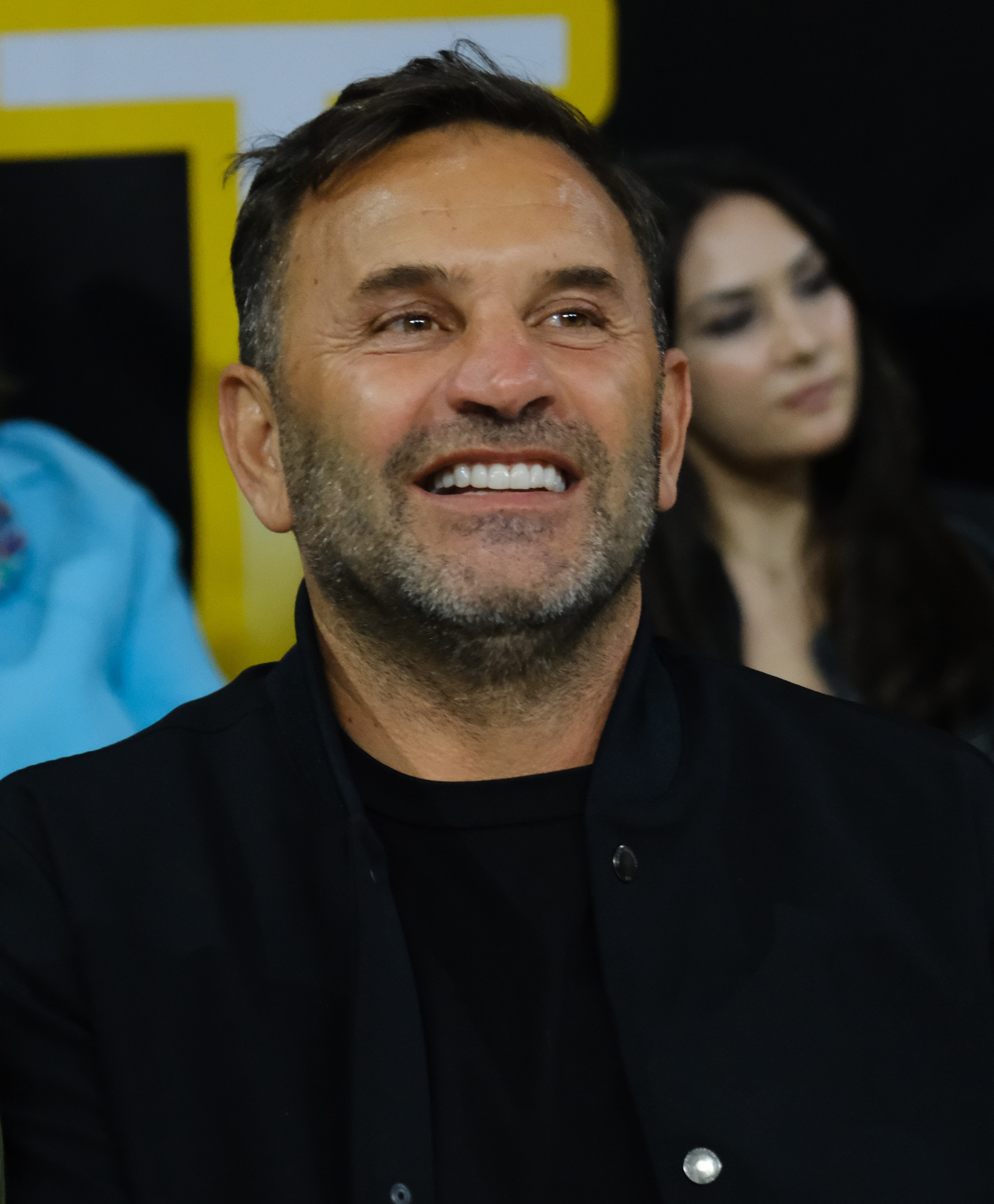
Okan Buruk

- Most titles: 17 – (Turkey) Fatih Terim
- Most titles in a season: 3 – (Turkey) Fatih Terim (1999–00)
- Most international club competition titles: 1 – (Turkey) Fatih Terim, (Romania) Mircea Lucescu
- Most doubles: 3 – (Turkey) Fatih Terim (Süper Lig and Türkiye Kupası) (1998–99, 1999–00, 2018–19)
- Most seasons managed: 14 – (Turkey) Fatih Terim (1996–00, 2002–04, 2011–13, 2017–22)
- Most consecutive seasons managed:
  - 5 – (Turkey) Fatih Terim (2017–22)
  - 5 – (Turkey) Okan Buruk (2022–27)
- Most competitive matches managed: 571 – (Turkey) Fatih Terim
- Most competitive wins in domestic club competitions: 333 – (Turkey) Fatih Terim
- Most consecutive home wins in Süper Lig: 20 – (Turkey) Okan Buruk
- Most consecutive away wins in Süper Lig: 13 – (Turkey) Okan Buruk
- Most consecutive wins in all domestic club competitions: 17 – (Turkey) Okan Buruk
- Most Süper Lig titles: 8 – (Turkey) Fatih Terim
- Most consecutive Süper Lig titles: 4
  - (Turkey) Fatih Terim (1996–97, 1997–98, 1998–99, 1999–00)
  - (Turkey) Okan Buruk (2022–23, 2023–24, 2024–25, 2025–26)
- Most Türkiye Kupası titles: 3 – (Turkey) Fatih Terim, (Turkey) Gündüz Kılıç
- Most TFF Süper Kupa titles: (Note: Includes also Presidential Cup titles.) 5 – (Turkey) Fatih Terim
- Most matches in international club competitions: 93 – (Turkey) Fatih Terim
- Most consecutive home wins in UEFA Europa League: (Note: Includes also UEFA Cup era and qualifying rounds.) 3 – (Turkey) Okan Buruk (2023–24, 2024–25)
- Most consecutive wins in UEFA Champions League: 3 – (Turkey) Fatih Terim (2012–13)
- Most consecutive wins in all international club competitions: 5 – (Turkey) Okan Buruk (2023–24)
- Highest win percentage (at least one season in charge): 80% (Note: Has won 119 out of 149 matches in Süper Lig.) – (Turkey) Okan Buruk (2022–26)
- Lowest win percentage (at least one season in charge): 31.71% – (England) Malcolm Allison (1976–77)

== Attendances ==
=== Records ===
Attendance Records
Rank	Attendance	Stadium	Date	Game	Information
1	79,414	Atatürk Olympic Stadium	31 July 2002	Galatasaray – Olympiacos	Highest attendance in Turkey
2	71,334	Atatürk Olympic Stadium	21 September 2003	Galatasaray – Fenerbahçe	Highest Kıtalar Arası Derbi and Süper Lig attendance
3	71,230	Atatürk Olympic Stadium	12 September 2006	Galatasaray – Bordeaux	Highest attendance in a European cup match
4	66,701	İzmir Atatürk Stadium	21 January 1973	Galatasaray – Fenerbahçe	Highest attendance outside of Istanbul
5	66,300	Atatürk Olympic Stadium	13 August 2003	Galatasaray – CSKA Moscow	
6	62,620	Atatürk Olympic Stadium	9 August 2003	Galatasaray – Diyarbakırspor	
7	61,810	İzmir Atatürk Stadium	24 August 1994	Galatasaray – Avenir Beggen	
8	60,000	Müngersdorfer Stadion	15 March 1989	Galatasaray – Monaco	1988–89 European Cup quarter final Highest attendance outside of Turkey
9	58,617	Atatürk Olympic Stadium	30 September 2003	Galatasaray – Real Sociedad	
10	53,755	Rams Park	19 May 2024	Galatasaray – Fenerbahçe	Highest attendance in Rams Park.

=== Season tickets and average attendance ===
Season	Sold season tickets	Average league attendance
2011 (just 2nd half)	20,000	29,887
2011–2012	27,900	34,685
2012–2013	47,200	43,262
2013–2014	46,250*	40,094
2014–2015	43,108	26,193
2015–2016	39,849	18,996
2016–2017	22,167	21,751
2017–2018	41,167	41,076
2018–2019	46,716	36,439
2019–2020	47,729	35,231
2020–2021	N/A due to COVID-19 pandemic	
2021–2022	N/A due to COVID-19 pandemic	21,425
2022–2023	40,105	45,516
2023–2024	42,000**	43,251
2024–2025	41,614	44,525
2025–2026	42,000	45,432
2026–2027	42,649	48,491 (after six matches)

*Stopped at 46,250. Demand was 65,000.

== See also ==
- Football records and statistics in Turkey
- List of Süper Lig top scorers
- European Cup and UEFA Champions League records and statistics
- UEFA Cup and Europa League records and statistics
- European association football club records and statistics
