= 1948–49 Galatasaray S.K. season =

Galatasaray
1948–49 season
- President: (Turkey) Suphi Batur
- Manager: (England) Pat Molloy
- Stadium: Dolmabahçe Stadı
- Istanbul Lig: 1st
- Top goalscorer: League: Reha Eken (11); All: Reha Eken (11)
Home colours	Away colours

The 1948–49 season was Galatasaray SK's 45th in existence and the club's 37th consecutive season in the Istanbul Football League.

== Squad statistics ==
No.	Pos.	Name	IFL		Total	
No.	Pos.	Name	Apps	Goals	Apps	Goals
-	GK	(Turkey) Osman İncili	5	0	5	0
-	GK	(Turkey) Erdoğan Atlıoğlu	9	0	9	0
-	DF	(Turkey) Bülent Eken	14	1	14	1
-	DF	(Turkey) Koçis Kandidis	3	2	3	2
-	DF	(Turkey) Naci Özkaya	13	0	13	0
-	DF	(Turkey) Fazıl Göknar	1	0	1	0
-	DF	(Turkey) Necmi Erdoğdu	9	0	9	0
-	DF	(Turkey) Salim Şatıroğlu	1	0	1	0
-	MF	(Turkey) Musa Sezer	14	0	14	0
-	MF	(Turkey) Doğan Koloğlu	2	0	2	0
-	FW	(Turkey) Süreyya Görkey	1	0	1	0
-	FW	(Turkey) Halis Etçi	5	1	5	1
-	FW	(Turkey) İsfendiyar Açıksöz	14	8	14	8
-	FW	(Turkey) Reha Eken	14	11	14	11
-	FW	(Turkey) Muzaffer Tokaç	11	4	11	4
-	FW	(Turkey) Gündüz Kılıç	13	8	13	8
-	FW	(Turkey) Orhan Canpolat	14	4	14	4

== Competitions ==
=== Istanbul Football League ===
==== Classification ====
Pos	Team	Pld	W	D	L	GF	GA	GD	Pts
1	Galatasaray SK	14	12	1	1	39	11	+28	39
2	Beşiktaş JK	14	11	1	2	28	11	+17	37
3	Fenerbahçe SK	14	7	2	5	25	17	+8	30
4	Vefa SK	14	4	5	5	17	20	−3	27
5	Beykoz 1908 S.K.D.	14	3	4	7	17	32	−15	23 (Note: 1 point deducted?)
6	İstanbulspor	14	2	5	7	16	24	−8	23
7	Kasımpaşa SK	14	2	4	8	22	34	−12	22
8	Küçükçekmece SK	14	3	2	9	14	29	−15	22

==== Results summary ====
Overall								Home						Away					
Pld	W	D	L	GF	GA	GD	Pts	W	D	L	GF	GA	GD	W	D	L	GF	GA	GD
14	12	1	1	39	11	+28	37	6	1	0	20	3	+17	6	0	1	19	8	+11

Last updated: September 6, 2011.
Source: Istanbul Futbol Lig

==== Results by round ====
Round	1	2	3	4	5	6	7	8	9	10	11	12	13	14
Ground	H	A	A	H	H	A	A	A	H	H	A	A	H	H
Result	W	W	L	W	W	W	W	W	D	W	W	W	W	W

Source: Istanbul Futbol Lig
A = Away; H = Home; W = Win; D = Draw; L = Loss

==== Matches ====
Kick-off listed in local time (EEST)

1948-10-09
13:30

Galatasaray SK	7 – 1	Beykoz 1908 S.K.D.
İsfendiyar 15', 89'; Reha 32', 51'; Orhan 40'; Gündüz 54', 83'	(Report)	İdris 84'

İnönü Stadium, Istanbul
Referee: Feridun Kılıç

1948-10-17
15:00

Vefa SK	1 – 4	Galatasaray SK
Fehmi 4'	(Report)	Reha 30'; Gündüz 66'; Orhan 74'; Halis 76'

İnönü Stadium, Istanbul
Referee: Mustafa Güventürk

1948-10-24
15:00

Beşiktaş JK	2 – 0	Galatasaray SK
Şevket 71'; Şükrü 89'	(Report)

İnönü Stadium, Istanbul
Referee: Şazi Tezcan

1948-10-30
15:00

Galatasaray SK	5 – 0	Kasımpaşa SK
Reha 8', 55'; Gündüz 35'; İsfendiyar 84'; Bülent 90'	(Report)

İnönü Stadium, Istanbul
Referee: Samih Duransoy

1948-11-06
12:30

Galatasaray SK	2 – 1	İstanbulspor
Reha 10'; İsfendiyar 39'	(Report)	Erdoğan 87'

İnönü Stadium, Istanbul
Referee: Halis Falay

1948-11-14
14:30

Fenerbahçe SK	1 – 2	Galatasaray SK
Ahmet 85'	(Report)	İsfendiyar 40'; Reha 44'

İnönü Stadium, Istanbul
Referee: Şekip Akduman

1948-11-21
12:30

Küçükçekmece SK	1 – 3	Galatasaray SK
Zekeriya 21'	(Report)	Gündüz 20', 64'; Reha 28'

İnönü Stadium, Istanbul
Referee: Samih Duransoy

1949-01-15
14:30

Beykoz 1908 S.K.D.	1 – 5	Galatasaray SK
Fahrettin 44'	(Report)	Muzaffer 50', 79'; Gündüz 53'; İsfendiyar 64', 86'

İnönü Stadium, Istanbul
Referee: Feridun Kılıç

1949-02-20
15:00

Galatasaray SK	1 – 1	Vefa SK
Koçis 32'	(Report)	İsmet 3'

İnönü Stadium, Istanbul
Referee: Feridun Kılıç

1949-02-27
15:30

Galatasaray SK	1 – 1	Beşiktaş JK
Muzaffer 67'	(Report)

İnönü Stadium, Istanbul
Referee: Samih Duransoy

1949-03-05
14:30

Kasımpaşa SK	1 – 2	Galatasaray SK
Tayyar 35'	(Report)	Reha 25'; Koçis 48'

İnönü Stadium, Istanbul
Referee: Şekip Akduman

1949-04-02
16:00

İstanbulspor	1 – 3	Galatasaray SK
Şeref 51' (p)	(Report)	İsfendiyar 7'; Orhan 38'; Reha 47'

İnönü Stadium, Istanbul
Referee: Şekip Akduman

1949-04-10
17:00

Galatasaray SK	1 – 0	Fenerbahçe SK
Reha 63'	(Report)

İnönü Stadium, Istanbul
Referee: Feridun Kılıç

1949-04-16
17:00

Galatasaray SK	3 – 0	Küçükçekmece SK
Gündüz 38'; Orhan 63'; Muzaffer 76'	(Report)

İnönü Stadium, Istanbul
Referee: Şekip Akduman
