= 1945–46 Galatasaray S.K. season =

Galatasaray
1945–46 season
- President: (Turkey) Muslihittin Peykoğlu
- Manager: (Turkey) Miço Dimitriyadis
- Stadium: Ali Sami Yen Stadı
- Istanbul Lig: 4th
- Istanbul Kupası: Semi final
- Top goalscorer: League: Şahap Turgan (4); Bülent Eken (4); All: Bülent Eken (6)
Home colours

The 1945–46 season was Galatasaray SK's 42nd in existence and the club's 34th consecutive season in the Istanbul Football League.

== Squad statistics ==
No.	Pos.	Name	IFL		IFK		Total	
No.	Pos.	Name	Apps	Goals	Apps	Goals	Apps	Goals
-	GK	(Turkey) Osman İncili	3	0	n/a	n/a	3	0
-	GK	(Turkey) Erdoğan Atlıoğlu	11	0	n/a	n/a	11	0
-	DF	(Turkey) Faruk Barlas	12	0	n/a	n/a	12	0
-	DF	(Turkey) İsmet Kalaoğlu	5	0	n/a	n/a	5	0
-	DF	(Turkey) Adnan İncirmen	9	0	n/a	n/a	9	0
-	DF	(Turkey) Necmi Erdoğdu	4	1	n/a	n/a	4	1
-	DF	(Turkey) Bülent Eken	12	4	n/a	n/a	12	4
-	MF	(Turkey) Namık Sınmaz	14	0	n/a	n/a	14	0
-	MF	(Turkey) İsmail Yönder	4	0	n/a	n/a	4	0
-	MF	(Turkey) Turgan Ece	7	0	n/a	n/a	7	0
-	MF	(Turkey) Zeki Egeli	1	0	n/a	n/a	1	0
-	MF	(Turkey) Arif Sevinç	13	1	n/a	n/a	13	1
-	FW	(Turkey) Orhan Canpolat	1	0	n/a	n/a	1	0
-	FW	(Turkey) Şahap Turgan	11	0	n/a	n/a	11	0
-	FW	(Turkey) Rasih Minkari	2	0	n/a	n/a	2	0
-	FW	(Turkey) Reha Eken	13	3	n/a	n/a	13	3
-	FW	(Turkey) Muzaffer Tokaç	12	2	n/a	n/a	12	2
-	FW	(Turkey) Nazım Kayar	5	2	n/a	n/a	5	2
-	FW	(Turkey) Mehmet Ali Gültekin	11	0	n/a	n/a	11	0
-	FW	(Turkey) Ahmet Yavaşoğlu	4	1	n/a	n/a	4	1

== Competitions ==
=== Istanbul Football League ===
==== Classification ====
Pos	Team	Pld	W	D	L	GF	GA	GD	Pts
1	Beşiktaş J.K.	14	11	3	0	42	12	+30	39
2	Fenerbahçe SK	14	8	5	1	28	10	+18	35
3	Vefa S.K.	14	6	3	5	21	18	+3	29
4	Galatasaray SK	14	4	6	4	18	15	+3	28
5	İstanbulspor	14	5	2	7	17	17	0	26
6	Beyoğlu S.K.	14	4	2	8	14	31	−17	24
7	Beykoz 1908 S.K.D.	14	2	4	8	13	31	−18	22
8	Küçükçekmece S.K.	14	1	5	8	15	34	−19	21

==== Matches ====
Kick-off listed in local time (EEST)

7 October 1945 1	Beykoz 1908 S.K.D.	1–1	Galatasaray SK	Istanbul
16:00	Ragıp Törün 37'	(Report)	Ahmet Yavaşoğlu 70'	Stadium: Ali Sami Yen Stadı; Referee: Nazım Atınç

14 October 1945 2	Beşiktaş JK	5–1	Galatasaray SK	Istanbul
15:00	Şeref Görkey 3'; Şükrü Gülesin 48', 71', 87'; Hakkı Yeten 50'	(Report)	Şahap Turgan 1'	Stadium: Şeref Stadı; Referee: Nihat Dorken

21 October 1945 3	Galatasaray SK	0–0	İstanbulspor	Istanbul
		(Report)		Stadium: Ali Sami Yen Stadı; Referee: Selami Akal

4 November 1945 4	Beyoğlu SK	1–2	Galatasaray SK	Istanbul
	Koçis Kandidis 85'	(Report)	Şahap Turgan 42'; Muzaffer Tokaç 70'	Stadium: Ali Sami Yen Stadı; Referee: Nazım Atınç

11 November 1945 5	Galatasaray SK	0–0	Fenerbahçe SK	Istanbul
15:00		(Report)		Stadium: Fenerbahçe Stadı; Referee: Feridun Kılıç

18 November 1945 6	Küçükçekmece SK	0–2	Galatasaray SK	Istanbul
		(Report)	Necmi Erdoğdu 73'; Reha Eken 84'	Stadium: Ali Sami Yen Stadı; Referee: Nazım Atınç

25 November 1945 7	Vefa SK	1–0	Galatasaray SK	Istanbul
	Fethi Tosun 54'	(Report)		Stadium: Ali Sami Yen Stadı; Referee: Sıtkı Eryar

16 December 1945 8	Galatasaray SK	1–1	Beykoz 1908 S.K.D.	Istanbul
	Nazım Kayar 10'	(Report)	Mehmet Ali Has 80' (pen.)	Stadium: Ali Sami Yen Stadı; Referee: Nazım Atınç

23 December 1945 9	Galatasaray SK	1–2	Beşiktaş JK	Istanbul
	Şahap Turgan 73'	(Report)	Rauf Alpaslan 3', 31'	Stadium: Şeref Stadı; Referee: Feridun Kılıç

30 December 1945 10	İstanbulspor	0–1	Galatasaray SK	Istanbul
14:30		(Report)	Muzaffer Tokaç 36'	Stadium: Ali Sami Yen Stadı; Referee: Nihat Dorken

6 January 1946 11	Galatasaray SK	6–0	Beyoğlu SK	Istanbul
	Arif Sevinç 45'; Bülent Eken 56', 63', 72', 78'; Nazım Kayar 79'	(Report)		Stadium: Ali Sami Yen Stadı; Referee: Feridun Kılıç

13 January 1946 12	Fenerbahçe SK	1–0	Galatasaray SK	Istanbul
	Naci Bastoncu 3'	(Report)		Stadium: Şeref Stadı; Referee: Şazi Tezcan

20 January 1946 13	Galatasaray SK	1–1	Küçükçekmece SK	Istanbul
	Reha Eken 78'	(Report)	Hikmet Yamanoğlu 37'	Stadium: Ali Sami Yen Stadı; Referee: Şazi Tezcan

27 January 1946 14	Galatasaray SK	2–2	Vefa SK	Istanbul
	Şahap Turgan 26'; Reha Eken 62'	(Report)	Şükrü Demircioğlu 37', 87'	Stadium: Vefa Stadı; Referee: Nazım Atınç

=== Milli Küme Istanbul qualifying round ===
==== Classification ====
Pos	Team	Pld	W	D	L	GF	GA	GAv	Pts
1	Beşiktaş J.K. (Q)	6	4	1	1	–	–	—	13
2	Fenerbahçe (Q)	6	3	2	1	–	–	—	11
3	Vefa SK	6	2	1	3	–	–	—	7
4	Galatasaray SK	6	0	2	4	–	–	—	2

(Q) Qualified for the phase indicated

==== Matches ====
3 March 1946 1	Beşiktaş JK	4–0	Galatasaray SK	Istanbul
		[ (Report)]

9 March 1946 2	Fenerbahçe SK	2–0	Galatasaray SK	Istanbul
		[ (Report)]

10 March 1946 3	Galatasaray SK	–	Vefa SK	Istanbul
		[ (Report)]

17 March 1946 4	Vefa SK	–	Galatasaray SK	Istanbul
		[ (Report)]

24 March 1946 5	Galatasaray SK	1–2	Beşiktaş JK	Istanbul
		[ (Report)]

31 March 1946 6	Galatasaray SK	1–1	Fenerbahçe SK	Istanbul
		[ (Report)]

=== Istanbul Futbol Kupası ===
==== Matches ====
1/2 Final	Galatasaray SK	2–3	Beykoz 1908 S.K.D.	Istanbul
	?	(Report)	?
