= 1948–49 Istanbul Football League =

İstanbul Football League
- Season: 1948–49
- Champions: Galatasaray SK (12th title)
- Goals scored: 178
- Biggest home win: Galatasaray SK 7-1 Beykoz 1908 S.K.D. (9 October 1948)
- Biggest away win: Beykoz 1908 S.K.D. 1-5 Galatasaray SK (15 January 1949)
- Highest scoring: Galatasaray SK 7-1 Beykoz 1908 S.K.D. (9 October 1948)

The 1948–49 İstanbul Football League season was the 41st season of the league. Galatasaray SK won the league for the 12th time.

== Season ==
Pos	Team	Pld	W	D	L	GF	GA	GD	Pts
1	Galatasaray SK	14	12	1	1	39	11	+28	39
2	Beşiktaş JK	14	11	1	2	28	11	+17	37
3	Fenerbahçe SK	14	7	2	5	25	17	+8	30
4	Vefa SK	14	4	5	5	17	20	−3	27
5	Beykoz 1908 S.K.D.	14	3	4	7	17	32	−15	23 (Note: 1 point deducted?)
6	İstanbulspor	14	2	5	7	16	24	−8	23
7	Kasımpaşa SK	14	2	4	8	22	34	−12	22
8	Küçükçekmece SK	14	3	2	9	14	29	−15	22

== Topscorer ==
Pos.	Player	Team	Goals
1	(Turkey) Şükrü Gülesin	Beşiktaş JK	13
2	(Turkey) Reha Eken	Galatasaray SK	11
3	(Turkey) İsfendiyar Açıksöz	Galatasaray SK	8
3	(Turkey) Gündüz Kılıç	Galatasaray SK	8
5	(Turkey) Bülent Esel	Beşiktaş JK	6
4	(Turkey) Erol Keskin	Fenerbahçe SK	5
4	(Turkey) Şeref Sırma	İstanbulspor	5
4	(Turkey) Şaban Şahinoğlu	Kasımpaşa SK	5
5	(Turkey) Muzaffer Tokaç	Galatasaray SK	4
5	(Turkey) Hidayet Volga	Kasımpaşa SK	4
