= 1927–28 Galatasaray S.K. season =

Galatasaray
1927–28 season
- President: (Turkey) Adnan İbrahim Pirioğlu
- Manager: (Scotland) Billy Hunter
- Stadium: Taksim Stadı
Home colours	Away colours

The 1927–28 season was Galatasaray SK's 24th in existence. The Istanbul Football League was aborted due to 1928 Summer Olympics, which were held in Amsterdam.

== Squad statistics ==
No.	Pos.	Name	IFL		Total	
No.	Pos.	Name	Apps	Goals	Apps	Goals
-	GK	(Turkey) Ulvi Yenal	0	0	0	0
-	DF	(Turkey) Mehmet Nazif Gerçin	0	0	0	0
-	DF	(Turkey) Burhan Atak	0	0	0	0
-	MF	(Turkey) Kemal Rıfat Kalpakçıoğlu	0	0	0	0
-	MF	(Turkey) Nihat Bekdik (C)	0	0	0	0
-	MF	(Turkey) Suphi Batur	0	0	0	0
-	FW	(Turkey) Mehmet Leblebi	0	0	0	0
-	FW	(Turkey) Ercüment Işıl	0	0	0	0
-	FW	(Turkey) Kemal Faruki	0	0	0	0
-	FW	(Turkey) Mithat Ertuğ	0	0	0	0
-	FW	(Turkey) Muslihiddin Peykoğlu	0	0	0	0
-	FW	(Turkey) Rebii Erkal	0	0	0	0
-	FW	(Turkey) Latif Yalınlı	0	0	0	0

=== İstanbul Ligi ===
Only two matches were played. Kick-off listed in local time (EET)

18 November 1927 1	Galatasaray SK	4–1	Beşiktaş JK	Istanbul
16:00 EET	Burhan Atak 5'; Muslih Peykoğlu 15', 84'; Kemal Faruki 75'	(Report)	Salahattin Akel 60'	Stadium: Taksim Stadı; Referee: Necmettin Çakar

2 December 1927 2	Galatasaray SK	3–0	İstanbulspor	Istanbul
13:00 EET	Ercüment Işıl 60'; Kemal Faruki 64' n/a (?)	(Report)		Stadium: Taksim Stadı; Referee: Necmettin Çakar

16 December 1927 3	Galatasaray SK	postponed	Vefa SK	Istanbul
14:00 EET		(Report)		Stadium: Taksim Stadı

30 December 1927 4	Galatasaray SK	postponed	Vefa SK	Istanbul
14:00 EET		(Report)		Stadium: Taksim Stadı

6 January 1928 5	Küçükçekmece SK	postponed	Galatasaray SK	Istanbul
14:00 EET		(Report)		Stadium: Taksim Stadı

20 January 1928 6	Fenerbahçe SK	postponed	Galatasaray SK	Istanbul
14:00 EET		(Report)		Stadium: Taksim Stadı

10 February 1928 7	Beykoz 1908 S.K.D.	postponed	Galatasaray SK	Istanbul
14:00 EET		(Report)		Stadium: Taksim Stadı

24 February 1928 8	Harbiye SK	postponed	Galatasaray SK	Istanbul
14:00 EET		(Report)		Stadium: Taksim Stadı

=== Amatör Futbol Şampiyonası ===
1927

Galatasaray SK	5 – 0	Mersin İdman Yurdu
	[(Report)]

Referee: Unknown

1927

Galatasaray SK	2 – 3	Muhafızgücü
	[Final (Report)]

Referee: Unknown

=== Friendly Matches ===
Kick-off listed in local time (EEST)

June 3, 1927

Galatasaray SK	1 – 4	SK Slavia Prague
Burhan Atak(pen.)

Taksim Stadium, Istanbul
Referee: Ahmet Şerafettin Bey

August 22, 1927

Galatasaray SK	2 – 3	SK Slovan Wien
	[(Report)]

Taksim Stadium, Istanbul

September 30, 1927

Galatasaray SK	1 – 1	First Vienna FC
Latif Yalınlı	[(Report)]

Taksim Stadium, Istanbul

April 23, 1928

Galatasaray SK	3 – 1	Beşiktaş JK
	[(Report)]

Taksim Stadium, Istanbul
Referee: Unknown

==== Turkish Football Republic Cup ====
June 8, 1928

Harbiye SK	1 – 1	Galatasaray SK
	Republic Cup

Ankaragücü Stadium, Ankara
Referee: Unknown

June 10, 1928

Galatasaray SK	5 – 2	Beşiktaş JK
	Republic Cup

Taksim Stadium, Istanbul
Referee: Unknown
