= 1925–26 Galatasaray S.K. season =

Galatasaray
1925–26 season
- President: (Turkey) Ali Haydar Şekip
- Manager: (Scotland) Billy Hunter
- Stadium: Taksim Stadı
- Istanbul Lig: 1st
- Top goalscorer: League: Mehmet Leblebi (16); All: Mehmet Leblebi (16)
Home colours	Away colours

The 1925–26 season was Galatasaray SK's 22nd in existence and the club's 16th consecutive season in the Istanbul Football League.

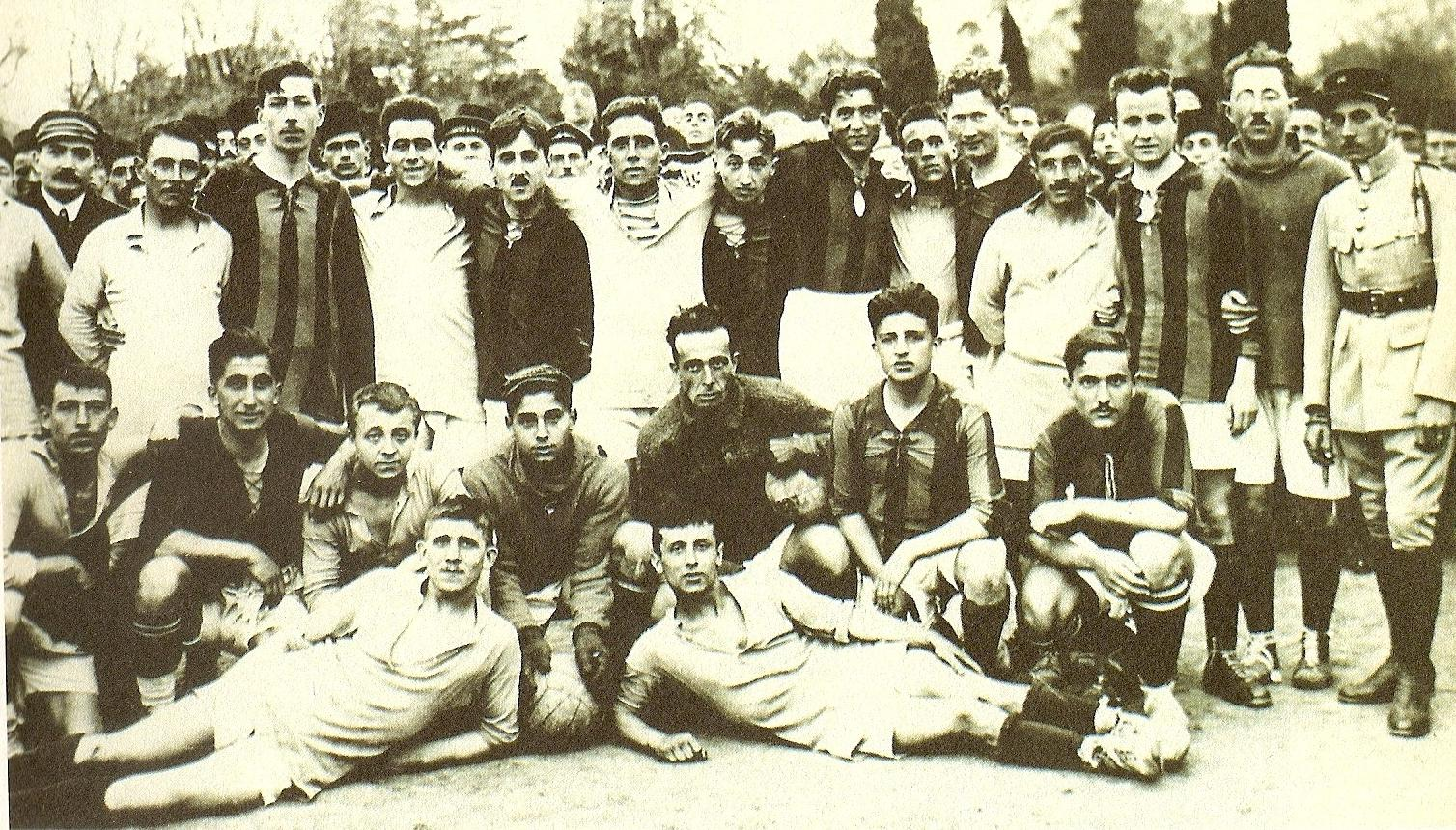
Istanbul League - Galatasaray SK 1925-26 Champion

== Squad statistics ==
No.	Pos.	Name	IFL		Total	
No.	Pos.	Name	Apps	Goals	Apps	Goals
-	GK	(Turkey) Ulvi Yenal	3	0	3	0
-	GK	(Turkey) Rasim Atala	1	0	1	0
-	DF	(Turkey) Mehmet Nazif Gerçin	4	0	4	0
-	DF	(Turkey) Ali	1	0	1	0
-	DF	(Turkey) Burhan Atak	4	0	4	0
-	DF	(Turkey) Şakir Baruer	1	0	1	0
-	DF	(Turkey) Kerim Özdor	3	0	3	0
-	MF	(Turkey) Kemal Rıfat Kalpakçıoğlu	4	0	4	0
-	MF	(Turkey) Nihat Bekdik (C)	4	0	4	0
-	MF	(Turkey) Hayri Cemil Gönen	4	0	4	0
-	FW	(Turkey) Mehmet Leblebi	4	0	4	0
-	FW	(Turkey) Kemal Faruki	3	0	3	0
-	FW	(Turkey) Vedat Abut	4	0	4	0
-	FW	(Turkey) Mithat Ertuğ	4	0	4	0
-	FW	(Turkey) Muslihiddin Peykoğlu	4	0	4	0
-	FW	(Turkey) Şadi Kavur	1	0	1	0

== Competitions ==
=== İstanbul Football League ===
==== Standings ====
Pos	Team
1	Galatasaray SK (C)
2	Fenerbahçe
3	Vefa SK
4	Fatih İdman Yurdu SK
5	Beykozspor
6	Harbiye SK
7	Beşiktaş JK
8	Altınordu İdman Yurdu SK
9	Süleymaniye FC
10	Hilal FC
11	Anadolu
12	Beylerbeyi SK
13	Üsküdar Anadolu SK
14	Haliç SK

(C) Champions

==== Matches ====
20 November 1925 1	Galatasaray SK	20–0	Vefa SK	Istanbul
15:00 EET	Şadi Şadli Alioğlu 5', 9' (?); Nihat Bekdik (?); Mithat Ertuğ (?); Kemal Faruki (?); Kerim Özdor (?); Mehmet Leblebi (?)	(Report)		Stadium: Union Club Field; Referee: Zeki Rıza Sporel

==== Finals ====
26 March 1926 1/4 Final	Galatasaray SK	6–2	Beykoz 1908 S.K.D.	Istanbul
16:00 EET	Vedat Abut 11', 44'; Kerim Özdor 23', 47'; Mehmet Leblebi 31', 63'	(Report)	Sait Foto 28'; Zeki Günel 34'	Stadium: Taksim Stadı; Referee: Kemal Halim Gürgen

16 April 1926 1/2 Final	Galatasaray SK	2–1	Vefa SK	Istanbul
16:00 EET	Vedat Abut 4'; Mithat Ertuğ 55'	(Report)	Ali Rıza 78'	Stadium: Taksim Stadı; Referee: Kemal Halim Gürgen

30 April 1926 Final 1	Galatasaray SK	3–0	Fenerbahçe SK	Istanbul
16:45 EET	Muslihiddin Peykoğlu 25', 37'; Nihat Bekdik 40' (pen.)	(Report)		Stadium: Taksim Stadı; Referee: Kemal Halim Gürgen

14 May 1926 Final 2	Galatasaray SK	3–1	Fenerbahçe SK	Istanbul
17:05 EET	Mehmet Nazif Gerçin 43'; Vedat Abut 60'; Nihat Bekdik 78'	(Report)	Alâaddin Baydar 73'	Stadium: Taksim Stadı; Referee: Kemal Halim Gürgen

=== Friendly Matches ===
Kick-off listed in local time (EEST)

July 24, 1925 Friendly Game	Galatasaray SK	4–0	Greek Team	Istanbul
	Kerim Özdor(2); Muslihiddin Peykoğlu; Bedri			Stadium: Taksim Stadium

August 7, 1925 Friendly Game	Galatasaray SK	4–0	Slavia Prague	Istanbul
				Stadium: Taksim Stadium

April 2, 1926 Friendly Game	Galatasaray SK	0–0	FC Admira Wacker Mödling	Istanbul

July 26, 1926 Friendly Game	Galatasaray SK	0–1	Al-Ahly S.C.	Istanbul
