= 1945–46 İstanbul Football League =

Istanbul Football League
- Season: 1945–46
- Champions: Beşiktaş J.K. (9th title)
- Matches played: 21

The 1945–46 Istanbul Football League season was the 38th season of the league. Beşiktaş J.K. won the league for the 9th time. Beşiktaş JK, Fenerbahçe SK, İstanbulspor, and Galatasaray SK qualified for the National League.

== League table ==
Pos	Team	Pld	W	D	L	GF	GA	GD	Pts
1	Beşiktaş J.K.	14	11	3	0	42	12	+30	39
2	Fenerbahçe SK	14	8	5	1	28	10	+18	35
3	Vefa S.K.	14	6	3	5	21	18	+3	29
4	Galatasaray SK	14	4	6	4	18	15	+3	28
5	İstanbulspor	14	5	2	7	17	17	0	26
6	Beyoğlu S.K.	14	4	2	8	14	31	−17	24
7	Beykoz 1908 S.K.D.	14	2	4	8	13	31	−18	22
8	Küçükçekmece S.K.	14	1	5	8	15	34	−19	21
