= 1919–20 Galatasaray S.K. season =

Galatasaray
1919–20 season
- President: Ali Sami Yen (until 15 May 1919); Refik Cevdet Kalpakçıoğlu
- Manager: Necip Şahin Erson
- Stadium: İttihat Spor Field
Home colours

The 1919–20 season was Galatasaray SK's 16th in existence. The Istanbul Football League was aborted. Galatasaray SK played only friendly matches.

== Friendly matches ==
Kick-off listed in local time (EEST)

3 October 1919	Fenerbahçe SK	3–0	Galatasaray SK	Istanbul
16:30 EET	Alâaddin Baydar 55'; İsmet Uluğ 70'; Sabih Arca 80'	(Report)		Stadium: Union Club Field; Referee: Hikmet Barlan

Galatasaray SK	3 – 2	Üsküdar Anadolu SK	İttihatspor Field
	[(Report)]		Referee: Unknown

Galatasaray SK	12 – 1	Anadolu Hisarı İdman Yurdu SK	İttihatspor Field
	[(Report)]		Referee: Unknown

December 6, 1919	Galatasaray SK	3 – 1	French Garrison	Bakırköy Field, Istanbul
		[(Report)]		Referee: Unknown

January 30, 1920	Galatasaray SK	1 – 1	French Garrison	Bakırköy Field, Istanbul
		[(Report)]		Referee: Unknown

February 27, 1920	Galatasaray SK	5 – 1	French Garrison	Bakırköy Field, Istanbul
		[(Report)]		Referee: Unknown

August 8, 1920	Galatasaray SK	2 – 2	French Garrison	Bakırköy Field, Istanbul
		[(Report)]		Referee: Unknown

August 22, 1920	Galatasaray SK	3 – 3	French Garrison	Bakırköy Field, Istanbul
		[(Report)]		Referee: Unknown

September 12, 1920	Galatasaray SK	2 – 3	French Garrison	Kadıköy, Istanbul
		[(Report)]		Referee: Unknown

October 1, 1920	Galatasaray SK	2 – 0	Irish Guards	İttihatspor Field
		[(Report)]		Referee: Unknown

July 31, 1920	Galatasaray SK	2 – 1	British Garrison	İttihatspor Field
		[(Report)]		Referee: Unknown

=== Türkiye Makriköy Gençlerbirliği Turnuvası ===
Kick-off listed in local time (EEST)

1 October 1920 1/4 Final	Galatasaray SK	2–1	Altınordu İdman Yurdu SK	Istanbul
11:45	Nihat Bekdik 20'; Sadi Karsan 22'	(Report)	Bekir Refet Teker 1'	Stadium: İttihatspor Field; Referee: Abdullah Bey

1 October 1920 1/2 Final	Galatasaray SK	2–0	British Garrison	Istanbul
14:45	Nihat Bekdik 4', 7'	(Report)		Stadium: İttihatspor Field; Referee: Sedat Ziya Bey

1 October 1920 Final	Galatasaray SK	2–3	Fenerbahçe SK	Istanbul
15:00	Necip Şahin Erson 5'; Sadi Karsan 20'	(Report)	Galip Kulaksızoğlu 7'; Alaattin Baydar 26'; Sabih Arca 32'	Stadium: İttihatspor Field; Referee: Fitil Nuri Bey
