= Mehmet Salim Şatıroğlu =

Turkish footballer and coach

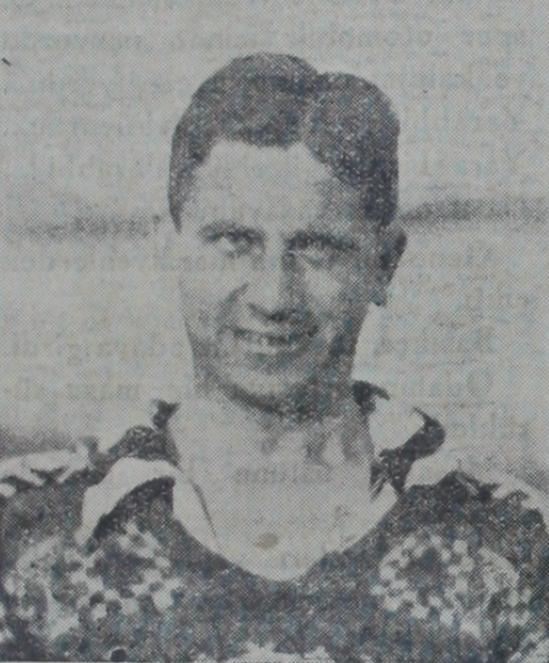

Personal information
- Full name: Mehmet Salim Şatıroğlu
- Date of birth: 1 January 1915
- Place of birth: Istanbul, Ottoman Empire
- Date of death: 20 July 1987 (aged 72)
- Place of death: Trabzon, Turkey
- Position: Defender

Senior career*
Years	Team	Apps	(Gls)
1932–1949	Galatasaray SK	211	(40)
- * Club domestic league appearances and goals

Mehmet Salim Şatıroğlu (1915 – 6 June 1987) was a Turkish former football player and coach. He spent the entirety of his career with his hometown club, Galatasaray SK.

== Career ==
Şatıroğlu was born in Istanbul and played his entire career as a defender for Galatasaray SK. Like many other Galatasaray players at that time, he was a student of Galatasaray High School and started playing football at the Grand Cour of Galatasaray High School.

Şatıroğlu won the Istanbul Football League once.

== Honours ==
=== As player ===
- Galatasaray
  - Istanbul Football League: 1948–49
  - Milli Küme: 1939
  - Istanbul Kupası: 1942, 1943

== See also ==
- List of one-club men
