= Ali Beratlıgil =

Turkish footballer

Personal information
- Date of birth: 21 October 1931
- Place of birth: Izmit, Turkey
- Date of death: 1 February 2016 (aged 84)
- Place of death: Istanbul, Turkey
- Height: 1.78 m (5 ft 10 in)
- Position: Defender

Senior career*
Years	Team	Apps	(Gls)
1951–1958	Galatasaray	112	(32)
1958–1959	Adalet	31	(1)
1959–1961	İstanbulspor	31	(5)
1962–1963	Feriköy	2	(0)
Total		176	(38)

International career
1956–1957	Turkey	5	(1)
- * Club domestic league appearances and goals

Ali Beratlıgil (21 October 1931 − 1 February 2016) was a Turkish football defender who played for Turkey in the 1954 FIFA World Cup. He also played for Galatasaray S.K.
