= 1971–72 Galatasaray S.K. season =

Galatasaray
1971–72 season
- Chairman: Selahattin Beyazıt
- Manager: Brian Birch
- Stadium: Ali Sami Yen Stadium
- 1. Lig: 1st
- Turkish Cup: Quarter-finals
- European Cup: First round
- Turkish Super Cup: Winners
- Top goalscorer: League: Gökmen Özdenak (12); All: Gökmen Özdenak (12)

The 1971–72 season was Galatasaray's 68th in existence and the club's 14th consecutive season in the Turkish First Football League (1.Lig). Under the management of Brian Birch, Galatasaray secured their fifth league title. The club also participated in the Turkish Cup, reaching the quarter-finals, and competed in the European Cup, where they were eliminated in the first round.

== Squad statistics ==
=== Transfers ===
==== In ====
- Ljubomir Milić (from Holland Sport)
- Tarık Küpoğlu (from Sarıyer S.K.)

==== Out ====
- Ergün Acuner (to Beşiktaş J.K.)
- Avram Kalpin (retired)
- Talat Özkarslı (retired)

=== 1.Lig ===
Galatasaray finished the season as champions of the 1.Lig, securing their fifth league title. The team played 30 matches, achieving 17 wins, 8 draws, and 5 losses, with a goal difference of +20.

==== League Table ====
Pos	Team	Pld	W	D	L	GF	GA	GD	Pts	Qualification or relegation
1	Galatasaray (C)	30	17	8	5	34	14	+20	42	Qualification to European Cup first round
2	Eskişehirspor	30	15	9	6	63	34	+29	39	Qualification to UEFA Cup first round
3	Fenerbahçe	30	14	11	5	37	21	+16	39	Qualification to UEFA Cup first round
4	Beşiktaş	30	12	10	8	28	23	+5	34	Invitation to Balkans Cup
5	MKE Ankaragücü	30	10	13	7	22	22	0	33	Qualification to Cup Winners' Cup first round

Rules for classification: 1) points; 2) goal difference; 3) number of goals scored.
(C) Champions

=== Turkish Cup ===
Galatasaray entered the Turkish Cup in the first round and progressed to the quarter-finals:

- First Round: Defeated Şekerspor 3–0 on aggregate
- Second Round: Defeated Göztepe S.K. 4–1 on aggregate
- Quarter-finals: Eliminated by Bursaspor 2–1 on aggregate

=== European Cup ===
As the reigning Turkish champions, Galatasaray participated in the 1971–72 European Cup:

- First Round:
  - First Leg: Galatasaray S.K. 1–1 CSKA Moscow
  - Second Leg: CSKA Moscow 3–0 Galatasaray S.K.
  - Aggregate: CSKA Moscow won 4–1

=== Friendly Matches ===
Galatasaray participated in the TSYD Cup, a pre-season tournament:

- Defeated Fenerbahçe S.K. 1–0
- Lost to Beşiktaş J.K. 1–0

=== Statistics ===
Top Scorers

Top Scorers
Player	League Goals	Total Goals
Gökmen Özdenak	10	13
Ahmet Akkuş	5	7
Oğuz Gözenç	4	6

Disciplinary Record

Disciplinary Record
Player	Yellow Cards	Red Cards
Gökmen Özdenak	3	0
Uğur Köken	2	0
Muzaffer Sipahi	2	0

== Bibliography ==
- 1971–72 1.Lig
- Turkish Cup
- Galatasaray » Squad 1971/1972 (in English)
