= 1918–19 Galatasaray S.K. season =

Galatasaray
1918–19 season
- President: Ali Sami Yen
- Stadium: Papazın Çayırı
Home colours

The 1918–19 season was Galatasaray SK's 15th in existence. The Istanbul Football League was unaccomplished due to the Armistice of Mudros.

== Istanbul Football League ==
13 December 1918 1	Galatasaray SK	1–3	Üsküdar Anadolu SK	İttihat Spor Field, Istanbul
		(Report)		Referee: Unknown

24 January 1919 2	Galatasaray SK	1–7	Süleymaniye SK	İttihat Spor Field, Istanbul
				Referee: Unknown

7 February 1919 3	Galatasaray SK	7–0	Anadolu Hisarı İdman Yurdu SK	İttihat Spor Field, Istanbul
		(Report)		Referee: Unknown

7 March 1919 4	Galatasaray SK	1–4	Altınordu İdman Yurdu SK	İttihat Spor Field, Istanbul
		(Report) After that match, the league was cancelled. Galatasaray SK played only friendly matches.		Referee: Unknown

=== Friendly Matches ===
Kick-off listed in local time (EEST)

20 September 1918	Fenerbahçe SK	4–0	Galatasaray SK	İttihat Spor Field, Istanbul
16:30 EET	Zeki Rıza Sporel 20', 75', 85'; Alaattin Baydar 30'	(Report)		Referee: Aydınoğlu Raşit Bey
