= 1907–08 Galatasaray S.K. season =

Galatasaray SK
1907–08 season
- President: Ali Sami Yen
- Manager: Emin Bülent Serdaroğlu
- Stadium: Papazın Çayırı
- Istanbul Lig: 3rd
Home colours

The 1907–08 season was Galatasaray SK's 4th in existence and the club's 2nd consecutive season in the Istanbul Football League. Ali Sami Yen broke his leg during the Moda FC match and then he announced his retirement from football.

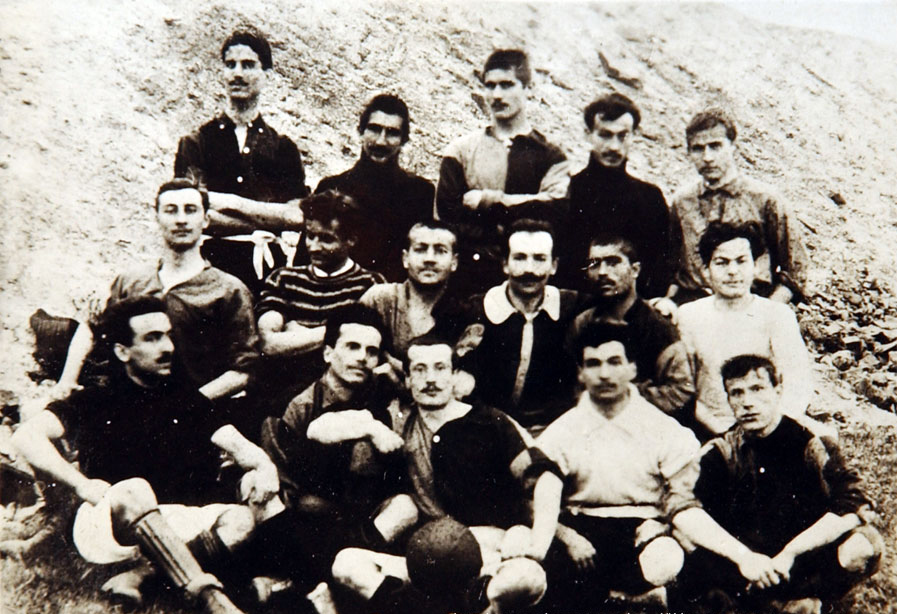

== Squad statistics ==
No.	Pos.	Name	IFL		Total	
No.	Pos.	Name	Apps	Goals	Apps	Goals
-	GK	(Ottoman Empire) Ahmet Robenson	0	0	0	0
-	GK	(Ottoman Empire) Asım Tevfik Sonumut	0	0	0	0
-	DF	(Kingdom of Serbia) Milo Bakic	0	0	0	0
-	MF	(Kingdom of Serbia) Paul Bakic	0	0	0	0
-	MF	(Ottoman Empire) Ali Sami Yen	0	0	0	0
-	DF	(Ottoman Empire) Refik Cevdet Kalpakçıoğlu	0	0	0	0
-	MF	(Ottoman Empire) Tahsin Nahit	0	0	0	0
-	MF	(Ottoman Empire) Bekir Sıtkı Bircan	0	0	0	0
-	MF	(Ottoman Empire) Celal İbrahim	0	0	0	0
-	FW	(Bulgaria) Boris Nikolof(C)	0	0	0	0
-	FW	(Ottoman Empire) Kamil Soysal	0	0	0	0
-	FW	(Ottoman Empire) Abidin Daver	0	0	0	0
-	FW	(Ottoman Empire) Muzaffer Kazancı	0	0	0	0
-	FW	(Ottoman Empire) Ali Müsait	0	0	0	0
-	FW	(Ottoman Empire) Emin Bülent Serdaroğlu	0	0	0	0
-	FW	(Ottoman Empire) Reşat Şirvani	0	0	0	0
-	FW	(Ottoman Empire) Fuat Hüsnü Kayacan	0	0	0	0
-	DF	(Ottoman Empire) Küçük Paul	0	0	0	0

== Istanbul Football League ==
=== Classification ===
1907–08 Istanbul Football League

=== Matches ===
Kick-off listed in local time (EEST)

- Cadi-Keuy FC-Galatasaray SK:11-0 (1907)
- Cadi-Keuy FC-Galatasaray SK:7-0 (1907)
- Cadi-Keuy FC-Galatasaray SK:0-0 (1907)
- Moda FC-Galatasaray SK:1-4
