= Naci Özkaya =

Turkish footballer

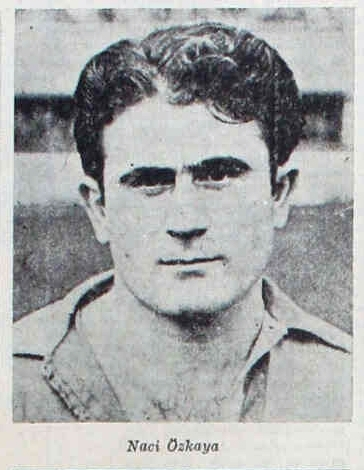

Personal information
- Full name: Mahmut Naci Özkaya
- Date of birth: 1 July 1922
- Place of birth: Trabzon, Turkey
- Date of death: 7 March 2007 (aged 84)
- Place of death: Istanbul, Turkey

International career
Years	Team	Apps	(Gls)
1948–1952	Turkey	16	(0)

Naci Özkaya (1 July 1922 – 7 March 2007) was a Turkish footballer who played at right back. He competed in the men's tournament at the 1948 Summer Olympics.
