= Bülent Eken =

Turkish footballer

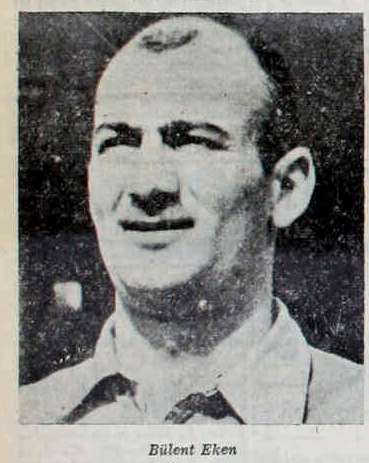

Personal information
- Full name: Bülent Eken
- Date of birth: 26 October 1923
- Place of birth: Mersin, Turkey
- Date of death: 25 July 2016 (aged 92)
- Place of death: Istanbul, Turkey
- Position: Defender

Senior career*
Years	Team	Apps	(Gls)
1942–1950	Galatasaray	140	(56)
1950–1951	Salernitana	21	(1)
1951–1952	Palermo	17	(0)
1952–1955	Galatasaray	12	(0)
Total		190	(57)

International career
1948–1954	Turkey	13	(1)

Managerial career
- 1958-1959: Beyoğluspor
- 1959-1960: Karagümrük
- 1960-1961: İzmirspor
- 1961-1962: Karagümrük
- 1963-1964: Göztepe
- 1964: Karshiyaka
- 1966-1967: Vefa
- 1970-1971: Adanaspor
- 1972-1973: Sivasspor
- 1976-1976: Orduspor
- 1976-1977: Göztepe
- * Club domestic league appearances and goals

Bülent Eken (26 October 1923 – 25 July 2016) was a Turkish footballer and coach. After his club career he became a manager and served as a coach for several Turkish clubs, and also for Turkish national football team.

== Career ==
=== Club career ===
Bülent Eken began his career in 1942 with Galatasaray's A Team. He played as a right-back, left-back, center-back, winger, midfielder, and even as a goalkeeper in this club. Eken won an Istanbul League Championship with Galatasaray. In 1950, he transferred to Salernitana in Italy and later played one season with Palermo. He returned to Galatasaray in 1953 and retired from football a year later.

=== International career ===
Eken played 13 times for the national team. He represented his country at the 1948 Summer Olympics and the 1954 FIFA World Cup. He scored a goal once while being part of the national team, in a match where Syria was defeated 7:0 in the qualifiers of World Cup 1954.

=== Managerial career ===
After retiring from football, he received coaching education in Italy. In 1963, he managed the Turkish national football team. In 1967, he went to Turkey as an assistant coach for Galatasaray SK. Eken later served as a coach for clubs such as Karşıyaka, Göztepe SK, Altay, İzmirspor, Vefa SK, Adanaspor, Orduspor, and Rizespor.

== Family and death ==
He was the brother of former Galatasaray footballers Danyal Vuran and Reha Eken.

Eken died on 25 July 2016, nineteen days after the death of his teammate Turgay Şeren.

== Honours ==
Galatasaray

- Istanbul Football League: 1948–49, 1954–55

Sporting positions
Preceded by Gündüz Kılıç	Galatasaray S.K. Captain; 1953-1954	Succeeded by Muzaffer Tokaç
