= İsfendiyar Açıksöz =

Turkish footballer (1929–2006)

- Açıksöz in 1950

Personal information
- Date of birth: 19 July 1929
- Place of birth: Kastamonu, Turkey
- Date of death: 12 December 2006 (aged 77)
- Place of death: Istanbul, Turkey
- Position: Midfielder

Senior career*
Years	Team	Apps	(Gls)
1946–1950	Galatasaray		
1950–1952	Vefa Istanbul		
1952–1960	Galatasaray		
1967–1968	Orduspor		

International career
1948–1957	Turkey	15	(2)

Managerial career
- 1961–1962: Şekerspor
- 1966–1967: Sarıyer
- * Club domestic league appearances and goals

İsfendiyar Açıksöz (19 July 1929 – 12 December 2006) was a Turkish football player and manager. He played as a right winger for Galatasaray and the Turkey national team.

== Club career ==
Açıksöz was born Kastamonu. He began playing football at Galatasaray High School. He joined Galatasaray at the age of 17. He made a name for himself as the most famous right winger of his era. Açıksöz and his Galatasaray teammates, Suat Mamat, Kadri Aytaç, Güngör Okay, and Metin Oktay, were known as the "legendary forward five" by both the Galatasaray community and the Turkish football public. Açıksöz was particularly known as Metin Oktay's goal-setting center. He left Galatasaray in 1960.

== International career ==
Açıksöz played for the Turkey national team. He played in the Turkey-Brazil match held at İnönü Stadium on 1 May 1956.

He participated in the 1949 Mediterranean Cup held in Greece with the Turkey national team in 1949 and achieved second place with the national team.

== Managerial career ==
After retiring from football, Açıksöz began his career as a manager. He took over as manager of Şekerspor in the 1961–62 season. At the beginning of the 1966–67 season, he was appointed manager of Sarıyer and remained in this position until the end of the season. He served as a player and manager at Orduspor during the 1967–68 season.

== Death ==
Açıksöz died in Istanbul on 12 December 2006. After his funeral prayer was performed during the afternoon prayer at the Fatih Mosque, he was buried in Feriköy Cemetery.

== Career statistics ==
Scores and results list Turkey's goal tally first, score column indicates score after each Açıksöz goal.

List of international goals scored by İsfendiyar Açıksöz
No.	Date	Venue	Opponent	Score	Result	Competition	Ref.
1	3 December 1950	İnönü Stadium, Istanbul, Turkey	Israel	2–2	3–2	Friendly	
2	25 March 1956	National Stadium, Lisbon, Portugal	Portugal	1–3	1–3	Friendly match	

== Honours ==
Turkey

- Mediterranean Cup second place: 1949
