= Muslih Peykoğlu =

Turkish footballer (1905–1960)

Muslih Peykoglu
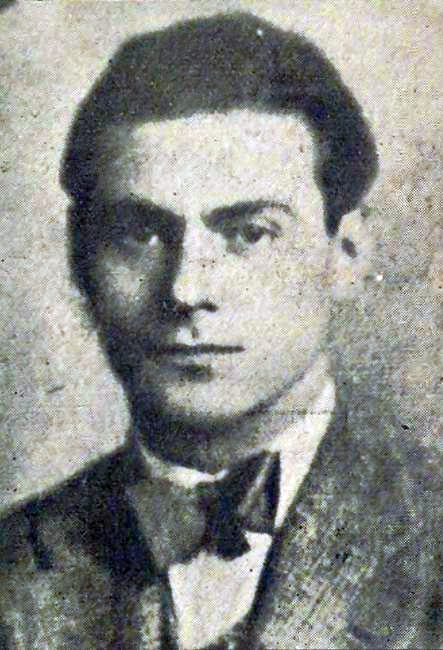
- Peykoğlu in 1934

Personal information
- Full name: Muslihittin Peykoğlu
- Date of birth: 20 October 1905
- Place of birth: Istanbul, Ottoman Empire
- Date of death: 27 December 1960 (aged 55)
- Place of death: Istanbul, Turkey
- Position: Forward

Senior career*
Years	Team	Apps	(Gls)
1921–1934	Galatasaray	31	(12)

International career
1924–1928	Turkey	7	(1)
1928	Turkey Olympic	1	(0)
- * Club domestic league appearances and goals

Muslihittin Peykoğlu (20 October 1905 – 27 December 1960) was a Turkish footballer who represented his nation at the 1928 Summer Olympics in the Netherlands.

== Career statistics ==
=== International ===
National team	Year	Apps	Goals
Turkey
Turkey	1924	3	0
Turkey	1925	0	0
Turkey	1926	2	1
Turkey	1927	0	0
Turkey	1928	2	0
Total		7	1

=== International goals ===
Scores and results list Turkey's goal tally first.

No	Date	Venue	Opponent	Score	Result	Competition
1.	7 May 1926	Taksim Stadium, Istanbul	Romania	1–3	1–3	Friendly
