= Ulvi Yenal =

Turkish footballer

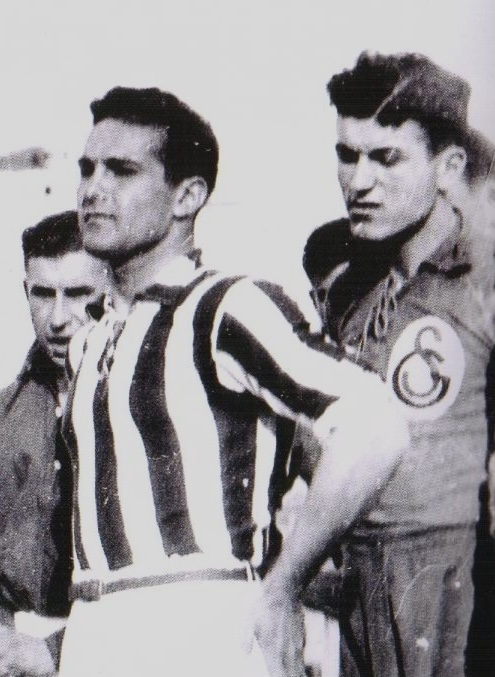
- Ulvi Yenal as a player of Galatasaray (on the right)

Personal information
- Date of birth: 10 April 1908
- Place of birth: Thessaloniki, Greece
- Date of death: 26 May 1993 (aged 85)
- Place of death: Istanbul, Turkey

International career
Years	Team	Apps	(Gls)
- Turkey

Ulvi Yenal (10 April 1908 – 26 May 1993) was a Turkish footballer. He competed in the football tournament at the 1928 Summer Olympics. He also became a CEO of Turkish Airlines in 1956.
