= Reha Eken =

Turkish footballer

Personal information
- Full name: Mehmet Reha Eken
- Date of birth: 28 August 1925
- Place of birth: Istanbul, Turkey
- Date of death: 19 August 2013 (aged 87)
- Place of death: Istanbul, Turkey
- Position: Forward

Senior career*
Years	Team	Apps	(Gls)
1944–1954	Galatasaray	102	(60)
1954–1955	Emniyet	18	(7)
Total		120	(67)

International career
1948–1950	Turkey	4	(6)

Managerial career
- 1957–1958: Karşıyaka S.K.
- 1958–1959: Göztepe S.K.
- * Club domestic league appearances and goals

Mehmet Reha Eken (28 August 1925 – 19 August 2013) was a Turkish professional footballer who played as a forward. He was strongly associated with Galatasaray Istanbul because of his long career at the club. On fan club pages he is regarded as one of the greatest players in the club's history. In his four stakes for the Turkey national team, he scored six goals and has with 1.5 the best goal / game ratio of any Turkey national team player. He was also part of Turkey's squad for the football tournament at the 1948 Summer Olympics, but he did not play in any matches.

His two brothers Danyal Vuran and Bülent Eken were also active as players at Galatasaray.

== Death ==
Eken died on 19 August 2013 in Istanbul at the age of 88.
