= Muzaffer Tokaç =

Turkish footballer

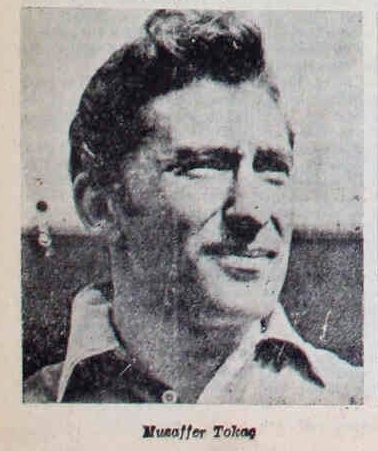

Personal information
- Date of birth: 29 September 1922
- Place of birth: Constantinople, Ottoman Empire
- Date of death: 14 July 2009 (aged 86)
- Place of death: Delray Beach, Florida, U.S.
- Position: Right winger

Senior career*
Years	Team	Apps	(Gls)
1942–1955	Galatasaray	187	(48)

International career
1942–1955	Turkey	13	(2)
- * Club domestic league appearances and goals

Muzaffer Tokaç (29 September 1922 – 14 July 2009) was a Turkish footballer. He competed in the men's tournament at the 1952 Summer Olympics.
