= 1976–77 Galatasaray S.K. season =

Galatasaray
1976–77 season
- President: (Turkey) Selahattin Beyazıt
- Manager: (England) Malcolm Allison
- Stadium: Inönü Stadi
- 1. Lig: 5th
- Türkiye Kupası: 1/4 final
- ECWC: Second round
- Top goalscorer: League: Gökmen Özdenak (16); All: Gökmen Özdenak (13)
- Highest home attendance: 41,189 vs Beşiktaş (1. Lig, 23 January 1977)
- Lowest home attendance: 8,933 vs Zonguldakspor (1. Lig, 21 October 1976)
- Average home league attendance: 21,987
Home colours	Away colours	Third colours

The 1976–77 season was Galatasaray's 72nd in existence and the club's 19th consecutive season in the Turkish First Football League. This article shows statistics of the club's players in the season, and also lists all matches that the club have played in the season.

== Squad statistics ==
No.	Pos.	Name	1. Lig		Türkiye Kupası		ECWC		Total	
No.	Pos.	Name	Apps	Goals	Apps	Goals	Apps	Goals	Apps	Goals
-	GK	(Turkey) Doğan Özdenak	1	0	0	0	0	0	1	0
-	GK	(Turkey) Yılmaz Pamuk	3	0	0	0	0	0	3	0
-	GK	(Turkey) Nihat Akbay	26	0	2	0	4	0	32	0
-	DF	(Turkey) Fatih Terim	29	2	2	0	4	0	35	2
-	DF	(Turkey) Güngör Tekin	24	0	2	0	3	0	29	0
-	DF	(Turkey) Cüneyt Tanman	6	0	1	0	0	0	7	0
-	DF	(Turkey) Furkan Ölçer	3	0	0	0	0	0	3	0
-	DF	(Turkey) Ekrem Günalp	4	0	0	0	0	0	4	0
-	DF	(Turkey) Faruk Aktaş	5	0	0	0	0	0	5	0
-	DF	(Turkey) Arif Kuşdoğan	7	0	0	0	0	0	7	0
-	DF	(Turkey) Müfit Erkasap	17	0	1	0	3	0	21	0
-	DF	(Turkey) Rıdvan Kılıç	17	2	1	0	0	0	18	2
-	DF	(Turkey) Ali Yavaş	5	0	0	0	4	0	9	0
-	DF	(Turkey) Engin Tuncer	16	0	0	0	2	0	18	0
-	MF	(Turkey) Bülent Ünder	25	1	2	0	4	0	31	1
-	MF	(Turkey) Mehmet Oğuz (C)	27	2	2	0	4	0	33	2
-	FW	(Turkey) Nurettin Yılmaz	4	0	0	0	0	0	4	0
-	FW	(Turkey) Fevzi Kezan	1	0	0	0	0	0	1	0
-	FW	(Turkey) Gökmen Özdenak (vice-captain)	21	13	2	0	4	4	27	17
-	FW	(Turkey) Öner Kılıç	24	1	2	0	1	0	27	1
-	FW	(Turkey) Şükrü Tetik	26	0	1	0	2	0	29	0
-	FW	(Turkey) Zafer Dinçer	26	2	2	0	4	0	32	2
-	FW	(Turkey) Şevki Şenlenl	21	5	1	0	4	0	26	5
-	FW	(Turkey) Mehmet Özgül	25	8	2	0	4	1	31	9

=== Players in / out ===
==== In ====
Pos.	Nat.	Name	Age	Moving to
FW	(Turkey)	Öner Kılıç	21	MKE Kırıkkalespor
DF	(Turkey)	Rıdvan Kılıç	20	Adanaspor
FW	(Turkey)	Şükrü Tetik	18	Giresunspor
GK	(Turkey)	Doğan Özdenak	21	İskenderunspor
FW	(Turkey)	Nurettin Yılmaz	21	Galatasaray U21
DF	(Turkey)	Faruk Aktaş	19	Galatasaray U21

==== Out ====
Pos.	Nat.	Name	Age	Moving to
GK	(Turkey)	Yasin Özdenak	28	New York Cosmos
FW	(Turkey)	Metin Kurt	28	Kayserispor
MF	(Turkey)	Mustafa Ergücü	21	Kayserispor
DF	(Turkey)	Tuncay Temeller	28	Diyarbakırspor
DF	(Turkey)	Enver Ürekli	30	Kayserispor
MF	(Turkey)	Aydın Güleş	32	Retired

== 1. Lig ==
=== Standings ===
Pos	Team	Pld	W	D	L	GF	GA	GD	Pts	Qualification or relegation
3	Altay	30	11	13	6	31	22	+9	35	Qualification to UEFA Cup first round
4	Beşiktaş	30	13	7	10	35	24	+11	33	Qualification to Cup Winners' Cup first round
5	Galatasaray	30	10	13	7	36	26	+10	33	Invitation to Balkans Cup
6	Bursaspor	30	10	11	9	34	30	+4	31	
7	Mersin İdman Yurdu	30	9	13	8	25	26	−1	31	

Rules for classification: 1) points; 2) goal difference; 3) number of goals scored.

=== Matches ===
5 September 1976 1	Boluspor	1–0	Galatasaray SK	Bolu
16:30 EET	Mustafa Akarcalı 72'	(Report)		Stadium: Bolu Atatürk Stadium; Referee: Talat Tokat

11 September 1976 2	Galatasaray SK	3–0	Orduspor	Istanbul
17:00 EET	Gökmen Özdenak 25'; Fatih Terim 67' (pen.); Mehmet Oğuz 72'	(Report)		Stadium: Inönü Stadi; Attendance: 24,753; Referee: Ertuğrul Aybay

26 September 1976 3	Galatasaray SK	1–1	Trabzonspor	Istanbul
17:00 EET	Mehmet Özgül 19'	(Report)	Necmi Perekli 8'	Stadium: Inönü Stadi; Attendance: 40,000; Referee: Orhan Cebe

3 October 1976 4	Altay SK	0–0	Galatasaray SK	Izmir
16:30 EET		(Report)		Stadium: Alsancak Stadı; Attendance: 16,186; Referee: Nihat Özbirgül

10 October 1976 5	Galatasaray SK	3–2	Giresunspor	Istanbul
16:30 EET	Mehmet Oğuz 20'; Zafer Dinçer 22'; Fatih Terim 80'	(Report)	Mazlum Fırtına 42'; Murat İnan 64'	Stadium: Inönü Stadi; Attendance: 25,099; Referee: Fehmi Pazarcı

24 October 1976 6	Galatasaray SK	3–2	Zonguldakspor	Istanbul
15:45 EET	Gökmen Özdenak 15'; Mehmet Özgül 83', 85'	(Report)	Özer Umdu 26'; Adem Kurukaya 31'	Stadium: Inönü Stadi; Attendance: 8,933; Referee: Nihat Özbirgül

7 November 1976 7	Göztepe SK	0–1	Galatasaray SK	İzmir
14:30 EET		(Report)	Şevki Şenlen 52'	Stadium: İzmir Atatürk Stadium; Referee: Talat Tokat

20 November 1976 8	Galatasaray SK	1–1	Samsunspor	Istanbul
14:00 EET	Gökmen Özdenak 22'	(Report)	Naim Anuştekin 13'	Stadium: Inönü Stadi; Attendance: 13,334; Referee: Nihat Güner

27 November 1976 9	Galatasaray SK	2–0	Eskişehirspor	Istanbul
14:00 EET	Rıdvan Kılıç 37'; Gökmen Özdenak 85'	(Report)		Stadium: Inönü Stadi; Attendance: 10,784; Referee: Orhan Cebe

5 December 1976 10	Adanaspor	3–1	Galatasaray SK	Adana
13:30 EET	İsa Ertürk 56'; Halis Reçber 60'; Burhan Çetinkaya 84'	(Report)	Gökmen Özdenak 30'	Stadium: Adana 5 Ocak Stadı; Referee: Fehmi Pazarcı

19 December 1976 11	Mersin İdmanyurdu	0–0	Galatasaray	Mersin
13:15 EET		(Report)		Stadium: Tevfik Sırrı Gür Stadium; Referee: Ertuğrul Aybay

26 December 1976 12	Galatasaray SK	4–1	Bursaspor	Istanbul
14:00 EET	Gökmen Özdenak 23' (pen.), 42'; Zafer Dinçer 31'; Mehmet Özgül 44'	(Report)	Tacettin Ergürsel 65'	Stadium: Inönü Stadi; Attendance: 20,796; Referee: Orhan Cebe

2 January 1977 13	Adana Demirspor	0–0	Galatasaray SK	Adana
13:30 EET		(Report)		Stadium: Adana 5 Ocak Stadium; Referee: Yılgör Öktem

9 January 1977 14	Fenerbahçe SK	1–0	Galatasaray SK	Istanbul
14:00 EET	Cemil Turan 82'	(Report)		Stadium: Inönü Stadi; Attendance: 29,722; Referee: Ertuğrul Dilek

23 January 1977 15	Galatasaray SK	2–2	Beşiktaş JK	Istanbul
14:15 EET	Mehmet Özgül 57'; Gökmen Özdenak 77'	(Report)	Kemal Kılıç 15'; Mehmet Akpınar 78'	Stadium: Inönü Stadi; Attendance: 41,189; Referee: Hilmi Ok

12 February 1977 16	Galatasaray SK	1–2	Boluspor	Istanbul
14:30 EET	Bülent Ünder 88' (pen.)	(Report)	Mustafa Akarcalı 65'; Rıdvan Ertan 70' (pen.)	Stadium: Inönü Stadi; Attendance: 21.173; Referee: Ertuğrul Aybay

20 February 1977 17	Orduspor	0–0	Galatasaray SK	Ordu
13:15 EET		(Report)		Stadium: Ordu 19 Eylül Stadium; Referee: Nihat Özbirgül

27 February 1977 18	Trabzonspor	1–0	Galatasaray SK	Trabzon
13:45 EET	Ali Kemal Denizci 11'	(Report)		Stadium: Hüseyin Avni Aker Stadium; Referee: Ertuğrul Aybay

6 March 1977 19	Galatasaray SK	0–1	Altay SK	Istanbul
14:45 EET		(Report)	Mustafa Denizli 11'	Stadium: Inönü Stadi; Attendance: 16,017; Referee: Yılmaz Önen

13 March 1977 20	Giresunspor	1–1	Galatasaray SK	Giresun
14:45 EET	Fevzi Kezan 50'	(Report)	Şevki Şenlen 27'	Stadium: Atatürk Stadi; Referee: Nihat Özbirgül

20 March 1977 21	Galatasaray SK	2–2	Fenerbahçe SK	Istanbul
14:45 EET	Şevki Şenlen 1'; Mehmet Özgül 40'	(Report)	Osman Arpacıoğlu 14'; Önder Mustafaoğlu 74'	Stadium: Inönü Stadi; Attendance: 40,986; Referee: Ertuğrul Dilek

27 March 1977 22	Zonguldakspor	0–3	Galatasaray SK	Zonguldak
14:45 EET		(Report)	Şevki Şenlen 17', 47'; Gökmen Özdenak 54'	Stadium: Kemal Köksal Stadium; Referee: İhsan Türe

2 April 1977 23	Galatasaray SK	0–0	Göztepe SK	Istanbul
14:45 EET		(Report)		Stadium: Inönü Stadi; Attendance: 11,240; Referee: Yılgör Öktem

24 April 1977 24	Samsunspor	1–1	Galatasaray SK	Samsun
15:15 EET	Osman Yılmaz 55'	(Report)	Mehmet Özgül 89'	Stadium: 19 Mayıs Stadı; Referee: Yılmaz Dinçel

4 September 1977 25	Eskişehirspor	0–1	Galatasaray SK	Eskişehir
17:00 EET		(Report)	Gökmen Özdenak 15'	Stadium: Eskişehir Atatürk Stadium; Referee: Müşfik Talas

8 May 1977 26	Galatasaray SK	3–2	Adanaspor	Istanbul
15:15 EET	Gökmen Özdenak 56', 58', 72'	(Report)	Halis Reçber 47'; İrfan Kaynak 85'	Stadium: Inönü Stadi; Referee: Talat Tokat

15 May 1977 27	Beşiktaş J.K.	0–2	Galatasaray SK	Istanbul
16:00 EET		(Report)	Rıdvan Kılıç 32'; Mehmet Özgül 44'	Stadium: Inönü Stadi; Attendance: 41,189; Referee: Ertuğrul Dilek

22 May 1977 28	Galatasaray SK	1–1	Mersin İdmanyurdu	Istanbul
18:00 EET	Öner Kılıç 32'	(Report)	Müjdat Karanfilci 60'	Stadium: Inönü Stadi; Attendance: 11,527; Referee: Müşfik Talas

29 May 1977 29	Bursaspor	1–0	Galatasaray SK	Bursa
18:00 EET	Bünyamin Çulcu 27'	(Report)		Stadium: Bursa Atatürk Stadı; Referee: Orhan Cebe

8 June 1977 30	Galatasaray SK	0–0	Adana Demirspor	Istanbul
16:00 EET		(Report)		Stadium: Inönü Stadi; Referee: Yılmaz Önen

== Turkiye Kupasi ==
=== 1/4 final ===
9 March 1977 1	Galatasaray SK	1–1	Orduspor	Istanbul
14:45 EET	Erol Aydoğdu 24'	(Report)	Cihan Umanç 40'	Stadium: Inönü Stadi; Attendance: 10,000; Referee: Ziya Türkdoğan

30 March 1977 2	Orduspor	0–0	Galatasaray SK	Ordu
14:450 EET		(Report)		Stadium: Ordu 19 Eylül Stadium; Referee: Talat Tokat

== European Cup Winners' Cup ==
=== First round ===
15 September 1976 1	AIK Fotboll	1–2	Galatasaray SK	Stockholm
00:00 EET	Jan-Olof Wallgren 40'	(Report)	Gökmen Özdenak 65'; Mehmet Özgül 78'	Stadium: Råsunda Stadium; Attendance: 2,330; Referee: (Norway) Svein-Inge Thime

29 September 1976 2	Galatasaray SK	1–1	AIK Fotboll	Istanbul
14:15 EET	Gökmen Özdenak 30'	(Report)	Jan-Olof Wallgren 80'	Stadium: Inönü Stadi; Attendance: 32,035; Referee: (Romania) Nicolae Petriceanu

=== Second round ===
20 October 1976 1	RSC Anderlecht	5–1	Galatasaray	Anderlecht
00:00 EET	Ludo Coeck 10'; Franky Vercauteren 19'; Rob Rensenbrink 52' (pen.), 72'; François Van der Elst 81'	(Report)	Gökmen Özdenak 49'	Stadium: Constant Vanden Stock Stadium; Referee: (East Germany) Wolfgang Riedel

3 November 1976 2	Galatasaray	1–5	RSC Anderlecht	Istanbul
14:15 EET	Gökmen Özdenak 35'	(Report)	Rob Rensenbrink 25', 64'; Arie Haan 42'; Peter Ressel 70'; Ludo Coeck 71'	Stadium: Inönü Stadi; Attendance: 30,588; Referee: (Hungary) Sandor Petri

== Friendly match ==
=== Pre-season friendly ===
16 August 1976	Fenerbahçe SK	2–1	Galatasaray SK	Istanbul
20:00 EET	Arif Aydın Çelik 65'; Cemil Turan 89'	(Report)	Gökmen Özdenak 63'	Stadium: Inönü Stadi; Attendance: 28,136; Referee: Cumhur Demir

24 August 1976	Beşiktaş J.K.	0–0	Galatasaray SK	Istanbul
15:00 EET		(Report)		Stadium: Inönü Stadi; Attendance: 5.778; Referee: Emin Tuncali

=== Yasin Özdenak Testimonial match ===
27 August 1976	Galatasaray SK	1–2	Fenerbahçe SK	Istanbul
15:00 EET	Faruk Aktaş 43'	(Report)	Ömer Kaner 31', 71'	Stadium: Mithatpaşa Stadi; Attendance: 13,860; Referee: Erkan Göksel

=== Quad-tournament ===
14 November 1976	Fenerbahçe SK	4–2	Galatasaray SK	Istanbul
15:00 EET	Osman Arpacıoğlu 21', 84'; Yenal Kaçıra 57' (pen.); Ender Konca 76'	(Report)	Nurettin Yılmaz 12'; Şevki Şenlen 22'	Stadium: Inönü Stadi; Attendance: 36,749; Referee: Güngör Tuncel

=== Deprem Kupası ===
11 December 1976	Beşiktaş J.K.	1–3	Galatasaray SK	Ankara
14:00 EET	Mehmet Akpınar 29'	(Report)	Güngör Tekin 38'; Şevki Şenlen 50'; Gökmen Özdenak 68'	Stadium: 19 Mayıs Stadı; Attendance: 34,467; Referee: Yılmaz Önen

12 December 1976	Fenerbahçe SK	6–1	Galatasaray SK	Ankara
15:00 EET	Cemil Turan 27', 43', 44' (pen.); Engin Verel 58'; Ömer Kaner 68', 70'	(Report)	Rıdvan Kılıç 8'	Stadium: 19 Mayıs Stadı; Attendance: 26,385; Referee: Ziya Türkdoğan

== Attendance ==
Competition	Av. Att.	Total Att.
1. Lig	285,831	21,987
Türkiye Kupası	10,000	10,000
ECWC	62,623	31,312
Total	358,454	22,403
