= 1978–79 Galatasaray S.K. season =

Galatasaray
1978–79 season
- President: (Turkey) Selahattin Beyazıt (until 27 January 1979) (Turkey) Ali Uras
- Manager: (Turkey) Coşkun Özarı
- Stadium: Inönü Stadi
- 1. Lig: 2nd
- Türkiye Kupası: 5th round
- UEFA Cup: 1st round
- Top goalscorer: League: Ešref Jašarević (9); Gökmen Özdenak (9); All: Ešref Jašarević (9); Gökmen Özdenak (9)
- Highest home attendance: 36,836 vs Fenerbahçe SK (1. Lig, 22 October 1978)
- Lowest home attendance: 5,268 vs MKE Kırıkkalespor (Türkiye Kupası, 25 October 1978)
- Average home league attendance: 23,094
Home colours	Away colours	Third colours

The 1978–79 season was Galatasaray's 75th in existence and the club's 21st consecutive season in the Turkish First Football League. This article shows statistics of the club's players in the season, and also lists all matches that the club have played in the season.

== Squad statistics ==
No.	Pos.	Name	1. Lig		Türkiye Kupası		UEFA Cup		Total	
No.	Pos.	Name	Apps	Goals	Apps	Goals	Apps	Goals	Apps	Goals
-	GK	(Turkey) Eser Özaltındere	28	0	2	0	1	0	31	0
-	GK	(Turkey) Bahattin Demircan	2	0	0	0	1	0	3	0
-	GK	(Turkey) Haydar Erdoğan	0	0	0	0	0	0	0	0
-	DF	(Turkey) Fatih Terim (C)	27	2	2	2	2	1	31	5
-	DF	(Turkey) Güngör Tekin	28	4	1	0	2	0	31	4
-	DF	(Turkey) Cüneyt Tanman	26	5	2	0	2	0	30	5
-	DF	(Turkey) Erdoğan Arıca	29	0	2	0	2	0	33	0
-	DF	(Turkey) Müfit Erkasap	27	0	1	0	2	0	30	0
-	DF	(Turkey) Tuncay Temeller	1	0	0	0	2	0	3	0
-	DF	(Turkey) Rıdvan Kılıç	16	0	2	0	1	0	19	0
-	DF	(Turkey) Ali Yavaş	2	0	0	0	1	0	3	0
-	MF	(Socialist Federal Republic of Yugoslavia) Jusuf Hatunić	4	0	2	0	0	0	6	0
-	MF	(Turkey) Mehmet Oğuz	29	1	2	0	1	0	32	1
-	MF	(Turkey) Gürcan Aday	15	1	1	0	1	0	17	1
-	MF	(Turkey) Metin Yıldız	2	0	1	0	0	0	3	0
-	MF	(Turkey) Turgay İnal	18	4	2	0	1	1	21	5
-	MF	(Turkey) Hasan Moralı	2	0	0	0	0	0	2	0
-	FW	(Turkey) Murat Kandil	0	0	0	0	1	0	1	0
-	FW	(Turkey) Gökmen Özdenak	30	9	1	0	1	0	32	9
-	FW	(Turkey) Öner Kılıç	30	7	2	0	2	0	34	7
-	FW	(Turkey) Tacettin Ergürsel	2	0	0	0	2	0	4	0
-	FW	(Socialist Federal Republic of Yugoslavia) Ešref Jašarević	24	9	2	0	0	0	26	9
-	FW	(Turkey) Zafer Dinçer	19	4	1	0	0	0	20	4
-	FW	(Turkey) Mustafa Dil	1	0	0	0	0	0	1	0

=== Players in / out ===
==== In ====
Pos.	Nat.	Name	Age	Moving to
GK	(Turkey)	Eser Özaltındere	24	Adana Demirspor
FW	(Socialist Federal Republic of Yugoslavia)	Ešref Jašarević	26	Kayserispor
DF	(Socialist Federal Republic of Yugoslavia)	Jusuf Hatunić	28	Kayserispor
FW	(Turkey)	Metin Yıldız	18	Galatasaray A2
MF	(Turkey)	Hasan Moralı	20	Galatasaray A2

==== Out ====
Pos.	Nat.	Name	Age	Moving to
GK	(Turkey)	Nihat Akbay	33	Retired
FW	(Turkey)	Şükrü Tetik	21	Samsunspor
MF	(Turkey)	Bülent Ünder	29	Retired

== 1. Lig ==
=== Standings ===
Pos	Team	Pld	W	D	L	GF	GA	GD	Pts	Qualification or relegation
1	Trabzonspor (C)	30	13	16	1	34	7	+27	42	Qualification to European Cup first round
2	Galatasaray	30	17	7	6	47	17	+30	41	Qualification to UEFA Cup first round
3	Fenerbahçe	30	15	8	7	41	23	+18	38	Qualification to Cup Winners' Cup first round
4	Orduspor	30	13	8	9	31	27	+4	34	Qualification to UEFA Cup first round
5	Diyarbakırspor	30	13	6	11	26	31	−5	32	

Rules for classification: 1) points; 2) goal difference; 3) number of goals scored.
(C) Champions

=== Matches ===
Kick-off listed in local time (EET)

27 August 1978 1	Galatasaray	3–0	Diyarbakırspor	Istanbul
17:00 EET	Turgay İnal 8'; Öner Kılıç 42'; Gökmen Özdenak 77'	(Report)		Stadium: Inönü Stadi; Attendance: 30,000; Referee: Yılmaz Önen

3 September 1978 2	Altay SK	0–0	Galatasaray	Izmir
20:30 EET		(Report)		Stadium: İzmir Atatürk Stadı; Attendance: 13,000; Referee: Nihat Özbirgül

10 September 1978 3	Galatasaray	1–0	Zonguldakspor	Istanbul
17:00 EET	Gökmen Özdenak 47'	(Report)		Stadium: Inönü Stadi; Attendance: 15,519; Referee: İhsan Türe

17 September 1978 4	Orduspor	0–0	Galatasaray	Ordu
15:30 EET		(Report)		Stadium: Ordu 19 Eylül Stadium; Referee: Yılmaz Dinçel

30 September 1978 5	Galatasaray	1–0	Boluspor	Istanbul
16:00 EET	Cüneyt Tanman 66'	(Report)		Stadium: Inönü Stadi; Attendance: 18,761; Referee: Talat Tokat

8 October 1978 6	Adana Demirspor	1–0	Galatasaray	Adana
17:00 EET	Müjdat Karanfilci 44'	(Report)		Stadium: Adana 5 Ocak Stadium; Referee: Orhan Cebe

15 October 1978 7	Eskişehirspor	0–0	Galatasaray	Eskişehir
15:00 EET		(Report)		Stadium: Eskişehir Atatürk Stadium; Referee: Talat Tokat

22 October 1978 8	Galatasaray	1–1	Fenerbahçe	Istanbul
15:00 EET	Erhan Altın 36'	(Report)	Erol Togay 82'	Stadium: Inönü Stadi; Attendance: 36,836; Referee: Erkan Göksel

4 November 1978 9	Galatasaray	1–2	Adanaspor	Istanbul
14:30 EET	Cüneyt Tanman 60'	(Report)	Timuçin Çuğ 65'; Erdem Eren 71'	Stadium: Inönü Stadi; Attendance: 14,888; Referee: Orhan Cebe

12 November 1978 10	Trabzonspor	0–0	Galatasaray	Trabzon
12:30 EET		(Report)		Stadium: Hüseyin Avni Aker Stadium; Referee: İhsan Türe

19 November 1978 11	Beşiktaş	0–1	Galatasaray	Istanbul
14:30 EET		(Report)	Öner Kılıç 47'	Stadium: Inönü Stadi; Attendance: 39,653; Referee: Cumhur Demir

3 December 1978 12	Samsunspor	0–1	Galatasaray SK	Samsun
13:45 EET		(Report)	Cüneyt Tanman 26'	Stadium: 19 Mayıs Stadı; Referee: Talat Tokat

9 December 1978 13	Galatasaray SK	6–1	Göztepe S.K.	Istanbul
14:00 EET	Güngör Tekin 1'; Öner Kılıç 24'; Cüneyt Tanman 26'; Zafer Dinçer 74'; Ešref Jašarević 81'; Turgay İnal 88'	(Report)	Kazım Korur 19'	Stadium: İnönü Stadı; Attendance: 13,245; Referee: Nihat Özbirgül

17 December 1978 14	MKE Kırıkkalespor	0–0	Galatasaray SK	Kırıkkale
13:30 EET		(Report)		Stadium: Fikret Karabudak Stadı; Referee: İhsan Türe

24 December 1978 15	Bursaspor	1–0	Galatasaray	Bursa
14:00 EET	Sedat Özbağ 9'	(Report)		Stadium: Bursa Atatürk Stadı; Referee: Talat Tokat

11 February 1979 16	Diyarbakırspor	1–0	Galatasaray	Diyarbakır
14:45 EET	Sedat Gezer 81'	(Report)		Stadium: Diyarbakır Atatürk Stadium; Referee: İhsan Türe

17 February 1979 17	Galatasaray	2–0	Altay	Istanbul
15:30 EET	Öner Kılıç 8'; Ešref Jašarević 38'	(Report)		Stadium: Inönü Stadi; Attendance: 19,286; Referee: Yılmaz Önen

25 February 1979 18	Zonguldakspor	2–0	Galatasaray	Zonguldak
15:15 EET	İsa Ertürk 34'; Sinan Alayoğlu 48'	(Report)		Stadium: Kemal Köksal Stadium; Referee: Talat Toka

4 March 1979 19	Galatasaray	4–0	Orduspor	Istanbul
15:00 EET	Zafer Dinçer 48'; Güngör Tekin 55'; Gökmen Özdenak 73', 74'	(Report)		Stadium: Inönü Stadi; Attendance: 20,450; Referee: İhsan Türe

11 March 1979 20	Boluspor	1–1	Galatasaray	Bolu
15:00 EET	Mehmet Özgül 56'	(Report)	Ešref Jašarević 44'	Stadium: Bolu Atatürk Stadium; Referee: Yılmaz Önen

25 March 1979 21	Galatasaray SK	2–1	Adana Demirspor	Istanbul
15:00 EET	Gökmen Özdenak 50'; Ešref Jašarević 61'	(Report)	Hüseyin Çelik 46'	Stadium: Inönü Stadi; Attendance: 21,944; Referee: Oktay Taner

8 April 1979 22	Galatasaray	3–0	Eskişehirspor	Istanbul
15:00 EET	Zafer Dinçer 30'; Ešref Jašarević 39', 66'	(Report)		Stadium: Inönü Stadi; Attendance: 25,367; Referee: Sadık Deda

15 April 1979 23	Fenerbahçe	2–0	Galatasaray SK	Istanbul
15:00 EET	Erol Togay 53'; Şevki Şenlen 89'	(Report)		Stadium: Inönü Stadi; Attendance: 36,388; Referee: Hilmi Ok

22 April 1979 24	Galatasaray SK	5–1	Bursaspor	Istanbul
15:00 EET	Ešref Jašarević 7', 9', 14'; Öner Kılıç 28'; Gökmen Özdenak 42'	(Report)	Cengiz Tunçman 75'	Stadium: Inönü Stadi; Attendance: 19,148; Referee: Nihat Özbirgül

29 April 1979 25	Adanaspor	1–2	Galatasaray SK	Adana
15:00 EET	Özer Umdu 20' (pen.)	(Report)	Fatih Terim 37' (pen.); Gökmen Özdenak 75'	Stadium: Adana 5 Ocak Stadı; Referee: Sadık Deda

5 May 1979 26	Galatasaray SK	1–0	Trabzonspor	Istanbul
15:30 EET	Gürcan Aday 65'	(Report)		Stadium: Inönü Stadi; Attendance: 20,345; Referee: Orhan Cebe

13 May 1979 27	Galatasaray SK	3–1	Beşiktaş JK	Istanbul
15:30 EET	Gökmen Özdenak 13'; Güngör Tekin 44'; Cüneyt Tanman 89'	(Report)	Ziya Doğan 24'	Stadium: Inönü Stadi; Attendance: 38,417; Referee: Hilmi Ok

20 May 1979 28	Galatasaray SK	5–0	Samsunspor	Istanbul
15:30 EET	Öner Kılıç 30'; Gökmen Özdenak 38'; Güngör Tekin 51'; Turgay İnal 79', 83'	(Report)		Stadium: Inönü Stadi; Attendance: 25,000; Referee: Nihat Güner

27 May 1979 29	Göztepe SK	0–1	Galatasaray	İzmir
15:30 EET		(Report)	Mehmet Oğuz 45'	Stadium: İzmir Atatürk Stadium; Attendance: 22,539; Referee: Celal Türk

3 June 1979 30	Galatasaray SK	3–1	MKE Kırıkkalespor	Istanbul
15:30 EET	Zafer Dinçer 6'; Fatih Terim 56'; Öner Kılıç 66'	(Report)	Mustafa Bakkal 22'	Stadium: Inönü Stadi; Attendance: 27,209; Referee: Yavuz Tunç

== Turkiye Kupasi ==
=== 5th stage ===
25 October 1978 1	Galatasaray SK	2–1	MKE Kırıkkalespor	Istanbul
15:00 EET	Fatih Terim 23' (pen.), 86'	(Report)	Halil Ağan 70'	Stadium: Inönü Stadı; Attendance: 5,268; Referee: Özcan Gürkaynak

8 November 1978 2	MKE Kırıkkalespor	1–0	Galatasaray SK	Kırıkkale
14:00 EET	Mehmet Çardak 45'	(Report)		Stadium: Fikret Karabudak Stadı; Referee: Müşfik Talas

== UEFA Cup ==
=== First round ===
13 September 1978 1	Galatasaray SK	1–3	West Bromwich Albion F.C.	İzmir
	Fatih Terim 88' (pen.)	(Report)	Bryan Robson 6'; Laurie Cunningham 62', 67'	Stadium: Atatürk Stadı; Attendance: 38,443; Referee: Francisc Kolossi

27 September 1978 2	West Bromwich Albion F.C.	3–1	Galatasaray SK	West Bromwich
	Bryan Robson 33'; Laurie Cunningham 39' (pen.); John Trewick 47'	(Report)	Turgay İnal 44'	Stadium: The Hawthorns; Referee: Antonio Garrido

== Başbakanlık Kupası ==
Kick-off listed in local time (EET)

10 June 1979 1	Galatasaray SK	1–0	Altay SK	Ankara
18:00 EET	Fatih Terim 25'	(Report)		Stadium: 19 Mayıs Stadı; Referee: Nihat Özbirgül

== Friendly Matches ==
=== Nihat Akbay Testimonial match ===
Kick-off listed in local time (EET)

5 August 1978	Galatasaray SK	1–4	Trabzonspor	Istanbul
20:30 EET	Tuncay Temeller 64'	(Report)	Serdar Bali 34'; Hüseyin Tok 40'; Yaşar Alemdaroğlu 57'; Necdet Ergün 80'	Stadium: Inönü Stadi; Attendance: 21,523; Referee: Güngör Tuncel

=== TSYD Kupası ===
9 August 1978 1	Fenerbahçe SK	1–0	Galatasaray SK	Istanbul
20:00 EET	Cemil Turan 59'	(Report)		Stadium: Inönü Stadı; Attendance: 34,370; Referee: Erdoğan Albay

11 August 1978 2	Galatasaray SK	1–0	Beşiktaş JK	Istanbul
20:00 EET	Güngör Tekin 43'	(Report)		Stadium: Inönü Stadı; Attendance: 14,053; Referee: Emin Tuncalı

== Attendance ==
Competition	Av. Att.	Total Att.
1. Lig	23,094	346,415
Türkiye Kupası	5,268	5,268
UEFA Cup	38,443	38,443
Total	22,949	390,126
