= 1973–74 Galatasaray S.K. season =

Galatasaray
1973–74 season
- President: Mustafa Pekin
- Manager: Brian Birch
- Stadium: Mithatpaşa Stadi
- 1. Lig: 5th
- Türkiye Kupası: 1/2 final
- European Cup: 1st round
- Top goalscorer: League: Mehmet Özgül (6); Mustafa Ergücü (6); All: Mehmet Özgül (6); Mustafa Ergücü (6)
- Highest home attendance: 43,068 vs Fenerbahçe SK (30 September 1973)
- Lowest home attendance: 4,245 vs Mersin İdmanyurdu (12 May 1974)
- Average home league attendance: 26,604
Home colours	Away colours	Third colours

The 1973–74 season was Galatasaray's 70th in existence and the club's 16th consecutive season in the Turkish First Football League. This article shows statistics of the club's players in the season, and also lists all matches that the club have played in the season.

== Squad statistics ==
No.	Pos.	Name	1. Lig		Türkiye Kupası		European Cup		Total	
No.	Pos.	Name	Apps	Goals	Apps	Goals	Apps	Goals	Apps	Goals
-	GK	(Turkey) Yasin Özdenak	30	0	4	0	2	0	36	0
-	GK	(Turkey) Nihat Akbay	0	0	0	0	0	0	0	0
-	DF	(Turkey) Samim Yağız	5	0	2	0	0	0	7	0
-	DF	(Turkey) Muzaffer Sipahi (C)	18	0	3	0	1	0	22	0
-	DF	(Turkey) Arif Kuşdoğan	6	0	0	0	0	0	6	0
-	DF	(Turkey) Ekrem Günalp	26	0	2	0	2	0	30	0
-	DF	(Turkey) Murat İnan	3	0	0	0	0	0	3	0
-	DF	(Turkey) Tuncay Temeller	27	4	2	0	2	0	31	4
-	DF	(Turkey) Enver Ürekli	24	2	3	0	0	0	27	2
-	DF	(Turkey) Cüneyt Tanman	2	0	0	0	0	0	2	0
-	MF	(Turkey) Bülent Ünder	19	2	1	0	2	0	22	2
-	DF	(Turkey) Aydın Güleş	24	0	4	0	2	0	30	0
-	MF	(Turkey) Ahmet Akkuş	22	2	4	0	0	0	26	2
-	MF	(Turkey) Mehmet Oğuz	24	1	1	0	2	0	27	1
-	MF	(Turkey) Mustafa Ergücü	25	6	3	0	2	0	30	6
-	FW	(Turkey) Gökmen Özdenak	11	3	2	1	1	0	14	4
-	FW	(Turkey) Tarık Küpoğlu	22	1	3	0	2	0	27	1
-	FW	(Turkey) Metin Kurt	17	1	4	0	1	0	22	1
-	FW	(Turkey) Engin Verel	15	0	4	1	0	0	19	1
-	FW	(Turkey) Korhan Tınaz	7	0	0	0	2	0	9	0
-	FW	(Turkey) Şevki Şenlenl	15	1	3	0	2	0	20	1
-	FW	(Turkey) Suphi Soylu	5	0	0	0	0	0	5	0
-	FW	(Turkey) Mehmet Özgül	23	6	3	0	1	0	27	6

=== Players in / out ===
==== In ====
Pos.	Nat.	Name	Age	Moving from
FW	(Turkey)	Şevki Şenlen	24	Eskişehirspor
DF	(Turkey)	Enver Ürekli	27	PTT
MF	(Turkey)	Mustafa Ergücü	18	Galatasaray U21
FW	(Turkey)	Engin Verel	17	Galatasaray U21
DF	(Turkey)	Cüneyt Tanman	17	Galatasaray U21
DF	(Turkey)	Murat İnan	17	Galatasaray U21

==== Out ====
Pos.	Nat.	Name	Age	Moving to
FW	(Turkey)	Uğur Köken	36	Retired

== 1. Lig ==
=== Standings ===
Pos	Team	Pld	W	D	L	GF	GA	GD	Pts	Qualification or relegation
3	Boluspor	30	12	15	3	33	21	+12	39	Qualification to UEFA Cup first round
4	Eskişehirspor	30	14	8	8	34	24	+10	36	Invitation to Balkans Cup
5	Galatasaray	30	13	9	8	29	16	+13	35	
6	Altay	30	11	9	10	25	22	+3	31	
7	Adanaspor	30	8	13	9	20	26	−6	29	

Rules for classification: 1) points; 2) goal difference; 3) number of goals scored.

=== Matches ===
9 September 1973 1	Galatasaray SK	3–1	Boluspor	Istanbul
16:45 EET	Bülent Ünder 19'; Gökmen Özdenak 35'; Mustafa Ergücü 70'	(Report)	Sinan Alayoğlu 74'	Stadium: Mithatpaşa Stadi; Attendance: 35,190; Referee: Ziya Türkdoğan

15 September 1973 2	MKE Ankaragücü	0–0	Galatasaray SK	Ankara
16:45 EET		(Report)		Stadium: Ankara 19 Mayıs Stadı; Referee: Orhan Cebe

22 September 1973 3	Galatasaray	1–0	Adanaspor	Istanbul
16:30 EET	Mustafa Ergücü 13'	(Report)		Stadium: Mithatpaşa Stadi; Attendance: 34,312; Referee: Muzaffer Sarvan

30 September 1973 4	Galatasaray SK	0–0	Fenerbahçe SK	Istanbul
16:15 EET		(Report)		Stadium: Mithatpaşa Stadi; Attendance: 43,068; Referee: Sedat Özselçuk

7 October 1973 5	Eskişehirspor	2–0	Galatasaray SK	Eskişehir
16:00 EET	Burhan İpek 37'; Fethi Heper 48'	(Report)		Stadium: Eskişehir Atatürk Stadı; Referee: Fehmi Pazarcı

20 October 1973 6	Galatasaray SK	1–0	Göztepe SK	Istanbul
16:00 EET	Mustafa Ergücü 59'	(Report)		Stadium: Mithatpaşa Stadi; Attendance: 22,988; Referee: Ziya Türkdoğan

28 October 1973 7	Samsunspor	0–0	Galatasaray SK	Samsun
15:45 EET		(Report)		Stadium: Samsun City Stadium; Referee: Orhan Cebe

4 November 1973 8	Beşiktaş J.K.	2–1	Galatasaray SK	Istanbul
14:45 EET	Ahmet Yılmaz 6'; Tuğrul Şener 57'	(Report)	Mehmet Özgül 3'	Stadium: Mithatpaşa Stadi; Attendance: 42,081; Referee: Ertuğrul Dilek

11 November 1973 9	Galatasaray SK	1–0	Altay SK	Istanbul
14:30 EET	Tuncay Temeller 73' (pen.)	(Report)		Stadium: Mithatpaşa Stadi; Attendance: 40,808; Referee: Ziya Türkdoğan

25 November 1973 10	Adana Demirspor	0–0	Galatasaray SK	Adana
14:00 EET		(Report)		Stadium: 5 Ocak Stadi; Referee: Orhan Cebe

1 December 1973 11	Galatasaray SK	1–0	Kayserispor	Istanbul
14:15 EET	Şevki Şenlen 61'	(Report)		Stadium: Mithatpaşa Stadi; Attendance: 21,455; Referee: Fehmi Pazarcı

15 December 1973 12	Vefa SK	0–1	Galatasaray SK	Istanbul
14:00 EET		(Report)	Mehmet Özgül 17'	Stadium: Mithatpaşa Stadi; Attendance: 25,128; Referee: Sedat Özselçuk

23 December 1973 13	Mersin İdmanyurdu	0–0	Galatasaray SK	Mersin
13:15 EET		(Report)		Stadium: Tevfik Sırrı Gür Stadı; Referee: Muzaffer Sarvan

29 December 1973 14	Galatasaray SK	4–0	Bursaspor	Istanbul
14:00 EET	Enver Ürekli 13'; Mehmet Özgül 30'; Tuncay Temeller 69'; Mustafa Ergücü 90'	(Report)		Stadium: Mithatpaşa Stadi; Attendance: 24,710; Referee: Fehmi Pazarcı

9 January 1974 15	Giresunspor	0–0	Galatasaray SK	Giresun
16:00 EET		(Report)		Stadium: Atatürk Stadi; Referee: Yılgör Öktem

10 February 1974 16	Boluspor	1–0	Galatasaray	Bolu
14:15 EET	Rıdvan Ertan 20' (pen.)	(Report)		Stadium: Bolu Atatürk Stadi; Referee: Orhan Cebe

17 February 1974 17	Galatasaray SK	3–0	MKE Ankaragücü	Istanbul
14:30 EET	Bülent Ünder 19'; Mehmet Özgül 55', 83'	(Report)		Stadium: Inönü Stadi; Attendance: 38,632; Referee: Fehmi Pazarcı

24 February 1974 18	Adanaspor	0–0	Galatasaray SK	Adana
13:30 EET		(Report)		Stadium: Adana 5 Ocak Stadı; Referee: Talat Tokat

3 March 1974 19	Fenerbahçe SK	2–1	Galatasaray SK	Istanbul
14:30 EET	Ersoy Sandalcı 35'; Osman Arpacıoğlu 40'	(Report)	Gökmen Özdenak 52'	Stadium: Inönü Stadi; Attendance: 30,485; Referee: Ertuğrul Dilek

9 March 1974 20	Galatasaray SK	3–0	Eskişehirspor	Istanbul
15:00 EET	Ahmet Akkuş 17'; Mehmet Özgül 47'; Tuncay Temeller 87'	(Report)		Stadium: Inönü Stadi; Attendance: 32,853; Referee: Sabahattin Ladikli

17 March 1974 21	Göztepe SK	1–1	Galatasaray SK	İzmir
15:15 EET	Mehmet Akpınar 76'	(Report)	Enver Ürekli 89'	Stadium: İzmir Atatürk Stadium; Attendance: 23,284; Referee: Macit Sarıdana

24 March 1974 22	Galatasaray SK	2–0	Samsunspor	Istanbul
15:00 EET	Tarık Küpoğlu 45'; Gökmen Özdenak 85'	(Report)		Stadium: Inönü Stadi; Attendance: 30,000; Referee: Ertuğrul Aybay

31 March 1974 23	Galatasaray SK	0–1	Beşiktaş JK	Istanbul
15:00 EET		(Report)	Vedat Okyar 60' (pen.)	Stadium: Inönü Stadi; Attendance: 21,732; Referee: Ertuğrul Dilek

7 April 1974 24	Altay SK	0–1	Galatasaray	İzmir
16:00 EET		(Report)	Mehmet Oğuz 54'	Stadium: İzmir Atatürk Stadium; Referee: Nevzat Tansuk

13 April 1974 25	Galatasaray SK	0–1	Adana Demirspor	Istanbul
16:00 EET		(Report)	Necati Göçmen 10'	Stadium: Inönü Stadi; Attendance: 23,905; Referee: Fehmi Pazarcı

21 April 1974 26	Kayserispor	2–0	Galatasaray SK	Kayserispor
16:00 EET	Metin Ülgen 57'; Mustafa Yücel 73'	(Report)		Stadium: Kayseri Atatürk Stadı; Referee: Talat Tokat

27 April 1974 27	Galatasaray SK	0–1	Vefa SK	Istanbul
16:00 EET	Mustafa Ergücü 15'	(Report)	Çetin Aktulgalı 28'; Yakup Kaptan 82'	Stadium: Inönü Stadi; Attendance: 8,905; Referee: Ahmet Bagatır

12 May 1974 28	Galatasaray SK	2–0	Mersin İdmanyurdu	Istanbul
16:00 EET	Metin Kurt 63'; Ahmet Akkuş 82'	(Report)		Stadium: Inönü Stadi; Attendance: 4.245; Referee: Muzaffer Sarvan

19 May 1974 29	Bursaspor	0–0	Galatasaray SK	Bursa
16:00 EET		(Report)		Stadium: Bursa Atatürk Stadı; Referee: Nihat Özbirgül

26 May 1974 30	Galatasaray SK	2–1	Giresunspor	Istanbul
17:30 EET	Tuncay Temeller 43'; Mustafa Ergücü 71'	(Report)	Aydın Güleş 25' (o.g.)	Stadium: Inönü Stadi; Attendance: 16,253; Referee: Mazhar Kerestecioğlu

== Turkiye Kupasi ==
=== 1/4 Final ===
14 February 1974 1st leg	Galatasaray SK	1–1	Turanspor	Istanbul
15:00 EET	Engin Verel 50'	(Report)	Nevruz Şerif 48'	Stadium: Mithatpaşa Stadi; Attendance: 15,869; Referee: İbrahim Fırla

27 February 1974 2nd leg	Turanspor	0–1	Galatasaray SK	Ankara
14:00 EET		(Report)	Gökmen Özdenak 46'	Stadium: Ankara 19 Mayıs Stadı; Referee: Fehmi Pazarcı

=== 1/2 Final ===
20 March 1974 1st leg	Fenerbahçe SK	0–0	Galatasaray SK	Istanbul
15:00 EET		(Report)		Stadium: Mithatpaşa Stadi; Attendance: 43,442; Referee: Doğan Babacan

17 April 1974 2nd leg	Galatasaray SK	0–3	Fenerbahçe SK	Istanbul
15:30 EET		(Report)	Cemil Turan 43', 48'; Alpaslan Eratlı 88'	Stadium: Mithatpaşa Stadi; Attendance: 25,201; Referee: Sedat Özselçuk

== European Cup ==
=== 1st round ===
19 September 1973 1	Atlético Madrid	0–0	Galatasaray SK	Madrid
01:00 EET		(Report)		Stadium: Estadio Vicente Calderón; Attendance: 34,259; Referee: (Netherlands) Charles Corver

3 October 1973 1	Galatasaray SK	0–1 (a.e.t.)	Atlético Madrid	Istanbul
EET		(Report)	Ignacio Salcedo 100'	Stadium: Mithatpaşa Stadi; Attendance: 37,460; Referee: (Germany) Günter Männig

== Friendly match ==
=== TSYD Kupası ===
4 August 1973 1	Beşiktaş JK	2–1	Galatasaray SK	Istanbul
20:30 EET	Lütfü Isıgöllü 2'; Necmi Perekli 66'	(Report)	Şevki Şenlen 22'	Stadium: Mithatpaşa Stadi; Attendance: 43,127; Referee: Sedat Özselçuk

11 August 1973 1	Galatasaray SK	2–2	Fenerbahçe SK	Istanbul
20:30 EET	Mehmet Oğuz 73'; Mehmet Özgül 82'	(Report)	Cemil Turan 30'; Alpaslan Eratlı 64' (pen.)	Stadium: Mithatpaşa Stadi; Attendance: 43,356; Referee: Ertuğrul Dilek

=== 50.Yıl Kupası ===
25 August 1973 İzmir Grubu	Galatasaray SK	1–0	Eskişehirspor	İzmir
20:30 EET	Tuncay Temeller 23' (pen.)	(Report)		Stadium: İzmir Atatürk Stadium; Referee: İbrahim Fırla

26 August 1973 Grup Finalleri	Altay SK	0–2	Galatasaray	İzmir
20:30 EET		(Report)	Gökmen Özdenak 7'; Mehmet Özgül 53'	Stadium: İzmir Atatürk Stadium; Attendance: 15,300; Referee: Muzaffer Sarvan

30 October 1973 Final	Galatasaray SK	0–0	Fenerbahçe SK	Ankara
15:00 EET		(Report)		Stadium: Ankara 19 Mayıs Stadı; Attendance: 26,622; Referee: Macit Sarıdana

=== Uğur Köken Testimonial match ===
30 August 1973 1	Galatasaray SK	1–1	Beşiktaş JK	Istanbul
15:00 EET	Gökmen Özdenak 33'	(Report)	Necmi Perekli 52'	Stadium: İnönü Stadı; Attendance: 20,779; Referee: Kemal Akay

== Attendance ==
Competition	Av. Att.	Total Att.
1. Lig	26,604	399,056
Türkiye Kupası	20,535	41,070
European Cup	37,460	37,460
Total	26,533	477,586
