= 1977–78 Galatasaray S.K. season =

Galatasaray
1977–78 season
- President: (Turkey) Selahattin Beyazıt
- Manager: (England) Malcolm Allison (until 2 October 1977) (Turkey) Fethi Demircan
- Stadium: Inönü Stadi
- 1. Lig: 3rd
- Türkiye Kupası: 1/4 final
- Top goalscorer: League: Gökmen Özdenak (16); All: Gökmen Özdenak (19)
- Highest home attendance: 41,074 vs Trabzonspor (1. Lig, 12 March 1978)
- Lowest home attendance: 7,555 vs İzmirspor (Turkiye Kupasi, 7 December 1977)
- Average home league attendance: 25,882
Home colours	Away colours	Third colours

The 1977–78 season was Galatasaray's 74th in existence and the club's 20th consecutive season in the Turkish First Football League. This article shows statistics of the club's players in the season, and also lists all matches that the club have played in the season.

== Squad statistics ==
No.	Pos.	Name	1. Lig		Türkiye Kupası		Total	
No.	Pos.	Name	Apps	Goals	Apps	Goals	Apps	Goals
-	GK	(Socialist Federal Republic of Yugoslavia) Boško Kajganić	6	0	0	0	6	0
-	GK	(Turkey) Bahattin Demircan	16	0	5	0	21	0
-	GK	(Turkey) Nihat Akbay	10	0	1	0	11	0
-	DF	(Turkey) Fatih Terim	29	2	5	0	34	2
-	DF	(Turkey) Güngör Tekin	29	2	5	0	34	2
-	DF	(Turkey) Cüneyt Tanman	28	3	5	0	33	3
-	DF	(Turkey) Erdoğan Arıca	28	0	4	1	32	1
-	DF	(Turkey) Müfit Erkasap	30	0	6	0	36	0
-	DF	(Turkey) Rıdvan Kılıç	7	0	3	0	10	0
-	DF	(Turkey) Ali Yavaş	4	0	1	0	5	0
-	MF	(Turkey) Bülent Ünder	2	0	1	1	3	1
-	MF	(Turkey) Mehmet Oğuz (C)	24	1	5	2	29	3
-	MF	(Turkey) Gürcan Aday	29	0	5	0	34	0
-	MF	(Turkey) Turgay İnal	14	1	4	0	18	1
-	FW	(Turkey) Engin Çınar	0	0	1	0	1	0
-	FW	(Turkey) Ergun Ortakçı	3	0	0	0	3	0
-	FW	(Turkey) Gökmen Özdenak (vice-captain)	26	16	6	3	32	19
-	FW	(Turkey) Öner Kılıç	29	5	5	0	34	5
-	FW	(Turkey) Tacettin Ergürsel	24	4	5	0	29	4
-	FW	(Turkey) Şükrü Tetik	14	1	1	0	15	1
-	FW	(Turkey) Murat Kandil	10	0	2	0	12	0
-	FW	(Turkey) Mehmet Özgül	11	2	2	0	13	2

=== Players in / out ===
==== In ====
Pos.	Nat.	Name	Age	Moving to
DF	(Turkey)	Erdoğan Arıca	23	Orduspor
FW	(Turkey)	Tacettin Ergürsel	27	Bursaspor
MF	(Turkey)	Gürcan Aday	19	Tofaş SK
GK	(Turkey)	Bahattin Demircan	21	İzmirspor
DF	(Turkey)	Furkan Ölçer	21	Vefa SK
MF	(Turkey)	Turgay İnal	19	Çanakkalespor
FW	(Turkey)	Fevzi Kezan	25	Giresunspor
GK	(Socialist Federal Republic of Yugoslavia)	Boško Kajganić	28	Red Star Belgrade
FW	(Turkey)	Murat Kandil	22	Konya İdman Yurdu

==== Out ====
Pos.	Nat.	Name	Age	Moving to
DF	(Turkey)	Ekrem Günalp	30	Retired
FW	(Turkey)	Şevki Şenlen	28	Fenerbahçe SK
FW	(Turkey)	Zafer Dinçer	21	Orduspor
DF	(Turkey)	Furkan Ölçer	21	Vefa SK
DF	(Turkey)	Furkan Ölçer	21	Vefa SK
FW	(Turkey)	Nurettin Yılmaz	21	Adanaspor
FW	(Turkey)	Fevzi Kezan	25	Giresunspor
DF	(Turkey)	Faruk Aktaş	21	Orduspor
GK	(Turkey)	Doğan Özdenak	23	
DF	(Turkey)	Arif Kuşdoğan	21	Rizespor

== 1. Lig ==
=== Standings ===
Pos	Team	Pld	W	D	L	GF	GA	GD	Pts	Qualification or relegation
1	Fenerbahçe (C)	30	17	8	5	48	24	+24	42	Qualification to European Cup first round
2	Trabzonspor	30	18	5	7	42	16	+26	41	
3	Galatasaray	30	13	12	5	38	26	+12	38	Qualification to UEFA Cup first round
4	Adanaspor	30	12	11	7	28	31	−3	35	Qualification to UEFA Cup first round
5	Beşiktaş	30	12	8	10	33	29	+4	32	Invitation to Balkans Cup

Rules for classification: 1) points; 2) goal difference; 3) number of goals scored.
(C) Champions

=== Matches ===
28 August 1977 1	Galatasaray SK	1–0	Zonguldakspor	Istanbul
17:00 EET	Gökmen Özdenak 55'	(Report)		Stadium: Inönü Stadi; Attendance: 40,243; Referee: Ertuğrul Aybay

4 September 1977 2	Eskişehirspor	2–2	Galatasaray SK	Eskişehir
17:00 EET	Metin Parlaroğlu 6' (pen.); Nejat Dinçer 14'	(Report)	Gökmen Özdenak 21', 44'	Stadium: Eskişehir Atatürk Stadium; Referee: Talat Tokat

11 September 1977 3	Galatasaray	1–0	Boluspor	Istanbul
17:00 EET	Şükrü Tetik 28'	(Report)		Stadium: Inönü Stadi; Attendance: 33,094; Referee: İhsan Türe

26 September 1977 4	Trabzonspor	0–0	Galatasaray	Trabzon
15:45 EET		(Report)		Stadium: Hüseyin Avni Aker Stadium; Referee: Ziya Türkdoğan

2 October 1977 5	Galatasaray	0–2	Fenerbahçe SK	Istanbul
16:15 EET		(Report)	Cemil Turan 9'; Tuna Güneysu 16'	Stadium: Inönü Stadi; Attendance: 39,265; Referee: Hilmi Ok

9 October 1977 6	Mersin İdmanyurdu	1–1	Galatasaray	Mersin
14:45 EET	Müjdat Karanfilci 30'	(Report)	Mehmet Özgül 87'	Stadium: Tevfik Sırrı Gür Stadium; Referee: Yılmaz Önen

16 October 1977 7	Galatasaray SK	2–0	MKE Ankaragücü	Istanbul
14:30 EET	Tacettin Ergürsel 60'; Mehmet Özgül 72'	(Report)		Stadium: Inönü Stadi; Attendance: 17,107; Referee: Orhan Cebe

5 November 1977 8	Galatasaray	0–0	Orduspor	Istanbul
14:45 EET		(Report)		Stadium: Inönü Stadi; Referee: Talat Tokat

20 November 1977 9	Samsunspor	0–0	Galatasaray SK	Samsun
13:30 EET		(Report)		Stadium: 19 Mayıs Stadı; Referee: Orhan Cebe

4 December 1977 10	Altay SK	2–1	Galatasaray	Izmir
14:15 EET	Bora Öztürk 10', 26'	(Report)	Cüneyt Tanman 16'	Stadium: Alsancak Stadı; Referee: Nihat Özbirgül

10 December 1977 11	Galatasaray	4–0	Adanaspor	Istanbul
14:15 EET	Güngör Tekin 36'; Tacettin Ergürsel 38'; Cüneyt Tanman 46'; Fatih Terim 53'	(Report)		Stadium: Inönü Stadi; Attendance: 26,000; Referee: Ertuğrul Aybay

18 December 1977 12	Galatasaray SK	3–1	Beşiktaş JK	Istanbul
14:00 EET	Gökmen Özdenak 61', 86'; Öner Kılıç 69'	(Report)	Sava Paunović 72' (pen.)	Stadium: Inönü Stadi; Attendance: 37,871; Referee: Ertuğrul Dilek

25 December 1977 13	Diyarbakırspor	1–1	Galatasaray	Diyarbakır
13:15 EET	Tuncay Temeller 80'	(Report)	Gökmen Özdenak 68'	Stadium: Diyarbakır Atatürk Stadium; Referee: Ertuğrul Aybay

1 January 1978 14	Galatasaray SK	2–0	Bursaspor	Istanbul
14:15 EET	Tacettin Ergürsel 12'; Cüneyt Tanman 89'	(Report)		Stadium: Inönü Stadi; Attendance: 16,231; Referee: Ziya Türkdoğan

8 January 1978 15	Adana Demirspor	1–0	Galatasaray	Adana
13:30 EET	İsmail Güner 61'	(Report)		Stadium: Adana 5 Ocak Stadium; Referee: Yılmaz Önen

19 February 1978 16	Zonguldakspor	0–0	Galatasaray	Zonguldak
14:15 EET		(Report)		Stadium: Kemal Köksal Stadium; Referee: Yavuz Tunç

26 February 1978 17	Galatasaray	1–0	Eskişehirspor	Istanbul
14:30 EET	Fatih Terim 34'	(Report)		Stadium: Inönü Stadi; Attendance: 28,463; Referee: Talat Tokat

5 March 1978 18	Boluspor	3–0	Galatasaray	Bolu
14:45 EET	Halil İbrahim Eren 15', 90'; Çetin Erdoğan 65'	(Report)		Stadium: Bolu Atatürk Stadium; Referee: Yılgör Öktem

12 March 1978 19	Galatasaray SK	2–1	Trabzonspor	Istanbul
15:00 EET	Gökmen Özdenak 30', 42'	(Report)	Mehmet Ekşi 41'	Stadium: Inönü Stadi; Attendance: 41,074; Referee: Nihat Özbirgül

19 March 1978 20	Fenerbahçe SK	2–2	Galatasaray SK	Istanbul
15:00 EET	Cemil Turan 30'; Radomir Antić 86'	(Report)	Gökmen Özdenak 7'; Mehmet Oğuz 84'	Stadium: Inönü Stadi; Attendance: 41,838; Referee: Hilmi Ok

26 March 1978 21	Galatasaray SK	2–1	Mersin İdmanyurdu	Istanbul
15:00 EET	Gökmen Özdenak 20'; Güngör Tekin 76'	(Report)	Hikmet Erön 65'	Stadium: Inönü Stadi; Attendance: 13,724; Referee: Yavuz Tunç

2 April 1978 22	MKE Ankaragücü	3–1	Galatasaray SK	Ankara
16:00 EET	Nazmi Erdenerin 33', 68'; İskender Atasoy 44'	(Report)	Oktay Erül 85' (o.g.)	Stadium: 19 Mayıs Stadı; Referee: Müşfik Talas

10 April 1978 23	Orduspor	0–1	Galatasaray	Ordu
16:00 EET		(Report)	Öner Kılıç 2'	Stadium: Ordu 19 Eylül Stadium; Referee: Ziya Türkdoğan

15 April 1978 24	Galatasaray SK	2–1	Samsunspor	Istanbul
16:00 EET	Tacettin Ergürsel 65'; Öner Kılıç 84'	(Report)	Adem Kurukaya 75'	Stadium: Inönü Stadi; Attendance: 15,977; Referee: Talat Tokat

22 April 1978 25	Galatasaray	0–0	Altay SK	Istanbul
15:00 EET		(Report)		Stadium: Inönü Stadi; Attendance: 15,252; Referee: Ziya Türkdoğan

30 April 1978 26	Adanaspor	0–0	Galatasaray SK	Adana
15:00 EET		(Report)		Stadium: Adana 5 Ocak Stadı; Referee: Nihat Özbirgül

7 May 1978 27	Beşiktaş J.K.	1–1	Galatasaray	Istanbul
15:00 EET	Şaban Kartal 27'	(Report)	Gökmen Özdenak 71'	Stadium: Inönü Stadi; Attendance: 16,575; Referee: Erkan Göksel

14 May 1978 28	Galatasaray	3–0	Diyarbakırspor	Istanbul
16:00 EET	Gökmen Özdenak 14', 85'; Turgay İnal 18'	(Report)		Stadium: Inönü Stadi; Attendance: 13,448; Referee: İhsan Türe

21 May 1978 29	Bursaspor	1–1	Galatasaray	Bursa
16:00 EET	Sinan Bür 65'	(Report)	Öner Kılıç 11'	Stadium: Bursa Atatürk Stadı; Referee: Ertuğrul Aybay

27 May 1978 30	Galatasaray SK	4–3	Adana Demirspor	Istanbul
16:00 EET	Gökmen Özdenak 4', 44' (pen.), 62'; Öner Kılıç 15'	(Report)	Rasin Gürcan 21', 60'; Ahmet Yaşar 78'	Stadium: Inönü Stadi; Attendance: 8,642; Referee: Fehmi Pazarcı

== Turkiye Kupasi ==
=== Round of 32 ===
7 December 1977 1	Galatasaray	4–0	İzmirspor (3)	Istanbul
14:15 EET	Erdoğan Arıca 23'; Gökmen Özdenak 42', 44'; Mehmet Oğuz 73'	(Report)		Stadium: Inönü Stadi; Attendance: 7,555; Referee: Ata Bahri

21 December 1977 2	İzmirspor (3)	0–1	Galatasaray	İzmir
13:45 EET		(Report)	Bülent Ünder 77'	Stadium: Atatürk Stadı; Attendance: 1,390; Referee: Oktay Taner

=== Round of 16 ===
15 February 1978 1	Galatasaray	1–0	Gaziantepspor (2)	Istanbul
14:30 EET	Mehmet Oğuz 51'	(Report)		Stadium: Inönü Stadi; Attendance: 9,669; Referee: Yılmaz Dinçel

1 March 1978 2	Gaziantepspor (2)	0–2	Galatasaray	Gaziantep
13:45 EET		(Report)	Ünsal Özer 70'; Gökmen Özdenak 81'	Stadium: Kamil Ocak Stadı; Referee: Orhan Cebe

=== 1/4 final ===
15 March 1978 1	Galatasaray	0–1	Kayserispor (2)	Istanbul
13:00 EET		(Report)	Yılmaz Yavman 82'	Stadium: Inönü Stadi; Attendance: 38,272; Referee: Celal Türk

29 March 1978 2	Kayserispor (2)	0–0	Galatasaray	Kayseri
14:00 EET		(Report)		Stadium: Atatürk Stadı; Referee: Nihat Özbirgül

== Friendly Matches ==
Kick-off listed in local time (EET)

=== Friendly match ===
7 August 1977	Galatasaray SK	1–0	Trabzonspor	Istanbul
15:00 EET	Tacettin Ergürsel 75'	(Report)		Stadium: Inönü Stadi; Referee: Nihat Özbirgül

=== TSYD Kupası ===
10 August 1977 1	Galatasaray SK	4–0	Beşiktaş JK	Istanbul
20:00 EET	Tacettin Ergürsel 10'; Öner Kılıç 26'; Şükrü Tetik 37'; Gökmen Özdenak 63'	(Report)		Stadium: Inönü Stadi; Attendance: 14,053; Referee: Güngör Tuncel

14 August 1977 2	Fenerbahçe SK	2–1	Galatasaray SK	Istanbul
20:00 EET	Yenal Kaçıra 63' (pen.); Bahri Kaya 74'	(Report)	Güngör Tekin 77'	Stadium: Inönü Stadi; Attendance: 41,243; Referee: Cumhur Demir

== Attendance ==
Competition	Av. Att.	Total Att.
1. Lig	25,882	388,229
Türkiye Kupası	18,499	55,496
Total	24,651	443,725
