= 1969–70 Galatasaray S.K. season =

Galatasaray
1969–70 season
- President: (Turkey) Selahattin Beyazıt
- Manager: (Socialist Federal Republic of Yugoslavia) Tomislav Kaloperović
- Stadium: Ali Sami Yen Stadi; Mithatpaşa Stadi
- 1.Lig: 8th
- Türkiye Kupası: 1/4 final
- European Cup: 1/4 final
- Top goalscorer: League: Gökmen Özdenak (6); All: Gökmen Özdenak (11)
- Highest home attendance: 31,543 vs Beşiktaş JK (1. Lig, 2 November 1969)
- Lowest home attendance: 3,455 vs Gençlerbirliği SK (1. Lig, 11 April 1970)
- Average home league attendance: 18,630
Home colours	Away colours

The 1969–70 season was Galatasaray's 66th in existence and the 12th consecutive season in the 1. Lig. This article shows statistics of the club's players in the season, and also lists all matches that the club have played in the season.

== Squad statistics ==
No.	Pos.	Name	1. Lig		Türkiye Kupası		European Cup		Total	
No.	Pos.	Name	Apps	Goals	Apps	Goals	Apps	Goals	Apps	Goals
1	GK	(Turkey) Yasin Özdenak	15	0	2	0	0	0	17	0
-	GK	(Turkey) Nihat Akbay	15	0	1	0	6	0	22	0
-	GK	(Turkey) Varol Ürkmez	1	0	3	0	0	0	4	0
-	DF	(Turkey) Muzaffer Sipahi	28	0	5	0	6	0	39	0
-	DF	(Turkey) Ergün Acuner	17	2	3	0	6	1	26	3
-	DF	(Turkey) Samim Yağız	15	1	5	0	0	0	20	1
-	DF	(Turkey) Ekrem Günalp	24	1	6	0	4	0	34	1
-	DF	(Turkey) İlker Erbay	1	0	0	0	0	0	1	0
-	DF	(Turkey) Hidayet Öztekin	7	0	4	0	0	0	11	0
-	DF	(Turkey) Akın Aksaçlı	25	0	5	0	5	0	35	0
-	DF	(Turkey) Ali Elveren	22	1	4	0	6	0	32	1
-	DF	(Turkey) Harun Kaya	5	0	3	0	0	0	8	0
-	MF	(Turkey) Turan Doğangün	21	4	5	0	5	0	31	4
-	MF	(Turkey) Bülent Ünder	4	0	0	0	0	0	4	0
-	MF	(Turkey) Mehmet Oğuz	18	3	4	0	6	0	28	3
-	MF	(Turkey) Talat Özkarslı(C)	13	0	3	0	6	0	22	0
-	MF	(Turkey) Faruk Uçarlar	3	0	0	0	0	0	3	0
-	FW	(Turkey) Ayhan Elmastaşoğlu	20	3	4	0	6	0	30	5
-	FW	(Turkey) Uğur Köken	22	1	3	1	6	1	31	3
-	FW	(Turkey) Mazlum Fırtına	18	1	3	0	1	0	22	1
-	FW	(Socialist Federal Republic of Yugoslavia) Ahmet Celovic	5	0	1	0	1	0	7	0
-	FW	(Turkey) Yılmaz Gökdel	8	0	1	0	0	0	9	0
-	FW	(Turkey) Bilgin Nesil	6	0	2	0	0	0	8	0
-	FW	(Turkey) Muhlis Gülen	17	1	1	0	3	0	21	1
9	FW	(Turkey) Gökmen Özdenak	24	6	4	2	4	3	32	11
-	FW	(Turkey) Olcay Başarır	3	0	1	0	0	0	4	0
-	FW	(Turkey) Feridun Öztürk	10	0	2	1	2	0	14	1

=== Players in / out ===
==== In ====
Pos.	Nat.	Name	Age	Moving from
DF	(Turkey)	Ekrem Günalp	22	Gençlerbirliği SK
FW	(Turkey)	Feridun Öztürk	24	Altay SK
FW	(Turkey)	Olcay Başarır	20	Mersin İdmanyurdu
MF	(Turkey)	Bülent Ünder	20	Galatasaray A2
DF	(Turkey)	Samim Yağız	19	Galatasaray A2
MF	(Turkey)	Harun Kaya	18	Galatasaray A2

==== Out ====
Pos.	Nat.	Name	Age	Moving from
FW	(Turkey)	Metin Oktay	33	retired
FW	(Turkey)	Ergin Gürses	27	Bursaspor

== 1.Lig ==
=== Standings ===
Pos	Team	Pld	W	D	L	GF	GA	GD	Pts
6	Samsunspor	30	11	9	10	24	28	−4	31
7	Bursaspor	30	10	10	10	26	20	+6	30
8	Galatasaray	30	10	10	10	27	21	+6	30
9	Beşiktaş	30	10	10	10	26	26	0	30
10	İstanbulspor	30	10	9	11	30	27	+3	29

Rules for classification: 1) points; 2) goal difference; 3) number of goals scored.

=== Matches ===
20 September 1969 1	Galatasaray SK	2–0	Altınordu F.K.	Istanbul
16:15 EET	Gökmen Özdenak 13'; Uğur Köken 62'	(Report)		Stadium: Mithatpaşa Stadi; Attendance: 14,369; Referee: Veli Necdet Arığ

5 October 1969 2	Galatasaray SK	4–1	Vefa SK	Istanbul
15:45 EET	Savaş Maloğlu 7' (o.g.); Ayhan Elmastaşoğlu 13', 78'; Mehmet Oğuz 18'	(Report)	Ertuğrul Atilla 85'	Stadium: Mithatpaşa Stadi; Attendance: 25,833; Referee: Ahmet Bagatır

19 October 1969 3	Galatasaray SK	2–1	Mersin İdmanyurdu	Istanbul
15:15 EET	Refik Çoğum 22' (o.g.); Mehmet Oğuz 61'	(Report)	Tarık Kutver 28'	Stadium: Mithatpaşa Stadi; Attendance: 21,400; Referee: Cezmi Başar

26 October 1969 4	MKE Ankaragücü	2–0	Galatasaray SK	Ankara
15:00 EET	Metin Yılmaz 70'; Mehmet Uğursal 81'	(Report)		Stadium: 19 Mayıs Stadı; Referee: Muzaffer Sarvan

2 November 1969 5	Galatasaray SK	1–1	Beşiktaş JK	Istanbul
15:00 EET	Gökmen Özdenak 15'	(Report)	Nihat Yayöz 17'	Stadium: Mithatpaşa Stadi; Attendance: 31,543; Referee: Zeki Gürkan

22 November 1969 6	Gençlerbirliği SK	0–3	Galatasaray SK	Ankara
14:15 EET		(Report)	Gökmen Özdenak 39'; Ekrem Günalp 84'; Ali Elveren 88'	Stadium: 19 Mayıs Stadı; Referee: Abdi Parlakay

30 November 1969 7	Galatasaray SK	0–0	Ankara Demirspor	Istanbul
14:15 EET		(Report)		Stadium: Ali Sami Yen Stadi; Attendance: 20,000; Referee: İbrahim Fırla

7 December 1969 8	Galatasaray SK	1–0	Fenerbahçe SK	Istanbul
14:15 EET	Gökmen Özdenak 40'	(Report)		Stadium: Ali Sami Yen Stadi; Attendance: 25,151; Referee: Ömer Karadağ

14 December 1969 9	Bursaspor	2–0	Galatasaray SK	Bursa
14:15 EET	Vahit Kolukısa 42', 62'	(Report)		Stadium: Atatürk Stadı; Referee: Sabahattin Ladikli

21 December 1969 10	Göztepe SK	2–1	Galatasaray SK	İzmir
14:15 EET	Fevzi Zemzem 5'; Ekrem Günalp 48' (o.g.)	(Report)	Ergün Acuner 15'	Stadium: Alsancak Stadium; Referee: Veli Necdet Arığ

27 December 1969 11	Galatasaray SK	0–1	Altay SK	Istanbul
14:15 EET		(Report)	Necdet Tunca 43'	Stadium: Mithatpaşa Stadi; Attendance: 15,000; Referee: Ertuğrul Dilek

3 January 1970 12	Galatasaray SK	1–1	PTT SK	Istanbul
14:45 EET	Ayhan Elmastaşoğlu 89'	(Report)	Aydın Güleş 90'	Stadium: Mithatpaşa Stadi; Attendance: 14,500; Referee: Mustafa Gerçeker

11 January 1970 13	Eskişehirspor	1–0	Galatasaray SK	Eskişehir
14:00 EET	Vahap Özbayer 79'	(Report)		Stadium: Atatürk Stadı); Referee: Veli Necdet Arığ

18 January 1970 14	Galatasaray SK	2–3	Istanbulspor	Istanbul
14:15 EET	Gökmen Özdenak 18'; Ergün Acuner 86'	(Report)	Ömer Ünal 10'; Kosta Kasapoğlu 61'; Yalçın Saner 77'	Stadium: Ali Sami Yen Stadi; Attendance: 17,000; Referee: Nejat Şener

25 January 1970 15	Samsunspor	0–0	Galatasaray SK	Samsun
14:15 EET		(Report)		Stadium: Samsun City Stadium; Referee: Cezmi Başar

22 February 1970 16	Altınordu F.K.	0–0	Galatasaray SK	İzmir
15:15 EET		(Report)		Stadium: Alsancak Stadium; Referee: Ertuğrul Dilek

1 March 1970 17	Istanbulspor	0–0	Galatasaray SK	Istanbul
14:30 EET		(Report)		Stadium: Mithatpaşa Stadi; Attendance: 20,088; Referee: Doğan Babacan

8 March 1970 18	Vefa SK	0–2	Galatasaray SK	Istanbul
15:00 EET		(Report)	Turan Doğangün 72'; Mehmet Oğuz 75' (pen.)	Stadium: Ali Sami Yen Stadi; Referee: Ömer Karadağ

22 March 1970 19	Galatasaray SK	2–0	MKE Ankaragücü	Istanbul
15:00 EET	Mazlum Fırtına 16'; Turan Doğangün 23'	(Report)		Stadium: Ali Sami Yen Stadi; Attendance: 20,000; Referee: İbrahim Fırla

29 March 1970 20	Beşiktaş JK	0–0	Galatasaray SK	Istanbul
15:00 EET		(Report)		Stadium: Ali Sami Yen Stadi; Attendance: 11,818; Referee: Nejat Şener

4 April 1970 21	Galatasaray SK	2–0	Samsunspor	Istanbul
15:00 EET	Muhlis Gülen 40'; Samim Yağız 73'	(Report)		Stadium: Mithatpaşa Stadi; Attendance: 14,500; Referee: Nevzat Tansuk

11 April 1970 22	Galatasaray SK	1–0	Gençlerbirliği SK	Istanbul
15:15 EET	Turan Doğangün 38'	(Report)		Stadium: Ali Sami Yen Stadi; Attendance: 3,455; Referee: Ferdinand Biwersi

19 April 1970 23	Ankara Demirspor	0–1	Galatasaray SK	Ankara
15:00 EET		(Report)	Turan Doğangün 66'	Stadium: 19 Mayıs Stadı; Referee: Ertuğrul Dilek

26 April 1970 24	Fenerbahçe SK	1–0	Galatasaray SK	Istanbul
15:15 EET	Nedim Doğan 60'	(Report)		Stadium: Mithatpaşa Stadi; Referee: Alois Kessler

3 May 1970 25	Galatasaray SK	0–0	Bursaspor	Istanbul
15:30 EET		(Report)		Stadium: Mithatpaşa Stadi; Attendance: 8,256

10 May 1970 26	Galatasaray SK	0–0	Göztepe SK	Istanbul
15:30 EET		(Report)		Stadium: Ali Sami Yen Stadi; Attendance: 4,000; Referee: Nihat Özbirgül

17 May 1970 27	Altay SK	1–0	Galatasaray SK	İzmir
15:45 EET	Ayfer Elmastaşoğlu 46' (pen.)	(Report)		Stadium: Alsancak Stadium; Referee: Hamza Özdağ

24 May 1970 28	PTT SK	1–0	Galatasaray SK	Ankara
15:30 EET	Aydın Güleş 53'	(Report)		Stadium: 19 Mayıs Stadı; Referee: Muzaffer Sarvan

27 May 1970 29	Mersin İdmanyurdu	1–0	Galatasaray SK	Mersin
15:30 EET	İbrahim Arayıcı 51'	(Report)		Stadium: Tevfik Sırrı Gür Stadı; Referee: Cezmi Başar

30 May 1970 30	Galatasaray SK	2–2	Eskişehirspor	Istanbul
15:30 EET	İsmail Arca 66' (o.g.); Gökmen Özdenak 81'	(Report)	Ender Konca 54', 56'	Stadium: Ali Sami Yen Stadi; Attendance: 16,000; Referee: Ziya Türkdoğan

== Türkiye Kupası ==
Kick-off listed in local time (EET)

=== 1st round ===
8 October 1969 1	İzmir Denizgücü SK (A)	0–1	Galatasaray SK	İzmir
20:00 EET		(Report)	Mustafa 36' (o.g.)	Stadium: Alsancak Stadium; Referee: Necdet Oralalp

22 October 1969 2	Galatasaray SK	1–0	İzmir Denizgücü SK (A)	Istanbul
19:30 EET	Feridun Öztürk 27'	(Report)		Stadium: Mithatpaşa Stadi; Attendance: 5,162; Referee: Nihat Panter

=== 2nd round ===
1 February 1970 1	Galatasaray SK	3–0	Vefa SK	Istanbul
14:15 EET	Gökmen Özdenak 54', 68'; Uğur Köken 82'	(Report)		Stadium: Ali Sami Yen Stadı; Attendance: 8,638; Referee: Zeki Gürkan

8 February 1970 1	Vefa SK	0–0	Galatasaray SK	Istanbul
14:45 EET		(Report)		Stadium: Mithatpaşa Stadi; Referee: Sedat Özselçuk

=== 1/4 Final ===
1 April 1970 1	Eskişehirspor	2–0	Galatasaray SK	Eskişehir
14:45 EET	Kamuran Yavuz 25'; Vahap Özbayer 68'	(Report)		Stadium: Atatürk Stadı); Referee: Paul Kindervater

8 April 1970 2	Galatasaray SK	0–0	Eskişehirspor	Istanbul
19:30 EET		(Report)		Stadium: Mithatpaşa Stadi; Attendance: 23,550; Referee: Gerd Siepe

== European Cup ==
=== First round ===
17 September 1969 1	Galatasaray SK	2–0	Waterford F.C.	Istanbul
EET	Gökmen Özdenak 20', 35'	(Report)		Stadium: Mithatpaşa Stadi; Attendance: 30,000; Referee: (Romania) Andrei Radulescu

1 October 1969 1	Waterford F.C.	2–3	Galatasaray SK	Dublin
EET	Philip Buck 57'; John Morley 79'	(Report)	Uğur Köken 27'; Gökmen Özdenak 68'; Ayhan Elmastaşoğlu 71'	Stadium: Lansdowne Road; Attendance: 9,000; Referee: (Norway) Kare Sirevaag

=== Second round ===
12 November 1969 1	FC Spartak Trnava	1–0	Galatasaray SK	Trnava
EET	Dušan Kabát 50'	(Report)		Stadium: Spartak Stadium; Attendance: 11,000; Referee: (Scotland) William Joseph Mullan

26 November 1969 2	Galatasaray SK	1–0	FC Spartak Trnava	Istanbul
EET	Ergün Acuner 70'	(Report)		Stadium: Mithatpaşa Stadi; Attendance: 26,500; Referee: (Spain) Gaspar Pintado Viu

=== 1/4 final ===
4 March 1970 1	Galatasaray SK	1–1	Legia Warsaw	Istanbul
EET	Ayhan Elmastaşoğlu 47'	(Report)	Lucjan Brychczy 37'	Stadium: Mithatpaşa Stadi; Attendance: 30,635; Referee: (France) Roger Mâchin

18 March 1970 1	Legia Warsaw	2–0	Galatasaray SK	Warsaw
EET	Lucjan Brychczy 10', 55'	(Report)		Stadium: Stadion Wojska Polskiego; Attendance: 18,374; Referee: (England) James Finney

== Friendly Matches ==
=== Metin Oktay Testimonial match ===
23 August 1969	Galatasaray SK	1–1	Fenerbahçe SK	Istanbul
20:00 EET	Ergün Acuner 69' (pen.)	(Report)	Ogün Altıparmak 62' (pen.)	Stadium: Mithatpaşa Stadi; Referee: Hakkı Çaktırma

=== TSYD Kupası ===
3 September 1969 1	Galatasaray SK	0–0	Fenerbahçe SK	Istanbul
20:00 EET		(Report)		Stadium: Mithatpaşa Stadi; Referee: Zeki Gürkan

6 September 1969 2	Beşiktaş JK	1–1	Galatasaray SK	Istanbul
17:00 EET	Zeki Temizer 61'	(Report)	Yılmaz Gökdel 88'	Stadium: Mithatpaşa Stadi; Referee: Nazif Oturgan

== Attendance ==
Competition	Av. Att.	Total Att.
1. Lig	18,630	75,518
Türkiye Kupası	12,450	37,350
European Cup	29,045	87,135
Total	19,900	199,003
