= 1979–80 Galatasaray S.K. season =

Galatasaray
1979–80 season
- President: (Turkey) Ali Uras
- Manager: (Turkey) Coşkun Özarı (until 30 September 1979) (Turkey) Turgay Şeren (until 10 May 1980) (Turkey) Tamer Kaptan
- Stadium: Inönü Stadi
- 1. Lig: 9th
- Türkiye Kupası: runner-up
- UEFA Cup: 1st round
- Top goalscorer: League: Gökmen Özdenak (7); All: Gökmen Özdenak (8)
- Highest home attendance: 40,032 vs Beşiktaş JK (2 March 1980)
- Lowest home attendance: 9,708 vs Gaziantepspor (5 March 1980)
- Average home league attendance: 28,718
Home colours	Away colours	Third colours

The 1979–80 season was Galatasaray's 76th in existence and the club's 22nd consecutive season in the Turkish First Football League. This article shows statistics of the club's players in the season, and also lists all matches that the club have played in the season.

== Squad statistics ==
No.	Pos.	Name	1. Lig		Türkiye Kupası		UEFA Cup		Total	
No.	Pos.	Name	Apps	Goals	Apps	Goals	Apps	Goals	Apps	Goals
-	GK	(Turkey) Eser Özaltındere	22	0	7	0	2	0	31	0
-	GK	(Turkey) Mustafa Cevlan	7	0	2	0	0	0	9	0
-	GK	(Turkey) Haydar Erdoğan	1	0	0	0	0	0	1	0
-	DF	(Turkey) Fatih Terim (C)	30	2	9	0	2	0	41	2
-	DF	(Turkey) Güngör Tekin	29	0	9	1	2	1	40	2
-	DF	(Turkey) Cüneyt Tanman	30	1	8	2	1	0	39	3
-	DF	(Turkey) Erdoğan Arıca	26	0	7	0	2	0	35	0
-	DF	(Turkey) Müfit Erkasap	22	2	5	0	2	0	29	2
-	DF	(Turkey) İbrahim Sokullu	14	0	4	3	1	0	19	3
-	DF	(Turkey) Rıdvan Kılıç	6	0	3	0	0	0	9	0
-	DF	(Turkey) Eyüp Taş	6	0	2	0	0	0	8	0
-	MF	(Turkey) Orhan Akyüz	23	3	6	2	2	0	31	5
-	MF	(Turkey) Gürcan Aday	23	3	6	0	2	0	31	3
-	MF	(Turkey) Metin Yıldız	22	0	7	1	2	0	31	1
-	MF	(Turkey) Turgay İnal	14	3	5	2	0	0	19	5
-	MF	(Turkey) Hasan Moralı	9	0	4	0	0	0	13	0
-	FW	(Turkey) Gökmen Özdenak	23	7	6	1	2	0	31	8
-	FW	(Turkey) Öner Kılıç	21	3	4	2	0	0	25	5
-	FW	(Turkey) Kemal Yıldırım	19	3	4	0	2	0	25	3
-	FW	(Turkey) Mustafa Dil	9	0	3	0	2	0	14	0
-	FW	(Turkey) Oğuz Aydoğdu	10	0	4	1	0	0	14	1
-	FW	(Turkey) Metin Çekiçler	6	1	6	1	0	0	12	2

=== Players in / out ===
==== In ====
Pos.	Nat.	Name	Age	Moving from
FW	(Turkey)	Kemal Yıldırım	21	Orduspor
MF	(Turkey)	Orhan Akyüz	25	Trabzonspor
DF	(Turkey)	İbrahim Sokullu	34	Edirnespor
GK	(Turkey)	Mustafa Cevlan	19	Tarsus Idman Yurdu SK
GK	(Turkey)	Haydar Erdoğan	20	Sarıyer G.K.
FW	(Turkey)	Oğuz Aydoğdu	19	Sarıyer G.K.
FW	(Turkey)	Metin Çekiçler	18	Galatasaray A2
DF	(Turkey)	Eyüp Taş	20	Galatasaray A2

==== Out ====
Pos.	Nat.	Name	Age	Moving to
MF	(Turkey)	Mehmet Oğuz	30	Fenerbahçe SK
MF	(Turkey)	Bahattin Demircan	23	Çaykur Rizespor

== 1. Lig ==
=== Standings ===
Pos	Team	Pld	W	D	L	GF	GA	GD	Pts
7	Orduspor	30	8	14	8	26	32	−6	30
8	Adana Demirspor	30	10	9	11	26	23	+3	29
9	Galatasaray	30	8	13	9	28	26	+2	29
10	Adanaspor	30	9	11	10	21	21	0	29
11	Beşiktaş	30	8	13	9	25	27	−2	29

Rules for classification: 1) points; 2) goal difference; 3) number of goals scored.

=== Matches ===
Kick-off listed in local time (EET)

26 August 1979 1	Göztepe	3–1	Galatasaray	İzmir
16:30 EET	Ertürk 31' (yellow card) 89'; Doğan Küçükduru 63'; Kadir Özateşler 77'		Özdenak 83'	Stadium: İzmir Atatürk Stadium; Referee: Ünal Şahin

2 September 1979 2	Galatasaray	1–1	Zonguldakspor	Istanbul
16:30 EET	Akyüz 11'		Kaner (yellow card) 51'; Terim 62'(o.g.); Kabin (yellow card) 81'	Stadium: Inönü Stadi; Referee: Sadık Deda

9 September 1979 3	Trabzonspor	2–0	Galatasaray	Trabzon
15:45 EET	Bali 51' 81'		Kılıç (yellow card) 67'; Tekin (yellow card) 79'	Stadium: Hüseyin Avni Aker Stadium; Referee: İhsan Türe

16 September 1979 4	Beşiktaş	2–0	Galatasaray	Istanbul
16:30 EET	Çoban 51'; Ergün 81'		Arıca (yellow card) 34'; Akyüz (yellow card) 70'; Tekin (yellow card) 73'; Terim (yellow card) 83'	Stadium: Inönü Stadi; Attendance: 39,998; Referee: Hilmi Ok

22 September 1979 5	Galatasaray	0–0	Gaziantepspor	Istanbul
16:00 EET				Stadium: Inönü Stadi; Attendance: 28,057; Referee: Yavuz Tunç

30 September 1979 6	Diyarbakırspor	1–1	Galatasaray	Diyarbakır
16:30 EET	Erül 26'		Özdenak 6'	Stadium: Diyarbakır Atatürk Stadium; Referee: İhsan Türe

7 October 1979 7	Galatasaray	1–0	Adana Demirspor	Istanbul
16:00 EET	Özdenak 28'; Tekin (yellow card) 79'		Çelik (yellow card) 43'	Stadium: Inönü Stadi; Attendance: 23,014; Referee: Yavuz Tunç

13 October 1979 8	Eskişehirspor	1–1	Galatasaray	Eskişehir
15:15 EET	Dinçer 11'		Kılıç 30'	Stadium: Eskişehir Atatürk Stadium; Referee: Nihat Güner

3 November 1979 9	Galatasaray	0–0	Altay	Istanbul
15:00 EET			Urgancı (yellow card) 44'; Şerif (yellow card) 64'	Stadium: Inönü Stadi; Attendance: 26,603; Referee: Talat Tokat

11 November 1979 10	Kayserispor	1–1	Galatasaray	Kayseri
14:30 EET	Yavman 34'(pen.)		Terim (yellow card) 57'; Özdenak 76'	Stadium: Kayseri Atatürk Stadium; Referee: İhsan Türe

25 November 1979 11	Fenerbahçe	1–1	Galatasaray	Istanbul
15:00 EET	Güneysu 10'; Çetiner (yellow card) 62'		Terim 63'(pen.)	Stadium: Inönü Stadi; Attendance: 40,000; Referee: Cumhur Demir

2 December 1979 12	Bursaspor	0–0	Galatasaray	Bursa
14:30 EET			Kılıç 32'; Arıca (yellow card) 38'	Stadium: Bursa Atatürk Stadium; Referee: Müşfik Talas

8 December 1979 13	Galatasaray SK	3–0	Orduspor	Istanbul
14:00 EET	Akyüz 30'; Erkasap (yellow card) 43'; Kılıç 54'Yıldırım 71'		Türközer (yellow card) 43'	Stadium: Inönü Stadi; Referee: İlyas Ayan

30 December 1979 14	Çaykur Rizespor	1–0	Galatasaray	Rize
13:45 EET	Dinçer 17'			Stadium: Rize Atatürk Stadium; Referee: Talat Tokat

6 January 1980 15	Galatasaray	1–2	Adanaspor	Istanbul
14:30 EET	Tekin (yellow card) 8'; Akyüz 32'		Kahraman 24'; Açıkel 37'; Gençalp (yellow card) 78'	Stadium: Inönü Stadi; Attendance: 21,681; Referee: İbrahim Acar

10 February 1980 16	Galatasaray	1–1	Göztepe	Istanbul
15:00 EET	Erkasap (yellow card) 61'; Aday 74'; Tanman (yellow card) 79'		Türken (yellow card) 27'; Küçükduru (red card) 32'; Sütçü (yellow card) 66'; Topuzoğlu 72'	Stadium: Inönü Stadi; Referee: Nihat Özbirgül

17 February 1980 17	Zonguldakspor	1–1	Galatasaray	Zonguldak
14:30 EET	Kayhan 14'(pen.); Sandalcı (yellow card) 28'; Yayın (yellow card) 84' (yellow-red card) 88'		Kılıç 42'	Stadium: Kemal Köksal Stadium; Referee: Sadık Deda

24 February 1980 18	Galatasaray	1–0	Trabzonspor	Istanbul
15:00 EET	Yıldız (yellow card) 43'; Tanman 82'		Akçay (red card) 1'; Bali (yellow card) 70'	Stadium: Inönü Stadi; Referee: Yılmaz Önen

2 March 1980 19	Galatasaray	1–2	Beşiktaş	Istanbul
15:15 EET	Aday 31'		Kılıç (yellow card) 39'; Gülen 65'; Batmaz (yellow card) 70'; Ergün 79'	Stadium: Inönü Stadi; Attendance: 40,032; Referee: Hilmi Ok

9 March 1980 20	Gaziantepspor	0–0	Galatasaray	Gaziantep
15:00 EET				Stadium: Kemal Ocak Stadium; Referee: İhsan Türe

15 March 1980 21	Galatasaray	1–0	Diyarbakırspor	Istanbul
15:15 EET	İnal 10'		Gezer (yellow card) 57'; Erül (yellow card) 82'	Stadium: Inönü Stadi; Attendance: 22,225; Referee: Yılmaz Dinçel

23 March 1980 22	Adana Demirspor	1–0	Galatasaray	Adana
14:45 EET	Gürcan 22'			Stadium: Adana 5 Ocak Stadium; Referee: İbrahim Acar

29 March 1980 23	Galatasaray	2–1	Eskişehirspor	Istanbul
15:15 EET	Aday 63'; Erkasap 65'; Tekin (yellow card) 80'		Şengül 19'; Şenoğlu (yellow card) 54'; Gürsel (yellow card) 68'	Stadium: Inönü Stadi; Attendance: 29,384; Referee: Talat Tokat

6 April 1980 24	Altay	3–1	Galatasaray	Izmir
15:30 EET	Denizli 10' 34'(pen.); İncirmen 60'		Terim 25' (pen.)	Stadium: İzmir Alsancak Stadium; Referee: Yılmaz Önen

13 April 1980 25	Galatasaray	2–0	Kayserispor	Istanbul
15:30 EET	Erkasap 22'; Aday (yellow card) 27'; Özdenak 46'		Çeçen (yellow card) 54'; Ürekli (yellow card) 78'	Stadium: Inönü Stadi; Attendance: 32,952; Referee: Nihat Özbirgül

27 April 1980 26	Adanaspor	1–0	Galatasaray	Adana
16:00 EET	Karasu 65'			Stadium: Adana 5 Ocak Stadium; Referee: Talat Tokat

4 May 1980 27	Galatasaray	0–0	Fenerbahçe	Istanbul
16:00 EET				Stadium: Inönü Stadi; Attendance: 39,765; Referee: Cumhur Demir

10 May 1980 28	Galatasaray	3–0	Bursaspor	Istanbul
15:30 EET	Yıldırım 2'; İnal 42'; Özdenak 82'			Stadium: Inönü Stadi; Attendance: 23,459; Referee: Yılmaz Önen

19 May 1980 29	Orduspor	1–1	Galatasaray	Ordu
16:00 EET	Çorlu 48'		Yıldırım 40'	Stadium: Ordu 19 Eylül Stadium; Referee: Nihat Özbirgül

25 May 1980 30	Galatasaray	3–0	Çaykur Rizespor	Istanbul
16:00 EET	Çekiçler 8'; İnal 19'; Özdenak 53'; Terim 64'		Gürbüz (yellow card) 44'	Stadium: Inönü Stadi; Attendance: 28,730; Referee: Yılmaz Dinçel

== Turkiye Kupasi ==
=== 5th stage ===
14 November 1979 1	Bursaspor	1–0	Galatasaray	Bursa
				Stadium: Bursa Atatürk Stadium

5 December 1979 2	Galatasaray	2–0	Bursaspor	İstanbul
	Sokullu 69'; Kılıç 89'			Stadium: Inönü Stadi

=== 6th stage ===
27 January 1980 1	Düzcespor	0–3	Galatasaray	Istanbul
			Sokullu 2'; Tekin 30'; Akyüz 87'

3 February 1980 2	Galatasaray	3–2	Düzcespor	İstanbul
	Sokullu; Tanman; Yıldız			Stadium: Inönü Stadi; Attendance: 11,707

=== Quarter-final ===
5 March 1980 1	Galatasaray	1–1	Gaziantepspor	Istanbul
15:15 EET	Özdenak 58'			Stadium: Inönü Stadi; Attendance: 9,708

19 March 1980 2	Gaziantepspor	1–2 (a.e.t.)	Galatasaray	Gaziantep
14:45 EET			Aydoğdu 6'; Tanman 111'	Stadium: Kamil Ocak Stadium

=== Semi-final ===
9 April 1980 1	Adana Demirspor	2–3	Galatasaray	Adana
15:00 EET			Çekiçler 9'; İnal 23', 51'	Stadium: Adana 5 Ocak Stadium

23 April 1980 2	Galatasaray	1–2	Adana Demirspor	Istanbul
16:30 EET	Akyüz (pen.)			Stadium: Inönü Stadi

=== Final ===
14 May 1980 1	Altay SK	1–0	Galatasaray SK	Altay
18:00 EET	Kayıhan 47'			Stadium: Alsancak Stadium; Referee: İlyas Ayan

28 May 1980 2	Galatasaray	1–1	Altay	Istanbul
16:00 EET	Kılıç 10'		Denizli 63'(pen.)	Stadium: Inönü Stadi; Attendance: 30,650; Referee: Nihat Özbirgül

== UEFA Cup ==
=== First round ===
19 September 1979 1	Galatasaray	0–0	Crvena Zvezda	Istanbul
				Stadium: Inönü Stadi; Attendance: 10,574; Referee: (Austria) Franz Wöhrer

3 October 1979 2	Crvena Zvezda	3–1	Galatasaray	Belgrade
	Savic 20' 71'; Milovanovic 76'		Tekin 75'	Stadium: Stadion FK Crvena Zvezda; Referee: (Belgium) Marcel Van Langenhove

== Friendly Matches ==
Kick-off listed in local time (EET)

=== TSYD Kupası ===
15 August 1979 1	Galatasaray SK	2–1	Beşiktaş JK	Istanbul
20:00 EET	Öner Kılıç 32'; İbrahim Sokullu 66'	(Report)	Necdet Ergün 8'	Stadium: İnönü Stadı; Attendance: 40,050; Referee: Emin Tuncalı

17 August 1979 2	Fenerbahçe SK	1–0	Galatasaray SK	Istanbul
20:00 EET	Raşit Çetiner 71'	(Report)		Stadium: İnönü Stadı; Attendance: 40,459; Referee: Cumhur Demir

== Attendance ==
Competition	Av. Att.	Total Att.
1. Lig	28,718	315,902
Türkiye Kupası	17,355	52,065
UEFA Cup	10,574	10,574
Total	25,236	378,541
