= Özdenak =

Özdenak is a Turkish surname. Notable people with the surname include:

- Doğan Özdenak (born 1954), Turkish footballer
- Gökmen Özdenak (1947–2025), Turkish footballer
- Yasin Özdenak (born 1948), Turkish footballer and coach
