= Atatürk Stadium =

Atatürk Stadium can refer to:

- Antalya Atatürk Stadium, an old football stadium in Antalya, Turkey
- Atatürk Olympic Stadium, a football stadium in İstanbul, Turkey
- Balıkesir Atatürk Stadium, a football stadium in Balıkesir, Turkey
- Bolu Atatürk Stadium, a football stadium in Bolu, Turkey
- Bursa Atatürk Stadium, an old football stadium in Bursa, Turkey
- Denizli Atatürk Stadium, a football stadium in Denizli, Turkey
- Diyarbakır Atatürk Stadium, an old football stadium in Diyarbakır, Turkey
- Elazığ Atatürk Stadium, a football stadium in Elazığ, Turkey
- Eskişehir Atatürk Stadium, an old football stadium in Eskişehir, Turkey
- İzmir Atatürk Stadium, a football stadium in İzmir, Turkey
- Kayseri Atatürk Stadium, a former football stadium in Kayseri, Turkey
- Konya Atatürk Stadium, an old football stadium in Konya, Turkey
- Lefkoşa Atatürk Stadı, a football stadium in Lefkoşa, Turkish Republic of Northern Cyprus
- Rize Atatürk Stadium, an old football stadium in Rize, Turkey
- Sakarya Atatürk Stadium, an old football stadium in Adapazarı, Turkey
