= Ešref Jašarević =

Bosnian footballer

Personal information
- Full name: Ešref Jašarević
- Date of birth: 5 February 1951 (age 75)
- Place of birth: Gradačac, SFR Yugoslavia
- Position: Midfielder

Senior career*
| Years | Team | Apps | (Gls) |
| –1972 | Zvijezda Gradačac | | |
| 1972–1978 | Sloboda Tuzla | 172 | (13) |
| 1979 | Galatasaray | 23 | (9) |
| 1979–1982 | Napredak Kruševac | 29 | (2) |

International career
| 1977 | Yugoslavia | 2 | (0) |
- * Club domestic league appearances and goals

Ešref Jašarević (born 5 February 1951) is a Bosnian retired footballer.

== Club career ==
Born in Gradačac, SR Bosnia-Herzegovina, FPR Yugoslavia, he started playing with local side NK Zvijezda Gradačac, but he would become famous while playing in the Yugoslav First League club FK Sloboda Tuzla where he played a total of 172 first league matches, and scored 13 goals. In 1979, he spent half a season in Turkey with Galatasaray SK, before returning to Yugoslav First League, this time, to FK Napredak Kruševac where he played until 1982.

== International career ==
In 1977, he played two matches for the Yugoslavia national football team. His debut was on 30 January, in Bogota, against Colombia (a 1–0 win), and the other match was played on 1 February, in León, against Mexico (a 5–1 win).

After retiring, he became a sports director of NK Zvijezda Gradačac.

== External sources ==
- Ešref Jašarević at Reprezentacija.rs (in Serbian)
- Ešref Jašarević at National-Football-Teams.com
