= Kemal Yıldırım =

Turkish footballer and manager

Personal information
- Date of birth: May 15, 1958 (age 68)
- Place of birth: Ordu, Turkey
- Position: Midfielder

Youth career
- Orduspor

Senior career*
Years	Team	Apps	(Gls)
1976–1979	Orduspor	53	(19)
1976–1979	Galatasaray	19	(3)
1980–1981	Zonguldakspor	22	(4)
1981–1983	Adana Demirspor	66	(6)
1983–1987	Ankaragücü	134	(22)
1987–1989	Sakaryaspor	66	(7)
1989–1991	Gençlerbirliği	56	(21)
1991–1996	Zeytinburnuspor	93	(25)
1992–1993	→ Bakırköyspor (loan)	14	(1)
1995–1996	→ Gebzespor (loan)	11	(5)

Managerial career
- 1998: Altay (assistant)
- 1999: Bursaspor (assistant)
- 1999–2000: Adanaspor (assistant)
- 2000–2001: Adanaspor
- 2003: Adanaspor (assistant)
- 2007: Yıldırımspor
- 2009: Yıldırımspor
- * Club domestic league appearances and goals

Kemal Yıldırım (born 15 May 1958) is a Turkish former professional footballer and former manager of Adanaspor and amateur team Yıldırımspor. He is one of the most capped players in Süper Lig history.
