= Serdar Bali =

Turkish footballer

Personal information
- Full name: Serdar Bali
- Date of birth: 21 July 1956 (age 70)
- Place of birth: Istanbul, Turkey
- Height: 1.68 m (5 ft 6 in)
- Position: Midfielder

Youth career
- 1972-1975: Akçaabat Sebatspor

Senior career*
Years	Team	Apps	(Gls)
1975-1980	Trabzonspor	101	(13)
1980-1985	Beşiktaş	51	(6)
1983-1984	→Karagümrük (loan)	18	(1)
1985-1988	Trabzonspor	54	(1)
1985-1986	→Denizlispor (loan)	22	(0)

International career
1977–1978	Turkey U21	9	(4)
1978–1980	Turkey	8	(0)
- * Club domestic league appearances and goals

Serdar Bali (born 21 July 1956) is a Turkish former professional footballer best known for his years with Trabzonspor and Beşiktaş.

== Professional career ==
Bali was born in Istanbul where his father Zekeriya Bali was playing as a footballer. The family moved to his father's native Trabzon, where Bali started playing football professionally with Trabzonspor. In 5 seasons with them, he won 4 Süper Lig titles. In 1980, he transferred to Beşiktaş where he won his fifth Süper Lig league title in 1982. He returned to Trabzonspor in 1985, where he retired in 1988.

After retiring as a footballer, Bali worked in commerce -from 1996 to 2002 with his old club Trabzonspor in management. Since 2007, he has been a sports writer.

== Honours ==
Trabzonspor

- Süper Lig: 1975-76, 1976-77, 1978-79, 1979-1980
- Turkish Cup: 1976-77, 1977-78
- Turkish Super Cup: 1975-76, 1976-77, 1978-79, 1979-1980
- Prime Minister's Cup: 1977-78

Beşiktaş

- Süper Lig: 1981-82
