= İlkadım Athletics Stadium =

Track and field facility in İlkadım, Samsun, Turkey

- İlkadım Atletizm Stadyumu
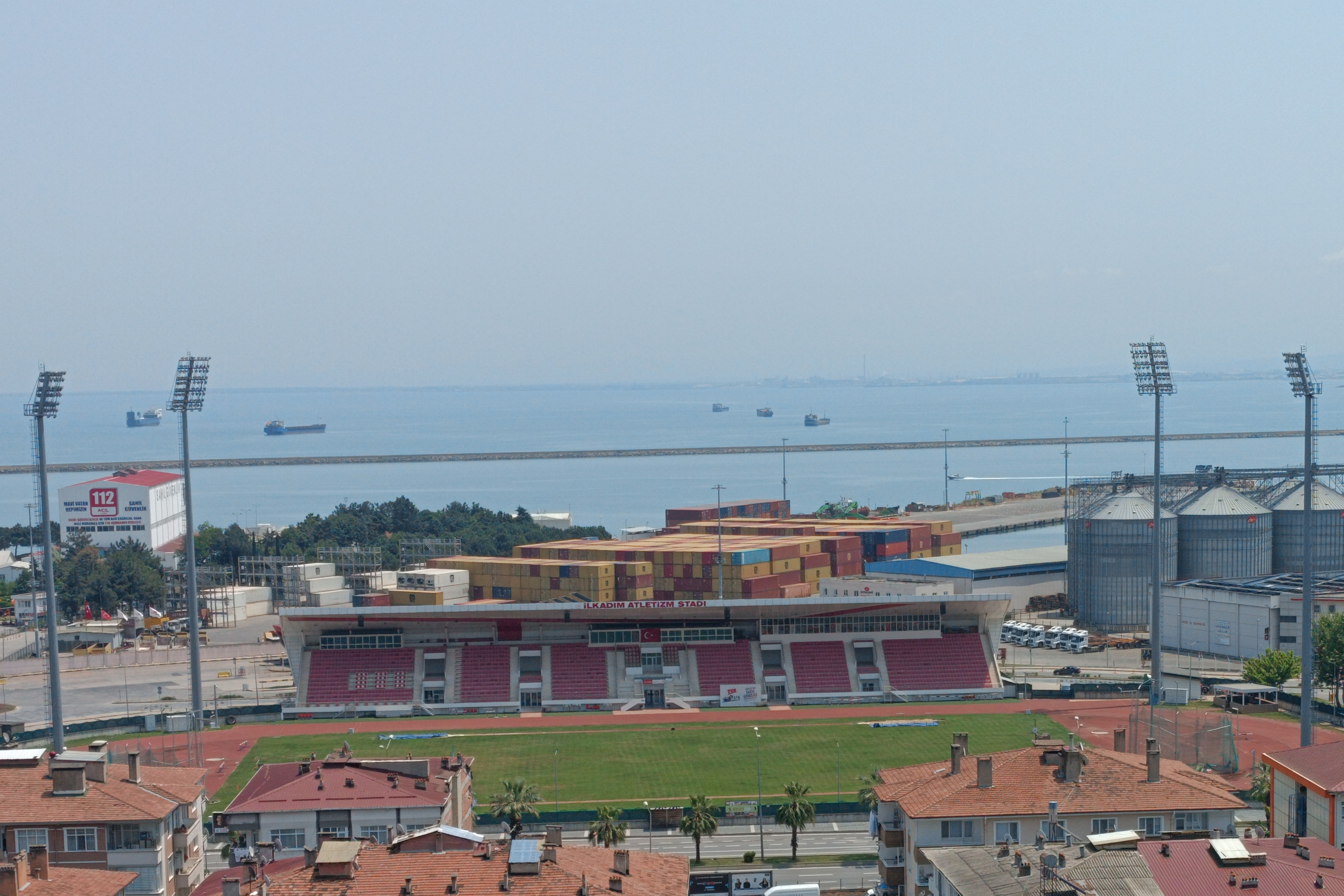
- Interactive map of İlkadım Athletics Stadium
- Location: İlkadım, Samsun, Turkey
- Coordinates: 41°18′31″N 36°20′08″E
- Capacity: 2,000

Construction
- Opened: 1958; 68 years ago
- Rebuilt: 2017; 9 years ago
- Cost: around ₺ 20 million (approx. US$ 8.5 million) (rebuild)

Tenants
- Samsunspor (1965–1975): Events hosted; 2017 Summer Deaflympics

İlkadım Athletics Stadium (Turkish: İlkadım Atletizm Stadyumu) is a track and field facility located in İlkadım district of Samsun Province, northern Turkey. It was renovated for the 2017 Summer Deaflympics.

The stadium is situated at Liman Mah., Atatürk Boulevard 93 in İlkadım. The athletics stadium was built in place of a former 1,500-seat football stadium, which was built in 1958. The old stadium was renovated and brought to IAAF standards by adding a synthetic-surface track in 2001. The area for athletics events totaled to 6,500 m^{2} (70,000 sq ft). With the modernization and expansion of Samsun 19 Mayıs Stadium, the old stadium was converted into an athletics-only stadium in April 2010 that caused public backlash. By November 2014, the old stadium, which did not meet the requirements any more, was demolished to make place for a modern athletics stadium. The projected cost of the construction was around ₺ 20 million (approx. US$8.5 million). The stadium was built for the 2017 Summer Deaflympics. The venue has a seating capacity for 2,000 spectators, including 100 for VIP, 200 for media members, 200 for accredited sportspeople and 100 for physically handicapped people.

== International events hosted ==
The venue hosted athletics events of the 2017 Summer Deaflympics.
