= Mehmet Akpınar =

Turkish fencer (born 1940)

Personal information
- Born: 3 March 1940 (age 86)

Sport
- Sport: Fencing

Mehmet Akpınar (born 3 March 1940) is a Turkish fencer. He competed in the individual sabre event at the 1972 Summer Olympics.
