= Giresun Atatürk Stadium =

Football stadium in Giresun, Turkey

Coordinates: 40.9097°N 38.3719°E

Giresun Stadium
- Ataturk
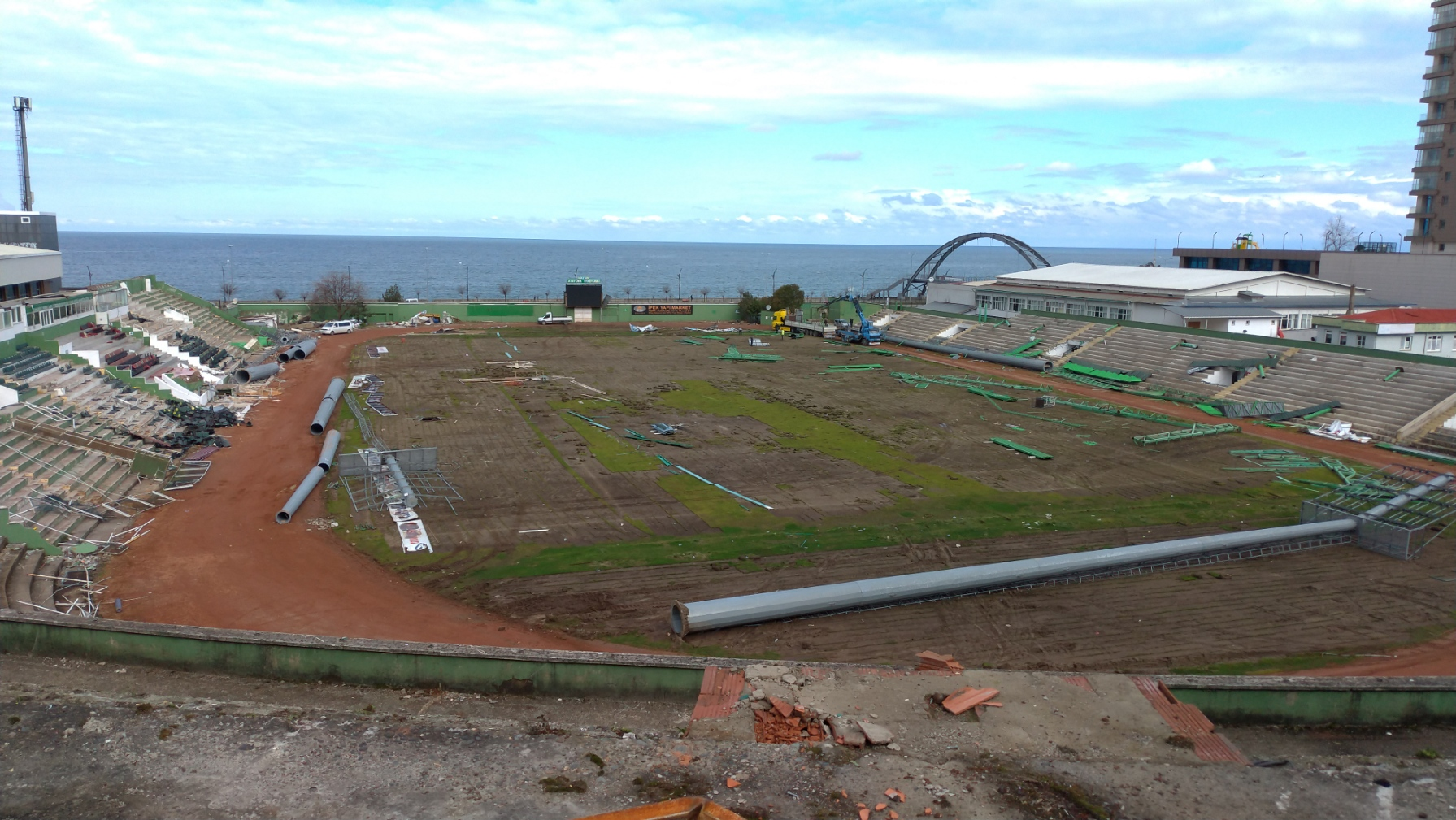
- Giresun Atatürk Stadium
- Interactive map of Giresun Stadium
- Location: Giresun, Turkey
- Capacity: 12,191
- Surface: Turf

Construction
- Opened: 1941
- Renovated: ?
- Closed: 2021
- Demolished: 2022

Tenant
- Giresunspor

Giresun Atatürk Stadium was a multi-purpose stadium in Giresun, Turkey. It was used mostly for football matches and is the former home ground of TFF First League team Giresunspor.

The stadium was built in 1941 and holds 12191 people.
