= Doğan Özdenak =

Turkish footballer

Personal information
- Full name: Doğan Özdenak
- Date of birth: May 10, 1954 (age 72)
- Place of birth: Istanbul, Turkey
- Position: Goalkeeper

Senior career*
Years	Team	Apps	(Gls)
1973–1974	İskenderunspor	7	(0)
1976–1977	Galatasaray	1	(0)
- * Club domestic league appearances and goals as of 3 April 2018 ‡ National team caps and goals as of 3 April 2018

Doğan Özdenak (born 10 May 1954) is a Turkish former footballer who played as a goalkeeper.

== Professional career ==
Özdenak made one appearance for Galatasaray in the Turkish Süper Lig, in a 3-2 win over Adanaspor on 8 May 1977. He was transferred to Galatasaray in 1977, as the third goalkeeper.

== Personal life ==
Özdenak was born into a sporting family, as his brothers Yasin and Gökmen were also professional footballers.
