= Müjdat Karanfilci =

Turkish footballer (born 1950)

Personal information
- Date of birth: 28 February 1950 (age 76)
- Place of birth: Gelibolu, Turkey
- Position: Forward

Senior career*
| Years | Team | Apps | (Gls) |
| 1971–1972 | İstanbulspor | 29 | (3) |
| 1975–1976 | Giresunspor | 26 | (13) |
| 1976–1978 | Mersin İY | 55 | (17) |
| 1978–1984 | Adana Demirspor | 152 | (45) |
| Total | | 262 | (78) |

International career
| 1977 | Turkey | 2 | (0) |

Managerial career
- 1991–1992: Sökespor
- 1992–1993: Manisaspor
- 1993–1994: Sökespor
- 1994–1995: Edremit Belediyespor
- 1995–1996: Afyonspor
- 1997: Lüleburgazspor
- 1997–1998: Torbalispor
- 1998–1999: Lüleburgazspor
- 2001: Geliboluspor
- 2006: Adana Demirspor
- * Club domestic league appearances and goals

Müjdat Karanfilci (born 28 February 1950) is a former football player and manager. A forward, he played for clubs in Turkey and made two appearances for the Turkey national team.

== Career ==
Born in Gelibolu, Karanfilci started playing senior football for local side İstanbulspor A.Ş. He had spells with Giresunspor and Mersin İdmanyurdu SK, before joining Adana Demirspor. He spent six seasons with Adana Demirspor making 152 Süper Lig appearances and scoring 45 goals for the club.

Karanfilci made two appearances for the Turkey national team in 1977.

After he retired from playing football, Karanfilci became a manager for several lower-level Turkish clubs. He was appointed manager of Adana Demirspor in 2006.
