= Erdoğan Arıca =

Turkish football manager

Personal information
- Full name: Erdoğan Arıca
- Date of birth: 24 July 1954
- Place of birth: Fatsa, Ordu, Turkey
- Date of death: 10 April 2012 (aged 57)
- Place of death: Istanbul, Turkey
- Position: Defender

Senior career*
Years	Team	Apps	(Gls)
1971–1974	Malatyaspor		
1974–1977	Orduspor		
1977–1981	Galatasaray S.K.		
1981–1986	Fenerbahçe S.K.		
1986–1987	Diyarbakırspor		
1987–1988	Sarıyer		

International career
1977–1986	Turkey	30	(0)

Managerial career
- 1996–1998: Çanakkale Dardanelspor
- 1998–1999: Göztepe
- 1999–2000: Samsunspor
- 2000: Gaziantepspor
- 2001: Malatyaspor
- 2001–2002: Gençlerbirliği
- 2003: Bursaspor
- 2003–2004: Samsunspor
- 2004: Gençlerbirliği
- 2005: Çaykur Rizespor
- 2005–2006: Samsunspor
- 2007: Gaziantepspor
- 2008: Çaykur Rizespor
- 2008–2009: Hacettepe S.K.
- 2010: Karşıyaka
- * Club domestic league appearances and goals

Erdoğan Arıca (24 July 1954 – 10 April 2012) was a UEFA Pro Licensed Turkish football manager and coach. As a footballer, he played defender. He was also the brother of the singer Soner Arıca and the nephew of Kadir İnanır.

== Career ==
Arıca played for Malatyaspor (1971–1974), Orduspor (1974–1977), Galatasaray S.K. (1977–1981), Fenerbahçe S.K. (1981–1986), Diyarbakırspor (on loan, 1986–1987) and Sarıyer G.K. (1987–1988) during his playing days. He made 30 appearances for the Turkey national football team from 1977 to 1986. He retired in 1988 and became a football manager and coach. He managed several teams including Çanakkale Dardanelspor, Gaziantepspor, Bursaspor Samsunspor, Çaykur Rizespor, Malatyaspor and Gençlerbirliği.
