= Hilmi Ok =

Turkish football referee (1932–2020)

- Born: 18 January 1932; Istanbul, Turkey
- Died: 15 February 2020 (aged 88)

Domestic
Years	League	Role
1974–1981	Süper Lig	Referee

International
Years	League	Role
1976–1981	FIFA listed	Referee

Hilmi Ok (18 January 1932 – 15 February 2020) was a Turkish football referee.

== Refereeing career ==
Ok was assigned to referee in the Süper Lig in 1974, before becoming a FIFA referee in 1976.

In 1980, Ok was assigned to referee at UEFA Euro 1980, where he officiated a group stage match between the Netherlands and Czechoslovakia.

Ok retired from officiating in 1981.

== Personal life ==
Ok died on 15 February 2020 at the age of 88.
