= Selahattin Beyazıt =

Turkish businessman (1931–2022)

President of Galatasaray SK
- In office 1969–1973
- In office 1975–1979

Personal details
- Born: 5 July 1931 Doğubayazıt, Ağrı, Turkey
- Died: 21 January 2022 (aged 90) Istanbul, Turkey
- Children: 1
- Education: Galatasaray High School; Cambridge University
- Profession: Businessman

Selahattin Beyazıt (1931–2022) was a Turkish businessman from Turkey. He is known for his role as president of the Turkish football club Galatasaray which he held two terms from 1969 to 1973 and from 1975 to 1979.

== Early life and education ==
He was born in Doğubayazıt, Ağrı, on 5 July 1931. His grandfather, Ibrahim Ağa, was the chief of a Kurd tribe who participated in the Kurdish rebellion in Ağrı in 1926. Ibrahim Ağa was forced to exile due to this incident. Beyazıt's father, Mehmet, settled in Istanbul where he had business activities.

Beyazıt graduated from Galatasaray High School in 1950. He had a degree from Cambridge University. During his studies at Cambridge, he became a member of a Mason Lodge and the Bilderberg Group through his close relationship with Lord Brabazon of Tara.

== Career and activities ==
During the Democrat Party government in the 1950s, Beyazıt briefly served as the private secretary of Prime Minister Adnan Menderes. Beyazıt was the representative of the British companies, Leyland Trucks and Shell. He later established his own company. He was the third highest tax payer in Turkey in 1976. He was appointed chairman of Türk Pirelli Company in 2004 succeeding Bülent Eczacıbaşı in the post.

Beyazıt became a regular member of the Bilderberg Meetings from 1971 to 1997. He was the representative of Turkey to the Bilderberg Group between 1972 and 1992. He was the organizer of the Group's meeting in Çeşme in 1975. He was succeeded by Suna Kıraç in the post.

=== Galatasaray presidency ===
Beyazıt was elected as the president of Galatasaray in 1969 and held the post until 1973. He was again elected to the post in 1975, and his term ended in 1979. During his presidency Galatasaray won three league cups with the British manager Brian Birch.

== Personal life and death ==
Beyazıt was married and had a son. He died in Istanbul on 21 January 2022.
