= Yasin Özdenak =

Turkish footballer (born 1948)

Personal information
- Full name: Erol Yasin Özdenak
- Date of birth: 11 October 1948 (age 78)
- Place of birth: Iskenderun, Turkey
- Height: 1.84 m (6 ft 1/2 in)
- Position: Goalkeeper

Senior career*
Years	Team	Apps	(Gls)
1965–1966	İstanbulspor	19	(0)
1967–1977	Galatasaray	186	(0)
1977–1979	New York Cosmos	41	(0)

International career
1971–1975	Turkey	6	(0)

Managerial career
- 1981–1982: New York Cosmos
- * Club domestic league appearances and goals

Yasin Özdenak (born 11 October 1948) is a former Turkish football goalkeeper and now an active coach. He is currently employed by Hume City FC as the Technical Director of the Club.

== Professional career ==
In 1977, Ahmet and Nesuhi Ertegun the transferred Yasin, known in the United States as Erol Yasin, when he was 28 to the Cosmos where he played alongside football legends like Pelé and Franz Beckenbauer. Pelé was 35 years old and played 2 years with Yasin Ozdenak for New York Cosmos before he gave up playing. Yasin also coached the Cosmos.

He was a goalkeeper and also, another legendary football player, Diego Armando Maradona had become opponent to Yasin Özdenak when Maradona was 18 years old at a friendly match.

He also managed Sydney Crescent Star, a team who at the time competed in the NSW Premier League in Australia. He led the team to a top 5 position in their first season as well as a victory in the Continental Cup (now known as the Tiger Turf Cup).

== Personal life ==
Özdenak was born into a sporting family, as his brothers Doğan, Mustafa and Gökmen were also professional footballers. He has 2 other siblings Figen and Tuncay.
