= Bülent Ünder =

Turkish footballer and manager

Personal information
- Date of birth: 16 April 1949 (age 77)
- Place of birth: Istanbul, Turkey
- Height: 1.75 m (5 ft 9 in)
- Position: Midfielder

Senior career*
Years	Team	Apps	(Gls)
1969–1978	Galatasaray	127	(6)

International career
1973–74	Turkey	9	(0)

Managerial career
- 1991–92: Çengelköyspor
- 1992–93: Denizlispor
- 1996–2000: Galatasaray (Assistant coach)
- 2000–01: Samsunspor
- 2005–06: Galatasaray (Assistant coach)
- 2011: Galatasaray
- * Club domestic league appearances and goals

Bülent Ünder (born 16 April 1949) is a Turkish former professional football player and manager.

== Playing career ==
Born Istanbul, Turkey, Ünder played his entire career for Galatasaray. He played eight seasons for his club. His team won the Turkish league championship for three times, and won the Turkish Cup twice during his playing career. He finished his career in 1978 with a farewell match against city rivals Fenerbahçe.

Ünder also played for the Turkey national team for nine games between 1973 and 1974.

== Coaching career ==
Bülent Ünder began his coaching career in the 1991–92 season at Çengelköyspor. After a season Ünder joined the second division side Denizlispor. However, his contract there was terminated after a short time. Three years later, Ünder returned to Galatasaray as the assistant coach of Fatih Terim. Alongside Terim, Bülent Ünder helped the team to win the league four times in a row, also winning the Turkish Cup twice and becoming the UEFA Cup winners in 2000.

After Terim left Galatasaray in the summer of 2000 for Fiorentina, Bülent Ünder also left Galatasaray and was appointed as the manager for Samsunspor in the 2000–01 season. In this season he managed to defeat his former team Galatasaray in their own home stadium, which was something very rare at that time.

Ünder returned Galatasaray in the 2005–06 season as a game analyst for Eric Gerets. On 25 March 2011, he was appointed as the manager for Galatasaray until the end of season after the contract of Gheorghe Hagi was mutually terminated by the team.
