= Galatasaray U21 =

- Full name: Galatasaray U21
- Nickname(s): Cimbom; Aslan (The Lion); Sarı Kırmızılılar (Yellow-Reds); Avrupa Fatihi (Conqueror of Europe); Gala (Mostly used outside of Turkey)
- Ground: Metin Oktay Training Center
- Capacity: 2,500
- Chairman: Dursun Özbek
- Manager: Ceyhun Müderrisoğlu
- League: U21 Ligi
- 2019–20: 1st
- Website: https://www.galatasaray.org/sl/futbol-akademisi-ana-sayfa/26
Home colours	Away colours	Third colours

Galatasaray S.K. U21, commonly known as Galatasaray S.K. B is a football club based in Istanbul, Turkey. It is the reserve team of Galatasaray and the club play in the U21 Ligi.

== History ==
They have been members of the Turkish Youth league formed in 1988 and Turkish PAF League formed in 1999. They play their home games at Metin Oktay Facilities in Florya, which is also the training ground of Galatasaray S.K. The team mainly consists of Under-21 players at the club, although senior players occasionally play in the reserve side, under special conditions.

The reserves head coach is Erkan Ültanır, who picks and manages the side. Galatasaray PAF won the Turkish PAF league titles in last three years.

== Honours ==
- U21 Ligi
  - Winners (7): (record) 1989–90, 1993–94, 2004–05, 2005–06, 2006–07, 2010–11, 2014–15
  - Runners-up (2): 1996–97, 2007–08

== Former managers ==
- (Turkey) Abdullah Avcı (2004–2005)
- (Turkey) Suat Kaya (2004–2006)
- (Turkey) Zafer Koç
- (Turkey) Erkan Ültanır
- (Turkey) Nedim Yiğit (2008–2010)
- (Turkey) Orhan Atik (2010–2016)
- (Turkey) Ceyhun Müderrisoğlu (2019–)

== Players ==
=== Current squad ===
Note: Flags indicate national team as defined under FIFA eligibility rules; some limited exceptions apply. Players may hold more than one non-FIFA nationality.

No.	Pos.	Nation	Player
--	GK	(Turkey) TUR	Berk Balaban
--	GK	(Turkey) TUR	Emircan Seçgin
--	GK	(Turkey) TUR	Evra Saner Gülal
--	DF	(Turkey) TUR	Arda Kaan Yıldız
--	DF	(Turkey) TUR	Emin Bayram
--	DF	(Turkey) TUR	Berk Akdemir
--	DF	(Turkey) TUR	Işık Kaan Arslan
--	DF	(Turkey) TUR	Ercan Şirin
--	DF	(Turkey) TUR	Süleyman Luş
--	DF	(Turkey) TUR	Mustafa Yiğit Turgut
--	MF	(Turkey) TUR	Güney Gençel

No.	Pos.	Nation	Player
--	MF	(Turkey) TUR	Berkan Mahmut Keskin
--	MF	(Turkey) TUR	Göktan Işılak
--	MF	(Turkey) TUR	Atalay Yıldırım
--	MF	(Turkey) TUR	Atalay Babacan
--	MF	(Turkey) TUR	Mustafa Fettahoğlu
--	MF	(Turkey) TUR	Erkan Süer
--	MF	(Turkey) TUR	Abdussamed Karnuçu
--	MF	(Turkey) TUR	Mirza Cihan
--	FW	(Turkey) TUR	Erencan Yardımcı
--	FW	(Turkey) TUR	Deniz Pala
--	FW	(Turkey) TUR	Bozan Uymaz
--	FW	(Turkey) TUR	Yunus Akgün

== Coaching staff ==
Position	Name
Football Academy Coordinator	(Turkey) Ali Yavaş
Football Academy Administrative Manager	(Turkey) Semih Egemen Ersoy
Academy Coach Coordinator - Technical Manager U19	(Turkey) Ceyhun Müderrisoğlu
