= Nihat Akbay =

Turkish footballer (1945–2020)

Personal information
- Date of birth: 1 January 1945
- Place of birth: Beykoz, Istanbul, Turkey
- Date of death: 24 March 2020 (aged 75)
- Position: Goalkeeper

Senior career*
Years	Team	Apps	(Gls)
1961–1968	Beykoz	155	(1)
1968–1978	Galatasaray	115	(0)
Total		270	(1)

International career
1964–1976	Turkey	7	(0)
- * Club domestic league appearances and goals

Nihat Akbay (1 January 1945 – 24 March 2020) was a Turkish footballer who played as a goalkeeper.

== Career ==
Born in Beykoz, Istanbul, Akbay played club football for Beykoz and Galatasaray.

He also earned 7 caps for the Turkey national team between 1964 and 1976.

== Later life and death ==
Akbay died on 24 March 2020.
