= Bolu Atatürk Stadium =

Multi-purpose stadium in Turkey

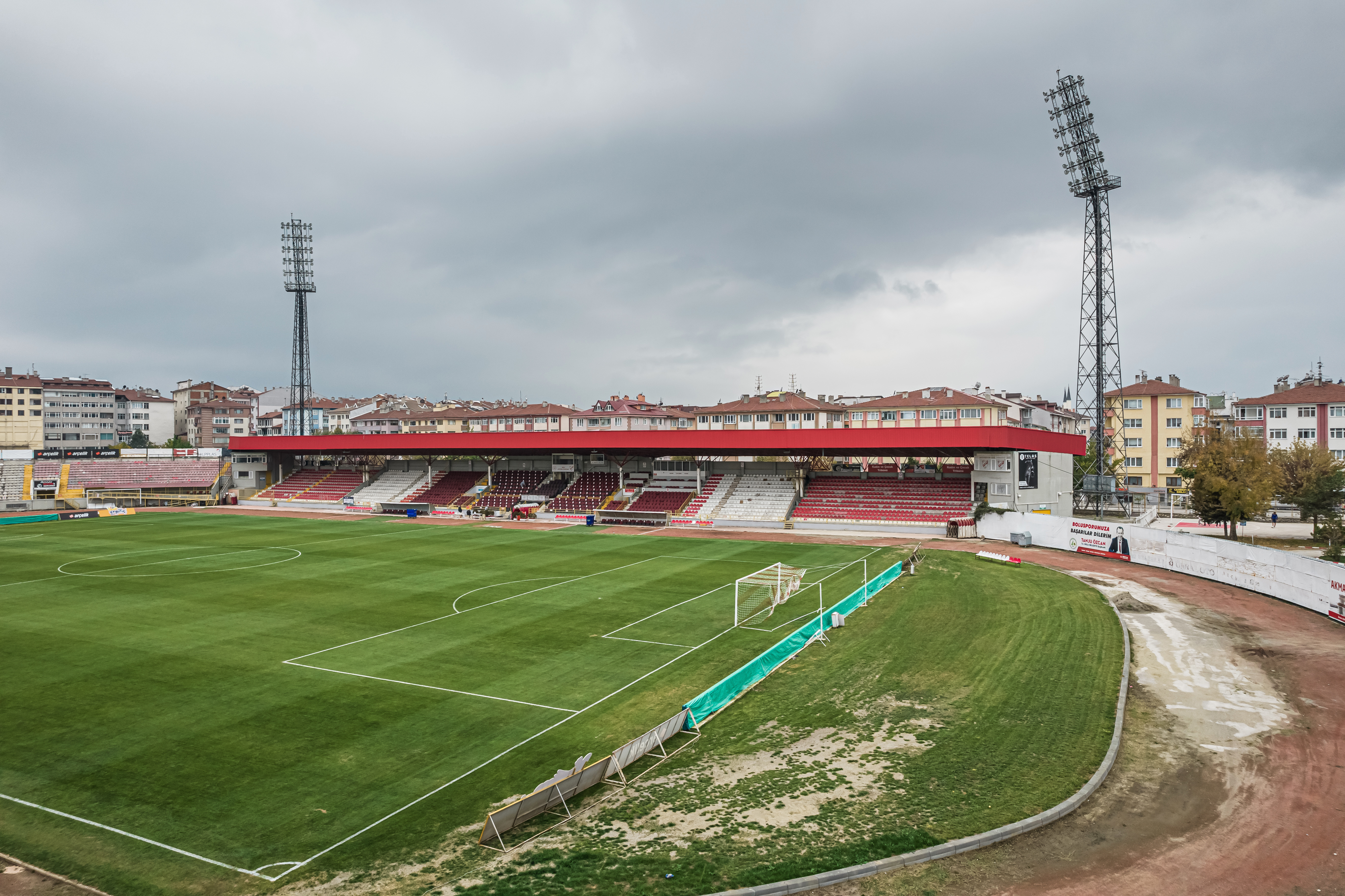
- Interactive map of Bolu Atatürk Stadium
- Location: Bolu, Turkey
- Coordinates: 40°44′10.7″N 31°36′24.3″E
- Operator: Boluspor
- Capacity: 8,456
- Surface: Natural grass 105m x 68m

Construction
- Groundbreaking: 1956
- Opened: 1958

Tenant
- Boluspor

Bolu Atatürk Stadium (Turkish: Bolu Atatürk Stadyumu) is a multi-purpose stadium that is located in Bolu, Turkey. It is currently used mostly for football matches and is the home ground of Boluspor. The stadium has a capacity of 8,456 people and was built in 1958.
