= Mehmet Oğuz =

Turkish football player (1949–2022)

Personal information
- Date of birth: 3 May 1949
- Place of birth: Istanbul, Turkey
- Date of death: 27 November 2022 (aged 73)
- Height: 1.75 m (5 ft 9 in)
- Position: Midfielder

Youth career
- Kadirga SK

Senior career*
Years	Team	Apps	(Gls)
- Galatasaray
- Fenerbahçe

International career
	Turkey U21	6	
	Turkey	19	(3)
- * Club domestic league appearances and goals

Mehmet Oğuz (3 May 1949 – 27 November 2022), popularly known as Big Mehmet, was a Turkish footballer who played for the Turkey national team, as well as Galatasaray and Fenerbahçe.

== Club career ==
Mehmet Oğuz was born in Istanbul on 3 May 1949. He started his footballing career with Kadirga SK. He later joined the Galatasaray junior team and was promoted to the senior squad where he became part of the starting eleven. He was nicknamed Big Mehmet in order to differentiate him from his teammate Mehmet Özgül. Oğuz won three championships in a row with Galatasaray and he became the club's captain in the 1970s.

At Galatasaray, Oğuz was part of the team that won the 1968–69 1.Lig, 1971–72 1.Lig and 1972–73 1.Lig Turkish League. He also won the 1972–73, 1968–69 and 1975–76 Turkish Cups with the same club.

In the 1979–80 season, Galatasaray did not extend his contract and he moved to Fenerbahçe with the help of Cemil Turan. He was with the club for a season and retired on 30 November 1980 with a match between Fenerbahçe and Beşiktaş.

== International career ==
Mehmet Oğuz played six times for the Turkey U21 national team and 19 times for the Turkey senior national team. He scored three goals in 25 caps.

== Death ==
Oğuz died of heart related problems on 27 November 2022, at the age of 73. His funeral prayer was conducted at Ataköy 5th Section Mosque before he was buried.
