= Eskişehir Atatürk Stadium =

Stadium in Eskişehir, Turkey

Coordinates: 39°46′14.70″N 30°30′49.80″E

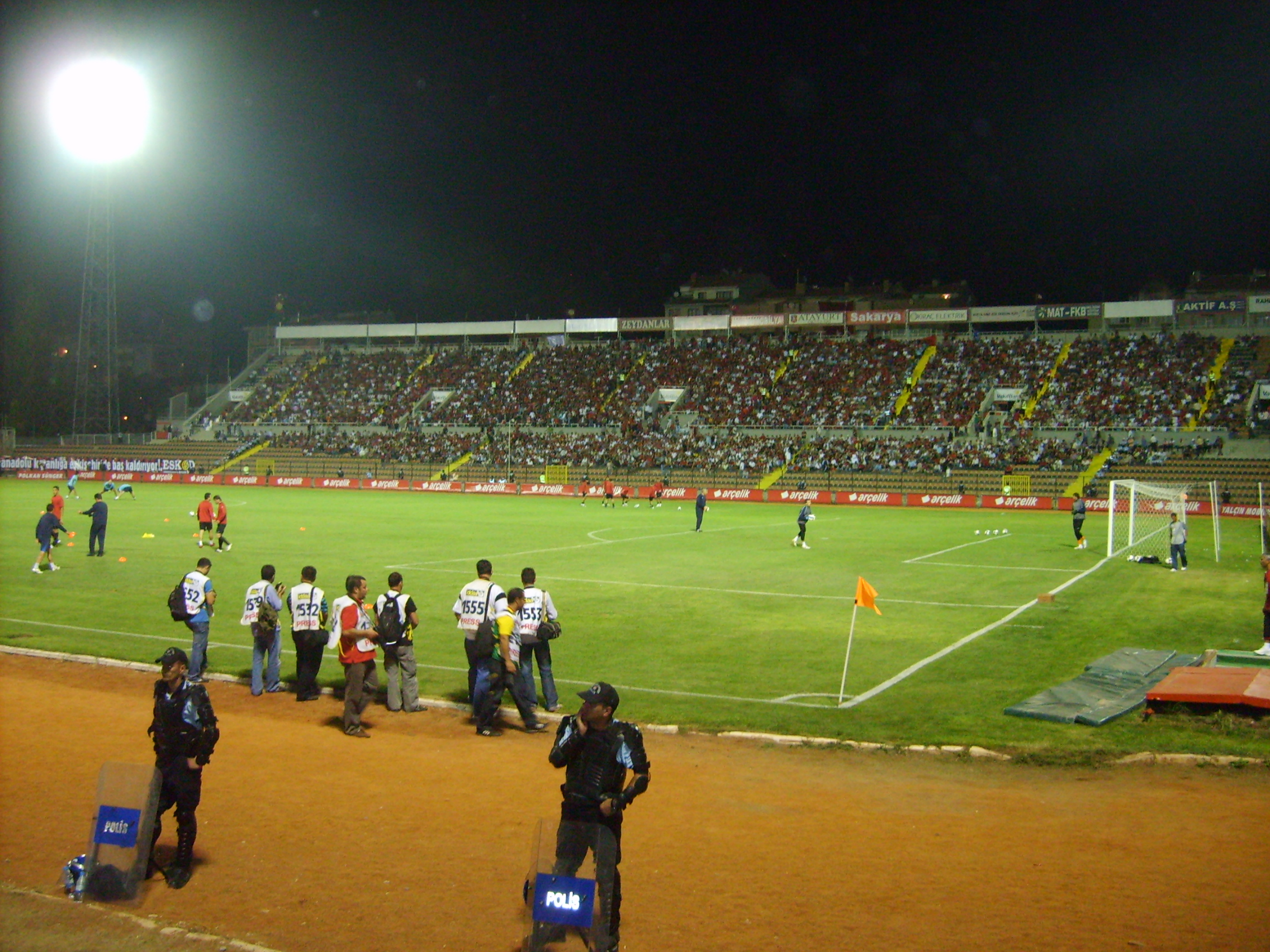
- Interactive map of Eskişehir Atatürk Stadium
- Location: Eskişehir, Turkey
- Owner: Eskişehirspor
- Operator: Eskişehirspor
- Capacity: 13,520
- Surface: Grass

Construction
- Opened: 1953
- Closed: 2016
- Demolished: 2019

Tenant
- Eskişehirspor (Süper Lig)

Eskişehir Atatürk Stadium (Turkish: Eskişehir Atatürk Stadı) was a multi-purpose stadium in Eskişehir, Turkey. Named after the Turkish statesman Mustafa Kemal Atatürk, it was mostly used for football matches as the home ground of Eskişehirspor. The stadium held 13,520 people and was built in 1953. It was burnt down by angry fans in 2016 following the relegation of Eskişehirspor. The team moved to the newly built New Eskişehir Stadium in October 2016, and the venue was demolished in 2019.
