= Gökmen Özdenak =

Turkish footballer (1947–2025)

Personal information
- Date of birth: 22 June 1947
- Place of birth: Adana, Turkey
- Date of death: 31 December 2025 (aged 78)
- Place of death: Istanbul, Turkey
- Height: 1.81 m (5 ft 11 in)
- Position: Striker

Senior career*
Years	Team	Apps	(Gls)
1965–1967	İstanbulspor	15	(5)
1967–1980	Galatasaray	297	(99)
Total		312	(104)

International career
1966	Turkey U18	1	(0)
1970	Turkey U21	4	(0)
1972–1977	Turkey	9	(1)
- * Club domestic league appearances and goals

Gökmen Özdenak (22 June 1947 – 31 December 2025) was a Turkish footballer who played as a striker. He is best known for his stint with Galatasaray, and is known by his nickname Ayı Gökmen (English, "Gökmen the Bear"). He represented the Turkey national team.

== Career ==
Özdenak begun his footballing career with İstanbulspor in the Turkish Süper Lig. Two years later, he transferred to Galatasaray and helped them win four Süper Lig titles as he played there for 13 years.

== Outside football ==
After his footballing career, Özdenak began commentating football with former footballer Ziya Şengül.

== Personal life and death ==
Özdenak was born into a sporting family, as his brothers Yasin and Doğan were also professional footballers. He died on 31 December 2025, at the age of 78.

== Honours ==
Galatasaray

- Süper Lig: 1968-69, 1970-71, 1971-72, 1972-73
- Turkish Cup: 1972–73, 1975–76
- Turkish Super Cup: 1968-69, 1971-72
- Prime Minister's Cup: 1974–1975, 1978–1979
- TSYD Cup: 1968-69, 1970-1971, 1977-1978
