= 1975–76 Galatasaray S.K. season =

Galatasaray
1975–76 season
- President: (Turkey) Selahattin Beyazıt
- Manager: (England) Don Howe
- Stadium: Inönü Stadi
- 1. Lig: 3rd
- Türkiye Kupası: Winner
- UEFA Cup: Second round
- Süper Kupa: Runner-up
- Top goalscorer: League: Şevki Şenlen (11); All: Şevki Şenlen (22)
- Highest home attendance: 42,039 vs Trabzonspor (Türkiye Kupası, 26 May 1976)
- Lowest home attendance: 10,051 vs Giresunspor (1. Lig, 23 May 1976)
- Average home league attendance: 22,797
Home colours	Away colours	Third colours

The 1975–76 season was Galatasaray's 72nd in existence and the club's 18th consecutive season in the Turkish First Football League. This article shows statistics of the club's players in the season, and also lists all matches that the club have played in the season.

== Squad statistics ==
No.	Pos.	Name	1. Lig		Türkiye Kupası		UEFA Cup		Süper Kupa		Total	
No.	Pos.	Name	Apps	Goals	Apps	Goals	Apps	Goals	Apps	Goals	Apps	Goals
-	GK	(Turkey) Yılmaz Pamuk	1	0	0	0	0	0	0	0	1	0
-	GK	(Turkey) Yasin Özdenak	17	0	5	0	2	0	1	0	25	0
-	GK	(Turkey) Nihat Akbay	13	0	4	0	2	0	0	0	19	0
-	DF	(Turkey) Fatih Terim (C)	30	3	8	1	4	0	1	0	43	4
-	DF	(Turkey) Güngör Tekin	21	0	6	0	0	0	1	0	28	0
-	DF	(Turkey) Arif Kuşdoğan	8	0	2	0	0	0	0	0	10	0
-	DF	(Turkey) İsmail Tartan	0	0	1	0	0	0	0	0	1	0
-	DF	(Turkey) Mehmet Aktan	0	0	1	0	0	0	0	0	1	0
-	DF	(Turkey) Ekrem Günalp	13	0	7	0	0	0	0	0	20	0
-	DF	(Turkey) Tuncay Temeller	21	1	5	0	2	0	1	0	29	1
-	DF	(Turkey) Enver Ürekli	10	0	3	0	4	0	0	0	17	0
-	DF	(Turkey) Müfit Erkasap	5	0	2	0	0	0	1	0	8	0
-	DF	(Turkey) Ali Yavaş	23	0	5	1	4	0	1	0	33	1
-	DF	(Turkey) Engin Tuncer	19	0	9	1	3	0	0	0	31	1
-	MF	(Turkey) Bülent Ünder	18	1	6	1	1	0	1	0	26	2
-	DF	(Turkey) Aydın Güleş	16	0	2	1	4	0	0	0	22	1
-	MF	(Turkey) Mehmet Oğuz	24	2	3	0	2	0	1	0	30	2
-	FW	(Turkey) Bülent Şahinkaya	2	0	2	0	0	0	1	0	5	0
-	MF	(Turkey) Mustafa Ergücü	13	0	3	0	3	0	0	0	19	0
-	FW	(Turkey) Fevzi Kezan	3	0	2	0	0	0	1	0	6	0
-	FW	(Turkey) Gökmen Özdenak	24	7	5	1	4	2	0	0	33	10
-	FW	(Turkey) Tarık Küpoğlu	2	0	0	0	4	0	0	0	6	0
-	FW	(Turkey) Metin Kurt	26	5	6	1	4	0	0	0	36	6
-	FW	(Turkey) Zafer Dinçer	5	0	2	0	0	0	0	0	7	0
-	FW	(Turkey) Serdar Gücüyener	2	0	2	0	0	0	1	0	5	0
-	FW	(Turkey) Şevki Şenlenl	27	11	9	8	4	2	1	1	41	22
-	FW	(Turkey) Mehmet Özgül	24	5	9	2	4	1	1	0	38	8

=== Players in / out ===
==== In ====
Pos.	Nat.	Name	Age	Moving to
DF	(Turkey)	Güngör Tekin	22	Giresunspor
FW	(Turkey)	Fevzi Kezan	23	Giresunspor
DF	(Turkey)	Zafer Dinçer	19	Ödemişspor
MF	(Turkey)	Engin Tuncer	25	Manisaspor
FW	(Turkey)	Serdar Gücüyener	21	Sarıyer S.K.
GK	(Turkey)	Yılmaz Pamuk	19	Istanbulspor

==== Out ====
Pos.	Nat.	Name	Age	Moving to
DF	(Turkey)	Muzaffer Sipahi	34	Retired
FW	(Turkey)	Engin Verel	19	Fenerbahçe SK
DF	(Turkey)	Cüneyt Tanman	19	Giresunspor - on loan

== 1. Lig ==
=== Standings ===
Pos	Team	Pld	W	D	L	GF	GA	GD	Pts	Qualification or relegation
1	Trabzonspor (C)	30	17	9	4	36	14	+22	43	Qualification to European Cup first round
2	Fenerbahçe	30	14	12	4	40	18	+22	40	Qualification to UEFA Cup first round
3	Galatasaray	30	12	13	5	36	23	+13	37	Qualification to Cup Winners' Cup first round
4	Adanaspor	30	13	10	7	36	27	+9	36	Qualification to UEFA Cup first round
5	Altay	30	9	12	9	31	32	−1	30	Invitation to Balkans Cup

Rules for classification: 1) points; 2) goal difference; 3) number of goals scored.
(C) Champions

=== Matches ===
7 September 1975 1	Galatasaray SK	1–2	Trabzonspor	Istanbul
17:30 EET	Gökmen Özdenak 53'	(Report)	Mehmet Cemil Altın 43'; Hüseyin Tok 55'	Stadium: Inönü Stadi; Attendance: 40,559; Referee: Ertuğrul Dilek

13 September 1975 2	Galatasaray SK	3–1	MKE Ankaragücü	Istanbul
17:00 EET	Mehmet Oğuz 78'; Şevki Şenlen 85'; Mehmet Özgül 86'	(Report)	Ali Osman Renklibay 36'	Stadium: Inönü Stadi; Attendance: 18,910; Referee: Fehmi Pazarcı

21 September 1975 3	Orduspor	1–1	Galatasaray SK	Ordu
15:30 EET	Salih Aydoğan 8'	(Report)	Şevki Şenlen 72'	Stadium: Ordu 19 Eylül Stadium; Referee: Muzaffer Sarvan

27 September 1975 4	Galatasaray SK	1–1	Altay SK	Istanbul
16:30 EET	Gökmen Özdenak 71'	(Report)	Mustafa Kaplakaslan 33'	Stadium: Inönü Stadi; Attendance: 20,484; Referee: Nihat Özbirgül

5 October 1975 5	Zonguldakspor	0–0	Galatasaray SK	Zonguldak
16:30 EET		(Report)		Stadium: Kemal Köksal Stadi; Referee: Talat Tokat

18 October 1975 6	Galatasaray SK	0–0	Boluspor	Istanbul
16:00 EET		(Report)		Stadium: Inönü Stadi; Attendance: 20,152; Referee: Nevzat Tansuk

1 November 1975 7	Adanaspor	0–0	Galatasaray SK	Adana
15:15 EET		(Report)		Stadium: Adana 5 Ocak Stadı; Referee: Muzaffer Sarvan

9 November 1975 8	Galatasaray SK	1–0	Beşiktaş JK	Istanbul
18:00 EET	Lütfü Isıgöllül 52' (o.g.)	(Report)		Stadium: Inönü Stadi; Attendance: 24,982; Referee: Ertuğrul Dilek

16 November 1975 9	Balıkesirspor	1–0	Galatasaray SK	Balıkesir
14:15 EET	Özer Umdu 33'	(Report)		Stadium: Atatürk Stadı; Referee: Yılgör Öktem

30 November 1975 10	Eskişehirspor	1–1	Galatasaray SK	Eskişehir
13:45 EET	Halil Ağan 82'	(Report)	Şevki Şenlen 16'	Stadium: Atatürk Stadı; Referee: Fehmi Pazarcı

7 December 1975 11	Galatasaray SK	3–0	Adana Demirspor	Istanbul
14:00 EET	Tuncay Temeller 54' (pen.); Fatih Terim 64'; Şevki Şenlen 72'	(Report)		Stadium: Inönü Stadi; Attendance: 10,994; Referee: Nihat Özbirgül

14 December 1975 12	Fenerbahçe SK	1–3	Galatasaray SK	Istanbul
14:00 EET	Cemil Turan 21'	(Report)	Gökmen Özdenak 32'; Fatih Terim 71'; Şevki Şenlen 80'	Stadium: Inönü Stadi; Attendance: 39,671; Referee: Ertuğrul Dilek

28 December 1975 13	Galatasaray SK	1–1	Bursaspor	Istanbul
14:00 EET	Şevki Şenlen 43'	(Report)	Tacettin Ergürsel 37'	Stadium: Inönü Stadi; Attendance: 22,907; Referee: Talat Tokat

4 January 1976 14	Giresunspor	1–1	Galatasaray SK	Giresun
13:00 EET	Mazlum Fırtına 70'	(Report)	Şevki Şenlen 67'	Stadium: Atatürk Stadi; Referee: Muzaffer Sarvan

10 January 1976 15	Galatasaray SK	1–0	Göztepe SK	Istanbul
14:00 EET	Metin Kurt 6'	(Report)		Stadium: Inönü Stadi; Attendance: 20,725; Referee: Ertuğrul Aybay

15 February 1976 16	Trabzonspor	1–0	Galatasaray SK	Trabzon
13:30 EET	Hüseyin Tok 49'	(Report)		Stadium: Hüseyin Avni Aker Stadi; Referee: Nihat Özbirgül

22 February 1976 17	MKE Ankaragücü	2–4	Galatasaray SK	Ankara
14:15 EET	Ali Osman Renklibay 17', 44'	(Report)	Mehmet Özgül 7', 14'; Metin Kurt 76'; Şevki Şenlen 81'	Stadium: 19 Mayıs Stadı; Referee: Muzaffer Sarvan

28 February 1976 18	Galatasaray	0–0	Orduspor	Istanbul
14:30 EET		(Report)		Stadium: Inönü Stadi; Attendance: 22,025; Referee: Yavuz Tunç

7 March 1976 19	Altay SK	1–3	Galatasaray	Izmir
15:00 EET	Mustafa Denizli 30' (pen.)	(Report)	Gökmen Özdenak 13', 62'; Metin Kurt 56'	Stadium: Atatürk Stadı; Attendance: 21,466; Referee: Nevzat Tansuk

14 March 1976 20	Galatasaray SK	2–0	Zonguldakspor	Istanbul
15:00 EET	Mehmet Özgül 18'; Metin Kurt 23'	(Report)		Stadium: Inönü Stadi; Attendance: 21,287; Referee: Yılgör Öktem

21 March 1976 21	Boluspor	0–1	Galatasaray	Bolu
14:00 EET		(Report)	Mehmet Oğuz 78'	Stadium: Bolu Atatürk Stadium; Referee: Ertuğrul Aybay

27 March 1976 22	Galatasaray	2–1	Adanaspor	Istanbul
16:00 EET	Gökmen Özdenak 42', 55'	(Report)	Şevket Kesler 44'	Stadium: Inönü Stadi; Attendance: 33,928; Referee: Orhan Cebe

4 April 1976 23	Beşiktaş J.K.	1–1	Galatasaray SK	Istanbul
16:00 EET	Adem Kurukaya 60'	(Report)	Metin Kurt 80'	Stadium: Inönü Stadi; Attendance: 41,865; Referee: Doğan Babacan

11 April 1976 24	Galatasaray	2–0	Balikesirspor	Istanbul
16:00 EET	Mehmet Özgül 29'; Fatih Terim 59' (pen.)	(Report)		Stadium: Inönü Stadi; Attendance: 10,739; Referee: Yılgör Öktem

17 April 1976 25	Galatasaray SK	1–1	Eskişehirspor	Istanbul
16:00 EET	Şevki Şenlen 72'	(Report)	Hüdai Doğu 54'	Stadium: Inönü Stadi; Attendance: 22,405; Referee: Muzaffer Sarvan

25 April 1976 26	Adana Demirspor	0–0	Galatasaray SK	Adana
16:00 EET		(Report)		Stadium: 5 Ocak Stadi; Referee: Ziya Türkdoğan

9 May 1976 27	Galatasaray SK	1–0	Fenerbahçe SK	Istanbul
16:30 EET	Şevki Şenlen 73'	(Report)		Stadium: Inönü Stadi; Attendance: 41,806; Referee: Ertuğrul Dilek

16 May 1976 28	Bursaspor	1–1	Galatasaray SK	Bursa
16:30 EET	Tacettin Ergürsel 66'	(Report)	Bülent Ünder 7'	Stadium: Bursa Atatürk Stadı; Referee: Fehmi Pazarcı

23 May 1976 29	Galatasaray SK	1–3	Giresunspor	Istanbul
17:00 EET	Şevki Şenlen 7'	(Report)	Müjdat Karanfilci 2', 14'; Mazlum Fırtına 64'	Stadium: Inönü Stadi; Attendance: 10,051; Referee: Müşfik Talas

30 May 1976 30	Göztepe SK	2–0	Galatasaray SK	İzmir
17:00 EET	Mehmet Türken 20'; Sebahattin Akgül 41'	(Report)		Stadium: İzmir Atatürk Stadı; Attendance: 17,017; Referee: Ertuğrul Aybay

== Turkiye Kupasi ==
=== Round of 32 ===
24 December 1975 1	Eskişehir Demirspor	2–1	Galatasaray SK	Eskişehir
13:45 EET	İsmail 4'; Reşit Güner 11'	(Report)	Şevki Şenlen 59'	Stadium: Eskişehir Atatürk Stadium; Referee: Ziya Türkdoğan

7 January 1976 2	Galatasaray SK	7–0	Eskişehir Demirspor	Istanbul
14:00 EET	Aydın Güleş 7'; Metin Kurt 11'; Şevki Şenlen 56', 62', 78', 84'; Fatih Terim 75'	(Report)		Stadium: Inönü Stadi; Referee: Nevzat Tansuk

=== Round of 16 ===
18 February 1976 1	Adanaspor	0–1	Galatasaray SK	Adana
18:30 EET		(Report)	Şevki Şenlen 57'	Stadium: Adana 5 Ocak Stadı; Referee: Yılgör Öktem

26 February 1976 2	Galatasaray SK	2–0	Adanaspor	Istanbul
14:30 EET	Şevki Şenlen 18'; Ali Yavaş 69'	(Report)		Stadium: Inönü Stadi; Attendance: 5,234; Referee: Ertuğrul Aybay

=== 1/4 Final ===
10 March 1976 1	Galatasaray SK	3–1	Beşiktaş JK	Istanbul
14:30 EET	Gökmen Özdenak 40'; Engin Tuncer 48'; Mehmet Özgül 73'	(Report)	Tezcan Ozan 10'	Stadium: Inönü Stadi; Attendance: 40,478; Referee: Doğan Babacan

=== 1/2 Final ===
7 April 1976 1	MKE Ankaragücü	1–1	Galatasaray SK	Ankara
19:00 EET	Ali Osman Renklibay 76'	(Report)	Şevki Şenlen 7'	Stadium: 19 Mayıs Stadı; Referee: Orhan Cebe

21 April 1976 2	Galatasaray SK	1–0	MKE Ankaragücü	Istanbul
17:00 EET	Mehmet Özgül 71'	(Report)		Stadium: Inönü Stadi; Attendance: 14,720; Referee: Fehmi Pazarcı

=== Final ===
12 May 1976 1	Trabzonspor	1–0	Galatasaray SK	Trabzon
15:00 EET	Necmi Perekli 44'	(Report)		Stadium: Hüseyin Avni Aker Stadium; Attendance: 12,000; Referee: iya Türkdoğan

26 May 1976 1	Galatasaray SK	1–0	Trabzonspor	Istanbul
17:30 EET	Bülent Ünder 49'	(Report)		Stadium: Inönü Stadi; Attendance: 42,039; Referee: Orhan Cebe

== UEFA Cup ==
=== Round of 64 ===
17 September 1975 1	Rapid Wien	1–0	Galatasaray SK	Vienna
00:00 EET	Kurt Widmann 77'	(Report)		Stadium: Ernst-Happel-Stadion; Referee: (Czech Republic) Jan Kmec

1 October 1975 2	Galatasaray SK	3–1	Rapid Wien	Istanbul
	Şevki Şenlen 36'; Gökmen Özdenak 56', 87'	(Report)	Johann Krankl 60'	Stadium: Inönü Stadi; Attendance: 26,071; Referee: (Switzerland) Jean Dubach

=== Round of 32 ===
22 October 1975 1	Galatasaray SK	2–4	Torpedo Moscow	Istanbul
	Mehmet Özgül 55'; Şevki Şenlen 57'	(Report)	Enver Ürekli 11' (o.g.); Evgeniy Khrabrostin 30', 83'; Vladimir Sakharov 59' (pen.)	Stadium: Inönü Stadi; Attendance: 38,561; Referee: (Italy) Alberto Michelotti

5 November 1975 2	Torpedo Moscow	3–0	Galatasaray SK	Moscow
	Anatoli Degtiariev 27'; Vladimir Sakharov 68' (pen.); Vladimir Buturlakin 74'	(Report)		Stadium: Luzhniki Stadium; Attendance: 1,500; Referee: (Finland) Olavi Peltola

== Süper Kupa-Cumhurbaşkanlığı Kupası ==
Kick-off listed in local time (EET)

9 June 1976 1	Trabzonspor	2–1	Galatasaray SK	Ankara
18:00 EET	Hüseyin Tok 4', 29'	(Report)	Şevki Şenlen 35'	Stadium: Ankara 19 Mayıs Stadium; Referee: Ziya Türkdoğan

== Friendly match ==
=== TSYD Kupası ===
6 August 1975 1	Galatasaray SK	5–1	Beşiktaş JK	Istanbul
20:45 EET	Mehmet Özgül 7', 30'; Şevki Şenlen 15'; Metin Kurt 74'; Gökmen Özdenak 85'	(Report)	Tezcan Ozan 32'	Stadium: İnönü Stadı; Attendance: 41,888; Referee: Doğan Babacan

9 August 1975 2	Fenerbahçe SK	3–1	Galatasaray SK	Istanbul
20:45 EET	Osman Arpacıoğlu 16'; Ömer Kaner 63', 85'	(Report)	Gökmen Özdenak 60'	Stadium: İnönü Stadı; Attendance: 41,653; Referee: Ertuğrul Dilek

16 August 1975 3	Trabzonspor	2–1	Galatasaray SK	Istanbul
18:30 EET	Hüseyin Tok 30'; İhsan Sakallıoğlu 46'	(Report)	Fatih Terim 72'	Stadium: İnönü Stadı; Referee: Kemal Akay

=== Muzaffer Sipahi Testimonial match ===
27 August 1975 1	Galatasaray SK	3–4	Fenerbahçe SK	Istanbul
15:00 EET	Gökmen Özdenak 10'; Tuncay Temeller 43' (pen.); Mustafa Ergücü 90'	(Report)	Ömer Kaner 7'; Osman Arpacıoğlu 55', 62', 90'	Stadium: İnönü Stadı; Attendance: 24,329; Referee: Doğan Babacan

=== Sabri Dino Testimonial match ===
13 August 1975 1	Beşiktaş JK	1–1	Galatasaray SK	Istanbul
15:00 EET	Ceyhun Güray 17'	(Report)	Mehmet Özgül 35'	Stadium: İnönü Stadı; Attendance: 22,186; Referee: Doğan Babacan

== Attendance ==
Competition	Av. Att.	Total Att.
1. Lig	22,797	341,954
Türkiye Kupası	25,618	102,471
ECWC	32,316	64,632
Total	24,241	509,057
