= 1974–75 Galatasaray S.K. season =

Galatasaray
1974–75 season
- President: Mustafa Pekin
- Manager: Jack Mansell
- Stadium: Inönü Stadi
- 1. Lig: 2nd
- Türkiye Kupası: 1/4 final
- Top goalscorer: League: Mehmet Özgül (11); All: Mehmet Özgül (12)
- Highest home attendance: 42,480 vs Beşiktaş JK (23 February 1975)
- Lowest home attendance: 8,208 vs Altay SK (17 May 1975)
- Average home league attendance: 23,496
Home colours	Away colours	Third colours

The 1974–75 season was Galatasaray's 71st in existence and the club's 17th consecutive season in the Turkish First Football League. This article shows statistics of the club's players in the season, and also lists all matches that the club have played in the season.

== Squad statistics ==
No.	Pos.	Name	1. Lig		Türkiye Kupası		Total	
No.	Pos.	Name	Apps	Goals	Apps	Goals	Apps	Goals
-	GK	(Turkey) Yasin Özdenak (C)	29	0	3	0	32	0
-	GK	(Turkey) Nihat Akbay	1	0	3	0	4	0
-	DF	(Turkey) Fatih Terim	30	2	6	1	36	3
-	DF	(Turkey) Muzaffer Sipahi	13	0	3	0	16	0
-	DF	(Turkey) Arif Kuşdoğan	1	0	1	0	2	0
-	DF	(Turkey) İsmail Tartan	0	0	0	0	0	0
-	DF	(Turkey) Furkan Ölçer	0	0	1	0	1	0
-	DF	(Turkey) Ekrem Günalp	23	2	5	0	28	2
-	DF	(Turkey) Tuncay Temeller	25	2	6	1	31	3
-	DF	(Turkey) Enver Ürekli	23	2	3	0	26	2
-	DF	(Turkey) Müfit Erkasap	2	0	0	0	2	0
-	DF	(Turkey) Ali Yavaş	20	0	4	0	24	0
-	DF	(Turkey) Cüneyt Tanman	0	0	2	0	2	0
-	MF	(Turkey) Bülent Ünder	13	0	4	0	17	0
-	DF	(Turkey) Aydın Güleş	12	0	0	0	12	0
-	MF	(Turkey) Mehmet Oğuz	23	4	4	0	27	4
-	FW	(Turkey) Bülent Şahinkaya	0	0	0	0	0	0
-	MF	(Turkey) Mustafa Ergücü	25	1	4	0	29	1
-	FW	(Turkey) Gökmen Özdenak	23	5	2	0	25	5
-	FW	(Turkey) Tarık Küpoğlu	0	0	0	0	0	0
-	FW	(Turkey) Tahir Karacan	0	0	1	0	1	0
-	FW	(Turkey) Metin Kurt	29	4	4	0	33	4
-	FW	(Turkey) Engin Verel	27	2	5	3	32	5
-	FW	(Turkey) Yılmaz Yavman	6	0	2	0	8	0
-	FW	(Turkey) Şevki Şenlenl	28	1	6	0	34	1
-	FW	(Turkey) Yetiş Kaya	0	0	0	0	0	0
-	FW	(Turkey) Mehmet Özgül	21	11	4	1	25	12

=== Players in / out ===
==== In ====
Pos.	Nat.	Name	Age	Moving from
DF	(Turkey)	Fatih Terim	21	Adana Demirspor
DF	(Turkey)	Ali Yavaş	24	Altay SK
FW	(Turkey)	Yılmaz Yavman	25	Altay SK
DF	(Turkey)	Müfit Erkasap	17	Galatasaray U21
DF	(Turkey)	Furkan Ölçer	18	Galatasaray U21

==== Out ====
Pos.	Nat.	Name	Age	Moving to
MF	(Turkey)	Ahmet Akkuş	30	Zonguldakspor
FW	(Turkey)	Suphi Soylu	25	Sakaryaspor
DW	(Turkey)	Samim Yağız	24	Sakaryaspor

== 1. Lig ==
=== Standings ===
Pos	Team	Pld	W	D	L	GF	GA	GD	Pts	Qualification or relegation
1	Fenerbahçe (C)	30	15	13	2	43	18	+25	43	Qualification to European Cup first round
2	Galatasaray	30	16	6	8	36	24	+12	38	Qualification to UEFA Cup first round
3	Eskişehirspor	30	11	13	6	27	19	+8	35	Qualification to UEFA Cup first round
4	Adanaspor	30	12	9	9	38	25	+13	33	Invitation to Balkans Cup
5	Beşiktaş	30	11	11	8	29	24	+5	33	Qualification to Cup Winners' Cup first round

Rules for classification: 1) points; 2) goal difference; 3) number of goals scored.
(C) Champions

=== Matches ===
7 September 1974 1	Galatasaray SK	2–0	Giresunspor	Istanbul
17:00 EET	Mehmet Özgül 47', 75'	(Report)		Stadium: Inönü Stadi; Attendance: 27,407; Referee: Fehmi Pazarcı

15 September 1974 2	Eskişehirspor	0–0	Galatasaray SK	Eskişehir
16:00 EET		(Report)		Stadium: Eskişehir Atatürk Stadı; Referee: Talat Tokat

21 September 1974 3	Galatasaray	1–0	Adanaspor	Istanbul
16:30 EET	Gökmen Özdenak 17'	(Report)		Stadium: Inönü Stadi; Attendance: 30,770; Referee: Ziya Türkdoğan

29 September 1974 4	Beşiktaş J.K.	0–0	Galatasaray SK	Istanbul
15:15 EET		(Report)		Stadium: Inönü Stadi; Attendance: 22,133; Referee: Doğan Babacan

6 October 1974 5	Bursaspor	0–2	Galatasaray SK	Bursa
16:00 EET		(Report)	Mehmet Özgül 23'; Engin Verel 55'	Stadium: Bursa Atatürk Stadı; Referee: Muzaffer Sarvan

13 October 1974 6	Galatasaray SK	3–1	MKE Ankaragücü	Istanbul
16:00 EET	Mehmet Oğuz 6', 61' (pen.); Mehmet Özgül 64'	(Report)	Ali Osman Renklibay 76' (pen.)	Stadium: Inönü Stadi; Attendance: 35,625; Referee: Orhan Cebe

20 October 1974 7	Göztepe SK	0–2	Galatasaray SK	İzmir
16:00 EET		(Report)	Mehmet Özgül 26'; Mehmet Oğuz 52'	Stadium: İzmir Atatürk Stadium; Referee: Yılgör Öktem

27 October 1974 8	Fenerbahçe SK	0–0	Galatasaray SK	Istanbul
20:30 EET		(Report)		Stadium: Inönü Stadi; Attendance: 16,709; Referee: Ertuğrul Dilek

3 November 1974 9	Galatasaray SK	2–1	Samsunspor	Istanbul
15:30 EET	Fatih Terim 43'; Metin Kurt 87'	(Report)	Adem Kurukaya 30'	Stadium: Inönü Stadi; Attendance: 23,889; Referee: Muzaffer Sarvan

24 November 1974 10	Galatasaray SK	2–0	Kayserispor	Istanbul
14:00 EET	Mehmet Özgül 51', 68'	(Report)		Stadium: Inönü Stadi; Attendance: 22,549; Referee: Nihat Özbirgül

8 December 1974 11	Adana Demirspor	2–0	Galatasaray SK	Adana
13:15 EET	Halis Reçber 19'; Rasin Gürcan 60'	(Report)		Stadium: 5 Ocak Stadi; Referee: Talat Tokat

14 December 1974 12	Galatasaray SK	3–0	Zonguldakspor	Istanbul
14:00 EET	Mehmet Özgül 75', 87'; Enver Ürekli 88'	(Report)		Stadium: Inönü Stadi; Attendance: 18,124; Referee: Fehmi Pazarcı

22 December 1974 13	Altay SK	1–2	Galatasaray	İzmir
14:00 EET	Necmi Perekli 7'	(Report)	Tuncay Temeller 51'; Mehmet Özgül 87'	Stadium: İzmir Atatürk Stadium; Referee: Yılgör Öktem

29 December 1974 14	Galatasaray SK	1–0	Trabzonspor	Istanbul
14:00 EET	Ekrem Günalp 89'	(Report)		Stadium: Inönü Stadi; Attendance: 42,166; Referee: Orhan Cebe

5 January 1975 15	Boluspor	0–1	Galatasaray	Bolu
13:30 EET		(Report)	Şevki Şenlen 38'	Stadium: Bolu Atatürk Stadi; Referee: Nihat Özbirgül

2 February 1975 16	Giresunspor	1–1	Galatasaray SK	Giresun
14:00 EET	Tacettin Ergürsel 67'	(Report)	Metin Kurt 74'	Stadium: Atatürk Stadi; Referee: Yılgör Öktem

10 February 1975 17	Galatasaray SK	0–0	Eskişehirspor	Istanbul
14:00 EET		(Report)		Stadium: Inönü Stadi; Attendance: 10,056; Referee: Ertuğrul Aybay

16 February 1975 18	Adanaspor	3–1	Galatasaray SK	Adana
14:00 EET	İsa Ertürk 34'; Reşit Kaynak 43'; Köksal Mesçi 60'	(Report)	Metin Kurt 26'	Stadium: Adana 5 Ocak Stadı; Referee: Muzaffer Sarvan

23 February 1975 19	Galatasaray SK	1–2	Beşiktaş JK	Istanbul
14:30 EET	Mehmet Oğuz 88'	(Report)	Tezcan Ozan 65'; Sinan Alayoğlu 68'	Stadium: Inönü Stadi; Attendance: 42,480; Referee: Ertuğrul Dilek

9 March 1975 20	MKE Ankaragücü	2–0	Galatasaray SK	Ankara
14:30 EET	Ali Osman Renklibay 44', 63'	(Report)		Stadium: Cebeci İnönü Stadı; Referee: Muzaffer Sarvan

16 March 1975 21	Galatasaray SK	2–1	Göztepe SK	Istanbul
14:30 EET	Tuncay Temeller 32' (pen.); Fatih Terim 49'	(Report)	Mehmet Türken 43'	Stadium: Inönü Stadi; Attendance: 23,344; Referee: Yılgör Öktem

23 March 1975 22	Galatasaray SK	0–1	Fenerbahçe SK	Istanbul
16:30 EET		(Report)	Arif Aydın Çelik 86'	Stadium: Inönü Stadi; Attendance: 19,870; Referee: Doğan Babacan

6 April 1975 23	Galatasaray SK	1–0	Bursaspor	Istanbul
16:00 EET	Engin Verel 53'	(Report)		Stadium: Inönü Stadi; Attendance: 20,347; Referee: Muzaffer Sarvan

13 April 1975 24	Samsunspor	1–2	Galatasaray SK	Samsun
16:00 EET	Ömer Kuranel 86'	(Report)	Gökmen Özdenak 57'; Metin Kurt 64'	Stadium: Samsun 19 Mayıs Stadı; Referee: Nihat Özbirgül

21 April 1975 25	Kayserispor	1–1	Galatasaray SK	Kayserispor
16:00 EET	Osman Nuri Turhan 51'	(Report)	Mustafa Ergücü 7'	Stadium: Kayseri Atatürk Stadı; Referee: Nihat Özbirgül

4 May 1975 26	Galatasaray SK	4–2	Adana Demirspor	Istanbul
16:30 EET	Gökmen Özdenak 15', 85'; Enver Ürekli 16'; Mehmet Özgül 27'	(Report)	Hasan Özden 12'; Raşit Karasu 76'	Stadium: Inönü Stadi; Attendance: n/a Referee: Yılgör Öktem

11 May 1975 27	Zonguldakspor	3–0	Galatasaray SK	Zonguldak
15:30 EET	Turgut Öndül 42'; Halil Güngördü 59'; Şaban Kartal 70'	(Report)		Stadium: Kemal Köksal Stadi; Referee: Nihat Özbirgül

17 May 1975 28	Galatasaray SK	0–1	Altay SK	Istanbul
16:30 EET		(Report)	Orhan Kırıkçılar 71'	Stadium: Inönü Stadi; Attendance: 8,208; Referee: Ziya Türkdoğan

25 May 1975 29	Trabzonspor	1–0	Galatasaray SK	Trabzon
16:30 EET	Hüseyin Tok 14'	(Report)		Stadium: Hüseyin Avni Aker Stadi; Referee: Macit Sarıdana

31 May 1975 30	Galatasaray SK	2–0	Boluspor	Istanbul
17:30 EET	Gökmen Özdenak 43'; Ekrem Günalp 81'	(Report)		Stadium: Inönü Stadi; Attendance: 4,111; Referee: Ertuğrul Aybay

== Turkiye Kupasi ==
=== Round of 32 ===
30 October 1974 1	Galatasaray SK	1–0	Altay SK	Istanbul
15:45 EET	Engin Verel 34'	(Report)		Stadium: Inönü Stadi; Attendance: 14,723; Referee: Ertuğrul Aybay

4 December 1974 2	Altay SK	0–0	Galatasaray	İzmir
13:45 EET		(Report)		Stadium: İzmir Atatürk Stadium; Referee: Macit Sarıdana

=== Round of 16 ===
25 December 1974 1	Sakaryaspor	0–1	Galatasaray SK	Adapazarı
13:15 EET		(Report)	Engin Verel 21'	Stadium: Sakarya Atatürk Stadı; Referee: İlhan Özkan

8 January 1975 2	Galatasaray SK	1–0	Sakaryaspor	Istanbul
14:00 EET	Mehmet Özgül 68'	(Report)		Stadium: Inönü Stadi; Attendance: n/a Referee: Nebil Soyutürk

=== 1/4 Final ===
30 January 1975 1	Boluspor	0–2	Galatasaray	Istanbul
14:30 EET		(Report)	Tuncay Temeller 10' (pen.); Fatih Terim 89'	Stadium: Inönü Stadi; Referee: Muzaffer Sarvan

13 February 1975 2	Galatasaray SK	1–3	Boluspor	Istanbul
14:00 EET	Engin Verel 72'	(Report)	Ekrem Günalp 12' (o.g.); Şükrü Aydın 39' (pen.); Alaattin 44'	Stadium: Inönü Stadi; Attendance: 10,198; Referee: İhsan Türe

== Başbakanlık Kupası ==
7 June 1975	Galatasaray SK	1–0	Trabzonspor	Ankaral
17:00 EET	Gökmen Özdenak 76'	(Report)		Stadium: Cebeci İnönü Stadı; Attendance: 20,000; Referee: Talat Tokat

== Friendly match ==
=== Donanma Vakfı Kupası ===
27 July 1974 1/2 Final	Beşiktaş JK	1–4	Galatasaray SK	Istanbul
20:00 EET	Sinan Alayoğlu 40' (pen.)	(Report)	Fatih Terim 10'; Metin Kurt 18', 85'; Engin Verel 61'	Stadium: İnönü Stadı; Attendance: 29,704; Referee: Doğan Babacan

28 July 1974 Final	Fenerbahçe SK	1–0	Galatasaray SK	Istanbul
20:00 EET	Mustafa Kaplakaslan 47'	(Report)		Stadium: İnönü Stadı; Attendance: 40,568; Referee: Hilmi Ok

=== TSYD Kupası ===
3 August 1974 1	Fenerbahçe SK	2–1	Galatasaray SK	Istanbul
20:00 EET	Osman Arpacıoğlu 6', 86'	(Report)	Mehmet Özgül 18'	Stadium: İnönü Stadı; Attendance: 41,958; Referee: Müfit Sun

10 August 1974 1	Galatasaray SK	0–1	Beşiktaş JK	Istanbul
20:00 EET		(Report)	Tezcan Ozan 88'	Stadium: İnönü Stadı; Attendance: 24,699; Referee: Hilmi Ok

=== Ali Sami Yen - Şeref Bey Kupası ===
19 August 1974	Beşiktaş JK	2–2	Galatasaray SK	Istanbul
15:00 EET	Sinan Alayoğlu 20' (pen.); Ünal Tombulel 74'	(Report)	Metin Kurt 13'; Mehmet Oğuz 68'	Stadium: Mithatpaşa Stadi; Attendance: 13,328; Referee: Kemal Akay

=== Zafer Kupası ===
28 August 1974	Beşiktaş JK	2–1	Galatasaray SK	İzmir
15:00 EET	Tuğrul Şener 30'; Sinan Alayoğlu 56'	(Report)	Cüneyt Tanman 86'	Stadium: İzmir Atatürk Stadium; Attendance: 42,907; Referee: Orhan Cebe

=== Hasan Tahsin Kupası ===
12 January 1975	Galatasaray SK	1–0	Beşiktaş JK	İzmir
15:00 EET	Engin Verel 21'	(Report)		Stadium: İzmir Atatürk Stadium; Attendance: 15,808; Referee: Yavuz Tunç

=== Quad-tournament ===
18 January 1975	Galatasaray SK	2–0	PFC Slavia Sofia	Istanbul
15:00 EET	Mehmet Özgül 11'; Fatih Terim 49'			Stadium: Inönü Stadi; Attendance: 22,384; Referee: Kemal Akay

19 January 1975	Galatasaray SK	2–1	Trabzonspor	Istanbul
12:45 EET	Mustafa Ergücü 70'; Fatih Terim 80'	(Report)	Cemil Usta 22'	Stadium: Inönü Stadi; Attendance: 20,540; Referee: Erkan Göksel

=== Barış Kupası ===
21 January 1975	Trabzonspor	2–1	Galatasaray SK	Girne
13:30 EET	Mehmet Cemil Altın 64'; Hüseyin Tok 85'	(Report)	Gökmen Özdenak 63'	Stadium: Karaoğlanoğlu Stadı; Attendance: 10,000; Referee: Doğan Babacan

=== Friendly match ===
30 March 1975	Beşiktaş JK	1–3	Galatasaray SK	Istanbul
20:00 EET	Ahmet Yılmaz 32'	(Report)	Fatih Terim 55'; Mustafa Ergücü 56'; Gökmen Özdenak 60'	Stadium: İnönü Stadı; Attendance: 40,000; Referee: Emin Tuncalı

== Attendance ==
Competition	Av. Att.	Total Att.
1. Lig	23,496	328,946
Türkiye Kupası	12,461	24,921
Total	22,117	353,867
