= 1970–71 Galatasaray S.K. season =

Galatasaray 1970–71 football season

Galatasaray
1970–71 season
- President: (Turkey) Selahattin Beyazıt
- Manager: (Turkey) Coşkun Özarı
- Stadium: Ali Sami Yen Stadi
- 1.Lig: 1st
- Türkiye Kupası: 1/4 final
- Süper Kupa: Runner-up
- Top goalscorer: League: Gökmen Özdenak (10); Metin Kurt (10); All: Gökmen Özdenak (14)
- Highest home attendance: 35,957 vs Bursaspor (1. Lig, 14 February 1971)
- Lowest home attendance: 11,916 vs Sivas Demirspor (Türkiye Kupası, 23 January 1971)
- Average home league attendance: 23,761
Home colours	Away colours	Third colours

The 1970–71 season was Galatasaray's 67th in existence and the 13th consecutive season in the 1. Lig. This article shows statistics of the club's players in the season, and also lists all matches that the club have played in the season.

== Squad statistics ==
No.	Pos.	Name	1. Lig		Türkiye Kupası		Süper Kupa		Total	
No.	Pos.	Name	Apps	Goals	Apps	Goals	Apps	Goals	Apps	Goals
1	GK	(Turkey) Yasin Özdenak	27	0	1	0	1	0	29	0
-	GK	(Turkey) Nihat Akbay	4	0	3	0	0	0	7	0
-	DF	(Turkey) Samim Yağız	5	0	0	0	0	0	5	0
-	DF	(Turkey) Muzaffer Sipahi	30	0	3	0	1	0	34	0
-	DF	(Turkey) Ergün Acuner	26	8	2	2	1	0	29	10
-	DF	(Turkey) Tuncay Temeller	27	1	3	0	1	0	31	1
-	DF	(Turkey) Ekrem Günalp	30	1	3	0	1	0	34	1
-	MF	(Turkey) Aydın Güleş	27	2	4	0	1	0	32	2
-	MF	(Turkey) Bülent Ünder	0	0	2	0	1	0	3	0
-	MF	(Turkey) Ahmet Akkuş	23	6	2	0	1	0	26	6
-	MF	(Turkey) Mehmet Oğuz	12	3	2	0	1	0	15	3
-	MF	(Turkey) Talat Özkarslı(C)	3	0	1	0	0	0	4	0
-	MF	(Turkey) Savaş Yarbay	12	0	2	0	0	0	14	0
-	FW	(Turkey) Ayhan Elmastaşoğlu	6	0	1	0	0	0	7	0
-	FW	(Turkey) Uğur Köken	29	2	3	0	0	0	32	2
-	FW	(Turkey) Avram Kalpin	1	0	0	0	0	0	1	0
-	FW	(Turkey) Suphi Soylu	21	1	2	1	1	0	24	2
-	FW	(Turkey) Metin Kurt	24	10	4	2	1	1	29	13
9	FW	(Turkey) Gökmen Özdenak	26	10	4	3	1	1	31	14
-	FW	(Turkey) Olcay Başarır	24	4	3	0	1	0	28	4
-	FW	(Turkey) Cengiz Erkazan	5	1	1	0	0	0	6	1

=== Players in / out ===
==== In ====
Pos.	Nat.	Name	Age	Moving from
FW	(Turkey)	Metin Kurt	22	PTT SK
MF	(Turkey)	Aydın Güleş	26	PTT SK
DF	(Turkey)	Tuncay Temeller	22	PTT SK
MF	(Turkey)	Ahmet Akkuş	26	Kütahyaspor
DF	(Turkey)	Tarık Küpoğlu	22	Sarıyer S.K.
FW	(Turkey)	Suphi Soylu	21	Sarıyer S.K.
DF	(Turkey)	Yıldırım Benayyat	24	Şekerspor
MF	(Turkey)	Savaş Yarbay	24	Aydınspor
FW	(Turkey)	Avram Kalpin	29	Beyoğlu S.K.
FW	(Turkey)	Cengiz Erkazan	24	Şekerspor

==== Out ====
Pos.	Nat.	Name	Age	Moving to
MF	(Turkey)	Turan Doğangün	35	retired
GK	(Turkey)	Varol Ürkmez	33	Manisaspor

== 1.Lig ==
=== Standings ===
Pos	Team	Pld	W	D	L	GF	GA	GD	Pts	Qualification or relegation
1	Galatasaray (C)	30	17	8	5	51	18	+33	42	Qualification to European Cup first round
2	Fenerbahçe	30	14	13	3	43	23	+20	41	Qualification to UEFA Cup first round
3	Göztepe A.Ş.	30	14	9	7	38	21	+17	37	Invitation to Balkans Cup
4	Eskişehirspor	30	10	14	6	29	24	+5	34	Qualification to Cup Winners' Cup first round
5	Bursaspor	30	11	12	7	25	25	0	34	

Rules for classification: 1) points; 2) goal difference; 3) number of goals scored.
(C) Champions

=== Matches ===
20 September 1970 1	Bursaspor	1–0	Galatasaray SK	Bursa
15:45 EET	Mesut Şen 9'	(Report)		Stadium: Atatürk Stadı; Referee: Cezmi Başar

26 September 1970 2	Galatasaray SK	2–0	Vefa SK	Istanbul
15:30 EET	Ergün Acuner 5' (pen.); Gökmen Özdenak 47'	(Report)		Stadium: Ali Sami Yen Stadi; Attendance: n/a Referee: Ahmet Bagatır

4 October 1970 3	Galatasaray SK	2–0	Altay SK	Istanbul
15:15 EET	Cengiz Erkazan 61'; Ahmet Akkuş 85'	(Report)		Stadium: Ali Sami Yen Stadi; Attendance: n/a Referee: Ziya Türkdoğan

11 October 1970 4	Galatasaray SK	2–1	Istanbulspor	Istanbul
13:30 EET	Ahmet Akkuş 27'; Uğur Köken 89'	(Report)	Bilge Tarhan 6'	Stadium: Ali Sami Yen Stadi; Attendance: n/a Referee: Ertuğrul Dilek

24 October 1970 5	Beşiktaş JK	1–1	Galatasaray SK	Istanbul
20:15 EET	Nihat Yayöz 87'	(Report)	Suphi Soylu 18'	Stadium: Mithatpaşa Stadi; Attendance: n/a Referee: Nejat Şener

1 November 1970 6	Ankara Demirspor	1–5	Galatasaray SK	Ankara
14:45 EET	Teoman Yamanlar 3'	(Report)	Gökmen Özdenak 14', 69', 78'; Uğur Köken 23'; Ergün Acuner 35'	Stadium: 19 Mayıs Stadı; Referee: Ertuğrul Dilek

8 November 1970 7	Galatasaray SK	0–0	Karşıyaka SK	Istanbul
14:45 EET		(Report)		Stadium: Ali Sami Yen Stadi; Attendance: n/a Referee: Sabahattin Ladikli

15 November 1970 8	Mersin İdmanyurdu	2–0	Galatasaray SK	Mersin
14:30 EET	Muharrem Algıç 65'; Osman Arpacıoğlu 69'	(Report)		Stadium: Tevfik Sırrı Gür Stadı; Referee: Fehmi Pazarcı

21 November 1970 9	Galatasaray SK	0–0	Eskişehirspor	Istanbul
14:45 EET		(Report)		Stadium: Ali Sami Yen Stadi; Attendance: n/a Referee: Ziya Türkdoğan

29 November 1970 10	Galatasaray SK	1–1	Fenerbahçe SK	Istanbul
14:15 EET	Olcay Başarır 55'	(Report)	Mircea Sasu 10'	Stadium: Ali Sami Yen Stadi; Attendance: 31,611; Referee: Doğan Babacan

6 December 1970 11	Göztepe SK	1–1	Galatasaray SK	İzmir
14:30 EET	Ertan Öznur 48'	(Report)	Olcay Başarır 75'	Stadium: Alsancak Stadium; Referee: Veli Necdet Arığ

20 December 1970 12	MKE Ankaragücü	0–1	Galatasaray SK	Ankara
14:00 EET		(Report)	Metin Kurt 58'	Stadium: 19 Mayıs Stadı; Referee: Muzaffer Sarvan

26 December 1970 13	Galatasaray SK	1–0	Samsunspor	Istanbul
14:00 EET	Olcay Başarır 77'	(Report)		Stadium: Ali Sami Yen Stadi; Attendance: 15,273; Referee: Nihat Özbirgül

3 January 1971 14	Boluspor	1–2	Galatasaray	Bolu
14:00 EET	Çetiner Erdoğan 57'	(Report)	Metin Kurt 17', 40'	Stadium: Bolu Atatürk Stadium; Referee: Veli Necdet Arığ

9 January 1971 15	Galatasaray SK	7–1	PTT SK	Istanbul
14:00 EET	Metin Kurt 71'; Ergün Acuner 23', 25', 36'; Aydın Güleş 41'; Olcay Başarır 83'; Gökmen Özdenak 86'	(Report)	Enver Ürekli 52'	Stadium: Ali Sami Yen Stadi; Attendance: n/a Referee: Yavuz Tunç

14 February 1971 16	Galatasaray SK	2–0	Bursaspor	Istanbul
14:30 EET	Metin Kurt 37'; Ekrem Günalp 49'	(Report)		Stadium: Ali Sami Yen Stadi; Attendance: 35,957; Referee: Ziya Türkdoğan

21 February 1971 17	Vefa SK	0–2	Galatasaray SK	Istanbul
14:30 EET		(Report)	Gökmen Özdenak 9'; Ergün Acuner 45'	Stadium: Ali Sami Yen Stadi; Referee: Doğan Babacan

28 February 1971 18	Altay SK	0–1	Galatasaray SK	İzmir
14:45 EET		(Report)	Gökmen Özdenak 7'	Stadium: Alsancak Stadium; Referee: Veli Necdet Arığ

6 March 1971 19	Istanbulspor	3–0	Galatasaray SK	Istanbul
14:45 EET	Bilge Tarhan 37'; Ahmet Altuntaş 83'; Alpaslan Eratlı 90'	(Report)		Stadium: Ali Sami Yen Stadi; Referee: Ömer Karadağ

14 March 1971 20	Galatasaray SK	1–1	Beşiktaş JK	Istanbul
14:45 EET	Mehmet Oğuz 7'	(Report)	Güvenç Kurtar 78'	Stadium: Ali Sami Yen Stadi; Attendance: n/a Referee: Ertuğrul Dilek

20 March 1971 21	Galatasaray SK	1–0	Ankara Demirspor	Istanbul
14:45 EET	Metin Kurt 10'	(Report)		Stadium: Ali Sami Yen Stadi; Attendance: 12,201; Referee: İbrahim Fırla

28 March 1971 22	Karşıyaka SK	0–0	Galatasaray SK	İzmir
15:00 EET		(Report)		Stadium: Alsancak Stadium; Referee: Macit Sarıdana

4 April 1971 23	Galatasaray SK	2–0	Mersin İdmanyurdu	Istanbul
15:00 EET	Mehmet Oğuz 17'; Aydın Güleş 51'	(Report)		Stadium: Ali Sami Yen Stadi; Attendance: n/a Referee: Orhan Gönül

11 April 1971 24	Eskişehirspor	0–3	Galatasaray SK	Eskişehir
15:00 EET		(Report)	Tuncay Temeller 47' (pen.) 0-3 awarded game	Stadium: Atatürk Stadı); Referee: Nejat Şener

2 May 1971 25	Fenerbahçe SK	2–1	Galatasaray SK	Istanbul
15:30 EET	Yılmaz Şen 54'; Ogün Altıparmak 72'	(Report)	Metin Kurt 49'	Stadium: Mithatpaşa Stadi; Attendance: n/a Referee: Doğan Babacan

9 May 1971 26	Galatasaray SK	3–0	Göztepe SK	Istanbul
15:30 EET	Gökmen Özdenak 9', 87'; Metin Kurt 47'	(Report)		Stadium: Ali Sami Yen Stadi; Attendance: n/a Referee: Sabahattin Ladikli

15 May 1971 27	Galatasaray SK	0–1	MKE Ankaragücü	Istanbul
16:00 EET		(Report)	Selçuk Yalçıntaş 30'	Stadium: Ali Sami Yen Stadi; Attendance: n/a Referee: Muzaffer Sarvan

23 May 1971 28	Samsunspor	0–0	Galatasaray SK	Samsun
15:30 EET		(Report)		Stadium: Samsun City Stadium; Referee: Ziya Türkdoğan

30 May 1971 29	Galatasaray SK	3–0	Boluspor	Istanbul
16:00 EET	Ergün Acuner 60'; Ahmet Akkuş 62'; Gökmen Özdenak 85'	(Report)	n/a	Stadium: Mithatpaşa Stadi; Referee: Veli Necdet Arığ

8 June 1971 30	PTT SK	1–7	Galatasaray SK	Ankara
16:45 EET	Haydar Tuncer 88'	(Report)	Metin Kurt 12', 84'; Ahmet Akkuş 14', 15', 29'; Ergün Acuner 22'; Mehmet Oğuz 27'	Stadium: 19 Mayıs Stadı; Referee: Fehmi Pazarcı

== Türkiye Kupası ==
Kick-off listed in local time (EET)

=== 2nd round ===
17 January 1971 1	Sivas Demirspor (A)	0–4	Galatasaray SK	Sivas
13:30 EET		(Report)	Ergün Acuner 37', 86'; Metin Kurt 43'; Gökmen Özdenak 69'	Stadium: 4 Eylül Stadı; Referee: Mazhar Kerestecioğlu

23 January 1971 2	Galatasaray SK	4–1	Sivas Demirspor (A)	Istanbul
14:00 EET	Gökmen Özdenak 6', 44'; Metin Kurt 47'; Suphi Soylu 89'	(Report)	Sedat 90'	Stadium: Ali Sami Yen Stadı; Attendance: 11,916; Referee: İlhan Özkan

=== 1/4 Final ===
24 February 1971 1	Eskişehirspor	1–0	Galatasaray SK	Eskişehir
14:30 EET	Fethi Heper 22'	(Report)		Stadium: Atatürk Stadı); Referee: Nevzat Tansuk

10 March 1971 2	Galatasaray SK	0–0	Eskişehirspor	Istanbul
14:30 EET		(Report)		Stadium: Ali Sami Yen Stadi; Attendance: 16,542; Referee: Sabahattin Ladikli

== Süper Kupa ==
Kick-off listed in local time (EET)

30 June 1971	Galatasaray SK	2–3	Eskişehirspor	Ankara
20:00 EET	Metin Kurt 4'; Gökmen Özdenak 87'	(Report)	Fethi Heper 51', 89'; Ender Konca 64'	Stadium: 19 Mayıs Stadı; Referee: Doğan Babacan

== Friendly matches ==
16 August 1970	Galatasaray SK	1–1	Fenerbahçe SK	Istanbul
20:30 EET	Suphi Soylu 46'	(Report)	Fuat Saner 29'	Stadium: Ali Sami Yen Stadi; Attendance: 30,910; Referee: Doğan Babacan

=== TSYD Kupası ===
23 August 1970 1	Beşiktaş JK	1–1	Galatasaray SK	Istanbul
17:00 EET	Güvenç Kurtar 82'	(Report)	Gökmen Özdenak 42'	Stadium: Ali Sami Yen Stadi; Attendance: n/a Referee: Sedat Özselçuk

26 August 1970 2	Galatasaray SK	3–0	Fenerbahçe SK	Istanbul
20:00 EET	Suphi Soylu 42'; Savaş Yarbay 54'; Metin Kurt 60'	(Report)		Stadium: Ali Sami Yen Stadi; Attendance: n/a Referee: Ömer Karadağ

== Attendance ==
Competition	Av. Att.	Total Att.
1. Lig	23,761	95,042
Türkiye Kupası	14,229	28,458
Total	20,583	123,500
