= 1972–73 Galatasaray S.K. season =

Galatasaray
1972–73 season
- President: Selahattin Beyazıt (until 3 February 1973); Mustafa Pekin
- Manager: Brian Birch
- Stadium: Ali Sami Yen Stadi; Mithatpaşa Stadi
- 1.Lig: 1st
- Türkiye Kupası: Winner
- Süper Kupa: Runner-up
- Top goalscorer: League: Mehmet Özgül (12); All: Mehmet Özgül (15)
- Highest home attendance: 42,850 vs FC Bayern Munich (13 September 1972)
- Lowest home attendance: 17,830 vs Vefa SK (04 April 1973)
- Average home league attendance: 32,178
Home colours	Away colours	Third colours

The 1972–73 season was Galatasaray's 69th in existence and the 15th consecutive season in the 1. Lig. This article shows statistics of the club's players in the season, and also lists all matches that the club have played in the season.

== Squad statistics ==
No.	Pos.	Name	1. Lig		Türkiye Kupası		Süper Kupa		European Cup		Total	
No.	Pos.	Name	Apps	Goals	Apps	Goals	Apps	Goals	Apps	Goals	Apps	Goals
1	GK	(Turkey) Yasin Özdenak	26	0	10	0	1	0	2	0	39	0
-	GK	(Turkey) Nihat Akbay	4	0	0	0	0	0	1	0	5	0
-	DF	(Turkey) Tarık Küpoğlu	23	0	8	0	0	0	2	0	33	0
-	DF	(Turkey) Muzaffer Sipahi	28	0	10	1	1	0	2	0	41	1
-	DF	(Turkey) Arif Kuşdoğan	1	0	0	0	0	0	0	0	1	0
-	DF	(Turkey) Tuncay Temeller	20	8	8	1	1	0	2	0	31	9
-	DF	(Turkey) Ekrem Günalp	29	1	9	0	1	0	2	0	41	1
-	DF	(Turkey) Samim Yağız	0	0	1	0	0	0	0	0	1	0
-	MF	(Turkey) Aydın Güleş	29	2	9	0	1	0	1	0	40	2
-	MF	(Turkey) Bülent Ünder	26	2	8	0	1	0	2	1	37	3
-	MF	(Turkey) Ahmet Akkuş	23	6	8	1	0	0	0	0	31	7
-	MF	(Turkey) Mehmet Oğuz	28	2	10	3	1	0	2	0	41	5
-	MF	(Turkey) Talat Özkarslı	0	0	0	0	0	0	0	0	0	0
-	MF	(Turkey) Savaş Yarbay	3	0	1	0	0	0	0	0	4	0
-	FW	(Turkey) Suphi Soylu	1	0	1	0	0	0	0	0	2	0
-	FW	(Turkey) Uğur Köken(C)	12	1	1	0	0	0	2	0	15	1
-	FW	(Turkey) Avram Kalpin	0	0	0	0	0	0	0	0	0	0
-	FW	(Turkey) Metin Kurt	30	9	10	4	1	1	2	0	43	14
9	FW	(Turkey) Gökmen Özdenak	20	2	7	5	0	0	2	0	29	7
-	FW	(Turkey) Olcay Başarır	13	1	3	0	1	0	1	0	18	1
-	FW	(Turkey) Korhan Tınaz	11	1	6	3	1	0	0	0	18	4
-	MF	(Turkey) Mehmet Özgül	26	12	8	3	1	0	1	0	36	15

=== Players in / out ===
==== In ====
Pos.	Nat.	Name	Age	Moving from
FW	(Turkey)	Mehmet Özgül	22	Sirkeci SK
FW	(Turkey)	Korhan Tınaz	19	Kütahyaspor
DF	(Turkey)	Arif Kuşdoğan	16	Galatasaray U21

==== Out ====
Pos.	Nat.	Name	Age	Moving to
FW	(Turkey)	Ayhan Elmastaşoğlu	33	Sakaryaspor

== 1.Lig ==
=== Standings ===
Pos	Team	Pld	W	D	L	GF	GA	GD	Pts	Qualification or relegation
1	Galatasaray (C)	30	19	9	2	47	12	+35	47	Qualification to European Cup first round
2	Fenerbahçe	30	16	10	4	42	17	+25	42	Qualification to UEFA Cup first round
3	Eskişehirspor	30	12	12	6	31	19	+12	36	Qualification to UEFA Cup first round
4	MKE Ankaragücü	30	12	10	8	24	21	+3	34	Qualification to Cup Winners' Cup first round
5	Boluspor	30	12	9	9	37	30	+7	33	Invitation to Balkans Cup

Rules for classification: 1) points; 2) goal difference; 3) number of goals scored.
(C) Champions

=== Matches ===
9 September 1972 1	Galatasaray SK	3–0	PTT SK	Istanbul
16:30 EET	Gökmen Özdenak 36', 86'; Uğur Köken 83'	(Report)		Stadium: Mithatpaşa Stadi; Attendance: 19,951; Referee: İbrahim Fırla

16 September 1972 2	Şekerspor	0–0	Galatasaray SK	Ankara
15:45 EET		(Report)		Stadium: Ankara 19 Mayıs Stadı; Attendance: 14,020; Referee: Yavuz Tunç

24 September 1972 3	Galatasaray SK	2–0	Mersin İdmanyurdu	Istanbul
15:45 EET	Mehmet Özgül 12'; Metin Kurt 43'	(Report)		Stadium: Ali Sami Yen Stadi; Attendance: 28,306; Referee: Muzaffer Sarvan

1 October 1972 4	Galatasaray SK	0–0	Beşiktaş JK	Istanbul
15:30 EET		(Report)		Stadium: Mithatpaşa Stadi; Attendance: 38,868; Referee: Ertuğrul Dilek

8 October 1972 5	Altay SK	0–2	Galatasaray	İzmir
15:45 EET		(Report)	Mehmet Özgül 7'; Olcay Başarır 13'	Stadium: İzmir Atatürk Stadium; Referee: Macit Sarıdana

14 October 1972 6	Galatasaray SK	0–1	Göztepe SK	Istanbul
14:15 EET		(Report)	Mehmet Türken 85'	Stadium: Mithatpaşa Stadi; Attendance: 26,040; Referee: Sabahattin Ladikli

29 October 1972 7	Giresunspor	1–1	Galatasaray SK	Giresun
14:00 EET	Doğan Tepeçalı 73'	(Report)	Mehmet Özgül 86'	Stadium: Atatürk Stadi; Referee: Macit Sarıdana

4 November 1972 8	Vefa SK	1–2	Galatasaray SK	Istanbul
14:30 EET	Ünal Tombulel 79'	(Report)	Tuncay Temeller 41' (pen.), 66'	Stadium: Mithatpaşa Stadi; Attendance: 15,573; Referee: Ertuğrul Dilek

12 November 1972 9	Galatasaray	1–0	Adanaspor	Istanbul
14:30 EET	Metin Kurt 85'	(Report)		Stadium: Mithatpaşa Stadi; Attendance: 29,246; Referee: Muzaffer Sarvan

19 November 1972 10	Boluspor	0–0	Galatasaray	Bolu
14:30 EET		(Report)		Stadium: Bolu Atatürk Stadium; Referee: Fehmi Pazarcı

25 November 1972 11	Galatasaray SK	3–1	Eskişehirspor	Istanbul
14:30 EET	Aydın Güleş 35'; Metin Kurt 55'; Ahmet Akkuş 85'	(Report)	Şevki Şenlen 89'	Stadium: Mithatpaşa Stadi; Attendance: 42,337; Referee: Muzaffer Sarvan

3 December 1972 12	Fenerbahçe SK	1–1	Galatasaray SK	Istanbul
14:15 EET	Osman Arpacıoğlu 65'	(Report)	Ahmet Akkuş 43'	Stadium: Mithatpaşa Stadi; Attendance: 41,293; Referee: Doğan Babacan

17 December 1972 13	MKE Ankaragücü	0–0	Galatasaray SK	Ankara
14:00 EET		(Report)		Stadium: 19 Mayıs Stadı; Attendance: 40,000; Referee: Fehmi Pazarcı

24 December 1972 14	Galatasaray SK	5–0	Samsunspor	Istanbul
14:15 EET	Metin Kurt 10', 45', 59'; Ahmet Akkuş 17', 85'	(Report)		Stadium: Mithatpaşa Stadi; Attendance: 27,971; Referee: İbrahim Fırla

31 December 1972 15	Bursaspor	0–1	Galatasaray SK	Bursa
14:15 EET		(Report)	Aydın Güleş 65'	Stadium: Atatürk Stadı; Referee: Muzaffer Sarvan

4 February 1973 16	PTT SK	1–1	Galatasaray SK	Ankara
14:15 EET	Erol Erhanlı 27'	(Report)	Bülent Ünder 6'	Stadium: 19 Mayıs Stadı; Attendance: 24,280; Referee: Orhan Cebe

10 February 1973 17	Galatasaray SK	1–0	Şekerspor	Istanbul
14:30EET	Mehmet Özgül 5'	(Report)		Stadium: Mithatpaşa Stadi; Attendance: 30,262; Referee: İbrahim Fırla

18 February 1973 18	Mersin İdmanyurdu	0–0	Galatasaray SK	Mersin
14:00 EET		(Report)		Stadium: Tevfik Sırrı Gür Stadı; Referee: Ziya Türkdoğan

4 March 1973 19	Beşiktaş JK	0–3	Galatasaray SK	Istanbul
14:45 EET		(Report)	Tuncay Temeller 22' (pen.); Ahmet Akkuş 52'; Mehmet Özgül 58'	Stadium: Mithatpaşa Stadi; Attendance: 42,863; Referee: Sedat Özselçuk

11 March 1973 20	Galatasaray SK	1–0	Altay SK	Istanbul
14:45 EET	Metin Kurt 21'	(Report)		Stadium: Mithatpaşa Stadi; Attendance: n/a Referee: Nevzat Tansuk

18 March 1973 21	Göztepe SK	0–4	Galatasaray SK	İzmir
15:00 EET		(Report)	Tuncay Temeller 37'; Mehmet Özgül 51', 58'; Ahmet Akkuş 56'	Stadium: İzmir Atatürk Stadium; Attendance: 39,290; Referee: Ziya Türkdoğan

24 March 1973 22	Galatasaray SK	2–0	Giresunspor	Istanbul
15:00 EET	Tuncay Temelle 9'; Korhan Tınaz 64'	(Report)		Stadium: Mithatpaşa Stadi; Attendance: 39,666; Referee: Macit Sarıdana

31 March 1973 23	Galatasaray SK	3–1	Vefa SK	Istanbul
15:00 EET	Mehmet Özgül 53', 76'; Mehmet Oğuz 82'	(Report)	Jorge Montemarani 26'	Stadium: Mithatpaşa Stadi; Attendance: 37,858; Referee: Ömer Karadağ

8 April 1973 24	Adanaspor	0–1	Galatasaray SK	Adana
14:30 EET		(Report)	Mehmet Oğuz 24'	Stadium: Adana 5 Ocak Stadı; Referee: Fehmi Pazarcı

15 April 1973 25	Galatasaray SK	3–1	Boluspor	Istanbul
15:30 EET	Metin Kurt 5'; Bülent Ünder 10'; Tuncay Temeller 17'	(Report)	Sinan Alayoğlu 12'	Stadium: Mithatpaşa Stadi; Attendance: 42,510; Referee: Macit Sarıdana

22 April 1973 26	Eskişehirspor	2–0	Galatasaray SK	Eskişehir
14:45 EET	Burhan İpek 80', 81'	(Report)		Stadium: Eskişehir Atatürk Stadı; Referee: Nihat Özbirgül

29 April 1973 27	Galatasaray SK	1–0	Fenerbahçe SK	Istanbul
15:45 EET	Tuncay Temeller 28'	(Report)		Stadium: Mithatpaşa Stadi; Attendance: 30,589; Referee: Ertuğrul Dilek

12 May 1973 28	Galatasaray SK	3–0	MKE Ankaragücü	Istanbul
16:30 EET	Ekrem Günalp 35'; Metin Kurt 44'; Mehmet Özgül 60'	(Report)		Stadium: Inönü Stadi; Attendance: n/a Referee: İbrahim Fırla

20 May 1973 29	Samsunspor	1–1	Galatasaray SK	Samsun
15:15 EET	Adem Kurukaya 19'	(Report)	Tuncay Temeller 26'	Stadium: Samsun 19 Mayıs Stadı; Referee: Ertuğrul Aybay

27 May 1973 30	Galatasaray SK	2–1	Bursaspor	Istanbul
16:30 EET	Mehmet Özgül 25', 90'	(Report)	Tuncay Temeller 54' (pen.)	Stadium: Mithatpaşa Stadi; Attendance: 24,707; Referee: Muzaffer Sarvan

== Türkiye Kupası ==
Kick-off listed in local time (EET)

=== 1st round ===
1 November 1972 1	Galatasaray SK	5–1	Orduspor (2)	Istanbul
14:30 EET	Tuncay Temeller 15' (pen.); Korhan Tınaz 42', 48', 78'; Mehmet Oğuz 69'	(Report)	Güven Türközer 90'	Stadium: Mithatpaşa Stadi; Attendance: n/a Referee: Müşfik Talas

15 November 1972 2	Orduspor (2)	1–2	Galatasaray SK	Ordu
14:00 EET	Aydın Yıldırım 38'	(Report)	Gökmen Özdenak 18'; Metin Kurt 70'	Stadium: Ordu 19 Eylül Stadium; Referee: Ata Bahri

=== 2nd round ===
13 December 1972 1	Eskişehirspor	0–0	Galatasaray SK	Eskişehir
14:00 EET		(Report)		Stadium: Eskişehir Atatürk Stadı; Referee: Sabahattin Ladikli

27 December 1972 2	Galatasaray SK	3–0	Eskişehirspor	Istanbul
14:00EET	Metin Kurt 62'; Gökmen Özdenak 79'; Mehmet Oğuz 86' (pen.)	(Report)		Stadium: Mithatpaşa Stadi; Attendance: 19,474; Referee: Macit Sarıdana

=== 1/4 final ===
28 January 1973 1	Galatasaray SK	4–1	Bursaspor	Istanbul
14:30 EET	Metin Kurt 2'; Ahmet Akkuş 15'; Muzaffer Sipahi 31'; Mehmet Özgül 83'	(Report)	Sinan Bür 75'	Stadium: Mithatpaşa Stadi; Attendance: 30,639; Referee: Sabahattin Ladikli

28 February 1973 2	Bursaspor	1–1	Galatasaray SK	Bursa
14:45 EET	Mesut Şen 21'	(Report)	Gökmen Özdenak 72'	Stadium: Atatürk Stadı; Referee: Macit Sarıdana

=== 1/2 final ===
14 March 1973 1	Vefa SK	1–2	Galatasaray SK	Istanbul
14:45 EET	Erdinç Sandalcı 34'	(Report)	Mehmet Özgül 13', 32'	Stadium: Mithatpaşa Stadi; Attendance: 12,722; Referee: Cumhur Demir

4 April 1973 2	Galatasaray SK	0–0	Vefa SK	Istanbul
18:00 EET		(Report)		Stadium: Mithatpaşa Stadi; Attendance: 17,830; Referee: Doğan Babacan

=== Final ===
2 May 1973 1	Galatasaray SK	3–1	MKE Ankaragücü	Istanbul
16:30 EET	Gökmen Özdenak 36', 72'; Mehmet Oğuz 89'	(Report)	Metin Yılmaz 17'	Stadium: Inönü Stadi; Attendance: 20,824; Referee: Sedat Özselçuk

23 May 1973 2	MKE Ankaragücü	1–1	Galatasaray SK	Ankara
16:30 EET	Erman Toroğlu 73'	(Report)	Metin Kurt 70'	Stadium: 19 Mayıs Stadı; Attendance: 21,612; Referee: Ziya Türkdoğan

== Süper Kupa ==
Kick-off listed in local time (EET)

9 June 1973	Galatasaray SK	1–2	Fenerbahçe SK	Ankara
15:00 EET	Metin Kurt 5'	(Report)	Cemil Turan 19'; Fuat Saner 45' (pen.)	Stadium: 19 Mayıs Stadı; Attendance: 25,000; Referee: Doğan Babacan

== European Cup ==
=== 1st round ===
13 September 1972 1	Galatasaray SK	1–1	FC Bayern Munich	Istanbul
EET	Bülent Ünder 55'	(Report)	Gerd Müller 66'	Stadium: Mithatpaşa Stadi; Attendance: 42,850; Referee: (Italy) Aurelio Angonese

27 September 1972 2	FC Bayern Munich	6–0	Galatasaray SK	München
01:00 EET	Gerd Müller 14', 78'; Uli Hoeness 29'; Edgar Schneider 35'; Franz Beckenbauer 76' (pen.); Franz Roth 88'	(Report)		Stadium: Olympiastadion; Attendance: 70,000; Referee: (Portugal) Fernando Leite

== Friendly matches ==
12 August 1972 1	Galatasaray SK	0–0	Beşiktaş JK	Istanbul
15:00 EET		(Report)		Stadium: Ali Sami Yen Stadi; Attendance: 14,742; Referee: Sermet Kaftancı

=== TSYD Kupası ===
16 August 1972 1	Fenerbahçe SK	0–0	Galatasaray SK	Istanbul
20:30 EET		(Report)		Stadium: Ali Sami Yen Stadi; Attendance: 26,381; Referee: Sermet Kaftancı

23 August 1972 1	Galatasaray SK	0–0	Beşiktaş JK	Istanbul
20:30 EET		(Report)		Stadium: Ali Sami Yen Stadi; Attendance: n/a Referee: Kemal Akay

==== Zafer Bayramı Kupası ====
30 August 1972	Galatasaray SK	0–1	Fenerbahçe SK	Istanbul
15:00 EET		(Report)	Osman Arpacıoğlu 6'	Stadium: Ali Sami Yen Stadi; Attendance: n/a Referee: Cumhur Demir

==== Hasan Tahsin Kupası ====
21 January 1973	Fenerbahçe SK	2–1	Galatasaray SK	İzmir
15:00 EET	Canan Açıkgöz 2' (pen.); Muharrem Algıç 20'	(Report)	Gökmen Özdenak 8'	Stadium: Atatürk Stadı; Attendance: 66,701; Referee: Muzaffer Sarvan

== Attendance ==
Competition	Av. Att.	Total Att.
1. Lig	32,178	418,311
Türkiye Kupası	22,192	88,767
European Cup	42,850	42,850
Total	30,552	549,928
