= 1961–62 Galatasaray S.K. season =

Galatasaray
1961–62 season
- President: (Turkey) Refik Selimoğlu (until 27 January 1962) (Turkey) Ulvi Yenal
- Manager: (Turkey) Gündüz Kılıç
- Stadium: Mithatpaşa Stadi
- Milli Lig: 1st
- Top goalscorer: League: Bahri Altıntabak (12); All: Bahri Altıntabak (12)
- Highest home attendance: 26,516 vs Fenerbahçe SK (Milli Lig, 1 January 1962)
- Lowest home attendance: 6,226 vs Göztepe SK (Milli Lig, 10 June 1962)
- Average home league attendance: 13,137
Home colours	Away colours

The 1961–62 season was Galatasaray's 58th in existence and the 4th consecutive season in the 1. Lig. This article shows statistics of the club's players in the season, and also lists all matches that the club have played in the season.

== Squad statistics ==
No.	Pos.	Name	Milli Lig		Total	
No.	Pos.	Name	Apps	Goals	Apps	Goals
-	GK	(Turkey) Turgay Şeren(C)	36	0	36	0
-	GK	(Turkey) Bülent Gürbüz	2	0	2	0
-	DF	(Turkey) Candemir Berkman	37	1	37	1
-	DF	(Turkey) Ahmet Karlıklı	35	0	35	0
-	MF	(Turkey) Suat Mamat	26	5	26	5
-	MF	(Turkey) Bahri Altıntabak	34	12	34	12
-	MF	(Turkey) Talat Özkarslı	33	8	33	8
-	MF	(Turkey) Erol Boralı	1	0	1	0
-	DF	(Turkey) Ergun Ercins	36	0	36	0
-	MF	(Turkey) Erol Kaynak	2	0	2	0
-	FW	(Turkey) Ahmet Berman	38	2	38	2
-	FW	(Turkey) Ayhan Elmastaşoğlu	18	6	18	6
-	FW	(Turkey) Uğur Köken	37	6	37	6
-	FW	(Turkey) Selçuk Hergül	11	3	11	3
-	FW	(Turkey) İlhan Geliş	6	0	6	0
-	FW	(Turkey) Niyazi Tamakan	9	2	9	2
-	FW	(Turkey) Mete Basmacı	25	3	25	3
-	FW	(Turkey) Recep Adanır	24	4	24	4
-	FW	(Turkey) Samim Uygun	8	0	8	0

=== Players in / out ===
==== In ====
Pos.	Nat.	Name	Age	Moving from
MF	(Turkey)	Talat Özkarslı	33	Göztepe SK

==== Out ====
Pos.	Nat.	Name	Age	Moving to
FW	(Turkey)	Metin Oktay	25	U.S. Città di Palermo

== Milli Lig ==
=== Standings ===
Pos	Team	Pld	W	D	L	GF	GA	GR	Pts	Qualification
1	Galatasaray (C)	38	23	11	4	52	18	2.889	57	Qualification to European Cup preliminary round
2	Fenerbahçe	38	23	7	8	64	30	2.133	53	Invitation to Balkans Cup
3	Beşiktaş	38	16	16	6	48	24	2.000	48	Invitation to Balkans Cup
4	Altay	38	18	10	10	44	35	1.257	46	Invitation to Inter-Cities Fairs Cup first round
5	Karşıyaka	38	17	8	13	46	51	0.902	42	

(C) Champions

=== Matches ===
Kick-off listed in local time (EET)

2 September 1961 1	Şekerhilâl SK	0–1	Galatasaray SK	Ankara
16:30 EET		(Report)	Talat Özkarslı 80'	Stadium: 19 Mayıs Stadı; Attendance: 11,194; Referee: Feyyaz Turgul

3 September 1961 2	MKE Ankaragücü	0–2	Galatasaray SK	Ankara
16:30 EET		(Report)	Talat Özkarslı 16'; Selçuk Hergül 43'	Stadium: 19 Mayıs Stadı; Attendance: 19,318; Referee: Hakkı Gürüz

9 September 1961 3	Galatasaray SK	4–1	Gençlerbirliği SK	Istanbul
16:30 EET	Selçuk Hergül 14'; Bahri Altıntabak 21', 35', 52'	(Report)	Özkan Gürgün 67'	Stadium: Mithatpaşa Stadi; Attendance: 14,219; Referee: Orhan Gönül

10 September 1961 4	Galatasaray SK	2–0	Ankara Demirspor	Istanbul
16:30 EET	Bahri Altıntabak 77'; Ahmet Berman 81'	(Report)		Stadium: Mithatpaşa Stadi; Attendance: 9,517; Referee: Tahir Arcan

16 September 1961 5	Göztepe SK	1–1	Galatasaray SK	İzmir
16:15 EET	Abdürrahim Erdölek 11'	(Report)	Ahmet Berman 44'	Stadium: Alsancak Stadı; Attendance: 6,518; Referee: Hüseyin Maloğlu

17 September 1961 6	İzmirspor	1–1	Galatasaray SK	İzmir
16:15 EET	Gürcan Berk 83'	(Report)	Niyazi Tamakan 58'	Stadium: Alsancak Stadium; Attendance: 11,076; Referee: Ali Timur

30 September 1961 7	Galatasaray SK	1–2	Karşıyaka SK	Istanbul
15:15 EET	Niyazi Tamakan 7'	(Report)	Mustafa Aksoy 14'; Sabahattin Haskan 31'	Stadium: Mithatpaşa Stadi; Attendance: 17,771; Referee: Cezmi Başar

1 October 1961 8	Galatasaray SK	2–1	Altay SK	Istanbul
15:30 EET	Recep Adanır 43'; Mete Basmacı 64'	(Report)	Nail Elmastaşoğlu 6'	Stadium: Mithatpaşa Stadi; Attendance: 17,830; Referee: Hüseyin Maloğlu

14 October 1961 9	Galatasaray SK	1–0	İstanbulspor	Istanbul
15:30 EET	Ayhan Elmastaşoğlu 68'	(Report)		Stadium: Mithatpaşa Stadi; Attendance: 9,057; Referee: Sedat Özselçuk

21 October 1961 10	Galatasaray SK	2–0	PTT SK	Istanbul
15:00 EET	Mete Basmacı 59'; Suat Mamat 73'	(Report)		Stadium: Mithatpaşa Stadi; Attendance: 11,005; Referee: Baha Kırçıl

22 October 1961 11	Galatasaray SK	2–0	Altınordu SK	Istanbul
15:00 EET	Mete Basmacı 2'; Selçuk Hergül 78'	(Report)		Stadium: Mithatpaşa Stadi; Attendance: 12,068; Referee: Hüseyin Maloğlu

19 November 1961 12	Galatasaray SK	2–1	Kasımpaşa SK	Istanbul
14:15 EET	Talat Özkarslı 4', 29'	(Report)	Yılmaz Öztürk 62'	Stadium: Mithatpaşa Stadi; Attendance: 12,808; Referee: Muvahhit Afir

25 November 1961 13	Galatasaray SK	2–0	Beykoz 1908 SKD	Istanbul
14:15 EET	Uğur Köken 86'; Talat Özkarslı 87'	(Report)		Stadium: Mithatpaşa Stadi; Attendance: 15,487; Referee: Cihat Ergün

10 December 1961 14	Galatasaray SK	0–0	Beşiktaş JK	Istanbul
14:00 EET		(Report)		Stadium: Mithatpaşa Stadi; Attendance: 23,243; Referee: Hakkı Gürüz

24 December 1961 15	Galatasaray SK	0–0	Yeşildirek SK	Istanbul
14:00 EET		(Report)		Stadium: Mithatpaşa Stadi; Attendance: 8,745; Referee: Rıfat Atakanı

1 January 1962 16	Galatasaray SK	1–0	Fenerbahçe SK	Istanbul
13:45 EET	Bahri Altıntabak 32'	(Report)		Stadium: Mithatpaşa Stadi; Attendance: 26,516; Referee: Faruk Talu

13 January 1962 17	Galatasaray SK	1–0	Vefa SK	Istanbul
14:30 EET	Suat Mamat 49'	(Report)		Stadium: Mithatpaşa Stadi; Attendance: 15,783; Referee: Faruk Talu

28 January 1962 18	Galatasaray SK	1–0	Feriköy SK	Istanbul
15:00 EET	Suat Mamat 55'	(Report)		Stadium: Mithatpaşa Stadi; Attendance: 10,714; Referee: Hüseyin Maloğlu

11 February 1962 19	Galatasaray SK	0–0	Fatih Karagümrük SK	Istanbul
15:00 EET		(Report)		Stadium: Mithatpaşa Stadi; Attendance: 8,642; Referee: Veli Necdet Arığ

24 February 1962 20	Ankara Demirspor	1–2	Galatasaray SK	Ankara
15:15 EET	Fikri Elma 69'	(Report)	Bahri Altıntabak 20', 53'	Stadium: 19 Mayıs Stadı; Attendance: 12,806; Referee: Kemal Yavman

25 February 1962 21	Gençlerbirliği SK	0–1	Galatasaray SK	Ankara
15:15 EET		(Report)	Uğur Köken 76'	Stadium: 19 Mayıs Stadı; Attendance: 15,763; Referee: Nejat Şener

8 March 1962 22	Kasımpaşa SK	0–0	Galatasaray SK	Istanbul
15:45 EET		(Report)		Stadium: Mithatpaşa Stadi; Referee: Nadi Irmaklar

9 March 1962 23	Beykoz 1908 SKD	0–3	Galatasaray SK	Istanbul
15:45 EET		(Report)	Suat Mamat 26'; Uğur Köken 44'; Bahri Altıntabak 48'	Stadium: Mithatpaşa Stadi; Referee: Cihat Ergün

17 March 1962 24	Altınordu SK	1–5	Galatasaray SK	İzmir
16:00 EET	Bülent Esel 78'	(Report)	Bahri Altıntabak 5', 37'; Uğur Köken 46'; Recep Adanır 52', 73'	Stadium: Alsancak Stadium; Attendance: 7,907; Referee: Mustafa Gerçeker

19 March 1962 25	Altay SK	0–0	Galatasaray SK	İzmir
15:45 EET		(Report)		Stadium: Alsancak Stadium; Attendance: 9,715; Referee: Mustafa Gerçeker

1 April 1962 26	PTT SK	0–0	Galatasaray SK	Ankara
16:00 EET		(Report)		Stadium: 19 Mayıs Stadı; Attendance: 19,227; Referee: Orhan Gönül

5 April 1962 27	Vefa SK	1–1	Galatasaray SK	Istanbul
20:00 EET	Yavuz Kirmanoğlu 5'	(Report)	Uğur Köken 10'	Stadium: Mithatpaşa Stadi; Attendance: 5,378; Referee: Cihat Ergün

8 April 1962 28	Karşıyaka SK	1–0	Galatasaray SK	İzmir
15:45 EET	Vural Olşen 63'	(Report)		Stadium: Alsancak Stadium; Attendance: 9,745; Referee: Zülbahar Sağnak

18 April 1962 29	Yeşildirek SK	0–2	Galatasaray SK	Istanbul
20:00 EET		(Report)	Recep Adanır 38'; Ayhan Elmastaşoğlu 59'	Stadium: Mithatpaşa Stadi; Attendance: 7,322; Referee: Ahmet Bagatır

5 May 1962 30	Galatasaray SK	1–0	MKE Ankaragücü SK	Istanbul
16:30 EET	Bahri Altıntabak 1'	(Report)		Stadium: Mithatpaşa Stadi; Attendance: 11,217; Referee: Nejat Şener

6 May 1962 31	Galatasaray SK	2–0	Şekerhilâl SK	Istanbul
16:30 EET	Talat Özkarslı 63'; Ayhan Elmastaşoğlu 81'	(Report)		Stadium: Mithatpaşa Stadi; Attendance: 7,753; Referee: Zeki Abarşal

9 May 1962 32	Feriköy SK	0–0	Galatasaray SK	Istanbul
20:00 EET		(Report)		Stadium: Mithatpaşa Stadi; Attendance: 4,316; Referee: Cihat Ergün

24 May 1962 33	Fenerbahçe SK	1–0	Galatasaray SK	Istanbul
20:00 EET	Selim Soydan 75'	(Report)		Stadium: Mithatpaşa Stadi; Attendance: 27,542; Referee: Cezmi Başar

27 May 1962 34	Galatasaray SK	1–0	İzmirspor	Istanbul
16:45 EET	Suat Mamat 44'	(Report)		Stadium: Mithatpaşa Stadi; Attendance: 11,010; Referee: Abdi Parlakay

31 May 1962 35	Fatih Karagümrük SK	2–3	Galatasaray SK	Istanbul
20:30 EET	Tarık Kutver 21', 77'	(Report)	Talat Özkarslı 16'; Candemir Berkman 26'; Ayhan Elmastaşoğlu 79'	Stadium: Mithatpaşa Stadi; Attendance: 8,861; Referee: Hüseyin Maloğlu

7 June 1962 36	Beşiktaş JK	1–1	Galatasaray SK	Istanbul
20:15 EET	Güven Önüt 37'	(Report)	Bahri Altıntabak 35'	Stadium: Mithatpaşa Stadi; Attendance: 20,202; Referee: Mustafa Gerçeker

10 June 1962 37	Galatasaray SK	0–2	Göztepe SK	Istanbul
20:15 EET		(Report)	Nevzat Güzelırmak 25'; Gürsel Aksel 32'	Stadium: Mithatpaşa Stadi; Attendance: 6,226; Referee: Veli Necdet Arığ

16 June 1962 38	Istanbulspor	1–4	Galatasaray SK	Istanbul
17:15 EET	İhsan Baydar 9'	(Report)	Ayhan Elmastaşoğlu 17', 80'; Uğur Köken 29'; Uğur Köken 88'	Stadium: Mithatpaşa Stadi; Attendance: 20,840; Referee: Muvahhit Afir

== Balkans Cup ==
=== Group A ===
Pos	Team	Pld	W	D	L	GF	GA	GR	Pts	Qualification
1	(Greece) Olympiacos (A)	4	2	1	1	9	11	0.818	5	Advances to finals
2	(Romania) Steagul Roșu Brașov	4	2	0	2	9	6	1.500	4	
3	(Socialist Federal Republic of Yugoslavia) Sarajevo	4	1	1	2	8	9	0.889	3	
4	(Turkey) Galatasaray (Note: Galatasaray retired from the competition having played two games against Olympiacos and their record was cancelled.)	0	0	0	0	0	0	—	0	

Source: rsssf.com
Rules for classification: 1) points; 2) goal average; 3) number of goals scored
(A) Advance to a further round
Notes:

11 April 1962 1	Olympiacos F.C.	1–0	Galatasaray SK	Piraeus
		(Report)

24 October 1962 2	Galatasaray SK	1–1	Olympiacos F.C.	Istanbul
		(Report)

== Friendly Matches ==
Kick-off listed in local time (EET)

=== Tournament ===
29 August 1961 1	Galatasaray SK	1–1	Beşiktaş JK	Istanbul
16:45 EET	Erol Kaynak 59'	[ (Report)]	Erdoğan Gökçen 69'	Stadium: Mithatpaşa Stadı; Attendance: 12,327; Referee: Semih Zoroğlu

30 August 1961 2	Fenerbahçe SK	2–0	Galatasaray SK	Istanbul
16:45 EET	Candemir Berkman 1' (o.g.); Lefter Küçükandonyadis 28'	[ (Report)]		Stadium: Mithatpaşa Stadı; Attendance: 12,759; Referee: Faruk Talu

=== Eski Muharip Kupası ===
20 September 1961 1	Fenerbahçe SK	1–1	Galatasaray SK	Ankara
20:30 EET	Can Bartu 59'	[ (Report)]	Bahri Altıntabak 67'	Stadium: 19 Mayıs Stadı; Attendance: 14,891; Referee: Zülbahar Sağnak

=== Doğuya Yardim Kampanyasi ===
7 February 1962 1	Galatasaray SK	3–2	Beşiktaş JK	Istanbul
15:00 EET	Suat Mamat 43'; Samim Uygun 49'; Ahmet Berman 86'	[ (Report)]	Şenol Birol 64', 66'	Stadium: Mithatpaşa Stadı; Attendance: 7,452; Referee: Semih Zoroğlu

14 February 1962 3	Fenerbahçe SK	3–2	Galatasaray SK	Istanbul
15:00 EET	Lefter Küçükandonyadis 19', 55'; Selim Soydan 70'	[ (Report)]	Talat Özkarslı 18', 44'	Stadium: Mithatpaşa Stadı; Attendance: 8,234; Referee: Müvahhit Afir

=== Friendly match in Ankara ===
21 June 1962 1	Beşiktaş JK	1–1	Galatasaray SK	Ankara
20:30 EET	Güven Önüt 14'	[ (Report)]	Talat Özkarslı 88'	Stadium: 19 Mayıs Stadı; Attendance: 10,000; Referee: Sabahattin Ladikli

== Attendances ==
Competition	Av. Att.	Total Att.
Milli Lig	13,137	249,611
Total	13,137	249,611
