= 1928–29 Beşiktaş J.K. season =

Beşiktaş J.K.
1928–29 season
- President: (Turkey) Fuat Balkan
- Manager: (Hungary) Imre Zinger
- Stadium: Taksim Stadium
- Istanbul Football League: 3rd
- Turkish Football Cup: Did not win

The 1928–29 season was the club's 8th official football season and the 25th year of the club's existence.

They finished third in the fifth year of the Istanbul Football League, behind the champion Galatasaray and runner-up Fenerbahçe.
