= Arif Peçenek =

Turkish footballer and manager

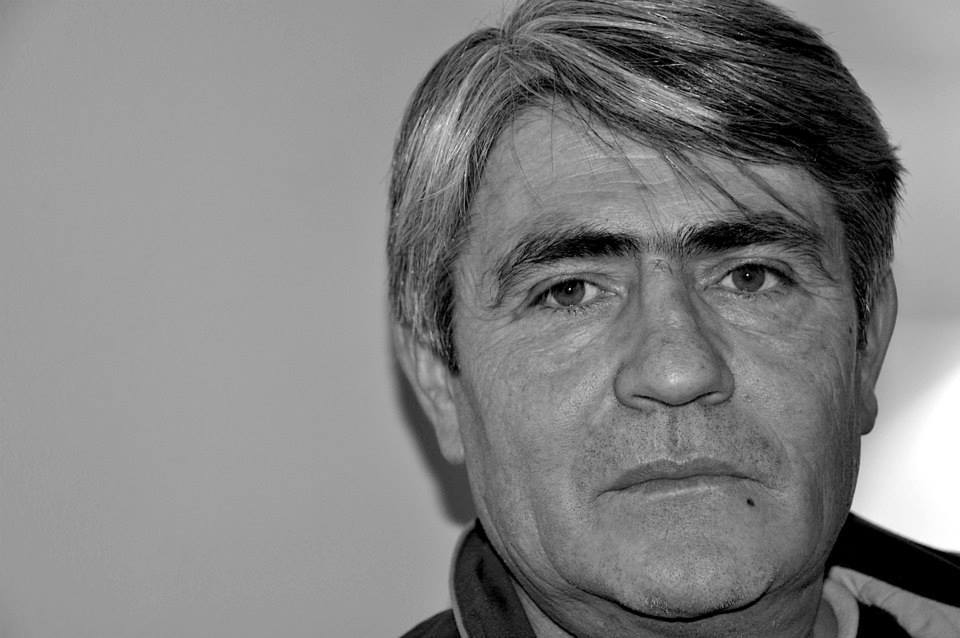
- Arif Peçenek at home in 2010

Personal information
- Date of birth: 10 October 1959
- Place of birth: Ankara, Turkey
- Date of death: 29 January 2013 (aged 53)
- Place of death: Ankara, Turkey
- Height: 1.81 m (5 ft 11 1/2 in)
- Position: Goalkeeper

Senior career*
Years	Team	Apps	(Gls)
1975–1979	Ankara Güneşspor	-	(0)
1979–1981	Ankara Şekerspor	53	(0)
1981–1993	MKE Ankaragücü	192	(0)
1993–1994	Istanbulspor	17	(0)
1994–1995	Adana Demirspor	3	(0)
Total		265	(0)

International career
1976–1978	Turkey U18	4/4	(0)
1978–1983	Turkey U21	6/6	(0)
1983–1986	Turkey	8/13	(0)

Managerial career
- 1995–1996: Vanspor (Assistant Manager)
- 1996–1997: Adanaspor (Assistant Manager)
- 1997–1998: Vanspor (Assistant Manager)
- 2000–2001: Türk Telekomspor
- 2000–2001: Körfez Belediyespor
- 2001–2002: Ankara Şekerspor
- 2002–2004: Kızılcahamam Belediyespor
- 2005–2010: MKE Ankaragücü (Youth Academy Dev. Coordinator)
- 2012–2013: TKİ Tavşanlı Linyitspor
- * Club domestic league appearances and goals as of 17.00, 10 April 2015 (UTC)

Arif Peçenek (10 October 1959 – 29 January 2013) was a Turkish football player and manager. Born in Ankara, he began his club football career with the capital club Ankara Güneşspor in 1976. Prosperous goalkeeper continued to play respectively in Ankara Şekerspor, MKE Ankaragücü, İstanbulspor and Adana Demirspor until his retirement in 1995. He successfully inserts 23 national team caps. Peçenek who is associated with MKE Ankaragücü and perceived as one of the greatest players in the club's history inserts more than 200 caps for this club. With 192 first division inserts Peçenek is in the list of players with most premier league inserts for MKE Ankaragücü in 13th place. After ending his football career, he moved into coaching specialist. He assisted in Vanspor, Adanaspor and again Vanspor the head coach Ali Osman Renklibay as an assistant coach. In 1999/2000 season Peçenek took over Türk Telekomspor as his first head coaching experience. He supervised subsequently Körfez Belediyespor, Ankara Şekerspor and Kızılcahamam Belediyespor. From 2005 to 2010, he held the Youth Academy Development Coordinator with the MKE Ankaragücü. In November 2012, he was introduced for the TKI Tavşanlı Linyitspor. He died on 29 January 2013 due to a heart attack in Ankara.

== Playing career ==
Peçenek began his club football career with the capital club Ankara Güneşspor in 1976. He was discovered in 1978 to the Turkish U-18 national team and completed four games. Through these games, several teams were aware of him. The second division Ankara Şekerspor reacted fastest and secured the services of the young goalkeeper before the 1979/1980 season. The change has been reported in several newspapers and Peçenek found nationwide attention. The reason for this considerable attention to a change was the extraordinary handling of the transfer. In return for the release of Peçenek no money paid, but exchanging them for one Holstein Cattle from Ankara Güneşspor. This curious trading took Peçenek himself with humor and said: "End of the season remains to be seen who will be more productive". This transfer still considered as one of the seven most interesting transfers in the world.

=== MKE Ankaragücü ===
For the summer of 1981 he moved to city rivals MKE Ankaragücü. Peçenek spent 13 years under the roof of MKE Ankaragücü. Currently, he remains as one of the ten players with the longest period in the club’s history. In his first two seasons Peçenek had sat over the team captain and the goalkeeper Adil Eric is left with almost always on the bench. Starting from the 1983/1984 season, he became the captain of the team, to be called as a legend and he escalated to the national team. He took over long parts of the number one position, and received the title of the most jersey capped goalkeeper with more than 200 caps in the MKE Ankaragücü history until his left in 1993. In the 1984/85 season Peçenek saw the highlight of his career. In addition to his regular place in the number one the following three seasons proceeded to grow by Peçenek. He was appointed to the Turkey national team and was part of the permanent players for the national team. Within this period, he nominated for 13 times and inserted the number one for eight times. In the summer of 1989/1990 season, he had a herniated disc surgery and missed almost a half season. For the new season MKE Ankaragücü committed the Yugoslav goalkeeper Rade Zalad due to the surgery of Peçenek. The ascended Peçenek-Zalad competition in the seasons of 1990/1991 and 1991/1992 has ended with the takeover of Peçenek. Although, he had the number one position again in the 1992/93 season, he left after thirteen seasons MKE Ankaragücü in the cause of having troubles with the board.

=== İstanbulspor and Adana Demirspor ===
The summer of 1993 Peçenek moved to second division İstanbulspor, although his 17 successful inserts, İstanbulspor missed the chance of promotion to the first division with the last match. After working for İstanbulspor, he moved to the first division Adana Demirspor, and played just three games due to the injuries. The summer of 1995, Peçenek ended his active career as a professional footballer.

== Coaching career ==
After ending his football career, he moved into coaching specialist. He assisted in Vanspor, Adanaspor and again Vanspor the head coach Ali Osman Renklibay as an assistant coach. In 1999/2000 season Arif Peçenek took over Türk Telekomspor as his first head coaching experience. He met the expectations and ended the season with a championship. At season's end he renewed his contract with Türk Telekomspor. However, this time he had certain problems with the board and these problems led him to resign in September 2000. Same season after 14 rounds he took over third division latter Körfez Belediyespor, and hold the team in the circuit. In August 2002, he took over his former club Ankara Şekerspor, but disputes between Peçenek and the board led him resign again in two months. After a pause he took over third division latter Kızılcahamam Belediyespor in November 2002. At season’s end, he kept the team in the circuit once again. Although his renewal with Kızılcahamam Belediyespor in 2003/2004 season, he resigned after 10 rounds due to different perspectives with the board. From 2005 to 2010, he held the Youth Academy Development Coordinator with the MKE Ankaragücü. In these five years many young players have been reached their true potential and currently numerous of them are playing in the super league. At the same time, in 2008, after obtaining UEFA TUTOR License, Peçenek attended many seminars and trainer courses as educator under the roof of Turkish Football Federation (TFF). Until his death, he was in the board of Turkish Professional Football Players Association since 2000. Additionally, he was in the board of Turkish Professional Football Trainers Association (TUFAD) Ankara Office since 2008.

=== TKI Tavşanlı Linyitspor ===
In November 2012, before 11 rounds he was introduced for the second division latter TKI Tavşanlı Linyitspor. The progress which was very observable in the following weeks, gave hope to the fans in terms of remaining in the division. Unfortunately, Peçenek died in line of duty on 29 January 2013 due to a heart attack in Ankara. Before 2013/2014 season, on 4 July 2013, TKI Tavşanlı Linyitspor board showed their fidelity to Arif Peçenek, and changed their training facilities name as “TKİ Tavşanlı Linyitspor Arif Peçenek Tesisleri”.

== Personal life ==
Peçenek graduated from high school in 1982 in Ankara. In a year he attended to the Gazi University Sports Education Degree in 1983. Due to being a professional football player, he had to drop off the university. However, in 2005, he attended to the classes again for two years, and he gained the right of graduation from university as well.

Peçenek married in 1987 and had a son in 1990. He died because of a heart attack on 29 January 2013 in Ankara.
