= 1926–27 Beşiktaş J.K. season =

Beşiktaş J.K.
1926–27 season
- President: (Turkey) Fuat Balkan
- Manager: (Hungary) Imre Zinger
- Stadium: Taksim Stadium
- Istanbul Football League: 3rd
- Turkish Football Cup: Did not win

1926-27 Beşiktaş JK squad

The 1926–27 season

was the club's 7th official football season

and the 24th year of the club's existence.

They finished 3rd in the 4th year of the Istanbul Football League,

behind the champion Galatasaray and runner up Fenerbahçe.

== Pre-season ==
Fenerbahçe (Turkey)	2 – 2	(Turkey) Beşiktaş

Juventus Bucuresti (Romania)	3 – 2	(Turkey) Beşiktaş

Olympia Bucuresti (Romania)	2 – 2	(Turkey) Beşiktaş

Fenerbahçe (Turkey)	4 – 2	(Turkey) Beşiktaş

Fenerbahçe (Turkey)	0 – 1	(Turkey) Beşiktaş
