= Çetiner Erdoğan =

Turkish footballer

Personal information
- Date of birth: 21 November 1949
- Place of birth: Kars, Turkey
- Date of death: 16 October 2017 (aged 67)
- Position: Winger

Senior career*
Years	Team	Apps	(Gls)
1969–1982	Boluspor	308	(41)

International career
1971–1973	Turkey U21	5	(0)
1971–1975	Turkey	2	(0)

Managerial career
- 1989: Boluspor
- 1992–1993: Mudurnuspor
- 1993–1994: Boluspor
- 1994–1995: Mudurnuspor
- 2003–2005: Boluspor
- * Club domestic league appearances and goals

Çetiner Erdoğan (21 November 1949 – 16 October 2017) is a retired Turkish footballer who played as a winger.
