= Ahmet Berman =

Turkish footballer

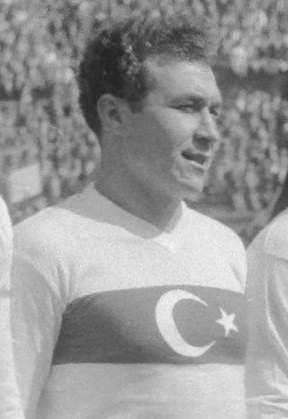

Personal information
- Date of birth: 1 January 1932
- Place of birth: Karagümrük, Turkey
- Date of death: 17 December 1980
- Height: 1.68 m (5 ft 6 in)
- Position: Left-back

Senior career*
Years	Team	Apps	(Gls)
194?–1955	Fatih Karagümrük		
1955–1959	Beşiktaş		
1959–1965	Galatasaray		
1965–1967	Vefa		

International career
1955–1962	Turkey	29	(0)
- * Club domestic league appearances and goals

Ahmet Berman (1 January 1932 – 17 December 1980) was a Turkish footballer who played for Turkey in the 1954 FIFA World Cup. He also played for Beşiktaş and Galatasaray.

He died on 17 December 1980, and was buried at the Feriköy Cemetery, Istanbul.

== Individual ==
- Beşiktaş J.K. Squads of Century (Bronze Team)
