= Engin Verel =

Turkish footballer

Personal information
- Full name: Engin Ramiz Verel
- Date of birth: 15 September 1956 (age 70)
- Place of birth: Istanbul, Turkey
- Height: 1.75 m (5 ft 9 in)
- Positions: Forward; midfielder

Senior career*
Years	Team	Apps	(Gls)
1973–1975	Galatasaray	42	(2)
1975–1979	Fenerbahçe	104	(15)
1979–1980	Hertha BSC	5	(0)
1980–1981	Anderlecht	3	(0)
1981–1983	Lille	57	(15)
1983–1986	Fenerbahçe	40	(1)
Total		251	(33)

International career
1974–1982	Turkey	26	(0)
- * Club domestic league appearances and goals

Engin Verel (born 15 September 1956) is a Turkish former professional footballer who spent most of his career with İstanbul-based rivals Fenerbahçe and Galatasaray.

== Career ==
Verel was born in Istanbul. He made his debut at the age of 17 with Galatasaray in 1973. He then moved to Fenerbahçe in 1975 where he played until 1979. He won 2 Turkish League titles with Fenerbahçe. He made 26 appearances for the Turkey national team.

He also played abroad for Hertha BSC in Germany, RSC Anderlecht in Belgium and Lille OSC in France. In 1983, Verel returned to his homeland, joining again Fenerbahçe he played there until his retirement in 1986.
