= Hüseyin Tok =

Turkish footballer

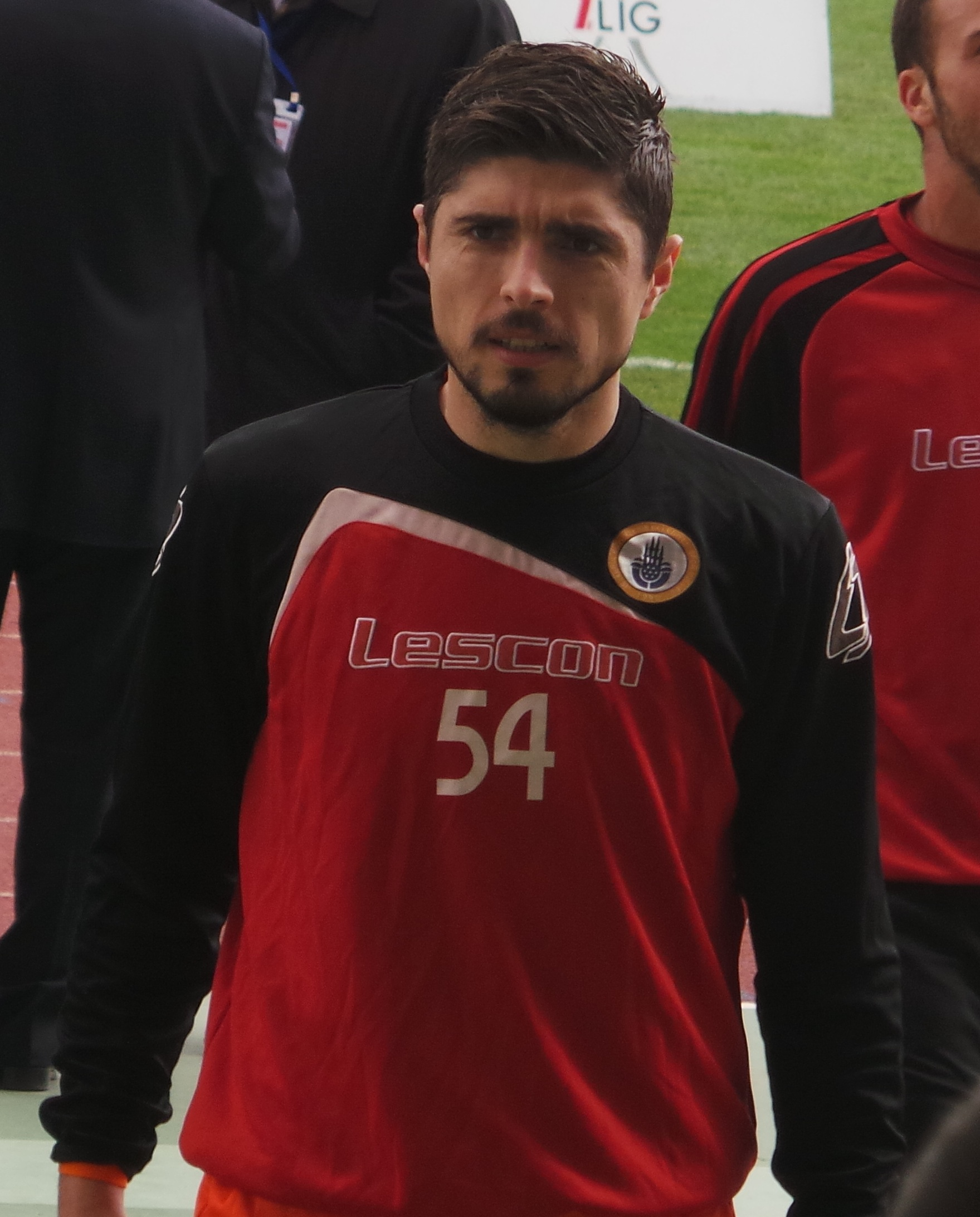

Personal information
- Full name: Hüseyin Tok
- Date of birth: 9 September 1988 (age 38)
- Place of birth: Sakarya, Turkey
- Height: 1.86 m (6 ft 1 in)
- Position: Center back

Team information
- Current team: Manisa Sanayispor

Youth career
- 2002–2007: Sakaryaspor

Senior career*
Years	Team	Apps	(Gls)
2007–2008	Sakaryaspor	32	(2)
2008–2013	Manisaspor	101	(6)
2013–2015	İstanbul BB	28	(0)
2015–2016	Balıkesirspor	15	(0)
2017–2018	Manisaspor	9	(0)
2018–2019	Sancaktepe		
2019–	Manisa Sanayispor	1	(0)

International career
2005	Turkey U17	3	(0)
2007	Turkey U19	4	(0)
2010	Turkey U21	4	(0)
- * Club domestic league appearances and goals as of 22 September 2019

Hüseyin Tok (born 9 September 1988) is a Turkish professional footballer who plays as a center back for Manisa Sanayispor. Tok is also a youth international, having been capped at the U-17, U-19, and U-21 levels.

== Life and career ==
Tok was born in Sakarya, Turkey. He began his footballing career with local club Sakaryaspor in 2002. Tok make his professional debut during the 2006-07 season. In 2008, he was transferred to Manisaspor.

Tok joined Manisa Sanayispor ahead of the 2019/20 season.

== International career ==
Tok has been capped at the U-17, U-19, and U-21 levels.
