= 1926–27 Istanbul Football League =

Istanbul Football League
- Season: 1926–27
- Champions: Galatasaray SK (9th title)

The 1926–27 İstanbul Football League season was the 20th season of the league. Galatasaray SK won the league for the 9th time.

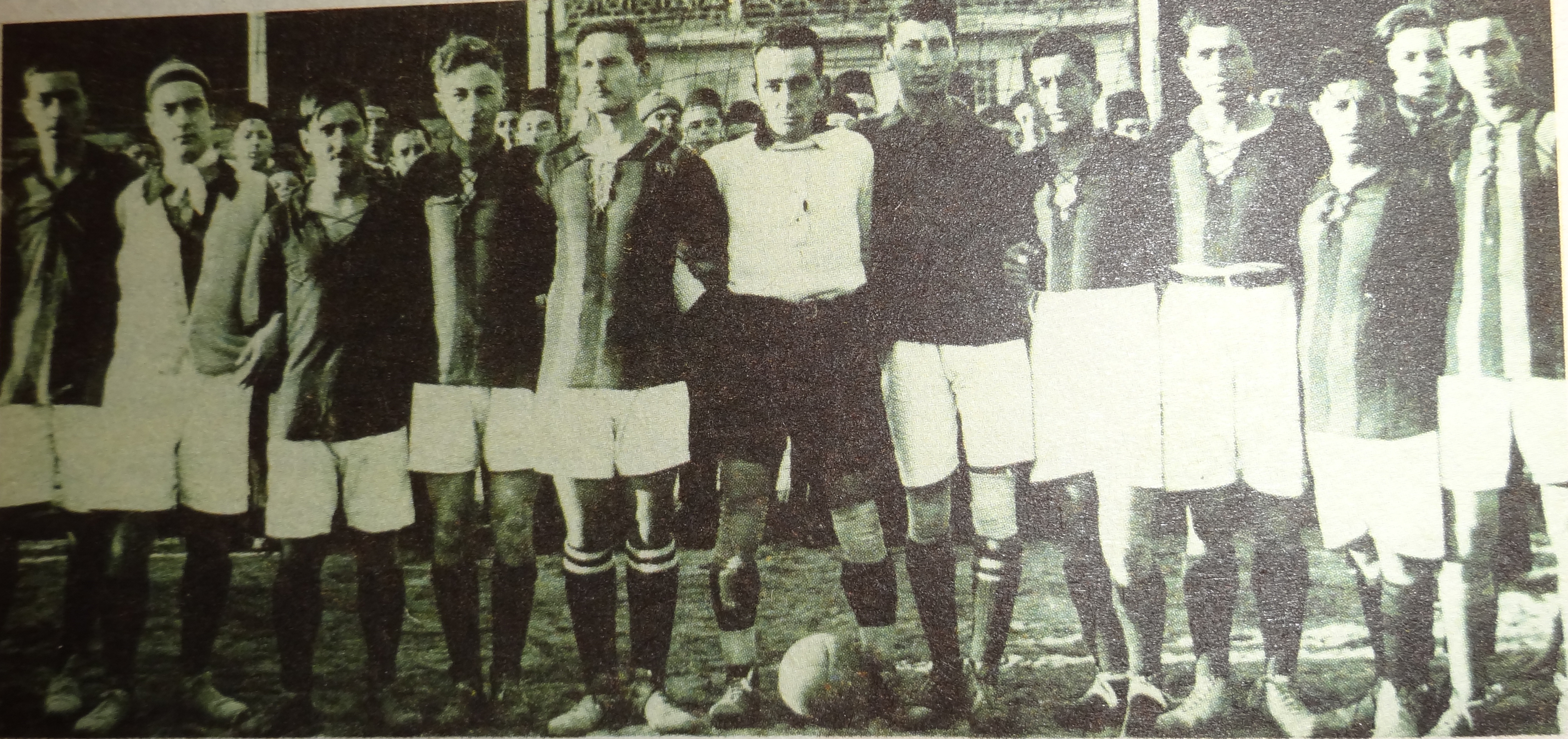
Galatasaray SK 1926-27 Champion Team

== Season ==
Pos	Team	Pld	W	D	L	GF	GA	GD	Pts
1	Galatasaray SK	7	6	1	0	26	6	+20	20
2	Fenerbahçe SK	7	4	2	1	24	10	+14	17
3	Küçükçekmece SK	7	3	1	3	14	14	0	14
4	Harbiye SK	7	3	1	3	10	6	+4	13 (Note: 1 point deducted?)
5	Vefa SK	7	3	0	4	14	13	+1	13
6	Beykoz 1908 S.K.D.	7	2	2	3	14	14	0	13
7	Beşiktaş JK	7	1	4	2	8	11	−3	12 (Note: 1 point deducted?)
8	Beylerbeyi SK	7	0	1	6	4	40	−36	8
