= Ali Osman Renklibay =

Turkish footballer (born 1948)

Personal information
- Date of birth: 24 October 1948 (age 78)
- Place of birth: Konya, Turkey
- Position: Forward

Youth career
- 1963–1969: Konya Anadolu Selçukspor

Senior career*
Years	Team	Apps	(Gls)
1969–1970	Ceyhanspor		
1970–1973	Adanaspor	56	(22)
1973–1978	Ankaragücü	113	(38)

International career
1971	Turkey U21	3	(0)

Managerial career
- 1991–1993: Konyaspor
- 1993–1994: Karamanspor
- 1994–1996: Ankaragücü
- 1996: Vanspor
- 1996–1997: Adanaspor
- 1997–1999: Vanspor
- 2000–2002: İstanbul Başakşehir
- 2002–2003: Göztepe
- 2003–2004: İstanbul Başakşehir
- 2005–2006: Konya Anadolu Selçukspor
- * Club domestic league appearances and goals

Ali Osman Renklibay (born 24 October 1948) is a Turkish professional football coach and a former player who played as a forward.

== Playing career ==
Renkiblay began his training in his native Konya with Konya Anadolu Selçukspor. He is the only player to be the top scorer in the top three divisions of the Turkish Football Federation; with Ceyhanspor in the TFF Second League, with Adanaspor in the TFF First League, and with Ankaragücü in the Süper Lig.

== Managerial career ==
After retiring as a professional footballer, Renklibay worked as a civil engineer before returning as a manager for various Turkish teams.
