= Talat Özkarslı =

Turkish footballer and manager (1938–2020)

Personal information
- Full name: Sefer Talat Özkarslı
- Date of birth: 21 March 1938
- Place of birth: Gaziantep, Turkey
- Date of death: 10 June 2020 (aged 82)
- Place of death: Turkey
- Height: 1.77 m (5 ft 10 in)
- Position: Defender

Youth career
- 1953–1960: Şehreküstü

Senior career*
Years	Team	Apps	(Gls)
1960–1961	Göztepe	29	(5)
1961–1971	Galatasaray	182	(15)
1971–1974	Gaziantepspor	28	(2)

International career^{‡}
1961–1962	Turkey B	2	(1)
1962–1966	Turkey U21	5	(0)
1962–1968	Turkey	26	(1)

Managerial career
- 1982–1983: Gaziantepspor
- * Club domestic league appearances and goals as of 4 April 2018 ‡ National team caps and goals as of 4 April 2018

Sefer Talat Özkarslı (21 March 1938 – 10 June 2020), nicknamed Koçero, was a Turkish football manager and player who played as a defender. Özkarslı is best known for his stint with Galatasaray from 1961 to 1971, where he helped them win three Süper Lig titles and seven other domestic trophies.

== Professional career ==
Özkarslı began playing football with his local side Şehreküstü. He was an all-star athlete who excelled in athletics, and after years of amateur success transferred to Göztepe. In 1961, Gündüz Kılıç convinced him to transfer to Galatasaray after and spent ten years there. After his tenure at Galatasaray, Özkarslı played for three years with his local club Gaziantepspor, and promoted them from the third division to the first division. Later in life, he briefly became their manager. On 5 February 2018 in Gaziantep the sports hall "Talat Özkarslı Kapalı Spor Salonu" was opened and named after Özkarslı, and a large major street was also named after him.

== Honours ==
Galatasaray

- Süper Lig (4): 1961–62, 1962–63, 1968–69, 1970–71
- Turkish Cup (3): 1962–63, 1963–64, 1965–66
- TSYD Cup (3): 1963–1964, 1966–1967, 1967–68
- Turkish Super Cup (1): 1968–69

Turkey

- ECO Cup: 1967

Sporting positions
Preceded by Metin Oktay	Galatasaray captain 1969–1971	Succeeded by Uğur Köken
