= Metin Kurt =

Turkish footballer (1948–2012)

Personal information
- Date of birth: 15 March 1948
- Place of birth: Karagümrük, Turkey
- Date of death: 24 August 2012 (aged 64)
- Place of death: Istanbul, Turkey
- Height: 1.79 m (5 ft 10 in)
- Position: Winger

Senior career*
Years	Team	Apps	(Gls)
1966–1967	Altay	4	(0)
1967–1971	PTT	93	(9)
1970–1971	→ Galatasaray (loan)	24	(10)
1971–1976	Galatasaray	129	(24)
1976–1977	Kayserispor	6	(0)

International career
1966–1967	Turkey U18	2	(1)
1969–1970	Turkey U21	9	(0)
1968–1975	Turkey	26	(4)

Managerial career
- 1992: Eyüpspor
- 1992–1993: Dikilitaş Spor
- * Club domestic league appearances and goals

Metin Kurt (15 March 1948 – 24 August 2012) was a Turkish football player, who played as a winger, and manager. He was nicknamed Çizgi Metin (English, "Sideline Metin") because he drew opponents towards him when he played. Kurt spent most of his career in the Turkish Süper Lig, and is best known for his stint with Galatasaray where he won three consecutive Süper Lig titles.

== Outside football ==
Kurt was a Communist and revolutionary sports worker, who was a TKP member and founded various unionist organizations for football. He briefly coached after his footballing career, and was sports writer for a magazine he released called "Sportmen".

== Personal life ==
Metin is the brother of the footballer İsmail Kurt.

== Death ==
Kurt died of a heart attack on 24 August 2012 in Istanbul, Turkey.

== Honours ==
Galatasaray

- Süper Lig: 1970–71, 1971–72, 1972–73
- TSYD Cup: 1970–1971
- Turkish Super Cup: 1971–72
- Turkish Cup: 1972–73, 1975–76
- Prime Minister's Cup: 1974–1975

Turkey

- ECO Cup: 1969

== See also ==
- Doping in association football (Galatasaray's doping practice)
