= Doğan Babacan =

Turkish football referee (1929–2018)

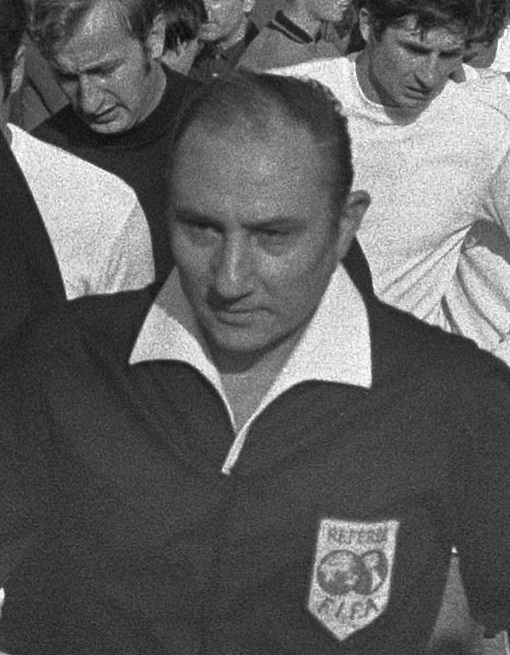
- Babacan in 1971
- Born: November 30, 1929; Istanbul, Turkey
- Died: May 18, 2018 (aged 88); Turkey
Years		Role
1955–1978		Referee

International
Years	League	Role
1968–1978	FIFA	Referee

Doğan Babacan (30 November 1929 – 18 May 2018) was a Turkish football referee. He was the first Turkish referee to supervise a match in FIFA World Cup history.

Babacan was born in Istanbul. He played football for Beşiktaş JK, Karşıyaka S.K., Kasımpaşa S.K. and Hacettepe. His career as a referee began in 1955 and he was placed on FIFA's Referees List in 1968. He is known for supervising the first round Group 1 match between West Germany and Chile in the 1974 FIFA World Cup. In that match, Babacan sent off Chilean Carlos Caszely. It was the first red card in World Cup history. On 10 April 1974 he sent off three Atlético Madrid players in the first leg of the European Cup semi-final match against Celtic in Glasgow.

Later he was referee for the 1975 UEFA Super Cup final between FC Bayern Munich and FC Dynamo Kyiv. He retired from international refereeing in 1978.

He died on 18 May 2018, aged 88.
