= 1906–07 Galatasaray S.K. season =

Galatasaray SK
1906–07 season
- President: Ali Sami Yen
- Manager: Boris Nikolof
- Stadium: Papazın Çayırı
- Istanbul Lig: 4th
Home colours

The 1906–07 season was Galatasaray SK's 3rd in existence and the club's 1st in the Istanbul Football League.

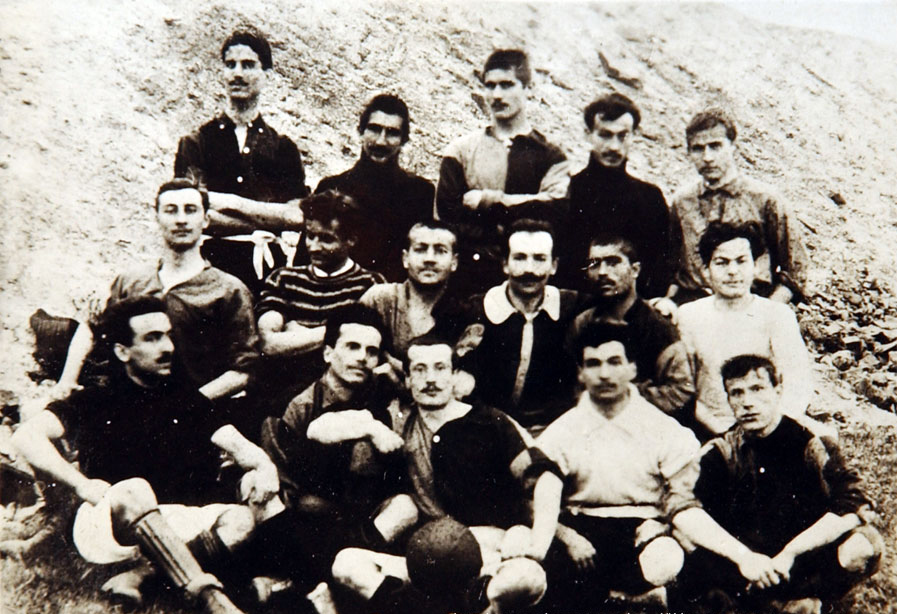

== Squad statistics ==
No.	Pos.	Name	IFL		Total	
No.	Pos.	Name	Apps	Goals	Apps	Goals
-	GK	(Ottoman Empire) Asım Tevfik Sonumut	0	0	0	0
-	GK	(Ottoman Empire) Ahmet Robenson	0	0	0	0
-	DF	(Kingdom of Serbia) Milo Bakic	0	0	0	0
-	DF	(Ottoman Empire) Refik Cevdet Kalpakçıoğlu	0	0	0	0
-	MF	(Ottoman Empire) Tahsin Nahit	0	0	0	0
-	MF	(Ottoman Empire) Bekir Sıtkı Bircan	0	0	0	0
-	MF	(Ottoman Empire) Talyos	0	0	0	0
-	MF	(Ottoman Empire) Celal İbrahim	0	0	0	0
-	MF	(Bulgaria) Boris Nikolof(C)	0	0	0	0
-	MF	(Ottoman Empire) Ali Sami Yen	0	0	0	0
-	FW	(Ottoman Empire) Kamil Soysal	0	0	0	0
-	FW	(Ottoman Empire) Abidin Daver	0	0	0	0
-	FW	(Ottoman Empire) Muzaffer Kazancı	0	0	0	0
-	FW	(Ottoman Empire) Ali Müsait	0	0	0	0
-	FW	(Ottoman Empire) Emin Bülent Serdaroğlu	0	0	0	0
-	FW	(Ottoman Empire) Reşat Şirvani	0	0	0	0

== Istanbul Football League ==
=== Classification ===
Pos	Team	Pld	W	D	L	GF	GA	GD	Pts
1	Cadi-Keuy FC	4	2	2	0	12	3	+9	6
2	Moda FC	4	2	1	1	10	3	+7	5
3	HMS Imogene FC	3	1	1	1	3	1	+2	3
4	Galatasaray	4	0	2	2	2	10	−8	2
5	Elpis FC	3	0	0	3	0	15	−15	0

=== Matches ===
Kick-off listed in local time (EEST)

25 November 1906
9:00

Galatasaray SK	1 – 1	HMS Imogene FC
Boris Nikolof min(80)	(Report) First league match	? min(70)

Union Club Field, Istanbul
Referee: James LaFontaine

November 1906

Galatasaray SK	1 – 1	Moda FC
Emin Bülent Serdaroğlu	(Report)	Celal İbrahim (Own goal)

Union Club Field, Istanbul
Referee: unknown

1906

Galatasaray SK	0 – 3	Cadi-Keuy FC
	(Report)

Union Club Field, Istanbul
Referee: unknown

1906

Galatasaray SK	? – ?	Elpis FC
cancelled	(Report)	cancelled

Union Club Field, Istanbul
Referee: Unknown

== Friendly Matches ==
26 November 1906

Galatasaray SK	0 – 5	Baltalimanı FC
	[ (Report) ]

Union Club Field, Istanbul
Referee: James Lafontaine
