= History of Galatasaray S.K. =

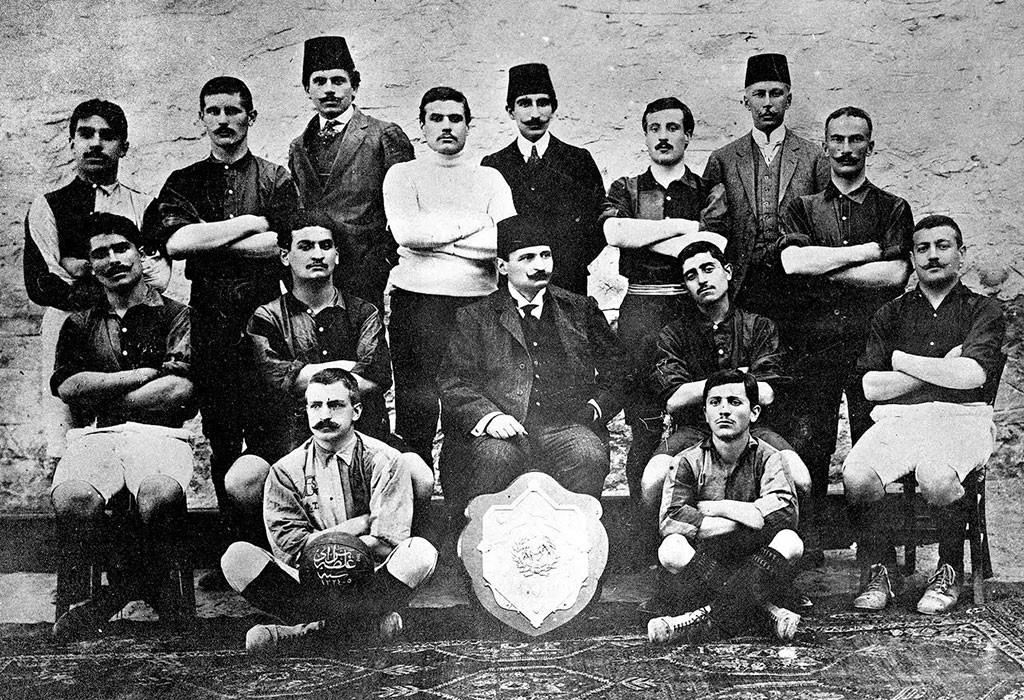
Photo of Galatasaray members after winning the Istanbul Football League championships, 1908–1909. On foot: Adnan, Milo Bakiş, Ali Sami (founder), Ahmet Robenson, Asım Tevfik, Emin Bülent, Hamit, Fuat. Seated: Celal Ibrahim (KIA, 1917), Sabri Mahir, Tevfik Fikret (headmaster), Hasan, Bekir. Sitting on ground: Horace Armitage (coach and captain), İdris (KIA, 1911).

The history of Galatasaray covers over 100 years of the sports from the club based in Istanbul, Turkey. Established in 1905, the club became one of the most successful clubs in the history of Turkish football.

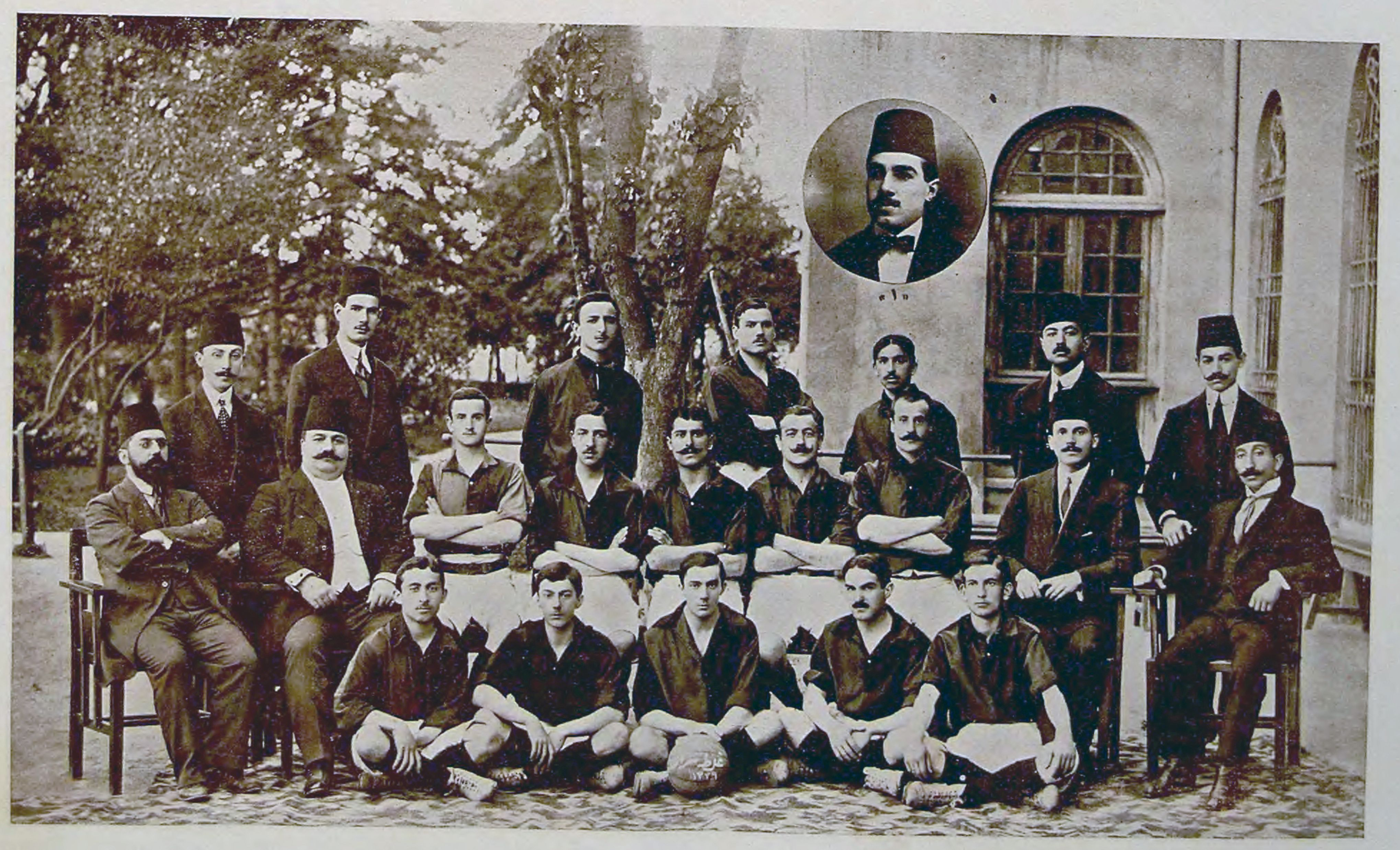
Galatasaray S.K. 1914

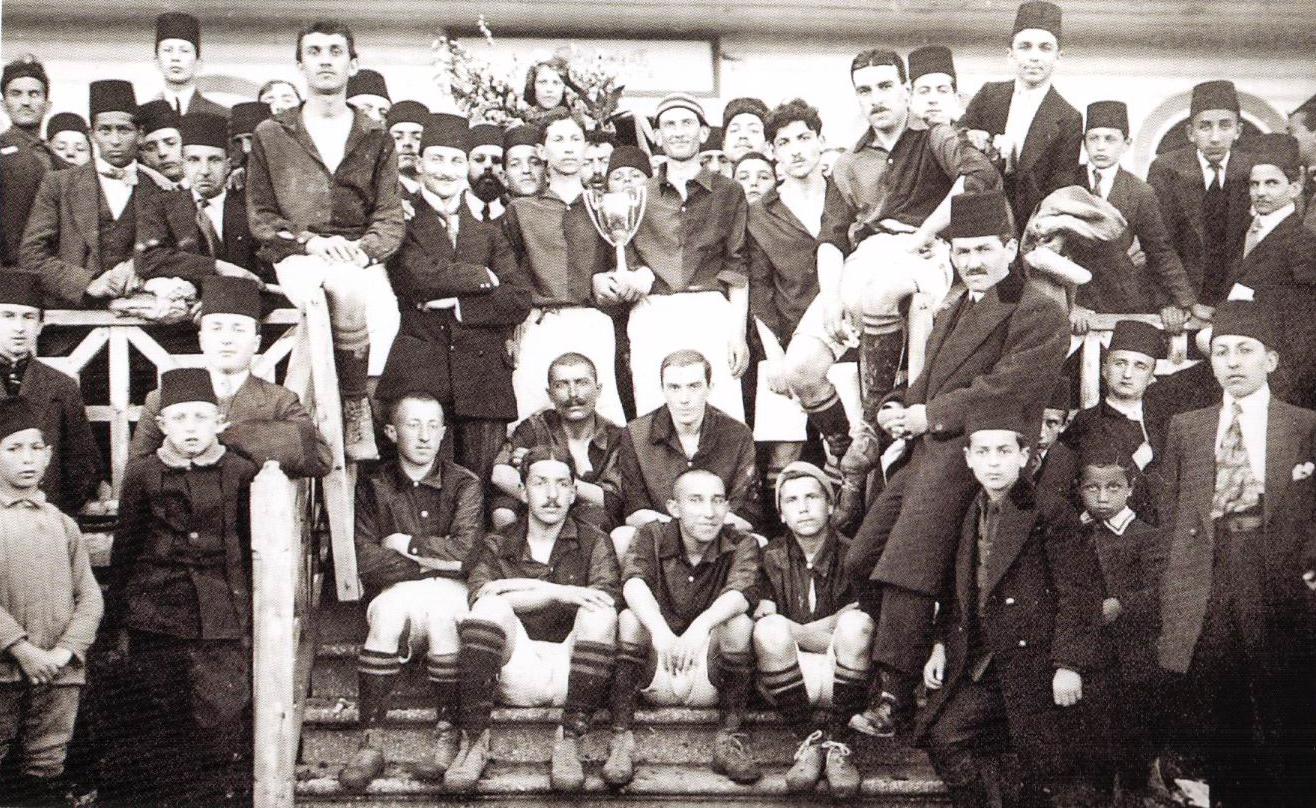
After winning the Istanbul Football League championship, 1914–1915

== First steps and foundation ==
After being influenced by the French Lycée model, the Galatasaray High School became much more of a modern school in September 1868. French was the main language for instructing, and many teachers were European. The students included members of all religious and ethnic communities from the Ottoman Empire. The school introduced sports (mainly gymnastics) as a new school subject and Monsieur Curel was the first gymnastics teacher. In 1899, a "football" first came to Galatasaray High School, but the pupils just kicked the ball at the Grand Cour of the school. In autumn 1902 Ali Sami Yen visited his uncle Suphi in Moda and on his way to him he saw Englishmen playing football at Moda field. He told his friends of this new sport, and on October 14, 1905 (which corresponds to "1 Teşrinievvel 1321" according to the Islamic Rumi calendar; hence the common error of giving the date as "1 October 1905" by ignoring the 13 days of difference between the Rumi calendar and Gregorian calendar before the Ottoman calendar adjustment reforms of 1917–1918), during the History and Literature lesson of teacher Mehmet Ata Bey, they founded the club in the back rows of the classroom Literature 5B.

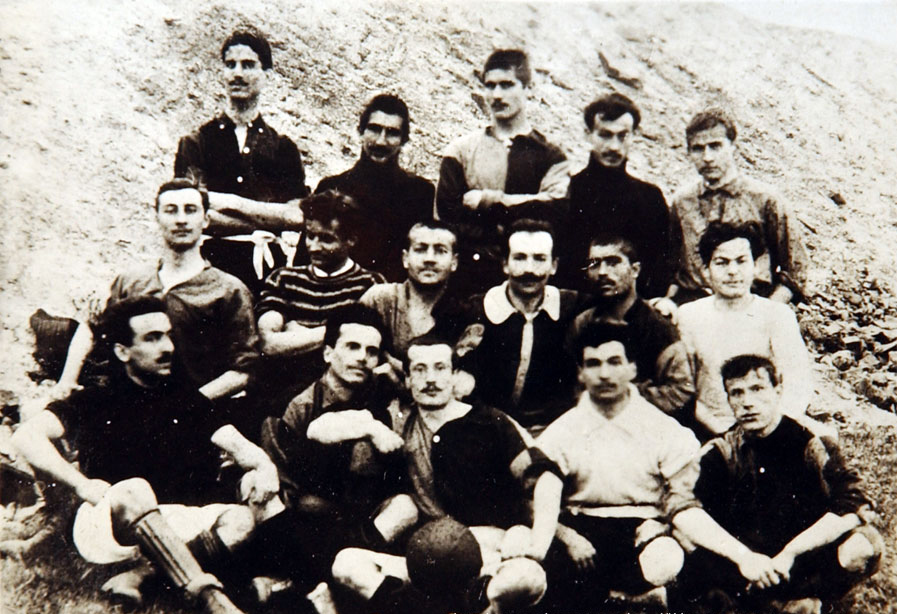
The first ever recorded photo of Galatasaray (1905)

In addition to Ali Sami Yen (Club member No. 1), who was the driving force behind the club's foundation, Asim Tevfik Sonumut (2), Emin Bülent Serdaroğlu (3), Celal Ibrahim (4), Boris Nikolov (5), Milo Bakić (6), Pavle Bakić (7), Bekir Sitki Bircan (8), Tahsin Nihat (9), Reşat Şirvanizade (10), Hüseyin Hüsnü (11), Refik Cevdet Kalpakçıoğlu (12) and Abidin Daver (13) were also involved in the decision to organize such a club. Their first match was against Kadıköy Faure School and they won this match 2–0. There were discussions about the club's name, in which some suggested Gloria (victory) and others Audace (courage), but it was decided that its name would be Galatasaray.

Our aim is to play together like Englishmen, to have a color and a name and to beat the non – Turkish teams. –Ali Sami Yen

According to researcher Cem Atabeyoğlu, Galatasaray took its name from one of its first matches. In that match, Galatasaray won 2–0 over Rûm club and the spectators called them "Galata Sarayı efendileri" (in English: Gentlemen of Galata Palace), and, after this event, they adopted that name and started to call their club "Galata Sarayı". In 1905, during the era of the Ottoman Empire, there were no laws for associations so the club could not be registered officially, but, after the 1912 Law of Association, the club registered legally.

This was how the first Turkish football club was founded. Among with the founder Ali Sami Yen, the co-founders were the ones who were keen to do this sport, such as Asim Tevfik Sonumut, Reşat Şirvani, Cevdet Kalpakçıoğlu, Abidin Daver and Kamil.

At first, the colours of Galatasaray were red and white. These are the colours in the modern Turkish flag. The Turkish Republic, however, was not founded at that time. Therefore, this decision caused the repressive administration of the day to feel uncomfortable and the administration subsequently pressured the footballers. For this reason, on December 26, 1906 the colors were changed to yellow and black. The eight-piece halved design kit was ordered from the Sports Outfitter William Shillcock based in Birmingham, United Kingdom. After a heavy 0–5 loss to Baltalimanı in a friendly match the new colours yellow and black were counted as inauspicious.

On December 6, 1908 new colors were chosen as red and yellow. Ali Sami Yen stated, "After we have been in and out of several shops, we saw two different elegant-looking wool materials in Fatty Yanko's store at Bahçekapısı (between Eminönü and Sirkeci in Istanbul, now called Bahçekapı). One of them was quite dark red, resembling the cherry color, and the other a rich yellow with a touch of orange. When the sales clerk made the two fabrics fly together with a twist of his hand they became so bright that it reminded us the beauty of a goldfinch. We thought we were looking at the colors flickering in burning fire. We were picturing the yellow-red flames shining on our team and dreaming that it would take us to victories. Indeed it did."

== Pre-professional period ==
=== Ali Sami Yen Era ===
Ali Sami Yen is the founder of the club, and the first president of club that served until the 1920s. Since the Turkish republic founded in 1923, Ali Sami Yen did a great job, both founding and developing the first Turkish football club and protecting it against the strict rules of the former state of command in Istanbul, the Ottoman Empire.

Between 1905 and 1906 Galatasaray just played friendly matches. Since there were not any Turkish teams, Galatasaray joined the Istanbul Football League that was consisting of English and Greek teams in the season of 1906–1907. In its first season, in the Istanbul Football League Galatasaray finished fourth. Above the Greek team Elpis FC and behind champions Cadi Keuy FRC, Moda FC and HMS Imogene FC. The next season the club finished third in the Istanbul Football League. With their first championship title, which was won in 1908–1909, they heralded the beginning of Turkish football history.

=== The First Dynasty (1908–1916) ===
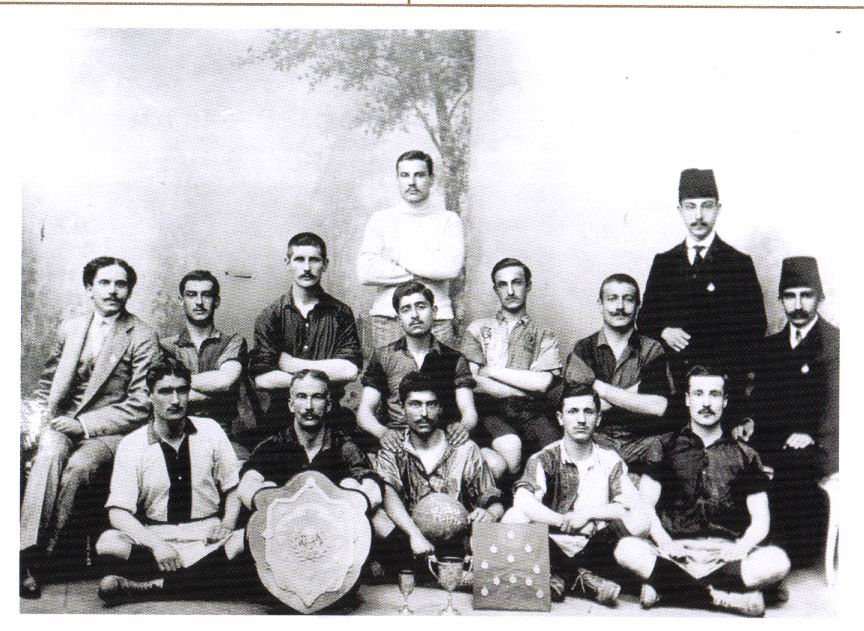
Istanbul Football League Champions – Galatasaray SK 1909–1910

In 1908, Galatasaray signed Horace Armitage, who had already won the league twice with Cadi Keuy, as a player and as manager and the first dynasty of Galatasaray and Turkish football begun. The club won three consecutive Istanbul Football League championships in 1909, 1910 and 1911.

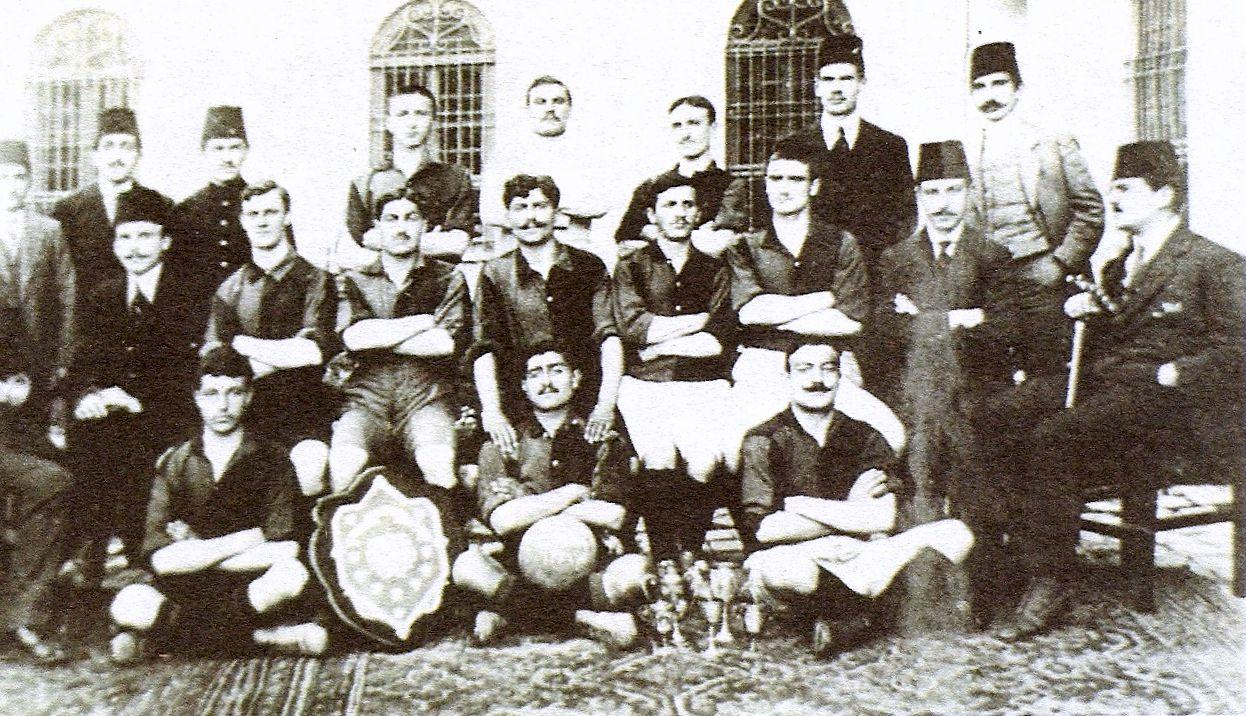
Istanbul Football League Champions – Galatasaray SK 1910–1911

Although Armitage left the club in 1911, the club went on to win the league in 1915 and 1916.

Ali Sami Yen, the founder of Galatasaray Sports Club, was also the first League President of "Turkiye Futbol Birligi (1911).

=== The Second Dynasty (1921–1931) ===
The crest used in the 1920s

In 1920, player and captain Necip Şahin became manager of the team, but he still played for the club. After five years without winning a title, the club eventually won the league title in 1922. In the same year, Necip Şahin quit as manager and Adil Giray took over as player-manager. He could not win a title until 1924 and Ali Sami Yen decided to sign Billy Hunter who was at that time the coach of the Turkey national team.

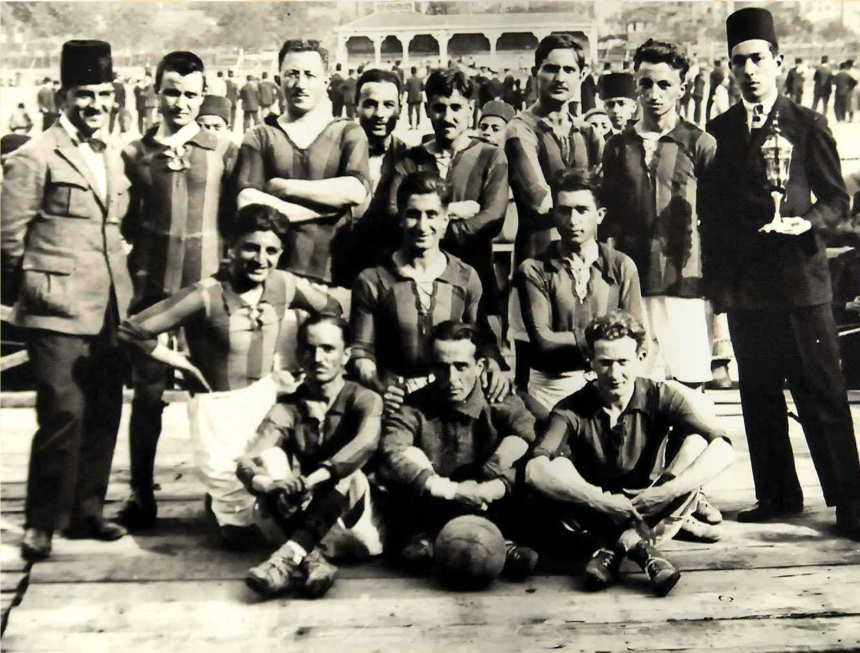
Istanbul Football League Champions – Galatasaray SK 1921–1922

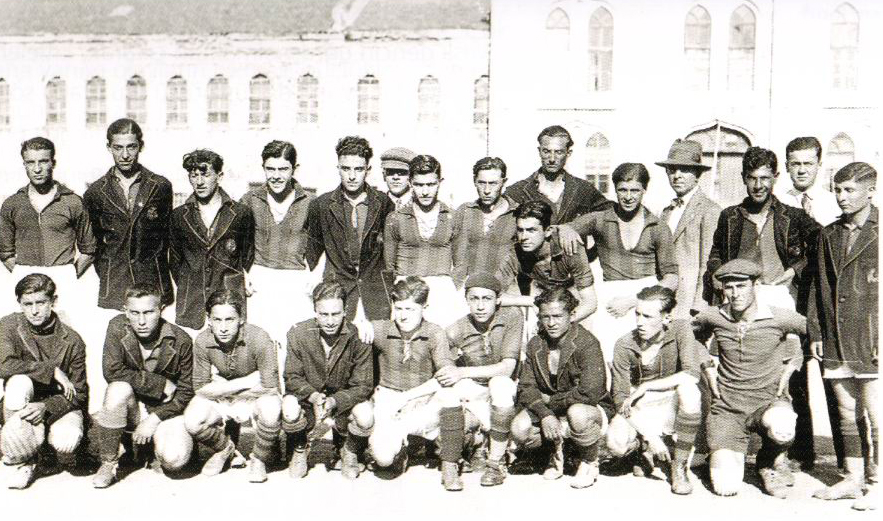
Istanbul Football League Champions – Galatasaray SK 1924–1925

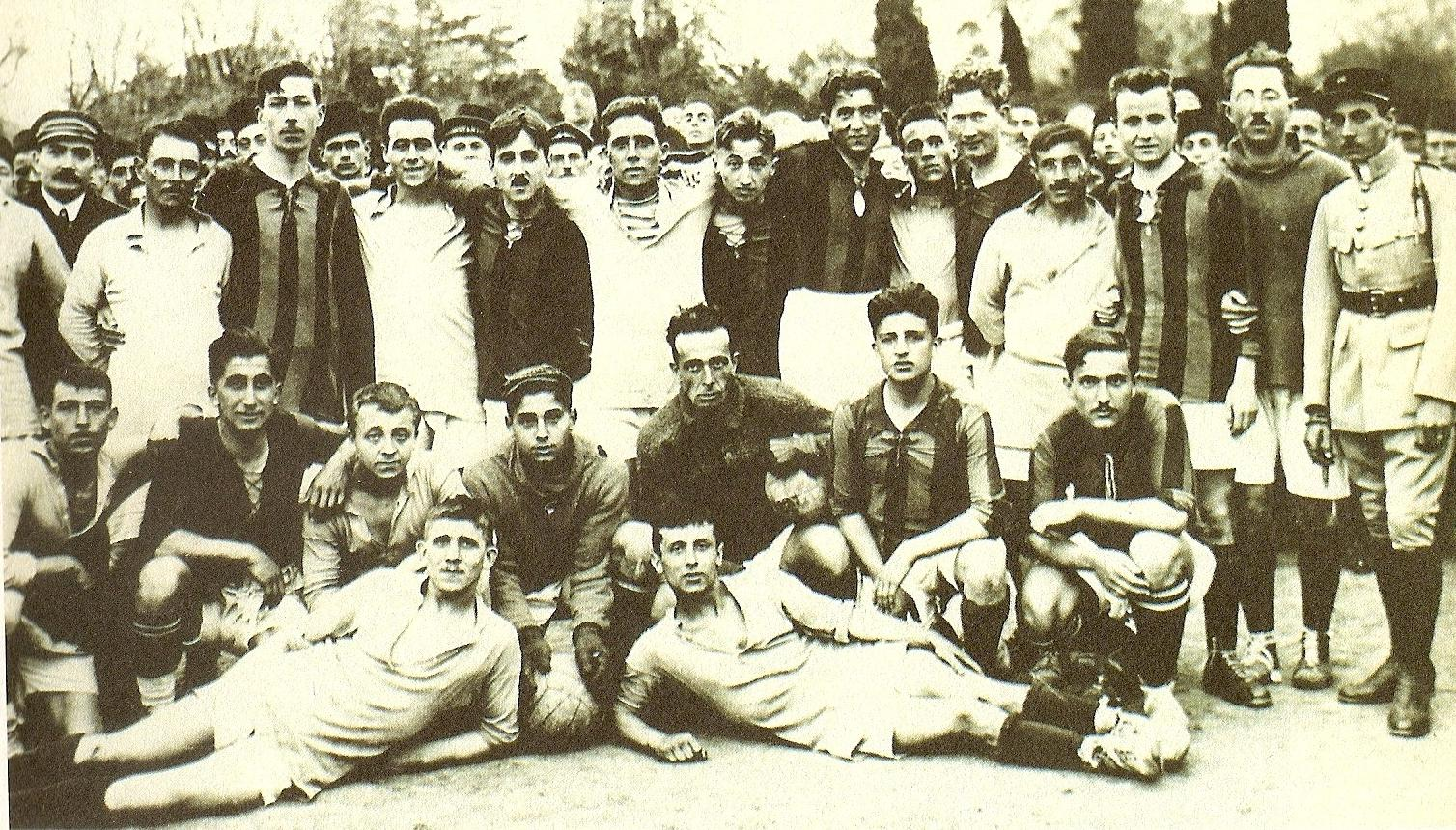
Istanbul Football League Champions – Galatasaray SK 1925–1926

They won the Istanbul League three consecutive times (in 1925, 1926, 1927). The 1928 championship was aborted due to the Olympic Games in Amsterdam. Hunter quit as manager in 1928 and Galatasaray legend Nihat Bekdik became player-manager and led the club to the 1929 title, as well as finishing second in 1930. Because of the Olympic Games, the club missed the chance to win the league in five consecutive years. The star player of the 1920s was Nihat Bekdik. He played for Galatasaray for twenty years, and was captain for twelve years (1924–1936).

In 1931, the club won the Istanbul Football League for the eleventh time; it was the club's sixth title in ten years/nine seasons.

=== Bad years (1932–1948) ===
After a dispute about amateurism-professionalism between Galatasaray members in 1933, the group which favored a more professional club left Galatasaray and founded the Güneş. Thanks to financial and political power, the new club was able to sign the best players of Galatasaray, and the fall of Galatasaray began. Between 1932 and 1949, the club could not win the Istanbul League. In 1933, Galatasray won the Istanbul Shield and, in 1939, the Milli Küme. It was not just the football team that was in a crisis, however; the whole club was in a chaotic situation. Between 1930–1941, there had been fifteen presidents and ten managers.

Star player Nihat Bekdik quit in 1936, though a new star joined in 1934, Gündüz Kılıç. Thanks to both players, the club were runners up of the Istanbul Football League in 1934–1935 and 1935–1936. With Kiliç, the club won the Istanbul Cup in 1942 and 1943 and were runners up of the Istanbul Football League in 1941–1942.

=== Back again (1949–1958) ===
In 1948, the club signed Pat Molloy and, after eighteen years, Galatasaray won the Istanbul Football League in the 1948–1949 season. In 1952, the Istanbul Football League became a professional league (Istanbul Professional League). In the same year, Galatasaray legend Gündüz Kılıç quit at the age of just 33 and became the club manager for the 1952–1953 season. He returned in 1954 and stayed till 1957. During his second coaching period, between 1954 and 1957, the club won the Istanbul Football League in 1954–1955 and 1955-1956.

The European Champion Clubs' Cup started in 1955–1956, but the first nationwide Turkish League started in 1959. Due to the Istanbul Football League being the strongest league in Turkey, Galatasaray participated at the 1956–1957 European Champion Clubs' Cup season. Galatasaray lost to Dinamo București 3–1 in Bucharest, but managed to win in Istanbul 2–1. Although the club was eliminated from the competition, it was a historical participation. Galatasaray became the first Turkish club to play in a UEFA competition, the first Turkish club to score in a UEFA competition and the first Turkish club to win a match in a UEFA competition. In 1957, after Kiliç quit, George Dick became manager of Galatasaray and the club won their fifteenth and last Istanbul Football League title in 1958.

In 1955, the club signed the 19-year-old Izmir Football League top scorer of 1954–1955 Metin Oktay, and a new era started.

== Professional period ==
=== Into the National League: 1959 ===
Türkiye Profesyonel 1. Ligi (today it is organized with the name Süper Lig) was formed in 1959, just after the foundation of UEFA in 1954. This is the top-flight professional league in Turkish nationwide football, and the most popular sporting competition in the country. The 1959 Milli Lig (National League) was the first season of professional football in Turkey. The league was made up of sixteen clubs split into two groups: the Kırmızı Grup (Red Group) and Beyaz Grup (White Group), the colours of the Turkish flag. The first season took place in the calendar year of 1959, instead of 1958–59, because the qualifying stages took place in 1958. The final consisted of two legs and took place between the winners of each group. Galatasaray won the Kırmızı Grup and Fenerbahçe won the Beyaz Grup. Galatasaray won the first match 1–0. Metin Oktay scored the goal and the ball ripped the net, but Fenerbahçe won the second 4–0, winning 4–1 on aggregate. Metin Oktay finished top scorer with eleven goals. Although Metin Oktay became Gol Kralı in 1960 and 1961, the club could not win the league, finishing third in 1960 and second in 1961.

=== The Third Dynasty (1962–1966) ===
For the third time, Gündüz Kılıç became the manager of Galatasaray in 1960. Galatasaray won the league in 1961–1962 and 1962-1963. In the 1962–1963 season, the club scored 105 goals, which is still a Süper Lig record, with Metin Oktay the topscorer for the fourth time. In the same season, the TFF started the Turkish Cup and Galatasaray won both final legs 2–1 against Fenerbahçe and became the first club to win the double. Galatasaray could not win the Süper Lig for the next five seasons, but managed to win the Turkish Cup four times in a row, which is still a Süper Lig record. Altay in 1964, Fenerbahçe in 1965 and Beşiktaş in 1966 all lost the Turkish Cup final to Galatasaray. In 1966, the TFF started the Turkish Super Cup. Galatasaray won the first Turkish Super Cup beating Süper Lig champion Beşiktaş 2–0 in Ankara.

After seven consecutive seasons and a total of eleven seasons, Galatasaray manager Gündüz Kılıç quit. His managerial record at the club included winning two Istanbul Football League championships, two Süper Lig championship titles, four Turkish Cup and one Turkish Super Cup.

=== The Fourth Dynasty (1969–1973) ===
After five seasons without winning the Süper Lig, the new Galatasaray president Selahattin Beyazıt signed Tomislav Kaloperović as the new manager of the club. Galatasaray became champions and Galatasaray legend Metin Oktay ended his career winning the Gol Kralı for the sixth time, which is still a record in the Süper Lig. After finishing eighth in the 1969–1970 season, the club won three consecutive Süper Lig championships in 1971,1972 and 1973 with help of doping. It was the first time that any club had won the Süper Lig three times in a row.

=== The Renaissance (1984–1992) ===
==== Derwall and Denizli era: 1984–1992 ====
German coach Jupp Derwall (1927–2007), shocked observers by turning down several job offers in the Bundesliga in favour of accepting the manager's position at Turkish club Galatasaray. At the time, Turkish football was not well regarded in Europe, and Turkish clubs had never made any real impression on the international scene. The arrival of Derwall, an internationally respected and experienced coach, changed this perception, and his tenure at Galatasaray is often credited with having helped spark the revival in the fortunes of Turkish football. As well as winning one national championship and one Turkish Cup, Derwall's time in Istanbul also involved his introducing modern Western European training techniques and tactical ideas to the Turkish game. Therefore, he is regarded as the revolutionizer of Turkish football. Two of Turkey's most respected coaches, Fatih Terim and Mustafa Denizli, both trained under Derwall during his time in Turkey, and have been quick to praise Derwall's influence.

Derwall retired from coaching with Galatasaray in 1987; despite speculation that he might take over as manager of the Turkey national football team, he chose instead to return to Germany and enjoy his retirement.

Derwall's assistant coach Mustafa Denizli took his position after Derwall left. Denizli kept Galatasaray on the road to progress with success. It was not luck, nor coincidence, but the outcome of the years of hard work, when Galatasaray made a historic run for Turkish football and reached the semi-finals of the Champions League of 1989.

=== The Fifth Dynasty (1992–2002): top of Europe ===
==== Alp Yalman era: 1990–1996 ====
Alp Yalman was elected as the club president in 1990, a position he held for six years. Galatasaray won two league titles, two national cups and two national super cups while Alp Yalman was the president. He usually worked with German coaches, Karl-Heinz Feldkamp, Reiner Hollmann and Reinhard Saftig. Besides domestic success, Galatasaray drew the attention of observers after eliminating Manchester United at the UEFA Champions League knockout stage in 1993. Development in Turkish football continued, led by Galatasaray under Alp Yalman's presidency.

==== Süren and Terim era: 1996–2000 ====
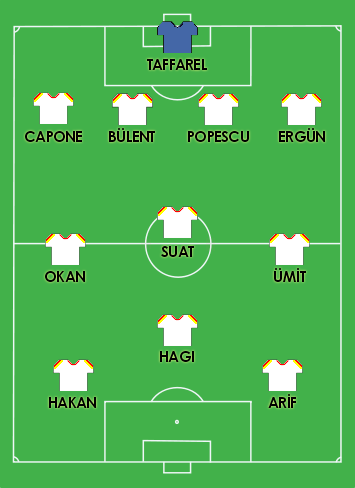
UEFA Cup Final match line-up against Arsenal, 17 May 2000

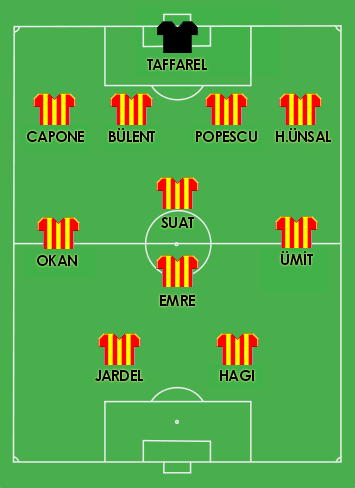
Super Cup match line-up against Real Madrid, 25 August 2000

Galatasaray's most successful era came in the late 1990s, when the club won the UEFA Cup and European Super Cup and became the first Turkish football club ever to win a European trophy. They were aided in this by one of Turkey's best generation of home grown footballers who went on to finish third at the 2002 FIFA World Cup and played in the quarter-finals of UEFA Euro 2000.

Between 1996 and 2000, Galatasaray won four consecutive Turkish league titles which is a record which the club still holds. This stability of success was crowned when the club won the Turkish League title, the Turkish Cup and the UEFA Cup in the 1999-2000 season.

All of these successes came under the coaching of Fatih Terim and visionary club president Faruk Süren.

Fatih Terim is known as the most successful manager of Galatasaray. After he left, Galatasaray won the UEFA Super Cup in 2000. The club then reached the quarter-finals of the Champions League in 2001, both under the coaching of Mircea Lucescu, though since then there haven't been any notable appearances in the higher levels of European cups.

=== Ups and downs 2002–2011 ===
==== Canaydin era: 2002–2008 ====
Galatasaray entered the new millennium as one of the elite football clubs in Europe. However, as the team of 1996–2000 got older, the football section was unable to replenish the team with young stars. As the success faded, the club struggled with economic problems and Galatasaray Chairman Özhan Canaydın, who was elected in 2002, was widely criticized for this failure.

In this period, the club worked on establishing projects like Galatasaray Store, Galatasaray Magazine, Galatasaray EUROPA and Galatasaray TV in order to improve the club's relationship with the fans and increase income. But the most complex project remained the building of a new stadium, which had been planned since the 1990s. Construction finally began in December 2007.

Once completed in 2009, Aslantepe will be used mostly for football matches, particularly it will host the home matches of Galatasaray. The stadium has a capacity of 52,000 people, replacing their previous stadium Ali Sami Yen Stadium.

Galatasaray became champions for the 2007–2008 season. Cevat Güler the champion manager of the squad said that this championship was no miracle but months of hard work after a season with many pitfalls.

==== Polat era: 2008–2011 ====
Adnan Polat became chairman in 2008 and Michael Skibbe became manager. The club won the Turkish Super Cup after beating Kayserispor 2–1. In the 2008–2009 season, Galatasaray were eliminated from the UEFA Champions League by Steaua București, though they qualified for the UEFA Cup. Galatasaray qualified to group stage after beating Bellinzona 6–4 on aggregate. Galatasaray came second in Group B and were drawn against Bordeaux. The club beat the French side 4–3 on aggregate and progressed to face Hamburg. The first leg finished in a 1–1 draw but the club was eliminated from the fourth round following a 3–2 loss, despite Galatasaray leading 2–0 in the first half. Michael Skibbe was sacked after a 5–2 loss against relegation battlers Kocaelispor and was replaced with Bülent Korkmaz. Galatasaray competed with Fenerbahçe for a place in the UEFA Europa League but lost the battle despite a 2–1 win over Sivasspor, league runners up due to Fenerbahçe's 2–1 win against Trabzonspor at an away match. Galatasaray finished the league with 61 points in fifth place. Milan Baroš was their top scorer of the season.

In 2009–10 season, Frank Rijkaard became manager. Galatasaray started the season very well and won the first six matches. But this performance was not to last and the club finished the season in third place. Galatasaray started UEFA Europa League in the second Preliminary Round. The club beat Tobol with 3-1 aggregate, Maccabi Netanya by 10-1 and Levadia Tallinn 6-1, and qualified to group stage. Galatasaray finished first in Group F and faced with Atlético Madrid, the eventual winners. The first leg finished in a 1–1 draw but the second one was a 2–1 loss and they were eliminated from in the third round.

In 2010–11 season, Galatasaray started the UEFA Europa League in the second Preliminary Round and beat Serbian OFK Belgrade with 7-3 aggregate, but were eliminated at next round to Ukrainian Karpaty Lviv in a 3-3 aggregate with an away goal rule. Galatasaray started Süper Lig badly and lost the first two matches against Sivasspor and Bursaspor. The club won the next four games but Rijjkaard was sacked after losing Ankaragücü at home match with a 4–2 score and was replaced with Gheorghe Hagi. Hagi also was sacked after elimination from Turkish Cup, the last chance for the club for qualifying for European competition, by Gaziantepspor by a 3-2 aggregate and losing at home match against their arch-rivals Fenerbahçe with a 2–1 score after leading 1–0 score at first half at Round 26 of Süper Lig. Despite Bülent Ünder taking over the manager's position, Galatasaray dropped to 14th place at Round 28. Later, the team recovered from this position and finished the league in eighth behind Fenerbahçe on 36 points, the league champions. Galatasaray endured the worst season after since the 1981-82 one, breaking the losing match record with 16. They also finished with negative goal difference, scoring 41 goals and conceding 46.

=== The Sixth Dynasty (2011–present) ===
==== Aysal era: 2011–2014 ====
On May 14, 2011, Aysal replaced Adnan Polat to become the 34th President of Galatasaray, with a record of the highest majority of votes in the 106-year-history of Galatasaray, winning 2,998 of the 4,019 votes cast.[1] The previous record was set by outgoing Adnan Polat, who won 2,944 of the 5,234 votes during the chairmanship election in March 2008. After an unsuccessful season, Galatasaray were unable to qualify for European football. After the internal conflict amongst board members, in addition to the poor performance of the squad during the 10-11 season, Galatasaray appointed a new chairman in Ünal Aysal. Ünal Aysal's first scoop for building a better Galatasaray squad to claim the dominance in the Süper Lig was to appoint a new manager. Ünal Aysal called up Fatih Terim, his first, and the only choice, for a third time to manage Galatasaray, and the third Fatih Terim era for Galatasaray had begun. Galatsaray won the 2011–2012 Süper Lig. It was the eighteenth League title for the club and Fatih Terim set a new record by winning the Süper Lig for the fifth time as a manager. It was also the first season at new home ground the Türk Telekom Arena. He managed to extend this record to six, when Galatasaray won the 2012–2013 Süper Lig.

Galatsaray won the treble in the 2014–15 season, winning Süper Lig, Turkish Cup and Süper Kupa. It was the sixth double for the club and the first one after 15 years.

==== The Imparator is back again ====
Despite winning the Turkish Cup in 2015–2016 for the third consecutive time - the second best run at the history of the cup - the club finished the season in sixth place. During the season, the new president Dursun Aydın Özbek fired the treble-winning coach of the 2014–15 season Hamza Hamzaoğlu after bad result at the 2015–16 UEFA Champions League campaign, and hired the legendary coach of the 1980s, Mustafa Denizli. The spell of Mustafa Denizli lasted till 29 February 2016 and Jan Olde Riekerink was hired as the new manager of the team until February 2017, when he was then replaced by Igor Tudor. Despite being unbeaten in the first ten weeks, the club fired the Igor Tudor after a run of bad results and the legendary manager Fatih Terim took over. Despite changing the manager during the season, the club managed to win the 2017–2018 Süper Lig. Galatasaray won the treble in the 2018–19 season, winning Süper Lig, Turkish Cup and Süper Kupa. It was the seventh double for the club and the first one after four years.

== Players ==
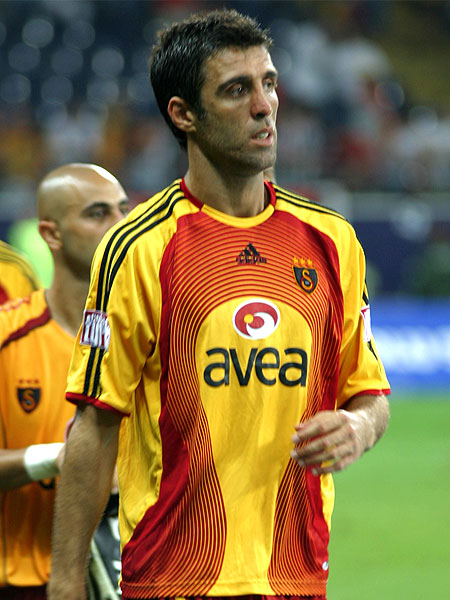
Hakan Şükür

There are many successful footballers who have played for Galatasaray and made their mark on Turkish football history. Few examples may be 1930s national hero Eşfak Aykaç, Boduri who died at the age of 21, Mehmet Leblebi who scored a domestic record of fourteen goals in single match, Gündüz Kılıç nicknamed Baba (father) who was the coach but also the player of his team in the 1950s with great success on both, Bülent-Reha Eken brothers, Suat Mamat who made a hat-trick in 1954 FIFA World Cup, Coşkun Özarı a life devoted to Galatasaray, Turgay Şeren the heroic goalkeeper that called "the Panther of Berlin", Fatih Terim the team captain of Galatasaray and the Turkey national football team for years and the current coach, Metin Oktay six time top scorer of Turkish league, Zoran Simović another skilled goalkeeper known for his penalty saves, Cüneyt Tanman who played a record of 342 games for Galatasaray, Tanju Çolak a goalscorer and European Golden Boot 1988 winner with Galatasaray, Dževad Prekazi a Yugoslav teammate of Tanju specializing in free kicks, Taffarel the world cup winner goalkeeper of Brazil, Gheorghe Hagi Romanian football hero that still described as the best foreign player ever to play in Turkey, and, Hakan Şükür, who scored most goals in top flight Turkish Football with 249 goals spent the majority of his career, 14 years, at Galatasaray and is also the club's most scoring player with 228 goals.
