= 1910–11 Galatasaray S.K. season =

Galatasaray
1910–11 season
- President: Ali Sami Yen
- Manager: Horace Armitage
- Stadium: Papazın Çayırı
- Istanbul Lig: 1st
Home colours

The 1910–11 season was Galatasaray SK's 7th in existence and the club's 5th consecutive season in the IFL. Galatasaray won the league for the third time.

== Squad statistics ==
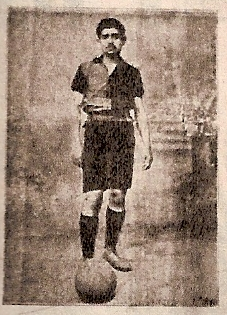
Hasan Basri Bütün - September 1910

| No. | Pos. | Name | IFL | | Total | |
| No. | Pos. | Name | Apps | Goals | Apps | Goals |
|---|---|---|---|---|---|---|
| - | GK | (Turkey) Ahmet Robenson | 0 | 0 | 0 | 0 |
| - | DF | (Socialist Federal Republic of Yugoslavia) Milo Bakic | 0 | 0 | 0 | 0 |
| - | DF | (Turkey) Neşet | 0 | 0 | 0 | 0 |
| - | MF | (England) Paul Balcheff | 0 | 0 | 0 | 0 |
| - | DF | (Turkey) Celal İbrahim | 0 | 0 | 0 | 0 |
| - | FW | (Turkey) Emin Bülent Serdaroğlu | 0 | 0 | 0 | 0 |
| - | MF | (Turkey) Sabri Mahir | 0 | 0 | 0 | 0 |
| - | MF | (Turkey) Bekir Sıtkı Bircan | 0 | 0 | 0 | 0 |
| - | MF | (Turkey) Hasan Basri Bütün | 0 | 0 | 0 | 0 |
| - | FW | (England) Horace Armitage(C) | 0 | 0 | 0 | 0 |
| - | FW | (Turkey) Fuat Hüsnü Kayacan | 0 | 0 | 0 | 0 |
| - | FW | (Turkey) İdris | 0 | 0 | 0 | 0 |
| - | FW | (England) Cyrill Doupkoff | 0 | 0 | 0 | 0 |
| - | FW | (Turkey) Cyrill Stelyo | 0 | 0 | 0 | 0 |
| - | FW | (England) Clerk Comber | 0 | 0 | 0 | 0 |
| - | FW | (England) Highton | 0 | 0 | 0 | 0 |

== Competitions ==
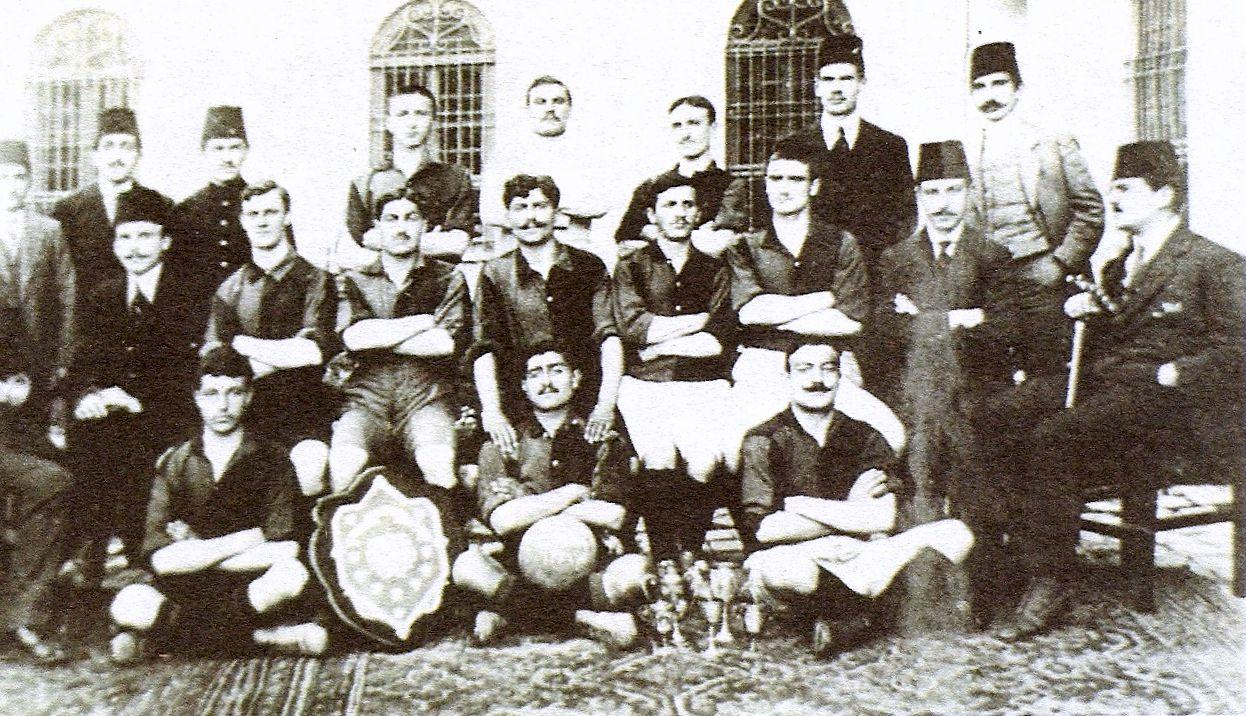
Istanbul Sunday League - Galatasaray SK 1910-11 Champion

=== Istanbul Football League ===
==== Classification ====
| Pos | Team | Pld | W | D | L | GF | GA | GD | Pts |
|---|---|---|---|---|---|---|---|---|---|
| 1 | Galatasaray SK | 8 | 8 | 0 | 0 | 29 | 2 | +27 | 16 |
| 2 | Progress FC | 8 | 4 | 0 | 4 | 10 | 18 | −8 | 8 |
| 3 | Cadi-Keuy FC | 7 | 2 | 1 | 4 | 6 | 4 | +2 | 5 |
| 4 | Strugglers FC | 6 | 1 | 2 | 3 | 6 | 7 | −1 | 4 |
| 5 | Fenerbahçe SK | 7 | 1 | 1 | 5 | 3 | 23 | −20 | 3 |

==== Matches ====
Kick-off listed in local time (EEST)

4 December 1910

| Galatasaray SK | 5 – 0 | Fenerbahçe SK |
|---|---|---|
| Rowland Rees (2); Fuat Hüsnü Kayacan(2); Celal İbrahim | (Report) |

Union Club Field, Istanbul
Referee: Unknown

12 February 1911

| Galatasaray SK | 7 – 0 | Fenerbahçe SK |
|---|---|---|
| | Galatasaray S.K. 7-0 Fenerbahçe S.K click for details |

Union Club Field, Istanbul
Referee: Unknown

| Galatasaray SK | 3 – 1 | Progress FC |

Union Club Field, Istanbul
Referee: Unknown

| Galatasaray SK | 8 – 1 | Progress FC |

Union Club Field, Istanbul
Referee: Unknown

| Galatasaray SK | 3 – 0 | Strugglers FC |
|---|---|---|
| | Won By Decision |

Union Club Field, Istanbul
Referee: Unknown

| Galatasaray SK | 3 – 0 | Cadi-Keuy FC |
|---|---|---|
| | Won By Decision |

Union Club Field, Istanbul
Referee: Unknown

=== Friendly Matches ===
October 9, 1910
15:00

| Galatasaray SK | 0– 2 | Strugglers FC |
|---|---|---|
| | (Report) |

Union Club Field, Istanbul
Referee: Unknown

Galatasaray SK:
| GK | 1 | (Turkey) Ahmet Robenson (c) |
| RB | 2 | (Turkey) Dalaklı Hüseyin |
| CB | 3 | (Turkey) Todor Bojkov |
| CB | 4 | (Turkey) Hasan |
| LB | 5 | (Turkey) Bekir Sıtkı Bircan |
| RM | 6 | (Turkey) Steryo |
| CM | 7 | (Turkey) Highton |
| CM | 8 | (Turkey) Celal İbrahim |
| FW | 9 | (Turkey) Fuat Hüsnü Kayacan |
| FW | 10 | (Turkey) Emin Bülent Serdaroğlu |
| FW | 11 | (England) Rowland Rees |
Substitutes:
Manager:
(Turkey) Hasan Bey

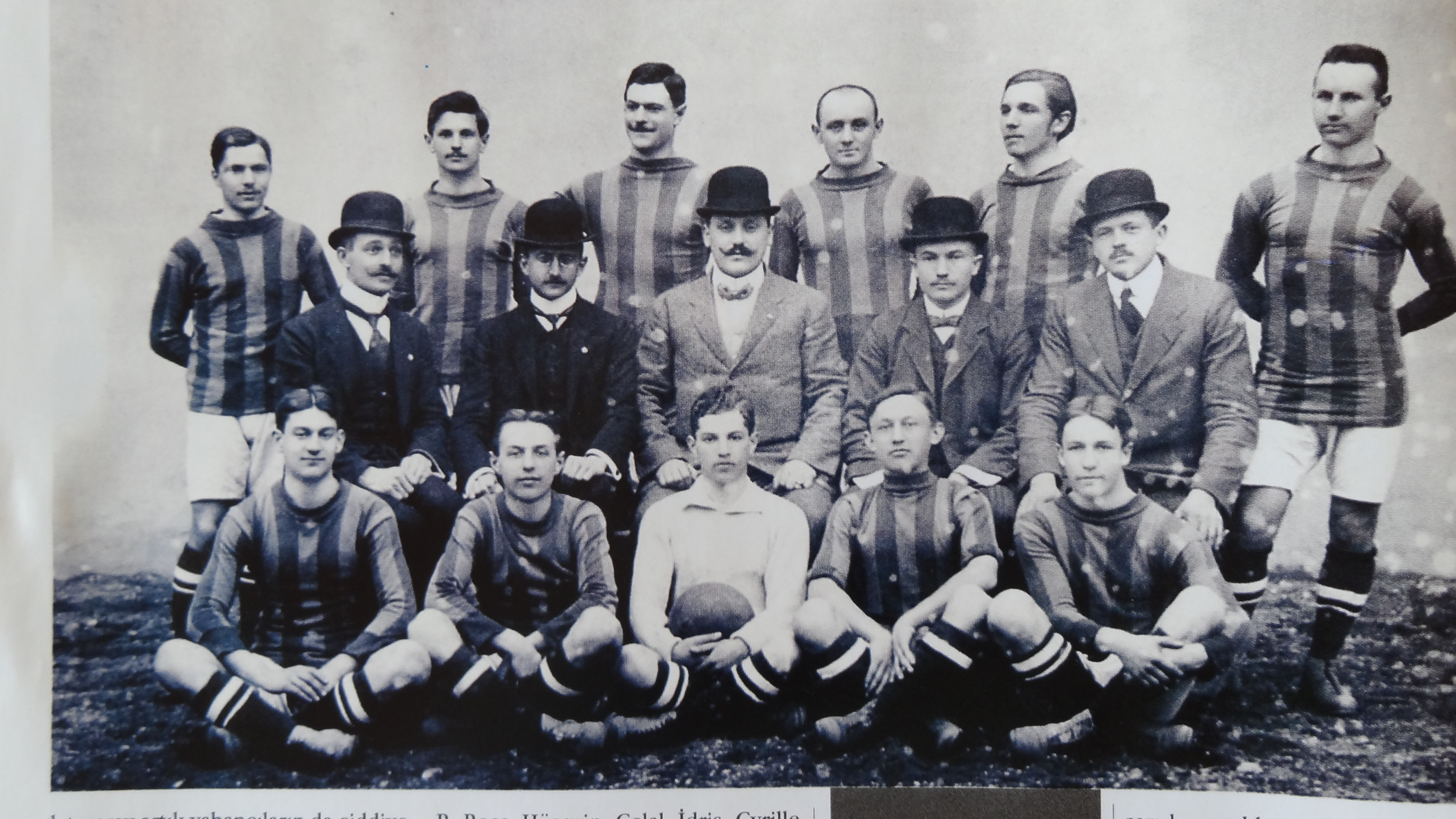
Kolozsvári Vasutas Sport Club, 1911

April 1, 1911

| Galatasaray SK | 2 – 2 | Kolozsvári Vasutas Sport Club |

Union Club Field, Istanbul
Referee: Unknown

Galatasaray SK:
| GK | 1 | (Turkey) Ahmet Robenson (c) |
| RB | 2 | (Turkey) Neşet |
| CB | 3 | (Turkey) Bojkov |
| CB | 4 | (Turkey) Hasan |
| LB | 5 | (Turkey) Bekir Sıtkı Bircan |
| RM | 6 | (Turkey) Dalaklı Hüseyin |
| CM | 7 | (Turkey) İdris |
| CM | 8 | (Turkey) Celal İbrahim |
| FW | 9 | (Turkey) Fuat Hüsnü Kayacan |
| FW | 10 | (Turkey) Emin Bülent Serdaroğlu |
| FW | 11 | (England) Rowland Rees |
Substitutes:
Manager:
(Turkey) Emin Bülent Serdaroğlu

April 3, 1911

| Galatasaray SK | 4 – 2 | Kolozsvári Vasutas Sport Club |

Union Club Field, Istanbul
Referee: Unknown

Galatasaray SK:
| GK | 1 | (Turkey) Ahmet Robenson (c) |
| RB | 2 | (Turkey) Neşet |
| CB | 3 | (Turkey) Bojkov |
| CB | 4 | (Turkey) Ahmet Cevat |
| LB | 5 | (Turkey) Bekir Sıtkı Bircan |
| RM | 6 | (Turkey) Dalaklı Hüseyin |
| CM | 7 | (Turkey) İdris |
| CM | 8 | (Turkey) Celal İbrahim |
| FW | 9 | (England) Cyrielle |
| FW | 10 | (Turkey) Hasan |
| FW | 11 | (England) Rowland Rees |
Substitutes:
Manager:
(Turkey) Emin Bülent Serdaroğlu
