= 1905–06 Galatasaray S.K. season =

Galatasaray SK
1905–06 season
- President: Ali Sami Yen
- Manager: Boris Nikolof
- Stadium: Papazın Çayırı
Home colours

The 1905–06 season was Galatasaray SK's 2nd in existence. Galatasaray SK did not join the IFL.

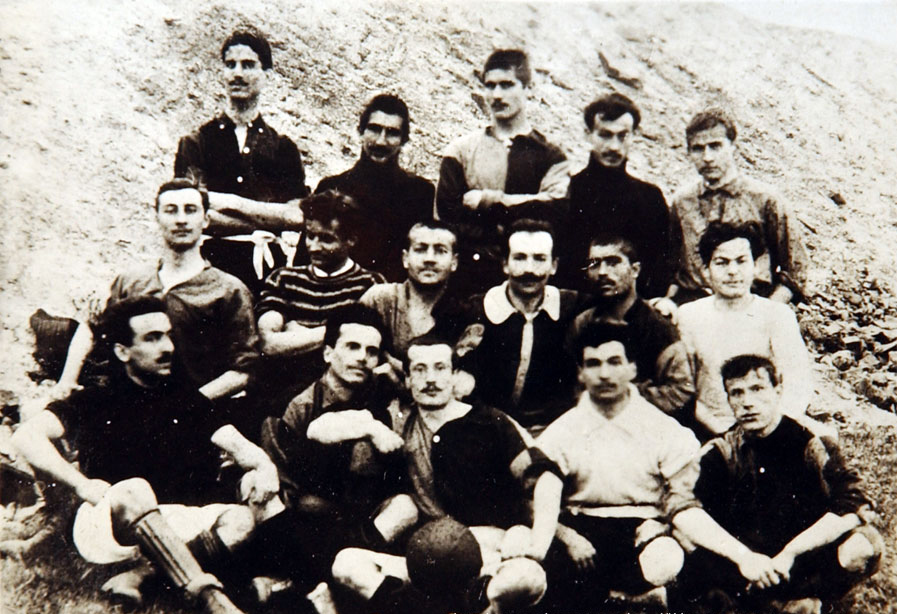

== Squad statistics ==
No.	Pos.	Name	IFL		Total	
No.	Pos.	Name	Apps	Goals	Apps	Goals
-	GK	(Ottoman Empire) Asım Tevfik Sonumut	0	0	0	0
-	GK	(Ottoman Empire) Ahmet Robenson	0	0	0	0
-	DF	(Kingdom of Serbia) Milo Bakic	0	0	0	0
-	DF	(Ottoman Empire) Refik Cevdet Kalpakçıoğlu	0	0	0	0
-	MF	(Ottoman Empire) Tahsin Nahit	0	0	0	0
-	MF	(Ottoman Empire) Bekir Sıtkı Bircan	0	0	0	0
-	MF	(Ottoman Empire) Celal İbrahim	0	0	0	0
-	MF	(Bulgaria) Boris Nikolof(C)	0	0	0	0
-	MF	(Ottoman Empire) Ali Sami Yen	0	0	0	0
-	FW	(Ottoman Empire) Kamil Soysal	0	0	0	0
-	FW	(Ottoman Empire) Abidin Daver	0	0	0	0
-	FW	(Kingdom of Serbia) Paul Bakic	0	0	0	0
-	FW	(Ottoman Empire) Ali Müsait	0	0	0	0
-	FW	(Ottoman Empire) Emin Bülent Serdaroğlu	0	0	0	0
-	FW	(Ottoman Empire) Reşat Şirvani	0	0	0	0

== Friendly Matches ==
Kick-off listed in local time (EEST) Kick-off listed in local time (EEST)

1905

Galatasaray SK	0 – 11	Cadi-Keuy FC
	[ (Report)]

Union Club Field, Istanbul
Referee: Unknown

1905

Galatasaray SK	0 – 7	Cadi-Keuy FC
	[ (Report)]

Union Club Field, Istanbul
Referee: Unknown

1905

Galatasaray SK	4 – 6	Cadi-Keuy FC
	[ (Report)]

Union Club Field, Istanbul
Referee: Unknown

1905

Galatasaray SK	1 – 2	Cadi-Keuy FC
	[ (Report)]

Union Club Field, Istanbul
Referee: Unknown

1905

Galatasaray SK	0 – 0	Cadi-Keuy FC
	[ (Report)]

Union Club Field, Istanbul
Referee: Unknown

1905

Galatasaray SK	0 – 12	Tatavla Heraklis
	[ (Report)]

Union Club Field, Istanbul
Referee: Unknown
