= Rumblers F.C. =

Turkish football club

Rumblers FC
- Full name: Rumblers Football Club
- Founded: 1911
- Dissolved: 1915
- Ground: Papazın Çayırı
Home colours

Rumblers FC was a club founded by Greeks footballers derived from Elpis FC and Englishmen from Moda FC in Constantinople, Ottoman Empire in 1911. The colours of the club were blue and white as in the Greek flag and the same like former club Elpis FC.

== History ==
Elpis FC was founded in 1904 in Kadıköy district of Constantinople by the local Greeks and the team was completely made up by Greek footballers. while Moda FC was founded by Englishmen in the same neighborhood. After Elpis FC was forced to cease operations by Turkish authorities, its players formed a new club under an English name, being the continuation of Elpis FC sporting the same colours. The club finished second in their first season, in the 1911-12 Constantinople Football League. The 1912-13 season was not concluded due to the Balkan Wars.

It was considered a Greek club, having the support of the local Greek fans (mostly the ones who previously cheered for Elpis FC). It was quite possible that the name Rumblers had a secret reference to the club's Greek heritage, as the Greeks of Constantinople were known as Rum. After 1914 and the WW I no Greek or English clubs played in the Constantinople Football League and the club was forced to fold. They played 3 seasons in the Constantinople Football League, recording two second places, while one season was not concluded.

Rumblers have also been mentioned falsely as Rovers.

== Honours ==
- Constantinople Football League:
  - Runners-Up: 1911–1912, 1913–14

== See also ==
- List of Turkish Sports Clubs by Foundation Dates

== External lniks ==
- Turkey - İstanbul League 1904-1918 at rsssf.org
- Fenerbahçe vs Rumblers FC at macanilari.com
