= 1911–12 Istanbul Football League =

İstanbul Football League
- Season: 1911–12
- Champions: Fenerbahçe (1st title)
- Matches: 40
- Goals: 48 (1.2 per match)

The 1911–12 İstanbul Football League season was the 8th season of the league. Fenerbahçe won the league for the first time. Galatasaray protested Istanbul League Organization' s decision regarding Adnan İbrahim Pirioglu's penalty and did not join the league.

Fenerbahçe, which developed and strengthened its squad with new young players, became champions without being defeated. The most important aspect of this season was that with Fenerbahçe being champions, the championship streak of English and Greek teams completely ended, and from this date on, only Turkish teams became champions in the Istanbul Football League.

NB: 3-2-1 point system.

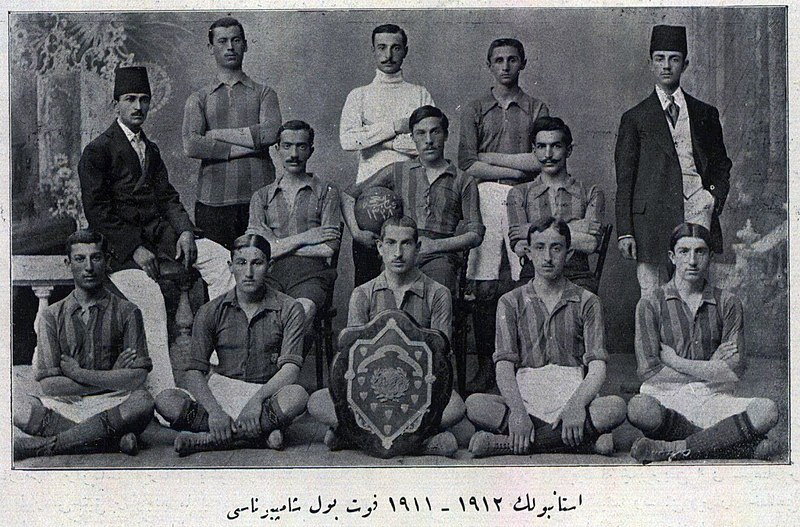
Istanbul Sunday League -Fenerbahçe SK 1911-12 Champion

== Season ==
Pos	Team	Pld	W	D	L	GF	GA	GD	Pts
1	Fenerbahçe SK	8	5	3	0	16	5	+11	21
2	Rumblers FC	8	4	3	1	18	9	+9	19
3	Strugglers FC	8	4	2	2	13	8	+5	18
4	Progress FC	8	1	1	6	10	20	−10	11
5	Cadi-Keuy FC	8	1	0	7	6	21	−15	10

== Matches ==
29 October 1911, Fenerbahçe SK - Cadi-Keuy FC: 3-1
9 November 1911, Fenerbahçe SK - Rumblers FC: 2-2
24 December 1911, Fenerbahçe SK - Progress FC: 2-0
21 January 1912, Fenerbahçe SK - Strugglers FC: 0-0
2 February 1912, Fenerbahçe SK - Cadi-Keuy FC: 4-0
25 February 1912, Fenerbahçe SK - Rumblers FC: 1-1
17 March 1912, Fenerbahçe SK - Progress FC: 3-1
31 March 1912, Fenerbahçe SK - Strugglers FC: 1-0 (goal:Sait Selahattin Cihanoğlu min. 82)
