= List of Turkish sports clubs by foundation dates =

== Football ==
Football was introduced to the Ottoman Empire by English men living in the area. The first matches took place in Selanik, now known as Thessaloniki, in 1875. F.C. Smyrna was the first football club established in Turkey. The same men brought football from İzmir to Istanbul in 1895. The first competitive matches between İzmir and Istanbul clubs took place in 1897, 1898, 1899, and 1904. The İzmir team won every match.

Year	Home town	Club	Notes
1877	Istanbul	Hermes AC	Renamed Pera club. Many members moved to Greece and established AEK Athens and P.A.O.K.
1890	Izmir	Orpheus MSC	moved 1922 to Athens, Greece, as Panionios G.S.S.
1891	Izmir	Apollon Smyrnis	moved 1922 to Athens, Greece, as GS Apollon Smyrnis
1894	Izmir	Smyrna FC	Dissolved
1896	Istanbul	Kurtuluş SK	Founded as "Tatavla Heraklis" (Dissolved)
1901	Istanbul	Black Stockings FC	Dissolved 1901
1902	Istanbul	Cadi-Keuy FC	Dissolved 1912
1903	Istanbul	Moda FC	Dissolved 1910
1903	Istanbul	Beşiktaş JK	Football section in 1911
1904	Istanbul	Elpis FC	Dissolved 1910
1904	Istanbul	HMS Imogene FC	Dissolved 1909
1905	Istanbul	Galatasaray SK	Founded in Galatasaray High School.
1907	Istanbul	Fenerbahçe SK	Founded in Fenerbahçe Cape
1908	Istanbul	Üsküdar Anadolu SK	
1908	Istanbul	Beykoz 1908 S.K.D.	
1908	Istanbul	Vefa SK	
1908	Istanbul	Union Club FC	Dissolved
1908	Istanbul	Strugglers FC	Dissolved 1913
1909	Istanbul	Altınordu İdman Yurdu SK	Founded as Galatasaray B team under the name Progres FC. Changed name in 1914. Dissolved 1926
1910	Ankara	MKE Ankaragücü SK	Founded in istanbul and moved to Ankara in 1920
1910	Istanbul	Armstrong-Vickers FC	Dissolved 1914
1910	Istanbul	Türk İdman Ocağı SK	Dissolved 1915
1911	Istanbul	Rumblers FC	Dissolved
1911	Istanbul	Küçükçekmece SK	Founded as Süleymaniye Sirkeci
1911	Istanbul	Beylerbeyi SK	
1912	Istanbul	Hilal SK	
1912	Izmir	Karşıyaka SK	
1912	Istanbul	Telefoncular FC	Dissolved 1914
1913	Istanbul	Anadolu Hisarı İdman Yurdu SK	
1913	Istanbul	Türk Gücü SK	13 March 1913
1913	Istanbul	OSG Maccabi	Dissolved late 1930s
1914	Izmir	Altay SK	
1914	Istanbul	Nişantaşı SK	
1914	Istanbul	Darüşşafaka SK	
1915	Izmir	İzmir İdman Yurdu SK	
1915	Istanbul	Züntürum Sport	
1919	Istanbul	Eyüpspor	
1919	Ankara	Muhafızgücü	
1921	Istanbul	Kasımpaşa SK	Founded as Altıntuğ
1922	Konya	Konyaspor	Founded as Konya Gençlerbirliği
1923	Istanbul	Beyoğluspor	Founded as Pera Sports Club
1923	Izmir	İzmirspor	Founded as Altinay on 25 July 1923
1923	Ankara	Gençlerbirliği S.K.	
1923	Samsun	Çarşambaspor	
1923	Izmir	Altınordu	Founded on 26 December 1923.
1924	Bursa	Mudanyaspor	
1925	Izmir	Göztepe S.K.	Founded on 14 June 1925.
1925	Mersin	Mersin İdman Yurdu Su.K.	Founded on 16 August 1925
1926	Bitlis	Özgüzeldere S.K.	
1926	Istanbul	İstanbulspor A.Ş.	Founded on July 23, 1913 as Makriköy İdman Yurdu, changed name to İstanbul Spor Kulübü in 1925 and merged with Istanbul High School in 1926.
1926	Istanbul	Fatih Karagümrük SK	Founded as Karagümrük İdman Yurdu
1926	Giresun	Bulancakspor	
1927	Istanbul	Feriköy SK	
1927	Samsun	Samsunspor	The team started professional football activities in 1965
1928	Izmir	Bucaspor	
1930	Ankara	Ankara Demirspor	
1930	Eskişehir	Eskişehir Demirspor	
1930	Samsun	1930 Bafraspor	Founded as Bafra Belediyespor
