= Bekir Sıtkı Bircan =

Turkish footballer (1886–1967)

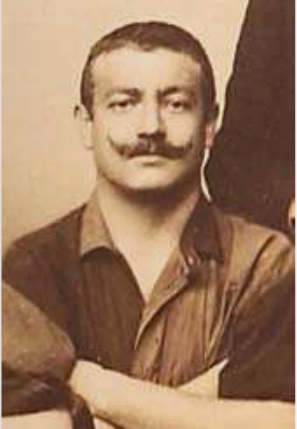

Personal information
- Full name: Bekir Sıtkı Bircan
- Date of birth: 1886
- Place of birth: Istanbul, Ottoman Empire
- Date of death: 26 June 1967 (aged 83)
- Place of death: İstanbul, Turkey
- Position: Left wing-back

Senior career*
Years	Team	Apps	(Gls)
1905–1915	Galatasaray SK		
- * Club domestic league appearances and goals

Bekir Sıtkı Bircan (1886 – 26 June 1967) was a Turkish footballer, high school teacher and one of the founders of Galatasaray SK. He spent the entirety of his career with his hometown club.

== Honours ==
Galatasaray

- Istanbul Football League: 1908–09, 1909–10, 1910–11
