= Boris Nikolov (footballer) =

Bulgarian footballer and manager

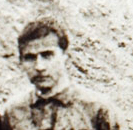

Senior career*
Years	Team	Apps	(Gls)
1905–1912	Galatasaray		

Managerial career
- 1905–1907: Galatasaray
- * Club domestic league appearances and goals

Boris Nikolov or Boris Nikolof (Bulgarian: Борис Николов), nicknamed The Bear (Мечката, Mechkata), was a Bulgarian football player and manager. In the inceptive years of leading Turkish (then Ottoman) football club Galatasaray S.K., which he co-founded, Nikolov was both the club's first manager and first captain.

== Career ==
In autumn 1905, Nikolov was, along with Ali Sami Yen, among the thirteen founders of Galatasaray. In Galatasaray's all-time debut game, against Cadi-Keuy FC, Nikolov scored a goal for Galatasaray's 2–0 victory. Nikolov's height and strength led to him receiving the nickname The Bear. As player-manager, Nikolov also took part in Galatasaray's first league game of the 1906–07 Istanbul Football League, against HMS Imogene FC. Nikolov scored Galatasaray's only goal in a 1–1 draw.

Out of nationalist concerns, the name of Nikolov had been erased from the official list of founders of Galatasaray as the Balkan Wars commenced in 1912, along with the names of several other non-Turkish founders. However, the original list with Nikolov's name on it was reinstated after the foundation of the modern Republic of Turkey by Mustafa Kemal Atatürk in 1923.

The signature of one Boris Nikolov stands on the second copy of Bulgarian football club PFC Slavia Sofia's record of foundation from the early 1930s, reconfirming the club's original establishment in 1913. An article from the Bulgarian-language sports portal Sportal.bg theorizes about this Boris Nikolov being the same person as the co-founder, first manager and first captain of Galatasaray. The article recognizes the lack of any further evidence, other than the fact that multiple Bulgarian footballers returned to that country from Istanbul as the Balkan Wars began and were members of the pioneering football teams of Sofia.
