= 1904–05 Istanbul Football League =

İstanbul Football League
- Season: 1904–05
- Champions: HMS Imogene FC (1st title)
- Matches: ?

The 1904–05 İstanbul Football League season was the first season of the league. HMS Imogene FC won the league for the first time.

== Season ==
Pos	Team	Pld	W	D	L	GF	GA	GD	Pts
1	HMS Imogene FC	0	?	?	?	?	?	—	0
2	Moda FC	0	?	?	?	?	?	—	0
3	Cadi-Keuy FC	0	?	?	?	?	?	—	0
4	Elpis FC	0	?	?	?	?	?	—	0
