= 1909–10 Istanbul Football League =

İstanbul Football League
- Season: 1909–10
- Champions: Galatasaray (2nd title)

The 1909–10 İstanbul Football League season was the 6th season of the league. Galatasaray won the league for the second time.

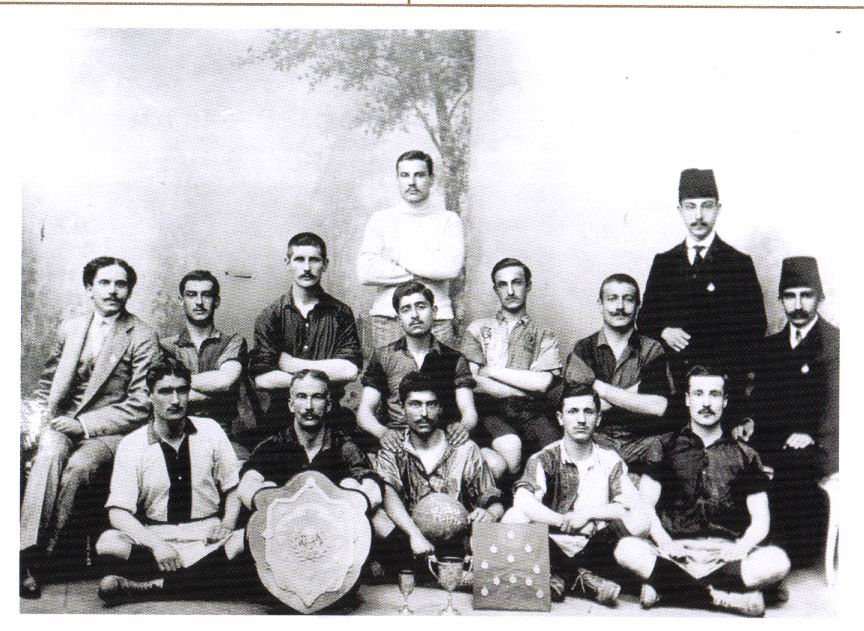
Istanbul Sunday League - Galatasaray SK 1909-10 Champion

== Season ==
Pos	Team	Pld	W	D	L	GF	GA	GD	Pts
1	Galatasaray	7	7	0	0	24	2	+22	14
2	Strugglers FC	0	?	?	?	?	?	—	0
3	Moda FC	0	?	?	?	?	?	—	0
4	Cadi-Keuy FC	0	?	?	?	?	?	—	0
5	Fenerbahçe SK	2	0	0	2	0	6	−6	0
6	Elpis FC	0	?	?	?	?	?	—	0

== Matches ==
Galatasaray - Strugglers FC: 5-1
Galatasaray - Strugglers FC: 4-1
Galatasaray - Fenerbahçe SK: 3-0
Galatasaray - Moda FC: 2-0
Galatasaray - Moda FC: 8-0
Galatasaray - Cadi-Keuy FC: 1-0
Galatasaray - Elpis FC: 1-0
Fenerbahçe SK - Strugglers FC: 0-3
