= Moda F.C. =

Moda FC
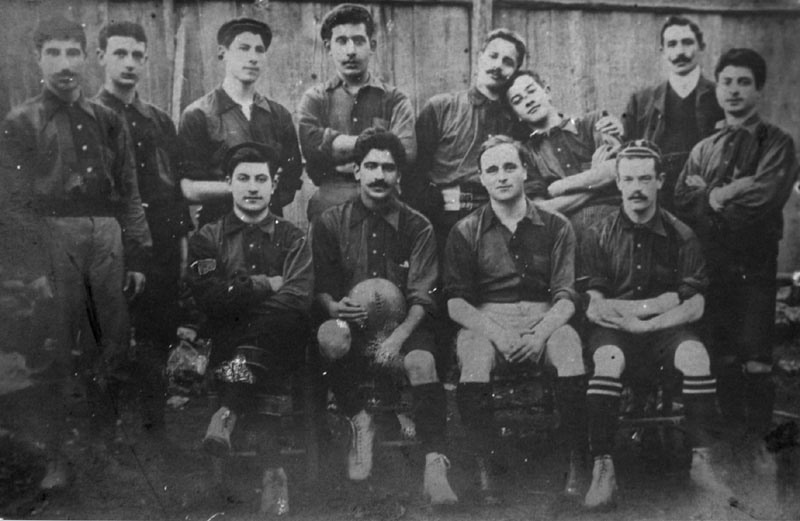
- Full name: Moda Football Club
- Founded: 1903
- Dissolved: 1910
- Ground: Papazın Çayırı
Home colours

Moda FC is a defunct sports club based in Constantinople, Ottoman Empire.

== History ==
The club which was founded by Englishmen in 1903 and was active until 1910. They won the Constantinople title in 1908.

Τhe club's biggest rival was Cadi-Keuy F.C. and it was considered Constantinople's early crosstown derby.

== Honours ==
- Istanbul Football League:
  - Winners: 1907–08

== League tables ==
- Istanbul Football League:

- 1904–05 Istanbul Football League:
  1) HMS Imogene FC
  2) Moda FC
  3) Cadi-Keuy FC
  4) Elpis FC
- 1905–06 Istanbul Football League:
  1) Cadi-Keuy FC
  2) HMS Imogene FC
  3) Moda FC
  4) Elpis FC
- 1906–07 Istanbul Football League:
  1) Cadi-Keuy FC
  2) Moda FC
  3) HMS Imogene FC
  4) Galatasaray SK
  5) Elpis FC
- 1907–08 Istanbul Football League:
  1) Moda FC
  2) Cadi-Keuy FC
  3) Galatasaray SK
  4) Elpis FC
  5) HMS Imogene FC
- 1908–09 Istanbul Football League:
  1) Galatasaray SK
  2) Moda FC
  3) HMS Imogene FC
  4) Cadi-Keuy FC
- 1909–10 Istanbul Football League:
  1) Galatasaray SK
  2) Strugglers FC
  3) Moda FC
  4) Cadi-Keuy FC
  5) Fenerbahçe SK

== Matches ==
- November 1906: Galatasaray – Moda FC: 1–1
- 19 January 1910: Fenerbahçe SK – Moda FC: 1–2
- 1910: Galatasaray – Moda FC: 2–0
- 1910: Galatasaray – Moda FC: 8–0
- 1906: Cadi-Keuy FC – Moda FC: 0–5

== See also ==
- List of Turkish Sports Clubs by Foundation Dates

== Sources ==
- Tuncay, Bülent (2002). Galatasaray Tarihi. Yapı Kredi Yayınları ISBN 975-08-0454-6
- Dağlaroğlu, Rüştü. Fenerbahçe Spor Kulübü Tarihi 1907–1957
- Moda Futbol Kulübü. Türk Futbol Tarihi vol.1. page(22). (June 1992) Türkiye Futbol Federasyonu Yayınları.
