= 1905–06 Istanbul Football League =

İstanbul Football League
- Season: 1905–06
- Champions: Cadi-Keuy FC (1st title)
- Matches: 24
- Goals: 32 (1.33 per match)

The 1905–06 İstanbul Football League season was the second season of the league. Cadi-Keuy FC won the league for the first time.

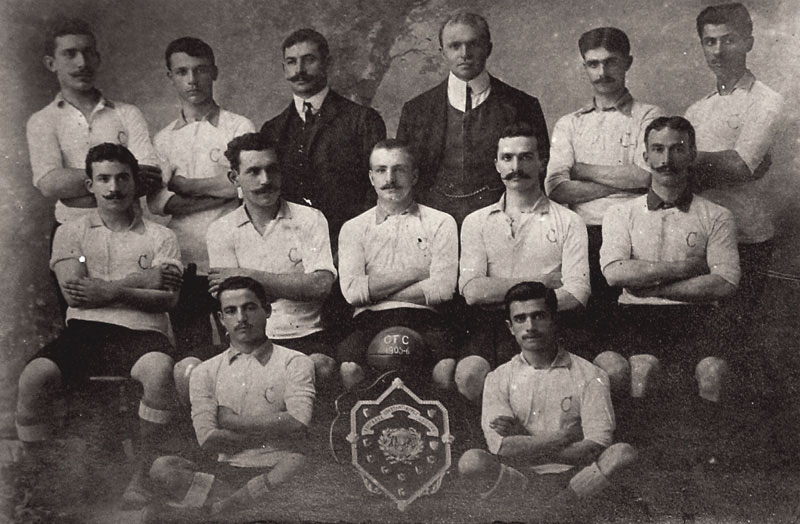
Istanbul Sunday League - Cadikeuy Football Club 1905-06 Champion

== Season ==
Pos	Team	Pld	W	D	L	GF	GA	GD	Pts
1	Cadi-Keuy FC	6	6	0	0	18	3	+15	12
2	HMS Imogene FC	6	?	?	?	11	7	+4	10
3	Moda FC	6	?	?	?	2	9	−7	2
4	Elpis FC	6	0	0	6	1	13	−12	0
