= Ahmet Robenson =

Association football player (1886–1968)

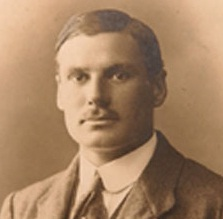

Personal information
- Date of birth: 1889
- Place of birth: Kalimpong, British Raj
- Date of death: 1 January 1968 (aged 79)
- Place of death: New York, United States
- Position: Goalkeeper

Senior career*
Years	Team	Apps	(Gls)
1905–1915	Galatasaray SK		
- * Club domestic league appearances and goals

Ahmet Robenson (born Peel Harold Robinson; 1889 – 1 January 1968) was an English-Turkish football player and physical education teacher at Galatasaray High School, who is known for his active role in the development of sports in Turkey.

== Biography ==
Robenson was born in Kalimpong, British India (modern-day India), to English parents, Spencer Robinson and Hannah Rodda. After Spencer Robinson’s death, his mother remarried a Muslim man and converted to Islam; her children’s names were subsequently changed to Islamic names. Robenson moved to Istanbul with his mother and stepfather in 1891. He lived in Istanbul until 1929, then emigrated to the United States, where he died in New York in 1968.

His brothers, Yakup and Abdurrahman, were killed in action in World War I whilst fighting for the Ottomans against the British in the Sinai front.

After graduating from Galatasaray High School, Robenson was interested in new sports which were not recognized in his country at the time. He is known as being the first organizer of basketball, hockey, tennis, and scouting activities in his time. He introduced these new sports to his students in Galatasaray High School.

Robenson also served the goalkeeper of the Galatasaray football team, and later became its president in 1926.

== Scouting ==
The start of Scouting in Turkey is attributed to brothers Ahmet and Abdurrahman Robenson, who were sports teachers at the Galatasaray and Istanbul high schools in Istanbul in 1912, and to Nafi Arif Kansu and Ethem Nejat, with the first units organized at Darüşşafaka, Galatasaray, and İstanbul high schools, during the late Ottoman period.

== Honours ==
Galatasaray

- Istanbul Football League: 1908–1909, 1909–1910, 1910–1911

== See also ==
- List of one-club men
- List of Galatasaray S.K. presidents

Sporting positions
Preceded by Ali Sami Yen	President of Galatasaray SK; 17 Jul 1925 – 5 Sep 1925	Succeeded by Ali Haydar Şekip
