= List of Galatasaray S.K. managers =

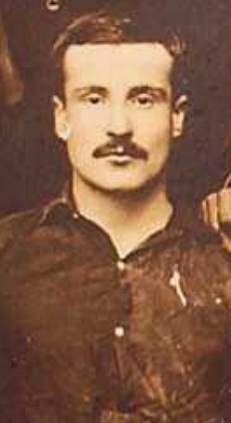
Emin Bülent Serdaroğlu, the first Turkish manager of the club

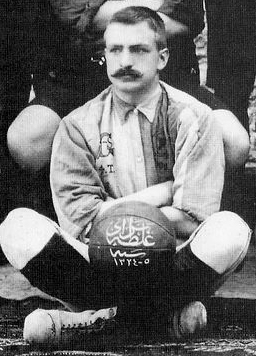
Horace Armitage, the first manager to win a trophy

Galatasaray Spor Kulübü is a Turkish professional football club based in Istanbul, Turkey, who currently play in Süper Lig. This chronological list comprises all those who have held the position of head coach or technical director of the first team of Galatasaray SK since their foundation in 1905. Caretaker managers (interim) are included, as well as those who have been in permanent charge.

The first full-time manager for Galatasaray SK was Boris Nikolof, one of the founders of Galatasaray SK.

The most successful Galatasaray SK manager in terms of trophies won is Fatih Terim, who won eight Süper Lig titles, three Türkiye Kupası trophies, five Süper Kupa, three TSYD Cup and one UEFA Europa League Cup (20 trophies in total) in his 10-year reign as manager.

== Statistics ==
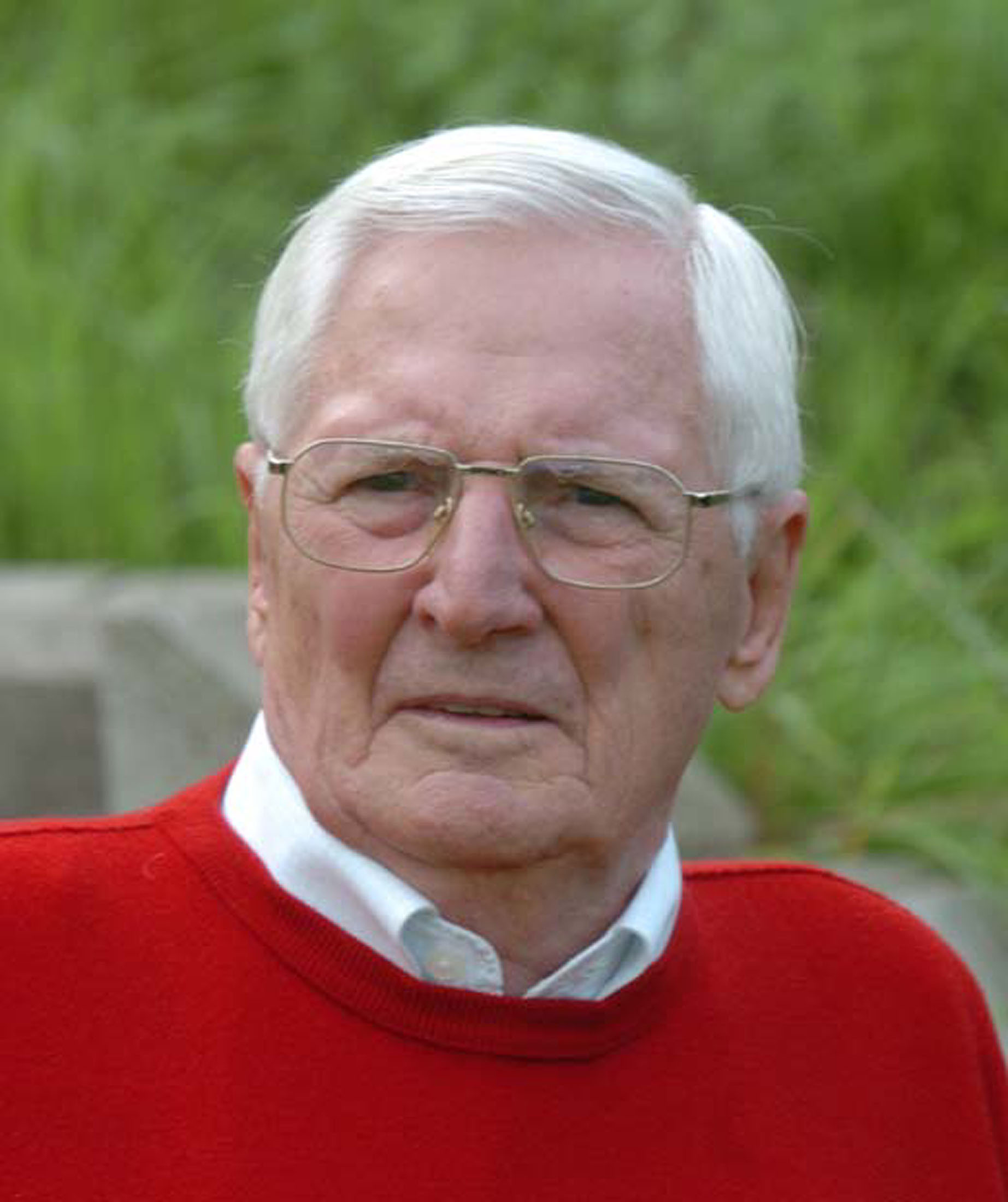
Jupp Derwall (1984–87)

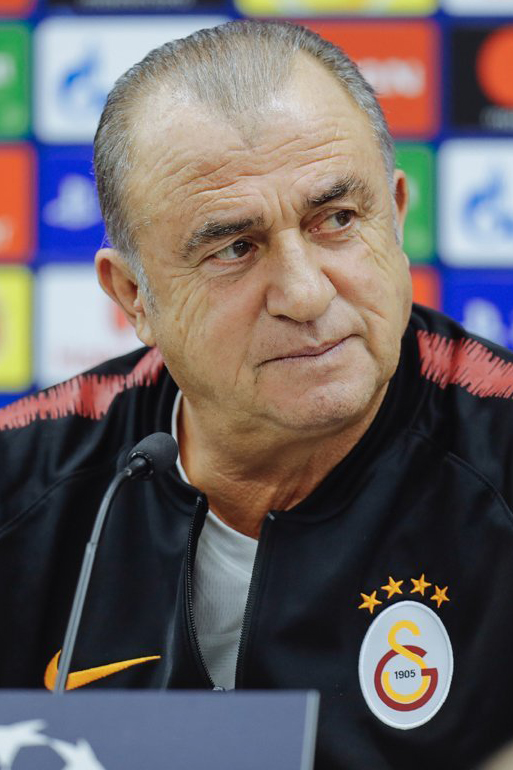
Fatih Terim, winning manager of the 1999–2000 UEFA Cup

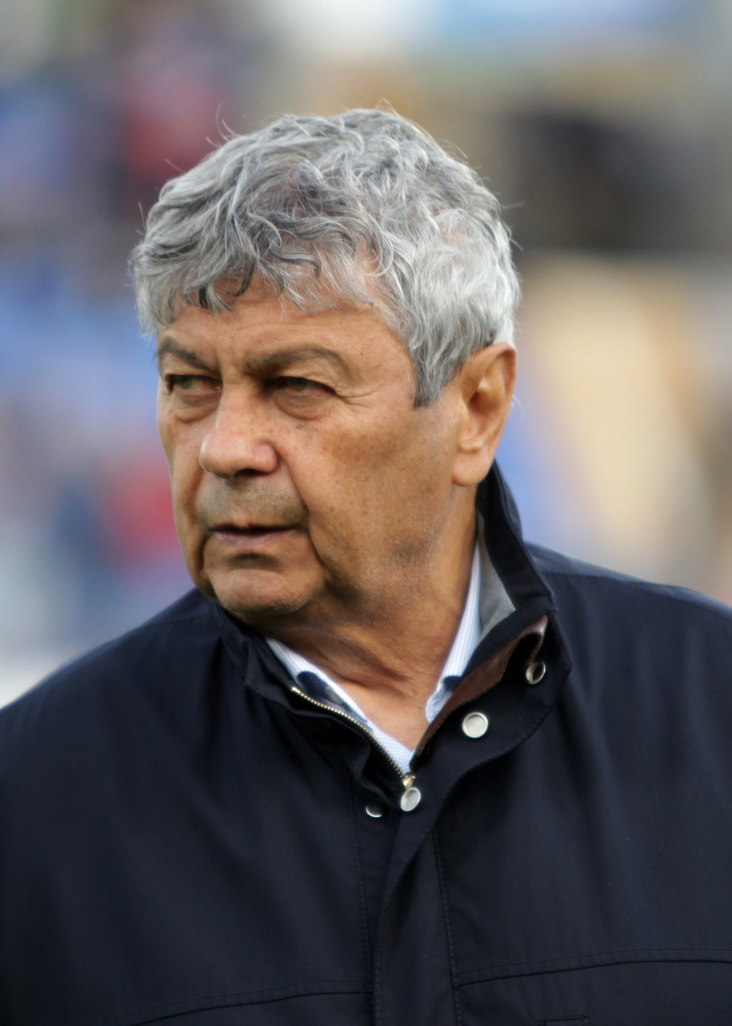
Mircea Lucescu, winning manager of the 2000 UEFA Super Cup

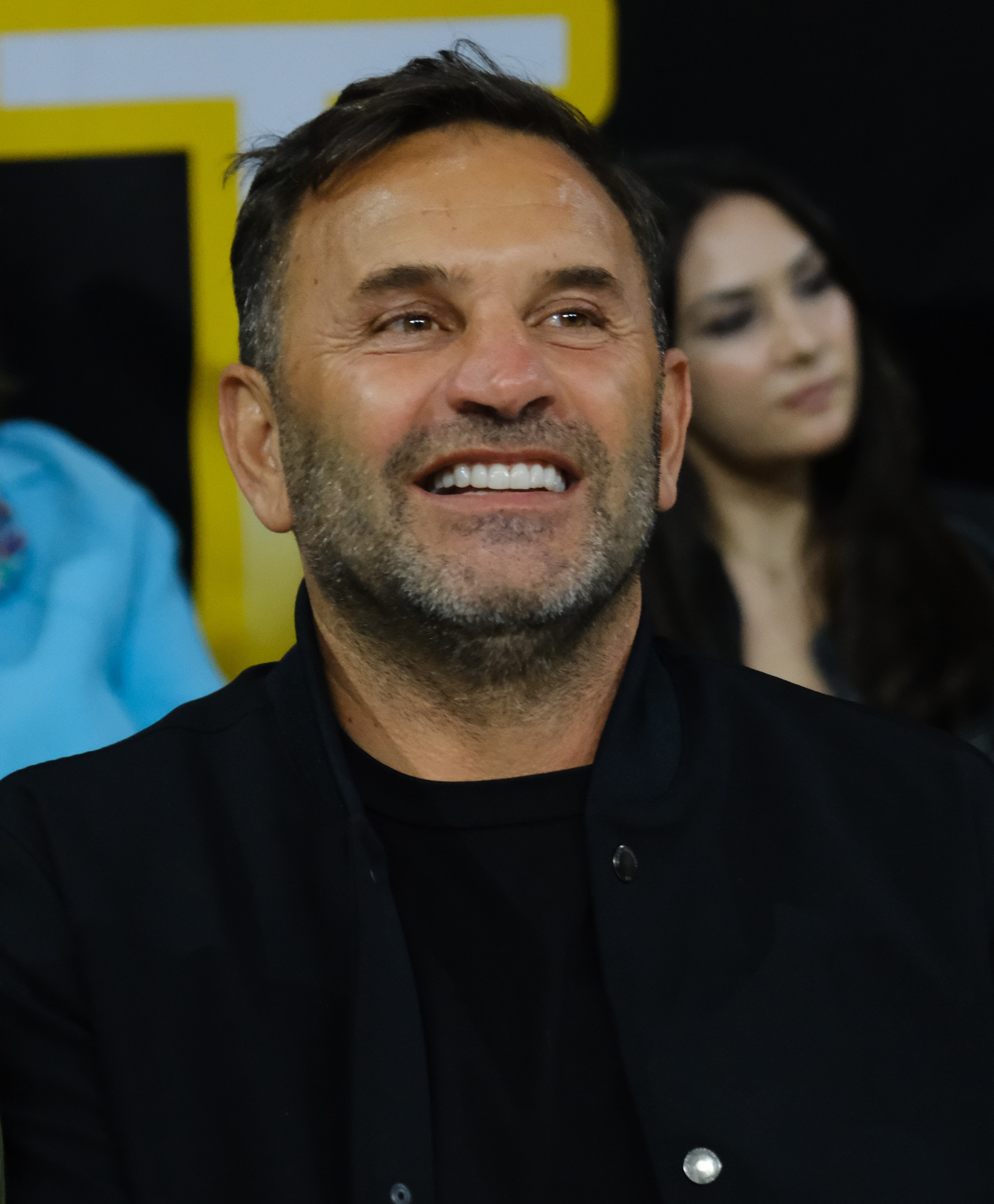
Okan Buruk (2022–)

Only competitive matches are counted. (Note: Includes Istanbul Futbol Lig, Milli Küme, Amatör Futbol Şampiyonası, Istanbul Cup, Istanbul Shield, Süper Lig, Türkiye Kupası, Süper Kupa, UEFA matches)

As of 20 March 2025

Name	Nationality	From	To	P	W	D	L	GF	GA	Win%	Honours	Notes
Boris Nikolof	Bulgaria	1905	1907	3	0	2	1	1	4	0.00		
Emin Bülent Serdaroğlu	Turkey	1907	1908	(n/a)	(n/a)	(n/a)	(n/a)	(n/a)	(n/a)	(n/a)		
Horace Armitage	England	1908	1911	17	17	0	0	70	10	100.00	Istanbul Futbol Ligi (3)	
Emin Bülent Serdaroğlu	Turkey	1911	1914	10	3	4	3	19	13	30.00		
Sadi Bey	Turkey	1915	1916	10	7	2	1	31	12	70.00	Istanbul Futbol Ligi (2)	
Ali Sami Yen	Turkey	1916	1917	9	3	0	6	16	26	33.33		
Necip Şahin	Turkey	1919	1921	8	4	1	3	20	18	50.00		
Adil Giray	Turkey	1922	1923	20	13	1	6	56	26	65.00	Istanbul Futbol Ligi	
Billy Hunter	Scotland	Jul 1924	Jun 1928	16	14	2	0	74	14	87.50	Istanbul Futbol Ligi (3)	
Nihat Bekdik	Turkey	Dec 1928	Apr 1930	16	10	4	2	65	19	62.50	Istanbul Futbol Ligi	
Jules Limbeck	Hungary	Apr 1930	Jun 1931	16	12	3	1	56	12	75.00	Istanbul Futbol Ligi	
Fred Pegnam	England	Jul 1931	Dec 1932	4	1	0	3	6	8	25.00		
Syd Puddefoot	England	Jan 1933	Sep 1934	31	16	7	8	74	43	51.61	Istanbul Kupası	
Hans Baar	Austria	Oct 1934	Sep 1936	36	28	2	6	129	38	77.78		
Peter Szabo	Hungary	Oct 1936	Sep 1938	48	29	7	12	148	87	60.42		
Hans Tandler	Austria	Oct 1938	Sep 1939	32	22	5	5	95	41	68.75	Milli Küme	
Hayman n/a	England	Oct 1939	Dec 1939	10	7	0	3	42	8	70.00		
Hans Baar	Austria	Jan 1940	Feb 1940	6	5	1	0	31	1	83.33		
Ceslav Zaharczuk	Poland	Mar 1940	May 1941	30	18	6	6	93	38	60.00		
Bill Baggett	England	Jun 1941	Sep 1945	117	82	16	19	352	105	70.09	Istanbul Kupası (2)	
Miço Dimitriyadis	Greece	Oct 1945	Aug 1946	14	4	6	4	18	15	28.57		
József Schweng	Hungary	Sep 1946	Dec 1947	33	15	12	6	67	46	45.45		
Pat Molloy	England	Jan 1948	Apr 1949	23	16	2	5	57	26	69.57	Istanbul Futbol Ligi	
Duggie Lochhead	England	Sep 1950	Oct 1952	31	18	9	4	56	27	58.06		
Gündüz Kılıç	Turkey	Oct 1952	Mar 1953	15	7	5	3	25	14	46.67		
László Székely	Hungary	Oct 1953	Jan 1954	10	5	3	2	26	11	50.00		
Gündüz Kılıç	Turkey	Feb 1954	Jun 1957	76	55	12	9	88	74	72.37	Istanbul Futbol Ligi (2)	
Musa Sezer	Turkey	Jul 1957	Nov 1957	10	8	2	0	33	5	80.00		
George Dick	Scotland	Dec 1957	Jun 1959	57	40	10	7	147	36	70.18	Istanbul Futbol Ligi	
Leandro Remondini	Italy	Jul 1959	Jan 1960	19	10	7	2	32	10	52.63		
Coşkun Özarı	Turkey	Jan 1960	Apr 1960	19	14	3	2	42	13	73.68		
Gündüz Kılıç	Turkey	Jul 1960	Dec 1963	151	96	36	19	293	102	63.58	Süper Lig (2), Türkiye Kupası	
Coşkun Özarı	Turkey	Jan 1964	Sep 1964	29	15	8	6	50	23	51.72	Türkiye Kupası	
Gündüz Kılıç	Turkey	Oct 1964	Jun 1967	113	53	41	19	179	110	46.90	Türkiye Kupası (2), Süper Kupa	
Eşfak Aykaç; Bülent Eken	Turkey	Jul 1967	Jun 1968	40	18	11	11	60	42	45.00		
Tomislav Kaloperović	Yugoslavia	Jul 1968	Jun 1970	82	42	22	18	105	52	51.22	Süper Lig, Süper Kupa	
Coşkun Özarı	Turkey	Jul 1970	Jun 1971	35	19	9	7	61	22	54.29	Süper Lig	
Brian Birch	England	Jul 1971	Jun 1974	118	59	38	21	147	70	50.00	Süper Lig (2), Türkiye Kupası, Süper Kupa	
Jack Mansell	England	Jul 1974	Jun 1975	36	20	7	9	42	27	55.56		
Don Howe	England	Jul 1975	Jun 1976	44	19	14	11	59	39	43.18	Türkiye Kupası	
Malcolm Allison	England	Jul 1976	Oct 1977	41	13	18	10	46	43	31.71		
Fethi Demircan	Turkey	Oct 1977	Jun 1978	31	15	11	5	42	23	48.39		
Coşkun Özarı	Turkey	Jul 1978	Sep 1979	39	18	9	12	53	33	46.15		
Turgay Şeren	Turkey	Sep 1979	May 1980	31	11	11	9	35	29	35.48		
Tamer Kaptan (Interim)	Turkey	May 1979	Jun 1980	6	2	2	2	8	4	33.33		
Brian Birch	England	Jun 1980	Nov 1981	46	19	12	15	42	35	41.30		
Günay Kayalar (Interim)	Turkey	Nov 1981	Dec 1981	2	1	1	0	1	0	50.00		
Özkan Sümer	Turkey	Dec 1981	Jun 1983	69	31	22	16	93	67	44.93	Türkiye Kupası	
Günay Kayalar (Interim)	Turkey	Jun 1983	Jun 1983	2	1	0	1	3	2	50.00		
Tomislav Ivić	Yugoslavia	Jun 1983	Jun 1984	40	19	12	9	63	37	47.50		
Jupp Derwall	Germany	Jul 1984	Jun 1987	136	70	47	19	198	99	51.47	Süper Lig, Türkiye Kupası, Süper Kupa, Prime Minister's Cup	
Mustafa Denizli	Turkey	Jun 1987	Jun 1989	94	57	21	16	202	96	60.64	Süper Lig, Süper Kupa	
Sigfried Held	Germany	Jun 1989	May 1990	39	20	7	12	65	35	51.28	Prime Minister's Cup	
Mustafa Denizli	Turkey	Jun 1990	Jun 1992	73	45	13	15	137	79	61.64	Türkiye Kupası, Süper Kupa	
Karl-Heinz Feldkamp	Germany	Jul 1992	Jun 1993	42	27	9	6	94	33	64.29	Süper Lig, Türkiye Kupası	
Reiner Hollmann	Germany	Jul 1993	May 1994	48	28	9	11	86	52	58.33	Süper Lig, Süper Kupa	
Reinhard Saftig	Germany	Jun 1994	Mar 1995	38	21	7	10	78	44	55.26		
Müfit Erkasap (Interim)	Turkey	Mar 1995	May 1995	12	5	4	3	23	16	41.67	Prime Minister's Cup	
Graeme Souness	Scotland	Jun 1995	May 1996	43	25	8	10	80	46	58.14	Türkiye Kupası	
Fatih Terim	Turkey	Jun 1996	Jun 2000	204	131	46	27	465	204	64.22	Süper Lig (4), Türkiye Kupası (2), Süper Kupa (2), UEFA Cup	
Mircea Lucescu	Romania	Jul 2000	Jun 2002	105	63	22	20	211	113	60.00	UEFA Super Cup, Süper Lig	
Fatih Terim	Turkey	Jul 2002	Mar 2004	83	43	16	24	127	95	51.81		
Gheorghe Hagi	Romania	Mar 2004	Jun 2005	47	32	6	9	91	40	68.09	Türkiye Kupası	
Eric Gerets	Belgium	Jul 2005	Jun 2007	89	49	21	19	176	100	55.06	Süper Lig	
Karl-Heinz Feldkamp	Germany	Jul 2007	Mar 2008	45	25	11	9	78	44	55.56		
Cevat Güler (Interim)	Turkey	Apr 2008	Jun 2008	6	6	0	0	13	3	100.00	Süper Lig	
Michael Skibbe	Germany	Jul 2008	Feb 2009	37	20	9	8	67	43	54.05	Süper Kupa	
Bülent Korkmaz	Turkey	Feb 2009	Jun 2009	16	8	4	4	21	18	50.00		
Frank Rijkaard	Netherlands	Jul 2009	Oct 2010	67	37	15	15	132	70	55.22		
Gheorghe Hagi	Romania	Oct 2010	Mar 2011	24	8	6	10	26	28	33.33		
Bülent Ünder (Interim)	Turkey	Mar 2011	Jun 2011	8	4	1	3	12	12	50.00		
Fatih Terim	Turkey	Jul 2011	Sep 2013	95	56	24	15	176	95	58.95	Süper Lig (2), Süper Kupa (2)	
Cláudio Taffarel (Interim)	Brazil	Sep 2013	Sep 2013	1	0	1	0	1	1	0.00		
Roberto Mancini	Italy	Sep 2013	Jun 2014	46	24	13	9	82	37	52.17	Türkiye Kupası	
Cesare Prandelli	Italy	Jul 2014	Nov 2014	16	6	3	7	15	29	37.50		
Cláudio Taffarel (Interim)	Brazil	Nov 2014	Nov 2014	1	1	0	0	1	0	100.00		
Hamza Hamzaoğlu	Turkey	Dec 2014	Nov 2015	52	33	9	10	116	60	63.46	Süper Lig, Türkiye Kupası, Süper Kupa	
Cláudio Taffarel (Interim)	Brazil	Nov 2015	Nov 2015	2	0	1	1	3	5	0.00		
Mustafa Denizli	Turkey	Nov 2015	Mar 2016	22	11	6	5	41	29	50.00		
Orhan Atik (Interim)	Turkey	Mar 2016	Mar 2016	3	0	3	0	5	5	0.00		
Jan Olde Riekerink	Netherlands	Mar 2016	Feb 2017	42	22	10	10	50	39	52.38	Türkiye Kupası, Süper Kupa	
Igor Tudor	Croatia	Feb 2017	Dec 2017	34	19	4	11	67	47	55.88		
Fatih Terim	Turkey	Dec 2017	Jan 2022	176	97	35	44	340	209	55.11	Süper Lig (2), Türkiye Kupası, Süper Kupa	
Domènec Torrent	Spain	Jan 2022	Jun 2022	20	7	5	8	28	31	35.00		
Okan Buruk	Turkey	Jun 2022		196	142	27	27	446	198	72.45	Süper Lig (3), Türkiye Kupası, Süper Kupa	

== By total managed matches ==
Only competitive matches are counted. (Note: Includes Istanbul Futbol Lig, Milli Küme, Amatör Futbol Şampiyonası, Istanbul Cup, Istanbul Shield, Süper Lig, Türkiye Kupası, Süper Kupa, UEFA matches)

As of 30 May 2025

- (n/a) = Information not available

Name	Period	Seasons	P	W	D	L	GF	GA	Win%	Titles
(Turkey) Fatih Terim	1996–00, 2002–04, 2011–13, 2017–2022	14	558	327	121	110	1,108	603	58.60	17
(Turkey) Gündüz Kılıç	1952–53, 1954–57, 1960–63, 1964–67	11	355	211	94	50	585	300	59.44	8
(Turkey) Mustafa Denizli	1987–89, 1990–92, 2015–16	4	182	112	40	30	376	204	61.54	4
(England) Brian Birch	1971–74, 1980–81	4	164	78	50	36	189	105	47.56	4
(Turkey) Okan Buruk	2022–	3	150	110	22	18	351	154	73.33	5
(Germany) Jupp Derwall	1984–1987	3	148	70	55	23	206	117	47.30	3
(Turkey) Coşkun Özarı	1960, 1964, 1970–71, 1978–79	3	122	66	29	27	206	91	54.10	2
(England) Bill Baggett	1941–1945	4	117	82	16	19	352	105	70.09	2
(Romania) Mircea Lucescu	2000–2002	3	105	63	22	20	211	113	60.00	2

=== Trophies ===
As of 30 May 2025

Rank	Manager	Süper Lig	Türkiye Kupası	TFF Süper Kupa	UEFA Europa League	UEFA Super Cup	Total
1	(Turkey) Fatih Terim	8	3	5	1	–	17
2	(Turkey) Gündüz Kılıç	4	3	1	–	–	8
3	(Turkey) Okan Buruk	3	1	1	–	–	5
3	(Turkey) Mustafa Denizli	1	1	2	–	–	4
3	(England) Brian Birch	2	1	1	–	–	4
5	(England) Horace Armitage	3	–	–	–	–	3
5	(Scotland) Billy Hunter	3	–	–	–	–	3
5	(Germany) Jupp Derwall	1	1	1	–	–	3
5	(Turkey) Hamza Hamzaoğlu	1	1	1	–	–	3
8	(Turkey) Sadi Bey	2	–	–	–	–	2
8	(Romania) Mircea Lucescu	1	–	–	–	1	2
8	(Germany) Karl-Heinz Feldkamp	1	1	–	–	–	2
8	(Germany) Reiner Hollmann	1	–	1	–	–	2
8	(England) Bill Baggett	–	2	–	–	–	2
8	(Turkey) Coşkun Özarı	1	1	–	–	–	2
8	(Germany) Jupp Derwall	1	1	–	–	–	2
8	(Netherlands) Jan Olde Riekerink	–	1	1	–	–	2
17
17	(Turkey) Adil Giray	1	–	–	–	–	1
17	(Turkey) Nihat Bekdik	1	–	–	–	–	1
17	(Hungary) Jules Limbeck	1	–	–	–	–	1
17	(Austria) Hans Tandler	1	–	–	–	–	1
17	(England) Peter Molloy	1	–	–	–	–	1
17	(Scotland) George Dick	1	–	–	–	–	1
17	(Socialist Federal Republic of Yugoslavia) Toma Kaleperovic	1	–	–	–	–	1
17	(Belgium) Eric Gerets	1	–	–	–	–	1
17	(Turkey) Cevat Güler	1	–	–	–	–	1
17	(England) Syd Puddefoot	–	1	–	–	–	1
17	(England) Don Howe	–	1	–	–	–	1
17	(Turkey) Özkan Sümer	–	1	–	–	–	1
17	(Scotland) Graeme Souness	–	1	–	–	–	1
17	(Romania) Gheorghe Hagi	–	1	–	–	–	1
17	(Italy) Roberto Mancini	–	1	–	–	–	1
17	(Germany) Michael Skibbe	–	–	1	–	–	1

- Most seasons as coach: Fatih Terim, 14 years in four spells from 1996 to 2000, 2002 to 2004, 2011 to 2013 and from 2017 to 2022.
- Most consecutive seasons as coach: Fatih Terim managed the club for five years (2017 - 2022).
