= 1906–07 Istanbul Football League =

İstanbul Football League
- Season: 1906–07
- Champions: Cadi-Keuy FC (2nd title)
- Matches: 17
- Goals: 26 (1.53 per match)

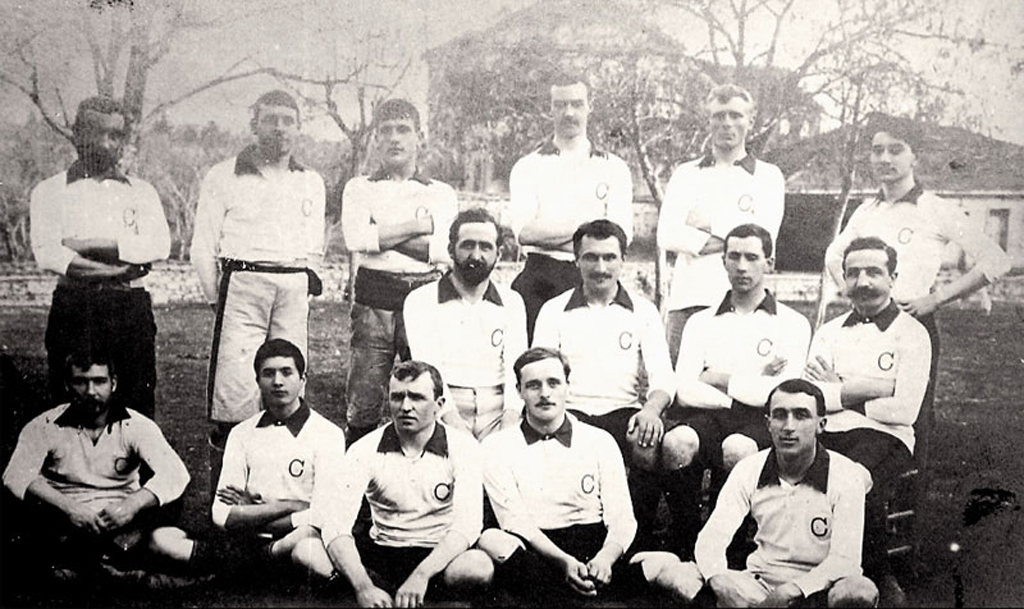
Istanbul Sunday League - Cadikeuy Football Club 1906-07 Champion

The 1906–07 İstanbul Football League season was the third season of the league. Cadi-Keuy FC won the league for the second time.

== Season ==
Pos	Team	Pld	W	D	L	GF	GA	GD	Pts
1	Cadi-Keuy FC	4	2	2	0	12	3	+9	6
2	Moda FC	4	2	1	1	10	3	+7	5
3	HMS Imogene FC	3	1	1	1	3	1	+2	3
4	Galatasaray	4	0	2	2	2	10	−8	2
5	Elpis FC	3	0	0	3	0	15	−15	0

== Matches ==
- November 1906 Moda FC 5 - Cadi-Keuy FC 0
- November 1906 Galatasaray - Moda FC: 1-1
- December 1906 HMS Imogene FC - Moda FC: 3-1
- December 1906 Elpis FC 0 - Cadi-Keuy FC 4
