= 1908–09 Istanbul Football League =

İstanbul Football League
- Season: 1908–09
- Champions: Galatasaray (1st title)

The 1908–09 İstanbul Football League season was the 5th season of the league. Galatasaray won the league for the first time.

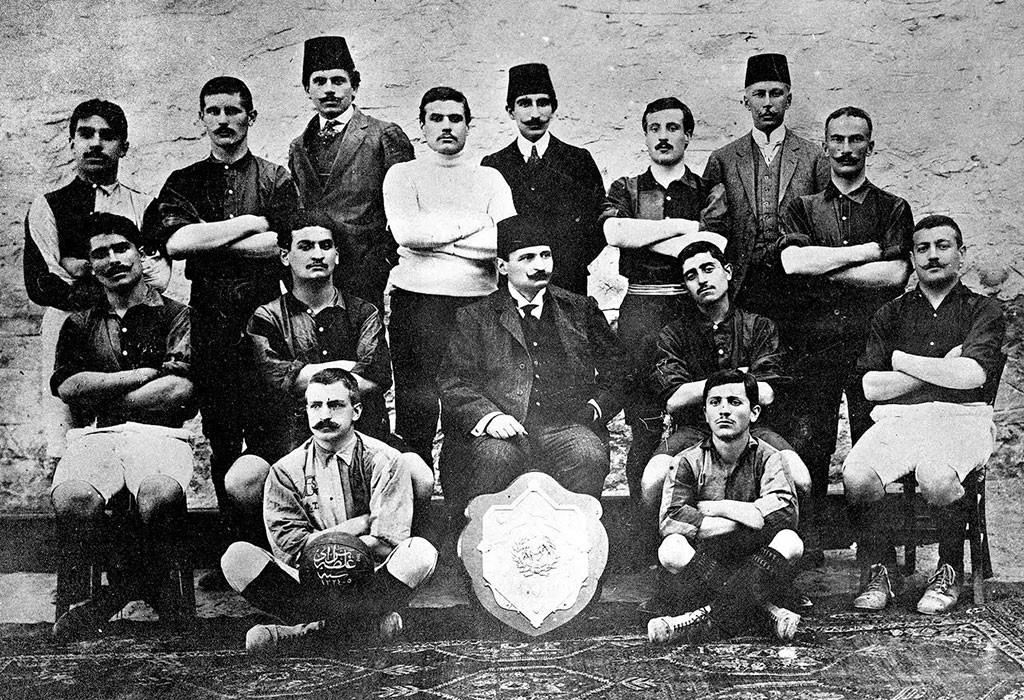
Istanbul Sunday League - Galatasaray SK 1908-09 Champion

== Season ==
Pos	Team	Pld	W	D	L	GF	GA	GD	Pts
1	Galatasaray	3	3	0	0	17	0	+17	6
2	Fenerbahce	0	?	?	?	?	?	—	0
3	HMS Imogene FC	0	?	?	?	?	?	—	0
4	Cadi-Keuy FC	0	?	?	?	?	?	—	0

== Matches ==
- Galatasaray - Cadi-Keuy FC: 4–0
- Galatasaray - HMS Imogene FC: 11–0
- Galatasaray - Fenerbahce: 2–0
- Fenerbahçe - Elpis FC: 2-2
