= 1910–11 Istanbul Football League =

Istanbul Football League
- Season: 1910–11
- Champions: Galatasaray (3rd title)
- Matches: 40
- Goals: 48 (1.2 per match)

The 1910–11 Istanbul Football League season was the 7th season of the league. Galatasaray won the league for the third time.

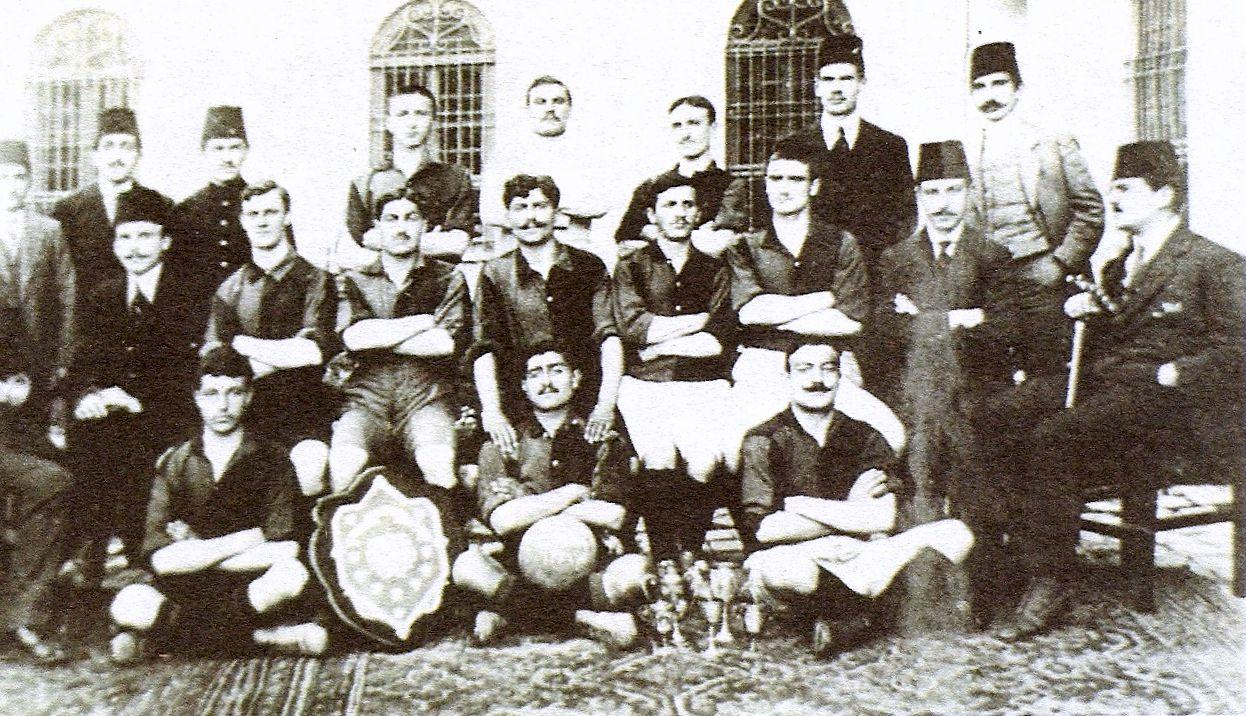
Istanbul Sunday League - Galatasaray SK 1910-11 Champion

== Season ==
Pos	Team	Pld	W	D	L	GF	GA	GD	Pts
1	Galatasaray SK	8	8	0	0	29	2	+27	16
2	Progress FC	8	4	0	4	10	18	−8	8
3	Cadi-Keuy FC	7	2	1	4	6	4	+2	5
4	Strugglers FC	6	1	2	3	6	7	−1	4
5	Fenerbahçe SK	7	1	1	5	3	23	−20	3

== Matches ==
Galatasaray – Fenerbahçe SK: 5–0
Galatasaray – Fenerbahçe SK: 7–0
Galatasaray – Progress FC: 3–1
Galatasaray – Progress FC: 8–1
Galatasaray – Strugglers FC: 1–0
Galatasaray – Strugglers FC: 3–0 Won by decision
Galatasaray – Cadi-Keuy FC: 1–0
Galatasaray – Cadi-Keuy FC: 1–0
Fenerbahçe SK – Progress FC: 0–5
Fenerbahçe SK – Progress FC: 0–1
Fenerbahçe SK – Cadi-Keuy FC: 0–3
Fenerbahçe SK – Cadi-Keuy FC: 1-0
Fenerbahçe SK – Strugglers FC: 2–2
