= Cadi-Keuy F.C. =

Cadi-Keuy FC
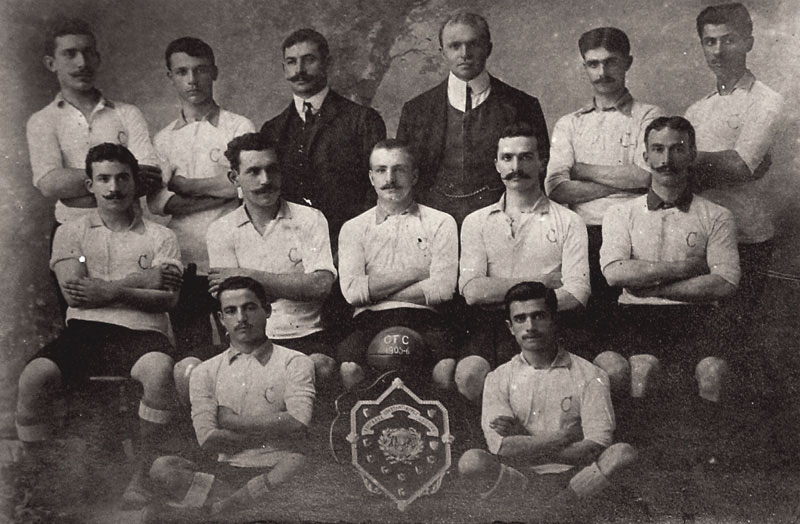
- From left to right standing: Themistoklis Moisiyadis, Cinon Poliheroniadis, Ioannis Vasiliadis, James Lafontaine, Todori, Anthony Darny. Middle row, left to right: “Bobby” Fuat Hüsnü Kayacan, Dick Lafontaine, Horace Armitage, Nicholas Darny, Georgios Yerasimidis. Sitting, left to right: Michalis Yerasimidis, Toto Stelyanidis, with their championship shield.
- Full name: Cadi-Keuy Football Club
- Founded: 1902
- Dissolved: 1912
- Ground: Papazın Çayırı
Home colours

Cadi-Keuy FC is a defunct sports club of Istanbul, Ottoman Empire. The colours of the club were blue and white. It was also known by its C.F.C. acronym. The club was based in Kadıköy, in the Asian part of Constantinople.

== History ==
Cadi-Keuy FC was a club which was founded by Englishmen James Lafontaine and Horace Armitage in 1902, with the great the majority of the players being Greek, while they were also a few Turkish footballers in the team. Its name is a foreign rendering of Kadıköy, its home ground, as the standard Turkish Latin alphabet did not yet exist at the time of the club's creation. The club had great support by the Greeks of Kadıköy, given that not only the majority of the players were Greek, but also the club colours (blue and white) coincided with those of the Greek flag.

On Sunday 31 January 1909 Kadiköy played in final of the Union Club Cup, the first football cup to be played in Ottoman Empire, at the Union Club field at Kadiköy. They lost 4-0 to Galatasaray AFC. The match was also a Constantinople league match and not a separate competition.

On 8th May 1912 the Balkan War erupted and almost all the players from the football clubs were called to the military with the 1912-13 season was not concluded. However, only a few matches were played, but the season was never completed. In one if the matches, Galatasaray and Kadıköy finished on a 0-0 draw.

With the end of the Balkan wars, Kadıköy withdrew from league, and a new team took their place in the league. It was formed by English technicians and workers employed at the Constantinople telephone company, under the name of Kampana Club, sporting the same blue and white jerseys.

=== Rivalries ===
Τhe club's biggest rival was Moda F.C. and it was considered Constantinople's early crosstown derby by fans and the local press. In 1908, relations between 1908 champions Moda and Kadikeuy, a club that had lost its original international flavour and was populated by Greek footballers, had reached a new low to such an extent that Kadikeuy refused to hand over the shield, so Moda couldn’t inscribe its name on the trophy.

In this 1907-08 season as well Kadikeuy and Moda finished the league with equal number of points and played a pair of play-off matches to decide the champion. Moda won the first match. In the second match, while the score was 1-1, a goal being disqualified by the referee, and Kadikeuy supporters invaded the pitch and the team withdrew. The referee called the match off and the Association decided Moda that won the first match would be the champion.

=== Historical squads ===
Constantinople champions 1906
Temistol Moisiyadis, Yani Vasiliadis, James Lafontaine, Cinon Poliheroniadis, Todori, Anthony Darny, “Bobby” Fuat Hüsnü, Dick Lafontaine, Horace Armitage, Nicholas Darny, Yorgo Yerasimidis, Mihal Yerasimidis, Toto Stelyanidis. Directors: Yani Vasiliadis, James Lafontaine.

== Honours ==
- Constantinople Football League:
  - Winners: 1905–1906, 1906–1907
- Union Club Cup:
  - Runners-up: 1909

== Emblem ==
the trefoil was the club's emblem.

The club's badge was of sky blue and blue colour with a capital C' in the middle. Later, the trefoil became its emblem.

== Matches ==
- Cadi-Keuy FC-Moda FC:0–5 (1906)
- Cadi-Keuy FC-Galatasaray SK:11–0 (1906)
- Cadi-Keuy FC-Galatasaray SK:7–0 (1906)
- Cadi-Keuy FC-Galatasaray SK:6–4 (1906)
- Cadi-Keuy FC-Galatasaray SK:2–1 (1906)
- Cadi-Keuy FC-Galatasaray SK:0–0 (1906)
- Cadi-Keuy FC-Galatasaray SK:11–0 (1907)
- Cadi-Keuy FC-Galatasaray SK:8–0 (1907)
- Cadi-Keuy FC-Galatasaray SK:0–0 (1907)
- Galatasaray SK-Cadi-Keuy FC:4–0 (1909)
- Galatasaray SK-Cadi-Keuy FC:3–0 awd. (1910)
- Galatasaray SK-Cadi-Keuy FC:3–0 awd. (1911)
- Cadi-Keuy FC-Galatasaray:0–0 (1912)
- Fenerbahçe SK-Cadi-Keuy FC:0–2 (1908)
- Fenerbahçe SK-Cadi-Keuy FC:2–1 (1909)
- Fenerbahçe SK-Cadi-Keuy FC:2–3 (1909)
- Fenerbahçe SK-Cadi-Keuy FC:1–3 (7 November 1909)
- Fenerbahçe SK-Cadi-Keuy FC:2–0 (1910)
- Fenerbahçe SK-Cadi-Keuy FC:1–3 (1910)
- Fenerbahçe SK-Cadi-Keuy FC:4–1 (1911)
- Fenerbahçe SK-Cadi-Keuy FC:3–2 (1911)
- Fenerbahçe SK-Cadi-Keuy FC:3–1 (1911)
- Fenerbahçe SK-Cadi-Keuy FC:4–0 (1912)
- Fenerbahçe SK-Cadi-Keuy FC:4–1 (1912)

== League tables ==
Constantinople Football League:

- 1904–05 Istanbul Football League:
  1) HMS Imogene FC
  2) Moda FC
  3) Cadi-Keuy FC
  4) Elpis FC
- 1905–06 Istanbul Football League:
  1) Cadi-Keuy FC
  2) HMS Imogene FC
  3) Moda FC
  4) Elpis FC
- 1906–07 Istanbul Football League:
  1) Cadi-Keuy FC
  2) Moda FC
  3) HMS Imogene FC
  4) Galatasaray SK
  5) Elpis FC
- 1907–08 Istanbul Football League:
  1) Moda FC
  2) Cadi-Keuy FC
  3) Galatasaray SK
  4) Elpis FC
  5) HMS Imogene FC
- 1908–09 Istanbul Football League:
  1) Galatasaray SK
  2) Moda FC
  3) HMS Imogene FC
  4) Cadi-Keuy FC
- 1909–10 Istanbul Football League:
  1) Galatasaray SK
  2) Strugglers FC
  3) Moda FC
  4) Cadi-Keuy FC
  5) Fenerbahçe SK
- 1910–11 Istanbul Football League:
  1) Galatasaray SK
  2) Progress FC
  3) Cadi-Keuy FC
  4) Strugglers FC
- 1911–12 Istanbul Football League:
  1) Fenerbahçe SK
  2) Rumblers FC
  3) Strugglers FC
  4)Progress FC
  5)Cadi-Keuy FC

== Notable players ==
- (United Kingdom) James La Fontaine
- (Greece) Aleko Darmis (known as “Tahtaperde” [wooden curtain])
- (United Kingdom) Horace Armitage (transferred to the Galatasaray in 1908)
- (Turkey) Fuat Hüsnü Kayacan (Note: fuat Hüsnü Bey, who was in the squad, was the first Turkish football player. Since the football played by non-Muslims was prohibited to Muslim youth at that time, he played in the team under the nickname Bobby.)
- (Turkey) Hasan Basri bey
- (Greece) Aleko Talyos
- (Greece) Michalis Papazoglou

== See also ==
- List of Turkish Sports Clubs by Foundation Dates

== Sources ==
- Levantin heritage
- Fenerbahçe Spor Kulübü Tarihi 1907–1957 (by Dr. Rüştü Dağlaroğlu) The History of Fenerbahçe SK 1907–1957.
- Kadıköy Futbol Kulübü. Türk Futbol Tarihi. vol.1. page (22). (June 1992) Türkiye Futbol Federasyonu Yayınları.
- Levantine Heritage 80
