= HMS Imogene F.C. =

HMS Imogene FC
- Full name: HMS Imogene Football Club
- Founded: 1904
- Dissolved: 1909
- Ground: Papazın Çayırı
Home colours

HMS Imogen FC is a defunct sports club of Istanbul, Ottoman Empire. The club was founded by Englishmen.

== History ==
HMS Imogene FC was a club which was founded by the crew of HMS Imogene in 1904. They were the first club to win the Istanbul Football League.

== Honours ==
Istanbul Football League:

Winners: 1904–1905

== League tables ==
- Istanbul Football League:

- 1904–05 Istanbul Football League:
  1) HMS Imogene FC
  2) Moda FC
  3) Cadi-Keuy FC
  4) Elpis FC
- 1905–06 Istanbul Football League:
  1) Cadi-Keuy FC
  2) HMS Imogene FC
  3) Moda FC
  4) Elpis FC
- 1906–07 Istanbul Football League:
  1) Cadi-Keuy FC
  2) Moda FC
  3) HMS Imogene FC
  4) Galatasaray SK
  5) Elpis FC
- 1907–08 Istanbul Football League:
  1) Moda FC
  2) Cadi-Keuy FC
  3) Galatasaray SK
  4) Elpis FC
  5) HMS Imogene FC
- 1908–09 Istanbul Football League:
  1) Galatasaray SK
  2) Moda FC
  3) HMS Imogene FC
  4) Cadi-Keuy FC

== See also ==
- List of Turkish Sports Clubs by Foundation Dates
