= Horace Armitage =

English footballer and manager

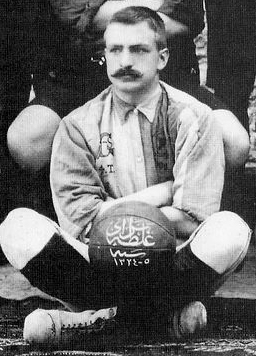

Personal information
- Place of birth: England

Senior career*
Years	Team	Apps	(Gls)
1899–1907	Cadi-Keuy		
1908	Fenerbahçe		
1908–1911	Galatasaray		

Managerial career
- 1908–1911: Galatasaray
- * Club domestic league appearances and goals

Horace Armitage was an English football player and manager who managed Galatasaray between 1908 and 1911. He also played for Fenerbahçe before going to Galatasaray SK. He was one of the founders of Cadi-Keuy.

Armitage scored in the first-ever derby between Galatasaray and Fenerbahçe.
