= Strugglers F.C. =

Defunct association football club in the Ottoman Empire

Strugglers FC
- Full name: Strugglers Foot-ball Club Moda
- Founded: 1907
- Dissolved: 1914
- Ground: Papazın Çayırı
Home colours

Strugglers FC was an association football club which was founded in Istanbul by the Greek residents of the city in 1907. It was located in Moda, Kadıköy.

The club withdrew from the league and disbanded after warnings from Ottoman authorities to change their blue-white colour scheme inspired by the Greek flag.

== Honours ==
- Istanbul Football League:
  - Runners-Up: 1909–1910

== Emblem ==
The club's badge was a capital S of white colour. The club's name meaning in Greek was Aγωνιστές.

== See also ==
- List of Turkish Sports Clubs by Foundation Dates

== Sources ==
- Tuncay, Bülent (2002). Galatasaray Tarihi. Yapı Kredi Yayınları ISBN 975-08-0454-6
- Dağlaroğlu, Rüştü. Fenerbahçe Spor Kulübü Tarihi 1907–1957
