= Elpis F.C. =

Defunct Greek sports club in Istanbul, Ottoman Empire

Elpis FC
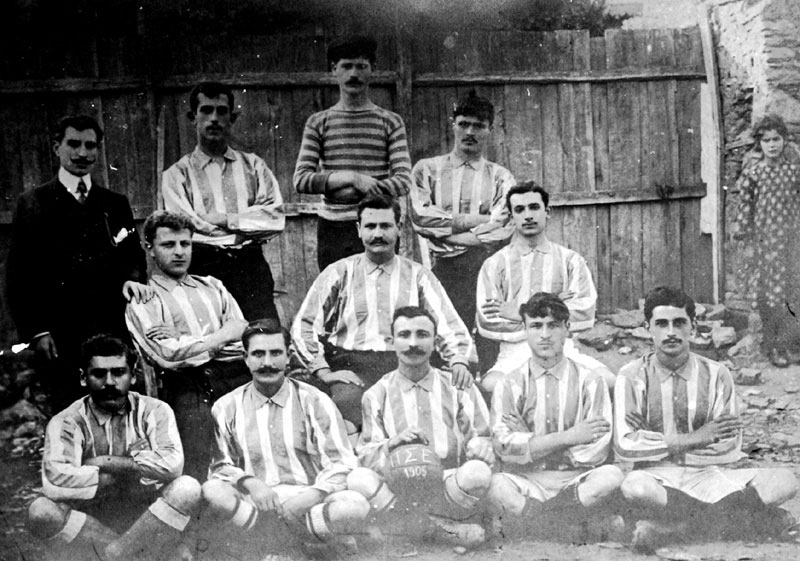
- Full name: Elpis Football Club
- Founded: 1904 (again in 1921)
- Dissolved: 1910 (again in 1924)
- Ground: Papazın Çayırı
Home colours

Elpis FC (Greek:Ελπίς, meaning Hope), is a defunct sports club of Istanbul, Ottoman Empire. The colours of the club were blue and white as in the Greek flag.

== History ==
Elpis FC was founded in 1904 in Kadıköy district of Istanbul by the local Greeks and the team was completely made up by Greek footballers. The football club was dissolved in 1912. Elpis FC was refounded again and participated in the 1921-22 Sunday League (Turkish: Pazar Ligi) but re-dissolved again in 1924.

== Matches ==
20 March 1910 Fenerbahçe SK – Elpis FC: 1–1

== League tables ==
Constantinople Football League:

- 1904–05 Istanbul Football League:
  1) HMS Imogene FC
  2) Moda FC
  3) Cadi-Keuy FC
  4) Elpis FC
- 1905–06 Istanbul Football League:
  1) Cadi-Keuy FC
  2) HMS Imogene FC
  3) Moda FC
  4) Elpis FC
- 1906–07 Istanbul Football League:
  1) Cadi-Keuy FC
  2) Moda FC
  3) HMS Imogene FC
  4) Galatasaray SK
  5) Elpis FC
- 1907–08 Istanbul Football League:
  1) Moda FC
  2) Cadi-Keuy FC
  3) Galatasaray SK
  4) Elpis FC
  5) HMS Imogene FC

== Notable managers ==
- (Greece) Yani Vasiliadis

== See also ==
- List of Turkish Sports Clubs by Foundation Dates

== Sources ==
- Levantin heritage
