= Ali Sami Yen =

Turkish footballer and sports manager (1886–1951)

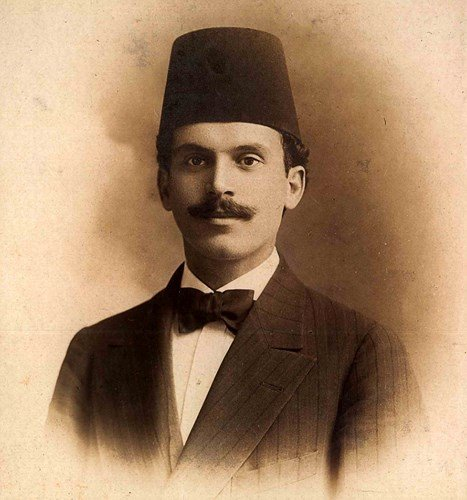
- Portrait of Ali Sami Yen

Personal information
- Full name: Ali Sami Yen
- Date of birth: 20 May 1886
- Place of birth: Üsküdar, Istanbul, Ottoman Empire (modern Turkey)
- Date of death: 29 July 1951 (aged 65)
- Place of death: Istanbul, Turkey; Buried in Feriköy Cemetery, Istanbul, Turkey

Senior career*
Years	Team	Apps	(Gls)
1905–1910	Galatasaray		

Managerial career
- 1916–1917: Galatasaray
- 1923: Turkey
- * Club domestic league appearances and goals

Ali Sami Yen, born (20 May 1886 – 29 July 1951) was an Albanian-Ottoman sports official best known as the founder of the Galatasaray Sports Club.

== Life ==
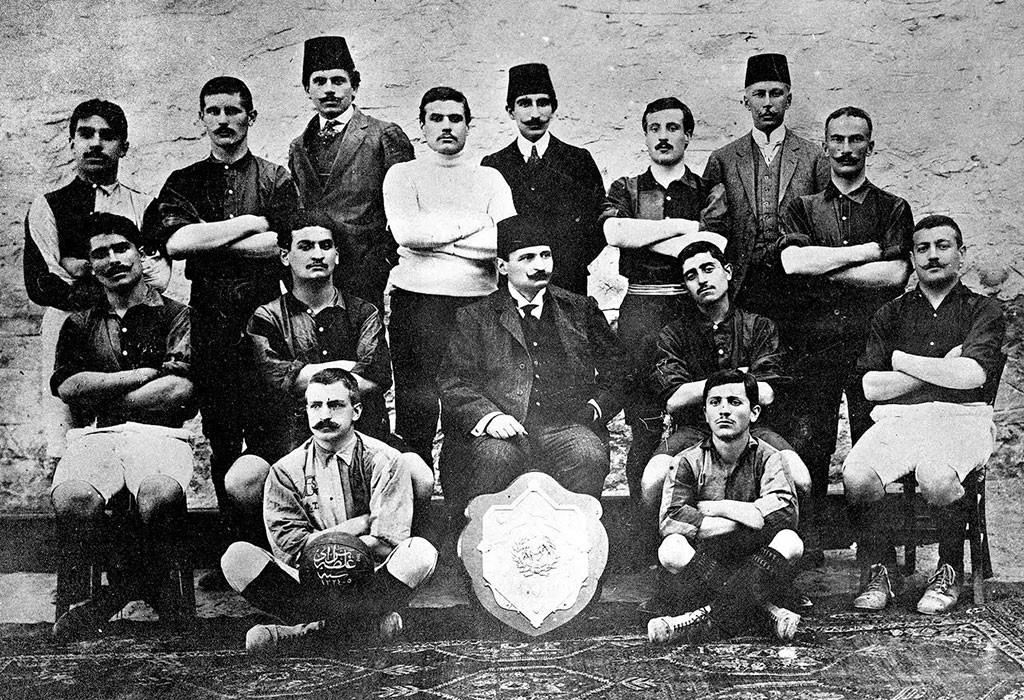
Istanbul Football League champions, Galatasaray, 1909. On foot: Adnan İbrahim, Milo Bakić, Ali Sami Yen, Ahmet Robenson, Asım Tevfik, Emin Bülent, Hamit Hüsnü, Fuat Hüsnü.

Ali Sami Yen was born in Üsküdar, Istanbul, Turkey. He was the son of Sami Frashëri, one of the most famous Albanian writers, philosophers and playwrights.

He was a student at the prestigious Galatasaray High School in Istanbul. In October 1905, he decided with some of his fellow students to create an association football club. At the beginning, the stated goal was "To play together like Englishmen, to have a color and a name, and to beat the other non-Turkish teams" according to him.

Ali Sami Yen founded the colours of Galatasaray, stating, "We were imagining brightness of yellow-red fire over our team and thinking that it would carry us from one victory to another."

In 1905, during the era of the Ottoman Empire, there were no laws for associations so the club could not be registered officially, but, after the 1912 Law of Association, the club registered legally.

Yen was the club's first president for 13 years, between 1905 and 1918, and again for a brief spell in 1925. Besides founding Galatasaray SK, he made numerous other contributions to Turkish sports. He was president of the Turkish Olympic Committee between 1926 and 1931. He coached the Turkey national team in its first international match, in 1923 against Romania.

After the enactment of law on family names in 1934, he took the surname Yen. Ali Sami Yen died in 1951. He was laid to rest at the Feriköy Cemetery in Istanbul.

As founder and first president of Galatasaray SK, Ali Sami Yen's name was given to the Galatasaray's long time Ali Sami Yen Stadium which was built in 1964 and situated in the center of Istanbul in Mecidiyeköy. However, in January 2011, the club moved to its new home in the Rams Park in the Kâğıthane district while the old stadium was demolished to make way for the construction of a new commercial development.

== Personal life ==
He was married to Fahriye Yen (born November 1900 and died 6 October 2002).

== Honours ==
=== As player ===
Galatasaray

- Istanbul Football League: 1908–1909, 1909–1910, 1910–1911

== See also ==
- List of one-club men
- List of Galatasaray S.K. presidents

Sporting positions
Preceded by First	President of Galatasaray; 1905 – 15 May 1919	Succeeded by Refik Cevdet Kalpakçıoğlu
Preceded by Yusuf Ziya Öniş	President of Galatasaray; 23 April 1925 – 17 July 1925	Succeeded by Ahmet Robenson
