= List of ministers of the interior of Turkey =

The following is a list of ministers of the interior of Turkey.

No.	Portrait	Minister	Term of office		Political party
1		Cami Baykurt	3 May 1920	13 July 1920	Independent
2		Hakkı Behiç Bayiç	17 July 1920	4 September 1920	Independent
3		Nazım Resmor	4 September 1920	16 September 1920	Independent
4		Refet Bele	16 September 1920	18 March 1921	Independent
5		Ata Atalay	21 April 1921	30 June 1921	Independent
(4)		Refet Bele	30 June 1921	10 October 1921	Independent
6		Fethi Okyar	10 October 1921	9 July 1922	Independent
7		İsmail Safa Özler	12 July 1922	5 November 1922	Independent
(6)		Fethi Okyar	5 November 1922	27 October 1923	Independent
8		Ahmet Ferit Tek	30 October 1923	22 November 1924	Republican People's Party
9		Recep Peker	22 November 1924	5 January 1925	Republican People's Party
10		Cemil Uybadın	5 January 1925	1 November 1927	Republican People's Party
11		Şükrü Kaya	1 November 1927	11 November 1938	Republican People's Party
12		Refik Saydam	11 November 1938	25 January 1939	Republican People's Party
13		Faik Öztrak	25 January 1939	6 May 1942	Republican People's Party
14		Ahmet Fikri Tüzer	6 May 1942	16 August 1942	Republican People's Party
(9)		Recep Peker	17 August 1942	20 May 1943	Republican People's Party
15		Hilmi Uran	20 May 1943	7 August 1946	Republican People's Party
16		Şükrü Sökmensüer	7 August 1946	5 September 1947	Republican People's Party
17		Münir Hüsrev Göle	5 September 1947	16 January 1949	Republican People's Party
18		Emin Erişirgil	16 January 1949	22 May 1950	Republican People's Party
19		Rüknettin Nasuhioğlu	22 May 1950	9 March 1951	Democrat Party
20		Halil Özyörük	9 March 1951	20 October 1951	Democrat Party
21		Fevzi Lütfi Karaosmanoğlu	2 December 1951	7 April 1952	Democrat Party
22		Ethem Menderes	1 August 1952	17 May 1954	Democrat Party
23		Namık Gedik	17 May 1954	10 September 1955	Democrat Party
(22)		Ethem Menderes	30 September 1955	12 October 1956	Democrat Party
(23)		Namık Gedik	12 October 1956	27 May 1960	Democrat Party
24		Muharrem İhsan Kızıloğlu	30 May 1960	4 February 1961	Military
25		Nasır Zeytinoğlu	4 February 1961	20 November 1961	Military
26		Ahmet Topaloğlu	20 November 1961	25 June 1962	Justice Party
27		Kemal Sahir Kurutluoğlu	25 June 1962	10 October 1962	Republican People's Party
—		Orhan Öztrak; Acting Minister	10 October 1962	18 October 1962	Republican People's Party
28		Hıfzı Oğuz Bekata	18 October 1962	8 October 1963	Republican People's Party
29		İlyas Seçkin	22 October 1963	25 December 1963	Republican People's Party
30		Orhan Öztrak	25 December 1963	20 February 1965	Republican People's Party
31		İsmail Hakkı Akdoğan	20 February 1965	31 July 1965	Nation Party
32		İzzet Gener	31 July 1965	27 October 1965	Nation Party
33		Mehmet Faruk Sükan	27 October 1965	1 August 1969	Justice Party
34		Salih Ragıp Üner	1 August 1969	3 November 1969	Justice Party
35		Haldun Menteşeoğlu	3 November 1969	26 March 1971	Justice Party
36		Hamdi Ömeroğlu	26 March 1971	11 December 1971	Independent
37		Ferit Kubat	11 December 1971	15 April 1973	Independent
38		Mukadder Öztekin	15 April 1973	26 January 1974	Independent
39		Oğuzhan Asiltürk	26 January 1974	17 November 1974	National Salvation Party
(38)		Mukadder Öztekin	17 November 1974	31 March 1975	Independent
(39)		Oğuzhan Asiltürk	31 March 1975	11 April 1977	National Salvation Party
40		Sabahattin Özbek	11 April 1977	21 June 1977	Justice Party
41		Necdet Uğur	21 June 1977	21 July 1977	Republican People's Party
42		Korkut Özal	21 July 1977	5 January 1978	National Salvation Party
43		İrfan Özaydınlı	5 January 1978	2 January 1979	Republican People's Party
—		Orhan Eyüpoğlu; Acting Minister	2 January 1979	16 January 1979	Republican People's Party
44		Hasan Fehmi Güneş	16 January 1979	5 October 1979	Republican People's Party
45		Vecdi İlhan	8 October 1979	12 November 1979	Republican People's Party
46		Mustafa Gülcügil	12 November 1979	21 July 1980	Justice Party
47		Orhan Eren	4 August 1980	12 September 1980	Justice Party
48		Selahattin Çetiner	20 September 1980	13 December 1983	Military
49		Ali Tanrıyar	13 December 1983	26 October 1984	Motherland Party
50		Yıldırım Akbulut	26 October 1984	16 September 1987	Motherland Party
51		Ahmet Selçuk	16 September 1987	21 December 1987	Motherland Party
52		Mustafa Kalemli	21 December 1987	30 March 1989	Motherland Party
53		Abdülkadir Aksu	30 March 1989	23 June 1991	Motherland Party
(52)		Mustafa Kalemli	23 June 1991	26 August 1991	Motherland Party
54		Sabahattin Çakmakoğlu	29 August 1991	20 November 1991	Neutral (Bureaucrat)
55		İsmet Sezgin	21 November 1991	25 June 1993	True Path Party
56		Beytullah Mehmet Gazioğlu	25 June 1993	24 October 1993	True Path Party
57		Nahit Menteşe	24 October 1993	31 October 1995	True Path Party
58		Teoman Ünüsan	31 October 1995	6 March 1996	Neutral (Bureaucrat)
59		Ülkü Güney	6 March 1996	28 June 1996	Motherland Party
60		Mehmet Ağar	28 June 1996	8 November 1996	True Path Party
61		Meral Akşener	8 November 1996	30 June 1997	True Path Party
62		Murat Başesgioğlu	30 June 1997	4 August 1998	True Path Party
63		Kutlu Aktaş	4 August 1998	11 January 1999	Motherland Party
64		Cahit Bayar	11 January 1999	28 May 1999	Neutral (Bureaucrat)
65		Sadettin Tantan	28 May 1999	5 June 2001	Motherland Party
66		Rüştü Kazım Yücelen	5 June 2001	5 August 2002	Motherland Party
67		Muzaffer Ecemiş	5 August 2002	18 November 2002	Neutral (Bureaucrat)
(53)		Abdülkadir Aksu	18 November 2002	8 May 2007	Justice and Development Party
68		Osman Güneş	8 May 2007	29 August 2007	Neutral (Bureaucrat)
69		Beşir Atalay	29 August 2007	8 March 2011	Justice and Development Party
(68)		Osman Güneş	8 March 2011	6 July 2011	Neutral (Bureaucrat)
70		İdris Naim Şahin	6 July 2011	24 January 2013	Justice and Development Party
71		Muammer Güler	24 January 2013	25 December 2013	Justice and Development Party
72		Efkan Ala	25 December 2013	7 March 2015	Justice and Development Party
73		Sebahattin Öztürk	7 March 2015	28 August 2015	Neutral (Bureaucrat)
74		Selami Altınok	28 August 2015	24 November 2015	Independent
(72)		Efkan Ala	24 November 2015	31 August 2016	Justice and Development Party
75		Süleyman Soylu	31 August 2016	4 June 2023	Justice and Development Party
76		Ali Yerlikaya	4 June 2023	11 February 2026	Independent
77		Mustafa Çiftçi	11 February 2026	Incumbent	Independent

== See also ==
- Ministry of the Interior (Turkey)
