= Öztrak =

Öztrak is a surname of Turkish origin. It is used by a political family from Tekirdağ.

Notable people with the surname include:

- Faik Öztrak (born 1954) (born 1954), Turkish politician
- Faik Öztrak (born 1882) (1882–1951), Turkish politician
- Orhan Öztrak (1914–1995), Turkish politician
