= Seçkin =

Seçkin (IPA: [ˈsetʃkin], literally "distinguished", "exclusive", "outstanding") or Seckin is a Turkish male given name, female given name and surname and may refer to:

== Given name ==
- Seçkin Getbay (born 1989), Turkish footballer
- Seçkin Özdemir (born 1981), Turkish actor and former TV presenter, radio personality, and disc jockey (DJ)

== Surname ==
- Ece Seçkin (born 1991), Turkish pop singer
- Emine Seçkin (born 1980), Turkish para-badminton player
- İlyas Seçkin (1918–1996), Turkish civil servant, lawyer, politician and former government minister
- Tamer Seckin, American gynecologist
