= Faik Öztrak =

Faik Öztrak may refer to:

- Faik Öztrak (politician, born 1954), Turkish politician
- Faik Öztrak (politician, born 1882) (1882–1951), Turkish bureaucrat and politician
