= Pietro Bertolini =

Italian politician

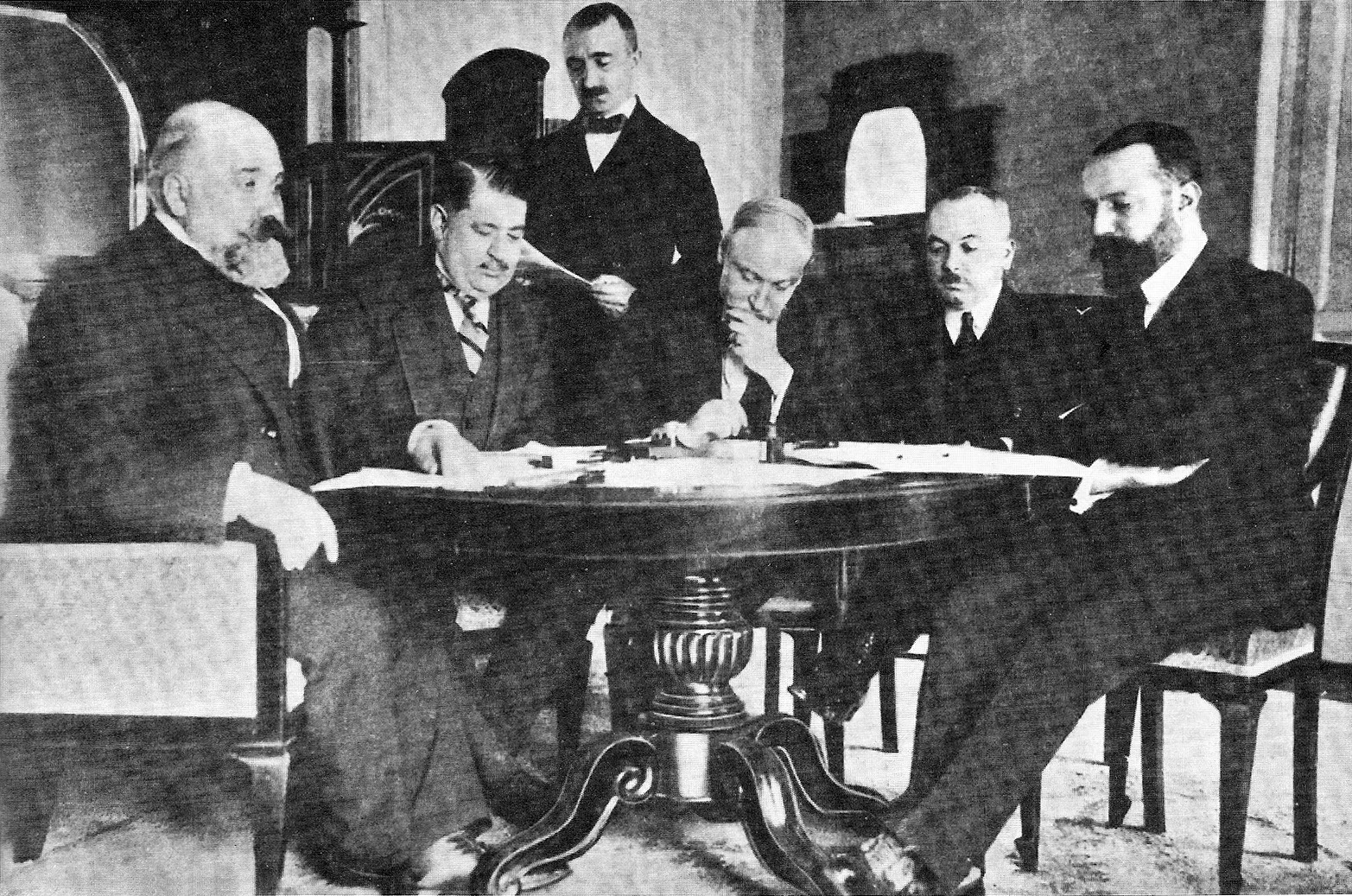
Turkish and Italian delegations at Lausanne. From left to right (seated): Pietro Bertolini, Mehmet Nabi Bey, Guido Fusinato, Rumbeyoğlu Fahreddin Bey, and Giuseppe Volpi.

Pietro Bertolini (24 July 1859 – 28 November 1920) was an Italian statesman. He was the first Italian minister of colonies.

== Biography ==
Bertolini was born on 24 July 1859 in Montebelluna. He began his career as a barrister and student of economic and administrative questions, became mayor of Montebelluna in 1885 and entered parliament in 1891 as member for Montebelluna. Two years later, he became Under-Secretary for Finance in the Crispi cabinet. He was afterwards Under-Secretary at the Ministry of the Interior in the Pelloux cabinet (1898–1900), in which he was, so to speak, the representative of Baron Sonnino's party. On the fall of Gen. Pelloux he hoped to return to office in a future Sonnino ministry; but as the latter seemed ever less likely to become a reality, Bertolini lost patience and joined Sig. Giolitti.

His conduct in abandoning his old chief was much criticised at the time, but his new patron chose him as Minister of Public Works and Transports in the cabinet of 1907. He proved a capable administrator, especially when he had to face the nearly total destruction of Messina and Reggio Calabria due to the terrible earthquake of 1908 . His capacities permitted rapid aid to the survivors and also an efficient reconstruction of the two destroyed cities, using at their best the bulk buying and transport capacities of the rail system which he had reorganized as minister of public transports.

In 1912 he led a three member commission (with Guido Fusinato and Giuseppe Volpi) to negotiate peace with Turkey after the War for Libya. In October the peace treaty was signed and Bertolini was appointed Minister of the Colonies.

Then he visited Libya to organize the new administration and negotiate the rendition of some rebellion chiefs, by incorporating them in the Italian army; however, on his return to Rome, he was informed that the Italian army command had executed the rebellion chiefs, with the result that the armed rebellion was finally terminated only in 1934.

He was rapporteur for the extended suffrage bill, which first came into force with the general elections of 1913. The measure had been introduced to please the demagogic spirit which Giolitti wished to conciliate, but Bertolini must be given credit for the ingeniousness of the machinery which he devised for enabling illiterates to vote and for avoiding electoral corruption as far as possible.

On the outbreak of World War I, Bertolini was an uncompromising neutralist, like Giolitti, and was nearly lynched by some interventionists in Rome (see Radiosomaggismo). During the war he remained in retirement from politics but was very active in helping, with his influence, to alleviate the Veneto population's suffering until the end of the war.

In 1916 he made an important speech in parliament in favor of the adoption of the Montessori pedagogic method.

In 1919 Signor Nitti appointed him senator and president of the Italian delegation on the Reparations Commission in Versailles, where he obtained for Italy important compensations from Germany and Austria (which England and France tried to oppose).

He died in Turin on 28 November 1920 of a heart stroke on his return from Paris to Rome.

He was the author of several valuable works on political and economic questions, notably a volume on local government in England.

== Notes ==
Political offices
Preceded by none	Italian Minister of Colonies; 1912–1914	Succeeded by Ferdinando Martini
