= Candan Yüceer =

Turkish politician

Dr. Candan Yüceer
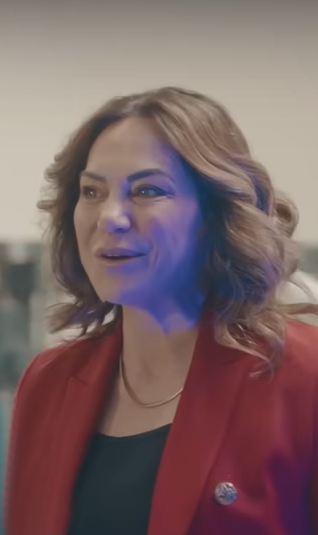

Mayor of Tekirdağ
- Incumbent
- Assumed office 5 April 2024
- Preceded by: Kadir Albayrak

President of Union of Municipalities of Thrace
- Incumbent
- Assumed office 30 May 2024
- Preceded by: Kadir Albayrak

Member of the Grand National Assembly
- In office 28 June 2011 – 14 May 2023
- Constituency: Tekirdağ (2011, June 2015, Nov 2015, 2018)

Personal details
- Born: 4 May 1973 (age 53) Malatya, Turkey
- Party: Republican People's Party (CHP) (2008-2026); New Party (2026); Justice and Development Party (2026-present)
- Spouse: Kamil Yüceer
- Children: 2
- Education: Gazi University
- Occupation: Politician
- Profession: Medical doctor
- Website: TBMM profile

Candan Yüceer (born 4 May 1973) is a Turkish politician from the New Party. She is the current Mayor of Tekirdağ and President of Union of Municipalities of Thrace. Also, she has served as a Member of Parliament for Tekirdağ from 28 June 2011 to 14 May 2023.

== Early life and career ==
Yüceer was born on 4 May 1973 in Malatya. She graduated from Gazi University Faculty of Medicine and worked as a Ministry of Health practitioner in Ankara, Samsun and the Çerkezköy district of Tekirdağ. In Çerkezköy, she also worked as a workplace health practitioner.

She is one of the founding members of Çerkezköy's CUMOK society, which is one of the most well known Kemalist societies in Turkey formed by readers of the newspaper Cumhuriyet. She also served on the executive board of CUMOK nationally. She was a member and the President of Çerkezköy's Atatürkist Thought Association and was also a member of the Women's 'Arm in Arm' Association (Kadınlar El Ele Derneği) and the Medical Chamber.

She is married with two children and can speak English at a semi-fluent level.

== Political career ==
Yüceer was elected as a CHP Member of Parliament for the electoral district of Tekirdağ in the 2011 general election. She was later elected to the CHP Party Council and was re-elected as an MP in the June 2015 general election. As an MP, she gave her support for workers' rights and industrial action, meeting with 1,871 workers who had gone on strike in a polymer factory in Çerkezköy to extend her support on 19 June 2015.

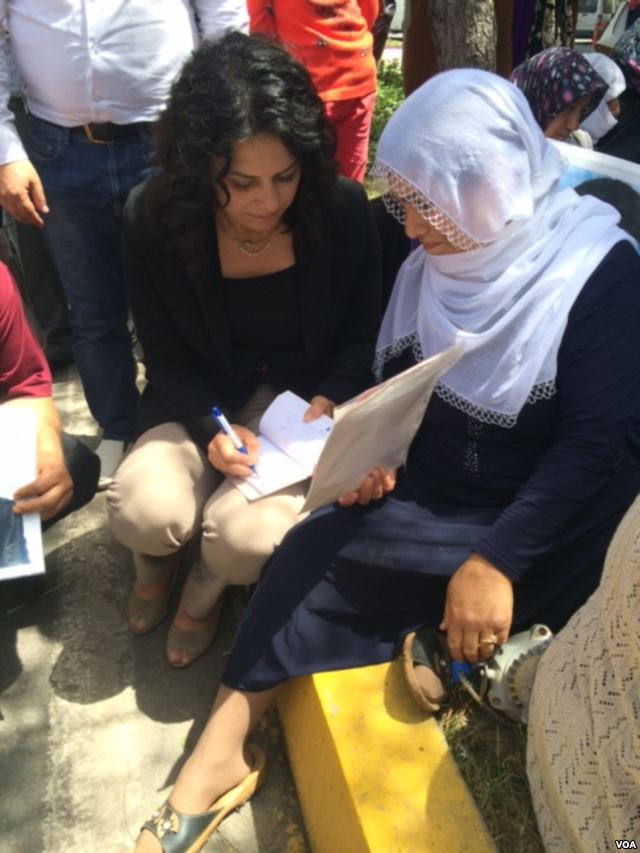
Yüceer meeting members of the public in Diyarbakır

== See also ==
- 24th Parliament of Turkey
- 25th Parliament of Turkey
- Tekirdağ (electoral district)
