= Celal Tevfik Karasapan =

Turkish politician and diplomat (1899–1974)

Minister of Press, Broadcasting and Tourism
- In office 25 June 1962 – 1963
- Prime Minister: İsmet İnönü

Director of National Security
- In office 1959–1960

Ambassador of Turkey to Romania
- In office 1957–1959

Ambassador of Turkey to Libya
- In office 1953–1953

Ambassador of Turkey to Syria
- In office 1952–1952

Personal details
- Born: 1899 Medina, Ottoman Empire
- Died: 9 June 1974 (aged 74–75)
- Party: Republican Villagers Nation Party; Justice Party
- Spouse: Nevzat Karasapan
- Children: 2
- Education: Sciences Po Paris

Celal Tevfik Karasapan (1899–1974) was a Turkish diplomat and politician who served as the director of National Security Service between 1959 and 1960 and minister of press, broadcasting and tourism between 1962 and 1963. He was the ambassador of Turkey to Syria, Libya and Romania in the 1950s.

== Early life and education ==
He was born in Medina, Ottoman Empire, in 1899. After completing his primary and secondary education, he worked as a teacher at the reserve officer training camp from 1916 to 1918. He fought in the War of Independence and was captured by the Greeks in 1920. His military service ended in 1923.

He went to Paris where he received a degree in journalism in 1927 and a degree in diplomacy in 1928 from Paris Institute of Political Studies.

== Career and activities ==
On his return to the country, he worked at Türkiye İş Bankası, the Ministry of Foreign Affairs, and the General Directorate of Security. He was the consul general in Hatay and then in Jerusalem between 1938 and 1942. He was the undersecretary of the Turkish embassies in Tehran and in Belgrade. He served as the consul general in Aleppo in 1946. In 1950, he was named as the director general of personnel department at the Ministry of Foreign Affairs. He was ambassador of Turkey to Syria in 1952. Next he was the ambassador of Turkey to Libya in 1953. His last diplomatic post was the ambassador of Turkey to Romania which he held in 1957. He also served as undersecretary of National Security Service, precursor of the National Intelligence Organization, in 1959 and served in the post for eight months until 1960 when he retired from public post.

Karasapan was elected as a senator from Afyon for the Republican Villagers Nation Party on 15 October 1961 and served at the Senate until 5 June 1966. He was the representative of Turkey at the Parliamentary Assembly of the Council of Europe from 16 January 1962 to 1 September 1962.

Karasapan was appointed the minister of press, broadcasting and tourism to the cabinet headed by İsmet İnönü on 25 June 1962. His tenure ended in 1963. He resigned from the Republican Villagers Nation Party and joined the Justice Party.

Karasapan established a monthly magazine entitled the Middle East (Turkish: Orta Doğu) in 1961 which he also edited. He published books on foreign policy.

== Personal life and death ==
Karasapan was married and had two children with his wife Nevzat. Their daughter, Sevinç, was married to Mümtaz Soysal.

Karasapan died in Ankara on 9 June 1974.

=== Awards ===
He was the recipient of the Medal of Independence which was awarded by Mustafa Kemal Atatürk to him following his release by the Greek forces.
