= Radiosomaggismo =

Popular demonstrations in Italy in May 1915

Radiosomaggismo (Italian for the "Radiant days of May") describes a brief period of popular demonstrations in a number of Italian cities in May 1915, demanding the country’s entry into the First World War.

== Background ==
Although in 1915 Italy was a member of the Triple Alliance with Germany and Austria-Hungary, the Italian government of Antonio Salandra had entered into clandestine discussions to join the Triple Entente. This led to the signing of the secret Treaty of London on 26 April by which Italy agreed to enter the war within one month. On 4 May Italy renounced the Triple Alliance, but did not yet enter the war in the side of the Entente as a majority in parliament continued to favour neutrality. The former Prime Minister Giovanni Giolitti was warned that Salandra intended to take the country to war, and on 9 May he returned to Rome to try to prevent this. On 10 May he tried to persuade King Victor Emmanuel that a vote of confidence in the Chamber of Deputies would show that parliament did not support entry into the war. Realising that he could not secure a majority, on 13 May, Salandra resigned.

== Popular unrest ==
The return of Giolitti to Rome made nationalists and pro-war advocates fear that he would once again become Prime Minister and keep Italy out of the war. This led to the publication of many hostile stories in the press, asserting that Italian pride and honour demanded war. In a speech on 12 May, Gabriele D’Annunzio incited violence, saying that those who refused to take up arms were traitors, and urging the Romans to throw all the filth into the sewers. The following day, the neutralist deputy and former minister Pietro Bertolini was assaulted by an angry mob in the Piazza Colonna while riding on a tram. Other deputies, Luigi Facta, Antonio Graziadei, Domenico Valenzani and Vito De Bellis were also threatened and jeered at. In a number of cities there were violent demonstrations and a number of newspaper offices were sacked. In Bologna, the socialist deputy Nino Mazzoni was chased and beaten.

On 14 May, when news of Salandra’s resignation became public, a crowd of young people besieged the Palazzo Montecitorio where the Italian Chamber of Deputies was sitting, and attempted to set fire to its doors. They were disgusted with representative democracy and in favour of an irridentist war to secure Trieste and Trentino. They articulated a belief that unless it declared war, Italy would become an "effeminate" country. Protests spread into government departments on 15 May, when senior officials led their demonstrations of support for Salandra, who seems to have at least tacitly welcomed this unusual breach of civil service norms.

== Impact ==
Giolitti declined the king’s offer to form a government, and on 16 May Salandra was invited to return as Prime Minister. Strongly influenced by these demonstrations of public ardour, on 20 May parliament voted to declare war on the Central Powers and on 22 May it granted full power to the government to censor the press and to pass public order laws for the duration of the war. On 23 May Italy entered the war.

"Radiosomaggismo" has been discussed as an early indicator of the rise of fascism in Italy, as it involved a popular movement with violently reactionary views. Both its takeover of the streets and the disillusionment of sections of the middle class with the traditional liberalism of Giolitti that it represented were characteristics of the fascist movement when it emerged.
