= Oğuzhan Asiltürk =

Turkish engineer and politician (1935–2021)

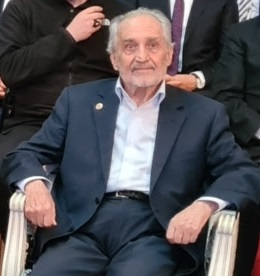
- Asiltürk in 2021

Chairman of the Executive Board of the Felicity Party
- In office 2011 – 1 October 2021

Minister of Industry and Technology
- In office 21 July 1977 – 5 January 1978
- President: Fahri Korutürk
- Prime Minister: Süleyman Demirel
- Preceded by: Tarhan Erdem
- Succeeded by: Orhan Alp

Minister of the Interior
- In office 31 March 1975 – 11 April 1977
- President: Fahri Korutürk
- Prime Minister: Süleyman Demirel
- Preceded by: Mukadder Öztekin
- Succeeded by: Sabahattin Özbek
- In office 26 January 1974 – 17 November 1974
- President: Fahri Korutürk
- Prime Minister: Bülent Ecevit
- Preceded by: Mukadder Öztekin
- Succeeded by: Mukadder Öztekin

Grand National Assembly of Turkey
- In office 14 November 1991 – 1 October 2002
- Constituency: Malatya (1991, 1995, 1999)
- In office 24 October 1973 – 12 September 1980
- Constituency: Ankara (1973, 1977)

Personal details
- Born: 25 May 1935 Hekimhan, Turkey
- Died: 1 October 2021 (aged 86) Ankara, Turkey
- Party: National Salvation Party; Welfare Party; Virtue Party; Felicity Party
- Education: Istanbul Technical University
- Occupation: Civil engineer

Oğuzhan Asiltürk (25 May 1935 – 1 October 2021) was a Turkish politician. He served as Minister of Industry and Technology and Minister of the Interior as well as chairman of the executive board of the Felicity Party.

== Biography ==
Asiltürk attended secondary school in Malatya. He studied at the School of Civil Engineering at Istanbul Technical University and began his career as a freelance consultant and engineer. He married Sevinç Asiltürk, with whom he had four children.

Asiltürk was elected to the Grand National Assembly of Turkey in 1973, representing Ankara. While serving as a deputy, he was also appointed Minister of the Interior, where he served in 1974 and again from 1975 to 1977. He was then appointed Minister of Industry and Technology and held the position from 1977 to 1978. He was banned from politics for 10 years in 1980. The ban was lifted following the 1987 Turkish constitutional referendum and he became Secretary General of the Welfare Party. In 1991, he was once again elected to the Grand National Assembly, representing Malatya and he joined the Virtue Party. He remained in office until 2002.

Following the death of Necmettin Erbakan, Asiltürk became the chairman of the executive board of Felicity Party . He met with President Recep Tayyip Erdoğan on 7 January 2021, a meeting in which Asiltürk alleged that the President told him the Istanbul Convention would be lifted in the country. The President's decision was made official on 20 March 2021, and Turkey withdrew from the Istanbul Convention.

On 13 September 2021, Asiltürk was taken to Ankara Bilkent City Hospital due to shortness of breath from COVID-19. He died of a heart attack on 1 October 2021, at the age of 86. He was interred at Cebeci Asri Cemetery.
