= 26th government of Turkey =

Government of the Republic of Turkey (1961-1962)

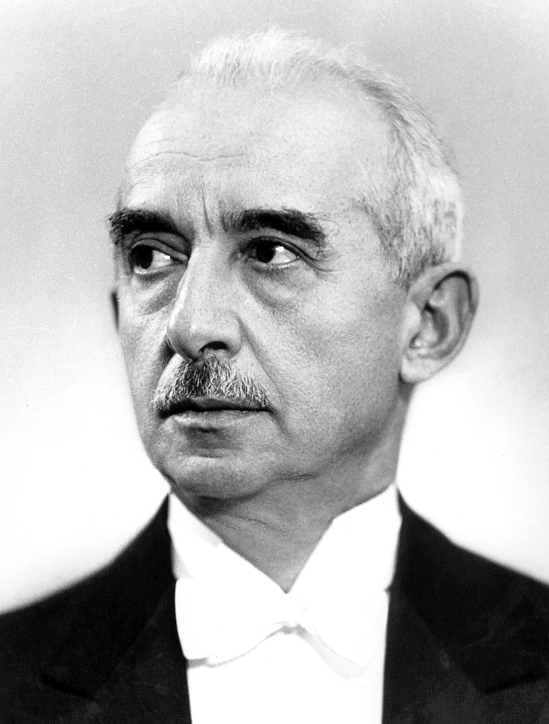
İsmet İnönü

The 26th government of Turkey (20 November 1961 – 25 June 1962), also known as the first coalition government of Turkey and the eight government of İsmet İnönü, was the first civilian government following the 1960 Turkish coup d'état. The prime minister, İsmet İnönü, was the leader of the Republican People's Party (CHP) and a former president of Turkey. The CHP was joined in coalition by the Justice Party (AP).

== Election ==
In the elections held on 15 October 1961, CHP received 36.7%, and AP received 34.8%. Thus, CHP gained 173 seats and AP gained 158 seats in the 450-seat parliament. İnönü formed the first coalition government in the history of Turkey with AP. AP claimed to be the successor of Democrat Party (DP), which had been banned by the leaders of the 1960 coup. İnönü's main objective was to end the tension between the former coup leaders and the Justice Party. In the relatively short span of time in which the 26th government existed, the Justice Party tried to lift the ban on DP politicians, but the former coup partisans opposed this policy. On 22 February 1962, Turkey was faced again with an attempted coup, but İnönü managed to suppress it.

== The government ==
Some of the cabinet members were changed during the lifespan of the cabinet. In the list below, the serving period of cabinet members who served only a part of the cabinets lifespan are shown in the column "Notes".

Title	Name	Party	Notes
Prime Minister	İsmet İnönü	CHP	
Deputy Prime Minister	Ali Akif Eyidoğan	AP	
Minister of State
Minister of State	Turhan Feyzioğlu	CHP	
Minister of State	Avni Doğan; Hıfzı Oğuz Bekata	CHP	20 November 1961 – 23 May 1962; 23 May 1962 – 5 June 1962
Minister of State	Necmi Ökten	AP	
Minister of State	Nihat Su	AP	
Ministry of Justice	Kemal Sahir Kurutluoğlu	Indep	
Ministry of National Defense	İlhami Sancar	CHP	
Ministry of the Interior	Ahmet Topaloğlu	AP	
Ministry of Foreign Affairs	Selim Sarper; Feridun Cemal Erkin	CHP; Indep	20 November 1961 – 26.03-1962; 26 March 1962 – 5 June 1962
Ministry of Finance	Şefik İnan	CHP	
Ministry of National Education	Hilmi İncesulu	CHP	
Ministry of Public Works	Emin Paksüt	CHP	
Ministry of Commerce	İhsan Gürsan	AP	
Ministry of Health and Social Security	Süleyman Suat Seren	AP	
Ministry of Customs and Monopolies	Şevket Pulatoğlu	AP	
Ministry of Agriculture	Cavit Oral	AP	
Ministry of Transport	Mustafa Cahit Akyar	AP	
Ministry of Labour and Social Security	Bülent Ecevit	CHP	
Ministry of Industry	Fethi Çelikbaş	CHP	
Ministry of Culture and Tourism	Kamran Evliyaoğlu	AP	
Ministry of Construction and Settlement	Mehmet Muhittin Güven	AP	

== Aftermath ==
In the last month of the coalition government, the main issue was the idea of an amnesty act for the former DP members. According to an interview, İnönü thought that the split of opinion on this issue made the government nonfunctional, and he resigned.

Preceded by 25th government of Turkey (Cemal Gürsel)	26th Government of Turkey; 20 November 1961 – 25 June 1962	Succeeded by 27th government of Turkey (İsmet İnönü)
