= Selahattin Çetiner =

Turkish military officer and politician (1922–2023)

Minister of the Interior
- In office 20 September 1980 – 13 December 1983
- President: Kenan Evren
- Preceded by: Orhan Eren
- Succeeded by: Ali Tanrıyar

Personal details
- Born: 1 July 1922 Lapseki, Ottoman Empire
- Died: 4 June 2023 (aged 100) Bodrum, Muğla Province, Turkey
- Party: Independent
- Spouse: Meral
- Education: Turkish Military Academy
- Occupation: Military officer

Selahattin Çetiner (1 July 1922 – 4 June 2023) was a Turkish politician and retired lieutenant general in the Turkish Armed Forces. An independent, he served as Minister of the Interior from 1980 to 1983 following the 1980 Turkish coup d'état.

Çetiner became ill at his home in the Koyunbaba neighborhood of Bodrum. He was taken to a private hospital in Bodrum, Muğla Province, where he died from organ failure on 4 June 2023 at the age of 100. Çetiner was survived by his wife, Meral, daughter, Ümit Dinçel, and son, Atıf Çetiner. His funeral was held with military honors at the Büyük Selimiye Mosque in Istanbul with burial in the city's Zincirlikuyu Cemetery.
