= Fahreddin Amidemiri =

Turkish diplomat and politician (1867–1943)

Rumbeyoğlu Fahreddin Bey

Minister of Education of the Ottoman Empire
- In office 5 April 1920 – July 1920
- Monarch: Mehmed VI

Minister of Justice of the Ottoman Empire
- In office July 1920 – 1921
- Monarch: Mehmed VI

Personal details
- Born: 1867 Constantinople, Ottoman Empire
- Died: 1943 (aged 75–76) Istanbul, Turkey

Fahreddin Reşad Bey, also known as Rumbeyoğlu Fahreddin Bey and Rumbeyoglu Fahr al-Din Bey, (1867–1943) was an Ottoman diplomat and politician, who served as minister of education and minister of justice in the last Ottoman government.

== Before World War I ==
Rumbeyoğlu Fahreddin Bey spent most of his working life in the Ottoman diplomatic service. One of his first appearances in Western records was when he was received by Edward VII as first secretary of the Ottoman embassy to the United Kingdom on 13 March 1903. By 1911, Fahreddin Bey was chargé d'affaires at the Ottoman embassy in Berlin.

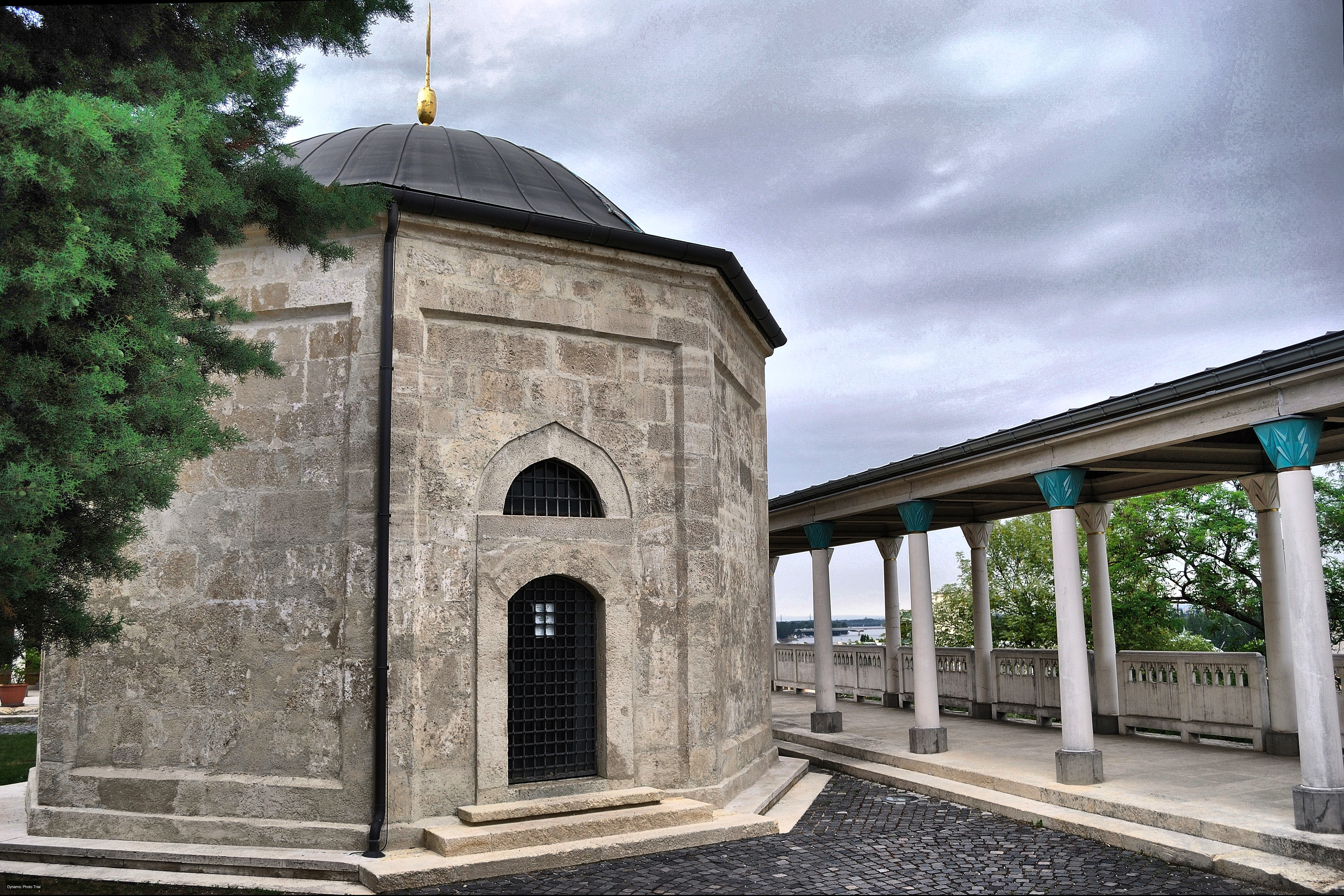
Gül Baba's tomb in Budapest

From August to October 1912, Fahreddin Bey was consul-general in the Ottoman missions in Cetinje (now in Montenegro) and in Budapest. During this posting he became interested in restoring the Ottoman Tomb of Gül Baba in Budapest and wrote an article on the subject.

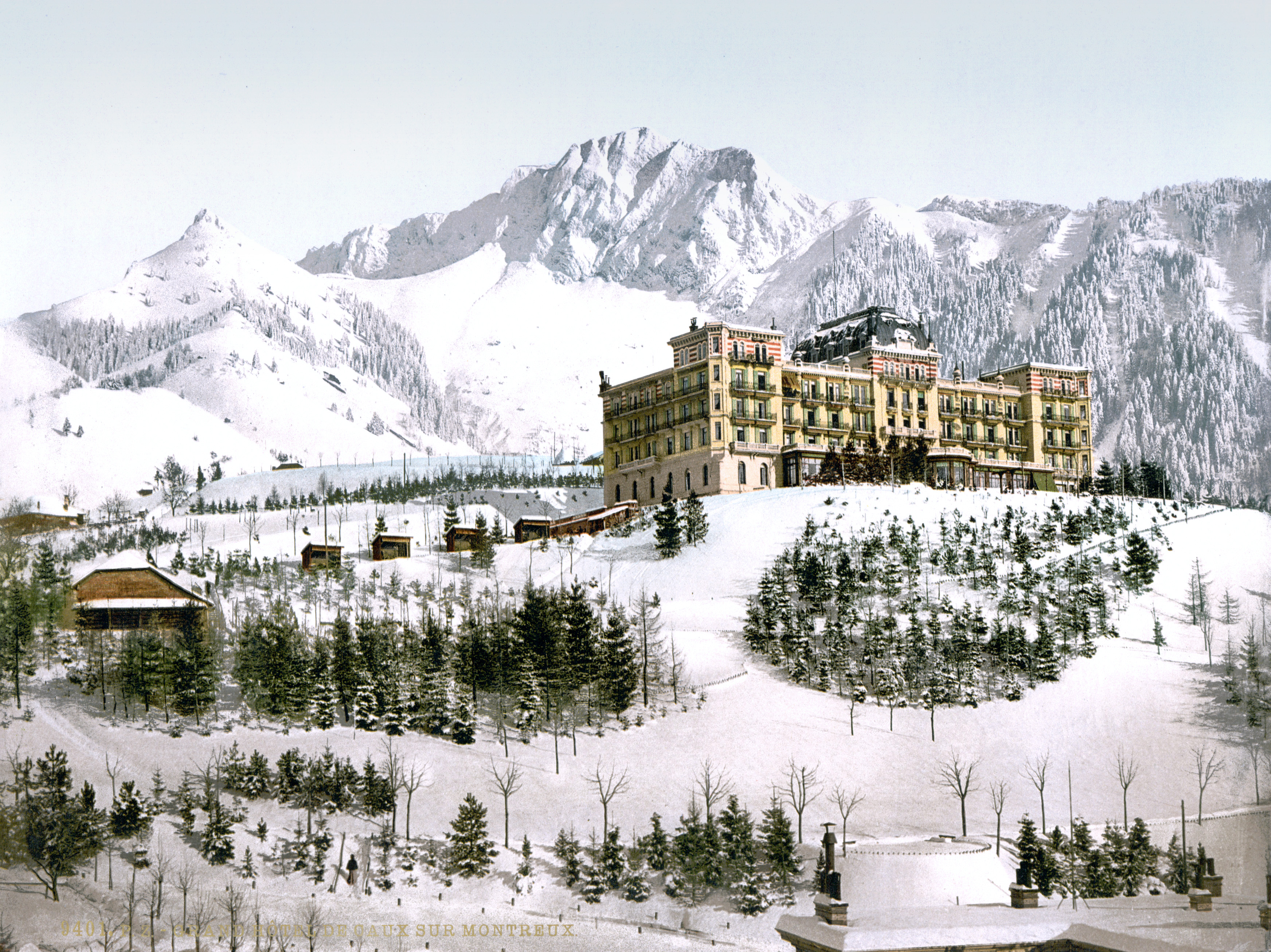
The Grand Hotel in Caux, where Fahreddin Bey negotiated the Treaty of Ouchy with the Italian government.

Rumbeyoğlu Fahreddin Bey then traveled to Ouchy, near Lausanne, Switzerland, with his fellow ambassador Mehmed Nâbi Bey to negotiate a settlement to the Italo-Turkish War. Although Fahreddin and Nabi had been appointed by Ottoman Foreign Minister Gabriel Noradunkyan to draw up a treaty, they did not have plenipotentiary powers and their agreement would be subject to approval by the porte. In order to evade press attention, the Ottoman diplomats met in secret with Italian representatives at the Grand Hotel at Caux-sur-Montreux on 12 October 1912. Negotiation was difficult both because the Turks lacked complete authority and because the Italians were intransigent about their territorial demands in North Africa, but eventually an agreement was reached. This settlement, signed on 18 October 1912, is known as the First Treaty of Lausanne or the Treaty of Ouchy.

In the treaty Rumbeyoğlu Fahreddin Bey is noted as a "Grand Officer of the Imperial Order of the Mecidiye [and] Commander of the Imperial Order of the Osmaniye".

From January to November 1914, Fahreddin Bey worked as chargé d'affaires in St. Petersburg, Russia. After the Black Sea Raid on 29 October 1914, when the Ottoman Navy with German assistance bombed five Russian ports on the Black Sea, on 3 November the Russian government expelled Fahreddin Bey, who returned to Istanbul via Finland and Germany.

In 1916–17, towards the end of World War I, Rumbeyoğlu Fahreddin Bey and Mehmed Nâbi Bey created several reports to advise the Ottoman government on policy matters. One of these was a memorandum on the history of the Hadhramaut aimed to substantiate Ottoman sovereignty claims during post-war negotiation. After they were unable to find any data on the area in the Ottoman Archives, they resorted to using the Encyclopædia Britannica as their primary source.

== Membership in the final Ottoman government ==
After the end of World War I In April 1920, Rumbeyoğlu Fahreddin Bey was named minister of education in Damat Ferid Pasha's last Ottoman government. His most well-known act in this role was apparently to order the replacement of the word "Turkish" in schoolbooks with the word "Ottoman". By July 1920, Fahreddin Bey was appointed minister of justice, continuing in the same role under the new cabinet of Ahmed Tevfik Pasha from August 1920. During this period, Fahreddin Bey was a member of the Kuva-yi Inzibatiye, the "Army of the Caliphate" that was formed by the Istanbul government to oppose the Turkish National Forces under Mustafa Kemal Atatürk. He remained in the cabinet until some time in 1921.

Fahreddin Bey's prominence in the last Ottoman government drew unfavorable attention in the new Turkish Republic. On 23 April 1924 the Grand National Assembly of Turkey declared Fahreddin Bey among 150 personae non gratae of Turkey for his participation in the Kuva-yi Inzibatiye and membership in the cabinet that acceded to the Treaty of Sèvres, causing him to flee into exile.

Following the proclamation of a pardon in 1938, Rumbeyoğlu Fahreddin Bey returned to Turkey where he died in 1943.

== Works ==
- Rumbeyoğlu Fahreddin (1912). "Gül Baba" (PDF). Tarih-i Osmanî Encumeni Mesmuası [Proceedings of the Ottoman History Commission] (in Turkish). 3 (15): 962–965.
- Rumbeyoğlu Fahreddin (1913). "Macaristan'da Bazı Âsâr-ı Osmâniyye" [Some Ottoman Monuments in Hungary] (PDF). Tarih-i Osmanî Encumeni Mesmuası [Proceedings of the Ottoman History Commission] (in Turkish). 4 (22): 1391–1400.
- Rumbeyoğlu Fahreddin (1916). Bagdad Mes'elesi [The Question of Baghdad] (in Turkish). Matbaa-i Âmire.
- Rumbeyoğlu Fahreddin (1916). El-Katar Sevhili Mes'elesi [The Question of the Coast of Qatar] (in Turkish). Matbaa-i Âmire.
- Mehmet Nâbi; Rumbeyoğlu Fahreddin (1916). Bahrayn Adaları Mes'elesi [The Question of the Islands of Bahrain] (in Turkish). Matbaa-i Âmire.
- Mehmet Nâbi; Rumbeyoğlu Fahreddin (1916). Elcezire Kıtasının Irva ve Iska Mes'elesi (in Turkish). Matbaa-i Âmire.
- Mehmet Nâbi; Rumbeyoğlu Fahreddin (27 November 1916). Maskat Mes'elesi [The Question of Muscat] (in Turkish). Matbaa-i Âmire.
- Mehmet Nâbi; Rumbeyoğlu Fahreddin (11 March 1917). Nejd Qit'asi Mes'elesi [The Question of the Territory of Nejd] (in Turkish). Matbaa-i Âmire.
- Mehmet Nâbi; Rumbeyoğlu Fahreddin (1917). Hadramut Mes'elesi [The Question of Hadramaut] (in Turkish). Matbaa-i Âmire.
- Mehmet Nâbi; Rumbeyoğlu Fahreddin (1917). Gümrük Resmi'nin Yuzde On Beşe İblağı, Ecnebi Postalar ve Kapitülâsyon [Transmitting Fifteen Percent of Official Customs, Foreign Mail and Capitulation] (in Turkish). Matbaa-i Âmire.
- Rumbeyoğlu Fahreddin (1918). Şeyh Said Mes'elesi [The Question of Cheikh Saïd] (in Turkish). Matbaa-i Âmire.

== Sources ==
- Childs, Timothy Winston (1990). Italo-Turkish Diplomacy and the War Over Libya: 1911–1912. Brill. ISBN 9004090258.
- Hanioğlu, M. Şükrü (8 March 2010). A Brief History of the Late Ottoman Empire. Princeton University Press. ISBN 978-1400829682.
- Kuneralp, Sinan (2003). Son Dönem Osmanlı Erkân ve Ricali (1839–1922): Prosopografik Rehber [Late Ottoman General Staff and Officers (1839–1922): A Prosopografic Guide] (in Turkish) (2 ed.). Istanbul: Isis Press.
- Murray, Francis Lavelle (3 November 1914). "Too Late for Turkey to Treat with Russia". Naugatuck Daily News. Vol. 19, no. 333. p. 1.
- "At the court held on Friday the 13th inst". The Standard. No. 24566. London. 19 March 1903. p. 5, column 7.
- Stephenson, Charles (19 December 2014). A Box of Sand: The Italo-Ottoman War 1911–1912. Tattered Flag. ISBN 9780957689275.
