= 27th government of Turkey =

Government of the Republic of Turkey (1962-1963)

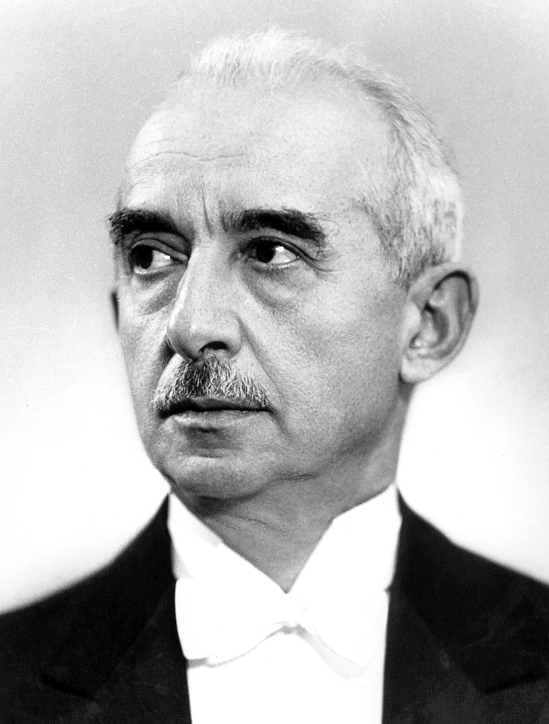
İsmet İnönü

The 27th government of Turkey (25 June 1962 – 25 December 1963) is the second coalition government in the history of Turkey. The prime minister, İsmet İnönü, was the leader of Republican People's Party (CHP) and a former president.

== Background ==
After a short coalition with Justice Party (AP) in the previous government, the new coalition partners were New Turkey Party (YTP) of Ekrem Alican, Republican Villagers Nation Party (CKMP), and the Independents. However, Osman Bölükbaşı, the leader of CKMP, pulled out of the coalition government and formed a new party named Nation Party. Even after this split, however, the government could receive the vote of confidence.

== The government ==
Some of the cabinet members were changed during the lifespan of the cabinet. In the list below, the serving period of cabinet members who served only a part of the cabinets lifespan are shown in the column "Notes".

The cabinet members were as follows:

Title	Name	Party	Notes
Prime Minister	İsmet İnönü	CHP	
Deputy Prime Minister
Deputy Prime Minister	Turhan Feyzioğlu	CHP	
Deputy Prime Minister	Ekrem Alican	YTP	
Deputy Prime Minister	Hasan Dincer	CKMP	
Minister of State
Minister of State	Nihat Su	Indep.	
Minister of State	Hıfzı Oğuz Bekata; Ali Şakir Ağanoğlu; Vefik Pirinççioğlu	CHP	25 June 1962 – 18 October 1962; 1 November 1962 – 17 June 1963; 17 June 1963 – 25 December 1963
Minister of State	Raif Aybay	YTP	
Ministry of Justice	Abdülhak Kemal Yörük	CKMP	
Ministry of National Defense	İlhami Sancar	CHP	
Ministry of the Interior
Ministry of the Interior	Kemal Sahir Kurutluoğlu	Indep.	25 June 1962 – 10 October 1962
Ministry of the Interior	Hıfzı Oğuz Bekata	CHP	18 October 1962 – 8 October 1963
Ministry of the Interior	İlyas Seçkin	CHP	22 October 1963 – 25 December 1963
Ministry of Foreign Affairs	Feridun Cemal Erkin	Indep	
Ministry of Finance	Ferit Melen	Indep.	
Ministry of National Education
Ministry of National Education	Şevket Raşit Hatiboğlu	CHP	25 June 1962 – 12 June 1963
Ministry of National Education	İbrahim Ökten	CHP	12 June 1963 – 25 December 1963
Ministry of Public Works
Ministry of Public Works	İlyas Seçkin	CHP	25 June 1962 – 22 October 1963
Ministry of Public Works	Arif Hikmet Onat	CHP	22 October 1963 – 25 December 1963
Ministry of Commerce
Ministry of Commerce	Mehmet Muhlis Mete	CHP	25 June 1962 – 17 June 1963
Ministry of Commerce	Ahmet Oğuz	CKMP	17 June 1963 – 25 December 1963
Ministry of Health and Social Security
Ministry of Health and Social Security	Yusuf Azizoğlu	YTP	25 June 1962 – 27 November 1963
Ministry of Health and Social Security	Fahrettin Kerim Gökay	YTP	27 November 1963 – 25 December 1963
Ministry of Customs and Monopolies	Orhan Öztrak	CHP	
Ministry of Agriculture	Mehmet İzmen	YTP	
Ministry of Transport
Ministry of Transport	Rifat Öçten	YTP	25 June 1962 – 10 June 1983
Ministry of Transport	İhsan Şerif Dura	Indep.	13 June 1963 – 25 December 1963
Ministry of Labour and Social Security	Bülent Ecevit	CHP	
Ministry of Industry	Fethi Çelikbaş	CHP	
Ministry of Culture and Tourism
Ministry of Culture and Tourism	Celal Tevfik Karasapan	CKMP	25 June 1962 – 17 June 1963
Ministry of Culture and Tourism	Nurettin Ardıçoğlu	CKMP	17 June 1963 – 25 December 1963
Ministry of Construction and Settlement
Ministry of Construction and Settlement	Fahrettin Kerim Gökay	YTP	25 June 1962 – 27 November 1963
Ministry of Construction and Settlement	Hayri Mumcuoğlu	Indep.	27 November 1963 – 25 December 1963

== Aftermath ==
The local elections held on 17 November 1963 showed that the two smaller partners of the coalition were losing votes to the Justice Party (AP), the main opposition party. On 25 November, during İnönü's visit to the United States for the funeral of the late President John F. Kennedy, the coalition government disbanded.

Preceded by 26th government of Turkey (İsmet İnönü)	27th Government of Turkey; 25 June 1962 – 25 December 1963	Succeeded by 28th government of Turkey (İsmet İnönü)
