= Faik Öztrak (politician, born 1954) =

Turkish politician

Faik Öztrak MP
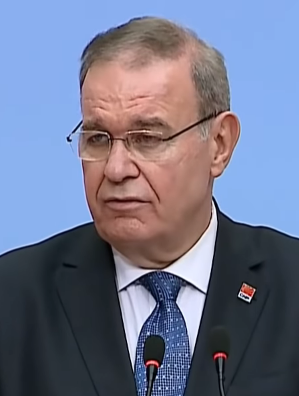
- Faik Öztrak in 2021

Deputy Leader of the Republican People's Party
- In office 18 December 2010 – 25 January 2015
- Leader: Kemal Kılıçdaroğlu

Member of the Grand National Assembly
- Incumbent
- Assumed office 22 July 2007
- Constituency: Tekirdağ (2007, 2011, June 2015, Nov 2015, 2018, 2023)

Personal details
- Born: 26 March 1954 (age 72) Ankara, Turkey
- Party: Republican People's Party
- Parent: Orhan Öztrak (father)
- Education: Ankara University; University of Birmingham
- Website: personal website

Faik Öztrak (born 26 March 1954) is a Turkish politician who served as the deputy leader of the Republican People's Party (CHP) from 2010 to 2015. He has been a Member of Parliament for the electoral district of Tekirdağ since 2007, having first been elected at the 2007 general election. He was re-elected in 2011, June 2015 and November 2015. Between 2010 and 2014, he served as the CHP's head accountant.

== Early life ==
=== Family ===
Faik Öztrak was born on 26 March 1954 as the son of Orhan Öztrak, a former minister of interior, in Ankara. He is the grandson of former interior minister Mustafa Faik Öztrak and the nephew of the TRT's first general secretary Adnan Öztrak and former chief advisor to the Presidency İlhan Öztrak.

=== Education ===
Öztrak studied at Lycée Saint-Joseph in Istanbul and graduated in 1973, later graduating from the Department of Economics and Finance at the Ankara University Faculty of Political Sciences in 1977. He received a master's degree at the University of Birmingham in the United Kingdom on the subject of financial development.

== Career ==
=== Bureaucratic career ===
In 1978, Öztrak joined the State Planning Organisation (DPT) as an assistant expert. Specialising on financial affairs, Öztrak was also involved in negotiations on an international scale. After 1987, he served as the President of the DPT's Annual Programs and Funding Department, Vice President of the Economic Planning Department, the General Manager of Economic Planning and also a deputy undersecretary. In 2000, he began working at the Banking Regulation and Supervision Institution and served as its vice president. Following the 2001 financial crash, he became part of the new team of economic policymakers and was appointed as the Undersecretary to the Treasury.

=== Academic career and journalism ===
After leaving the Treasury in 2003, Öztrak began writing as a columnist for the Milliyet newspaper twice a week on economic policies. He served as a visiting lecturer at the Middle East Technical University Department of Economics, teaching macroeconomics and stability programs. He also briefly taught at Bahçeşehir University. He also co-authored a paper on Turkey's accession to the European Union along with other experts from the Centre for European Policy Studies (CEPS).

=== Political career ===
Öztrak became a Member of Parliament for the electoral district of Tekirdağ since 2007, having first been elected at the 2007 general election. He was re-elected in 2011, June 2015 and November 2015. Between 2010 and 2014, he became the Deputy Leader of the CHP responsible for economic policy and was later appointed as Deputy Leader responsible for Trade Unions in 2014.

== See also ==
- List of Turkish civil servants
- Economy of Turkey
