= Seçkin Getbay =

Turkish footballer (born 1989)

Personal information
- Date of birth: 27 January 1989 (age 37)
- Place of birth: Altındağ, Turkey
- Height: 1.78 m (5 ft 10 in)
- Position: Midfielder

Team information
- Current team: Etimesgut Belediyespor
- Number: 20

Youth career
- 2003–2006: Gençlerbirliği

Senior career*
| Years | Team | Apps | (Gls) |
| 2006–2008 | Hacettepe | 8 | (0) |
| 2006–2007 | → Gençlerbirliği (loan) | 0 | (0) |
| 2007–2008 | → Fethiyespor (loan) | 20 | (2) |
| 2008–2012 | Gençlerbirliği | 0 | (0) |
| 2009 | → Giresunspor (loan) | 3 | (0) |
| 2009–2011 | → Hacettepe (loan) | 14 | (2) |
| 2011 | → Ünyespor (loan) | | |
| 2011–2012 | → Yeni Malatyaspor (loan) | 20 | (4) |
| 2012–2013 | Gaziosmanpaşaspor | 6 | (1) |
| 2013–2014 | Aydınspor 1923 | 30 | (3) |
| 2014–2015 | Göztepe | 6 | (0) |
| 2015 | Fethiyespor | 13 | (0) |
| 2015–2016 | Aydınspor 1923 | 27 | (4) |
| 2016–2017 | Sarıyer | 15 | (3) |
| 2017–2018 | Niğde Anadolu | 31 | (10) |
| 2018–2019 | Ankara Keçiörengücü | 20 | (2) |
| 2019–2021 | Uşakspor | 57 | (15) |
| 2021–2022 | Çorum | 9 | (1) |
| 2022 | Bodrumspor | 15 | (0) |
| 2022–2023 | Menemenspor | 14 | (0) |
| 2023 | Kastamonuspor 1966 | 5 | (0) |
| 2023– | Etimesgut Belediyespor | 15 | (0) |

International career^{‡}
| 2006 | Turkey U19 | 1 | (0) |
| 2008 | Turkey U20 | 2 | (0) |
| 2009 | Turkey U21 | 1 | (0) |
- * Club domestic league appearances and goals as of 10 February 2009 ‡ National team caps and goals as of 23 December 2023

Seckin Getbay (born 27 January 1989) is a Turkish footballer who plays for Etimesgut Belediyespor.
