= Hıfzı Oğuz Bekata =

Turkish lawyer and politician (1911–1995)

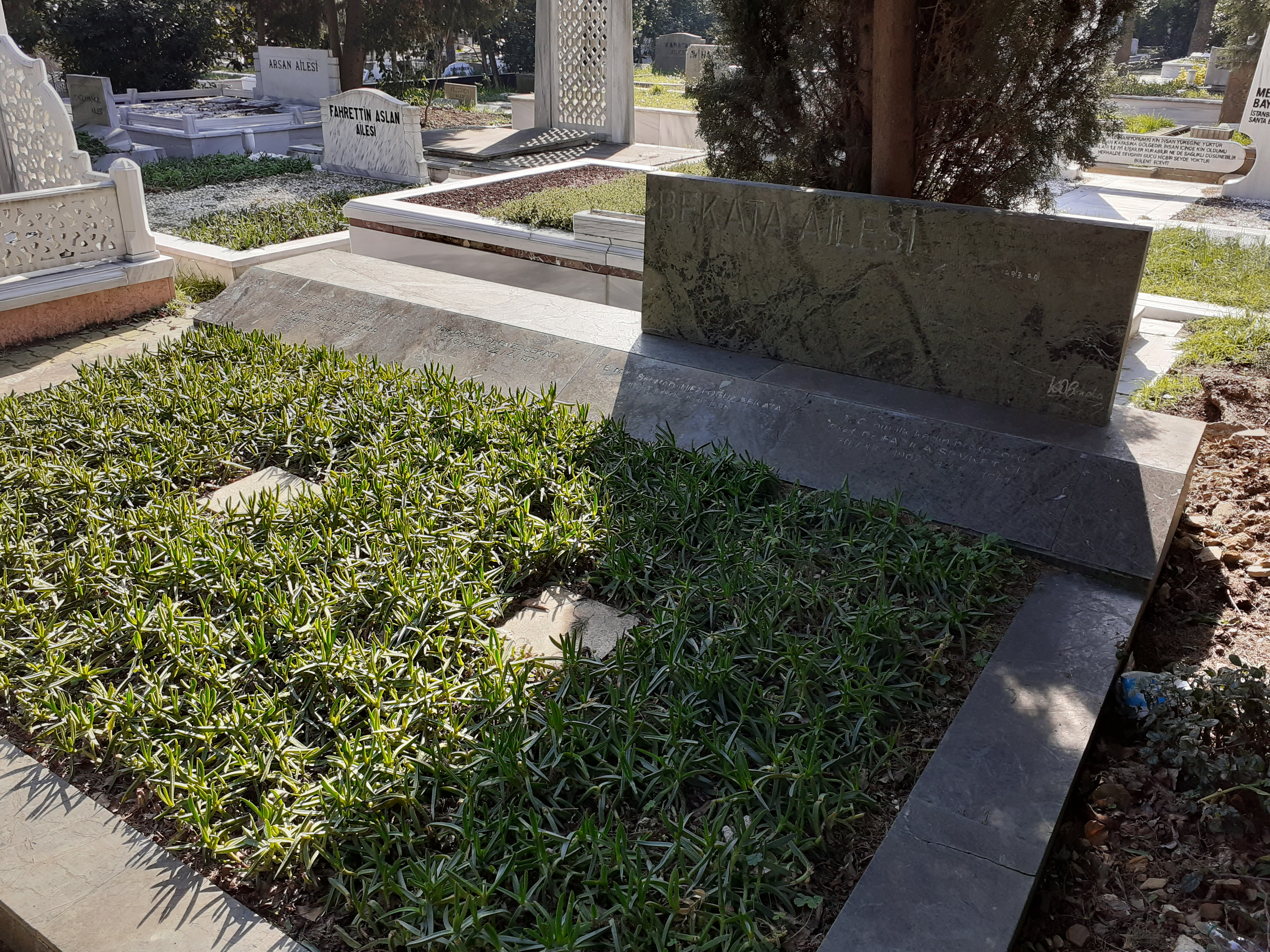
- His grave

Minister of Interior
- In office 17 October 1962 – 4 October 1963
- President: Cemal Gürsel
- Prime Minister: İsmet İnönü
- Preceded by: Sahir Kurtoğlu
- Succeeded by: İlyas Seçkin

Minister of State
- In office 25 June 1962 – 1962
- President: Cemal Gürsel
- Prime Minister: İsmet İnönü

Personal details
- Born: 17 March 1911 Ankara, Ottoman Empire
- Died: 1 September 1995 (aged 84)
- Party: Republican People's Party
- Children: 2
- Education: Ankara University

Hıfzı Oğuz Bekata (17 March 1911 – 1 September 1995) was a Turkish lawyer and politician who was a long-term deputy and senator for Republican People's Party. He was the minister of state and the minister of interior in the coalition cabinets led by İsmet İnönü in the early 1960s. He was also a journalist and poet.

== Early life and education ==
He was born in Ankara, Ottoman Empire, on 17 March 1911. He completed his secondary education at Bursa High School in 1931. He graduated from the Faculty of Law at Ankara University in 1935. While attending the university he established a cultural and youth magazine entitled Çığır (Turkish: Epoch) in 1933 which he edited and published until its closure in 1948.

== Career and activities ==
As of 1939 Bekata headed the language, history and literature branch of the People's Houses, a cultural organization. Then he worked at the Ministry of Economy and Trade in various posts. He became a member of the Republican People's Party in 1942 and was elected to the Parliament from Ankara in 1943. His tenure at the Parliament lasted until 1950. Then he worked as a freelance lawyer.

Bekata was again elected as a deputy in 1957 and served at the Parliament until 1960. Following the military coup on 27 May 1960 the rule of the Democrat Party ended, and a Constituent Assembly was formed. Bekata was made a member of the Assembly in 1961.

Bekata was appointed minister of state to the coalition cabinet formed by İsmet İnönü in 1961. He was reappointed to the post on 25 June 1962. Then he was named as the minister of interior in the next cabinet again led by İnönü on 17 October 1962, succeeding Sahir Kurtoğlu in the post. Bekata had to resign from the post on 4 October 1963 due to his conflict with the minister of health, Yusuf Azizoğlu, a member of the New Turkey Party. The tension occurred when Bekata accused Azizoğlu of collaborating with the Kurdish leaders. Bekata was also acting minister of defense in the same cabinet and served as the government spokesman. Bekata's successor as minister of interior was İlyas Seçkin.

Bekata was elected from Ankara as a senator in 1963 and held the post until 1975. He was among the opponents of the concept of the left of center which was discussed in the CHP congress held in October 1966. Then he joined the 76s group within the party which rejected the leftist policies.

Bekata published four books between 1960 and 1970 which were about politics in Turkey and foreign policy of Turkey. He contributed to various publications and also, wrote many poems.

== Personal life and death ==
Bekata was married and had two daughter. He died on 1 September 1995.

Bekata's library containing books on history of science, technology, engineering, philosophy of science, political sciences, history and philosophy was donated to Istanbul Technical University.
