= Cami Baykurt =

Turkish politician and diplomat (1877–1949)

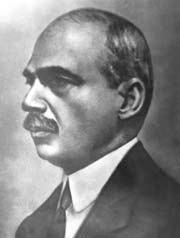

Deputy of Internal Affairs of the Turkish Grand National Assembly
- In office 3 May 1920 – 13 July 1920
- Preceded by: Office created
- Succeeded by: Hakkı Behiç Bayiç

Grand National Assembly of Turkey Member of parliament of the 1st term

Personal details
- Born: 1877 Istanbul, Ottoman Empire
- Died: 5 November 1949 (aged 71–72) Ankara, Turkey
- Education: Mekteb-i Harbiye
- Occupation: Soldier and politician

Military service
- Allegiance: Ottoman Army

Abdulkadir Cami Baykurt (1877, Istanbul – November 5, 1949, Istanbul) was a Turkish military officer and politician.

He served as the Minister of the Interior during the first two months of the First Executive Ministers Committee led by Mustafa Kemal Pasha in the 1st term of the Grand National Assembly. In this sense, he was the first Minister of the Interior in Turkey. He was known for his close views to Islamic socialism.

Before the Republic, he served as a soldier in the Tripolitania Province of the Ottoman Empire and left an important work about Ottoman Africa by writing his memoirs.

He was a founding member of Beşiktaş Gymnastics Club.

== Life ==
He was born in 1876. His birthplace is shown as Istanbul in various sources, but it is seen as Baghdad in a document in the archives of the Grand National Assembly. His father was Haci Mehmet Munir Pasha, and his mother was Ayse Hanım. His given name was "Abdulkadir." The name "Cami" was added to his name in honor of the famous Tripolitanian commander and governors, Recep Pasha, and he became known as Abdulkadir Cami. After the Surname Law, he took the surname "Baykurt."

He studied at Soğukçeşme Military Primary School, Kuleli Military High School, and the Military Academy. He joined the army after graduating from the Military Academy in 1896.

After graduation, he was assigned to Tripolitania, which was the farthest place of exile for the opponents of that time. Under the protection of Governor Müşir Recep Pasha, whom he served as an aide-de-camp, he organized young exiled students in the Committee of Union and Progress.

In 1905–1906, he was assigned to regain the Canet oasis in the south, which was occupied by the French. He stayed in Gat, where he served as both a commander and a sub-governor, for two years; he got to know the town and the Tevarik people living in the surrounding area closely. He kept intensive notes that would provide sources for his memoirs, which would be published long after his death. In his notes, he described the places, social life, characteristics of different ethnic groups, and animals.

During this period, in 1903, he was among the founders of Beşiktaş Gymnastics Club.

=== Political life ===
When the Second Constitutional Era was declared, he left the military as a captain and served as a deputy for Fizan in the Meclis-i Mebusan (Ottoman Chamber of Deputies) between 1908-1912 and in April–August 1912. He became one of the founders of the left-wing faction called Hizb-i Terakki within the Committee of Union and Progress. However, he left political activities that contradicted the general line of the Committee of Union and Progress; he worked as a journalist for a while.

During World War I, he was assigned as a censorship officer in Izmir. After the Armistice of Mudros, he returned to politics; he played a leading role in the establishment of the Defense of Rights Society in Izmir. He was elected as the representative of Aydın in the last Meclis-i Mebusan (Ottoman Chamber of Deputies); he served as the president of the Felah-ı Vatan group, which represented the Turkish National Movement, in the parliament. On March 16, 1920, during the occupation of Istanbul by the British, he fled to Ankara.

Entering the first Grand National Assembly as a deputy from Aydın, Cami Bey was elected to the temporary Executive Committee on April 25, 1920. He served as the Minister of the Interior for a short period from May 3 to July 13, 1920. Due to his left-wing views, he had some differences of opinion with Mustafa Kemal Pasha.

Abdulkadir Cami Bey, who was sent to Rome as a representative of the Grand National Assembly, served in this position for a few months. On April 27, 1922, he was informed that his representative duty was over; when he did not return, he was considered to have resigned, and his deputyship ended. Nevertheless, when invited to the London Conference of the Grand National Assembly, he participated as part of the existing cadre.

=== Later period ===
After Atatürk's death, Cami Baykurt returned to the country and worked as a columnist in some newspapers until his death. His articles were published in Dikmen and Görüşler magazines and Tan newspaper starting from 1945. His newspaper Yeni Dünya could only be published for five issues. His desire to establish the Turkey Workers' Peasants' Socialist Party could not be realized.

He taught history at Robert College and French at Erenköy Girls' High School.

After the transition to the multi-party system, in 1948, he led the establishment initiative of the Human Rights Association by a group including Marshal Fevzi Çakmak.

He died on November 5, 1949.

== Notable works ==
- Trablusgarp’tan Sahra-yı Kebire Doğru, 1910.
- Osmanlılığın Atisi, Düşmanları ve Dostları, 1913.
- Osmanlı Ülkesinde Hristiyan Türkler, 1922; 1932; 2007, Karma Kitaplar).
- Son Osmanlı Afrikası'nda Hayat, Türkiye İş Bankası Kültür Yayınları, 2009, ISBN 978-9944-88-722-9.
