= İlyas Seçkin =

Turkish politician

Ministry of Public Works
- In office 25 June 1962 – 22 October 1963
- Prime Minister: İsmet İnönü
- Preceded by: Emin Paksüt
- Succeeded by: Arif Hikmet Onat

Ministry of Interior
- In office 22 October 1963 – 25 December 1963
- Prime Minister: İsmet İnönü
- Preceded by: Hıfzı Oğuz Bekata
- Succeeded by: Orhan Öztrak

Personal details
- Born: 1918 Ayaş, Ankara Province, Ottoman Empire
- Died: 17 December 1996 (aged 77–78)
- Party: Republican People's Party (CHP)
- Children: 2
- Education: Political Sciences, Law
- Alma mater: Ankara University
- Occupation: Politician

İlyas Seçkin (1918 – 17 December 1996) was a Turkish civil servant, lawyer, politician and former government minister.

== Early life and education ==
İlyas Seçkin was born in Ayaş ilçe (district) of Ankara Province, Ottoman Empire in 1918. He graduated from the Faculty of Political Science and the Faculty of Law at Ankara University. In 1942, he began serving for the Ministry of Finance. In 1948, while he was an account expert, he resigned from his post at the ministry to work as a free-lance lawyer.

== Career ==
Seçkin joined the Republican People's Party (CHP), and between 1957 and 1969 he served as a deputy from Ankara Province in the 11th, 12th and 13th parliaments. He became a member of the 27th government of Turkey. Between 25 June 1962 and 22 October 1963, he served as the Minister of Public Works. Following a government reshuffle, he was appointed as the Minister of Interior, serving until 25 December 1963.

Seçkin was married and father of two. He died on 17 December 1996.
