= Tekirdağ (electoral district) =

Electoral district for the Grand National Assembly of Turkey

Coordinates: 41°00′N 27°30′E

- electoral district for the Grand National Assembly of Turkey
- Tekirdağ shown within Turkey
- Province: Tekirdağ
- Electorate: 582,567

Current electoral district
- Created: 1920
- Seats: 6 Historical: 5 (1995-2011) 4 (1961-1995) 6 (1954-1961)
- MPs: List: Faik Öztrak CHP Candan Yüceer CHP Emre Köprülü CHP Tevfik Ziyaeddin Akbulut AKP Özlem Yemişçi AKP Bülent Belen MHP
- Turnout at last election: 89,31%
- Representation
- CHP: 3 / 6
- AK Party: 2 / 6
- MHP: 1 / 6

Tekirdağ is an electoral district of the Grand National Assembly of Turkey. It elects 6 members of parliament (deputies) to represent the province of the same name for a four-year term by the D'Hondt method, a party-list proportional representation system.

== Members ==
Population reviews of each electoral district are conducted before each general election, which can lead to certain districts being granted a smaller or greater number of parliamentary seats. The number of seats allocated to Tekirdağ has hovered between four and six for the past sixty years.

MPs for Tekirdağ, 1999 onwards
| Seat | 1999 (21st parliament) | 2002 (22nd parliament) | 2007 (23rd parliament) | 2011 (24th parliament) | June 2015 (25th parliament) |
| MP | Ahmet Zamantılı; DSP | Erdoğan Kaplan; CHP | Faik Öztrak; CHP | | |
| MP | Bayram Fırat Dayanıklı; DSP | Enis Tütüncü; CHP | | Candan Yüceer; CHP | |
| MP | No seat | | | Emre Köprülü; CHP | |
| MP | Fevzi Aytekin; DSP | Tevfik Ziyaeddin Akbulut; AK Party | | | Mustafa Yel; AK Party |
| MP | Enis Sülün; Anavatan | Ahmet Kambur; AK Party | Necip Taylan; AK Party | Özlem Yemişçi; AK Party | Ayşe Doğan; AK Party |
| MP | Nihan İlgün; DYP | Mehmet Nuri Saygun; CHP | Kemalettin Nalcı; MHP | Bülent Belen; MHP | |

== General elections ==
=== 2011 ===
2011 Turkish general election: Tekirdağ
| Party | Candidate | Votes | % | ±% |
|---|---|---|---|---|
| CHP | Faik Öztrak, Candan Yüceer, Emre Köprülü | 226,824 | 44.41 | |
| AK Party | Yevfik Ziyaeddin Akbulut, Özlem Yemişçi | 183,548 | 35.94 | |
| MHP | Bülent Belen | 68,483 | 13.41 | |
| Independent | Kerem Tosun | 8001 | 1.57 | |
| HAS Party | None elected | 3935 | 0.77 | N/A |
| DP | None elected | 3765 | 0.74 | |
| HEPAR | None elected | 3692 | 0.72 | |
| SAADET | None elected | 3373 | 1.66 | |
| DSP | None elected | 2998 | 0.59 | '"`UNIQ−−ref−00000011−QINU`"' |
| Büyük Birlik | None elected | 2333 | 0.46 | |
| Labour | None elected | 1624 | 0.32 | |
| TKP | None elected | 967 | 0.19 | |
| MP | None elected | 480 | 0.09 | |
| Nationalist Conservative | None elected | 478 | 0.09 | |
| Liberal Democrat | None elected | 231 | 0.051 | |
| DYP | None elected | 0 | | |
| Turnout | | 510,732 | 89.31 | |

=== June 2015 ===
| Abbr. | Party | Votes | % |
|---|---|---|---|
| CHP | Republican People's Party | 253,295 | 44.5% |
| AK Party | Justice and Development Party | 177,458 | 31.2% |
| MHP | Nationalist Movement Party | 86,333 | 15.2% |
| HDP | Peoples' Democratic Party | 31,543 | 5.5% |
| | Other | 20,750 | 3.6% |
| Total | | 569,379 | |
| Turnout | | 87.49% | |
source: YSK

=== November 2015 ===
| Abbr. | Party | Votes | % |
|---|---|---|---|
| CHP | Republican People's Party | 267,409 | 45.7% |
| AK Party | Justice and Development Party | 217,582 | 37.2% |
| MHP | Nationalist Movement Party | 60,056 | 10.3% |
| HDP | Peoples' Democratic Party | 25,472 | 4.4% |
| | Other | 14,961 | 2.6% |
| Total | | 585,480 | |
| Turnout | | 88.06% | |
source: YSK

=== 2018 ===
| Abbr. | Party | Votes | % |
|---|---|---|---|
| CHP | Republican People's Party | 248,539 | 38.6% |
| AK Party | Justice and Development Party | 216,811 | 33.6% |
| IYI | Good Party | 76,707 | 11.9% |
| MHP | Nationalist Movement Party | 47,860 | 7.4% |
| HDP | Peoples' Democratic Party | 40,274 | 6.2% |
| | Other | 14,302 | 2.2% |
| Total | | 644,493 | |
| Turnout | | 89.24% | |
source: YSK

== Presidential elections ==
=== 2014 ===
Presidential Election 2014: Tekirdağ
| Party | Candidate | Votes | % |
|---|---|---|---|
| Independent | Ekmeleddin İhsanoğlu | 291,069 | 57.37 |
| AK Party | Recep Tayyip Erdoğan | 193,905 | 38.22 |
| HDP | Selahattin Demirtaş | 22,390 | 4.41 |
| Total votes | | 507,364 | 100.00 |
| Rejected ballots | | 7,580 | 1.47 |
| Turnout | | 514,944 | 79.81 |
| Ekmeleddin İhsanoğlu win | | | |
