= Orhan Öztrak =

Turkish politician (1914–1995)

Minister of Customs and Monopolies
- In office 1977–1975
- President: Fahri Korutürk
- Prime Minister: Süleyman Demirel

Minister of Interior
- In office 26 December 1963 – 20 February 1965
- President: Cemal Gürsel
- Prime Minister: İsmet İnönü
- Preceded by: İlyas Seçkin
- Succeeded by: Hakkı Akdoğan

Minister of Customs and Monopolies
- In office 25 June 1962 – 1963
- President: Cemal Gürsel
- Prime Minister: İsmet İnönü

Personal details
- Born: 1914 Malkara, Tekirdağ, Ottoman Empire
- Died: 30 December 1995 (aged 80–81)
- Party: Republican People's Party; Reliance Party
- Children: 2, including Faik Öztrak
- Parent: Mustafa Faik Öztrak (father)
- Education: Ankara University; University of Neuchâtel

Orhan Öztrak (1914–1995) was a Turkish jurist and politician who served as the minister of interior and the minister of customs and monopolies. He was a member of the Parliament and of the Senate.

== Early life and education ==
He was born in Malkara, Tekirdağ, in 1914. He hailed from a family of which members are politicians and bureaucrats. His father was Mustafa Faik Öztrak who was the minister of interior. His brother, Adnan Öztrak, was the first director general of the Turkish Radio and Television Corporation between 1964 and 1971. His younger brother İlhan Öztrak served as the minister of state.

Orhan Öztrak obtained a law degree from Ankara University. He received his Ph.D. in law from the University of Neuchâtel.

== Career and activities ==
After working as a district governor Öztrak was elected to the Parliament in the 1957 general election for the Republican People's Party (CHP) from Tekirdağ. Following the military coup on 27 May 1960 a Constituent Assembly was formed. Öztrak was the Tekirdağ representative for the CHP at the Assembly from 6 January 1961 to 15 October 1961. He worked as a member of the CHP Central Administrative Board and was the party's deputy general secretary. He was named as the minister of customs and monopolies to the cabinet led by İsmet İnönü on 25 June 1962.

Öztrak was appointed minister of interior to the same cabinet on 26 December 1963, replacing İlyas Seçkin in the post. Öztrak's tenure ended on 20 February 1965 when Hakkı Akdoğan was named as the minister of interior. Öztrak was part of the group led by Turhan Feyzioğlu in the CHP who argued in 1965 that the concept of the left of center was a way to make a distinction between the CHP followers and the followers of the Workers' Party of Turkey.

Öztrak resigned from the CHP on 30 April 1967 and was involved in the establishment of the Reliance Party. Later he was made its general secretary. He was a representative of Turkey at the European Parliament from 17 April 1970 to 28 January 1971.

Öztrak served as minister of customs and monopolies in the cabinet led by Süleyman Demirel between 1975 and 1977. Öztrak was a senator from Tekirdağ from 1975 to 1980.

== Personal life and death ==
Öztrak was married and had two children, including Faik Öztrak, a member of the CHP.

Öztrak died on 30 December 1995.
