= Faik Öztrak (politician, born 1882) =

Turkish politician (1882–1951)

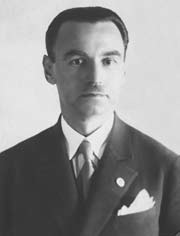

Member of the Grand National Assembly

Personal details
- Born: 1882 Tekirdağ, Ottoman Empire
- Died: 30 May 1951 Ankara, Turkey

M. Faik Öztırak (1882, Tekirdağ, Ottoman Empire – 30 May 1951, Ankara, Turkey) was a Turkish bureaucrat and politician. He is the grandfather of bureaucrat Faik Öztrak.

== Biography ==
His father's name is Ali and his mother's name is Naime. In 1906, he completed his graduation in Istanbul. In the same year, he was appointed to Edirne. Çorlu, Sofulu, Keşan, and Uzunköprü, as he worked in the district offices. Later, he became the governor of the villages of Nablus (Jordan), Denizli. During the Turkish War of Independence, he founded the Menderes defense line in Sarayköy. He joined the Turkish National Movement when he was the governor of Denizli, and helped the Kuvay-ı Milliye units in the region.

He was elected to the Grand National Assembly of Turkey (TBMM) on 23 April 1920 as deputy of Adana. He was elected a deputy of Tekirdağ in 1923 and in the years to come. Between 1939 and 1942, he was the deputy interior minister and deputy chairman of the Turkish parliament.

Öztrak's sons included Adnan, Orhan and İlhan.
