= Rams Park =

Association football stadium in Sarıyer, Turkey

Ali Sami Yen Sports Complex
- Aslantepe (Lion's Hill)
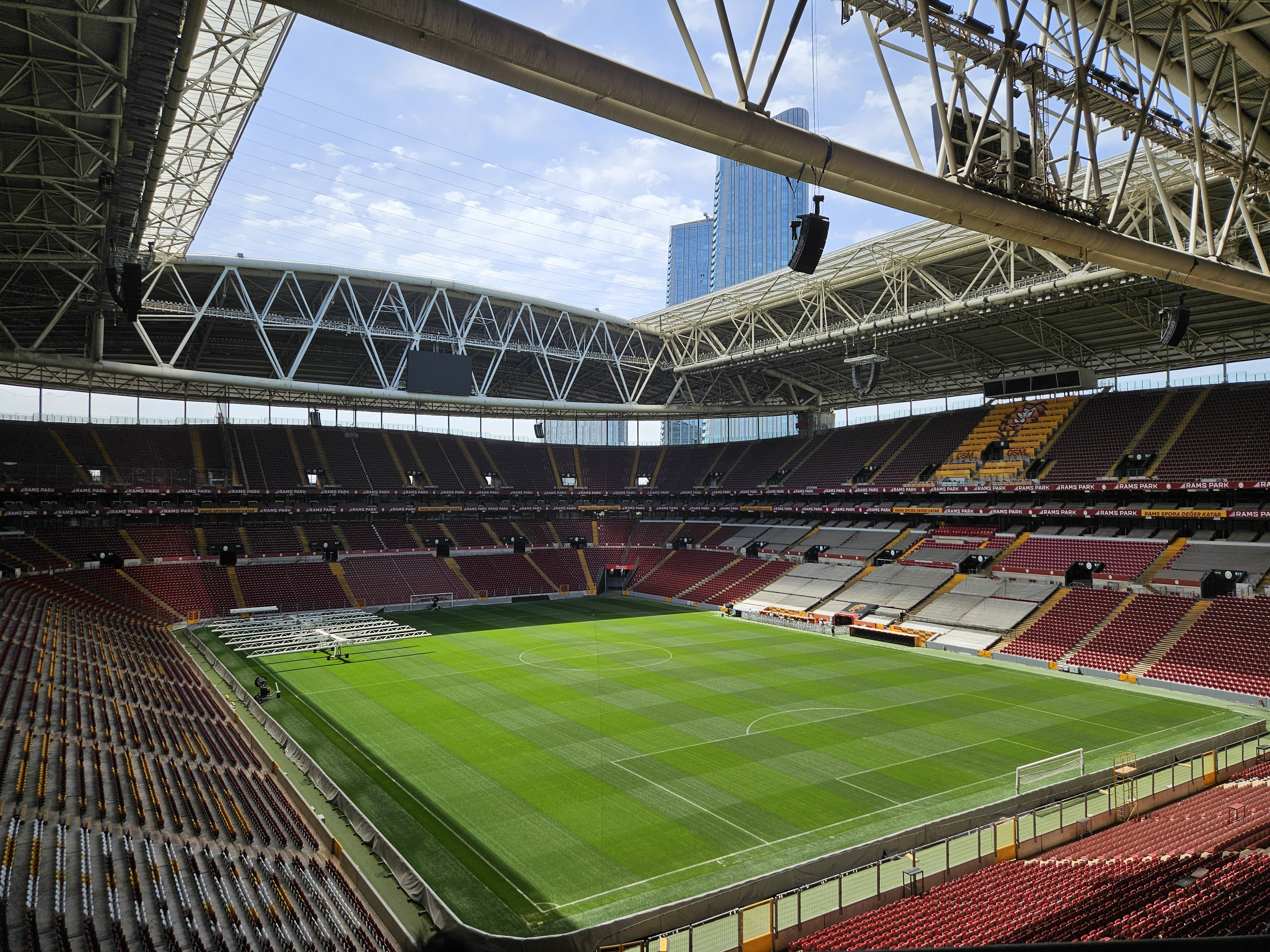
- UEFA

- Location in Istanbul Location in Turkey
- Full name: Ali Sami Yen Spor Kompleksi
- Former names: List: Türk Telekom Arena (2011–2017) Türk Telekom Stadium (2017–2021) Nef Stadium (2021–2023)
- Location: Sarıyer, Istanbul, Turkey
- Coordinates: 41°6′10″N 28°59′26″E
- Owner: Galatasaray
- Operator: Galatasaray
- Capacity: 53,387 Capacity history: 52,695 (2011–2013) 52,280 (2013–2023) 53,978 (2023–2026) 53,387 (2026–)
- Executive suites: 221
- Surface: Grass (2011–2018); SISGrass
- Scoreboard: 2 x 240m²
- Record attendance: 53,755 (Fenerbahçe, 19 May 2024)
- Field size: 105 m × 68 m (115 yd × 74 yd)
- Acreage: 190,000 m²
- Public transit: Seyrantepe

Construction
- Groundbreaking: 13 December 2007; 18 years ago
- Built: 2007–2011
- Opened: 15 January 2011; 15 years ago
- Cost: US$250 million ($358 million in 2025 dollars)
- Architect: 'asp' architekten Stuttgart
- Structural engineers: İz Mühendislik; Yüksel Proje; Schlaich Bergermann & Partner
- Services engineer: OBERMEYER: Planungsgesellschaft
- Main contractor: Varyap Uzunlar Ortak Girişimi TOKİ

Tenants
- Galatasaray (2011–present); Turkey national football team (selected matches)

Ali Sami Yen Sports Complex (Turkish: Ali Sami Yen Spor Kompleksi), commonly known as Ali Sami Yen Stadium, branded as Rams Park for sponsorship reasons, is a football stadium serving as the home ground of the Süper Lig club Galatasaray. It is located in the Seyrantepe quarter of the Sarıyer district, on the European side of Istanbul, Türkiye. The all-seater stadium has the capacity to host 53,387 spectators during football games. Rams Park is part of the Ali Sami Yen Sports Complex, named after the club's founder.

Rams Park was the first stadium in Turkey that met the UEFA Euro 2016 requirements during the country's bid to host the European Championship. In 2011, Rams Park was one of the six nominees for the Venue of the Year and New Venue categories of the Stadium Business Awards. Galatasaray S.K. won the Süper Lig in the first full season at Rams Park. Rams Park and Galatasaray S.K. were mentioned in the first chapter of Tom Clancy's 2012 novel Threat Vector.

Rams Park is one of the potential venues for the UEFA Euro 2032.

In 2025, Ali Sami Yen Spor Kompleksi Rams Park ranked second on the World Economic Forum's list of the world's seven most environmentally friendly stadiums.

== History ==
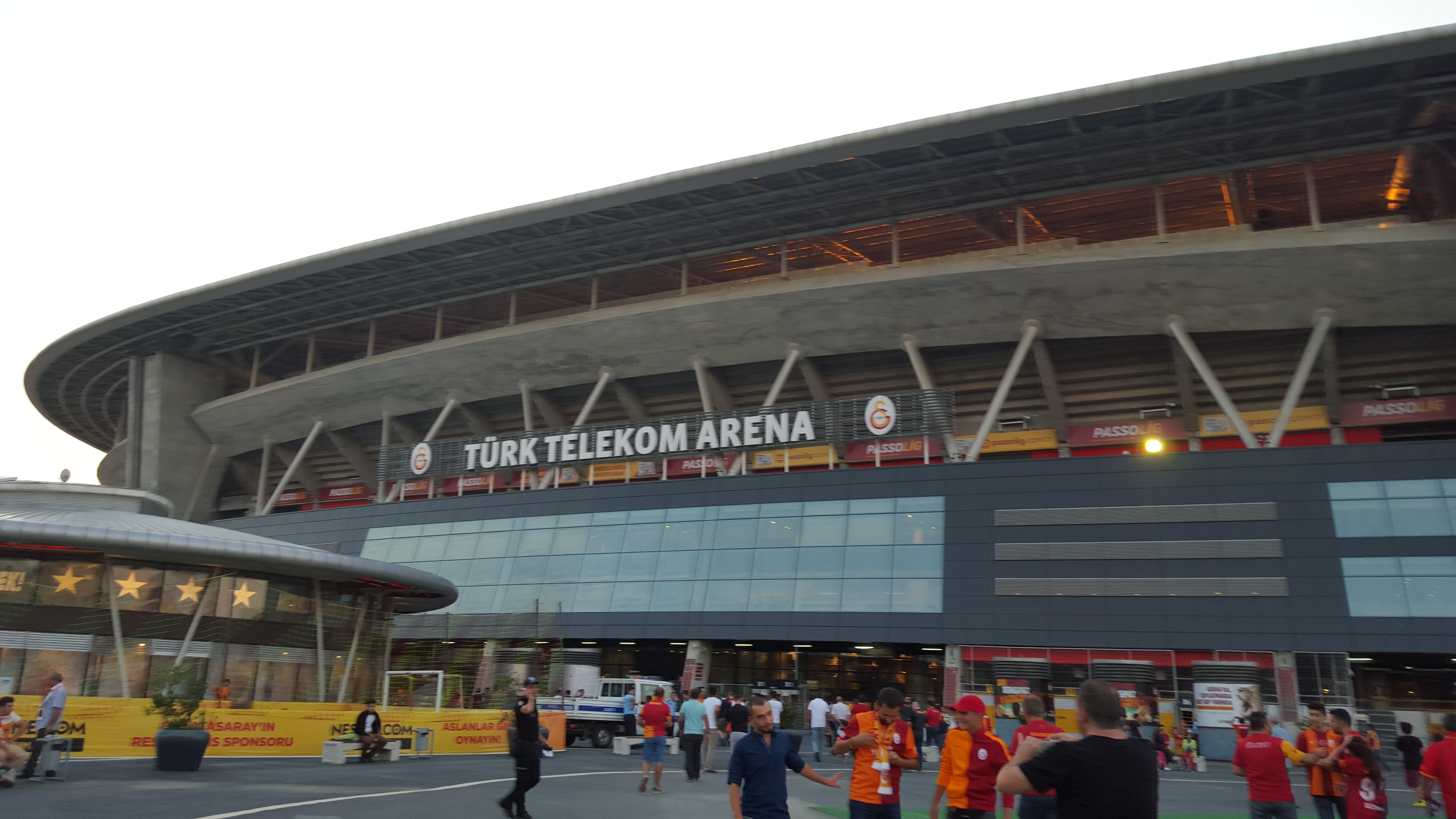
Exterior of the stadium

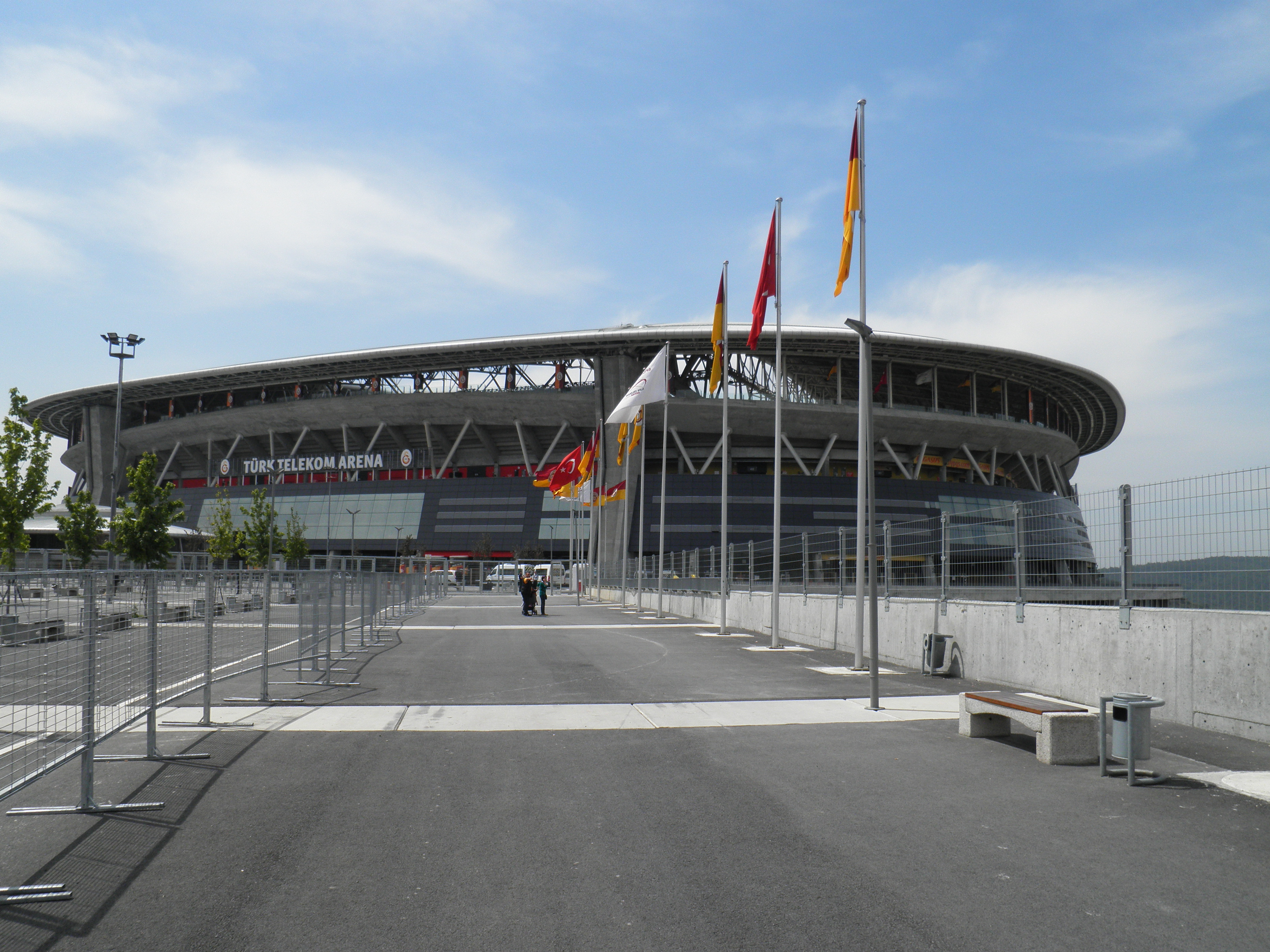
Main road to the stadium

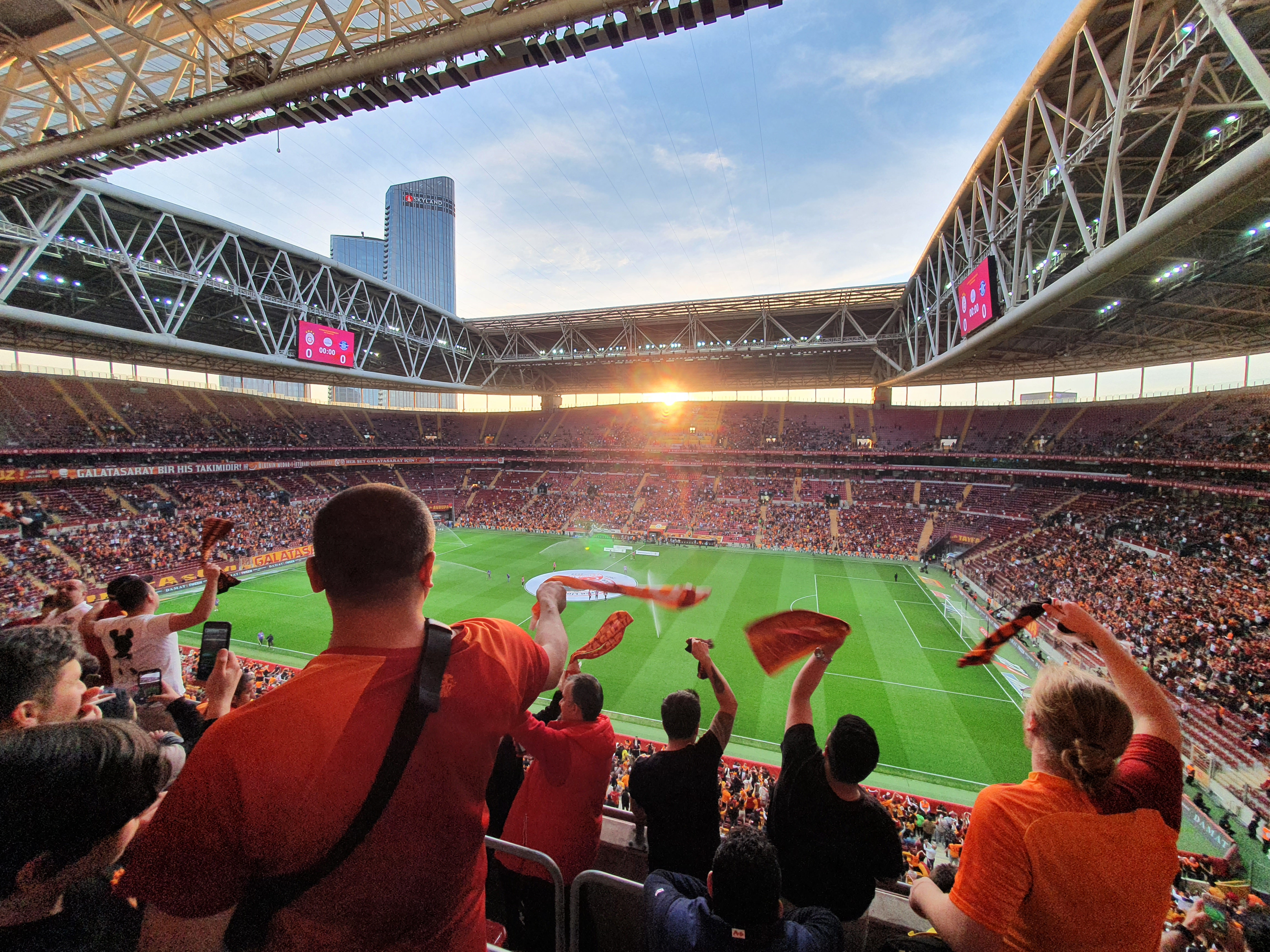
Interior view of the stadium (Before the kick-off of the match played between Galatasaray and Adana Demirspor on May 16, 2022)

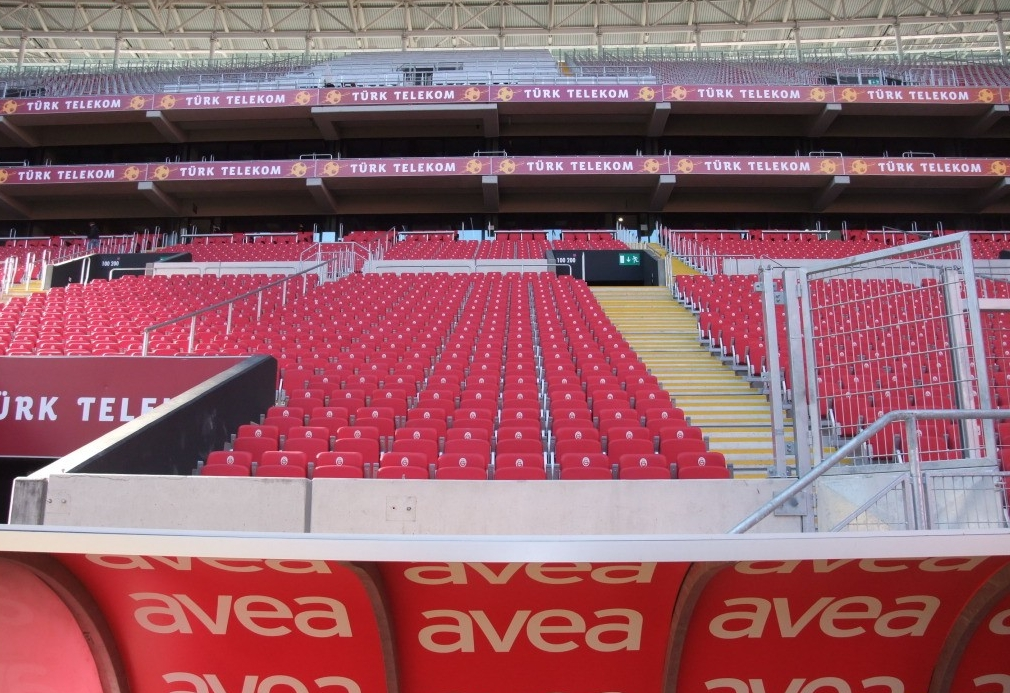
VIP Seats and suite levels

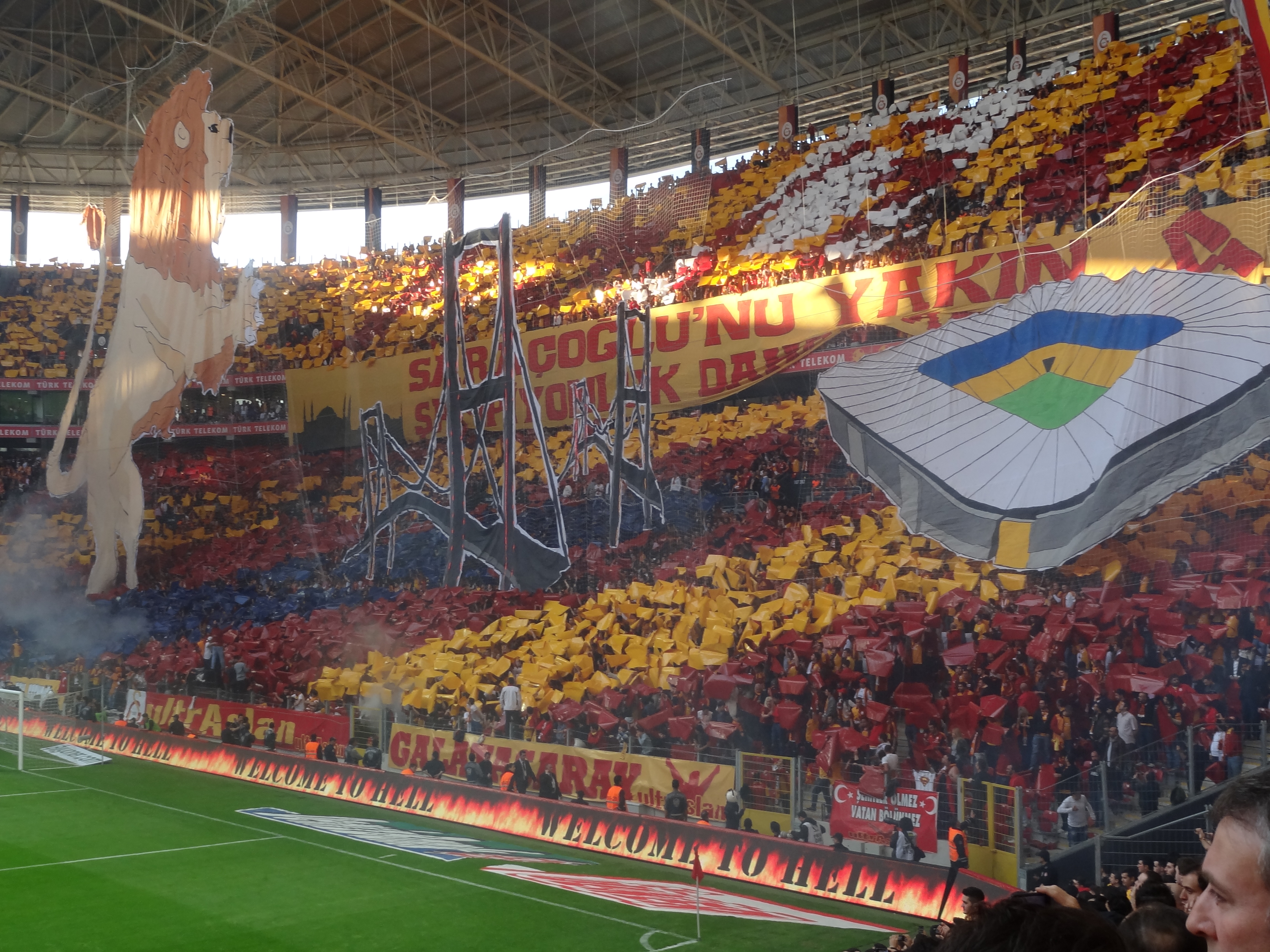
Galatasaray fans teasing their arch-rival Fenerbahçe. The matches between the two teams are known as the Intercontinental Derby.

Association football was first played in Istanbul by some British players in a field known as Papazın Çayırı ("Priest's Field") in the area that is now the site of Fenerbahçe's Şükrü Saracoğlu Stadium. With the opening of the Taksim Stadium in 1921, it was this new stadium that became the new football headquarters. In the urban development of 1939, the military barracks in which the Taksim Stadium was located was demolished in 1940. The stadium was thus lost. During this period, Fenerbahçe bought the land encompassing Papazın Çayırı and built the Fenerbahçe Stadium, while the Beşiktaş Club moved into the Şeref Stadium, located in the area where today's Çırağan Palace Hotel stands. It was Galatasaray that experienced the biggest problem with the use of a stadium in that period.

The first steps to overcome this problem were taken in the initial years of the 1930s. The first initiative to acquire a plot of land for Galatasaray was in 1933, when the then president of the club Ali Haydar Barşal showed an interest in a mulberry orchard in Mecidiyeköy. In the period between 1933 and 1935, negotiations with the government resulted in the allocation of a plot of land outside of the city limits in Mecidiye Köyü (Mecidiye Village, present-day Mecidiyeköy quarter of the Şişli district) for a stadium to be built for Galatasaray. Excavations for the construction began in 1936. The President of the Turkish Sports Organization at the time, Adnan Menderes, provided financial assistance for the project. However, the efforts were left in the excavation stage.

In 1940, the matter of the stadium came up again under the presidency of Tevfik Ali Çınar. The same plot of land was leased to Galatasaray for a term of 30 years at a symbolic yearly rental fee of 1 lira. Galatasaray thus acquired the right to the use of the land. In leasing the land, Galatasaray committed to building a modern stadium as well as a bicycle velodrome. The construction could not start, however, due to limited funds and the general atmosphere of the war years. In 1943, Osman Dardağan led an initiative to build a modest stadium that would answer the immediate need. In the atmosphere of war, only a small open tribune was allowed in the stadium, which was set on a field of earth and inaugurated under the presidency of Muslihittin Peykoğlu in 1945. However, its distance from the city center in those days, its inaccessibility by public transportation, and the rough winds that characterized the district were factors that contributed to a long period in which the stadium would lay idle and football games never took place.

When the İnönü Stadium in the center of the city was opened in that period, Galatasaray abandoned the stadium building project in Mecidiyeköy, putting the project aside before fruition. In 1955, 30 more years were added to the right of utilization agreement, which at the time had 22 years to go, extending the terms until 2007. When the Club failed to undertake the building of the Stadium, the project was taken on by the Physical Education General Directorate. The construction started in 1959. In 1961, during the presidency of Refik Selimoğlu, a new agreement was signed with the Physical Education General Directorate whereby the utilization rights of the newly completed stadium were explicitly given to Galatasaray.

The stadium was opened on an eventful December 20, 1964. In the midst of the extreme crowds present, panic broke out, resulting in the death of one spectator and the injury of 80 others. In 1965, the stadium was illuminated for the first time. Despite this, however, not many night games were played. At the beginning of the 1970s, the stadium was abandoned for another period during which the İnönü Stadium began to be used again. In the 1970s, the stadium was mostly used by Galatasaray for training sessions. In those years, it remained in a squalid state of neglect.

In 1981, grass was planted on the field and the stadium was opened again. The lighting system was renewed in 1993, after which night games began to be played once more. In the same year, the system of combined tickets was initiated in Turkey at the Ali Sami Yen Stadium. Also in the same year, the stadium was furnished with seats to replace the old benches. The capacity of the stadium was thus reduced from 35,000 to an all-seater capacity of 22,000. In 1997, the Galatasaray administration assigned a Canadian architectural firm for the task of designing Turkey's first multi-function, modern stadium to be built in place of the Ali Sami Yen Stadium, which was planned to be torn down.

On 10 December 2013, a UEFA Champions League match between Galatasaray and Juventus had to be abandoned due to heavy snow in the 32nd minute with the score 0–0, the remaining minutes of the match were played the next day.

=== New stadium projects ===
==== Faruk Süren project ====
The new stadium project was launched in 1998 and it attracted wide interest. During the promotion of the modern loge system, the entire loge section was sold at a symbolical fee. The proposed capacity was 40,484. However, the mayor and the state did not allow of a stadium to be built.

==== Mehmet Cansun project ====
Over the period of 2001–2002, a revision was made in the project with an eye toward reducing the amount needed for financing but this time, although costs were brought down, the economic crisis of 2001 stood in the way of overcoming the financial issue. Capacity was reduced to 35,000.

==== Özhan Canaydın: Back to Süren's project ====
In the 2002–04 season, the old project came up again but was abandoned in favor of building a new and modern stadium. Again, financing needs could not be met. After a general renovation that took place in the 2004–05 season, the club returned to the Ali Sami Yen Stadium. Following the 1999 İzmit earthquake, the old Open Tribune was demolished and replaced in the 2005–2006 season for safety reasons.

==== Özhan Canaydın: Leaving Mecidiyeköy, new home in Aslantepe ====
Because Mecidiyeköy was now a part of the city center, state authorities objected to the expansion of the stadium in this district. A new piece of land was suggested to Galatasaray as an alternative.

The search for financing for the new stadium that would be built on this new plot continued over the period of 2004–07. In 2007, discussions with state authorities regarding the erection of a new Galatasaray stadium in Aslantepe yielded positive results. It was decided that the new stadium would be built within two years on the new land plot that would be transferred to Galatasaray, in exchange for the club's property in Mecidiyeköy on which the Ali Sami Yen Stadium stood.

==== A dream comes true ====
At the end of 2007, ten years after the initial announcement of the project in 1997, the groundbreaking for the new stadium was carried out (December 13, 2007) at a ceremony attended by state officials. The old project was put aside and a new project was contracted to Mete Arat in Germany. 2008, In Galatasaray's last year at the Ali Sami Yen Stadium, the Lower Closed Tribune was renovated in line with UEFA standards. 2009, The construction of the new stadium, the Rams Park, gained speed when the contracting company was changed. 2010, It was announced that the official opening of the new stadium would take place on January 15, 2011, with Prime Minister Recep Tayyip Erdoğan presiding. But in the opening ceremony, he was protested by spectators of Galatasaray.

==== Project overview ====
Project	Year	Location	Capacity	Suites	Architect	Cost	Info
Faruk Süren project	1997–2001	Mecidiyeköy	40,482	125+72 boxes without outside seating	BBB Architects	US$118.5 million ($234 million in 2025 dollars)	2 different roof and stand styles. A Mall next to the stadium was also planned
Mehmet Cansun project	2001	Mecidiyeköy	35,000	132	GS member Architecture group*	US$35 million ($63.6 million in 2025 dollars)	*Emre Arolat, Doğan Hasol, Tabanlioglu Architects, Eren Talu, DB Architects
Özhan Canaydın:Back to Süren's project	2002–2005	Mecidiyeköy	40,482	125+72 boxes without outside seating	BBB Architects	US$90 million ($158 million in 2025 dollars)	Same project, just lower cost
Eren Talu bidding project	2007	Aslantepe	52,000	150	Populous	n/a	Eren Talu's project for the bid. GS logo as a ramp
Özhan Canaydın project	2007	Aslantepe	52,652	157	asp Stuttgart	US$250 million ($358 million in 2025 dollars)	Built

== Aslantepe ==
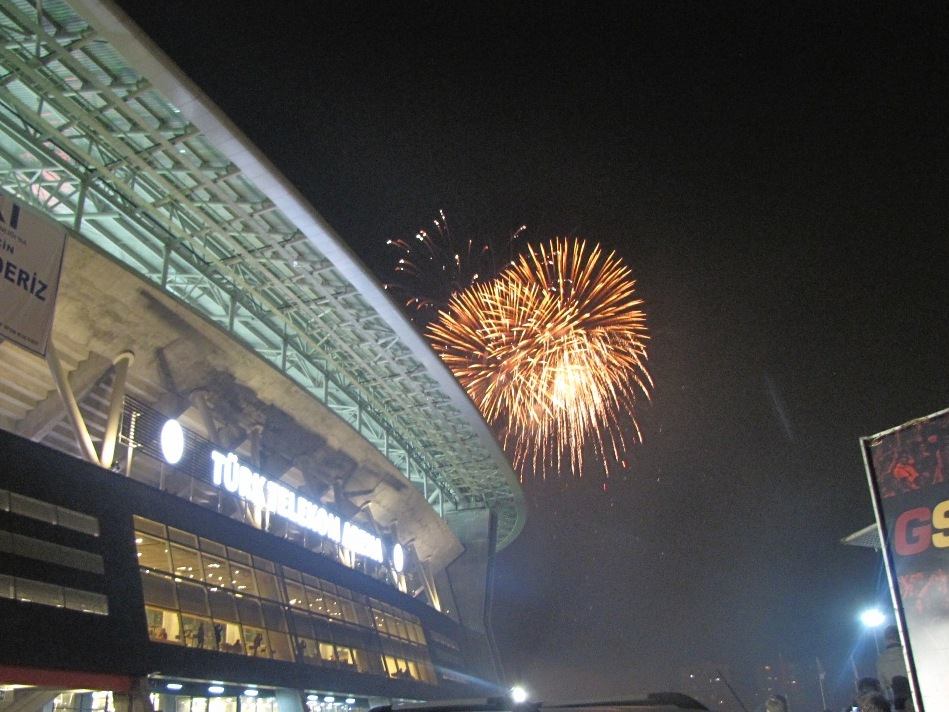
Exterior view

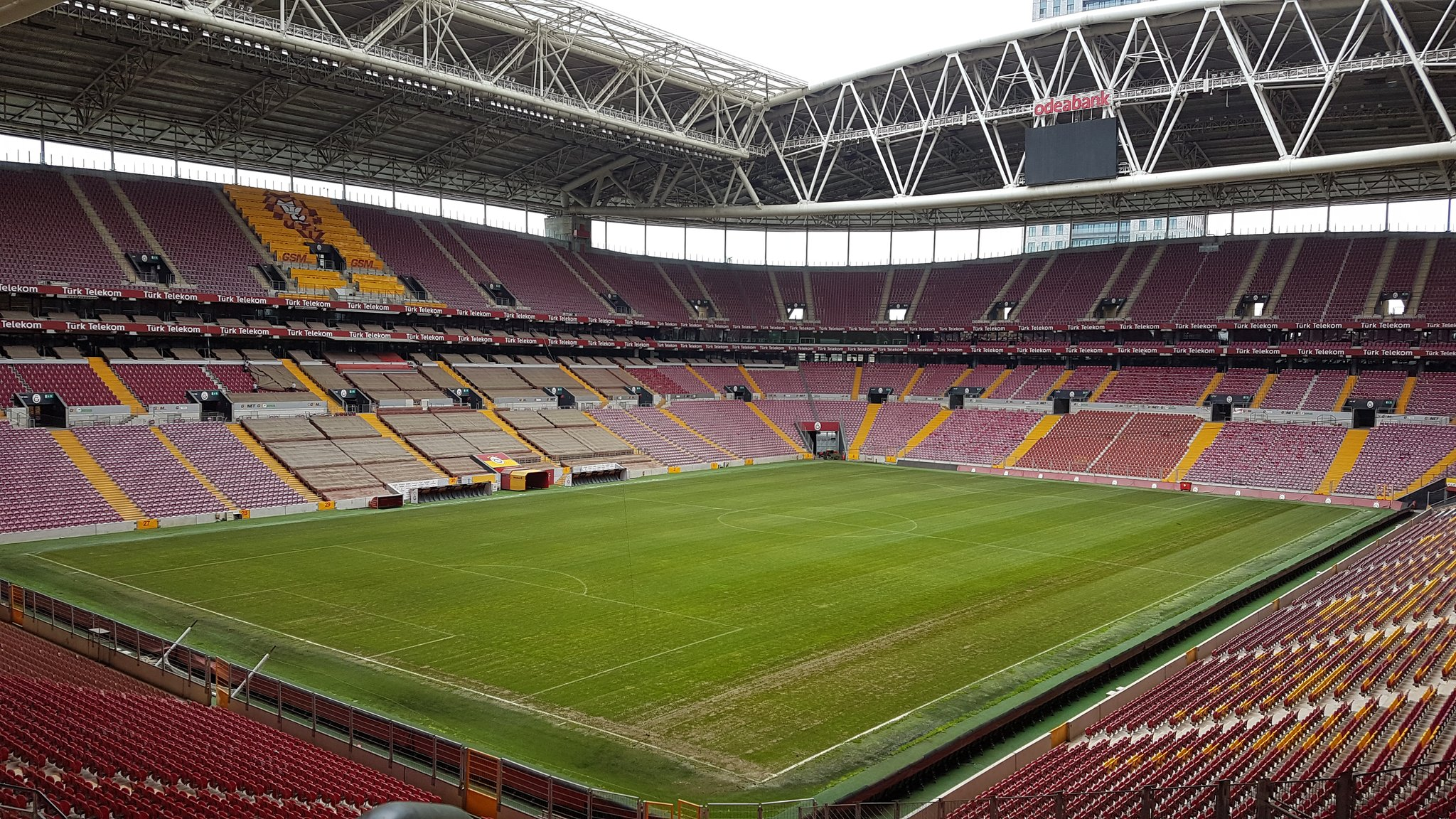
View of the stadium from the southeast stand corner, June 2017

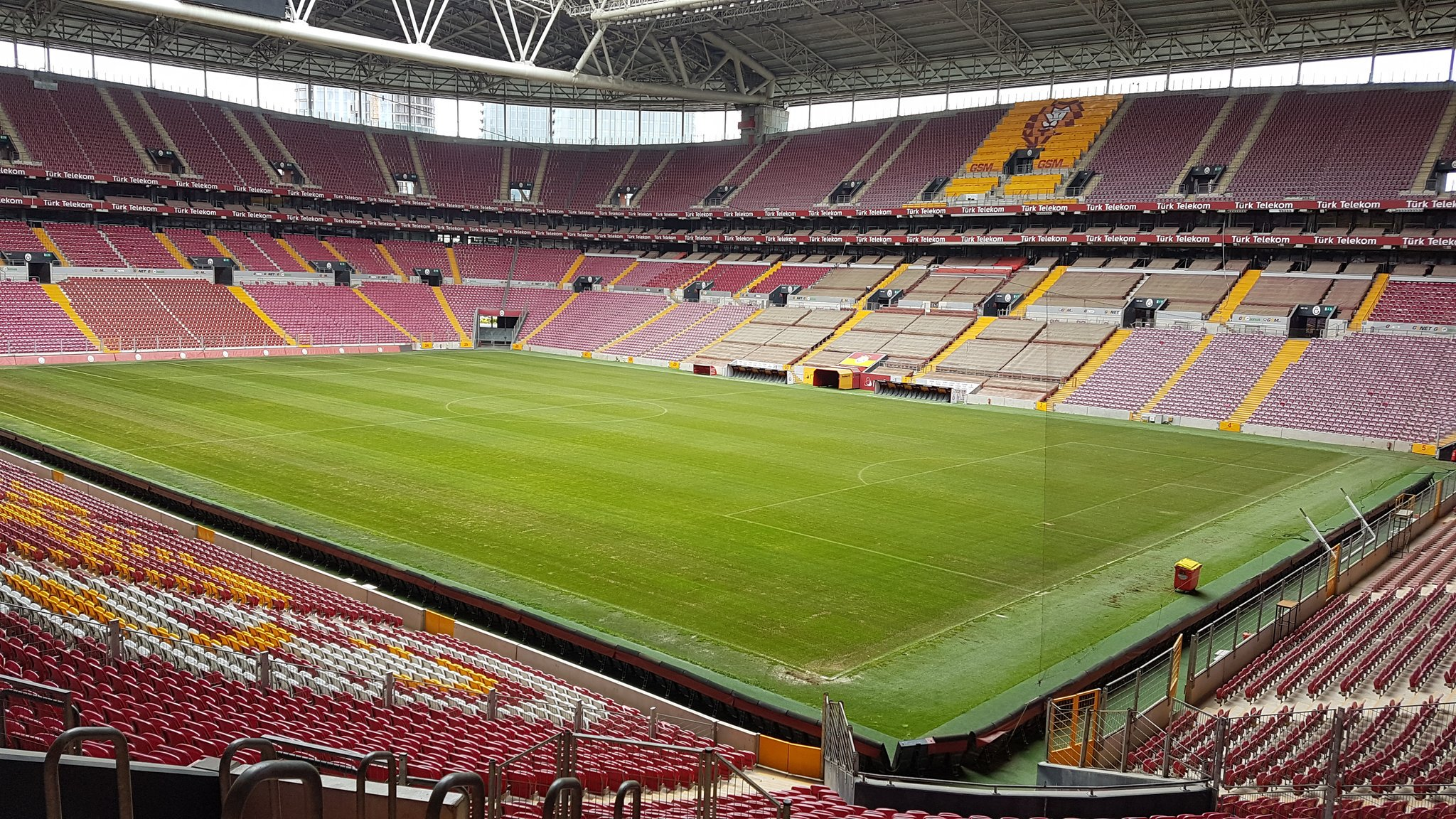
View of the stadium from the northeast stand corner, June 2017

In recent years, numerous proposals had been put forward to demolish the current stadium and build a new, larger one on the same location, but this was impossible due to the lack of space. Finally, the club's stadium, Ali Sami Yen Stadium, was now going to be replaced with a new stadium near Maslak financial district. The former name of the district, Seyrantepe, was changed to Aslantepe (Lion Hill) after Galatasaray purchased the land; Aslan ("Lion") being Galatasaray's symbol. The idea was to realize a stadium on the model of Arena AufSchalke in Gelsenkirchen, Germany. The stadium will feature a retractable roof—the first of its kind in Turkey.

=== Auction process ===
Galatasaray has been in cooperation with TOKİ (one of the biggest construction organizations of Turkey, budgeted by the Turkish government).

Among the four companies that tendered proposals, the best offer was put forward by the Eren Talu Architecture – ALKE Partnership. The contract for the tender held for the construction of Galatasaray's new stadium was signed between TOKİ and Eren Talu-ALKE consortium on 23 October 2007. The contract of the tender was realized by TOKİ and came to be known as the "Aslantepe Tender", covering the construction of a multipurpose sports complex with 52,652 spectator capacity on Aslantepe (formerly known as Seyrantepe) premises in return for building "Urban Social Infrastructure Areas" on 34.640 sq meters of land on which the present Ali Sami Yen Stadium is located.

There is a set period of 720 days for the construction of the stadium that will be built on the Aslantepe (formerly known as Seyrantepe) premises. The box count is 198 Part of the catering areas Turk Telekom Stadium consists of, is a VIP lounge room, VIP Market Area, Premium Food Court, Galatasaray Museum, Galatasaray Mega Store, 11 Galatasaray Store and a VIP restaurant. The modern stadium, contains five top and four underground levels.

=== Partnership ===
Once the Eren Talu-ALKE consortium had won the tender for the stadium project, they proceeded to find a foreign technical partner with previous experience in sports-construction related projects. They were introduced to the Abu Dhabi Group and Al Zarooni Group, both headquartered in the UAE. Abu Dhabi Group (also known as Dhabi Group), the largest foreign investor group in Pakistan, and the Al Zarooni Group are investors in the gigantic 5.5 million sq.m. Dubai Sports City project that is currently under construction in Dubai. The Chairman of Abu Dhabi Group is His Highness Sheikh Nahayan Mabarak Al Nahayan, who is also the Federal Minister for Higher Education & Scientific Research of the UAE and a very important member of Abu Dhabi's Ruling Family. The Dhabi-Zarooni consortium acquired 51% of the Eren Talu-ALKE consortium's shares to co-invest a total of $650 million with them in the Aslantepe (New Stadium) and Mecidiyeköy (Old Stadium) projects.

Stating that a total amount of $650 million will be invested for the entire project, Eren Talu said, "$170 million of this amount will be spent for the stadium, in addition to $180 million which is the guaranteed TOKİ share, a $50 million additional TOKİ share and the remaining $250 million+ to be invested in the mixed-use development project intended in Mecidiyeköy". Talu added that TOKİ's participation in the project provides great advantage for the partnership and continued, "our partners had confidence in the public benefit of the project and decided to join within a short period of just 2 months". Talu said they have already spent $37 million so far in order to construct up to the current level of the stadium. Stating that the stadium is to be delivered on time on 29 October 2010, Talu said, "We are casting 1,500 cubic meters of concrete every day. We have driven 4,500 meters of piles into the ground. A labour force of above 350 workers is busy at the construction site 24 hours a day. The stadium is going to be so strong that it may even be used as a catastrophe relief center if required."

Talu said the project being contemplated on the land in Mecidiyeköy in lieu of the old Ali Sami Yen Stadium will be initiated in June 2009, and added, "the mixed-use development project that we are going to build on land measuring 34,600 square meters will include apartments, a large shopping center, offices and a five-star hotel. A total of $650 million will be invested in these two projects, and in return, we expect an income of about $1.3 billion when the Mecidiyeköy mixed-use complex is completed. Therefore, this is a highly profitable venture."

The total stadium construction is expected to cost around US$191 million, not including the US$145+ million which will be spent on upgrading the nearby infrastructure.

The construction of the stadium stopped twice a time. When Talu had financial problems once again, TOKİ cancelled the process in July 2009. After termination of TOKİ-Talu agreement, TOKİ announced a new auction. Varyap-Uzunlar consortium won the auction and construction restarted in September 2009. Galatasaray and TOKİ had an agreement that the stadium would be opened without retractable roofs which will be installed at the end of the season.

=== Groundbreaking ceremony ===
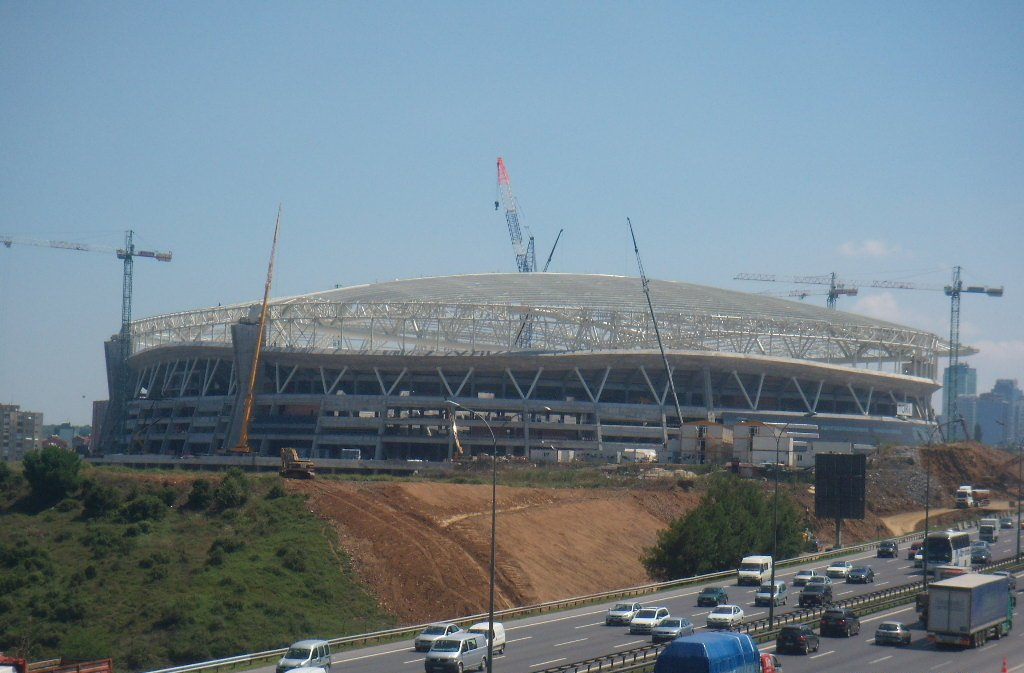
A view of the stadium during its construction

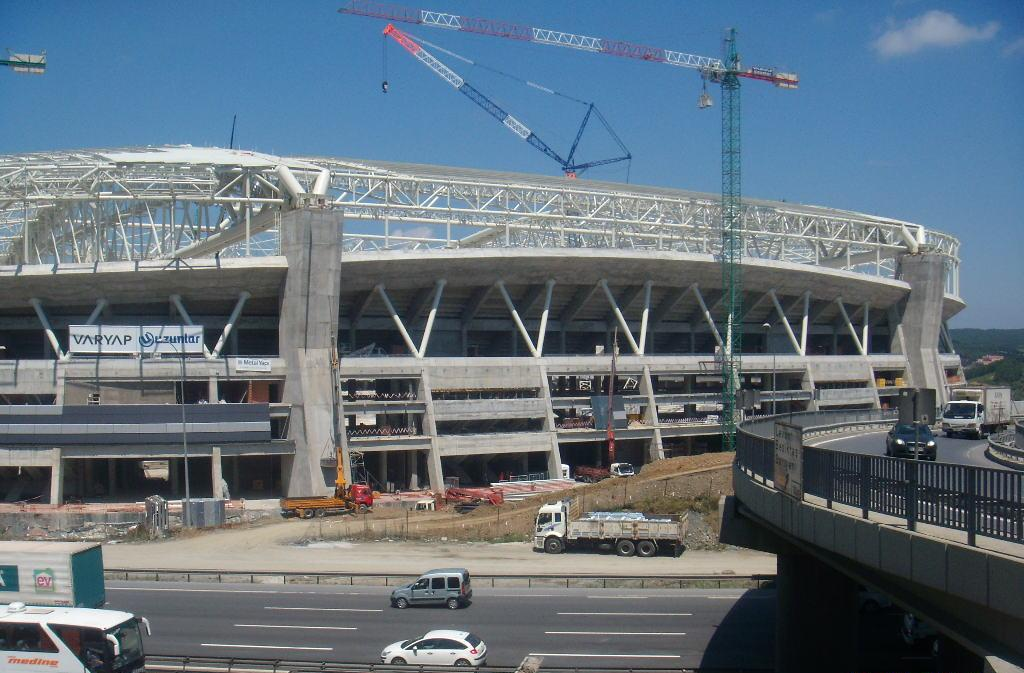
Construction in July 2010

As of 13 December 2007, the construction has officially started after a glitzy reception where the club's board, some players, the minister of sports for Turkey and many other ministers attended. In the ceremony, then President Özhan Canaydın stated, in summary: "The Turkish World of Sports will gain another big facility with the Ali Sami Yen Sports Complex and we've gathered here to celebrate its groundbreaking ceremony. This work, which will be a value add to Istanbul and Turkey along with Turkish Sports, will also serve as an honorable monument that will signify the advanced position Turkish Sports has achieved and the phases it has passed through."

=== Name ===
==== Türk Telekom Sponsorship ====
Special logo prepared for Türk Telekom Stadium

The naming rights were sold to Türk Telekom for a period of 10 years for US$10.25 million a year. The stadium has officially replaced the Ali Sami Yen Stadium at the middle of the 2010–2011 Süper Lig season, under the name of Türk Telekom Arena. North tribune's name of this stadium were sold to Pegasus Airlines for €4 million a year. The contract ended in October 2013. The naming rights of the first tier of the east tribune of Türk Telekom Stadium were also sold to Ülker for $2 million a year and will be named as Ülker Family Tribune. All 198 suites' and 4,844 VIP seats' naming rights were sold to Denizbank for three years.

On 18 December 2012 Galatasaray S.K. and Opel signed a 2.5-year contract for the naming rights of the Southstand. The club will receive €1.5 million per year (€3.75 million in total). On 24 September 2013 Galatasaray S.K. and Odeabank signed a five-year contract (€590,000 a year) for naming rights to the Northstand.

==== NEF Sponsorship ====
In the statement made by Galatasaray Sports Club on 11 October 2021, it was announced that a stadium name sponsorship agreement would be made with the real estate developer NEF Gayrimenkul.

In the new notification made on 12 October 2021, a sponsorship and advertising promotion agreement regarding stadium naming rights worth 725,000,000 Turkish Liras + VAT for a total of 10 (5+5) seasons, including 5 seasons, was signed between Galatasaray Sports Club and Timur Şehircilik Planning A.Ş. explanation has been made.

At the press conference held at the Ali Sami Yen Sports Complex on 12 October 2021, Galatasaray and Nef signed the largest stadium naming sponsorship agreement in Turkish sports history. The press launch of the agreement, which took place at the newly named Ali Sami Yen Sports Complex Nef Stadium, was held with the participation of Burak Elmas, President of Galatasaray Sports Club, and Erden Timur, Chairman of Nef Board of Directors.

==== Rams Global sponsorship ====
On 21 July 2023, Rams Global became the stadium title sponsor of Ali Sami Yen Sports Complex under the name Rams Park.

==== Individual stand sponsorships ====
Stand	Sponsor	Duration	€ M/year	Total € M
Stadium	Türk Telekom	10 years (2011–2021)	7.5	75
Stadium	Nef	2 years (2021–2023)	7.9	15.8
Stadium	Rams Global	5 years (2023–2028)	8.7	43,5
North	Pegasus Airlines	2 years (2011–2013)	4	8
North	Odeabank	5 years (2013–2018)	0.59	2.95
South	Opel	2.5 years (2012–2015)	1.5	3.75
South	MNG Kargo	2 years (2015–2017)	?	?
1st tier East	Ülker	2 years (2011–2013)	2	4

== Facts ==
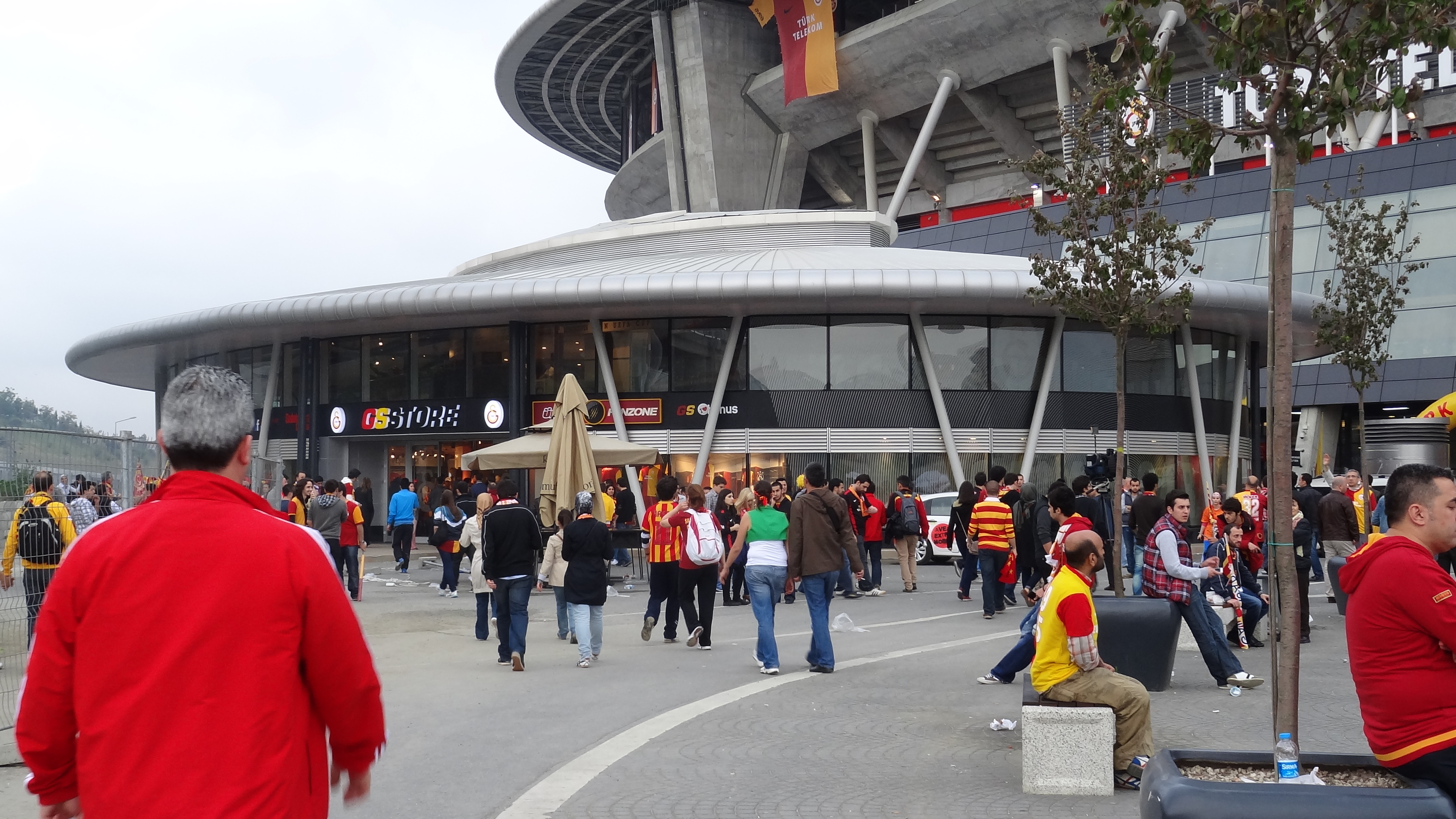
Ali Sami Yen Spor Kompleksi Galatasaray Store

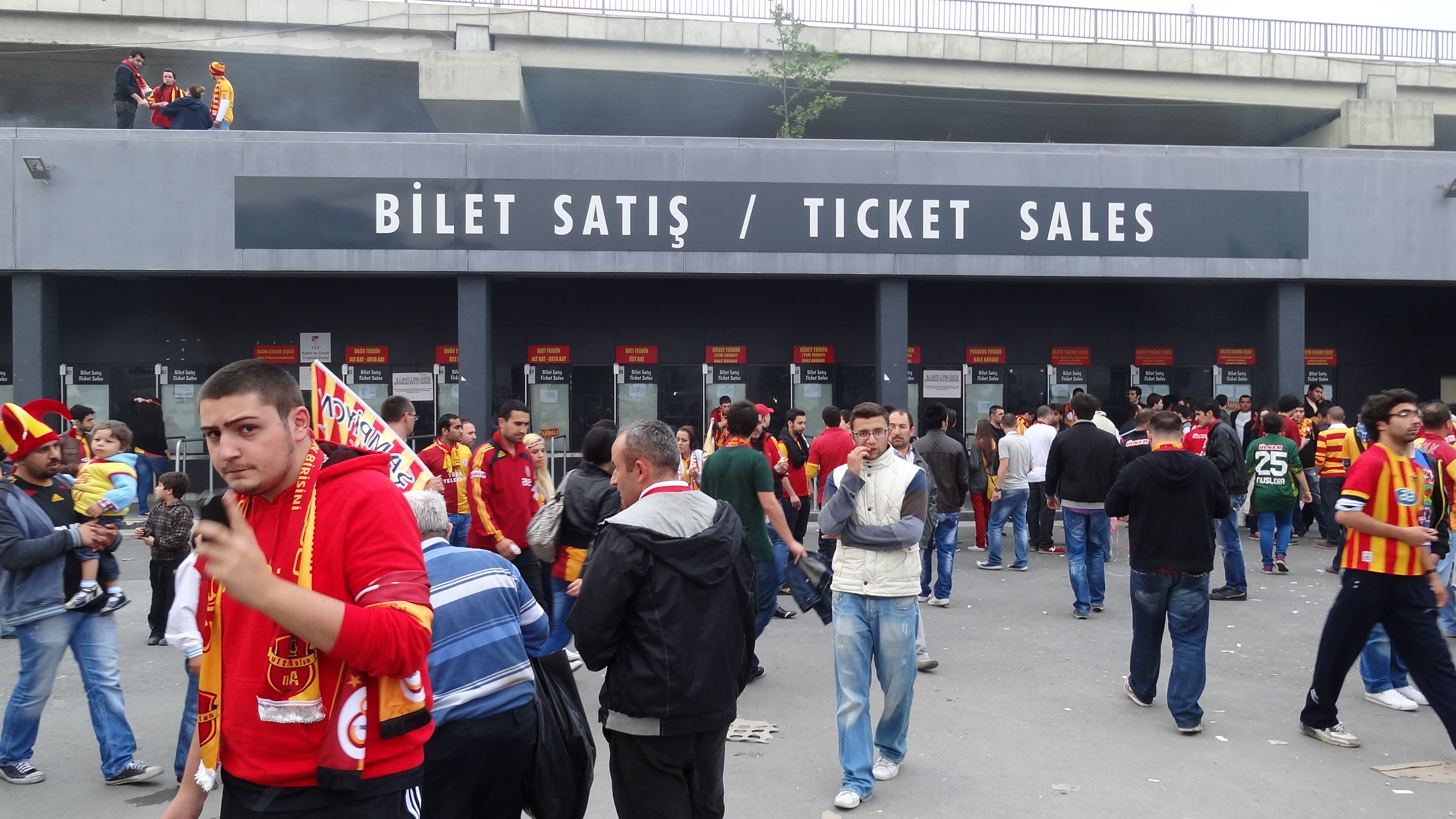
Ticket sales

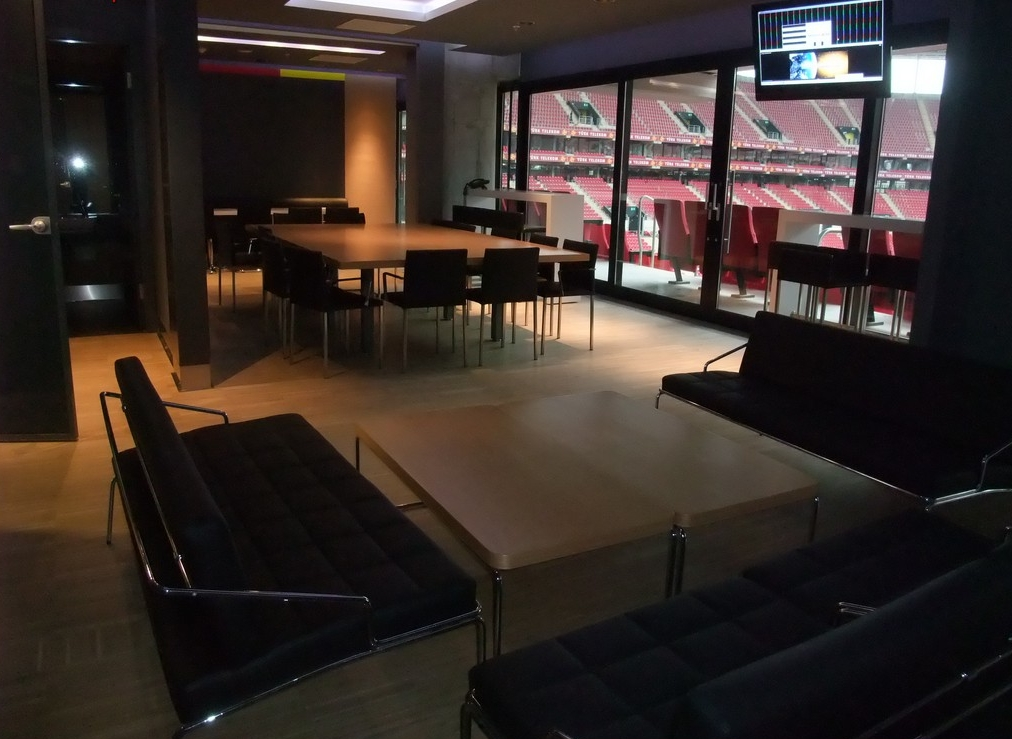
One of the 221 suites

=== Dimensions ===
- Stadium: 195,000 m^{2} – 228m x 190m x 70m
- Playing level: 120 m x 83 m
- Gross grass area: 111 m x 72 m
- Playing field: 105 m x 68 m

=== Capacity ===
- West Stand: 10,713
  - 1st tier: 5,525
  - 1st suit level: 399
  - 2nd suit level: 266
  - 2nd tier: 4,523
- East Stand: 11,425
  - 1st tier: 5,751
  - 1st suit level: 399
  - 2nd suit level: 266
  - 2nd tier: 5,009
- South Stand: 15,246
  - 1st tier: 8,209
  - 1st suit level: (no suites existing)
  - 2nd suit level: 484
  - 2nd tier: 6,553
- North Stand: 15,268
  - 1st tier: 8,028
  - 1st suit level: (no suites existing)
  - 2nd suit level: 622
  - 2nd tier: 6,618

=== Stands ===
- 1st Tier: 19.93° – 29.54° (average 23.96°)
- 2nd Tier: 34.61° – 35.474° (average 35.10°)
- Distance West/East stand to the pitch: 6.2 m
- Distance North/South stand to the pitch: 8.2 m
- First row is 6 cm above pitch level
- Highest row at West/East stand: 36.07 m
- Highest row at north–south: 34.93 m
- 1st tier: 37 rows
- Suit balcony: 3 rows
- 2nd tier: 20–27 rows

=== Suites ===
- South stand: 65 suites
- West stand: 60 suites
- East stand: 52 suites
- North stand: 44 suites
- Total: 221 suites
- 6,321 seats
- capacity: 6 – 27 persons

=== Construction ===
- Total concrete used during stadium construction: 190,000 m^{3}
- Total steel used during stadium construction: 35,000 tonnes
- Total steel used for the roof: 5,500 tonnes

=== Additions ===
==== 2012 ====
In time for the 2012–13 season, the club added 41 new suites at the North Corners of Level 4. So the total amount raised from 157 to 198, making it second in Europe behind Estadio Santiago Bernabéu which has got 245 suites. The capacity decreased from 52,652 to 52,223.

==== 2018 - Hybrid grass ====
In January 2018, a SISGrass hybrid pitch was relaid to improve the pitch quality.

==== 2022 - Solar panels ====
Under the agreement signed between Galatasaray and Enerjisa on March 9, 2021, plans were set in motion to equip the Stadium's roof with solar energy panels. The objective is to empower the stadium to generate its own energy, with Enerjisa securing the operating rights for the system over a 10-year span.

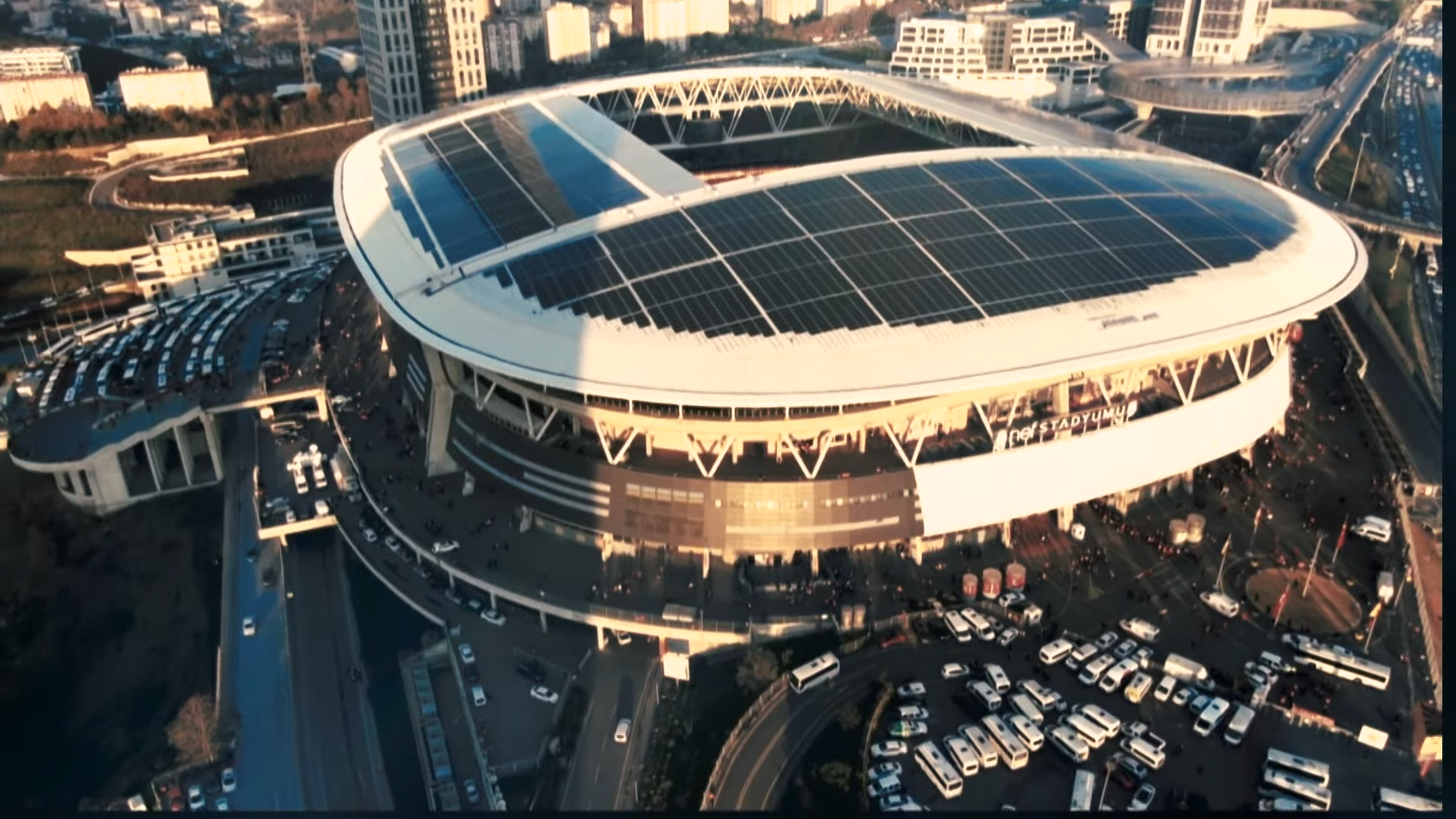
10,404 Solar panels on the roof

The ambitious project unfolded as 10,404 solar panels were installed on the stadium's roof, spanning an impressive area of 16,700 square meters. This significant undertaking is projected to cover 63% of the stadium's energy consumption. Notably, the solar installation boasts a capacity to produce 4.3 MW of power.

This innovative initiative propelled Rams Park to claim the prestigious title of "Most Powerful Stadium Operated by Solar Energy," earning a well-deserved place in the Guinness World Records.

==== 2023 - 23 new suites and minor capacity increase ====
In the summer of 2023, the GSYIAD (Galatasaray Administrators and Business People Association) lounge underwent a notable transformation, being reconfigured into 12 distinctive suites. This enhancement contributed to the addition of 12 more suites, bringing the total number to 210.

After the completion of a new structure to house the Galatasaray TV studio above the press stand, a strategic reconfiguration took place. The former studio area on the 2nd suite level was repurposed, resulting in the creation of 11 additional suites. This increased the total number of loge spaces to 221.

A new row of seats has been added to the rearmost row of the 2nd tier of the East and West stands, increasing the capacity from 52,280 to 53,387

==== 2025 - LED Screen, Lighting and Media Facilities Upgrade ====
Between May and August 2025, Galatasaray carried out a multi-million modernization project at Rams Park aimed at improving the matchday atmosphere and commercial opportunities. The works included enlarging the main video screens, upgrading the stadium’s interior and exterior lighting systems, and installing high-resolution LED advertising boards in both the box (loge) level and the second tier. Additional LED panels were mounted between the stands to expand advertising space and enhance the visual experience inside the stadium.

In addition to the previously installed new lighting systems and LED advertising panels, Galatasaray completed a major display upgrade in late 2025 by replacing the stadium’s south-stand scoreboard with a new 240 m² LED screen, making it approximately three times larger than the old model. The new screen provides significantly improved visibility, higher resolution, and expanded commercial display capabilities. In January 2026, a second video screen was completed; it is identical in size to the existing screen.

Galatasaray also modernised the press tribune, installing new work desks, electrical infrastructure, monitors, and upgraded seating. Club officials stated that the renovated area now meets — and in some aspects exceeds — European standards for media facilities. They also noted that this renovation represents the first stage of a broader long-term plan to modernise further interior areas of the stadium.

== Concerts ==
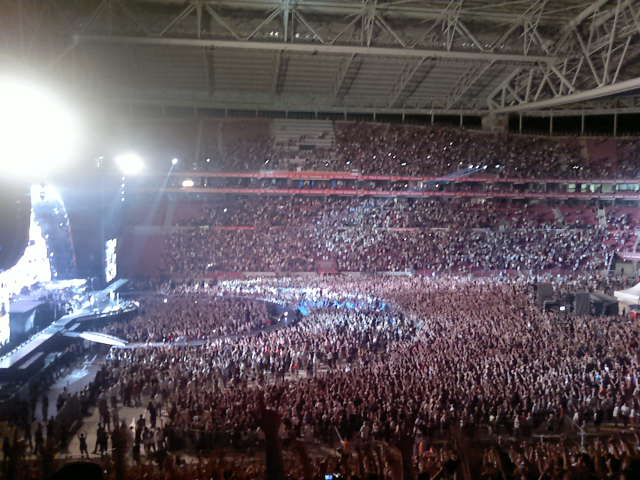
Bon Jovi concert on 8 July 2011

The stadium can also be turned into a concert arena with a capacity for over 70,000 people. The first band to play at Rams Park was Bon Jovi on 8 July 2011. The second singer at the stadium was Madonna, who performed on 7 June 2012 as part of her MDNA Tour. She played in front of 47,789 fans.

== Surroundings ==
=== Aslanlı Yol ===
From the Seyrantepe Metro Station just east of the stadium, visitors approach the stadium through a road called Aslanlı Yol, which was designed to disentangle and guide them to the entrance. It is 200 meters long and 45 meters wide. Ticket sales, Simit Sarayı Restaurant and Yüzevler Restaurant are also located at the Aslanlı Yol.

=== Aslantepe GSStore ===
On 7 February 2012 a new GS Store opened next to the stadium. It has got a similar architecture and was designed by Galatasaray S.K. project coordinator Coşkun Peküstün and the architect Ayşegül Uslu. it is built on a 950 m^{2} area and the floor area is 1,650 m^{2}. It has two floors; the first floor is used for the retail and the second holds the Ülker Fan Zone.

== Transportation ==
=== Public transport ===
Rams Park is served by a number of bus routes and the shuttle line of Metro M2, which runs from the Sanayi Mahallesi Station to Seyrantepe at the stadium.

Service/Operator	Station/Wharf	Line
Train	Seyrantepe Metro station	Yenikapı ↔ Hacıosman
Funicular	Seyrantepe Metro station	Vadistanbul ↔ Seyrantepe

=== Car ===
The stadium is located next to the Otoyol 2 motorway. There are four four-story parking garages with 3,225 (3,025 covered and 200 open) parking places. In addition, there are also 28 places available for buses at the west entrance.

== Payment methods ==
=== GS Bonus Card ===
The GS Bonus Card is the stadium card of Galatasaray S.K. which can also be used as a credit card. Unified RFID cards are used as season tickets at Rams Park. The card can be used for all services at the stadium.

=== fastPay ===
On March 12, 2019, Galatasaray and DenizBank started an important cooperation which will lay the foundation of the cash-free payment period at Ali Sami Yen Sports Complex Rams Park for the first time in Turkey. Accordingly, the fans will be able to make payment through fastPay, the first digital wallet of Turkey, while shopping at the stadium, the stores and the snack bars around the stadium and at the GS Store, easily and safely without having to pay any cash.

== Records ==
=== List ===
Rank	Attendance	Date	Organization	Game
1	53,755	19 May 2024	Süper Lig	Galatasaray – Fenerbahçe
2	53,513	26 April 2026	Süper Lig	Galatasaray – Fenerbahçe
3	52,795	24 February 2025	Süper Lig	Galatasaray – Fenerbahçe
4	52,633	26 October 2026	Süper Lig	Galatasaray – Fenerbahçe
5	52,607	12 April 2026	Süper Lig	Galatasaray – Kocaeli
6	52,240	07 November 2026	Süper Lig	Galatasaray – Amed SFK
7	51,792	24 October 2023	UEFA Champions League	Galatasaray – Bayern Münich
8	51,750	28 October 2024	Süper Lig	Galatasaray – Beşiktaş
9	51,741	29 November 2023	UEFA Champions League	Galatasaray – Manchester United
10	51,739	7 November 2024	UEFA Europa League	Galatasaray – Tottenham Hotspur

- The highest number of spectators at Rams Park was 53,775 people in the Süper Lig 37th week match played between Galatasaray and Fenerbahçe on May 19, 2024.
- The highest attendance for a UEFA Champions League match is 51,792, between Galatasaray and FC Bayern Münich on 24 October 2023.
- The highest attendance for a UEFA Europa League match was 51,739 on 7 November 2024 between Galatasaray and Tottenham Hotspur.
- The highest attendance for a non-competitive game is 40,000, set on 15 January 2011 for a pre-season testimonial between Galatasaray and Ajax.
- The highest attendance for a Turkish Cup match is 48,894, set on 22 April 2026, when Galatasaray played against Gençlerbirliği S.K..
- The highest attendance for a national team match is 49,532. Set on 7 October 2011, when Turkey played against Germany.
- The highest attendance for a concert is 47,789. Set on 7 June 2012, when Madonna performed a concert as part of her MDNA Tour.

=== Loudest crowd ===
On March 18, 2011, the Rams Park recorded 131.76 decibels which was considered to be the world record for "loudest crowd roar at a sport stadium" in Guinness World Records The record has since then been raised by NFL American football games starting with September 15, 2013 at CenturyLink Field in a Seattle Seahawks game that reached 136.6 decibels; on October 13, 2013, at Arrowhead Stadium in a Kansas City Chiefs game that reached 137.5 dB,; again at CenturyLink Field on December 2, 2013, with 137.6 decibels; and most recently reclaimed by Arrowhead Stadium on September 29, 2014, in a game that reached 142.2 dB.

== Matches ==
=== Turkey national team ===
Rams Park is one of the main home stadiums of the Turkey national team.

Date	Time (CEST)	Team #1	Result	Team #2	Round	Attendance
10 August 2011	20.30	Turkey	3–0	Estonia	Friendly	25,000
2 September 2011	19.00	Turkey	2–1	Kazakhstan	Euro 2012 qualifying	47,756
7 October 2011	20.30	Turkey	1–3	Germany	Euro 2012 qualifying	49,532
11 October 2011	19.00	Turkey	1–0	Azerbaijan	Euro 2012 qualifying	32,174
11 November 2011	20.05	Turkey	0–3	Croatia	Euro 2012 qualifying	42,863
14 November 2012	20.30	Turkey	1–1	Denmark	Friendly	30,000
17 November 2014	20.45	Turkey	3–1	Kazakhstan	Euro 2016 qualifying	27,549
14 November 2019	18.00	Turkey	0–0	Iceland	Euro 2020 qualifying	48,329
20 March 2025	18.00	Turkey	3–1	Hungary	2024–25 UEFA Nations League promotion/relegation play-offs	38,500

=== 2013 FIFA U-20 World Cup ===
The stadium was one of the venues for the 2013 FIFA U-20 World Cup. However, due to sponsorship contracts, the stadium was called Ali Sami Yen Arena during the World Cup.

The following games were played at the stadium during the World Cup of 2013:

Date	Time (CEST)	Team #1	Res.	Team #2	Round	Attendance
21 June 2013	18.00	France	3–1	Ghana	Group A	4,133
21 June 2013	21.00	(United States) USA	1–4	Spain	Group A	4,133
24 June 2013	18.00	France	1–1	(United States) USA	Group A	4,120
24 June 2013	21.00	Spain	1–0	Ghana	Group A	4,120
27 June 2013	20.00	Spain	2–1	France	Group A	7,511
27 June 2013	17.00	South Korea	0–1	Nigeria	Group B	7,511
2 July 2013	18.00	Spain	2–1	Mexico	Round of 16	7,211
2 July 2013	21.00	Nigeria	1–2	Uruguay	Round of 16	7,211
7 July 2013	21.00	Ghana	4–3	Chile	Quarterfinals	6,632
13 July 2013	18.00	Ghana	3–0	Iraq	Third place match	20,601
13 July 2013	21.00	France	0–0	Uruguay	Final	20,601

=== 2027 Supercopa de España ===
On 18 September 2026, the Royal Spanish Football Federation announced that the 43rd edition of the 2027 Supercopa de España final will be played in Rams Park.

== Season tickets and average attendance ==
Season	Sold season tickets	Average league attendance
2011 (just 2nd half)	20,000	29,887
2011–2012	27,900	34,685
2012–2013	47,200	43,262
2013–2014	46,250*	40,094
2014–2015	43,108	26,193
2015–2016	39,849	18,996
2016–2017	22,167	21,751
2017–2018	41,167	41,076
2018–2019	46,716	36,439
2019–2020	47,729	35,231
2020–2021	N/A due to COVID-19 pandemic	
2021–2022	N/A due to COVID-19 pandemic	21,425
2022–2023	40,105	45,516
2023–2024	42,000**	43,251
2024–2025	41,614	44,525
2025–2026	42,000	45,432
2026–2027	42,649	48,491 (after six matches)

*Stopped at 46,250. Demand was 65,000. **Stopped at 42,000. Demand was 67,000.

== Gallery ==
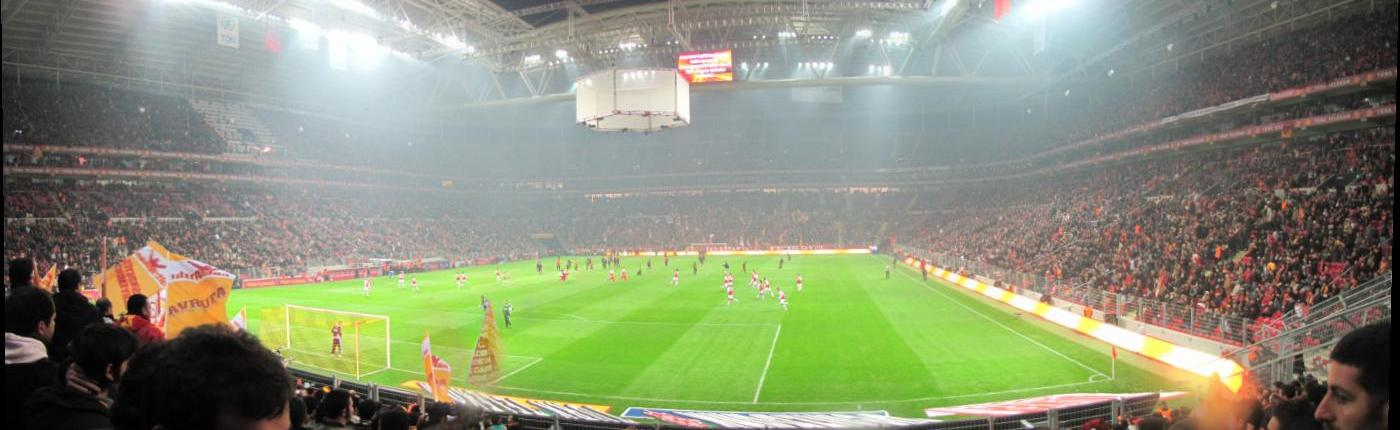
A panoramic view of the interior
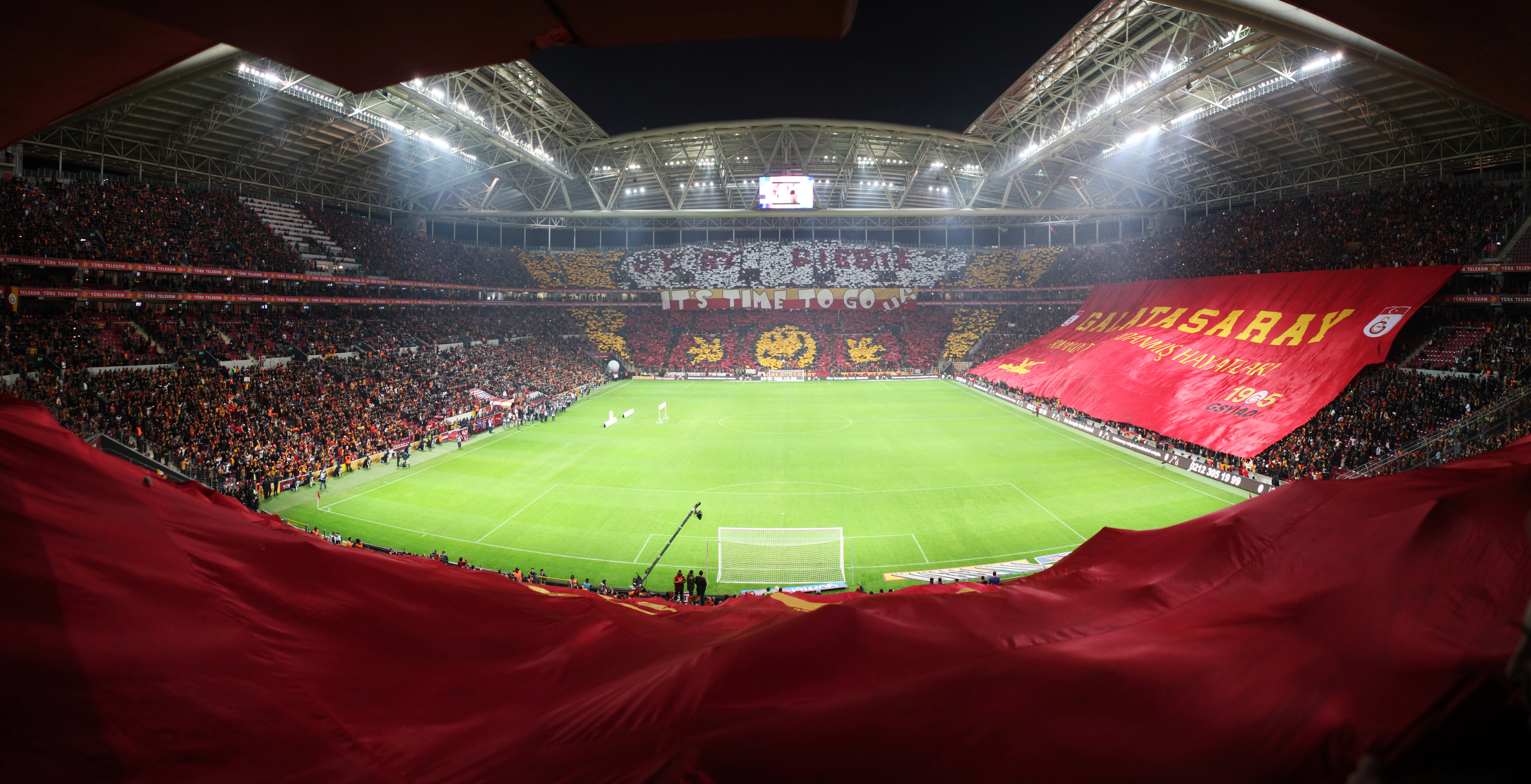
Galatasaray – Fenerbahçe 3–1, 7 December 2011
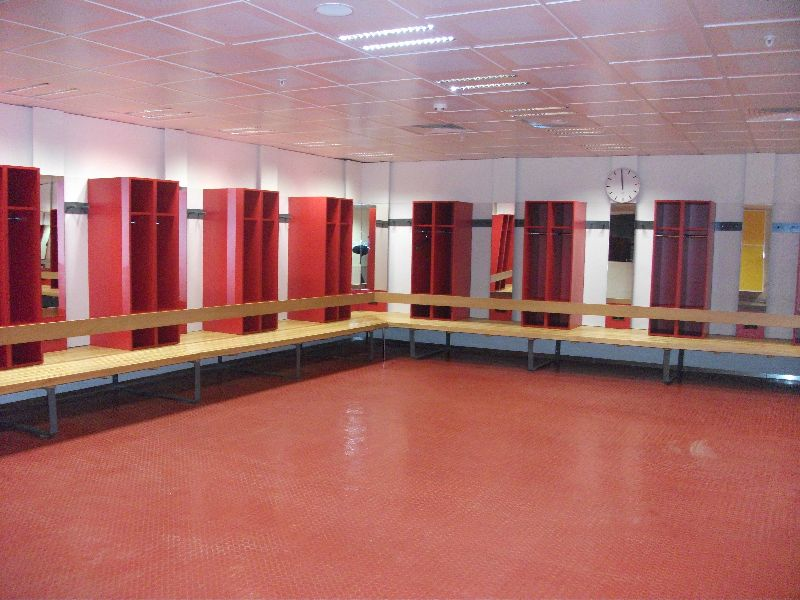
Dressing Room

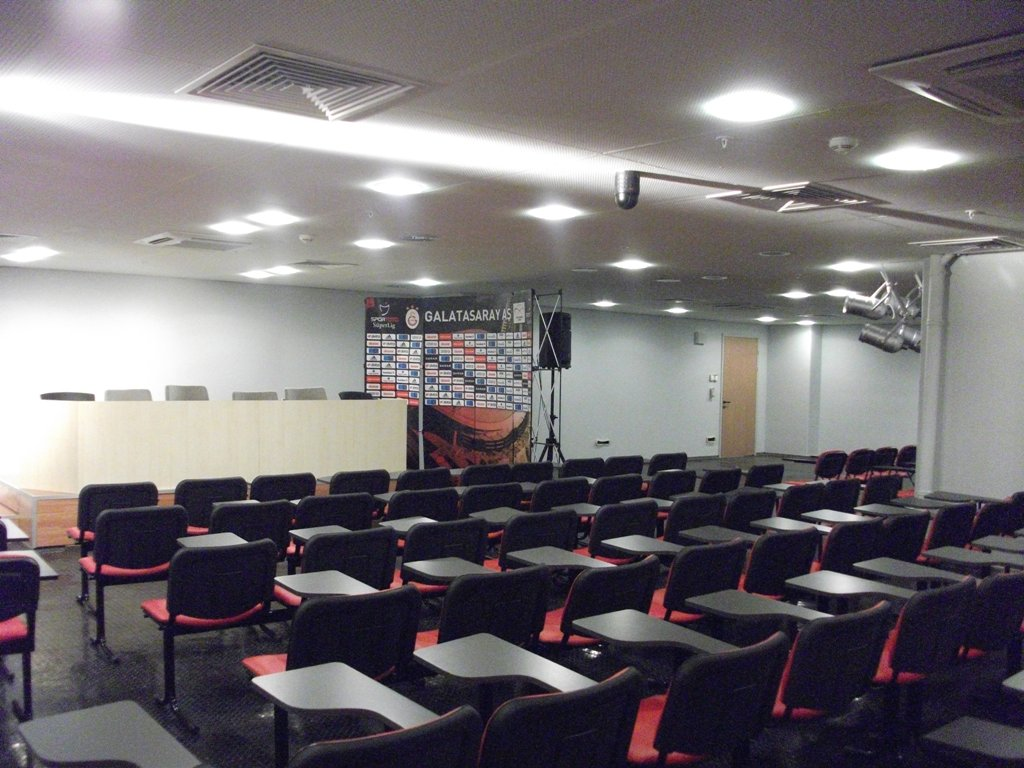
Press Room

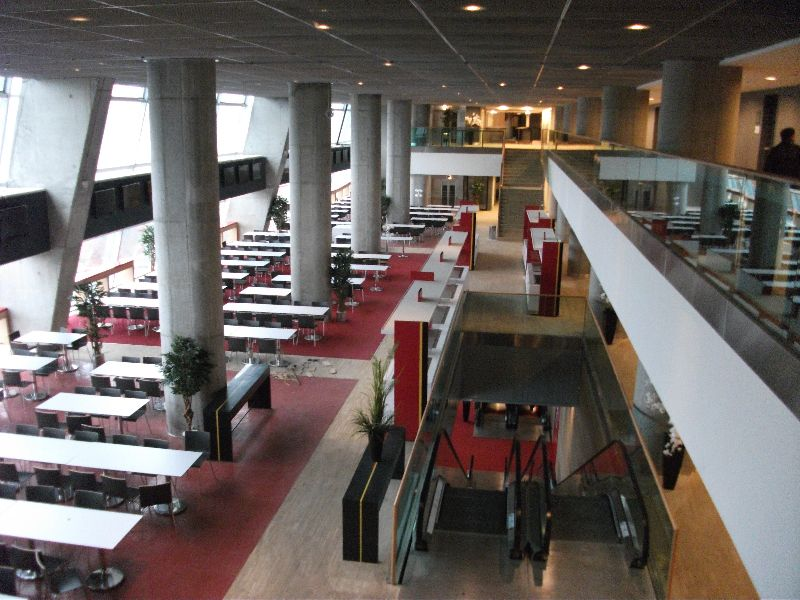
VIP Lounge

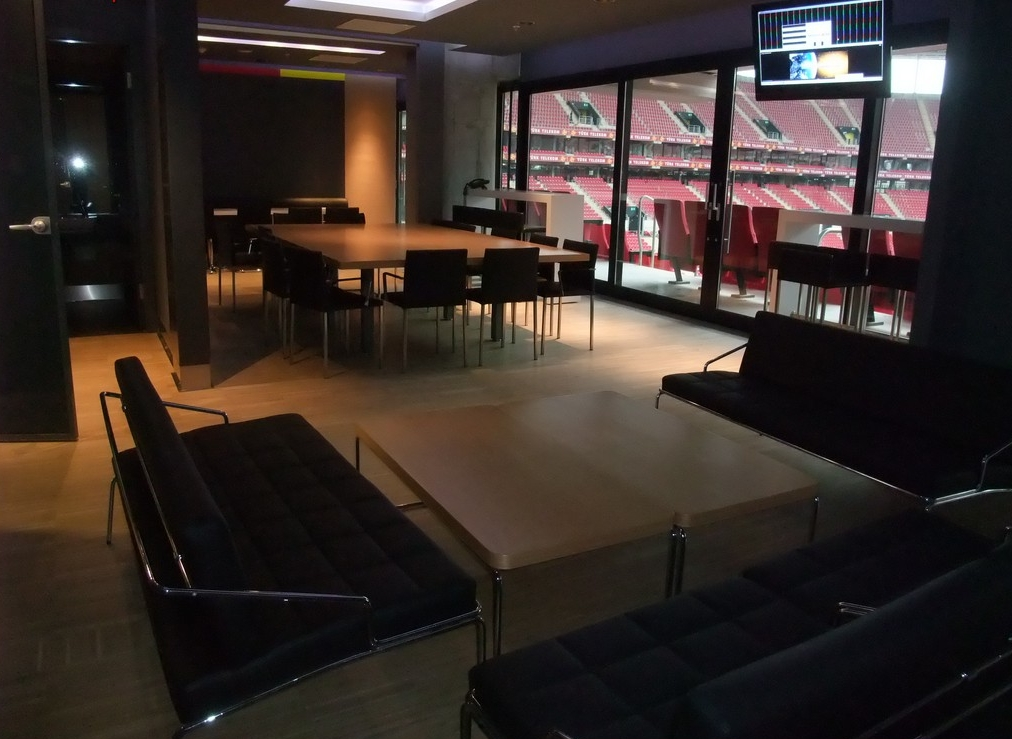
Suite

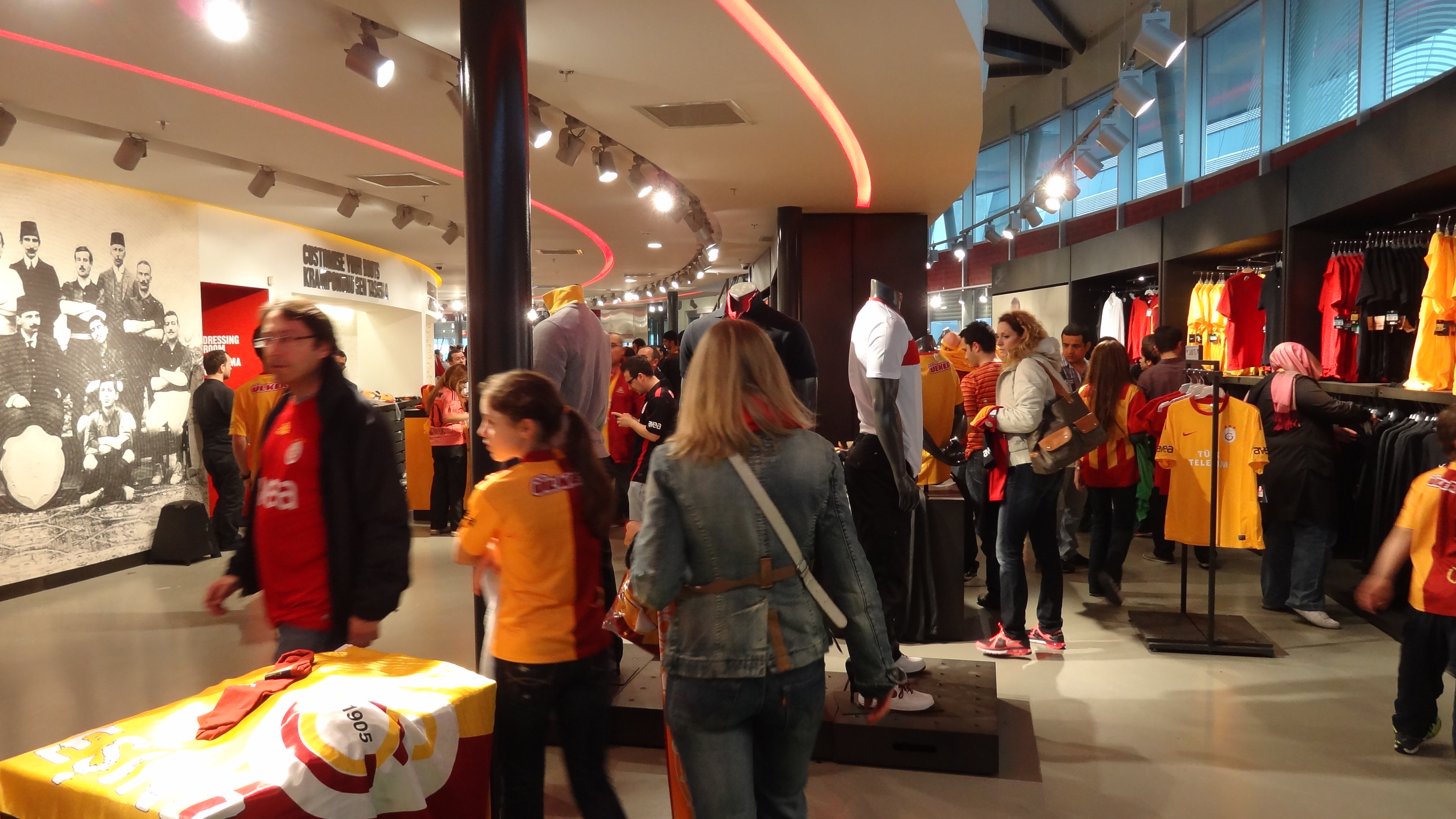
Galatasaray Store

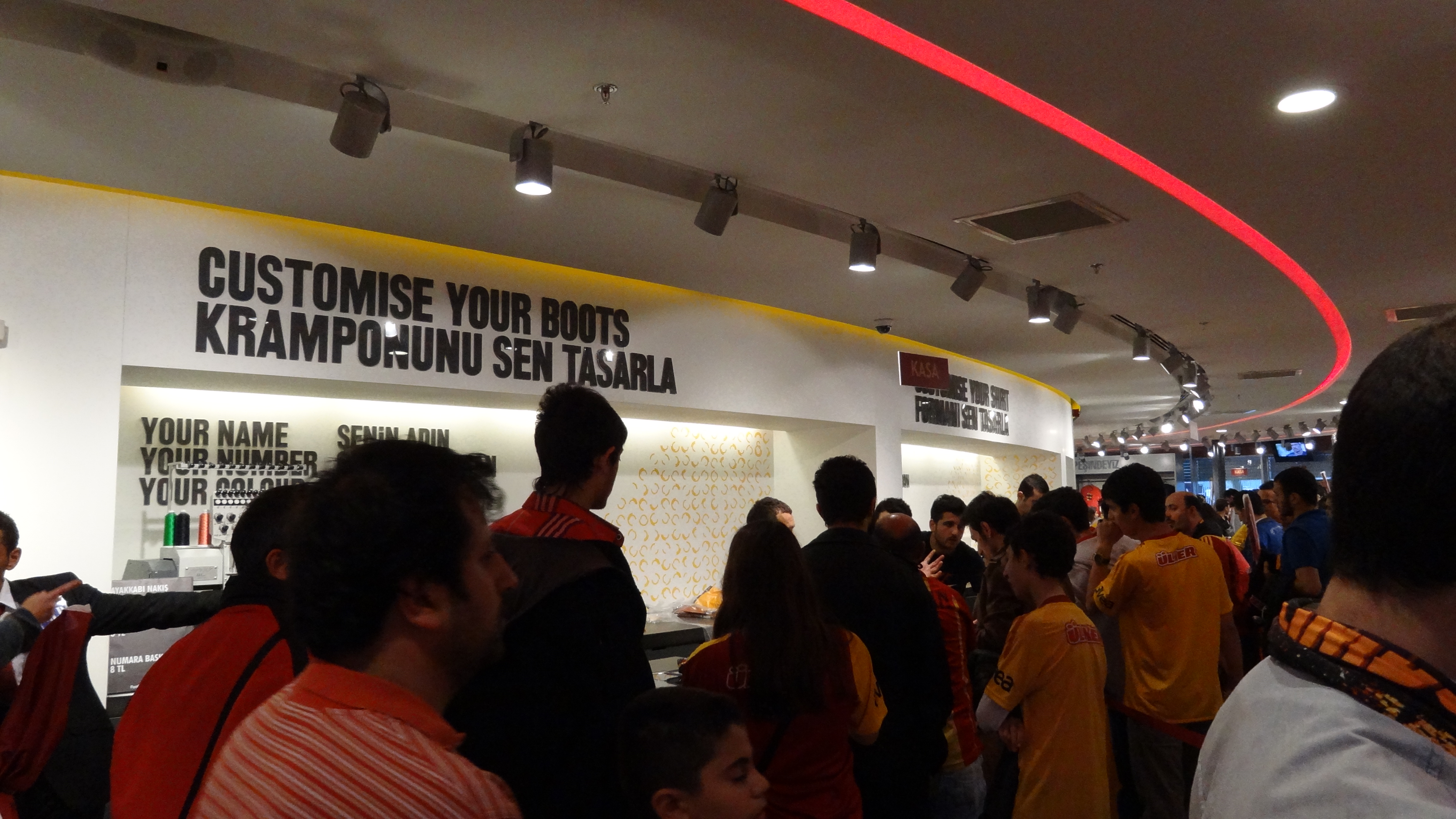
Galatasaray Store

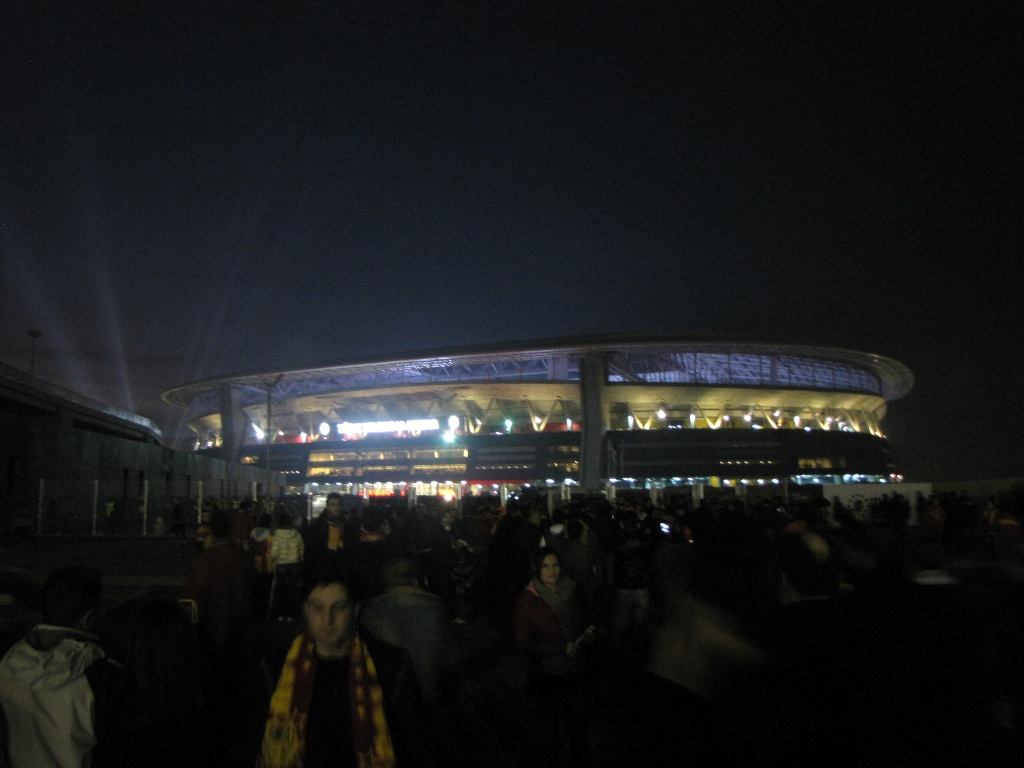
Aslanlı Yol

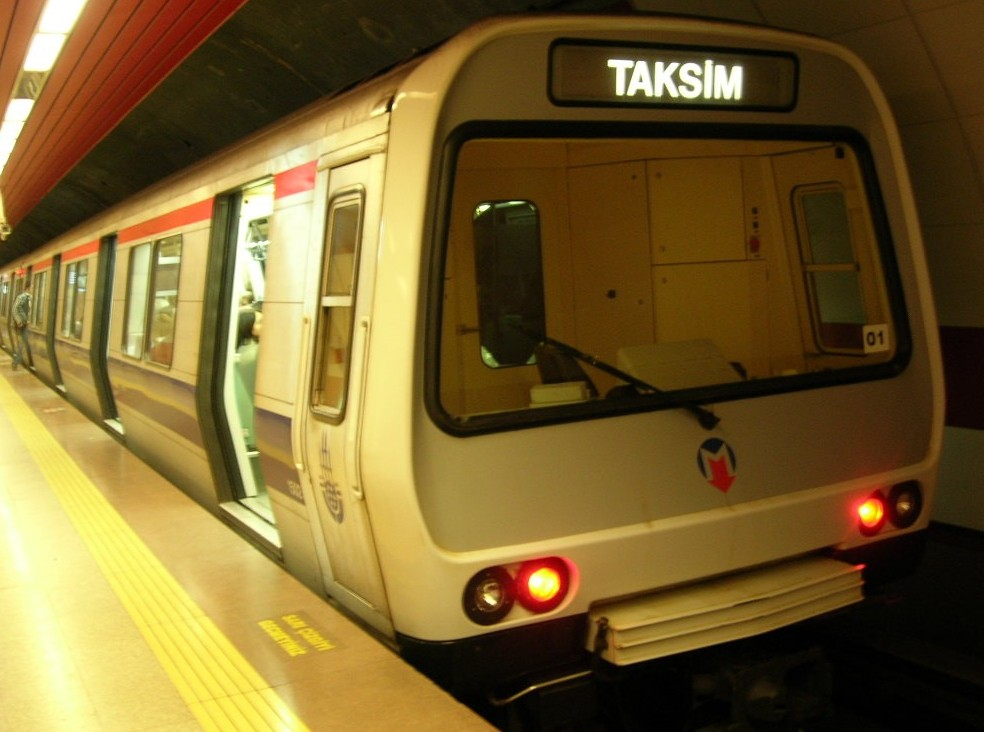
Seyrantepe Metro Station

== See also ==
- List of football stadiums in Turkey
- Istanbul bid for the 2020 Summer Olympics
- Lists of stadiums
- UEFA Euro 2032

Preceded by Estadio Nemesio Camacho; Bogotá	FIFA U-20 World Cup; Final Venue; 2013	Succeeded by North Harbour Stadium; Auckland
