= Ali Sami Yen Sports Complex =

Multi-purpose sports venue in Istanbul, Turkey

- Ali Sami Yen Spor Kompleksi
- Interactive map of Ali Sami Yen Sports Complex
- Full name: Ali Sami Yen Spor Kompleksi
- Location: Şişli, Istanbul, Turkey
- Coordinates: 41°6′10.33″N 28°59′25.51″E
- Owner: Galatasaray S.K.
- Operator: Galatasaray SK

Construction
- Groundbreaking: 13 December 2007
- Built: 2007–
- Opened: 15 January 2011; 15 years ago
- Architect: 'asp' architekten Stuttgart

Tenant
- Galatasaray S.K.

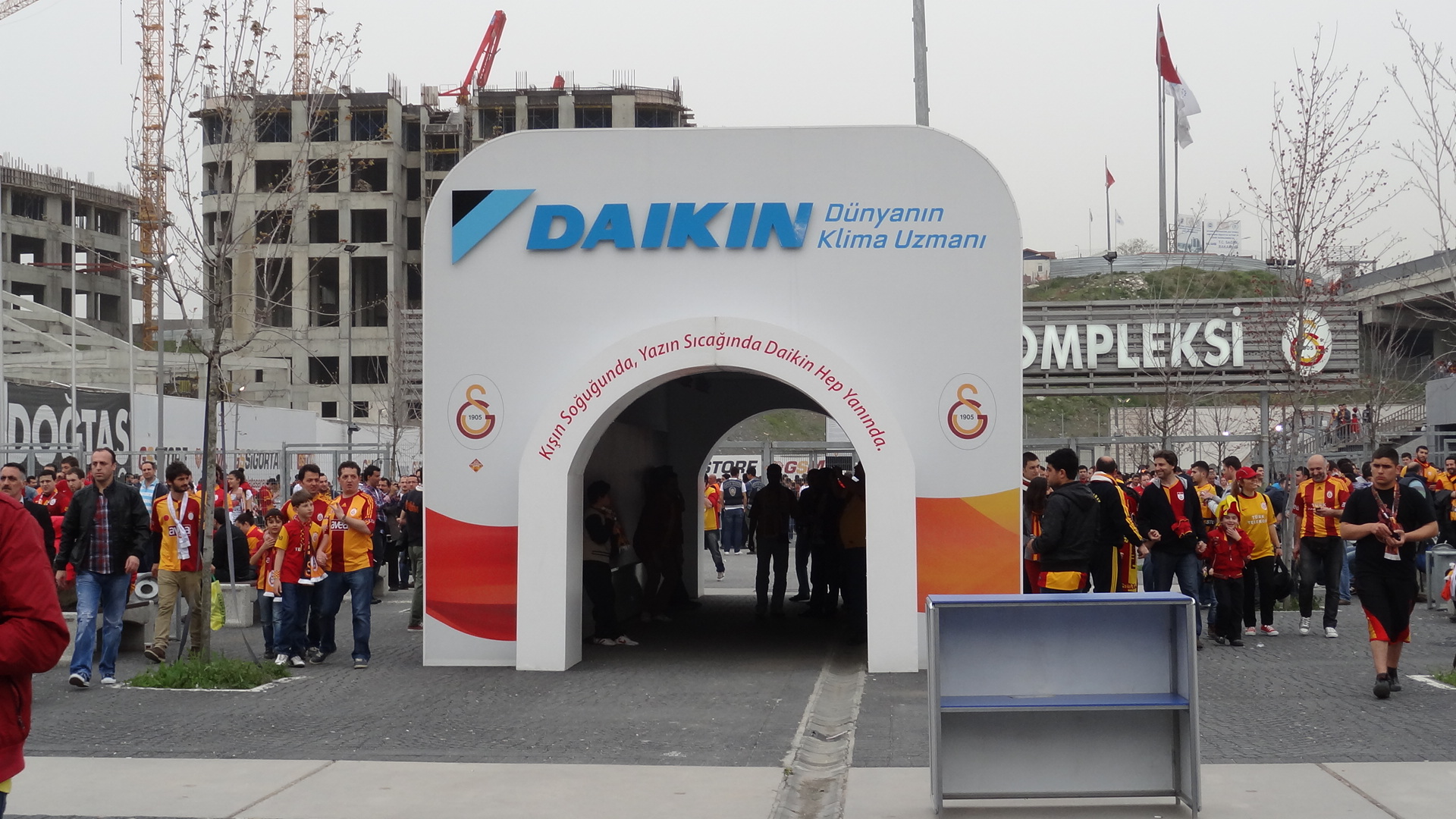
Daikin, Official Sponsor of Galatasaray SK, Ali Sami Yen Sports Complex

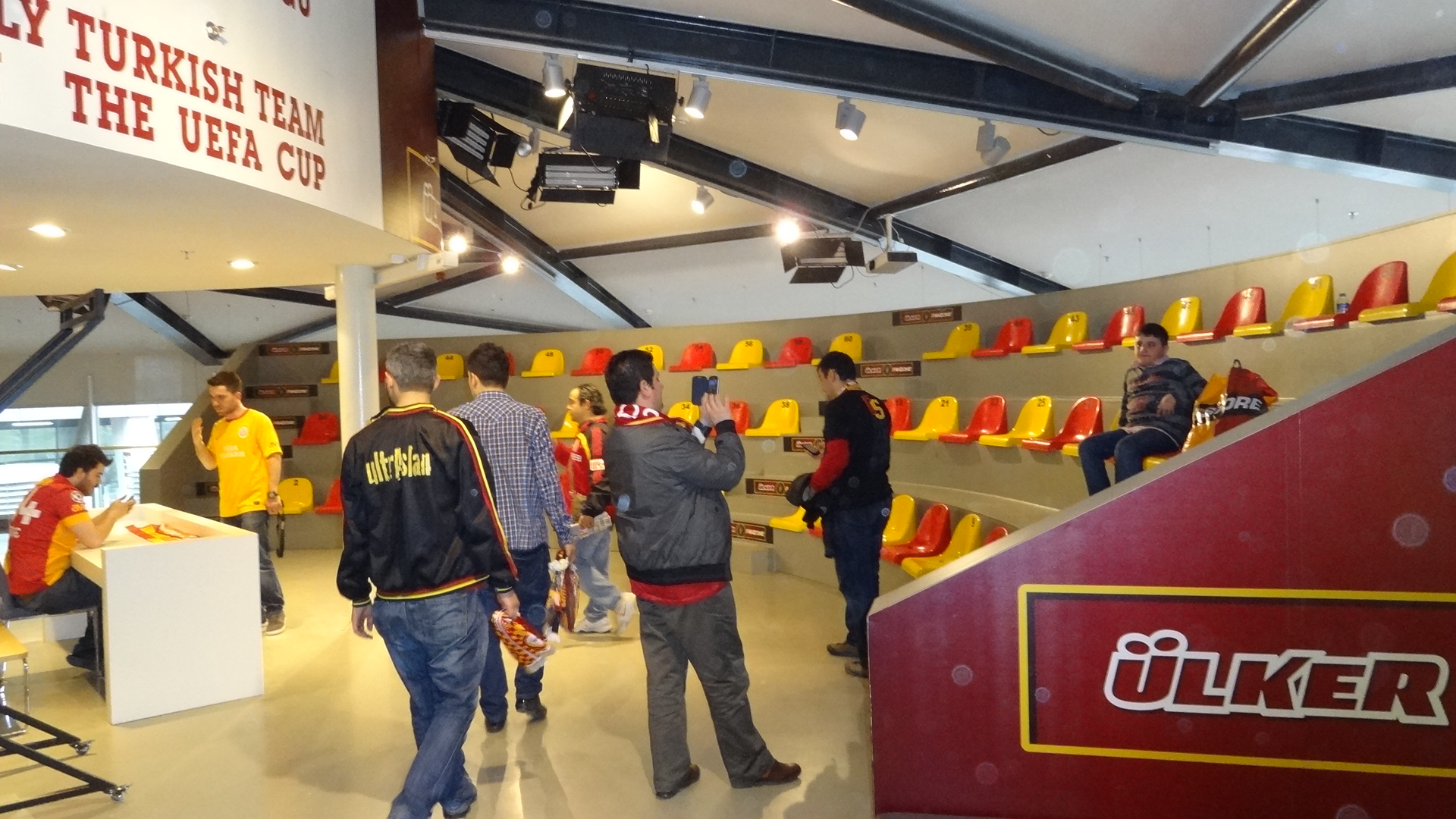
Ali Sami Yen Spor Kompleksi Galatasaray store interior

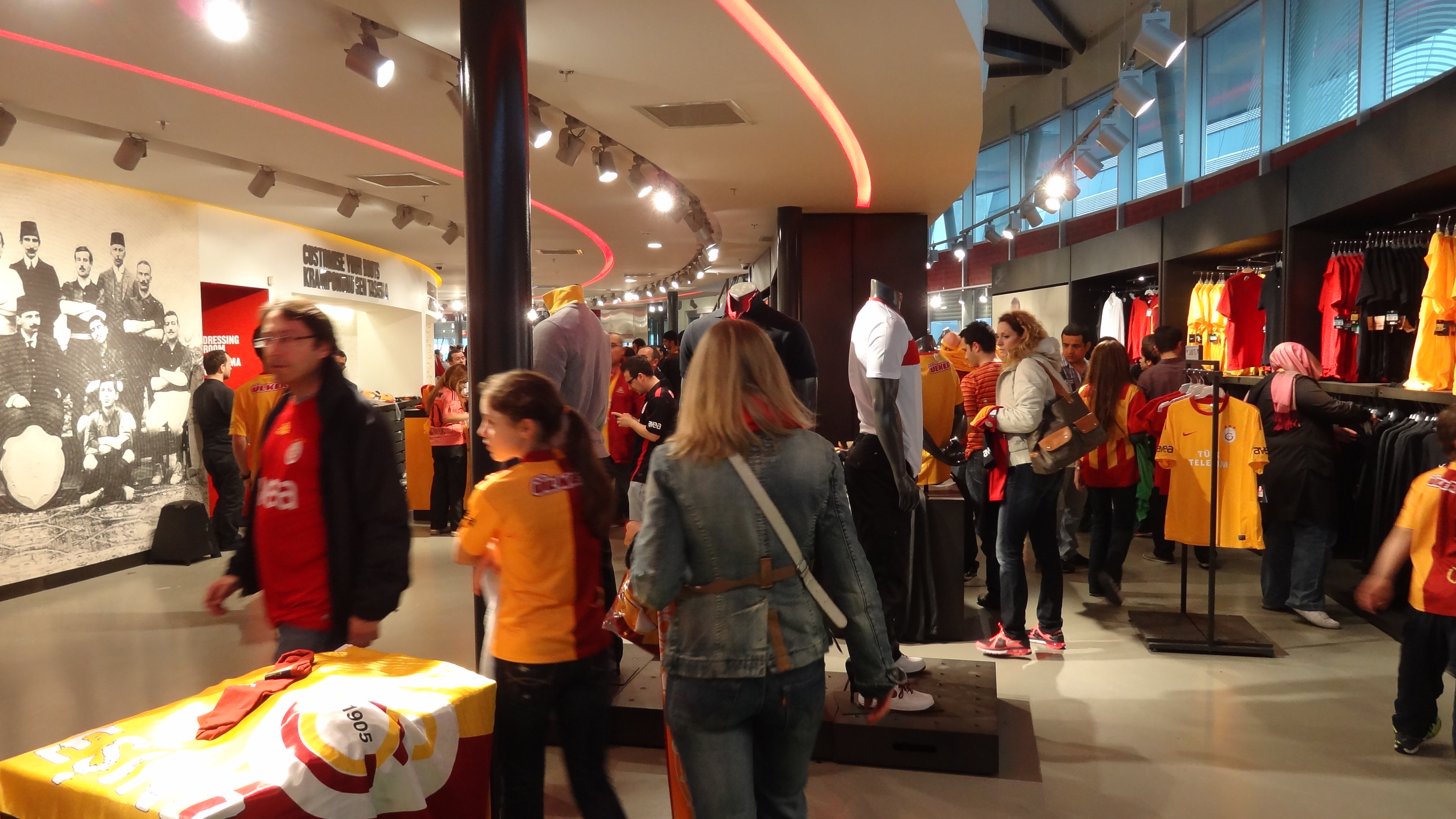
First Floor of the Galatasaray Store & Entertainment Center

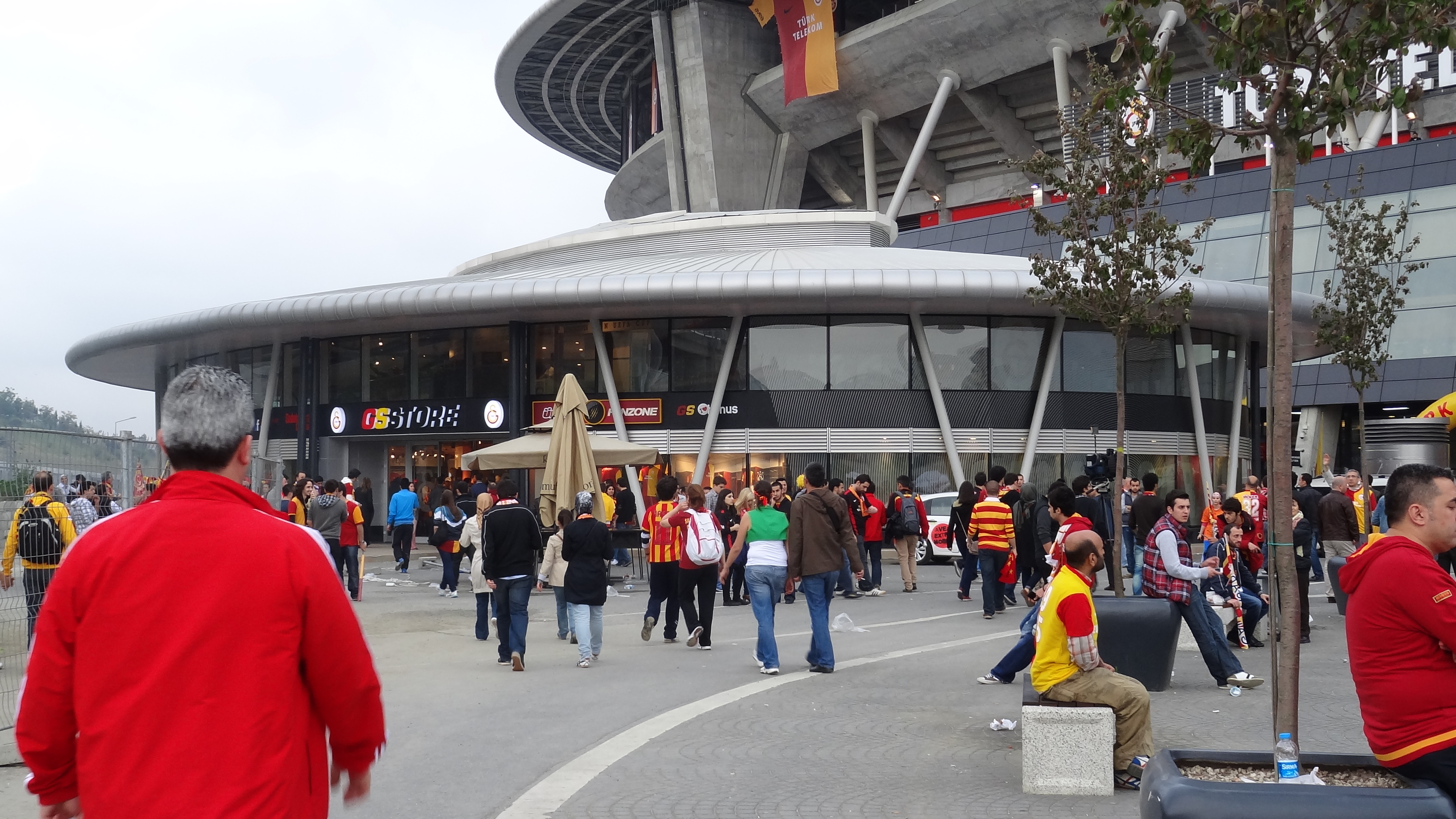
Galatasaray Store & Entertainment Center

Ali Sami Yen Sports Complex or Ali Sami Yen Spor Kompleksi is a multi-purpose sports complex in the Şişli district of Istanbul, Turkey. It is owned by Galatasaray SK. The complex covers an area of approximately 120,000 m^{2} (1,300,000 sq ft).

== Construction ==
Phase	Name	Status
1.	Rams Global Stadium	Completed
2.	Galatasaray Store and Entertainment Center	Completed
3.	Galatasaray Aslantepe Valley	Under Construction

=== Phase 1 ===
The home ground of Galatasaray is the Rams Global Stadium in the Aslantepe quarter near Maslak financial district in Şişli. The stadium, which was opened on January 15, 2011, has a capacity of 52,223 seats, making it the largest private stadium owned by a club in Turkey.

=== Phase 2 ===
Galatasaray Store & Entertainment Center was opened on February 7, 2012. Galatasaray Store & Entertainment Center covers an area of approximately 1,650 m^{2} (17,800 sq ft). The first floor is dedicated to Galatasaray Store with the help of Nike. The second floor consists of Ülker Fan Zone, Sony PlayStation, Galatasaray HDI Insurance, GS Bilyoner and Magic Pictures areas.

Floor	Section
1.	Galatasaray Store
2.	Entertainment Center

== Aslantepe Valley ==
Aslantepe Valley Sports Complex
- Interactive map of Aslantepe Valley Sports Complex
- Location: Aslantepe Valley, Istanbul, Türkiye
- Owner: Galatasaray S.K.
- Capacity: Basketball: 13,200 (+2,500 auxiliary hall) 14,000 (with lounge and VIP areas); Concerts: 15,100; Volleyball: 3,500 (+2,500 auxiliary hall); Aquatics: Variable (Olympic-standard); Judo & multi-purpose halls: 800–1,500; Esports: ~1,200; Chess & Bridge: 300–600; Athletics: Variable (World Athletics Class 1)
- Type: Multi-sport complex

Aslantepe Valley is a large-scale, multi-sport and mixed-use development planned by Galatasaray Sports Club in Istanbul, Turkey. The project is located in the Aslantepe (Seyrantepe) district, adjacent to Rams Park, and is intended to consolidate the club’s indoor sports branches, training infrastructure, and administrative functions within a single integrated campus.

The groundbreaking for the complex was carried out (April 23, 2026) at a ceremony attended by state officials.

=== Background ===
The Aslantepe Valley Project has been publicly presented during Galatasaray Sports Club general assembly and divan board meetings as a long-term strategic investment. Club officials have stated that the project aims to centralize facilities that are currently dispersed, while creating modern venues capable of hosting international sporting events and non-sporting activities such as concerts and congresses.

=== Facilities ===
==== Basketball Facilities ====
The project includes a 13,200-seat multi-purpose indoor basketball arena, designed to host domestic and international basketball competitions as well as concerts, congresses, and large-scale events. Within the same complex, a 2,500-seat secondary basketball hall is planned for Galatasaray’s women’s basketball team, youth competitions, and training activities and 600-seat basketball training hall. According to official statements, the main arena will feature 100 VIP boxes and a Sky Lounge located on the upper levels.

==== Volleyball Facilities ====
A 3,500-seat indoor volleyball arena is planned for the club’s volleyball teams. In addition, a 2,500-seat secondary volleyball hall will be located within the same structure and is intended primarily for the women’s volleyball team and development programs. The volleyball arena is designed as a multi-purpose venue capable of hosting international tournaments, concerts, and congress events, and will include 35 VIP boxes and a Sky Lounge.

==== Aquatics ====
The Aslantepe Valley Project features an Olympic-standard aquatics center consisting of two 50-metre swimming pools, one designated for competition and the other for warm-up and training. The facility is planned with spectator seating suitable for national and international swimming competitions.

==== Athletics and Other Sports ====
The project includes indoor athletics and training facilities' designed in accordance with Olympic standards. In addition, 1,000-seat dedicated halls are planned for sports such as judo, as well as facilities for e-sports, chess, and bridge, with flexible configurations depending on the type of event or competition. A parking garage for 1,500 vehicles and a multi-purpose performance hall with a capacity of 300 to 800 people will also be located within the complex.

==== Training and Camp Facilities ====
Dedicated training and camp facilities, including a 90-room camp center, are planned within the Aslantepe Valley campus for use by Galatasaray athletes across multiple branches. These facilities are intended to support pre-season camps, long-term training programs, and youth development activities.

==== Commercial Areas ====
Commercial areas are integrated into the site plan of the Aslantepe Valley Project in order to ensure year-round activity and financial sustainability. These areas include retail units, food and beverage outlets, and fan-oriented public spaces connected to both event-day and non-event-day usage.

==== Administrative Offices ====
As part of the project, administrative offices for Galatasaray Sports Club management are planned to be relocated from the existing stadium complex to dedicated office spaces within the Aslantepe Valley campus. This relocation is intended to centralize sporting, administrative, and commercial operations. The project includes a multi-storey club and accommodation building housing administrative offices, athlete accommodation, meeting facilities, and VIP areas.

== Standards ==
According to official statements, all facilities within the Aslantepe Valley Project are planned to be constructed in compliance with Olympic standards relevant to their respective sports. In addition, the project aims to meet the highest international federation requirements to enable the hosting of international competitions across multiple disciplines.

== Status ==
As of the latest publicly available statements, the Aslantepe Valley Project remains in the planning and approval phase. Construction timelines and implementation stages are subject to regulatory processes and investment structuring.

== See also ==
- Galatasaray Sports Club
- Rams Park
- Sports complexes in Turkey
