= Odeabank =

Turkish joint-stock company

- Odeabank's logo
- Company type: S.A. (corporation)
- Industry: Financial services
- Founded: 15 March 2012; 14 years ago in Istanbul, Turkey
- Founder: Farid Lahoud
- Headquarters: Şişli, Istanbul, Turkey
- Number of locations: 47 branches
- Area served: Turkey
- Key people: Khalil El Debs (chairman); Mert Öncü (CEO)
- Products: Banking services
- Owner: ADQ (96%); Public (4%)
- Website: www.odeabank.com.tr

Odeabank is a Turkish bank based in Istanbul. The bank provides services to individuals, companies, and coorporates. As of 2019, the bank had 47 branches.

== History ==
The joint-stock company was established in Turkey on 15 March 2012 as a subsidiary of Lebanon's Bank Audi. On 20 June 2012, the Company applied to the Turkish Banking Regulation and Supervision Agency (BRSA) for an operating permit and announced that it received the operating permit on 2 October 2012.

Founded by Lebanese businessman Farid Lahoud, Khalil El Debs is the chairman and Mert Öncü is the CEO of the bank.

In October 2024, the Abu Dhabi-based investment and holding company ADQ entered into a definitive agreement with a consortium led by the Bank Audi to acquire a 96% stake in Odeabank.
