= 1911–12 Galatasaray S.K. season =

Galatasaray
1911–12 season
- President: Ali Sami Yen
- Manager: Emin Bülent Serdaroğlu
- Stadium: Papazın Çayırı
- Istanbul Lig: Galatasaray SK did not participate the league
Home colours

The 1911–12 season was Galatasaray SK's 8th in existence. Galatasaray protested the Unions Club's decision regarding Adnan İbrahim Pirioglu's penalty and did not participate in the Istanbul Football League. Sabri Mahir was the first Turkish footballer transferred to a European team, Olympic Paris, France in 1911.

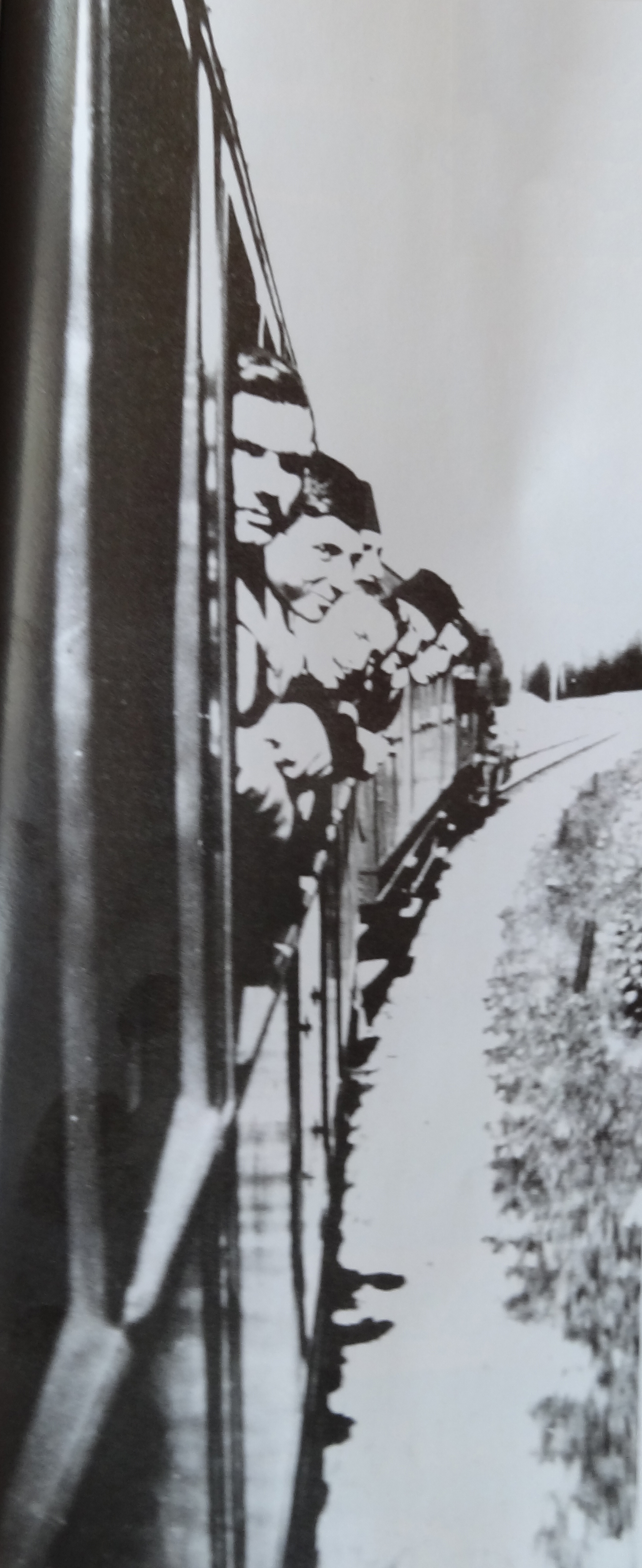
Galatasaray SK in Europe, September 1911

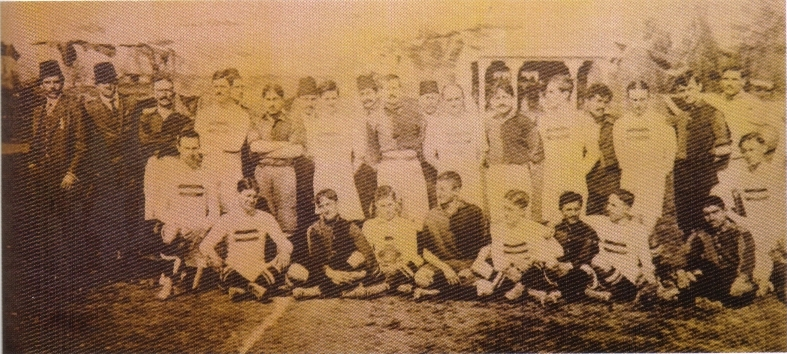
Galatasaray SK vs Kolozsvári Vasutas Sport Club

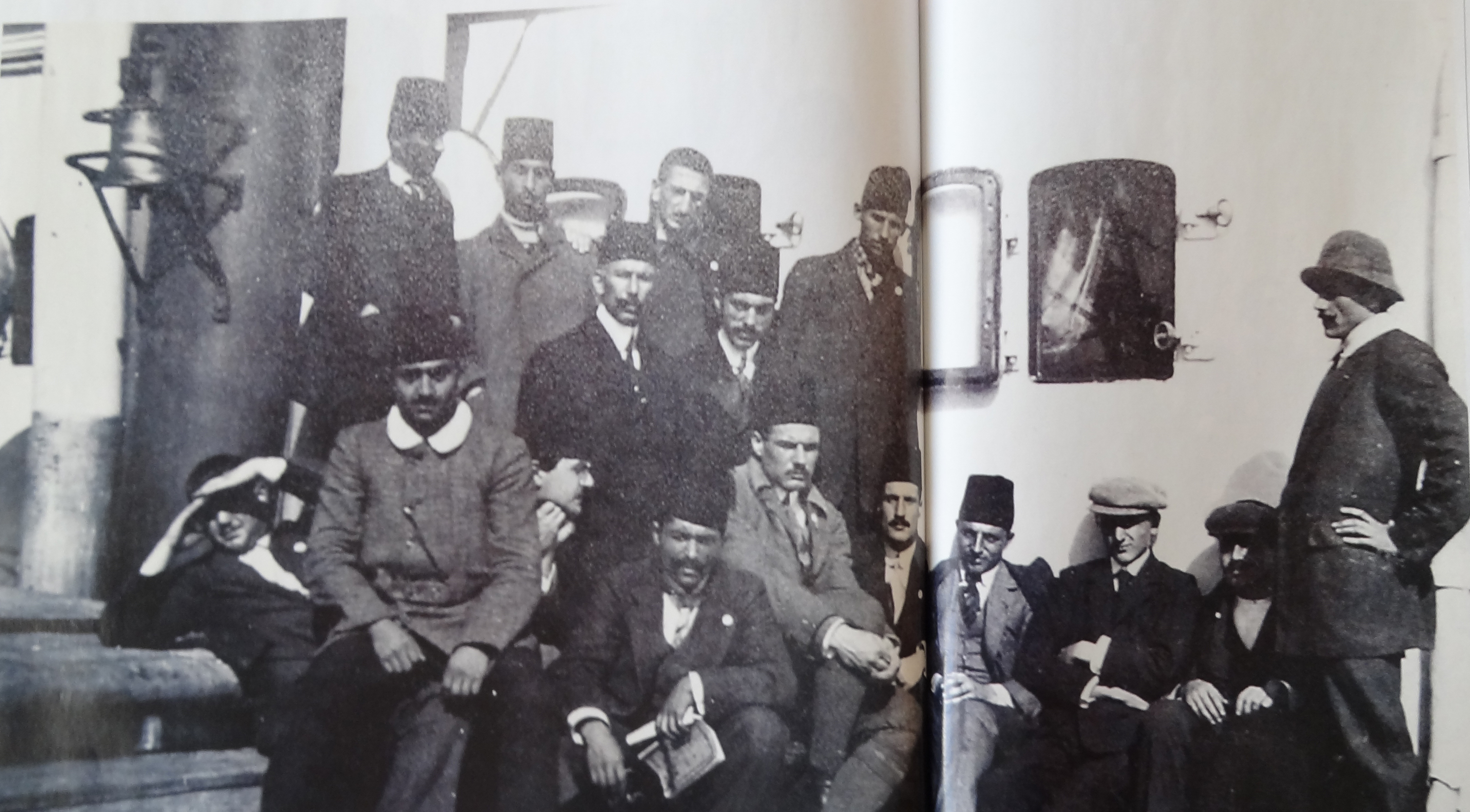
Galatasaray SK in Dacia Ferry

== Squad statistics ==
| No. | Pos. | Name | IFL | | Total | |
| No. | Pos. | Name | Apps | Goals | Apps | Goals |
|---|---|---|---|---|---|---|
| - | GK | (Turkey) Ahmet Robenson | 0 | 0 | 0 | 0 |
| - | MF | (Turkey) Celal İbrahim | 0 | 0 | 0 | 0 |
| - | FW | (Turkey) Emin Bülent Serdaroğlu | 0 | 0 | 0 | 0 |
| - | MF | (Turkey) Bekir Sıtkı Bircan | 0 | 0 | 0 | 0 |
| - | MF | (Turkey) İdris | 0 | 0 | 0 | 0 |
| - | MF | (Turkey) Neşet İsmet | 0 | 0 | 0 | 0 |
| - | MF | (Ottoman Empire) Bojkov | 0 | 0 | 0 | 0 |
| - | MF | (Ottoman Empire) Dalaklı Hüseyin | 0 | 0 | 0 | 0 |
| - | MF | (England) Rowland Rees | 0 | 0 | 0 | 0 |
| - | MF | (Turkey) Fuat Hüsnü Kayacan | 0 | 0 | 0 | 0 |
| - | MF | (Turkey) Hasan | 0 | 0 | 0 | 0 |
| - | MF | (Turkey) Ahmet Cevat | 0 | 0 | 0 | 0 |
| - | MF | (England) Cyrielle | 0 | 0 | 0 | 0 |

=== Friendly Matches ===
Kick-off listed in local time (EEST)

11 September 1911

| Galatasaray SK | 1 – 5 | Kolozsvári Vasutas Sport Club |
|---|---|---|
| | [(Report)] |

Kolozsvár, Hungary
Referee: Unknown

Galatasaray SK:
| GK | 1 | (Turkey) Ahmet Robenson (c) |
| RB | 2 | (Turkey) Neşet |
| CB | 3 | (Turkey) Cevat |
| CB | 4 | (Turkey) Hasan |
| LB | 5 | (Turkey) Bekir Sıtkı Bircan |
| RM | 6 | (Turkey) Dalaklı Hüseyin |
| CM | 7 | (Turkey) İdris |
| CM | 8 | (Turkey) Celal İbrahim |
| FW | 9 | (Turkey) Galip Kulaksızoğlu |
| FW | 10 | (Turkey) Emin Bülent Serdaroğlu |
| FW | 11 | (Turkey) İsmet |
Substitutes:
Manager:
(Turkey) Emin Bülent Serdaroğlu

13 September 1911

| Galatasaray SK | 1 – 4 | Kolozsvári Vasutas Sport Club |
|---|---|---|
| | [(Report)] |

Kolozsvár, Hungary
Referee: Unknown

Galatasaray SK:
| GK | 1 | (Turkey) Ahmet Robenson (c) |
| RB | 2 | (Turkey) Raşit |
| CB | 3 | (Turkey) Cevat |
| CB | 4 | (Turkey) Hasan |
| LB | 5 | (Turkey) Bekir Sıtkı Bircan |
| RM | 6 | (Turkey) Dalaklı Hüseyin |
| CM | 7 | (Turkey) İdris |
| CM | 8 | (Turkey) Celal İbrahim |
| FW | 9 | (Turkey) Galip Kulaksızoğlu |
| FW | 10 | (Turkey) Emin Bülent Serdaroğlu |
| FW | 11 | (Turkey) İsmet |
Substitutes:
Manager:
(Turkey) Emin Bülent Serdaroğlu

15 September 1911

| Galatasaray SK | 1 – 7 | Ferencvárosi TC |
|---|---|---|
| | [(Report)] |

Budapest, Hungary
Referee: Unknown

Galatasaray SK:
| GK | 1 | (Turkey) Hüsnü (c) |
| RB | 2 | (Turkey) Raşit |
| CB | 3 | (Turkey) Ne'şet |
| CB | 4 | (Turkey) Hasan |
| LB | 5 | (Turkey) Bekir Sıtkı Bircan |
| RM | 6 | (Turkey) Dalaklı Hüseyin |
| CM | 7 | (Turkey) İdris |
| CM | 8 | (Turkey) Celal İbrahim |
| FW | 9 | (Turkey) Galip Kulaksızoğlu |
| FW | 10 | (Turkey) Emin Bülent Serdaroğlu |
| FW | 11 | (Turkey) Ahmet |
Substitutes:
Manager:
(Turkey) Emin Bülent Serdaroğlu

20 September 1911

| Galatasaray SK | 11 – 1 | Bucharest Team |
|---|---|---|
| | [(Report)] |

Bucharest, Romania
Referee: Unknown

16 April 1912

| Galatasaray SK | 1 – 0 | Fenerbahçe SK |
|---|---|---|
| Emin Bülent Serdaroğlu | [(Report)] |

Union Club Field, Istanbul
Referee: Unknown
