= 1909–10 Galatasaray S.K. season =

Galatasaray
1909–10 season
- President: Ali Sami Yen
- Manager: Horace Armitage
- Stadium: Papazın Çayırı
- Istanbul Lig: 1st
Home colours

Galatasaray S.K. played its sixth season in 1909–1910. It was the club's fourth consecutive season in the Istanbul Football League. Galatasaray won the league for the second time.

== Squad statistics ==
No.	Pos.	Name	IFL		Total	
No.	Pos.	Name	Apps	Goals	Apps	Goals
-	GK	(Turkey) Ahmet Robenson	0	0	0	0
-	DF	(Socialist Federal Republic of Yugoslavia) Milo Bakic	0	0	0	0
-	DF	(Turkey) Neşet	0	0	0	0
-	DF	(Turkey) Mustafa	0	0	0	0
-	MF	(England) Todor Botchkoff	0	0	0	0
-	FW	(Turkey) Celal İbrahim	0	0	0	0
-	FW	(Turkey) Emin Bülent Serdaroğlu	0	0	0	0
-	DF	(Turkey) Ali Tamay	0	0	0	0
-	MF	(Turkey) Bekir Sıtkı Bircan	0	0	0	0
-	MF	(Turkey) Hasan Basri Bütün	0	0	0	0
-	DF	(Turkey) Hüseyin Eden	0	0	0	0
-	FW	(Turkey) Fuat Hüsnü Kayacan	0	0	0	0
-	FW	(Turkey) İdris	0	0	0	0
-	FW	(England) Cyrill Doupkoff	0	0	0	0
-	MF	(Turkey) Ali Sami Yen	0	0	0	0
-	FW	(England) Rowland Rees	0	0	0	0
-	MF	(Turkey) Ahmet Cevat	0	0	0	0

== Competitions ==
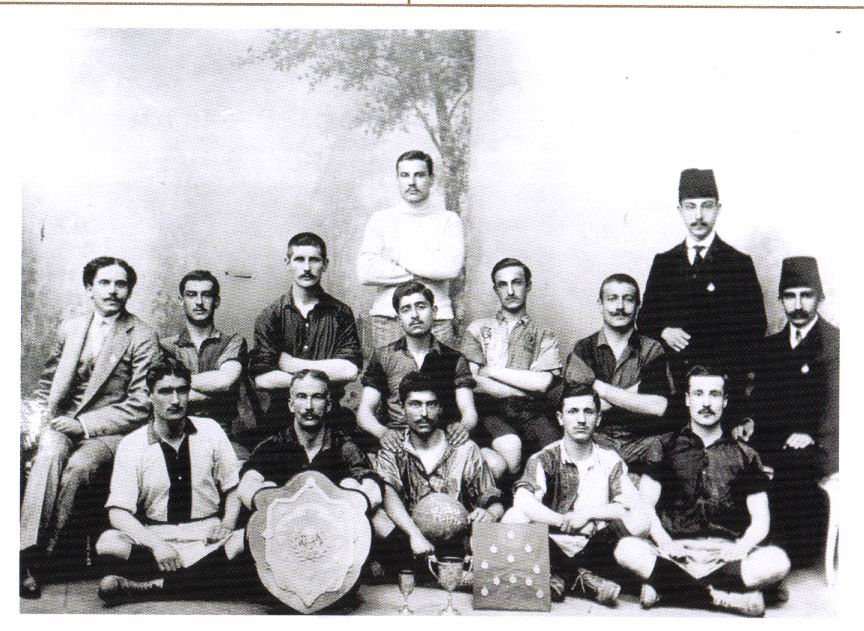
Istanbul Sunday League - Galatasaray SK 1909-10 Champion

=== Istanbul Football League ===
==== Classification ====
Pos	Team	Pld	W	D	L	GF	GA	GD	Pts
1	Galatasaray	7	7	0	0	24	2	+22	14
2	Strugglers FC	0	?	?	?	?	?	—	0
3	Moda FC	0	?	?	?	?	?	—	0
4	Cadi-Keuy FC	0	?	?	?	?	?	—	0
5	Fenerbahçe SK	2	0	0	2	0	6	−6	0
6	Elpis FC	0	?	?	?	?	?	—	0

==== Matches ====
Kick-off listed in local time (EEST)

Galatasaray SK	5 – 1	Strugglers FC

Union Club Field, Istanbul
Referee: unknown

Galatasaray SK	4 – 1	Strugglers FC

Union Club Field, Istanbul
Referee: Unknown

9 January 1910

Galatasaray SK	3 – 0	Fenerbahçe SK
Fuat Hüsnü Kayacan; Horace Armitage; Celal İbrahim

Union Club Field, Istanbul
Referee: Unknown

Galatasaray SK	2 – 0	Moda FC

Union Club Field, Istanbul
Referee: Unknown

Galatasaray SK	8 – 0	Moda FC

Union Club Field, Istanbul
Referee: Unknown

Galatasaray SK	1 – 0	Cadi-Keuy FC
	(won by decision)

Union Club Field, Istanbul
Referee: Unknown

Galatasaray SK	1 – 0	Elpis FC
	(won by decision)

Union Club Field, Istanbul
Referee: Unknown
