= Eşref =

Eşref is the Turkish spelling of the Arabic masculine given name Ashraf (Arabic: أَشْراف ashrāf), meaning "most noble or honorable". It may refer to:

== Given name ==
- Eşref Apak (born 1982), Turkish hammer thrower
- Eşref Armağan (born 1953), Turkish painter
- Eşref Bilgiç (1908–1992), Turkish footballer and manager
- Eşref Bitlis (1933–1993), Turkish army general
- Eşref Hamamcıoğlu (born 1954), Turkish entrepreneur and investor
- Ešref Jašarević (born 1959), Bosnian footballer
- Eşref Kolçak (1927–2019), Turkish actor
- Eşref Özmenç (1930–1990), Turkish footballer
- Eşref Uğur Yiğit (born 1945), Turkish admiral
- Eşref Vaiz, Cypriot politician

== Middle name ==
- Ahmet Eşref Fakıbaba (born 1951), Turkish politician and doctor
- Ruşen Eşref Ünaydın (1892–1959), Turkish diplomat, politician and scholar

== See also ==
- Eshrefids, Anatolian beylik (medieval Turkish principality or emirate)
- Eşref (magazine), Ottoman magazine
- Eşrefpaşa, neighborhood in İzmir
- SS H. Esref (1891), a Turkish cargo ship in service 1931–58, converted to a motor vessel in 1954
