= 1908–09 Galatasaray S.K. season =

Galatasaray
1908–09 season
- President: Ali Sami Yen
- Manager: Horace Armitage
- Stadium: Papazın Çayırı
- Istanbul Lig: 1st
Home colours

The 1908–09 season was Galatasaray SK's 5th in existence and the club's 3rd consecutive season in the IFL. Galatasaray won the league for the first time.

== Squad statistics ==
No.	Pos.	Name	IFL		Total	
No.	Pos.	Name	Apps	Goals	Apps	Goals
-	GK	(Ottoman Empire) Ahmet Robenson	0	0	0	0
-	DF	(Kingdom of Serbia) Milo Bakic	0	0	0	0
-	DF	(Ottoman Empire) Adnan İbrahim Pirioğlu	0	0	0	0
-	DF	(Ottoman Empire) Ali Sami Yen	0	0	0	0
-	DF	(Ottoman Empire) Celal İbrahim	0	0	0	0
-	DF	(Ottoman Empire) Emin Bülent Serdaroğlu	0	0	0	0
-	MF	(Ottoman Empire) Sabri Mahir	0	0	0	0
-	MF	(Ottoman Empire) Bekir Sıtkı Bircan	0	0	0	0
-	MF	(Ottoman Empire) Hasan Basri Bütün	0	0	0	0
-	FW	(England) Horace Armitage(C)	0	0	0	0
-	FW	(Ottoman Empire) Fuat Hüsnü Kayacan	0	0	0	0
-	FW	(Ottoman Empire) İdris	0	0	0	0
-	FW	(Ottoman Empire) Ali Müsait	0	0	0	0
-	FW	(Ottoman Empire) Abdurrahman Robenson	0	0	0	0
-	FW	(England) Clerk Comber	0	0	0	0

== Competitions ==
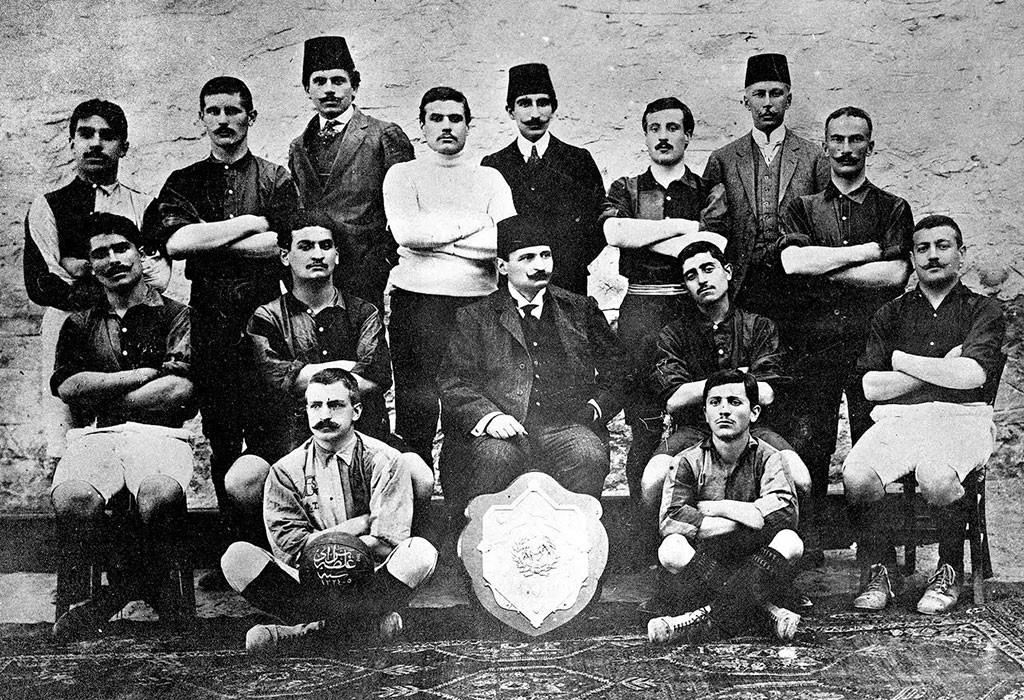
Istanbul Sunday League - Galatasaray SK 1908-09 Champion

=== Istanbul Football League ===
==== Classification ====
Pos	Team	Pld	W	D	L	GF	GA	GD	Pts
1	Galatasaray	3	3	0	0	17	0	+17	6
2	Fenerbahce	0	?	?	?	?	?	—	0
3	HMS Imogene FC	0	?	?	?	?	?	—	0
4	Cadi-Keuy FC	0	?	?	?	?	?	—	0

== Matches ==
Kick-off listed in local time (EEST)

=== Istanbul Football League and Union Club Cup Match ===
31 January 1909

Galatasaray SK	4 – 0	Cadi-Keuy FC
	(Report)

Union Club Field, Istanbul
Referee: unknown

=== Istanbul Football League ===
Galatasaray SK	11 – 0	HMS Imogene FC
	(Report)

Union Club Field, Istanbul
Referee: Unknown

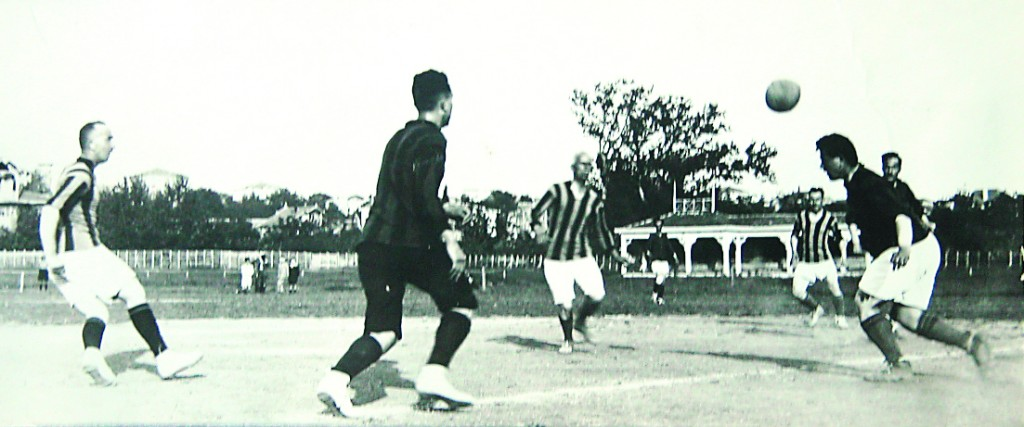
Galatasaray vs Fenerbahçe 1909

17.01.1909
14:00

Galatasaray SK	2 – 0	Fenerbahce
Emin Bülent Serdaroğlu; Emin Bülent Serdaroğlu	(Report)

Union Club Field, Istanbul
Referee: Unknown

=== Friendly Matches ===
6 December 1908, Sunday
14:00

Galatasaray SK	1 – 3	HMS Barham AFC
First match with red-yellow home kit	(Report)	the British Royal Navy cruiser HMS Barham football team

Emirgan Çayırı, Istanbul
Referee: Unknown

Galatasaray SK:
GK	1	(Turkey) Ahmet Robenson
RB	2	(Turkey) Adnan İbrahim Piroğlu
CB	3	(Socialist Federal Republic of Yugoslavia) Milo Bakic
CB	4	(Turkey) Bekir Sıtkı Bircan
LB	5	(Turkey) Celal İbrahim
RM	6	(Turkey) Hasan Basri Bütün
CM	7	(Turkey) Ali Sami Yen
CM	8	(England) Horace Armitage (c)
CM	9	(Turkey) Sabri Mahir
FW	10	(Turkey) Fuat Hüsnü Kayacan
FW	11	(Turkey) Emin Bülent Serdaroğlu
Substitutes:
Manager:
(Turkey) Horace Armitage

11 December 1908

Smyrna FC	3 – 1	Galatasaray SK
	(Report)

Istanbul
Referee: unknown

19 January 1909

Galatasaray SK	2 – 0	Fenerbahçe SK
Celal İbrahim; Horace Armitage	(Report)

Union Club Field, Istanbul
Referee: James LaFontaine
