= 1904–05 Galatasaray S.K. season =

Galatasaray SK
1904–05 season
- President: Ali Sami Yen
- Manager: Boris Nikolof
- Stadium: Papazın Çayırı
Home colours

The 1904–05 season was Galatasaray SK's first. Galatasaray SK did not join the IFL.

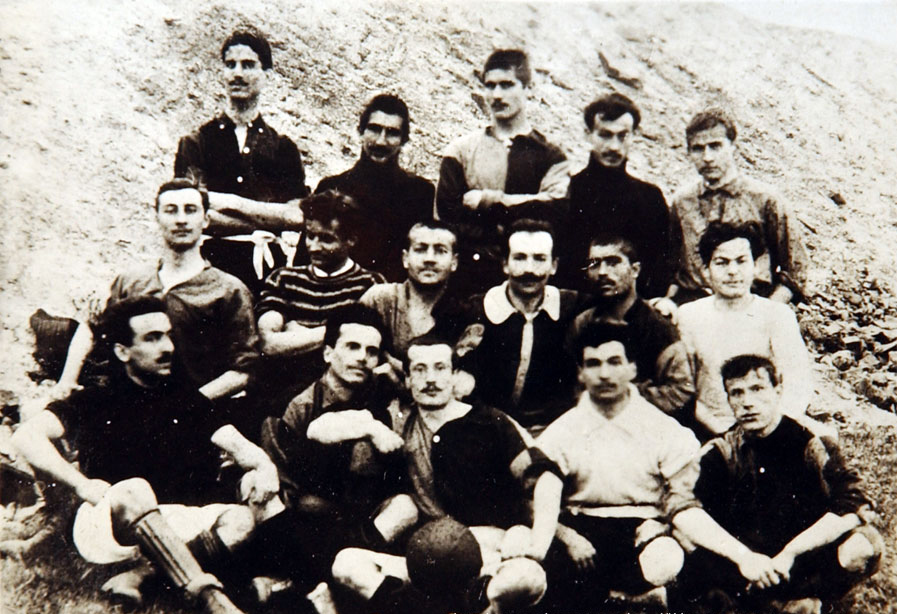

== Squad statistics ==
No.	Pos.	Name	IFL		Total	
No.	Pos.	Name	Apps	Goals	Apps	Goals
-	GK	(Ottoman Empire) Asım Tevfik Sonumut	0	0	0	0
-	DF	(Kingdom of Serbia) Milo Bakic	0	0	0	0
-	DF	(Ottoman Empire) Refik Cevdet Kalpakçıoğlu	0	0	0	0
-	MF	(Ottoman Empire) Tahsin Nahit	0	0	0	0
-	MF	(Ottoman Empire) Bekir Sıtkı Bircan	0	0	0	0
-	MF	(Ottoman Empire) Celal İbrahim	0	0	0	0
-	MF	(Ottoman Empire) Ali Sami Yen	0	0	0	0
-	MF	(Tsardom of Bulgaria (1908–1946)) Boris Nikolof(C)	0	0	0	0
-	FW	(Ottoman Empire) Kamil Soysal	0	0	0	0
-	FW	(Ottoman Empire) Abidin Daver	0	0	0	0
-	FW	(Kingdom of Serbia) Paul Bakic	0	0	0	0
-	FW	(Ottoman Empire) Ali Müsait	0	0	0	0
-	FW	(Ottoman Empire) Emin Bülent Serdaroğlu	0	0	0	0
-	FW	(Ottoman Empire) Reşat Şirvani	0	0	0	0

== Friendly Matches ==
Kick-off listed in local time (EEST)

10 November 1905, Friday

Galatasaray SK	2 – 0	Faure Mektebi
Celal İbrahim ?????	(Report)

Papazın Çayırı, Istanbul
Referee: unknown

Galatasaray SK:
RB	1	(Ottoman Empire) Nuri
RB	2	(Kingdom of Serbia) Paul Bakic
CB	3	(Kingdom of Serbia) Milo Bakic
CB	4	(Ottoman Empire) Bekir Sıtkı Bircan
LB	5	(Ottoman Empire) Celal İbrahim
RM	6	(Ottoman Empire) Hasan Basri Bütün
CM	7	(Ottoman Empire) Ali Sami Yen
CM	8	(Tsardom of Bulgaria (1908–1946)) Boris Nikolof (c)
CM	9	(Ottoman Empire) Tahsin Nahit
FW	10	(Ottoman Empire) Abidin Daver
FW	11	(Ottoman Empire) Emin Bülent Serdaroğlu
Substitutes:
Manager:
(Tsardom of Bulgaria (1908–1946)) Boris Nikolof

24 November 1905, Friday
11 Teşrinisani 1321

Galatasaray SK	3 – 0	Sobacılar FC
	(Report)

Emirgan Çayırı, Istanbul
Referee: unknown
