= 1912–13 Galatasaray S.K. season =

Galatasaray
1912–13 season
- President: Ali Sami Yen
- Manager: Emin Bülent Serdaroğlu
- Stadium: Papazın Çayırı
Home colours

The 1912–13 season was Galatasaray SK's 9th in existence. The league cancelled by the Unions Club due to the Balkan Wars. Galatasaray played only friendly matches. On 15 August 1913, Galatasaray SK was officially registered as a club. Milo Bakic, one of the founders of Galatasaray SK, died in a war.

== Squad statistics ==
No.	Pos.	Name	IFL		Total	
No.	Pos.	Name	Apps	Goals	Apps	Goals
-	GK	(Turkey) Ahmet Robenson	0	0	0	0
-	DF	(Germany) Emil Oberle	0	0	0	0
-	DF	(Turkey) Hasnun Galip	0	0	0	0
-	FW	(Turkey) Emin Bülent Serdaroğlu	0	0	0	0
-	MF	(Turkey) Bekir Sıtkı Bircan	0	0	0	0
-	DF	(Germany) Joseph Oberle	0	0	0	0
-	DF	(Turkey) Ahmet Cevat	0	0	0	0
-	DF	(Turkey) Neşet Emin	0	0	0	0
-	DF	(Turkey) Adnan İbrahim Piroğlu	0	0	0	0
-	DF	(Ottoman Empire) Mıgırdıç Dikranyan	0	0	0	0
-	DF	(Turkey) Celal İbrahim	0	0	0	0

=== İstanbul Football League ===
Galatasaray SK	0 – 0	Cadi-Keuy FC
	[ (Report)]

Istanbul
Referee: unknown

=== Friendly Matches ===
Kick-off listed in local time (EEST)

4 May 1913

Galatasaray SK	6 – 0	Fenerbahçe SK
Hasnun Galip(2); Emil Oberle(3); Bekir Sıtkı Bircan	[(Report)]

Union Club Field, Istanbul
Referee: Unknown

Galatasaray SK

Fenerbahçe SK

Galatasaray SK:
GK	1	(Turkey) Ahmet Robenson (c)
RB	2	(Turkey) Adnan İbrahim Piroğlu
CB	3	(Turkey) Ahmet Cevat
CB	4	(Turkey) Bekir Sıtkı Bircan
LB	5	(Turkey) Celal İbrahim
RM	6	(Turkey) Neşet
CM	7	(Turkey) Emin Bülent Serdaroğlu
CM	8	(Germany) Emil Oberle
CM	9	(Germany) Joseph Oberle
CM	10	(Ottoman Empire) Mıgırdıç Dikranyan
CM	11	(Turkey) Hasnun Galip
Substitutes:
Manager:
(Turkey) Emin Bülent Serdaroğlu

Fenerbahçe SK:
GK	1	(Ottoman Empire) Vahram Mateosyan
RB	2	(Turkey) Galip Kulaksızoğlu (c)
CB	3	(Turkey) Arif Emirzade
CB	4	(Turkey) Çerkez Sabri
LB	5	(Turkey) Kemal Aşkın
RM	6	(England) Hüseyin Izzi
CM	7	(Turkey) Sait Selahattin Cihanoğlu
CM	8	(Turkey) Hikmet Topuz
LM	9	(Turkey) Hasan Kamil Sporel
CF	10	(Turkey) Otomobil Nuri
CF	11	(Ottoman Empire) Miço Dimitropulos
Substitutes:
Manager:
(Turkey) Galip Kulaksızoğlu

Match officials

- Assistant referees:
  - Unknown
  - Unknown

Match rules

- 90 minutes

25 May 1913

Galatasaray SK	1 – 0	Fenerbahçe SK
Emin Bülent Serdaroğlu	GS-FB Bayramı 80 minutes played

Union Club Field, Istanbul
Referee: Raşit Aydınoğlu

Galatasaray SK

Fenerbahçe SK

Galatasaray SK:
GK	1	(Turkey) Ahmet Robenson (c)
RB	2	(Turkey) Adnan İbrahim Piroğlu
CB	3	(Turkey) Ahmet Cevat
CB	4	(Turkey) Bekir Sıtkı Bircan
LB	5	(Turkey) Celal İbrahim
RM	6	(Turkey) Neşet
CM	7	(Turkey) Emin Bülent Serdaroğlu
CM	8	(Germany) Emil Oberle
CM	9	(Germany) Joseph Oberle
CM	10	(Ottoman Empire) Mıgırdıç Dikranyan
CM	11	(Turkey) Hasnun Galip
Substitutes:
Manager:
(Turkey) Emin Bülent Serdaroğlu

Fenerbahçe SK:
GK	1	(Ottoman Empire) Vahram Mateosyan
RB	2	(Turkey) Galip Kulaksızoğlu (c)
CB	3	(Turkey) Emirzâde Arif Bey
CB	4	(Turkey) Çerkez Sabri
LB	5	(Turkey) Kemal Aşkın
RM	6	(England) Hüseyin Izzi
CM	7	(Turkey) Sait Selahhattin Cihanoğlu
CM	8	(Turkey) Hikmet Topuz
LM	9	(Turkey) Hasan Kamil Sporel
CF	10	(Turkey) Otomobil Nuri
CF	11	(Ottoman Empire) Miço Dimitropulos
Substitutes:
Manager:
(Turkey) Galip Kulaksızoğlu

Match officials

- Assistant referees:
  - Unknown
  - Unknown

Match rules

- 90 minutes

2 June 1913	Galatasaray SK	2–1	Smyrna FC	Istanbul
18:00 EET	Celal İbrahim 55'; Muhsin Yeğen 85'	(Report)	Merkez Muhacim 70'	Stadium: Union Club Field; Referee: Aydınoğlu Raşit Bey

26 October 1913

Galatasaray SK	3 – 0	Fenerbahçe SK
Emil Oberle(2); Mıgırdıç Dikranyan	Fenerbahçe Bayramı

Union Club Field, Istanbul
Referee: Unknown
