= Alp Yalman =

Turkish businessman (born 1940)

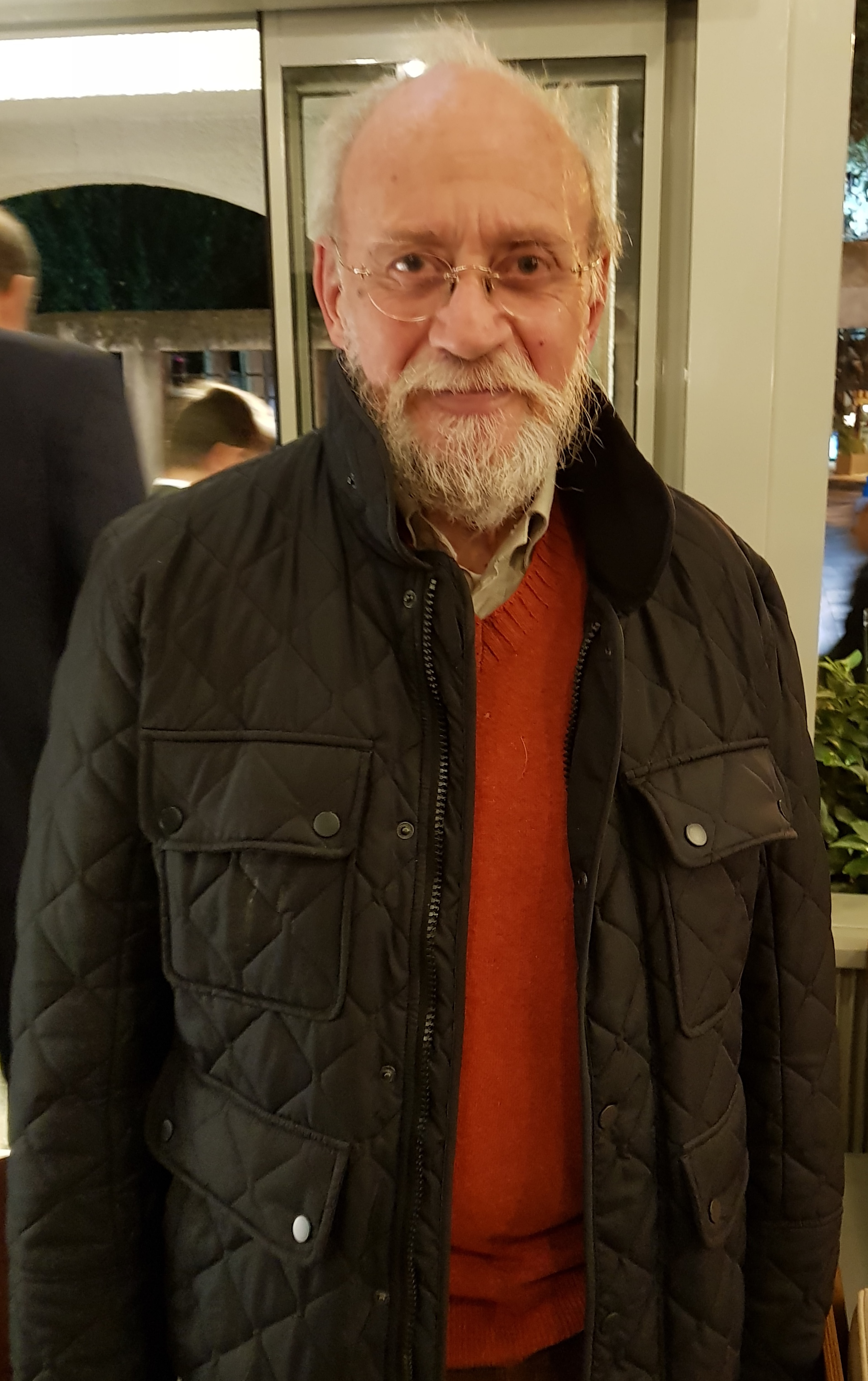

29th President of Galatasaray SK
- In office 17 March 1990 – 16 March 1996
- Preceded by: Ali Tanrıyar
- Succeeded by: Faruk Süren

Personal details
- Born: 1 January 1940 (age 86) Istanbul, Turkey
- Education: Robert College
- Alma mater: University of Lausanne

Alp Yalman (born 1 January 1940) is a Turkish businessman and former chairman of the Turkish sports club Galatasaray.

Yalman was born in Istanbul. After graduating from Robert College in Turkey, he studied Social and Political Science in the University of Lausanne, Switzerland. He is fluent in English, French and German as well as his native Turkish.

In 1973, he was brought onto the board of Galatasaray. He was elected as the president in 1990, a position he held for six years. In 2002, he returned and served few more years to Galatasaray under the presidency of Özhan Canaydın.

Galatasaray S.K. won two league titles, two national cups, and two national super cups, while Alp Yalman was the president.

He was nominated again in the 2006 election. Özhan Canaydın won the election .

After Ünal Aysal resigned from his position in 2014, he entered the presidential race with Duygun Yarsuvat and lost the election.

In 2021, he became the head of the disciplinary committee from the list of Burak Elmas.

== See also ==
- List of Galatasaray S.K. presidents

Sporting positions
Preceded by Ali Tanrıyar	President of Galatasaray SK; 17 March 1990 – 16 March 1996	Succeeded by Faruk Süren
