= History of Turkish football =

Football was introduced to the Ottoman Empire by Englishmen living in the area. The first matches took place in Selanik, now known as Thessaloniki, in 1875. F.C. Smyrna was the first football club established in Turkey. The same men brought football from İzmir to Istanbul in 1895. The first competitive matches between İzmir and Istanbul clubs took place in 1897, 1898, 1899, and 1904. The İzmir team won every match.

== Early years (1875–1923) ==
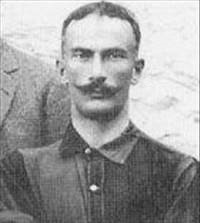
Fuat Hüsnü Kayacan, pioneering figure, who was the first ever Turkish football player and referee.

Football was played between English soldiers and sailors in Ottoman Empire in the late 19th century and it was quickly spread to the minorities, Greeks, Armenians, and the Levantines. The first teams in the Ottoman Empire consisted of Greek, Armenian and English players. One of the first matches recorded in the Empire was in 1889 between Levantine teams: Bournabat Football Club played against Constantinople FC, according to historian Mehmet Yüce.

At the time, Turkish were prohibited of partaking in sports activities and it was considered not in the culture of Islam. The first club made up of Turkish footballers was Black Stockings FC, in 1899. Police of the Ottoman Empire invaded the pitch, arresting as many players as they could. The same year, on 14 January 1889, a Smyrna selection consisted of mainly English and French players travelled to Constantinople to face Constantinople FC, another English team. The latter beat the former by 3–0 at the Yaourt Tchesme, in Moda, in front of 1000 spectators.

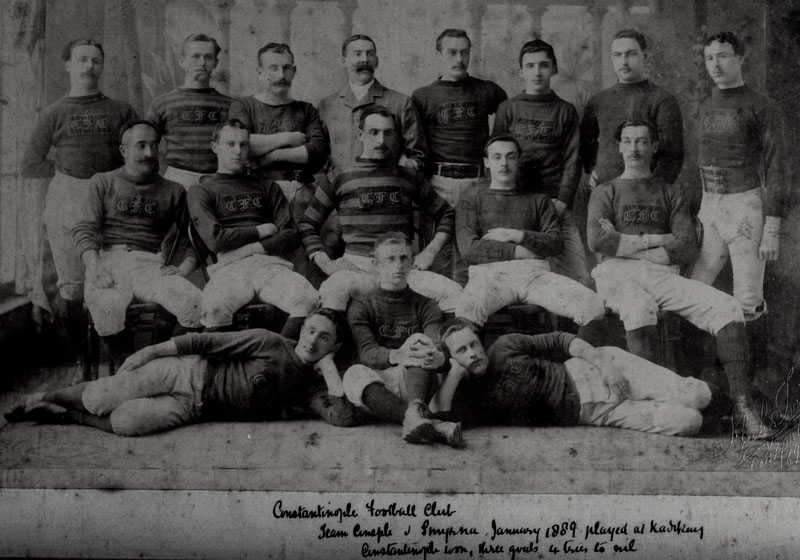
Constantinople FC after their friendly win over the Smyrna XI in 1889

Cadi Keuy FRC, Moda FC, Elpis F.C., and HMS Imogene F.C. followed the precedent set by Black Stockings. The first competitive league was created in 1904. Based in Istanbul and titled the "Constantinople Football League", it consisted the four aforementioned clubs (Cadi Keuy FRC, Moda FC, Elpis, and Imogene FC). However, Turkish players were still prohibited to compete. In the following years, things changed and the Committee of Union and Progress would encourage young Turks to compete in sports as their Greek, Armenian and Levantine peers did. Therefore, clubs of Turkish players such as Fenerbahçe and Galatasaray were founded (Still-active Turkish club with the oldest football team. Despite Beşiktaş was founded in 1903, they started football activities in 1911) were founded with Turkish players. The league was also known as the Sunday League because the matches took place on Sunday. The first club to win the league was HMS Imogene FC.

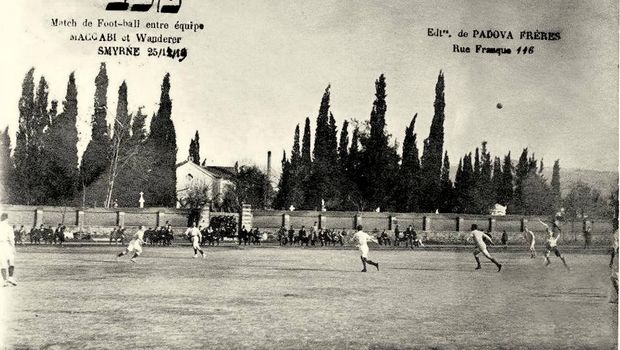
Maccabi against Wanderer at Panionios Stadium, Smyrna, 1919

Two teams from the Ottoman Empire competed in football at the 1906 Intercalated Games: Smyrna, made up of English and French players and Thessaloniki, consisted of Greek players. Both clubs lost heavily to Denmark and Athens, losing 5–1 and 5–0 respectively. However, Athens withdrew from the second place match, allowing Smyrna to compete against Thessaloniki. Smyrna won 3–0, winning the silver medal.

The first Turkish man to play the sport was a soldier on assignment in İzmir in 1898. Since the 1908–09 season there was an organised league in İzmir, known as Smyrna at the time, between Greek, Armenian and Levantine teams such as Apollon Smyrnis, Panionios, Bournabat Football Club, Maccabi de Foot-ball, Wanderer. The championship ended in 1922 with the Burning of Smyrna and the Population exchange between Greece and Turkey. Apollon Smyrnis were the most successful club with 5 titles. A new league for Turkish teams was created in Smyrna in 1915 until 1917 between Altay S.K., Karşıyaka S.K., Turan and Tripoli. Altay S.K. won 3 championships.

Another league was created in Istanbul, known as Constantinople at the time, in 1912. The league was called The Friday League, and the clubs played their matches on Friday. The league was made up of Darülfünun S.K., İstanbul J.K. (later known as Türk İdman Ocağı, who became Trabzonspor in 1967), Anadolu S.K., Sanayii F.K., Şehremini S.K., and Fenerbahçe S.K. (II). The Sunday League remained the dominant league until the 1915–16 season, when both leagues merged. The İstanbul Türk İdman Birliği was created by Beşiktaş in 1919. The league was not allowed to join the Friday League. Later on, in 1922, the Türkiye İdman Cemiyetleri İttifakı was founded. The league was made up of clubs from various cities throughout Turkey.

== After Independence (1923–1959) ==
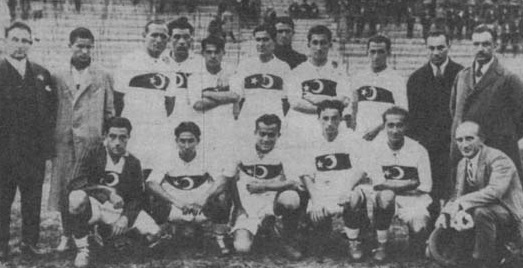
Turkey national football team in 1929.

The league helped create the Turkish Football Federation on 23 April 1923 as Futbol Hey'et-i Müttehidesi. In the same year the Turkey national football team played its first ever international match against Romania. Leagues were being created in other cities such as Adana, Ankara, Eskişehir, İzmir, and Trabzon. The Milli Küme was created in 1937 as a competition between the top clubs from Ankara, Istanbul, and İzmir. The competition lasted until 1950. The first professional leagues were established in 1952 in the big three cities. The first national professional league was created in 1959, known as the Milli Lig. After the creation of the second and third divisions, professional leagues outside of the national league became amateur competitions.

The Milli Lig (National league) was first held in 1959 with clubs from Ankara, Istanbul, and İzmir. Qualification took place in 1958 to decide who would take part in the sixteen club, two group league. Fenerbahçe were the champions of the first Milli Lig, with Metin Oktay of Galatasaray finishing top scorer.
