= Özhan Canaydın =

Turkish basketball player (1943–2010)

President of Galatasaray SK
- In office 23 March 2002 – 22 March 2008
- Preceded by: Mehmet Cansun
- Succeeded by: Adnan Polat

Personal details
- Born: 23 January 1943 Bursa, Turkey
- Died: 22 March 2010 (aged 67) Bursa, Turkey
- Education: Galatasaray High School

Özhan Canaydın (23 January 1943 – 22 March 2010) was a businessman, basketballer and former chairman of the Turkish sports club Galatasaray.

== Biography ==
=== Basketball career ===
Canaydın began to play professional basketball in 1958. In 1957, he became the youngest member of the Galatasaray organization with the registration number 155. Playing with Turkey's national youth team that won the European Youth Championship in 1962, Canaydın was also among the eight players of the Galatasaray basketball team that won the Turkish Championship. He was a member of Galatasaray cadet, junior and senior basketball teams and participated in the teams that became Turkish champions. He retired from basketball in 1964.

=== Business career ===
In 1963, Canaydın started his business career in the textile sector, in which his father had a company.

Özhan Canaydın assigned his business to professional managers after being elected as President of Galatasaray in 2002. Canaydin has also served for Galatasaray under the presidencies of Ali Tanrıyar, Alp Yalman and legendary President Faruk Süren.

Canaydin was re-elected chairman of Galatasaray on 25 March 2006. He assigned his business to professional managers after being elected Galatasaray chairman in 2002. Canaydın also served for Galatasaray as a board member under chairmen Ali Tanrıyar, Alp Yalman and Faruk Süren.

Canaydın was elected chairman for a second term on 25 March 2006 but resigned from his position in 2008 due to health issues.

He also served as the president of the Super League Clubs Union. Due to poor health, he resigned from his position in 2008.

=== Personal life ===
Canaydın graduated from Galatasaray High School in 1963 and married Asuman Canaydın in 1965. He had two children and four grandchildren. His son, Murat Canaydın also graduated from Galatasaray High School and runs the family business now.

=== Death ===
He died on 22 March 2010 from pancreatic cancer, aged 67.

== See also ==
- List of Galatasaray S.K. presidents

Sporting positions
Preceded by Mehmet Cansun	President of Galatasaray SK; 23 Mar 2002 – 22 Mar 2008	Succeeded by Adnan Polat
