= Black Stockings =

Black Stockings may refer to:

- Black Stockings, the working title of 1957 film The Girl in Black Stockings
- "Black Stockings", a 1960 single by The John Barry Seven
- Black Stockings F.C., a Turkish football club
