= Dursun Özbek =

Turkish businessman

Dursun Aydın Özbek
- Özbek in 2026

36th and 39th President of Galatasaray SK
- Incumbent
- Assumed office 14 June 2022
- Preceded by: Burak Elmas
- In office 23 May 2015 – 23 January 2018
- Preceded by: Duygun Yarsuvat
- Succeeded by: Mustafa Cengiz

Personal details
- Born: 25 March 1949 (age 77) Şebinkarahisar, Turkey
- Education: Galatasaray High School
- Alma mater: Istanbul Technical University
- Profession: Businessperson

Dursun Aydın Özbek (born 25 March 1949) is a Turkish businessman and 36th and 39th club president of Turkish multi-disciplined sports club Galatasaray S.K.

== Career ==
Özbek was a member of board of directors and vice-president during previous president Duygun Yarsuvat until 2014. Collecting the majority of voting cast with 2,800 votes, Dursun Özbek was elected as the 36th president of Galatasaray S.K. following the ordinary general assembly taking place on 23 May 2015. He was defeated by challenger Mustafa Cengiz in the election held on 20 January 2018.

On 12 June 2022, Özbek was re-elected as the 39th President of the club, after a tight contention against the other candidate Eşref Hamamcıoğlu, prevailing with a narrow difference of 156 votes in total of 4,459 given.

== Personal life ==
Dursun Özbek is married to Mesude Özbek with two children.

== Trophies won by club during presidency ==
Football

- Süper Lig: 2022–23, 2023–24, 2024–25, 2025–26
- Turkish Cup: 2015–16, 2024-25
- Turkish Super Cup: 2015, 2016, 2023

Women's Football

- Turkish Women's Football Super League: 2023–24

Basketball

- EuroCup: 2015–16

Women's Volleyball

- Women's CEV Cup: 2025-26
- BVA Cup: 2023, 2024

Men's Volleyball

- BVA Cup: 2016

Wheelchair basketball

- André Vergauwen Cup: 2017
- Turkish Wheelchair Basketball Super League: 2024-25

Waterpolo

- Waterpolo Super League: 2016-17, 2023-24, 2024-25
- LEN Challenger Cup: 2023-24, 2025-26

Sporting positions
Preceded by Duygun Yarsuvat	President of Galatasaray SK; 2015–2018	Succeeded by Mustafa Cengiz
Preceded by Burak Elmas	President of Galatasaray SK; 11 June 2022 –	Succeeded by
