= Burak Elmas =

Turkish businessman (born 1974)

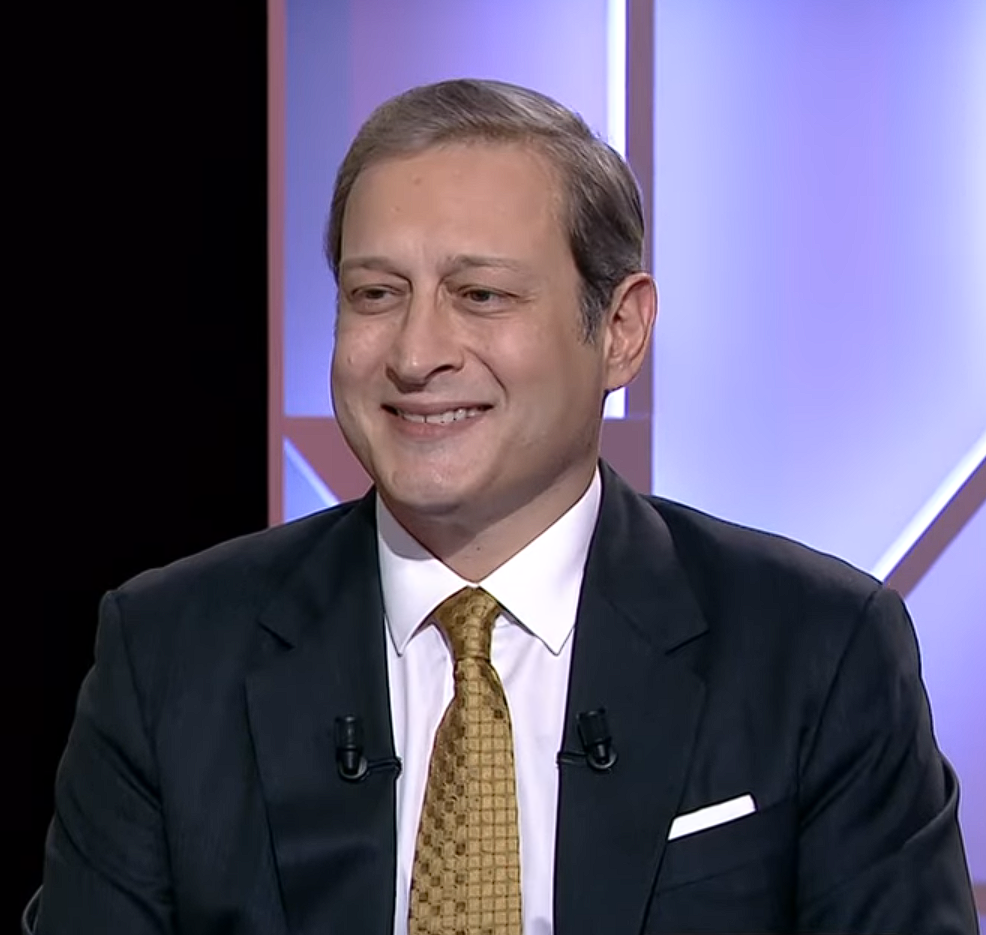

President of Galatasaray SK
- In office 19 June 2021 – 11 June 2022
- Preceded by: Mustafa Cengiz
- Succeeded by: Dursun Özbek

Personal details
- Born: 19 March 1974 (age 52) Şişli, Istanbul, Turkey
- Spouse: Yelda Süren (m. 2000)
- Children: 2
- Education: St. George's Austrian High School
- Alma mater: University of Denver

Burak Elmas (born 19 March 1974) is a Turkish businessman who was the 38th president of sports club Galatasaray S.K.

== Family ==
He was born on 19 March 1974, in Şişli, Istanbul, as the son of Sezgin and Saniye Elmas. He has two sisters named Burçin Elmas and Burçak Elmas Deniz. He is from Giresun on his father's side. He married Yelda Süren, the daughter of businessman Faruk Süren, one of the former Galatasaray presidents.

== Business life ==
Having started his business life in one of Turkey's largest independent FMCG distributors, Elmas established a UK-based international logistics company after taking a managerial role in family companies and many international joint ventures. Elmas, who has been working as a senior manager (CEO) at Godiva Investment company since 2008 and reporting to the group's board of directors, also served as a board member at Yıldız Group, one of the largest Turkish enterprises in the production of food products.

Representing the companies he worked for in his working life in senior positions, Elmas worked in various countries such as Japan, England, America and People's Republic of China during this period. Elmas currently serves as an investor partner and independent board member in three international companies in the UK and Turkey.

== Galatasaray career ==
Elmas was appointed as Galatasaray U21 team manager in 1997, when he was only 23 years old. Later, he took part in the management of Faruk Süren and Özhan Canaydın.

In the first term of Mustafa Cengiz, he was a member of the Board of Sportif AŞ.

=== Presidential career ===
On 2 March 2021, he announced that he was running for the presidency of Galatasaray (GS), and in the election held on 19 June 2021, he received 1541 votes and was elected the 38th president of Galatasaray Sports Club. Just after 9 months of presidency, Elmas has to quit from his role after didn't get vote of confidence from Galatasaray members. He also had problems with the fans, especially in the Kayserispor match on February 12, 2022, because of the failure of Galatasaray. Elmas is considered "worst president in Galatasaray history" by actor Şahan Gökbakar, who is also a Galatasaray member.

== See also ==
- List of Galatasaray S.K. presidents

Sporting positions
Preceded by Mustafa Cengiz	President of Galatasaray SK; 19 June 2021 – 11 June 2022	Succeeded by Dursun Özbek
