= Duygun Yarsuvat =

Turkish lawyer (1937–2021)

35th President of Galatasaray SK
- In office 25 October 2014 – 23 May 2015
- Preceded by: Ünal Aysal
- Succeeded by: Dursun Özbek

Personal details
- Born: 18 August 1937 Istanbul, Turkey
- Died: 10 September 2021 (aged 84) Istanbul, Turkey
- Spouse: Ayşe Nil Yarsuvat
- Education: Galatasaray High School
- Alma mater: Istanbul University
- Occupation: Lawyer

Duygun Yarsuvat (18 August 1937 – 10 September 2021) was a Turkish lawyer and former chairman of Galatasaray.

== Biography ==
Yarsuvat graduated from Galatasaray High School in 1957. He then studied law at Istanbul University and graduated in 1961.

== Death ==
On 10 September 2021, Yarsuvat died in the hospital in Istanbul, where he was being treated for an illness.

== Galatasaray ==
On 25 October 2014, Yarsuvat replaced Ünal Aysal to become the 35th president of Galatasaray, winning 1777 of the 3379 votes cast.

=== Trophies won by club during presidency ===
==== Football ====
- Süper Lig: 2014–15
- Turkish Cup: 2014–15

==== Women's Basketball ====
- Turkish Women's Basketball League: 2014-2015

== See also ==
- List of Galatasaray S.K. presidents

Sporting positions
Preceded by Ünal Aysal	President of Galatasaray SK; 25 October 2014 – 23 May 2015	Succeeded by Dursun Özbek
