= Mustafa Cengiz (businessman) =

Turkish businessman (1949–2021)

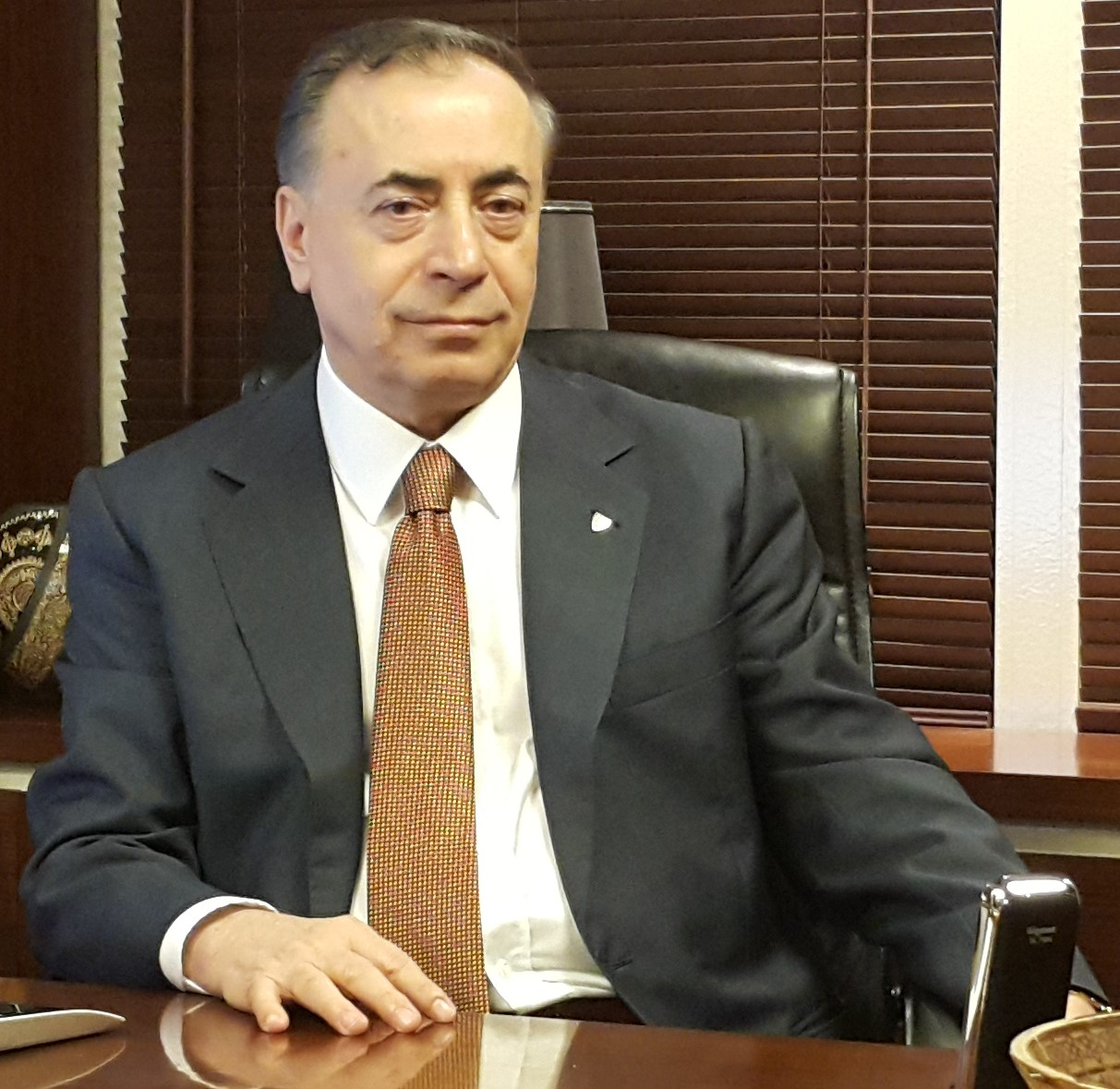
- Cengiz in 2015

37th President of Galatasaray SK
- In office 20 January 2018 – 19 June 2021
- Preceded by: Dursun Özbek
- Succeeded by: Burak Elmas

Personal details
- Born: 25 December 1949 Nizip, Gaziantep, Turkey
- Died: 28 November 2021 (aged 71) Istanbul, Turkey
- Cause of death: Cancer
- Resting place: Ulus cemetery, Istanbul
- Spouse: Hayat Cengiz
- Children: 1
- Education: Faculty of Political Science, Ankara University

Mustafa Cengiz (25 December 1949 – 28 November 2021) was a Turkish businessman who served as the president of sports club Galatasaray S.K.

== Early life and education ==
Mustafa Cengiz was born in Nizip, Gaziantep Province, southeastern Turkey on 25 December 1949.

Mustafa Cengiz completed his primary and secondary education in his hometown. He then graduated from Gaziantep High School. Then he studied at Faculty of Political Science, Ankara University.

== Career ==
Cengiz became a founding specialist in foreign trade for a cooperative of agriculture (Köy-Koop). At the age of 28, he became the general manager of the central economic organization founded by 670 municipalities (TANSA) as the youngest executive in the public sector. Following the 1980 military coup, he went to foreign trade in the private sector working in the Middle East countries using his Arabic language knowledge.

From 1990, Cengiz operated his own companies in the petroleum goods trade business. Once, he served as the chairman of the Turkish Employers' Union of Gasoline and Liquefied Petroleum Gas Dealers (Turkish: Türkiye Akaryakıt Bayiileri ve Gaz İşverenler Sendikası).

=== Sport executive ===
Cengiz was appointed a member of the by-law committee by the council of Galatasaray S.K. He was in charge of preparing a new by-law for the sports club. On 20 January 2018, Cengiz became the 37th president of Galatasaray S.K., winning with 1,703 of the 3,416 votes cast while 1,623 delegates voted for the defending president Dursun Özbek. His term ended in June 2021, and Burak Elmas succeeded him in the post.

== Personal life and death ==
Cengiz was married and had a son named Sarper who was born in 1984.

Cengiz died in Istanbul from cancer on 28 November 2021 at the age of 71. He had been ill since the first months of 2020. He was buried at Ulus Cemetery in Istanbul following day.

== See also ==
- List of Galatasaray S.K. presidents
- Faculty of Political Science, Ankara University
- Galatasaray SK

Sporting positions
Preceded by Dursun Özbek	President of Galatasaray SK; 20 January 2018 – 19 June 2021	Succeeded by Burak Elmas
