= Adnan Polat =

Turkish businessman

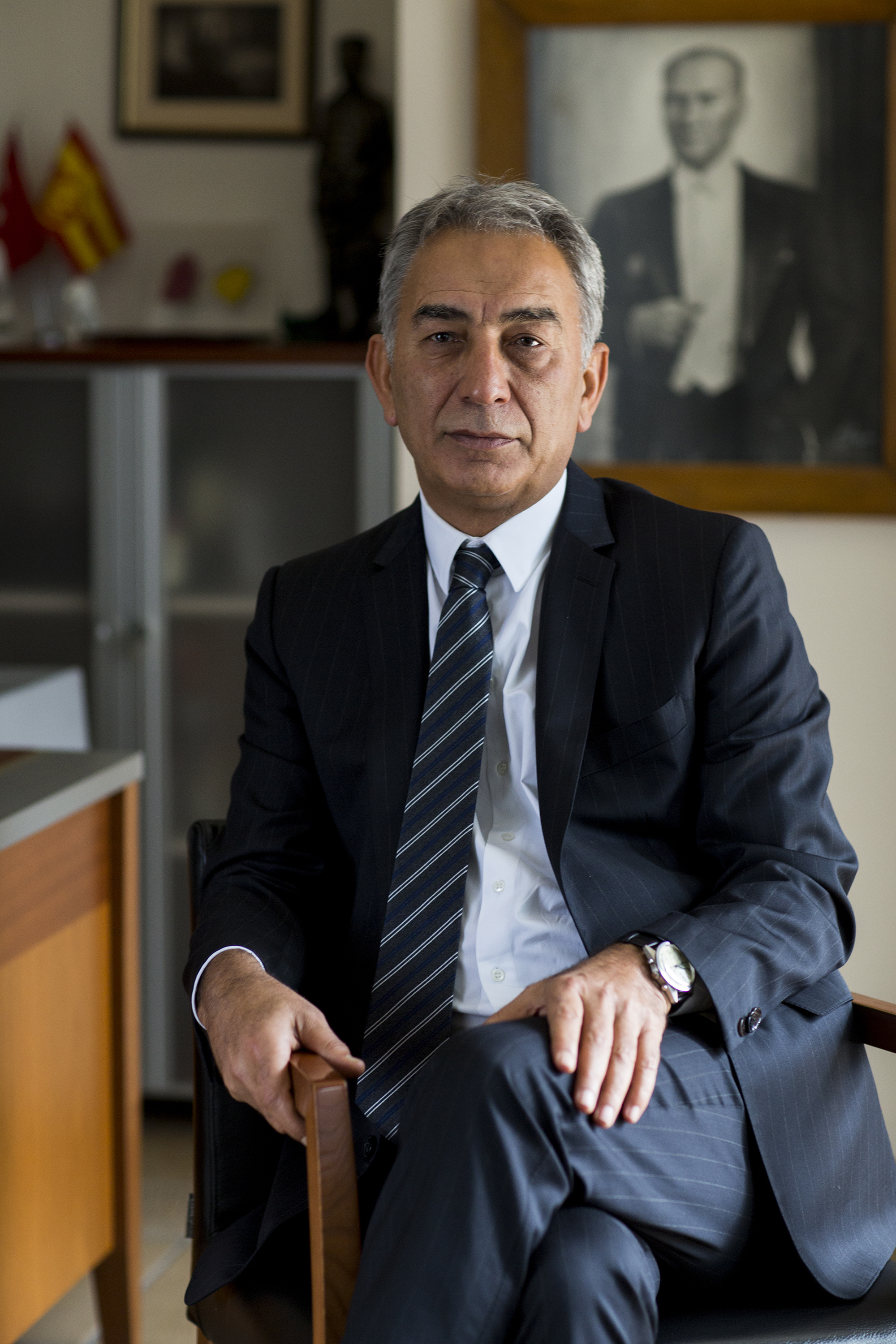

33rd President of Galatasaray SK
- In office 22 March 2008 – 18 May 2011
- Preceded by: Özhan Canaydın
- Succeeded by: Ünal Aysal

Personal details
- Born: 23 February 1953 (age 73) Erzurum, Turkey
- Children: 2
- Education: Long Island University
- Profession: CEO

Adnan Polat (born 1953 in Erzurum) is a Turkish businessman, manager and former president of Galatasaray SC.

He graduated from Işık High School in 1971 and Long Island University Business Management department in 1976.

He started working in the construction sites of Polat İnşaat Anonim Şirketi, affiliated with Polat Holding, in 1976.

Starting in 1981, he took charge of the management of the industry group of Polat Holding and made the group an international player.

Between 1992 and 1996, he was vice president and president of the Football Committee in Galatasaray Sports Club.

In 2001, he was elected president of Serkap, Association of Turkish Ceramic Coating Materials Producers. In 2002, he was elected the president of the Turkish Ceramic Federation.

Between 2003 and 2008, he was the board chairman of Ege Seramik.

In 2006, he became the vice president of Galatasaray S.K. in March.

In June 2006, he was awarded an Italian order of merit by the president of Italy given to the people for their services to society.

In 2007, he became the board chairman of Polat Holding.

He served as the president of Galatasaray Sports Club between 2008 and 2011.

In November 2013, he was the honorary consulate of the Democratic Socialist Republic of Sri Lanka in the Marmara region.

He is still a shareholder of the İ. Polat Holding A.Ş. companies, the block holder in Polat Holding A.Ş., owner of the whole of AP Enerji Tedarik A.Ş., shareholder and board chairman of Adnan Polat Enerji Yatırımı A.Ş., Batıyel Enerji Elektrik Üretim A.Ş., and İstiklal Gayrimenkul Geliştirme A.Ş. He is also the board chairman of AP Gayrimenkul Yatırım ve Geliştirme A.Ş.

Adnan Polat is involved in significant social, cultural, and sportive activities in Turkey.

Affiliated to: Galatasaray Sports Club, TÜSİAD, İKV, Istanbul Chamber of Commerce.

== See also ==
- List of Galatasaray S.K. presidents

Sporting positions
Preceded by Özhan Canaydın	President of Galatasaray SK; 22 March 2008 – 18 May 2011	Succeeded by Ünal Aysal
