= Faruk Süren =

Turkish businessperson (born 1945)

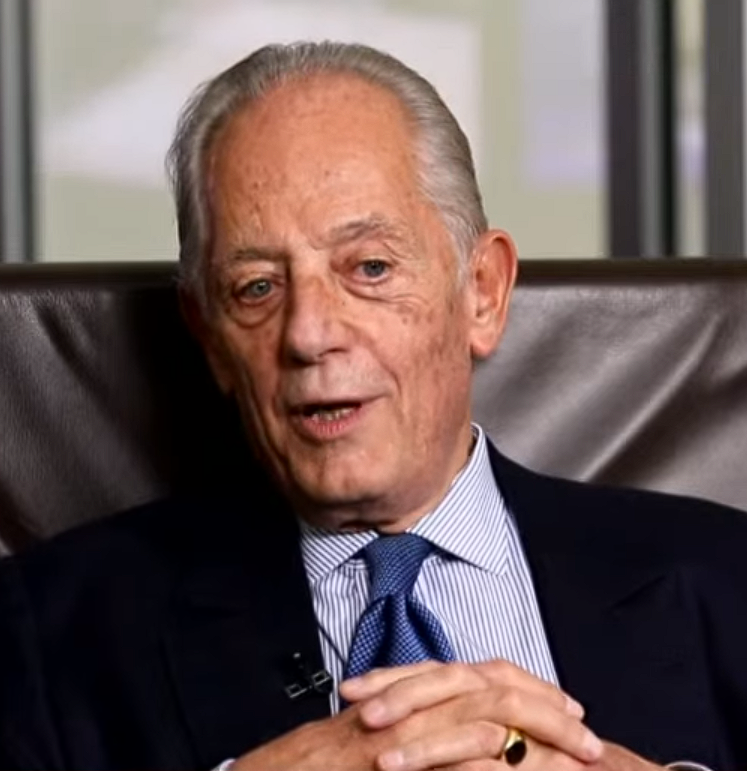

President of Galatasaray SK
- In office 16 March 1996 – 17 July 2001
- Preceded by: Alp Yalman
- Succeeded by: Mehmet Cansun

Personal details
- Born: 28 July 1945 (age 80) Istanbul, Turkey
- Education: Deutsche Schule Istanbul
- Alma mater: Istanbul University

Faruk Süren (born 1945) is a Turkish businessman and former chairman of the Turkish sports club Galatasaray S.K..

Süren was born in Istanbul as Faruk Surenyan. His paternal grandfather was Arşak Surenyan, Mustafa Kemal Atatürk's dentist. He has Armenian descent from his paternal grandfather and Italian Levantine descent from his paternal grandmother. He went to Deutsche Schule Istanbul and graduated from a German high school in Germany, then studied business administration in Istanbul University. After serving as vice-president for years, he was elected as the president of Galatasaray S.K. in 1996, a position he held for five years. He is fluent in English, French and German as well as his native Turkish. He is married and has two children. One of his daughter is married to 38th president of Galatasaray S.K. Burak Elmas. Galatasaray won the UEFA Cup and the European Super Cup would join with four consecutive Turkish league titles.

== See also ==
- List of Galatasaray S.K. presidents

Sporting positions
Preceded by Alp Yalman	President of Galatasaray SK; 16 March 1996 – 17 July 2001	Succeeded by Mehmet Cansun
