= Ali Tanrıyar =

Turkish politician

President of Galatasaray SK
- In office 15 March 1986 – 17 March 1990
- Preceded by: Ali Uras
- Succeeded by: Alp Yalman

Minister of Interior of Turkey
- In office 13 December 1983 – 26 October 1984
- Prime Minister: Turgut Özal
- Preceded by: Selahattin Çetiner
- Succeeded by: Yıldırım Akbulut

Personal details
- Born: 14 March 1914 Pravi, Greece
- Died: 25 May 2017 (aged 103) Istanbul, Turkey
- Party: Motherland Party (ANAP)
- Children: Mustafa Tanrıyar
- Education: Galatasaray High School
- Alma mater: Istanbul University
- Profession: Physician, politician, chairman

Ali Tanrıyar (14 March 1914 – 25 May 2017) was a Turkish internist, politician, Interior Minister of Turkey, chairman of the sports club Galatasaray S.K.. and centenarian, having lived to 103.

== Family ==
Ali Tanrıyar was born in Greece in 1914. He emigrated with his family, and settled in Kırkağaç district of Manisa Province, Turkey.

He was married with one child, two grandchildren, and celebrated his 100th birthday in 2014. Tanrıyar was the brother-in-law of former Turkish prime minister and president Turgut Özal.

== Physician ==
He was educated in medicine at Istanbul University. Between 1944 and 1976, he specialized under Prof. Erich Frank (1884–1957) at the same university. In 1972, he was appointed internist at the Taksim Beyoğlu Emergency Hospital in Istanbul, where he served as clinic chief and chief physician until 1979. He also served free of charge 41 years as the club physician of Galatasaray S.K. from 1942 to 1983.

== Politician ==
On May 20, 1983, he joined the founders of the Motherland Party (ANAP). He was elected a deputy of Istanbul into the parliament following the 1983 general elections. Tanrıyar was appointed Minister of the Interior in the Turgut Özal cabinet serving from December 13, 1983 to October 26, 1984. He was re-elected in the 1987 general elections.

== Sports administrator ==
Tanrıyar served as a board member of the major sports club Galatasaray. In 1986, he became president of Galatasaray S.K., and served two terms at this position until 1990. The club enjoyed success in sportive and economic matters during his presidency. In the 1986-87 season, Galatasaray football team became league champion after 14 years again. In addition, the club won titles in 16 different sports branches in his term. The football team played semifinals at the 1988–89 European Cup as being the first ever Turkish club.

== Death ==
Tanrıyar died on 25 May 2017, aged 103. He was buried at Zincirlikuyu Cemetery following a memorial ceremony in the Türk Telekom Arena, the home ground of Galatasaray S.K., and the religious funeral at Teşvikiye Mosque on 27 May 2017.

== See also ==
- List of Galatasaray S.K. presidents

Political offices
Preceded by Selahattin Çetiner	Interior Minister of Turkey; December 13, 1983–October 26, 1984	Succeeded by Yıldırım Akbulut
Sporting positions
Preceded by Ali Uras	President of Galatasaray SK; 15 Mar 1986 – 17 Mar 1990	Succeeded by Alp Yalman
