= Eşref (magazine) =

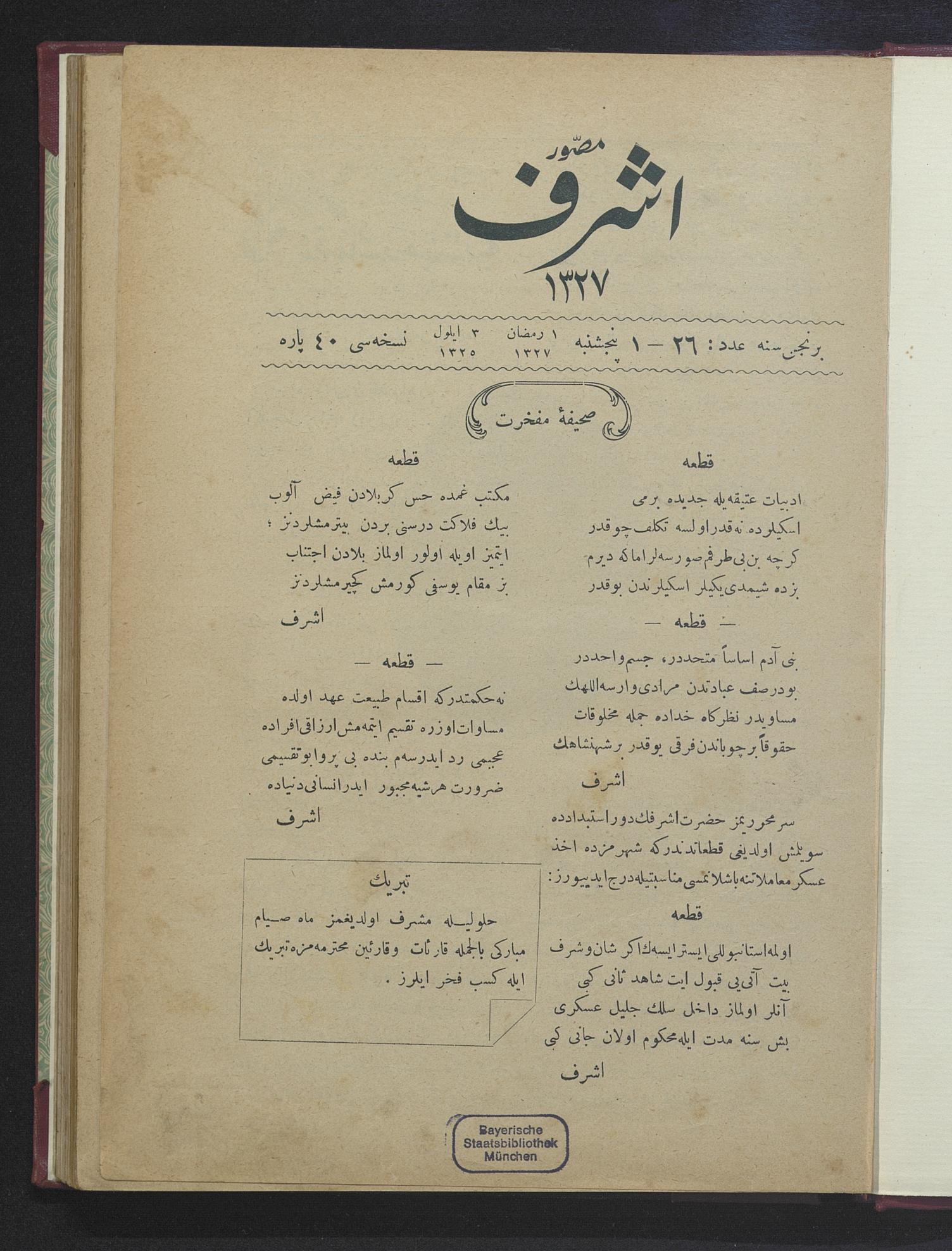
- Circulation: Weekly
- Publisher: Selanik Publishing House
- Founded: 1909
- Final issue: 1910
- Country: Ottoman Empire
- Based in: Istanbul
- Language: Ottoman Turkish
- Website: Ešref

The Ottoman Turkish magazine Eşref was published weekly from 1909 to 1910 in a total of 26 editions. The content direction was largely limited to literary themes as well as satirical portrayals and texts. The publisher was Selanik Publishing House. The magazine was headquartered in Istanbul.
