= Ünal Aysal =

Turkish businessman

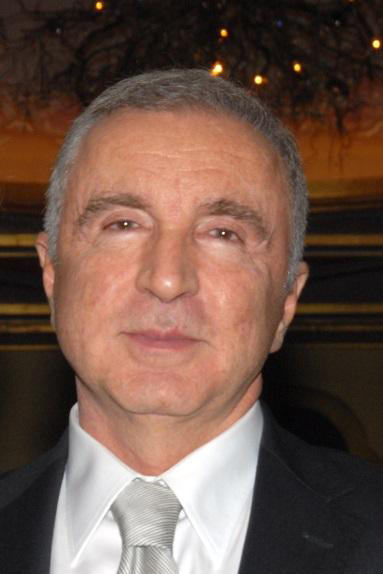

President of Galatasaray SK
- In office 18 May 2011 – 25 October 2014
- Preceded by: Adnan Polat
- Succeeded by: Duygun Yarsuvat

Personal details
- Born: 2 June 1941 (age 84) Istanbul, Turkey
- Spouses: Ahu Kerimoğlu (m. 1970; div. 2008) Fani Aysal (m. 2009)
- Children: 3 daughters
- Education: Galatasaray High School
- Alma mater: University of Neuchâtel; Istanbul University
- Occupation: Energy Businessman
- Profession: CEO
- Awards: Honoured by President of Turkey as best businessman outside Turkey(1999)

Ünal Aysal (Turkish pronunciation: [ˈynaɫ ajˈsaɫ], born 2 June 1941) is a Turkish businessman. He was the chairman of Galatasaray S.K.

== Business career ==
He graduated from Galatasaray High School in 1961. He then studied law at Istanbul University and later at University of Neuchâtel in Switzerland.

Aysal worked with Koç Holding in 1970-72 as the coordinator of the Ram Foreign Trade company and established the Unit International firm in 1974 in Brussels, Belgium. Aysal has been involved in the oil business and electric power industry, since 1984. He is currently the head of the Unit Group, which comprises 23 companies. He was honored in 1999 by the President of Turkey as the best representative of Turkish businesses abroad. As of 2011, his net worth is around $1 billion.

== Galatasaray S.K. ==
On 14 May 2011, Aysal replaced Adnan Polat to become the 34th president of Galatasaray, with a record of highest majority of votes in the 106-year-history of Galatasaray, winning 2998 of the 4019 votes cast. The previous record was set by outgoing Adnan Polat, who won 2944 of the 5234 votes during the chairmanship election in March 2008. Aysal's main target was to turn the fortunes of the club's Football team around, as well as changing the club's financial fortunes around. He brought in Former Coach Fatih Terim with which the club has achieved previous Domestic and European success to lead the shake up of the squad to help compete at the highest level again.

=== Trophies won by club during presidency ===
==== Football ====
- Süper Lig (2): 2011–12, 2012–13
- Süper Kupa (2): 2012, 2013
- Türkiye Kupası (1): 2013–14

==== Men's Basketball ====
- Turkish Basketball League (1): 2012–2013

==== Women's Basketball ====
- EuroLeague Women (1): 2013-14
- Turkish Women's Basketball League (1): 2013-2014
- Turkish Women's Cup Basketball (3): 2011–2012, 2012–2013, 2013–2014
- Turkish President Cup (1): 2011-12

== See also ==
- List of Galatasaray S.K. presidents

Sporting positions
Preceded by Adnan Polat	President of Galatasaray SK; 18 May 2011 – 25 October 2014	Succeeded by Duygun Yarsuvat
