= Black Stockings F.C. =

Black Stockings FC
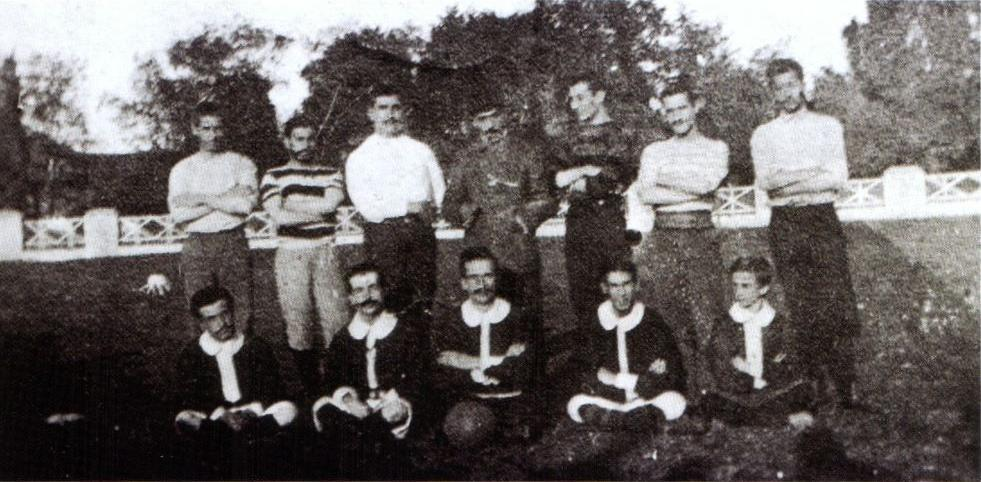
- Full name: Black Stockings Football Club
- Founded: 1899
- Dissolved: 1901
- Ground: Papazın Çayırı
- Chairman: Dr. Rasim Paşa
Home colours

Black Stockings FC (Turkish: Siyah Çoraplılar FK) were a Turkish football club based in the district of Kadıköy, Istanbul, Ottoman Empire. The club were the first football club in Turkish football history. They dissolved in 1901.

== History ==
Black Stockings FC were founded by Fuat Hüsnü Kayacan, Mehmet Ali, Reşat Danyal, Rıza Tevfik, Daniş, and Tahsin Nahit in Istanbul in 1901. The club was dissolved after their first match on 26 October 1901, because the players were indicted after the Sultan's detective Ali Şamil Bey and police raided the field. The first Turkish football player Fuat Hüsnü Kayacan played for Black Stockings.

== See also ==
- List of Turkish sports clubs by foundation dates
