= Mehmet Cansun =

Turkish businessman

31st President of Galatasaray SK
- In office 17 July 2001 – 23 March 2002
- Preceded by: Faruk Süren
- Succeeded by: Özhan Canaydın

Personal details
- Born: 24 November 1947 (age 78) Istanbul, Turkey
- Education: Galatasaray High School

Mehmet Cansun (born 24 November 1947) is a Turkish businessman and former chairman of the Turkish sports club Galatasaray.

== Biography ==
Cansun was born in Istanbul on 24 November 1947. He graduated from Galatasaray High School in 1967.

Cansun works in advertising industry as the owner of Kamera Reklam Group. In 2001, he was elected as the president of Galatasaray. In the congress held in 2002, Özhan Canaydın won the election ahead of him.

Cansun is married and has two sons.

== See also ==
- List of Galatasaray S.K. presidents

Sporting positions
Preceded by Faruk Süren	President of Galatasaray SK; 17 July 2001 – 23 March 2002	Succeeded by Özhan Canaydın
