= Eşref Hamamcıoğlu =

Turkish entrepreneur, venture capitalist (born 1954)

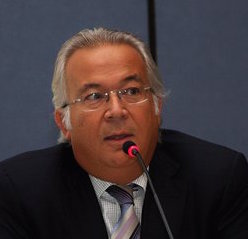
- Born: 7 March 1954; Istanbul, Turkey
- Education: Sorbonne University
- Occupations: Entrepreneur, businessman

Eşref Hamamcıoğlu (born in Istanbul in 1954) is a Turkish entrepreneur, venture capitalist, and investor. After having attended Lycée Galatasaray, he studied economics at Sorbonne University, Paris. From 1981 to 1992 he worked at Tekfen Holding as chief operating officer. In 1992, he founded Sodexo-Turkey in which he remained president and CEO until his resignation in May 2011. He remained advisor to the board of directors until January 2012. He is the president and chairman of Up Consultancy, a merger and acquisition advisory firm.

== Galatasaray ==
Mr. Hamamcioglu was the president of the Galatasaray Divan. He was elected on April 15 with a total of 336 votes.

He was previously a board member of the Galatasaray Alumni House between 1994 and 1998 under the presidencies of Duygun yarsuvat and Anıl Büyükeroğlu. In 2001 he became a board member of Galatasaray Sports Club under the presidency of Mehmet Cansun. In 2015 he became the vice president of the Galatasaray Divan under the presidency of Irfan Aktar.

== Career ==
Eşref Hamamcıoğlu founded Sodexo-Turkey in 1992. Under Hamamcıoğlu's leadership Sodexo reached a yearly Gross Revenue of 105 million euros, and represented 20 percent of the industry. At its peak, Sodexo-Turkey reached an industry record of 5,600 employees and served more than 150,000 people per day in Turkey.

Throughout his years at Sodexo he pioneered the development of the industry by setting the quality standards of the Service Industry in Turkey, made a service company get ISO certifications for the first time, educated and supervised its suppliers for sustainable development, and initiated the outsourcing of all self-operated services in several segments such as the Turkish Armed Forces, Ministries, universities, resorts, hospitals, and off-shore oil platforms. Hamamcıoğlu is the best known for being the creator of the terms of "institutional catering", "multi-service" and "Integrated Facilities Management" which today have become part of many firms' philosophy, giving him the well-deserved title of "Pioneer" in the industry.

In May 2011, Eşref Hamamcıoğlu publicly announced his resignation from Sodexo. A year later he founded "Up Consultancy" where he provides merger & acquisition advisory to mid-market size companies in the manufacturing and food & beverage sectors.

== Social life ==
Alongside his professional achievements, Eşref Hamamcıoğlu was president at the French Chamber of Commerce in Turkey, founded TUSIAD's "Institut de Bosphore-Paris" and currently forms part of its board of directors. He also holds other important positions such as board member of the Turkish Olympic Committee, TÜSİAD, YASED, and DEIK.

== Personal life ==
He is married and has one son.
