= Eşref Vaiz =

Turkish Cypriot politician

Eşref Vaiz is a minister in the 20th Government of the Turkish Republic of Northern Cyprus, under Prime Minister Ferdi Sabit Soyer. His portfolios are Health and Social welfare. He was confirmed as a government minister in April 2005.
