= Emin Bülent Serdaroğlu =

Turkish footballer

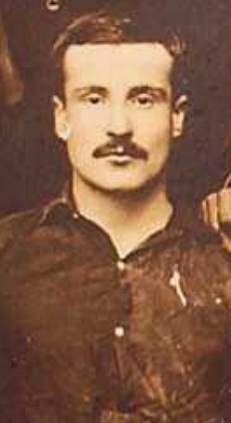

Personal information
- Full name: Emin Bülent Serdaroğlu
- Date of birth: 1886
- Place of birth: Istanbul, Ottoman Empire
- Date of death: 28 November 1942 (aged 56)
- Place of death: Istanbul, Turkey
- Position: Left wing back

Senior career*
Years	Team	Apps	(Gls)
1905–1914	Galatasaray		

Managerial career
- 1906–1907: Galatasaray
- 1911–1914: Galatasaray
- * Club domestic league appearances and goals

Emin Bülent Serdaroğlu (1886 – 28 November 1942) was a Turkish footballer, poet, and one of the founders of Galatasaray. He spent the entirety of his career with his hometown club. His grandfather was Serdar-ı Ekrem Ömer Pasha and his father was Ömer Muzaffer Bey. He lost his mother during childhood. He graduated from Galatasaray High School in 1905 and became the first Turkish captain of Galatasaray SK.

As a poet, he was a pioneer of the Fecr-i Âtî ("Dawn of the Future") movement, one of three movements of early Turkish literature. His poems Kin (1910) and Hisarlara Karşı are especially well known.

== Honours ==
=== As player ===
Galatasaray SK

- Istanbul Football League: 1908–09, 1909–10, 1910–11
