= Fuat Hüsnü Kayacan =

Turkish footballer (1879–1963)

Fuat Hüsnü
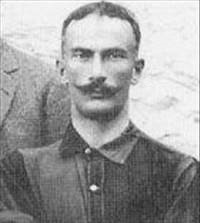
- Born: 1879
- Died: 1963 (aged 83–84)

Fuat Hüsnü Kayacan (1879–1963) was a Turkish footballer, manager, referee and pioneering figure. He was the first ever Turkish footballer and referee. He got involved in the sport of football when he was a soldier on assignment in İzmir in 1898. He was the younger brother of Hamit Hüsnü Kayacan.

Being a native of the Kadıköy district on the Asian side of Istanbul, Kayacan was among the founding line-ups of both Black Stockings FC and Fenerbahçe. He also played for Galatasaray.
