= Celal İbrahim =

Turkish footballer

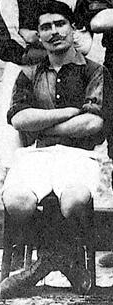

Personal information
- Full name: Celal İbrahim
- Date of birth: 1889
- Place of birth: Malatya, Ottoman Empire
- Date of death: 21 March 1917 (aged 33)
- Place of death: Baghdad, Ottoman Empire
- Position: Left wing back

Senior career*
Years	Team	Apps	(Gls)
1905–1915	Galatasaray		
- * Club domestic league appearances and goals

Celal İbrahim (1884 – 21 March 1917) was an Ottoman footballer of Kurdish origin and one of the founders of Galatasaray. He was also known as Kürt Celal which translates in English as Kurdish Celal.

== Career ==
İbrahim spent the entirety of his career with Galatasaray, his hometown club. He once scored 4 goals against Fenerbahçe in a single match on 12 February 1911.

== Death ==
He was killed in action in the Defense of Baghdad, Iraq on 21 March 1917.

== Honours ==
Galatasaray

- Istanbul Football League: 1908–09, 1909–10, 1910–11, 1914–15
