= List of Galatasaray S.K. presidents =

Galatasaray SK is a sports club based in Istanbul, Turkey, that competes in Süper Lig, the most senior football league in Turkey. Since its founding in 1905, the club has had 37 different presidents. The club is owned by the club-members of Galatasay SK, and similarly to a limited liability company, they elect the president by a ballot. The president has the responsibility for the overall management of the club, including formally signing contracts with players and staff. In Turkey, it is customary for the president to watch the games in which the first-team participates, together with the president from the opposing team.

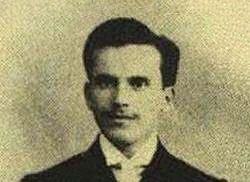
Ali Sami Yen was Galatasaray SK's founder and one of the first players.

Since its foundation, Galatasaray SK has been owned and operated only by its members (all Turkish), unlike most European football clubs. Ali Sami Yen remains the longest-running president of The Lions (14 years, from 1905 to 1919).

== List of presidents ==
Below is the official presidential history of Galatasaray SK, from when Ali Sami Yen took over at the club in 1905, until the present day.

Date	Name (club membership no.)	Galatasaray Football Team								Galatasaray Men's; Basketball Team	Galatasaray Women's; Basketball Team	Galatasaray Men's; Volleyball Team	Galatasaray Women's; Volleyball Team	Galatasaray; Waterpolo; Team	Galatasaray; Swimming; Team	Galatasaray; Athletics; Team	Galatasaray; Rowing; Team	Galatasaray; Sailing; Team
Date	Name (club membership no.)	Istanbul; League /Istanbul; Cup/ Milli; Küme	TSYD Cup	Turkish; Football; Championship	Turkish Super Cup	Turkish Cup	UEFA Cup	UEFA Super Cup	UEFA Champions League	Istanbul; League /Turkish; Basketball; Championship/Turkish; Basketball; League/Turkish; Cup/President's; Cup	Turkish Women's; Basketball League/Turkish; Cup/Turkish; President; Cup/EuroLeague; Women/FIBA; EuroCup/European; SuperCup	Istanbul; League/Turkish Women's; Volleyball League/CEV Challenge CUP	Istanbul; League/Turkish Women's; Volleyball League	Turkish; Waterpolo League	Turkish; Swimming Championship Winter/Summer	Turkish; Athletics Championship İstanbul/Turkey Winter/Summer	Turkish; Rowing Championship Winter/Summer	Turkish; Sailing Championship (Summer)
Date	Name (club membership no.)	Men's								Men's	Women's	Men's	Women's	Men's	Men's and Women's	Men's and Women's	Men's and Women's	Men's and Women's
30 October 1905- 15 May 1919	Ali Sami Yen(1); 1. Presidency		x	x	x	x	x	x	x	x	x	x	x	x	x	x	x	x
15 May 1919- 10 December 1922	Refik Cevdet Kalpakçıoğlu(7); 1. Presidency		x	x	x	x	x	x	x	x	x	x	x	x	x	x	x	x
10 December 1922- 23 April 1925	Yusuf Ziya Öniş(235); 1. Presidency	x	x	x	x	x	x	x	x	x	x	x	x	x	x		x	x
23 April 1925- 17 July 1925	Ali Sami Yen(1); 2. Presidency		x	x	x	x	x	x	x	x	x	x	x	x	x		x	x
17 July 1925- 5 September 1925	Ahmet Robenson(9)		x	x	x	x	x	x	x	x	x	x	x	x	x		x	x
5 September 1925- 25 September 1926	Ali Haydar Şekip(259)	x	x	x	x	x	x	x	x	x	x	x	x	x	x	x	x	x
25 September 1926- 1 January 1928	Adnan İbrahim Pirioğlu(10)		x	x	x	x	x	x	x	x	x	x	x	x	x		x	x
1 January 1928- 25 October 1929	Necmettin Sadık Sadak(350)		x	x	x	x	x	x	x	x	x	x	x	x	x	x	x	x
25 October 1929- 18 July 1930	Abidin Daver(8)	x	x	x	x	x	x	x	x	x	x	x	x	x	x	x	x	x
18 July 1930- 26 June 1931	Ahmet Kara(17); 1. Presidency		x	x	x	x	x	x	x	x	x	x	x	x	x		x	x
26 June 1931- 15 January 1932	Tahir Kevkep(513)	x	x	x	x	x	x	x	x	x	x	x	x	x	x	x	x	x
15 January 1932- 19 February 1932	Ali Haydar Barşal(30); 1. Presidency	x	x	x	x	x	x	x	x	x	x	x	x	x	x		x	x
19 February 1932- 11 March 1932	Ahmet Kara(17); 2. Presidency	x	x	x	x	x	x	x	x	x	x	x	x	x	x		x	x
11 March 1932- 3 February 1933	Fethi İsfendiyaroğlu(40)	x	x	x	x	x	x	x	x		x		x	x	x		x	x
3 February 1933- 12 August 1934	Ali Haydar Barşal(30); 2. Presidency	x	x	x	x	x	x	x	x		x	x	x	x	x	x	x	x
12 August 1934- 8 February 1935	Refik Cevdet Kalpakçıoğlu(7); 2. Presidency	x	x	x	x	x	x	x	x	x	x	x	x	x	x	x	x	x
8 February 1935- 3 April 1937	Prof. Dr. Ethem Menemencioğlu(1185)	x	x	x	x	x	x	x	x		x		x	x	x	x	x	x
3 April 1937- 15 December 1937	Saim Gogen(380)	x	x	x	x	x	x	x	x		x	x	x	x	x	x	x	x
15 December 1937- 8 April 1939	Sedat Ziya Kantoğlu(1277); 1. Presidency	x	x	x	x	x	x	x	x	x	x	x	x	x	x	x	x	x
8 April 1939- 27 August 1939	Nazmi Nuri Köksal(1005)	x/x/	x	x	x	x	x	x	x	x	x	x	x	x	x	x	x	x
27 August 1939- 21 October 1939	Adnan Akıska(437))	x	x	x	x	x	x	x	x	x	x	x	x	x	x	x	x	x
21 October 1939- 10 May 1940	Sedat Ziya Kantoğlu(1277); 2. Presidency	x	x	x	x	x	x	x	x	x	x	x	x	x	x	x	x	x
10 May 1940- 21 November 1942	Tevfik Ali Çınar(1539)	x	x	x	x	x	x	x	x		x	x	x	x	x		x	x
21 November 1942- 1 January 1944	Osman Dardağan(762)	x//x	x	x	x	x	x	x	x		x	x	x	x	x	x	x	x
1 January 1944- 23 September 1944	Sedat Ziya Kantoğlu(1277); 3. Presidency	x	x	x	x	x	x	x	x	x	x		x	x	x	x	x	x
23 September 1944- 31 August 1946	Muslihittin Peykoğlu(416)	x	x	x	x	x	x	x	x		x		x	x	x		x	x
31 August 1946- 21 November 1950	Suphi Batur(548); 1. Presidency		x	x	x	x	x	x	x	/	x		x	x	x	x	x	x
21 November 1950- 30 March 1953	Yusuf Ziya Öniş(235); 2. Presidency	x	x	x	x	x	x	x	x		x	x	x	x	x			x
30 March 1953- 30 November 1954	Ulvi Yenal(835); 1. Presidency	x	x	x	x	x	x	x	x	/	x		x	x	x	x		x
30 November 1954- 11 January 1957	Refik Selimoğlu(548); 1. Presidency		x	x	x	x	x	x	x	x/	x	/	x		x	x		x
Date	Name (club membership no.)	Galatasaray Professional Football Team								Galatasaray Men's; Basketball Team	Galatasaray Women's; Basketball Team	Galatasaray Men's; Volleyball Team	Galatasaray Women's; Volleyball Team	Galatasaray; Waterpolo; Team	Galatasaray; Swimming; Team	Galatasaray; Athletics; Team	Galatasaray; Rowing; Team	Galatasaray; Sailing; Team
Date	Name (club membership no.)	Istanbul; League /Istanbul; Cup/ Milli; Küme	TSYD Cup	Turkish; Football; Championship	Turkish Super Cup	Turkish Cup	UEFA Cup	UEFA Super Cup	UEFA Champions League	Istanbul; League /Turkish; Basketball; Championship/Turkish; Basketball; League/Turkish; Cup/President's; Cup	Turkish Women's; Basketball League/Turkish; Cup/Turkish; President; Cup/EuroLeague; Women/FIBA; EuroCup/European; SuperCup	Istanbul; League/Turkish; Championship/Turkish Men's; Volleyball League	Istanbul; League/Turkish Women's; Volleyball League/CEV Challenge CUP	Turkish; Waterpolo League	Turkish; Swimming Championship Winter/Summer	Turkish; Athletics Championship İstanbul/Turkey Winter/Summer	Turkish; Rowing Championship Winter/Summer	Turkish; Sailing Championship (Summer)
Professional Seasons		Men's								Men's	Women's	Men's	Women's	Men's	Men's and Women's	Men's and Women's	Men's and Women's	Men's and Women's
11 January 1957- 2 January 1960	Sadık Giz(1162)		x	x	x	x	x	x	x		x	/	x		x	x		x
2 January 1960- 27 January 1962	Refik Selimoğlu(548); 2. Presidency	x	x		x	x	x	x	x	/	x	/	/	x	x	x	x	x
27 January 1962- 13 February 1965	Ulvi Yenal(835); 2. Presidency	x			x		x	x	quarter-final	x/	x	/	/	x	x		x	x
13 February 1965- 18 January 1969	Suphi Batur(548); 2. Presidency	x		x			x	x	x	x/	x	/	/	x	x			x
18 January 1969- 3 February 1973	Selahattin Beyazıt(3597); 1. Presidency	x				x	x	x	quarter-final	x/x//	x	x/x/	x	x	x
3 February 1973- 14 June 1975	Mustafa Pekin(1747)	x	x		x		x	x	x	x	x	x	x		x
14 June 1975- 27 January 1979	Selahattin Beyazıt(3597); 2. Presidency	x		x	x		x	x	x	x	x	x	/x/x		x		x	x
27 January 1979- 15 March 1986	Prof. Dr. Ali Uras(3098)	x		x			x	x	x	x/x//	x	x	x	x			x	x
15 March 1986- 17 March 1990	Dr. Ali Tanrıyar(1765)	x				x	x	x	semi-final	x/x//		x/x/	x	x				x
17 March 1990- 16 March 1996	Alp Yalman(3660)	x					x	x	quarter-final	x/x//	//	x	x			x		x
16 March 1996- 17 July 2001	Faruk Süren(5269)	x							quarter-final		///Final Four/x/x	x	x			x
17 July 2001- 23 March 2002	Mehmet Cansun(4697)	x	x	x	x	x	x	x	x	x	x	x	x	x		x	x	x
23 March 2002- 22 March 2008	Özhan Canaydın(4569)	x	x		x		x	x	x	x	x	x	x			x		x
22 March 2008- 18 May 2011	Adnan Polat(7708)	x	x			x	x	x	x	x	x///x//Runner Up	x	x/x/Bronze		x	x	x	x
18 May 2011 – 25 October 2014	Ünal Aysal(11629)	x	x						quarter final
25 October 2014 – 23 May 2015	Prof. Dr. Duygun Yarsuvat(3666)	x	x		x		x	x	x	x		x	x	x	x	x	x	x
23 May 2015 – 20 January 2018	Dursun Aydın Özbek(6602); 1. Presidency	x	x	x			x	x	x	x	x	x	x	x	x	x	x	x
20 January 2018 – 19 June 2021	Mustafa Cengiz(10649)	x	x				x	x	x	x	x	x	x	x	x	x	x	x
19 June 2021 – 11 June 2022	Burak Elmas(9320)	x	x	x	x	x	x	x	x	x	x	x	x	x	x	x	x	x
11 June 2022 –	Dursun Aydın Özbek(6602); 2. Presidency	x	x				x	x	x	x	x	x	x	x		x	x	x
