= List of one-club men in association football =

This article is a list of one-club men, footballers who have played their entire professional career with only one club.

== Retired players ==
Players must have been at their club for a minimum of ten years to be included here. Loan spells at other teams disqualify players from being counted in the list. Only seasons with appearances in the senior first team are counted.

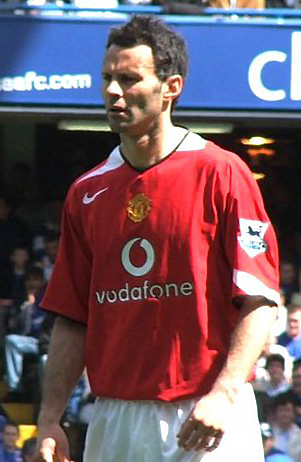
Manchester United midfielder Ryan Giggs appeared in 963 matches over 24 seasons. Giggs is also one of only two players (alongside James Milner) to play in 22 successive Premier League seasons, and the only player to score in 21 successive Premier League seasons. Giggs won 34 trophies during his career with Manchester United.

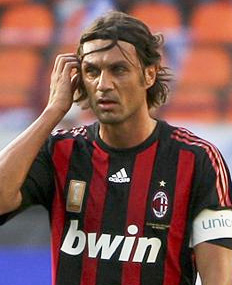
Former AC Milan captain Paolo Maldini appeared in 647 league matches and 902 matches overall, spanning over 25 consecutive seasons. Maldini won 26 trophies with Milan, and played the second-most matches in Serie A.

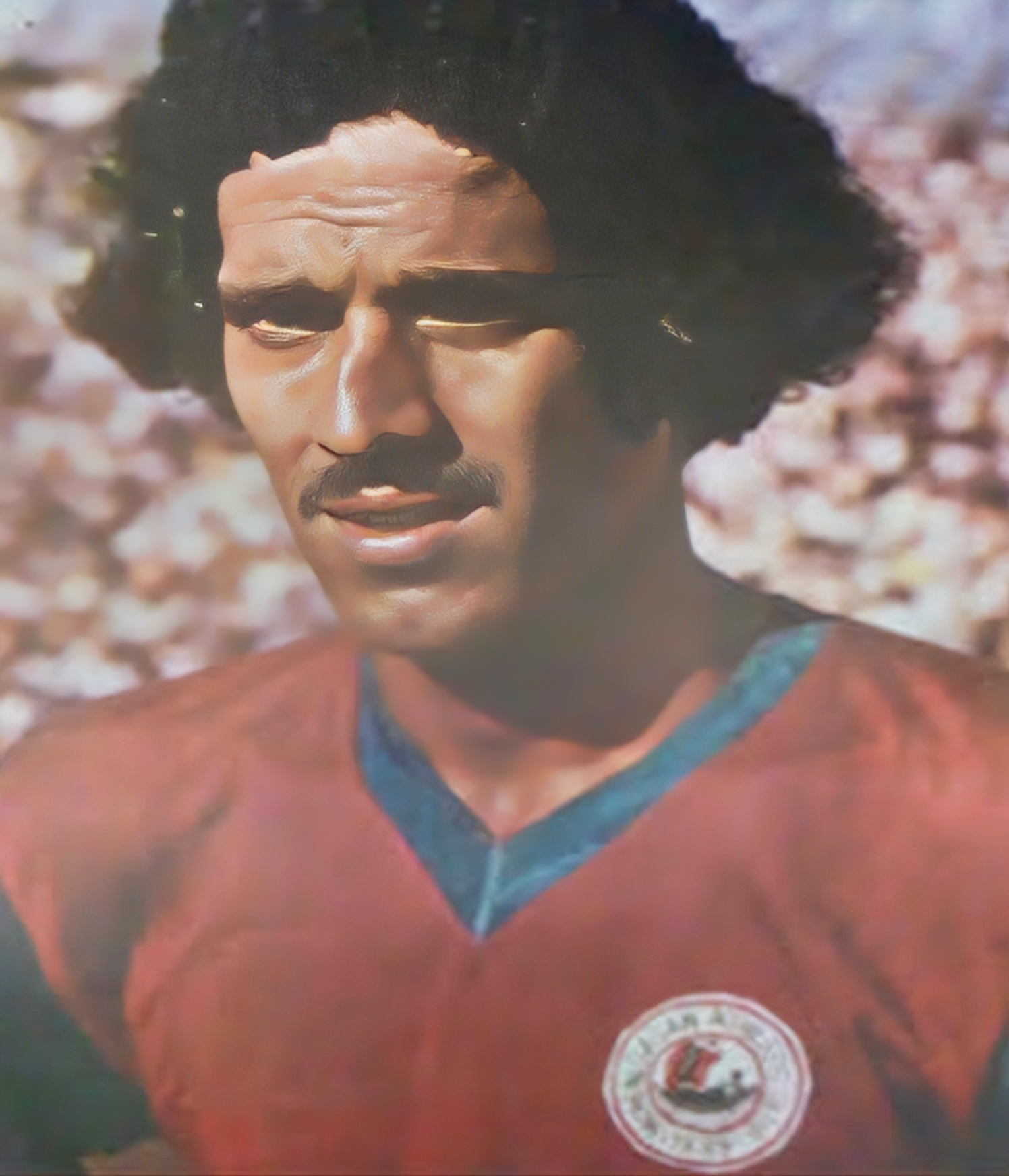
Former Mohunbagan (now known as Mohunbagan Super Giant) captain Subrata Bhattacharya appeared in 897 matches for the club overall, spanning 17 years. He won numerous trophies with the club during his tenure.

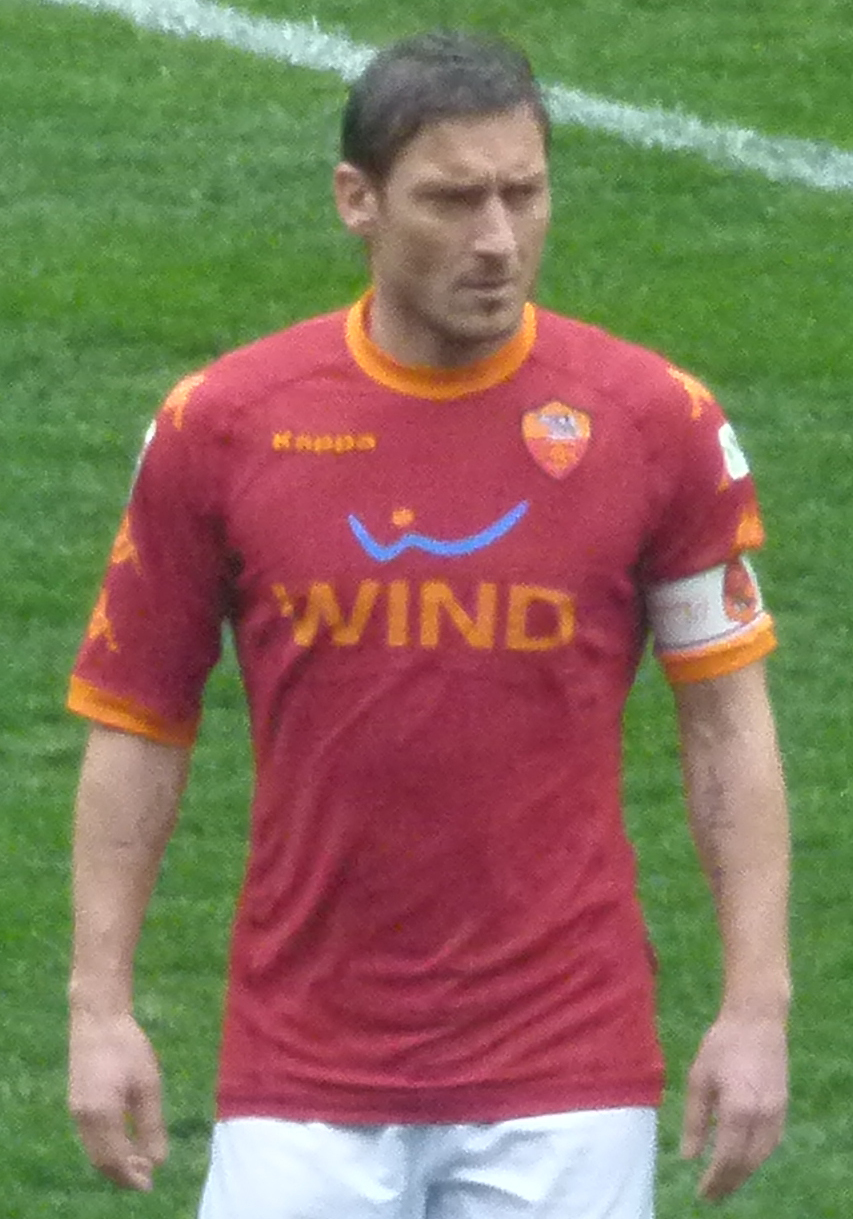
Former Roma captain Francesco Totti appeared in 786 matches for Roma over 25 seasons, scoring 307 goals. He is the second-highest scorer in Serie A history.

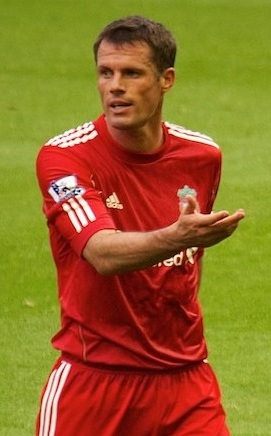
Former Liverpool vice-captain Jamie Carragher appeared in 737 matches over 16 seasons. He achieved 11 trophies with Liverpool.

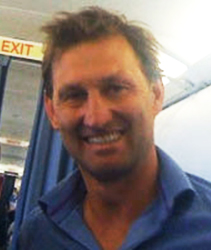
Former Arsenal captain Tony Adams appeared in 672 matches over 19 seasons. Adams won 13 major trophies over three different decades.

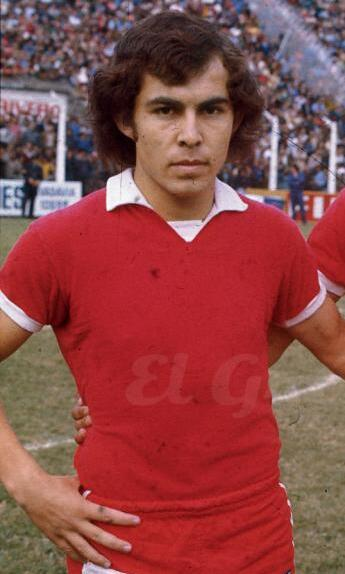
Club Atlético Independiente midfielder Ricardo Bochini appeared in more than 630 matches over 19 seasons. He won 14 trophies with the Avellaneda club, including five Copa Libertadores.

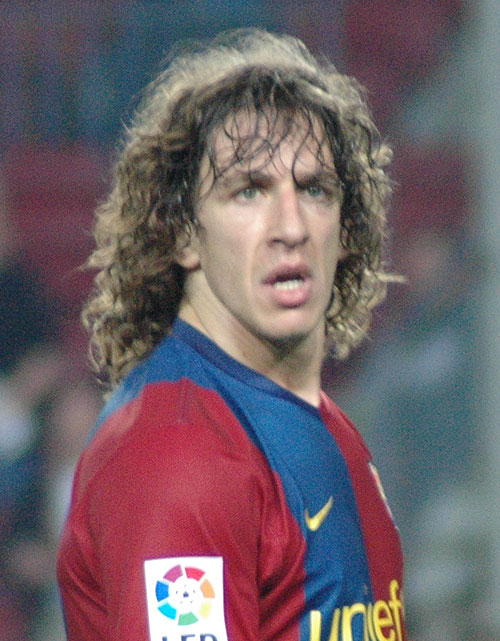
Former Barcelona captain Carles Puyol appeared in 593 matches over 15 seasons. Puyol won 21 trophies in the club, including the sextuple in 2009 while captain.

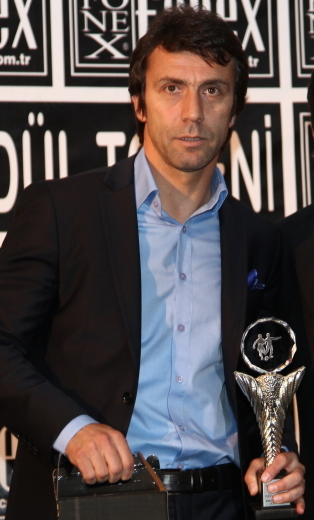
Former Galatasaray captain Bülent Korkmaz appeared in 592 matches over 18 seasons. Korkmaz won 29 trophies with the club, including a UEFA Cup and UEFA Super Cup.

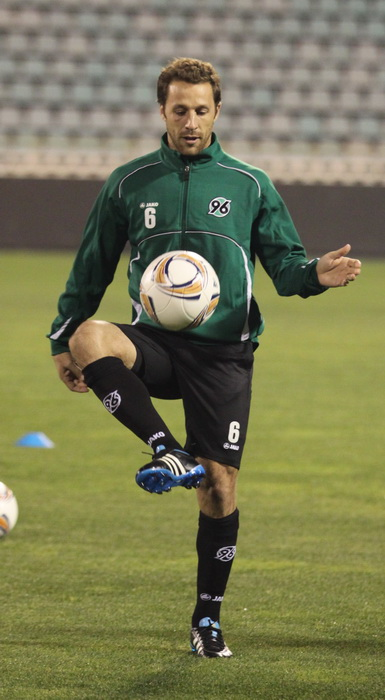
Hannover 96 defender Steve Cherundolo appeared in more than 400 matches over 16 seasons.

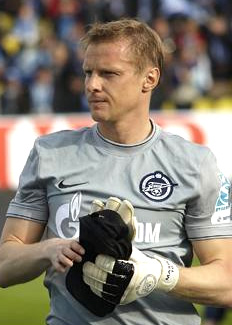
Zenit goalkeeper Vyacheslav Malafeev appeared in more than 400 matches over 17 seasons.

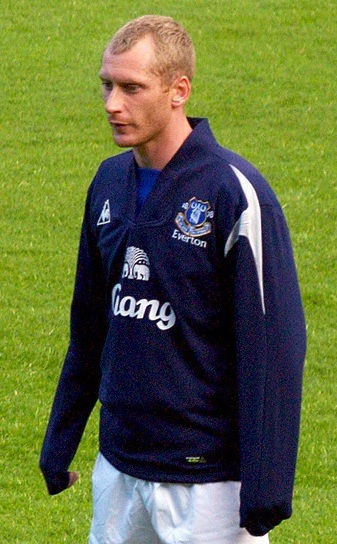
Everton defender Tony Hibbert appeared in 329 matches over 16 seasons.

Name	Nationality	Club	From	To	Span (years)	League appearances	Ref.
Vittorio Abbate	Italy	Malakoff	1966	1978	12		
Mohamed Abd Al-Jawad	Saudi Arabia	Al-Ahli	1980	1995	15		
Zouhair Abdallah	Lebanon	Shabab Sahel	2004	2023	19	160+	
Hossein Abdi	Iran	Persepolis	1987	2000	13		
Moustafa Abdou	Egypt	Al Ahly	1971	1987	16		
Basil Abdul Nabi	Kuwait	Al-Salmiya	1980	1997	17	378	
Majed Abdullah	Saudi Arabia	Al-Nassr	1977	1998	21	194	
Juan Carlos Ablanedo	Spain	Sporting Gijón	1982	1999	17	401	
Samir Aboud	Libya	Al-Ittihad	1991	2013	22	615	
Fritz Abromeit	West Germany	Rot-Weiss Essen	1946	1957	11	67	
Jamal Abu-Abed	Jordan	Al-Faisaly	1981	2000	19		
Domingo Acedo	Spain	Athletic Bilbao	1914	1929	15	0 (Note: Spanish league began in 1929)	
Adalberto	Portugal	Paços de Ferreira	1988	2005	17	380	
Tony Adams	England	Arsenal	1983	2002	19	504	
Jimmy Adamson	England	Burnley	1947	1964	17	426	
Adelino	Brazil	Cruzeiro	1943	1958	16	430	
Ermanno Aebi	Italy	Inter Milan	1910	1922	12	142	
Hamza Agrebi	Tunisia	Club Africain	2011	2024	14	185	
Gonzalo Aguilar	Uruguay	Racing	2006	2023	17	317	
Marhazif Ahad	Brunei	Wijaya	2004	2023	19		
Jakob Ahlmann	Denmark	AaB	2010	2024	15	299	
Fawaz Al-Ahmad	Kuwait	Kazma	1987	2005	17 (Note: The sport season in 1990–91 was not held in Kuwait due to the Gulf War)		
Charlie Aitken	Scotland	Motherwell	1950	1966	16	314	
Ilshat Aitkulov	Russia	Gazovik Orenburg	1990	2003	13	396	
Gürsel Aksel	Turkey	Göztepe	1959	1972	13	390	
Flórián Albert	Hungary	Ferencváros	1958	1974	16	339	
József Albert	Hungary	Szegedi AK	1930	1941	11		
Sjaak Alberts	Netherlands	Vitesse	1942	1953	11		
Carlo Albini	Italy	Brescia	1935	1949	14	327	
Francisco Albino	Portugal	Benfica	1932	1945	13	172	
Svend Albrechtsen	Denmark	Akademisk Boldklub	1935	1949	14		
Manuel Rodríguez Alfonso	Spain	Celta Vigo	1966	1982	16	432	
Ángel Allegri	Argentina	Vélez Sársfield	1946	1960	14	384	
Ole-Monrad Alme	Norway	Hødd	2014	2024	11	161	
Altair	Brazil	Fluminense	1955	1971	16	551	
Said Altınordu	Turkey	Altınordu	1929	1956	27		
Talal Al-Amer	Kuwait	Qadsia	2007	2018	11	147	
An Chol-hyok	North Korea	Rimyongsu	2003	2014	11		
Abdulaziz Al-Anberi	Kuwait	Kuwait	1971	1988	17		
Sante Ancherani	Italy	Lazio	1901	1912	11		
Andrew Anderson	Scotland	Heart of Midlothian	1929	1939	10	315	
Andy Anderson	Scotland	Partick Thistle	1971	1982	11	198	
Fredrik Andersson	Sweden	Halmstads BK	1988	2001	13	246	
Gillis Andersson	Sweden	Elfsborg	1932	1944	11	184	
Harry Andersson	Sweden	IK Sleipner	1932	1944	12		
Roy Andersson	Sweden	Malmö FF	1968	1983	15	327	
Thomas Andersson	Sweden	Örebro SK	1988	2006	18		
Tor Arne Andreassen	Norway	Haugesund	2003	2017	14	300	
Franco Andreoli	Switzerland	Lugano	1935	1947	12		
Nikolaos Angelakis	Greece	Aris	1924	1938	14		
Ângelo	Portugal	Benfica	1952	1965	13	231	
Michael Angerschmid	Austria	SV Ried	1992	2006	14	406	
John Angus	England	Burnley	1956	1972	16	439	
Teodor Anioła	Poland	Lech Poznań	1945	1961	16	196	
Toshihiro Aoyama	Japan	Sanfrecce Hiroshima	2004	2024	20 (Note: Had not played in the 2005 season.)	480	
Guido Ara	Italy	Pro Vercelli	1908	1921	13	163	
Patricio Arabolaza	Spain	Real Unión	1909	1923	14	0	
Mikel Aranburu	Spain	Real Sociedad	1997	2012	15	402	
Jesús Aranguren	Spain	Athletic Bilbao	1962	1975	13	247	
İsmail Arca	Turkey	Eskişehirspor	1965	1982	17	418	
Miguel Arcanjo	Portugal	Porto	1953	1966	13	228	
Luis Arconada	Spain	Real Sociedad	1974	1989	15	414	
Eneko Arieta	Spain	Athletic Bilbao	1951	1966	15	248	
Jimmy Armfield	England	Blackpool	1954	1971	17	569	
Juan Pedro Arremón	Uruguay	Peñarol	1916	1935	19		
Ali Artuner	Turkey	Göztepe	1961	1975	14	265	
Torbjörn Arvidsson	Sweden	Halmstads BK	1989	2005	16	306	
Ravil Aryapov	Soviet Union	Krylia Sovetov Kuybyshev	1967	1978	11	362	
José Antonio Arzac	Spain	Real Sociedad	1962	1975	13	295	
Satoru Asari	Japan	FC Tokyo	1997	2009	12	250	
Kakhi Asatiani	Soviet Union	Dinamo Tbilisi	1965	1975	10	218	
Ahmad Askar	Kuwait	Al-Arabi	1978	1994	15		
Burhan Atak	Turkey	Galatasaray	1920	1934	14		
Jarah Al Ateeqi	Kuwait	Kuwait	2000	2017	17		
Graham Atkinson	England	Oxford United	1962	1974	12	356	
Ron Atkinson	England	Oxford United (Note: Oxford United was named Headington United before 1960.)	1959	1971	12	560	
Roope Autio	Finland	JäPS	2010	2024	15	244+	
Klaus Augenthaler	Germany	Bayern Munich	1975	1991	16	404	
Mohammad Awad	Jordan	Al-Faisaly	1956	1972	16		
Fahad Awadh	Kuwait	Kuwait	2004	2017	13		
Eşfak Aykaç	Turkey	Galatasaray	1936	1946	10	131	
Iván Azócar	Chile	Rangers de Talca	1958	1976	18	386	
Itzik Azuz	Israel	Bnei Yehuda Tel Aviv	2003	2020	17	352	
Franck Azzopardi	France	Chamois Niortais	1989	2005	16	435	
Børge Bach	Denmark	AaB	1963	1977	14	348	
Joe Bacuzzi	England	Fulham	1935	1956	15 (Note: Excluding the six seasons suspended due to World War II. Bacuzzi made guest appearances for multiple clubs during that time.)	283	
Ruben Bagger	Denmark	Brøndby	1993	2007	14	243	
Jasem Bahman	Kuwait	Qadsia	1976	1986	10		
Noel Bailie	Northern Ireland	Linfield	1989	2011	22		
Colin Baker	Wales	Cardiff City	1953	1966	13	298	
Zuhair Bakheet	United Arab Emirates	Al Wasl	1986	2004	18		
Alain Balet	Switzerland	Sion	1975	1989	14	377	
Carlos Ballesta	Spain	Deportivo La Coruña	1974	1985	11	221	
Heiner Baltes	West Germany	Fortuna Düsseldorf	1970	1981	11	279	
Harry Bamford	England	Bristol Rovers	1945	1958	13	486	
Anatoliy Banishevskiy	Soviet Union	Neftchi Baku	1963	1978	15	288	
Haim Bar	Israel	Maccabi Netanya	1972	1989	17	497	
Ottavio Barbieri	Italy	Genoa	1919	1932	13	299	
Manuel Barbosa	Portugal	Boavista	1969	1983	14	345	
Philipp Bargfrede	Germany	Werder Bremen	2009	2021	12	207	
Franco Baresi	Italy	Milan	1977	1997	20	532	
Vladimir Barkaya	Soviet Union	Dinamo Tbilisi	1957	1967	10	226	
Pierre Barlaguet	France	Nîmes	1950	1964	14		
Jim Barrett	England	West Ham United	1924	1939	15	442	
Sam Bartram	England	Charlton Athletic	1934	1956	22	579	
Joachim Bäse	West Germany	Eintracht Braunschweig	1959	1973	14	347	
Suphi Batur	Turkey	Galatasaray	1916	1933	17		
Alaattin Baydar	Turkey	Fenerbahçe	1916	1931	15	324	
Giovanni Bazzano	Italy	Pro Vercelli	1908	1918	10		
Frank Beattie	Scotland	Kilmarnock	1954	1972	18	422	
Adolf Bechtold	Germany	Eintracht Frankfurt	1942	1963	21	397	
Eusebio Bejarano	Spain	Atletico Madrid	1968	1979	11	223	
Nihat Bekdik	Turkey	Galatasaray	1916	1936	20	268	
José María Belauste	Spain	Athletic Bilbao	1905	1926	21	0	
Harold Bell	England	Tranmere Rovers	1946	1960	14	633	
Gianpaolo Bellini	Italy	Atalanta	1998	2016	18	396	
Menachem Bello	Israel	Maccabi Tel Aviv	1963	1982	19	498	
Ljubo Benčić	Kingdom of Yugoslavia	Hajduk Split	1921	1935	14	353	
Bengala	Brazil	Cruzeiro	1925	1939	15	247	
Amado Benigno	Brazil	Flamengo	1923	1934	12		
Ib Bengtsson	Denmark	Frem	1945	1957	12	208	
Giuseppe Bergomi	Italy	Inter Milan	1979	1999	20	519	
Bengt Berndtsson	Sweden	IFK Göteborg	1951	1968	17	348	
Mario Berríos	Honduras	Marathón	2000	2017	17	474	
Jean-Paul Bertrand-Demanes	France	Nantes	1969	1987	18	532	
Olivier Besengez	Belgium	Mouscron	1990	2007	17	358	
Fikri Beşiroğlu	Turkey	Vefa	1962	1974	12	226	
Harry Betmead	England	Grimsby Town	1930	1947	17	296	
Subrata Bhattacharya	India	Mohun Bagan	1974	1990	16	489	
Edmund Białas	Poland	Lech Poznań	1934	1951	11 (Note: Excludes the 6 years during World War II 1939-1945 when all competitions were suspended)		
Alfred Bickel	Switzerland	Grasshoppers	1935	1956	21	405	
Carlo Bigatto	Italy	Juventus	1913	1931	18	232	
Angelo Binaschi	Italy	Pro Vercelli	1909	1921	12	113	
Franz Binder	Austria	Rapid Wien	1930	1949	19	242	
Ibrahim Biogradlić	Yugoslavia	Sarajevo	1951	1967	16	317	
Bekir Sıtkı Bircan	Turkey	Galatasaray	1905	1915	10		
Gyula Bíró	Hungary	MTK Budapest	1905	1916	11	135	
Joel Björkman	Sweden	GAIS	1909	1923	14		
Victor Björkman	Sweden	GAIS	1909	1919	10		
Pablo Blanco	Spain	Sevilla	1971	1984	13	415	
Henk Bloemers	Netherlands	Eindhoven	1964	1984	20	641	
Claudiu Boaru	Romania	Gaz Metan Mediaș	1998	2009	11	313	
Ricardo Bochini	Argentina	Independiente	1972	1991	19	740	
Marco Bode	Germany	Werder Bremen	1989	2002	13	379	
Lorenzo Valerio Bona	Italy	Juventus	1911	1921	10		
Jo Bonfrere	Netherlands	MVV Maastricht	1963	1985	22	335	
Giampiero Boniperti	Italy	Juventus	1946	1961	15	443	
Packie Bonner	Republic of Ireland	Celtic	1978	1997	19	642	
Fernand Boone	Belgium	Club Brugge	1955	1971	16	278	
Jan de Boer	Netherlands	Ajax	1920	1933	13	195	
Carlos Borja	Bolivia	Bolívar	1977	1997	20	532	
Sergei Borovsky	Soviet Union	Dinamo Minsk	1973	1987	14	400	
Espen Børufsen	Norway	Start	2006	2021	15	286	
Theo Bos	Netherlands	Vitesse	1983	1998	15	429	
Ahmet Börtücene	Turkey	Beşiktaş	1969	1979	10	176	
Ronnie Boyce	England	West Ham United	1959	1973	14	282	
Torben Boye	Denmark	AaB	1984	2002	18	560	
József Bozsik	Hungary	Honvéd	1943	1962	19	477	
Uwe Bracht	West Germany	Werder Bremen	1971	1984	13	309	
Arthur Bradford	England	Southampton	1922	1936	14	306	
Geoff Bradford	England	Bristol Rovers	1949	1964	15	462	
Renato Braglia	Italy	Modena	1939	1957	18		
Wolfgang Brase	West Germany	Eintracht Braunschweig	1958	1968	10	177	
Charles Cambier	Belgium	Club Brugge	1903	1925	22		
Gejus van der Meulen	Netherlands	HFC	1922	1935	13		
George Bray	England	Burnley	1937	1952	15	241	
Claude Brény	France	Sedan-Torcy	1953	1966	13	409	
Wim Tap	Netherlands	ADO Den Haag	1920	1936	16		
Briguel	Portugal	Marítimo	2000	2016	16	258	
Pietro Bronzini	Italy	Milan	1916	1926	10	139	
Frank Jacobsson	Sweden	GAIS	1949	1960	11	130	
George Brown	Scotland	Rangers	1929	1941	12	229	
Gadi Brumer	Israel	Maccabi Tel Aviv	1991	2004	13	316	
Thomas Brunner	Germany	1. FC Nürnberg	1982	1996	14	402	
Matthias Bruns	West Germany	Eintracht Braunschweig	1976	1986	10	201	
Ronnie Brunswijk	Suriname	Inter Moengotapoe	1987	2011	24		
Morten Bruun	Denmark	Silkeborg	1988	2001	13	424	
Ralf Bucher	Germany	SpVgg Unterhaching	1989	2009	20	292	
Abdulaziz Al-Buloushi	Kuwait	Qadsia	1980	1992	11		
Abdullah Al-Buloushi	Kuwait	Al-Arabi	1977	1989	12		
Mohammad Al-Buraiki	Kuwait	Al-Salmiya	1998	2008	10		
Wilhelm Burgsmüller	West Germany	Borussia Dortmund	1952	1966	14	241	
Steve Burtenshaw	England	Brighton & Hove Albion	1951	1967	16	237	
Sam Burton	England	Swindon Town	1945	1961	16	463	
Terry Bush	England	Bristol City	1960	1970	10	162	
Michael Buskermolen	Netherlands	AZ	1988	2006	18	399	
Gerry Byrne	England	Liverpool	1957	1969	12	274	
José María Busto	Spain	Sevilla	1942	1958	16	399	
Anatoliy Byshovets	Soviet Union	Dynamo Kyiv	1963	1973	10	139	
Rıza Çalımbay	Turkey	Beşiktaş	1980	1996	16	494	
Stewart Calderwood	Scotland	Partick Thistle	1926	1938	12	344	
Hector Goetinck	Belgium	Club Brugge	1903	1928	21 (Note: Goetinck did not played from 1914 to 1918 due to World War I.)		
Ernie Callaghan	England	Aston Villa	1932	1947	17	124	
Patrick Callaghan	Scotland	Hibernian	1898	1914	16	311	
Ignacio Calle	Colombia	Atlético Nacional	1951	1965	14	346	
Gustaf Bergström	Sweden	Örgryte	1899	1910	11		
Hernando Tovar	Colombia	Independiente Santa Fe	1954	1965	11	204	
William Morales	Colombia	Independiente Santa Fe	1981	1994	13		
Paco Camarasa	Spain	Valencia	1987	2000	13	267	
Cao Yang	China	Tianjin Jinmen Tiger	2000	2019	19	387	
Charles Campbell	Scotland	Queen's Park	1870	1886	16		
Jackie Campbell	Scotland	Partick Thistle	1963	1982	19	406	
Piero Campelli	Italy	Inter Milan	1910	1925	15	179	
Carlos Campos	Chile	Universidad de Chile	1956	1969	13	259	
Fernand Canelle	France	Club Français	1896	1914	18		
Louis Mesnier	France	CA Paris	1904	1920	16		
Robert De Veen	Belgium	Club Brugge	1904	1914	10		
Carlinhos	Brazil	Flamengo	1958	1969	11		
Joseph Caruana	Malta	Rabat Ajax	2003	2023	20	424	
Raymond Dubly	France	RC Roubaix	1911	1931	20		
Roger Rio	France	Rouen	1931	1951	20		
Georges Garnier	France	Club Français	1896	1906	10		
Erik Bergström	Sweden	Örgryte	1902	1914	12		
Jean Nicolas	France	Rouen	1929	1939	10		
Jules Mathé	France	RC Paris	1934	1948	14		
Carlitos	Brazil	Internacional	1938	1951	13		
Jerry Carlsson	Sweden	IFK Göteborg	1974	1987	13	247	
Jack Carr	England	Newcastle United	1899	1912	13	279	
Jamie Carragher	England	Liverpool	1996	2013	17	508	
José Luis Carranza	Peru	Universitario de Deportes	1985	2004	19	570	
Constantin Cârstea	Romania	Argeș Pitești	1970	1982	12	244	
Paco Castellano	Spain	Las Palmas	1964	1978	14	371	
Javier Castañeda	Spain	Osasuna	1980	1991	11	350	
Armando Castellazzi	Italy	Inter Milan	1923	1936	13	246	
Jesús Castro	Spain	Sporting Gijón	1968	1985	17	417	
Ross Caven	Scotland	Queen's Park	1982	2002	20	532	
José María Ceballos	Spain	Racing Santander	1988	2003	15	426	
Giampiero Ceccarelli	Italy	Cesena	1966	1985	19		
Massimo Ceccaroni	Switzerland	Basel	1987	2002	15	398	
René Cédolin	France	Rennes	1959	1972	13	367	
Cesarino Cervellati	Italy	Bologna	1948	1962	14	300	
Antonio Cetti	Italy	Como	1920	1941	21	278	
Oskar Bengtsson	Sweden	Örgryte	1902	1914	12		
Cai Huikang	China	Shanghai Port	2006	2024	19	364+	
Zacharias Chaliabalias	Greece	Iraklis	1964	1975	11	280	
Chan Yuk Chi	Hong Kong	Tai Po	2002	2017	15	168	
John Charles	England	Blackpool	1912	1924	12	228	
Jack Charlton	England	Leeds United	1952	1973	21	629	
Ton du Chatinier	Netherlands	Utrecht	1977	1987	10	235	
Vakhtang Chelidze	Soviet Union	Dinamo Tbilisi	1965	1976	11	247	
Chendo	Spain	Real Madrid	1982	1998	16	363	
Steve Cherundolo	United States	Hannover 96	1999	2014	15	370	
Volodymyr Chesnakov	Ukraine	Vorskla Poltava	2007	2024	17	353	
Chiu Yu-hung	Taiwan	Taipower	2013	2024	12		
Aleksandr Chivadze	Soviet Union	Dinamo Tbilisi	1974	1987	13	324	
Joris Chougrani	France	Rodez	2010	2025	14 (Note: Had only played for reserves in the 2012–13 season.)	262	
Stanisław Cikowski	Poland	Cracovia	1912	1925	13		
Choi Jin-cheul	South Korea	Jeonbuk Hyundai Motors	1996	2007	12	240	
Chung Yong-hwan	South Korea	Daewoo Royals	1984	1994	11	150	
Charlie Church	Scotland	Queen's Park	1948	1961	13	210	
Necdet Cici	Turkey	Galatasaray	1928	1941	13	126	
Gerard Cieślik	Poland	Ruch Chorzów	1948	1959	11	237	
José Claramunt	Spain	Valencia	1966	1978	12	324	
Ronnie Clayton	England	Blackburn Rovers	1951	1969	18	581	
Ivo Cocconi	Italy	Parma	1948	1962	14	308	
Teofil Codreanu	Romania	Rapid București	1961	1973	12	258	
George Cohen	England	Fulham	1956	1969	13	459	
Hervé Collot	France	Nancy	1952	1964	12	275	
Gianpiero Combi	Italy	Juventus	1923	1934	11	367	
Ian Cooke	England	Wimbledon	1963	1977	14	427	
Willie Cooper	Scotland	Aberdeen	1928	1948	20	347	
Victor Carlund	Sweden	Örgryte	1928	1939	11	165	
Ken Coote	England	Brentford	1949	1964	15	559	
Mario Cordero	Costa Rica	Deportivo Saprissa	1949	1964	15	458	
Víctor Cordero	Costa Rica	Deportivo Saprissa	1991	2011	20	458	
Evaristo Coronado	Costa Rica	Deportivo Saprissa	1981	1995	14	537	
Anthony Correia	Netherlands	Telstar	2001	2016	15	354	
Jesús Diego Cota	Spain	Rayo Vallecano	1987	2002	15	401	
Pat Courtney	Republic of Ireland	Shamrock Rovers	1960	1971	11		
Colin Cowperthwaite	England	Barrow	1977	1992	15	704	
Bobby Cox	Scotland	Dundee	1956	1968	12	327	
James Crawford	Scotland	Queen's Park	1922	1937	15	449	
Otto Andersson	Sweden	Örgryte	1930	1940	10	188	
Bob Crompton	England	Blackburn Rovers	1896	1920	24	530	
Jürgen Croy	East Germany	FSV Zwickau	1965	1982	17	372	
Luis Carlos Cuartero	Spain	Zaragoza	1995	2009	14	190	
Stan Cullis	England	Wolves	1934	1947	13	155	
Bernhard Cullmann	West Germany	1. FC Köln	1970	1984	14	341	
Carsten Cullmann	Germany	1. FC Köln	1998	2010	12	192	
John Cumming	Scotland	Hearts	1950	1967	17	359	
Horácio da Costa	Brazil	Fluminense	1902	1911	10		
Faisal Al-Dakhil	Kuwait	Qadsia	1973	1989	16		
Jenő Dalnoki	Hungary	Ferencváros	1950	1966	16		
Gidi Damti	Israel	Shimshon Tel Aviv	1968	1989	21	544	
Romain Danzé	France	Rennes	2006	2018	12	323	
Primo Danieli	Italy	Padova	1919	1931	12		
Kim Daugaard	Denmark	Brøndby	1992	2008	16	336	
Nir Davidovich	Israel	Maccabi Haifa	1994	2013	19	385	
Mike Davies	England	Blackpool	1984	1995	11	310	
Taffy Davies	Wales	Watford	1930	1950	20	284	
Abdulrahman Al-Dawla	Kuwait	Al-Arabi	1961	1975	14		
Jerry Dawson	England	Burnley	1907	1928	21	522	
Gino De Biasi	Italy	Treviso	1924	1941	17		
Ygnve Källqvist	Sweden	Örgryte	1971	1981	10		
Ettore De Michele	Italy	Lecce	1908	1918	10		
Giovanni De Prà	Italy	Genoa	1919	1933	14	304	
Klaus Decker	East Germany	1. FC Magdeburg	1970	1983	13	278	
Yuriy Dehteryov	Soviet Union	Shakhtar Donetsk	1967	1988	21	321	
Michalis Delavinias	Greece	AEK Athens	1938	1955	17	14	
Giovanni Delfino	Italy	Sampdoria	1958	1970	12		
Giuseppe Della Valle	Italy	Bologna	1916	1931	15		
Serge Delmas	France	Montpellier	1965	1977	12		
Stefan Dembicki	France	Lens	1936	1949	13	181+	
Raynald Denoueix	France	Nantes	1966	1979	13		
Rahmi Denizöz	Turkey	Vefa	1947	1962	15	262	
Halit Deringör	Turkey	Fenerbahçe	1942	1952	10	193	
Dinko Dermendzhiev	Bulgaria	Botev Plovdiv	1959	1978	19	447	
Anthony Deroin	France	Caen	1997	2012	15	374	
Benito Díaz	Spain	Real Sociedad	1917	1927	10	0	
Zenón Díaz	Argentina	Rosario Central	1903	1919	16	175	
Jimmy Dickinson	England	Portsmouth	1946	1965	19	764	
Johnny Dixon	England	Aston Villa	1945	1961	16	423	
Bonaventure Djonkep	Cameroon	Union Douala	1982	1995	13		
Yousef Al-Dokhi	Kuwait	Kazma	1989	2001	11		
René Domingo	France	Saint-Étienne	1949	1964	15	456	
Plamen Donev	Bulgaria	Svetkavitsa	1973	1992	19	355	
Hans-Jürgen Dörner	East Germany	Dynamo Dresden	1968	1985	17	400	
Hans Dörre	West Germany	Rot-Weiss Essen	1965	1978	13	256	
Bryan Douglas	England	Blackburn Rovers	1952	1969	17	438	
Mircea Dridea	Romania	Petrolul Ploiești	1956	1971	15	282	
Carlos Duarte	Portugal	Porto	1952	1962	10	172	
Peter Ducke	East Germany	Carl Zeiss Jena	1959	1977	18	352	
Dick Duckworth	England	Manchester United	1903	1914	11	225	
Bernd Dürnberger	West Germany	Bayern Munich	1972	1985	13	375	
Bill Eckersley	England	Blackburn Rovers	1947	1961	14	403	
Bryan Edwards	England	Bolton Wanderers	1947	1965	18	483	
Hans-Walter Eigenbrodt	West Germany	Eintracht Frankfurt	1955	1965	10	94	
Dieter Eilts	Germany	Werder Bremen	1985	2002	17	390	
Guillermo Eizaguirre	Spain	Sevilla	1924	1936	12	130	
Mahmoud El Khatib	Egypt	Al Ahly	1972	1988	16	199	
Walid Mhadeb El Khatroushi	Libya	Al-Ittihad	2005	2016	11		
Alex Elliott	Scotland	Partick Thistle	1927	1939	12	369	
Ayfer Elmastaşoğlu	Turkey	Altay SK	1961	1976	15	324	
John Elsworthy	Wales	Ipswich Town	1949	1965	16	396	
Hamada Emam	Egypt	Zamalek	1957	1974	17	267	
Arvid Emanuelsson	Sweden	Elfsborg	1933	1947	14		
Antonio Emery	Spain	Real Unión	1923	1935	12	110	
Jargalsaikhany Enkhbayar	Mongolia	Khangarid	1997	2021	24		
Necmi Erdoğdu	Turkey	Galatasaray	1944	1955	11		
Georg Ericson	Sweden	IFK Norrköping	1938	1958	20		
Andrias Eriksen	Faroe Islands	B36 Tórshavn	2014	2024	11	28	
Ivar Eriksson	Sweden	Sandvikens IF	1933	1944	11		
Mithat Ertuğ	Turkey	Galatasaray	1923	1933	10		
Rober Eryol	Turkey	Galatasaray	1947	1959	12	79	
Jürgen Escher	East Germany	Wismut Aue	1971	1986	15	310	
Adrián Escudero	Spain	Atlético Madrid	1945	1958	13	287	
Sven Espling	Sweden	Helsingborg	1949	1963	14	469	
Jean-Luc Ettori	France	Monaco	1977	1994	17	602	
Patrick Fabian	Germany	VfL Bochum	2005	2020	15	148	
Giacinto Facchetti	Italy	Inter Milan	1960	1978	18	476	
Giuseppe Facoetti	Italy	Atalanta	1919	1930	11		
Tom Farquharson	Ireland	Cardiff City	1922	1935	13	445	
Kemal Faruki	Turkey	Galatasaray	1923	1934	11		
Antonio Fayenz	Italy	Padova	1919	1929	10		
Andrei Fedyakin	Russia	Luch Vladivostok	1981	1996	15	447	
Vladimir Fedotov	Soviet Union	CSKA Moscow	1960	1975	15	382	
Fredric Fendrich	Sweden	Jönköpings Södra IF	2004	2022	18	372	
Feng Junyan	China	Guangzhou	2003	2014	11	222	
Sharif El-Far	Egypt	Zamalek	1948	1961	13		
Micky Fenton	England	Middlesbrough	1933	1950	17	240	
Teodoro Fernández	Peru	Universitario de Deportes	1931	1953	22		
Thomas Ferguson	Scotland	Falkirk	1919	1932	13	451	
Hassan El-Far	Egypt	Zamalek	1930	1947	17		
Bob Ferrier	England	Motherwell	1917	1937	20	626	
Christian Fiedler	Germany	Hertha BSC	1993	2009	16	234	
Olle Åhlund	Sweden	Degerfors IF	1939	1953	14		
Andrei Finonchenko	Kazakhstan	Shakhter Karagandy	2001	2016	15	329	
Dino Fiorini	Italy	Bologna	1932	1943	11		
Waldemar Fiúme	Brazil	Palmeiras	1941	1958	18	620	
Waldemar Fornalik	Poland	Ruch Chorzów	1982	1994	12	233	
Willy Fossli	Norway	Asker	1948	1965	17		
Jörg Sievers	Germany	Hannover 96	1989	2003	14		
Bill Foulkes	England	Manchester United	1952	1969	17	566	
Ignacio Flores	Mexico	Cruz Azul	1972	1990	18	389	
Fran	Spain	Deportivo La Coruña	1988	2005	17	550	
Juan Carlos Franco	Paraguay	Olimpia Asunción	1992	2005	13		
Gerhard Franke	East Germany	Turbine Erfurt	1950	1968	18		
Horst Franke	East Germany	Aktivist Brieske-Senftenberg (Note: The club was named BSG Aktivist Ost Brieske in 1950 and became part of the DDR-Oberliga. Then the football section was delegated to the newly founded SC Aktivist Brieske-Senftenberg between 1954 and 1963. After SC Aktivist was relegated from the DDR-Oberliga in 1963, the entire first team was delegated to SC Cottbus, a predecessor of Energie Cottbus. The second team rejoined the BSG Aktivist Brieske-Ost which, after merging with the BSG Aktivist Senftenberg, competed as BSG Aktivist Brieske-Senftenberg from February 1972. Horst Franke played with the second team in 1964 and in 1965 in DDR-Liga, thus is considered to play at the same club.)	1949	1965	16		
Henning Frenzel	East Germany	Lokomotive Leipzig	1960	1978	18	421 (Note: He played once in 2004 in a Kreisliga-3 (tier 11) match against SV Paunsdorf.)	
Redfern Froggatt	England	Sheffield Wednesday	1945	1960	15	498	
Henry From	Denmark	AGF	1948	1961	13	277	
Kota Fujimoto	Japan	Cerezo Osaka	2005	2019	14	226	
Masahiro Fukuda	Japan	Urawa Red Diamonds	1989	2002	13	287	
Agustín Gaínza	Spain	Athletic Bilbao	1940	1959	19	381	
Agustín Gajate	Spain	Real Sociedad	1978	1992	14	364	
Antoni Gałecki	Poland	ŁKS Łódź	1922	1939	17	204	
Manuel Gama	Portugal	Anadia	2009	2023	16	244	
Francisco Gamborena	Spain	Real Unión	1915	1934	19	92	
Giuseppe Gandini	Italy	Alessandria	1921	1932	11		
Gao Yao	China	Shandong Taishan	1998	2009	11	150	
Jorge García	Spain	Deportivo La Coruña	1975	1991	16	254	
José Ignacio Garmendia	Spain	Eibar	1979	1998	19	388	
Felice Gasperi	Italy	Bologna	1924	1938	14		
Alberto Gatto	Italy	Reggina	1953	1966	13		
Boris Gavrilov	Soviet Union	Shinnik Yaroslavl	1971	1989	18	575	
Gaztelu	Spain	Real Sociedad	1967	1981	14	308	
Chic Geatons	Scotland	Celtic	1929	1940	11	280	
Peter Giessner	East Germany	Lokomotive Leipzig	1960	1975	15	343	
Tommy Gemmell	Scotland	St Mirren	1951	1962	11	264	
Pietro Genovesi	Italy	Bologna	1919	1933	14		
Billy George	England	Aston Villa	1897	1911	14	356	
Cornel Georgescu	Romania	Bihor Oradea	1974	1989	15	347	
Traian Georgescu	Romania	Universitatea Cluj	1951	1967	16	303	
Sabri Gençsoy	Turkey	Beşiktaş	1938	1948	10	137	
Leopold Gernhardt	Austria	Rapid Wien	1939	1955	16	208	
Vasco Gervásio	Portugal	Académica de Coimbra	1962	1979	17	355	
Viktor Getmanov	Soviet Union	SKA Rostov	1962	1972	10	232	
Karl Koller	Austria	First Vienna	1949	1966	17		
Hatem Ghaeb	Syria	Al-Shorta	1987	2000	13		
Nassir Al-Ghanem	Kuwait	Kuwait	1978	1992	13		
Abdulsalam Al Ghurbani	Yemen	Al-Sha'ab Ibb	1990	2007	17		
Nigel Gibbs	England	Watford	1983	2002	19	407	
Ryan Giggs	Wales	Manchester United	1990	2014	24	672	
Bob Gillespie	Scotland	Queen's Park	1919	1933	14	428	
Roberto Gil	Spain	Valencia	1959	1971	12		
Abba Gindin	Israel	Hapoel Haifa	1964	1976	12		
Ludwik Gintel	Poland	Cracovia Krakow	1916	1930	14		
Frédéric Gioria	France	Nice	1988	2000	12	216	
Józef Gładysz	Poland	Lechia Gdańsk	1970	1982	12	221	
Alois Glaubitz	East Germany	FSV Zwickau	1954	1973	19	429	
Archie Glen	Scotland	Aberdeen	1948	1960	12	203	
Jakob Glerup	Denmark	Viborg	1994	2010	16	454	
Johannes Demantke	Austria	Admira Wacker	1967	1983	16	412	
Tommy Glidden	England	West Bromwich Albion	1922	1936	14	445	
Go Yo-han	South Korea	FC Seoul	2006	2023	18	353	
Vladimir Golubev	Soviet Union	Zenit Leningrad	1968	1981	13	335	
Zeki Gökbora	Turkey	Vefa	1942	1952	10	122	
Kadri Göktulga	Turkey	Fenerbahçe	1921	1931	10		
Oswaldo Gomes	Brazil	Fluminense	1906	1921	16		
Jonathan Goncalves	France	Annecy	2011	2023	13	147	
Néstor Gonçalves	Uruguay	Peñarol	1956	1970	14	574	
Şeref Görkey	Turkey	Beşiktaş	1930	1950	20	295	
Silvester Goraseb	Namibia	Black Africa	1992	2009	17		
Valeri Gorbunov	Soviet Union	Shakhtar Donetsk	1972	1982	10	222	
Alberto Górriz	Spain	Real Sociedad	1979	1993	14	461	
Sylvain Hanquez	France	Abbeville	1979	1994	15		
Chuni Goswami	India	Mohun Bagan	1954	1968	14		
Giannis Goumas	Greece	Panathinaikos	1994	2009	15	286	
Jürgen Grabowski	West Germany	Eintracht Frankfurt	1965	1980	15	441	
Johnny Graham	Scotland	Dumbarton	1967	1977	10	286	
Karl-Erik Grahn	Sweden	Elfsborg	1932	1949	17	346	
Hans-Ulrich Grapenthin	East Germany	Carl Zeiss Jena	1966	1985	19	308	
Dougie Gray	Scotland	Rangers	1925	1947	22	490	
Eddie Gray	Scotland	Leeds United	1965	1983	18	454	
Fred Gregory	England	Watford	1911	1926	15	311	
John Greig	Scotland	Rangers	1961	1978	17	498	
Octavian Grigore	Romania	Petrolul Ploiești	1981	2000	19	519	
Jürgen Gronau	Germany	FC St. Pauli	1984	1997	13	318	
Wolfgang Grzyb	West Germany	Eintracht Braunschweig	1965	1978	13	305	
Julen Guerrero	Spain	Athletic Bilbao	1992	2006	14	372	
Muharrem Gülergin	Turkey	Adana Demirspor	1940	1957	17		
Orri Gunnarsson	Iceland	Fram	2011	2022	12	153	
Bobby Gurney	England	Sunderland	1926	1939	13	388	
Carlos Gurpegui	Spain	Athletic Bilbao	2002	2016	14	313	
Carlos Gustafsson	Sweden	Örebro SK	1974	1985	11	228	
Henrik Gustavsson	Sweden	Åtvidaberg	1997	2019	21 (Note: Henrik Gustavsson played from 1997 to 2015. During the summer of 2016, Gustavsson returned to Åtvidaberg playing a match in September 2016. On 6 June 2018, he again made a comeback in Åtvidaberg.)	528	
Vladimir Gutsaev	Soviet Union	Dinamo Tbilisi	1971	1986	15	303	
Nevzat Güzelırmak	Turkey	Göztepe	1958	1975	17	414	
László Gyetvai	Hungary	Ferencváros	1937	1948	11	161	
Ghanem Haddaf	Qatar	Al-Sailiya	2010	2024	14	84+	
Galip Haktanır	Turkey	Vefa	1942	1955	13	207	
Grenville Hair	England	Leeds United	1948	1964	16	443	
Mohammed Hajeyah	Kuwait	Qadsia	1980	1995	14		
Asghar Hajiloo	Iran	Esteghlal	1976	1988	12		
Hussain Hakem	Kuwait	Kuwait	2004	2022	18		
Klaus Hänel	Germany	Werder Bremen	1956	1968	12	215	
Jim Hammond	England	Fulham	1928	1939	11	342	
John Hansen	Scotland	Partick Thistle	1967	1978	11	213	
Holger Hansson	Sweden	IFK Göteborg	1946	1960	14	254	
Alan Harrington	Wales	Cardiff City	1952	1966	14	348	
Peter Harris	England	Portsmouth	1946	1960	14	479	
Les Hart	England	Bury	1936	1963	17	280	
Sami Al-Hashash	Kuwait	Al-Arabi	1977	1993	15		
Naoki Hatta	Japan	Júbilo Iwata	2008	2023	15	173	
Lothar Hause	East Germany	1. FC Frankfurt	1973	1992	19	346	
René Hauss	France	Strasbourg	1949	1968	19	544	
Fred Hawkes	England	Luton Town	1899	1920	21	509	
René Deutschmann	France	Strasbourg	1969	1985	16	352	
Robert Hawkes	England	Luton Town	1900	1920	20	349	
Jack Hather	England	Aberdeen	1948	1960	12	264	
Juan Enrique Hayes	Argentina	Rosario Central	1906	1926	20	206	
Johnny Hayward	England	Yeovil Town	1906	1928	22		
Puck van Heel	Netherlands	Feyenoord	1923	1940	17	322	
Werner Heilig	Germany	Eintracht Frankfurt	1939	1957	18	355	
Heitor	Brazil	Palmeiras	1916	1931	16	357	
Marinó Axel Helgason	Iceland	Grindavík	2014	2024	11	127	
Eric Hellemons	Netherlands	RBC	1988	2005	17	358	
Mikael Hellström	Sweden	Hammarby IF	1990	2005	15	301	
Geir Henæs	Norway	Moss	1977	1988	11		
Ron Henry	England	Tottenham Hotspur	1952	1966	14	247	
Peter Henschel	East Germany	FSV Zwickau	1961	1976	15	307	
Robert Herbin	France	Saint-Étienne	1957	1975	16	413	
Leonel Hernández	Costa Rica	Cartaginés	1962	1977	15	360	
Harry Dénis	Netherlands	HBS Craeyenhout	1911	1934	13	298	
Abel Ernesto Herrera	Argentina	Estudiantes La Plata	1972	1988	16	467	
Heinz Herrmann	East Germany	BSG Chemie Leipzig	1956	1974	18	294	
Kees Pijl	Netherlands	Feyenoord	1921	1931	10	203	
Patrick Herrmann	Germany	Borussia Mönchengladbach	2010	2024	14	351	
Jürgen Heun	Germany	FC Rot-Weiß Erfurt	1976	1993	17	370	
Georges Heylens	Belgium	Anderlecht	1960	1973	13	452	
Tony Hibbert	England	Everton	2000	2016	16	264	
Dadang Hidayat	Indonesia	Persib Bandung	1993	2005	12	333	
Philippe Hinschberger	France	Metz	1978	1992	14	482	
Michel Heinrich	France	Metz	1958	1970	12		
Fritjof Hillén	Sweden	GAIS	1910	1927	17		
Tadaaki Hirakawa	Japan	Urawa Red Diamonds	2002	2018	16	336	
Günter Hirschmann	East Germany	1. FC Magdeburg	1955	1969	14	330	
Christian Hochstätter	Germany	Borussia Mönchengladbach	1982	1998	16	339	
Alan Hodgkinson	England	Sheffield United	1954	1971	17	576	
Hermann Höfer	West Germany	Eintracht Frankfurt	1953	1967	14	292	
Martin Hoffmann	East Germany	1. FC Magdeburg	1972	1985	13	256	
Wilhelm Hoffmeyer	East Germany	Turbine Erfurt	1949	1959	10	270	
Joe Hogan	Scotland	Partick Thistle	1955	1967	12	199	
Carl-Erik Holmberg	Sweden	Örgryte	1924	1939	15	260	
Nick Holmes	England	Southampton	1972	1987	15	444	
Andreas Hopmark	Norway	Kristiansund	2010	2024	14 (Note: Had not played in the 2011 season.)	284	
Tor Egil Horn	Norway	Bodø/Glimt	1996	2007	11		
Lars Høgh	Denmark	OB	1977	2000	23	603	
Andrew Hosie	Scotland	Queen's Park	1928	1939	11	174	
Saad Al-Houti	Kuwait	Kuwait	1970	1984	14		
Choirul Huda	Indonesia	Persela Lamongan	1999	2017	18	503	
Frank Hudspeth	England	Newcastle United	1910	1929	19	472	
Nawaf Al Humaidan	Kuwait	Kazma	1999	2014	15		
Eddie Hunter	Scotland	Queen's Park	1964	1974	10	199	
Osama Hussain	Kuwait	Al-Arabi	1987	2002	14		
Ayman Al-Hussaini	Kuwait	Kazma	1985	2000	14		
Khaled Hussein	Libya	Al-Nasr	1996	2012	16		
Hwang Ji-soo	South Korea	Pohang Steelers	2004	2017	12	270	
Heorhiy Iakovyshyn	Soviet Union	Avanhard Rovno	1973	1985	12	371	
Enver Ibërshimi	Albania	Labinoti Elbasan	1960	1973	13		
Saim İdemen	Turkey	Vefa	1929	1944	15	99	
Mönkhtogtokhyn Idersaikhan	Mongolia	Khangarid	2002	2018	16		
Celal İbrahim	Turkey	Galatasaray	1905	1915	10		
Spyros Ikonomopoulos	Greece	AEK Athens	1977	1996	19	95	
Henk Vermetten	Netherlands	HBS Craeyenhout	1921	1935	14	268	
Rudolf Illovszky	Hungary	Vasas	1941	1956	15	270	
Anatoli Ilyin	Soviet Union	Spartak Moscow	1949	1962	13	224	
Yiannos Ioannou	Cyprus	APOEL	1981	2000	19	371	
Konstantinos Iosifidis	Greece	PAOK	1971	1985	14	397	
Cecil Irwin	England	Sunderland A.F.C.	1958	1971	13	313	
Katsuya Ishihara	Japan	Ventforet Kofu	2001	2017	16	467	
Petre Ivan	Romania	Argeș Pitești	1968	1980	12	335	
Branko Ivanković	Yugoslavia	Varteks	1979	1990	11	263	
Aleksandr Ivanov	Soviet Union	Zenit Leningrad	1950	1960	10	220	
Valentin Ivanov	Soviet Union	Torpedo Moscow	1952	1966	14	286	
Fathi Jabir	Yemen	Al-Tilal	1998	2010	12		
Kenny Jackett	Wales	Watford	1980	1990	10	337	
Per Jacobsen	Norway	Odds	1945	1965	20		
Sven Jacobsson	Sweden	GAIS	1934	1951	17	280	
Kamil Jadach	Poland	GKS Jastrzębie	2009	2024	15	393	
Joseph Jadrejak	France	Lille	1939	1950	11 (Note: He played for SC Fives between 1939 and 1944, year when the club merged with Olympique Lillois to form Lille OSC.)		
Adolf Jäger	Germany	Altona 93	1907	1927	20		
Róaldur Jakobsen	Faroe Islands	B36 Tórshavn	2008	2018	11	266	
Glyn James	Wales	Blackpool	1960	1975	15	399	
Tony Jantschke	Germany	Borussia Mönchengladbach	2008	2024	16	247	
Waleed Al-Jasem	Kuwait	Kuwait	1977	1990	13		
Ahmed Jassem	Kuwait	Al-Arabi	1992	2006	14		
Aage Rou Jensen	Denmark	AGF	1941	1962	21	410	
Bjarne Jensen	Denmark	Brøndby	1976	1992	16	556	
Jan Jerabek	Czech Republic	Pardubice	2006	2023	17		
Jan Jeuring	Netherlands	Twente	1966	1977	11	326	
Živorad Jevtić	Yugoslavia	Red Star Belgrade	1963	1975	12	157	
Joaquín	Spain	Sporting Gijón	1977	1992	15	514	
Werner Jochmann	East Germany	SC Einheit Dresden	1949	1963	14		
Søren Jochumsen	Denmark	Horsens	1994	2012	18	521	
Kaj Leo Johannesen	Faroe Islands	Havnar Bóltfelag	1984	2004	17 (Note: Had only played for reserves between 2000 and 2003.)	221	
Egon Johansen	Denmark	AaB	1936	1953	17	252	
Åke Johansson	Sweden	IFK Norrköping	1948	1966	18	321	
Gustav Johansson	Sweden	GAIS	1911	1922	11		
Ken Johnson	England	Hartlepool	1949	1964	15	384	
Marvin Johnson	England	Luton Town	1987	2002	15	373	
Carl Jonsson	Sweden	GAIS	1929	1940	11		
Harry Johnston	England	Blackpool	1934	1955	21	398	
Sven Jonasson	Sweden	Elfsborg	1927	1946	19	409	
Alfred Jones	England	Wrexham	1923	1935	12	503	
T.E. Jones	England	Everton	1948	1961	13	383	
Egon Jönsson	Sweden	Malmö FF	1943	1954	11	200	
Pauli Jørgensen	Denmark	Boldklubben Frem	1924	1942	18		
Mahboub Juma'a	Kuwait	Al-Salmiya	1972	1993	20		
Junqueira	Brazil	Palmeiras	1931	1945	14		
Mads Justesen	Denmark	Hobro	2004	2018	14	333	
André Kabile	France	Nîmes	1966	1979	13		
Sotiris Kaiafas	Cyprus	Omonia	1967	1984	17	388	
Edgar Kail	England	Dulwich Hamlet	1919	1933	14		
Kafunga	Brazil	Atlético Mineiro	1935	1955	20		
Peer Krom	Netherlands	Racing Club Heemstede	1915	1930	15		
Kunishige Kamamoto	Japan	Cerezo Osaka	1967	1984	17	251	
Fathi Kameel	Kuwait	Al-Tadamon	1971	1985	14		
Uwe Kamps	Germany	Borussia Mönchengladbach	1982	2004	22	457	
Ben Kantarovski	Australia	Newcastle Jets	2008	2022	14	196	
Anthimos Kapsis	Greece	Panathinaikos	1969	1984	15	319	
Mohammed Karam	Kuwait	Al-Arabi	1972	1986	14		
Vangel Kaundjiev	Bulgaria	Botev Plovdiv	1927	1942	15		
Christoffer Källqvist	Sweden	BK Häcken	2000	2019	19		
Erik Källström	Sweden	Elfsborg	1929	1941	12	193	
Mahmmoud Kanadil	Israel	Bnei Sakhnin	2008	2023	17	322	
Bertil Karlsson	Sweden	IFK Eskilstuna	1921	1936	15		
Tore Karlsson	Sweden	Degerfors IF	1942	1957	15		
Mick Kearns	England	Coventry City	1956	1969	13	344	
Mustafa Kefeli	Turkey	Vefa	1931	1945	14	126	
Piet Keizer	Netherlands	Ajax	1960	1975	15	364	
Tore Keller	Sweden	IK Sleipner	1924	1940	16	305	
Gary Kelly	Republic of Ireland	Leeds United	1991	2007	16	504	
Hughie Kelly	Scotland	Blackpool	1943	1960	17	428	
Khaled Khalaf	Kuwait	Al-Arabi	2003	2016	13		
Khaled Khalaila	Israel	Bnei Sakhnin	2000	2019	19	428	
Hady Khashaba	Egypt	Al Ahly	1990	2006	16	356	
Dzhemal Kherhadze	Soviet Union	Torpedo Kutaisi	1962	1976	14		
Kheireddine Kherris	Algeria	WA Tlemcen	1992	2010	18	500	
Bengt Nyholm	Sweden	IFK Norrköping	1948	1965	17	294	
Hussain Al-Khodari	Kuwait	Al-Salmiya	1990	2004	13		
Mahmoud Khordbin	Iran	Persepolis	1964	1980	16	170	
Werner Kik	West Germany	Rot-Weiss Essen	1960	1970	10		
Kim Jin-woo	South Korea	Suwon Samsung Bluewings	1996	2007	12	197	
Kim Kum-il	North Korea	25 April	2005	2017	12		
Kim Myong-Gil	North Korea	Amrokgang	2004	2025	21		
Kim Poong-joo	South Korea	Busan Daewoo Royals	1983	1996	12	159	
Kim Tae-young	South Korea	Jeonnam Dragons	1995	2005	11	199	
Kazushi Kimura	Japan	Yokohama F. Marinos	1981	1994	13		
Ledley King	England	Tottenham Hotspur	1998	2012	14	251	
Peter King	England	Cardiff City	1960	1974	14	356	
Halil Kiraz	Turkey	Göztepe	1958	1972	14		
Fikret Kırcan	Turkey	Fenerbahçe	1935	1956	21		
Mehmet Kızılgül	Turkey	Vefa	1935	1947	12	85	
Abdulla Koni	Qatar	Al-Sadd	1996	2014	18		
Frank Korpershoek	Netherlands	Telstar	2006	2021	15	341	
Hans-Jürgen Kreische	East Germany	Dynamo Dresden	1964	1978	14	256	
Ton de Kruijk	Netherlands	Utrecht	1976	1988	12	289	
Putte Kock	Sweden	AIK	1915	1928	13	(Note: In the spring of 1926, Kock was in Paris for an internship in the wood products industry and jumped into a match with US Suisse.)	
Uğur Köken	Turkey	Galatasaray	1959	1973	14	292	
Marcel Koller	Switzerland	Grasshoppers	1978	1997	19	428	
Hans-Jürgen Köper	West Germany	VfL Bochum	1970	1980	10	171	
Charly Körbel	Germany	Eintracht Frankfurt	1972	1991	19	602	
Bülent Korkmaz	Turkey	Galatasaray	1987	2005	18	430	
Robert Körner	Austria	Rapid Wien	1942	1958	16	213	
Inaxio Kortabarria	Spain	Real Sociedad	1971	1985	14	355	
Babis Kotridis	Greece	Olympiacos	1945	1961	16	223	
Giorgos Koudas	Greece	PAOK	1963	1984	21	504	
Vladimir Kragić	Kingdom of Yugoslavia	Hajduk Split	1929	1939	10	137	
Gennadi Krasnitsky	Soviet Union	Pakhtakor Tashkent	1960	1970	10	245	
Wim Kras	Netherlands	Volendam	1959	1973	14	400	
Patrick Kristensen	Denmark	AaB	2006	2020	14	302	
Per Kristoffersen	Norway	Fredrikstad	1956	1968	12	194	
Knut Kroon	Sweden	Helsingborg	1925	1941	16	269	
Günther Kubisch	East Germany	1. FC Magdeburg	1957	1971	14	326	
Milton Kuelle	Brazil	Grêmio	1952	1964	13	511	
Anatoliy Kuksov	Soviet Union	Zorya Luhansk	1969	1985	16	517	
Köbi Kuhn	Switzerland	Zürich	1961	1977	16	398	
Aleksandr Kupriyanov	Soviet Union	Krylia Sovetov Kuybyshev	1970	1980	10	328	
Muhteşem Kural	Turkey	Vefa	1929	1944	15	183	
Yuzo Kurihara	Japan	Yokohama F. Marinos	2003	2019	16	316	
Hakan Kutlu	Turkey	Ankaragücü	1992	2007	15	244	
Avni Kurgan	Turkey	Galatasaray	1929	1940	11	85	
Ernst Kuzorra	Germany	Schalke 04	1927	1950	23		
Sven-Agne Larsson	Sweden	BK Häcken	1940	1955	15	360	
Vladimir Gutsaev	Georgia	FC Dinamo Tbilisi	1971	1986	15	303	
Brian Labone	England	Everton	1958	1971	13	451	
Paul Lake	England	Manchester City	1986	1996	10	110	
Raoul Lambert	Belgium	Club Brugge	1962	1980	18	373	
Ray Lambert	Wales	Liverpool	1939	1956	17	308	
Juan Antonio Larrañaga	Spain	Real Sociedad	1980	1994	14	460	
Aitor Larrazábal	Spain	Athletic Bilbao	1990	2004	14	390	
Eddie Latheron	England	Blackburn Rovers	1906	1917	11		
Frode Lafton	Norway	Hønefoss BK	1994	2013	19	523	
Lau Wing-Yip	Hong Kong	Happy Valley	1973	1987	14		
Daníel Laxdal	Iceland	Stjarnan	2004	2024	21	375	
Tommy Law	Scotland	Chelsea	1925	1939	14	292	
Roy Law	England	Wimbledon	1958	1972	14	433	
Juan Carlos Leaño	Mexico	Estudiantes Tecos	1998	2012	14	300	
Mehmet Leblebi	Turkey	Galatasaray	1922	1936	14		
Leandro	Brazil	Flamengo	1978	1990	12	115	
Lee Jung-hyo	South Korea	Busan IPark	1999	2008	10	165	
Lee Tae-ho	South Korea	Daewoo Royals	1983	1992	10	170	
John Leeuwerik	Netherlands	De Graafschap	1981	1992	11		
Radu Lefter	Romania	Ceahlăul Piatra Neamț	1992	2004	12	229	
Leo Lemešić	Kingdom of Yugoslavia	Hajduk Split	1924	1940	16	179	
Leong Chon Kit	Macau	PSP Macau	2002	2022	20		
Mario Lepe	Chile	Universidad Católica	1980	2000	20	450	
Jack Leslie	England	Plymouth Argyle	1921	1934	13	384	
Jim Lewis	Wales	Watford	1931	1944	13	111	
Li Xiaopeng	China	Shandong Taishan	1994	2005	12	217	
Billy Liddell	Scotland	Liverpool	1939	1961	22	534	
Dieter Lieberwirth	West Germany	1. FC Nürnberg	1975	1989	14	270	
Folke Lind	Sweden	GAIS	1932	1948	16	305	
Toni Lindenhahn	Germany	Hallescher FC	2008	2023	15	268	
Vigor Lindberg	Sweden	IK Sleipner	1915	1931	16	137	
Dieter Lindner	West Germany	Eintracht Frankfurt	1956	1971	15	321	
Åke Lindman	Finland	IFK Helsingfors	1946	1960	14		
Liu Jindong	China	Shandong Taishan	2000	2014	14	227	
Nat Lofthouse	England	Bolton Wanderers	1939	1960	21	452	
Gennady Logofet	Soviet Union	Spartak Moscow	1960	1975	15	349	
Terry Long	England	Crystal Palace	1955	1969	14	442	
Juanma López	Spain	Atlético Madrid	1990	2001	11	156	
Manuel Loureda	Spain	Deportivo La Coruña	1961	1974	13	286	
Wolfram Löwe	East Germany	Lokomotive Leipzig	1964	1980	16	351	
Alberto López Oliva	Guatemala	C.S.D. Municipal	1963	1978	15		
Giacomo Losi	Italy	Roma	1955	1969	14	386	
Juan Machuca	Chile	Unión Española	1969	1987	18		
Cesare Lovati	Italy	Milan	1910	1922	12	104	
Mircea Luca	Romania	Universitatea Cluj	1939	1956	17	201	
Tom Lund	Norway	Lillestrøm	1967	1982	15	253	
Slavko Luštica	Yugoslavia	Hajduk Split	1944	1957	13	226	
Konstantin Lyaskovskiy	Soviet Union	CSKA Moscow	1926	1949	23	153	
Mark van der Maarel	Netherlands	Utrecht	2009	2024	15	363	
Richard Macadie	Scotland	Wick Academy	2003	2025	20 (Note: Was on loan in the 2004–05 and 2005–06 seasons where he had not played.)	647	
Joaquim Machado	Portugal	Porto	1945	1955	10	184	
Dumitru Macri	Romania	Rapid București	1950	1965	15	231	
Willie Maddren	England	Middlesbrough	1969	1979	10	293	
Paul Madeley	England	Leeds United	1963	1980	17	536	
Georgios Magiras	Greece	AEK Athens	1933	1949	16	9	
Sepp Maier	West Germany	Bayern Munich	1962	1979	17	536	
Vyacheslav Malafeev	Russia	Zenit Saint Petersburg	1999	2016	17	322	
Stephen Malcolm	Jamaica	Seba United	1989	2001	12		
Paolo Maldini	Italy	Milan	1984	2009	25	647	
Costin Maleș	Romania	Oțelul Galați	1988	2003	15	323	
Maurice Malpas	Scotland	Dundee United	1979	2000	21	617	
Vladimir Maminov	Russia	Lokomotiv Moscow	1992	2008	16	400	
Fawaz Mando	Syria	Al-Karamah	1988	2000	12		
Petre Mândru	Romania	Progresul București	1955	1969	14	208	
Stelios Manolas	Greece	AEK Athens	1979	1998	19	448	
Rahim Karim Manshad	Iraq	Al-Mina'a	1970	1985	15		
Francisco Manteigueiro	Portugal	Sporting da Covilhã	1953	1971	18		
Michael Manzini	South Africa	Mamelodi Sundowns	1995	2009	14	274	
Mao Biao	China	Tianjin Jinmen Tiger	2005	2017	12	164	
Ali Maqseed	Kuwait	Al-Arabi	2005	2020	15		
Marcos	Brazil	Palmeiras	1992	2011	19	532	
Alberto Marcovecchio	Argentina	Racing	1912	1922	10		
Adam Marjan	Kuwait	Kuwait	1975	1987	12		
Kleanthis Maropoulos	Greece	AEK Athens	1934	1952	18	53	
Malte Mårtensson	Sweden	Helsingborg	1934	1953	19	612	
Fred Martin	Scotland	Aberdeen	1950	1960	10	296	
José María Martínez	Spain	Real Sociedad	1964	1976	12	321	
João Martins	Portugal	Sporting CP	1947	1959	12	204	
Vítor Martins	Portugal	Benfica	1968	1979	11	149	
Nicolas Marx	France	Nîmes	1992	2002	10	72+	
Georgios Masadis	Greece	Veria	1966	1981	15	368	
René Masclaux	France	Reims	1963	1979	16		
Jimmy Mason	Scotland	Third Lanark	1936	1952	16	207	
Ray Mathias	England	Tranmere Rovers	1964	1985	21	567	
Vladimir Matijević	Bosnia and Herzegovina	Velež Mostar	1974	1987	13	271	
Masanobu Matsunami	Japan	Gamba Osaka	1993	2005	12	280	
Naoki Matsuyo	Japan	Gamba Osaka	1997	2009	12	131	
Jean-Philippe Mattio	France	Nice	1982	1998	16	304	
Abdullah Mayouf	Kuwait	Kazma	1970	1986	16		
Andrés Mazali	Uruguay	Nacional	1919	1930	11	267	
Sandro Mazzola	Italy	Inter Milan	1961	1977	16	417	
Giovanni Mazzoni	Italy	Parma	1921	1934	13	226	
Ian McAllister	Scotland	Ayr United	1977	1991	14	405	
James McAlpine	Scotland	Queen's Park	1919	1934	15	473	
Iain McChesney	Scotland	Queen of the South	1960	1981	21	483	
John McDermott	England	Grimsby Town	1987	2007	20	647	
Tony McDonnell	Republic of Ireland	University College Dublin	1993	2007	14	308	
Jock McEwan	Scotland	Kilmarnock	1923	1935	12	353	
Jimmy McGowan	Scotland	Partick Thistle	1941	1956	15	243	
Jackie McGrory	Scotland	Kilmarnock	1960	1973	13	336	
Stuart McLean	Scotland	Kilmarnock	1974	1990	16	475	
Bob McKinlay	Scotland	Nottingham Forest	1949	1969	20	614	
Donald McKinlay	Scotland	Liverpool	1910	1929	19	434	
Donnie McKinnon	Scotland	Partick Thistle	1960	1973	13	224	
Eddie McLeod	Scotland	Partick Thistle	1926	1939	13	394	
Donald McNeil	Scotland	Dumbarton	1975	1991	16	274	
Billy McNeill	Scotland	Celtic	1958	1975	17	486	
Paul McStay	Scotland	Celtic	1981	1997	16	515	
Norrie McWhirter	Scotland	St Mirren	1986	1999	13	276	
Hartmut Meinert	East Germany	HFC Chemie	1970	1984	14	283	
David Meiklejohn	Scotland	Rangers	1919	1936	17	490	
Soud Al-Mejmed	Kuwait	Qadsia	2008	2019	11		
Werner Melzer	West Germany	1. FC Kaiserslautern	1974	1986	12	374	
Virgílio Mendes	Portugal	Porto	1947	1962	15	346	
Antônio Menezes	Brazil	Bangu	1942	1955	14	333	
Yosef Merimovich	Israel	Maccabi Tel Aviv	1940	1958	18		
Franz Merkhoffer	West Germany	Eintracht Braunschweig	1968	1984	16	496	
Reinaldo Merlo	Argentina	River Plate	1969	1984	15	500	
Gil Merrick	England	Birmingham City	1946	1960	14	485	
Siegmund Mewes	East Germany	1. FC Magdeburg	1970	1985	15	296	
Klaus Meyer	West Germany	Eintracht Braunschweig	1958	1968	10	204	
Lucky Mhlathe	South Africa	Jomo Cosmos	1997	2011	14		
Claude Michel	France	Guingamp	1992	2005	13	438	
Jean Acédo	France	Gueugnon	1982	1999	17		
José Duch	France	Gueugnon	1967	1987	20	331+	
Rinus Michels	Netherlands	Ajax	1946	1958	12	264	
Biser Mihaylov	Bulgaria	Levski Sofia	1961	1975	14	226	
Thomas Militão	Portugal	Caldas	2012	2025	14	384	
Luc Millecamps	Belgium	KSV Waregem	1969	1986	17	421	
Marc Millecamps	Belgium	KSV Waregem	1968	1988	20	563	
Brian Miller	England	Burnley	1955	1966	11	379	
Juliusz Miller	Poland	Czarni Lwów	1908	1924	16		
Willie Miller	Scotland	Hibernian	1916	1928	12	275	
Willie Miller	Scotland	Aberdeen	1972	1990	18	558	
Roly Mills	England	Northampton Town	1954	1964	10	305	
Luis Minguela	Spain	Real Valladolid	1977	1992	15	366	
Dolo Mistone	Italy	Napoli	1955	1966	11		
Mher Mkrtumyan	Armenia	Lernayin Artsakh	2005	2021	16	29+	
Jürgen Moll	West Germany	Eintracht Braunschweig	1957	1968	11	280	
Campbell Money	Scotland	St Mirren	1981	2006	15	336	
Jorge Henán Monge	Costa Rica	Deportivo Saprissa	1953	1967	14	136	
Juan Monjardín	Spain	Real Madrid	1918	1929	11	1	
Jimmy Montanero	Ecuador	Barcelona SC	1979	1999	20		
Joaquín Montañés	Spain	Alemannia Aachen	1972	1989	17	541	
Mario Montesanto	Italy	Bologna	1930	1942	12		
Thabo Mooki	South Africa	Kaizer Chiefs	1993	2008	15	343	
Charlie Moore	England	Bradford City	1926	1939	13	339	
Watty Moore	England	Hartlepool	1948	1960	12	447	
Ronnie Moran	England	Liverpool	1952	1968	16	343	
Hiroaki Morishima	Japan	Cerezo Osaka	1991	2008	17	425	
Thomas Mork	Norway	Molde	1997	2008	11	202	
Max Morlock	West Germany	1. FC Nürnberg	1940	1964	24	472	
Bob Morton	England	Luton Town	1946	1964	18	495	
Yuriy Moskalets	Soviet Union	Vorskla Poltava	1964	1981	17		
Bert Mozley	England	Derby County	1945	1955	10	297	
Eduard Mudrik	Soviet Union	Dynamo Moscow	1957	1968	11	172	
Mudzar Mohamad	Malaysia	Pahang FA	1986	2001	15		
Jimmy Mullen	England	Wolverhampton Wanderers	1939	1960	21	445	
Joachim Müller	East Germany	FC Karl-Marx-Stadt	1970	1986	16	365	
Jochen Müller	Germany	Turbine Erfurt	1942	1962	20	278	
John Murphy	Scotland	Ayr United	1963	1978	15	459	
Braulio Musso	Chile	Club Universidad de Chile	1951	1968	17	382	
Sebastian Nachreiner	Germany	Jahn Regensburg	2010	2023	13	252	
Shaye Al-Nafisah	Saudi Arabia	Al-Kawkab	1978	1991	13		
Ioan Nagy	Romania	Brașov	1972	1990	18	403	
Kengo Nakamura	Japan	Kawasaki Frontale	2003	2020	17	546	
Mukhlis Nakata	Indonesia	Persiraja Banda Aceh	2009	2025	16	111	
Nam Song-chol	North Korea	25 April	2003	2017	14		
José Naranjo	Mexico	C.D. Oro	1944	1960	16		
Mehmet Reşat Nayır	Turkey	Fenerbahçe	1928	1940	12		
Alexandru Neagu	Romania	Rapid București	1965	1978	13	286	
Jackie Neilson	Scotland	St Mirren	1949	1960	11	215	
Nélito	Portugal	Braga	1977	1990	13	160	
Mihai Nemțanu	Romania	Ceahlăul Piatra Neamț	1996	2007	11	153	
Nené	Portugal	Benfica	1967	1986	19	423	
Andriy Nesmachnyi	Ukraine	Dynamo Kyiv	1998	2011	13	227	
David Ness	Scotland	Partick Thistle	1923	1935	12	340	
Igor Netto	Soviet Union	Spartak Moscow	1948	1966	18		
Gary Neville	England	Manchester United	1992	2011	19	400	
Nguyễn Thanh Bình	Vietnam	SHB Da Nang	2011	2024	13	170	
Jack Nicholas	England	Derby County	1928	1947	19	347	
Bill Nicholson	England	Tottenham Hotspur	1938	1955	17		
Per Nielsen	Denmark	Brøndby	1993	2008	15	394	
Poul Nielsen	Denmark	KB	1907	1927	20	201	
Shochi Niiyama	Japan	Vanraure Hachinohe	2008	2024	17	308	
Jim Nildén	Sweden	AIK	1961	1971	10	124	
Erik Nilsson	Sweden	Malmö FF	1934	1953	19	326	
Ninho	Brazil	Coritiba	1921	1938	15		
Jürgen Nöldner	East Germany	1. FC Frankfurt	1959	1973	14	285	
Hans Nordahl	Norway	Skeid	1938	1960	22		
Sven Lindqvist	Sweden	AIK	1920	1931	11	131	
Vilhelm Wolfhagen	Denmark	KB	1906	1918	12		
Wilhelm Petersén	Sweden	AIK	1924	1939	15		
Fredrik Nordback	Finland	Örebro SK	1995	2011	16	301	
Tore Nordtvedt	Norway	Brann	1963	1979	16		
Olli Huttunen	Finland	Haka	1978	1995	17	431	
Czesław Nowicki	Poland	Lechia Gdańsk	1951	1966	15	269	
Moses Nsereko	Uganda	Kampala City Council	1970	1984	14		
Arne Nyberg	Sweden	IFK Göteborg	1932	1950	18		
Herbert Oberhofer	Austria	Admira Wacker Mödling	1973	1990	17	429	
Walter Koleznik	Austria	Grazer AK	1961	1978	17	401	
Ludwig Drescher	Denmark	KB	1903	1915	12		
Sven Andersson	Sweden	AIK	1928	1940	12		
Ernst Andersson	Sweden	IFK Göteborg	1927	1943	16	277	
Pedro Ochoa	Argentina	Racing	1916	1931	15		
Kevin O'Connor	Republic of Ireland	Brentford	1999	2015	16	426	
Segun Odegbami	Nigeria	Shooting Stars	1970	1984	14		
Alberto Ohaco	Argentina	Racing	1911	1921	10	278	
Olof Ohlsson	Sweden	IFK Eskilstuna	1903	1915	12		
Kenneth Ohlsson	Sweden	Hammarby IF	1966	1983	17	396	
Takeshi Okada	Japan	JEF United Chiba	1980	1990	10		
Tarik Okanović	Bosnia and Herzegovina	Sloboda Tuzla	2000	2011	11		
Julio Olaizola	Spain	Real Sociedad	1974	1985	11	250	
Andriy Oliynyk	Ukraine	Kremin Kremenchuk	2004	2021	17	245	
Constantin Olteanu	Romania	Argeș Pitești	1964	1978	14	295	
Mihai Olteanu	Romania	Mioveni	2003	2014	11	286	
Diego García	Argentina	San Lorenzo	1925	1940	15	300	
Svend Aage Castella	Denmark	KB	1907	1924	17		
Albert Olsson	Sweden	GAIS	1915	1931	16		
Gunnar Olsson	Sweden	GAIS	1926	1937	11		
Osama Orabi	Egypt	Al Ahly	1982	1999	17		
Raúl Ormeño	Chile	Colo-Colo	1975	1991	16		
Tommy Orr	Scotland	Greenock Morton	1946	1958	12	257	
Cristóbal Ortega	Mexico	América	1974	1992	18		
Pepe Ortiz	Spain	Sporting Gijón	1949	1963	14	307	
Gilberto Osorio	Colombia	Atlético Nacional	1959	1972	13	512	
Othman Al-Ossimi	Kuwait	Qadsia	1960	1971	11		
Hidekazu Otani	Japan	Kashiwa Reysol	2003	2022	19	479	
Mohamed Ouda	Egypt	Al Mokawloon	1993	2009	16		
Wolfgang Overath	West Germany	1. FC Köln	1963	1977	14	409	
Killian Overmeire	Belgium	Lokeren	2003	2020	17	437	
Hayati Ozgan	Turkey	Beşiktaş	1926	1941	15	172	
Ahmet Özacar	Turkey	Beşiktaş	1955	1971	16	372	
Coşkun Özarı	Turkey	Galatasaray	1948	1960	12	120	
Sedat Özden	Turkey	Bursaspor	1973	1986	13	336	
Orhan Özselek	Turkey	Bursaspor	1967	1977	10	190	
Boris Paichadze	Soviet Union	Dinamo Tbilisi	1936	1951	15		
Bob Paisley	England	Liverpool	1939	1954	15	253	
Johnny Palacios	Honduras	Olimpia	2003	2019	16	224	
Vangelis Panakis	Greece	Panathinaikos	1951	1965	14	91	
Yevhen Panfilov	Soviet Union	Metalist Kharkiv	1958	1969	11	312	
Daniil Papadopoulos	Greece	Iraklis	1981	1998	17	419	
Claude Papi	France	Bastia	1967	1982	15	410	
Jean-Marc Vicenti	France	Bastia	1959	1971	12		
Jean-Jean Camadini	France	Bastia	1959	1971	12		
Glyn Pardoe	England	Manchester City	1962	1976	14	305	
Víctor Paredes	Argentina	Atlanta	1990	2002	12	333	
Börje Leander	Sweden	AIK	1938	1953	15	249	
Park Tae-ha	South Korea	Pohang Steelers	1991	2001	10	189	
Tommy Parker	England	Ipswich Town	1946	1957	11		
Harry Parkes	England	Aston Villa	1939	1955	16	320	
Ezio Pascutti	Italy	Bologna	1955	1969	14	296	
Jim Patterson	Scotland	Queen of the South	1949	1963	14	361	
Logan Pause	United States	Chicago Fire	2003	2014	11	286	
Keith Peacock	England	Charlton Athletic	1962	1979	17	532	
Arne Pedersen	Norway	Fredrikstad	1950	1966	16	231	
Trond Pedersen	Norway	Start	1973	1984	11	269	
Pedro	Portugal	Paços de Ferreira	1993	2009	16	276	
Pedro Daniel Pellegata	Argentina	Tigre	1969	1980	11	360	
Manuel Pellegrini	Chile	Universidad de Chile	1973	1986	13	451	
Frank Penn	England	Fulham	1915	1934	19		
Jesse Pennington	England	West Bromwich Albion	1903	1922	19	455	
Pepe	Brazil	Santos	1954	1969	15	750	
Vicente Pereda	Mexico	Toluca FC	1960	1976	16	322	
Philippe Perret	Switzerland	Neuchâtel	1978	1998	20	540	
Loïc Perrin	France	Saint-Étienne	2003	2020	17	391	
Natalio Pescia	Argentina	Boca Juniors	1942	1957	15	347	
Hans Pesser	Austria	Rapid Wien	1930	1942	12	146	
Harald Hansen	Denmark	B.93	1899	1916	17		
Jean Petit	France	Monaco	1969	1982	13	428	
Sergei Petrenko	Soviet Union	Torpedo Moscow	1972	1985	13	276	
Nicolae Petrescu	Romania	Juventus București	1931	1941	11	144	
Sophus Hansen	Denmark	Boldklubben Frem	1906	1921	15	160	
Ingar Pettersen	Norway	Strømsgodset	1966	1980	14		
Steinar Pettersen	Norway	Strømsgodset	1962	1975	13		
Inge Thun	Norway	Strømsgodset	1962	1977	15	329	
Paul Berth	Denmark	Akademisk Boldklub	1908	1924	16		
Muslihittin Peykoğlu	Turkey	Galatasaray	1921	1934	13		
Fernando Peyroteo	Portugal	Sporting CP	1937	1949	12	197	
Gholam Peyrovani	Iran	Bargh Shiraz	1969	1992	23		
Hans Pflügler	Germany	Bayern Munich	1981	1992	11	277	
Pichichi	Spain	Athletic Bilbao	1911	1922	11	0	
Kristian Middelboe	Denmark	KB	1898	1910	12		
José Piendibene	Uruguay	Peñarol	1908	1928	20	506	
Vicente Piera	Spain	Barcelona	1920	1933	13	53	
Mario Pietruzzi	Italy	Alessandria	1938	1953	15	283	
José Antonio Pikabea	Spain	Real Sociedad	1992	2002	10	292	
Jack Pinder	England	York City	1932	1948	16		
João Pinto	Portugal	Porto	1981	1997	16	407	
Sepp Piontek	West Germany	Werder Bremen	1960	1972	12	278	
Adnan İbrahim Pirioğlu	Turkey	Galatasaray	1908	1921	13		
Marc Planus	France	Bordeaux	2002	2015	13	300	
Juan Carlos Plata	Guatemala	C.S.D. Municipal	1990	2010	20	553	
Christophe Point	France	Caen	1981	1995	14	302	
Cristinel Pojar	Romania	Universitatea Cluj	1984	1998	14	194	
Bram van Polen	Netherlands	PEC Zwolle	2007	2024	17	454	
Kostas Polychroniou	Greece	Olympiacos	1954	1968	14	305	
Jürgen Pommerenke	East Germany	1. FC Magdeburg	1970	1985	15	301	
Jimmy Porter	Scotland	Bury	1921	1935	14	396	
Fritz Pott	West Germany	1. FC Köln	1958	1970	12	228	
Oskar Nørland	Denmark	KB	1898	1918	20		
Billy Poulson	England	Port Vale	1879	1891	12	34	
Tommy Powell	England	Derby County	1942	1961	19	380	
Christos Poyiatzis	Cyprus	Ethnikos Achnas	1995	2017	22	416	
Preguinho	Brazil	Fluminense	1925	1938	13		
Édouard Kargu	France	Bordeaux	1947	1958	11	348	
Dieter Prestin	West Germany	1. FC Köln	1975	1989	14	246	
Thomas Preston	Scotland	Airdrieonians	1921	1932	11	320	
Mario Pretto	Italy	Napoli	1937	1949	12	223	
Jean-Marie Prévost	France	Lille	1936	1952	11 (Note: He played for Olympique Lillois between 1936 and 1944, year when the club merged with SC Fives to form Lille OSC. Prévost did not play between 1939 and 1945 due to World War II where he was taken prisoner and so remained unattached until 1945 when he played with new team Lille OSC.)		
Xabi Prieto	Spain	Real Sociedad	2003	2018	15	477	
Louis Provelli	France	Valenciennes-Anzin	1957	1970	13	269	
Antonio Puchades	Spain	Valencia	1946	1958	12	256	
Claude Puel	France	Monaco	1979	1996	17	488	
Selahattin Pural	Turkey	Vefa	1929	1942	13	112	
Carles Puyol	Spain	Barcelona	1999	2014	15	392	
Quarentinha	Brazil	Paysandu	1955	1973	19	750	
Jamal Al-Qabendi	Kuwait	Kazma	1979	1990	11		
Félix Quesada	Spain	Real Madrid	1922	1936	14	87	
Vladimir Quesada	Costa Rica	Deportivo Saprissa	1985	1999	14	41	
Quim	Portugal	Vitória de Setúbal	1986	2000	14	438	
Jimmy Quinn	Scotland	Celtic	1900	1915	15	272	
Jürgen Raab	East Germany	Carl Zeiss Jena	1976	1993	17	376	
Johan Radet	France	Auxerre	1996	2007	11	191	
Flávio Ramos	Brazil	Botafogo	1904	1913	10		
Jos Randles	England	Port Vale	1885	1899	14	37	
Steffen Rasmussen	Denmark	AGF	2001	2018	17	404	
Thorbjørn Holst Rasmussen	Denmark	Silkeborg	2006	2016	10	168	
Antonio Rattin	Argentina	Boca Juniors	1956	1970	14	352	
Detlef Raugust	East Germany	1. FC Magdeburg	1972	1986	14	226	
Doug Rees	Wales	Ipswich Town	1948	1959	11	356	
Thomas Reifeltshammer	Austria	Ried	2009	2021	12	245	
Lawrie Reilly	Scotland	Hibernian	1946	1958	12	252	
Rodolfo Reis	Portugal	Porto	1972	1984	12	243	
Thomas Renault	France	Orléans	2002	2020	18	254	
Pascal Drouet	France	Orléans	1971	1985	14		
Henryk Reyman	Poland	Wisła Kraków	1914	1933	19		
Ri Myong-dok	North Korea	Pyongyang	2003	2017	14		
Lars Ricken	Germany	Borussia Dortmund	1993	2007	14	301	
Guillermo Ríos	Argentina	Independiente	1984	1997	13	358	
Ola By Rise	Norway	Rosenborg	1977	1995	18	349	
Oshri Roash	Israel	Hapoel Haifa	2007	2017	10	257	
Ahmet Robenson	Turkey	Galatasaray	1905	1915	10		
Garreth Roberts	England	Hull City	1978	1991	13	409	
Alan Robertson	Scotland	Kilmarnock	1972	1989	17	471	
Robert Robertson	Scotland	St Mirren	1901	1912	11	253	
Jean Robin	France	Marseille	1938	1953	15		
Roman Rogocz	Poland	Lechia Gdańsk	1947	1962	15	161	
Álvaro Gestido	Uruguay	Peñarol	1926	1940	14	445	
Giorgos Giamalis	Greece	AEK Athens	1926	1932	15		
Christos Ribas	Greece	AEK Athens	1929	1948	19		
José Francisco Rojo	Spain	Athletic Bilbao	1965	1982	17	413	
Helmut Roleder	West Germany	VfB Stuttgart	1972	1986	14		
Giacomo Rolla	Italy	Genoa	1910	1921	11		
Hussain Al-Romaihi	Qatar	Qatar SC	1994	2013	19	247	
Livio Roncoli	Italy	Atalanta	1949	1963	14		
Chi Rongliang	China	Tianjin Jinmen Tiger	1997	2009	12	167	
Axel Roos	Germany	1. FC Kaiserslautern	1984	2001	17	397	
Nils Rosén	Sweden	Helsingborg	1922	1937	15		
Badal Roy	Bangladesh	Dhaka Mohammedan	1977	1989	12		
Miguel Ángel Rubio	Spain	Lleida	1982	1996	14	460	
Vasil Ruci	Albania	Flamurtari Vlorë	1976	1993	17		
Cas Ruffelse	Netherlands	Sparta Rotterdam	1907	1926	19	282	
Richard Rufus	England	Charlton Athletic	1993	2004	11		
Carlos Ruiz	Argentina	Arsenal de Sarandí	1993	2008	15		
Sjef van Run	Netherlands	PSV	1926	1942	16	359	
Miguel Ángel Russo	Argentina	Estudiantes La Plata	1975	1988	13		
Fred Rutten	Netherlands	Twente	1979	1992	13		
Keith Ryan	England	Wycombe Wanderers	1990	2006	16		
Henrik Rydström	Sweden	Kalmar FF	1994	2013	19	551	
Naeem Saad	Kuwait	Al-Tadamon	1975	1990	15		
Ebrahim Sadeghi	Iran	Saipa	2000	2016	16	438	
Hussein Saeed	Iraq	Al-Talaba	1975	1990	15		
Ted Sagar	England	Everton	1929	1953	24	463	
Emili Sagi-Barba	Spain	Barcelona	1915	1932	17	25	
Faruk Sağnak	Turkey	Beşiktaş	1944	1955	11	115	
Dhari Said	Kuwait	Qadsia	2008	2024	16		
Samir Said	Kuwait	Al-Arabi	1980	1996	15		
Masato Saito	Japan	Omiya Ardija	1998	2009	11	304	
Esam Sakeen	Kuwait	Kazma	1989	2006	16		
Andrzej Salach	Poland	Lechia Gdańsk	1977	1993	16	305	
Radhouane Salhi	Tunisia	Étoile du Sahel	1986	2001	15	201	
Joseph Saliba	Malta	Qormi	1992	2011	19		
Rubens Salles	Brazil	Paulistano	1906	1921	16		
Chea Samnang	Cambodia	Svay Rieng FC	2010	2023	13	40+	
Sok Samnang	Cambodia	Svay Rieng FC	2010	2023	13		
Jesús Sánchez	Mexico	Guadalajara	2010	2024	14	286	
Manolo Sanchís	Spain	Real Madrid	1983	2001	18	533	
Gösta Sandberg	Sweden	Djurgården	1951	1966	15	322	
Einar Middelboe	Denmark	KB	1900	1914	14		
Noritada Saneyoshi	Japan	Gamba Osaka	1995	2007	12	236	
Francisco Sanjosé	Spain	Sevilla	1971	1986	15	373	
Santana	Portugal	Benfica	1954	1967	13	104	
Carlos Santana	Costa Rica	Deportivo Saprissa	1972	1984	12	419	
Nilton Santos	Brazil	Botafogo	1948	1964	16	718	
Valentyn Sapronov	Soviet Union	Shakhtar Donetsk	1952	1963	11	205	
Hani Al-Saqer	Kuwait	Qadsia	1990	2003	12		
Fernando Saraceni	Italy	Lazio	1907	1924	17		
Stavros Sarafis	Greece	PAOK	1967	1981	14	358	
Thanasis Saravakos	Greece	Panionios	1951	1966	15	173	
Sanlı Sarıalioğlu	Turkey	Beşiktaş	1962	1975	13	315	
György Sárosi	Hungary	Ferencváros	1931	1948	17		
Sadok Sassi	Tunisia	Club Africain	1962	1979	17	335	
Mehmet Salim Şatıroğlu	Turkey	Galatasaray	1932	1949	17	211	
Marinos Satsias	Cyprus	APOEL	1995	2014	19		
Jesús María Satrústegui	Spain	Real Sociedad	1973	1986	13	297	
Hüsnü Savman	Turkey	Beşiktaş	1927	1944	17		
Masaaki Sawanobori	Japan	Shimizu S-Pulse	1992	2005	13		
Aurelio Scagnellato	Italy	Padova	1951	1964	13		
Alessandro Scarioni	Italy	Milan	1908	1921	13		
Mark Scerri	Malta	Sliema Wanderers	2005	2024	19	315	
Thomas Schaaf	Germany	Werder Bremen	1978	1995	17	281	
Pedro Arispe	Uruguay	Rampla Juniors	1919	1937	18		
Hans Schäfer	West Germany	1. FC Köln	1948	1965	17	394	
Dieter Scherbarth	East Germany	BSG Chemie Leipzig	1957	1975	18	403	
Angelo Schiavio	Italy	Bologna	1922	1938	16		
Henny Schilder	Netherlands	Volendam	2005	2018	13	392	
Marcel Schmelzer	Germany	Borussia Dortmund	2008	2022	14	258	
Andreas Schmidt	Germany	Hertha BSC	1991	2008	17		
Walter Schmidt	West Germany	Eintracht Braunschweig	1959	1969	10	317	
Paul Scholes	England	Manchester United	1994	2013	19	493	
Marco Schönbächler	Switzerland	Zürich	2006	2022	16	292	
Peter Schöttel	Austria	Rapid Wien	1986	2001	15	436	
Arnold Schütz	West Germany	Werder Bremen	1955	1972	17	333	
Harry Schreurs	Netherlands	RFC Roermond	1921	1935	14		
Yisha'ayahu Schwager	Israel	Maccabi Haifa	1962	1976	14	360	
Hans-Georg Schwarzenbeck	West Germany	Bayern Munich	1966	1980	14	416	
Maksim Medvedev	Azerbaijan	Qarabağ	2006	2024	18	376	
Erich Obermayer	Austria	Austria Wien	1971	1989	18	544	
George Scoones	England	Rennes	1912	1922	10		
Zach Scott	United States	Seattle Sounders FC	2002	2016	14	272	
Roger Scotti	France	Marseille	1942	1958	16		
Günter Sebert	West Germany	Waldhof Mannheim	1966	1987	21	592	
Urbain Wallet	France	Amiens	1916	1932	16		
Thierry Dobelle	France	Amiens	1984	1997	13		
Robert Buchot	France	Amiens	1962	1975	13		
Paul Imiéla	France	Amiens	1965	1980	15	395	
Yuri Sedov	Soviet Union	Spartak Moscow	1947	1959	12		
Wolfgang Seguin	East Germany	1. FC Magdeburg	1964	1981	17	403	
Uwe Seeler	West Germany	Hamburger SV (Note: Appeared in a one-off sponsored event for Cork Celtic six years after he retired in 1972. He was told by his sponsor Adidas that this was a charity match. However, it turned out to be an official League of Ireland match.)	1953	1972	19	476	
Niyazi Sel	Turkey	Fenerbahçe	1928	1938	10		
Turgay Semercioğlu	Turkey	Trabzonspor	1973	1988	15	402	
Léon Semmeling	Belgium	Standard Liège	1959	1974	15	449	
Ger Senden	Netherlands	Roda	1989	2008	19	442	
Mustafa Şenkal	Turkey	Vefa	1942	1953	11	151	
Kemal Serdar	Turkey	Trabzonspor	1983	1995	12	357	
Hüseyin Seyid	Turkey	Vefa	1929	1945	16	146	
Ahmed Şerafettin	Turkey	Beşiktaş	1911	1925	14		
Stelios Serafidis	Greece	AEK Athens	1953	1972	19	244	
Turgay Şeren	Turkey	Galatasaray	1947	1967	20	352	
Nicolas Seube	France	Caen	2001	2017	16	520	
Cevat Seyit	Turkey	Fenerbahçe	1925	1937	12		
Abdul Ghani Shahad	Iraq	Al-Najaf	1987	1999	12		
Isaac Shai	South Africa	Mamelodi Sundowns	1992	2004	12	315	
Mohammad Al-Shalhoub	Saudi Arabia	Al-Hilal	1998	2020	22	334	
Hamed Shami	Qatar	Al-Gharafa	1999	2016	17	250	
Fahad Al Shammari	Qatar	Al-Gharafa	1999	2019	20	280	
Willie Sharp	Scotland	Partick Thistle	1939	1957	18	255	
Archie Shaw	Scotland	Motherwell	1946	1958	12	256	
Joe Shaw	England	Sheffield United	1945	1966	21	632	
Ron Shaw	England	Torquay United	1946	1958	12		
Wilf Shaw	England	Doncaster Rovers	1930	1944	14	180	
Georgi Shchennikov	Russia	CSKA Moscow	2008	2023	15	260	
Saleh Al Sheikh	Kuwait	Qadsia	2000	2022	22		
Bert Shelley	England	Southampton	1919	1932	13		
Ken Shellito	England	Chelsea	1957	1969	12	123	
Hamoud Al-Shemmari	Kuwait	Kazma	1977	1990	13		
Albert Shesternyov	Soviet Union	CSKA Moscow	1959	1972	13		
Shéu	Portugal	Benfica	1972	1989	17	349	
Danny Shmulevich-Rom	Israel	Maccabi Haifa	1958	1973	15	283	
Roman Shneyderman	Soviet Union	Dnipro Dnipropetrovsk	1966	1977	11	360	
Shu Chang	China	Shandong Taishan	1996	2010	14	273	
John Shuker	England	Oxford United	1962	1977	15	478	
Itzhak Shum	Israel	Hapoel Kfar Saba	1964	1983	19	504	
Anton Shunin	Russia	Dynamo Moscow	2007	2024	17	339	
Viktor Shustikov	Soviet Union	Torpedo Moscow	1958	1973	15		
Dmytro Shutkov	Ukraine	Shakhtar Donetsk	1991	2008	17	267	
Nawaf Al Shuwaye	Kuwait	Al-Arabi	2003	2015	12		
Gerald Sibeko	South Africa	Kaizer Chiefs	2000	2012	12		
Eric Sikora	France	Lens	1985	2004	19	511	
Paul Simeoni	France	Cannes	1959	1969	10	174	
Karl Simonsson	Sweden	Jönköpings Södra IF	1939	1951	12		
Denis Sinyayev	Russia	Avangard Kursk	2003	2022	19	477	
Gustav Sjöberg	Sweden	AIK	1938	1953	15	249	
Artsyom Skitaw	Belarus	Vitebsk	2009	2024	16	331	
Abdulnaser Slil	Libya	Al-Ittihad	2001	2014	13	25+	
Tommy Smart	England	Aston Villa	1920	1934	14		
Alan Smith	Scotland	Torquay United	1957	1969	12		
Alex Smith	Scotland	Rangers	1894	1915	21	406	
Doug Smith	Scotland	Dundee United	1958	1976	18	456	
Nicol Smith	Scotland	Rangers	1893	1905	12	168	
Sep Smith	England	Leicester City	1929	1949	20	350	
Jean Antunès	France	Wasquehal	1994	2007	13		
Nikolai Smolnikov	Soviet Union	Neftchi Baku	1967	1979	12		
Einar Snitt	Sweden	Sandvikens IF	1920	1939	19		
Albert Snouck Hurgronje	Netherlands	HVV Den Haag	1920	1932	12	224	
Hitoshi Sogahata	Japan	Kashima Antlers	1998	2020	22	538	
Allan Søgaard	Denmark	Horsens	1995	2010	15	304	
Egil Solberg	Norway	Mjøndalen	1969	1982	13		
Paco Soler	Spain	Mallorca	1990	2004	14	339	
Adrian Solomon	Romania	Ceahlăul Piatra Neamț	1985	2005	20	232	
Marceau Somerlinck	France	Lille	1935	1957	22 (Note: He played for SC Fives between 1935 and 1944, year when the club merged with Olympique Lillois to form Lille OSC.)		
Song Ju-seok	South Korea	Ulsan Hyundai Horang-i	1990	1999	10	195	
Vladimir Soria	Bolivia	Bolívar	1985	2000	15		
Bruno Soriano	Spain	Villarreal	2006	2020	14	324	
Vadym Sosnykhin	Soviet Union	Dynamo Kyiv	1960	1973	13	291	
Hélio Sousa	Portugal	Vitória de Setúbal	1987	2005	18		
Frangiskos Sourpis	Greece	Panathinaikos	1962	1973	11	310	
Arnold Sowinski	France	Lens	1952	1966	14	126	
Jürgen Sparwasser	East Germany	1. FC Magdeburg	1966	1979	13	298	
Howard Spencer	England	Aston Villa	1894	1907	15	258	
Eddie Spicer	England	Liverpool	1939	1954	15	168	
Zeki Rıza Sporel	Turkey	Fenerbahçe	1916	1934	18		
Roy Sproson	England	Port Vale	1950	1972	22	760	
Miran Srebrnič	Slovenia	Gorica	1993	2007	14	398	
Dirk Stahmann	Germany	1. FC Magdeburg	1978	1994	16	328	
Andreas Stamatiadis	Greece	AEK Athens	1950	1969	19	267	
Constantin Stancu	Romania	Argeș Pitești	1976	1990	14	447	
Roland Stemmler	East Germany	Sachsenring Zwickau	1967	1983	16	292	
Tom Stenvoll	Norway	Stabæk	1998	2010	12	206	
Keith Stevens	England	Millwall	1981	1998	17	462	
George Stevenson	Scotland	Motherwell	1923	1939	16	510	
Ron Stitfall	Wales	Cardiff City	1947	1964	17	398	
Hermann Stöcker	East Germany	1. FC Magdeburg	1956	1969	13		
Georgi Stoychev	Bulgaria	Vidima-Rakovski	1996	2015	19	294	
Trond Strande	Norway	Molde	1991	2007	16	275	
Heinz Strehl	West Germany	1. FC Nürnberg	1958	1970	12	300	
Eduard Streltsov	Soviet Union	Torpedo Moscow	1954	1970	16		
Orlando Strinati	Italy	Ternana	1937	1954	17		
Francisco Stromp	Portugal	Sporting CP	1908	1924	16	107	
Brian Stubbs	England	Notts County	1968	1980	12		
Paul Sturrock	Scotland	Dundee United	1974	1989	15	384	
Ahmad Al Subaih	Kuwait	Kuwait	2003	2014	11		
Albert Sukop	Germany	Eintracht Braunschweig	1930	1948	18		
Wael Sulaiman	Kuwait	Al-Jahra	1980	1999	18		
Mohammed Al-Sulaiti	Qatar	Al-Wakrah	2002	2018	16	132	
Humood Sultan	Bahrain	Muharraq Club	1974	1998	24		
Davaghan Surendran	Malaysia	Selangor	1999	2011	12		
Yussef Al-Suwayed	Kuwait	Kazma	1975	1992	16		
Hideto Suzuki	Japan	Júbilo Iwata	1993	2009	16	329	
Keita Suzuki	Japan	Urawa Red Diamonds	2000	2015	15	368	
Anton Švajlen	Slovakia	FC VSS Košice	1959	1974	15	319	
David Svensson	Sweden	Falkenbergs FF	2003	2017	14	413	
Henning Svensson	Sweden	IFK Göteborg	1908	1925	17	160	
Sven-Ove Svensson	Sweden	Helsingborg	1947	1958	11		
Sjaak Swart	Netherlands	Ajax	1956	1973	17	461	
Leandros Symeonidis	Greece	PAOK	1954	1969	15	213	
Władysław Szczepaniak	Poland	Polonia Warsaw	1926	1946	20	172	
Fritz Szepan	Germany	Schalke 04	1925	1950	25	265	
Zsolt Szilágyi	Romania	Universitatea Cluj	1998	2014	16	187	
Ferenc Szusza	Hungary	Újpest	1941	1960	19	462	
Jeris Tadrus	Jordan	Al-Faisaly	1989	2004	15		
Adnan Al-Talyani	United Arab Emirates	Al-Shaab	1981	2000	19	232	
Jan Arne Tangen	Norway	Strømmen	1946	1961	15	139	
Chitipat Tanklang	Thailand	Buriram United	2012	2024	12	168	
Mehmet Ali Tanman	Turkey	Beşiktaş	1932	1947	15	255	
Tao Wei	China	Beijing Guoan	1998	2010	12	270	
Staffan Tapper	Sweden	Malmö FF	1968	1979	11	220	
Mihai Țârlea	Romania	UTA Arad	1957	1968	11	206	
Stuart Taylor	England	Bristol Rovers	1965	1980	15	546	
Russell Teibert	Canada	Vancouver Whitecaps FC	2010	2023	13	251	
Teixeirinha	Brazil	São Paulo	1939	1956	18	525	
Bobby Templeton	Scotland	Hibernian	1911	1927	16	234	
Nawaf Al-Temyat	Saudi Arabia	Al Hilal	1993	2008	15		
Tensi	Spain	Oviedo	1965	1978	13	354	
Shuhei Terada	Japan	Kawasaki Frontale	1999	2010	11	191	
Frank Terletzki	East Germany	Berliner Dynamo	1969	1986	17	373	
Jean-Claude Terrasse	France	Montpellier	1963	1977	14	208	
Hans Tetzner	Netherlands	Be Quick 1887	1915	1926	11		
Tarek Thabet	Tunisia	Espérance	1990	2004	14		
Pascal Théault	France	Caen	1974	1986	12	227	
Henry Thillberg	Sweden	Malmö FF	1951	1962	11	177	
Johnny Thio	Belgium	Club Brugge	1963	1975	12	291	
Alex Thoirs	Scotland	Huntly	2011	2025	14	235	
Edouard Thomas	France	Troyes	1989	2002	13		
Alexander Thomson	Scotland	Airdrieonians	1899	1917	18	459	
David Thomson	Scotland	Dundee	1913	1927	14	350	
Gunnar Thoresen	Norway	Larvik Turn	1937	1962	25	261	
Willie Thornton	Scotland	Rangers	1936	1954	18	219	
Søren Thorst	Denmark	AaB	1983	1996	13	371	
Edward Threlfall	England	Blackpool	1900	1911	11	320	
Yousuf Al-Thunayan	Saudi Arabia	Al Hilal	1984	2005	21		
Chris Tierney	United States	New England Revolution	2008	2018	10	245	
Bertil Tinglöf	Sweden	Degerfors IF	1948	1963	15		
Fred Tilson	England	Manchester City	1928	1939	11	264	
Giuseppe Tinaglia	Italy	Palermo	1932	1943	11		
Evald Tipner	Estonia	Tallinna Sport	1924	1940	16		
Cătălin Tofan	Romania	Oțelul Galați	1988	2003	15	390	
Muzaffer Tokaç	Turkey	Galatasaray	1942	1955	13	146	
Dick Tol	Netherlands	Volendam	1955	1967	12		
Pepino Toledo	Guatemala	C.S.D. Municipal	1938	1955	17		
Shingo Tomita	Japan	Vegalta Sendai	2005	2022	17	436	
Tonono	Spain	Las Palmas	1962	1975	13	379	
Mihály Tóth	Hungary	Újpest	1944	1963	19	238	
Francesco Totti	Italy	Roma	1992	2017	25	618	
Ramón Trabal	Spain	Espanyol	1922	1933	11	65	
Derek Tracey	Republic of Ireland	Shamrock Rovers	1989	2006	17		
Eberhard Trautner	Germany	VfB Stuttgart	1986	2001	15		
Giuseppe Trivellini	Italy	Brescia	1911	1930	19		
John Trollope	England	Swindon Town	1960	1980	20	770	
Vasili Trofimov	Soviet Union	Dynamo Moscow	1939	1953	14		
Sjaak Troost	Netherlands	Feyenoord	1978	1992	14	325	
Andriy Tsvik	Ukraine	Stal Alchevsk	1987	2005	18	492	
Bert Tulloch	England	Blackpool	1914	1924	10	178	
Eddie Turnbull	Scotland	Hibernian	1946	1959	13	347	
Bert Turner	Wales	Charlton Athletic	1933	1947	14		
Noel Turner	Malta	Sliema Wanderers	1991	2011	20	344	
Gastón Turus	Argentina	Belgrano	1999	2015	16	287	
Raimundo Tupper	Chile	Universidad Católica	1985	1995	10	193	
Ian Twitchin	England	Torquay United	1969	1981	12		
Axel Tyll	East Germany	1. FC Magdeburg	1971	1982	11	233	
Tryfon Tzanetis	Greece	AEK Athens	1933	1950	17		
Hideki Uchidate	Japan	Urawa Red Diamonds	1996	2008	12	220	
Giovanni Udovicich	Italy	Novara	1958	1976	18		
Yoshiharu Ueno	Japan	Yokohama F. Marinos	1994	2007	13	287	
Feyzi Uman	Turkey	Beşiktaş	1929	1944	15	272	
Santos Urdinarán	Uruguay	Nacional	1919	1933	14	318	
Dionisio Urreisti	Spain	Real Sociedad	1962	1976	14	349	
Juan Antonio Ureña	Spain	Real Betis	1986	1999	13	228	
Josu Urrutia	Spain	Athletic Bilbao	1987	2003	16	348	
Ricardo Vaghi	Argentina	River Plate	1935	1949	14	323	
Ayoub Vali	Iran	Foolad	2008	2023	15	213	
Tati Valdés	Spain	Sporting Gijón	1965	1979	14	357	
Jean Van Gool	France	Lille	1954	1968	14	208	
Vavá	Brazil	Cruzeiro	1956	1967	12	428	
Cor Veldhoen	Netherlands	Feyenoord	1956	1970	14	380	
Folkert Velten	Netherlands	Heracles Almelo	1988	1998	10		
Pavel Verbíř	Czech Republic	Teplice	1992	2011	19	407	
Antoon Verlegh	Netherlands	NAC Breda	1912	1931	19		
Viðar Halldórsson	Iceland	FH	1970	1987	17		
Halldór Smari Sigurdsson	Iceland	Vikibngur Reykjavik	2008	2024	16		
Ivo Vieira	Portugal	Nacional	1994	2004	10	206	
Vili Sánchez	Spain	Oviedo	1978	1989	11	304	
Ivan Vinnikov	Russia	KAMAZ	1982	1996	14		
José Luis Violeta	Spain	Zaragoza	1961	1977	16	365	
Patrick Viot	France	Orléans	1970	1991	21		
Jacques Visschers	Netherlands	NAC Breda	1959	1971	12	282	
Bertus Freese	Netherlands	Heracles Almelo	1918	1936	18		
Cor Kools	Netherlands	NAC Breda	1925	1941	16	267	
Berti Vogts	West Germany	Borussia Mönchengladbach	1965	1979	14	419	
Voin Voinov	Bulgaria	Levski Sofia	1971	1981	10	226	
Rüdiger Vollborn	Germany	Bayer Leverkusen	1983	1999	16	401	
Gianfranco Volpato	Italy	Vicenza	1963	1975	12		
Valery Voronin	Soviet Union	Torpedo Moscow	1958	1969	11		
Jan Vreman	Netherlands	De Graafschap	1985	2002	17		
Willie Waddell	Scotland	Rangers	1938	1956	18	201	
Billy Walker	England	Aston Villa	1919	1933	14		
Bobby Walker	Scotland	Hearts	1896	1914	18	328	
Fritz Walter	Germany	1. FC Kaiserslautern	1937	1959	22	364	
Wang Chao	China	Shandong Taishan	1995	2008	13	182	
Wang Jun	China	Tianjin Jinmen Tiger (Note: Wang played for Tianjin Vanke and later Tianjin TEDA, which was formed in 1998 by merger of Tianjin Vanke and Tianjin F.C. after both teams were relegated at the same time in 1997, thus is considered to play at the same club.)	1996	2007	11	141+	
Joe Wark	Scotland	Motherwell	1965	1985	20	469	
Ray Warren	England	Bristol Rovers	1936	1956	20	450	
Petter Wastå	Sweden	Kalmar FF	1994	2012	18	409	
Josser Watling	England	Bristol Rovers	1945	1963	18	323	
Hilmar Weilandt	Germany	Hansa Rostock	1986	2002	16	365	
Hans Weilbächer	Germany	Eintracht Frankfurt	1952	1965	13	241	
Andy Weir	Scotland	Motherwell	1957	1968	11	202	
Phil Weir	Scotland	East Fife	1922	1935	13	404	
Konrad Weise	East Germany	Carl Zeiss Jena	1970	1986	16	310	
Ferdinand Wenauer	West Germany	1. FC Nürnberg	1958	1972	14	403	
Lü Wenjun	China	Shanghai Port	2006	2025	19	398	
Rune Wenzel	Sweden	GAIS	1917	1932	15 (Note: In 1925, Wenzel was loaned to IFK Göteborg for a friendly match against Blackburn Rovers.)		
Selwyn Whalley	England	Port Vale	1953	1966	13	178	
Jimmy Wheeler	England	Reading	1948	1964	16		
Dane Whitehouse	England	Sheffield United	1987	2000	13	231	
Charlie Williams	England	Doncaster Rovers	1948	1959	11	151	
Danny Williams	England	Rotherham United	1943	1960	17	500	
Herbie Williams	Wales	Swansea City	1958	1975	17	513	
Joachim Walter	East Germany	1. FC Magdeburg	1960	1970	10	241	
Tim Williamson	England	Middlesbrough	1902	1923	21	602	
Alex Wilson	Scotland	Portsmouth	1949	1967	18		
Rolf Retschlag	East Germany	1. FC Magdeburg	1961	1972	11	182	
Herbert Wimmer	West Germany	Borussia Mönchengladbach	1966	1978	12		
Freddy Winsth	Sweden	Värnamo	2008	2025	17	378	
Siegfried Wolf	East Germany	Wismut Aue	1950	1964	14	330	
Thomas Wolter	Germany	Werder Bremen	1984	1998	14		
Willie Woodburn	Scotland	Rangers	1938	1955	17	216	
Arthur Woodward	England	Watford	1926	1945	19	391	
Billy Wright	England	Wolverhampton Wanderers	1939	1959	20	490	
Jackie Wright	Scotland	Greenock Morton	1911	1924	13	389	
Tommy Wright	England	Everton	1964	1974	10	373	
Alex Wylie	Scotland	Everton	1890	1901	11	162	
Nobuhisa Yamada	Japan	Urawa Red Diamonds	1994	2014	20	540	
Yang Qipeng	China	Tianjin Tiger	2004	2021	17	106	
Yang Pu	China	Beijing Guoan	1998	2009	11	212	
Diego Yanz	Switzerland	Rapperswil-Jona	2008	2023	15	257	
Jasem Yaqoub	Kuwait	Qadsia	1969	1983	14	142	
Lev Yashin	Soviet Union	Dynamo Moscow	1949	1971	22	326	
Rabie Yassin	Egypt	Al Ahly	1979	1991	12	320	
Ulvi Yenal	Turkey	Galatasaray	1923	1933	10		
Hayrettin Yerlikaya	Turkey	Sivasspor	1999	2013	14	277	
Hakkı Yeten	Turkey	Beşiktaş	1931	1948	17	439	
Müjdat Yetkiner	Turkey	Fenerbahçe	1980	1995	15	429	
Hans-Georg Moldenhauer	East Germany	1. FC Magdeburg	1960	1971	11	134	
Müzdat Yetkiner	Turkey	Fenerbahçe	1942	1955	13		
Yiannakis Yiangoudakis	Cyprus	Apollon	1980	1995	15	195	
Yoo Dong-kwan	South Korea	Pohang Atoms	1986	1995	10	186	
George Young	Scotland	Rangers	1941	1957	16	293	
Yu Genwei	China	Tianjin Jinmen Tiger	1994	2005	11	197	
Eduard Yugrin	Russia	KAMAZ	1986	1998	12	186	
Xu Yunlong	China	Beijing Guoan	1999	2016	17	415	
Francesco Zagatti	Italy	Milan	1951	1963	12	214	
Sándor Zámbó	Hungary	Újpest	1963	1980	17		
Jesús María Zamora	Spain	Real Sociedad	1975	1989	14	455	
Manfred Zapf	East Germany	1. FC Magdeburg	1964	1979	17	327	
Gastone Zanon	Italy	Padova	1944	1957	13		
Zé do Monte	Brazil	Atlético Mineiro	1946	1956	10	320	
Fevzi Zemzem	Turkey	Göztepe	1959	1973	14		
Masoud Zeraei	Qatar	Al-Arabi	1999	2019	20	125	
Zhang Xiaofei	China	Changchun Yatai	2002	2019	17	447	
Magnús Þorvaldsson	Iceland	Víkingur Reykjavík	1972	1986	14		
Zhao Junzhe	China	Liaoning	1998	2016	18	432	
Zhou Yun	China	Jiangsu	2008	2021	13	228	
David Zibung	Switzerland	Luzern	2003	2021	18	392+	
Marcel Ziegl	Austria	Ried	2008	2024	16	307	
Michael Zorc	Germany	Borussia Dortmund	1981	1998	17	463	
Graham Zusi	United States	Sporting Kansas City	2009	2023	15	355	
Đặng Trần Chỉnh	Vietnam	Saigon Port FC	1984	1995	11		
Hà Vương Ngầu Nại	Vietnam	Saigon Port FC	1983	1995	12		
Võ Hoàng Bửu	Vietnam	Saigon Port FC	1988	2005	17	108	
Necip Uysal	Turkey	Beşiktaş	2009	2026	17	337	
Bana Tchanilé	Togo	Sémassi de Sokodé	1977	1989	12		

== Active players ==
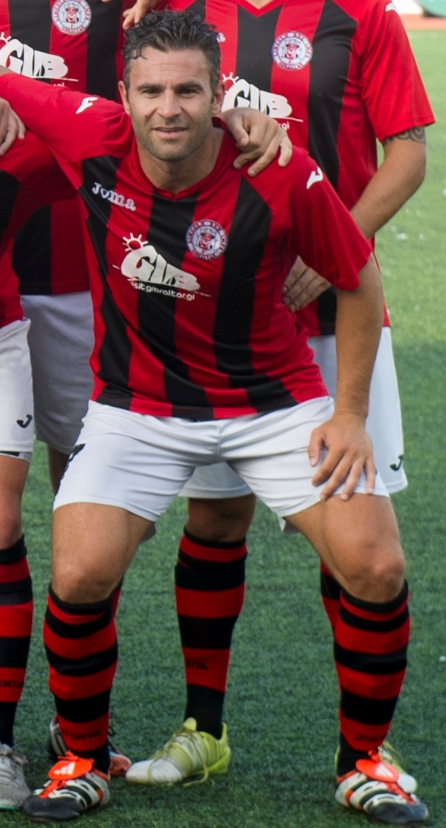
Lee Casciaro has been playing for Lincoln Red Imps since 1998.

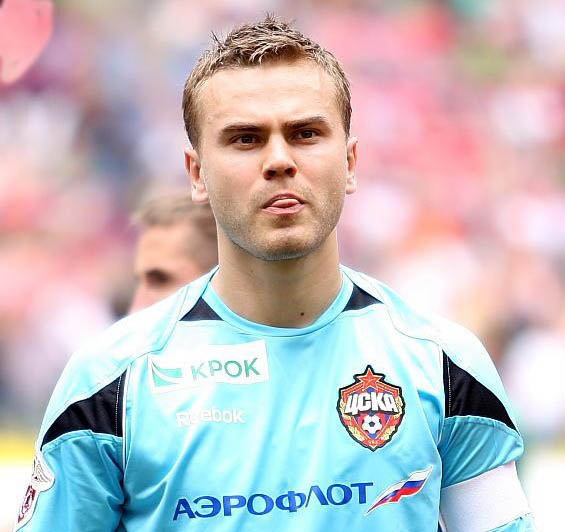
CSKA Moscow captain Igor Akinfeev has appeared in over 800 matches over 22 seasons.

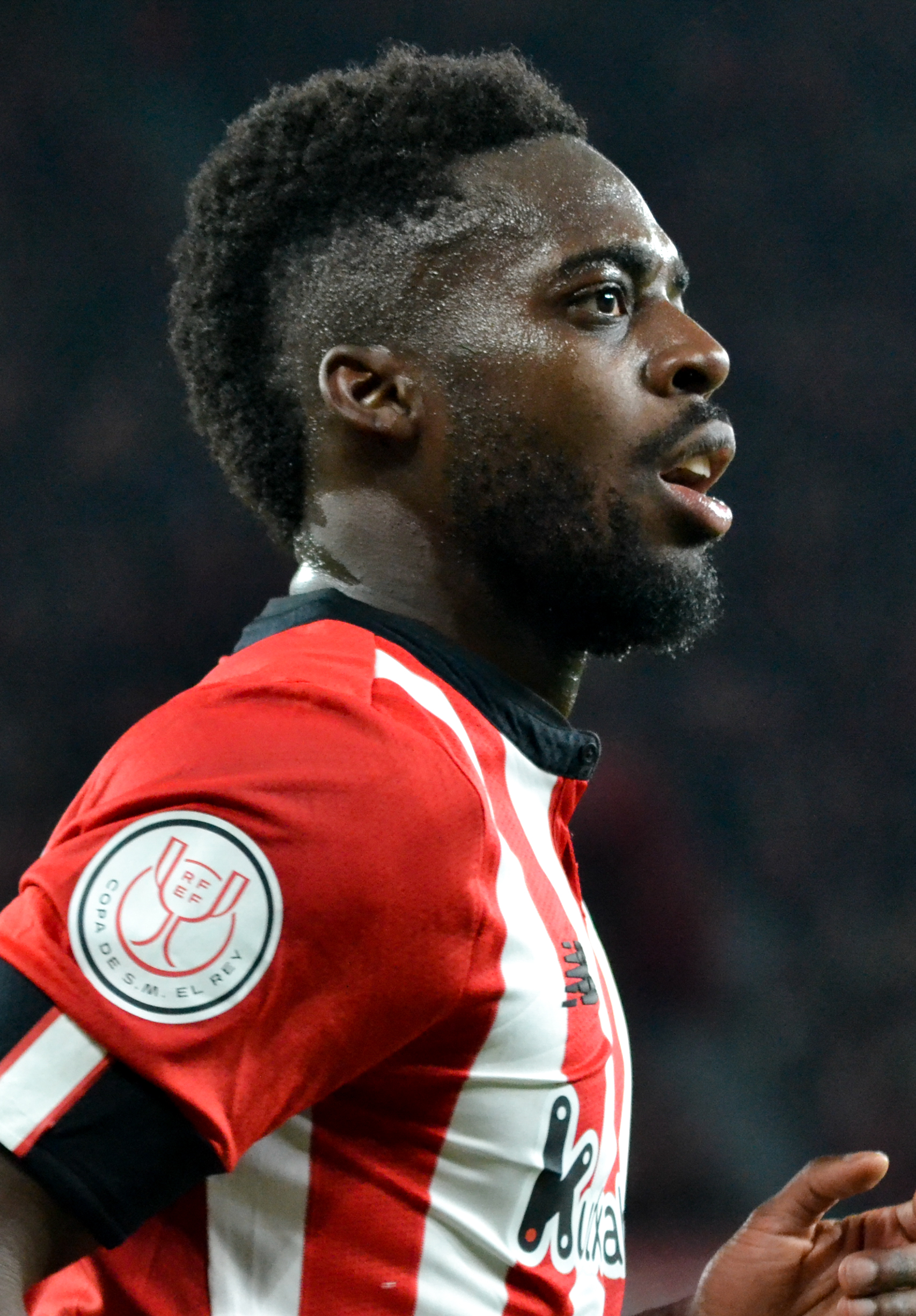
Iñaki Williams of Athletic Bilbao has appeared in more than 500 matches over 10 seasons.

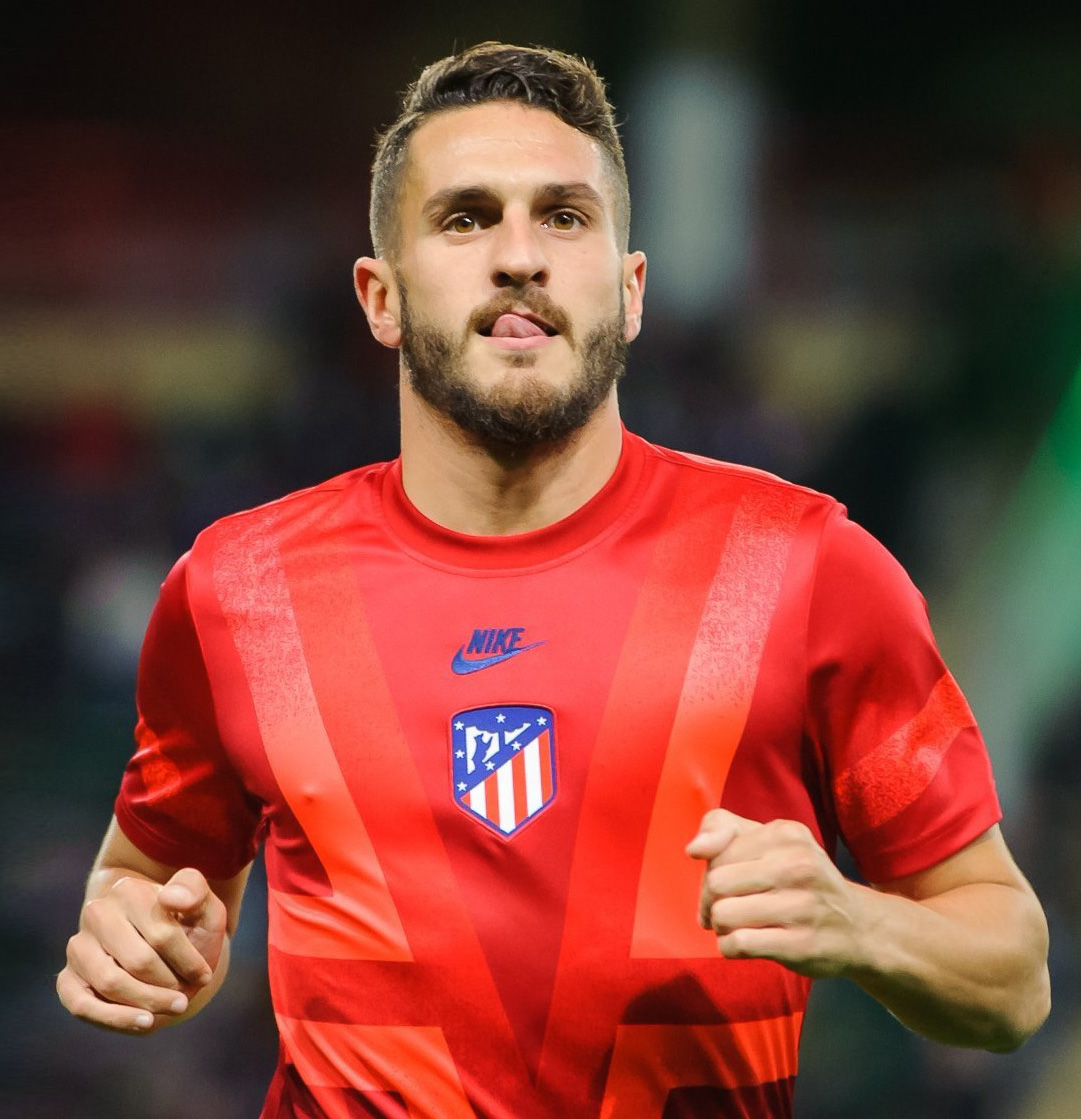
Koke has appeared in more than 700 matches for Atlético Madrid since 2009.

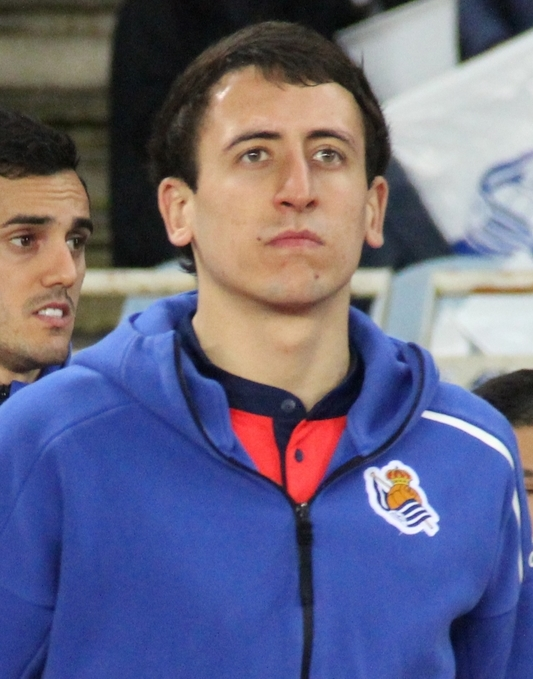
Real Sociedad captain Mikel Oyarzabal has appeared more than 400 matches over 10 seasons.

Active as of 00:00, 30 June 2025 (UTC). Ordered by year started, then games played. Minimum of ten years to qualify; current players who have been at their club since 2016 will be eligible for inclusion in spring 2026.

Name	Nationality	Club	Debut	Span (years)	League apps
Lee Casciaro	Gibraltar	Lincoln Red Imps	1998	27	258
Jamrin Johari	Brunei	Wijaya	2002	24	
Gary Manson	Scotland	Wick Academy	2000	23 (Note: Had not played in the 2020–21, and has not played for the main team since the 2023–24 season.)	702
William West	Scotland	Fraserburgh	2003	22	682
Igor Akinfeev	Russia	CSKA Moscow	2003	22	596
Sølvi Vatnhamar	Faroe Islands	LÍF Leirvík / Víkingur Gøta (Note: LÍF Leirvík has merged with GÍ Gøta to form Víkingur Gøta in 2008.)	2003	23	497
Pak Chol-jin	North Korea	Amrokgang	2003	22	
Ovi Brim	Faroe Islands	B68	2003	10 (Note: Had only played for reserves between 2009 and 2013, in 2016, and has not played for the main team since 2018.)	108
Ángel Pajuelo	Spain	Villanovense	2003	22	401+
Slobodan Lučić	Serbia	Budućnost Dobanovci	2004	21	492+
Purevsuren Jargalsaikhan	Mongolia	Erchim	2004	21	
Sükhbaatar Bayarzayaa	Mongolia	Khangarid	2004	21	
Hisashi Jogo	Japan	Avispa Fukuoka	2005	20	494
Jong Chol-min	North Korea	Rimyongsu	2005	20	
Kim Kyong-il	North Korea	Rimyongsu	2005	20	
Yun Yong-il	North Korea	Wolmido	2005	20	
Bryan Hay	Scotland	Fraserburgh	2006	19	554
Wang Shenchao	China	Shanghai Port	2006	20	457+
Barak Lavi	Israel	Maccabi Herzliya	2006	19	374+
Igor Araújo	Portugal	Sporting da Covilhã	2006	15 (Note: Had only been an unused substitute in the 2017–18, 2018–19, 2021–22 and 2024–25 seasons.)	166
Ri Chol-myong	North Korea	Pyongyang	2006	19	
Jordan Owens	Northern Ireland	Crusaders	2007	18	548
Dávid Kovács	Hungary	Újbuda / Budafoki MTE (Note: Újbuda FC merged with Budafoki MTE in 2013.)	2007	18	486
Guillaume Jannez	France	Concarneau	2007	18	467+
Hassan Al-Haydos	Qatar	Al Sadd	2007	19	347
Jérémy Colin	France	Épinal	2007	16 (Note: Had only played for reserves in the 2007–08 and 2008–09 seasons.) (Note: The amateur season in 2020–21 was not held in France due to the COVID-19 pandemic in France)	291+
Fahad Hamoud	Kuwait	Kuwait SC	2007	18	
Ro Hak-su	North Korea	Rimyongsu	2007	18	
Iván Turrillo	Spain	Algeciras	2008	18	516
Hiroki Miyazawa	Japan	Hokkaido Consadole Sapporo	2008	18	507
Brian Cameron	Scotland	Elgin City	2008	18	497
Manu Olmedilla	Spain	Gimnástica Segoviana	2008	17	475+
Yan Junling	China	Shanghai Port	2008	18	397
Dendi Santoso	Indonesia	Arema	2008	16	316
Stanislav Dostál	Czech Republic	Zlín	2008	15 (Note: Had only played for reserves in the 2009–10 and 2012–13 seasons.)	279
Andrea Paroni	Italy	Virtus Entella	2008	14 (Note: Had only been an unused substitute in the 2021–22, 2022–23 and 2024–25 seasons.)	252
Saad Al Sheeb	Qatar	Al Sadd	2008	17	245
Ri Jun-il	North Korea	Sobaeksu	2008	17	
Milton Molina	El Salvador	Isidro Metapán	2009	17	517+
Koke	Spain	Atlético Madrid	2009	17	488
Chupo	Spain	Gimnástica Segoviana	2009	16	426+
Takumi Yamada	Japan	Montedio Yamagata	2009	17	388
Snir Shoker	Israel	Hapoel Ra'anana	2009	16	356
Rhyan Grant	Australia	Sydney FC	2009	17	316
Andri Rafn Yeoman	Iceland	Breiðablik	2009	17	308
Kyriakos Kyriakou	Cyprus	Othellos Athienou	2009	17	296+
Niklas Bürger	Germany	Victoria Rosport	2009	16	279+
Waleed Al Hayam	Bahrain	Muharraq Club	2009	16	107
Pak Sung-hyok	North Korea	Sobaeksu	2009	16	
Ri Il-jin	North Korea	Sobaeksu	2009	16	
Ri Phyong-chol	North Korea	Pyongyang	2009	16	
Lars-Christopher Vilsvik	Norway	Strømsgodset	2010	16	402
Geoffrey Franzoni	France	Differdange 03	2010	15	371
Bjorn Kristensen	Malta	Hibernians	2010	15	352
Takuma Arano	Japan	Hokkaido Consadole Sapporo	2010	13	344
Zheng Zheng	China	Shandong Taishan	2010	16	337
James Forrest	Scotland	Celtic	2010	16	336
Karim Boudiaf	Qatar	Al-Duhail	2010	15	272
Ross Allan	Scotland	Wick Academy	2010	13	265
Wang Tong	China	Shandong Taishan	2010	13	255
Skerdian Perja	Albania	Besa Kavajë	2010	15	218
Andrea Deidda	Luxembourg	Jeunesse Esch	2010	14 (Note: Has not played since the 2023–24 season due to an injury.)	210
Ali Assadalla	Qatar	Al Sadd	2010	14 (Note: Had not played for the main team in the 2010–11 and 2011–12 seasons.)	204
Ali Salim Al-Nahar	Oman	Dhofar	2010	15	
Sami Al-Sanea	Kuwait	Kuwait SC	2010	15	
Davaajav Battör	Mongolia	Erchim	2010	15	
Ri Hyong-jin	North Korea	25 April	2010	15	
Maximilian Arnold	Germany	VfL Wolfsburg	2011	14	379
Kaarel Tinn	Estonia	Elva	2011	15	350
Teitur Gestsson	Faroe Islands	HB	2011	14	343
Kieran Mills-Evans	Wales	Newtown	2011	13	316
Ulrik Saltnes	Norway	Bodø/Glimt	2011	15	289
Simon Scherder	Germany	Preußen Münster	2011	11 (Note: Missed the entire 2015–16 and 2016–17 seasons due to injuries.)	277
Thibault Sinquin	France	Concarneau	2011	14	275
Ryota Oshima	Japan	Kawasaki Frontale	2011	15	267
Bryan Gomes	Portugal	Rumelange	2011	14	261
Ásgeir Eyþórsson	Iceland	Fylkir	2011	15	237
Jonathan Witt	Denmark	Hillerød F	2011	14	226+
Wahyu Subo Seto	Indonesia	Bhayangkara	2011	14 (Note: Missed the entire 2020 season (which consisted of only three games due to the COVID-19 pandemic in Indonesia))	220
Alan Hughes	Scotland	Wick Academy	2011	15	209
Shahin Abdulrahman	United Arab Emirates	Sharjah	2011	14	199
Mykola Lykhovydov	Ukraine	Real Pharma Odesa	2011	14	192
Sølvi Egilsson	Faroe Islands	07 Vestur	2011	11 (Note: Had only played for reserves in 2013, and has not played for the main team since 2022.)	179
Rasyid Bakri	Indonesia	PSM Makassar	2011	14	170
Mehran Golzari	Iran	Gol Gohar	2011	14	154+
Nkosingiphile Gumede	South Africa	Golden Arrows	2011	10 (Note: Had only been an unused substitute in the 2020–21, 2023–24 and 2024–25 seasons.)	118
Om Chol-song	North Korea	25 April	2011	14	
Altansükhiin Erdenebayar	Mongolia	Khangarid	2011	14	
Mönkhbaataryn Altankhüü	Mongolia	Khangarid	2011	14	
Bekhbatyn Ganbat	Mongolia	Ulaanbaataryn Unaganuud	2011	14	
Olzvoin Ochbayar	Mongolia	Ulaanbaataryn Unaganuud	2011	14	
Oyuunbatyn Bayarjargal	Mongolia	Ulaanbaatar FC	2011	14	
Domenico Berardi	Italy	Sassuolo	2012	13	380
Christian Günter	Germany	Freiburg	2012	13	377
Ross McGeachie	Scotland	Stirling Albion	2012	13	356
Simon Johansson	Sweden	Västerås	2012	14	330
Celal Dumanlı	Turkey	Bodrum F.K.	2012	13	317
José Gayà	Spain	Valencia	2012	13	311
Artjom Škinjov	Estonia	Narva Trans	2012	14	306
Andrés Camacho	Argentina	Flandria	2012	12	303
Stian Nygard	Norway	Åsane	2012	14	297
Astrit Hysenllari	Albania	Pogradeci	2012	13	278
Shunta Nishiyama	Japan	YSCC Yokohama	2012	14	264
Benjamin Heinesen	Faroe Islands	B36 Tórshavn	2012	14	240
Liu Binbin	China	Shandong Taishan	2012	14	237
Raphaël Delvigne	France	Fréjus Saint-Raphaël	2012	14	231
Ahmed Shambih	United Arab Emirates	Al-Nasr	2012	14	225
Ahmed Fathy	Qatar	Al-Arabi	2012	14	222
Tom Ben Zaken	Israel	Ashdod	2012	13 (Note: Had not played in the 2013–14 season.)	209
Thomas Rotter	Austria	TSV Hartberg	2012	12 (Note: Has not played for the main team since the 2023–24 season.)	200
Hou Sen	China	Beijing Guoan	2012	12 (Note: Had only been an unused substitute in the 2014 and 2015 seasons.)	127
Bilgüün Ganbold	Mongolia	Erchim	2012	13	
Daniel Paulson	Sweden	Örgryte	2013	13	309
Tomáš Staš	Slovakia	Liptovský Mikuláš	2013	13	302
Daniel Mikic	Germany	Verl	2013	12	300
Jordan Marié	France	Dijon	2013	13	293
Liran Serdal	Israel	Hapoel Haifa	2013	12	292
Miloš Todorović	Luxembourg	Jeunesse Esch	2013	13	285
Clément Bassin	France	Rouen	2013	12	274
Luís Farinha	Portugal	Caldas	2013	12	274
Jurgen Degabriele	Malta	Hibernians	2013	12	272
Denis Rakhmanov	Russia	Volga Ulyanovsk	2013	12 (Note: Had only played for reserves in the 2013–14 season.)	261
Bartal Wardum	Faroe Islands	HB	2013	13	243
Alyaksandr Yemelyanaw	Belarus	Asipovichy	2013	13	243
Ryan Cassar	Malta	Naxxar Lions	2013	12	241
Ross Matthews	Scotland	Raith Rovers	2013	12	241
Dmitry Rakhmanov	Russia	Volga Ulyanovsk	2013	12	241
Nazariy Fedorivskyi	Ukraine	Obolon Kyiv	2013	12	216
Daniel Itodo	Nigeria	Plateau United	2013	13	215+
Oleh Slobodyan	Ukraine	Obolon Kyiv	2013	12	208
Loizos Kosmas	Cyprus	Enosis Neon Paralimni	2013	13	194
Đặng Anh Tuấn	Vietnam	SHB Da Nang	2013	13	179
Benjamin Brélivet	France	Les Herbiers	2013	12 (Note: Had only played for reserves in the 2017–18 season.)	169
Abdullah Ghanem	United Arab Emirates	Sharjah	2013	12	167
Andriy Lykhovydov	Ukraine	Real Pharma Odesa	2013	12	165
Khaled Mahmoudi	Qatar	Qatar	2013	12	155
Maher Sabra	Lebanon	Nejmeh	2013	12	144
Daði Ólafsson	Iceland	Fylkir	2013	11 (Note: Had not played in 2023.)	123
Mohamed Hedi Gaaloul	Tunisia	CS Sfaxien	2013	11 (Note: Had only been an unused substitute in the 2015–16 season.)	47
Gankhuyag Serodyanjiv	Mongolia	Khangarid	2013	12	
Iñaki Williams	Ghana	Athletic Bilbao	2014	11	377
Blair Carswell	Scotland	The Spartans	2014	12	307
Lyndon Kane	Northern Ireland	Coleraine	2014	11	285
Grzegorz Drazik	Poland	GKS Jastrzębie	2014	11	258
Jákup Andreasen	Faroe Islands	KÍ	2014	12	230
Thomas Castella	Switzerland	Lausanne-Sport	2014	11	229
Hugo Boudin	France	Stade Briochin	2014	11	227
Lex Nicolay	Luxembourg	Etzella Ettelbruck	2014	11	213
Elmar Atli Garðarsson	Iceland	BÍ/Bolungarvík/Vestri (Note: BÍ/Bolungarvík merged into Vestri in 2016.)	2014	12	194
David Soares	Luxembourg	Jeunesse Esch	2014	11	185
Tögöldur Galt	Mongolia	Erchim	2014	11	
Mikel Oyarzabal	Spain	Real Sociedad	2015	10	315
Nuno Januário	Portugal	Caldas	2015	10	232
Ricky Fajrin	Indonesia	Bali United	2015	10	222
Bence Lenzsér	Hungary	Paks	2015	11	221
Asker Delok	Russia	Druzhba Maykop	2015	11	219
Iñigo Lekue	Spain	Athletic Bilbao	2015	11	208
Cristian Roldan	United States	Seattle Sounders FC	2015	11	310
Suhail Al-Noubi	United Arab Emirates	Baniyas	2015	11	194
Erlingur Agnarsson	Iceland	Víkingur Reykjavík	2015	11	169
Julien Mouillon	France	Fréjus Saint-Raphaël	2015	11	162
Dávid Banai	Hungary	Újpest	2015	11	131
Tun Rauen	Luxembourg	Jeunesse Canach	2015	10	116

== Playing and post-playing careers ==
In addition to those who spent their entire playing career with a single club, there are several examples of players remaining with a single club throughout their entire career within the professional club game – playing, coaching, and management. Notable examples are listed below.

- Jakob Ahlmann (AaB): player 2009–2024; scout 2024–present.
- Ilshat Aitkulov (Orenburg): player 1990–2003; assistant 2003–2005 and 2020–present; manager 2005; caretaker 2006, 2009, 2011, 2020 and 2024.
- Michael Anhaeuser (Charleston Battery): player 1994–1998; coach 1999–2021.
- Joe Bacuzzi (Fulham): player 1935–1956; reserve team coach 1956–1965.
- Franco Baresi (AC Milan): player 1977–1997; youth team coach 2002–2008; marketing board 2008–2017; brand ambassador 2017–2020; honorary vice-president 2020–2026.
- Şeref Bey (Beşiktaş): manager 1911–1925.
- Edmund Białas (Lech Poznań): player 1934–1951; manager 1956–1976 with intervals.
- Fred Blankemeijer (Feyenoord): player 1942–1952, technical director, board member, youth coach and scout 1940–2010.
- Giampiero Boniperti (Juventus): player 1946–1961; board member 1962–1971; club president 1971–1990; CEO 1991–1994; club honorary president 2006–2021 (his death).
- George Bray (Burnley): player 1937–1952; coach 1952–1974; kit manager 1974–1992.
- Ross Caven (Queen's Park): player 1982–2002; director 2001–present.
- Volodymyr Chesnakov (Vorskla Poltava): player 2007–2024; assistant manager 2024.
- Cosme Damião (Benfica): football player 1904–1916 (main squad 1907–1916); field hockey player; manager 1908–1926 (player-coach 1908–1916); director of the club's sports newspaper 1913–1931; stage director of the club's theatrical group (1916); president of the club's General Assembly 1931–1935.
- Romain Danzé (Rennes): player 2006–2019; youth-team assistant 2019; public relations and development director 2020–present.
- René Domingo (Saint-Étienne): player 1949–1964, reserve team coach 1964–1968.
- Stig Ekman (Degerfors IF): player 1963–1969, coaching staff 1993–present.
- Agustín Gaínza (Athletic Bilbao): player 1940–1959; reserve coach 1964–1965; head coach 1965–1968.
- Boris Gavrilov (Shinnik Yaroslavl): player 1971–1989; assistant manager 1989–1992.
- John Greig (Rangers): player 1961–1978; manager 1978–1983; public relations manager 1990–1998; youth development coach 1998–2001; director 2003–2011; honorary life president 2015–present.
- Les Hart (Bury): player 1936–1953; Coach/Physio 1954–1968; Manager 1969–1971; Physio 1972–1980.
- Patrick Herrmann (Borussia Mönchengladbach): player 2010–2024; sponsors manager 2024–present.
- Eddie Hunter (Queen's Park): player 1964–1974; coach 1974–1979; manager 1979–1994.
- Anatoly Ilyin (Spartak Moscow): player 1949–1962; youth coach 1962–1995.
- Tony Jantschke (Borussia Mönchengladbach): player 2008–2024; youth-team assistant 2024–present.
- Aage Rou Jensen (AGF): player 1941–1962; handball player; tennis player; gymnastic and swimming at AGF; manager 1963; president 1964–1967.
- Dragan Jovanović (SK Jugoslavija): player 1921–1929, coach 1929–1933.
- Ledley King (Tottenham Hotspur): player 1999–2012; ambassador 2012–present; assistant first team coach 2020–2021.
- Kolec Kraja (Partizani): player 1956–1964; coach 1988–1989.
- Nat Lofthouse (Bolton Wanderers): player 1939–1960; assistant coach 1961–1967; chief coach 1967; manager 1968–1971 and 1985; administrative manager; chief scout; executive manager 1978–1985; club president 1986–2011 (his death).
- Mykola Lykhovydov (Real Pharma Odesa): president since 2000; player since 2000 (professionally since 2011); manager 2000–2003, 2009–2012, 2016–2017 and 2019–2020.
- Paolo Maldini (AC Milan): player 1984–2009; sporting strategy and development director 2018–2019; technical director 2019–2023.
- Donnie McKinnon (Partick Thistle): player 1959–1973, coach/physiotherapist 1973–1989.
- Willie Miller (Aberdeen): player 1972–1990; coach 1990–1992; manager 1992–1995; director of football 2004–2012.
- Bill Nicholson (Tottenham Hotspur): player 1938–1955; manager 1958–1974.
- Kenneth Ohlsson (Hammarby IF): player 1966–1983; coach 1989–1992.
- Bob Paisley (Liverpool): player 1939–1954; coach/physiotherapist 1954–1959; assistant manager 1959–1974; manager 1974–1983.
- Jean Petit (Monaco): player 1969–1982; assistant coach 1987–1994; coach 1994; assistant coach 1994–2005; coach 2005; assistant coach 2011–2014.
- Steinar Pettersen (Strømsgodset IF): player 1962–1975; bandy player during 60s; coach 1979.
- Louis Provelli (Valenciennes-Anzin): player 1957–1970; coach 1970.
- Carles Puyol (Barcelona): player 1999–2014; assistant director of football 2014–2015.
- Johan Radet (Auxerre): player 1996–2007; third-team coach 2011–2012; reserve coach 2012–2013; youth-team coach 2013–2014; reserve coach 2014–2016.
- Roman Rogocz (Lechia Gdańsk): player 1947–1962; manager and youth team manager 1962–1975 with intervals.
- Hussein Saeed (Al-Talaba): player 1975–1990; manager 1992; vice-president 1985–1992.
- Joseph Saliba (Qormi): player 1992–2011, technical staff 2021.
- Süleyman Seba (Beşiktaş): player 1946–1953; director 1963–1984; club president 1984–2000; honorary chairman 2000–2014 (his death).
- Nicolas Seube (Caen): player 2001–2017; youth-team assistant 2017–2019; reserve assistant 2019–2020; youth-team coach 2020–2022; formation director 2021–present; reserve coach 2022–2023; coach 2023–2024.
- Éric Sikora (Lens): player 1985–2004; coach assistant 2005–2006; youth-team coach 2006–2012; assistant coach 2012; coach 2012–2013; reserve team coach 2013–2017; coach 2017–2018; youth-team coach 2021–2022; head post-training formation 2022–present; assistant manager 2025–present.
- Vadym Sosnykhin (Dynamo Kyiv): player 1960–1973; youth-team coach 1974–1991; veterans team director 1992–2003 (his death).
- Arnold Sowinski (Lens) : player 1952–1966; coach 1969–1978, 1979–1981, 1988, 1989.
- Roy Sproson (Port Vale): player 1949–1972 and manager 1974–1977.
- George Stevenson (Motherwell): player 1923–1939; manager 1946–1955.
- Lajos Tichy (Budapest Honvéd): player 1953–1971; manager 1976–1982.
- Francesco Totti (A.S. Roma): player 1993–2017; technical director 2017–2019.
- Andriy Tsvik (Stal Alchevsk): player 1987–2005; reserves coach 2005–2007; assistant manager 2007–2015.
- Josu Urrutia (Athletic Bilbao): player 1987–2003; club president 2011–2018.
- Antoon Verlegh (NAC Breda): player 1912–1931; manager, chairman, chairman of honour 1931–1960.
- Heinz Wewers (Rot-Weiss Essen): player 1949–1962; runner of stadium pub 1957–approx.1962; manager 1967.
- John Stewart Wright (Greenock Morton): player 1911–1924; manager 1927–1929 and 1934–1939.
- Lev Yashin (Dynamo Moscow): player 1949–1971; club administration 1971–1990.
- Ali Sami Yen (Galatasaray): player 1905–1909; manager 1916–1917; club president 1905–1918 and 1925.
- Hakkı Yeten (Beşiktaş): player 1931–1948; manager 1949 and 1950–1951; club president 1960–1963, 1964–1966 and 1967–1968.
- Francesco Zagatti (AC Milan): player 1951–1963; youth team coach 1963–1982; caretaker 1982; club scout 1982–2002.
- Michael Zorc (Borussia Dortmund): player 1981–1998; general manager of football 1998–2022.

== See also ==
- List of National Football League players who spent their entire career with one franchise
- List of Major League Baseball players who spent their entire career with one franchise
- List of NBA players who have spent their entire career with one franchise
- List of NHL players who spent their entire career with one franchise
- List of men's footballers with 1,000 or more official appearances
- List of one-club men in rugby league
- One Club Award (Athletic Bilbao)
