= Mönkhbaataryn Altankhüü =

Mongolian footballer

Altankhuu Munkhbaatar
Personal information
- Full name: Altankhuu Munkhbaatar Мөнхбаатарын Алтанхүү
- Date of birth: 11.09.1989
- Place of birth: Mongolia
- Height: 1.76 m (5 ft 9 in)
- Position: Defender

Team information
- Current team: Udriin Od FC, Cowboys FC, Selenge press FC, FC Ulaanbaatar, Ulaanbaatar city FC,
- Number: 3

Senior career*
Years	Team	Apps	(Gls)
2011	Udriin Od fc	7	(8)

International career
2009 2010 2011 2014 2016 2017 2018	Mongolia	3	(0)
- * Club domestic league appearances and goals

Mönkhbaataryn Altankhüü (Mongolian: Мөнхбаатарын Алтанхүү) is a Mongolian international footballer. He made his first appearance for the Mongolia national football team in 2011.
