= Nawaf Al Shuwaye =

Kuwaiti footballer

Personal information
- Full name: Nawaf Fahad Al Shuwaye (Arabic:نواف فهد الشويع)
- Date of birth: August 3, 1983 (age 43)
- Place of birth: Kuwait City, Kuwait
- Height: 1.86 m (6 ft 1 in)
- Position: Defensive midfielder

Youth career
- 1995–2003: Al Arabi

Senior career*
Years	Team	Apps	(Gls)
2003–2015	Al Arabi		

International career^{‡}
2004–2005	Kuwait	9	(0)
- * Club domestic league appearances and goals as of October 13, 2010 ‡ National team caps and goals as of October 13, 2010

Nawaf Al Shuwaye (Arabic: نواف الشويع, (born 3 August 1983) is a Kuwaiti footballer who is a defensive midfielder for the Kuwaiti Premier League club Al Arabi.
