= Paul Simeoni =

French footballer (born 1938)

Personal information
- Date of birth: 19 March 1938 (age 87)
- Place of birth: France
- Height: 1.77 m (5 ft 10 in)
- Position(s): Goalkeeper

Senior career*
Years	Team	Apps	(Gls)
1959–1969	Cannes	165	(0)
- *Club domestic league appearances and goals

Paul Simeoni (born 19 March 1938) is a French former professional footballer who played as a goalkeeper. He spent the entirety of his ten-year career at Cannes, where he made 165 league appearances, including five in the Division 1.
