= 1962–63 Galatasaray S.K. season =

Galatasaray
1962–63 season
- President: (Turkey) Ulvi Yenal
- Manager: (Turkey) Gündüz Kılıç
- Stadium: Mithatpaşa Stadi
- Milli Lig: 1st
- Türkiye Kupası: Winner
- European Cup: Quarter Final
- Top goalscorer: League: Metin Oktay (38); All: Metin Oktay (47)
- Highest home attendance: 38,662 vs Fenerbahçe SK (Milli Lig, 24 April 1963)
- Lowest home attendance: 4,249 vs Karşıyaka SK (Türkiye Kupası, 26 December 1962)
- Average home league attendance: 16,951
Home colours	Away colours	Third colours

The 1962–63 season was Galatasaray's 59th in existence and the 5th consecutive season in the 1. Lig. This article shows statistics of the club's players in the season, and also lists all matches that the club have played in the season.

== Squad statistics ==
No.	Pos.	Name	Milli Lig		Türkiye Kupası		CL		Total	
No.	Pos.	Name	Apps	Goals	Apps	Goals	Apps	Goals	Apps	Goals
1	GK	(Turkey) Turgay Şeren(C)	22	0	7	0	6	0	35	0
-	GK	(Turkey) Altay Yavuzarslan	4	0	0	0	0	0	4	0
-	GK	(Turkey) Bülent Gürbüz	16	0	1	0	0	0	17	0
-	DF	(Turkey) Candemir Berkman	37	0	7	0	6	0	50	0
-	DF	(Turkey) Ahmet Karlıklı	27	0	5	0	0	0	32	0
-	MF	(Turkey) Suat Mamat	30	3	7	2	6	1	43	6
-	MF	(Turkey) Bahri Altıntabak	14	2	5	3	0	0	19	5
-	MF	(Turkey) Talat Özkarslı	30	4	6	0	5	0	41	4
-	MF	(Turkey) Erol Boralı	4	0	1	0	0	0	5	0
-	DF	(Turkey) Ergun Ercins	18	0	2	0	6	0	26	0
-	DF	(Turkey) Turan Doğangün	7	1	0	0	0	0	7	1
-	MF	(Turkey) Mustafa Yürür	22	3	5	2	6	0	33	5
-	FW	(Turkey) Ahmet Berman	36	2	7	1	6	0	49	3
-	FW	(Turkey) Ayhan Elmastaşoğlu	13	8	1	0	1	0	15	8
-	FW	(Turkey) Erdoğan Gökçen	3	0	0	0	0	0	3	0
-	FW	(Turkey) Uğur Köken	34	8	7	3	6	2	47	13
-	FW	(Turkey) Erol Yanık	7	0	0	0	0	0	7	0
-	FW	(Turkey) İlhan Geliş	7	0	0	0	0	0	7	0
-	FW	(Turkey) Tarık Kutver	40	17	7	9	6	1	53	27
-	FW	(Turkey) Nuri Asan	10	1	2	1	0	0	12	2
-	FW	(Turkey) İbrahim Ünal	16	5	3	0	0	0	19	5
-	FW	(Turkey) Kadri Aytaç	39	9	8	2	6	0	53	11
10	FW	(Turkey) Metin Oktay	26	38	7	4	6	5	39	47

=== Players in / out ===
==== In ====
Pos.	Nat.	Name	Age	Moving from
FW	(Turkey)	Metin Oktay	26	U.S. Città di Palermo
FW	(Turkey)	Kadri Aytaç	31	Fenerbahçe SK
FW	(Turkey)	Tarık Kutver	22	Fatih Karagümrük SK
MF	(Turkey)	Turan Doğangün	21	Galatasaray SK A2
GK	(Turkey)	Altay Yavuzarslan	20	Vefsa SK

==== Out ====
Pos.	Nat.	Name	Age	Moving to
FW	(Turkey)	Recep Adanır	33	Fatih Karagümrük SK
FW	(Turkey)	Selçuk Hergül	20	Fatih Karagümrük SK

== Milli Lig ==
=== Standings ===
==== Red group ====
Pos	Team	Pld	W	D	L	GF	GA	GR	Pts	Qualification or relegation
1	Galatasaray	20	14	4	2	51	21	2.429	32	Qualification to Championship group
2	Gençlerbirliği	20	12	2	6	34	22	1.545	26	Qualification to Championship group
3	Karşıyaka	20	10	4	6	22	19	1.158	24	Qualification to Championship group
4	Ankara Demirspor	20	9	5	6	38	26	1.462	23	Qualification to Championship group
5	Beykoz	20	8	5	7	18	23	0.783	21	Qualification to Championship group
6	Altay	20	8	4	8	25	24	1.042	20	Qualification to Championship group
7	Göztepe	20	8	3	9	27	25	1.080	19	Qualification to Classification group
8	Beyoğluspor	20	8	3	9	23	32	0.719	19	Qualification to Classification group
9	Feriköy	20	6	2	12	19	22	0.864	14	Qualification to Classification group
10	Karagümrük (R)	20	4	4	12	20	32	0.625	12	Relegation to Turkish Second Football League
11	Şeker Hilal (R)	20	2	6	12	25	56	0.446	10	Relegation to Turkish Second Football League

Rules for classification: 1. Points 2. Goal ratio
(R) Relegated

==== Final league table ====
Pos	Team	Pld	W	D	L	GF	GA	GR	Pts	Qualification
1	Galatasaray (C)	22	14	7	1	54	14	3.857	35	Qualification to European Cup preliminary round
2	Beşiktaş	22	14	6	2	45	12	3.750	34	
3	Fenerbahçe	22	11	6	5	33	19	1.737	28	Qualification to Cup Winners' Cup first round
4	Altay	22	8	8	6	23	25	0.920	24	Invitation to Inter-Cities Fairs Cup first round
5	İstanbulspor	22	7	9	6	29	27	1.074	23	
6	Gençlerbirliği	22	5	11	6	32	30	1.067	21	
7	Hacettepe	22	8	4	10	34	41	0.829	20	
8	İzmirspor	22	7	6	9	27	38	0.711	20	
9	Beykoz	22	5	8	9	25	28	0.893	18	
10	Ankara Demirspor	22	6	6	10	34	41	0.829	18	
11	Karşıyaka	22	3	7	12	26	57	0.456	13	
12	Kasımpaşa	22	2	6	14	17	47	0.362	10	

Rules for classification: 1. Points 2. Goal ratio
(C) Champions

=== Matches ===
Kick-off listed in local time (EET)

22 September 1962 1	Göztepe SK	0–1	Galatasaray SK	İzmir
17:00 EET		(Report)	Metin Oktay 73'	Stadium: Alsancak Stadium; Attendance: 9,954; Referee: Cezmi Başar

23 September 1962 2	Karşıyaka SK	1–1	Galatasaray SK	İzmir
17:00 EET	Ogün Altıparmak 37'	(Report)	İbrahim Ünal 62'	Stadium: Alsancak Stadium; Attendance: 3,876; Referee: Ali Timur

14 October 1962 3	Galatasaray SK	1–0	Fatih Karagümrük SK	Istanbul
16:15 EET	Tarık Kutver 59'	(Report)		Stadium: Mithatpaşa Stadi; Attendance: 18,034; Referee: Muzaffer Sarvan

20 October 1962 4	Şekerhilâl SK	2–5	Galatasaray SK	Ankara
15:45 EET	Ali Kandil 46' (pen.); İhsan Gümüş 89'	(Report)	Kadri Aytaç 11'; Mikael Temizer 16' (o.g.); Turan Doğangün 22'; İbrahim Ünal 71'; Talat Özkarslı 87'	Stadium: 19 Mayıs Stadı; Attendance: 9,490; Referee: Baha Kırçıl

21 October 1962 5	Gençlerbirliği SK	0–3	Galatasaray SK	Ankara
15:45 EET		(Report)	Metin Oktay 44' (pen.), 60', 81'	Stadium: 19 Mayıs Stadı; Attendance: 21,310; Referee: Hakkı Gürüz

3 November 1962 6	Galatasaray SK	1–1	Beykoz 1908 SKD	Istanbul
15:45 EET	Bahri Altıntabak 59'	(Report)	Bülent Gürbüz 60' (o.g.)	Stadium: Mithatpaşa Stadi; Attendance: 15,974; Referee: Cezmi Başar

4 November 1962 7	Galatasaray SK	3–2	Feriköy SK	Istanbul
15:45 EET	Tarık Kutver 12'; Uğur Köken 46'; Talat Özkarslı 51'	(Report)	Mahmut Evren 79', 87'	Stadium: Mithatpaşa Stadi; Attendance: 16,450; Referee: Sedat Özselçuk

9 December 1962 8	Galatasaray SK	5–1	Beyoğlu SK	Istanbul
15:45 EET	Talat Özkarslı 5'; Ayhan Elmastaşoğlu 18', 75' (pen.); Tarık Kutver 73', 79'	(Report)	Panayot Lemonidis 52'	Stadium: Mithatpaşa Stadi; Attendance: 9,345; Referee: Ali Timur

22 December 1962 9	Galatasaray SK	2–2	Ankara Demirspor	Istanbul
14:45 EET	Tarık Kutver 17'; Kadri Aytaç 57'	(Report)	Fikri Elma 52'; Ahmet Demirkale 82'	Stadium: Mithatpaşa Stadi; Attendance: 6,065; Referee: Muzaffer Sarvan

30 December 1962 10	Altay SK	2–0	Galatasaray SK	İzmir
15:00 EET	Önder Veral 16'; Nail Elmastaşoğlu 67'	(Report)		Stadium: Alsancak Stadium; Attendance: 7,989; Referee: Hüseyin Maloğlu

12 January 1963 11	Fatih Karagümrük SK	1–5	Galatasaray SK	Istanbul
15:00 EET	Recep Adanır 1'	(Report)	Talat Özkarslı 41'; Selahattin Ünlü 73' (o.g.); Ayhan Elmastaşoğlu 78'; Suat Mamat 85'; Metin Oktay 89' (pen.)	Stadium: Mithatpaşa Stadi; Attendance: 12,640; Referee: Doğan Babacan

20 January 1963 12	Beyoğlu SK	3–2	Galatasaray SK	Istanbul
14:45 EET	Güngör Sürel 5'; Dimitri Kaliçef 8', 44'	(Report)	Erdoğan Gökçen 21'; Kadri Aytaç 34' (pen.)	Stadium: Mithatpaşa Stadi; Attendance: 6,664; Referee: Ahmet Bagatır

2 February 1963 13	Galatasaray SK	3–1	Karşıyaka SK	Istanbul
15:00 EET	Metin Oktay 19' (pen.), 44'; Kadri Aytaç 53'	(Report)	Özcan Öngen 72' (pen.)	Stadium: Mithatpaşa Stadi; Attendance: 11,431; Referee: Sabahattin Ladikli

3 February 1963 14	Galatasaray SK	5–1	Şekerhilâl SK	Istanbul
14:45 EET	Ayhan Elmastaşoğlu 19', 35'; Metin Oktay 30', 49'; Uğur Köken 88'	(Report)	Yalçın Uğraş 76'	Stadium: Mithatpaşa Stadi; Attendance: 13,714; Referee: Baha Kırçıl

10 February 1963 15	Galatasaray SK	3–1	Göztepe SK	Istanbul
15:15 EET	Metin Oktay 13'; Tarık Kutver 72'; Uğur Köken 87'	(Report)	Fevzi Zemzem 6'	Stadium: Mithatpaşa Stadi; Attendance: 15,529; Referee: Zülbahar Sağnak

23 February 1963 16	Beykoz 1908 SKD	1–6	Galatasaray SK	Istanbul
15:15 EET	Talat Özkarslı 87'	(Report)	Tarık Kutver 19'; Ayhan Elmastaşoğlu 33', 77'; Metin Oktay 47', 59', 84'	Stadium: Mithatpaşa Stadi; Attendance: 8,920; Referee: Semih Zoroğlu

24 February 1963 17	Feriköy SK	0–1	Galatasaray SK	Istanbul
15:15 EET		(Report)	Ayhan Elmastaşoğlu 60'	Stadium: Mithatpaşa Stadi; Attendance: 4,886; Referee: Faruk Talu

27 February 1963 18	Galatasaray SK	2–1	Gençlerbirliği SK	Istanbul
15:15 EET	Metin Oktay 11', 85'	(Report)	Özkan Gürgün 39'	Stadium: Mithatpaşa Stadi; Attendance: 10,364; Referee: Hakkı Gürüz

3 March 1963 19	Ankara Demirspor	1–1	Galatasaray SK	Ankara
15:30 EET	Ahmet Demirkale 55'	(Report)	Metin Oktay 43'	Stadium: 19 Mayıs Stadı; Attendance: 20,732; Referee: Muzaffer Sarvan

16 March 1963 20	Galatasaray SK	1–0	Altay SK	Istanbul
15:45 EET	Ahmet Berman 85'	(Report)		Stadium: Mithatpaşa Stadi; Attendance: 12,819; Referee: Cezmi Başar

7 April 1963 21	Karşıyaka SK	1–1	Galatasaray SK	İzmir
17:00 EET	Özcan Öngen 4' (pen.)	(Report)	Metin Oktay 1'	Stadium: Alsancak Stadium; Attendance: 9,600; Referee: Cezmi Başar

13 April 1963 22	Galatasaray SK	1–1	Gençlerbirliği SK	Istanbul
16:45 EET	Tarık Kutver 47'	(Report)	Orhan Yüksel 24'	Stadium: Mithatpaşa Stadi; Attendance: 19,200; Referee: Mustafa Gerçeker

14 April 1963 23	Galatasaray SK	0–0	Hacettepe SK	Istanbul
16:45 EET		(Report)		Stadium: Mithatpaşa Stadi; Attendance: 14,421; Referee: Tahir Arcan

22 April 1963 24	Galatasaray SK	6–0	İstanbulspor	Istanbul
17:30 EET	Suat Mamat 17'; Metin Oktay 20', 35', 62' (pen.); Uğur Köken 25', 77'	(Report)		Stadium: Mithatpaşa Stadi; Attendance: 11,492; Referee: Faruk Talu

24 April 1963 25	Galatasaray SK	0–0	Fenerbahçe SK	Istanbul
20:00 EET		(Report)		Stadium: Mithatpaşa Stadi; Attendance: 38,662; Referee: Luciano Politano

27 April 1963 26	Galatasaray SK	3–1	Altay SK	Istanbul
15:15 EET	Nuri Asan 20'; Metin Oktay 31', 43'	(Report)	Hikmet Ok 54'	Stadium: Mithatpaşa Stadi; Attendance: 20,531; Referee: Alexandru Toth

4 May 1963 27	Galatasaray SK	5–2	Kasımpaşa SK	Istanbul
17:30 EET	Metin Oktay 15' (pen.), 48', 54', 58'; Tarık Kutver 73'	(Report)	Erol Orhon 68' (pen.); Ali Çobanoğlu 76'	Stadium: Mithatpaşa Stadi; Attendance: 22,720; Referee: Vladimir Stankovic

5 May 1963 28	Galatasaray SK	4–0	Beykoz 1908 SKD	Istanbul
17:30 EET	İbrahim Ünal 27'; Mustafa Yürür 64'; Kadri Aytaç 77'; Suat Mamat 79'	(Report)		Stadium: Mithatpaşa Stadi; Attendance: 21,155; Referee: Ali Sestic

11 May 1963 29	Galatasaray SK	2–0	Ankara Demirspor	Istanbul
17:30 EET	Tarık Kutver 65', 77'	(Report)		Stadium: Mithatpaşa Stadi; Attendance: 13,106; Referee: Comakov

12 May 1963 30	Galatasaray SK	3–0	İzmirspor	İzmir
17:30 EET	Bahri Altıntabak 17'; Kadri Aytaç 33'; Tarık Kutver 56'	(Report)		Stadium: Mithatpaşa Stadi; Attendance: 12,517; Referee: Gocho Rusev

15 May 1963 31	Galatasaray SK	1–2	Beşiktaş JK	Istanbul
20:00 EET	Metin Oktay 19'	(Report)	Şenol Birol 8'; Kaya Köstepen 38'	Stadium: Mithatpaşa Stadi; Attendance: 36,073; Referee: Bruno De Marchi

18 May 1963 32	İzmirspor	1–5	Galatasaray SK	İzmir
17:30 EET	Cengiz Karakayalı 15'	(Report)	Metin Oktay 47', 76', 84' (pen.); Kadri Aytaç 71'; Tarık Kutver 87'	Stadium: Alsancak Stadium; Attendance: 4,579; Referee: Paul Schiller

19 May 1963 33	Altay SK	0–0	Galatasaray SK	İzmir
17:30 EET		(Report)		Stadium: Alsancak Stadium; Attendance: 7,510; Referee: Paul Schiller

25 May 1963 34	Ankara Demirspor	1–4	Galatasaray SK	Ankara
15:15 EET	Ahmet Demirkale 51'	(Report)	Hakkı Ataeri 32' (o.g.); Tarık Kutver 39'; Mustafa Yürür 40'; Uğur Köken 89'	Stadium: 19 Mayıs Stadı; Referee: Emmanuel Fanakis

26 May 1963 35	Gençlerbirliği SK	2–3	Galatasaray SK	Ankara
18:00 EET	Özkan Gürgün 17'; Ahmet Karlıklı 51' (o.g.)	(Report)	Uğur Köken 36'; Ahmet Berman 40'; İbrahim Ünal 74'	Stadium: 19 Mayıs Stadı; Attendance: 18,269; Referee: Georgios Pelomis

29 May 1963 36	Istanbulspor	0–0	Galatasaray SK	Istanbul
20:00 EET		(Report)		Stadium: Mithatpaşa Stadi; Attendance: 6,934; Referee: Doğan Babacan

12 June 1963 37	Beykoz 1908 SKD	1–3	Galatasaray SK	Istanbul
20:00 EET	Aleko Yordan 78'	(Report)	Metin Oktay 24' (pen.); Tarık Kutver 47'; Mustafa Yürür 52'	Stadium: Mithatpaşa Stadi; Referee: Faturos Anastasidis

15 June 1963 38	Hacettepe SK	1–6	Galatasaray SK	Ankara
16:35 EET	Halis Harman 83'	(Report)	Tarık Kutver 17', 32'; Metin Oktay 42', 46', 59'; Uğur Köken 78'	Stadium: 19 Mayıs Stadı; Attendance: 14,476; Referee: Ali Timur

19 June 1963 39	Fenerbahçe SK	1–1	Galatasaray SK	Istanbul
20:00 EET	Şeref Has 50'	(Report)	Metin Oktay 85'	Stadium: Mithatpaşa Stadi; Attendance: 30,637; Referee: Luciano Politano

22 June 1963 40	Kasımpaşa SK	0–2	Galatasaray SK	Istanbul
17:00 EET		(Report)	İbrahim Ünal 73'; Metin Oktay 78'	Stadium: Mithatpaşa Stadi; Attendance: 6,363; Referee: Evangelos

23 June 1963 41	Galatasaray SK	3–0	Karşıyaka SK	Istanbul
17:00 EET	Kadri Aytaç 8', 41'; Metin Oktay 78'	(Report)		Stadium: Mithatpaşa Stadi; Attendance: 16,369; Referee: Evangelos

26 June 1963 42	Beşiktaş JK	0–1	Galatasaray SK	Istanbul
20:00 EET		(Report)	Metin Oktay 50' (pen.)	Stadium: Mithatpaşa Stadi; Attendance: 39,512; Referee: Francesco De Robbio

== Türkiye Kupası ==
Kick-off listed in local time (EET)

=== 2nd round ===
7 October 1962 1	Zonguldakspor	0–5	Galatasaray SK	Zonguldak
13:30 EET		(Report)	Tarık Kutver 1', 76'; Kadri Aytaç 28', 68'; Uğur Köken 53'	Stadium: Karaelmas Kemal Köksal Stadı; Referee: Orhan Gönül

=== 3rd round ===
26 December 1962	Galatasaray SK	6–0	Karşıyaka SK	Istanbul
17:30 EET	Uğur Köken 4'; Suat Mamat 34', 81'; Metin Oktay 51'; Tarık Kutver 55', 78'	(Report)		Stadium: Mithatpaşa Stadi; Attendance: 4,249; Referee: Orhan Gönül

=== 1/4 final ===
30 March 1963 1	Altay SK	0–2	Galatasaray SK	İzmir
17:00 EET		(Report)	Tarık Kutver 70', 72'	Stadium: Alsancak Stadium; Attendance: 7,260; Referee: Alessandro D'Agostini

10 April 1963 2	Galatasaray SK	1–1	Altay SK	Istanbul
20:00 EET	Ahmet Berman 85'	(Report)	Nail Elmastaşoğlu 15'	Stadium: Mithatpaşa Stadi; Attendance: 8,516; Referee: Emanuel Panakis

=== 1/2 final ===
1 May 1963 1	Ankara Demirspor	0–4	Galatasaray SK	Ankara
16:00 EET		(Report)	Nuri Asan 10'; Metin Oktay 40', 62', 81'	Stadium: 19 Mayıs Stadı; Attendance: 12,532; Referee: Nicolae Mihăilescu

10 June 1963 2	Galatasaray SK	5–2	Ankara Demirspor	Istanbul
14:45 EET	Tarık Kutver 25', 69'; Bahri Altıntabak 28', 59'; Mustafa Yürür 42'	(Report)	Yücel Öngelen 39'; Fikri Elma 53'	Stadium: Mithatpaşa Stadi; Referee: Alfred Haberfellner

=== Final ===
29 June 1963 1	Fenerbahçe SK	1–2	Galatasaray SK	Istanbul
19:00 EET	Selim Soydan 60'	(Report)	Uğur Köken 40'; Tarık Kutver 50'	Stadium: Mithatpaşa Stadi; Attendance: 23,740; Referee: Paul Schiller

30 June 1963 2	Galatasaray SK	2–1	Fenerbahçe SK	Istanbul
19:15 EET	Bahri Altıntabak 51'; Mustafa Yürür 71'	(Report)	Lefter Küçükandonyadis 44' (pen.)	Stadium: Mithatpaşa Stadi; Attendance: 27,361; Referee: Josef Alfred Stoll

== European Cup ==
=== Preliminary round ===
9 September 1962 1	FC Dinamo București	1–1	Galatasaray SK	Bucharest
EET	Ion Pârcălab 72' (pen.)	(Report)	Metin Oktay 53'	Stadium: 23 August Stadium; Attendance: 30,000; Referee: (Bulgaria) Georgi Hristov

16 September 1962 2	Galatasaray SK	3–0	FC Dinamo București	Istanbul
EET	Metin Oktay 13' (pen.); Uğur Köken 51'; Tarık Kutver 78'	(Report)		Stadium: Mithatpaşa Stadi; Attendance: 17,466; Referee: (Bulgaria) Atanas Kiryakov

=== 2nd round ===
7 November 1962 1	Galatasaray SK	4–1	Polonia Bytom	Istanbul
EET	Metin Oktay 19', 29', 57'; Suat Mamat 50'	(Report)	Norbert Pogrzeba 43'	Stadium: Mithatpaşa Stadi; Attendance: 23,274; Referee: (Romania) Vasile Dumitrescu

18 November 1962 2	Polonia Bytom	1–0	Galatasaray SK	Chorzów
EET	Jerzy Jóźwiak 20'	(Report)		Stadium: Silesian Stadium; Attendance: 8,462; Referee: (Germany) Helmut Köhler

=== 1/4 final ===
23 January 1963 1	Galatasaray SK	1–3	AC Milan	Istanbul
	Uğur Köken 4'	(Report)	Bruno Mora 34' (pen.); Paolo Barison 39'; José Altafini 76'	Stadium: Mithatpaşa Stadi; Attendance: 20,952; Referee: (Austria) Fritz Seipelt

13 March 1963 2	AC Milan	5–0	Galatasaray SK	Milan
	Gino Pivatelli 11', 42'; José Altafini 50', 66', 69'	(Report)		Stadium: San Siro; Attendance: 22,882; Referee: (Austria) Josef Stoll

== Friendly Matches ==
31 August 1962	Galatasaray SK	0–0	U.S. Città di Palermo	Istanbul
EET				Stadium: Mithatpaşa Stadi

1 September 1962	Beşiktaş JK	3–1	Galatasaray SK	Istanbul
EET	Şenol Birol 24' (pen.); Rahmi Kaleci 49'; Güven Önüt 58'		Metin Oktay 62' (pen.)	Stadium: Mithatpaşa Stadi; Attendance: 18,024

15 December 1962	Beşiktaş JK	1–1	Galatasaray SK	Istanbul
EET	Şenol Birol 2'		Turan Doğangün 56'	Stadium: Mithatpaşa Stadi; Attendance: 8,750

== Attendances ==
Competition	Av. Att.	Total Att.
Milli Lig	16,951	355,971
Türkiye Kupası	13,375	40,126
European Cup	20,564	61,692
Total	16,955	457,789
