= 1959–60 Galatasaray S.K. season =

Galatasaray
1959–60 season
- President: (Turkey) Sadık Giz (until 2 January 1960) (Turkey) Refik Selimoğlu
- Manager: (Italy) Leandro Remondini (until 2 January 1960) (Turkey) Coşkun Özarı
- Stadium: Mithatpaşa Stadi
- Milli Lig: 3rd
- Top goalscorer: League: Metin Oktay (33); All: Metin Oktay (33)
- Highest home attendance: 27,521 vs Beşiktaş JK (Milli Lig, 6 April 1960)
- Lowest home attendance: 8,128 vs Şekerhilâl SK (Milli Lig, 16 April 1960)
- Average home league attendance: 15,225
Home colours	Away colours	Third colours

The 1959–60 season was Galatasaray's 58th in existence and the 2nd consecutive season in the Milli Lig.

This article shows statistics of the club's players in the season, and also lists all matches that the club have played in the season.

== Squad statistics ==
No.	Pos.	Name	Milli Lig		Total	
No.	Pos.	Name	Apps	Goals	Apps	Goals
1	GK	(Turkey) Turgay Şeren(C)	34	0	34	0
-	GK	(Turkey) Yüksel Alkan	2	0	2	0
-	GK	(Turkey) Sedat Günertem	2	0	2	0
-	GK	(Turkey) Sabri Dino	0	0	0	0
-	DF	(Turkey) İsmail Kurt	21	0	21	0
-	DF	(Turkey) Cemil Gümüşdere	4	0	4	0
-	DF	(Turkey) Candemir Berkman	20	0	20	0
-	DF	(Turkey) Ahmet Karlıklı	25	4	25	4
-	DF	(Turkey) Saim Tayşengil	32	0	32	0
-	DF	(Turkey) Dursun Ali Baran	8	0	8	0
-	MF	(Turkey) Suat Mamat	37	16	37	16
-	MF	(Turkey) Bahri Altıntabak	0	0	0	0
-	MF	(Turkey) Mustafa Yürür	32	1	32	1
-	MF	(Turkey) Erdoğan Çelebi	0	0	0	0
-	MF	(Turkey) Coşkun Özarı	5	0	5	0
-	MF	(Turkey) Ergun Ercins	38	1	38	1
-	MF	(Turkey) Erol Kaynak	29	6	29	6
-	FW	(Turkey) Ahmet Berman	34	7	34	7
-	FW	(Turkey) Uğur Köken	12	0	12	0
-	FW	(Turkey) Nuri Asan	19	0	19	0
-	FW	(Turkey) İsfendiyar Açıksöz	11	4	11	4
-	FW	(Turkey) Yıldırım Benayyat	0	0	0	0
-	FW	(Turkey) Ayhan Elmastaşoğlu	0	0	0	0
-	FW	(Turkey) Cenap Doruk	0	0	0	0
-	FW	(Turkey) Samim Uygun	0	0	0	0
-	FW	(Turkey) Mete Basmacı	7	0	7	0
-	FW	(Turkey) Cengiz Özyalçın	5	0	5	0
-	FW	(Turkey) Zühtü Merter	5	1	5	1
-	FW	(Turkey) Ertan Adatepe	5	0	5	0
10	FW	(Turkey) Metin Oktay	33	33	33	33

=== Players in / out ===
==== In ====
Pos.	Nat.	Name	Age	Moving from
FW	(Turkey)	Ahmet Berman	27	Beşiktaş JK
MF	(Turkey)	Mustafa Yürür	21	Beykoz 1908 S.K.D.

== Milli Lig ==
=== Standings ===
Pos	Team	Pld	W	D	L	GF	GA	GD	Pts	Qualification
1	Beşiktaş (C)	38	29	7	2	68	15	+53	65	Qualification to European Cup preliminary round
2	Fenerbahçe	38	27	6	5	88	38	+50	60	Invitation to Balkans Cup
3	Galatasaray	38	24	10	4	74	23	+51	58	
4	İzmirspor	38	17	13	8	62	44	+18	47	
5	Ankara Demirspor	38	17	11	10	49	40	+9	45	

Source: rsssf.com
(C) Champions

=== Matches ===
26 August 1959 1	Galatasaray SK	2–0	Beykoz 1908 SKD	Istanbul
16:30 EET	Metin Oktay 23' (pen.); Ahmet Karlıklı 74'	(Report)		Stadium: Mithatpaşa Stadi; Attendance: 18,846; Referee: Bedri Çakır

6 September 1959 2	Galatasaray SK	3–0	Feriköy SK	Istanbul
16:30 EET	Metin Oktay 7', 8'; Suat Mamat 79'	(Report)		Stadium: Mithatpaşa Stadi; Attendance: 19,960; Referee: İhsan Tülmen

9 September 1959 3	Galatasaray SK	0–0	Kasımpaşa SK	Istanbul
16:00 EET		(Report)		Stadium: Mithatpaşa Stadi; Attendance: 15,267; Referee: Baha Kırçıl

26 September 1959 4	Galatasaray SK	3–0	Gençlerbirliği SK	Istanbul
15:45 EET	Metin Oktay 12'; Ahmet Berman 26'; Suat Mamat 38'	(Report)		Stadium: Mithatpaşa Stadi; Attendance: 12,349; Referee: Mustafa Gerçeker

27 September 1959 5	Galatasaray SK	1–0	Hacettepe SK	Istanbul
15:45 EET	Ahmet Berman 19'	(Report)		Stadium: Mithatpaşa Stadi; Attendance: 13,979; Referee: Ali Timur

30 September 1959 6	Galatasaray SK	2–1	Fatih Karagümrük SK	Istanbul
15:45 EET	Erol Kaynak 26'; Suat Mamat 88'	(Report)	Turhan Bayraktutan 10'	Stadium: Mithatpaşa Stadi; Attendance: 11,108; Referee: Sulhi Garan

10 October 1959 7	Galatasaray SK	4–1	Ankara Demirspor	Istanbul
15:15 EET	Erol Kaynak 5', 60'; Zühtü Merter 19'; Suat Mamat 37'	(Report)	Ergun Ercins 68' (o.g.)	Stadium: Mithatpaşa Stadi; Attendance: 13,740; Referee: Feyyaz Turgul

11 October 1959 8	Galatasaray SK	0–0	Altay SK	Istanbul
15:15 EET		(Report)		Stadium: Mithatpaşa Stadi; Attendance: 14,065; Referee: Orhan Gönül

24 October 1959 9	Galatasaray SK	8–0	Altınordu SK	Istanbul
14:45 EET	Metin Oktay 12', 19', 27', 40', 74'; Mustafa Yürür 55'; Suat Mamat 69', 71'	(Report)		Stadium: Mithatpaşa Stadi; Attendance: 9,881; Referee: Mustafa Gerçeker

25 October 1959 10	Galatasaray SK	2–1	Göztepe SK	Istanbul
14:45 EET	Suat Mamat 59'; Metin Oktay 88' (pen.)	(Report)	Hakkı İyibilir 9'	Stadium: Mithatpaşa Stadi; Attendance: 16,301; Referee: Ali Timur

18 November 1959 11	Galatasaray SK	1–1	Adalet SK	Istanbul
14:15 EET	Ahmet Berman 84'	(Report)	Burhan Sargun 59'	Stadium: Mithatpaşa Stadi; Attendance: 13,383; Referee: Ali Timur

28 November 1959 12	MKE Ankaragücü	0–1	Galatasaray SK	Ankara
14:15 EET		(Report)	Metin Oktay 18'	Stadium: 19 Mayıs Stadı; Attendance: 8,839; Referee: Mustafa Gerçeker

29 November 1959 13	Şekerhilâl SK	1–1	Galatasaray SK	Ankara
14:15 EET	Nazmi Meriç 5'	(Report)	Erol Kaynak 59'	Stadium: 19 Mayıs Stadı; Attendance: 11,873; Referee: Muzaffer Sarvan

2 December 1959 14	Beşiktaş JK	1–0	Galatasaray SK	Istanbul
14:15 EET	Nazmi Bilge 44'	(Report)		Stadium: Mithatpaşa Stadi; Attendance: 28,213; Referee: Hakkı Gürüz

12 December 1959 15	İzmirspor	3–3	Galatasaray SK	İzmir
14:15 EET	Orhan Pişirgen 26'; Necdet Elmasoğlu 28' (pen.); Cenap Doruk 46'	(Report)	Suat Mamat 13'; Erol Kaynak 48'; Metin Oktay 81'	Stadium: Alsancak Stadium; Attendance: n/a Referee: Veli Necdet Arığ

13 December 1959 16	Karşıyaka SK	0–0	Galatasaray SK	İzmir
14:15 EET		(Report)		Stadium: Alsancak Stadium; Attendance: 10,553; Referee: Necdet Oralalp

17 December 1959 17	Fenerbahçe SK	1–0	Galatasaray SK	Istanbul
14:00 EET	Can Bartu 77'	(Report)		Stadium: Mithatpaşa Stadi; Attendance: 28,142; Referee: Orhan Gönül

27 December 1959 18	Galatasaray SK	1–0	İstanbulspor	Istanbul
14:00 EET	Ahmet Karlıklı 6'	(Report)		Stadium: Mithatpaşa Stadi; Attendance: 14,417; Referee: Cezmi Başar

2 January 1960 19	Galatasaray SK	0–0	Vefa SK	Istanbul
14:00 EET		(Report)		Stadium: Mithatpaşa Stadi; Attendance: 14,591; Referee: Mustafa Gerçeker

27 January 1960 20	Beykoz 1908 SKD	2–3	Galatasaray SK	Istanbul
14:30 EET	Nusret Dalkıran 49', 50'	(Report)	İsfendiyar Açıksöz 60'; Metin Oktay 68'; Ahmet Berman 72'	Stadium: Mithatpaşa Stadi; Attendance: 9,491; Referee: Sulhi Garan

3 February 1960 21	Vefa SK	1–5	Galatasaray SK	Istanbul
12:45 EET	İbrahim Yalçınkaya 13'	(Report)	İsfendiyar Açıksöz 10'; Suat Mamat 16'; Metin Oktay 38', 50', 71'	Stadium: Mithatpaşa Stadi; Attendance: 12,034; Referee: Cezmi Başar

6 February 1960 22	Kasımpaşa SK	0–4	Galatasaray SK	Istanbul
14:45 EET		(Report)	Suat Mamat 40'; Metin Oktay 42', 52', 88'	Stadium: Mithatpaşa Stadi; Attendance: 5,734; Referee: Mustafa Gerçeker

13 February 1960 23	Hacettepe SK	1–2	Galatasaray SK	Ankara
14:45 EET	Halis Harman 73'	(Report)	Metin Oktay 50'; Suat Mamat 59'	Stadium: 19 Mayıs Stadı; Attendance: 7,061; Referee: Reşat Bünyan

14 February 1960 24	Gençlerbirliği SK	2–2	Galatasaray SK	Ankara
14:45 EET	Zeynel Soyuer 11'; Orhan Yüksel 17'	(Report)	Metin Oktay 29'; Suat Mamat 89'	Stadium: 19 Mayıs Stadı; Attendance: 16,525; Referee: Hakkı Gürüz

20 February 1960 25	Altay SK	0–3	Galatasaray SK	İzmir
15:15 EET		(Report)	Erol Kaynak 22'; Metin Oktay 71' (pen.), 88'	Stadium: Alsancak Stadium; Attendance: 6,432; Referee: Necdet Oralalp

21 February 1960 26	Ankara Demirspor	1–1	Galatasaray SK	İzmir
14:45 EET	Fikri Elma 10'	(Report)	Suat Mamat 83'	Stadium: Alsancak Stadium; Attendance: 10,955; Referee: Feyyaz Turgul

24 February 1960 27	Istanbulspor	0–3	Galatasaray SK	Istanbul
14:45 EET		(Report)	Ahmet Berman 54'; Metin Oktay 66', 80'	Stadium: Mithatpaşa Stadi; Attendance: 10,617; Referee: Sulhi Garan

2 March 1960 28	Adalet SK	0–2	Galatasaray SK	Istanbul
15:00 EET		(Report)	Ahmet Berman 3'; Vural Yılmaz 15' (o.g.)	Stadium: Mithatpaşa Stadi; Attendance: 16,067; Referee: Bedri Çakır

19 March 1960 29	Göztepe SK	0–1	Galatasaray SK	İzmir
15:15 EET		(Report)	Metin Oktay 67'	Stadium: Alsancak Stadium; Attendance: 5,195; Referee: Orhan Gönül

20 March 1960 30	Altınordu SK	1–3	Galatasaray SK	İzmir
15:15 EET	Beytullah Baliç 29'	(Report)	Metin Oktay 38'; İsfendiyar Açıksöz 54'; Suat Mamat 67'	Stadium: Alsancak Stadium; Attendance: 3,852; Referee: Orhan Gönül

26 March 1960 31	Feriköy SK	1-2	Galatasaray SK	Istanbul
15:15 EET	Samim Uygun 48'	(Report)	Metin Oktay 14' (pen.); İsfendiyar Açıksöz 57'	Stadium: Mithatpaşa Stadi; Attendance: 15,130; Referee: Tarık Yamaç

27 March 1960 32	Fatih Karagümrük SK	1–0	Galatasaray SK	Istanbul
15:15 EET	Doğan Sel 87'	(Report)		Stadium: Mithatpaşa Stadi; Attendance: 17,259; Referee: Cihat Ergün

6 April 1960 33	Galatasaray SK	0–1	Beşiktaş JK	Istanbul
15:30 EET		(Report)	Arif Özataç 70'	Stadium: Mithatpaşa Stadi; Attendance: 27,521; Referee: Yordan Tokov

13 April 1960 34	Galatasaray SK	2–1	Fenerbahçe SK	Istanbul
15:30 EET	Ahmet Berman 2'; Metin Oktay 25'	(Report)	Yüksel Gündüz 22'	Stadium: Mithatpaşa Stadi; Attendance: 24,953; Referee: Vilmos Hernadi

16 April 1960 35	Galatasaray SK	1–0	Şekerhilâl SK	Istanbul
15:45 EET	Ergun Ercins 83'	(Report)		Stadium: Mithatpaşa Stadi; Attendance: 8,128; Referee: Feyyaz Turgul

17 April 1960 36	Galatasaray SK	2–0	MKE Ankaragücü SK	Istanbul
15:45 EET	Suat Mamat 30'; Metin Oktay 57'	(Report)		Stadium: Mithatpaşa Stadi; Attendance: 9,331; Referee: Vilmos Hernadi

23 April 1960 37	Galatasaray SK	5–0	Karşıyaka SK	Istanbul
16:00 EET	Suat Mamat 4'; Ahmet Karlıklı 10', 86'; Metin Oktay 19', 57'	(Report)		Stadium: Mithatpaşa Stadi; Attendance: 12,405; Referee: Tarık Yamaç

24 April 1960 38	Galatasaray SK	1–1	İzmirspor	Istanbul
14:00 EET	Metin Oktay 60'	(Report)	Güven Önüt 14'	Stadium: Mithatpaşa Stadi; Attendance: 19,045; Referee: Zülbahar Sağnak

== Friendly Matches ==
Kick-off listed in local time (EET)

23 January 1960 Hasan Polatkan Kupası	Ankara Demirspor	1–1	Galatasaray SK	Ankara
13:15 EET	Fikri Elma 62'	(Report)	Suat Mamat 30'	Stadium: 19 Mayıs Stadı; Attendance: 7,161; Referee: Sabahattin Ladikli

24 January 1960 Hasan Polatkan Kupası	Fenerbahçe SK	1–2	Galatasaray SK	Ankara
15:00 EET	Lefter Küçükandonyadis 62'	(Report)	Uğur Köken 41', 61'	Stadium: 19 Mayıs Stadı; Attendance: 23,953; Referee: Veli Necdet Arığ

30 October 1959	Beşiktaş JK	0–0	Galatasaray SK	Ankara
15:00 EET		(Report)		Stadium: 19 Mayıs Stadı; Attendance: 29,145; Referee: Orhan Gönül

== Attendances ==
Competition	Av. Att.	Total Att.
Milli Lig	15,225	289,270
Total	15,225	289,270
