= 1963–64 Galatasaray S.K. season =

Galatasaray
1963–64 season
- President: (Turkey) Ulvi Yenal
- Manager: (Turkey) Gündüz Kılıç (until 8 December 1963) (Turkey) Coşkun Özarı
- Stadium: Mithatpaşa Stadi
- 1.Lig: 3rd
- Türkiye Kupası: Winner
- European Cup: First round
- Top goalscorer: League: Metin Oktay (18); All: Metin Oktay (31)
- Highest home attendance: 41,792 vs Fenerbahçe SK (1. Lig, 1 December 1963)
- Lowest home attendance: 5,230 vs Ankara Demirspor (1. Lig, 7 December 1963)
- Average home league attendance: 17,448
Home colours	Away colours

The 1963–64 season was Galatasaray's 60th in existence and the 6th consecutive season in the 1. Lig. This article shows statistics of the club's players in the season, and also lists all matches that the club have played in the season.

== Squad statistics ==
No.	Pos.	Name	1. Lig		Türkiye Kupası		CL		Total	
No.	Pos.	Name	Apps	Goals	Apps	Goals	Apps	Goals	Apps	Goals
1	GK	(Turkey) Turgay Şeren(C)	28	0	6	0	5	0	39	0
-	GK	(Turkey) Altay Yavuzarslan	0	0	0	0	0	0	0	0
-	GK	(Turkey) Bülent Gürbüz	6	0	0	0	0	0	6	0
-	DF	(Turkey) Doğan Sel	21	0	5	0	2	0	28	0
-	DF	(Turkey) Candemir Berkman	30	1	6	0	5	0	41	1
-	DF	(Turkey) Ahmet Karlıklı	8	0	0	0	0	0	8	0
-	MF	(Turkey) Bahri Altıntabak	19	9	1	1	5	1	25	11
-	MF	(Turkey) Talat Özkarslı	13	2	1	0	5	0	19	2
-	MF	(Turkey) Erol Boralı	16	0	5	0	0	0	21	0
-	DF	(Turkey) Ergun Ercins	20	0	6	0	0	0	26	0
-	MF	(Turkey) Mustafa Yürür	31	1	6	0	5	0	42	1
-	FW	(Turkey) Ahmet Berman	30	1	5	0	4	0	39	1
-	FW	(Turkey) Ayhan Elmastaşoğlu	3	1	4	2	5	0	12	3
-	FW	(Turkey) Benan Öney	10	0	0	0	1	0	10	0
-	FW	(Turkey) Uğur Köken	18	1	1	0	5	0	24	1
-	FW	(Turkey) Erol Gürmen	2	0	0	0	0	0	2	0
-	FW	(Turkey) Erdoğan Gökçen	3	0	0	0	0	0	3	0
-	FW	(Turkey) Yılmaz Gökdel	14	4	6	0	0	0	20	4
-	FW	(Turkey) Tarık Kutver	15	2	0	0	2	0	17	2
-	FW	(Turkey) Nuri Asan	9	1	2	0	0	0	11	1
-	FW	(Turkey) İbrahim Ünal	15	1	4	0	1	0	20	1
-	FW	(Turkey) Kadri Aytaç	31	6	2	0	5	0	38	6
10	FW	(Turkey) Metin Oktay	32	18	6	7	5	6	43	31

=== Players in / out ===
==== In ====
Pos.	Nat.	Name	Age	Moving from
FW	(Turkey)	Yılmaz Gökdel	23	Beykoz 1908 S.K.D.
DF	(Turkey)	Doğan Sel	27	Fatih Karagümrük SK
FW	(Turkey)	Benan Öney	23	İzmirspor

==== Out ====
Pos.	Nat.	Name	Age	Moving to
MF	(Turkey)	Suat Mamat	33	Beşiktaş JK

== 1.Lig ==
=== Standings ===
Pos	Team	Pld	W	D	L	GF	GA	GR	Pts	Qualification or relegation
1	Fenerbahçe (C)	34	21	11	2	55	14	3.929	53	Qualification to European Cup preliminary round
2	Beşiktaş	34	22	8	4	57	19	3.000	52	Invitation to Balkans Cup
3	Galatasaray	34	16	10	8	49	27	1.815	42	Qualification to Cup Winners' Cup first round
4	MKE Ankaragücü	34	17	8	9	52	38	1.368	42	
5	Göztepe	34	14	12	8	39	31	1.258	40	Invitation to Inter-Cities Fairs Cup first round

Rules for classification: Tiebreaker is the goal ratio (average of goals scored to goals allowed)
(C) Champions

=== Matches ===
31 August 1963 1	Galatasaray SK	0–0	Kasımpaşa SK	Istanbul
20:00 EET		(Report)		Stadium: Mithatpaşa Stadi; Attendance: 11,911; Referee: Semih Zoroğlu

8 September 1963 2	Galatasaray SK	2–1	Feriköy SK	Istanbul
17:45 EET	Bahri Altıntabak 23', 78'	(Report)	Ergun Darcan 86'	Stadium: Mithatpaşa Stadi; Attendance: 19,345; Referee: Nejat Şener

15 September 1963 3	Galatasaray SK	3–2	Beykoz 1908 SKD	Istanbul
17:00 EET	Metin Oktay 62', 71' (pen.), 87'	(Report)	Şirzat Dağcı 12'; Erol Türkmen 31'	Stadium: Mithatpaşa Stadi; Attendance: 19,439; Referee: Hakkı Gürüz

19 October 1963 4	Altay SK	1–1	Galatasaray SK	İzmir
16:30 EET	Nazmi Bilge 66' (pen.)	(Report)	Metin Oktay 14'	Stadium: Alsancak Stadium; Attendance: 3,130; Referee: Cezmi Başar

20 October 1963 5	Altınordu SK	0–3	Galatasaray SK	İzmir
16:30 EET		(Report)	Bahri Altıntabak 23', 31', 38'	Stadium: Alsancak Stadium; Attendance: 10,256; Referee: Necdet Oralalp

23 October 1963 6	Hacettepe SK	2–1	Galatasaray SK	Ankara
19:45 EET	Teoman Turfan 66'; Suphi Arabul 71'	(Report)	Talat Özkarslı 83'	Stadium: 19 Mayıs Stadı; Referee: Ali Timur

28 October 1963 7	Galatasaray SK	0–0	Beşiktaş JK	Istanbul
15:30 EET		(Report)		Stadium: Mithatpaşa Stadi; Attendance: 28,771; Referee: Semih Zoroğlu

2 November 1963 8	Gençlerbirliği SK	1–0	Galatasaray SK	Ankara
14:45 EET	Tevfik Kutlay 75'	(Report)		Stadium: 19 Mayıs Stadı; Referee: Abdi Parlakay

3 November 1963 9	MKE Ankaragücü SK	1–2	Galatasaray SK	Ankara
14:45 EET	Turan Doğangün 7'	(Report)	Kadri Aytaç 31', 78'	Stadium: 19 Mayıs Stadı; Attendance: 25,441; Referee: Muzaffer Sarvan

23 November 1963 10	Galatasaray SK	1–0	Beyoğlu SK	Istanbul
14:45 EET	Talat Özkarslı 23'	(Report)		Stadium: Mithatpaşa Stadi; Attendance: 32,270; Referee: Orhan Gönül

24 November 1963 11	Galatasaray SK	3–0	İstanbulspor	Istanbul
14:15 EET	Metin Oktay 22', 80', 88'	(Report)		Stadium: Mithatpaşa Stadi; Attendance: 13,628; Referee: Faruk Talu

1 December 1963 12	Galatasaray SK	0–0	Fenerbahçe SK	Istanbul
14:15 EET		(Report)		Stadium: Mithatpaşa Stadi; Attendance: 41,792; Referee: Richard Kekely

7 December 1964 13	Galatasaray SK	1–0	Ankara Demirspor	Istanbul
14:15 EET	Metin Oktay 55'	(Report)		Stadium: Mithatpaşa Stadi; Attendance: 5,230; Referee: Mustafa Gerçeker

8 December 1963 14	Galatasaray SK	0–0	Göztepe SK	Istanbul
14:15 EET		(Report)		Stadium: Mithatpaşa Stadi; Attendance: 11,571; Referee: Veli Necdet Arığ

4 January 1964 15	Karşıyaka SK	1–1	Galatasaray SK	İzmir
14:30 EET	Ahmet Tuna Kozan 63'	(Report)	Kadri Aytaç 52'	Stadium: Alsancak Stadium; Referee: Orhan Gönül

5 January 1964 16	İzmirspor	2–1	Galatasaray SK	İzmir
14:30 EET	Turgay Meto 44'; Necip Sezer 85'	(Report)	Tarık Kutver 44'	Stadium: Alsancak Stadium; Referee: Zülbahar Sağnak

11 January 1964 17	Galatasaray SK	1–0	PTT SK	Istanbul
14:15 EET	Metin Oktay 42'	(Report)		Stadium: Mithatpaşa Stadi; Referee: Hakkı Çaktırma

25 January 1964 18	Beyoğlu SK	2–2	Galatasaray SK	Istanbul
14:15 EET	Avram Papanastasiu 53', 56'	(Report)	Uğur Köken 60'; Kadri Aytaç 88'	Stadium: Mithatpaşa Stadi; Attendance: 8,621; Referee: Necdet Oralalp

1 February 1964 19	Istanbulspor	0–2	Galatasaray SK	Istanbul
14:15 EET		(Report)	Yılmaz Gökdel 50'; Bahri Altıntabak 66'	Stadium: Mithatpaşa Stadi; Attendance: 6,087; Referee: Hakkı Gürüz

15 February 1964 20	Feriköy SK	0–1	Galatasaray SK	Istanbul
14:15 EET		(Report)	Kadri Aytaç 72'	Stadium: Mithatpaşa Stadi; Referee: Kemal Yavman

16 February 1964 21	Kasımpaşa SK	0–5	Galatasaray SK	Istanbul
14:15 EET		(Report)	Metin Oktay 34', 88'; Candemir Berkman 49'; Tarık Kutver 50'; Celil Özdemir 86' (o.g.)	Stadium: Mithatpaşa Stadi; Referee: Baha Kırçıl

29 February 1964 22	Beykoz 1908 SKD	0–1	Galatasaray SK	Istanbul
15:15 EET		(Report)	Metin Oktay 67'	Stadium: Mithatpaşa Stadi; Attendance: 9,887; Referee: Orhan Gönül

7 March 1964 23	Galatasaray SK	3–0	Altay SK	Istanbul
15:15 EET	Bahri Altıntabak 10', 75', 86'	(Report)		Stadium: Mithatpaşa Stadi; Attendance: 10,259; Referee: Ali Timur

8 March 1964 24	Galatasaray SK	4–0	İzmirspor	İzmir
15:15 EET	Yılmaz Gökdel 1'; Metin Oktay 10', 83'; Kadri Aytaç 71'	(Report)		Stadium: Mithatpaşa Stadi; Attendance: 11,000; Referee: Cezmi Başar

22 March 1964 25	Beşiktaş JK	2–1	Galatasaray SK	Istanbul
15:30 EET	Ahmet Özacar 65'; Sanlı Sarıalioğlu 89'	(Report)	Metin Oktay 80' (pen.)	Stadium: Mithatpaşa Stadi; Attendance: 42,983; Referee: Helmut Fritz

4 April 1964 26	PTT SK	2–2	Galatasaray SK	Ankara
15:30 EET	Mustafa Aslan 8', 30'	(Report)	Metin Oktay 24'; Ahmet Berman 31'	Stadium: 19 Mayıs Stadı; Attendance: 28,776; Referee: Mustafa Gerçeker

5 March 1964 27	Ankara Demirspor	2–0	Galatasaray SK	Ankara
15:30 EET	Ahmet Demirkale 68'; Timuçin Berker 89'	(Report)		Stadium: 19 Mayıs Stadı; Referee: Hakkı Çaktırma

11 April 1964 28	Galatasaray SK	2–4	MKE Ankaragücü SK	Istanbul
16:00 EET	Metin Oktay 25'; Yılmaz Gökdel 74'	(Report)	Turan Doğangün 5', 41', 45'; Hayri Şener 73'	Stadium: Mithatpaşa Stadi; Attendance: 12,004; Referee: Ali Timur

12 April 1964 29	Galatasaray SK	1–2	Gençlerbirliği SK	Istanbul
16:00 EET	Nuri Asan 1'	(Report)	Oktay Arıca 31'; Ali Güreyman 38'	Stadium: Mithatpaşa Stadi; Attendance: 11,602; Referee: Hakkı Gürüz

18 April 1964 30	Galatasaray SK	0–1	Altınordu SK	Istanbul
16:15 EET		(Report)	Muhterem Ar 70'	Stadium: Mithatpaşa Stadi; Attendance: 30,012; Referee: Zülbahar Sağnak

19 April 1964 31	Galatasaray SK	4–1	Karşıyaka SK	Istanbul
16:15 EET	Metin Oktay 16'; Ayhan Elmastaşoğlu 47'; Yılmaz Gökdel 48'; Mustafa Yürür 83'	(Report)	Argun Akmoral 45'	Stadium: Mithatpaşa Stadi; Attendance: 10,600; Referee: Necdet Oralalp

2 May 1964 32	Göztepe SK	0–1	Galatasaray SK	İzmir
16:00 EET		(Report)	İbrahim Ünal 14'	Stadium: Alsancak Stadium; Referee: Necdet Oralalp

17 May 1964 33	Galatasaray SK	0–0	Hacettepe SK	Istanbul
15:45 EET		(Report)		Stadium: Mithatpaşa Stadi; Attendance: 9,739; Referee: Nejat Şener

24 May 1964 34	Fenerbahçe SK	0–0	Galatasaray SK	Istanbul
16:45 EET		(Report)		Stadium: Mithatpaşa Stadi; Attendance: 42,891; Referee: Hakkı Gürüz

== Türkiye Kupası ==
Kick-off listed in local time (EET)

=== 1/4 final ===
22 April 1964 1	Galatasaray SK	1–0	PTT SK	Istanbul
16:00 EET	Metin Oktay 2'	(Report)		Stadium: Mithatpaşa Stadi; Attendance: 7,604; Referee: Hakkı Çaktırma

5 May 1964 2	PTT SK	1–2	Galatasaray SK	Ankara
19:30 EET	Yılmaz Yücetürk 52'	(Report)	Metin Oktay 22', 71'	Stadium: 19 Mayıs Stadı; Referee: Ali Timur

=== 1/2 final ===
7 June 1964 1	MKE Ankaragücü SK	1–2	Galatasaray SK	Ankara
17:30 EET	Selçuk Yalçıntaş 42'	(Report)	Bahri Altıntabak 59'; Metin Oktay 86'	Stadium: 19 Mayıs Stadı; Referee: Hakkı Çaktırma

13 June 1964 2	Galatasaray SK	5–1	MKE Ankaragücü SK	Istanbul
18:00 EET	Metin Oktay 34', 37', 60'; Ayhan Elmastaşoğlu 38', 62'	(Report)	Halim Kütükçüoğlu 52'	Stadium: Mithatpaşa Stadi; Attendance: 15,283; Referee: Muzaffer Sarvan

=== Final ===
21 June 1964 1	Altay SK	0–0	Galatasaray SK	İzmir
18:30 EET		(Report)		Stadium: Alsancak Stadium; Attendance: 8,035; Referee: Gerhard Schulenburg

29 June 1964 2	Galatasaray SK	3–0	Altay SK	Istanbul
18:00 EET	awarded 3–0	(Report)		Stadium: Mithatpaşa Stadi; Referee: Nicolae Mihăilescu

== European Cup ==
=== Preliminary round ===
11 September 1963 1	Galatasaray SK	4–0	Ferencváros TC	Istanbul
EET	Bahri Altıntabak 28'; Metin Oktay 50', 84' (pen.); Tarık Kutver 61'	(Report)		Stadium: Mithatpaşa Stadi; Attendance: 19,397; Referee: (Czechoslovakia) Karol Galba

12 October 1963 2	Ferencváros TC	2–0	Galatasaray SK	Budapest
EET	Flórián Albert 21' (pen.), 74'	(Report)		Stadium: Üllõi úti Stadium; Attendance: 27,345; Referee: (Czechoslovakia) Stanislav Fencl

=== 2nd round ===
14 November 1963 1	FC Zürich	2–0	Galatasaray SK	Zürich
EET	Rosario Martinelli 20'; Klaus Stürmer 83'	(Report)		Stadium: Letzigrund; Attendance: 24,000; Referee: (Denmark) Tage Sørensen

27 November 1963 2	Galatasaray SK	2–0	FC Zürich	Istanbul
EET	Metin Oktay 9' (pen.), 53' (pen.)	(Report)		Stadium: Mithatpaşa Stadi; Attendance: 22,987; Referee: (Bulgaria) Kostadin Dinov

11 December 1963 3	FC Zürich	2–2	Galatasaray SK	Rome
EET	Peter von Burg 77'; Werner Leimgruber 118'	(Report)	Metin Oktay 85', 92'	Stadium: Stadio Flaminio; Attendance: 602; Referee: (Italy) Giuseppe Adami

Zürich 2–2 Galatasaray in play-off match. Zürich qualified on a coin toss

== Friendly Matches ==
=== TSYD Kupası ===
10 August 1963 1	Galatasaray SK	3–0	Beyoğlu SK	Istanbul
18:00 EET	Mustafa Yürür 7'; Metin Oktay 86', 89'	(Report)		Stadium: Mithatpaşa Stadi; Attendance: 14,418; Referee: Ahmet Bagatır

11 August 1963 2	Galatasaray SK	1–0	Beykoz 1908 S.K.D.	Istanbul
20:00 EET	Metin Oktayp 33'	(Report)		Stadium: Mithatpaşa Stadi; Attendance: 14,262; Referee: Sedat Özselçuk

21 August 1963 3	Galatasaray SK	1–1	Beşiktaş JK	Istanbul
20:00 EET	Tarık Kutver 37'	(Report)	Güven Önüt 44'	Stadium: Mithatpaşa Stadi; Attendance: 24,234; Referee: Faruk Talu

=== Atatürk Kupası ===
2 October 1963	Galatasaray SK	3–0	Beşiktaş JK	Istanbul
20:00 EET	Uğur Köken 62'; Tarık Kutver 71'; Ergin Gürses 87'			Stadium: Mithatpaşa Stadi; Attendance: 15,833; Referee: Muzaffer Sarvan

== Attendances ==
Competition	Av. Att.	Total Att.
1. Lig	17,448	279,173
Türkiye Kupası	11,444	22,887
European Cup	21,192	42,384
Total	17,222	344,444
