= 1960–61 Galatasaray S.K. season =

Galatasaray
1960–61 season
- President: (Turkey) Refik Selimoğlu
- Manager: (Turkey) Gündüz Kılıç
- Stadium: Mithatpaşa Stadi
- Milli Lig: 2nd
- Top goalscorer: League: Metin Oktay (36); All: Metin Oktay (36)
- Highest home attendance: 25,438 vs Beykoz 1908 S.K.D. (Milli Lig, 15 April 1961)
- Lowest home attendance: 9,029 vs PTT SK (Milli Lig, 22 January 1961)
- Average home league attendance: 16,711
Home colours	Away colours

The 1960–61 season was Galatasaray's 57th in existence and the 3rd consecutive season in the Milli Lig. This article shows statistics of the club's players in the season, and also lists all matches that the club have played in the season.

== Squad statistics ==
No.	Pos.	Name	Milli Lig		Total	
No.	Pos.	Name	Apps	Goals	Apps	Goals
1	GK	(Turkey) Turgay Şeren(C)	33	0	33	0
-	GK	(Turkey) Bülent Gürbüz	5	0	5	0
-	DF	(Turkey) Candemir Berkman	24	0	24	0
-	DF	(Turkey) Ahmet Karlıklı	22	1	22	1
-	DF	(Turkey) Dursun Ali Baran	2	0	2	0
-	MF	(Turkey) Suat Mamat	30	8	30	8
-	MF	(Turkey) Bahri Altıntabak	32	9	32	9
-	MF	(Turkey) Mustafa Yürür	32	2	32	2
-	MF	(Turkey) Erdoğan Çelebi	1	0	1	0
-	MF	(Turkey) Ergun Ercins	35	0	35	0
-	MF	(Turkey) Erol Kaynak	5	0	5	0
-	FW	(Turkey) Ahmet Berman	36	0	36	0
-	FW	(Turkey) Ayhan Elmastaşoğlu	12	4	12	4
-	FW	(Turkey) Uğur Köken	15	3	15	3
-	FW	(Turkey) Nuri Asan	4	0	4	0
-	FW	(Turkey) Cenap Doruk	3	0	3	0
-	FW	(Turkey) Niyazi Tamakan	32	2	32	2
-	FW	(Turkey) Mete Basmacı	22	3	22	3
-	FW	(Turkey) Recep Adanır	20	4	20	4
-	FW	(Turkey) Samim Uygun	23	2	23	2
10	FW	(Turkey) Metin Oktay	30	36	30	36

=== Players in / out ===
==== In ====
Pos.	Nat.	Name	Age	Moving from
FW	(Turkey)	Ayhan Elmastaşoğlu	19	Altay SK
MF	(Turkey)	Bahri Altıntabak	21	Göztepe S.K.
FW	(Turkey)	Recep Adanır	31	Kasımpaşa SK
FW	(Turkey)	Cenap Doruk	18	İzmirspor
FW	(Turkey)	Niyazi Tamakan	28	Fenerbahçe SK
FW	(Turkey)	Samim Uygun	21	Feriköy S.K

==== Out ====
Pos.	Nat.	Name	Age	Moving to
MF	(Turkey)	Coşkun Özarı	25	career end
MF	(Turkey)	İsfendiyar Açıksöz	31	career end
MF	(Turkey)	İsmail Kurt	26	Fenerbahçe SK
FW	(Turkey)	Ertan Adatepe	22	MKE Ankaragücü
DF	(Turkey)	Saim Tayşengil	28	Beykoz 1908 S.K.D.

== Milli Lig ==
=== Standings ===
Pos	Team	Pld	W	D	L	GF	GA	GR	Pts	Qualification
1	Fenerbahçe (C)	38	26	9	3	81	29	2.793	61	Qualification to European Cup first round and invitation to Balkans Cup
2	Galatasaray	38	27	6	5	75	19	3.947	60	Invitation to Balkans Cup
3	Beşiktaş	38	22	11	5	61	26	2.346	55	
4	Beykoz	38	17	15	6	51	34	1.500	49	
5	Gençlerbirliği	38	16	13	9	54	39	1.385	45	

(C) Champions

=== Matches ===
3 September 1960 1	Galatasaray SK	2–0	Vefa SK	Istanbul
16:15 EET	Suat Mamat 28'; Metin Oktay 30'	(Report)		Stadium: Mithatpaşa Stadi; Attendance: 13,951; Referee: Muzaffer Sarvan

4 September 1960 2	Galatasaray SK	2–0	Feriköy SK	Istanbul
16:15 EET	Metin Oktay 53' (pen.); Suat Mamat 71'	(Report)		Stadium: Mithatpaşa Stadi; Attendance: n/a Referee: Hüsnü Kavasoğlu

10 September 1960 3	Galatasaray SK	2–0	İstanbulspor	Istanbul
16:30 EET	Suat Mamat 7'; Ahmet Karlıklı 36'	(Report)		Stadium: Mithatpaşa Stadi; Attendance: 14,465; Referee: Baha Kırçıl

17 September 1960 4	Galatasaray SK	3–1	İzmirspor	Istanbul
15:45 EET	Bahri Altıntabak 22'; Samim Uygun 26', 62'	(Report)	Rahmi Kaleci 44'	Stadium: Mithatpaşa Stadi; Attendance: 23,047; Referee: Abdi Parlakay

18 September 1960 5	Galatasaray SK	3–3	Altınordu SK	Istanbul
15:45 EET	Recep Adanır 29'; Suat Mamat 55'; Niyazi Tamakan 60'	(Report)	Beytullah Baliç 54'; Aydoğan Çipiloğlu 78'; Arif Gümüşçeviren 80'	Stadium: Mithatpaşa Stadi; Attendance: 12,573; Referee: Bedri Çakır

1 October 1960 6	Gençlerbirliği SK	3–0	Galatasaray SK	Ankara
16:00 EET	Nevzat Ergökçel 10'; Orhan Yüksel 19', 46'	(Report)		Stadium: 19 Mayıs Stadı; Attendance: 17,414; Referee: Muzaffer Sarvan

2 October 1960 7	Adana Demirspor	2–2	Galatasaray SK	Ankara
15:30 EET	Selami Tekkazancı 14', 59'	(Report)	Mete Basmacı 79'; Niyazi Tamakan 82'	Stadium: 19 Mayıs Stadı; Attendance: 12,240; Referee: Orhan Gönül

21 October 1960 8	Altay SK	0–0	Galatasaray SK	İzmir
15:15 EET		(Report)		Stadium: Alsancak Stadium; Attendance: n/a Referee: Cezmi Başar

22 October 1960 9	Karşıyaka SK	0–1	Galatasaray SK	İzmir
15:45 EET		(Report)	Mustafa Yürür 84'	Stadium: Alsancak Stadium; Attendance: 4,593; Referee: Zülbahar Sağnak

29 October 1960 10	Galatasaray SK	3–0	Fatih Karagümrük SK	Istanbul
13:15 EET	Metin Oktay 58', 70'; Mete Basmacı 74'	(Report)		Stadium: Mithatpaşa Stadi; Attendance: 24,933; Referee: Faruk Talu

5 November 1960 11	Beykoz 1908 SKD	0–0	Galatasaray SK	Istanbul
15:00 EET		(Report)		Stadium: Mithatpaşa Stadi; Attendance: 20,053; Referee: Semih Zoroğlu

3 December 1960 12	PTT SK	1–3	Galatasaray SK	Ankara
14:15 EET	Şükrü Turankök 53'	(Report)	Metin Oktay 18', 23', 51'	Stadium: 19 Mayıs Stadı; Attendance: 8,560; Referee: Orhan Gönül

4 December 1960 13	Şekerhilâl SK	0–6	Galatasaray SK	Ankara
14:15 EET		(Report)	Bahri Altıntabak 4', 45'; Metin Oktay 28', 30', 88'; İlhan Bozer 42' (o.g.)	Stadium: 19 Mayıs Stadı; Attendance: 14,142; Referee: Feyyaz Turgul

11 December 1960 14	Göztepe SK	1–3	Galatasaray SK	İzmir
14:00 EET	Ayhan Türközü 57'	(Report)	Mete Basmacı 53'; Suat Mamat 68'; Metin Oktay 74'	Stadium: Alsancak Stadium; Attendance: 8,137; Referee: Veli Necdet Arığ

17 December 1960 15	Galatasaray SK	0–0	Kasımpaşa SK	Istanbul
12:00 EET		(Report)		Stadium: Mithatpaşa Stadi; Attendance: 20,350; Referee: Abdülfeth Çalışkan

18 December 1960 16	Fenerbahçe SK	0–5	Galatasaray SK	Istanbul
14:00 EET		(Report)	Metin Oktay 1', 9', 61', 68'; Bahri Altıntabak 25'	Stadium: Mithatpaşa Stadi; Attendance: 28,900; Referee: Semih Zoroğlu

24 December 1960 17	MKE Ankaragücü	1–0	Galatasaray SK	Ankara
14:00 EET	Hayri Şener 40'	(Report)		Stadium: 19 Mayıs Stadı; Attendance: 12,902; Referee: Muzaffer Sarvan

25 December 1960 18	Ankara Demirspor	0–2	Galatasaray SK	Ankara
14:00 EET		(Report)	Metin Oktay 38' (pen.), 70'	Stadium: 19 Mayıs Stadı; Attendance: 8,671; Referee: Feyyaz Turgul

1 January 1961 19	Galatasaray SK	1–0	Beşiktaş JK	Istanbul
14:00 EET	Bahri Altıntabak 5'	(Report)		Stadium: Mithatpaşa Stadi; Attendance: 24,301; Referee: Cihat Ergün

21 January 1961 20	Galatasaray SK	5–0	Şekerhilâl SK	Istanbul
16:30 EET	Suat Mamat 12'; Bahri Altıntabak 15', 81'; Metin Oktay 29', 45' (pen.)	(Report)		Stadium: Mithatpaşa Stadi; Attendance: 9,209; Referee: Hakkı Çaktırma

22 January 1961 21	Galatasaray SK	1–0	PTT SK	Istanbul
14:15 EET	Metin Oktay 78'	(Report)		Stadium: Mithatpaşa Stadi; Attendance: 9,029; Referee: Hakkı Gürüz

11 February 1961 22	Vefa SK	0–2	Galatasaray SK	Istanbul
20:00 EET		(Report)	Ayhan Elmastaşoğlu 39'; Metin Oktay 88'	Stadium: Mithatpaşa Stadi; Attendance: 14,802; Referee: Faruk Talu

12 February 1961 23	Galatasaray SK	4–0	Göztepe SK	Istanbul
14:30 EET	Metin Oktay 41', 83'; Ayhan Elmastaşoğlu 47'; Mustafa Yürür 75'	(Report)		Stadium: Mithatpaşa Stadi; Attendance: 14,569; Referee: Veli Necdet Arığ

25 February 1961 24	Altınordu SK	0–3	Galatasaray SK	İzmir
15:15 EET		(Report)	Bahri Altıntabak 53', 57'; Metin Oktay 55'	Stadium: Alsancak Stadium; Attendance: 7,060; Referee: Mustafa Gerçeker

26 February 1961 25	İzmirspor	2–1	Galatasaray SK	İzmir
15:15 EET	Orhan Pişirgen 10', 15'	(Report)	Metin Oktay 56'	Stadium: Alsancak Stadium; Attendance: 15,290; Referee: Tahir Arcan

12 March 1961 26	Feriköy SK	0–1	Galatasaray SK	Istanbul
15:15 EET		(Report)	Recep Adanır 20' (pen.)	Stadium: Mithatpaşa Stadi; Attendance: 18,813; Referee: Muvahhit Afir

20 March 1961 27	Beşiktaş JK	2–0	Galatasaray SK	Istanbul
15:30 EET	Mustafa Ertan 20'; Birol Pekel 54'	(Report)		Stadium: Mithatpaşa Stadi; Attendance: 26,868; Referee: Mustafa Gerçeker

1 April 1961 28	Kasımpaşa SK	0–1	Galatasaray SK	Istanbul
16:00 EET		(Report)	Ayhan Elmastaşoğlu 61'	Stadium: Mithatpaşa Stadi; Attendance: 16,176; Referee: Nejat Şener

2 April 1961 29	Fatih Karagümrük SK	0–0	Galatasaray SK	Istanbul
16:00 EET		(Report)		Stadium: Mithatpaşa Stadi; Attendance: 14,633; Referee: Semih Zoroğlu

15 April 1961 30	Galatasaray SK	5–0	Beykoz 1908 SKD	Istanbul
16:15 EET	Suat Mamat 19', 27'; Metin Oktay 40', 57', 59' (pen.)	(Report)		Stadium: Mithatpaşa Stadi; Attendance: 25,438; Referee: Ahmet Bagatır

22 April 1961 31	Galatasaray SK	2–0	Karşıyaka SK	Istanbul
16:15 EET	Metin Oktay 30' (pen.), 75' (pen.)	(Report)		Stadium: Mithatpaşa Stadi; Attendance: 13,250; Referee: Cezmi Başar

23 April 1961 32	Galatasaray SK	4–0	Altay SK	Istanbul
16:30 EET	Metin Oktay 69', 84', 87'; Uğur Köken 82'	(Report)		Stadium: Mithatpaşa Stadi; Attendance: 11,786; Referee: Hüseyin Maloğlu

29 April 1961 33	Galatasaray SK	2–0	Adana Demirspor	Istanbul
16:30 EET	Metin Oktay 5' (pen.), 47'	(Report)		Stadium: Mithatpaşa Stadi; Attendance: 12,477; Referee: Nuri Kelebek

30 April 1961 34	Galatasaray SK	1–0	Gençlerbirliği SK	Istanbul
17:00 EET	Recep Adanır 25'	(Report)		Stadium: Mithatpaşa Stadi; Attendance: 18,414; Referee: Mustafa Gerçeker

20 May 1961 35	Galatasaray SK	1–0	Ankara Demirspor	Istanbul
17:00 EET	Recep Adanır 81'	(Report)		Stadium: Mithatpaşa Stadi; Attendance: 14,067; Referee: Mustafa Gerçeker

21 May 1961 36	Galatasaray SK	2–1	MKE Ankaragücü SK	Istanbul
17:00 EET	Metin Oktay 9'; Uğur Köken 60'	(Report)	Hayri Şener 42'	Stadium: Mithatpaşa Stadi; Attendance: 15,463; Referee: Hakkı Gürüz

24 June 1961 37	Istanbulspor	1–0	Galatasaray SK	Istanbul
15:30 EET	Nedim Doğan 70'	(Report)		Stadium: Mithatpaşa Stadi; Attendance: 23,362; Referee: Stevan Konstantinov

25 June 1961 38	Galatasaray SK	2–1	Fenerbahçe SK	Istanbul
17:30 EET	Uğur Köken 33'; Ayhan Elmastaşoğlu 67'	(Report)	Yüksel Gündüz 32'	Stadium: Mithatpaşa Stadi; Attendance: 23,476; Referee: Yordan Tokov

== Friendly Matches ==
Kick-off listed in local time (EET)

7 September 1960	Galatasaray SK	1–0	Fenerbahçe SK	Ankara
15:30 EET	Metin Oktay 56'	(Report)		Stadium: 19 Mayıs Stadı; Attendance: 31,045; Referee: Cezmi Başar

5 October 1960	Fenerbahçe SK	0–0	Galatasaray SK	Ankara
16:00 EET		(Report)		Stadium: 19 Mayıs Stadı; Attendance: 21,532; Referee: Bedri Çakır

=== Cemal Gürsel Kupası ===
18 June 1960 1	Galatasaray SK	1–0	Kasımpaşa SK	Istanbul
17:00 EET	Suat Mamat 82'	(Report)		Stadium: Mithatpaşa Stadi; Attendance: 15,432; Referee: Faruk Talu

22 June 1960 2	Galatasaray SK	4–2	All Star team of Izmit	Istanbul
15:45 EET	Suat Mamat 27', 74'; Metin Oktay 34', 55'	(Report)		Stadium: Mithatpaşa Stadi; Attendance: 8,234; Referee: Zeki Özcan

25 June 1960 3	Galatasaray SK	3–1	Beykoz 1908 SKD	Istanbul
15:45 EET	Metin Oktay 21'; Nuri Asan 63'; Mete Basmacı 79'	(Report)	Şirzat Dağcı 75'	Stadium: Mithatpaşa Stadi; Attendance: 8,407; Referee: Necdet Türkantoz

2 July 1960 1	Galatasaray SK	2–0	Beşiktaş JK	Istanbul
18:30 EET	Samim Uygun 65'; Suat Mamat 88'	(Report)		Stadium: Mithatpaşa Stadi; Attendance: 17,386; Referee: Necdet Türkantoz

3 July 1960 2	Fenerbahçe SK	1–0	Galatasaray SK	Istanbul
18:30 EET	Lefter Küçükandonyadis 46'	(Report)		Stadium: Mithatpaşa Stadi; Attendance: 26,114; Referee: Sulhi Garan

== Attendances ==
Competition	Av. Att.	Total Att.
Milli Lig	16,711	300,798
Total	16,711	300,798
