= 1967–68 Galatasaray S.K. season =

Galatasaray
1967–68 season
- President: (Turkey) Suphi Batur
- Manager: (Turkey) Eşfak Aykaç & (Turkey) Bülent Eken
- Stadium: Ali Sami Yen Stadi; Mithatpaşa Stadi
- 1.Lig: 3rd
- Türkiye Kupası: semi finalist
- Top goalscorer: League: Metin Oktay (18); All: Metin Oktay (21)
- Highest home attendance: 41,862 vs Vefa SK (1. Lig, 18 February 1968)
- Lowest home attendance: 10,358 vs Altınordu F.K. (Türkiye Kupası, 27 January 1968)
- Average home league attendance: 32,737
Home colours	Away colours

The 1967–68 season was Galatasaray's 64th in existence and the 10th consecutive season in the 1. Lig. This article shows statistics of the club's players in the season, and also lists all matches that the club have played in the season.

== Squad statistics ==
No.	Pos.	Name	1. Lig		Türkiye Kupası		Total	
No.	Pos.	Name	Apps	Goals	Apps	Goals	Apps	Goals
1	GK	(Turkey) Yasin Özdenak	26	0	5	0	31	0
-	GK	(Socialist Federal Republic of Yugoslavia) Tatomir Radunovic	5	0	2	0	7	0
-	GK	(Turkey) Faruk Özceylan	4	0	3	0	7	0
-	DF	(Turkey) Ergün Acuner	22	3	5	2	27	5
-	DF	(Turkey) Doğan Sel	31	1	7	0	38	1
-	DF	(Turkey) Erdal Tuncer	20	0	6	0	26	0
-	DF	(Turkey) Bekir Türkgeldi	22	0	7	0	29	0
-	DF	(Turkey) Ural Metiner	4	0	2	0	6	0
-	MF	(Turkey) Turan Doğangün	30	4	8	3	38	7
-	MF	(Turkey) Onursal Uraz	18	0	3	0	21	0
-	MF	(Turkey) Mehmet Oğuz	17	3	4	1	21	4
-	MF	(Turkey) Talat Özkarslı	28	1	4	0	32	1
-	MF	(Turkey) Mustafa Yürür	24	0	8	1	32	1
-	FW	(Turkey) Ayhan Elmastaşoğlu	29	7	7	0	36	7
-	FW	(Turkey) Uğur Köken	30	3	8	3	38	6
-	FW	(Turkey) Yılmaz Gökdel	29	2	5	0	34	2
-	FW	(Turkey) Naşit Atvur	0	0	1	0	1	0
-	FW	(Turkey) Ergin Gürses	0	0	1	0	1	0
-	FW	(Socialist Federal Republic of Yugoslavia) Vladimir Nikolovski	1	0	0	0	1	0
9	FW	(Turkey) Gökmen Özdenak	19	2	6	3	25	5
10	FW	(Turkey) Metin Oktay(C)	27	18	6	3	33	21

=== Players in / out ===
==== In ====
Pos.	Nat.	Name	Age	Moving from
GK	(Turkey)	Yasin Özdenak	19	Istanbulspor
FW	(Turkey)	Gökmen Özdenak	20	Istanbulspor
FW	(Turkey)	Mehmet Oğuz	18	Galatasaray A2
MF	(Turkey)	Mehmet Oğuz	18	Galatasaray A2
MF	(Turkey)	Onursal Uraz	23	Hacettepe S.K.
GK	(Socialist Federal Republic of Yugoslavia)	Tatomir Radunovic	27	Crvena Zvezda

==== Out ====
Pos.	Nat.	Name	Age	Moving from
GK	(Turkey)	Turgay Şeren	35	retired
FW	(Turkey)	Tarık Kutver	27	Mersin İdmanyurdu

== 1.Lig ==
=== Standings ===
Pos	Team	Pld	W	D	L	GF	GA	GD	Pts	Qualification or relegation
1	Fenerbahçe (C)	32	19	11	2	38	12	+26	49	Qualification to European Cup first round
2	Beşiktaş	32	15	12	5	42	24	+18	42	
3	Galatasaray	32	13	10	9	44	36	+8	36	
4	Göztepe A.Ş.	32	13	9	10	46	34	+12	35	Invitation to Inter-Cities Fairs Cup first round
5	Altay	32	11	13	8	37	30	+7	35	Qualification to Cup Winners' Cup first round

Rules for classification: 1) points; 2) goal difference; 3) number of goals scored.
(C) Champions

=== Matches ===
10 September 1967 1	Mersin İdmanyurdu	1–2	Galatasaray SK	Mersin
16:00 EET	Osman Arpacıoğlu 67'	(Report)	Metin Oktay 7'; Ergün Acuner 76'	Stadium: Tevfik Sırrı Gür Stadı; Referee: Muzaffer Sarvan

17 September 1967 2	Galatasaray SK	1–3	Feriköy S.K.	Istanbul
15:30 EET	Metin Oktay 6' (pen.)	(Report)	İsmet Yurtsü 22', 52'; Bilgin Nesil 49'	Stadium: Ali Sami Yen Stadi; Attendance: n/a Referee: Nejat Şener

23 September 1967 3	Vefa SK	0–1	Galatasaray SK	Istanbul
15:00 EET		(Report)	Metin Oktay 8'	Stadium: Ali Sami Yen Stadi; Attendance: 13,443; Referee: Vasile Dumitrescu

1 October 1967 4	Altınordu F.K.	0–1	Galatasaray SK	İzmir
16:00 EET		(Report)	Metin Oktay 35'	Stadium: Alsancak Stadı; Attendance: 18,529; Referee: Necdet Oralalp

8 October 1967 5	Galatasaray SK	0–2	Fenerbahçe SK	Istanbul
15:00 EET		(Report)	Yaşar Mumcuoğlu 11'; Ercan Aktuna 54' (pen.)	Stadium: Ali Sami Yen Stadi; Attendance: 34,549; Referee: Nejat Şener

15 October 1967 6	Galatasaray SK	0–0	Göztepe SK	Istanbul
14:45 EET		(Report)		Stadium: Ali Sami Yen Stadi; Attendance: 28,170; Referee: Veli Necdet Arığ

22 October 1967 7	Hacettepe S.K.	0–0	Galatasaray SK	Ankara
14:45 EET		(Report)		Stadium: 19 Mayıs Stadı; Attendance: n/a Referee: Orhan Gönül

29 October 1967 8	Galatasaray SK	1–1	Eskişehirspor	Istanbul
14:30 EET	Metin Oktay 65'	(Report)	Nihat Atacan 77'	Stadium: Ali Sami Yen Stadi; Attendance: 26,366; Referee: Necdet Oralalp

5 November 1967 9	Altay SK	2–1	Galatasaray SK	İzmir
14:45 EET	Doğan Akı 5'; Behzat Çınar 38'	(Report)	Turan Doğangün 34'	Stadium: Alsancak Stadı; Attendance: n/a Referee: Sabahattin Ladikli

11 November 1967 10	Galatasaray SK	0–0	PTT SK	Istanbul
14:15 EET		(Report)		Stadium: Ali Sami Yen Stadi; Attendance: n/a Referee: Fehmi Pazarcı

19 November 1967 11	Galatasaray SK	1–1	Bursaspor	Istanbul
14:30 EET	Uğur Köken 50'	(Report)	Ersel Altıparmak 1'	Stadium: Ali Sami Yen Stadi; Attendance: n/a Referee: Muzaffer Sarvan

3 December 1967 12	Şekerspor	0–1	Galatasaray SK	Ankara
14:15 EET		(Report)	Metin Oktay 22'	Stadium: 19 Mayıs Stadı; Attendance: n/a Referee: Müşfik Talas

9 December 1967 13	Galatasaray SK	0–1	Gençlerbirliği SK	Istanbul
14:00 EET		(Report)	Salim Görür 40'	Stadium: Ali Sami Yen Stadi; Attendance: n/a Referee: Orhan Gönül

17 December 1967 14	MKE Ankaragücü SK	3–3	Galatasaray SK	Ankara
14:00 EET	Selçuk Yalçıntaş 16'; Candan Dumanlı 61'; Yılmaz Yücetürk 75'	(Report)	Metin Oktay 57'; Mehmet Oğuz 63', 66'	Stadium: 19 Mayıs Stadı; Attendance: n/a Referee: Müşfik Talas

30 December 1967 15	Galatasaray SK	1–0	Ankara Demirspor	Istanbul
14:00 EET	Metin Oktay 27'	(Report)		Stadium: Ali Sami Yen Stadi; Attendance: n/a Referee: Orhan Gönül

7 January 1968 16	Galatasaray SK	1–1	Beşiktaş JK	Istanbul
14:00 EET	Ergün Acuner 70'	(Report)	Ahmet Özacar 15'	Stadium: Mithatpaşa Stadi; Attendance: n/a Referee: Willi Thier

4 February 1968 17	Galatasaray SK	3–0	Mersin İdmanyurdu	Istanbul
14:45 EET	Ayhan Elmastaşoğlu 50', 53', 59'	(Report)		Stadium: Mithatpaşa Stadi; Attendance: n/a Referee: Orhan Gönül

10 February 1968 18	Feriköy S.K.	0–4	Galatasaray SK	Istanbul
14:30 EET		(Report)	Metin Oktay 29'; Ayhan Elmastaşoğlu 50', 62'; Doğan Sel 83'	Stadium: Mithatpaşa Stadi; Attendance: n/a Referee: Faruk Talu

18 February 1968 19	Galatasaray SK	5–2	Vefa SK	Istanbul
12:30 EET	Metin Oktay 4', 48', 87' (pen.); Turan Doğangün 15'; Mehmet Oğuz 53'	(Report)	Bekir Psav 10'; Suat Mamat 35'	Stadium: Mithatpaşa Stadi; Attendance: 41,862; Referee: Nejat Şener

25 February 1968 20	Galatasaray SK	1–0	Altınordu F.K.	Istanbul
14:30 EET	Turan Doğangün 12'	(Report)		Stadium: Mithatpaşa Stadi; Attendance: n/a Referee: Ziya Türkdoğan

3 March 1968 21	Fenerbahçe SK	3–0	Galatasaray SK	Istanbul
14:45 EET	Ogün Altıparmak 9'; Yaşar Mumcuoğlu 35'; Abdullah Çevrim 47'	(Report)		Stadium: Mithatpaşa Stadi; Attendance: 41,835; Referee: Franz Wöhrer

10 March 1968 22	Göztepe SK	2–1	Galatasaray SK	İzmir
15:00 EET	Fevzi Zemzem 22'; Cenap Öztezel 37'	(Report)	Uğur Köken 38'	Stadium: Alsancak Stadı; Attendance: n/a Referee: Sabahattin Ladikli

17 March 1968 23	Galatasaray SK	1–0	Hacettepe SK	Istanbul
14:45 EET	Talat Özkarslı 86'	(Report)		Stadium: Ali Sami Yen Stadi; Attendance: n/a Referee: Muzaffer Sarvan

24 March 1968 24	Eskişehirspor	0–1	Galatasaray SK	Eskişehir
14:45 EET		(Report)	Ayhan Elmastaşoğlu 65'	Stadium: Atatürk Stadı); Attendance: n/a Referee: Veli Necdet Arığ

31 March 1968 25	Galatasaray SK	1–2	Altay SK	Istanbul
14:45 EET	Yılmaz Gökdel 40'	(Report)	Behzat Çınar 25'; Ayfer Elmastaşoğlu 52'	Stadium: Ali Sami Yen Stadi; Attendance: n/a Referee: Nevzat Tansuk

7 April 1968 26	PTT SK	1–1	Galatasaray SK	Ankara
14:45 EET	Ertan Adatepe 11'	(Report)	Ergün Acuner 69' (pen.)	Stadium: 19 Mayıs Stadı; Attendance: n/a Referee: Orhan Gönül

14 April 1968 27	Bursaspor	2–2	Galatasaray SK	Bursa
15:00 EET	Haluk Erdemoğlu 42', 86'	(Report)	Metin Oktay 25'; Gökmen Özdenak 82'	Stadium: Atatürk Stadı; Attendance: n/a Referee: Ertuğrul Dilek

21 April 1968 28	Galatasaray SK	1–0	Şekerspor	Istanbul
15:15 EET	Ayhan Elmastaşoğlu 45'	(Report)		Stadium: Ali Sami Yen Stadi; Attendance: n/a Referee: Muzaffer Sarvan

28 April 1968 29	Gençlerbirliği SK	2–1	Galatasaray SK	Ankara
15:00 EET	Salim Görür 6'; Temel Keskindemir 50'	(Report)	Metin Oktay 89'	Stadium: 19 Mayıs Stadı; Attendance: n/a Referee: Muzaffer Sarvan

5 May 1968 30	Galatasaray SK	2–0	MKE Ankaragücü SK	Istanbul
15:45 EET	Yılmaz Gökdel 65'; Gökmen Özdenak 87'	(Report)		Stadium: Ali Sami Yen Stadı; Attendance: n/a Referee: Fehmi Pazarcı

19 May 1968 31	Ankara Demirspor	3–2	Galatasaray SK	Ankara
17:45 EET	Muzaffer Sipahi 48'; Sedat Boğaz 66'; Birol Aşar 71'	(Report)	Metin Oktay 44', 52'	Stadium: 19 Mayıs Stadı; Attendance: n/a Referee: Jan Redelfs

26 May 1968 32	Beşiktaş JK	4–4	Galatasaray SK	Istanbul
16:00 EET	Sanlı Sarıalioğlu 24', 64'; Ahmet Şahin 85'; Ahmet Özacar 88'	(Report)	Metin Oktay 35', 39'; Turan Doğangün 59'; Uğur Köken 73'	Stadium: Ali Sami Yen Stadi; Attendance: n/a Referee: Faruk Talu

== Türkiye Kupası ==
Kick-off listed in local time (EET)

=== 1st round ===
25 October 1967 1	Adana Milli Mensucat	1–3	Galatasaray SK	Adana
14:45 EET	Ayhan 57' (pen.)	(Report)	Turan Doğangün 38', 82'; Metin Oktay 77'	Stadium: Şehir Stadı; Attendance: n/a Referee: Zülbahar Sağnak

1 November 1967 2	Galatasaray SK	6–0	Adana Milli Mensucat	Istanbul
12:30 EET	Uğur Köken 10'; Gökmen Özdenak 13', 83'; Mehmet Oğuz 56'; Turan Doğangün 78'; Mustafa Yürür 85'	(Report)		Stadium: Ali Sami Yen Stadi; Attendance: n/a Referee: Nadi Irmaklar

=== 2nd round ===
21 January 1968 1	Altınordu F.K.	2–1	Galatasaray SK	İzmir
14:30 EET	Dragoljup Siyatski 27'; Vinko Zadel 89'	(Report)	Ergün Acuner 55'	Stadium: Alsancak Stadı; Attendance: n/a Referee: Necdet Oralalp

27 January 1968 2	Galatasaray SK	2–0	Altınordu F.K.	Istanbul
14:00 EET	Ergün Acuner 6'; Metin Oktay 53'	(Report)		Stadium: Mithatpaşa Stadi; Attendance: 10,358; Referee: Veli Necdet Arığ

=== 1/4 Final ===
20 March 1968 1	Bandırmaspor	2–1	Galatasaray SK	Bandırma
14:00 EET		(Report)		Stadium: 17 Eylül Stadı; Attendance: n/a Referee: Nevzat Tansuk

10 April 1968 2	Galatasaray SK	2–0	Bandırmaspor	Istanbul
14:00 EET	Gökmen Özdenak 55'; Metin Oktay 72'	(Report)		Stadium: Mithatpaşa Stadi; Attendance: n/a Referee: Hamza Özdağ

=== 1/2 Final ===
1 June 1968 1	Galatasaray SK	2–0	Altay S.K.	Istanbul
16:15 EET	Uğur Köken 68', 70'	(Report)	Mustafa Denizli 22'	Stadium: Mithatpaşa Stadi; Attendance: n/a Referee: Ferdinand Biwersi

9 June 1968 2	Altay SK	2–0	Galatasaray SK	İzmir
14:30 EET	Feridun Öztürk 42'; Mustafa Denizli 115'	(Report)		Stadium: Alsancak Stadı; Referee: Gonel Asergio

== Friendly Matches ==
=== TSYD Kupası ===
20 August 1967 1	Galatasaray SK	1–0	Beşiktaş JK	Istanbul
20:30 EET	Turan Doğangün 71'	(Report)		Stadium: Mithatpaşa Stadi; Referee: Ömer Karadağ

23 August 1967 2	Fenerbahçe SK	1–2	Galatasaray SK	Istanbul
20:30 EET	Nedim Doğan 38'	(Report)	Ayhan Elmastaşoğlu 13', 50'	Stadium: Mithatpaşa Stadi; Referee: Doğan Babacan

== Attendance ==
Competition	Av. Att.	Total Att.
1. Lig	32,737	130,947
Türkiye Kupası	10,358	10,358
Total	28,261	141,305
