= 1964–65 Galatasaray S.K. season =

Galatasaray
1964–65 season
- President: (Turkey) Ulvi Yenal (until 13 February 1965) (Turkey) Suphi Batur
- Manager: (Turkey) Coşkun Özarı (until 20 September 1964) (Turkey) Gündüz Kılıç
- Stadium: Mithatpaşa Stadi
- 1.Lig: 3rd
- Türkiye Kupası: Winner
- CWC: Second round
- Top goalscorer: League: Metin Oktay (17); All: Metin Oktay (23)
- Highest home attendance: 43,735 vs Fenerbahçe SK (1. Lig, 3 January 1965)
- Lowest home attendance: 5,925 vs Hacettepe SK (1. Lig, 11 April 1965)
- Average home league attendance: 16,076
Home colours	Away colours

The 1964–65 season was Galatasaray's 61st in existence and the 7th consecutive season in the 1. Lig. This article shows statistics of the club's players in the season, and also lists all matches that the club have played in the season.

== Squad statistics ==
No.	Pos.	Name	1. Lig		Türkiye Kupası		CWC		Total	
No.	Pos.	Name	Apps	Goals	Apps	Goals	Apps	Goals	Apps	Goals
1	GK	(Turkey) Turgay Şeren(C)	7	0	0	0	3	0	10	0
-	GK	(Turkey) Erdem Arat	3	0	1	0	0	0	4	0
-	GK	(Turkey) Bülent Gürbüz	19	0	5	0	3	0	27	0
-	GK	(Turkey) Aydoğan Tunay	1	0	0	0	0	0	1	0
-	GK	(Turkey) Ergün Acuner	0	0	1	0	0	0	1	0
-	DF	(Turkey) Doğan Sel	25	0	6	0	6	0	37	0
-	DF	(Turkey) Naci Erdem	26	0	6	0	6	0	38	0
-	DF	(Turkey) İsmail Şerbetçigil	1	0	0	0	0	0	1	0
-	DF	(Turkey) Candemir Berkman	22	0	3	0	4	0	29	0
-	DF	(Turkey) Ahmet Karlıklı	1	0	1	0	0	0	2	0
-	DF	(Turkey) Ergun Ercins	2	0	0	0	0	0	2	0
-	MF	(Turkey) Bahri Altıntabak	10	3	3	0	0	0	13	3
-	MF	(Turkey) Talat Özkarslı	0	0	0	0	5	0	5	0
-	MF	(Turkey) Necdet Atsüren	4	0	0	0	0	0	4	0
-	MF	(Turkey) Erol Boralı	14	2	0	0	0	0	14	2
-	DF	(Turkey) İsmet Yurtsü	15	0	4	1	2	0	21	1
-	DF	(Turkey) Turan Doğangün	19	8	3	0	4	1	26	9
-	MF	(Turkey) Mustafa Yürür	22	2	5	0	3	0	30	2
-	FW	(Turkey) Ahmet Berman	29	0	2	0	5	0	36	0
-	FW	(Turkey) Ayhan Elmastaşoğlu	10	7	5	1	0	0	15	8
-	FW	(Turkey) Uğur Köken	0	0	0	0	6	1	6	1
-	FW	(Turkey) Yılmaz Gökdel	29	3	6	0	4	0	39	3
-	FW	(Turkey) Tarık Kutver	27	5	5	1	6	0	38	6
-	FW	(Turkey) Ahmet Tuna Kozan	0	0	1	0	0	0	1	0
-	FW	(Turkey) Kadri Aytaç	21	4	3	0	3	0	27	4
-	FW	(Turkey) Mazhar Güremek	1	0	0	0	0	0	1	0
10	FW	(Turkey) Metin Oktay	22	17	6	3	6	3	34	23

=== Players in / out ===
==== In ====
Pos.	Nat.	Name	Age	Moving from
DF	(Turkey)	Naci Erdem	33	Fenerbahçe SK
MF	(Turkey)	İsmet Yurtsü	26	Feriköy SK
GK	(Turkey)	Erdem Arat	18	Mersin İdmanyurdu

==== Out ====
Pos.	Nat.	Name	Age	Moving from
FW	(Turkey)	Nuri Asan	24	MKE Ankaragücü SK
FW	(Turkey)	İbrahim Ünal	29	MKE Ankaragücü SK
FW	(Turkey)	Erdoğan Gökçen	30	Vefa SK

== 1.Lig ==
=== Standings ===
Pos	Team	Pld	W	D	L	GF	GA	GR	Pts	Qualification or relegation
1	Fenerbahçe (C)	30	18	11	1	52	13	4.000	47	Qualification to European Cup preliminary round and invitation to Balkans Cup
2	Beşiktaş	30	16	9	5	46	17	2.706	41	
3	Galatasaray	30	14	11	5	51	31	1.645	39	Qualification to Cup Winners' Cup first round
4	Göztepe	30	11	9	10	31	33	0.939	31	Invitation to Inter-Cities Fairs Cup first round
5	İstanbulspor	30	10	10	10	28	29	0.966	30	

Rules for classification: 1. Points 2. Goal ratio
(C) Champions

=== Matches ===
5 September 1964 1	Galatasaray SK	4–0	Feriköy SK	Istanbul
17:00 EET	Metin Oktay 43', 63' (pen.); Turan Doğangün 65'; Yılmaz Gökdel 66'	(Report)		Stadium: Mithatpaşa Stadi; Attendance: 8,968; Referee: Doğan Babacan

19 September 1964 2	Galatasaray SK	0–0	MKE Ankaragücü SK	Istanbul
17:00 EET		(Report)		Stadium: Mithatpaşa Stadi; Attendance: 8,751; Referee: Mustafa Gerçeker

20 September 1964 3	Galatasaray SK	1–1	Ankara Demirspor	Istanbul
17:00 EET	Metin Oktay 9' (pen.)	(Report)	Abdülrezzak Tığ 4'	Stadium: Mithatpaşa Stadi; Attendance: 9,033; Referee: Hakkı Gürüz

10 October 1964 4	Galatasaray SK	3–1	İstanbulspor	Istanbul
15:15 EET	Metin Oktay 19', 52'; Erol Boralı 28'	(Report)	Haluk Erdemoğlu 40'	Stadium: Mithatpaşa Stadi; Attendance: n/a Referee: Hakkı Çaktırma

17 October 1964 5	Galatasaray SK	1–1	Altay SK	Istanbul
15:00 EET	Turan Doğangün 48'	(Report)	Feridun Öztürk 87'	Stadium: Mithatpaşa Stadi; Attendance: 14,644; Referee: Nejat Şener

18 October 1964 6	Galatasaray SK	3–2	Göztepe SK	Istanbul
15:00 EET	Kadri Aytaç 20', 45'; Erol Boralı 46'	(Report)	Nihat Yayöz 71'; Fevzi Zemzem 81'	Stadium: Mithatpaşa Stadi; Attendance: 13,736; Referee: Sabahattin Ladikli

29 October 1964 7	Galatasaray SK	1–0	Beşiktaş JK	Istanbul
14:45 EET	Turan Doğangün 58'	(Report)		Stadium: Mithatpaşa Stadi; Attendance: 41,673; Referee: Muzaffer Sarvan

7 November 1964 8	PTT SK	1–0	Galatasaray SK	Ankara
14:45 EET	Doğan Sel 46' (o.g.)	(Report)		Stadium: 19 Mayıs Stadı; Attendance: 7,937; Referee: Hakkı Gürüz

8 November 1964 9	Gençlerbirliği SK	2–1	Galatasaray SK	Ankara
14:45 EET	Zeynel Soyuer 44'; Abdullah Çevrim 80'	(Report)	Tarık Kutver 60'	Stadium: 19 Mayıs Stadı; Attendance: n/a Referee: Muzaffer Sarvan

14 November 1964 10	Galatasaray SK	1–0	Beykoz 1908 SKD	Istanbul
14:00 EET	Turan Doğangün 1'	(Report)		Stadium: Mithatpaşa Stadi; Attendance: 6,648; Referee: Ahmet Bagatır

28 November 1964 11	Hacettepe SK	1–0	Galatasaray SK	Ankara
14:30 EET	Çetin Güler 87'	(Report)		Stadium: 19 Mayıs Stadı; Attendance: n/a Referee: Nejat Şener

12 December 1964 12	Altınordu SK	2–1	Galatasaray SK	İzmir
14:30 EET	Muhterem Ar 38' (pen.); Cenap Genç 47'	(Report)	Metin Oktay 18'	Stadium: Alsancak Stadium; Attendance: 13,706; Referee: Mustafa Gerçeker

13 December 1964 13	İzmirspor	0–5	Galatasaray SK	İzmir
14:30 EET		(Report)	Metin Oktay 12', 44'; Turan Doğangün 18'; Bahri Altıntabak 42'; Tarık Kutver 71'	Stadium: Alsancak Stadium; Attendance: 8,432; Referee: Cezmi Başar

3 January 1965 14	Galatasaray SK	1–1	Fenerbahçe SK	Istanbul
14:00 EET	Turan Doğangü 69'	(Report)	Aydın Yelken 25'	Stadium: Mithatpaşa Stadi; Attendance: 43,735; Referee: Bruno De Marchi

10 January 1965 15	Şeker SK	0–0	Galatasaray SK	Ankara
14:00 EET		(Report)		Stadium: 19 Mayıs Stadı; Attendance: n/a Referee: Muzaffer Sarvan

30 January 1965 16	Feriköy SK	1–0	Galatasaray SK	Istanbul
14:00 EET	Tuncer İnceler 41' (pen.)	(Report)		Stadium: Mithatpaşa Stadi; Attendance: 8,142; Referee: Faruk Talu

14 February 1965 17	Beşiktaş JK	2–3	Galatasaray SK	Istanbul
14:30 EET	Yusuf Tunaoğlu 35'; Coşkun Ehlidil 58'	(Report)	Metin Oktay 60' (pen.); Tarık Kutver 61', 70'	Stadium: Mithatpaşa Stadi; Attendance: 27,778; Referee: Alexandru Toth

27 February 1965 18	Ankara Demirspor	1–1	Galatasaray SK	Ankara
15:00 EET	Teoman Yamanlar 83'	(Report)	Metin Oktay 57'	Stadium: 19 Mayıs Stadı; Attendance: 13,060; Referee: Muzaffer Sarvan

28 February 1965 19	MKE Ankaragücü SK	3–3	Galatasaray SK	Ankara
15:00 EET	Ertan Adatepe 39', 48', 52'	(Report)	Yılmaz Gökdel 4'; Turan Doğangün 37'; Tarık Kutver 44'	Stadium: 19 Mayıs Stadı; Attendance: 18,887; Referee: Abdi Parlakay

6 March 1965 20	Istanbulspor	1–4	Galatasaray SK	Istanbul
14:30 EET	Kosta Kasapoğlu 25'	(Report)	Ayhan Elmastaşoğlu 9'; Metin Oktay 22'; Yılmaz Gökdel 52'; Mustafa Yürür 60'	Stadium: Mithatpaşa Stadi; Attendance: 13,773; Referee: Zeki Gürkan

13 March 1965 21	Galatasaray SK	1–0	Altınordu SK	Istanbul
15:30 EET	Metin Oktay 21'	(Report)		Stadium: Mithatpaşa Stadi; Attendance: 16,157; Referee: Zülbahar Sağnak

14 March 1965 22	Galatasaray SK	3–1	İzmirspor	Istanbul
15:30 EET	Ayhan Elmastaşoğlu 6', 90'; Metin Oktay 67' (pen.)	(Report)	Naci Erdem 10' (o.g.)	Stadium: Mithatpaşa Stadi; Attendance: 18,387; Referee: Veli Necdet Arığ

21 March 1965 23	Fenerbahçe SK	1–1	Galatasaray SK	Istanbul
15:30 EET	Yıldırım İper 50'	(Report)	Metin Oktay 20'	Stadium: Mithatpaşa Stadi; Attendance: 42,028; Referee: Octavian Costa

10 April 1965 24	Galatasaray SK	2–1	Şeker SK	Istanbul
15:15 EET	Metin Oktay 17', 65'	(Report)	Muharrem Domaniçdağ 71' (pen.)	Stadium: Mithatpaşa Stadi; Attendance: 10,791; Referee: Abdi Parlakay

11 April 1965 25	Galatasaray SK	1–0	Hacettepe SK	Istanbul
15:00 EET	Metin Oktay 60' (pen.)	(Report)		Stadium: Mithatpaşa Stadi; Attendance: 5,925; Referee: Kemal Yavman

21 April 1965 26	Beykoz 1908 SKD	1–2	Galatasaray SK	Istanbul
20:00 EET	Cemal Topaloğlu 44'	(Report)	Mustafa Yürür 16'; Ayhan Elmastaşoğlu 77'	Stadium: Mithatpaşa Stadi; Attendance: n/a Referee: Nejat Şener

29 May 1965 27	Galatasaray SK	3–2	Gençlerbirliği SK	Istanbul
15:45 EET	Bahri Altıntabak 35', 43'; Kadri Aytaç 40'	(Report)	Vural Olşen 8'; Orhan Yüksel 32'	Stadium: Mithatpaşa Stadi; Attendance: 10,543; Referee: Orhan Gönül

30 May 1965 28	Galatasaray SK	1–1	PTT SK	Istanbul
15:45 EET	Kadri Aytaç 27' (pen.)	(Report)	Yusuf Katırcıoğlu 26' (pen.)	Stadium: Mithatpaşa Stadi; Attendance: n/a Referee: Nejat Şener

5 June 1965 29	Göztepe SK	3–3	Galatasaray SK	İzmir
16:00 EET	Sabahattin Kuruoğlu 35'; Nihat Yayöz 49'; Fevzi Zemzem 53'	(Report)	Ayhan Elmastaşoğlu 13', 31'; Turan Doğangün 84'	Stadium: Alsancak Stadium; Attendance: 8,781; Referee: Necdet Oralalp

6 June 1965 30	Altay SK	1–1	Galatasaray SK	İzmir
16:00 EET	Bekir Türkgeldi 69'	(Report)	Ayhan Elmastaşoğlu 26'	Stadium: Alsancak Stadium; Attendance: n/a Referee: Abdi Parlakay

== Türkiye Kupası ==
Kick-off listed in local time (EET)

=== 1/4 final ===
21 February 1965 1	MKE Ankaragücü SK	0–1	Galatasaray SK	Ankara
14:45 EET		(Report)	Tarık Kutver 57'	Stadium: 19 Mayıs Stadı; Attendance: 13,719; Referee: Hakkı Gürüz

28 March 1965 2	Galatasaray SK	1–0	MKE Ankaragücü SK	Istanbul
20:00 EET	Metin Oktay 22' (pen.)	(Report)		Stadium: Mithatpaşa Stadi; Attendance: 6,706; Referee: Hakkı Çaktırma

=== 1/2 final ===
12 June 1965 1	Galatasaray SK	1–1	Ankara Demirspor	Istanbul
17:30 EET	Ayhan Elmastaşoğlu 52'	(Report)	Birol Aşar 42'	Stadium: Mithatpaşa Stadi; Referee: Konstantin Dinov

20 June 1965 2	Ankara Demirspor	1–2	Galatasaray SK	Ankara
17:00 EET	Abdülrezzak Tığ 16'	(Report)	Metin Oktay 73'; İsmet Yurtsü 89'	Stadium: 19 Mayıs Stadı; Attendance: 18,945; Referee: Stoian Chomakov

=== Final ===
27 June 1965 1	Fenerbahçe SK	0–0	Galatasaray SK	Istanbul
20:30 EET		(Report)		Stadium: Mithatpaşa Stadi; Attendance: 34,302; Referee: Gaston Rowersi

1 September 1965 2	Galatasaray SK	1–0	Fenerbahçe SK	Istanbul
20:00 EET	Metin Oktay 33' (pen.)	(Report)		Stadium: Mithatpaşa Stadi; Attendance: 24,973; Referee: Nejat Şener

== European Cup ==
=== First round ===
19 September 1964 1	1. FC Magdeburg	1–1	Galatasaray SK	Magdeburg
EET	Peter Heuer 13'	(Report)	Turan Doğangün 52'	Stadium: Ernst Grube Stadium; Referee: (Netherlands) Pieter Paulus Roomer

17 September 1964 2	Galatasaray SK	1–1	1. FC Magdeburg	Istanbul
EET	Uğur Köken 26'	(Report)	Peter Heuer 74'	Stadium: Mithatpaşa Stadi; Attendance: 29,207; Referee: (Socialist Federal Republic of Yugoslavia) Vladimir Stankovic

7 October 1964 3	Galatasaray SK	1–1	1. FC Magdeburg	Vienna
EET	Metin Oktay 81'	(Report)	Wilfried Klingbiel 62'	Stadium: Hohe Warte Stadium; Referee: (Austria) Alfred Haberfellner

=== Second round ===
18 November 1964 1	Legia Warsaw	2–1	Galatasaray SK	Warsaw
EET	Jacek Gmoch 69', 88'	(Report)	Metin Oktay 73'	Stadium: Polish Army Stadium; Referee: (Hungary) Gabor Soos

3 December 1964 2	Galatasaray SK	1–0	Legia Warsaw	Istanbul
EET	Metin Oktay 22'	(Report)		Stadium: Mithatpaşa Stadi; Attendance: 26,700; Referee: (Austria) Franz Mayer

10 December 1964 3	Legia Warsaw	1–0	Galatasaray SK	Bucharest
EET	Henryk Apostel 14'	(Report)		Stadium: Stadionul Național; Referee: (Romania) Nicolae Mihăilescu

== Friendly Matches ==
=== TSYD Kupası ===
19 August 1964 1	Fenerbahçe SK	1–1	Galatasaray SK	Istanbul
20:30 EET	Şeref Has 88'	(Report)	Bahri Altıntabak 29'	Stadium: Mithatpaşa Stadi; Attendance: 30,408; Referee: Cezmi Başar

30 August 1964 2	Galatasaray SK	2–2	Beşiktaş JK	Istanbul
20:30 EET	İsmet Yurtsü 10'; Yılmaz Gökdel 49'	(Report)	Ahmet Özacar 69'; Güven Önüt 88'	Stadium: Mithatpaşa Stadi; Attendance: 28,363; Referee: Nejat Şener

=== Ali Sami Yen - Şeref Bey Kupası ===
24 January 1965	Galatasaray SK	1–0	Beşiktaş JK	Istanbul
15:00 EET	Mazhar Güremek 80'	(Report)		Stadium: Mithatpaşa Stadi

=== Atatürk Kupası ===
2 July 1964	Fenerbahçe SK	3–1	Galatasaray SK	Istanbul
20:00 EET	Ogün Altıparmak 54', 65'; Şeref Has 83'	(Report)	Metin Oktay 38'	Stadium: Mithatpaşa Stadi; Attendance: 29,933; Referee: Muzaffer Sarvan

== Attendances ==
Competition	Av. Att.	Total Att.
1. Lig	16,076	208,991
Türkiye Kupası	15,840	31,679
CWC	27,954	55,907
Total	17,446	296,577
