= 1966–67 Galatasaray S.K. season =

Galatasaray
1966–67 season
- President: (Turkey) Suphi Batur
- Manager: (Turkey) Gündüz Kılıç
- Stadium: Ali Sami Yen Stadi; Mithatpaşa Stadi
- 1.Lig: 3rd
- Türkiye Kupası: 1/4 finalist
- Süper Kupa: Winners
- CWC: First round
- Top goalscorer: League: Ayhan Elmastaşoğlu (14); All: Ayhan Elmastaşoğlu (16)
- Highest home attendance: 35,664 vs Fenerbahçe SK (1. Lig, 2 April 1967)
- Lowest home attendance: 7,456 vs İzmirspor (1. Lig, 5 November 1966)
- Average home league attendance: 18,214
| Home colours | Away colours |

The 1966–67 season was Galatasaray's 63rd in existence and the 9th consecutive season in the 1. Lig. This article shows statistics of the club's players in the season, and also lists all matches that the club have played in the season.

== Squad statistics ==
| No. | Pos. | Name | 1. Lig | | Türkiye Kupası | | Süper Kupa | | CWC | | Total | |
| No. | Pos. | Name | Apps | Goals | Apps | Goals | Apps | Goals | Apps | Goals | Apps | Goals |
|---|---|---|---|---|---|---|---|---|---|---|---|---|
| 1 | GK | (Turkey) Turgay Şeren(C) | 10 | 0 | 2 | 0 | 0 | 0 | 2 | 0 | 14 | 0 |
| - | GK | (Turkey) Yervant Balcı | 1 | 0 | 0 | 0 | 0 | 0 | 0 | 0 | 1 | 0 |
| - | GK | (Turkey) Bülent Gürbüz | 22 | 0 | 0 | 0 | 1 | 0 | 0 | 0 | 23 | 0 |
| - | GK | (Turkey) Ergün Acuner | 30 | 4 | 1 | 1 | 1 | 0 | 2 | 1 | 34 | 6 |
| - | DF | (Turkey) Doğan Sel | 8 | 0 | 0 | 0 | 0 | 0 | 0 | 0 | 8 | 0 |
| - | DF | (Turkey) Tuncer İnceler | 15 | 0 | 2 | 0 | 1 | 0 | 2 | 0 | 20 | 0 |
| - | DF | (Turkey) Bekir Türkgeldi | 27 | 1 | 2 | 0 | 0 | 0 | 2 | 0 | 31 | 1 |
| - | MF | (Turkey) Bahri Altıntabak | 12 | 0 | 0 | 0 | 1 | 0 | 0 | 0 | 13 | 0 |
| - | MF | (Turkey) Talat Özkarslı | 27 | 0 | 2 | 0 | 0 | 0 | 2 | 0 | 31 | 0 |
| - | DF | (Turkey) Turan Doğangün | 29 | 1 | 2 | 0 | 1 | 1 | 2 | 0 | 34 | 2 |
| - | MF | (Turkey) Mustafa Yürür | 32 | 0 | 2 | 0 | 1 | 0 | 2 | 0 | 37 | 0 |
| - | FW | (Turkey) Ayhan Elmastaşoğlu | 28 | 14 | 2 | 0 | 1 | 1 | 2 | 1 | 33 | 16 |
| - | FW | (Turkey) Uğur Köken | 21 | 4 | 0 | 0 | 1 | 0 | 2 | 0 | 24 | 4 |
| - | FW | (Turkey) Yılmaz Gökdel | 23 | 5 | 1 | 0 | 1 | 0 | 2 | 1 | 27 | 6 |
| - | FW | (Turkey) Tarık Kutver | 16 | 7 | 2 | 0 | 0 | 0 | 0 | 0 | 18 | 7 |
| - | FW | (Turkey) Ahmet Tuna Kozan | 11 | 0 | 0 | 0 | 1 | 0 | 0 | 0 | 12 | 0 |
| - | FW | (Socialist Federal Republic of Yugoslavia) Vladimir Nikolovski | 3 | 0 | 0 | 0 | 0 | 0 | 0 | 0 | 3 | 0 |
| - | FW | (Turkey) Ergin Gürses | 21 | 6 | 1 | 0 | 0 | 0 | 2 | 0 | 24 | 6 |
| 10 | FW | (Turkey) Metin Oktay | 17 | 10 | 1 | 0 | 1 | 0 | 0 | 0 | 19 | 10 |

=== Players in / out ===
==== In ====
| Pos. | Nat. | Name | Age | Moving from |
|---|---|---|---|---|
| FW | (Socialist Federal Republic of Yugoslavia) | Vladimir Nikolovski | 28 | |

==== Out ====
| Pos. | Nat. | Name | Age | Moving from |
|---|---|---|---|---|
| DF | (Turkey) | Naci Erdem | 35 | Edirnespor |

== 1.Lig ==
=== Standings ===
| Pos | Team | Pld | W | D | L | GF | GA | GD | Pts | Qualification or relegation |
|---|---|---|---|---|---|---|---|---|---|---|
| 1 | Beşiktaş (C) | 32 | 16 | 13 | 3 | 44 | 15 | +29 | 45 | Qualification to European Cup first round |
| 2 | Fenerbahçe | 32 | 17 | 9 | 6 | 37 | 20 | +17 | 43 | Invitation to Balkans Cup |
| 3 | Galatasaray | 32 | 12 | 17 | 3 | 53 | 33 | +20 | 41 | |
| 4 | Göztepe A.Ş. | 32 | 14 | 10 | 8 | 47 | 31 | +16 | 38 | Invitation to Inter-Cities Fairs Cup first round |
| 5 | Altay | 32 | 11 | 10 | 11 | 27 | 27 | 0 | 32 | Qualification to Cup Winners' Cup first round |

Rules for classification: 1) points; 2) goal difference; 3) number of goals scored.
(C) Champions

=== Matches ===
| 11 September 1966 1 | Hacettepe S.K. | 1–1 | Galatasaray SK | Ankara |
| 16:00 EET | Rıza Bayrı 25' | (Report) | Ergün Acuner 28' | Stadium: 19 Mayıs Stadı; Attendance: 23,309; Referee: Muzaffer Sarvan |

| 18 September 1966 2 | Galatasaray SK | 3–3 | Gençlerbirliği SK | Istanbul |
| 16:00 EET | Uğur Köken 1'; Ergün Acuner 71'; Yılmaz Gökdel 78' | (Report) | Hayrettin Endersert 59'; Salim Görür 87', 88' | Stadium: Ali Sami Yen Stadi; Attendance: 21,996; Referee: Abdi Parlakay |

| 25 September 1966 3 | Galatasaray SK | 3–2 | Vefa SK | Istanbul |
| 15:45 EET | Metin Oktay 19', 64'; Ayhan Elmastaşoğlu 77' | (Report) | Abdülmetin Kocaoğlu 29'; Ergun Ercins 65' (pen.) | Stadium: Ali Sami Yen Stadi; Attendance: 33,136; Referee: Ömer Karadağ |

| 9 October 1966 4 | Beşiktaş JK | 2–2 | Galatasaray SK | Istanbul |
| 15:30 EET | Güven Önüt 50'; Yusuf Tunaoğlu 61' | (Report) | Turan Doğangün 20'; Ayhan Elmastaşoğlu 29' | Stadium: Ali Sami Yen Stadi; Attendance: 29,568; Referee: Faruk Talu |

| 23 October 1966 5 | Göztepe SK | 2–1 | Galatasaray SK | İzmir |
| 15:00 EET | Gürsel Aksel 13'; Fevzi Zemzem 25' | (Report) | Yılmaz Gökdel 28' | Stadium: Alsancak Stadı; Attendance: n/a Referee: Necdet Oralalp |

| 30 October 1966 6 | Galatasaray SK | 3–1 | Altınordu F.K. | Istanbul |
| 15:00 EET | Ergin Gürses 32'; Ayhan Elmastaşoğlu 64', 70' | (Report) | Cenap Genç 3' | Stadium: Ali Sami Yen Stadi; Attendance: 23,422; Referee: Orhan Gönül |

| 5 November 1966 7 | Galatasaray SK | 1–1 | İzmirspor | Istanbul |
| 15:00 EET | Yılmaz Gökdel 29' | (Report) | Nazım Çamlıbel 27' | Stadium: Ali Sami Yen Stadi; Attendance: 7,456; Referee: Ertuğrul Dilek |

| 13 November 1966 8 | Fenerbahçe SK | 0–2 | Galatasaray SK | Istanbul |
| 14:30 EET | | (Report) | Tarık Kutver 12'; Ayhan Elmastaşoğlu 15' (pen.) | Stadium: Ali Sami Yen Stadi; Attendance: 34,240; Referee: Johannes Malka |

| 20 November 1966 9 | Ankara Demirspor | 1–1 | Galatasaray SK | Ankara |
| 14:30 EET | Fikri Elma 60' | (Report) | Ergin Gürses 33' | Stadium: 19 Mayıs Stadı; Attendance: n/a Referee: Muzaffer Sarvan |

| 26 November 1966 10 | Galatasaray SK | 2–1 | MKE Ankaragücü SK | Istanbul |
| 14:15 EET | Ergin Gürses 16'; Yılmaz Gökdel 50' | (Report) | Doğan Tepeçalı 29' | Stadium: Mithatpaşa Stadi; Attendance: 7,536; Referee: Orhan Gönül |

| 11 December 1966 11 | Galatasaray SK | 2–1 | İstanbulspor | Istanbul |
| 14:15 EET | Tarık Kutver 63', 80' | (Report) | Güngör Tetik 46' | Stadium: Mithatpaşa Stadi; Attendance: 21,929; Referee: Ahmet Bagatır |

| 25 December 1966 12 | Eskişehirspor | 2–2 | Galatasaray SK | Eskişehir |
| 14:00 EET | Mahmut Şölenişçi 16' (pen.); Fethi Heper 89' | (Report) | Ergün Acuner 21' (pen.); Tarık Kutver 60' | Stadium: Atatürk Stadı); Attendance: 17,500; Referee: Sabahattin Ladikli |

| 31 December 1966 13 | Galatasaray SK | 4–0 | Karşıyaka S.K. | Istanbul |
| 14:00 EET | Metin Oktay 43'; Özer Kanra 61' (o.g.); Ayhan Elmastaşoğlu 67'; Tarık Kutverl 89' | (Report) | | Stadium: Mithatpaşa Stadi; Attendance: 18,445; Referee: Ziya Türkdoğan |

| 4 January 1967 14 | Feriköy S.K. | 0–2 | Galatasaray SK | Istanbul |
| 20:00 EET | | (Report) | Ayhan Elmastaşoğlu 28'; Bekir Türkgeldi 53' | Stadium: Mithatpaşa Stadi; Attendance: 8,026; Referee: Rıfat Atakanı |

| 8 January 1967 15 | Altay SK | 2–0 | Galatasaray SK | İzmir |
| 14:00 EET | Aydın Yelken 5'; Ayfer Elmastaşoğlu 82' | (Report) | | Stadium: Alsancak Stadı; Attendance: n/a Referee: Veli Necdet Arığ |

| 14 January 1967 16 | Galatasaray SK | 2–1 | PTT SK | Istanbul |
| 14:00 EET | Ayhan Elmastaşoğlu 69'; Metin Oktay 74' (pen.) | (Report) | Zeki Kocaeli 85' | Stadium: Mithatpaşa Stadi; Attendance: 10,967; Referee: Orhan Gönül |

| 5 February 1967 17 | PTT SK | 0–0 | Galatasaray SK | Ankara |
| 14:15 EET | | (Report) | | Stadium: 19 Mayıs Stadı; Attendance: n/a Referee: İbrahim Fırla |

| 12 February 1967 18 | Galatasaray SK | 4–0 | Hacettepe SK | Istanbul |
| 14:30 EET | Yılmaz Gökdel 17'; Metin Oktay 21', 79'; Ayhan Elmastaşoğlu 64' | (Report) | | Stadium: Ali Sami Yen Stadi; Attendance: 8,051; Referee: Fehmi Pazarcı |

| 19 February 1967 19 | Gençlerbirliği SK | 1–1 | Galatasaray SK | Ankara |
| 14:30 EET | Salim Görür 53' | (Report) | Ayhan Elmastaşoğlu 74' | Stadium: 19 Mayıs Stadı; Attendance: n/a Referee: Muzaffer Sarvan |

| 26 February 1967 20 | Vefa SK | 1–1 | Galatasaray SK | Istanbul |
| 14:30 EET | Zeki Temizer 70' | (Report) | Ayhan Elmastaşoğlu 8' | Stadium: Ali Sami Yen Stadi; Attendance: 21,561; Referee: Faruk Talu |

| 5 March 1967 21 | Galatasaray SK | 1–1 | Beşiktaş JK | Istanbul |
| 14:45 EET | Ayhan Elmastaşoğlu 49' | (Report) | Ahmet Özacar 5' (pen.) | Stadium: Ali Sami Yen Stadi; Attendance: 28,425; Referee: Klaus Ohmsen |

| 11 March 1967 22 | Galatasaray SK | 0–0 | Göztepe SK | Istanbul |
| 14:45 EET | | (Report) | | Stadium: Ali Sami Yen Stadi; Attendance: n/a Referee: Gerd Henning |

| 19 March 1967 23 | Altınordu F.K. | 1–1 | Galatasaray SK | İzmir |
| 15:30 EET | Cengiz Kocatoros 70' | (Report) | Ayhan Elmastaşoğlu 42' | Stadium: Alsancak Stadı; Attendance: n/a Referee: Cezmi Başar |

| 26 March 1967 24 | İzmirspor | 0–0 | Galatasaray SK | İzmir |
| 15:30 EET | | (Report) | | Stadium: Alsancak Stadı; Attendance: n/a Referee: Karl Keller |

| 2 April 1967 25 | Galatasaray SK | 1–3 | Fenerbahçe SK | Istanbul |
| 15:30 EET | Ergün Acuner 26' | (Report) | Şeref Has 5'; Ogün Altıparmak 25'; Yaşar Mumcuoğlu 52' | Stadium: Ali Sami Yen Stadi; Attendance: 35,664; Referee: Günther Baumgaertel |

| 9 April 1967 26 | Galatasaray SK | 2–2 | Ankara Demirspor | Istanbul |
| 15:30 EET | Ergin Gürses 35'; Uğur Köken 54' | (Report) | Vural Yılmaz 39'; Birol Aşar 56' | Stadium: Ali Sami Yen Stadi; Attendance: 11,028; Referee: Josef Tittl |

| 16 April 1967 27 | MKE Ankaragücü SK | 0–0 | Galatasaray SK | Ankara |
| 15:15 EET | | (Report) | | Stadium: 19 Mayıs Stadı; Attendance: n/a Referee: Orhan Gönül |

| 30 April 1967 28 | Istanbulspor | 0–2 | Galatasaray SK | Istanbul |
| 15:30 EET | | (Report) | Uğur Köken 40', 78' | Stadium: Ali Sami Yen Stadi; Attendance: n/a Referee: Nejat Şener |

| 6 May 1967 29 | Galatasaray SK | 4–0 | Feriköy S.K. | Istanbul |
| 16:00 EET | Metin Oktay 50', 74', 82'; Tarık Kutver 65' | (Report) | | Stadium: Ali Sami Yen Stadi; Attendance: n/a Referee: Rıfat Atakanı |

| 21 May 1967 30 | Galatasaray SK | 2–2 | Eskişehirspor | Istanbul |
| 16:00 EET | Tarık Kutver 10'; Ayhan Elmastaşoğlu 54' | (Report) | Nihat Atacan 30'; Fethi Heper 81' | Stadium: Ali Sami Yen Stadi; Attendance: 8,721; Referee: Necdet Oralalp |

| 3 June 1967 31 | Galatasaray SK | 0–0 | Altay SK | Istanbul |
| 16:00 EET | | (Report) | | Stadium: Ali Sami Yen Stadi; Attendance: n/a Referee: Nevzat Tansuk |

| 11 June 1967 32 | Karşıyaka SK | 2–3 | Galatasaray SK | İzmir |
| 17:00 EET | Burhan Gürel 3'; Necip Sezer 22' | (Report) | Ergin Gürses 44'; Metin Oktay 82'; Ergin Gürses 84' | Stadium: Alsancak Stadı; Attendance: n/a Referee: Ziya Türkdoğan |

== Türkiye Kupası ==
Kick-off listed in local time (EET)

=== 1/4 final ===
| 26 April 1967 1 | Galatasaray SK | 0–0 | Altay SK | Istanbul |
| 15:30 EET | | (Report) | | Stadium: Ali Sami Yen Stadi; Attendance: 25,000; Referee: Max Spinnler |

| 14 May 1967 2 | Altay SK | 2–1 | Galatasaray SK | İzmir |
| 16:15 EET | Necdet Tunca 37'; Aytekin Erhanoğlu 62' | (Report) | Ergün Acuner 52' | Stadium: Alsancak Stadı; Referee: Paul Schiller |

== Süper Kupa ==
Kick-off listed in local time (EET)

| 21 September 1966 1 | Beşiktaş JK | 0–2 | Galatasaray SK | Ankara |
| 20:00 EET | | (Report) | Turan Doğangün 10'; Ayhan Elmastaşoğlu 13' | Stadium: 19 Mayıs Stadı; Attendance: 33,583; Referee: Sabahattin Ladikli |

== European Cup Winners' Cup ==
=== First round ===
| 24 August 1966 1 | SK Rapid Wien | 4–0 | Galatasaray SK | Wien |
| EET | Walter Seitl 7', 21'; Rudi Flögel 33'; Johnny Bjerregaard 63' | (Report) | | Stadium: Praterstadion; Attendance: 21,000; Referee: (Switzerland) Karl Göppel |

| 7 September 1966 2 | Galatasaray SK | 3–5 | SK Rapid Wien | Istanbul |
| EET | Ayhan Elmastaşoğlu 17'; Ergün Acuner 43'; Yılmaz Gökdel 88' | (Report) | Johnny Bjerregaard 21', 60'; Anton Fritsch 27'; Walter Seitl 36', 46' | Stadium: Ali Sami Yen Stadi; Attendance: 15,580; Referee: (Soviet Union) Kestutis Andziulis |

== Friendly Matches ==
=== TSYD Kupası ===
| 23 November 1966 1 | Galatasaray SK | 1–0 | Beşiktaş JK | Istanbul |
| 20:00 EET | Yılmaz Gökdel 10' | (Report) | | Stadium: Mithatpaşa Stadi; Attendance: 30,000; Referee: Ömer Karadağ |

| 1 December 1966 2 | Fenerbahçe SK | 0–1 | Galatasaray SK | Istanbul |
| 20:00 EET | | (Report) | Ergin Gürses 30' | Stadium: Mithatpaşa Stadi; Attendance: 30,993; Referee: Rıfat Atakanı |

=== Spor Toto Kupası ===
| 28 August 1966 1 | Galatasaray SK | 1–1 | Fenerbahçe SK | Istanbul |
| 15:00 EET | Ergün Acuner 25' | (Report) | Yaşar Mumcuoğlu 86' | Stadium: Ali Sami Yen Stadi; Attendance: 29,653 |

== Attendance ==
| Competition | Av. Att. | Total Att. |
|---|---|---|
| 1. Lig | 18,214 | 236,776 |
| Türkiye Kupası | 25,000 | 25,000 |
| CWC | 15,580 | 15,580 |
| Total | 18,490 | 277,356 |
