= Vangelis (disambiguation) =

Vangelis (1943–2022) was a Greek composer and musician.

Vangelis may also refer to:

- Vangelis (wrestler) (born 1981), Mexican professional wrestler
- Vangelis (given name), includes a list of people with the given name
- Lambros Vangelis (born 1982), Greek football midfielder
- 6354 Vangelis, a main-belt asteroid
