= Metin Oktay =

Turkish footballer

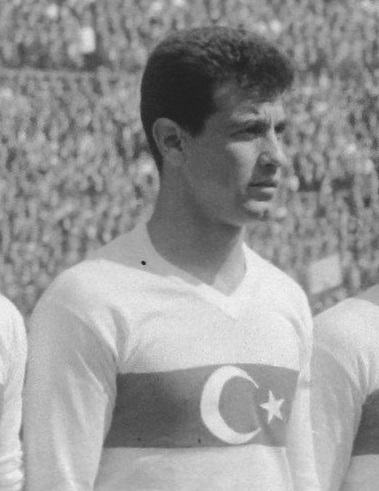
- Metin Oktay in 1958

Personal information
- Date of birth: 2 February 1936
- Place of birth: İzmir, Turkey
- Date of death: 13 September 1991 (aged 55)
- Place of death: Istanbul, Turkey
- Height: 1.77 m (5 ft 9 1/2 in)
- Position: Striker

Senior career*
Years	Team	Apps	(Gls)
1954–1955	İzmirspor	18	(17)
1955–1961	Galatasaray	164	(174)
1961–1962	Palermo	12	(3)
1962–1969	Galatasaray	180	(137)
Total		374	(331)

International career^{‡}
1954	Turkey U18	4	(3)
1955–1968	Turkey	36	(19)
- * Club domestic league appearances and goals as of 01:09, 23 October 2008 (UTC) ‡ National team caps and goals as of 01:09, 23 October 2008 (UTC)

Metin Oktay (2 February 1936 – 13 September 1991) nicknamed the Crownless King (Turkish: Taçsız Kral) by Galatasaray fans, was a Turkish footballer and one of the most successful goal scorers in Turkey.

== Early life ==
Metin Oktay was born in Karşıyaka, İzmir, on 2 February 1936. His father was an Albanian factory worker and his mother a Turkish homemaker.

== Personal life ==
Metin Oktay married Servet Kardicali on 12 May 1965, in Istanbul. On 9 February 1965, the couple had a daughter who was named by Metin Oktay as "Zeynep". She died the same day she was born. In 1979, Metin and Servet Oktay had a granddaughter from their son Rifat Halil Pala who was named Zeynep Pala. Metin Oktay lived with his family; his spouse Servet Kardicali Oktay, his son Rifat and granddaughter Zeynep until he died on 13 September 1991 in Istanbul.

== Career ==
Oktay started his career at his local amateur club, Damlacık, in 1952 and moved to another amateur side, Yün Mensucat, in the following season during which he made his first appearance for the junior national team in 1954. He was quickly transferred to İzmirspor at the end of the season and became the top scorer with 17 goals in the İzmir League the following season, the first of many times that he would lead the top scorers in the league. In 1955, Gündüz Kılıç, trainer and former footballer of Galatasaray transferred him. Oktay, then only 19 years old, signed a five-year contract with Galatasaray in exchange for a Chevrolet car. Despite his young age, he was the top scorer in his first season in the Istanbul League, with 19 goals, and his team Galatasaray won the championship. Oktay was top scorer for four seasons in the İstanbul League and then three more in the Turkish League, thus making it seven consecutive years in the competitions he played in.

Oktay made a record-breaking contract with Galatasaray in 1960 and because of this deal he had to divorce his wife Oya Sarı who wanted him to play for his old club İzmirspor. In December that year, he scored four goals (after 1, 9, 61 and 71 minutes) in a 5–0 victory against arch rivals Fenerbahçe which fixed his hero status among Galatasaray supporters. Songs were created for him and he became the first-ever Turkish footballer to play himself in a movie based on his life while actively pursuing his career.

Metin Oktay stayed with Galatasaray until 1969, with the exception of a short period in 1961–1962, when he played for Palermo in Italy. He was the most crowned (six times) top goalscorer in the Turkish League and set a record with 217 goals in total. Tanju Çolak broke his record of most goals in a season in 1988 by a margin of one goal. Nicknamed the Taçsız Kral or "King without a crown", he was a particularly strong goal scorer in Derby matches. During a Derby match against Galatasaray's archrivals Fenerbahçe in 1959, he hit the ball hard enough to open a hole in the opponents' goal net. This unforgettable shot was one of the 18 goals that Oktay scored against Fenerbahçe in his career. The other major Istanbul rivals, Beşiktaş let in 13 of his goals.

Oktay was also assistant coach and head coach of Galatasaray football team in the 1969–70 season and he later coached Bursaspor for a couple of years. Oktay was a board member of the club in 1984 for two years.

He played 36 times for the Turkey national team and scored 19 goals. Breaking almost every record in the history of Turkish football that stood at the time, the "King" retired in 1969. Oktay died on 13 September 1991 in Istanbul (at the age of 55, as a result of a traffic accident at the exit of the Bosphorus Bridge) in a car accident.

== Legacy ==
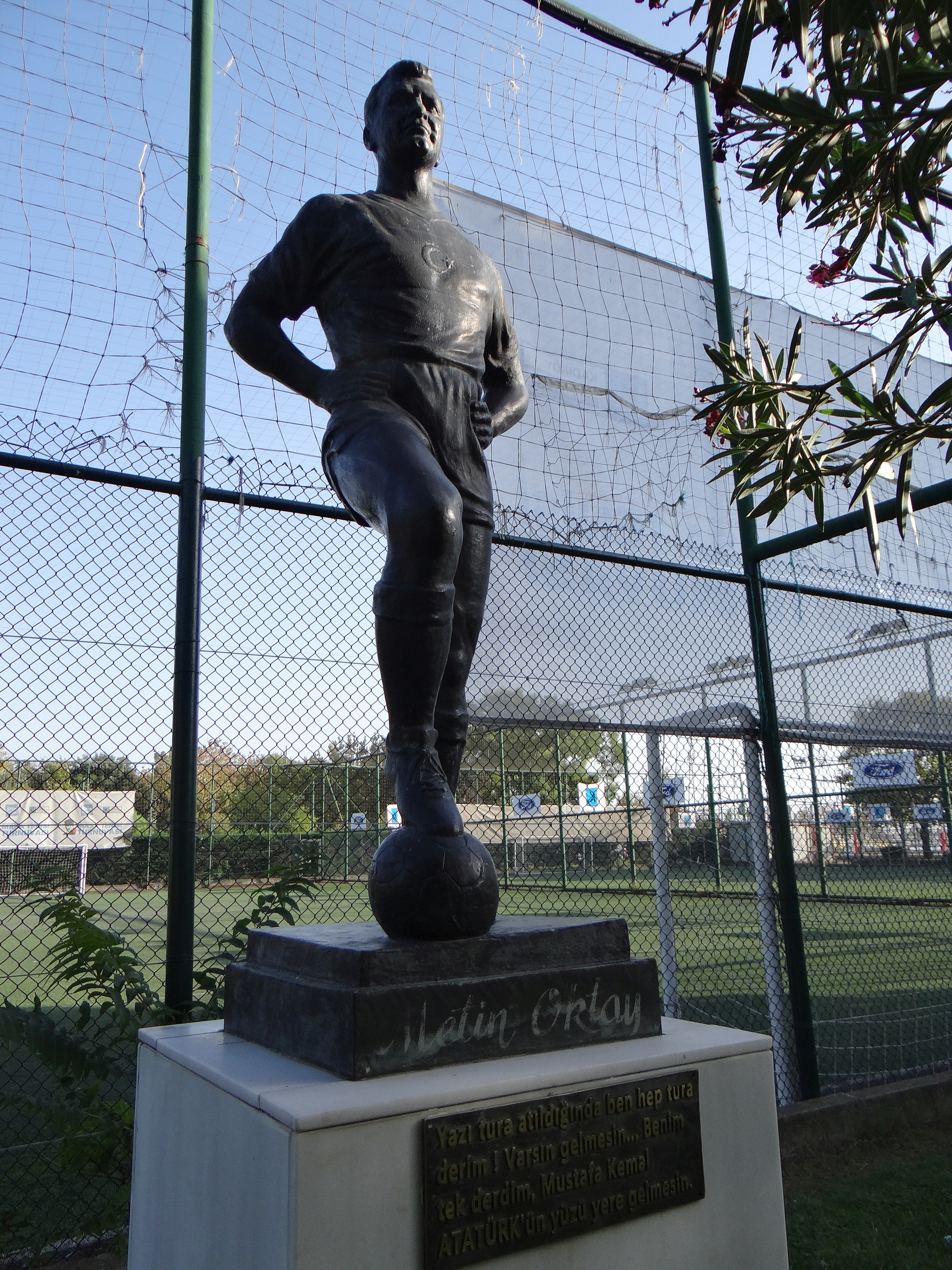
Statue of Metin Oktay

Turkish comics artist Abdullah Turhan once made a comic strip about Metin Okay, published in the magazine 1001 Roman and Fotomaç.

Every year on 13 September, Galatasaray players and supporters pay homage to the "Uncrowned King" at his grave in Kozlu cemetery near Topkapı in Istanbul.

Galatasaray's sports complex and training facility, the Metin Oktay Sports Complex and Training Center, located in Florya, Istanbul, is named after him.

== Career statistics ==
=== International goals ===
#	Date	Venue	Opponent	Score	Result	Competition
1.	18 December 1955	Istanbul, Turkey	Portugal	2–1	3–1	Friendly
2.	25 December 1955	Paris, France	France	1–1	1–3	Mediterranean Cup
3.	19 February 1956	Istanbul, Turkey	Hungary	3–0	3–1	Friendly
4.	16 November 1956	Istanbul, Turkey	Poland	1–1	1–1	Friendly
5.	4 May 1958	Amsterdam, Netherlands	Netherlands	1–1	1–2	Friendly
6.	4 May 1958	Amsterdam, Netherlands	Netherlands	1–2	1–2	Friendly
7.	26 October 1958	Brussels, Belgium	Belgium	1–1	1–1	Friendly
8.	8 June 1960	Ankara, Turkey	Scotland	1–0	4–2	Friendly
9.	27 November 1960	Sofia, Bulgaria	Bulgaria	1–0	1–2	Friendly
10.	1 June 1961	Oslo, Norway	Norway	1–0	1–0	1962 FIFA World Cup qualification
11.	29 October 1961	Istanbul, Turkey	Norway	2–1	2–1	1962 FIFA World Cup qualification
12.	12 November 1961	Istanbul, Turkey	Soviet Union	1–2	1–2	1962 FIFA World Cup qualification
13.	10 October 1962	Ankara, Turkey	Ethiopia	3–0	1–0	Friendly
14.	10 October 1962	Ankara, Turkey	Ethiopia	3–0	2–0	Friendly
15.	10 October 1962	Ankara, Turkey	Ethiopia	3–0	3–0	Friendly
16.	27 September 1964	Istanbul, Turkey	Poland	2–3	2–3	Friendly
17.	1 November 1964	Ankara, Turkey	Tunisia	2–1	4–1	Friendly
18.	1 November 1964	Ankara, Turkey	Tunisia	4–1	4–1	Friendly
19.	9 May 1965	Sofia, Bulgaria	Bulgaria	1–2	1–4	Friendly
Correct as of 10 February 2010

=== Club level ===
A goals tally in bold indicates that Oktay was the competition's top scorer for that season.

Club	Season	League		Cup		Minor Cup		Europe		Total	
Club	Season	Apps	Goals	Apps	Goals	Apps	Goals	Apps	Goals	Apps	Goals
Izmirspor	1954–55	18	**17**	-	-	-	-	-	-	18	17
Izmirspor	Total	18	17	0	0	0	0	0	0	18	17
Galatasaray	1955–56	17	**19**	-	-	-	-	-	-	17	19
Galatasaray	1956–57	27	**24**	-	-	-	-	2	2	29	26
Galatasaray	1957–58	26	**29**	-	-	-	-	-	-	26	29
Galatasaray	1958–59	16	**22**	-	-	-	-	-	-	16	22
Galatasaray	1959	15	**11**	-	-	-	-	-	-	15	11
Galatasaray	1959–60	33	**33**	-	-	-	-	-	-	33	33
Galatasaray	1960–61	30	**36**	-	-	-	-	-	-	30	36
Galatasaray	Total	164	174	0	0	0	0	2	2	166	176
Palermo	1961–62	12	3	-	-	-	-	-	-	12	3
Palermo	Total	12	3	0	0	0	0	0	0	12	3
Galatasaray	1962–63	26	**38**	7	4	0	0	6	5	39	47
Galatasaray	1963–64	32	18	6	7	2	3	5	6	45	34
Galatasaray	1964–65	22	**17**	6	3	0	0	6	3	34	23
Galatasaray	1965–66	26	19	5	1	1	0	1	0	33	20
Galatasaray	1966–67	17	10	1	0	0	0	-	-	18	10
Galatasaray	1967–68	27	18	6	3	2	0	-	-	35	21
Galatasaray	1968–69	30	**17**	8	4	1	0	-	-	39	21
Galatasaray	Total	180	137	39	22	6	3	18	14	243	176
Career total		374	331	39	22	6	3	20	16	437	372

== Honours ==
=== Club ===
Galatasaray

- Süper Lig: 1962–63, 1968–69
- Turkish Cup: 1962–63, 1963–64, 1964–65, 1965–66
- Turkish Super Cup: 1966, 1969
- Istanbul Football League: 1955–56, 1957–58
- TSYD Cup: 1963, 1966, 1967

=== Individual ===
- Izmir Football League Top Scorer: 1954–55
- Istanbul Football League Top Scorer: 1955–56, 1956–57, 1957–58, 1958–59
- Gol Kralı (6): 1959, 1959–60, 1960–61, 1962–63, 1964–65, 1968–69 (record)
  (In 1968–69, both Metin Oktay and Fevzi Zemzem had 19 goals each. Zemzem asked for Oktay to have the trophy)
- Most Süper Lig goals in a single season: 38 (1962–63)
- Galatasaray All-Time Top Scorer: 352

== See also ==
- List of Galatasaray S.K. records and statistics

Sporting positions
Preceded by Turgay Şeren	Galatasaray S.K. Captain; 1967–1969	Succeeded by Talat Özkarslı
