= Vangelis (given name) =

Vangelis (Greek: Βαγγέλης) is a Greek masculine given name. Notable people with the name include:

- Vangelis Alexandris, basketball coach and retired player
- Vangelis Georgiou (born 1988), Greek football left winger/back
- Vangelis Kazan (1930s–2008), Greek character actor
- Vangelis Meimarakis (born 1953), Greek lawyer and politician
- Vangelis Moras (born 1981), Greek football centre back
- Vangelis Mourikis, actor
- Vangelis Petrakis (1938–2026), Greek footballer
- Vangelis Ploios (1937–2020), Greek theatrical, film and television actor
- Vangelis Sklavos (born 1977), Greek basketball player
- Vangelis Vlachos (born 1962), Greek football midfielder

== Fictional characters ==
- Vangelis (Ninjago), character from Ninjago

== See also ==
- Evangelos (Ευάγγελος), a common Greek name and root for Vangelis
