= Evangelos =

- Pronunciation: Greek: [eˈvaɲɟelos]
- Gender: Male
- Language: Greek

Origin
- Meaning: "messenger who brings good news"
- Region of origin: Greece

Other names
- Nickname: Vangelis
- Related names: Evangelina

Evangelos, Vangelis (Greek: Ευάγγελος, Βαγγέλης or, in polytonic orthography, Εὐάγγελος; from εὐ- "good" + ἄγγελος "messenger, angel") is a common Greek male name. The diminutive derived from the name Evangelos, is usually Vangelis. The female equivalent is Evangelía (Ευαγγελία).

It is an ancient Greek name; in Greek mythology there are at least two personalities bearing the name. One was Pixodarus, a shepherd who discovered the marble from which the Temple of Artemis in Ephesus was built (one of the Seven Wonders of the Ancient World), and was thereafter worshiped as a god named Evangelos, because he brought the good news. The second was the successor of the prophet Branchus to the shrine of Miletus, called Evangelos because he was the one announcing the good oracles; he was at the origin of a clan of prophets, the Evangelides.

According to the Dictionary of Greek and Roman Biography and Mythology (Harper, New York, 1884), Evangelus (Ευάγγελος) was: 1. A Greek comic poet of the new comedy, a fragment of one of whose plays ie preserved by Athenaeus; edited by Meineke, Fragm. Comic. Graec., vol. ii., p. 1173, edit. minor. 2. A slave of Pericles, who distinguished himself by his abilities; he is said to have written a work on the science of war "Tactics" (Τακτικά), which was highly prized by Philopoemen.

Later, with the advent of Christianity, the name was connected to the "good word" of the Gospels (in Greek, Εὐαγγέλιον, evangélion, Evangile), and to the people bearing the good news (evangelists), as well as to the Annunciation itself (in Greek Εὐαγγελισμός), meaning the bringing of the good news to Virgin Mary by Archangel Gabriel, that she was going to conceive Jesus.

== Name day ==
Bearers of the name Evangelos celebrate their name day on March 25, as the Annunciation, is celebrated in churches on that day.

== Famous Greek people bearing the name ==
- Evangelos Averoff-Tositsas (Ευάγγελος Αβέρωφ Τοσίτσας; 1910–1990), conservative Greek politician, writer and industrialist
- Evangelos Damaskos (Ευάγγελος Δαμάσκος), Greek light athlete active in the nineteenth century
- Evangelos Mantzios (Ευάγγελος Μάντζιος; b. 1983), Greek footballer
- Evangelos "Vangelis" Moras (Βαγγέλης Μόρας; b. 1981), Greek footballer
- Evangelos Nessos (b. 1978), former German footballer of Greek ancestry
- Evangelos Venizelos (Ευάγγελος Βενιζέλος; b. 1957), Greek jurist and politician (former leader of the centre-left party PASOK)
- Evangelos Zappas (Ευάγγελος Ζάππας; 1800–1865), Greek merchant
- Evangelos Odysseas "Vangelis" Papathanassiou (Ευάγγελος Οδυσσέας Παπαθανασίου; 1943–2022), composer of electronic, progressive, ambient, jazz, pop rock, and orchestral music.
- Vangelis Katsanis (Ευάγγελος Κατσάνης; (died 2009), playwright, famous for "The Successors," an extremely anti-royalist play which resulted in Katsanis' exile
- Evangelis Pavlidis (b. 1998) professional football player

== Variants ==
- Vangélis, Vángos (Βαγγέλης, Βάγγος), the most common diminutives of this name
- Evangelía, Vangelió, Vangelítsa (Ευαγγελία, Βαγγελιώ, Βαγγελίτσα), the female variant

== See also ==
- Evangelos Florakis Naval Base
