= Nuri Asan =

Turkish footballer (1940–1989)

Personal information
- Date of birth: 1 January 1940
- Place of birth: Turkey
- Date of death: 20 January 1989 (aged 49)
- Place of death: Turkey

Senior career*
Years	Team	Apps	(Gls)
1958–1964	Galatasaray		
1964–1968	Ankaragücü		
1968–1973	Samsunspor		

Managerial career
- 1973: Samsunspor
- 1977–1979: Samsunspor
- 1982–1983: Samsunspor
- 1988–1989: Samsunspor
- * Club domestic league appearances and goals

Nuri Asan (1 January 1940 - 20 January 1989) was a Turkish football player and manager.

== Club career ==
Asan was regarded as one of the most important players in the history of Turkish side Samsunspor, and honored in a statue.

== International career ==
Asan represented Turkey internationally at youth level.

== Style of play ==
Asan was known for his technical ability.

== Personal life ==
Asan was the son of former Gaziler district headman Muhtar Mahmut Asan.
