= Suat Mamat =

Turkish footballer (1930–2016)

Personal information
- Full name: Suat İsmail Mamat
- Date of birth: 8 November 1930
- Place of birth: Bakırköy, Istanbul, Turkey
- Date of death: 3 February 2016 (aged 85)
- Place of death: Istanbul, Turkey
- Position: Forward

Senior career*
Years	Team	Apps	(Gls)
1949–1952	Ankara Demirspor		
1952–1964	Galatasaray S.K.	278	(95)
1964–1968	Beşiktaş J.K.	87	(8)
1968–1969	Vefa S.K.	9	(1)

International career
1954–1963	Turkey	27	(4)

Managerial career
- 1975–1976: Çaykur Rizespor
- 1977–1978: MKE Kırıkkalespor
- 1979–1980: Mersin İdmanyurdu
- * Club domestic league appearances and goals

Suat İsmail Mamat (8 November 1930 – 3 February 2016) was a Turkish professional footballer who played in Turkey for Ankara Demirspor, Galatasaray S.K., Beşiktaş J.K. and Vefa S.K.

== International career ==
Mamat made 27 appearances for the full Turkey national football team, including appearing in two matches at the 1954 FIFA World Cup finals, where he scored three goals, including Turkey's first World Cup goal on 17 June 1954 against West Germany.

He died on 3 February 2016, only two days after the death of his teammate Ali Beratlıgil.
