= Uğur Köken =

Turkish footballer

Personal information
- Date of birth: 28 November 1937 (age 88)
- Place of birth: Istanbul, Turkey
- Position: Wide midfielder

Youth career
- 1950–1955: Galatasaray SK

Senior career*
Years	Team	Apps	(Gls)
1955–1973	Galatasaray SK	296	(35)

International career
1962–1966	Turkey	12	(0)
- * Club domestic league appearances and goals

Uğur Köken (born November 28, 1937) is the former left wide midfielder of Galatasaray. He played at Galatasaray between 1955 and 1973 and was capped 12 times for Turkey, He competed in the men's tournament at the 1960 Summer Olympics.

== Honours ==
=== As player ===
- Galatasaray
  - Süper Lig: 6
    - 1961-1962, 1962–1963, 1968–1969, 1970–1971, 1971–1972, 1972–1973
  - Turkish Cup: 5
    - 1962-1963, 1963–1964, 1964–1965, 1965–1966, 1972–1973
  - Süper Kupa: 3
    - 1966, 1969, 1972
  - TSYD Kupası: 4
    - 1963, 1966, 1967, 1970

== See also ==
- List of one-club men
- List of Turkish football champions
- Football records in Turkey

Sporting positions
Preceded by Talat Özkarslı	Galatasaray S.K. Captain; 1971-1973	Succeeded by Metin Muzaffer Sipahi
