= Mustafa Yürür =

Turkish footballer

Personal information
- Date of birth: 26 June 1938 (age 88)

International career
Years	Team	Apps	(Gls)
1960–1968	Turkey	18	(0)

Mustafa Yürür (born 26 June 1938) is a Turkish footballer. He played in 18 matches for the Turkey national football team from 1960 to 1968.
