= Ayhan Elmastaşoğlu =

Turkish footballer

Personal information
- Full name: Ayhan Elmastaşoğlu
- Date of birth: August 23, 1941 (age 85)
- Place of birth: İzmir, Turkey
- Height: 1.74 m (5 ft 9 in)
- Position: Midfielder

Senior career*
Years	Team	Apps	(Gls)
1961-1976	Altay	46	(16)
1960-1972	Galatasaray	222	(70)
1972-1974	Sakaryaspor	21	(0)

International career
1959	Turkey U18	4	(2)
1963–1964	Turkey U21	3	(4)
1965–1969	Turkey	19	(4)
- * Club domestic league appearances and goals

Ayhan Elmastaşoğlu (born 23 August 1941) is a retired Turkish professional footballer. Elmastaşoğlu is best known for his 12 year stint with Galatasaray from 1960-1972. He helped Galatasaray win 5 Süper Ligs, 4 Turkish Cups, and 2 Turkish Super Cups.

== International career ==
Elmastaşoğlu was a youth international for Turkey, and represented the senior Turkey team 19 times. He debuted for Turkey in a 1966 FIFA World Cup qualification 1-0 loss to Portugal on 19 April 1964.

== Personal life ==
Elmastaşoğlu's brothers, Ayfer and Nail, were also professional footballers.

== Honours ==
Galatasaray

- Süper Lig: 1961-62, 1962-63, 1968-1969, 1970-1971, 1971-1972
- Turkish Cup: 1962-63, 1963-64, 1964-65, 1965-66
- Turkish Super Cup: 1966, 1969

Turkey

- ECO Cup: 1967
