= Beşiktaş–Fenerbahçe rivalry (football) =

Beşiktaş v Fenerbahçe
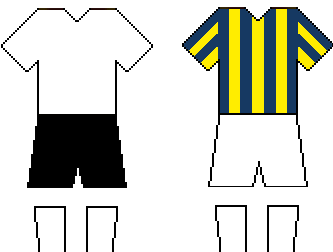
- Sport: Football
- Location: Istanbul, Turkey
- Teams: Beşiktaş; Fenerbahçe
- First meeting: Fenerbahçe 4–0 Beşiktaş; 22 November 1924; 101 years ago Fenerbahçe 3–0 Beşiktaş; 22 April 1921; 105 years ago (win by forfeit, not recognized by some sources)
- Latest meeting: Fenerbahçe 1–2 Beşiktaş; Süper Lig (5 September 2026)
- Stadiums: Beşiktaş Stadium (Beşiktaş); Şükrü Saracoğlu Stadium (Fenerbahçe)

Statistics
- Total meetings: 365 (Note: Some sources claim that the 1921 Galatasaray Cup match count as the first meeting of the rivals and believe that a +1 should be added to the total match count.)
- Most wins: Fenerbahçe (137)
- Most player appearances: Rıza Çalımbay (62)
- All-time series: Beşiktaş: 131; Drawn: 97; Fenerbahçe: 137
- Largest victory: Fenerbahçe 7–0 Beşiktaş (6 December 1958)

The Beşiktaş–Fenerbahçe rivalry is a Turkish football rivalry involving two of the most successful clubs in the Süper Lig. It is also a local derby, one of many involving Istanbul clubs. The fixture is almost a century in existence and has developed into an intense and often bitter one, traditionally attracting large attendances. As of 2025, Fenerbahçe has not defeated its rivals by a margin of 4 or more goals for 50 years while Beşiktaş has not defeated its rivals by a margin of 4 or more goals for 35 years.

In addition to football, the two clubs also compete in basketball, volleyball, athletics, boxing, table tennis and rowing. In the past, the two clubs have faced each other in wrestling, field hockey, weightlifting, swimming and cycling.

== History ==
=== 1921 Galatasaray Cup ===
Fenerbahçe and Beşiktaş football teams were supposed to face each other for the first time in history on 22 April 1921, but Beşiktaş withdrew from the tournament organised by Galatasaray when they could not play İttihatspor's Bekir and Galatasaray's Refik Osman due to Galatasaray's objection. Fenerbahçe was deemed the winner, and the match was registered as a 3–0 win by forfeit.

Spor Âlemi, an Ottoman sports magazine at the time reports the match as follows: Beşiktaş did not participate in the game between Fenerbahçe and Beşiktaş clubs. It did not obey the orders given by the match organisers because it brought outsiders to the team. Fenerbahçe was declared the winner.

1921 Galatasaray Cup
22 April 1921

Fenerbahçe	3–0	Beşiktaş
	Report

İttihat Çayırı

=== First meeting ===
The two teams met for the first time in a friendly match played at Taksim Stadium on 28 November 1924. Fenerbahçe won the first match with a score of 4–0, with Cafer Çağatay scoring the first goal in the history of derby. Beşiktaş, on the other hand, got its first win on 13 November 1927 with a score of 1–0. The first draw (0-0) was obtained on 12 November 1926 in the Istanbul Football League.

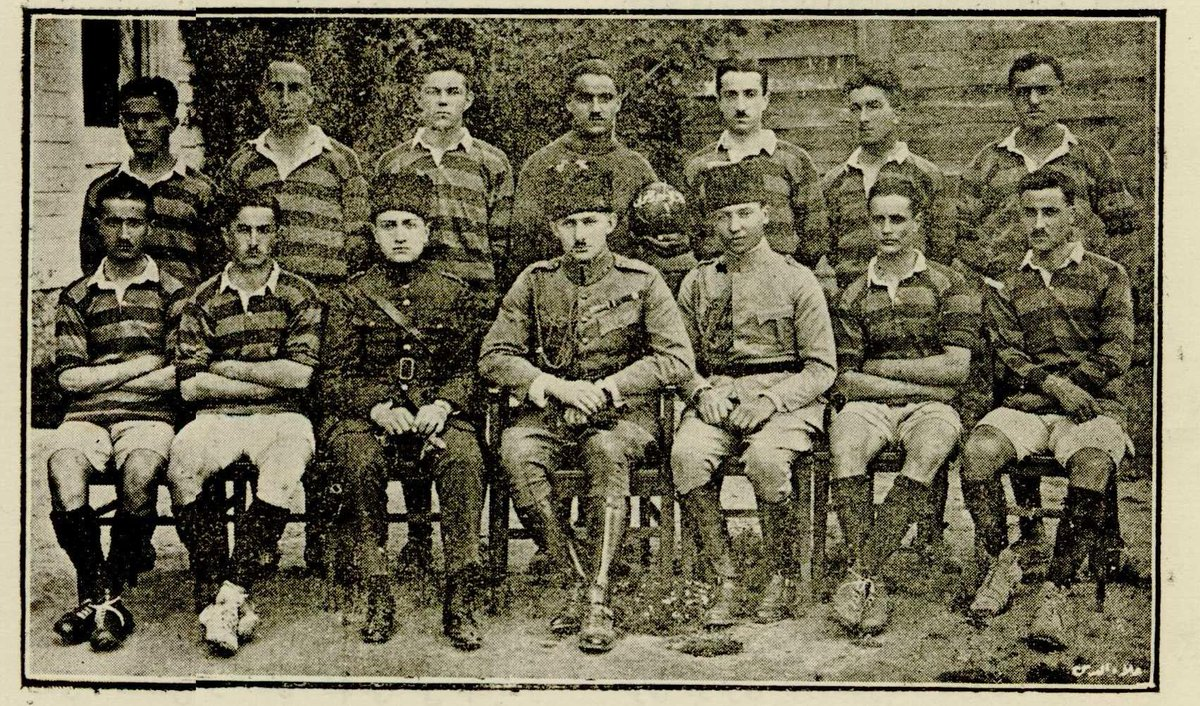
Fenerbahçe's squad in the 1921-1922 season

As of 6 December 2023, Fenerbahçe and Beşiktaş have faced each other 134 times in league matches organised since 1959. In the remaining matches in the league, Fenerbahçe won 47 times and Beşiktaş won 42 times. In 45 matches, the teams could not get the upper hand over each other. The two teams scored 157 goals in the matches played in the league. Beşiktaş and Fenerbahçe played their first professional league match on 18 March 1959, with Fenerbahçe winning the match played at İnönü Stadium 1–0.

The record for the most goals scored in the rivalry is kept by the 11 August 1974 TSYD Cup match, in which Beşiktaş won the match held at İnönü Stadium with a score of 5–4.

Beşiktaş's legendary captain Hakkı Yeten scored the most goals in the rivalry.

11 of the 358 matches were the jubilee matches. In these 11 matches, footballers such as Lefter Küçükandonyadis, Can Bartu, Selim Soydan, Nedim Doğan, Cemil Turan, Mehmet Oğuz, Fehmi Sağınoğlu, Sanlı Sarıalioğlu, Fahrettin Cansever, Samet Aybaba and Metin Tekin announced their retirement from football. Of these 11 jubilee matches, Fenerbahçe won 6, Beşiktaş won 2 and 3 matches ended in a draw.

=== What would have been the second meeting: the match that was never played ===
Beşiktaş v Fenerbahçe was an Istanbul Football League match that was supposed to take place on 25 December 1925, it got pospotoned to an unspecified date following Fenerbahçe authorities objections against the match being played on the pitch of İttihatspor club. If this match hadn't been postponed, it would have been the second meeting between the two teams in their history. It is not known whether the match got cancelled or not due to lack of information on the match.

Istanbul Football League
25 December 1925
(postponed, never been played)

Beşiktaş	v	Fenerbahçe
	Report

=== "Did the ball cross the line or not?" debate ===
The match between the rivals on 16 November 1991 sparked a debate that lasted for many years.

In the 87th minute of the 1991–92 1.Lig match between the rivals hosted at Şükrü Saraçoğlu Stadium, Beşiktaş's Mehmet Özdilek scored the equalising goal making the score 2-2, which caused a long-lasting public debate as to whether the ball had crossed the goal line.

The prolonged appeals of Fenerbahçe players and the technical team did not change the result. Seventeen years after the match was played, the position was discussed in the Lig TV's programme Futbol Gündemi, according to the measurements of the device called "piero", it was determined that the ball crossed the line by 4 centimetres, putting an end to the discussions.

Yuvakuran, who tried to clear the ball away from the goal line later stated that: "Actually it was a goal, I couldn't say it because there was so much pressure at the time".

1991–92 1.Lig
16 November 1991
13:00 (UTC+03:00)
10th gameweek

Fenerbahçe	2–2	Beşiktaş
Kocaman 30'; Kocaman 48'	Report	Özdilek 1'; Özdilek 88'

Şükrü Saraçoğlu Stadium
Attendance: 23.885
Referee: Ahmet Çakar
Assistants: Çetin Oytuner
İsmet Cengiz

=== 6+5 rule scandal ===
Beşiktaş 3-0 Fenerbahçe was a Turkish First Football League or now known as Süper Lig match in which Fenerbahçe manager Mustafa Denizli made a historic mistake and had 6 foreign players on the field at the same time, violating the football regulations implemented in Turkey.

The match's result was registered as a 3–0 win by forfeit for Beşiktaş with the decision of the Turkish Football Federation.

2000–01 1.Lig
16 September 2000
19:00 (UTC+03:00)

Beşiktaş	3–0	Fenerbahçe
Kahveci 17'; Havutcu 49'; Nouma 67'	Report

BJK İnönü Stadium
Referee: Metin Tokat

=== Pancu: the Kadıköy panther ===
On the 28th gameweek of the 2004–05 Süper Lig season, during a derby match against Fenerbahçe, with the score at 2–3, Pancu replaced Óscar Córdoba, after the goalkeeper received a red card and Beşiktaş had already used all their substitutes. After conceding a penalty, Pancu kept Fenerbahçe at bay until Koray scored the fourth goal for Beşiktaş in the fifth minute of added time. Beşiktaş thus sealed a sensational away win over their rivals at Kadiköy Stadium. Pancu was given the nickname "Kadıköy Panteri" (the panther of Kadıköy) and dressed in a regular goalkeeper's jersey with the number "1" the following season. He later stated that he felt uncomfortable being labelled as a goalkeeper, as his native playing position was a forward.

=== The Bilica incident ===
In a 2009-2010 Süper Lig match between the two teams on 18 April 2010, in which Fenerbahçe defeated Beşiktaş 1–0 in Kadıköy, Fenerbahçe footballer Fábio Alves Da Silva, or commonly known as "Bilica", loosened the grass of the penalty spot with his boot before the penalty kick won by the black-white team in the 64th minute had been taken, this resulted in Bobo's penalty shot getting saved by goalkeeper Volkan Demirel, denying his opponent the chance of a draw. Although Beşiktaş requested TFF to replay the match, this offer was rejected.

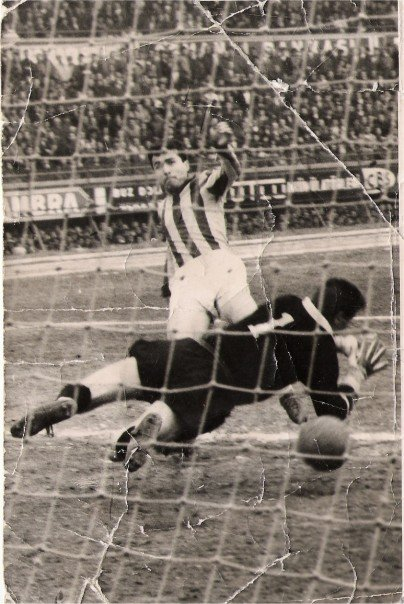
Fenerbahçe player Yüksel Gündüz, scoring against Beşiktaş

Levent Erdoğan, former Beşiktaş vice-president, made the following statements about the incident: ''Turkish football is buried in the grave Bilica dug at the penalty spot at Şükrü Saraçoğlu Stadium.''

=== Turkish Cup semi-finals second leg events ===
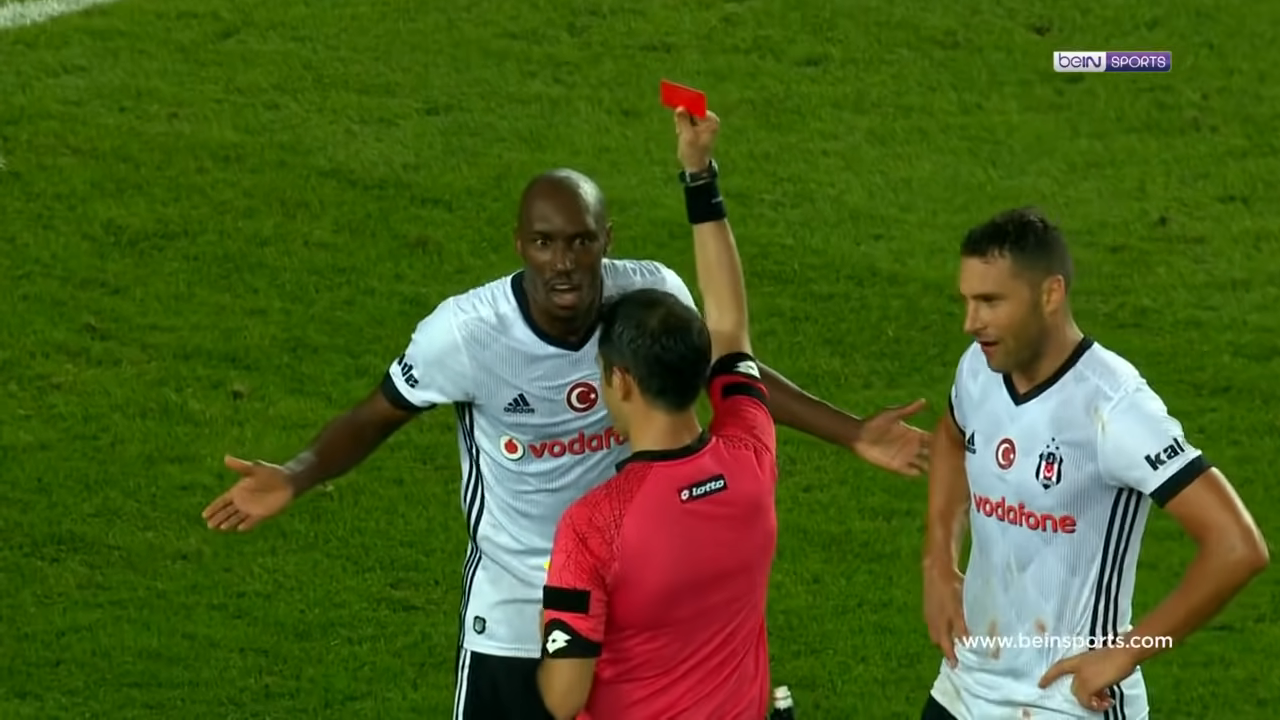
Former captain of Beşiktaş, Atiba Hutchinson receiving a red card in a Fenerbahçe-Beşiktaş match on 23 September 2017

In the Ziraat Turkey Cup semi-final second leg between the two rivals on 19 April 2018, Fenerbahçe fans injured Beşiktaş manager Şenol Güneş by throwing a projectile at him from the stands in the 57th minute.

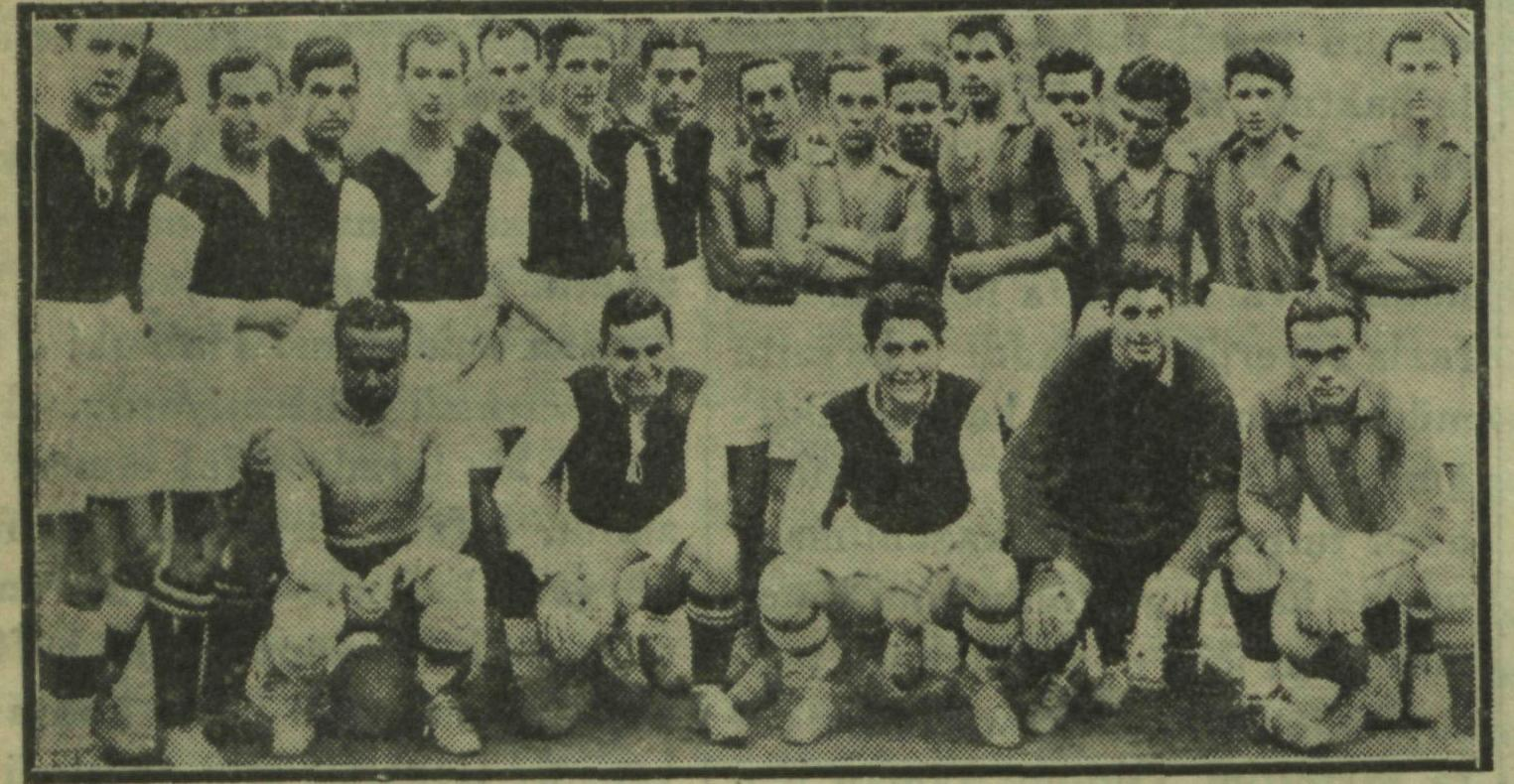
Fenerbahçe and Beşiktaş teams together

Güneş collapsed on the ground and had to receive several stitches in his head. After the incidents, referee Mete Kalkavan decided to suspend the match and urged both teams' players to go to their dressing rooms, this however only grew the severity of arguments between the two team's players, with a fight breaking out between the rivals in the corridors, police teams entered the corridors to intervene. Beşiktaş's gaming operation Erdinç Gültekin was also injured in the corridor fight. 31 people were detained over the occurrences.

Fenerbahçe were on track to reach the final, having previously drawn 2–2 in the first leg, with former Real Madrid defender Pepe sent off for Beşiktaş in the first half of the second leg with the score 0-0.

On 3 May 2018, the Turkish Football Federation announced that the match would be continued from the 57th minute. In response to the events, Beşiktaş refused to play in cup, stating that it would boycott the match in protest of the ruling. The Turkish Football Federation later awarded Fenerbahçe a 3–0 win by forfeit over Beşiktaş, also disqualifying Beşiktaş from the tournament and banning them from participating in the 2018–19 season of the Turkish Cup.

=== Fan's rivalry ===
Beşiktaş and Fenerbahçe are among the most popular Turkish clubs; both sides have large fanbases that follow them in domestic and international matches. Football hooliganism is a very common phenomenon between their fans in recent years, featuring anything from breaking seats, cursing, fighting, fireworks and street rioting.

== Culture ==
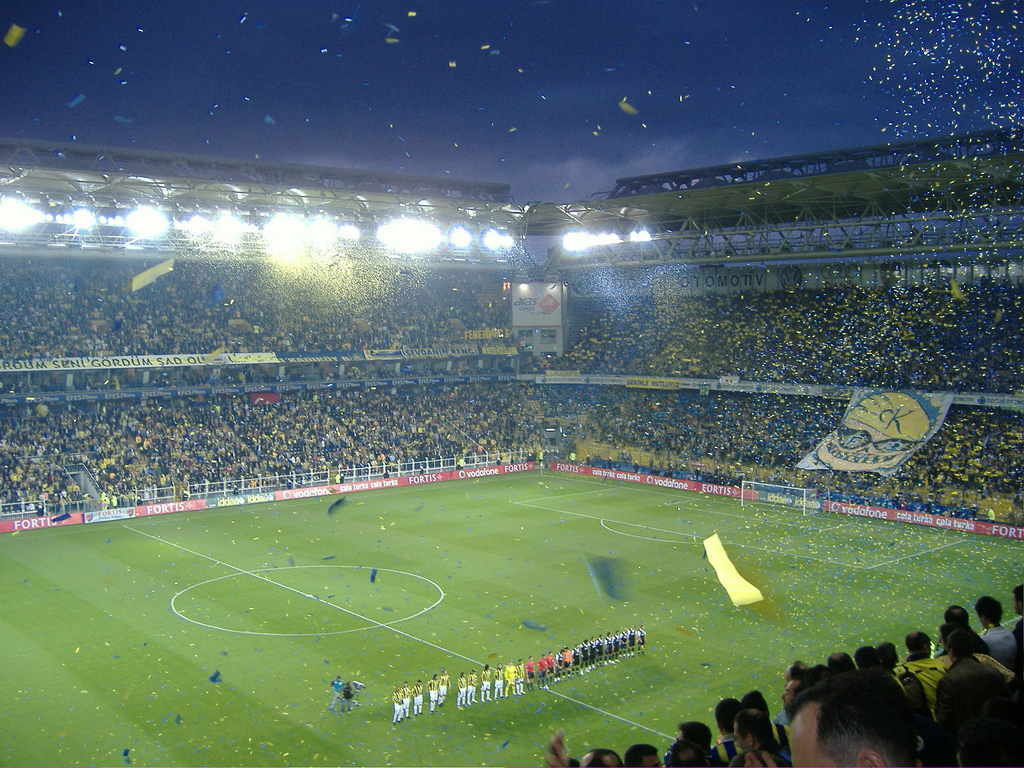
A view from the Fenerbahçe-Beşiktaş Turkish Cup semi-finals second leg match on 26 April 2007

The clubs originate from two different sides of the Bosphorus. Beşiktaş J.K. was founded in the district and municipality of Beşiktaş, located on the European side of Istanbul. Fenerbahçe S.K. was founded in the district of Kadıköy, located in the Asian side of Istanbul. Both clubs naturally draw the majority of their support from the side of the city that they are native to, but maintain a significant majority of support drawn from the remainder of Turkey.

== Honours ==
As of 3 August 2024

Fenerbahçe	Competition	Beşiktaş
Domestic
19	Süper Lig	16
7	Turkish Cup	11
10	Turkish Super Cup	10
36	Total	37
6	Turkish National Division (defunct)	3
3	Turkish Football Championship (defunct)	2
8	Prime Minister's Cup (defunct)	6
1	Atatürk Cup (defunct)	1
1	Spor Toto Cup (defunct)	3
16	Istanbul Football League (defunct)	13
1	Istanbul Cup (defunct)	2
36	Defunct total	30
72	Total	67

== Supporters ==
A poll involving 1.4 million people asked for the team they support in Turkey, organized by online gambling website Bilyoner, the poll showed that Galatasaray made up the most fans with 35%, Fenerbahçe came second with 34% and Beşiktaş with came third with 19%.

== Istanbul Football League matches ==
Season	Date	Stadium	Home team	Score	Away team	Fenerbahçe scorers	Beşiktaş scorers
1926/27	12-11-1926	Taksim	Fenerbahçe	0–0	Beşiktaş		
1928/29	26-10-1928	Taksim	Beşiktaş	4–2	Fenerbahçe	Arıcan (10), Sporel (62)	Erkuş (21, 75), Bilgiç (34), Maratoncu (43)
1928/29	24-05-1929	Taksim	Fenerbahçe	3–1	Beşiktaş	Sporel (9, 21, 82)	Bilgiç (34)
1929/30	17-01-1930	Taksim	Fenerbahçe	5–0	Beşiktaş	Arıcan (31, 44), Sporel (40), Çizer (73), Baydar (86)	
1929/30	23-05-1930	Taksim	Beşiktaş	3–3	Fenerbahçe	Sel (20, 42), Sporel (80)	Erkuş (34), Onar (48), Ozgan (70)
1930/31	09-01-1931	Taksim	Fenerbahçe	1–0	Beşiktaş	Arıcan (82)	
1930/31	29-05-1931	Taksim	Beşiktaş	1–0	Fenerbahçe		Erkuş (14)
1931/32	06-11-1931	Taksim	Fenerbahçe	0–3	Beşiktaş		awarded 0–3
1931/32	30-04-1932	Taksim	Beşiktaş	3–0	Fenerbahçe		awarded 3–0
1932/33	23-12-1932	Taksim	Fenerbahçe	2–1	Beşiktaş	Topkanlı (23), Çizer (66)	Yeten (22)
1932/33	16-06-1933	Saraçoğlu	Beşiktaş	0–0	Fenerbahçe		
1933/34	12-01-1934	Taksim	Beşiktaş	3–2	Fenerbahçe	Arıcan (12), Sel (42)	Yeten (56, 88), Görkey (67)
1933/34	13-04-1934	Saraçoğlu	Fenerbahçe	0–1	Beşiktaş		Yeten (48)
1934/35	14-12-1934	Şeref	Beşiktaş	0–1	Fenerbahçe	Erbay (25)	
1934/35	11-01-1935	Saraçoğlu	Fenerbahçe	4–2	Beşiktaş	Sel (12), Erbay (25, 68), Arıcan (26)	Yeten (41 (pen.),47 (pen.))
1935/36	02-02-1936	Saraçoğlu	Fenerbahçe	1–0	Beşiktaş	Alpaslan (62 (pen.))	
1935/36	02-02-1936	Taksim	Beşiktaş	0–3	Fenerbahçe	awarded 0–3	
1936/37	22-11-1936	Şeref	Fenerbahçe	2–0	Beşiktaş	Kaner (49), Tansu (51)	
1937/38	07-11-1937	Taksim	Beşiktaş	1–1	Fenerbahçe	Arıcan (36)	Erberk (70)
1938/39	02-10-1938	Saraçoğlu	Fenerbahçe	2–2	Beşiktaş	Yalçınpınar (54), Arıcan (62)	Onar (7), Yeten (20)
1938/39	04-12-1938	Şeref	Beşiktaş	1–0	Fenerbahçe		Ozgan (81)
1939/40	15-10-1939	Şeref	Beşiktaş	4–3	Fenerbahçe	Kaner (22), Yalçınpınar (30), Arıcan (73)	Yeten (41 (pen.), 68), Tusder (49), Gençsoy (78)
1939/40	24-03-1940	Saraçoğlu	Fenerbahçe	5–1	Beşiktaş	Bastoncu (15, 25, 65), Taşkavak (22), Kotanca (70)	Savman (34 (pen.))
1940/41	20-09-1940	Şeref	Beşiktaş	2–1	Fenerbahçe	Bastoncu (54)	Yeten (27), Ün (85)
1940/41	16-02-1941	Şeref	Fenerbahçe	0–1	Beşiktaş		Gençsoy (21)
1941/42	23-11-1941	Saraçoğlu	Fenerbahçe	3–0	Beşiktaş	awarded 3–0	
1941/42	01-03-1942	Şeref	Beşiktaş	1–0	Fenerbahçe		Görkey (9)
1942/43	22-11-1942	Saraçoğlu	Beşiktaş	2–1	Fenerbahçe	Erkal (7)	Görkey (15), Sarper (29)
1942/43	28-02-1943	Şeref	Fenerbahçe	0–1	Beşiktaş		Görkey (90)
1943/44	24-10-1943	Saraçoğlu	Beşiktaş	1–0	Fenerbahçe		Gençsoy (39)
1943/44	20-02-1944	Şeref	Fenerbahçe	0–0	Beşiktaş		
1944/45	22-10-1944	Saraçoğlu	Fenerbahçe	0–1	Beşiktaş		Görkey (77)
1944/45	14-01-1945	Şeref	Beşiktaş	2–0	Fenerbahçe		Gülçelik (58, 85)
1945/46	07-10-1945	Şeref	Fenerbahçe	1–2	Beşiktaş	Keskin (71)	Gülçelik (23, 40)
1945/46	16-12-1945	Saraçoğlu	Beşiktaş	1–1	Fenerbahçe	Erol (87)	Çapa (42)
1946/47	29-09-1946	Şeref	Fenerbahçe	4–3	Beşiktaş	Has (23, 32), Kotanca (30), Alyüz (90 (pen.))	Seba (47), Gülçelik (58), Gülesin (86 (pen.))
1946/47	15-12-1946	Saraçoğlu	Beşiktaş	1–2	Fenerbahçe	Keskin (60), Bastoncu (75)	Süreyya (29)
1947/48	18-01-1948	Saraçoğlu	Fenerbahçe	2–0	Beşiktaş	Erol (19), Deringör (40)	
1947/48	04-04-1948	Şeref	Beşiktaş	2–3	Fenerbahçe	Erol (22), Yetkiner (28), Küçükandonyadis (70)	Alyüz (1 (o.g.)), Gülesin (54)
1948/49	10-10-1948	İnönü	Beşiktaş	3–1	Fenerbahçe	Kırcan (27)	Yorulmaz (51), Gülesin (52, 84)
1948/49	16-01-1949	İnönü	Fenerbahçe	0–1	Beşiktaş		Gülesin (83)
1949/50	27-11-1949	İnönü	Fenerbahçe	1–1	Beşiktaş	Uzkes (43)	Cansever (48)
1949/50	05-03-1950	İnönü	Beşiktaş	1–0	Fenerbahçe		Saygun (50)
1950/51	11-02-1951	İnönü	Fenerbahçe	0–1	Beşiktaş		Yetiş (75)
1950/51	08-04-1951	İnönü	Fenerbahçe	1–3	Beşiktaş	Kırcan (15)	Adanır (42, 51), Yorulmaz (75)
1951/52	10-02-1952	Mithatpaşa	Beşiktaş	1–0	Fenerbahçe		Yorulmaz (14)
1951/52	01-05-1952	Mithatpaşa	Fenerbahçe	2–4	Beşiktaş	Ülgün (35), Sargun (47)	Taş (27), Yorulmaz (66, 78), Ülük (83)
1952/53	16-11-1952	Mithatpaşa	Fenerbahçe	3–1	Beşiktaş	Kırcan (3), Sargun (40), Matay (57)	Seba (23)
1952/53	08-02-1953	Mithatpaşa	Beşiktaş	0–0	Fenerbahçe		
1953/54	29-11-1953	Mithatpaşa	Beşiktaş	2–0	Fenerbahçe		Adanır (36), Yorulmaz (60)
1953/54	16-08-1954	Mithatpaşa	Fenerbahçe	0–3	Beşiktaş		awarded 0–3
1954/55	05-12-1954	Mithatpaşa	Beşiktaş	1–1	Fenerbahçe	Sargun (48)	Taş (23)
1954/55	10-04-1955	Mithatpaşa	Fenerbahçe	1–1	Beşiktaş	Sargun (24)	Adanır (89)
1955/56	04-12-1955	Mithatpaşa	Beşiktaş	1–1	Fenerbahçe	Poyrazoğlu (86)	Bilge (24)
1955/56	03-06-1956	Mithatpaşa	Fenerbahçe	2–2	Beşiktaş	Has (10), Küçükandonyadis (88)	Esel (57), Ertuğ (81)
1956/57	23-12-1956	Mithatpaşa	Fenerbahçe	2–0	Beşiktaş	Çoruh (65 (pen.)), Bartu (86)	
1956/57	24-03-1957	Mithatpaşa	Beşiktaş	2–4	Fenerbahçe	Küçükandonyadis (8, 74), Bartu (53), Öztuna (61)	Atik (10), Bilge (17)
1957/58	01-09-1957	Mithatpaşa	Fenerbahçe	3–1	Beşiktaş	Has (24), Bayraktutan (60), Öztuna (75)	Bilge (89)
1957/58	29-12-1957	Mithatpaşa	Beşiktaş	1–1	Fenerbahçe	Bayraktutan (28)	Bilge (13)
1958/59	05-10-1958	Mithatpaşa	Fenerbahçe	4–1	Beşiktaş	Bartu (10), Has (28, 79), Güven (83)	Berman (46)
1958/59	25-01-1959	Mithatpaşa	Beşiktaş	0–0	Fenerbahçe		

== Süper Lig matches ==
Season	Date	Stadium	Home team	Score	Away team	Fenerbahçe scorers	Beşiktaş scorers
1959	18-03-1959	İnönü	Fenerbahçe	1–0	Beşiktaş	Kalkavan (84)	
1959	17-05-1959	İnönü	Beşiktaş	0–2	Fenerbahçe	Has (28), Kırklar (44)	
1959/60	03-01-1960	İnönü	Beşiktaş	1–0	Fenerbahçe		Özataç (14)
1959/60	12-06-1960	Ankara 19 Mayıs	Fenerbahçe	1–0	Beşiktaş	Has (69)	
1960/61	25-12-1960	İnönü	Fenerbahçe	1–3	Beşiktaş	Gündüz (61)	Özacar (64, 68, 71)
1960/61	03-05-1961	Ankara 19 Mayıs	Beşiktaş	0–1	Fenerbahçe	Kiremitçi (27)	
1961/62	26-11-1961	İnönü	Beşiktaş	1–0	Fenerbahçe		Özacar (65 (pen.))
1961/62	13-06-1962	İnönü	Fenerbahçe	0–2	Beşiktaş		Özacar (10), Önüt (37)
1962/63	11-11-1962	İnönü	Fenerbahçe	1–1	Beşiktaş	Erdem (65)	Özacar (58)
1962/63	25-02-1963	İnönü	Beşiktaş	2–1	Fenerbahçe	Doğan (72)	Önüt (43, 45)
1962/63	06-05-1963	İnönü	Fenerbahçe	2–0	Beşiktaş	Kalkavan (27), Küçükandonyadis (54)	
1962/63	05-06-1963	İnönü	Beşiktaş	2–2	Fenerbahçe	Dirimlili (30), Soydan (63)	Önüt (68, 87)
1963/64	12-01-1964	İnönü	Fenerbahçe	0–0	Beşiktaş		
1963/64	17-02-1964	İnönü	Beşiktaş	0–1	Fenerbahçe	Birol (90)	
1964/65	29-11-1964	İnönü	Beşiktaş	1–1	Fenerbahçe	Şengül (11),	İçten (8)
1964/65	13-06-1965	İnönü	Fenerbahçe	1–0	Beşiktaş	Yelken (86)	
1965/66	07-11-1965	İnönü	Fenerbahçe	0–2	Beşiktaş		Karadoğan (50), A. Şahin (75)
1965/66	01-05-1966	İnönü	Beşiktaş	0–0	Fenerbahçe		
1966/67	01-01-1967	Ali Sami Yen	Beşiktaş	0–1	Fenerbahçe	Çevrim (69)	
1966/67	25-06-1967	Ali Sami Yen	Fenerbahçe	0–0	Beşiktaş		
1967/68	10-12-1967	İnönü	Fenerbahçe	3–2	Beşiktaş	Altıparmak (2, 76), Doğan (57)	Sarıalioğlu (44), Özacar (72)
1967/68	28-04-1968	İnönü	Beşiktaş	0–0	Fenerbahçe		
1968/69	15-12-1968	İnönü	Beşiktaş	1–2	Fenerbahçe	Doğan (25), Mumcuoğlu (49)	Okyar (42 (pen.))
1968/69	27-04-1969	İnönü	Fenerbahçe	0–1	Beşiktaş		Karadoğan (54)
1969/70	11-01-1970	İnönü	Beşiktaş	0–1	Fenerbahçe	Doğan (60)	
1969/70	31-05-1970	İnönü	Fenerbahçe	0–1	Beşiktaş		Erdener (25)
1970/71	10-01-1971	İnönü	Beşiktaş	0–2	Fenerbahçe	Acar (4, 41)	
1970/71	06-06-1971	İnönü	Fenerbahçe	1–0	Beşiktaş	Altıparmak (80)	
1971/72	19-12-1971	İnönü	Beşiktaş	1–0	Fenerbahçe		Acuner (34 (pen.))
1971/72	07-05-1972	İnönü	Fenerbahçe	0–0	Beşiktaş		
1972/73	05-11-1972	İnönü	Beşiktaş	0–0	Fenerbahçe		
1972/73	01-04-1973	İnönü	Fenerbahçe	1–0	Beşiktaş	Arpacıoğlu (77)	
1973/74	16-12-1973	İnönü	Beşiktaş	0–0	Fenerbahçe		
1973/74	28-04-1974	İnönü	Fenerbahçe	1–1	Beşiktaş	Turan (43)	Milić (58)
1974/75	15-12-1974	İnönü	Beşiktaş	2–1	Fenerbahçe	Çelik (73)	Alayoğlu (35 (pen.)), Şener (71)
1974/75	11-05-1975	İnönü	Fenerbahçe	0–0	Beşiktaş		
1975/76	28-09-1975	İnönü	Beşiktaş	1–1	Fenerbahçe	Turan (44),	Ozan (74)
1975/76	07-03-1976	İnönü	Fenerbahçe	3–0	Beşiktaş	Turan (34, 79, 86)	
1976/77	07-11-1976	İnönü	Beşiktaş	1–1	Fenerbahçe	Turan (40 (pen.)),	Kaynak (72)
1976/77	03-04-1977	İnönü	Fenerbahçe	1–1	Beşiktaş	Turan (61)	Ş.Kartal (76)
1977/78	06-11-1977	İnönü	Fenerbahçe	1–0	Beşiktaş	Turan (50)	
1977/78	09-04-1978	İnönü	Beşiktaş	0–1	Fenerbahçe	Turan (25)	
1978/79	01-10-1978	İnönü	Fenerbahçe	0–0	Beşiktaş		
1978/79	11-03-1979	İnönü	Beşiktaş	1–1	Fenerbahçe	Denizci (26)	Doğan (78)
1979/80	13-10-1979	İnönü	Fenerbahçe	1–2	Beşiktaş	Çetiner (86)	Ekşi (32 (pen.)), Kılıç (65)
1979/80	30-03-1980	İnönü	Beşiktaş	1–1	Fenerbahçe	Turan (10),	Ergün (32)
1980/81	26-10-1980	İnönü	Fenerbahçe	1–0	Beşiktaş	Denizci (88)	
1980/81	29-03-1981	İnönü	Beşiktaş	1–0	Fenerbahçe		Ş.Kartal (52)
1981/82	22-11-1981	İnönü	Fenerbahçe	0–1	Beşiktaş		Ekşi (24)
1981/82	09-05-1982	İnönü	Beşiktaş	0–0	Fenerbahçe		
1982/83	10-10-1982	İnönü	Beşiktaş	0–1	Fenerbahçe	Kocabıyık (63)	
1982/83	26-03-1983	Fenerbahçe	Fenerbahçe	1–1	Beşiktaş	Hacıoğlu (26)	Ergün (36 (pen.))
1983/84	17-12-1983	Ali Sami Yen	Beşiktaş	0–1	Fenerbahçe	Kızıltan (41)	
1983/84	20-05-1984	Fenerbahçe	Fenerbahçe	1–1	Beşiktaş	Çakar (49)	Šećerbegović (41)
1984/85	16-12-1984	İnönü	Fenerbahçe	0–0	Beşiktaş		
1984/85	20-05-1985	İnönü	Beşiktaş	2–2	Fenerbahçe	Yetkiner (24), Tüfekçi (75)	Kovačević (43), Ergün (55)
1985/86	17-11-1985	Fenerbahçe	Fenerbahçe	0–0	Beşiktaş		
1985/86	13-04-1986	İnönü	Beşiktaş	3–1	Fenerbahçe	Çorlu (71)	Doğan (3), Tekin (38), Uçar (55)
1986/87	07-12-1986	Fenerbahçe	Fenerbahçe	0–1	Beşiktaş		Çalımbay (27 (pen.))
1986/87	16-05-1987	Ali Sami Yen	Beşiktaş	4–0	Fenerbahçe		Çalımbay (14 (pen.)), Uçar (28, 88), Tekin (78)
1987/88	21-11-1987	Fenerbahçe	Fenerbahçe	0–4	Beşiktaş		Uçar (20, 39, 86), Önatlı (47)
1987/88	17-04-1988	İnönü	Beşiktaş	2–1	Fenerbahçe	İ.Kartal (21 (pen.))	Gültiken (77, 84)
1988/89	16-10-1988	İnönü	Beşiktaş	2–0	Fenerbahçe		Ferdinand (11), Uçar (21)
1988/89	18-03-1989	Fenerbahçe	Fenerbahçe	2–1	Beşiktaş	Kocaman (23), Tecimer (64)	Gültiken (15)
1989/90	06-01-1990	Fenerbahçe	Fenerbahçe	1–5	Beşiktaş	Çetin (7)	Wilson (5), Gültiken (20, 51), Tekin (58), Uçar (72)
1989/90	12-05-1990	İnönü	Beşiktaş	3–1	Fenerbahçe	Şar (30)	Uçar (31), Tekin (45, 70)
1990/91	08-12-1990	İnönü	Beşiktaş	1–1	Fenerbahçe	İ.Kartal (71)	Tekin (22)
1990/91	11-05-1991	Fenerbahçe	Fenerbahçe	0–2	Beşiktaş		Güveneroğlu (8), Uçar (86)
1991/92	16-11-1991	Fenerbahçe	Fenerbahçe	2–2	Beşiktaş	Kocaman (30, 48)	Özdilek (1, 48)
1991/92	11-04-1992	İnönü	Beşiktaş	1–0	Fenerbahçe		Önatlı (89)
1992/93	22-11-1992	Fenerbahçe	Fenerbahçe	1–1	Beşiktaş	Gérson (13)	Madida (38)
1992/93	09-05-1993	İnönü	Beşiktaş	2–0	Fenerbahçe		Uçar (20), Yalçın (23)
1993/94	11-12-1993	İnönü	Beşiktaş	1–2	Fenerbahçe	Yağcıoğlu (76), Okechukwu (90)	Nartallo (45)
1993/94	07-05-1994	Fenerbahçe	Fenerbahçe	2–1	Beşiktaş	Kocaman (33 (pen.)), Çolak (70)	Nartallo (51)
1994/95	04-12-1994	Fenerbahçe	Fenerbahçe	1–1	Beşiktaş	Havutçu (68)	Sverrisson (69)
1994/95	14-05-1995	İnönü	Beşiktaş	0–0	Fenerbahçe		
1995/96	30-10-1995	Fenerbahçe	Fenerbahçe	2–0	Beşiktaş	Høgh (42), Atkinson (76)	
1995/96	10-03-1996	İnönü	Beşiktaş	1–2	Fenerbahçe	Bolić (1), Çetin (55)	Johnsen (89)
1996/97	14-09-1996	Fenerbahçe	Fenerbahçe	0–1	Beşiktaş		Yalçın (89)
1996/97	16-02-1997	İnönü	Beşiktaş	1–0	Fenerbahçe		Sağlam (84)
1997/98	06-12-1997	İnönü	Beşiktaş	2–2	Fenerbahçe	Bulut (8), Sancaklı (49)	Sağlam (15), Letchkov (42)
1997/98	26-04-1998	Fenerbahçe	Fenerbahçe	2–0	Beşiktaş	Sağlam (39 (o.g.)), Bulut (62)	
1998/99	25-10-1998	İnönü	Beşiktaş	3–2	Fenerbahçe	Moshoeu (14), Dimas (71)	Amokachi (22, 59 (pen.)), Özdilek (88)
1998/99	04-04-1999	Şükrü Saracoğlu	Fenerbahçe	1–2	Beşiktaş	Bulut (65)	Özdilek (6 (pen.)), Akman (55)
1999/2000	16-01-2000	Şükrü Saracoğlu	Fenerbahçe	2–1	Beşiktaş	Moldovan (21), Bolić (31)	Akman (52)
1999/2000	14-05-2000	İnönü	Beşiktaş	1–3	Fenerbahçe	Preko (42, 63), Moldovan (84)	Münch (12 (pen.))
2000/01	16-09-2000	İnönü	Beşiktaş	3–0	Fenerbahçe		Kahveci (17), Havutçu (49), Nouma (67)
2000/01	24-02-2001	Şükrü Saracoğlu	Fenerbahçe	3–1	Beşiktaş	Revivo (49), S. Akın (69), Şimşek (89)	Sülün (60)
2001/02	02-12-2001	Şükrü Saracoğlu	Fenerbahçe	1–2	Beşiktaş	Ercan (49)	Ronaldo (56, 77)
2001/02	14-04-2002	İnönü	Beşiktaş	0–2	Fenerbahçe	S. Akın (43, 59)	
2002/03	02-02-2003	Şükrü Saracoğlu	Fenerbahçe	0–1	Beşiktaş		Dursun (56)
2002/03	20-04-2003	İnönü	Beşiktaş	2–0	Fenerbahçe		Nouma (7), Yalçın (64)
2003/04	30-11-2003	Şükrü Saracoğlu	Fenerbahçe	2–2	Beşiktaş	Van Hooijdonk (62, 68)	Yalçın (52), Hassan (84)
2003/04	25-04-2004	İnönü	Beşiktaş	1–3	Fenerbahçe	S. Akın (31, 58), Şanlı (60)	Ilie (90)
2004/05	30-10-2004	İnönü	Beşiktaş	2–1	Fenerbahçe	Van Hooijdonk (70 (pen.))	Carew (54), Doğan (62)
2004/05	17-04-2005	Şükrü Saracoğlu	Fenerbahçe	3–4	Beşiktaş	Luciano (34), Alex (70, 84 (pen.))	Metin (27), Carew (45), İ. Akın (76), Avcı (90)
2005/06	18-09-2005	İnönü	Beşiktaş	1–2	Fenerbahçe	Anelka (18), Şanlı (90)	Kléberson (90)
2005/06	26-02-2006	Şükrü Saracoğlu	Fenerbahçe	2–2	Beşiktaş	Şanlı (57), Nobre (76)	Yalçın (67, 72)
2006/07	19-11-2006	Şükrü Saracoğlu	Fenerbahçe	0–0	Beşiktaş		
2006/07	05-05-2007	İnönü	Beşiktaş	0–1	Fenerbahçe	Kežman (12)	
2007/08	03-11-2007	Şükrü Saracoğlu	Fenerbahçe	2–1	Beşiktaş	Deivid (29), Şentürk (60)	Bobô (3)
2007/08	29-03-2008	İnönü	Beşiktaş	1–2	Fenerbahçe	Alex (11, 80)	Özkan (74)
2008/09	29-11-2008	Şükrü Saracoğlu	Fenerbahçe	2–1	Beşiktaş	S. Şahin (11), Güiza (27)	Nobre (21)
2008/09	03-05-2009	İnönü	Beşiktaş	1–2	Fenerbahçe	Güiza (32), Şentürk (54)	Hološko (64)
2009/10	21-11-2009	İnönü	Beşiktaş	3–0	Fenerbahçe		Fink (53), Bobô (57), İnceman (82)
2009/10	18-04-2010	Şükrü Saracoğlu	Fenerbahçe	1–0	Beşiktaş	Alex (2)	-
2010/11	19-09-2010	Şükrü Saracoğlu	Fenerbahçe	1–1	Beşiktaş	Niang (26)	Guti (86 (pen.))
2010/11	20-02-2011	İnönü	Beşiktaş	2–4	Fenerbahçe	Uysal (5 (o.g.)), Alex (64 (pen.), 72, 74)	Dağ (43), Toraman (49)
2011/12	27-10-2011	İnönü	Beşiktaş	2–2	Fenerbahçe	Alex (60), Cristian (88)	Simão (12), Almeida (72)
2011/12	05-02-2012	Şükrü Saracoğlu	Fenerbahçe	2–0	Beşiktaş	Yobo (14), Sow (90)	
2011/12	29-04-2012	Şükrü Saracoğlu	Fenerbahçe	2–1	Beşiktaş	Stoch (57), Korkmaz (83 (o.g.))	Korkmaz (54)
2011/12	03-05-2012	İnönü	Beşiktaş	1–0	Fenerbahçe		Almeida (45)
2012/13	07-10-2012	Şükrü Saracoğlu	Fenerbahçe	3–0	Beşiktaş	Sow (13), Gönül (40, 59)	
2012/13	03-03-2013	İnönü	Beşiktaş	3–2	Fenerbahçe	Sow (24, 63)	Kuyt (40 (o.g.)), Niang (60), Şahan (90)
2013/14	30-11-2013	Şükrü Saracoğlu	Fenerbahçe	3–3	Beşiktaş	Emenike (12), Sow (37), Kuyt (83)	Şahan (9), Almeida (43, 45)
2013/14	20-04-2014	Atatürk Olympic	Beşiktaş	1–1	Fenerbahçe	Sow (24)	Ramon (44)
2014/15	02-11-2014	Atatürk Olympic	Beşiktaş	0–2	Fenerbahçe	Emenike (3), Sow (85)	
2014/15	22-03-2015	Şükrü Saracoğlu	Fenerbahçe	1–0	Beşiktaş	Sow (90)	
2015/16	27-09-2015	Atatürk Olympic	Beşiktaş	3–2	Fenerbahçe	Tošić (32 (o.g.)), Van Persie (65)	Kjær (20 (o.g.)), Gómez (24, 74)
2015/16	29-02-2016	Şükrü Saracoğlu	Fenerbahçe	2–0	Beşiktaş	Şen (3), Nani (82)	
2016/17	03-12-2016	Şükrü Saracoğlu	Fenerbahçe	0–0	Beşiktaş		
2016/17	07-05-2017	Vodafone Park	Beşiktaş	1–1	Fenerbahçe	Marcelo (90 (o.g.))	Aboubakar (45)
2017/18	23-09-2017	Şükrü Saracoğlu	Fenerbahçe	2–1	Beşiktaş	Giuliano (20 (pen.)), Janssen (86 (pen.))	Babel (87)
2017/18	25-02-2018	Vodafone Park	Beşiktaş	3–1	Fenerbahçe	Fernandão (8)	Vida (49), Quaresma (77, 90)
2018/19	24-09-2018	Şükrü Saracoğlu	Fenerbahçe	1–1	Beşiktaş	Ayew (71)	Babel (40)
2018/19	25-02-2019	Vodafone Park	Beşiktaş	3–3	Fenerbahçe	Zajc (55), Çiftpınar (61), Kaldırım (67),	Gönül (10), Yılmaz (18 (pen.), 45)
2019/20	22-12-2019	Şükrü Saracoğlu	Fenerbahçe	3–1	Beşiktaş	Kruse (23 (pen.)), Tufan (32), Muriqi (58)	Hutchinson (45)
2019/20	19-07-2020	Vodafone Park	Beşiktaş	2–0	Fenerbahçe		Vida (63), Gönül (70)
2020/21	29-11-2020	Şükrü Saracoğlu	Fenerbahçe	3–4	Beşiktaş	Cissé (34), Tufan (68, 90+7 (pen.))	Aboubakar (4, 20), Uysal (53), N'Sakala (88)
2020/21	21-03-2021	Vodafone Park	Beşiktaş	1–1	Fenerbahçe	Tufan (89)	Vida (48)
2021/22	19-12-2021	Şükrü Saracoğlu	Fenerbahçe	2–2	Beşiktaş	Özil (14 (pen.)), Berisha (30)	Souza (25, 59)
2021/22	08-05-2022	Vodafone Park	Beşiktaş	1–1	Fenerbahçe	Novák (6)	Ghezzal (31 (pen.))
2022/23	02-10-2022	Vodafone Park	Beşiktaş	0–0	Fenerbahçe		
2022/23	02-04-2023	Şükrü Saracoğlu	Fenerbahçe	2–4	Beşiktaş	Valencia (41 (pen.)), Kahveci (90+5)	Tosun (58, 62), Redmond (75), Aboubakar (90+1)
2023/24	09-12-2023	Beşiktaş	Beşiktaş	1–3	Fenerbahçe	Oxlade-Chamberlain (24 (pen.))	Džeko (10), Tadić (63 (pen.)), Szymański (90+6)
2023/24	27-04-2024	Şükrü Saracoğlu	Fenerbahçe	2–1	Beşiktaş	Batshuayi (30), Kahveci (69)	Tosun (82)
2024/25	07-12-2024	Tüpraş Stadyumu	Beşiktaş	1–0	Fenerbahçe		Oxlade-Chamberlain (73)
2024/25	04-05-2025	Şükrü Saracoğlu	Fenerbahçe	0–1	Beşiktaş		Fernandes (44)
2025/26	02-11-2025	Tüpraş Stadyumu	Beşiktaş	2–3	Fenerbahçe	Yüksek (32), Asensio (45+3), Durán (83)	Touré (5), Topçu (22)
2025/26	05-04-2026	Şükrü Saracoğlu	Fenerbahçe	1–0	Beşiktaş	Aktürkoğlu (90+11 (pen.))	
2026/27	05-09-2026	Şükrü Saracoğlu	Fenerbahçe	1–2	Beşiktaş	Škriniar (26)	Yılmaz (38), Vlahović (73)

== Turkish Cup matches ==
Season	Date	Stadium	Home team	Score	Away team	Fenerbahçe scorers	Beşiktaş scorers	Winner
1977/78	12-02-1978	İnönü	Fenerbahçe	2–1	Beşiktaş	Turan (8), Verel (105)	Paunović (82)	FB
1978/79	21-02-1979	İnönü	Fenerbahçe	0–0	Beşiktaş			FB
1978/79	07-03-1979	İnönü	Beşiktaş	0–1	Fenerbahçe	Batmaz (4 (o.g.))		FB
1982/83	04-05-1983	Fenerbahçe	Fenerbahçe	3–0	Beşiktaş	awarded 3–0		FB
1982/83	18-05-1983	Ali Sami Yen	Beşiktaş	2–1	Fenerbahçe	Yula (4)	Ergün (35 (pen.)), Doğan (75)	FB
1983/84	09-05-1984	Fenerbahçe	Fenerbahçe	0–0	Beşiktaş			BJK
1983/84	16-05-1984	İnönü	Beşiktaş	4–2	Fenerbahçe	Pamiroğlu (24), Arıca (81)	Šećerbegović (31, 99), Demirer (62 (pen.)), Doğan (95)	BJK
1988/89	21-06-1989	Fenerbahçe	Fenerbahçe	0–1	Beşiktaş	-	Ferdinand (15)	BJK
1988/89	25-06-1989	İnönü	Beşiktaş	2–1	Fenerbahçe	Çetin (46)	Gültiken (76), Uçar (86)	BJK
1989/90	21-03-1990	İnönü	Beşiktaş	3–0	Fenerbahçe		Barut (10), Uçar (29), Özdilek (72)	BJK
1992/93	10-02-1993	İnönü	Beşiktaş	1–0	Fenerbahçe		Uçar (28)	BJK
1992/93	17-03-1993	Fenerbahçe	Fenerbahçe	1–1	Beşiktaş	Çolak (56)	Madida (67)	BJK
1993/94	30-01-1994	İnönü	Beşiktaş	2–1	Fenerbahçe	Uygun (55)	Günçar (12), Madida (20)	BJK
1996/97	22-01-1997	Fenerbahçe	Fenerbahçe	2–2	Beşiktaş	Daşgün (40), Kostadinov (78)	Topraktepe (18), Akbaş (49 (o.g.))	BJK
1996/97	05-02-1997	İnönü	Beşiktaş	2–1	Fenerbahçe	Sancaklı (38)	Amokachi (18), Özdilek (51)	BJK
2005/06	03-05-2006	İzmir Atatürk	Fenerbahçe	2–3	Beşiktaş	Alex (54), Yozgatlı (80)	Metin (31, 115), Güleç (35)	BJK
2006/07	11-04-2007	İnönü	Beşiktaş	1–0	Fenerbahçe		Bobô (82)	BJK
2006/07	26-04-2007	Fenerbahçe	Fenerbahçe	1–1	Beşiktaş	Metin (56)	Nobre (102)	BJK
2008/09	13-05-2009	İzmir Atatürk	Beşiktaş	4–2	Fenerbahçe	Güiza (27), Alex (90)	Şimşek (6), Bobô (56, 73), Hološko (80)	BJK
2016/17	05-02-2017	Vodafone Park	Beşiktaş	0–1	Fenerbahçe	Van Persie (71)		FB
2017/18	01-03-2018	Vodafone Park	Beşiktaş	2–2	Fenerbahçe	Soldado (17), Özbayraklı (45)	Negredo (14), Talisca (82)	FB
2017/18	03-05-2018	Fenerbahçe	Fenerbahçe	3–0	Beşiktaş	awarded 3–0		FB
2025/26	23-12-2025	Fenerbahçe	Fenerbahçe	1–2	Beşiktaş	Asensio (43 (pen.))	Černý (33, 90+1)	BJK

== Super Cup matches ==
Season	Date	Stadium	Home team	Score	Away team	Fenerbahçe scorers	Beşiktaş scorers
1974	08-06-1974	Ankara 19 Mayıs	Beşiktaş	3–0	Fenerbahçe		Yılmaz (20), Isıgöllü (36), Şen (72)
1975	11-06-1975	Cebeci İnönü	Fenerbahçe	2–0	Beşiktaş	Arpacıoğlu (21), Turan (53)	
1989	26-08-1989	Ankara 19 Mayıs	Fenerbahçe	0–1	Beşiktaş		Gültiken (53)
1990	30-05-1990	Ankara 19 Mayıs	Beşiktaş	2–3	Fenerbahçe	Hakan (7), Çorlu (38), Kocaman (56)	Tekin (63, 66)
2007	05-08-2007	RheinEnergie	Fenerbahçe	2–1	Beşiktaş	Deivid (14), Kežman (86)	Bobô (20)
2009	02-08-2009	Atatürk Olympic	Beşiktaş	0–2	Fenerbahçe	Alex (75, 90)	

== Head-to-head ranking in Süper Lig ==
P.	59	60	61	62	63	64	65	66	67	68	69	70	71	72	73	74	75	76	77	78	79	80	81	82	83	84	85	86	87	88	89	90	91	92	93	94	95	96	97	98	99	00	01	02	03	04	05	06	07	08	09	10	11	12	13	14	15	16	17	18	19	20	21	22	23	24	25	26
1	1	1	1			1	1	1	1	1		1				1	1			1				1	1		1	1			1	1	1	1			1	1					1		1	1	1		1		1		1			1		1	1				1					
2		2		2	2	2	2		2	2			2		2	2		2	2			2				2	2		2	2	2	2		2	2	2			2	2	2	2		2				2	2	2		2		2	2		2	2		2				2	2	2	2	2
3	3		3	3	3						3			3							3			3														3	3		3			3		3		3		3					3	3	3		3		3	3	3		3			
4								4			4			4					4							4										4	4					4	4				4				4	4		4						4							4	4
5																	5			5			5		5			5	5				5		5																		5															
6													6		6																									6					6																6			6		6		
7																																																														7						
8																														8																																						
9												9									9																																															
10																							10																																													
11																		11				11																																														
12																																																																				
13																																																																				
14																																																																				
15																																																																				
16																																																																				
17																																																																				
18																																																																				
19																																																																				
20																																																																				
21																																																																				

• Total: Beşiktaş with 25 higher finishes, Fenerbahçe with 43 higher finishes (as of the end of the 2025–26 season).

== Biggest difference wins ==
Fenerbahçe SK vs Beşiktaş JK
- Event: Friendly
Fenerbahçe	Beşiktaş
7	0
- Date: 6 December 1958
- Venue: Mithatpaşa Stadium, Istanbul
- Referee: Cihat Ergün
- Attendance: 8251

Beşiktaş JK vs Fenerbahçe SK
- Event: 1941 Dörtler Cup
Beşiktaş	Fenerbahçe
7	1
- Date: 23 March 1941
- Venue: Şeref Stadium, Istanbul
- Attendance: 7000

=== Fenerbahçe 7–0 Beşiktaş (1958) ===
Fenerbahçe 7–0 Beşiktaş was a friendly match between Fenerbahçe and Beşiktaş in 1958. The match was played on 6 December 1958 at Mithatpaşa Stadium. As Turkey's A and B national teams were to face Bulgaria in Ankara and Plovdiv the following day, both teams lined up with the 2-3-5 formation and with extremely unusual squads. It went down in history as the most different victory in the Fenerbahçe-Beşiktaş derby of all time. Fenerbahçe's goals were scored by Mustafa Güven (2), Hüseyin Yazıcı, Avni Kalkavan, Ceyhun Eriş, Yüksel Gündüz and Mahir Güven, with 6 of the goals being scored in the first half.

=== Beşiktaş 7-1 Fenerbahçe (1941) ===
Beşiktaş 7–1 Fenerbahçe was a Dörtler Cup match between Fenerbahçe and Beşiktaş in 1941. The match was played on 23 March 1941, going down in history as Beşiktaş's most different victory against Fenerbahçe.

Beşiktaş's goals were scored by Sabri Gençsoy (3), Hakkı Yeten (2) and Şeref Görkey (2). The first goal of the game was scored by Gençsoy in the 5th minute, assisted by Şükrü Gülesin. Before Fenerbahçe players could recover from the goal, Görkey took advantage of a defensive mistake and doubled the difference. Then Hakkı scored once again with a shot from the top of the penalty area line making it 3–0.

In the 35th minute Naci Bastoncu scored Fenerbahçe's first and only goal and the first half ended with Beşiktaş's 3–1 lead. Beşiktaş started the second half very fast and took a 5–1 lead with Sabri Gençsoy's goals in the 49th and 53rd minutes. In the 68th and 75th minutes, Hakkı Yeten and Şeref Görkey scored two more goals and Beşiktaş won the match 7-1 and took the Dörtler Cup trophy to its museum.

1941 Dörtler Cup
23 March 1941
15:00 (UTC+03:00)

Beşiktaş	7–1	Fenerbahçe
Gençsoy 5'; Görkey 24'; Yeten 29'; Gençsoy 49'; Gençsoy 53'; Yeten 68'; Görkey 75'	Report	Bastoncu 35'

Şeref Stadium
Attendance: 7,000
Referee: Saim Duransoy

GK	(Turkey) Mehmet Ali Tanman
DF	(Turkey) Hristo Kostanda
DF	(Turkey) Yavuz Üreten
MF	(Turkey) Rıfat Atakanı
MF	(Turkey) Halil Köksalan
MF	(Turkey) Memduh Ün
FW	(Turkey) Şükrü Gülesin
FW	(Turkey) Şeref Görkey
FW	(Turkey) Saim Saper
FW	(Turkey) Hakkı Yeten
FW	(Turkey) Sabri Gençsoy
Manager:
(Turkey) Refik Osman Top

GK	(Turkey) Cihat Arman
DF	(Turkey) Naci Erdem
DF	(Turkey) Lebip Elmas
MF	(Turkey) Hüseyin Yalçınkaya
MF	(Turkey) Fikret Arıcan
MF	(Turkey) Ömer Boncuk
FW	(Turkey) Rebii Erkal
FW	(Turkey) Naci Bastoncu
FW	(Turkey) Yaşar Yalçınpınar
FW	(Turkey) Niyazi Öztunç
FW	(Turkey) Fikret Kırcan
Manager:
(Turkey) Fikret Arıcan

== Statistics ==
=== Head-to-head ===
As of 4 May 2025

	Matches	Wins Beşiktaş	Draws	Wins Fenerbahçe	Goals Beşiktaş	Goals Fenerbahçe
Süper Lig	139	44	45	50	161	161
Turkish Cup	22	11	6	5	32	26
Turkish Super Cup	6	2	0	4	7	9
Total Süper Lig & Cup	166	57	51	58	198	193
Istanbul Football League	61	26	15	20	81	85
Turkish National Division	22	10	4	8	40	38
Prime Minister's Cup	2	2	0	0	6	2
Spor Toto Cup	2	2	0	0	2	0
Total official matches	253	97	70	86	327	318
Friendly	109	32	27	50	133	183
Total matches	362	129	97	136	459	501

=== Biggest wins (5+ goals) ===
Result	Date
Fenerbahçe 7–0 Beşiktaş	6 December 1958
Beşiktaş 7–1 Fenerbahçe	23 March 1941
Fenerbahçe 5–0 Beşiktaş	17 January 1930

=== Most consecutive wins ===
Games	Club	Period
7	Beşiktaş	21 August 1989 – 12 May 1990
6	Fenerbahçe	5 May 2007 – 3 May 2009
5	Fenerbahçe	1 April 1973 – 26 August 1973

=== Most consecutive draws ===
Games	Period
8	20 May 1984 – 17 November 1985
4	5 December 1954 – 4 December 1955

=== Most consecutive matches without a draw ===
Games	Period
21	19 January 1986 – 8 August 1990
12	15 June 1941 – 24 October 1943
11	29 September 1946 – 1 May 1949
10	18 March 1959 – 26 November 1961
10	5 May 2007 – 18 April 2010

=== Longest undefeated runs ===
Games	Club	Period
17	Fenerbahçe	8 November 1954 – 3 January 1960
12	Beşiktaş	19 May 1943 – 16 November 1945
12	Beşiktaş	15 January 1984 – 17 August 1986
12	Beşiktaş	30 May 1990 – 11 December 1993

=== Highest scoring matches ===
Goals	Home	Score	Away	Date
9	Beşiktaş	5–4	Fenerbahçe	11 August 1974

=== Most appearances ===
Player	Games	Club
Rıza Çalımbay	62	Beşiktaş
Hakkı Yeten	58	Beşiktaş
Müjdat Yetkiner	51	Fenerbahçe
Naci Bastoncu	50	Fenerbahçe

Last update: 7 October 2012

=== Top scorers ===
Player	Goals	Club
Hakkı Yeten	32	Beşiktaş
Cemil Turan	19	Fenerbahçe
Şeref Görkey	13	Beşiktaş
Metin Tekin	13	Beşiktaş
Alex	13	Fenerbahçe
Şevket Yorulmaz	10	Beşiktaş

Last update: 7 October 2012

=== Most goals by a player in a match ===
Goals	Player	Club	Score	Date
4	Zeki Rıza Sporel	Fenerbahçe	4–1	18 June 1926

== Players for both teams ==
Players from Beşiktaş to Fenerbahçe

- (Turkey) Refik Osman Top
- (Turkey) Saadet Tokcan
- (Turkey) Taci Eke
- (Turkey) Halil Köksalan
- (Turkey) Mustafa Güven
- (Turkey) Güray Erdemir
- (Turkey) Selim Soydan
- (Turkey) Şenol Birol
- (Turkey) Birol Pekel
- (Turkey) Engin İpekoğlu
- (Turkey) Feyyaz Uçar
- (Turkey) Saffet Sancaklı
- (Turkey) Sergen Yalçın
- (Turkey) Alpay Özalan
- (Turkey) Oktay Derelioğlu
- (Turkey) Tümer Metin
- (Turkey) Burak Yılmaz
- (Turkey) Egemen Korkmaz
- (Turkey) İsmail Köybaşı
- (Turkey) Tolgay Arslan
- (Argentina) José Sosa
- (Belgium) Michy Batshuayi
- (Turkey) Umut Nayir
- (Turkey) Cenk Tosun
- (Brazil) Talisca

Players from Fenerbahçe to Beşiktaş

- (Turkey) Özcan Arkoç
- (Turkey) Ali Soydan
- (Turkey) Gürcan Berk
- (Turkey) Ali Kemal Denizci
- (Turkey) Adem İbrahimoğlu
- (Turkey) Tayfur Havutçu
- (Turkey) Ahmet Yıldırım
- (Turkey) Emre Aşık
- (Turkey) Ali Güneş
- (Turkey) Murat Şahin
- (Germany) Mustafa Doğan
- (Turkey) Tayfun Korkut
- (Turkey) Fahri Tatan
- (Turkey) Mert Nobre
- (Turkey) Mehmet Yozgatlı
- (Turkey) Rüştü Reçber
- (Turkey) Yusuf Şimşek
- (Turkey) Mehmet Aurélio
- (Turkey) Uğur Boral
- (Senegal) Mamadou Niang
- (Turkey) Gökhan Gönül
- (Turkey) Caner Erkin
- (Netherlands) Jeremain Lens
- (Brazil) Josef de Souza
- (Turkey) Salih Uçan
- (Turkey) Mehmet Topal
- (Turkey) Mert Günok

Managers for both teams

- (Turkey) Cihat Arman
- (Turkey) Enver Katip
- (Socialist Federal Republic of Yugoslavia) Abdulah Gegić
- (Socialist Federal Republic of Yugoslavia) Branko Stanković
- (Germany) Christoph Daum
- (Turkey) Mustafa Denizli

== See also ==
- The Intercontinental Derby
- Beşiktaş–Galatasaray rivalry
- Major football rivalries
- Big Three (Turkey)
