= Beşiktaş–Galatasaray rivalry =

Turkish football rivalry

Beşiktaş JK vs Galatasaray SK
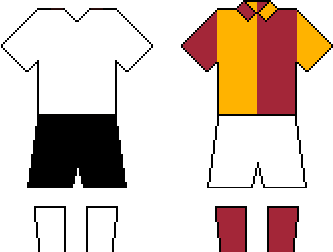
- Location: Istanbul, Turkey
- Teams: Beşiktaş; Galatasaray
- First meeting: Beşiktaş 2–0 Galatasaray; 22 August 1924; 102 years ago
- Latest meeting: Beşiktaş 0–1 Galatasaray; Süper Lig (7 March 2026)

Statistics
- Total meetings: 360
- Most wins: Galatasaray (129)
- Most player appearances: Şeref Görkey (63)
- All-time series: Beşiktaş: 116; Drawn: 115; Galatasaray: 129
- Largest victory: Galatasaray 9–2 Beşiktaş (30 June 1940)

Beşiktaş–Galatasaray is a Turkish football rivalry involving two of the most successful clubs in the Süper Lig. It is also a local derby, one of many involving Istanbul clubs.

== History ==
The first game played between the two sides was an Istanbul Football League game on 22 August 1924. The match, staged at Taksim Stadium, finished 2–0 to Beşiktaş. Galatasaray marked their first victory over Beşiktaş when they defeated them 6–1 in semi-final of the Istanbul Football League on 31 July 1925.

=== Fan's rivalry ===
Beşiktaş and Galatasaray are two of the most popular Turkish clubs; both sides have large fanbases that follow them in domestic and international matches. Football hooliganism is a very common phenomenon between their fans in recent years, featuring anything from breaking seats, cursing, fighting, fireworks and street rioting. Beşiktaş' fans are known for their chanting supporting and are widely known as the fiercest fans in Europe. Galatasaray's fans are also well known and are similar to Beşiktaş' fans with their chants.

=== Football rivalry ===
Both clubs compete each other for the title of the most successful football club in Turkey. Galatasaray is the more successful of the two teams, winning 59 official titles compared to Beşiktaş's 35, and is also the most successful in head-to-head matches. Galatasaray boast for their achievement to win the 2000 UEFA Cup Final and the 2000 UEFA Super Cup, being the only Turkish side to have made them so far.

== Culture ==
Both clubs are located on the European part of Istanbul. Beşiktaş JK were founded in the municipality of Beşiktaş, while Galatasaray SK were founded in the district of Galatasaray. Both clubs naturally draw the majority of their support from the side of the city that they are native to, but maintain a significant majority of support drawn from the rest of Turkey.

== Honours ==
As of 9 May 2026

- Numbers with this background indicate the record in the competition.

Beşiktaş	Competition	Galatasaray
National
16	Süper Lig	26
11	Turkish Cup	19
10	Turkish Super Cup	17
3	Turkish National Division (defunct)	1
2	Turkish Football Championship (defunct)	—
6	Prime Minister's Cup (defunct)	5
3	Spor Toto Cup (defunct)	—
1	Ataturk Cup (defunct)	—
—	50th Anniversary Cup (defunct)	1
52	Aggregate	69
Domestic
13	Istanbul Football League (defunct)	15
2	Istanbul Cup (defunct)	2
15	Aggregate	17
European
—	UEFA Europa League	1
—	UEFA Super Cup	1
—	Aggregate	2
67	Total aggregate	88

Note: Calculated based on official tournaments.

== Supporters ==
- A poll involving 1.4 million people asked for the team the support in Turkey by bilyoner.com showed that alongside Galatasaray with 35%, Fenerbahçe with 34% and Beşiktaş with 19% make up most fans.
- Galatasaray and Beşiktaş are followed by large masses on social media. Galatasaray's social media accounts are followed by more people.

Beşiktaş	Social media	Galatasaray
6.6 Mn	Instagram	15.6 Mn
5.9 Mn	X	15.1 Mn
5.4 Mn	Facebook	11 Mn
1.3 Mn	YouTube	3 Mn
19.2 Mn	Total	44.7 Mn

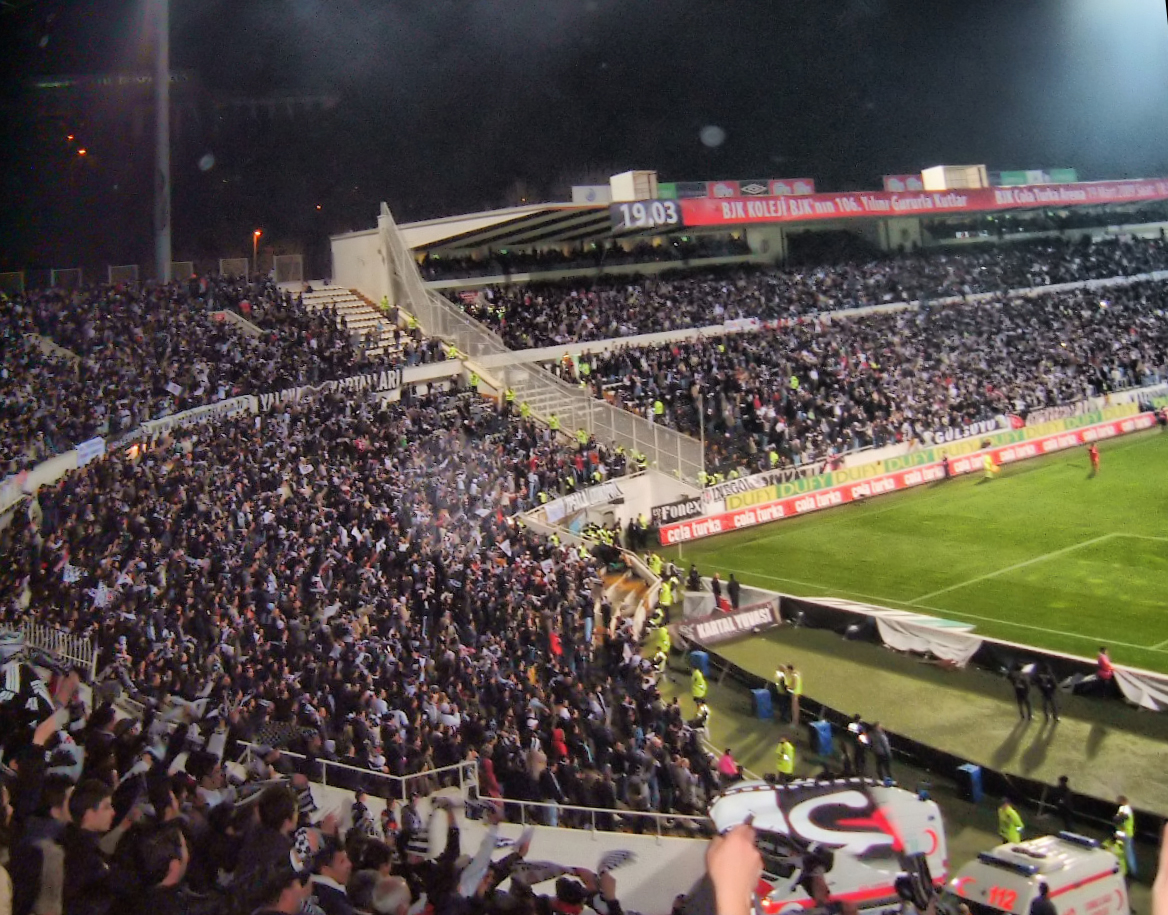
Beşiktaş fans

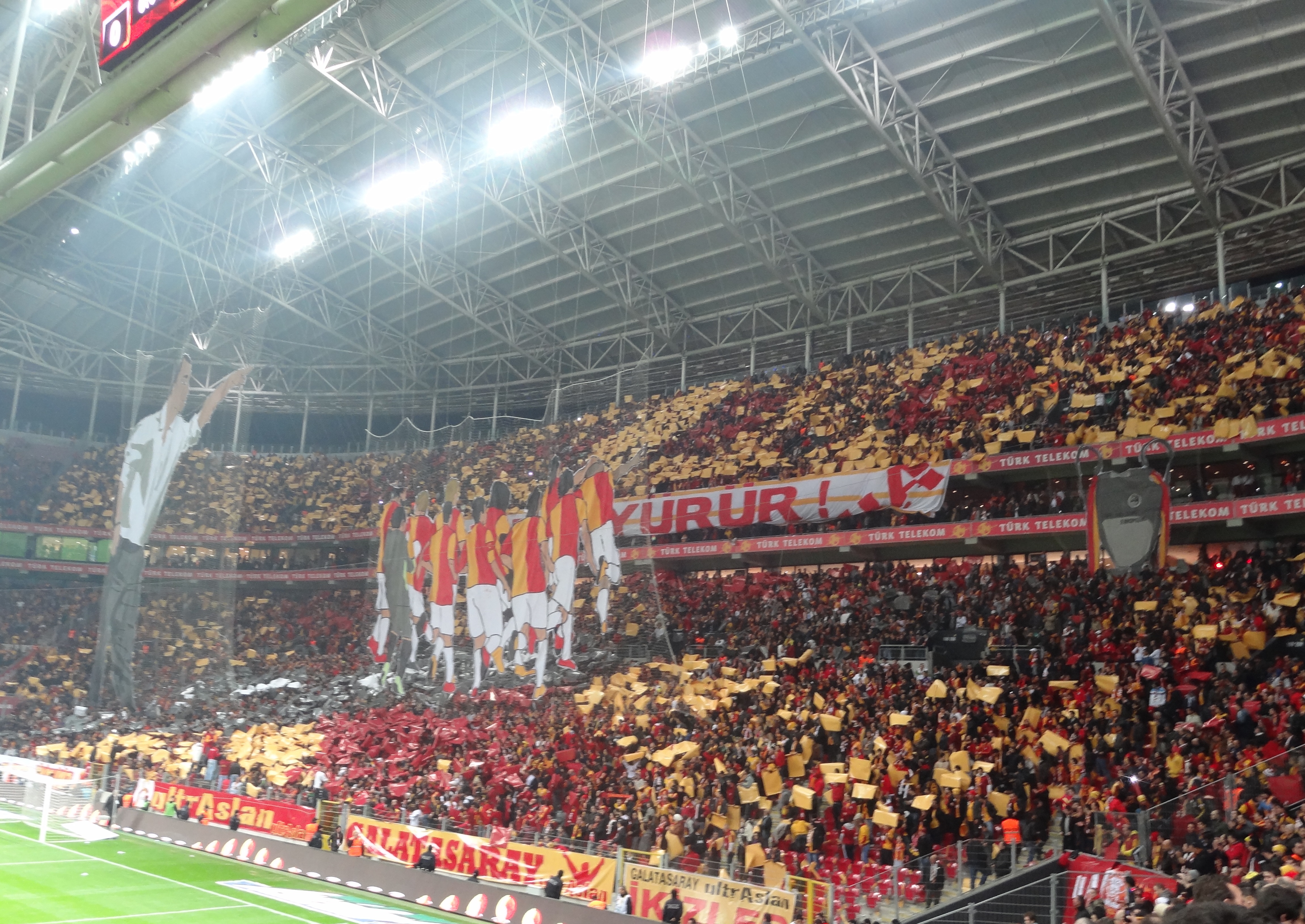
Galatasaray fans

== Highest attendance ==
Attendance Records
Rank	Attendance	Date	Game	Stadium
1	76,127	22 September 2013	Beşiktaş – Galatasaray	Atatürk Olympic Stadium
2	70,847	3 August 2024	Galatasaray – Beşiktaş	Atatürk Olympic Stadium
3	51,750	28 October 2024	Galatasaray – Beşiktaş	Rams Park
4	51,578	5 May 2019	Galatasaray – Beşiktaş	Rams Park
5	50,463	6 May 2012	Galatasaray – Beşiktaş	Rams Park
6	50,429	21 October 2023	Galatasaray – Beşiktaş	Rams Park
7	50,304	29 April 2018	Galatasaray – Beşiktaş	Rams Park
8	50,237	5 November 2022	Galatasaray – Beşiktaş	Rams Park
9	49,965	22 February 2014	Galatasaray – Beşiktaş	Rams Park
10	49,817	26 February 2012	Galatasaray – Beşiktaş	Rams Park

== Head-to-head ranking in Süper Lig ==
P.	59	60	61	62	63	64	65	66	67	68	69	70	71	72	73	74	75	76	77	78	79	80	81	82	83	84	85	86	87	88	89	90	91	92	93	94	95	96	97	98	99	00	01	02	03	04	05	06	07	08	09	10	11	12	13	14	15	16	17	18	19	20	21	22	23	24	25	26
1		1		1	1			1	1		1		1	1	1									1				1	1	1		1	1	1	1	1	1		1	1	1	1		1	1			1		1	1			1	1		1	1	1	1	1		1		1	1	1	1
2	2		2		2	2	2	2		2						2	2				2						2	2	2	2	2		2		2				2		2	2	2		2				2							2							2					
3	3	3	3	3		3	3		3	3	3							3		3			3		3	3					3			3			3	3						3		3	3	3	3	3		3			3	3	3				3	3			3			
4														4					4							4						4				4		4					4				4					4		4					4	4							4	4
5																5	5		5	5			5		5		5																								5		5															
6													6		6																									6						6												6				6		6		6		
7																																																																				
8												8																																									8															
9												9									9	9																																														
10																																																																				
11																		11				11		11																																												
12																																																																				
13																																																																13				
14																																																																				
15																																																																				
16																																																																				
17																																																																				
18																																																																				
19																																																																				
20																																																																				
21																																																																				
22																																																																				

• Total: Beşiktaş with 27 higher finishes, Galatasaray with 41 higher finishes (as of the end of the 2025–26 season).

== Statistics ==
=== Head-to-head ===
As of 7 March 2026

Tournament	Matches	Wins Beşiktaş	Draws	Wins Galatasaray	Goals Beşiktaş	Goals Galatasaray
Süper Lig	136	40	44	52	144	167
Turkish Cup	15	1	8	6	11	18
Turkish Super Cup	9	4	1	4	12	10
Total Süper Lig & Cup	160	45	53	62	167	195
Istanbul Football League	62	29	11	22	119	103
Turkish Federation Cup	4	3	0	1	4	2
Istanbul Football Cup	4	1	1	2	5	7
Turkish National Division	18	4	7	7	29	39
Spor Toto Cup	1	0	1	0	0	0
2000 Atatürk Cup	1	1	0	0	2	1
Total official matches	250	83	73	94	325	343
Friendly / Other	109	30	40	37	143	165
Total	360	116	115	129	472	501

=== Biggest wins (5+ goals) ===
Margin	Result	Date
7	Galatasaray 9–2 Beşiktaş	30 June 1940
6	Beşiktaş 0–6 Galatasaray	18 July 1997
5	Galatasaray 6–1 Beşiktaş	31 July 1925
5	Beşiktaş 5–0 Galatasaray	17 March 1933
5	Beşiktaş 5–0 Galatasaray	29 December 1940
5	Galatasaray 0–5 Beşiktaş	3 August 2024

=== Most consecutive wins ===
Games	Club	Period
7	Galatasaray	31 July 1925 – 19 April 1929
5	Beşiktaş	11 October 1931 – 20 October 1933
5	Galatasaray	27 January 2013 – 24 May 2015

=== Most consecutive draws ===
Games	Period
6	6 September 1969 – 14 March 1971
5	19 June 1982 – 2 February 1983
4	2 February 1934 – 29 June 1934
4	17 December 1951 – 9 November 1952

=== Most consecutive matches without a draw ===
Games	Period
15	17 April 1955 – 21 September 1958
11	5 March 2005 – 12 September 2009

=== Longest undefeated runs ===
Games	Club	Period
17	Galatasaray	30 March 1975 – 15 August 1979
16	Beşiktaş	6 October 1931 – 26 January 1936
14	Galatasaray	31 July 1925 – 6 October 1931
12	Galatasaray	17 October 1965 – 29 December 1968
10	Beşiktaş	4 December 1951 – 21 February 1954
10	Galatasaray	20 November 2011 – 24 May 2015

=== Highest scoring matches ===
Goals	Home	Score	Away	Date
11	Galatasaray	9–2	Beşiktaş	30 June 1940
9	Galatasaray	5–4	Beşiktaş	30 April 1949
9	Beşiktaş	5–4	Galatasaray	6 November 1955
8	Galatasaray	4–4	Beşiktaş	4 January 1935
8	Galatasaray	4–4	Beşiktaş	21 November 1937
8	Galatasaray	4–4	Beşiktaş	11 May 1940
8	Beşiktaş	4–4	Galatasaray	16 June 1940
8	Galatasaray	4–4	Beşiktaş	26 May 1968

=== Most consecutive matches without conceding a goal ===
Games	Club	Period
5	Galatasaray	9 April 1972 – 5 March 1973
4	Beşiktaş	6 October 1931 – 17 March 1933
4	Beşiktaş	4 February 1951 – 30 March 1952
4	Galatasaray	17 October 1965 – 21 September 1966
4	Galatasaray	23 October 1980 – 8 August 1981
4	Galatasaray	9 January 1985 – 24 March 1985
4	Galatasaray	2 August 1998 – 5 May 1999
4	Galatasaray	22 September 2013 – 24 May 2015

=== Most consecutive games scoring ===
Games	Club	Period
21	Beşiktaş	13 July 1934 – 12 November 1939
11	Galatasaray	6 February 1996 – 15 May 1998
10	Beşiktaş	27 December 1942 – 10 December 1944
10	Galatasaray	12 November 1976 – 15 August 1979
10	Galatasaray	5 May 1999 – 9 March 2002
10	Galatasaray	20 November 2011 – 14 December 2015

=== Most appearances ===
Player	Games	Club
Şeref Görkey	63	Beşiktaş
Hakkı Yeten	61	Beşiktaş
Rıza Çalımbay	59	Beşiktaş
Bülent Korkmaz	51	Galatasaray

=== Top scorers ===
Player	Goals	Games	Rate	Club
Hakkı Yeten	29	61	0.47	Beşiktaş
Şeref Görkey	26	63	0.41	Beşiktaş
Gündüz Kılıç	21	31	0.68	Galatasaray
Feyyaz Uçar	18	44	0.41	Beşiktaş
Metin Oktay	15	40	0.38	Galatasaray
Kemal Gülçelik	14	?	?	Beşiktaş
Şükrü Gülesin	13	25	0.52	Beşiktaş
Hakan Şükür	13	45	0.29	Galatasaray
Recep Adanır	10	?	?	Beşiktaş

=== Most goals by a player in a match ===
Goals	Player	Club	Score	Date
5	Gündüz Kılıç	Galatasaray	9–2	30 June 1940

== Played for both teams ==
Players from Beşiktaş to Galatasaray

- (Turkey) Refik Osman Top
- (Turkey) Şükrü Gülesin
- (Turkey) Recep Adanır
- (Turkey) Ahmet Berman
- (Turkey) Ali Çoban
- (Socialist Federal Republic of Yugoslavia) Mersad Kovačević
- (Turkey) Saffet Sancaklı
- (Turkey) Sergen Yalçın
- (Turkey) Ayhan Akman
- (Turkey) Gökhan Zan
- (Turkey) Serdar Özkan
- (Turkey) Burak Yılmaz
- (Turkey) Cenk Gönen
- (Netherlands) Ryan Babel
- (Turkey) Adem Büyük
- (Turkey) Günay Güvenç

Players from Galatasaray to Beşiktaş

- (Turkey) İbrahim Tusder
- (Turkey) Ali Soydan
- (Turkey) Ergun Acuner
- (Turkey) Suat Mamat
- (Turkey) Ahmet Yıldırım
- (Turkey) Emre Aşık
- (Romania) Adrian Ilie
- (Turkey) Okan Buruk
- (Turkey) Berkant Göktan
- (Turkey) Mehmet Yozgatlı
- (Cameroon) Dany Nounkeu
- (Turkey) Caner Erkin
- (Turkey) Mehmet Topal
- (Portugal) Gedson Fernandes
- (Kosovo) Milot Rashica

Managers for both teams

- (Italy) Leandro Remondini
- (Turkey) Gündüz Kılıç
- (Germany) Karl-Heinz Feldkamp
- (Romania) Mircea Lucescu
- (Turkey) Mustafa Denizli

== Süper Lig matches ==
Season	Date	Stadium	Home team	Score	Away team	Beşiktaş scorers	Galatasaray scorers
1959/60	02-12-1959	İnönü	Beşiktaş	1–0	Galatasaray	Bilge (44)	
1959/60	06-04-1960	İnönü	Galatasaray	0–1	Beşiktaş	Özataç (70)	
1960/61	01-01-1961	İnönü	Galatasaray	1–0	Beşiktaş		Altıntabak (5)
1960/61	20-03-1961	İnönü	Beşiktaş	2–0	Galatasaray	Ertan (20), Pekel (54)	
1961/62	10-12-1961	İnönü	Galatasaray	0–0	Beşiktaş		
1961/62	07-06-1962	İnönü	Beşiktaş	1–1	Galatasaray	Önüt (37)	Altıntabak (35)
1962/63	15-05-1963	İnönü	Galatasaray	1–2	Beşiktaş	Birol (8), Köstepen (38)	Metin Oktay (19)
1962/63	26-06-1963	İnönü	Beşiktaş	0–1	Galatasaray		Metin (50p)
1963/64	28-10-1963	İnönü	Galatasaray	0–0	Beşiktaş		
1963/64	22-03-1964	İnönü	Beşiktaş	2–1	Galatasaray	Özacar (65), Sanlı (89)	Metin (80p)
1964/65	29-10-1964	İnönü	Galatasaray	1–0	Beşiktaş		Doğangün (58)
1964/65	14-02-1965	İnönü	Beşiktaş	2–3	Galatasaray	Tunaoğlu (35), Ehlidil (58)	Metin (60p), Kutver (61, 70)
1965/66	17-10-1965	İnönü	Beşiktaş	0–1	Galatasaray		Metin (90)
1965/66	27-03-1966	İnönü	Galatasaray	0–0	Beşiktaş		
1966/67	09-10-1966	Ali Sami Yen	Beşiktaş	2–2	Galatasaray	Önüt (50), Tunaoğlu (61)	Doğangün (20), Elmastaşoğlu (29)
1966/67	05-03-1967	Ali Sami Yen	Galatasaray	1–1	Beşiktaş	Özacar (5p)	Elmastaşoğlu (49)
1967/68	07-01-1968	İnönü	Beşiktaş	1–1	Galatasaray	Özacar (15)	Acuner (70)
1967/68	26-05-1968	Ali Sami Yen	Galatasaray	4–4	Beşiktaş	Sanlı (24, 64), Şahin (85), Özacar (88)	Metin (35, 39), Doğangün (59), Köken (73)
1968/69	29-12-1968	Ali Sami Yen	Galatasaray	2–0	Beşiktaş		Turan (12, 61)
1968/69	11-05-1969	İnönü	Beşiktaş	0–1	Galatasaray		Köken (76)
1969/70	02-11-1969	İnönü	Galatasaray	1–1	Beşiktaş	Yayöz (17)	Özdenak (15)
1969/70	29-03-1970	Ali Sami Yen	Beşiktaş	0–0	Galatasaray		
1970/71	24-10-1970	İnönü	Beşiktaş	1–1	Galatasaray	Yayöz (87)	Suphi (18)
1970/71	14-03-1971	Ali Sami Yen	Galatasaray	1–1	Beşiktaş	Kurtar (78)	Oğuz (7)
1971/72	07-11-1971	İnönü	Beşiktaş	2–1	Galatasaray	Lindholm (31), Yayöz (49)	Özdenak (34)
1971/72	09-04-1972	Ali Sami Yen	Galatasaray	1–0	Beşiktaş		Özdenak (68)
1972/73	01-10-1972	İnönü	Galatasaray	0–0	Beşiktaş		
1972/73	04-03-1973	İnönü	Beşiktaş	0–3	Galatasaray		Temeller (22p), Akkuş (52), Özgül (58)
1973/74	04-11-1973	İnönü	Beşiktaş	2–1	Galatasaray	Ahmet (6), Şener (57)	Mehmet (3)
1973/74	31-03-1974	İnönü	Galatasaray	0–1	Beşiktaş	Vedat Okyar (60p)	
1974/75	29-09-1974	İnönü	Beşiktaş	0–0	Galatasaray		
1974/75	23-02-1975	İnönü	Galatasaray	1–2	Beşiktaş	Tezcan (65), Alayoğlu (68)	Mehmet (88)
1975/76	09-11-1975	İnönü	Galatasaray	1–0	Beşiktaş		Isıgöllü (52og)
1975/76	04-04-1976	İnönü	Beşiktaş	1–1	Galatasaray	Kurukaya (60)	Kurt (80)
1976/77	23-01-1977	İnönü	Galatasaray	2–2	Beşiktaş	Kemal (15), Akpınar (78)	Özgül (57), Özdenak (77)
1976/77	15-05-1977	İnönü	Beşiktaş	0–2	Galatasaray		Rıdvan (32), Özgül (44)
1977/78	18-12-1977	İnönü	Galatasaray	3–1	Beşiktaş	Paunovic (72p)	Özdenak (61, 86), Öner (69)
1977/78	07-05-1978	İnönü	Beşiktaş	1–1	Galatasaray	Kartal (27)	Özdenak (71)
1978/79	19-11-1978	İnönü	Beşiktaş	0–1	Galatasaray		Öner (47)
1978/79	13-05-1979	İnönü	Galatasaray	3–1	Beşiktaş	Ziya (24)	Özdenak (13), Güngör (44), Tanman (89)
1979/80	16-09-1979	İnönü	Beşiktaş	2–0	Galatasaray	Çoban (51), Ergün (81)	
1979/80	02-03-1980	İnönü	Galatasaray	1–2	Beşiktaş	Ömer (65), Ergün (79)	Aday (31)
1980/81	23-11-1980	İnönü	Beşiktaş	0–1	Galatasaray		İnal (65)
1980/81	03-05-1981	Ali Sami Yen	Galatasaray	0–0	Beşiktaş		
1981/82	19-09-1981	İnönü	Galatasaray	1–1	Beşiktaş	Süleyman (71)	Sinan (63)
1981/82	07-03-1982	İnönü	Beşiktaş	2–0	Galatasaray	Denizci (11), Necdet (83)	
1982/83	30-10-1982	Ali Sami Yen	Galatasaray	1–1	Beşiktaş	Ergün (12)	Hodžić (57)
1982/83	17-04-1983	Fenerbahçe	Beşiktaş	0–1	Galatasaray		Sinan (21)
1983/84	27-11-1983	Fenerbahçe	Beşiktaş	2–1	Galatasaray	Ziya (3), Arnautović (58)	Çetiner (15)
1983/84	29-04-1984	Ali Sami Yen	Galatasaray	0–1	Beşiktaş	Necdet (82)	
1984/85	21-10-1984	İnönü	Beşiktaş	1–3	Galatasaray	Šećerbegović (7)	Keser (27, 35), Abramczik (48)
1984/85	24-03-1985	İnönü	Galatasaray	0–0	Beşiktaş		
1985/86	08-12-1985	İnönü	Beşiktaş	0–0	Galatasaray		
1985/86	04-05-1986	İnönü	Galatasaray	1–1	Beşiktaş	Ziya (74)	Altıntaş (33)
1986/87	23-11-1986	Ali Sami Yen	Galatasaray	2–2	Beşiktaş	Metin Tekin (33), Feyyaz (56)	Tütüneker (16, 75)
1986/87	03-05-1987	Fenerbahçe	Beşiktaş	0–2	Galatasaray		Prekazi (24), Koç (86)
1987/88	01-11-1987	İnönü	Beşiktaş	2–2	Galatasaray	Feyyaz (37), Rıza (87)	Demiriz (33), Six (79)
1987/88	27-03-1988	Ali Sami Yen	Galatasaray	0–0	Beşiktaş		
1988/89	17-12-1988	Ali Sami Yen	Galatasaray	1–4	Beşiktaş	Feyyaz (14, 85, 90), Önaltı (70)	Tütüneker (5)
1988/89	04-06-1989	İnönü	Beşiktaş	0–1	Galatasaray		Tanju (28)
1989/90	07-10-1989	Ali Sami Yen	Galatasaray	0–0	Beşiktaş		
1989/90	25-02-1990	İnönü	Beşiktaş	1–0	Galatasaray	Gültiken (53)	
1990/91	24-11-1990	İnönü	Beşiktaş	1–1	Galatasaray	Feyyaz (76)	Tanju (16)
1990/91	20-04-1991	Ali Sami Yen	Galatasaray	2–3	Beşiktaş	Gültiken (33, 43), Feyyaz (73)	Tanju (5), Ulvi (18og)
1991/92	14-12-1991	Ali Sami Yen	Galatasaray	0–1	Beşiktaş	Turan (44)	
1991/92	09-05-1992	İnönü	Beşiktaş	4–3	Galatasaray	Özdilek (28, 82), Sergen (52), Gültiken (58)	Altıntaş (25p), Hamzaoğlu (35), Demiriz (46)
1992/93	05-12-1992	İnönü	Beşiktaş	1–3	Galatasaray	Feyyaz (23)	Şükür (34, 81), Stumpf (65)
1992/93	22-05-1993	Ali Sami Yen	Galatasaray	1–1	Beşiktaş	Feyyaz (18p)	Şükür (5)
1993/94	13-11-1993	İnönü	Beşiktaş	0–1	Galatasaray		Kerimoğlu (8p)
1993/94	09-04-1994	Ali Sami Yen	Galatasaray	1–1	Beşiktaş	Uzun (72)	Hamzaoğlu (33)
1994/95	02-10-1994	Ali Sami Yen	Galatasaray	3–1	Beşiktaş	Sergen (49)	Mapeza (78, 84p), Sancaklı (88)
1994/95	05-03-1995	İnönü	Beşiktaş	2–3	Galatasaray	Ertugrul (22), Sergen (70)	Şükür (3, 66), Suat (75)
1995/96	17-12-1995	Ali Sami Yen	Galatasaray	1–3	Beşiktaş	Ertugrul (16p), Özdilek (53), Sergen (62)	Talay (27)
1995/96	11-05-1996	İnönü	Beşiktaş	1–2	Galatasaray	Kuntz (87)	Tarhan (41), Şükür (72)
1996/97	15-11-1996	Ali Sami Yen	Galatasaray	2–2	Beşiktaş	Ertugrul (23, 56p)	Şükür (32, 41)
1996/97	20-04-1997	İnönü	Beşiktaş	1–1	Galatasaray	Amokachi (32)	Hagi (86p)
1997/98	21-09-1997	İnönü	Beşiktaş	2–1	Galatasaray	Özdilek (3), Amokachi (71)	Şükür (78)
1997/98	01-03-1998	Ali Sami Yen	Galatasaray	3–2	Beşiktaş	Özdilek (30, 54)	Hagi (20), Ünsal (47), Belözoğlu (79)
1998/99	16-12-1998	Ali Sami Yen	Galatasaray	2–0	Beşiktaş		Akyel (13), Belözoğlu (86)
1998/99	09-05-1999	İnönü	Beşiktaş	1–1	Galatasaray	Özdilek (75)	Buruk (4)
1999/00	12-12-1999	Ali Sami Yen	Galatasaray	1–0	Beşiktaş		Buruk (28)
1999/00	14-04-2000	İnönü	Beşiktaş	1–1	Galatasaray	Özdilek (30)	Halilagić (80og)
2000/01	21-10-2000	İnönü	Beşiktaş	3–1	Galatasaray	Nouma (13), Ahmet (85, 87)	Davala (33)
2000/01	31-03-2001	Ali Sami Yen	Galatasaray	2–0	Beşiktaş		Aykut (13), Jardel (83)
2001/02	21-10-2001	İnönü	Beşiktaş	2–2	Galatasaray	Bektaş (10), Aşık (30 o.g.)	Fleurquin (61), Erdem (77)
2001/02	09-03-2002	Ali Sami Yen	Galatasaray	1–0	Beşiktaş		Fleurquin (68)
2002/03	08-12-2002	Ali Sami Yen	Galatasaray	0–1	Beşiktaş	Üzülmez (76)	
2002/03	25-05-2003	İnönü	Beşiktaş	1–0	Galatasaray	Sergen Yalçın (90)	
2003/04	31-10-2003	İnönü	Beşiktaş	0–0	Galatasaray		
2003/04	04-04-2004	Atatürk Olympic	Galatasaray	1–2	Beşiktaş	Pancu (54p), Ilie (87p)	Üzülmez (31og)
2004/05	19-09-2004	İnönü	Beşiktaş	0–0	Galatasaray		
2004/05	05-03-2005	Ali Sami Yen	Galatasaray	1–0	Beşiktaş		Şükür (54)
2005/06	10-12-2005	Ali Sami Yen	Galatasaray	3–2	Beşiktaş	Toraman (2, 15)	Ateş (6), Ilić (54, 55)
2005/06	07-05-2006	İnönü	Beşiktaş	1–2	Galatasaray	Tümer (52)	Kabze (64, 90)
2006/07	17-09-2006	Ali Sami Yen	Galatasaray	1–0	Beşiktaş		Karan (31p)
2006/07	03-03-2007	İnönü	Beşiktaş	2–1	Galatasaray	Bobô (32), Ricardinho (84p)	Aşık (63)
2007/08	29-09-2007	Ali Sami Yen	Galatasaray	2–1	Beşiktaş	Tello (44)	Balta (23), Nonda (77p)
2007/08	02-03-2008	İnönü	Beşiktaş	1–0	Galatasaray	Nobre (56)	
2008/09	21-12-2008	Ali Sami Yen	Galatasaray	4–2	Beşiktaş	Delgado (13), Hološko (55)	Çetin (8), Baroš (16p, 53, 67p)
2008/09	24-05-2009	İnönü	Beşiktaş	2–1	Galatasaray	Topal (40 o.g.), Şimşek (59)	Kewell (49)
2009/10	12-09-2009	Ali Sami Yen	Galatasaray	3–0	Beşiktaş		Sarp (4), Baroš (65, 82)
2009/10	21-02-2010	İnönü	Beşiktaş	1–1	Galatasaray	Sivok (82)	Arda (68)
2010/11	28-11-2010	Ali Sami Yen	Galatasaray	1–2	Beşiktaş	Guti (8p), Nobre (79)	Kewell (90)
2010/11	30-04-2011	İnönü	Beşiktaş	2–0	Galatasaray	Aurélio (59), Simão (61)	
2011/12	20-11-2011	İnönü	Beşiktaş	0–0	Galatasaray		
2011/12	26-02-2012	Türk Telekom Arena	Galatasaray	3–2	Beşiktaş	Toraman (48), Kaya (73og)	Elmander (15, 90), Melo (52)
2011/12	16-04-2012	İnönü	Beşiktaş	0–2	Galatasaray		Melo (26), Aydın (79)
2011/12	06-05-2012	Türk Telekom Arena	Galatasaray	2–2	Beşiktaş	Hološko (86), Ujfaluši (88og)	Melo (9), Almeida (45og)
2012/13	26-08-2012	İnönü	Beşiktaş	3–3	Galatasaray	Melo (8og), Hološko (43, 51)	Bulut (26), Elmander (45), İnan (86p)
2012/13	27-01-2013	Türk Telekom Arena	Galatasaray	2–1	Beşiktaş	Sivok (46)	Çolak (3), Riera (45)
2013/14	22-09-2013	Atatürk Olympic	Beşiktaş	0–3	Galatasaray	Almeida (18)	0–3 awarded game Drogba (59, 73)
2013/14	22-02-2014	Türk Telekom Arena	Galatasaray	1–0	Beşiktaş		İnan (38p)
2014/15	04-01-2015	Atatürk Olympic	Beşiktaş	0–2	Galatasaray		Melo (50), Burak (90+5)
2014/15	24-05-2015	Türk Telekom Arena	Galatasaray	2–0	Beşiktaş		Öztekin (11), Sneijder (79)
2015/16	14-12-2015	Atatürk Olympic	Beşiktaş	2–1	Galatasaray	Mario Gómez (56), Töre (74)	Sneijder (54)
2015/16	08-05-2016	Türk Telekom Arena	Galatasaray	0–1	Beşiktaş	Gómez (76)	
2016/17	24-09-2016	Vodafone Park	Beşiktaş	2–2	Galatasaray	Marcelo (73), Tosun (78)	Derdiyok (8), Bruma (44)
2016/17	27-02-2017	Türk Telekom Arena	Galatasaray	0–1	Beşiktaş	Talisca (47)	
2017/18	02-12-2017	Vodafone Park	Beşiktaş	3–0	Galatasaray	Tosun (46), Tošić (70), Negredo (90)	
2017/18	29-04-2018	Türk Telekom Arena	Galatasaray	2–0	Beşiktaş		Fernando (23), Rodrigues (70)
2018/19	02-12-2018	Vodafone Park	Beşiktaş	1–0	Galatasaray	Ljajić (18p)	
2018/19	05-05-2019	Türk Telekom Arena	Galatasaray	2–0	Beşiktaş		Onyekuru (44), Fernando (54)
2019/20	27-10-2019	Vodafone Park	Beşiktaş	1–0	Galatasaray	Nayir (69)	
2019/20	15-03-2020	Türk Telekom Arena	Galatasaray	0–0	Beşiktaş		
2020/21	17-01-2021	Vodafone Park	Beşiktaş	2–0	Galatasaray	Souza (79), Nkoudou (90+1)	
2020/21	08-05-2021	Türk Telekom Arena	Galatasaray	3–1	Beşiktaş	Ghezzal (42p)	Babel (11), Falcao (45+1p), Arda (76)
2021/22	25-10-2021	Vodafone Park	Beşiktaş	2–1	Galatasaray	Larin (39, 64)	Cicâldău (35)
2021/22	14-03-2022	Nef Stadium	Galatasaray	2–1	Beşiktaş	Rıdvan (85)	Aktürkoğlu (22, 32)
2022/23	05-11-2022	Nef Stadium	Galatasaray	2–1	Beşiktaş	Tosun (28)	Icardi (18, 59)
2022/23	30-04-2023	Vodafone Park	Beşiktaş	3–1	Galatasaray	Saïss (35), Hadžiahmetović (58), Aboubakar (90+3)	Icardi (20)
2023/24	21-10-2023	Rams Park	Galatasaray	2–1	Beşiktaş	Oxlade-Chamberlain (69)	Icardi (26, 82p)
2023/24	03-03-2024	Tüpraş Stadyumu	Beşiktaş	0–1	Galatasaray	-	Al-Musrati (2og)
2024/25	28-10-2024	Rams Park	Galatasaray	2–1	Beşiktaş	Muçi (90+4)	Sánchez (13), Osimhen (67)
2024/25	29-03-2025	Tüpraş Stadyumu	Beşiktaş	2–1	Galatasaray	Silva (22), Gedson (66)	Torreira (45)
2025/26	04-10-2025	Rams Park	Galatasaray	1–1	Beşiktaş	Abraham (12)	Gündoğan (55)
2025/26	03-07-2026	Tüpraş Stadyumu	Beşiktaş	0–1	Galatasaray	-	Osimhen (39)

== Turkish Cup matches ==
Season	Date	Stadium	Home team	Score	Away team	Beşiktaş scorers	Galatasaray scorers
1965/66	19-06-1966	İnönü	Beşiktaş	0–1	Galatasaray		Turan (88)
1975/76	10-03-1976	İnönü	Beşiktaş	1–3	Galatasaray	Tezcan (10)	Gökmen (40), Engin (48), Mehmet (73)
1984/85	13-03-1985	Fenerbahçe	Galatasaray	0–0	Beşiktaş		
1984/85	20-03-1985	İnönü	Beşiktaş	0–1	Galatasaray		Abramczik (46)
1990/91	13-02-1991	İnönü	Beşiktaş	2–2	Galatasaray	Metin (84), Gültiken (116)	Uğur (18), Yusuf (98)
1992/93	24-03-1993	Ali Sami Yen	Galatasaray	1–0	Beşiktaş		Erdal (44)
1992/93	07-04-1993	İnönü	Beşiktaş	2–2	Galatasaray	Feyyaz (44), Ulvi (84)	Şükür (2), Arif (26)
1993/94	06-04-1994	Ali Sami Yen	Galatasaray	0–0	Beşiktaş	-	-
1993/94	04-05-1994	İnönü	Beşiktaş	3–2	Galatasaray	Metin (15), Madida (22), Alpay (83)	Şükür (11), Bülent (78)
1995/96	23-01-1996	Ali Sami Yen	Galatasaray	0–0	Beşiktaş	-	-
1995/96	06-02-1996	İnönü	Beşiktaş	1–2	Galatasaray	Ertugrul (45)	Arif (10, 67)
1997/98	25-03-1998	İnönü	Beşiktaş	1–1	Galatasaray	Ertuğrul (85)	Okan (61)
1997/98	08-04-1998	Ali Sami Yen	Galatasaray	1–1	Beşiktaş	Mehmet (44)	Arif (71)
1998/99	14-04-1999	Ali Sami Yen	Galatasaray	0–0	Beşiktaş	-	-
1998/99	05-05-1999	İnönü	Beşiktaş	0–2	Galatasaray	-	Ümit (52, 68)

== Turkish Super Cup matches ==
Season	Date	Stadium	Home team	Score	Away team	Beşiktaş scorers	Galatasaray scorers
1966	21-09-1966	Ankara 19 Mayıs Stadium	Beşiktaş	0–2	Galatasaray	-	Turan (10), Ayhan (13)
1982	16-06-1982	Ankara 19 Mayıs Stadium	Beşiktaş	0–2	Galatasaray	-	Sejdić (28), Hodžić (62)
1991	26-05-1991	Ankara 19 Mayıs Stadium	Beşiktaş	0–1	Galatasaray	-	Kosecki (78)
1993	14-08-1993	Ankara 19 Mayıs Stadium	Galatasaray	2–0	Beşiktaş		Mustafa (1), Şükür (64)
1994	22-05-1994	Ankara 19 Mayıs Stadium	Galatasaray	1–3	Beşiktaş	Feyyaz (17), Metin (66), Sergen (69)	Suat (2)
1998	15-05-1998	Ankara 19 Mayıs Stadium	Galatasaray	1–2	Beşiktaş	Amokachi (17), Nihat (113)	Mehmet (67)
2006	30-07-2006	Commerzbank-Arena	Galatasaray	0–1	Beşiktaş	Nobre (59)	
2016	13-08-2016	Konya BŞB	Beşiktaş	1–1	Galatasaray	Chedjou (107 o.g.)	Balta (100)
2024	03-08-2024	Ataturk Olympic Stadium	Galatasaray	0–5	Beşiktaş	Immobile (1, 81p), Svensson (53), Silva (90), Hekimoğlu (90+2)	

== See also ==
- The Intercontinental Derby
- Beşiktaş–Fenerbahçe rivalry
- Major football rivalries
- Beşiktaş J.K.
- Galatasaray S.K.
- Big Three (Turkey)
