= Şeref Görkey =

Turkish footballer and manager

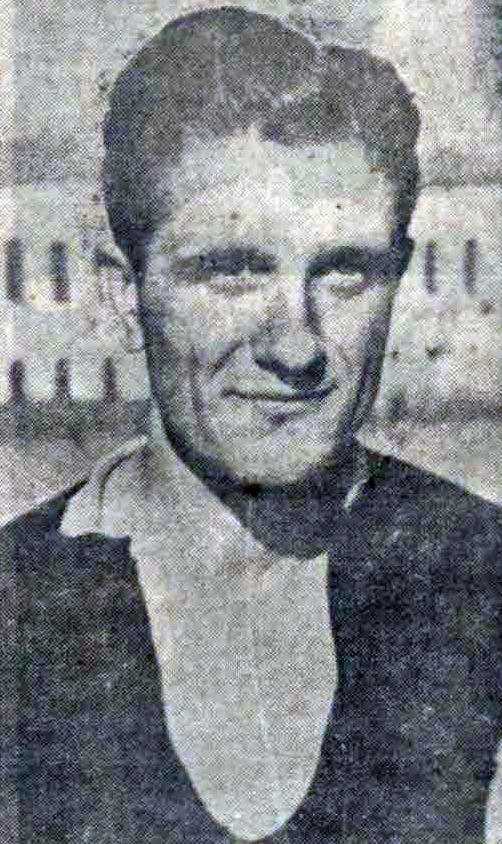
- Görkey in the 1940–41 season

Personal information
- Full name: Şeref Görkey
- Date of birth: 3 December 1914
- Place of birth: Constantinople, Ottoman Empire
- Date of death: 10 November 2004 (aged 89)
- Place of death: Istanbul, Turkey
- Position: Striker

Senior career*
Years	Team	Apps	(Gls)
1930–1950	Beşiktaş	295	(242)

International career
1936	Turkey	1	(1)

Managerial career
- 1953–1954: Adalet G.K.
- 1955–1957: Beykozspor
- 1957–1959: Turkey U-21
- 1958: Adalet G.K.
- 1959–1960: Turkey Amateurs
- 1960–1962: Turkey U-21
- 1961: Beşiktaş
- 1962: Turkey
- 1963: Vefa S.K.
- 1972: İstanbulspor
- * Club domestic league appearances and goals

Şeref Görkey (3 December 1913 – 10 November 2004) was a Turkish footballer and manager who mainly served Turkish side Beşiktaş throughout his career. Nicknamed Voleci Şeref, literally meaning "Şeref the Volley Scorer", due to his tally of scoring 99 goals of volley shots during his career, Görkey wore number 10 shirt whilst his entire spell at Beşiktaş. He was also part of Turkey's squad at the 1936 Summer Olympics, but he did not play in any matches.

== Club career ==
Görkey scored 320 goals during his career. He is one of the most scoring players in fierce rivalries of Beşiktaş, scoring 30 goals to Galatasaray and 13 goals to Fenerbahçe.

Görkey managed İstanbulspor in 1972.

== Career stats ==
=== International ===
National team	Season	Apps	Goals
Turkey	1936	1	1
Turkey	Total	1	1

International appearances and goals
#	Date	Venue	Opponent	Result	Goal	Competition
1.	12 July 1936	Istanbul, Turkey	Yugoslavia	3–3	1	Friendly

== See also ==
- List of one-club men

== Individual ==
- Beşiktaş J.K. Squads of Century (Bronze Team)
