= Ahmet Erol =

Turkish footballer

Personal information
- Date of birth: 1 January 1921
- Place of birth: Çivril, Turkey
- Date of death: 15 June 2012 (aged 91)
- Position: Defender

International career
Years	Team	Apps	(Gls)
1948–1949	Turkey	4	(0)

Ahmet Erol (1 January 1921 – 15 June 2012) was a Turkish footballer. He played in four matches for the Turkey national football team from 1948 to 1949. He was also part of Turkey's squad for the football tournament at the 1948 Summer Olympics, but he did not play in any matches.
