= Dževad Šećerbegović =

Bosnian footballer (born 1955)

Personal information
- Full name: Dževad Šećerbegović
- Date of birth: 15 July 1955 (age 71)
- Place of birth: Gornji Rahić, FPR Yugoslavia
- Height: 1.82 m (5 ft 11 1/2 in)
- Position: Left winger

Senior career*
Years	Team	Apps	(Gls)
1974–1983	Sloboda Tuzla	187	(10)
1983–1985	Beşiktaş	62	(13)
Total		249	(23)

International career
1977–1983	Yugoslavia	9	(0)
- * Club domestic league appearances and goals

Dževad Šećerbegović (born 15 July 1955) is a Bosnian retired footballer who played for SFR Yugoslavia.

== Club career ==
Born in Gornji Rahić, Brčko, Šećerbegović spent most of his football career playing for local side FK Sloboda Tuzla. At the end of his career, he moved to Turkey and signed with Beşiktaş J.K. for two seasons.

== International career ==
Šećerbegović made his debut for Yugoslavia in a January 1977 friendly match away against Colombia and has earned a total of 9 caps, scoring no goals. He also played for the Yugoslavia squad that finished fourth at the 1980 Summer Olympics in Moscow. His final international was an April 1983 friendly against France.
