= Yaşar Alpaslan =

Turkish footballer

Personal information
- Date of birth: 23 March 1914
- Date of death: 1995 (aged 80–81)

International career
Years	Team	Apps	(Gls)
- Turkey

Yaşar Alpaslan (23 March 1914 – 1995) was a Turkish footballer. He competed in the men's tournament at the 1936 Summer Olympics.
