= Şenol Birol =

Turkish footballer (1936–2022)

Personal information
- Date of birth: November 25, 1937
- Place of birth: Rize, Turkey
- Date of death: March 3, 2022 (aged 84)
- Place of death: Rize, Turkey
- Position: Forward

Youth career
- Zonguldak Kilimlispor
- Rize Güneşspor

Senior career*
| Years | Team | Apps | (Gls) |
| 1958–1959 | Sarıyer | | |
| 1959–1963 | Beşiktaş | 159 | (74) |
| 1963–1966 | Fenerbahçe | 56 | (20) |
| 1966–1967 | Karşıyaka | 24 | (2) |
| 1967–1968 | Beşiktaş | 11 | (1) |
| 1968–1969 | Rizespor | 0 | (0) |
| 1969–1970 | Karşıyaka | 4 | (0) |
| Total | | 254 | (97) |

International career
| 1960–1963 | Turkey | 8 | (3) |

Managerial career
- 1968–1969: Rizespor
- * Club domestic league appearances and goals

Şenol Birol (25 November 1937 – 3 March 2022) was a Turkish footballer who played as a forward, notably for Beşiktaş and Fenerbahçe.

== Career ==
Born in Rize, Birol started his professional career with Sarıyer S.K. and then transferred to Beşiktaş where he played four years between 1959 and 1963. Then he transferred to Fenerbahçe with his team mate Birol Pekel. He played with Fenerbahçe between 1963 and 1966. He also played with Karşıyaka S.K. (1966–67) and last he played with Beşiktaş in the 1967–68 season.

Beşiktaş fans chanted Şenol-Birol Goal in his and Pekel's honour.

== Personal life ==
Birol died on 3 March 2022, at the age of 86.

== Career statistics ==
Scores and results list Turkey's goal tally first, score column indicates score after each Birol goal.

List of international goals scored by Şenol Birol
| No. | Date | Venue | Opponent | Score | Result | Competition |
|---|---|---|---|---|---|---|
| 1 | 8 July 1960 | Ankara 19 Mayıs Stadium, Ankara, Turkey | Scotland | 4–1 | 4–2 | Friendly |
| 2 | 22 November 1962 | Ramat Gan Stadium, Ramat Gan, Israel | Israel | 1–0 | 2–0 | Friendly |
| 3 | 22 November 1962 | Ramat Gan Stadium, Ramat Gan, Israel | Israel | 2–0 | 2–0 | Friendly |

== Honours ==
Beşiktaş

- Süper Lig: 1959-60

Fenerbahçe

- Süper Lig: 1963-64, 1964-65
