= Ergun Öztuna =

Turkish footballer (1937–2023)

Ergun Öztuna (16 August 1937 – 24 May 2023) was a Turkish footballer who played as a forward for Fenerbahçe. He was known as Puskas Ergun due to his top-class technique.

Öztuna started his professional career with Karşıyaka S.K. and then transferred to Fenerbahçe where he played five years between 1956 and 61. He also played with Bursaspor, Austria Klagenfurt in Austria, Karşıyaka SK (again) and last Fenerbahçe (1964–71). He also played with Rizespor on loan from Fenerbahçe.

Öztuna scored 79 goals in 219 matches for Fenerbahçe.

Öztuna died on 24 May 2023, at the age of 85.
