= Gornji Rahić =

Gornji Rahić Горњи Рахић
- Village
- Location within Bosnia and Herzegovina
- Coordinates: 44°47′N 18°42′E
- Country: Bosnia and Herzegovina
- Entity: Brčko District

Area
  - Total: 3.36 sq mi (8.69 km^{2})

Population (2013)
  - Total: 3,403
  - Density: 1,010/sq mi (392/km^{2})
- Time zone: UTC+1 (CET)
  - Summer (DST): UTC+2 (CEST)

Gornji Rahić (Serbian Cyrillic: Горњи Рахић) is a village in the municipality of Brčko, Bosnia and Herzegovina.

== Demographics ==
According to the 2013 census, its population was 3,403.

Ethnicity in 2013
Ethnicity	Number	Percentage
Bosniaks	3,281	96.4%
Croats	2	0.1%
Serbs	2	0.1%
other/undeclared	118	3.5%
Total	3,403	100%
