= Ahmet Özacar =

Turkish footballer

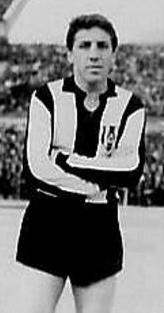
- Ahmet Özacar on 9 September 1966

Personal information
- Full name: Ahmet Refik Özacar
- Date of birth: 8 May 1937
- Place of birth: Lüleburgaz, Turkey
- Date of death: 23 October 2005 (aged 68)
- Place of death: Istanbul, Turkey
- Positions: Attacking midfielder; winger

Senior career*
Years	Team	Apps	(Gls)
1955–1971	Beşiktaş	338	(109)
Total		338	(109)

International career
1959–1962	Turkey B	2	(0)
1962	Turkey	1	(0)
- * Club domestic league appearances and goals

Ahmet Refik Özacar (8 May 1937 – 23 October 2005), known by his given nickname Küçük, literally meaning "Junior", was a Turkish international footballer.

Özacar was a one-club-man, played his entire career at Beşiktaş J.K. between 1955 and 1971.

== Achievements ==
- Süper Lig (3): 1959–60, 1965–66, 1966–67
- Turkish Super Cup (1): 1966–67
- Turkish Federation Cup (2): 1956–57, 1957–58
- Spor Toto Cup (3): 1965–66, 1968–69, 1969–70
- TSYD Cup (2): 1964–65, 1965–66

=== Individual ===
- Beşiktaş J.K. Squads of Century (Bronze Team)
