= Osvaldo Nartallo =

Argentine footballer

Personal information
- Full name: Osvaldo Darío Nartallo
- Date of birth: 7 September 1972 (age 54)
- Place of birth: General Belgrano, Argentina
- Position: Striker

Senior career*
Years	Team	Apps	(Gls)
1990–1992	San Lorenzo de Almagro	10	(0)
1992	Nueva Chicago	-	(-)
1993	Orlando Pirates	-	(-)
1993–1994	Beşiktaş JK	37	(13)
1994–1995	Petrol Ofisi Spor		
1997	Granada CF		
1998	Envigado		
1999–2000	Puebla F.C.		
2000	Toros Neza		
2001	Querétaro F.C.		
2002–2003	San Lorenzo (MdP)		
- * Club domestic league appearances and goals as of 19 October 2007

Osvaldo Darío Nartallo (born 7 September 1972 in General Belgrano, Buenos Aires) is an Argentine former footballer.

Nartallo started his career with San Lorenzo de Almagro in 1990, he only made 10 appearances for the club, and left in 1992. His next club was Nueva Chicago in the Argentine 2nd Division.

Later in 1992 he joined Orlando Pirates in South Africa and in 1993 he joined Beşiktaş JK in Turkey, he achieved moderate success at the club, scoring several goals. He later played for in Petrol Ofisi Spor in Turkey.

In 1998, he moved to Spain and played for Granada CF, along with other compatriots, Gaston Lolito and Sebastian Hernán Cattáneo.

In 1999 Nartallo moved to Mexico where he played for three clubs, Puebla Fútbol Club (1999–2000), Toros Neza (2000) and Querétaro FC (2001).

In mid-2001 he wanted to seek new horizons, he nearly signed for a club in Chile but at the last moment the deal fell through. He then returned to Argentina to play for San Lorenzo de Mar del Plata, in the regional tournaments and in the local league, where he played alongside Cristian Daguerre, Gaston Ervitti and Darius Cajaravilla. He retired in 2003.
