= Murat Alyüz =

Turkish footballer

Personal information
- Date of birth: 1920
- Place of birth: Istanbul, Ottoman Empire
- Date of death: 30 May 2006 (aged 85–86)
- Place of death: Istanbul, Turkey

International career
Years	Team	Apps	(Gls)
- Turkey

Murat Alyüz (1920 – 30 May 2006) was a Turkish footballer. He competed in the men's tournament at the 1948 Summer Olympics.
