= Ziya Doğan =

Turkish football manager

Ziyaettin Dogan (born 1 January 1961 in Gümüşhane, Turkey) is a UEFA Pro Licensed Turkish football manager.

== Career ==
Ziya Doğan has played at Beşiktaş (1979–1987), Ankaragücü (1987–1990), Kocaelispor (1990–1992) and Zeytinburnuspor (1992–1993). As a football player, he functioned as a striker. Doğan played 1 times for Turkey national football team

== Coaching career ==
Dogan coached many teams including Malatyaspor, Gençlerbirliği, Konyaspor and Trabzonspor. Malatyaspor qualified for the 2003–04 UEFA Cup under his management.

He won the Turkish Cup with Trabzonspor after a 4–0 win against Gençlerbirliği. Dogan saw his side grab famous victories against Beşiktaş J.K. including 3–0 and 1–0 wins. Trabzonspor finished the league in style as runners-up and were one of the two teams to enter the Champions League along with Fenerbahçe SK. Dogan almost qualified for the Champions League group stage but after defeating Dynamo Kyiv 2–1 away in the first leg, they lost 2–0 in the return leg, despite controlling the match, and were forced to play in the UEFA Cup.
