= Birol Pekel =

Turkish football player

Birol Pekel (18 August 1938 – 7 February 2004) was a Turkish football player of rivals Beşiktaş J.K. and Fenerbahçe. He played as a forward.

== Biography ==
Pekel was born in 1938 in Kadıköy, Istanbul. He started his professional career with Beylerbeyi S.K. and then transferred to Beşiktaş J.K. where he played four years between 1959 and 1963. Then he transferred to Fenerbahçe S.K. with his teammate Şenol Birol. He played with Fenerbahçe between 1963 and 1968 and scored 24 goals in 154 matches.

He played 9 matches for the national team.

He is famous about Şenol-Birol Goal slogan.

He died on 7 February 2004 in Kadıköy, Istanbul.
