= Recep Adanır =

Turkish footballer (1929–2017)

Personal information
- Full name: Recep Adanır
- Date of birth: 3 May 1929
- Place of birth: Ankara, Turkey
- Date of death: 20 May 2017 (aged 88)
- Position: Midfielder

Senior career*
Years	Team	Apps	(Gls)
1951–1959	Beşiktaş		
1959–1961	Kasımpaşa		
1961–1962	Galatasaray		

International career
1951–1962	Turkey	10	(2)

Managerial career
- 1963–1964: Beşiktaş
- * Club domestic league appearances and goals

Recep Adanır (3 May 1929 – 20 May 2017) was a Turkish professional footballer who played most of his career with Beşiktaş, the club he managed following his retirement. He also played for Ankaragücü, Kasımpaşa, Galatasaray and Karagümrük. Adnıir died on 20 May 2017, aged 88.

== International career ==
Adanır made 10 appearances for the senior Turkey national football team.

== Individual ==
- Beşiktaş J.K. Squads of Century (Silver Team)
