= Tuğrul Şener =

Turkish footballer (born 1952)

Tuğrul Şener (born May 19, 1952, Yalova) is a Turkish former national football player. He played for Beşiktaş and Mersin İdman Yurdu for many years. He is considered one of the club's legendary footballers, particularly due to his achievements with Beşiktaş. Tuğrul Şener is the son of the late Ali Şener, one of the founders and former presidents of Yalovaspor.

On July 8, 2013, a statue was erected in his hometown Yalova by decision of the Municipality of Yalova.

== Football career ==
=== Club career ===
After playing football for the first time in his neighborhood, he joined the youth academy of Esnafspor at the age of 12 or 13. He then began playing for Yalovaspor, a club his father co-founded, at the age of 16 or 17. After playing there for two seasons, he was transferred to Bandırmaspor in the 1970-71 season. He had two very successful seasons with Bandırmaspor, competing in the 1st League, finishing second twice in the 1969-70 Turkish 2nd Football League and relegating to the Süper Lig.

His performances there earned him a place on the transfer lists of several Super League teams, and as a result, he was transferred to Beşiktaş, one of the established Super League teams, at the beginning of the 1971-72 season.

Tuğrul Şener, who played for this strong Second League team for two seasons and attracted the attention of Beşiktaş executives, was transferred to the Beşiktaş at the age of 20 and played for Beşiktaş for seven seasons. Having won two caps for the senior national team (matches against Iran and Pakistan) and one cap for the national team (match against England), Tuğrul Şener spent a year on loan in Mersin after a successful career with Beşiktaş.

Tuğrul Şener then transferred to İskenderunspor and signed with Kocaelispor in the 1979-80 season. He joined Yalovaspor, his amateur club, in the 1980-81 season. Şener made significant contributions to the Green-Red team, which won the championship by defeating Levent (2-1) that same season. However, he retired from active football. In recent years, Tuğrul Şener has held various positions at Yalovaspor and currently runs a coffeehouse in Yalova.

=== National Team Career ===
"Tuğrul Şener" has been called up to the national team three times and has worn the national jersey three times: once for the Turkey U-21 and twice for the Turkey. He made his debut for the junior national team on May 11, 1974, in a match against the England junior national team. He made his senior national team debut on January 18, 1974, in a match against the Pakistan national team.

He was part of the senior national team's squad that participated in the fifth RCD Cup tournament held in Karachi, Pakistan in 1974, and with his team won this tournament.

=== National team statistics ===
No.	Date	National Team	Number of Matches	Number of Goals
1st	1974	Turkey U-21	1	0
2nd	1974	Turkey	2	0
Total			3	0

== Honours ==
=== Club team achievements ===
Beşiktaş

- Turkish Cup: 1975
- Prime Minister's Cup: 1974
- Presidential Cup: 1974

=== National team ===
Turkey national team
