= Şaban Kartal =

Turkish football coach and former player

Personal information
- Date of birth: 1 July 1952
- Place of birth: Veles, SR Macedonia, Yugoslavia
- Date of death: 7 September 1998
- Place of death: Bakırköy, Istanbul, Turkey
- Position: Left wing

Youth career
- İstanbul Küçükayasofya

Senior career*
Years	Team	Apps	(Gls)
1971-1972	Kasımpaşa		
1972-1973	İstanbulspor	27	(3)
1973-1976	Zonguldak Kömürspor	70	(17)
1976–1982	Beşiktaş	134	(17)
1982–1984	İskenderunspor		
1984–1985	Süleymaniye Sirkecispor		

International career
1975	Turkey U-21	2	(0)
- * Club domestic league appearances and goals

Şaban Kartal (1 July 1952 – 7 September 1998) was a Yugoslav-born Turkish former football player. His successful performance in Zonguldak Kömürspor resulted in his transfer to Beşiktaş. He won 1981–82 1.Lig title in Beşiktaş.

On September 7, 1998, he committed suicide in his house in Ataköy, Bakırköy

== Honours ==
Beşiktaş

- Süper Lig: 1981-82
