= Necdet Ergün =

Turkish football coach and former player

Personal information
- Date of birth: 5 May 1954 (age 72)
- Place of birth: Sivas, Turkey
- Position: Forward

Youth career
- ?-1975: Üsküdar Anadolu

Senior career*
Years	Team	Apps	(Gls)
1975-1977	Boluspor	55	(5)
1977-1979	Trabzonspor	44	(6)
1979–1986	Beşiktaş	186	(48)
Total		285	(59)

International career
1977–1984	Turkey	14	(0)

Managerial career
- 2005-2008: Beşiktaş Özkaynak
- 2008–2009: Beşiktaş (assistant)
- 2009–2010: Sarıyer (assistant)
- * Club domestic league appearances and goals

Necdet Ergün (born 5 May 1954) is a Turkish football coach and former player. He played in Süper Lig clubs Beşiktaş and Trabzonspor. He won several cups is both club .

== Honours ==
Trabzonspor

- Süper Lig: 1977-78
- Prime Minister's Cup: 1976
- Presidential Cup : 1978, 1979

Beşiktaş

- Süper Lig: 1981-82, 1985-86
- Presidential Cup : 1986
