= Güven Önüt =

Turkish footballer (1940–2003)

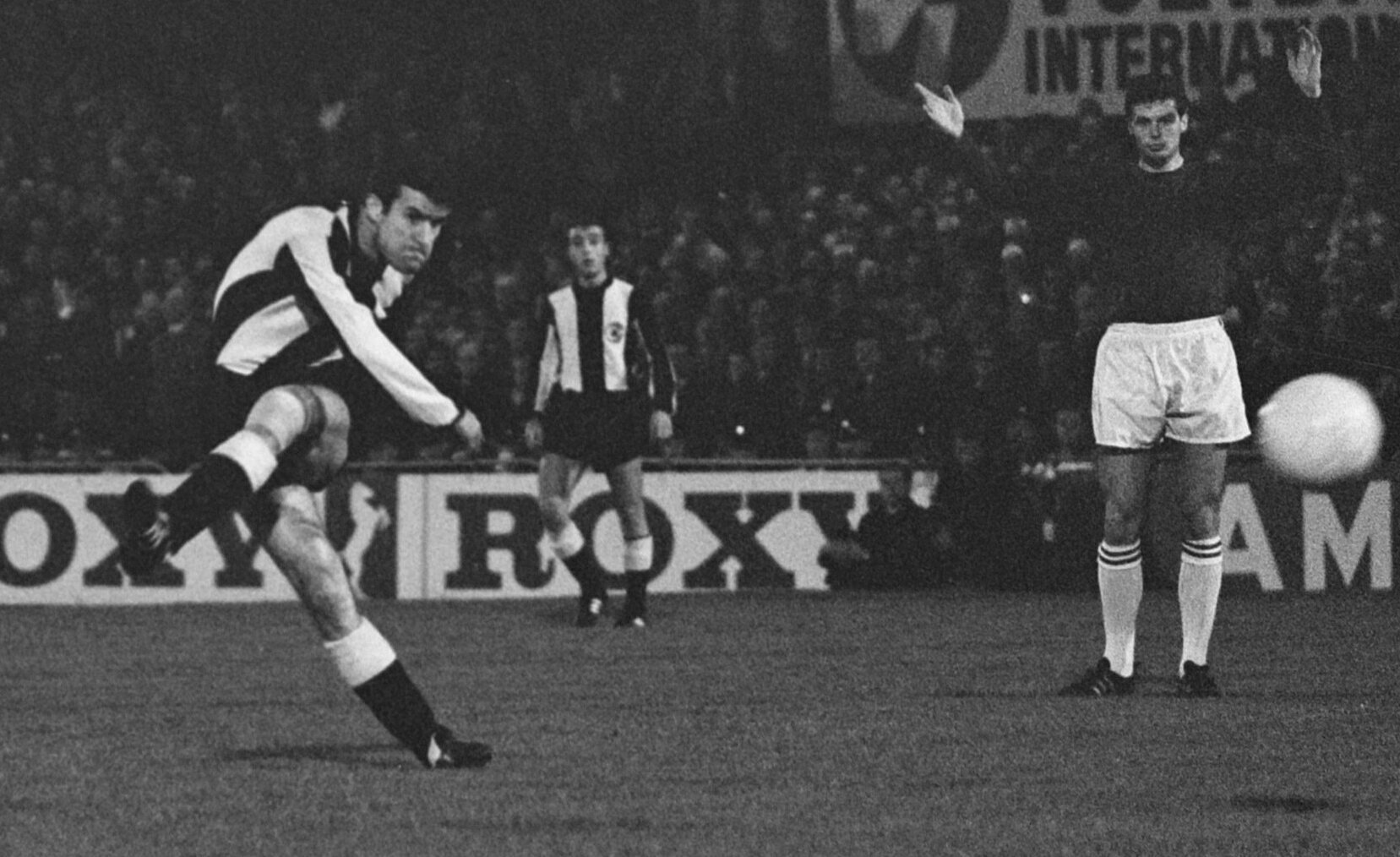

Personal information
- Full name: Güven Önüt
- Date of birth: 10 February 1940
- Place of birth: Aydın, Turkey
- Date of death: 24 February 2003 (aged 63)
- Position: Forward

Youth career
- Aydınspor

Senior career*
Years	Team	Apps	(Gls)
1959–1960	İzmirspor	29	(15)
1960–1969	Beşiktaş	133	(66)
- Trabzonspor
- Orduspor

International career
1963	Turkey U-21	1	(0)
1965	Turkey	2	(0)
- * Club domestic league appearances and goals

Güven Önüt (10 February 1940 - 24 February 2003) was a Turkish international footballer. A forward during his playing days, Önüt finished top scorer of the 1963–64 1.Lig with 19 goals. He most notably played for Beşiktaş from 1960 to 1969, scoring 62 goals in 133 matches for the club. The club transferred him from İzmirspor in 1960 after he scored a hat-trick against them, beating out Fenerbahçe and Galatasaray for his signature. He also played Trabzonspor and Orduspor. Önüt died on 24 February 2003 after suffering a heart attack. He was interred in Kazlıçeşme, Zeytinburnu.

== Honours ==
=== Beşiktaş ===
- Süper Lig: 1965–66, 1966–67

=== Individual ===
- Süper Lig top scorers: 1963-64
- Beşiktaş J.K. Squads of Century (Bronze Team)
