= Fani Madida =

South African soccer player

Personal information
- Full name: Fani Madida
- Date of birth: 7 December 1966 (age 59)
- Place of birth: Newcastle, South Africa
- Positions: Midfielder; forward

Youth career
- 1985–1986: Madadeni Santos

Senior career*
Years	Team	Apps	(Gls)
1987–1992	Kaizer Chiefs	107	(58)
1992–1995	Beşiktaş	75	(16)
1995–1996	Antalyaspor	32	(12)
1996–1997	Bursaspor	31	(6)
1997–1998	Antalyaspor	19	(2)
1998	Bursaspor	2	(0)
1998–2000	Hellenic		

International career
1992–1996	South Africa	11	(0)
- * Club domestic league appearances and goals

Fani Madida (born 7 December 1966) is a South African former professional soccer player who played as a midfielder or forward in South Africa for Giant Blackpool, Kaizer Chiefs and Hellenic and in Turkey for Beşiktaş, Antalyaspor and Bursaspor.

== International career ==
Madida made his debut for the South Africa national team on 7 July 1992 in a 1–0 win over Cameroon and played his last match on 18 September 1996 in a 2–0 win over Australia coming on for Mark Williams in the 74th minute.
