= Şükrü Gülesin =

Turkish footballer

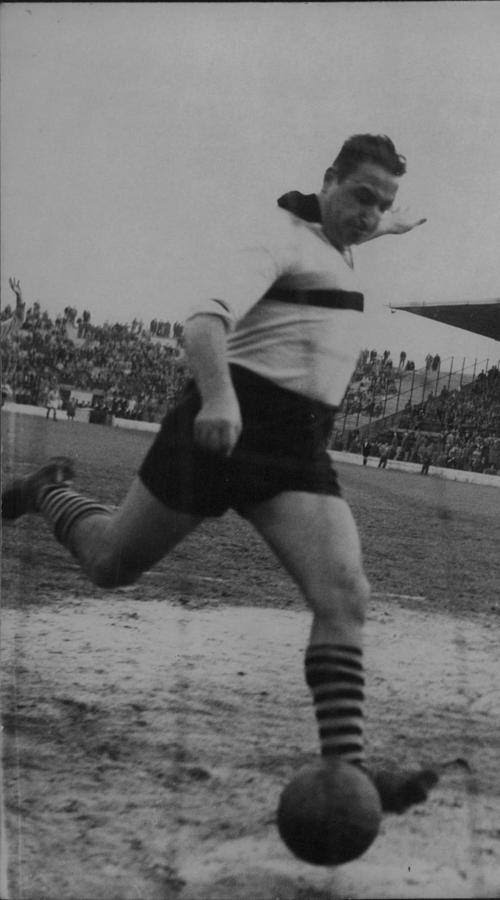

Personal information
- Full name: Şükrü Mustafa Gülesin
- Date of birth: 14 September 1922
- Place of birth: Istanbul, Ottoman Empire
- Date of death: 10 July 1977 (aged 54)
- Place of death: Istanbul, Turkey
- Height: 1.91 m (6 ft 3 in)
- Position: Striker

Youth career
- Kınalıadaspor
- Beyoğluspor

Senior career*
Years	Team	Apps	(Gls)
1940–1944	Beşiktaş	87	(70)
1944–1945	Ankaragücü	?	(?)
1945–1950	Beşiktaş	87	(76)
1950–1951	Palermo	28	(13)
1951–1952	Lazio	29	(16)
1952–1953	Palermo	22	(7)
1953–1955	Galatasaray	40	(16)

International career
1948–1951	Turkey	11	(4)

Managerial career
- 1964–1965: İzmirspor
- 1968: Feriköy
- * Club domestic league appearances and goals

Şükrü Mustafa Gülesin (14 September 1922 – 10 July 1977) was a Turkish football player and sports journalist. Almost two meters tall, he was a strong and quick striker, as well as a free kick and penalty specialist, and played for Beşiktaş, Palermo, and Lazio throughout his career. He scored a total of 226 goals in his entire career, of which 32 came directly from corner kicks (without an assist), more than any other footballer in history. He also played for Turkey at the 1948 Summer Olympics.

He died in 1977 of heart failure.

== Individual ==
- Beşiktaş J.K. Squads of Century (Golden Team)
