= Vedat Okyar =

Turkish footballer

Personal information
- Date of birth: August 1945
- Place of birth: Bursa, Turkey
- Date of death: 20 July 2009 (age 64)
- Place of death: Istanbul, Turkey
- Position: Midfielder

Youth career
- Yücespor
- Adaletspor

Senior career*
Years	Team	Apps	(Gls)
1963–1968	Bursaspor		
1968–1976	Beşiktaş	253	(21)
1976–1977	Diyarbakırspor		
1977–1980	Karagümrük		

International career
1969–1971	Turkey	33	(0)
- * Club domestic league appearances and goals

Vedat Okyar (August 1945 – 20 July 2009) was a Turkish international footballer who later became a sports journalist.

== Early life ==
Vedat Okyar was born in Bursa August 1945. He played amateur football for Yücespor and Adaletspor before becoming a professional in 1965.

== Career ==
=== Football career ===
Okyar played professionally as a midfielder for Bursaspor, Beşiktaş, Diyarbakırspor and Karagümrük. He was club captain of Beşiktaş between 1975 and 1976, and he also earned thirty-three caps for the Turkey national team.

=== Journalism career ===
After retiring as a professional footballer at age 42, Okyar became a sports journalist.

== Death ==
Okyar died of colorectal cancer in an Istanbul hospital on 20 July 2009, aged 64. Following the religious funeral service at Teşvikiye Mosque, he was laid to rest at the Zincirlikuyu Cemetery.

== Individual ==
- Beşiktaş J.K. Squads of Century (Silver Team)
