= Zeki Önatlı =

Turkish footballer and coach

Personal information
- Full name: Zeki Önatı
- Date of birth: 30 October 1968 (age 58)
- Place of birth: Manisa, Turkey
- Height: 1.80 m (5 ft 11 in)
- Position: Midfielder

Youth career
- 1979–1985: Bursaspor
- 1985–1987: Bergamaspor

Senior career*
Years	Team	Apps	(Gls)
1987–1993	Beşiktaş	45	(2)
1993–1999	Kocaelispor	146	(2)
1999–2003	İstanbulspor	91	(0)

International career
1985–1986	Turkey U18	10	(2)
1987–1989	Turkey U21	11	(0)
1988–1989	Turkey	5	(0)

Managerial career
- 2004–2005: Rizespor (Asst. Manager)
- 2005–2007: Beşiktaş (Asst. Manager)
- * Club domestic league appearances and goals

Zeki Önatlı (born 30 October 1967) is a former Turkish footballer and a current coach.

== Career ==
=== Player ===
Önatlı began playing football at Bursaspor where he spent 6 seasons at the youth level. He then joined Bergamaspor, a local team located in the western city of İzmir, where he spent 2 years, before joining Beşiktaş in 1987, in which he played for 6 seasons and won numerous trophies. In Beşiktaş and Kocaelispor years, he played also at European Cups, making 1 appearance in the UEFA Champions League once in 1992-93 season and Cup Winners' Cup twice in 1997-97 season.

Önatlı played in Turkey national football team in different levels, served the outfit in total of 26 matches, scoring twice at U-18 level.

=== Coaching ===
Zeki Önatlı started his coaching career in Black Sea Region team Çaykur Rizespor along with former team fellow Rıza Çalımbay in 2004, duo joined Beşiktaş a season later in 2005 with Gökhan Keskin, another former team friend, forming the coaching structure. Following the resignation of Çalımbay in week 9 of 2005-06 season, Önatlı remained his job also under management of Jean Tigana until 2007.

== Honours ==
- Beşiktaş
  - Turkish League: 3 (1989–90, 1990–91, 1991–92, 1994–95)
  - Turkish Cup: 2 (1988–89, 1989–90)
  - Presidential Cup: 2 (1988–89, 1991–92)
  - Chancellor Cup: 1 (1987–88)
  - TSYD Cup: 3 (1988, 1990, 1991)
- Kocaelispor
  - Turkish Cup: 1 (1996–97)
