= Spor Toto Cup =

Association football competition in Turkey

- Founded: 1964
- First season: 1964–65
- Folded: 1971
- Country: Turkey
- Confederation: UEFA
- Divisions: 1
- Number of clubs: 8
- Most championships: Beşiktaş (3 titles)

The Spor Toto Cup was a league cup in Turkey, organized by the Turkish Football Federation. The competition ran from 1964 to 1971.

== Champions ==
Year	Winners	Runners-up
1965	PTT	Beşiktaş
1966	Beşiktaş	Altay
1967	Fenerbahçe	Beşiktaş
1969	Beşiktaş	İstanbulspor
1970	Beşiktaş	Göztepe
1971	İstanbulspor	Bursaspor

== Performance by club ==
Club	Titles	Years won
Beşiktaş	3	1966, 1969, 1970
PTT	1	1965
Fenerbahçe	1	1967
İstanbulspor	1	1971

== 2012 Spor Toto Cup ==
In 2012, a separate Spor Toto Cup was held between 14 April 2012 and 17 May 2012, and was won by Gaziantepspor. During the 2011–12 Süper Lig season, the TFF introduced a playoff system (Süper Final) for the top 8 teams. To keep the remaining teams active and prevent a long period of inactivity, the Spor Toto Cup was organized specifically for teams that finished between 9th and 18th place, provided they were not relegated or opted out.
