= 1963–64 1.Lig =

6th season of top-tier Turkish football

1.Lig
- Season: 1963–64
- Champions: Fenerbahçe; 3rd title
- Relegated: Karşıyaka; Beyoğluspor; Kasımpaşa
- European Cup: Fenerbahçe
- Cup Winners' Cup: Galatasaray
- Inter-Cities Fairs Cup: Göztepe
- Balkans Cup: Beşiktaş
- Matches: 306
- Goals: 631 (2.06 per match)
- Top goalscorer: Güven Önüt (19 goals)

The 1963–64 1.Lig was the sixth season of professional football in Turkey. The league was re-branded as the 1.Lig following the creation of a second division known as the 2.Lig. Fenerbahçe won their third title, becoming the first club to do so. Güven Önüt, forward for Beşiktaş, finished top scorer of the league with 19 goals. He was the first player in club history to finish top scorer.

== Overview ==
Fenerbahçe won their third top-flight title and Beşiktaş finished runners-up for the second time. Galatasaray rounded out the top three. Fenerbahçe qualified for the 1964–65 European Cup and Beşiktaş qualified for the Balkans Cup. Because Galatasaray had already qualified for the European Cup Winners' Cup, Göztepe took their place at the Inter–Cities Fairs Cup. No clues were promoted, while Karşıyaka, Beyoğluspor and Kasımpaşa were relegated.

The Turkish Football Federation claimed that the result of the Karşıyaka and Kasımpaşa match, which originally finished as a 4–0 win for Karşıyaka, was fixed beforehand. As a result, the TFF changed the win to a 0–3 loss for Karşıyaka. The club was penalized 3 points. The change dropped Karşiyaka into the relegation zone, and they were relegated to the 2.Lig. Karşıyaka challenged the decision, and took the TFF to civil court. Two years later, the civil court overturned the TFF's ruling, and Karşıyaka were allowed to join the 1.Lig again in 1966–67.

== Final league table ==
Pos	Team	Pld	W	D	L	GF	GA	GR	Pts	Qualification or relegation
1	Fenerbahçe (C)	34	21	11	2	55	14	3.929	53	Qualification to European Cup preliminary round
2	Beşiktaş	34	22	8	4	57	19	3.000	52	Invitation to Balkans Cup
3	Galatasaray	34	16	10	8	49	27	1.815	42	Qualification to Cup Winners' Cup first round
4	MKE Ankaragücü	34	17	8	9	52	38	1.368	42	
5	Göztepe	34	14	12	8	39	31	1.258	40	Invitation to Inter-Cities Fairs Cup first round
6	İstanbulspor	34	13	10	11	42	36	1.167	36	
7	Altay	34	9	15	10	31	31	1.000	33	
8	Feriköy	34	11	11	12	29	30	0.967	33	
9	Gençlerbirliği	34	9	15	10	28	38	0.737	33	
10	Ankara Demirspor	34	11	9	14	43	37	1.162	31	
11	PTT	34	8	15	11	25	31	0.806	31	
12	Altınordu	34	9	12	13	28	38	0.737	30	
13	İzmirspor	34	8	12	14	28	35	0.800	28	
14	Hacettepe	34	9	10	15	26	42	0.619	28	
15	Beykoz	34	8	11	15	25	33	0.758	27	
16	Karşıyaka (R)	34	11	6	17	32	50	0.640	28	Relegation to Turkish Second Football League
17	Beyoğluspor (R)	34	5	14	15	26	40	0.650	24	Relegation to Turkish Second Football League
18	Kasımpaşa (R)	34	6	9	19	16	61	0.262	21	Relegation to Turkish Second Football League

Rules for classification: Tiebreaker is the goal ratio (average of goals scored to goals allowed)
(C) Champions; (R) Relegated

== Results ==
Home \ Away	ALT	ATO	AND	AGÜ	BJK	BYK	BEY	FNB	FER	GAL	GEN	GÖZ	HAC	İST	İZM	KSK	KAS	PTT
Altay		2–1	3–2	1–1	0–0	1–0	2–2	0–3	2–0	1–1	0–0	2–0	0–0	0–0	0–0	4–1	4–0	1–0
Altınordu	2–0		0–0	2–3	0–1	1–1	2–2	2–1	3–1	0–3	0–0	0–0	2–1	0–1	2–1	3–1	3–1	0–0
Ankara Demirspor	1–0	2–1		0–1	1–3	0–0	0–0	0–1	0–1	2–0	3–1	3–0	1–1	1–2	2–1	7–0	5–1	1–0
Ankaragücü	1–0	1–0	2–2		1–2	2–1	4–1	0–0	0–2	1–2	1–0	1–2	2–1	2–1	3–1	2–0	3–0	3–1
Beşiktaş	2–0	2–0	0–0	0–0		2–0	2–1	0–1	2–1	2–1	1–1	2–1	2–0	2–0	2–0	4–0	4–0	0–0
Beykoz	0–1	2–0	2–0	1–1	0–2		2–0	0–2	0–0	0–1	1–1	2–1	0–1	1–1	1–1	1–2	1–0	0–0
Beyoğlu	1–1	0–0	0–0	2–1	2–3	0–1		0–2	3–1	2–2	0–1	2–3	2–1	1–1	1–0	1–0	0–0	1–1
Fenerbahçe	0–0	4–0	5–2	2–0	0–0	4–1	2–0		1–1	0–0	1–1	3–2	4–0	1–0	0–0	2–0	3–0	2–0
Feriköy	0–0	0–0	0–0	0–2	2–1	2–0	1–0	0–1		0–1	1–2	0–0	0–0	2–1	1–1	2–0	3–1	0–0
Galatasaray	3–0	0–1	1–0	2–4	0–0	3–2	1–0	0–0	2–1		1–2	0–0	0–0	3–0	4–0	4–1	0–0	1–0
Gençlerbirliği	2–1	0–0	1–4	1–1	0–4	1–1	0–0	0–0	1–0	1–0		1–3	2–0	0–3	1–0	2–0	1–1	0–0
Göztepe	1–0	4–1	2–0	2–1	3–2	0–0	3–2	1–1	0–0	0–1	0–0		1–0	0–1	1–0	1–0	0–1	2–0
Hacettepe	1–1	0–0	1–0	1–3	1–2	0–2	1–0	1–4	0–0	2–1	1–0	2–2		4–2	0–3	0–1	1–0	2–0
İstanbulspor	1–0	1–1	3–1	0–0	0–3	0–0	1–0	0–1	2–1	0–2	2–2	1–2	2–0		2–0	1–2	3–0	0–0
İzmirspor	1–0	2–0	0–0	3–1	1–0	0–2	0–0	1–2	3–0	2–1	1–1	0–0	1–1	1–1		0–1	0–0	0–1
Karşıyaka	2–2	0–1	2–0	2–3	0–1	1–0	1–0	0–0	0–1	1–1	2–0	1–1	2–0	1–1	2–2		4–0	0–1
Kasımpaşa	1–1	1–0	0–2	0–0	0–2	1–0	0–0	0–2	1–3	0–5	2–1	0–0	0–2	1–5	2–1	1–0		1–1
PTT	1–1	0–0	2–1	3–1	2–2	1–0	0–0	2–0	0–2	2–2	3–1	1–1	0–0	1–3	0–1	1–2	1–0	

Source: TFF, Mackolik
Legend: Blue = home team win; Yellow = draw; Red = away team win.
