= The Intercontinental Derby (football) =

Turkish football match

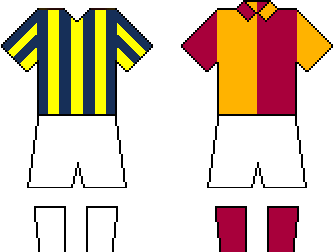
- Other names: Ezelî Rekabet (The Eternal Rivalry); Dostluk Derbisi (The Derby of Friendship) (formerly)
- Location: Istanbul, Turkey
- Teams: Fenerbahçe; Galatasaray
- First meeting: Galatasaray 2–0 Fenerbahçe; 17 January 1909; 117 years ago
- Latest meeting: Galatasaray 2–1 Fenerbahçe; Süper Lig (26 October 2026)
- Next meeting: TBD
- Stadiums: Ali Sami Yen Spor Kompleksi; Şükrü Saracoğlu Stadium

Statistics
- Total meetings: 407
- Most wins: Fenerbahçe (150)
- Most player appearances: Turgay Şeren (55)
- Top scorer: Zeki Rıza Sporel (27)
- All-time series: Fenerbahçe: 150; Drawn: 125; Galatasaray: 132
- Largest victory: Fenerbahçe 6–0 Galatasaray (6 November 2002); Fenerbahçe 0–7 Galatasaray (12 February 1911)
- Locations of the teams' ground in Istanbul

The Intercontinental Derby (Turkish: Kıtalararası Derbi) is any football (Note: See The Intercontinental Derby (basketball) for the same rivalry in basketball) match between rivals Fenerbahçe SK and Galatasaray SK. The fixture is widely regarded as the biggest football match in Turkey because of the success both clubs have had in Turkish football, the intensity of the matches, and the immense rivalry between the two teams. The fixture has been in existence for more than a century and has developed into one of the greatest, most intense and often bitter derbies in the world, traditionally attracting very large attendances and nearly equal support for both teams throughout the country. The derby is known as "intercontinental" because Fenerbahçe and Galatasaray are two of the major Turkish teams from the Asian and the European parts of Istanbul respectively.

== History ==
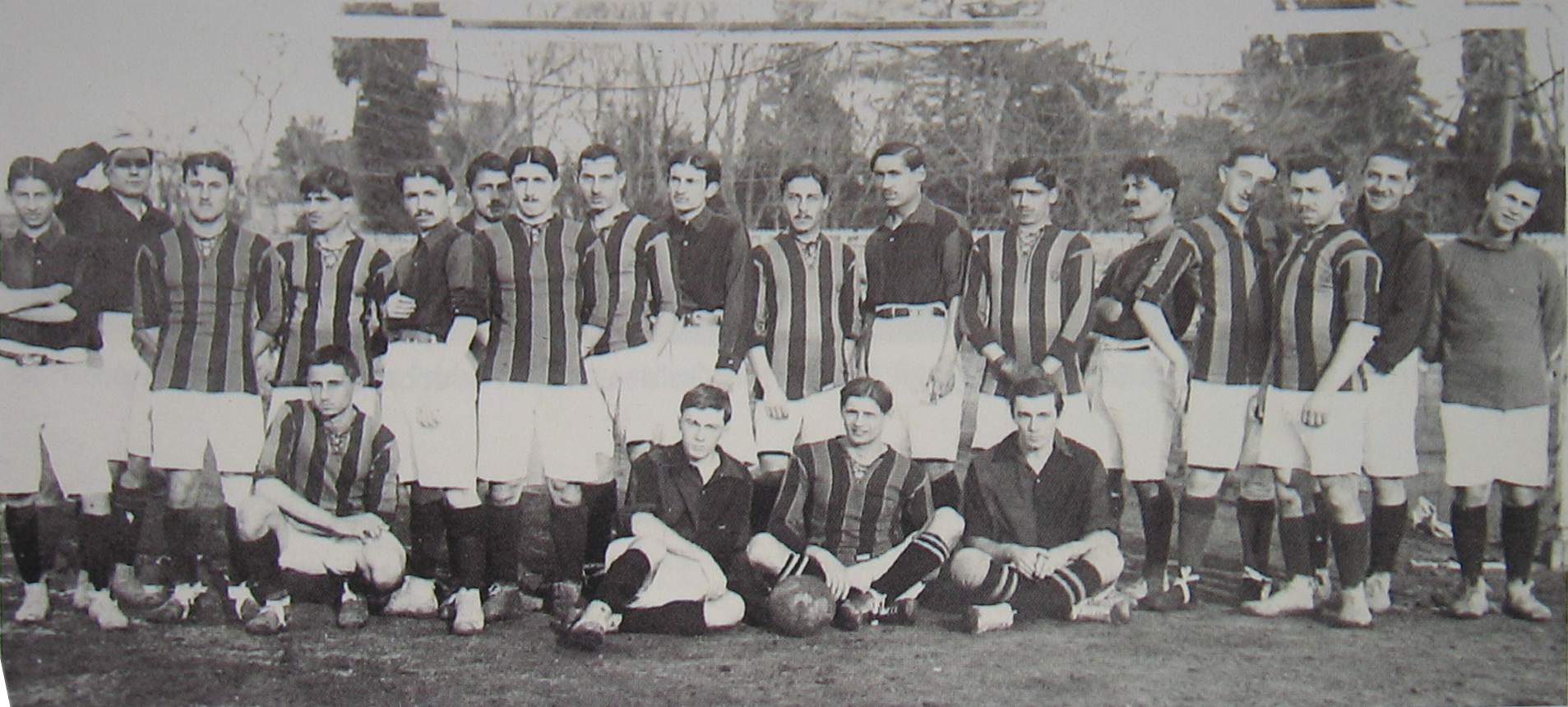
Fenerbahçe SK and Galatasaray SK 1913–14.

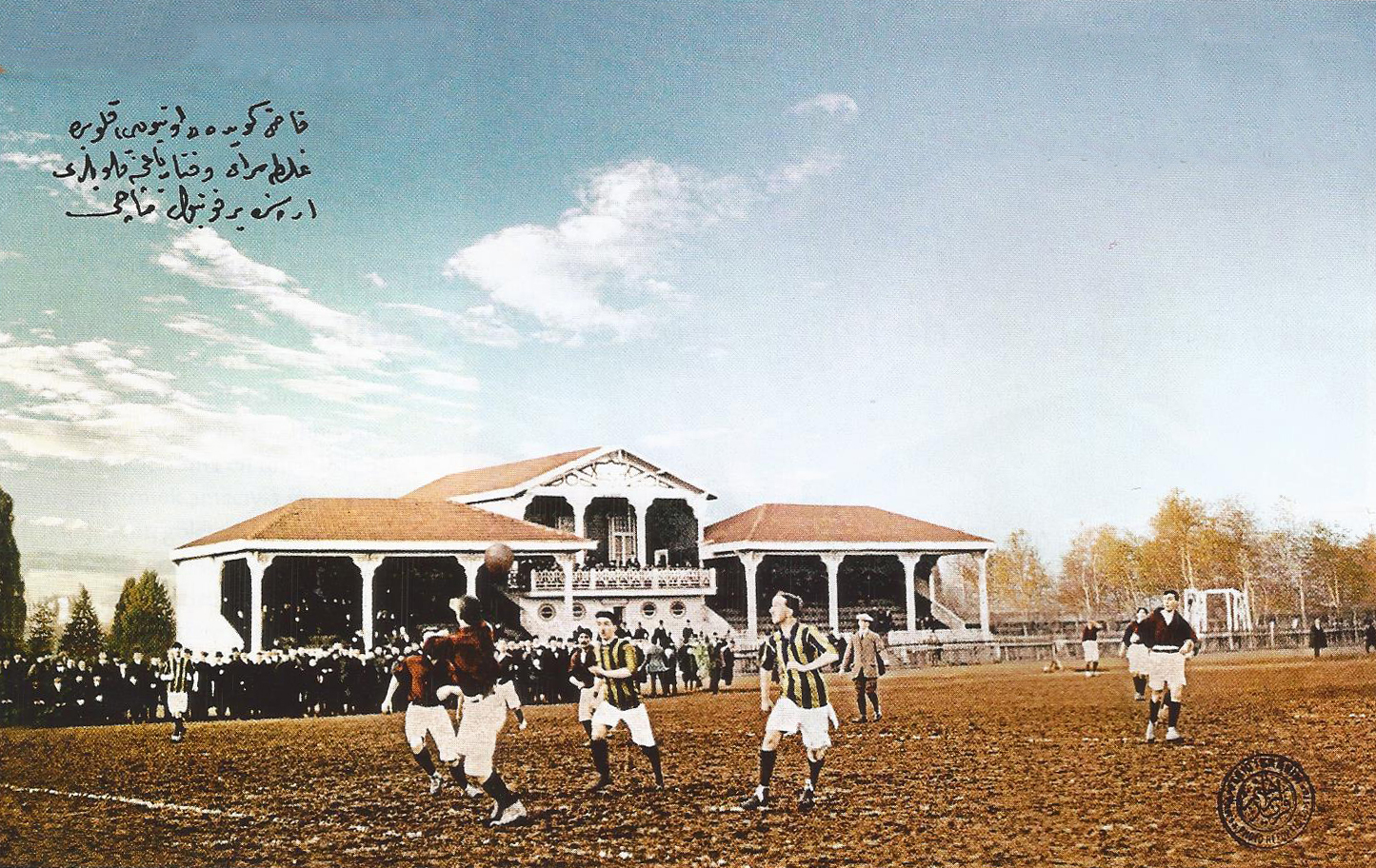
Match at Union Club Field, 1913–14.

The first game played between the two sides was a friendly game on Sunday, 17 January 1909. The game, staged at Papazın Çayırı where Şükrü Saracoğlu Stadium is located today, finished 2–0 in favour of Galatasaray. Fenerbahçe achieved their first victory over Galatasaray when they defeated them 4–2 in the 4th gameweek of the Istanbul Football League on Sunday, 4 January 1914.

On 21 September 2003, the two clubs played the Süper Lig game in front of a record attendance of 71,334 people, with drawing the game 2–2. The biggest win is achieved by Galatasaray with winning 7–0 on 12 February 1911. The biggest modern-day victory is when Fenerbahçe achieved their biggest win against Galatasaray on 6 November 2002 with 6–0, where four goals were scored when Fenerbahçe was one man down. Fenerbahçe are known for rarely losing at home in the Intercontinental Derby, in the Şükrü Saracoğlu Stadium, Galatasaray could not defeat Fenerbahçe for 20 years (in 23 consecutive matches) since 22 December 1999 until 23 February 2020, when Galatasaray ended Fenerbahçe's streak. Since then, Galatasaray has won five of the seven matches played there.

== Idea to merge Fenerbahçe and Galatasaray ==
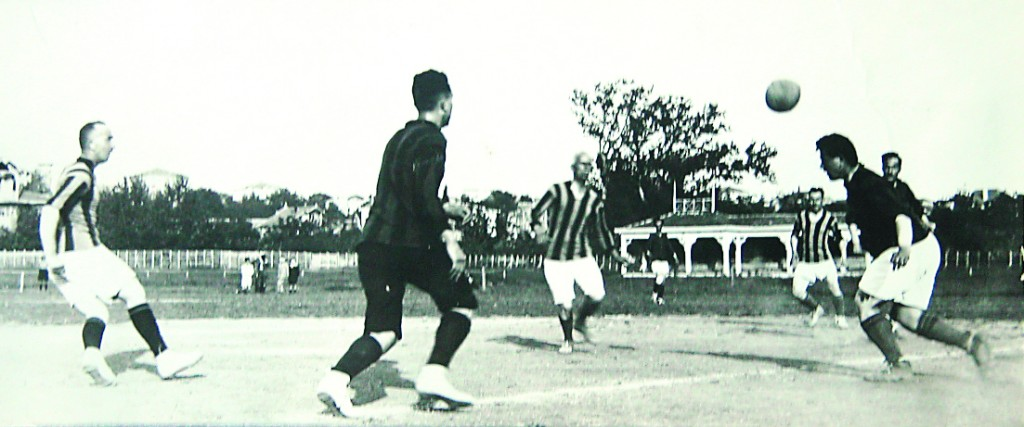
Match between the retired players in 1923

The first league games in Turkey were held in Istanbul in 1904. This league was called Istanbul Football League originally. The teams participating were called Cadi-Keuy FC, Moda FC, Elpis FC and HMS Imogene. These teams were made up of the English, Greek, and Armenian minorities living in Turkey. Galatasaray SK joined the league in 1906–07 and Fenerbahçe SK in 1908-09. Galatasaray SK did not participate in the 1911–12 season and the club suggested to loan Emin Bülent Serdaroğlu, Celal Ibrahim and two other Galatasaray SK players to Fenerbahçe SK for the match against Strugglers FC. But Fenerbahçe SK did not accept this offer. In 1912 Galatasaray SK president Ali Sami Yen and Fenerbahçe SK president Galip Kulaksızoğlu made a meeting. They arranged a protocol and agreed to form a strong Turkish team against the non-Turkish teams in the league. According to this agreement the new club would have been called Türkkulübü (The Turkish Club), full white kit with a red star. Additionally they also agreed to set up a museum. On 23 August 1912 they presented the petition to the International Olympic Committee – Ottoman section. Due to the Balkan Wars in 1913, this agreement could not be enforced.

== Beginning of the rivalry ==
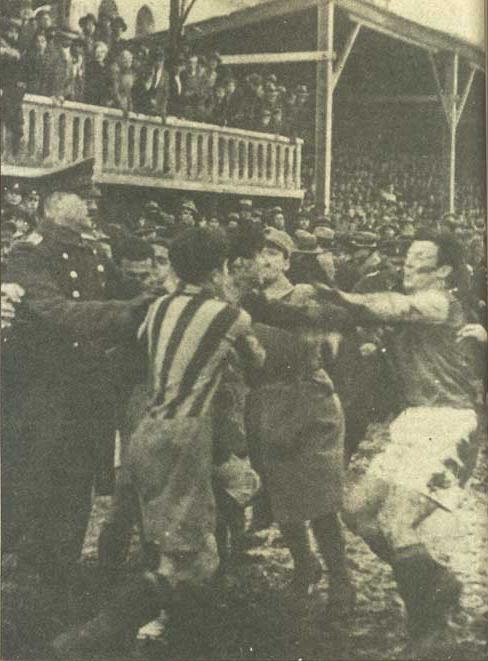
Fighting after a match in 1934. The player of Fenerbahçe on the left is Hüsamettin Böke, the player of Galatasaray on the right is Lütfü Aksoy.

=== 1934 riots ===
Friday 23 February 1934 was the day when unexpected riots happened at a supposed to be friendly match between Fenerbahçe and Galatasaray, played at Taksim Stadium. Milliyet reported the match by saying "those who went to watch the match yesterday watched a police chase, not football." Both teams wanted to win badly and therefore the match had to be stopped many times because of hard fouls. The high tension on the pitch caused high tension on the stands as well. The game ended with players fighting. The referee had no choice except to abandon the match. It was the end of friendly displays between both clubs.

=== Professionalization of Turkish football ===
The professional nationwide league (known as Super League today) was formed in 1959, a few years after the foundation of UEFA in 1954. It is the top-flight professional league in Turkish nationwide football, and the most popular sporting competition in the country. The 1959 Millî Lig (National League) was the first season of the professional league in Turkey. The league was made up of sixteen clubs split into two groups: the Kırmızı Grup (Red Group) and Beyaz Grup (White Group), the colours of the Turkish flag. The first season took place in the calendar year of 1959, instead of 1958–59, because the qualifying stages took place in 1958. The final consisted of two legs took place between the winners of each group. Galatasaray won the Red Group and Fenerbahçe won the White Group, so both teams played each other to determine the champion. Galatasaray won the first match 1–0 with Metin Oktay's legendary goal which the ball ripped the net, but Fenerbahçe won the second leg 4–0 and won 4–1 on aggregate.

=== Graeme Souness Flag Incident ===
In the 1995–96 season, when Galatasaray reached the cup final against Fenerbahçe, Fenerbahçe were expected to win easily. However, Galatasaray beat Fenerbahçe in the first leg by a Dean Saunders penalty. Galatasaray manager Graeme Souness took a large Galatasaray flag after the match and planted it in the center of the pitch. According to Souness, he did it as a result of an insult from a Fenerbahce manager.

=== "The Watery Derby" Incident ===
During the 2006–07 Süper Lig season, Fenerbahçe was guaranteed to be the champions before the derby on 19 May 2007. Because of thousands of plastic water bottles, stadium seats and other materials thrown by Galatasaray fans in Ali Sami Yen Stadium, the match earned the nickname "watery derby" (Turkish: sulu derbi). The match ended with a Fenerbahçe victory.

=== "Kadıköy Memory" Incident ===
In the first match of the 2011–12 season, Galatasaray beat Fenerbahçe 3–1 in its first match at home on 7 December 2011. The match played in the second half of the league ended 2–2. Although Galatasaray had finished the regular season with a 9-point lead over Fenerbahçe that came in second place, it was decided during the season that a play-off format would be introduced just for that year. As the leading team Galatasaray had an advantage in the championship group but Fenerbahçe beat Galatasaray 2–1 at Ali Sami Yen Spor Kompleksi and continued its chances of championship by eliminating the point difference until the final week. The match played on 12 May 2012 ended goalless and Galatasaray was declared champions at Şükrü Saraçoğlu stadium. After the match, clashes broke out between security forces and Fenerbahçe fans, with fans flooding the stadium and throwing their seats. The clashes then spread into the Kadıköy district with Fenerbahçe fans fighting with the opposition fans and setting nearby places on fire. After the events were suppressed, the stadium lights were turned off and Turkish Football Federation announced the cup would be given in the dressing room following the events, effectively cancelling the planned ceremony. However, Galatasaray management and the team protested this decision and TFF President Yıldırım Demirören gave the cup to Galatasaray players on the grass of Şükrü Saracoğlu Stadium after the crisis that lasted about 3 hours. Galatasaray players wrote their names on the walls of the dressing room at the end of the match and added the note 'Kadıköy Memory' (Turkish: Kadıköy Hatırası), causing this event to be remembered by the public with this name.

=== Mourinho - Buruk incidents ===
On February 24, 2025, after a draw match (0–0) against Galatasaray, José Mourinho used the expression “they jumped like monkeys” in regards to Galatasaray bench. Following this statement, Galatasaray Club accused Mourinho of racism and discrimination, and filed a formal complaint with UEFA and FIFA. As the reactions grew, Mourinho filed a lawsuit against Galatasaray for reputational damages amounting to 1,907,000 Turkish liras. Following an investigation by the TFF, Mourinho was banned for four matches. Three days later, his fine was dropped to three matches. Former Galatasaray footballer Didier Drogba shared a post about his former boss José Mourinho, stating that he is not racist.

On April 2, 2025, Fenerbahçe hosted Galatasaray at Şükrü Saraçoğlu Stadium in the Ziraat Turkish Cup quarterfinal match. The match ended with a 2–1 victory for Galatasaray and the yellow-red team advanced to the semi-finals. During the celebrations of Galatasaray, José Mourinho came onto the pitch and pinched Galatasaray Technical Director Okan Buruk's nose with physical contact. The Turkish Football Federation's Professional Football Disciplinary Board (PFDK) banned Mourinho from 3 official competitions.

== Rivalry ==
Both clubs compete with each other for the title of the most successful football club in Turkey. Galatasaray won the Turkish Super League (established in 1959) championship 26 times and Fenerbahçe 19 times, and Galatasaray won the local Turkish Cup 19 times, while Fenerbahçe won it 7 times to date. Galatasaray has been a more successful club than Fenerbahçe in almost any period of European cups. Apart from the 2000 UEFA Cup champion and 2000 UEFA Super Cup champion titles, it has played quarter-finals many times in the European Cup and the Champions League and has the title of the Turkish club that has collected the most points in the Champions League so far. Fenerbahçe's greatest achievements in European cups are the Champions League quarter-finals in the 2007–08 season and the Europa League semi-finals in the 2012–13 season.

== Culture ==
The rivalry between the two top Turkish clubs can be traced back to some social, cultural, and regional differences. Galatasaray were founded in 1905 by Galatasaray High School students in the district of Beyoğlu. On the other hand, Fenerbahçe were founded in Kadıköy district by the members of affluent upper-class Ottoman families residing in the district, where football was first played in the Ottoman Empire and where British origin Levantine families had also lived.

Galatasaray were founded by old boys from Istanbul’s equivalent of Eton, the Galatasaray Lycée, a 400-year-old institution built to provide a French-language education for the elites of the Ottoman Empire. It was there, in 1905, that Ali Sami Yen convinced a group of his friends that they should start a football team, presenting them with a ball repaired with leather cut from his own shoes. The founding members and the first squad of Fenerbahçe were composed of individuals belonging to prominent upper-class Ottoman families. For instance, Nurizade Ziya Songülen, the founding father and first president of Fenerbahçe, was a grandson of Sultan Mahmud II and of Mehmed Nuri Efendi, who served as the Foreign Minister of the Ottoman Empire during the 1830s. Moreover, Osman Fuad Efendi and Ömer Faruk Efendi — both princes of the Ottoman dynasty — were among the figures who served as presidents of the club during its early years. Fenerbahçe meanwhile, were a club built on the new money of an economically thriving Anatolia. They were regarded as a microcosm for the rapidly modernizing Anatolia: ambitious, hard-working, and financially astute. These differences caused the derby between the two clubs to be considered a clash between Turkish aristocracy and bourgeoisie.

During the 1970s, Fenerbahçe were supported by an estimated amount of 60% of the country while Galatasaray were still heavily supported by the upper class society of Istanbul. However Galatasaray managed to close the popularity gap between the two clubs after the club started to thrive from 1987 onward especially in the 1990s eventually winning the UEFA Cup and UEFA Super Cup in 2000, matching and in many cases surpassing Fenerbahçe's historical success. The class differences between the fanbases have slowly faded out and the social gap that once separated the two sides has closed over the years. Nowadays, both clubs boost fanbases that represent all the social classes.

== Supporters ==
- In a 2011 poll, 1.4 million Turkish citizens were asked for the team that they support in Turkey by bilyoner.com, the results ended with Galatasaray scoring 35% of the votes while Fenerbahçe scored 34% making up almost seven tenths of Turkish fans. Fenerbahçe claimed the poll was unreliable for several reasons such as the number of people asked compared to the population and regions the poll was conducted in. Club officials stated Fenerbahçe is "always indisputably the most popular club in Turkey".
- According to the research conducted by Socios in July 2022, with the participation of 45,774 people in Turkey, Galatasaray had 37.6% of fan support from the population and Fenerbahçe had 32.3%.
- Galatasaray and Fenerbahçe are followed by large masses on social media. Galatasaray's social media accounts are followed by more people.

Fenerbahçe	Social media (As of March 2026)	Galatasaray
11.9 Mn	Instagram	18.1 Mn
12.8 Mn	X	14.9 Mn
8.9 Mn	Facebook	12 Mn
3.09 Mn	YouTube	3.85 Mn
36.69 Mn	Total	48.85 Mn

== Honours ==
The rivalry reflected in the Intercontinental Derby matches stems from the fact that Fenerbahçe and Galatasaray are the most successful football clubs in Turkey. As can be seen below, Galatasaray leads 26–19 in Süper Lig titles since its foundation in 1959, and 88–72 in total national and European cups.

As of 10 January 2026

- Numbers with this background indicate the record in the competition.

Fenerbahçe	Competition	Galatasaray
European
—	UEFA Super Cup	1
—	UEFA Europa League	1
—	Aggregate	2
National
19	Süper Lig	26
7	Turkish Cup	19
10	Turkish Super Cup	17
36	Aggregate	62
National (defunct)
3	Turkish Football Championship (defunct)	—
6	Turkish National Division (defunct)	1
8	Prime Minister's Cup (defunct)	5
1	Ataturk Cup (played only twice)	—
1	Spor Toto Cup (defunct)	—
—	50th Anniversary Cup (played only once)	1
19	Aggregate	7
Domestic (defunct)
16	Istanbul Football League (defunct)	15
1	Istanbul Cup (defunct)	2
17	Aggregate	17
72	Total aggregate	88

Note: Calculated based on official tournaments. Preparatory and special tournaments are not included.

== Highest attendance ==
Attendance Records
Rank	Attendance	Date	Game	Stadium
1	71,334	27 September 2003	Galatasaray – Fenerbahçe	Atatürk Olympic Stadium
2	71,061	11 May 2005	Galatasaray – Fenerbahçe	Atatürk Olympic Stadium
3	66,701	21 September 1973	Fenerbahçe – Galatasaray	İzmir Atatürk Stadium
4	58,397	10 January 2026	Galatasaray – Fenerbahçe	Atatürk Olympic Stadium
5	53,775	19 May 2024	Galatasaray – Fenerbahçe	Ali Sami Yen Spor Kompleksi

== Head-to-head ranking in Süper Lig ==
P.	59	60	61	62	63	64	65	66	67	68	69	70	71	72	73	74	75	76	77	78	79	80	81	82	83	84	85	86	87	88	89	90	91	92	93	94	95	96	97	98	99	00	01	02	03	04	05	06	07	08	09	10	11	12	13	14	15	16	17	18	19	20	21	22	23	24	25	26
1	1		1	1	1	1	1			1	1	1	1	1	1	1	1			1					1		1		1	1	1				1	1		1	1	1	1	1	1	1		1	1	1	1	1			1	1	1	1	1			1	1				1	1	1	1
2	2	2	2	2				2	2				2		2		2	2	2		2	2				2		2				2	2	2		2				2			2	2	2			2		2		2		2	2	2	2	2		2			2	2	2	2	2	2
3		3			3	3	3		3	3				3				3		3	3		3	3	3	3					3			3			3		3		3						3		3			3							3				3					
4								4			4																					4					4	4				4									4								4									
5																5			5								5	5	5				5		5																5																	
6																																													6	6												6			6	6						
7																																																														7						
8												8																		8																							8															
9																						9																																														
10																							10																																													
11																								11																																												
12																																																																				
13																																																																13				
14																																																																				
15																																																																				
16																																																																				
17																																																																				
18																																																																				
19																																																																				
20																																																																				
21																																																																				

- Total: Galatasaray with 35 higher finishes, Fenerbahçe with 33 higher finishes (as of the end of the 2025–26 season).
- Title Wins: Of 67 seasons, 44 seasons ended with either a Galatasaray or a Fenerbahçe championship.
- Championship Rivalry: 41 seasons ended with Galatasaray and Fenerbahçe finishing in the top three, with 19 of them having them in the top two.
- Lowest Finishes: The league is played with an average of 18 teams and Galatasaray's lowest finish was 13th in the 21-22 season and Fenerbahçe's lowest finish was 10th in 1980-1981 season. Neither team has ever been relegated.

== Biggest wins ==
=== Fenerbahçe 0–7 Galatasaray (1911) ===
Fenerbahçe SK v Galatasaray SK
- Event: 1910–11 Istanbul Football League
Fenerbahçe	Galatasaray
0	7
- Date: 12 February 1911
- Venue: Papazın Çayırı, Istanbul, Ottoman Empire

According to Galatasaray, the club played Fenerbahçe on 12 February 1911 as part of the 1910–11 Istanbul Football League, having defeated them 5–0 at home prior. Initially, most of Galatasaray's squad could not cross the Bosphorus by ferry due to a heavy storm, forcing them to start only six players before the addition of Emin Bülent Serdaroğlu ten minutes later. Fenerbahçe started a full lineup until their goalkeeper Ali Sait got injured in the 25th minute. They were unable to find a replacement for him, leading to the 7–0 scoreline as the ten remaining Fenerbahçe players helplessly defended the net by themselves. Emin scored twice, with Celal İbrahim netting four times and İdris Bey adding one more.

=== Fenerbahçe 6–0 Galatasaray (2002) ===
Fenerbahçe SK vs Galatasaray SK
- Event: 2002–03 Süper Lig
Fenerbahçe	Galatasaray
6	0
- Date: 6 November 2002
- City: Istanbul
- Referee: Mustafa Çulcu
- Attendance: 55.000
- Weather: Rainy
- Venue: Şükrü Saracoğlu Stadium

The Fenerbahçe 6–0 Galatasaray match occurred in Matchday 6 of the 2002–03 Süper Lig season, 6 November 2002, at the Şükrü Saracoğlu Stadium. It had the largest score difference of any Intercontinental Derby in the Süper Lig era. Fenerbahçe's goals were scored by Tuncay Şanlı, Ariel Ortega, Serhat Akın (twice), Ceyhun Eriş and Ümit Özat. The first two goals came in the first half, after which Ortega was sent off. Despite the numerical disadvantage, Fenerbahçe scored a further four goals in the second half. Galatasaray were also reduced to ten men when Emre Aşık received a straight red.

== Matches ==
=== Head to head ===
As of 26 October 2026, Fenerbahce leads over Galatasaray in Super Lig games which they won 13 games more: 53 won and 40 lost, 46 ended in draw. In total official games Fenerbahce leads 102-90 in wins, 93 ended in draw. However, in Turkish Cup and Super Cup games, Galatasaray is the more successful side with 18-5 wins, 12 ended in draw.

	Matches	Wins Fenerbahçe	Draws	Wins Galatasaray	Goals Fenerbahçe	Goals Galatasaray
Süper Lig	139	53	46	40	166	139
Turkish Cup	27	3	10	14	29	44
Turkish Super Cup	8	2	2	4	7	12
Total Süper Lig & Cup matches	174	58	58	58	202	195
Turkish Federation Cup	3	1	0	2	6	7
Istanbul Football League	82	33	24	25	134	118
Turkish National Division	20	8	7	5	26	26
Prime Minister's Cup	3	2	1	0	5	3
Spor Toto Cup	2	0	2	0	2	2
50th Anniversary Cup	1	0	1	0	0	0
Total official matches	285	102	93	90	375	351
Exhibition games	122	48	32	42	172	159
Total	407	150	125	132	547	510

=== Biggest wins (5+ goals) ===
Score	Date
Fenerbahçe SK 0–7 Galatasaray SK	12 February 1911
Fenerbahçe SK 0–6 Galatasaray SK	4 May 1913
Fenerbahçe SK 6–0 Galatasaray SK	6 November 2002
Fenerbahçe SK 1–6 Galatasaray SK	2 October 1914
Fenerbahçe SK 6–1 Galatasaray SK	23 February 1936
Fenerbahçe SK 6–1 Galatasaray SK	12 December 1976
Galatasaray SK 5–0 Fenerbahçe SK	4 December 1910
Fenerbahçe SK 0–5 Galatasaray SK	15 March 1942
Fenerbahçe SK 0–5 Galatasaray SK	18 December 1960
Fenerbahçe SK 5–0 Galatasaray SK	16 August 1980

=== Most consecutive wins ===
Games	Club	Period
8	Galatasaray SK	17 January 1909 – 26 October 1913
6	Galatasaray SK	1 June 1941 – 17 May 1942
5	Fenerbahçe SK	30 June 1922 – 2 November 1923
5	Fenerbahçe SK	16 August 1976 – 9 January 1977

=== Most consecutive wins in Super League ===
Games	Club	Period
6	Fenerbahçe SK	22 May 2005 – 8 December 2007

=== Most consecutive wins at home in Super League ===
Games	Club	Period
10	Fenerbahçe SK	6 May 2001 – 25 November 2009

=== Most consecutive draws ===
Games	Period
5	22 October 2017 – 28 September 2019
4	21 October 1951 – 30 November 1952
4	19 August 1964 – 27 June 1965
4	22 January 1984 – 30 September 1984
4	6 October 1985 – 13 August 1986

=== Most consecutive matches without a draw ===
Games	Period
20	22 December 1916 – 15 August 1924
14	17 May 1989 – 21 August 1993

=== Longest undefeated runs ===
Games	Club	Period
18	Fenerbahçe SK	17 May 1942 – 1 December 1946
14	Fenerbahçe SK	9 May 1976 – 19 January 1980
13	Fenerbahçe SK	29 April 1973 – 14 December 1975
11	Galatasaray SK	19 February 1950 – 30 November 1952

=== Longest undefeated run at home ===
Years	Club	Period
20	Fenerbahçe SK	23 December 1999 – 22 February 2020

=== Highest scoring matches ===
Goals	Home	Score	Away	Date
8	Galatasaray SK	4–4	Fenerbahçe SK	5 June 1983
8	Fenerbahçe SK	4–4	Galatasaray SK	7 February 2001

=== Most consecutive matches without conceding a goal ===
Games	Club	Period
8	Galatasaray	17 January 1909 – 26 October 1913
5	Fenerbahçe	30 June 1922 – 2 November 1923
5	Fenerbahçe	3 January 1943 – 6 February 1944

=== Most consecutive games scoring ===
Games	Club	Period
22	Fenerbahçe SK	2 October 1914 – 2 November 1923
21	Fenerbahçe SK	18 August 1990 – 22 October 1995
15	Fenerbahçe SK	16 August 1976 – 19 January 1980
12	Galatasaray SK	30 April 1946 – 26 December 1930
12	Galatasaray SK	22 March 1989 – 18 August 1991

=== Player Statistics ===
==== Most appearances ====
Player	Games	Club
Turgay Şeren	55	Galatasaray SK
Cüneyt Tanman	53	Galatasaray SK
Esat Kaner	49	Fenerbahçe SK
Şeref Has	49	Fenerbahçe SK
Fikret Arıcan	46	Fenerbahçe SK
Müjdat Yetkiner	46	Fenerbahçe SK
Bülent Korkmaz	46	Galatasaray SK
Zeki Rıza Sporel	45	Fenerbahçe SK
Lefter Küçükandonyadis	44	Fenerbahçe SK
Nihat Bekdik	44	Galatasaray SK
Metin Oktay	44	Galatasaray SK

==== Top scorers ====
Player	Goals	Club
Zeki Rıza Sporel	27	Fenerbahçe SK
Alaattin Baydar	24	Fenerbahçe SK
Lefter Küçükandonyadis	20	Fenerbahçe SK
Metin Oktay	19	Galatasaray SK
Hakan Şükür	16	Galatasaray SK
Naci Bastoncu	15	Fenerbahçe SK
Tanju Çolak	14	Galatasaray SK
Cemil Turan	14	Fenerbahçe SK
Osman Arpacıoğlu	12	Fenerbahçe SK
Cemil Gürgen Erlertürk	12	Galatasaray SK
Aykut Kocaman	12	Fenerbahçe SK
Emin Bülent Serdaroğlu	12	Galatasaray SK
Gökmen Özdenak	10	Galatasaray SK

==== Most goals by a player in a match ====
Goals	Player	Club	Score	Date
4	Celal İbrahim	Galatasaray SK	7–0	12 February 1911
4	Cemil Gürgen Erlertürk	Galatasaray SK	4–0	24 September 1939
4	Metin Oktay	Galatasaray SK	5–0	18 December 1960

== Crossing the Bosphorus ==
(In bold: Subsequent Clubs)

=== Players ===
==== Galatasaray to Fenerbahçe ====
- **(Turkey) Hamit Hüsnü Kayacan (Gala 1905–1912, Fener 1912–1913)**
- **(Turkey) Galip Kulaksızoğlu (Gala 1906–1907, Fener 1907–1922)**
- **(Turkey) Hasan Kâmil Sporel (Gala 1910–1911, Fener 1918–1923)**
- **(Turkey) Hikmet Topuzer (Gala 1909, Fener 1909–1915)**
- **(Turkey) Ismail Kurt (Gala 1956–1960, Fener 1960–1966)**
- **(Turkey) Mehmet Oğuz (Gala 1967–1979, Fener 1979–1980)**
- **(Turkey) Engin Verel (Gala 1973–1975, Fener 1975–1979/1983–1986)**
- (Turkey) Güngör Tekin (Gala 1975–1980, Fener 1981–1983)
- **(Turkey) Erdoğan Arıca (Gala 1977–1981, Fener 1981–1986)**
- **(Turkey) Semih Yuvakuran (Gala 1983–1990, Fener 1990–1995)**
- **(Turkey) Tanju Çolak (Gala 1987–1991, Fener 1991–1993)**
- **(Turkey) Mustafa Yücedağ (Gala 1990–1992, Fener 1992–1993)**
- (Turkey) Benhur Babaoğlu (Gala 1993–1994, Fener 1996–1997)
- (Bosnia and Herzegovina) Elvir Bolić (Gala 1992–1993, Fener 1995–2000)
- (Turkey) Emre Belözoğlu (Gala 1994–2001, Fener 2008–2012/2013–2015/2019–2020)
- (Turkey) Sedat Balkanlı (Gala 1994–1995, Fener 1996)
- (Turkey) Saffet Sancaklı (Gala 1994–1995, Fener 1996–1998)
- (Turkey) Fatih Akyel (Gala 1997–2001, Fener 2002–2004)
- (Turkey) Mehmet Yozgatlı (Gala 1999–2001, Fener 2004–2007)
- **(Turkey) Caner Erkin (Gala 2009–2010, Fener 2010–2016/2020–2021)**
- (Turkey) Mehmet Topal (Gala 2006–2010, Fener 2012–2019)
- **(Turkey) Tolga Ciğerci (Gala 2016–2018, Fener 2018–2021)**
- **(Turkey) Serdar Aziz (Gala 2016–2019, Fener 2019–2025)**
- (Cape Verde) Garry Rodrigues (Gala 2017–2019, Fener 2019–2020)
- (Turkey) Sinan Gümüş (Gala 2014–2019, Fener 2020–2022)
- (Turkey) Emre Mor (Gala 2019–2020, Fener 2022–)
- (Portugal) Bruma (Gala 2013–2017, Fener 2022–2023)
- (Turkey) Bartuğ Elmaz (Gala 2020–2022, Fener 2023–)
- (Turkey) Kerem Aktürkoğlu (Gala 2020–2024, Fener 2025–)

==== Fenerbahçe to Galatasaray ====
- **(Turkey) Dalaklı Hüseyin (Fenerbahçe 1907–1911, Galatasaray 1911–1913)**
- **(England) Horace Armitage (Fener 1908, Gala 1908–1911)**
- (Turkey) Bekir Refet (Fener 1912–1914, Gala 1921)
- **(Turkey) Niyazi Tamakan (Fener 1952–1960, Gala 1960–1962)**
- **(Turkey) Naci Erdem (Fener 1953–1964, Gala 1964–1966)**
- **(Turkey) Raşit Çetiner (Fener 1978–1981, Gala 1981–1986)**
- **(Turkey) Hasan Vezir (Fener 1988–1989, Gala 1989–1991)**
- (Turkey) Selçuk Yula (Fener 1979–1986, Gala 1991–1993)
- (Turkey) Erhan Önal (Fener 1981–1982, Gala 1985–1992)
- **(Turkey) İlyas Tüfekçi (Fener 1983–1986, Gala 1986–1990)**
- (Turkey) Emre Aşık (Fener 1993–1996, Gala 2000–2003/2006–2007/2008–2010)
- (Turkey) Ahmet Yıldırım (Fener 1993–1994, Gala 1999–2001)
- (Bosnia and Herzegovina) Elvir Baljić (Fener 1998–1999, Gala 2002–2004)
- **(Turkey) Abdullah Ercan (Fener 1999–2003, Gala 2003–2004)**
- **(Turkey) Sergen Yalçın (Fener 1999–2000, Gala 2000/2001–2002)**
- **(Israel) Haim Revivo (Fener 2000–2002, Gala 2002–2003)**
- (Turkey) Servet Çetin (Fener 2003–2006, Gala 2007–2012)
- **(Croatia) Stjepan Tomas (Fener 2003–2004, Gala 2004–2007)**
- **(Turkey) Colin Kazim-Richards (Fener 2007–2011, Gala 2011–2012)**
- (Turkey) Burak Yılmaz (Fener 2008–2010, Gala 2012–2016)
- (Turkey) Olcan Adın (Fener 2003–2008, Gala 2014–2016)
- (Turkey) Bilal Kısa (Fener 2000–2003, Gala 2015–2016)
- **(Turkey) Şener Özbayraklı (Fener 2015–2019, Gala 2019–2021)**
- **(Belgium) Michy Batshuayi (Fener 2022–2024, Gala 2024–2025)**

=== Manager ===
==== Galatasaray to Fenerbahçe ====
- **(England) Peter Molloy (Gala 1947–1949, Fener 1949–1951)**
- (Serbia) Tomislav Kaloperović (Gala 1968–1970, Fener 1976–1978)
- (Croatia) Tomislav Ivić (Gala 1983–1984, Fener 1995)
- (Turkey) Mustafa Denizli (Gala 1987–1989/1990–1992, 2015–2016 Fener 2000–2002)

==== Fenerbahçe to Galatasaray ====
- (Hungary) Jozsef Svensk (Fener 1932–1935/1938–1939, Gala 1947)
- **(Hungary) László Székely (Fener 1951–1953, Gala 1953–1954)**

== List of all matches ==
Fenerbahçe win
Galatasaray win
Draw

No.	Date	Competition	Home	Score	Away	Home goal scorers	Away goal scorers	Notes
1	17 January 1909	Friendly	Fenerbahçe	0–2	Galatasaray	-	Emin Bülent (?), Celal (?)	(Note: First ever Intercontinental Derby Match)
2	9 January 1910	Istanbul Lig	Galatasaray	3–0	Fenerbahçe	Celal (?), Armitage (?), Fuat Hüsnü (?)		
3	4 December 1910	Istanbul Lig	Galatasaray	5–0	Fenerbahçe	Rees (2x?), Fuat Hüsnü (2x?), Celal (?)		
4	12 February 1911	Istanbul Lig	Fenerbahçe	0–7	Galatasaray	-	Celal 4x(?), Emin Bülent 2x(?), Idris (?)	(Note: Biggest Galatasaray victory.)
5	16 April 1912	Friendly	Fenerbahçe	0–1	Galatasaray	-	Emin Bülent (?)	
6	4 May 1913	Friendly	Fenerbahçe	0–6	Galatasaray	-	Hasnun 2x(?), Emil Oberle 3x(?), Bekir (?)	
7	25 May 1913	Friendly	Fenerbahçe	0–1	Galatasaray	-	Emin Bülent (80)	
8	26 October 1913	Friendly	Fenerbahçe	0–3	Galatasaray	-	Emil Oberle 2x(?), Mıgırdıç	
9	4 January 1914	Istanbul Lig	Fenerbahçe	4–2	Galatasaray	Hasan Kamil 3x(?), Sait (?)	?	
10	3 May 1914	Istanbul Lig	Galatasaray	0–0	Fenerbahçe	-	-	
11	2 October 1914	Friendly	Galatasaray	6–1	Fenerbahçe	Yusuf Ziya 2x(?), Hasnun (?), ?	?	
12	19 February 1915	Friendly	Fenerbahçe	4–0	Galatasaray	?	-	
13	11 February 1916	Istanbul Lig	Fenerbahçe	3–1	Galatasaray	Sait Selahattin 2x(?), Galip (?)	?	
14	3 March 1916	Istanbul Lig	Galatasaray	2–2	Fenerbahçe	?	Galip (?), Hikmet (?)	
15	22 December 1916	Istanbul Lig	Fenerbahçe	4–1	Galatasaray	Sait Selahattin 2x(?), Zeki Rıza (?), Konstantin (?)	?	
16	6 April 1917	Istanbul Lig	Galatasaray	2–3	Fenerbahçe	?	Sait Selahattin (?), Zeki Rıza (?), Konstantin (?)	
17	21 December 1917	Istanbul Lig	Galatasaray	3–2	Fenerbahçe	?	Miço (?), Zeki Rıza (?)	
18	12 April 1918	Istanbul Lig	Fenerbahçe	3–0	Galatasaray	awarded 3–0 win		
19	19 September 1918	Friendly	Fenerbahçe	4–0	Galatasaray	Zeki Rıza (20, 75, 85), Alâaddin (30)	-	
20	3 October 1919	Friendly	Fenerbahçe	3–0	Galatasaray	Alâaddin (55), İsmet (70), Sabih (80)	-	
21	19 March 1920	Friendly	Galatasaray	4–1	Fenerbahçe	?	?	
22	21 May 1920	Friendly	Fenerbahçe	4–0	Galatasaray	?	-	
23	1 October 1920	Friendly	Fenerbahçe	3–2	Galatasaray	Galip (7), Alâaddin (26), Sabih (32)	Necip (5), Sadi (20)	
24	17 December 1920	Istanbul Lig	Galatasaray	1–4	Fenerbahçe	?	Zeki Rıza 2x(?), Hüsnü (?), Sabih (?)	
25	1 April 1921	Istanbul Lig	Fenerbahçe	4–0	Galatasaray	Sabih (?), Zeki Rıza (?), Alâaddin (?), ?	-	
26	2 June 1921	Friendly	Galatasaray	2–1	Fenerbahçe	?	?	
27	4 November 1921	Istanbul Lig	Galatasaray	5–1	Fenerbahçe	Fazıl 2x(?), Necip Şahin (?), Suat (?), ?	Zeki Rıza (?)	
28	30 June 1922	Friendly	Galatasaray	0–3	Fenerbahçe	-	?	
29	17 November 1922	Istanbul Lig	Fenerbahçe	3–0	Galatasaray	Mehmet Nazif (?og), Galip (?), Zeki Rıza (?)	-	
30	9 March 1923	Istanbul Lig	Galatasaray	0–4	Fenerbahçe	-	Sabih (25), Ömer (32), Zeki Rıza (41), Alâaddin (80)	
31	15 June 1923	Friendly	Galatasaray	0–1	Fenerbahçe	-	?	
32	2 November 1923	Istanbul Lig	Fenerbahçe	4–0	Galatasaray	?	-	
33	7 March 1924	Istanbul Lig	Galatasaray	2–0	Fenerbahçe	?	-	
34	15 August 1924	Istanbul Lig	Galatasaray	3–2	Fenerbahçe	Nihat (?), Mehmet (?p), Mithat (?p)	Zeki Rıza 2x(?p)	
35	23 January 1925	Friendly	Galatasaray	0–0	Fenerbahçe	-	-	
36	24 April 1925	Friendly	Galatasaray	0–0	Fenerbahçe	-	-	
37	12 June 1925	Friendly	Fenerbahçe	1–0	Galatasaray	Zeki Rıza (78)	-	
38	30 April 1926	Istanbul Lig	Galatasaray	3–0	Fenerbahçe	Muslihiddin (25, 37), Nihat (40p)	-	
39	14 May 1926	Istanbul Lig	Fenerbahçe	1–3	Galatasaray	Alâaddin (73)	Mehmet Nazif (43), Vedat (60), Nihat (78)	
40	1 April 1927	Istanbul Lig	Galatasaray	5–1	Fenerbahçe	Mehmet (15), Ercüment (35, 48), Rebii (41, 83)	Sedat (80p)	
41	6 May 1927	Friendly	Galatasaray	1–1	Fenerbahçe	?	?	
42	10 August 1928	Gazi Büstü	Fenerbahçe	3–3	Galatasaray	Alâaddin (15), Fikret (30p), Sadi (45)	Kemal (25), Muslihiddin (73), Mehmet (82)	
43	31 August 1928	Gazi Büstü	Galatasaray	4–0	Fenerbahçe	Necdet (15, 80, 88), Şadli (60)	-	
44	16 November 1928	Istanbul Lig	Galatasaray	2–0	Fenerbahçe	Kemal (1, 21)	-	
45	10 May 1929	Istanbul Lig	Fenerbahçe	1–2	Galatasaray	Alâaddin (44)	Nihat (25), Latif (87)	
46	29 November 1929	Istanbul Lig	Fenerbahçe	3–2	Galatasaray	Zeki Rıza (31, 77), Alâaddin (40)	Latif (20), Kadri (38og)	
47	14 March 1930	Istanbul Shield	Fenerbahçe	3–1	Galatasaray	?	?	
48	28 March 1930	Istanbul Lig	Galatasaray	1–1	Fenerbahçe	Rebii (83)	Zeki Rıza (75)	
49	26 December 1930	Istanbul Lig	Galatasaray	1–1	Fenerbahçe	Rebii (17)	Muzaffer (61)	
50	20 March 1931	Istanbul Lig	Fenerbahçe	2–0	Galatasaray	Niyazi (65), Zeki Rıza (75)	-	
51	13 May 1932	Friendly	Fenerbahçe	1–2	Galatasaray	Alâaddin (40)	Mehmet (32), Rebii (50)	
52	27 May 1932	Friendly	Galatasaray	0–1	Fenerbahçe	-	?	
53	10 February 1933	Istanbul Lig	Fenerbahçe	5–1	Galatasaray	Zeki Rıza (12, 75), Mehmet Reşat (16), Muzaffer (48), Fikret (54p)	Mehmet (9)	
54	2 June 1933	Istanbul Lig	Galatasaray	0–2	Fenerbahçe	-	Şaban (53, 85)	
55	24 November 1933	Istanbul Lig	Fenerbahçe	1–0	Galatasaray	Niyazi (43)	-	
56	11 May 1934	Istanbul Lig	Galatasaray	0–0	Fenerbahçe	-	-	
55	21 September 1934	Istanbul Shield	Galatasaray	1–0	Fenerbahçe	?	-	
58	29 October 1934	Friendly	Fenerbahçe	1–0	Galatasaray	Fikret (47)	-	
59	30 November 1934	Istanbul Lig	Galatasaray	0–0	Fenerbahçe	-	-	
60	1 March 1935	Istanbul Lig	Galatasaray	4–0	Fenerbahçe	Fazıl (7, 34), Adnan (70), Münevver (79)	-	
61	8 March 1935	Istanbul Lig	Galatasaray	0–0	Fenerbahçe	-	-	
62	15 March 1935	Istanbul Lig	Fenerbahçe	1–0	Galatasaray	Niyazi (105)	-	
63	10 May 1935	Istanbul Shield	Fenerbahçe	2–1	Galatasaray	Fikret (23p), Naci (88)	Necdet (44)	
64	23 February 1936	Istanbul Lig	Fenerbahçe	6–1	Galatasaray	Naci (5), Şaban (14, 83), Niyazi (45), Ali Rıza (61), Esat (68)	Necdet (29p)	
65	19 April 1936	Istanbul Lig	Galatasaray	0–1	Fenerbahçe	-	Ali Rıza (26)	
66	5 July 1936	Friendly	Fenerbahçe	2–3	Galatasaray	Esat (59), Naci (76)	Bülent Ediz (5), Danyal Vuran (14), Gündüz (16)	
67	7 February 1937	Istanbul Lig	Fenerbahçe	4–1	Galatasaray	Bülent (19, 51, 85), Fikret (63p)	Bülent (14)	
68	23 February 1937	Friendly	Fenerbahçe	1–1	Galatasaray	?	?	
69	18 April 1937	Milli Küme	Galatasaray	0–0	Fenerbahçe	-	-	
70	27 June 1937	Milli Küme	Fenerbahçe	2–1	Galatasaray	Esat (53), Orhan (85)	Bülent (89)	
71	2 January 1938	Istanbul Lig	Galatasaray	2–3	Fenerbahçe	Haşim (60), Necdet (79p)	Bülent (21, 75), Fikret (84)	
72	29 January 1939	Istanbul Lig	Fenerbahçe	3–2	Galatasaray	Yaşar (7), Esat (60, 79)	Cemil (3), Necdet (84p)	
73	19 February 1939	Istanbul Lig	Galatasaray	1–1	Fenerbahçe	Bedii (27)	Ali Rıza (2)	
74	1 May 1939	Friendly	Galatasaray	4–1	Fenerbahçe	Sarafim (20, 46), Süleyman (55), Boduri (84)	Naci (36)	
75	21 May 1939	Milli Küme	Fenerbahçe	3–4	Galatasaray	Esat (7), Naci (55), Rebii (71)	Cemil (24, 30), Boduri (55p), Selahattin (85)	
76	4 June 1939	Milli Küme	Galatasaray	4–3	Fenerbahçe	Boduri (5, 69), Cemil (19), Musa (65)	Esat (31, 33), Basri (55)	
77	24 September 1939	Friendly	Galatasaray	4–0	Fenerbahçe	Cemil 4x(?)	-	
78	1 October 1939	Istanbul Lig	Fenerbahçe	1–0	Galatasaray	Rebii (71)	-	
79	30 October 1939	Friendly	Galatasaray	1–2	Fenerbahçe	?	?	
80	24 December 1939	Istanbul Lig	Galatasaray	3–1	Fenerbahçe	Selahattin Almay (27), Salim (50), Sarafim (54)	Musa (87og)	
81	7 January 1940	Friendly	Galatasaray	2–0	Fenerbahçe	?	?	
82	31 March 1940	Milli Küme	Galatasaray	1–1	Fenerbahçe	Süleyman (77)	Fikret (18)	
83	9 June 1940	Milli Küme	Fenerbahçe	3–2	Galatasaray	Naci (22, 70), Fikret (24)	Selahattin Almay (26), Sarafim (50)	
84	29 September 1940	Istanbul Lig	Fenerbahçe	1–1	Galatasaray	Basri (63)	Musa (70)	
85	30 October 1940	Friendly	Fenerbahçe	3–3	Galatasaray	?	?	
86	22 December 1940	Istanbul Lig	Galatasaray	0–2	Fenerbahçe	-	Niyazi (49, 70)	
87	9 March 1941	Friendly	Galatasaray	0–2	Fenerbahçe	-	?	
88	30 March 1941	Milli Küme	Fenerbahçe	1–0	Galatasaray	Naci (38)	-	
89	1 June 1941	Milli Küme	Galatasaray	2–1	Fenerbahçe	Selahattin (13, 57)	Fikret (20)	
90	9 June 1941	Friendly	Fenerbahçe	0–1	Galatasaray	-	?	
91	26 October 1941	Istanbul Lig	Galatasaray	2–1	Fenerbahçe	Mustafa (49), Hikmet (67)	Fikret (53)	
92	15 March 1942	Istanbul Kupası	Galatasaray	5–0	Fenerbahçe	Hikmet (4, 77), Cemil (25), Gündüz (37, 88)	-	
93	19 April 1942	Istanbul Lig	Fenerbahçe	1–2	Galatasaray	Melih (81)	Cemil (13), Arif (78)	
94	17 May 1942	Friendly	Fenerbahçe	1–3	Galatasaray	?	?	
95	27 September 1942	Istanbul Lig	Fenerbahçe	3–0	Galatasaray	awarded 3–0	-	
96	2 January 1943	Friendly	Fenerbahçe	0–0	Galatasaray	-	-	
97	3 January 1943	Istanbul Lig	Galatasaray	0–3	Fenerbahçe	-	awarded 3–0	
98	14 March 1943	Milli Küme	Galatasaray	0–0	Fenerbahçe	-	-	
99	9 May 1943	Milli Küme	Fenerbahçe	1–0	Galatasaray	Naci (3)	-	
100	14 November 1943	Istanbul Lig	Galatasaray	0–2	Fenerbahçe	-	İbrahim (64), Naci (85)	
101	6 February 1944	Istanbul Lig	Fenerbahçe	3–0	Galatasaray	awarded 3–0	-	
102	1 October 1944	Istanbul Lig	Galatasaray	2–2	Fenerbahçe	Reha (35), Şahap (54)	Halit (4), İbrahim (52)	
103	24 December 1944	Istanbul Lig	Fenerbahçe	2–2	Galatasaray	Müzdat (24), Şevket (90p)	Gündüz (20), Bülent (47)	
104	28 January 1945	Istanbul Kupası	Galatasaray	0–0	Fenerbahçe	-	-	
105	8 April 1945	Milli Küme	Fenerbahçe	1–1	Galatasaray	Naci (49)	Muzaffer (90p)	
106	20 May 1945	Milli Küme	Galatasaray	2–3	Fenerbahçe	Reha (38, 56)	Melih (30, 80), Şevket (68p)	
107	23 September 1945	Istanbul Kupası	Galatasaray	0–3	Fenerbahçe	-	?	
108	11 November 1945	Istanbul Lig	Galatasaray	0–0	Fenerbahçe	-	-	
109	13 January 1946	Istanbul Lig	Fenerbahçe	1–0	Galatasaray	Naci (3)	-	
110	9 March 1946	Milli Küme	Fenerbahçe	2–0	Galatasaray	?	-	
111	31 March 1946	Milli Küme	Galatasaray	1–1	Fenerbahçe	?	?	
112	20 October 1946	Istanbul Lig	Fenerbahçe	2–2	Galatasaray	Fikret (5), Melih (25)	Reha (6), Halis (29)	
113	1 December 1946	Friendly	Fenerbahçe	0–1	Galatasaray	-	?	
114	22 December 1946	Istanbul Kupası	Galatasaray	1–3	Fenerbahçe	?	?	
115	2 March 1947	Istanbul Lig	Galatasaray	1–0	Fenerbahçe	Korhan (21)	-	
116	23 March 1947	Milli Küme	Galatasaray	1–2	Fenerbahçe	Halis (65)	Halil (35), Malik (70)	
117	4 May 1947	Milli Küme	Fenerbahçe	2–1	Galatasaray	Selahattin (14), Suphi (65)	Bülent (72)	
118	8 June 1947	Friendly	Fenerbahçe	0–1	Galatasaray	-	?	
~	~	~	~	~	~	~	~	
124	14 November 1948	Istanbul Lig	Fenerbahçe	1–2	Galatasaray	Ahmet (85)	İsfendiyar (40), Reha (44)	
125	10 April 1949	Istanbul Lig	Galatasaray	1–0	Fenerbahçe	Reha (63)	-	
~	~	~	~	~	~	~	~	
152	1 December 1956	Federasyon Kupası	Galatasaray	3–2	Fenerbahçe	Kadri (13), Ergün (53), Metin (67)	Can (5), Şirzat (16)	
~	~	~	~	~	~	~	~	
164	17 December 1959	Süper Lig	Fenerbahçe	1–0	Galatasaray	Can Bartu (77)	-	
165	24 January 1960	Friendly	Fenerbahçe	1–2	Galatasaray	Lefter (62)	Uğur K. (41, 61)	
166	13 April 1960	Süper Lig	Galatasaray	2–1	Fenerbahçe	Ahmet B. (2), Metin Oktay (25)	Yükse (22)	
167	3 July 1960	Friendly	Fenerbahçe	1–0	Galatasaray	Lefter (46)	-	
168	7 September 1960	Friendly	Galatasaray	1–0	Fenerbahçe	Metin (56)	-	
1691	5 October 1960	Friendly	Fenerbahçe	0–0	Galatasaray	-	-	
170	18 December 1960	Süper Lig	Fenerbahçe	0–5	Galatasaray	-	Metin (1, 9, 61, 68), Bahri (25)	
171	25 June 1961	Süper Lig	Galatasaray	2–1	Fenerbahçe	Uğur (33), Ayhan (67)	Yükse (32)	
172	30 August 1961	Friendly	Fenerbahçe	2–0	Galatasaray	Candemir (1og), Lefter (28)	-	
173	20 September 1961	Friendly	Fenerbahçe	1–1	Galatasaray	Can (59)	Bahri (67)	
174	1 January 1962	Süper Lig	Galatasaray	1–0	Fenerbahçe	Bahri (32)	-	
175	14 February 1962	Friendly	Fenerbahçe	3–2	Galatasaray	Lefter (19, 55), Selim (70)	Talat (18, 44)	
176	24 May 1962	Süper Lig	Fenerbahçe	1–0	Galatasaray	Selim (75)	-	
177	24 April 1963	Süper Lig	Galatasaray	0–0	Fenerbahçe	-	-	
178	19 June 1963	Süper Lig	Fenerbahçe	1–1	Galatasaray	Şeref Has (50)	Metin (85)	
179	29 June 1963	Türkiye Kupası	Fenerbahçe	1–2	Galatasaray	Selim (60)	Uğur (40), Tarık (50)	
180	30 June 1963	Türkiye Kupası	Galatasaray	2–1	Fenerbahçe	Bahri (51), Mustafa (71)	Lefter (44p)	
181	1 December 1963	Süper Lig	Galatasaray	0–0	Fenerbahçe	-	-	
182	24 May 1964	Süper Lig	Fenerbahçe	0–0	Galatasaray	-	-	
183	2 July 1964	Atatürk Kupası	Fenerbahçe	3–1	Galatasaray	Ogün (54, 65), Şeref Has (83)	Metin (38)	
184	19 August 1964	TSYD Kupası	Fenerbahçe	1–1	Galatasaray	Şeref Has (88)	Bahri (29)	
185	3 January 1965	Süper Lig	Galatasaray	1–1	Fenerbahçe	Turan (69)	Aydın (25)	
186	21 March 1965	Süper Lig	Fenerbahçe	1–1	Galatasaray	Yıldırım (50)	Metin (20)	
187	27 June 1965	Türkiye Kupası	Fenerbahçe	0–0	Galatasaray	-	-	
188	18 August 1965	TSYD Kupası	Galatasaray	0–1	Fenerbahçe	-	Şenol (11)	
189	1 September 1965	Türkiye Kupası	Galatasaray	1–0	Fenerbahçe	Metin (33p)	-	
190	5 December 1965	Süper Lig	Galatasaray	2–0	Fenerbahçe	Ayhan (18, 68)	-	
191	24 January 1966	Friendly	Fenerbahçe	1–0	Galatasaray	Ogün (40)		
192	27 February 1966	Süper Lig	Fenerbahçe	0–0	Galatasaray	-	-	
193	4 June 1966	Türkiye Kupası	Fenerbahçe	0–0	Galatasaray	-	-	
194	12 June 1966	Türkiye Kupası	Galatasaray	3–1	Fenerbahçe	Şeref Has (79og), Metin (100p), Uğur (113)	Yaşar (47)	
195	28 August 1966	Friendly	Galatasaray	1–1	Fenerbahçe	Ergün (25)	Yaşar (86)	
196	13 November 1966	Süper Lig	Fenerbahçe	0–2	Galatasaray	-	Tarık (12), Ayhan (15p)	
197	1 December 1966	Friendly	Fenerbahçe	0–1	Galatasaray	-	Ergin (30)	
198	2 April 1967	Süper Lig	Galatasaray	1–3	Fenerbahçe	Ergün (26)	Şeref Has (5), Ogün (25), Yaşar (52)	
199	23 August 1967	Friendly	Fenerbahçe	1–2	Galatasaray	Nedim (38)	Ayhan (13, 50)	
200	8 October 1967	Süper Lig	Galatasaray	0–2	Fenerbahçe	-	Yaşar (11), Ercan (54p)	
201	8 October 1967	Süper Lig	Fenerbahçe	3–0	Galatasaray	Ogün (9), Yaşar (35), Abdullah (47)	-	
202	24 August 1968	Friendly	Galatasaray	0–0	Fenerbahçe	-	-	
203	17 November 1968	Süper Lig	Galatasaray	1–1	Fenerbahçe	Metin (55)	Abdullah (85)	
204	6 April 1969	Süper Lig	Fenerbahçe	1–0	Galatasaray	Salim (16)	-	
205	6 June 1969	Türkiye Kupası	Galatasaray	2–1	Fenerbahçe	Ergün (20), Metin (78)	Ögün (15)	
206	23 August 1969	Friendly	Galatasaray	1–1	Fenerbahçe	Ergün (69p)	Ögün (62p)	
207	3 September 1969	TSYD Kupası	Galatasaray	0–0	Fenerbahçe	-	-	
208	7 December 1969	Süper Lig	Galatasaray	1–0	Fenerbahçe	Gökmen (40)	-	
209	26 April 1970	Süper Lig	Fenerbahçe	1–0	Galatasaray	Nedim (60)	-	
210	16 August 1970	Friendly	Galatasaray	1–1	Fenerbahçe	Suphi Soylu (46)	Fuat Saner (29)	
211	26 August 1970	TSYD Kupası	Galatasaray	3–0	Fenerbahçe	Suphi Soylu (42), Savaş Yarbay (54), Metin Kurt (60)	-	
212	29 November 1970	Süper Lig	Galatasaray	1–1	Fenerbahçe	Olcay Başarır (55)	Mircea Sasu (10)	
213	2 May 1971	Süper Lig	Fenerbahçe	2–1	Galatasaray	Yılmaz Şen (54), Ogün Altıparmak (72)	Metin Kurt (49)	
~	~	~	~	~	~	~	~	
217	16 August 1972	Friendly	Fenerbahçe	0–0	Galatasaray	-	-	
218	30 August 1972	Friendly	Galatasaray	0–1	Fenerbahçe	-	Osman Arpacıoğlu (6)	
219	3 December 1972	Süper Lig	Fenerbahçe	1–1	Galatasaray	Osman Arpacıoğlu (65)	Ahmet Akkuş (43)	
220	21 January 1973	Friendly	Fenerbahçe	2–1	Galatasaray	Canan Açıkgöz (2p), Muharrem Algıç (20)	Gökmen Özdenak (8)	
221	29 April 1973	Süper Lig	Galatasaray	1–0	Fenerbahçe	Tuncay Temeller (28)	-	
222	9 June 1973	Süper Kupa	Galatasaray	1–2	Fenerbahçe	Metin Kurt (5)	Cemil Turan (19), Fuat Saner (45)	
223	11 August 1973	TSYD Kupası	Galatasaray	2–2	Fenerbahçe	Mehmet Oğuz (73), Mehmet Özgül (82)	Cemil Turan (30), Alpaslan Eratlı (64p)	
224	30 September 1973	Süper Lig	Galatasaray	0–0	Fenerbahçe	-	-	
225	30-13-1973	Friendly	Galatasaray	0–0	Fenerbahçe	-	-	
226	3 March 1974	Süper Lig	Fenerbahçe	2–1	Galatasaray	Ersoy Sandalcı (35), Osman Arpacıoğlu (40)	Gökmen Özdenak (52)	
227	20 March 1974	Türkiye Kupası	Fenerbahçe	0–0	Galatasaray	-	-	
228	17 April 1974	Türkiye Kupası	Galatasaray	0–3	Fenerbahçe	-	Cemil Turan (43, 48), Alpaslan Eratlı (88)	
229	28 July 1974	Friendly	Fenerbahçe	1–0	Galatasaray	Mustafa Kaplakaslan (47)	-	
230	3 August 1974	TSYD Kupası	Fenerbahçe	2–1	Galatasaray	Osman Arpacıoğlu (6, 86)	Mehmet Özgül (18)	
231	27 October 1974	Süper Lig	Fenerbahçe	0–0	Galatasaray	-	-	
232	23 March 1975	Süper Lig	Galatasaray	0–1	Fenerbahçe	-	Arif Aydın Çelik (71)	
233	9 August 1975	TSYD Kupası	Fenerbahçe	3–1	Galatasaray	Osman Arpacıoğlu (16), Ömer Kaner (63, 85)	Gökmen (60)	
234	27 August 1975	Friendly	Galatasaray	3–4	Fenerbahçe	Gökmen (10), Tuncay Temeller (43p), Mustafa Ergücü (90)	Ömer (7), Osman Arpacıoğlu (55, 62, 90)	
235	14 December 1975	Süper Lig	Fenerbahçe	1–3	Galatasaray	Cemil Turan (21)	Gökmen (32), Fatih Terim (71), Şevki Şenlen (80)	
236	9 May 1976	Süper Lig	Galatasaray	1–0	Fenerbahçe	Şevki Şenlen (73)	-	
237	16 August 1976	Friendly	Fenerbahçe	2–1	Galatasaray	Arif (65), Cemil Turan (85)	Gökmen (63)	
238	27 August 1976	Friendly	Galatasaray	1–2	Fenerbahçe	Faruk (43)	Ömer (31, 71)	
239	14 November 1976	Friendly	Fenerbahçe	4–2	Galatasaray	Osman (21, 84), Yenal (57p), Ender (76)	Nurettin (12), Şevki (22)	
240	9 January 1977	Friendly	Fenerbahçe	6–1	Galatasaray	Cemil Turan (27, 43, 44p), Engin (58), Ömer (68, 70)	Rıdvan (8)	
241	9 January 1977	Süper Lig	Fenerbahçe	1–0	Galatasaray	Cemil Turan (82)	-	
242	20 March 1977	Süper Lig	Galatasaray	1–1	Fenerbahçe	Şevki (1), Mehmet Ö. (40)	Osman (14), Önder (74)	
243	14 August 1978	TSYD Kupası	Fenerbahçe	1–0	Galatasaray	Yenal (63p), Bahri (74)	-	
244	2 October 1977	Süper Lig	Galatasaray	0–2	Fenerbahçe	-	Cemil Turan (9), Tuna (16)	
245	19 March 1978	Süper Lig	Fenerbahçe	2–2	Galatasaray	Cemil Turan (30), Antić (86)	Gökmen (7), Mehmet Oğuz (84)	
246	9 August 1978	TSYD Kupası	Fenerbahçe	1–0	Galatasaray	Cemil Turan (59)	-	
247	22 October 1978	Süper Lig	Galatasaray	1–1	Fenerbahçe	Erhan (53)	Erol (82)	
248	15 April 1979	Süper Lig	Fenerbahçe	2–0	Galatasaray	Erol (53), Şevki (88)	-	
249	17 August 1979	TSYD Kupası	Fenerbahçe	1–0	Galatasaray	Raşit (71)	-	
250	25 November 1979	Süper Lig	Fenerbahçe	1–1	Galatasaray	Tuna (10)	Fatih (63p)	
251	19 January 1980	Friendly	Galatasaray	3–1	Fenerbahçe	Bülent (3), Orhan (10), İbrahim (24)	İbrahim (48)	
252	4 May 1980	Süper Lig	Galatasaray	0–0	Fenerbahçe	-	-	
253	1 June 1980	Başbakanlık Kupası	Fenerbahçe	1–0	Galatasaray	Selçuk (103)	-	
254	3 August 1980	Friendly	Fenerbahçe	3–2	Galatasaray	Ali Kemal (42), Mustafa (53), Hasan (77)	Metin (40), Fatih (80)	
255	16 August 1980	TSYD Kupası	Fenerbahçe	5–0	Galatasaray	Ali Kemal (20), Raşit (32), Mustafa (44), Selçuk (55, 82)	-	
256	28 December 1980	Süper Lig	Fenerbahçe	0–1	Galatasaray	-	Turgay (25)	
257	25 January 1981	Friendly	Fenerbahçe	1–1	Galatasaray	Turgay (37)	Suat (48)	
258	22 February 1981	Süper Lig	Galatasaray	1–0	Fenerbahçe	Ali (53)	-	
259	12 August 1981	TSYD Kupası	Fenerbahçe	2–2	Galatasaray	Osman (39), Güngör (89)	Raşit (37), Bülent (86)	
260	18 October 1981	Süper Lig	Fenerbahçe	1–0	Galatasaray	Osman (76)	-	
261	14 February 1982	Friendly	Fenerbahçe	0–0	Galatasaray	-	-	
262	3 April 1982	Süper Lig	Galatasaray	0–0	Fenerbahçe	-	-	
263	7 April 1982	Türkiye Kupası	Galatasaray	2–0	Fenerbahçe	Cüneyt (38), Hodžić (39)	-	
264	14 April 1982	Türkiye Kupası	Fenerbahçe	2–2	Galatasaray	Osman (52), Alpaslan (64p)	Hodžić (20), Metin (76)	
265	20 June 1982	Friendly	Fenerbahçe	2–2	Galatasaray	?	?	
266	22 August 1982	TSYD Kupası	Galatasaray	1–2	Fenerbahçe	Fatih (85)	Ibrahimbegovic (10), Selçuk (51)	
267	26 December 1982	Süper Lig	Fenerbahçe	1–0	Galatasaray	Selçuk (6)	-	
268	6 December 1983	Friendly	Fenerbahçe	1–1	Galatasaray	Mehmet (60)	Hodžić (5)	
269	5 June 1983	Süper Lig	Galatasaray	4–4	Fenerbahçe	Sejdić (10), Bülent (16), Sinan (29), Hodžić (48)	Özcan (14, 67), Onur (59), Mehmet (71)	
270	13 August 1983	TSYD Kupası	Fenerbahçe	1–1	Galatasaray	Selçuk (55)	Hodžić (58)	
271	2 November 1983	Süper Lig	Fenerbahçe	1–2	Galatasaray	Repčić (65)	Öner (15), Sejdić (80)	
272	22 January 1984	Friendly	Galatasaray	1–1	Fenerbahçe	Erdoğan (90og)	Engin (24)	
273	8 April 1984	Süper Lig	Galatasaray	1–1	Fenerbahçe	Sejdić (1)	Karalić (73)	
274	19 August 1984	TSYD Kupası	Galatasaray	0–0	Fenerbahçe	-	-	
275	30 September 1984	Süper Lig	Galatasaray	1–1	Fenerbahçe	Erdal (42)	Pešić (61)	
276	12 January 1985	Friendly	Fenerbahçe	2–1	Galatasaray	Tuğrul (15), İlyas (51)	Raşit (61)	
277	6 February 1985	Türkiye Kupası	Fenerbahçe	1–2	Galatasaray	Müjdat (6)	Raşit (2), Fatih (21p)	
278	28 February 1985	Türkiye Kupası	Galatasaray	1–0	Fenerbahçe	Adnan (60)	-	
279	3 March 1985	Süper Lig	Fenerbahçe	2–2	Galatasaray	Hasan (20), Selçuk (71p)	Cüneyt (7), Yusuf (17)	
280	12 June 1985	Süper Kupa	Fenerbahçe	1–1	Galatasaray	Hüseyin (78)	Bülent (37)	
281	17 August 1985	TSYD Kupası	Fenerbahçe	2–0	Galatasaray	Önder (9), Şenol (75)	-	
282	6 October 1985	Süper Lig	Fenerbahçe	1–1	Galatasaray	Selçuk (9)	Bülent (11)	
283	18 January 1986	Friendly	Fenerbahçe	2–2	Galatasaray	Tuğrul (15), İlyas (32)	Bülent (18), Hakan (75)	
284	1 March 1986	Süper Lig	Galatasaray	0–0	Fenerbahçe	-	-	
285	13 August 1986	TSYD Kupası	Galatasaray	2–2	Fenerbahçe	Raşit (64p), Uğur (70)	Şenol (9, 29)	
286	21 September 1986	Süper Lig	Fenerbahçe	0–1	Galatasaray	Şenol (18)	Raşit (64), Uğur (87)	
287	22 February 1987	Süper Lig	Galatasaray	0–1	Fenerbahçe	-	Kayhan (40)	
288	8 August 1987	TSYD Kupası	Galatasaray	3–2	Fenerbahçe	Tanju (16, 82p), Kovačević (70)Nezihi (57), Kayhan (78)		
289	25 October 1987	Süper Lig	Galatasaray	1–1	Fenerbahçe	İlyas (23)	Şenol (59)	
290	19 March 1988	Süper Lig	Fenerbahçe	1–2	Galatasaray	Erdi (20)	Prekazi (69), Uğur (88)	
291	13 August 1988	TSYD Kupası	Galatasaray	1–0	Fenerbahçe	Tanju (57)	-	
292	24 September 1988	Süper Lig	Fenerbahçe	1–0	Galatasaray	Rıdvan (31)	-	
293	22 March 1989	Türkiye Kupası	Fenerbahçe	2–2	Galatasaray	İsmail (4p), Rıdvan (46)	Tanju (53, 73)	
294	3 May 1989	Türkiye Kupası	Galatasaray	3–4	Fenerbahçe	Tanju (11p, 16, 38)	Aykut (47), Hasan (53, 71, 82)	(Note: The largest comeback win in the derby's history, with Fenerbahce climbing back from 3-0 down to win 4-3.)
295	17 May 1989	Süper Lig	Galatasaray	1–1	Fenerbahçe	İsmail (68)	Oğuz (55)	
296	16 August 1989	TSYD Kupası	Galatasaray	1–0	Fenerbahçe	Keser (78)	-	
297	20 August 1989	Başbakanlık Kupası	Galatasaray	2–3	Fenerbahçe	Bülent (13), İlyas (22)	Şenol (27, 88), Aykut (92)	
298	16 December 1989	Süper Lig	Galatasaray	1–0	Fenerbahçe	Hasan (90)	-	
299	15 April 1990	Süper Lig	Fenerbahçe	5–1	Galatasaray	Şenol (11p), Aykut (26), Hakan (38), Şenol Ulusavaş (87), Oğuz (89)	Nezihi (26og)	
300	4 August 1990	Friendly	Galatasaray	2–0	Fenerbahçe	Mustafa (50, 60)	-	
301	11 August 1990	TSYD Kupası	Fenerbahçe	5–2	Galatasaray	Şenol (33p), Vokrri (36, 41), Hakan (44), Şenol Ulusavaş (79)	Tanju (24, 45)	
302	1 December 1990	Süper Lig	Fenerbahçe	1–2	Galatasaray	Jakołcewicz (47)	Tanju (6, 76)	
303	4 May 1991	Süper Lig	Galatasaray	4–1	Fenerbahçe	Kosecki (42), Tanju (53, 74), Keser (54)	Aykut (79p)	
304	18 August 1991	TSYD Kupası	Fenerbahçe	1–2	Galatasaray	Tanju (87)	Kosecki (53), Keser (59)	
305	5 October 1991	Süper Lig	Galatasaray	0–2	Fenerbahçe	-	Tanju (21, 52)	
306	22 April 1992	Süper Lig	Fenerbahçe	5–2	Galatasaray	Aykut (10, 48), Tanju (20, 80, 86)	Keser (52, 60)	
307	16 August 1992	TSYD Kupası	Fenerbahçe	2–3	Galatasaray	Tanju (35p), Stoilov (45)	Şükür (2), Götz (83, 90)	
308	8 November 1992	Süper Lig	Galatasaray	0–1	Fenerbahçe	-	Aykut (57)	
309	11 April 1993	Süper Lig	Fenerbahçe	1–4	Galatasaray	Tanju (68)	Gütschow (7), Tugay (50, 76p), Şükür (55)	
310	21 August 1993	TSYD Kupası	Galatasaray	2–2	Fenerbahçe	Kubilay (35), Şükür (45)	Oğuz (12), Hakan Tecimer (71)	
311	2 October 1993	Süper Lig	Fenerbahçe	2–0	Galatasaray	Oğuz (40), Bülent (89p)	-	
312	12 March 1994	Süper Lig	Galatasaray	2–1	Fenerbahçe	Tugay (38), Şükür (87)	Kemalettin (29)	
313	3 August 1994	TSYD Kupası	Fenerbahçe	4–3	Galatasaray	Bülent (30, 48), İlker (76), Mecnur (83)	Sedat (36), Suat (71), Arif (75)	
314	15 October 1994	Süper Lig	Galatasaray	1–1	Fenerbahçe	Sedat (71)	Bülent (42)	
315	8 February 1995	Türkiye Kupası	Fenerbahçe	1–1	Galatasaray	Aykut (72p)	Saffet (69)	
316	22 February 1995	Türkiye Kupası	Galatasaray	1–1	Fenerbahçe	Suat (52)	Aygün (22)	
317	19 March 1995	Süper Lig	Fenerbahçe	3–0	Galatasaray	Aykut (12p, 37p, 61)	-	
318	22 April 1995	Friendly	Fenerbahçe	1–1	Galatasaray	Feyyaz (12)	Saffet (58)	
319	25 May 1995	Başbakanlık Kupası	Fenerbahçe	1–1	Galatasaray	Kemalettin (115)	Kubilay Türkyılmaz (93)	
320	2 August 1995	TSYD Kupası	Fenerbahçe	3–1	Galatasaray	Bolić (12, 84), Aykut (55)	Saffet (38)	
321	22 October 1995	Süper Lig	Fenerbahçe	3–1	Galatasaray	Atkinson (4, 19, 32)	Saffet (83)	
322	22 March 1996	Süper Lig	Galatasaray	2–0	Fenerbahçe	Şükür (65), Arif (87)	-	
323	11 April 1996	Türkiye Kupası	Galatasaray	1–0	Fenerbahçe	Saunders (5)	-	
324	24 April 1996	Türkiye Kupası	Fenerbahçe	1–1	Galatasaray	Aykut (33)	Saunders (116)	
325	17 July 1996	Friendly	Fenerbahçe	0–0	Galatasaray	-	-	
326	24 July 1996	TSYD Kupası	Fenerbahçe	2–0	Galatasaray	Bolić (12), Tarık (85)	-	
327	8 September 1996	Süper Lig	Galatasaray	0–4	Fenerbahçe	-	Saffet (9), Okocha (23), Bolić (27, 82)	
328	9 February 1997	Süper Lig	Fenerbahçe	3–2	Galatasaray	Okocha (15), Bolić (53, 78)	Vedat (23), Arif (90)	
329	12 March 1997	Süper Kupa	Fenerbahçe	0–3	Galatasaray	-	Şükür (20, 67, 75)	
330	20 July 1997	TSYD Kupası	Galatasaray	4–2	Fenerbahçe	Hagi (27), Davala (40), Ergün (54), Ünsal (84)	Bolić (69), Saffet (90)	
331	5 September 1997	Süper Lig	Fenerbahçe	3–1	Galatasaray	Tayfun (17), Bolić (70), Okocha (71)	Tugay (61)	
332	15 February 1998	Süper Lig	Galatasaray	2–2	Fenerbahçe	Hagi (42), Ünsal (53)	Okocha (33), Bolić (89)	
333	26 July 1998	TSYD Kupası	Fenerbahçe	1–4	Galatasaray	Baljić (9)	Şükür (35), Hasan Şaş (51, 62), Arif (70)	
334	20 September 1998	Süper Lig	Fenerbahçe	2–2	Galatasaray	Moldovan (15), Baljić (18)	Hagi (21), Şükür (87)	
335	7 March 1999	Süper Lig	Galatasaray	2–0	Fenerbahçe	Okan (54), Şükür (82)	-	
336	24 July 1999	TSYD Kupası	Fenerbahçe	1–1	Galatasaray	Alpay (46)	Hagi (3)	
337	22 December 1999	Süper Lig	Fenerbahçe	1–2	Galatasaray	Moldovan (50)	Hasan Şaş (19), Márcio (30)	(Note: Last Galatasaray win Fenerbahce's stadium until 2020.)
338	26 March 2000	Süper Lig	Galatasaray	0–1	Fenerbahçe	-	Johnson (82)	
339	26 November 2000	Süper Lig	Galatasaray	0–0	Fenerbahçe	-	-	
340	7 February 2001	Türkiye Kupası	Fenerbahçe	4–4	Galatasaray	Ogün (23), Serhat (29), Johnson (37), Revivo (66)	Hasan Şaş (6, 52), Jardel (85), Davala (90+3)	
341	6 May 2001	Süper Lig	Fenerbahçe	2–1	Galatasaray	Ali Güneş (12), Yusuf (52)	Suat (75)	
342	22 September 2001	Süper Lig	Galatasaray	2–0	Fenerbahçe	Akın (54), Serkan (81)	-	
343	16 February 2002	Süper Lig	Fenerbahçe	1–0	Galatasaray	Rapaić (27)	-	
344	6 November 2002	Süper Lig	Fenerbahçe	6–0	Galatasaray	Tuncay (8), Ortega (38), Serhat (68, 75), Eriş (78), Özat (86)	-	(Note: Biggest Fenerbahce victory margin in the history of the Intercontinental derby.)
345	8 March 2003	Süper Lig	Galatasaray	2–0	Fenerbahçe	Karan (21, 34)	-	
346	21 September 2003	Süper Lig	Galatasaray	2–2	Fenerbahçe	Arif (44), Şükür (50)	Kemal (43), van Hooijdonk (48)	
347	29 February 2004	Süper Lig	Fenerbahçe	2–1	Galatasaray	Nobre (17), Yozgatlı (85)	Erdoğan (28)	
348	12 December 2004	Süper Lig	Galatasaray	1–0	Fenerbahçe	Necati (55)	-	
349	11 May 2005	Türkiye Kupası	Galatasaray	5–1	Fenerbahçe	Ribery (16), Necati (25), Şükür (36, 72, 88)	Luciano (42)	
350	22 May 2005	Süper Lig	Fenerbahçe	1–0	Galatasaray	Nobre (65)	-	
351	27 November 2005	Süper Lig	Galatasaray	0–1	Fenerbahçe	-	Nobre (45)	
352	8 March 2006	Türkiye Kupası	Fenerbahçe	2–1	Galatasaray	Luciano (25), Alex (85)	Karan (56)	
353	22 March 2006	Türkiye Kupası	Galatasaray	3–2	Fenerbahçe	Ayhan (12), Necati (36), Şükür (76)	Tuncay (8), Appiah (72)	
354	22 April 2006	Süper Lig	Fenerbahçe	4–0	Galatasaray	Appiah (12), Luciano (20), Alex (70), Anelka (74)	-	
355	3 December 2006	Süper Lig	Fenerbahçe	2–1	Galatasaray	Alex (24), Kežman (26)	Karan (54)	
356	19 May 2007	Süper Lig	Galatasaray	1–2	Fenerbahçe	Arda (89)	Lugano (24), Edu (39)	(Note: Colloquially known as "Sulu Derbi" (The Watery Derby). Taking place after Fenerbahce secured the league title on Galatasaray's centennial year and unofficially on "Galatasaray day" (19/05 making up the club's founding year), the derby was marred by foreign objects and particularly water bottles that were thrown onto the pitch.)
357	8 December 2007	Süper Lig	Fenerbahçe	2–0	Galatasaray	Semih (5), Deivid (56)	-	
358	3 February 2008	Türkiye Kupası	Fenerbahçe	0–0	Galatasaray	-	-	
359	27 February 2008	Türkiye Kupası	Galatasaray	2–1	Fenerbahçe	Şükür (4), Karan (90)	Gökhan (67)	
360	27 April 2008	Süper Lig	Galatasaray	1–0	Fenerbahçe	Nonda (37)	-	
361	9 November 2008	Süper Lig	Fenerbahçe	4–1	Galatasaray	Selçuk (7), Aşık (28og), Lugano (48), Deivid (89)	Lincoln (2)	
362	12 April 2009	Süper Lig	Galatasaray	0–0	Fenerbahçe	-	-	
363	25 October 2009	Süper Lig	Fenerbahçe	3–1	Galatasaray	Alex (13, 55p), Güiza (89)	Balta (58)	
364	28 March 2010	Süper Lig	Galatasaray	0–1	Fenerbahçe	-	Selçuk (70)	
365	21 July 2010	Friendly	Fenerbahçe	1–0	Galatasaray	Santos (30)	-	
366	24 October 2010	Süper Lig	Fenerbahçe	0–0	Galatasaray	-	-	
367	18 March 2011	Süper Lig	Galatasaray	1–2	Fenerbahçe	Colin Kazim (14)	Semih (75), Alex (88)	(Note: First derby in the new Ali Sami Yen Stadium.)
368	7 December 2011	Süper Lig	Galatasaray	3–1	Fenerbahçe	Eboué (33), Elmander (41), Melo (66)	Alex (90)	
369	17 March 2012	Süper Lig	Fenerbahçe	2–2	Galatasaray	Sow (10), Alex (15)	Elmander (35), Hakan (83)	
370	22 April 2012	Süper Lig	Galatasaray	1–2	Fenerbahçe	Selçuk (68)	Ziegler (17), Stoch (79)	
371	12 May 2012	Süper Lig	Fenerbahçe	0–0	Galatasaray	-	-	
372	12 August 2012	Süper Kupa	Galatasaray	3–2	Fenerbahçe	Umut (19, 57), Selçuk (90p)	Alex (45), Kuyt (66)	
373	16 December 2012	Süper Lig	Galatasaray	2–1	Fenerbahçe	Bekir (10og), Selçuk (35)	Hasan Ali (24)	
374	12 May 2013	Süper Lig	Fenerbahçe	2–1	Galatasaray	Webó (32, 36)	Burak (25p)	
375	11 August 2013	Süper Kupa	Galatasaray	1–0	Fenerbahçe	Drogba (99)		
376	10 November 2013	Süper Lig	Fenerbahçe	2–0	Galatasaray	Emre (22p), Baroni (66)		
377	6 April 2014	Süper Lig	Galatasaray	1–0	Fenerbahçe	Sneijder (9)		
378	25 August 2014	Süper Kupa	Fenerbahçe	0–0	Galatasaray			
379	18 October 2014	Süper Lig	Galatasaray	2–1	Fenerbahçe	Sneijder (88, 90)	Alper (90+5)	
380	8 March 2015	Süper Lig	Fenerbahçe	1–0	Galatasaray	Kuyt (81)		
381	25 October 2015	Süper Lig	Fenerbahçe	1–1	Galatasaray	Diego (37)	Olcan (83)	
382	13 April 2016	Süper Lig	Galatasaray	0–0	Fenerbahçe			
383	26 May 2016	Türkiye Kupası	Galatasaray	1–0	Fenerbahçe	Podolski (31)	-	
384	20 November 2016	Süper Lig	Fenerbahçe	2–0	Galatasaray	Van Persie (45, 78p)		
385	23 April 2017	Süper Lig	Galatasaray	0–1	Fenerbahçe		Souza (90)	
386	22 October 2017	Süper Lig	Galatasaray	0–0	Fenerbahçe			
387	17 March 2018	Süper Lig	Fenerbahçe	0–0	Galatasaray			
388	2 November 2018	Süper Lig	Galatasaray	2–2	Fenerbahçe	Donk (31), Linnes (49)	Valbuena (66), Jailson (72)	
389	14 April 2019	Süper Lig	Fenerbahçe	1–1	Galatasaray	Elmas (71)	Onyekuru (66)	
390	28 September 2019	Süper Lig	Galatasaray	0–0	Fenerbahçe			
391	23 February 2020	Süper Lig	Fenerbahçe	1–3	Galatasaray	Kruse (21p)	Donk (40), Falcao (80p), Onyekuru (90)	(Note: First Galatasaray victory in Fenerbahce's stadium since 1999.)
392	27 September 2020	Süper Lig	Galatasaray	0–0	Fenerbahçe			
393	6 February 2021	Süper Lig	Fenerbahçe	0–1	Galatasaray		Mohamed (54)	
394	21 November 2021	Süper Lig	Galatasaray	1–2	Fenerbahçe	Aktürkoğlu (16)	Özil (31), Crespo (90)	
395	10 April 2022	Süper Lig	Fenerbahçe	2–0	Galatasaray	Zajc (26), Dursun (68)		
396	8 January 2023	Süper Lig	Fenerbahçe	0–3	Galatasaray		Oliveira (32), Aktürkoğlu (78), Icardi (90)	
397	4 June 2023	Süper Lig	Galatasaray	3–0	Fenerbahçe	Zaniolo (28, 79), Icardi (71)		
398	24 December 2023	Süper Lig	Fenerbahçe	0–0	Galatasaray			
399	7 April 2024	Süper Kupa	Galatasaray	3–0	Fenerbahçe	Icardi (1)		(Note: In protest against recent refereeing decisions and a pitch invasion by Trabzonspor fans during the earlier Trabzonspor-Fenerbahce fixture on 17 March 2024, Fenerbahce fielded their youth side for the match. After the first minute, which saw a Galatasaray goal scored on the pitch by Mauro Icardi, Fenerbahce left the field in protest and was sanctioned with a forfeit with a 3–0 loss of the game.)
400	19 May 2024	Süper Lig	Galatasaray	0–1	Fenerbahçe	-	Söyüncü (71)	
401	21 September 2024	Süper Lig	Fenerbahçe	1–3	Galatasaray	Džeko (63p)	Torreira (20), Mertens (28), Sara (59)	
402	25 February 2025	Süper Lig	Galatasaray	0–0	Fenerbahçe			
403	2 April 2025	Türkiye Kupası	Fenerbahçe	1–2	Galatasaray	Szymanski (45)	Osimhen (10, 27p)	
404	1 December 2025	Süper Lig	Fenerbahçe	1–1	Galatasaray	Durán (90)	Sané (27)	
405	10 January 2026	Süper Kupa	Galatasaray	0–2	Fenerbahçe		Guendouzi (28), Oosterwolde (48)	
406	26 April 2026	Süper Lig	Galatasaray	3–0	Fenerbahçe	Osimhen (40), Yılmaz (67), Torreira (83)		
407	26 October 2026	Süper Lig	Galatasaray	2–1	Fenerbahçe	Osimhen (29, 44)	İrfan Can (62)	

== See also ==
- The Intercontinental Derby (women's football)
- Beşiktaş–Fenerbahçe rivalry
- Beşiktaş–Galatasaray rivalry
- The Intercontinental Derby (basketball)
- List of association football rivalries
- List of association football club rivalries in Europe
- Sports rivalry
- Big Three (Turkey)
