= List of Fenerbahçe S.K. football captains =

This is a list of all captains of the Fenerbahçe S.K.'s football wing and their honours.

== Captains ==
Period	Name	Trophies
1907–1908	Necip Okaner	
1908–1924	(Turkey) Galip Kulaksızoğlu	Istanbul Football League (5)
1924–1933	(Turkey) Zeki Rıza Sporel	Istanbul Football League (2), Istanbul Shield
1933–1942	(Turkey) Fikret Arıcan	Turkish Football Championship (2), Istanbul Football League (2), Istanbul Shield (3), National League (2)
1942–1951	(Turkey) Cihat Arman	Chancellor Cup (3), Turkish Football Championship, Istanbul Football League (3), Istanbul Football Cup, National League (4)
1951–1956	(Turkey) Fikret Kırcan	Istanbul Football League
1956–1963	(Turkey) Naci Erdem	Istanbul Football League (2), Turkish Super League (2)
1963–1968	(Turkey) Şeref Has	Turkish Super League (3), Turkish Cup, Balkans Cup, Atatürk Cup, President Cup, Spor-Toto Cup
1968–1970	(Turkey) Can Bartu	Turkish Super League, TSYD Cup
1970–1975	(Turkey) Ziya Şengül	Turkish Super League (2), Turkish Cup, President Cup (2), Chancellor Cup, TSYD Cup (2)
1975–1980	(Turkey) Cemil Turan	Turkish Super League, Turkish Cup, Chancellor Cup, TSYD Cup (4)
1980–1983	(Turkey) Alpaslan Eratlı	Turkish Super League, Turkish Cup, TSYD Cup, Fleet Cup (2)
1983–1985	(Turkey) Cem Pamiroğlu	Turkish Super League, President Cup (2), TSYD Cup, Fleet Cup (2)
1985–1987	(Turkey) Müjdat Yetkiner	TSYD Cup
1987–1988	(Turkey) Şenol Çorlu	Chancellor Cup
1988–1991	(Germany) Harald Schumacher (Note: First non-Turkish captain)	Turkish Super League, President Cup
1991–1992	(Turkey) Rıdvan Dilmen	Chancellor Cup
1992–1993	(Turkey) Müjdat Yetkiner	
1993–1996	(Turkey) Oğuz Çetin	Turkish Super League, TSYD Cup (2)
1996–2000	(Turkey) Rüştü Reçber	Atatürk Cup, Chancellor Cup
2000–2003	(Turkey) Ogün Temizkanoğlu	Turkish Super League
2003–2007	(Turkey) Ümit Özat	Turkish Super League (3)
2007–2012	(Brazil) Alex de Souza	Turkish Super League, Turkish Cup, Turkish Super Cup (2)
2012–2013	(Turkey) Volkan Demirel	Turkish Cup
2013–2015	(Turkey) Emre Belözoğlu	Turkish Super League, Turkish Super Cup
2015–2019	(Turkey) Volkan Demirel	
2019–2020	(Turkey) Emre Belözoğlu	
2020–2021	(Turkey) Gökhan Gönül	
2021–2022	(Germany) Mesut Özil	
2022–2023	(Turkey) Altay Bayındır	Turkish Cup
2023–2025	(Bosnia and Herzegovina) Edin Džeko	
2025	(Turkey) Mert Hakan Yandaş	
2025–	(Slovakia) Milan Škriniar	Turkish Super Cup
