= 1938–39 Galatasaray S.K. season =

Galatasaray
1938–39 season
- President: (Turkey) Sedat Ziya Kantoğlu (until 8 April 1939) (Turkey) Nazmi Nuri Köksal
- Manager: (Austria) Peter Tandler
- Stadium: Taksim Stadı
- Istanbul Lig: 3rd
- Milli Küme: 1st
- Istanbul Şildi: did not participate
- Top goalscorer: League: Bülent Ediz (9); All: Cemil Gürgen Erlertürk (17)
Home colours	Away colours

The 1938–39 season was Galatasaray SK's 35th in existence and the club's 27th consecutive season in the Istanbul Football League.

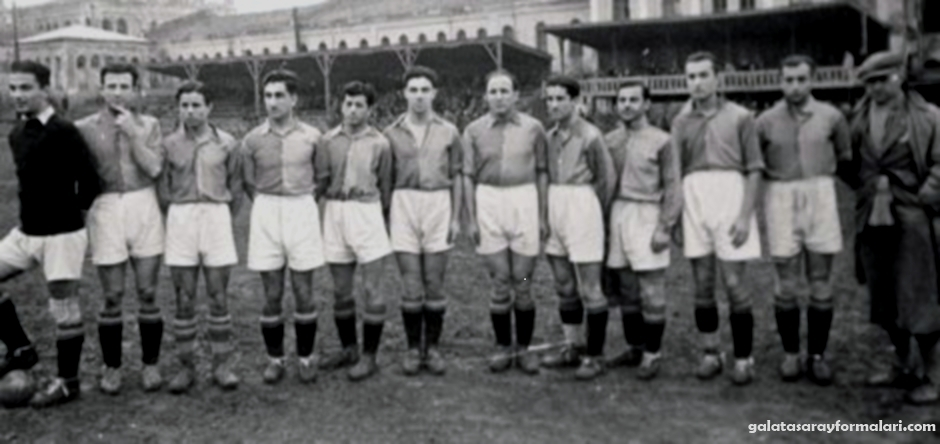
Galatasaray squad in 1939

== Squad statistics ==
No.	Pos.	Name	IFL		MKŞ		Total	
No.	Pos.	Name	Apps	Goals	Apps	Goals	Apps	Goals
-	GK	(Turkey) Fazıl Peker	4	0	0	0	4	0
-	GK	(Turkey) Osman İncili	7	0	13	0	20	0
-	GK	(Turkey) Sacit Öget	5	0	0	0	5	0
-	DF	(Turkey) Salim Şatıroğlu	7	8	1	0	7	8
-	DF	(Turkey) Lütfü Aksoy	16	0	1	0	17	0
-	DF	(Turkey) Faruk Barlas	0	0	11	0	11	0
-	DF	(Turkey) Adnan İncirmen	13	0	12	0	25	0
-	DF	(Turkey) Osman Alyanak	1	0	0	0	1	0
-	MF	(Turkey) Celal Kibarer	7	0	6	0	13	0
-	MF	(Turkey) Musa Sezer	11	0	13	1	24	1
-	MF	(Turkey) Yusuf Bahadır	0	0	10	0	10	0
-	MF	(Turkey) Ekrem Kapman	16	0	2	0	18	0
-	MF	(Turkey) Rıza Köprülü	0	0	6	0	6	0
-	FW	(Turkey) Murat Poyraz	0	0	4	0	4	0
-	FW	(Turkey) Danyal Vuran	1	0	0	0	1	0
-	FW	(Turkey) Mehmet Yılmaz	7	3	0	0	7	3
-	FW	(Turkey) Bülent Ediz	9	9	0	0	9	9
-	FW	(Turkey) Bedii Etingü	15	1	12	1	27	2
-	FW	(Turkey) Nubar Hamamcıyan	3	0	0	0	3	0
-	FW	(Turkey) Süleyman Tekil	12	6	3	2	15	8
-	FW	(Turkey) Boduri	5	1	13	11	18	12
-	FW	(Turkey) Necdet Cici	14	6	5	2	19	8
-	FW	(Turkey) Sarafim Madenli	4	2	10	4	14	6
-	FW	(Turkey) Eşfak Aykaç	8	3	0	0	8	3
-	FW	(Turkey) Selahattin Almay	3	1	12	5	15	9
-	FW	(Turkey) Sabri Gençay	2	0	0	0	2	0
-	FW	(Turkey) Cemil Gürgen Erlertürk	6	4	8	13	14	17

== Competitions ==
=== Istanbul Football Super League ===
==== Classification ====
Pos	Team	Pld	W	D	L	GF	GA	GD	Pts
1	Beşiktaş JK	18	15	3	0	69	15	+54	51
2	Fenerbahçe SK	18	14	3	1	81	13	+68	49
3	Galatasaray SK	18	11	5	2	52	20	+32	45
4	Vefa SK	18	10	3	5	39	24	+15	41
5	Beykoz 1908 S.K.D.	18	7	4	7	48	35	+13	36
6	Hilal SK	18	5	2	11	27	61	−34	30
7	Küçükçekmece SK	18	5	3	10	20	46	−26	29 (Note: 2 points deducted?)
8	Topkapı SK	18	4	0	14	19	73	−54	28 (Note: 2 bonus points?)
9	İstanbulspor	18	3	2	13	21	52	−31	23 (Note: 3 points deducted?)
10	Güneş SK	18	3	1	14	8	45	−37	11 (Note: 14 points deducted?)

==== Matches ====
Kick-off listed in local time (EEST)

2 October 1938 1	İstanbulspor	0–3	Galatasaray SK	Taksim Stadı, Istanbul
13:00		(Report)	Eşfak Aykaç 73'; Mehmet Yılmaz 85', 90'	Referee: Tarık Özerengin

9 October 1938 2	Topkapı SK	1–3	Galatasaray SK	Taksim Stadı, Istanbul
15:00	Kamil Girgin 43'	(Report)	Salim Şatıroğlu 22', 75'; Bülent Ediz 43'	Referee: Tarık Özerengin

16 October 1938 3	Küçükçekmece SK	0–1	Galatasaray SK	Taksim Stadı, Istanbul
15:00		(Report)	Süleyman Tekil 14'	Referee: Kemal Halim Gürgen

23 October 1938 4	Beşiktaş JK	5–2	Galatasaray SK	Şeref Stadı, Istanbul
15:00	Hakkı Yeten 29', 32', 64'; Sabri Gençsoy 47', 70'	(Report)	Eşfak Aykaç 56'; Salim Şatıroğlu 58'	Referee: Adnan Akın

30 October 1938 5	Güneş SK	0–3	Galatasaray SK
15:00	Güneş SK dissolved,	(Report)	thus Galatasaray were awarded a 3–0 win

6 November 1938 6	Vefa SK	3–3	Galatasaray SK	Taksim Stadı, Istanbul
15:00	Hüseyin Seyid 3'; Muhteşem Kural 25', 60'	(Report)	Süleyman Tekil 15'; Mehmet Yılmaz 34'; Bülent Ediz 41'	Referee: Tarık Özerengin

4 December 1938 7	Galatasaray SK	5-1	İstanbulspor	Taksim Stadı, Istanbul
15:00	Bülent Ediz 47', 52', 67', 80'; Salim Şatıroğlu 8'	(Report)	Kadir Tonba 49'	Referee: Necdet Gezen

11 December 1938 8	Galatasaray SK	5–0	Topkapı SK	Taksim Stadı, Istanbul
13:00	Süleyman Tekil 11', 28'; Necdet Cici 43'; Bülent Ediz 75'; Salim Şatıroğlu 78' p	(Report)		Referee: Adnan Akın

18 December 1938 9	Galatasaray SK	4–0	Küçükçekmece SK	Taksim Stadı, Istanbul
13:00	Salim Şatıroğlu 35' (pen.), 73'; Bülent Ediz 37'; Eşfak Aykaç 53'	(Report)		Referee: Adnan Akın

25 December 1938 10	Galatasaray SK	2–2	Beşiktaş JK	Taksim Stadı, Istanbul
15:00	Bülent Ediz 13'; Salim Şatıroğlu 59'	(Report)	Şeref Görkey 3', 40'	Referee: Adnan Akın

1 January 1939 11	Galatasaray SK	3–0	Güneş SK
	Güneş SK dissolved,	(Report)	thus Galatasaray were awarded a 3–0 win

8 January 1939 12	Galatasaray SK	1–0	Vefa SK	Taksim Stadı, Istanbul
15:00	Vahit 87' og	(Report)		Referee: Ahmet Adem Göğdün

15 January 1939 13	Hilal SK	1–1	Galatasaray SK	Taksim Stadı, Istanbul
11:30	Hakkı Rauf 3'	(Report)	Necdet Cici 44' p	Referee: Şazi Tezcan

22 January 1939 14	Galatasaray SK	3–1	Beykoz 1908 S.K.D.	Taksim Stadı, Istanbul
15:00	Boduri 30'; Cemil Gürgen Erlertürk 33'; Necdet Cici 75'	(Report)	Şahap Yengingüç 74'	Referee: Ahmet Adem Göğdün

29 January 1939 15	Fenerbahçe SK	3–2	Galatasaray SK	Fenerbahçe Stadı, Istanbul
15:00	Yaşar Yalçınpınar 7'; Esat Kaner 60', 79'	(Report)	Cemil Gürgen Erlertürk 3'; Necdet Cici 84' p	Referee: Tarık Özerengin

5 February 1939 16	Galatasaray SK	9–1	Hilal SK	Taksim Stadı, Istanbul
15:00	Sarafim Madenli 20', 29'; Selahattin Almay 24'; Cemil Gürgen Erlertürk 39', 83'; Necdet Cici 61', 67'; Süleyman Tekil 71'; Mehmet Salim 72' og	(Report)	Hakkı Rauf 88' p	Referee: Tarık Özerengin

12 February 1939 17	Beykoz 1908 S.K.D.	1–1	Galatasaray SK	Taksim Stadı, Istanbul
15:00	Bahadır Olcayto 25'	(Report)	Süleyman Tekil 18'	Referee: Refik Osman Top

19 February 1939 18	Galatasaray SK	1–1	Fenerbahçe SK	Taksim Stadı, Istanbul
15:00	Bedii Etingü 27'	(Report)	Ali Rıza Tansı 2'	Referee: Tarık Özerengin

=== Milli Küme Şampiyonası ===
==== Classification ====
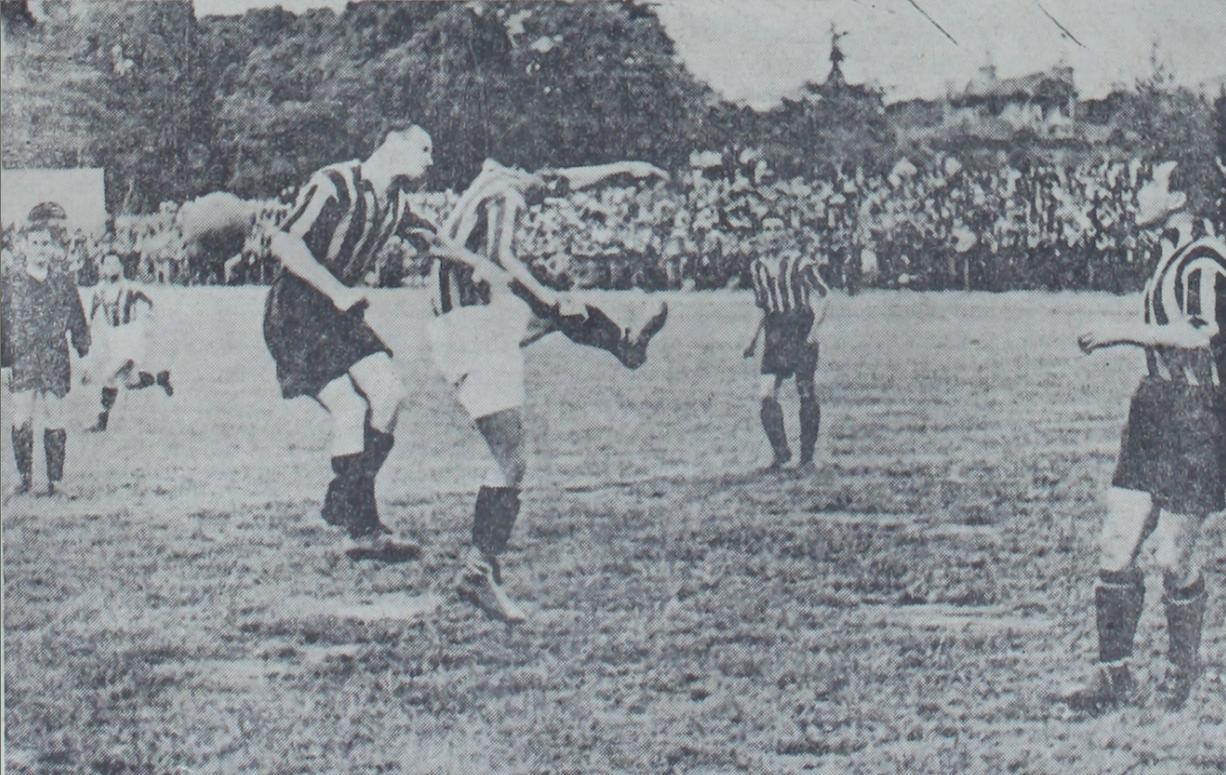
A view from the match between Galatasaray and Fenerbahçe on 21 May 1939.

Pos	Team	Pld	W	D	L	GF	GA	GAv	Pts
1	Galatasaray (Note: Galatasaray and Ankara Demirspor played in a championship playoff, but the result of this playoff was not used, and ultimately Galatasaray was awarded the championship based on goal average.)	14	11	0	3	43	19	2.263	35 (Note: 35 (not 36) points due to awarded games.)
2	Ankara Demirspor	14	9	3	2	35	16	2.188	35
3	AS-FA Gücü	14	9	1	4	34	21	1.619	33
4	Beşiktaş	14	8	2	4	37	17	2.176	32
5	Fenerbahçe	14	6	2	6	31	26	1.192	28
6	Vefa	14	3	2	9	28	36	0.778	22
7	Doğanspor	14	3	1	10	13	49	0.265	21
8	Ateşspor	14	1	1	12	9	43	0.209	17

Rules for classification: 3 points for a win, 2 points for a draw, and 1 points for a loss.

==== Matches ====
Kick-off listed in local time (EEST)

19 March 1939 1	Beşiktaş JK	3– 0	Galatasaray SK	Istanbul
16:30	3–0 awarded game	(Report)		Stadium: Taksim Stadı

1 April 1939 2	MKE Ankaragücü	4–1	Galatasaray SK	Ankara
17:00	Ali Rıza Arda 18'; Vahap Özaltay 46'; Fikret Arıcan 75'; Fahri Akay 83'	(Report)	Necdet Cici 87' (pen.)	Stadium: Ankara 19 Mayıs Stadium; Referee: unknown

2 April 1939 3	Ankara Demirspor	2–0	Galatasaray SK	Ankara
16:00	Orhan Barlas 55'; Zeki Tavacıoğlu 65'	(Report)		Stadium: Ankara 19 Mayıs Stadium; Attendance: 15, 000; Referee: unknown

23 April 1939 4	Galatasaray SK	4–1	Vefa SK	Istanbul
17:00	Selahattin Almay 30'; Sarafim Madenli 47'; Süleyman Tekil 57'; Necdet Cici 83'	(Report)	Hakkı Yeniat 33'	Stadium: Taksim Stadi; Referee: Refik Osman Top

29 April 1939 5	Galatasaray SK	2–1	Ankara Demirspor	Istanbul
16:30	Süleyman Tekil 10'; Sarafim Madenli 81'	(Report)	İskender Çınar 59'	Stadium: Taksim Stadi; Referee: Şazi Tezcan

7 May 1939 6	Galatasaray SK	2–1	MKE Ankaragücü	Istanbul
16:00	Boduri 9', 19'	(Report)	Hamdi Toptop 22' (pen.)	Stadium: Şeref Stadı; Referee: Tarık Özerengin

21 May 1939 7	Fenerbahçe SK	3–4	Galatasaray SK	Istanbul
16:30	Esat Kaner 7'; Naci Bastoncu 55'; Rebii Erkal 71'	(Report)	Cemil Gürgen Erlertürk 24', 30'; Boduri 55' (pen.); Selahattin Almay 85'	Stadium: Fenerbahçe Stadi; Attendance: 12,000; Referee: Tarık Özerengin

28 May 1939 8	Galatasaray SK	3–1	Beşiktaş JK	Istanbul
17:30	Boduri 15'; Selahattin Almay 47'; Cemil Gürgen Erlertürk 60'	(Report)	Şeref Görkey 73'	Stadium: Taksim Stadium; Attendance: 8,000; Referee: Nuri Bosut

4 June 1939 9	Galatasaray SK	4–3	Fenerbahçe SK	Istanbul
17:30	Boduri 5', 69'; Cemil Gürgen Erlertürk 19'; Musa Sezer 65'	(Report)	Esat Kaner 31', 33'; Basri Taşkavak 55'	Stadium: Taksim Stadi; Referee: Tarık Özerengin

10 June 1939 10	Ateş SK	2–7	Galatasaray SK	İzmir
17:00	Ferit 18' (pen.); İzzet 82'	(Report)	Cemil Gürgen Erlertürk 15', 36', 65'; Selahattin Almay 42', 55', 57', 74'	Stadium: Alsancak Stadi; Referee: Hasan Yanık

11 June 1939 11	Doğan SK	0–4	Galatasaray SK	İzmir
17:00		(Report)	Boduri 32', 78'; Selahattin Almay 43'; Fethi 71' (o.g.)	Stadium: Alsancak Stadi; Referee: Mustafa Bayra

18 June 1939 12	Galatasaray SK	7–0	Doğan SK	Istanbul
17:30	Boduri 30', 33'; Cemil Gürgen Erlertürk 45', 54', 56'; Bedii Etingü 67'; Sarafim Madenli 85'	(Report)		Stadium: Taksim Stadi; Referee: Adnan Akın

19 June 1939 13	Galatasaray SK	3–1	Ateş SK	Istanbul
17:30	Cemil Gürgen Erlertürk 24', 26', 34'	(Report)	Ferit 77'	Stadium: Taksim Stadi; Referee: Ahmet Adem Göğdün

1 July 1939 14	Vefa SK	0–2	Galatasaray SK	Istanbul
18:00		(Report)	Boduri 24' (pen.); Sarafim Madenli 51'	Stadium: Taksim Stadi; Referee: Feridun Kılıç

23 July 1939 15	Galatasaray SK	3–0	Ankara Demirspor	Istanbul
13:00	match has been cancelled	[ (Report)]		Stadium: Fenerbahçe Stadi; Attendance: 15,000; Referee: Tarık Özerengin

=== Friendly Matches ===
November 2, 1938 1	Unirea Tricolor București	1–3	Galatasaray SK	Istanbul
		[ (Report)]		Stadium: Taksim Stadı

January 1, 1939 1	Bucharest Team	2–0	Galatasaray SK	Istanbul
		[ (Report)]		Stadium: Taksim Stadı

==== Stadium Cup ====
Galatasaray SK won the cup on goal difference over Fenerbahçe SK.

1939	Galatasaray SK	3–1	Kurtuluş SK
				Referee: unknown

1939	Galatasaray SK	3–0	Şişli SK
				Referee: unknown

1939	Galatasaray SK	3–0	Beyoğluspor
				Referee: unknown

==== Tan Cup ====
Galatasaray SK won 2 cups beating Fenerbahçe SK twice.

1 May 1939	Galatasaray SK	4–1	Fenerbahçe SK
17:15	Sarafim Madenli 20', 46'; Süleyman Tekil 55'; Boduri 84'		Naci Bastoncu 36'	Referee: Nuri Boşut

24 September 1939	Galatasaray SK	4–0	Fenerbahçe SK
	Cemil Gürgen Erlertürk (?)			Referee: unknown
