= 1937–38 Galatasaray S.K. season =

Galatasaray
1937–38 season
- President: (Turkey) Saim Gogen (until 15 December 1937) (Turkey) Sedat Ziya Kantoğlu
- Manager: (Hungary) Peter Szabo
- Stadium: Taksim Stadı
- Istanbul Lig: 4th
- Milli Küme: 2nd
- Istanbul Şildi: did not participate after 2 matches
- Top goalscorer: League: Süleyman Tekil (9); Haşim Birkan (9); All: Haşim Birkan (17)
Home colours	Away colours

The 1937–38 season was Galatasaray SK's 34th in existence and the club's 26th consecutive season in the Istanbul Football League.

== Squad statistics ==
No.	Pos.	Name	IFL		MKŞ		IS		Total	
No.	Pos.	Name	Apps	Goals	Apps	Goals	Apps	Goals	Apps	Goals
-	GK	(Turkey) Sacit Öget	0	0	11	0	n/a	n/a	11	0
-	GK	(Turkey) Emin	0	0	1	0	n/a	n/a	1	0
-	GK	(Turkey) Hızır Hantal	4	0	0	0	n/a	n/a	4	0
-	GK	(Turkey) Necmi Ungan	5	0	0	0	n/a	n/a	5	0
-	DF	(Turkey) Lütfü Aksoy	0	0	5	0	n/a	n/a	5	0
-	DF	(Turkey) Salim Şatıroğlu	8	0	10	0	n/a	n/a	18	0
-	DF	(Turkey) Adnan İncirmen	1	0	8	0	n/a	n/a	9	0
-	DF	(Turkey) Reşat Erkal	0	0	5	0	n/a	n/a	5	0
-	DF	(Turkey) Turan Tuluy	0	0	1	0	n/a	n/a	1	0
-	MF	(Turkey) Hüseyin Şakir	3	0	0	0	n/a	n/a	3	0
-	MF	(Turkey) Mustafa Pekin	6	0	10	0	n/a	n/a	16	0
-	MF	(Turkey) Hicri Yüce	3	1	0	0	n/a	n/a	3	1
-	MF	(Turkey) Celal Kibarer	3	0	1	0	n/a	n/a	4	0
-	MF	(Turkey) Musa Sezer	0	0	7	0	n/a	n/a	7	0
-	MF	(Turkey) Halil Burnaz	0	0	2	0	n/a	n/a	2	0
-	MF	(Turkey) Suavi Atasagun (C)	6	0	8	0	n/a	n/a	14	0
-	FW	(Turkey) Necdet Cici	9	8	11	2	n/a	n/a	20	10
-	FW	(Turkey) Fazıl Özkaptan	8	0	1	0	n/a	n/a	9	0
-	FW	(Turkey) Bülent Ediz	9	7	12	3	n/a	n/a	21	10
-	FW	(Turkey) Eşfak Aykaç	7	0	8	1	n/a	n/a	15	1
-	FW	(Turkey) Selahattin Buda	0	0	1	0	n/a	n/a	1	0
-	FW	(Turkey) Süleyman Tekil	9	9	10	5	n/a	n/a	19	14
-	FW	(Turkey) Gündüz Kılıç	0	0	2	2	n/a	n/a	2	2
-	FW	(Turkey) Haşim Birkan	8	9	10	8	n/a	n/a	18	17
-	FW	(Turkey) Danyal Vuran	8	2	1	0	n/a	n/a	9	2
-	FW	(Turkey) Nubar Hamamcıyan	2	0	0	0	n/a	n/a	2	0
-	FW	(Turkey) Şefik Çakan	0	0	1	0	n/a	n/a	1	0
-	FW	(Turkey) Sabri Gençay	0	0	0	0	n/a	n/a	0	0
-	FW	(Turkey) Mehmet Yılmaz	0	0	6	1	n/a	n/a	6	1

== Squad changes for the 1937–38 season ==
In: Note: Flags indicate national team as defined under FIFA eligibility rules; some limited exceptions apply. Players may hold more than one non-FIFA nationality.

No.	Pos.	Nation	Player
-		TUR	Turan Tuluy (from Galatasaray High School)
-		TUR	Metin Kızılkaya (from Galatasaray High School)
-		TUR	Halil Burnaz (from Galatasaray High School)
-		TUR	Mustafa Pekin (from Galatasaray High School)
-		TUR	Nubar Hamamcıyan (from Şişli SK)
-		TUR	Mehmet Yılmaz (from Karadeniz SK)
-		TUR	Bedii Etingü (from Altınordu İdman Yurdu SK)
-		TUR	Necmi Ungan (from Galatasaray High School)
-		TUR	Musa Sezer (from Karagümrük SK)
-		TUR	Hızır Hantal (from Galatasaray B Team)
-		TUR	Zeki (from Galatasaray B Team)

== Competitions ==
=== Istanbul Football League ===
==== Classification ====
Pos	Team	Pld	W	D	L	GF	GA	GD	Pts
1	Güneş SK	9	6	2	1	31	8	+23	24 (Note: 1 bonus point?)
2	Fenerbahçe SK	9	7	1	1	40	11	+29	24
3	Beşiktaş JK	9	6	3	0	44	12	+32	24
4	Galatasaray SK	9	5	2	2	36	20	+16	21
5	Vefa SK	9	4	1	4	20	21	−1	18
6	Beykoz 1908 S.K.D.	9	3	3	3	13	16	−3	18
7	İstanbulspor	9	2	2	5	13	22	−9	15
8	Küçükçekmece SK	9	1	1	7	9	30	−21	12
9	Topkapı SK	9	1	1	7	9	36	−27	12
10	Eyüpspor	9	1	2	6	10	49	−39	12 (Note: 1 point deducted?)

==== Matches ====
Kick-off listed in local time (EEST)

7 November 1937 1	Topkapı SK	1–2	Galatasaray SK	Istanbul
13:00	Selahattin Kapsal 47'	(Report)	Necdet Cici 21' (pen.), 70'	Stadium: Taksim Stadı; Referee: Ahmet Adem Göğdün

14 November 1937 2	Galatasaray SK	8–1	Küçükçekmece SK	Istanbul
15:00	Haşim Birkan 19', 35', 71'; Bülent Ediz 23'; Süleyman Tekil 41', 73', 88'; Danyal Vuran 49'	(Report)	Hamdi Türkakar 80'	Stadium: Şeref Stadı; Referee: Basri Bütün

21 November 1937 3	Galatasaray SK	4–4	Beşiktaş JK	Istanbul
15:00	Necdet Cici 14' (pen.), 36'; Bülent Ediz 51'; Haşim Birkan 81'	(Report)	Şeref Görkey 40', 63'; Hakkı Yeten 60', 88'	Stadium: Fenerbahçe Stadı; Referee: Sami Açıköney

28 November 1937 4	İstanbulspor	1–4	Galatasaray SK	Istanbul
15:00	Sami Açıköney 7'	(Report)	Hicri Yüce 40'; Bülent Ediz 75'; Süleyman Tekil 77'; Necdet Cici 84'	Stadium: Taksim Stadı; Referee: Basri Bütün

5 December 1937 5	Galatasaray SK	4–1	Vefa SK	Istanbul
15:00	Necdet Cici 11'; Süleyman Tekil 19'; Haşim Birkan 25'; Bülent Ediz 62'	(Report)	Muhteşem Kural 76'p	Stadium: Taksim Stadı; Referee: Rüştü Erkuş

12 December 1937 6	Beykoz 1908 S.K.D.	1–1	Galatasaray SK	Istanbul
15:00	Bahadır Olcayto 84'p	(Report)	Süleyman Tekil 18'	Stadium: Taksim Stadı; Referee: Feridun Kılıç

19 December 1937 7	Güneş SK	6–0	Galatasaray SK	Istanbul
15:00	Murat Akıncı 11' (pen.), 43' (pen.); Selahattin Almay 52'; Melih Kotanca 60'; Rasih Minkari 75'; Rebii Erkal 79'	(Report)		Stadium: Taksim Stadı; Referee: Feridun Kılıç

26 December 1937 8	Galatasaray SK	11–2	Eyüpspor	Istanbul
15:00	Süleyman Tekil 15', 67', 76'; Bülent Ediz 22', 39', 70'; Haşim Birkan 55', 78', 81'; Danyal Vuran 58'p Necdet Cici 87'	(Report)	Ferdi Güngör 63'; Şükrü Tuğcu 74'	Stadium: Taksim Stadı; Referee: Ahmet Adem Göğdün

2 January 1938 9	Galatasaray SK	2–3	Fenerbahçe SK	Istanbul
15:00	Haşim Birkan 60'; Necdet Cic 79'p	(Report)	Bülent Büyükyüksel 21', 75'; Fikret Arıcan 84'	Stadium: Şeref Stadı; Referee: Rüştü Erkuş

=== İstanbul Shield ===
==== Matches ====
1938 1	İstanbulspor	2–5	Galatasaray SK	Istanbul
13:00		[ (Report)]		Stadium: Taksim Stadı

1938 1	Topkapı SK	2–3	Galatasaray SK	Istanbul
13:00		[(Report)]		Stadium: Taksim Stadı

=== Milli Küme ===
==== Classification ====
Pos	Team	Pld	W	D	L	GF	GA	GAv	Pts
1	Güneş	14	13	1	0	42	9	4.667	41
2	Beşiktaş	14	9	2	3	37	14	2.643	34
3	Galatasaray	14	8	0	6	28	29	0.966	30
4	Üçok	14	7	0	7	34	34	1.000	28
5	Muhafızgücü	14	5	2	7	23	30	0.767	26
6	Harp Okulu	14	5	1	8	22	24	0.917	25
7	Alsancak	14	4	0	10	19	37	0.514	21 (Note: 1 point deducted?)
8	Fenerbahçe	14	1	2	11	12	7	1.714	8 (Note: Withdrew from the competition)

Rules for classification: 3 points for a win, 2 points for a draw, and 1 points for a loss.

==== Matches ====
February 13, 1938 1	Galatasaray SK	1–2	Beşiktaş JK	Istanbul
13:00	Haşim Birkan 51'	(Report)	Şeref Görkey 40'; Hakkı Yeten 78'	Stadium: Taksim Stadı; Referee: Nuri Bosut

February 26, 1938 2	Muhafızgücü	2–3	Galatasaray SK	Ankara
15:00	Ali Rıza 22'; İbrahim Tezcan 35'	(Report)	Bülent Ediz 44'; Haşim Birkan 60', 63'	Stadium: 19 Mayıs Stadium; Referee: Kemal Halim Gürgen

February 27, 1938 3	Harbiye SK	0–1	Galatasaray SK	Ankara
15:00		(Report)	Süleyman Tekil 77'	Stadium: 19 Mayıs Stadium; Referee: Kemal Halim Gürgen

March 20, 1938 4	Galatasaray SK	0–7	Güneş SK	Istanbul
16:00		(Report)	Melih Kotanca 8', 55', 80', 85'; Selahattin Almay 24', 66'; Rasih Minkari 64'	Stadium: Taksim Stadium; Referee: Herlinder

March 26, 1938 5	Galatasaray SK	0–3	Harbiye SK	Istanbul
16:00		(Report)	Zeki Tavacıoğlu 35'; Habip Altay 50'; İzzet Barış 55'	Stadium: Taksim Stadium; Referee: Nuri Bosut

April 3, 1938 6	Galatasaray SK	3–1	Muhafızgücü	Istanbul
16:00	Bülent Ediz 17'; Haşim Birkan 59', 61'	(Report)	Hüsnü 34' (pen.)	Stadium: Taksim Stadium; Referee: Basri Bütün

May 1, 1938 7	Beşiktaş JK	1–2	Galatasaray SK	Istanbul
16:30	Hakkı Yeten 89'	(Report)	Haşim Birkan 48', 53'	Stadium: Şeref Stadi; Referee: Adnan Akın

May 14, 1938 8	Üçok SK	3–2	Galatasaray SK	İzmir
16:00	Sait Altınordu 26', 84', 88'	(Report)	Necdet Cici 17'; Süleyman Tekil 43'	Stadium: Alsancak Stadium; Referee: Esat Merter

May 15, 1938 9	Alsancak SK	3–2	Galatasaray SK	İzmir
16:30	Basri Taşkavak 2'; Cemil Gürgen Erlertürk 4'; Enver Arslanalp 86'	(Report)	Süleyman Tekil 24' (pen.); Haşim Birkan 27'	Stadium: Alsancak Stadium; Referee: Mustafa Bayra

May 22, 1938 10	Galatasaray SK	3–2	Alsancak SK	Istanbul
17:00	Bülent Ediz 60'; Gündüz Kılıç 67'; Eşfak Aykaç 74'	(Report)	Enver Arslanalp 51'; Doğan Tanal 72'	Stadium: Taksim Stadium; Referee: Tarık Özerengin

May 28, 1938 11	Galatasaray SK	3–1	Üçok SK	Istanbul
17:00	Süleyman Tekil 26', 69'; Gündüz Kılıç 65'	(Report)	Sait Altınordu 7'	Stadium: Taksim Stadium; Referee: Basri Bütün

June 5, 1938 12	Güneş SK	4–2	Galatasaray SK	Istanbul
17:00	Rebii Erkal 45'; Niyazi Öztunç 47', 69'; Selahattin Almay 53'	(Report)	Necdet Cici 51' (pen.); Mehmet Yılmaz 85'	Stadium: Taksim Stadium; Referee: Adnan Akın

=== Friendly Matches ===
7 December 1937 1	Unirea Tricolor București	0–0	Galatasaray SK	Istanbul
		[ (Report)]		Stadium: Taksim Stadı

6 February 1938 2	Yugoslavia FK	0–0	Galatasaray SK	Istanbul
		[ (Report)]		Stadium: Taksim Stadı

June 12, 1938 1	Galatasaray SK	1–3	Beogradski SK	Belgrad
		[ (Report)]

June 13, 1938 2	Galatasaray SK	0–4	Yugoslavia FK	Belgrad
		[ (Report)]

June 16, 1938 3	Galatasaray SK	0–4	SK Bata Borovo	Borovo Naselje
		[ (Report)]

June 25, 1938 3	Galatasaray SK	3–3	Panathinaikos / AEK Athens	Istanbul
		[ (Report)]		Stadium: Taksim Stadı
