= 1931–32 Galatasaray S.K. season =

Galatasaray
1931–32 season
- President: (Turkey) Tahir Kevkep (until 15 January 1932) (Turkey) Ali Haydar Barşal (until 19 February 1932) (Turkey) Ahmet Kara (until 11 March 1932) (Turkey) Fethi İsfendiyaroğlu
- Manager: (England) Fred Pegnam
- Stadium: Taksim Stadı
| Home colours | Away colours |

The 1931–32 season was Galatasaray SK's 28th in existence. Galatasaray SK did not join the Istanbul Football League due to the disagreement regarding the match revenues and played only friendly matches. Galatasaray SK's did not participate the İstanbul Shield Organization either.

== Friendly Matches ==
Kick-off listed in local time (EEST)

September 18, 1931

| Galatasaray SK | 4 – 3 | Beşiktaş JK |
|---|---|---|
| | Report |

Taksim Stadium, Istanbul
Referee: Unknown

October 6, 1931

| Beşiktaş JK | 0 – 0 | Galatasaray SK |
|---|---|---|
| | [Report] |

Taksim Stadium, Istanbul
Referee: Unknown

=== Kaideli Heykel ===
| 13 May 1932 FB Stadium opening match - Kaideli Heykel match | Fenerbahçe SK | 1–2 | Galatasaray SK | Istanbul |
| 17:00 | Alaattin Baydar 50' | | Mehmet Leblebi 25'; Rebii Erkal 50' | Stadium: Fenerbahçe Stadium; Referee: Edward Allen |

=== National Olympic Committee Cup ===
May 27, 1932

| Galatasaray SK | 0 – 1 | Fenerbahçe SK |

Taksim Stadium, Istanbul
Referee: Unknown
