= Niyazi Sel =

Turkish footballer

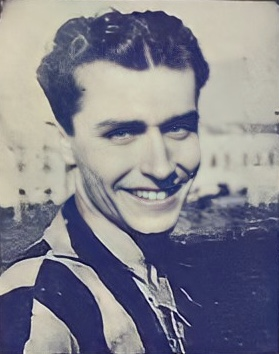

Personal information
- Date of birth: 12 March 1908
- Place of birth: Istanbul, Turkey
- Date of death: 1 January 1990 (aged 81)

International career
Years	Team	Apps	(Gls)
- Turkey

Niyazi Sel (12 March 1908 – 1 January 1990) was a Turkish footballer. He competed in the men's football tournament at the 1936 Summer Olympics.
