= Fikret Kırcan =

Turkish footballer (1919–2014)

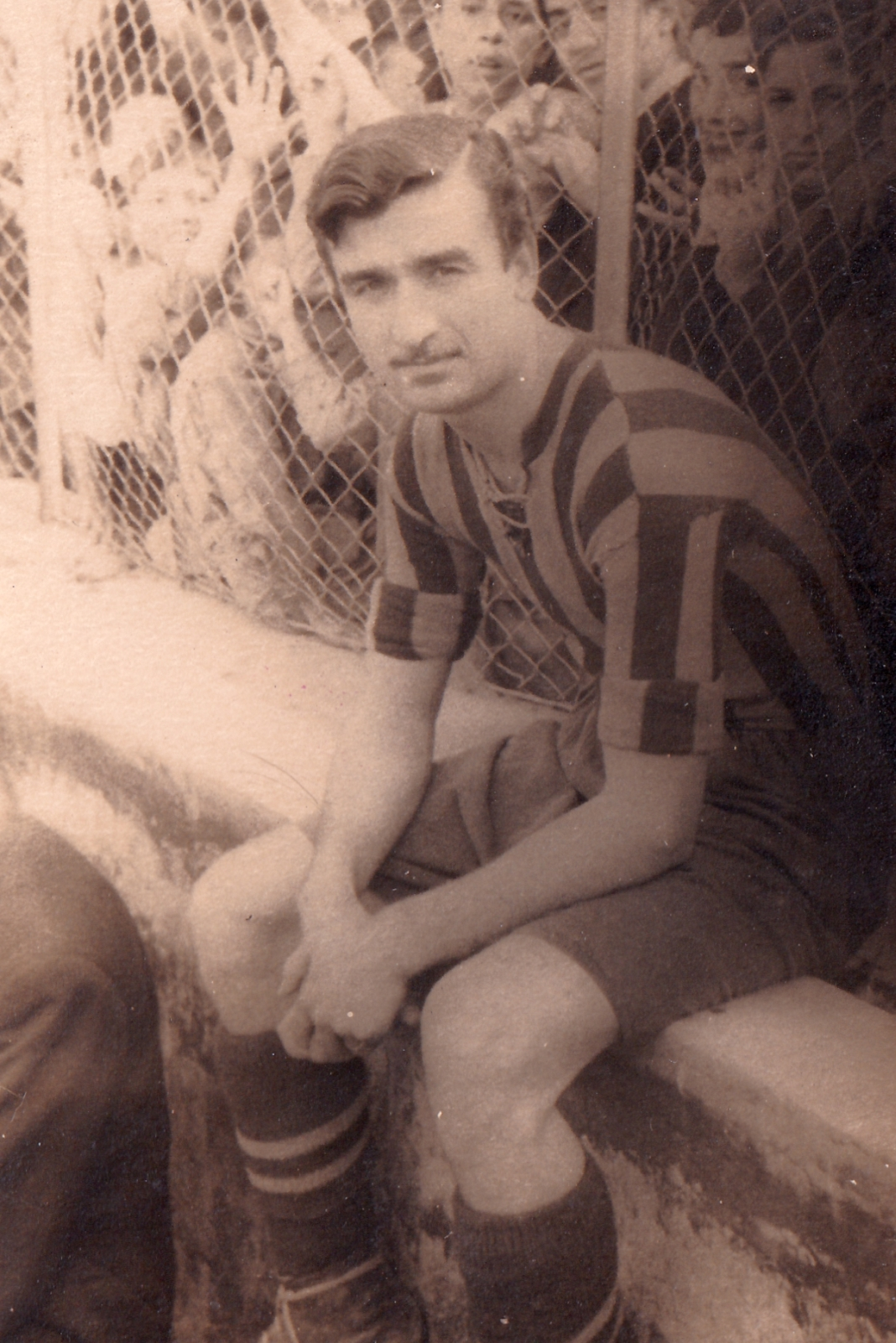

Personal information
- Date of birth: December 25, 1919
- Place of birth: Istanbul, Ottoman Empire
- Date of death: November 26, 2014 (aged 94)
- Place of death: Istanbul, Turkey
- Position: Midfielder

Senior career*
Years	Team	Apps	(Gls)
1934–1956	Fenerbahçe	412	(139)

International career
1948–1956	Turkey	12	(2)
- * Club domestic league appearances and goals

Fikret Kırcan (December 25, 1919 – November 26, 2014) was a Turkish footballer.

== Biography ==
Born in Istanbul, he took up football at the age of ten and joined Fenerbahçe S.K. in 1934 as a member of their junior team, remaining there through 1956. During this time the squad was champion (1935 and 1944) and runner-up (1940 and 1947) of the Amatör Futbol Şampiyonası twice, six time-champion (1937, 1940, 1943, 1945, 1946, and 1950) and twice runner-up (1944 and 1947) of the Milli Küme Şampiyonası, three-time winner (1945, 1946, and 1950) and once runner-up (1944) of the Chancellor Cup, seven-time victor (1935-1937, 1944, 1947, 1948, 1953) and ten-time runner up (1934, 1938-1941, 1943, 1945-1946, 1950, and 1956) in the Istanbul Football League, and four-time winner of (1934, 1938, 1939, and 1945) and twice-runner up for (1942 and 1944) the Istanbul Shield and its successor the Istanbul Futbol Kupası. He served as Fenerbahçe team captain from 1951 through 1956 and was capped 12 times with the Turkey national team, thrice as captain, and attended the football tournament at the 1948 Summer Olympics, where his nation made it to the quarter-finals before being eliminated by eventual silver medalists Yugoslavia.

Kırcan married at the age of 19 and attended law school for a short period, but was unable to keep up with his academic commitments and chose to continue his football career instead. Following his retirement he served in various administrative and executive capacities with Fenerbahçe S.K., including a stint as Technical Director during the 1968-1969 season. He died aged 94 in Istanbul on November 26, 2014.
