= Yaşar Mumcuoğlu =

Turkish footballer

Personal information
- Date of birth: 15 November 1942 (age 83)

International career
Years	Team	Apps	(Gls)
1965–1970	Turkey	5	(0)

Yaşar Mumcuoğlu (born 15 November 1942) is a Turkish footballer. He played in five matches for the Turkey national football team from 1965 to 1970.
