= Ferit =

Ferit is a Turkish spelling of the Arabic masculine given name Farid (Arabic: فَرِيد fariyd, farīd) meaning "unique, singular ("the One"), incomparable". The name is also found in Albania and Macedonia.

People named Ferit include:

- Ferit Hoxha (born 1967), Permanent Representative of Albania to the United Nations
- Ferit Melen (1906-1988), Turkish civil servant and politician
- Ferit Şahenk (born 1964), Turkish businessman
- Ferit Odman (born 1982), Turkish jazz musician
- Ali Ferit Gören (1913–1987), Austrian-Turkish Olympic sprinter
