= Alpaslan Eradlı =

Turkish footballer

Personal information
- Date of birth: 1948 (age 77–78)
- Place of birth: Istanbul, Turkey
- Position: Defender

Senior career*
Years	Team	Apps	(Gls)
1968–1973	İstanbulspor	118	(9)
1973–1983	Fenerbahçe	223	(17)
Total		341	(26)

International career
1970–1983	Turkey MNT	26	(1)
- * Club domestic league appearances and goals

Alpaslan Eradlı (born 1948) is former Turkish footballer. Between 1973 and 1983, he played for Fenerbahçe, and was the captain of the team (1980–1983). He played 414 matches for Fenerbahçe SK and scored 38 goals.

He started his career in amateur level with Istanbul based club Cerrahpaşa Spor Kulubü and then started in professional with İstanbulspor then transferred to Fenerbahçe. He also played 26 times for Turkey and 4 times for Turkey U21.

He was one of the best sweepers in Turkish football history. He ended his career in 1983.

== Honours ==
- Turkish Football League (4): 1973-74, 1974-75, 1977-78, 1982-83
- Turkish Cup (3): 1973-74, 1978–79, 1982–83
- Presidents Cup (2): 1973, 1975
- Chancellor Cup (1): 1979-80
- TSYD Cup (7): 1973–74, 1975–76, 1976–77, 1978–79, 1979–80, 1980–81, 1982–83
- Fleet Cup (2): 1982, 1983
