= Naci Erdem =

Turkish footballer (1931–2022)

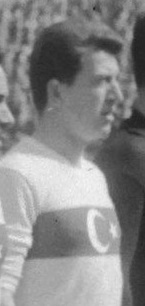
- Erdem in 1958

Personal information
- Date of birth: 28 January 1931
- Place of birth: Istanbul, Turkey
- Date of death: 28 March 2022 (aged 91)
- Place of death: Istanbul, Turkey
- Height: 1.77 m (5 ft 10 in)
- Position: Centre-back

Senior career*
Years	Team	Apps	(Gls)
1951–1953	Fatih Karagümrük		
1953–1963	Fenerbahçe	440	(46)
1963–1964	Beyoğluspor	17	(0)
1964–1966	Galatasaray	42	(0)
1966–1967	Edirnespor	14	(1)

International career
1954–1965	Turkey	34	(0)
- * Club domestic league appearances and goals

Naci Erdem (28 January 1931 – 28 March 2022) was a Turkish footballer who played as a centre-back. He was Fenerbahçe's fifth most capped footballer, with 605 caps.

He started his career with Fatih Karagümrük, and transferred from Havagücü in 1955.

Erdem played for Fenerbahçe between 1953–63. He was capped 605 times in Fenerbahçe history and scored 168 goals. He won four times Turkish League and once more with Galatasaray after being transferred there in 1964. He played 34 times for Turkey and he started as captain three times. Erdem played for Turkey at the 1954 FIFA World Cup.
