= Şeref Has =

Turkish footballer (1936–2019)

Personal information
- Date of birth: 27 September 1936
- Place of birth: Istanbul, Turkey
- Date of death: 13 June 2019 (aged 82)
- Height: 1.78 m (5 ft 10 in)
- Position: Midfielder

Senior career*
Years	Team	Apps	(Gls)
1954–1955	Beyoğlu S.K.	17	(4)
1955–1973	Fenerbahçe	320	(79)
1973–1975	Mersin İdmanyurdu	0	(0)

International career^{‡}
1954	Turkey U18	9	(0)
1957–1960	Turkey B	3	(0)
1956–1967	Turkey	39	(1)
- * Club domestic league appearances and goals as of 13 January 2018 ‡ National team caps and goals as of 13 January 2018

Şeref Has (27 September 1936 – 13 June 2019) was the third most capped Turkish football player in Fenerbahçe football history with 605 appearances. He played as a forward and midfielder and was especially known for his headed goals. At his career end he also played as defender.

== Professional career ==
Has transferred to Fenerbahçe from Beyoğluspor in 1955. He was one of the fan favourites when he was playing. He played for Fenerbahçe between 1955–69, scoring 168 goals. He won the Turkish League 4 times and the Istanbul League title twice.

== International career ==
Has played 37 times for Turkey, starting as captain 10 times.

== Personal life ==
Has' brother, Mehmet Ali Has, was also a Turkish professional footballer.
