= Alaattin Baydar =

Turkish footballer (1901–1990)

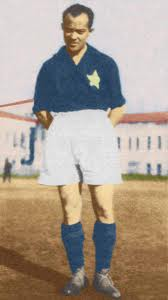

Personal information
- Date of birth: 1901
- Place of birth: Istanbul, Turkey
- Date of death: 13 July 1990 (aged 88–89)
- Position: Forward

Senior career*
Years	Team	Apps	(Gls)
1916–1934	Fenerbahçe	324	(362)

International career
1923–1928	Turkey	16	(1)
- * Club domestic league appearances and goals

Alaattin Baydar (1901 – 13 July 1990) was a Turkish footballer who played for Fenerbahçe. Born in Istanbul, he played as a right winger and right forward and was known as Alâ. He was the younger brother of Nasuhi Baydar, who was a founding member of Fenerbahçe.

He played 18 years for Fenerbahçe between 1916 and 1934. He is ranked third in Fenerbahçe history with 362 goals in 324 matches, he also scored 24 goals in 39 matches against Galatasaray. He won the 1920–21, 1922–23 Istanbul League Championships as a player, he furthermore won the 1963–64 and 1964-65 Turkish League Championships as a president. He was a member of the General Harrington Cup squad.

He was a member of the first Turkey national football team that played against Romania on 26 October 1923. He played 16 times for the national team. He was included in the national squads that competed in the 1924 Summer Olympics and 1928 Summer Olympics.
