= Lütfü Aksoy =

Turkish footballer (1911–1998)

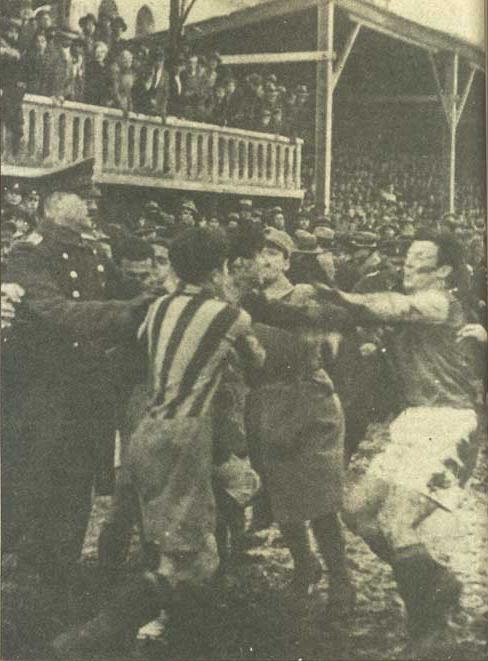
- Lütfü Aksoy (1934, on the right)

Personal information
- Date of birth: 17 July 1911
- Place of birth: Istanbul, Turkey
- Date of death: 5 September 1998 (aged 87)
- Place of death: Istanbul, Turkey

International career
Years	Team	Apps	(Gls)
- Turkey

Lütfü Aksoy (17 July 1911 – 5 September 1998) was a Turkish footballer. He competed in the men's tournament at the 1936 Summer Olympics.
