= Necdet Cici =

Turkish footballer

Personal information
- Date of birth: 26 June 1912
- Date of death: 14 August 1995 (aged 83)
- Position: Midfielder

International career
Years	Team	Apps	(Gls)
1932	Turkey	1	(0)

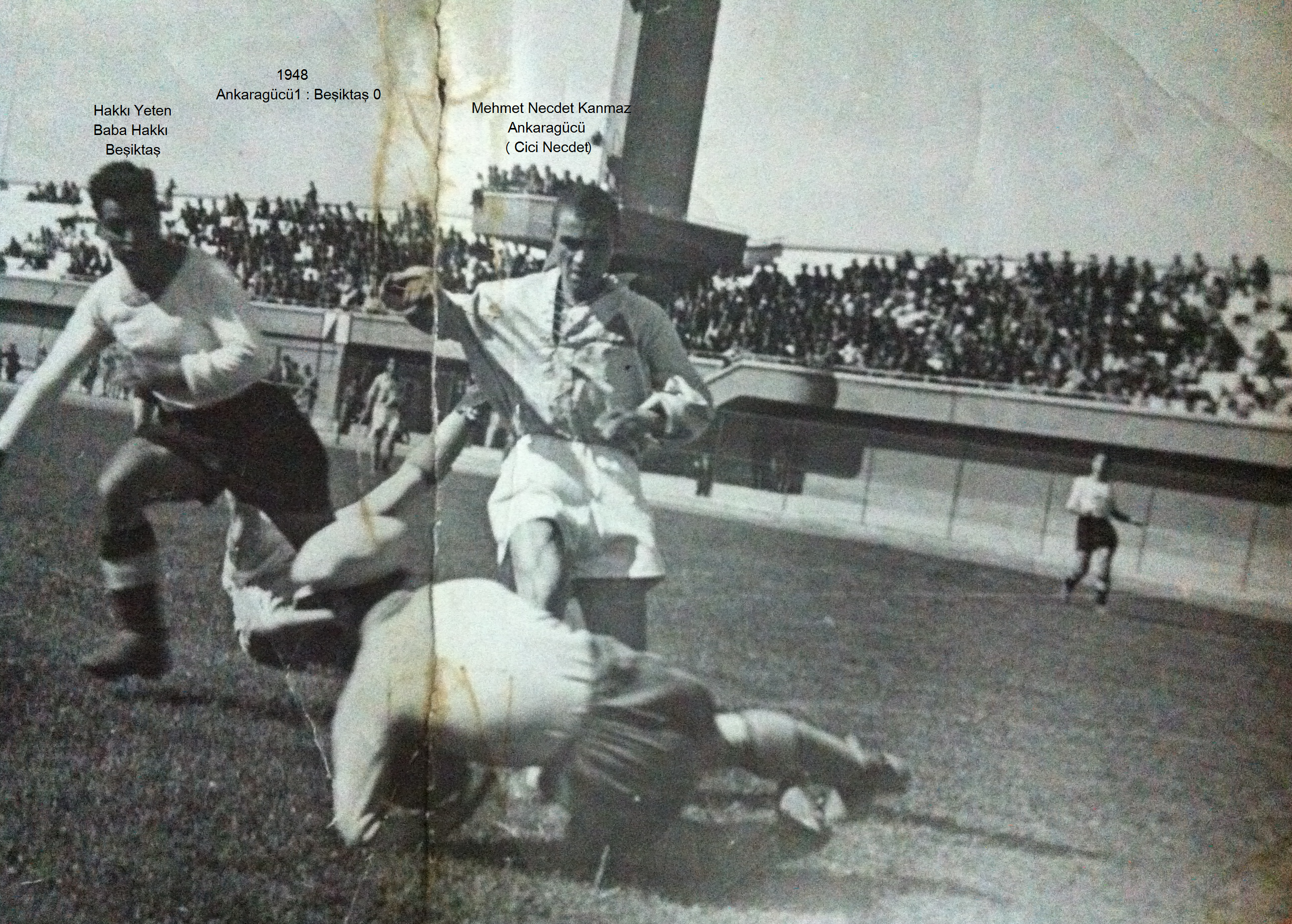
Cici Necdet

Necdet Cici (26 June 1912 – 14 August 1995) was a Turkish footballer. He played in one match for the Turkey national football team in 1932. He was also part of Turkey's squad for the football tournament at the 1936 Summer Olympics, but he did not play in any matches.
