= Fikret Arıcan =

Turkish footballer and chairman

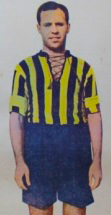
Fikret Arıcan

Fikret Arıcan (17 July 1911 – 25 May 1993) was a footballer and chairman of the Turkish sports club Fenerbahçe SK between 1984 and 1986. He was regarded as one of the best Turkish football players of the pre-war era.

He was born in Istanbul, Turkey. He started his football career with Fenerbahçe when he was 12. He also managed the football team twice between 1945 and 1947 and in 1955. Fikret Arıcan played eight times for the Turkey national team between 1931 and 1937 and scored two goals. He was also part of Turkey's squad at the 1936 Summer Olympics.
