= Rebii Erkal =

Turkish footballer and manager

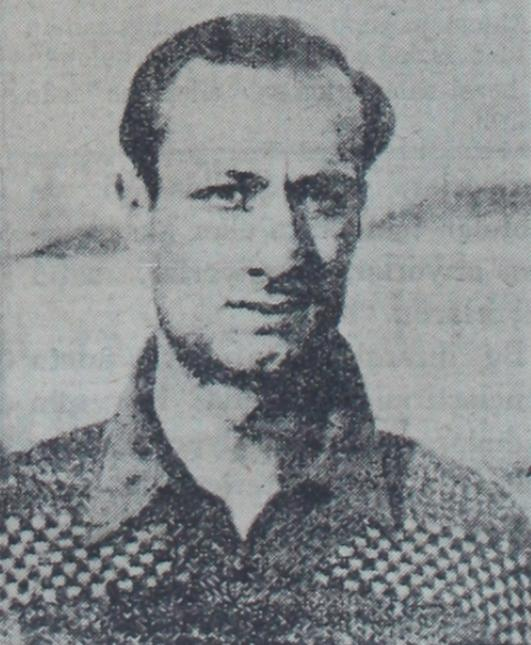
Rebii Erkal

Rebii Erkal (10 February 1911 – 25 November 1985) was a Turkish footballer and manager. He was born in Istanbul.

Erkal played for Galatasaray SK his whole career, making him memorable for many Gala supporters. He was also part of Turkey's squad at the 1936 Summer Olympics. In 1951, after his active playing career ended, he became the manager of the Turkey national football team. Under Erkal's charge, the national squad managed to defeat the Germany national football team 2-1 in Berlin.

== Career statistics ==
=== International goals ===
#	Date	Venue	Opponent	Score	Result	Competition
1.	19 June 1931	Vasil Levski National Stadium, Sofia, Bulgaria	Yugoslavia	0-2	Win	Balkan Cup
Correct as of 10 February 2010.
