= Istanbul Shield =

Turkish football tournament (1930–1939)

The Istanbul Shield (Turkish: İstanbul Şildi) was a football tournament for Istanbul clubs in Turkey which was organised between 1930 and 1939. At the beginning it was decided that the club which would win the most titles during the nine-year span would be the final owner of the shield. The final match between Galatasaray and Fenerbahçe in 1931 was not played. In 1932, Fenerbahçe, Galatasaray and Beşiktaş did not participate and İstanbulspor won the shield. In 1933 the semi-final game was cancelled due to the abusive behavior of Fenerbahçe fans when their team was leading 2–0. Galatasaray won the repeated game by 1–0. The tournament was later re-organized under the name Istanbul Football Cup (İstanbul Kupası in Turkish).

Since Fenerbahçe won the title a record four times, they became the final owners of the shield, which is exhibited in the museum of the club until today.

== Winners ==
Year	Winners (number of titles)	Score	Runners-up
1929–30	Fenerbahçe (1)	2–1	Beşiktaş
1930–31	Fenerbahçe (1)	Final match cancelled	Galatasaray
1931–32	İstanbulspor (1)	2–1	Vefa
1932–33	Galatasaray (1)	1–0	Fenerbahçe
1933–34	Fenerbahçe (2)	2–1	Beşiktaş
1934–35	Beşiktaş (1)	2–1	Beykoz 1908
1935–36	not held		
1936–37	not held		
1937–38	Fenerbahçe (3)	3–1	Beşiktaş
1938–39	Fenerbahçe (4)	7–3	Hilal
