= 1961–62 Turkish National League =

4th season of top-tier Turkish football

Turkish National League
- Season: 1961–62
- Champions: Galatasaray; 1st title
- Relegated: none
- European Cup: Galatasaray
- Inter-Cities Fairs Cup: Altay
- Balkans Cup: Fenerbahçe; Beşiktaş
- Matches played: 380
- Goals scored: 857 (2.26 per match)
- Top goalscorer: Fikri Elma (22 goals)
- Biggest away win: Beykoz 0–6 Beşiktaş

The 1961–62 Turkish National League was the fourth season of professional football in Turkey. The league consisted of 20 clubs, with Galatasaray winning their first title.

== Overview ==
Galatasaray won their first league title after previously finishing second place two times and third in 1959–60. The club qualified for the European Cup, while runners-up Fenerbahçe qualified for the Balkans Cup. Beşiktaş rounded out the top-three, while Altay were the other European representative, earning qualification to the Inter-Cities Fairs Cup. Fikri Elma of finished top scorer of the league, scoring 22 of Ankara Demirspor's 42 goals as they finished last in the league.

Hacettepe and Beyoğluspor were promoted to the 1962–63 Milli Lig, while no clubs were relegated. Before the start of the season, it was decided only one club would be promoted from the Baraj Games in order to cut down the number of competing clubs from 20 to 18. However, after the Baraj Games, cities boycotted for their clubs to remain in the Milli Lig, and Prime Minister İsmet İnönü asked the Turkish Football Federation to allow these clubs to compete. The TFF allowed for five clubs – three already participating and two promoted from the regional leagues – to compete in the 1962–63 season. The TFF decided to create a second division the following season.

== Final league table ==
Pos	Team	Pld	W	D	L	GF	GA	GR	Pts	Qualification
1	Galatasaray (C)	38	23	11	4	52	18	2.889	57	Qualification to European Cup preliminary round
2	Fenerbahçe	38	23	7	8	64	30	2.133	53	Invitation to Balkans Cup
3	Beşiktaş	38	16	16	6	48	24	2.000	48	Invitation to Balkans Cup
4	Altay	38	18	10	10	44	35	1.257	46	Invitation to Inter-Cities Fairs Cup first round
5	Karşıyaka	38	17	8	13	46	51	0.902	42	
6	Gençlerbirliği	38	16	9	13	57	47	1.213	41	
7	Göztepe	38	12	17	9	46	42	1.095	41	
8	Altınordu	38	14	13	11	48	53	0.906	41	
9	Kasımpaşa	38	12	15	11	44	41	1.073	39	
10	PTT	38	11	14	13	45	50	0.900	36	
11	MKE Ankaragücü	38	11	13	14	45	39	1.154	35	
12	Feriköy	38	10	14	14	31	36	0.861	34	
13	İstanbulspor	38	9	16	13	36	42	0.857	34	
14	Beykoz	38	9	15	14	43	52	0.827	33	
15	Karagümrük	38	10	12	16	38	45	0.844	32	
16	Yesildirek	38	10	12	16	40	53	0.755	32	
17	İzmirspor	38	9	14	15	32	44	0.727	32	
18	Vefa	38	11	9	18	29	48	0.604	31	Qualification to Baraj Games
19	Ankara Demirspor	38	9	12	17	42	52	0.808	30	Qualification to Baraj Games
20	Şeker Hilal	38	6	11	21	27	55	0.491	23	Qualification to Baraj Games

(C) Champions

== Results ==
Home \ Away	ALT	ATO	AND	AGÜ	BJK	BYK	FNB	FER	GAL	GEN	GÖZ	İST	İZM	FKG	KSK	KAS	PTT	ŞKR	VEF	YEŞ
Altay		1–1	1–0	1–1	0–1	2–1	3–1	1–1	0–0	2–0	2–1	1–1	1–0	1–0	1–0	1–0	1–1	3–0	3–0	1–0
Altınordu	1–0		5–2	1–1	1–0	1–0	2–1	2–0	1–5	0–3	2–0	2–1	1–1	0–0	3–3	1–0	2–1	4–2	3–0	1–1
Ankara Demirspor	2–2	4–0		0–3	1–3	4–2	1–3	1–1	1–2	1–2	2–2	1–1	1–1	0–1	0–1	1–0	2–0	1–1	1–0	2–2
MKE Ankaragücü	3–1	2–1	0–0		0–2	0–1	0–1	0–0	0–2	1–2	1–2	0–0	4–1	1–1	4–0	1–1	2–0	5–0	3–2	3–1
Beşiktaş	1–0	4–0	1–1	1–1		1–0	1–0	1–0	1–1	0–0	2–1	1–1	4–0	2–2	0–1	1–0	0–0	2–0	2–0	1–1
Beykoz	0–1	1–1	1–2	0–0	0–6		0–0	0–0	0–3	0–3	2–2	3–1	3–2	0–0	4–0	2–2	3–3	2–2	0–0	2–1
Fenerbahçe	0–0	3–0	3–1	3–0	0–2	2–1		2–0	1–0	1–1	5–1	1–0	2–2	2–1	4–0	4–3	4–0	0–1	3–1	2–0
Feriköy	1–0	1–1	1–0	0–2	2–2	0–0	0–2		0–0	1–2	0–2	2–0	2–0	1–1	3–2	2–0	0–0	1–1	0–1	2–1
Galatasaray	2–1	2–0	2–0	1–0	0–0	2–0	1–0	1–0		4–1	0–2	1–0	1–0	0–0	1–2	2–1	2–0	2–0	1–0	0–0
Gençlerbirliği	1–2	4–1	1–1	2–1	1–2	2–1	1–1	0–0	0–1		0–1	0–1	1–0	2–0	3–1	1–2	2–0	1–1	4–1	3–1
Göztepe	0–2	0–0	1–1	0–0	1–1	2–2	0–1	2–0	1–1	3–2		0–0	0–1	0–0	2–0	1–3	2–1	2–0	1–1	5–2
İstanbulspor	5–0	1–2	1–0	1–0	1–1	0–0	0–2	2–1	1–4	2–4	0–0		1–2	0–0	1–0	1–1	2–1	1–1	1–0	2–3
İzmirspor	0–0	0–0	1–0	3–1	0–0	1–1	1–2	1–0	1–1	0–1	1–2	0–0		4–1	0–0	0–1	3–1	0–0	3–0	0–0
Karagümrük	0–1	1–1	1–0	2–0	1–0	0–2	0–1	1–1	2–3	2–1	1–1	1–1	1–2		0–1	3–2	1–2	0–1	3–0	1–0
Karşıyaka	3–3	2–2	1–0	1–0	1–0	2–0	1–0	0–2	1–0	4–1	2–2	2–1	2–0	3–2		1–2	2–1	1–1	2–1	2–0
Kasımpaşa	2–0	1–0	1–0	2–2	0–0	1–1	2–3	0–2	0–0	2–2	1–1	1–0	3–0	4–3	1–1		1–1	2–0	1–0	1–3
PTT	2–3	1–0	3–3	1–1	0–0	1–0	2–2	2–1	0–0	1–1	1–1	2–2	3–0	1–0	3–1	1–1		2–1	2–0	2–0
Şekerhilâl	1–2	1–3	1–2	1–2	1–0	0–1	0–2	1–1	0–1	2–1	0–1	0–0	0–0	0–1	2–0	0–2	1–2		2–0	1–1
Vefa	1–0	2–1	0–2	1–0	3–0	1–2	1–0	2–1	1–1	1–1	3–1	1–1	0–0	2–1	0–0	0–0	1–0	1–0		1–1
Yeşildirek	1–0	1–1	0–1	0–0	2–2	1–5	0–0	0–1	0–2	2–0	2–1	1–2	3–1	2–3	1–0	0–0	2–1	3–1	1–0	

Source: TFF, Mackolik
Legend: Blue = home team win; Yellow = draw; Red = away team win.

== Baraj Games ==
Pos	Team	Pld	W	D	L	GF	GA	GR	Pts	Promotion or relegation
1	Hacettepe	5	4	1	0	9	4	2.250	9	Promoted to the Milli Lig
2	Ankara Demirspor	5	3	2	0	14	4	3.500	8	Remain in the Milli Lig
3	Şeker Hilal	5	2	1	2	5	5	1.000	5	Remain in the Milli Lig
4	Vefa	5	1	2	2	5	2	2.500	4	Remain in the Milli Lig
5	Beyoğluspor	5	1	2	2	2	7	0.286	4	Promoted to the Milli Lig
6	İzmir Demirspor	5	0	0	5	1	18	0.056	0	Relegated to Regional League
