= 1963–64 in Turkish football =

The 1963–64 season was the 60th season of competitive football in Turkey.

== Overview ==
Fenerbahçe won their third top-flight title and Beşiktaş finished runners-up for the second time. Şeker won the first edition of the 2.Lig. Galatasaray won their second Turkish Cup in a row, with Altay finishing runners-up. The Turkish Football Federation claimed that the result of the Karşıyaka and Kasımpaşa match, which originally finished as a 4–0 win for Karşıyaka, was fixed beforehand. As a result, the TFF changed the win to a 0–3 loss for Karşıyaka. The change dropped Karsiyaka into the relegation zone, and they were relegated to the 2.Lig. Karşıyaka challenged the decision, and took the TFF to civil court. Two years later, the civil court overturned the TFF's ruling, and Karşıyaka were allowed to join the 1.Lig again in 1966–67.

The 2.Lig was created at the beginning of this season. The club consisted of thirteen clubs: four clubs relegated during the 1962–63 season (Karagümrük, Şeker, Vefa, and Yeşildirek), the top two clubs from each of the Ankara, Istanbul, and İzmir professional leagues (Altındağ and Güneşspor (Ankara), Beylerbeyi and Sarıyer (Istanbul), İzmir Demirspor and Ülküspor). Adana Demirspor, Bursaspor, and Mersin İdmanyurdu also joined. The first placed team gained promotion to the 1.Lig, while the last placed team was relegated to their respective professional or amateur league.

Galatasaray reached the first round of the 1963–64 European Cup after beating Ferencvárosi TC in the preliminary round. They were knocked out by FC Zürich, who won a coin toss after the two sides drew their match. Fenerbahçe took Galatasaray's spot in the 1963–64 European Cup Winners' Cup because they had already qualified for the European Cup through their league finish. Fenerbahçe reached the quarter-finals, ultimately losing to Hungarian side MTK Budapest 0–1 in the third leg playoff match. Beşiktaş placed last in Group A of the 1963–64 Balkans Cup.

== Awards ==
- Gol Kralı (Goal King)
  - Güven Önüt (Beşiktaş) – 19 goals

== Honours ==
Competition	Winner	Runners-up
1.Lig	Fenerbahçe (3)	Beşiktaş (2)
2.Lig	Şeker (1)	Adana Demirspor (1)
Turkish Cup	Galatasaray (2)	Altay (1)

== European qualification ==
Competition	Qualifiers	Reason for qualification
European Cup	Fenerbahçe	1st in 1.Lig
Balkans Cup	Beşiktaş	2nd in 1.Lig
European Cup Winners' Cup	Galatasaray	Türkiye Kupası winners
Inter-Cities Fairs Cup	Göztepe	5th in 1.Lig

== Final league tables ==
=== 1.Lig ===
Pos	Team	Pld	W	D	L	GF	GA	±	Pts	Notes
1	Fenerbahçe	34	21	11	2	55	14	+41	53	European Cup
2	Beşiktaş	34	22	8	4	57	19	+38	52	Balkans Cup
3	Galatasaray	34	16	10	8	49	27	+22	42	European Cup Winners' Cup; 1.815
4	Ankaragücü	34	17	8	9	52	38	+14	42	1.368
5	Göztepe	34	14	12	8	39	31	+8	40	Inter-Cities Fairs Cup
6	İstanbulspor	34	13	10	11	42	36	+6	36	
7	Altay	34	9	15	10	31	31	0	33	1.000
8	Feriköy	34	11	11	12	29	30	−1	33	0.967
9	Gençlerbirliği	34	9	15	10	28	38	−10	33	0.737
10	Ankara Demirspor	34	11	9	14	43	37	+6	31	1.162
11	PTT	34	8	15	11	25	31	−6	31	0.806
12	Altınordu	34	9	12	13	28	38	−10	30	
13	İzmirspor	34	8	12	14	28	35	−7	28	0.800
14	Hacettepe	34	9	10	15	26	42	−16	28	0.619
15	Beykoz	34	8	11	15	25	33	−8	27	
16	Karşıyaka	34	10	6	18	28	53	−25	25	Relegation to the 2.Lig
17	Beyoğluspor	34	5	14	15	26	40	−14	24	Relegation to the 2.Lig
18	Kasımpaşa	34	6	9	19	16	61	−45	21	Relegation to the 2.Lig

=== 2.Lig ===
Pos	Team	Pld	W	D	L	GF	GA	±	Pts	Notes
1	Şeker	24	18	4	2	45	10	+35	40	Promotion to the 1.Lig
2	Adana Demirspor	24	17	4	3	30	10	+20	38	
3	Beylerbeyi	24	9	7	8	25	24	+1	25	1.042
4	Vefa	24	9	7	8	27	28	−1	25	0.964
5	Mersin İdmanyurdu	24	10	5	9	29	32	−3	25	0.906
6	Ülküspor	24	9	6	9	21	25	−4	24	
7	Sarıyer	24	6	10	8	21	23	−2	22	0.913
8	Bursaspor	24	7	8	9	21	27	−6	22	0.778
9	Karagümrük	24	7	7	10	31	29	+2	21	
10	Yeşildirek	24	7	6	11	26	31	−5	20	
11	Güneşspor	24	7	4	13	30	36	−6	18	
12	Altındağ	24	5	6	13	17	29	−12	16	0.586
13	İzmir Demirspor	24	6	4	14	26	45	−19	16	Relegation to the İzmir Professional League; 0.578

== Türkiye Kupası final ==
First leg

1964-06-21

Altay	0–0	Galatasaray
	(Report)

İzmir Alsancak Stadium, İzmir
Referee: Gerhard Schulenburg (FRG)

Second leg

1964-06-29

Galatasaray	w/o (3–0)	Altay
	(Report)

Mithatpaşa Stadyumu, Istanbul
Referee: Nicolae Mihăilescu (Romania)

1964 Türkiye Kupası winners
Galatasaray
Second title

== National team ==
The Turkey national football team competed in three matches during the 1963–64 season. Their record was zero wins, two draws, and one loss.

22 September 1963	Poland	0–0	Turkey	Poznań

28 September 1963	West Germany	3–0	Turkey	Frankfurt
	Seeler 52', 56', 66' (pen.)

9 October 1963	Turkey	0–0	Romania	Ankara
