= 1958–59 in Turkish football =

The 1958–59 season was the 54th season of competitive football in Turkey.

== Overview ==
The Milli Lig was introduced in 1959. At the time, there were three cities who had professional leagues: Ankara, Istanbul, and İzmir. The first league was made up of sixteen clubs, with eight from Istanbul, and four each from Ankara and İzmir. To gain entry, qualification tournaments were held in 1958 to decide who would participate in the league. League play did not start until the second half of the season, causing the season to be played in group format and a shorter game schedule.

The first final was held between Fenerbahçe S.K. and Galatasaray S.K. The match was a two legged knockout. Galatasaray won the first match 1-0, while Fenerbahçe won the second 4-0 and secured their first title by 4-1 aggregate.

This year was also earmarked by the first competition of a Turkish club in the European Cup. Fenerbahçe won the first match of the preliminary round 4-3 on aggregate over Csepel SC. Their second preliminary match came against OGC Nice. Fenerbahçe had tied after two legs, but lost the playoff leg 1-5.

== Awards ==
- Top scorer
  - Metin Oktay (Galatasaray S.K.) - 11 goals

== Honours ==
Competition	Winner	Runners-up
Milli Lig	Fenerbahçe (1)	Galatasaray
Adana Professional League	Adana Demirspor (15)	
Ankara Professional League	Ankara Demirspor (5)	Ankaragücü (4)
Eskişehir Regional League	Eskişehir Demirspor (20)	
Istanbul Professional League	Fenerbahçe (15)	Galatasaray (11)
İzmir Professional League	Karşıyaka (3)	Altay (2)
Kayseri Regional League	Sümerspor (14)	
Trabzon Regional League	Idmanocağı (17)	

Notes = Number in parentheses is the times that club has won that honour.

== Final National league tables ==
Pos	Team	Pld	W	D	L	GF	GA	GD	Pts	Qualification
1	Galatasaray	14	7	6	1	18	7	+11	20	Qualification to Championship final
2	Vefa	14	7	6	1	21	10	+11	20	
3	Ankara Demirspor	14	4	8	2	12	11	+1	16	
4	Göztepe	14	5	5	4	23	21	+2	15	
5	Karagümrük	14	4	4	6	17	17	0	12	
6	Karşıyaka	14	2	6	6	13	21	−8	10	
7	Gençlerbirliği	14	1	8	5	10	18	−8	10	
8	Adalet	14	1	7	6	12	21	−9	9	

Rules for classification: 1) points; 2) goal difference; 3) number of goals scored.

=== Results ===
Home \ Away	ADA	ADS	GAL	GEN	GÖZ	KAG	KRŞ	VEF
Adalet		0–0	0–1	2–3	0–0	0–0	0–0	1–1
Ankara Demirspor	2–1		0–2	0–0	1–1	0–0	1–0	1–1
Galatasaray	2–1	1–2		0–0	5–0	1–0	1–1	0–0
Gençlerbirliği	1–1	0–0	0–0		2–2	1–2	1–1	0–3
Göztepe	2–3	4–2	0–0	2–1		3–0	3–2	0–1
Karagümrük	3–0	1–2	2–3	1–0	1–1		2–2	1–2
Karşıyaka	3–1	1–1	0–1	1–1	1–1	0–3		2–0
Vefa	2–2	0–0	1–1	3–0	3–2	1–0	3–0	

Legend: Blue = home team win; Yellow = draw; Red = away team win.

== White group ==
=== Table ===
Pos	Team	Pld	W	D	L	GF	GA	GD	Pts	Qualification
1	Fenerbahçe	14	12	2	0	29	7	+22	26	Qualification to Championship final
2	Beşiktaş	14	8	2	4	22	16	+6	18	
3	Altay	14	5	5	4	18	16	+2	15	
4	İzmirspor	14	4	5	5	11	12	−1	13	
5	MKE Ankaragücü	14	5	3	6	16	19	−3	13	
6	Hacettepe	14	5	1	8	14	20	−6	11	
7	Beykoz	14	3	4	7	17	21	−4	10	
8	İstanbulspor	14	1	4	9	6	22	−16	6	

Rules for classification: 1) points; 2) goal difference; 3) number of goals scored.

=== Promotions ===
Four clubs were promoted through a promotion tournament called the Federasyon Kupası. This brought the league club total up to 20 for the 1959–60 season. The four clubs were Kasımpaşa S.K., Şeker Hilal, Altınordu S.K., and Feriköy G.K. There were no relegations.

== National team ==
The Turkey national football team competed in six matches during the 1958-59 season. The team finished with a record of two wins, three draws, and one loss. Lefter Küçükandonyadis finished top scorer with two goals in six matches.

26 October 1958

Belgium	1–1	Turkey
Piters 58'		Metin 79'

Heysel Stadium, Brussels

2 November 1958

Romania	3–0	Turkey
Oaidă 62'; Constantin 77'; Dinulescu 81'		-

Stadionul 23 August, Bucharest

7 December 1958

Turkey	0–0	Bulgaria
-		-

19 Mayıs Stadium, Ankara

18 December 1958

Turkey	1–0	Czechoslovakia
Şeref 77'		-

Mithat Paşa Stadium, Istanbul

26 April 1959

Turkey	2–0	Romania
Lefter 13' (pen.), 54'		-

Mithat Paşa Stadium, Istanbul

10 May 1959

Turkey	0–0	Netherlands
-		-

Mithat Paşa Stadium, Istanbul
