= 1957–58 Beşiktaş J.K. season =

Beşiktaş J.K.
1957–58 season
- President: (Turkey) Nuri Togay
- Manager: (Italy) Leandro Remondini
- Istanbul Football League: 4th
- Turkish Federation Cup: Winner
- European Cup: Disqualified

The 1957–58 season was the 55th year of the club's existence. They played in the Turkish Federation Cup for the cup's second year (It would also be the last). They won it by defeating Galatasaray 2–0 on aggregate, in a two legged final. By winning the tournament, Beşiktaş qualified for the 1958–59 European Cup. Beşiktaş won the cup last year and qualified for the 1957–58 European Cup, but the Turkish Football Federation did not send their names to the draw so they were disqualified. In the Istanbul Football League, Beşiktaş finished 4th, behind Galatasaray, Fenerbahçe and İstanbulspor.

== Istanbul Football League ==
In the 1957–58 season of the Istanbul Football League, Beşiktaş finished 4th.

Pos	Team	Pld	W	D	L	GF	GA	GD	Pts
2	Fenerbahçe SK	18	12	3	3	39	13	+26	27
3	İstanbulspor	18	9	5	4	22	14	+8	23
4	Beşiktaş J.K.	18	9	4	5	34	18	+16	22
5	Vefa S.K.	18	7	3	8	23	28	−5	17
6	Kasımpaşa S.K.	18	5	4	9	19	28	−9	14

== Turkish Federation Cup ==
Beşiktaş competed in the Federation Cup for a second time. The professional national league at the time.

=== First round ===
Beşiktaş (Turkey)	8–2	(Turkey) Feriköy	Istanbul, Turkey
			Stadium: Dolmabahçe Stadium

=== Second round ===
Beşiktaş (Turkey)	1–0	(Turkey) Yeşildirek	Istanbul, Turkey
			Stadium: Dolmabahçe Stadium

=== Third round ===
Gençlerbirliği (Turkey)	2–1	(Turkey) Beşiktaş	Ankara, Turkey
			Stadium: Ankara 19 Mayıs Stadium

Beşiktaş (Turkey)	4–1	(Turkey) Gençlerbirliği	Istanbul, Turkey
			Stadium: BJK İnönü Stadium

Beşiktaş won 5-3 on aggregate.

=== Group stage ===
Pos	Team	Pld	W	D	L	GF	GA	GD	Pts	BJK	İST	ADS	BYK
1	Beşiktaş	6	5	0	1	14	5	+9	10		4–2	4–1	4–1
2	İstanbulspor	6	3	0	3	9	8	+1	6	0–1		3–1	3–1
3	Ankara Demirspor	6	3	0	3	6	11	−5	6	1–0	1–0		0–3
4	Beykoz	6	1	0	5	6	11	−5	2	0–1	0–1	1–2	

Source: rsssf.com

Beşiktaş (Turkey)	4–2	(Turkey) İstanbulspor	Istanbul, Turkey
			Stadium: Dolmabahçe Stadium

Ankara Demirspor (Turkey)	1–0	(Turkey) Beşiktaş	Ankara, Turkey
			Stadium: Ankara 19 Mayıs Stadium

Beşiktaş (Turkey)	4–1	(Turkey) Beykoz 1908	Istanbul, Turkey
			Stadium: Dolmabahçe Stadium

İstanbulspor (Turkey)	0–1	(Turkey) Beşiktaş	Istanbul, Turkey
			Stadium: Dolmabahçe Stadium

Beşiktaş (Turkey)	4–1	(Turkey) Ankara Demirspor	Istanbul, Turkey
			Stadium: Dolmabahçe Stadium

Beykoz 1908 (Turkey)	0–1	(Turkey) Beşiktaş	Istanbul, Turkey
			Stadium: Dolmabahçe Stadium

By finishing 1st, Beşiktaş qualified for the final.

=== Final ===
Galatasaray (Turkey)	0–1	(Turkey) Beşiktaş	Istanbul, Turkey
	report	Recep Adanır 47' (pen)	Stadium: Dolmabahçe Stadium; Attendance: 20,000; Referee: Rudolf Roman (Austria)

Beşiktaş (Turkey)	1–0	(Turkey) Galatasaray	Istanbul, Turkey
Coşkun Taş 42'	report		Stadium: Dolmabahçe Stadium; Attendance: 20,000; Referee: Rudolf Roman (Austria)

Beşiktaş won 2-0 on aggregate.
