= 1960–61 Turkish National League =

3rd season of top-tier Turkish football

Turkish National League
- Season: 1960–61
- Champions: Fenerbahçe; 2nd title
- Relegated: Adana Demirspor
- European Cup: Fenerbahçe
- Matches played: 380
- Goals scored: 850 (2.24 per match)
- Top goalscorer: Metin Oktay (36 goals)

The 1960–61 Turkish National League was the third season of professional football in Turkey. The league consisted of 20 clubs, with Fenerbahçe winning their second title.

== Overview ==
Fenerbahçe won their second Milli Lig title after edging out rivals Galatasaray by one point. The previous years champion, Beşiktaş, finished in third. Fenerbahçe were the lone Turkish representatives at the 1961–62 European Cup, as Turkey did not send a team to the Inter-Cities Fairs Cup, and there was no cup competition held to send winners to the European Cup Winners' Cup. Metin Oktay finished top scorer for the third time in a row, scoring 36 goals, his highest tally to date.

The season marked the first time a club from outside of Ankara, Istanbul or İzmir competed; Adana Demirspor earned promotion to the league the previous season. Their stay did not last long, as they were relegated back to the Adana Regional League after finishing bottom of the table and finishing 4th in the Baraj Games. Adana Demirspor were the only club to be relegated and Yeşildirek were the only club to be promoted.

== Final league table ==
Pos	Team	Pld	W	D	L	GF	GA	GR	Pts	Qualification
1	Fenerbahçe (C)	38	26	9	3	81	29	2.793	61	Qualification to European Cup first round and invitation to Balkans Cup
2	Galatasaray	38	27	6	5	75	19	3.947	60	Invitation to Balkans Cup
3	Beşiktaş	38	22	11	5	61	26	2.346	55	
4	Beykoz	38	17	15	6	51	34	1.500	49	
5	Gençlerbirliği	38	16	13	9	54	39	1.385	45	
6	Vefa	38	13	15	10	32	39	0.821	41	
7	İzmirspor	38	11	16	11	34	34	1.000	38	
8	Ankara Demirspor	38	12	14	12	37	41	0.902	38	
9	Karagümrük	38	12	11	15	48	48	1.000	35	
10	Feriköy	38	11	13	14	32	36	0.889	35	
11	MKE Ankaragücü	38	10	14	14	44	47	0.936	34	
12	Kasımpaşa	38	10	14	14	27	35	0.771	34	
13	Göztepe	38	12	10	16	40	53	0.755	34	
14	İstanbulspor	38	11	11	16	42	54	0.778	33	
15	Şeker Hilal	38	9	14	15	33	53	0.623	32	
16	Karşıyaka	38	10	11	17	45	50	0.900	31	
17	PTT	38	8	15	15	32	46	0.696	31	
18	Altay	38	8	14	16	30	46	0.652	30	Qualification to Baraj Games
19	Altınordu	38	5	16	17	17	31	0.548	26	Qualification to Baraj Games
20	Adana Demirspor	38	3	12	23	21	66	0.318	18	Qualification to Baraj Games

(C) Champions

== Results ==
Home \ Away	ADS	ALT	ATO	AND	AGÜ	BJK	BYK	FNB	FER	GAL	GEN	GÖZ	İST	İZM	FKG	KSK	KAS	PTT	ŞKR	VEF
Adana Demirspor		1–3	2–2	1–2	0–4	0–2	1–1	0–2	1–1	2–2	1–5	2–1	2–3	0–2	0–2	0–0	1–0	0–0	1–1	1–2
Altay	2–1		0–3	0–0	3–0	0–0	0–1	0–1	1–0	0–0	0–1	0–1	2–1	1–0	2–2	1–0	0–0	0–0	0–1	1–1
Altınordu	1–1	1–1		1–1	1–1	0–1	0–3	0–0	2–2	0–3	0–1	0–1	3–1	1–1	1–1	2–1	0–1	2–1	2–0	0–0
Ankara Demirspor	2–0	0–0	2–0		4–3	0–1	3–1	2–2	1–3	0–2	1–1	1–0	2–0	1–1	2–1	0–0	0–0	1–0	0–0	0–1
MKE Ankaragücü	1–0	3–0	3–0	0–0		1–1	2–3	1–3	0–1	1–0	1–1	0–0	2–2	1–1	1–4	1–0	0–0	3–2	1–1	2–1
Beşiktaş	3–0	2–1	3–1	2–1	2–1		0–2	0–1	0–0	2–0	1–1	3–1	3–0	4–2	1–1	2–0	1–1	4–2	4–0	3–0
Beykoz	3–0	3–1	0–0	0–1	2–1	0–0		0–0	1–0	0–0	2–0	0–0	2–2	3–0	3–1	2–1	3–2	1–0	1–1	1–2
Fenerbahçe	5–0	1–1	4–0	2–0	1–0	1–3	5–2		1–0	0–5	3–3	3–1	6–2	3–0	2–0	3–1	3–0	2–1	3–0	3–0
Feriköy	0–0	4–1	0–0	1–0	2–2	0–0	0–3	0–1		0–1	1–1	2–1	1–0	0–0	2–1	2–1	1–0	0–0	5–1	0–0
Galatasaray	2–0	4–0	3–3	1–0	2–1	1–0	5–0	2–1	2–0		1–0	4–0	2–0	3–1	3–0	2–0	1–0	1–0	5–0	2–0
Gençlerbirliği	1–0	1–0	1–0	4–1	1–0	1–1	0–0	1–1	3–1	3–0		2–2	3–1	1–1	4–1	0–1	1–0	2–2	1–0	2–1
Göztepe	2–0	2–2	1–0	3–1	1–1	0–3	3–2	0–1	3–1	1–3	2–1		3–1	1–0	2–1	0–0	1–3	1–1	0–0	0–1
İstanbulspor	1–2	2–0	1–0	1–2	0–1	0–0	0–2	2–2	1–0	1–0	2–2	2–1		1–1	0–0	0–2	1–0	1–1	1–0	3–0
İzmirspor	0–0	1–0	2–0	1–1	1–1	0–0	0–0	0–0	1–0	2–1	0–0	1–2	1–0		0–0	0–0	1–2	4–0	1–0	0–1
Karagümrük	3–0	1–1	2–1	1–0	1–0	1–2	0–0	0–1	3–0	0–0	2–1	2–0	1–4	1–2		2–0	1–2	3–1	1–1	3–0
Karşıyaka	1–1	1–0	3–3	2–3	1–1	3–1	0–0	1–7	4–0	0–1	3–0	6–2	2–1	0–2	3–1		1–1	0–1	3–0	0–2
Kasımpaşa	1–0	1–2	0–0	0–0	2–0	0–3	0–1	0–3	0–0	0–0	0–1	1–3	1–1	2–3	1–1	1–0		0–1	1–1	1–1
PTT	2–0	1–1	1–0	0–0	2–2	0–1	1–1	0–1	0–2	1–3	1–0	1–1	1–1	2–1	3–2	1–0	0–1		1–3	0–0
Şekerhilâl	1–0	2–2	3–0	3–0	0–1	3–0	1–1	0–2	0–0	0–6	2–1	1–0	0–1	0–0	1–0	3–3	1–2	1–1		0–1
Vefa	0–0	2–1	1–1	2–2	1–0	0–2	1–1	1–1	1–0	0–2	3–2	1–0	1–1	1–0	1–1	1–1	0–1	0–0	1–1	

Source: TFF, Mackolik
Legend: Blue = home team win; Yellow = draw; Red = away team win.

== Baraj Games ==
Pos	Team	Pld	W	D	L	GF	GA	GR	Pts	Promotion or relegation
1	Altay	5	3	1	1	5	1	5.000	7	Remain in the Milli Lig
2	Altınordu	5	3	1	1	8	5	1.600	7	Remain in the Milli Lig
3	Yeşildirek	5	3	1	1	8	5	1.600	7	Promoted to the Milli Lig
4	Adana Demirspor	5	2	0	3	6	7	0.857	4	Relegated to Regional League
5	Toprakspor	5	1	2	2	5	6	0.833	4	Remain in Regional League
6	Kültürspor	5	0	1	4	5	13	0.385	1	Remain in Regional League
