= İzmir derby =

Turkey Football matches

- Location: İzmir, Turkey
- Teams: Göztepe; Karşıyaka
- Latest meeting: Göztepe 2–0 Karşıyaka (10 April 2016)
- Next meeting: -
- Stadiums: İzmir Atatürk Stadium; Alsancak Stadium

Statistics
- Most wins: Equal (23)
- Largest victory: Göztepe 2–6 Karşıyaka (Süper Lig); Karşıyaka 4–0 Göztepe (First League - 2 times); Göztepe 3–0 Karşıyaka (Süper Lig - 2 times)

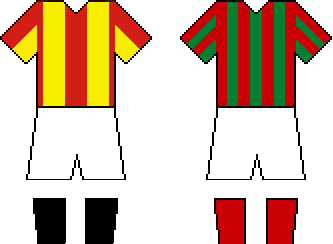
Göztepe SK vs Karsiyaka SK

İzmir derbisi (transl. Izmir derby) is the name given to football matches between Göztepe and Karşıyaka S.K., both of them from İzmir, Turkey. When the two teams played on May 16, 1981, while pursuing the Turkish Second Division title, the game attracted an audience of 80,000 people. The Guinness Book of World Records recognizes this milestone as a world record for a Second Division football game and The Guardian published an article named "The biggest non-top-flight attendance ever" including this match.

== Honours ==
Competition	Göztepe	Karşıyaka
Turkish Cup	2	0
Turkish Super Cup	1	0
Turkish Football Championship	1	0
İzmir Football League	5	3
TSYD İzmir Cup	9	8
Total	18	11

== All Time Statistics ==
As of 10 April 2016

	Matches	Wins Göztepe	Draws	Wins Karşıyaka	Goals Göztepe	Goals Karşıyaka
Super League Matches	18	8	5	5	23	20
First League Matches	26	8	5	13	22	38
Milli Küme Matches	2	2	0	0	6	2
İzmir League Matches	8	2	3	3	11	12
Turkish Cup Matches	5	3	0	2	5	3
Total matches	59	23	13	23	67	75

== All Matches ==
Göztepe vs. Karşıyaka
Season	Date	Competition	Home team	Score	Away team
1943–44	12–03–1944	Milli Küme	Göztepe	3–1	Karşıyaka
1943–44	14–05–1944	Milli Küme	Karşıyaka	1–3	Göztepe
1955–56	09–10–1955	İzmir Ligi	Karşıyaka	3–2	Göztepe
1955–56	10–06–1956	İzmir Ligi	Göztepe	3–0	Karşıyaka
1956–57	22–12–1956	İzmir Ligi	Göztepe	2–1	Karşıyaka
1956–57	16–03–1957	İzmir Ligi	Karşıyaka	2–2	Göztepe
1957–58	22–09–1957	İzmir Ligi	Karşıyaka	2–1	Göztepe
1957–58	01–02–1958	İzmir Ligi	Göztepe	1–1	Karşıyaka
1958–59	28–09–1958	İzmir Ligi	Göztepe	0–3	Karşıyaka
1958–59	28–12–1958	İzmir Ligi	Karşıyaka	0–0	Göztepe
1959	08–03–1959	Süper Lig	Göztepe	3–2	Karşıyaka
1959	19–04–1959	Süper Lig	Karşıyaka	0–3	Göztepe
1959–60	06–09–1959	Süper Lig	Göztepe	1–0	Karşıyaka
1959–60	09–04–1960	Süper Lig	Karşıyaka	1–1	Göztepe
1960–61	17–09–1960	Süper Lig	Karşıyaka	0–0	Göztepe
1960–61	05–03–1961	Süper Lig	Göztepe	2–6	Karşıyaka
1961–62	05–11–1961	Süper Lig	Karşıyaka	2–2	Göztepe
1961–62	24–02–1962	Süper Lig	Göztepe	2–0	Karşıyaka
1962–63	04–11–1962	Süper Lig	Karşıyaka	1–0	Göztepe
1962–63	02–03–1963	Süper Lig	Göztepe	1–2	Karşıyaka
1963–64	24–08–1963	Süper Lig	Göztepe	1–0	Karşıyaka
1963–64	19–01–1964	Süper Lig	Karşıyaka	1–1	Göztepe
1965–66	05–01–1966	Turkish Cup	Göztepe	3–1	Karşıyaka
1966–67	27–11–1966	Süper Lig	Karşıyaka	0–1	Göztepe
1966–67	15–04–1967	Süper Lig	Göztepe	1–2	Karşıyaka
1970–71	27–09–1970	Süper Lig	Göztepe	1–0	Karşıyaka
1970–71	20–02–1971	Süper Lig	Karşıyaka	0–2	Göztepe
1971–72	28–08–1971	Süper Lig	Karşıyaka	0–0	Göztepe
1971–72	27–02–1972	Süper Lig	Göztepe	1–3	Karşıyaka
1977–78	12–10–1977	Turkish Cup	Karşıyaka	2–1	Göztepe
1980–81	06–12–1980	First League	Göztepe	0–1	Karşıyaka
1980–81	16–05–1981	First League	Karşıyaka	0–0	Göztepe
1982–83	27–11–1982	First League	Karşıyaka	0–1	Göztepe
1982–83	24–04–1983	First League	Göztepe	0–2	Karşıyaka
1983–84	30–10–1983	First League	Göztepe	1–1	Karşıyaka
1983–84	08–04–1984	First League	Karşıyaka	1–0	Göztepe
1985–86	27–11–1985	Turkish Cup	Karşıyaka	0–0 (5–3)	Göztepe
1985–86	15–12–1985	First League	Göztepe	1–3	Karşıyaka
1985–86	11–05–1986	First League	Karşıyaka	2–3	Göztepe
1986–87	05–11–1986	Turkish Cup	Karşıyaka	0–1	Göztepe
1986–87	09–11–1986	First League	Göztepe	0–2	Karşıyaka
1986–87	18–04–1987	First League	Karşıyaka	4–0	Göztepe
1991–92	21–09–1991	First League	Karşıyaka	0–1	Göztepe
1991–92	16–02–1992	First League	Göztepe	0–4	Karşıyaka
1994–95	24–09–1994	First League	Göztepe	1–2	Karşıyaka
1994–95	26–11–1995	First League	Karşıyaka	2–1	Göztepe
1996–97	07–09–1996	First League	Göztepe	2–1	Karşıyaka
1996–97	02–10–1996	Turkish Cup	Karşıyaka	0–0 (4–5)	Göztepe
1996–97	10–11–1996	First League	Karşıyaka	1–1	Göztepe
2000–01	03–09–2000	First League	Karşıyaka	0–1	Göztepe
2000–01	01–11–2000	First League	Göztepe	0–0	Karşıyaka
2003–04	07–09–2003	First League	Göztepe	1–0	Karşıyaka
2003–04	08–02–2004	First League	Karşıyaka	5–2	Göztepe
2011–12	17–09–2011	First League	Göztepe	1–1	Karşıyaka
2011–12	29–01–2012	First League	Karşıyaka	1–0	Göztepe
2012–13	28–10–2012	First League	Karşıyaka	2–0	Göztepe
2012–13	17–03–2013	First League	Göztepe	3–2	Karşıyaka
2015–16	08–11–2015	First League	Karşıyaka	1–0	Göztepe
2015–16	10–04–2016	First League	Göztepe	2–0	Karşıyaka
