= 1962–63 Turkish National League =

5th season of top-tier Turkish football

Turkish National League
- Season: 1962–63
- Champions: Galatasaray; 2nd title
- Relegated: Karagümrük; Şeker Hilal; Vefa; Yeşildirek
- European Cup: Galatasaray
- Cup Winners' Cup: Fenerbahçe
- Inter-Cities Fairs Cup: Altay
- Balkans Cup: Altay; Beşiktaş
- Matches: 352
- Goals: 937 (2.66 per match)
- Top goalscorer: Metin Oktay (38 (16+22) goals)
- Biggest home win: Gençlerbirliği 8–1 Şeker Hilal

The 1962–63 Turkish National League was the fifth season of professional football in Turkey and the last year the top division in Turkey was named the Turkish National League. With the creation of the 2.Lig in 1963–64, the top-flight football division in Turkey would be re-branded as the 1.Lig. Galatasaray won their second league title.

== Overview ==
Galatasaray won their second title, becoming the first club to win back-to-back league titles. Beşiktaş finished runners-up, with Fenerbahçe rounding out the top three. Galatasaray qualified for the European Cup. With Galatasaray having already qualified for the European Cup, Turkish Cup runners-up Fenerbahçe were sent to compete in the European Cup Winners' Cup instead. Altay qualified for the Balkans Cup and the Inter-Cities Fairs Cup, and Beşiktaş qualified for the Balkans Cup. Metin Oktay finished top scorer with a total of 38 goals; 16 in the group stages and 22 in the finals.

A new format was put into place for this season only: the 22 clubs competing were split into two groups of 11. The top six clubs from each group qualified for the final group. Clubs finishing 7 to 9 qualified for the classification group, while clubs in 10th and 11th place were relegated to the newly created 2.Lig. The final group consisted of twelve clubs and was played as if it were a regular league, except no clubs were relegated. The clubs who qualified for the classification group played each other twice to decide who would be ranked from 13th to 18th place. Karagümrük, Şeker Hilal, Vefa, and Yeşildirek were relegated.

== Preliminary groups ==
=== Red group ===
Pos	Team	Pld	W	D	L	GF	GA	GR	Pts	Qualification or relegation
1	Galatasaray	20	14	4	2	51	21	2.429	32	Qualification to Championship group
2	Gençlerbirliği	20	12	2	6	34	22	1.545	26	Qualification to Championship group
3	Karşıyaka	20	10	4	6	22	19	1.158	24	Qualification to Championship group
4	Ankara Demirspor	20	9	5	6	38	26	1.462	23	Qualification to Championship group
5	Beykoz	20	8	5	7	18	23	0.783	21	Qualification to Championship group
6	Altay	20	8	4	8	25	24	1.042	20	Qualification to Championship group
7	Göztepe	20	8	3	9	27	25	1.080	19	Qualification to Classification group
8	Beyoğluspor	20	8	3	9	23	32	0.719	19	Qualification to Classification group
9	Feriköy	20	6	2	12	19	22	0.864	14	Qualification to Classification group
10	Karagümrük (R)	20	4	4	12	20	32	0.625	12	Relegation to Turkish Second Football League
11	Şeker Hilal (R)	20	2	6	12	25	56	0.446	10	Relegation to Turkish Second Football League

Rules for classification: 1. Points 2. Goal ratio
(R) Relegated

==== Results ====
Home \ Away	ALT	AND	BYK	BEY	FER	GAL	GEN	GÖZ	FKG	KSK	ŞKR
Altay		3–1	1–0	1–2	0–4	2–0	3–0	0–0	1–2	1–0	1–0
Ankara Demirspor	3–3		2–1	1–1	2–0	1–1	4–0	1–1	2–1	0–1	7–2
Beykoz	1–0	2–0		1–0	1–0	1–6	0–1	2–1	1–0	0–2	2–1
Beyoğlu	2–0	3–2	0–0		1–0	3–2	0–1	1–3	3–2	1–2	2–1
Feriköy	1–1	0–1	1–2	3–1		0–1	1–2	0–1	2–0	1–1	1–0
Galatasaray	1–0	2–2	1–1	5–1	3–2		2–1	3–1	1–0	3–1	5–1
Gençlerbirliği	1–0	0–1	1–0	2–1	2–0	0–3		3–2	1–1	4–0	8–1
Göztepe	2–1	1–0	1–1	5–0	1–0	0–1	1–3		0–1	1–2	3–1
Karagümrük	1–3	1–2	1–1	0–1	0–1	1–5	1–0	3–0		1–3	1–1
Karşıyaka	0–1	1–0	2–0	1–0	0–1	1–1	0–0	1–0	2–1		0–1
Şekerhilâl	3–3	2–5	1–1	0–0	2–1	2–5	1–4	1–3	2–2	2–2	

Source: TFF, Mackolik
Legend: Blue = home team win; Yellow = draw; Red = away team win.

=== White group ===
Pos	Team	Pld	W	D	L	GF	GA	GR	Pts	Qualification or relegation
1	Beşiktaş	20	15	4	1	47	15	3.133	34	Qualification to Championship group
2	Fenerbahçe	20	13	6	1	40	9	4.444	32	Qualification to Championship group
3	İstanbulspor	20	6	9	5	24	26	0.923	21	Qualification to Championship group
4	İzmirspor	20	8	4	8	19	21	0.905	20	Qualification to Championship group
5	Kasımpaşa	20	6	8	6	15	24	0.625	20	Qualification to Championship group
6	Hacettepe	20	6	6	8	24	22	1.091	18	Qualification to Championship group
7	MKE Ankaragücü	20	5	8	7	24	24	1.000	18	Qualification to Classification group
8	Altınordu	20	6	6	8	17	18	0.944	18	Qualification to Classification group
9	PTT	20	5	6	9	16	22	0.727	16	Qualification to Classification group
10	Vefa (R)	20	3	7	10	22	37	0.595	13	Relegation to Turkish Second Football League
11	Yeşildirek (R)	20	3	4	13	11	41	0.268	10	Relegation to Turkish Second Football League

Rules for classification: 1. Points 2. Goal ratio
(R) Relegated

==== Results ====
Home \ Away	ATO	AGÜ	BJK	FNB	HAC	İST	İZM	KAS	PTT	VEF	YEŞ
Altınordu		2–0	0–2	0–0	3–1	0–1	2–1	2–0	2–0	1–1	3–0
Ankaragücü	0–0		2–2	2–5	1–1	1–1	1–1	3–0	1–2	2–1	3–0
Beşiktaş	1–0	2–1		2–1	1–0	2–1	4–0	3–0	4–2	4–0	3–0
Fenerbahçe	1–0	2–0	1–1		3–0	1–1	3–0	0–0	0–0	4–0	3–1
Hacettepe	0–0	1–0	1–2	1–2		6–2	3–0	0–0	4–1	2–0	1–1
İstanbulspor	4–1	1–1	1–1	0–2	1–0		1–0	1–1	2–1	3–2	2–2
İzmirspor	1–0	1–1	1–0	0–2	0–0	2–0		5–1	0–1	2–0	2–0
Kasımpaşa	0–0	0–0	1–3	0–2	2–1	1–1	1–0		0–0	3–2	1–1
PTT	3–0	1–0	0–2	0–0	0–1	0–0	0–1	0–1		2–2	2–0
Vefa	1–1	1–2	2–2	0–5	3–1	1–1	1–1	0–1	0–0		2–0
Yeşildirek	1–0	0–3	1–6	1–3	0–0	1–0	0–1	0–2	2–1	0–3	

Source: TFF, Mackolik
Legend: Blue = home team win; Yellow = draw; Red = away team win.

== Final groups ==
=== Championship group ===
Pos	Team	Pld	W	D	L	GF	GA	GR	Pts	Qualification
1	Galatasaray (C)	22	14	7	1	54	14	3.857	35	Qualification to European Cup preliminary round
2	Beşiktaş	22	14	6	2	45	12	3.750	34	
3	Fenerbahçe	22	11	6	5	33	19	1.737	28	Qualification to Cup Winners' Cup first round
4	Altay	22	8	8	6	23	25	0.920	24	Invitation to Inter-Cities Fairs Cup first round
5	İstanbulspor	22	7	9	6	29	27	1.074	23	
6	Gençlerbirliği	22	5	11	6	32	30	1.067	21	
7	Hacettepe	22	8	4	10	34	41	0.829	20	
8	İzmirspor	22	7	6	9	27	38	0.711	20	
9	Beykoz	22	5	8	9	25	28	0.893	18	
10	Ankara Demirspor	22	6	6	10	34	41	0.829	18	
11	Karşıyaka	22	3	7	12	26	57	0.456	13	
12	Kasımpaşa	22	2	6	14	17	47	0.362	10	

Rules for classification: 1. Points 2. Goal ratio
(C) Champions

==== Results ====
Home \ Away	ALT	AND	BJK	BYK	FNB	GAL	GEN	HAC	İST	İZM	KSK	KAS
Altay		1–1	1–1	1–0	0–1	0–0	2–1	3–2	0–0	1–0	1–0	2–0
Ankara Demirspor	2–1		1–3	0–0	1–4	1–4	2–2	1–2	4–1	2–0	6–1	2–1
Beşiktaş	6–2	4–0		2–0	2–2	0–1	2–0	1–0	0–0	0–0	5–0	3–0
Beykoz	1–0	1–1	1–1		2–0	1–3	2–2	5–0	1–1	1–1	3–2	0–0
Fenerbahçe	2–2	0–1	2–0	3–1		1–1	4–1	1–0	1–0	1–0	4–1	0–1
Galatasaray	3–1	2–0	1–2	4–0	0–0		1–1	0–0	6–0	3–0	3–0	5–2
Gençlerbirliği	0–0	3–1	1–1	1–1	0–0	2–3		1–1	0–0	4–1	4–0	3–1
Hacettepe	1–2	3–2	0–2	1–0	2–1	1–6	1–1		2–2	3–1	5–0	2–0
İstanbulspor	0–0	2–2	0–2	1–0	0–0	0–0	1–0	4–1		3–0	4–0	3–0
İzmirspor	2–0	2–1	0–4	2–1	2–0	1–5	4–1	3–2	4–2		2–2	2–2
Karşıyaka	2–2	2–2	0–2	3–1	1–2	1–1	1–3	3–2	2–0	1–1		1–1
Kasımpaşa	0–1	2–1	0–2	0–4	0–3	0–2	0–0	2–3	2–5	0–0	3–3	

Source: TFF, Mackolik
Legend: Blue = home team win; Yellow = draw; Red = away team win.

=== Classification group ===
Pos	Team	Pld	W	D	L	GF	GA	GR	Pts
13	Göztepe	10	7	1	2	25	11	2.273	15
14	Altınordu	10	4	3	3	16	11	1.455	11
15	Feriköy	10	4	2	4	9	8	1.125	10
16	MKE Ankaragücü	10	4	1	5	12	14	0.857	9
17	PTT	10	4	0	6	12	22	0.545	8
18	Beyoğluspor	10	2	3	5	10	18	0.556	7

Rules for classification: 1. Points 2. Goal ratio
