= Nazmi Bilge =

Turkish footballer and manager

Personal information
- Date of birth: 10 October 1934
- Place of birth: Trabzon, Turkey
- Date of death: 8 August 2013 (aged 78)
- Place of death: Turkey
- Height: 1.72 m (5 ft 8 in)
- Position: Forward

Senior career*
Years	Team	Apps	(Gls)
1954–1961	Beşiktaş	131	(69)
1962–1965	Altay	71	(25)

International career
1953–1958	Turkey	3	(1)

Managerial career
- 1969–1970: Karabükspor
- * Club domestic league appearances and goals

Nazmi Bilge (10 October 1934 – 8 August 2013) was a Turkish football player and manager. He spent most of his career at Beşiktaş, where he was captain and achieved his greatest success.

== Career ==
At Beşiktaş he scored a total of 158 goals in all competitions, including the Istanbul Football League, Turkish National Division, Turkish Federation Cup, and Süper Lig. He was the leading goalscorer in the 1956–57 season of the Federation Cup and is known for having scored the first goal of Beşiktaş in the Süper Lig.

== Honours ==
=== Club ===
- Turkish Federation Cup: 1956–57, 1957–58
- Millî Lig: 1959–60

=== Individual ===
- Turkish Federation Cup top scorer: 1956–57
- Milliyet Athlete of the Year: 1959
