= 1957–58 Federation Cup =

2nd season of Federation Cup

Turkish Federation Cup
- Season: 1957–58
- Champions: Beşiktaş; 2nd title
- European Cup: Beşiktaş
- Matches played: 64
- Goals scored: 205 (3.2 per match)
- Top goalscorer: Lefter Küçükandonyadis; Metin Oktay (10 goals)
- Biggest home win: Galatasaray 10–0 Anadolu
- Biggest away win: Güneşspor 3–1 Kasımpaşa
- Highest scoring: Beşiktaş 8–2 Feriköy; Galatasaray 10–0 Anadolu

The 1957–58 Federation Cup was the second season of the Turkish Federation Cup. The winner of the competition would represent Turkey at the 1958–59 European Cup. It was also the last edition of the Federation Cup, for the next season would be the Turkish First Football League. 38 clubs participated: 20 from Istanbul, 10 from İzmir, and 8 from Ankara. Beşiktaş won the title for the second time.

== First round ==
=== Istanbul Group ===
| Team 1 | Score | Team 2 |
|---|---|---|
| Beyoğlu | 1–0 | Sarıyer |
| Kasımpaşa | 5–0 | Davutpaşa |
| Vefa | 4–1 | Beylerbeyi |
| Beşiktaş | 8–2 | Feriköy |

=== İzmir Group ===
| Team 1 | Score | Team 2 |
|---|---|---|
| Karşıyaka | 2–1 | Kültürspor |
| Ülküspor | 3–2 | Göztepe |

== Second round ==
=== Istanbul Group ===
| Team 1 | Score | Team 2 |
|---|---|---|
| Adalet | 6–0 | Süleymaniye |
| İstanbulspor | 7–1 | Eyüpspor |
| Beykoz | 2–0 | Taksim |
| Beşiktaş | 1–0 | Yeşildirek |
| Galatasaray | 10–0 | Anadolu Üsküdar |
| Fenerbahçe | 3–0 | Galata |
| Vefa | 5–4 | Beyoğlu |
| Kasımpaşa | 1–0 | Karagümrük |

=== İzmir Group ===
| Team 1 | Score | Team 2 |
|---|---|---|
| Ülküspor | 2–1 | Karşıyaka |
| Altay | 1–0 | Yün Pamuk Mensucat |
| İzmir Demirspor | 3–2 | İzmirspor |
| Altınordu | 2–0 | Egespor |

=== Ankara Group ===
| Team 1 | Score | Team 2 |
|---|---|---|
| Ankaragücü | 2–0 | Otoyıldırım |
| Ankara Demirspor | 3–0 | Hacettepe |
| Güneşspor | 2–1 | Yolspor |
| Gençlerbirliği | 2–1 | Hilal |

== Third round ==
In the third round the remaining 8 teams were split into 2 groups of 4 (red group and white group).

=== Red Group ===
| Team 1 | Agg. | Team 2 | 1st leg | 2nd leg |
|---|---|---|---|---|
| Adalet | 0–2 | Ankara Demirspor | 0–1 | 0–1 |
| İstanbulspor | 2–2 | Altay | 2–2 | 0–0 |
| Beşiktaş | 5–3 | Gençlerbirliği | 1–2 | 4–1 |
| Beykoz | 2–1 | Altınordu | 2–1 | 0–0 |

=== White Group ===
| Team 1 | Agg. | Team 2 | 1st leg | 2nd leg |
|---|---|---|---|---|
| Galatasaray | 5–2 | Ankaragücü | 4–2 | 1–0 |
| Fenerbahçe | 11–2 | Ülküspor | 7–2 | 4–0 |
| Kasımpaşa | 2–4 | Güneşspor | 1–1 | 1–3 |
| Vefa | 4–1 | İzmir Demirspor | 2–1 | 2–0 |

== Group stage ==
=== Red Group ===
| Pos | Team | Pld | W | D | L | GF | GA | GD | Pts | BJK | İST | ADS | BYK |
|---|---|---|---|---|---|---|---|---|---|---|---|---|---|
| 1 | Beşiktaş | 6 | 5 | 0 | 1 | 14 | 5 | +9 | 10 | | 4–2 | 4–1 | 4–1 |
| 2 | İstanbulspor | 6 | 3 | 0 | 3 | 9 | 8 | +1 | 6 | 0–1 | | 3–1 | 3–1 |
| 3 | Ankara Demirspor | 6 | 3 | 0 | 3 | 6 | 11 | −5 | 6 | 1–0 | 1–0 | | 0–3 |
| 4 | Beykoz | 6 | 1 | 0 | 5 | 6 | 11 | −5 | 2 | 0–1 | 0–1 | 1–2 | |

Source: rsssf.com

=== White Group ===
| Pos | Team | Pld | W | D | L | GF | GA | GD | Pts | GAL | VEF | FNB | GÜN |
|---|---|---|---|---|---|---|---|---|---|---|---|---|---|
| 1 | Galatasaray | 6 | 4 | 1 | 1 | 14 | 5 | +9 | 9 | | 0–0 | 2–3 | 7–0 |
| 2 | Vefa | 6 | 2 | 3 | 1 | 4 | 3 | +1 | 7 | 0–1 | | 1–0 | 0–0 |
| 3 | Fenerbahçe | 6 | 2 | 1 | 3 | 7 | 7 | 0 | 5 | 1–2 | 0–1 | | 2–0 |
| 4 | Güneşspor | 6 | 0 | 3 | 3 | 4 | 14 | −10 | 3 | 1–2 | 2–2 | 1–1 | |

Source: rsssf.com

== Final ==
The final was held at Dolmabahçe Stadium.

| Team 1 | Agg. | Team 2 | 1st leg | 2nd leg |
|---|---|---|---|---|
| Galatasaray | 0–2 | Beşiktaş | 0–1 | 0–1 |

Federation Cup 1957–58 winners
Beşiktaş
Second title
