= 1956–57 Beşiktaş J.K. season =

Beşiktaş J.K.
1956–57 season
- President: (Turkey) Danyal Akbel
- Manager: (Hungary) József Mészaros
- Istanbul Football League: 5th
- Turkish Federation Cup: Winner

The 1956–57 season was Beşiktaş's 41st official football season and their 54th year in existence. They finished 5th in the 1956-57 Istanbul League season behind Fenerbahçe, Galatasaray, İstanbulspor and Beykoz. They also competed in Turkey's first ever professional national league, the Turkish Federation Cup. They won the cup and qualified for the 1957–58 European Cup, but the Turkish Football Federation did not send their names to the UEFA, therefore being disqualified without playing a single match.

== İstanbul Football League ==
In the 1956-57 İstanbul Football League season Beşiktaş finished 5th place.

Pos	Team	Pld	W	D	L	GF	GA	GD	Pts
3	İstanbulspor	18	9	6	3	32	21	+11	24
4	Beykoz 1908 S.K.D.	18	8	3	7	30	25	+5	19
5	Beşiktaş JK	18	8	3	7	33	30	+3	19
6	Adalet SK	18	6	6	6	29	26	+3	18
7	Vefa SK	18	5	4	9	20	26	−6	14
