= 1956–57 Federation Cup =

1st season of Federation Cup

Turkish Federation Cup
- Season: 1956–57
- Champions: Beşiktaş; 1st title
- European Cup: Beşiktaş
- Matches played: 53
- Goals scored: 160 (3.02 per match)
- Top goalscorer: Nazmi Bilge (8)
- Biggest home win: Kültürspor 8–0 Egespor
- Biggest away win: Ankara Demirspor 0–7 Galatasaray

The 1956–57 Turkish Federation Cup was the first professional nationwide football competition in Turkey. The tournament was organized by the Turkish Football Federation (TFF) to select a club that would represent Turkey in the 1957–58 European Cup. 30 clubs participated: 10 from Istanbul, 10 from İzmir, 8 from Ankara, and 2 from Adana. These teams were split into three groups: the Istanbul Group, İzmir Group, and the Ankara Group (the two clubs from Adana were included in the Ankara Group). The first three rounds were contested in a single knock-out system. The top two teams from each group qualified for the Final Group, which was played in league format.

Beşiktaş won the title and qualified for the 1957–58 European Cup as Turkish champions. However, since the TFF failed to register their name for the draw in time, they could not participate in the European Cup in that season after all.

== Round 1 ==
=== Istanbul Group ===
Team 1	Score	Team 2
İstanbulspor	4–1	Emniyet SK
Beşiktaş	2–1	Beyoğlu

=== İzmir Group ===
Team 1	Score	Team 2
Altay	?–?	Karşıyaka
Ülküspor	?–?	İzmir Demirspor

=== Ankara Group ===
Team 1	Score	Team 2
Gençlerbirliği	4–1	Hilal
Ankaragücü	1–0	Yolspor

== Round 2 ==
=== Istanbul Group ===
Team 1	Score	Team 2
Beykoz	3–1	Adalet
Galatasaray	1–0	Vefa
Fenerbahçe	6–0	Kasımpaşa
Beşiktaş	1–0	İstanbulspor

=== İzmir Group ===
Team 1	Score	Team 2
Göztepe	1–1^{1}	Yün Pamuk Mensucat
Kültürspor	8–0	Egespor
Altınordu	2–1	İzmirspor
Altay	2–0	Ülküspor

- ^{1} Göztepe won 2–0 in the playoff match.

=== Ankara Group ===
Team 1	Score	Team 2
Hacettepe	?–?	Otoyıldırım
Adana Milli Mensucat	1–0	Ankara Demirspor
Güneşspor	1–0	Adana Demirspor
Gençlerbirliği	3–0^{2}	Ankaragücü

- ^{2} Match abandoned at 3–0. Gençlerbirliği were awarded the win.

== Round 3 ==
=== Istanbul Group ===
Team 1	Score	Team 2
Galatasaray	3–2	Fenerbahçe
Beşiktaş	3–2	Beykoz

=== İzmir Group ===
Team 1	Score	Team 2
Kültürspor	1–0	Altınordu
Altay	4–1	Göztepe

=== Ankara Group ===
Team 1	Score	Team 2
Adana Milli Mensucat	2–1	Güneşspor
Gençlerbirliği	3–2	Hacettepe

== Final group ==
Pos	Team	Pld	W	D	L	GF	GA	GD	Pts	Qualification	BJK	GAL	ALT	GEN	KÜL	AMM
1	Beşiktaş (C)	10	8	1	1	23	6	+17	17	European Cup		2–1	3–0	3–0	3–0	4–0
2	Galatasaray	10	6	2	2	22	8	+14	14		1–0		4–1	1–1	7–0	4–1
3	Altay	10	5	2	3	18	14	+4	12		1–1	2–0		1–0	1–1	6–0
4	Gençlerbirliği	10	4	1	5	15	12	+3	9		1–2	0–2	4–0		4–0	1–1
5	Kültürspor	10	3	1	6	10	25	−15	7		1–3	1–2	3–4	2–1		4–1
6	Adana Milli Mensucat	10	0	1	9	5	28	−23	1		1–2	0–0	1–3	1–3	0–1	

(C) Champions

1956–57 Federation Cup winners
Beşiktaş
First title
