= 1963–64 Turkish Second Football League =

Turkish Second Football League
- Season: 1963–64
- Champions: Şekerspor
- Promoted: Şekerspor
- Relegated: İzmir Demirspor
- Matches: 312
- Goals: 349 (1.12 per match)
- Top goalscorer: Feridun Köse (Güneş) (13)
- Biggest home win: 7-0
- Biggest away win: 0-3 (three games)
- Highest scoring: 7-0, 5-2, 4-3

The 1963–64 Turkish Second Football league was the first season of Turkish second level football league. The league had 13 teams. Play started on 15 September 1963 and ended 7 June 1964.

== Teams ==
Locations of teams in the 1963–64 TFF Second League.

== Team summaries ==
Team	Colors	Location	Stadium	President	Coach
Adana Demirspor		Adana	Adana City Stadium		
Altındağ		Ankara	Ankara 19 Mayıs Stadium		
Beylerbeyi		Istanbul	Mithatpaşa Stadium		
Bursaspor		Bursa	Bursa Atatürk Stadium		
Çukurova İdmanyurdu		Mersin	Mersin City Stadium	Mehmet Karamehmet	
Güneşsspor		Ankara	Ankara 19 Mayıs Stadium		
İzmir Demirspor		İzmir	Alsancak Stadium		
Karagümrük		Istanbul	Mithatpaşa Stadium		
Sarıyer		Istanbul	Mithatpaşa Stadium		
Şekerspor		Ankara	Ankara 19 Mayıs Stadium		Fahrettin Cansever
Ülküspor		İzmir	Alsancak Stadium		
Vefa		Istanbul	Mithatpaşa Stadium		
Yeşildirek		Istanbul	Şeref Stadium		

Note: By the end of the season

== League table ==
Pos	Team	Pld	W	D	L	GF	GA	GD	Pts	Promotion or relegation
1	Şekerspor (P)	24	18	4	2	44	10	+34	40	Promoted to 1964–65 Turkish First Football League
2	Adana Demirspor	24	17	4	3	30	10	+20	38	
3	Beylerbeyi	24	9	7	8	25	24	+1	25	
4	Vefa	24	9	7	8	27	28	−1	25	
5	Çukurova İdmanyurdu	24	10	5	9	29	31	−2	25	
6	Ülküspor	24	9	6	9	19	24	−5	24	
7	Sarıyer	24	6	10	8	23	25	−2	22	
8	Bursaspor	24	7	8	9	22	26	−4	22	
9	Karagümrük	24	7	7	10	30	29	+1	21	
10	Yeşildirek	24	7	6	11	26	31	−5	20	
11	Güneşspor	24	7	4	13	30	36	−6	18	
12	Altındağ	24	5	6	13	18	30	−12	16	
13	İzmir Demirspor (R)	24	6	4	14	26	45	−19	16	Relegated to Regional Amateur League

Source: 1963–64 Turkish Second Football League Cem Pekin Archives
Rules for classification: 1) points; 2) goal difference; 3) number of goals scored.
(P) Promoted; (R) Relegated

== See also ==
- 1963–64 Turkish First Football League
