= 1964–65 1.Lig =

7th season of top-tier Turkish football

1.Lig
- Season: 1964–65
- Champions: Fenerbahçe; 4th title
- Relegated: Altınordu
- European Cup: Fenerbahçe
- Cup Winners' Cup: Galatasaray
- Inter-Cities Fairs Cup: Göztepe
- Matches played: 240
- Goals scored: 516 (2.15 per match)
- Top goalscorer: Metin Oktay (17 goals)
- Biggest home win: Fenerbahçe 5–0 Feriköy
- Biggest away win: İzmirspor 0–5 Galatasaray

The 1964–65 1.Lig was the seventh season of professional football in Turkey. Fenerbahçe won their fourth title, becoming the first club to win four league titles.

== Overview ==
Fenerbahçe qualified for the European Cup, while Turkish Cup winners Galatasaray qualified for the European Cup Winners' Cup. Göztepe qualified for participation at the Inter-Cities Fairs Cup. Metin Oktay finished top scorer with 17 goals, winning his fifth Gol Kralı award. Altınordu were the only club relegated, while newly promoted Şeker Hilal finished one point above relegation.

== Final league table ==
Pos	Team	Pld	W	D	L	GF	GA	GR	Pts	Qualification or relegation
1	Fenerbahçe (C)	30	18	11	1	52	13	4.000	47	Qualification to European Cup preliminary round and invitation to Balkans Cup
2	Beşiktaş	30	16	9	5	46	17	2.706	41	
3	Galatasaray	30	14	11	5	51	31	1.645	39	Qualification to Cup Winners' Cup first round
4	Göztepe	30	11	9	10	31	33	0.939	31	Invitation to Inter-Cities Fairs Cup first round
5	İstanbulspor	30	10	10	10	28	29	0.966	30	
6	MKE Ankaragücü	30	11	8	11	30	35	0.857	30	
7	PTT	30	8	11	11	37	37	1.000	27	
8	Hacettepe	30	6	15	9	23	28	0.821	27	
9	Altay	30	7	13	10	21	27	0.778	27	
10	Ankara Demirspor	30	7	13	10	34	47	0.723	27	
11	Feriköy	30	7	13	10	18	28	0.643	27	
12	Beykoz	30	8	10	12	26	36	0.722	26 (Note: Beykoz and İzmirspor tied for 12th place after finishing on equal points and equal goals scored to goals allowed average (there were no other tiebreakers at the time))	
12	İzmirspor	30	8	10	12	26	36	0.722	26	
14	Gençlerbirliği	30	10	6	14	33	47	0.702	26	
15	Şeker Hilal	30	7	11	12	32	39	0.821	25	
16	Altınordu (R)	30	8	8	14	28	33	0.848	24	Relegation to Turkish Second Football League

Rules for classification: 1. Points 2. Goal ratio
(C) Champions; (R) Relegated

== Results ==
Home \ Away	ALT	ATO	AND	AGÜ	BJK	BYK	FNB	FER	GAL	GEN	GÖZ	HAC	İST	İZM	PTT	ŞKR
Altay		0–0	1–0	2–0	1–0	1–2	1–1	0–0	1–1	1–0	0–1	1–1	1–2	2–1	0–0	1–1
Altınordu	0–1		3–1	2–0	0–1	1–1	0–0	0–0	2–1	4–1	3–0	0–2	1–2	1–2	3–1	1–0
Ankara Demirspor	3–0	2–2		2–1	1–4	1–1	1–1	3–3	1–1	2–1	2–2	1–0	0–0	2–0	1–1	2–1
Ankaragücü	1–0	1–0	2–1		0–2	1–0	0–0	2–0	3–3	2–1	1–1	4–1	0–0	1–0	2–1	0–0
Beşiktaş	1–0	2–0	2–2	2–0		3–0	1–1	1–0	2–3	5–1	0–1	0–0	3–0	2–1	2–0	3–0
Beykoz	0–0	2–1	1–1	0–1	0–0		1–5	1–0	1–2	1–0	3–0	0–1	0–1	2–0	1–1	2–1
Fenerbahçe	1–1	3–0	0–0	2–0	1–0	4–1		5–0	1–1	2–0	3–1	1–0	2–0	3–0	3–0	2–0
Feriköy	0–0	2–0	1–0	1–0	0–0	0–0	0–1		1–0	3–1	2–2	0–0	0–0	1–0	1–0	1–1
Galatasaray	1–1	1–0	1–1	0–0	1–0	1–0	1–1	4–0		3–2	3–2	1–0	3–1	3–1	1–1	0–0
Gençlerbirliği	3–0	2–1	0–1	2–1	0–3	2–1	1–1	1–0	2–1		1–0	1–1	0–3	1–0	3–2	2–2
Göztepe	1–0	0–1	4–0	1–2	0–0	1–0	0–2	0–0	3–3	1–0		1–0	0–0	1–1	0–1	1–0
Hacettepe	1–1	2–0	1–1	1–1	1–1	2–2	0–2	3–1	1–0	1–1	0–1		1–0	0–0	1–4	0–0
İstanbulspor	2–1	1–0	3–0	1–1	0–1	1–1	1–0	1–0	1–4	2–0	0–1	0–0		1–1	1–1	1–1
İzmirspor	2–1	0–0	4–0	3–1	1–1	0–0	0–0	1–0	0–5	1–1	2–1	0–0	2–1		1–1	2–0
PTT	1–2	1–1	2–0	2–1	1–1	4–1	0–1	0–0	1–0	1–2	2–2	1–1	2–1	3–0		0–1
Şekerspor	0–0	1–1	4–2	4–1	1–3	0–1	2–3	1–1	1–2	1–1	1–2	2–1	2–1	1–0	3–2	

Source: TFF, Mackolik
Legend: Blue = home team win; Yellow = draw; Red = away team win.
