= 1959–60 Turkish National League =

2nd season of top-tier Turkish football

Turkish National League
- Season: 1959–60
- Champions: Beşiktaş; 3rd title
- Relegated: Adalet; Hacettepe
- European Cup: Beşiktaş
- Matches: 380
- Goals: 929 (2.44 per match)
- Top goalscorer: Metin Oktay, 33 goals
- Biggest home win: Galatasaray 8–0 Altınordu
- Highest scoring: Galatasaray 8–0 Altınordu

The 1959–60 Turkish National League was the second season of professional football in Turkey. The league consisted of 20 clubs, with Beşiktaş J.K. winning their third championship.

== Overview ==
The original sixteen clubs of the 1959 Milli Lig took part in the 1959–60 edition, along with newly promoted Kasımpaşa, Şeker Hilal, Altınordu, and Feriköy. Beşiktaş won their first league title, winning 11 matches by a 1–0 margin, a record at the time. Metin Oktay finished top scorer with 33 goals. Clubs were not relegated directly, but instead took part in the Baraj Maçları, a competition between the top four amateur clubs and the bottom three Milli Lig clubs.

Altınordu finished first in the Baraj Maçları, allowing them to stay in the Milli Lig. Hacettepe and Adalet were not successful, earning relegation to the Ankara and Istanbul professional leagues respectively. Adana Demirspor and PTT earned promotion to the Milli Lig. Adana Demirspor would become the first club from outside of the big three cities (Ankara, Istanbul, and İzmir) to compete in the Milli Lig during the following season.

== Final league table ==
| Pos | Team | Pld | W | D | L | GF | GA | GD | Pts | Qualification |
|---|---|---|---|---|---|---|---|---|---|---|
| 1 | Beşiktaş (C) | 38 | 29 | 7 | 2 | 68 | 15 | +53 | 65 | Qualification to European Cup preliminary round |
| 2 | Fenerbahçe | 38 | 27 | 6 | 5 | 88 | 38 | +50 | 60 | Invitation to Balkans Cup |
| 3 | Galatasaray | 38 | 24 | 10 | 4 | 74 | 23 | +51 | 58 | |
| 4 | İzmirspor | 38 | 17 | 13 | 8 | 62 | 44 | +18 | 47 | |
| 5 | Ankara Demirspor | 38 | 17 | 11 | 10 | 49 | 40 | +9 | 45 | |
| 6 | İstanbulspor | 38 | 13 | 16 | 9 | 38 | 35 | +3 | 42 | |
| 7 | Feriköy | 38 | 18 | 4 | 16 | 44 | 39 | +5 | 40 | |
| 8 | Karagümrük | 38 | 15 | 10 | 13 | 50 | 45 | +5 | 40 | |
| 9 | Karşıyaka | 38 | 14 | 8 | 16 | 43 | 52 | −9 | 36 | |
| 10 | Gençlerbirliği | 38 | 12 | 11 | 15 | 50 | 46 | +4 | 35 | |
| 11 | Vefa | 38 | 11 | 13 | 14 | 37 | 60 | −23 | 35 | |
| 12 | Şeker Hilal | 38 | 12 | 10 | 16 | 37 | 43 | −6 | 34 | |
| 13 | Kasımpaşa | 38 | 9 | 15 | 14 | 31 | 48 | −17 | 33 | |
| 14 | Göztepe | 38 | 9 | 14 | 15 | 34 | 41 | −7 | 32 | |
| 15 | Ankaragücü | 38 | 9 | 12 | 17 | 39 | 56 | −17 | 30 | |
| 16 | Beykoz | 38 | 8 | 14 | 16 | 35 | 56 | −21 | 30 | |
| 17 | Altay | 38 | 10 | 8 | 20 | 45 | 64 | −19 | 28 | |
| 18 | Adalet | 38 | 9 | 8 | 21 | 26 | 48 | −22 | 26 | Qualification to Baraj Games |
| 19 | Hacettepe | 38 | 8 | 8 | 22 | 42 | 68 | −26 | 24 | Qualification to Baraj Games |
| 20 | Altınordu | 38 | 6 | 8 | 24 | 38 | 69 | −31 | 20 | Qualification to Baraj Games |

Source: rsssf.com
(C) Champions

== Results ==
| Home \ Away | ADL | ALT | ATO | AND | AGÜ | BJK | BYK | FNB | FER | GAL | GEN | GÖZ | HAC | İST | İZM | FKG | KSK | KAS | ŞKR | VEF |
|---|---|---|---|---|---|---|---|---|---|---|---|---|---|---|---|---|---|---|---|---|
| Adalet | | 3–2 | 1–0 | 1–2 | 0–0 | 0–2 | 0–2 | 0–1 | 2–0 | 0–2 | 0–1 | 0–0 | 4–2 | 0–0 | 0–1 | 0–0 | 2–1 | 4–1 | 0–1 | 2–0 |
| Altay | 2–0 | | 2–3 | 1–1 | 1–1 | 0–3 | 3–2 | 1–2 | 2–1 | 0–3 | 4–2 | 4–2 | 2–1 | 2–1 | 1–1 | 1–2 | 0–1 | 0–1 | 2–0 | 0–0 |
| Altınordu | 6–0 | 4–1 | | 1–2 | 2–0 | 0–3 | 0–0 | 0–1 | 2–1 | 1–3 | 1–1 | 0–1 | 0–0 | 0–0 | 1–1 | 0–1 | 1–3 | 1–3 | 1–3 | 2–2 |
| Ankara Demirspor | 1–0 | 3–2 | 2–1 | | 1–0 | 0–1 | 1–0 | 0–1 | 1–0 | 1–1 | 1–1 | 1–0 | 1–0 | 1–2 | 0–1 | 2–1 | 0–1 | 0–0 | 2–1 | 1–1 |
| Ankaragücü | 1–0 | 1–3 | 2–0 | 3–2 | | 0–0 | 1–1 | 1–4 | 0–1 | 0–1 | 4–2 | 2–1 | 1–1 | 1–1 | 1–2 | 0–0 | 3–1 | 1–1 | 0–4 | 1–1 |
| Beşiktaş | 4–1 | 1–0 | 2–0 | 1–1 | 2–0 | | 3–0 | 1–0 | 3–0 | 1–0 | 2–1 | 3–1 | 3–0 | 1–1 | 1–0 | 2–0 | 6–0 | 1–0 | 1–0 | 2–1 |
| Beykoz | 0–0 | 0–0 | 6–3 | 0–0 | 0–4 | 1–1 | | 1–2 | 2–1 | 2–3 | 1–0 | 0–0 | 0–3 | 1–1 | 1–1 | 0–3 | 1–0 | 1–0 | 1–1 | 1–1 |
| Fenerbahçe | 3–1 | 5–0 | 2–0 | 1–0 | 5–1 | 1–0 | 4–0 | | 2–1 | 1–0 | 4–3 | 0–0 | 3–1 | 3–0 | 2–2 | 0–2 | 4–1 | 1–1 | 6–1 | 5–1 |
| Feriköy | 1–0 | 2–0 | 1–0 | 2–1 | 4–1 | 0–1 | 2–0 | 2–3 | | 1–2 | 1–0 | 1–0 | 0–0 | 2–0 | 1–0 | 0–0 | 2–0 | 1–1 | 2–1 | 1–0 |
| Galatasaray | 1–1 | 0–0 | 8–0 | 4–1 | 2–0 | 0–1 | 2–0 | 2–1 | 3–0 | | 3–0 | 2–1 | 1–0 | 1–0 | 1–1 | 2–1 | 5–0 | 0–0 | 1–0 | 0–0 |
| Gençlerbirliği | 0–1 | 5–0 | 3–1 | 3–0 | 0–2 | 0–1 | 1–1 | 2–1 | 3–0 | 2–2 | | 0–0 | 2–1 | 0–0 | 1–2 | 3–0 | 2–2 | 2–1 | 0–0 | 3–0 |
| Göztepe | 0–0 | 3–1 | 0–0 | 2–2 | 3–2 | 0–1 | 1–2 | 0–0 | 2–1 | 0–1 | 0–2 | | 0–1 | 0–1 | 2–1 | 0–1 | 1–0 | 4–1 | 0–0 | 3–1 |
| Hacettepe | 2–0 | 1–1 | 3–0 | 1–5 | 0–2 | 1–2 | 1–1 | 1–3 | 1–3 | 1–2 | 2–2 | 2–1 | | 0–4 | 1–1 | 0–4 | 1–4 | 4–0 | 0–1 | 0–0 |
| İstanbulspor | 1–1 | 3–2 | 2–1 | 1–3 | 1–1 | 1–1 | 1–0 | 1–2 | 0–0 | 0–3 | 1–0 | 0–0 | 2–1 | | 2–2 | 3–0 | 1–0 | 1–0 | 1–1 | 1–2 |
| İzmirspor | 1–0 | 2–1 | 1–0 | 0–0 | 3–0 | 3–1 | 4–1 | 4–2 | 1–0 | 3–3 | 4–1 | 1–2 | 5–3 | 0–0 | | 1–1 | 1–2 | 1–1 | 0–1 | 1–1 |
| Karagümrük | 2–0 | 2–1 | 2–2 | 2–3 | 1–0 | 1–4 | 0–0 | 3–3 | 2–1 | 1–0 | 0–0 | 2–0 | 1–2 | 0–0 | 2–4 | | 1–2 | 1–2 | 2–0 | 2–0 |
| Karşıyaka | 1–0 | 2–0 | 1–3 | 0–3 | 1–1 | 0–2 | 2–1 | 2–2 | 2–0 | 0–0 | 0–1 | 1–1 | 2–1 | 1–2 | 0–1 | 3–1 | | 0–0 | 2–0 | 1–1 |
| Kasımpaşa | 3–0 | 1–1 | 1–0 | 1–2 | 0–0 | 0–0 | 1–0 | 1–4 | 1–2 | 0–4 | 1–1 | 1–1 | 2–1 | 0–3 | 1–3 | 0–0 | 0–0 | | 3–2 | 0–0 |
| Şekerhilâl | 0–2 | 0–1 | 2–1 | 1–1 | 1–0 | 0–0 | 2–3 | 1–3 | 0–2 | 1–1 | 1–0 | 1–1 | 0–1 | 0–0 | 2–0 | 3–1 | 1–0 | 0–1 | | 1–0 |
| Vefa | 1–0 | 1–0 | 1–0 | 1–1 | 3–1 | 1–4 | 3–2 | 0–1 | 0–4 | 1–5 | 1–0 | 2–2 | 3–1 | 1–0 | 3–2 | 1–5 | 0–4 | 1–0 | 1–1 | |

Source: TFF, Mackolik, and rsssf.com
Legend: Blue = home team win; Yellow = draw; Red = away team win.

== Baraj Games ==
| Pos | Team | Pld | W | D | L | GF | GA | GD | Pts | Qualification or relegation |
|---|---|---|---|---|---|---|---|---|---|---|
| 1 | Altınordu | 6 | 3 | 2 | 1 | 9 | 3 | +6 | 8 | Remain in the Milli Lig |
| 2 | Adana Demirspor | 6 | 4 | 0 | 2 | 13 | 8 | +5 | 8 | Promoted to the Milli Lig |
| 3 | PTT | 6 | 4 | 0 | 2 | 13 | 8 | +5 | 8 | Promoted to the Milli Lig |
| 4 | Hacettepe | 6 | 3 | 1 | 2 | 10 | 9 | +1 | 7 | Relegated to Ankara Professional League |
| 5 | Adalet | 6 | 2 | 1 | 3 | 7 | 8 | −1 | 5 | Relegated to Istanbul Professional League |
| 6 | Eyüpspor | 6 | 1 | 2 | 3 | 4 | 13 | −9 | 4 | Relegated to Istanbul Professional League |
| 7 | İzmirspor | 6 | 0 | 2 | 4 | 2 | 9 | −7 | 2 | Relegated to İzmir Professional League |

Source: rsssf.com
