= 1959 Turkish National League =

1st season of top-tier Turkish football

Turkish National League
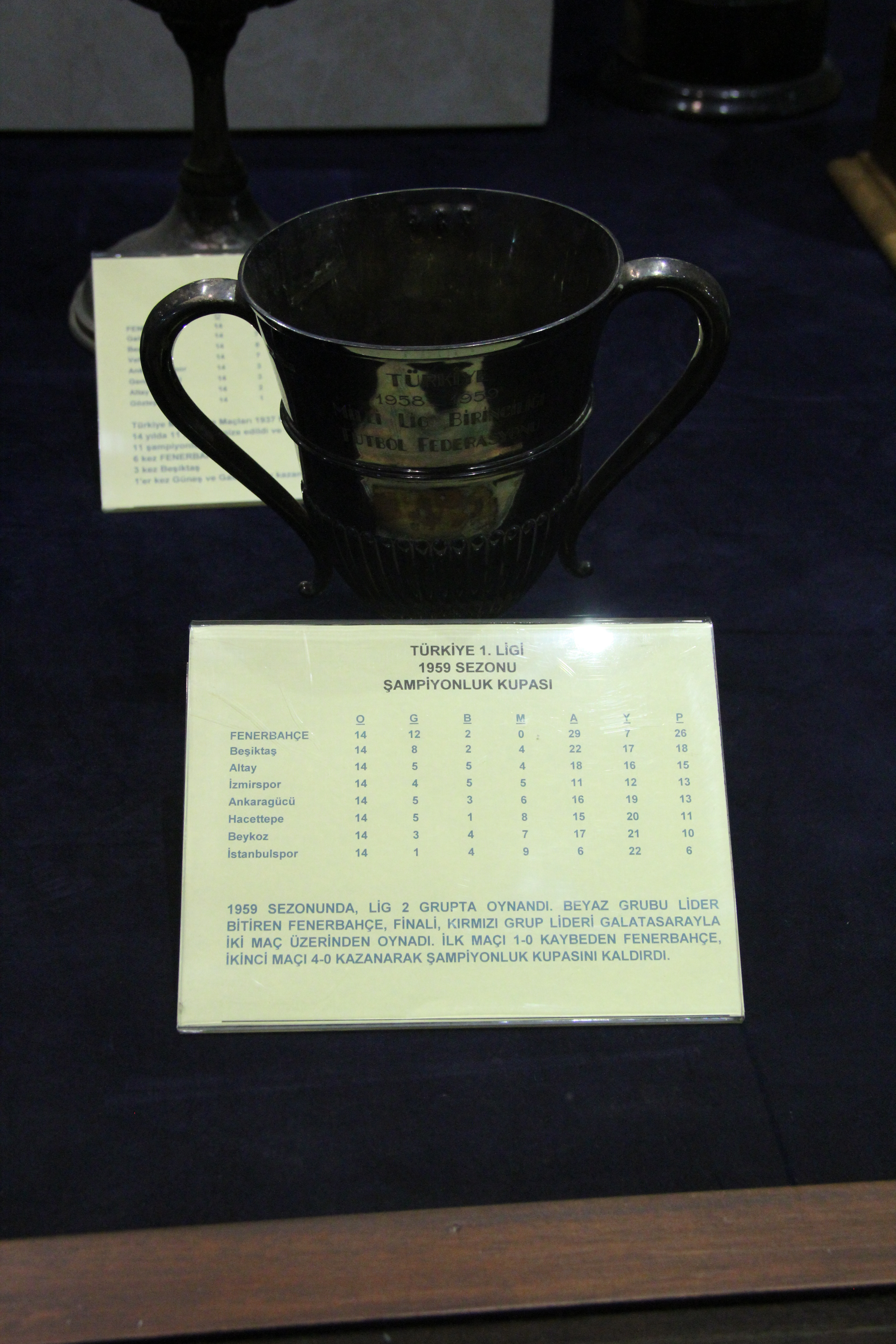
- 1959 Millî Lig trophy on display in the Fenerbahçe Museum
- Season: 1959
- Champions: Fenerbahçe; 1st title
- Relegated: none
- European Cup: Fenerbahçe
- Matches played: 114
- Goals scored: 264 (2.32 per match)
- Top goalscorer: Metin Oktay (11 goals)
- Biggest home win: Galatasaray 5–0 Göztepe
- Biggest away win: İstanbulspor 0–5 Fenerbahçe
- Highest scoring: Göztepe 4–2 Ankara Demirspor

The 1959 Turkish National League was the first season of the professional nationwide league in Turkey, known as Süper Lig today. The National League replaced the previous Turkish football league, the Turkish Federation Cup. The first season consisted of 16 clubs split into two groups: the Kırmızı Grup (Red Group) and Beyaz Grup (White Group), the colours of the Turkish flag. The first season took place in the calendar year of 1959, instead of 1958–59, as the qualifying stages took place in 1958.

== Overview ==
The top eight clubs from the 1958–59 Istanbul Football League and the top four clubs from the Ankara and İzmir leagues in the 1958–59 season took part in the league. These clubs were Adalet, Beşiktaş, Beykoz, Karagümrük, Fenerbahçe, Galatasaray, İstanbulspor, Vefa (from Istanbul), Ankaragücü, Ankara Demirspor, Gençlerbirliği, Hacettepe (from Ankara), Altay, Göztepe, İzmirspor, and Karşıyaka (from İzmir).

The final consisted of two legs and took place between the winners of each group. Galatasaray won the Red Group and Fenerbahçe won the White Group. Galatasaray won the first leg 1-0, but Fenerbahçe won the second leg 4-0, winning 4-1 on aggregate. The title was Fenerbahçe's first Süper Lig title and 10th Turkish championship title overall, qualifying them for the 1959–60 European Cup. Metin Oktay was top scorer with 11 goals. No clubs were relegated this season.

== Red group ==
=== Table ===
Pos	Team	Pld	W	D	L	GF	GA	GD	Pts	Qualification
1	Galatasaray	14	7	6	1	18	7	+11	20	Qualification to Championship final
2	Vefa	14	7	6	1	21	10	+11	20	
3	Ankara Demirspor	14	4	8	2	12	11	+1	16	
4	Göztepe	14	5	5	4	23	21	+2	15	
5	Karagümrük	14	4	4	6	17	17	0	12	
6	Karşıyaka	14	2	6	6	13	21	−8	10	
7	Gençlerbirliği	14	1	8	5	10	18	−8	10	
8	Adalet	14	1	7	6	12	21	−9	9	

Rules for classification: 1) points; 2) goal difference; 3) number of goals scored.

=== Results ===
Home \ Away	ADA	ADS	GAL	GEN	GÖZ	KAG	KRŞ	VEF
Adalet		0–0	0–1	2–3	0–0	0–0	0–0	1–1
Ankara Demirspor	2–1		0–2	0–0	1–1	0–0	1–0	1–1
Galatasaray	2–1	1–2		0–0	5–0	1–0	1–1	0–0
Gençlerbirliği	1–1	0–0	0–0		2–2	1–2	1–1	0–3
Göztepe	2–3	4–2	0–0	2–1		3–0	3–2	0–1
Karagümrük	3–0	1–2	2–3	1–0	1–1		2–2	1–2
Karşıyaka	3–1	1–1	0–1	1–1	1–1	0–3		2–0
Vefa	2–2	0–0	1–1	3–0	3–2	1–0	3–0	

Legend: Blue = home team win; Yellow = draw; Red = away team win.

== White group ==
=== Table ===
Pos	Team	Pld	W	D	L	GF	GA	GD	Pts	Qualification
1	Fenerbahçe	14	12	2	0	29	7	+22	26	Qualification to Championship final
2	Beşiktaş	14	8	2	4	22	16	+6	18	
3	Altay	14	5	5	4	18	16	+2	15	
4	İzmirspor	14	4	5	5	11	12	−1	13	
5	MKE Ankaragücü	14	5	3	6	16	19	−3	13	
6	Hacettepe	14	5	1	8	14	20	−6	11	
7	Beykoz	14	3	4	7	17	21	−4	10	
8	İstanbulspor	14	1	4	9	6	22	−16	6	

Rules for classification: 1) points; 2) goal difference; 3) number of goals scored.

=== Results ===
Home \ Away	ALT	ANK	BEY	BEŞ	FEN	HAC	İST	İZM
Altay		1–0	2–2	3–1	0–1	1–0	2–0	1–1
MKE Ankaragücü	2–1		2–2	1–3	2–3	1–0	1–1	1–0
Beykoz	2–2	3–1		2–3	0–1	1–2	1–1	0–2
Beşiktaş	2–1	0–0	0–1		0–2	3–2	2–1	2–0
Fenerbahçe	1–1	3–1	2–1	1–0		2–1	3–0	1–0
Hacettepe	2–0	1–3	1–0	0–3	1–4		1–1	1–0
İstanbulspor	0–1	0–1	0–0	1–2	0–5	0–2		0–0
İzmirspor	2–2	1–0	2–1	1–1	0–0	1–0	2–0	

Legend: Blue = home team win; Yellow = draw; Red = away team win.

== Championship final ==
First leg

10 June 1959

Galatasaray	1 – 0	Fenerbahçe
Metin Oktay 39'	(Report)

Dolmabahçe Stadium, Istanbul
Attendance: 18,016
Referee: Markovic (Yugoslavia)

Second leg

14 June 1959

Fenerbahçe	4 – 0	Galatasaray
Yüksel Gündüz 9'; Naci Erdem 44'; Mustafa Güven 70'; Şeref Has 72'	(Report)

Dolmabahçe Stadium, Istanbul
Attendance: 26,553
Referee: Francesco Liverani (Italy)

1959 Millî Lig winners
Fenerbahçe
First title

== See also ==
- 1958–59 in Turkish football
