= Leandro Remondini =

Italian footballer and manager

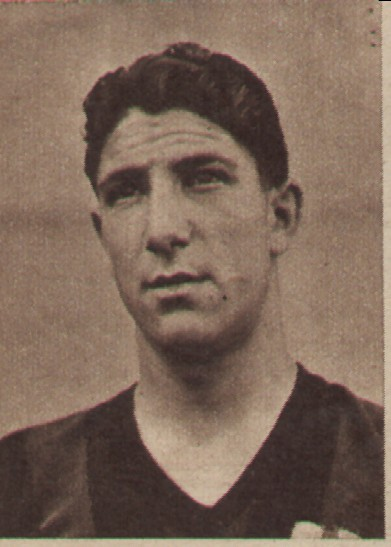

Personal information
- Full name: Leandro Remondini
- Date of birth: 17 November 1917
- Place of birth: Verona, Kingdom of Italy
- Date of death: 9 January 1979 (aged 61)
- Place of death: Milan, Italy
- Height: 1.68 m (5 ft 6 in)
- Position: Midfielder

Senior career*
Years	Team	Apps	(Gls)
1935–1937	Verona	41	(14)
1937–1942	Milan	84	(3)
1942–1943	Modena	27	(1)
1944	Varese	20	(0)
1945–1946	Casale	21	(6)
1946–1947	Modena	34	(2)
1947–1950	Lazio	96	(19)
1950–1951	Napoli	28	(5)
1951–1952	Lucchese	3	(1)
1953–1955	Verona	?	(?)

International career
1950	Italy	1	(0)
1950	Italy B	1	(0)

Managerial career
- 1957–1958: Beşiktaş J.K.
- 1958–1959: Turkey
- 1959: Altay S.K.
- 1959–1960: Galatasaray SK
- 1961–1962: Palermo F.C.
- 1963–1965: U.S. Catanzaro 1929
- * Club domestic league appearances and goals

Leandro Remondini (Italian pronunciation: [leˈandro remonˈdiːni]; 17 November 1917 – 9 January 1979) was an Italian association football player and manager, who played as a midfielder or as a defender.

== Club career ==
Born in Verona, Remondini was a defensive midfielder, who capable of covering any midfield role for his teams and who could also play as a full-back. After playing two seasons in Serie B with Verona, he debuted in Serie A at 20 years of age with Milan, in the same year that Italy won the 1938 World Cup. During the war period, he went from Modena to Casale, and back to Modena, before heading for the capital. With Lazio he played his best football, scoring 19 goals in 95 games and earning a spot on the Italian team for the 1950 World Cup. After the World Cup he went to Napoli, and then ended his Serie A career with Lucchese.

== International career ==
Remondini was the oldest player selected to the Italy national team for the 1950 World Cup. His one cap for the 'Azzurri' was in the team's 2–0 win against Paraguay.

== Style of play ==
A versatile player, Remondini was capable of playing anywhere in midfield, and also as a defender, but was usually deployed as a defensive midfielder, or also as a full-back on occasion.

== Honours ==
=== Manager ===
Beşiktaş

- Süper Lig: 1957–58
