= Süper Lig =

Turkish football league

Trendyol Süper Lig
- Organising body: Turkish Football Federation (TFF)
- Founded: 21 February 1959; 67 years ago
- Country: Turkey
- Confederation: UEFA (Europe)
- Number of clubs: 18 (since 2025–26)
- Level on pyramid: 1
- Relegation to: 1. Lig
- Domestic cup: Turkish Super Cup
- League cup: Turkish Cup
- International cup(s): UEFA Champions League; UEFA Europa League; UEFA Conference League
- Current champions: Galatasaray (26th title) (2025–26)
- Most championships: Galatasaray (26 titles)
- Most appearances: Umut Bulut (515)
- Top scorer: Hakan Şükür (249)
- Broadcasters: List of broadcasters
- Sponsor: Trendyol
- Website: tff.org
- Current: 2026–27 Süper Lig

The Süper Lig (Turkish pronunciation: [ˈsypæɾ liɟ], Super League), also known as Trendyol Süper Lig for sponsorship reasons, is a professional association football league in Turkey and the highest level of the Turkish football league system. Eighteen teams compete, where a champion is decided and three clubs are promoted from, and another three relegated to the 1. Lig. The season runs from August to May, with each club playing 34 matches. Matches are played Friday through Monday.

Run by the Turkish Football Federation, the league succeeded the Turkish Football Championship and the National Division, both being former top-level national competitions. The Süper Lig is currently 9th in the UEFA coefficient ranking of leagues based on club performances in European competitions over the last five years. A total of 78 clubs have competed in the Süper Lig, but only 6 have won the title to date: Galatasaray (26), Fenerbahçe (19), Beşiktaş (16), Trabzonspor (7), Bursaspor (1) and Başakşehir (1).

== History ==
Football in Turkey stems back to the late 19th century, when Englishmen brought the game with them while living in Salonica (then part of the Ottoman Empire). The first league competition was the Istanbul Football League, which took place in the 1904–05 season. The league went through several variations until the creation of the Millî Lig (Süper Lig) in 1959. Between the creation of the Istanbul League and Millî Lig, several other regional leagues took place: Adana (1924), Ankara (1922), Eskişehir (1924), İzmir (1924), Bursa (1924), and Trabzon (1922), to name a few. The first competition to bring forth a national champion was the former Turkish Football Championship, which began in 1924 and continued until 1951. The championship format was based on a knockout competition, contested between the winners of each of the country's top regional leagues. The National Division (Turkish: Millî Küme) was the first national league competition in Turkey. Started in 1937, the National Division consisted of the strongest clubs from the Ankara, Istanbul, and İzmir leagues. The championship lasted until 1950.

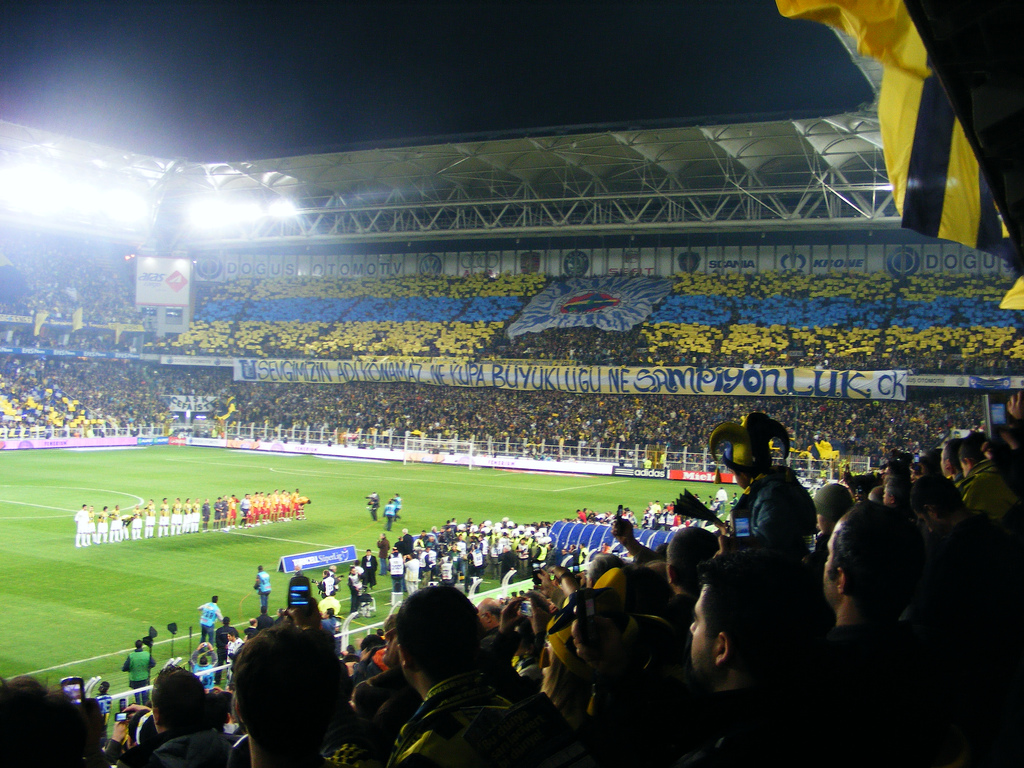
Fenerbahçe–Galatasaray match in the Şükrü Saracoğlu Stadium

In 1952 the TFF introduced professionalism in Turkish football. As a result, the former Turkish Football Championship lost its first level status. Since there was no top-level national champion in the period from 1952 to 1955, the Turkish federation sent Galatasaray, winners of the 1955–56 Istanbul League, to the European Cup in the 1956–57 season.

Protests of some Ankara and İzmir clubs regarding this decision, as well as UEFA deciding to only accept national champions to the European Cup from that season on induced the TFF to establish the Federation Cup in 1956. It is the first professional national football league in Turkey and the predecessor to the Super League (Millî Lig). The competition took place as a knock-out tournament to decide a national champion. This champion would go on to participate in the European Cup. The competition was held for two seasons until it was replaced by the Millî Lig. Beşiktaş won both editions and qualified for the European Cup during the two-year span. However, since the TFF failed to register their name for the draw in time, Beşiktaş could not participate in the 1957–58 season after all.

The top clubs of Ankara, Istanbul, and İzmir competed in the 1959 Turkish National League. The first season took place in the calendar year of 1959, instead of 1958 to 1959, since the qualifying stages took place in 1958. The 16 clubs who competed in the first season were: Adalet (Istanbul), Altay (İzmir), Ankaragücü (Ankara), Ankara Demirspor (Ankara), Beşiktaş (Istanbul), Beykoz (Istanbul), Karagümrük (Istanbul), Fenerbahçe (Istanbul), Galatasaray (Istanbul), Gençlerbirliği (Ankara), Göztepe (İzmir), Hacettepe Gençlik (Ankara), İstanbulspor, İzmirspor, Karşıyaka (İzmir), and Vefa (Istanbul). The first champions were Fenerbahçe and the first "Gol Kralı" (top scorer) was Metin Oktay. No clubs were promoted or relegated at the end of the first season.

The 2. Lig (Second League) was created at the start of the 1963–64 season and the Millî Lig became known as the 1.Lig (First League). Before the foundation of a second division, the bottom three clubs competed with regional league winners in a competition called the Baraj Games. The top three teams of the group were promoted to the Süper Lig. After the foundation of a new second division in 2001, known as the 1. Lig, the formerly titled 1. Lig was rebranded as Süper Lig. The Süper Lig is home of the Fenerbahçe–Galatasaray derby, the most watched football game in Turkey. It is considered to be one of the best and most intense in the world, being ranked among the greatest football rivalries of all time by various international sources.

On 12 December 2023, the Turkish Football Federation suspended all league games indefinitely following an incident during a match between MKE Ankaragücü and Caykur Rizespor which involved fans being able to successfully invade the pitch and people, including recent MKE Ankaragücü president Faruk Koca, being arrested after attacking referee Halil Umut Meler. Koca would resign from MKE Ankaragücü as well. However, on 13 December, the same day Meler was discharged from the hospital it was soon agreed that Super Lig matches would resume on 19 December.

== Format ==
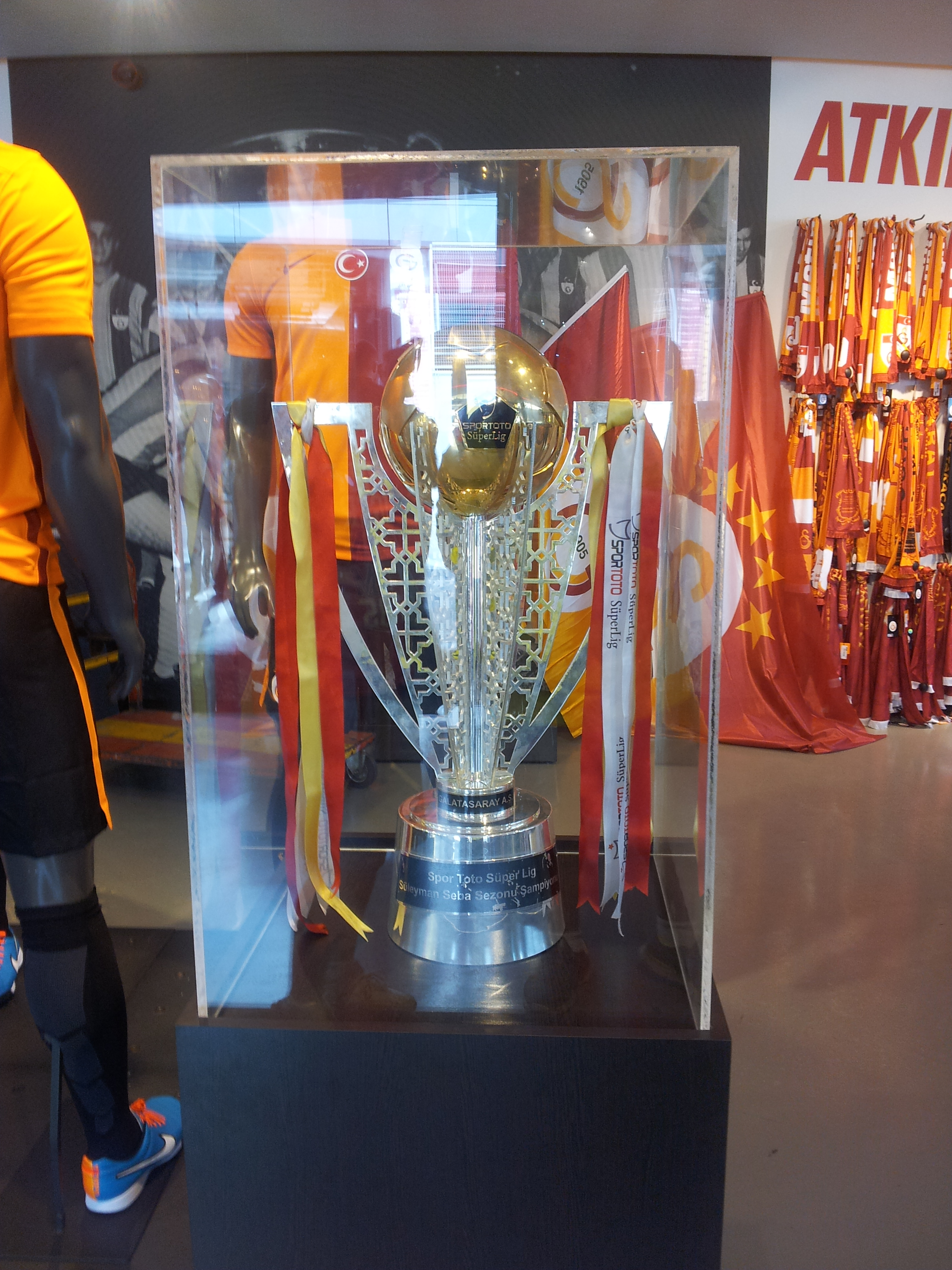
The Süper Lig championship trophy, used from 2014–15 until 2023–24 (except for centennial version during the 2022–23 season)

There were 18 clubs in the Süper Lig until 2020. 20 Clubs competed in the Süper Lig starting from 2020. During the course of the season (from August to May) each club plays the others twice (a double round robin system), once at their home stadium and once at that of their opponents, for a total of 34-38 games. Teams receive three points for a win and one point for a draw. No points are awarded for a loss. Teams are ranked by total points, then head-to-head record, then goal difference, and then goals scored. At the end of each season, the club with the most points is crowned champion. If points are equal, the head-to-head record and then goal difference determine the winner. The three lowest placed teams are relegated to the 1. Lig and the top two teams from the 1. Lig, together with the winner of play-offs involving the third to seventh placed 1. Lig clubs are promoted in their place.

- 16 clubs: 1959
- 20 clubs: 1959–1962
- 22 clubs: 1962–1963
- 18 clubs: 1963–1964
- 16 clubs: 1964–1966
- 17 clubs: 1966–1968
- 16 clubs: 1968–1981
- 17 clubs: 1981–1982
- 18 clubs: 1982–1985
- 19 clubs: 1985–1987
- 20 clubs: 1987–1988
- 19 clubs: 1988–1989
- 18 clubs: 1989–1990
- 16 clubs: 1990–1994
- 18 clubs: 1994–2020
- 21 clubs: 2020–2021
- 20 clubs: 2021–2022
- 19 clubs: 2022–2023
- 20 clubs: 2023–2024
- 19 clubs: 2024–2025
- 18 clubs: 2025–present

=== Qualification for European competitions ===
The champions and runners-up qualify for the second qualifying round of the Champions League. The third place and the Turkish Cup winners qualify for the second qualifying round of the Europa Conference League. If the Turkish Cup winner has already qualified for European competition through their league finish, then the team that finishes fourth in the league takes their place.

== Media coverage ==
=== Domestic ===
==== 2016–2021: Record deal with beIN Sports ====
On 28 November 2016 Qatari media group beIN (owner of Digiturk since 2015) won a 5-year deal to become the TV tender of the Süper Lig. They won the rights with a record offer worth $500M per season. Digiturk continued to offer the sports content with beIN's support.

Before the start of the 2019–20 season, due to the wild fluctuations in value of the Turkish lira, beIN seek to renegotiate the fees for the upcoming season. The broadcaster settled on a $410 million agreement with the TFF.

On 18 November 2020, after originally signing a deal (in 2016) where the annual fees were split evenly between Turkish lira and US dollars, the wild fluctuations in value of the Turkish lira saw beIN seek to renegotiate the fees for the Süper Lig. The new reduced fee (₺2.65 billion/$340 million) had to be paid exclusively in Turkish lira, and took into account the financial realities of the COVID-19 crisis. Despite a drop in overall value, the Süper Lig's TV rights income remained the sixth highest in Europe.

Due to the several negotiations and currency fluctuations, the 2021–22 season's deal was decreased to $215 million.

==== 2022–2024: new two year deal with beIN ====
On 24 June 2022 TFF and beIN agreed a new two-year deal of the TV rights for an annual deal of ₺2.2 billion.

==== 2024–2027: contract renewal ====
On 2 March 2024 Turkish Football Federation stated that Qatari media group beIN has renewed its rights to broadcast Turkey's top flight matches for three more years, until 2027. beIN will pay $182 million-a-year to broadcast Turkey's Süper Lig and TFF First League. As such, Süper Lig becomes the 6th most valuable football league after the Big Five leagues in Europe.

== UEFA ranking ==
As of April 5, 2026

Süper Lig ranks 9th in UEFA Country Rankings 2026. The league made a big breakthrough in the early 90s and became one of the most valuable leagues in Europe. Süper Lig achieved the best ranking in its history in 2001 by rising to 7th place. In 1982, the league dropped to 28th place, achieving the worst ranking in its history.

Ranking			Member association	Coefficient					
2025	2026	Mvmt	Member association	2021–22	2022–23	2023–24	2024–25	2025–26	Total
8	8	–	(Belgium) Royal Belgian Football Association	6.600	14.200	14.200	15.650	11.400	62.250
10	9	+1	(Turkey) Turkish Football Federation	6.700	11.800	12.000	10.300	11.075	51.875
9	10	-1	Football Association of the Czech Republic	6.700	6.750	13.500	10.550	11.025	48.525

Süper Lig UEFA ranking by years
1960	1961	1962	1963	1964	1965	1966	1967	1968	1969
18	▼19	▼20	▲19	▲15	▼18	▼19	▼21	21	▼22
1970	1971	1972	1973	1974	1975	1976	1977	1978	1979
▲18	▼19	▲17	▼18	▼19	▼23	23	23	▲22	▼23
1980	1981	1982	1983	1984	1985	1986	1987	1988	1989
▼25	25	▼28	▲27	▲26	▼27	▲26	▲24	▼26	▲24
1990	1991	1992	1993	1994	1995	1996	1997	1998	1999
24	▲23	▲18	▲13	▲12	▲10	▼11	▲8	▼14	14
2000	2001	2002	2003	2004	2005	2006	2007	2008	2009
▲11	▲7	▼8	▼10	10	▼11	▼15	▲14	▲11	11
2010	2011	2012	2013	2014	2015	2016	2017	2018	2019
11	▲10	▼11	▲10	▼11	▼12	▲11	▲10	10	10
2020	2021	2022	2023	2024	2025	2026	2027	2028	2029
▼11	▼13	▼20	▲12	▲9	▼10	▲9			

== Clubs ==
=== Stadiums and locations ===
Location of teams in 2026–27 Süper Lig
Clubs located in Istanbul

Team	Home city/borough	Home province	Stadium	Capacity
Alanyaspor	Alanya	Antalya	Alanya Oba Stadium	9,789
Amedspor	Diyarbakır	Diyarbakır	Diyarbakır Stadium	30,480
Başakşehir	Başakşehir	Istanbul	Başakşehir Fatih Terim Stadium	17,067
Beşiktaş	Beşiktaş	Istanbul	Tüpraş Stadium	42,684
Çorum	Çorum	Çorum	Çorum City Stadium	13,119
Erzurumspor	Erzurum	Erzurum	Kazım Karabekir Stadium	20,347
Eyüpspor	Eyüpsultan	Istanbul	Recep Tayyip Erdoğan Stadium	13,797
Fenerbahçe	Kadıköy	Istanbul	Chobani Stadium	47,911
Galatasaray	Sarıyer	Istanbul	Rams Park	53,387
Gaziantep	Gaziantep	Gaziantep	Gaziantep Stadium	30,320
Gençlerbirliği	Yenimahalle	Ankara	Eryaman Stadium	20,672
Göztepe	Göztepe	İzmir	Gürsel Aksel Stadium	23,376
Kasımpaşa	Kasımpaşa	Istanbul	Recep Tayyip Erdoğan Stadium	13,797
Kocaelispor	İzmit	Kocaeli	Kocaeli Stadium	34,829
Konyaspor	Konya	Konya	Konya Metropolitan Municipality Stadium	41,135
Rizespor	Rize	Rize	Rize City Stadium	14,879
Samsunspor	Samsun	Samsun	Samsun 19 Mayıs Stadium	34,346
Trabzonspor	Trabzon	Trabzon	Papara Park	41,061

== Champions ==
Only six clubs have been champions since the introduction of the Super League: Galatasaray 26 times, Fenerbahçe 19 times, Beşiktaş 16 times (see note below), Trabzonspor 7 times, and Bursaspor and Başakşehir once each.

Teams in bold compete in the Süper Lig as of the 2026–27 season.

Club	Champions	Runners-up	Winning seasons	Runners-up seasons
**Galatasaray**	26	13	1961–62, 1962–63, 1968–69, 1970–71, 1971–72, 1972–73, 1986–87, 1987–88, 1992–93, 1993–94, 1996–97, 1997–98, 1998–99, 1999–00, 2001–02, 2005–06, 2007–08, 2011–12, 2012–13, 2014–15, 2017–18, 2018–19, 2022–23, 2023–24, 2024–25, 2025–26	1956–57^{1}, 1957–58^{1}, 1959, 1960–61, 1965–66, 1974–75, 1978–79, 1985–86, 1990–91, 2000–01, 2002–03, 2013–14, 2020–21
**Fenerbahçe**	19	27	1959, 1960–61, 1963–64, 1964–65, 1967–68, 1969–70, 1973–74, 1974–75, 1977–78, 1982–83, 1984–85, 1988–89, 1995–96, 2000–01, 2003–04, 2004–05, 2006–07, 2010–11, 2013–14	1959–60, 1961–62, 1966–67, 1970–71, 1972–73, 1975–76, 1976–77, 1979–80, 1983–84, 1989–90, 1991–92, 1993–94, 1997–98, 2001–02, 2005–06, 2007–08, 2009–10, 2011–12, 2012–13, 2014–15, 2015–16, 2017–18, 2021–22, 2022–23, 2023–24, 2024–25, 2025–26
**Beşiktaş**	16	14	1956–57^{1}, 1957–58^{1}, 1959–60, 1965–66, 1966–67, 1981–82, 1985–86, 1989–90, 1990–91, 1991–92, 1994–95, 2002–03, 2008–09, 2015–16, 2016–17, 2020–21	1962–63, 1963–64, 1964–65, 1967–68, 1973–74, 1984–85, 1986–87, 1987–88, 1988–89, 1992–93, 1996–97, 1998–99, 1999–00, 2006–07
**Trabzonspor**	7	9	1975–76, 1976–77, 1978–79, 1979–80, 1980–81, 1983–84, 2021–22	1977–78, 1981–82, 1982–83, 1994–95, 1995–96, 2003–04, 2004–05, 2010–11, 2019–20
**Başakşehir**	1	2	2019–20	2016–17, 2018–19
Bursaspor	1	—	2009–10	

^{1} Beşiktaş formally requested that championships won in the 1956–57 and 1957–58 editions of the Turkish Federation Cup be counted as Turkish Professional First Division championships to the Turkish Football Federation. The Cup was established in 1956 to find a national champion to represent Turkey, after UEFA decided that only national champions could participate in the European Cup. Beşiktaş had therefore earned the right to represent Turkey in the European Cup in the 1957–58 and 1958–59 seasons. The ruling on this matter was announced in a press release on 25 March 2002, which indicated that the championships won by Beşiktaş in the Federation Cup would be counted as national league championships.

=== Star rating system ===
The honor of Golden Stars was introduced in football to recognize sides that have won multiple championships or other honours by the display of gold stars on their team badges and jerseys. In Turkey, clubs are permitted to place a golden star above their crest for every five national championships won. As of the 2024–25 season, Galatasaray is permitted five golden stars and Fenerbahce and Besiktas are permitted three golden stars, and Trabzonspor are permitted one golden star to be placed above their crest on their jerseys.

== League participation ==
As of 2025, 77 clubs have participated. Note: The tallies below include up to the 2025–26 season. Teams denoted in bold are current participants.

- **68** seasons: **Beşiktaş**, **Fenerbahçe**, **Galatasaray**
- **54** seasons: Ankaragücü
- **52** seasons: **Trabzonspor**
- **50** seasons: Bursaspor
- **49** seasons: **Gençlerbirliği**
- **42** seasons: Altay
- **33** seasons: **Samsunspor**
- **32** seasons: **Göztepe**
- **31** seasons: Gaziantepspor,
- **30** seasons: Eskişehirspor, **Antalyaspor**
- **25** seasons: İstanbulspor, **Konyaspor**
- **24** seasons: **Rizespor**
- **22** seasons: Adanaspor, **Kasımpaşa**
- **21** seasons: Adana Demirspor, Denizlispor, **Kayserispor**, **Kocaelispor**
- **20** seasons:Boluspor
- **19** seasons: Sivasspor
- **18** seasons: **Başakşehir**
- **16** seasons: Karşıyaka
- **15** seasons: Mersin İdman Yurdu
- **14** seasons: Vefa, Zonguldakspor
- **13** seasons: Ankara Demirspor, Kayseri Erciyesspor, Sarıyer
- **12** seasons: PTT
- **11** seasons: Diyarbakırspor, Malatyaspor, Orduspor, Sakaryaspor, **Fatih Karagümrük**
- **10** seasons: Altınordu, İzmirspor, Kardemir Karabükspor, Şekerspor, **Alanyaspor**
- **9** seasons: Ankaraspor, Feriköy
- **8** seasons: Beykozspor, Giresunspor, Hacettepe Gençlik
- **7** seasons: Akhisarspor, **Gaziantep**
- **6** seasons: Manisaspor
- **5** seasons: Hatayspor, Vanspor, Yeni Malatyaspor, Zeytinburnuspor
- **4** seasons: Elazığspor
- **3** seasons: Aydınspor, Bakırköyspor, Çanakkale Dardanelspor, Erzurumspor,
- **2** seasons: Adalet, Akçaabat Sebatspor, Balıkesirspor, Beyoğluspor, Büyükşehir Belediye Erzurumspor, Hacettepe, Yeşildirek, Yozgatspor, **Eyupspor**
- **1** season: Bodrumspor, Bucaspor,, Kahramanmaraşspor, Kırıkkalespor, Pendikspor, Petrolofisi, Siirtspor, Ümraniyespor

== Player records ==
=== Most goals ===
Rank	Player	Goals	Apps	Rate
1	Hakan Şükür	249	489	0.51
2	Tanju Çolak	240	282	0.85
3	Hami Mandıralı	219	476	0.46
4	Metin Oktay	217	258	0.84
5	Aykut Kocaman	200	360	0.58
6	Feyyaz Uçar	191	376	0.51
7	Burak Yılmaz	188	327	0.57
8	Serkan Aykut	188	336	0.56
9	Umut Bulut	163	515	0.31
10	Fevzi Zemzem	146	305	0.48

As of 15 May 2021

=== Most appearances ===
Rank	Player	Apps	Years
1	Umut Bulut	515	1999–2011, 2012–2021
2	Oğuz Çetin	503	1981–2000
3	Rıza Çalımbay	494	1980–1996
4	Hakan Şükür	489	1987–2000, 2003–2008
5	Hami Mandıralı	476	1984–1998, 1999–2003
6	Kemal Yıldırım	475	1976–1995
7	Mehmet Nas	447	1997–2014
8	Fernando Muslera	443	2011–2025
9	Recep Çetin	437	1984–2001
10	Müjdat Yetkiner	429	1979–1995

As of 30 May 2025

- Bold denotes players still active in the league.
- All players are Turkish unless otherwise indicated.

== Sponsorship ==
Period	Sponsor	Brand
1959–1989	No sponsor	National League (Turkish: Millî Lig)
1989–2000	No sponsor	1. Futbol Ligi Turkish First Football League
2000–2005	No sponsor	Turkish Süper Lig
2005–2010	Turkcell	Turkcell Süper Lig
2010–2017	Spor Toto	Spor Toto Süper Lig
2017–2018	No sponsor	Süper Lig
2018–2019	Spor Toto	Spor Toto Süper Lig
2019–2021	No sponsor	Süper Lig
2021–2023	Spor Toto	Spor Toto Süper Lig
2023–present	Trendyol	Trendyol Süper Lig

== Official match ball ==
- 2008–2010: Nike Total 90 Omni
- 2010–2011: Nike Total 90 Tracer PL
- 2011–2012: Nike Seitiro, Nike Seitiro Hi-Vis
- 2012–2013: Nike Maxim
- 2013–2014: Nike Incyte
- 2014–2015: Nike Ordem 2
- 2015–2016: Nike Ordem 3
- 2016–2017: Nike Ordem 4
- 2017–2018: Nike Ordem 5
- 2018–2020: Nike Merlin
- 2020–2021: Adidas Uniforia
- 2021–2022: Adidas Conext 21 Pro
- 2022–2025: Puma Orbita
- 2025–2028: Adidas Tiro

== See also ==
- Turkish Football Championship
- Turkish National Division
- List of foreign Süper Lig players
- List of Süper Lig top scorers
- List of Turkish football champions
- Süper Lig all-time table
- Doping in association football (Galatasaray's doping practice)
