= Ülküspor =

Turkish football club

- Full name: Ülküspor Kulübü
- Founded: 1914
- Ground: İzmir Atatürk 2 numaralı saha
- Capacity: 500
- Chairman: Murat Çiloğlu
- Manager: Mehmet İncu
- League: İzmir Super Amateur League
- 2013–2014: 5th
Home colours	Away colours

Ülküspor is a Turkish football club from İzmir. The team was founded 1914 as Ülküspor.

Ülküspor was founded as the third club after Altay and Karşıyaka in İzmir in 1914. They played in second and third leagues for many years. Currently, Ülküspor plays in amateur leagues of İzmir since 1987.

== Stadium ==
Currently the team plays at local field in front of İzmir Atatürk Stadium.

== League participations ==
- TFF Second League: 1956–1972
- TFF Third League: 1972–1987
- Turkish Regional Amateur League : 1987–

== See also ==
- 1963–64 Turkish Second Football League
