= İzmir Demirspor =

Turkish football club

- Founded: 1955
- Ground: İzmir Alsancak Stadium, İzmir
- Capacity: 15,500
- Chairman: ?
- Manager: Ali Gumus
- League: Amatör Futbol Ligleri
Home colours	Away colours

İzmir Demirspor is a Turkish association football club from İzmir. The team was founded in 1955 and plays in blue kits.

Currently the club plays in the Amatör Futbol Ligleri.

== Stadium ==
Currently the team plays at the 15,500 capacity İzmir Alsancak Stadium.

== League participations ==
- TFF Second League: 1963–1964
- TFF Third League: ?

== See also ==
- 1963–64 Turkish Second Football League
