= Turkish Federation Cup =

Professional football league

The Turkish Federation Cup (Turkish: Federasyon Kupası) was the first professional national football league in Turkey and the predecessor to the Super League. It was organized by the Turkish Football Federation and was held in order to bring forth a national champion that would represent Turkey in the European Cup. It was held in 1956 and 1957. Beşiktaş won both editions.

== Winners ==
Year	Winners	Runners-up
1956–57	Beşiktaş	Galatasaray
1957–58	Beşiktaş	Galatasaray

== See also ==
- Turkish Football Championship
- Turkish National Division
- List of Turkish football champions
