= Yeşildirek S.K. =

Yeşildirek SK
- Full name: Yeşildirek Spor Kulübü
- Founded: 1951
- Ground: İBB Yenikapı Facility; Istanbul, Turkey
- Capacity: 1,000
- Chairman: Nevzat Kanık
- Manager: Davut Çiçenoğlu
- League: Istanbul 1st Amateur League 3rd Group
Home colours	Away colours

Yeşildirek Spor Kulübü, is a Turkish football club from the Yeşildirek neighbourhood located in the Fatih district of Istanbul, Turkey. Homeground of the club is the İBB Yenikapı Facility, which has a capacity of 1,000. The club colors are yellow and green.

== League participations ==
- Turkish Super League: 1961–63
- TFF First League: 1963–65
- TFF Second League*: 1970–72, 1984–87
- Amatör Futbol Ligleri: 1951-61, 1987-

*Note: Between the 1980-81 and 1983-84 seasons there was no TFF Second League
