= Turanspor =

Sports club in Ankara, Turkey

- Full name: Turan Spor Kulübü Anonim Şirketi
- Nickname: Kurtkayalar-Turancılar
- Founded: 1947
- Dissolved: 2017
- Ground: Polatlı İlçe Stadium, Ankara
- Capacity: 1,500
- Chairman: Orhan Kapelman
- Manager: Kenan Öztürk
- League: Bölgesel Amatör Lig
- Website: http://www.sekerspor.com.tr
Home colours	Away colours

Turanspor was a sports club in located in Ankara, Turkey. The football club played in the Bölgesel Amatör Lig before its dissolution.

== History ==
=== Şekerspor ===
The team was founded in 1947 under the name Şekerspor; It kept this name until 1958. In 2005, the club was bought by K&C Group, a construction company and the club transferred Sergen Yalçın.

In 2015 Club President Orhan Kapelman claimed that he has always been an "idealist", a name given to the members of the far-right Grey Wolves organization. The club stated that it will include only nationalist football players and coaches in its staff and changed its name to Turanspor, named after Turanism.

Turanspor withdrew from the Regional Amateur League in the 2015–2016 season.

After the club was removed from the Sugar Factory facilities, of which the club is a tenant, because it could not pay its debts, the club management could not find a place to stay and the club became history.

== Notable players ==
- (Turkey) Sergen Yalçın
- (Kyrgyzstan) Ruslan Amirov
- (Slovenia) Marko Simeunovič

== Previous names ==
- Şekerspor (1947–1958)
- Şeker Hilal (1958–1963)
- Şekerspor (1963–2005)
- Etimesgut Şekerspor (2005–2010)
- Beypazarı Şekerspor (2010–2012)
- Çamlıdere Şekerspor (2012–2013)
- Şekerspor (2013–2014)
- Tutap Şekerspor (2014–2015)
- Ankara Beypazari Turan Spor Kulübü Anonym Şirketi (2015–2017)

== League participations ==
- Super League: 1959–63, 1964–66, 1967–69, 1972–73, 1997–98
- 1st League: 1963–64, 1966–67, 1969–72, 1973–92, 1994–97, 1998–2003
- 2nd League: 1992–94, 2003–2005, 2006–2013
- 3r League: 2005–2006, 2013–15
- Regional Amateur League: 2015–2016
- Amateur League: 1947–59
- Ankara Regional Amateur League: 2016–17
