= Feriköy S.K. =

Turkish sports club

Feriköy Spor Kulübü is a Turkish sports club established in Feriköy neighbourhood of Şişli, Istanbul in 1927. They were playing at Turkish National Football League from 1959 to 1968. They fell to the Amateur league for economic difficulties after 1968. They finally qualified Regional Amateur League, which was played between 1991 and 1995 and almost disappeared until the 2010–11 season. when they qualified again, after finishing the 2nd Group of Istanbul Super Amateur League as 2nd. But, they finished 11th 11th Group of Regional Amateur League and relegated to Istanbul Super Amateur League.

At present the club shares the 3,000 viewer capacity Eyüp Stadium with Eyüpspor.

== League participations ==
- Turkish Super League: 1959–1968
- TFF First League: 1968–1973, 1982–1983
- TFF Second League: 1973–1975, 1984–1994, 1999–2000
- Turkish Regional Amateur League: 1958–1959, 1975–1982, 1983–1984, 1994–1999, 2000–18
