= İzmirspor =

Turkish football club

- Full name: İzmirspor Kulübü Derneği
- Founded: 9 September 1923; 101 years ago
- Ground: Karabağlar Yeşilyurt Sahası
- Capacity: 1,000
- Chairman: Nedim Topaloğlu
- Manager: Mithat Karabörk
- League: Turkish Regional Amateur League
- 2023–24: Turkish Regional Amateur League, Group IV, 5th of 15
- Website: https://izmirspor.com.tr
Home colours	Away colours

İzmirspor is а Turkish football club based in İzmir, Turkey.

== History ==
The club was founded as Altın Ay on 25 July 1923. Altın Ay merged with rivals Sakarya and formed İzmirspor on 28 November 1930. They are currently playing in the Turkish Regional Amateur League. The club's greatest achievement was to become runner-up in the former Turkish Football Championship in 1933. İzmirspor also has won the İzmir Football League five times.

== League participations ==
- Turkish Super League: 1958–67, 1968–69
- TFF First League: 1967–68, 1969–72, 1980–88, 1989–93, 1998–04
- TFF Second League: 1972–80, 1988–89, 1993–98, 2004–08
- TFF Third League: 2008–10
- Turkish Regional Amateur League: 2010–2016, 2018–
- İzmir Super Amateur League: 2016–18

== Honours ==
- Turkish Football Championship

Runners-up (1): 1933

- İzmir Football League

Winners (5): 1929–30, 1932–33, 1949, 1954–55, 1955–56

== Notable players ==
- Metin Oktay
