= Karşıyaka S.K. =

Turkish sports club

Karşıyaka
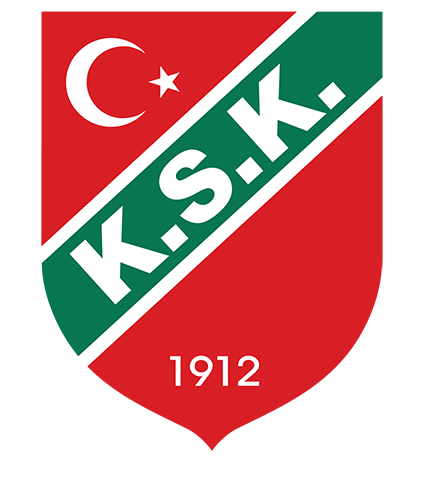
- Full name: Karşıyaka Spor Kulübü
- Nicknames: Kaf Sin Kaf; Kaf Kaf; The 35 and half
- Short name: KSK
- Founded: 1 November 1912; 114 years ago
- Ground: Alsancak Mustafa Denizli Stadium
- Capacity: 15,000
- Chairman: Yiğit Tusder
- Manager: Zafer Uysal
- League: TFF Third League
- 2025–26: TFF Third League, Group 4, 3rd
- Website: www.ksk.org.tr
Home colours	Away colours

Karşıyaka Spor Kulübü (Turkish for Karşıyaka Sports Club), better known as simply Karşıyaka, is a Turkish sports club located in Karşıyaka, İzmir. Founded in 1912, they are İzmir's oldest club and first Turkish sports club founded in Anatolia. Like others in Turkey, the "SK" suffix refers to the establishment being a sports club, as, besides football, the club has sports branches in basketball, volleyball, tennis, sailing and fencing. The club's football team currently competes in the TFF Third League, the fourth tier of the Turkish football league system. The basketball team currently competes in the Turkish Basketball League and the women's volleyball team in the Turkish Women's Second League.

Karşıyaka has a very large fanbase in Northern İzmir, and have a fierce rivalry with Göztepe; matches between the two teams are known as the İzmir Derby. Other rivalries are with Altay and Bucaspor.

== European participations ==
As of 29 September 1992

Statistics:

Competition	Pld	W	D	L	GF	GA	GD
Balkans Cup	2	1	0	1	5	6	–1

Pld = Matches played; W = Matches won; D = Matches drawn; L = Matches lost; GF = Goals for; GA = Goals against; GD = Goal Difference.

Balkans Cup:

Season	Round	Club	Home	Away	Aggregate
1992-93	Quarter-finals	(Bulgaria) Etar	4–1	1–5	5–6

== Current squad ==
As of For the 2026-27 season TFF Third League Group 4

Note: Flags indicate national team as defined under FIFA eligibility rules; some limited exceptions apply. Players may hold more than one non-FIFA nationality.

No.	Pos.	Nation	Player
1	GK	TUR	Sadri Ege Dipçi
2	DF	TUR	Mahmut Şat
5	MF	TUR	Efe Utku Özgan
6	MF	TUR	Alpay Eroğlu
7	FW	TUR	Tuğay Adamcıl
8	MF	TUR	Mücahit Aslan
9	FW	TUR	Eren Arda Şan
10	FW	TUR	Erhan Öztürk
11	MF	TUR	Yiğit Evin (on loan from Fenerbahçe)
17	FW	GER	Ömer Faruk Sezgin
19	DF	TUR	Mevlüt Can Kaynak
21	MF	TUR	Bartu Can Güngör
22	DF	TUR	Arda Baran Eren
23	DF	TUR	Hıdır Aytekin
28	MF	TUR	Enes Karakaş (on loan from Erzurumspor)

No.	Pos.	Nation	Player
30	DF	TUR	Aykut Çolakoğlu
33	DF	TUR	Gökdeniz Tandoğan
37	MF	TUR	Samet Seymen Sargın
41	DF	TUR	Erol Zöngür
54	DF	TUR	Muhammet Ensar Akgün
61	MF	TUR	Emircan Aytekin
70	FW	TUR	Veysel Karani Ünal (on loan from Alanyaspor)
84	GK	TUR	Ersen Batın Güler
93	DF	TUR	Selim Demirci
95	MF	TUR	Berat Şahin
96	FW	TUR	Fehmi Koç
98	GK	TUR	Burak Tuğ
99	FW	TUR	Fatih Taşdelen

== League participations in football ==
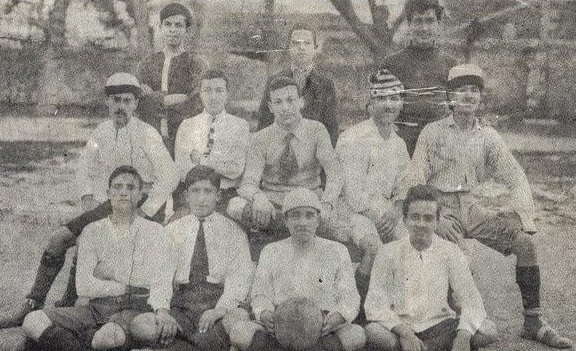
Karşıyaka in 1912.

- Turkish Premier Division: 1958–64, 1966–67, 1970–72, 1987–91, 1992–94, 1995–96
- Turkish First Division: 1964–66, 1967–70, 1972–73, 1980–87, 1991–92, 1994–95, 1996–01, 2003–2016
- Turkish Second Division: 1973–80, 2001–03, 2016–18
- Turkish Third Division: 2018–present

== See also ==
- Karşıyaka Basket
- Karşıyaka Women's Volleyball Team
- Göztepe-Karşıyaka rivalry
