= Beykoz S.K.D. =

Turkish sports club

Beykoz
- Founded: 1908; 118 years ago
- Arena: Recep Şahin Köktürk Spor Salonu
- Location: Beykoz, Istanbul, Turkey
- President: Zeki Aksu
- Championships: 1 Turkish Basketball Championship

Beykoz Spor Kulübü Derneği, today known for sponsorship reasons as TTNet Beykoz, is a Turkish sports club based in Beykoz, Istanbul. Their home arena is Beykoz stadium (Beykoz Stadyumu).

Beykoz was founded in 1908. Team colours are black and yellow.

The Beykoz football team played in the Turkish First League for eight seasons. The team played in the Third League as Beykozspor 1908 AŞ, which is the fourth level of Turkish football, and were promoted to the Second League in the 2007–08 season as champions.

The basketball section of the club have won the Turkish Basketball Championship in 1946. The first American basketball player in Turkey, Clev Cristy, was player of Beykoz in the 1961–62 season.

The team is sponsored by Türk Telekom Internet Service.

== Stadium renovations ==
Renovations to create a Beykoz area were announced, with the venue expected to open to the public in 2015, expanding the capacity to 10,000 spectators. As of 2024 there is no evidence that this work was completed.

== League participations for basketball ==
- First Level: 1988–1990 (as Sümerbank Beykozspor), 2005–2008
- Second Level: ?, 2008–2011
- Regional (Third) Level: 2011–

== Honours for basketball ==
- Turkish Basketball Championship
  - Winners (1): 1946

== League participations for football ==
- Turkish Super League: 1958–66
- TFF First League: 1966–71, 1972–79, 1980–84, 1986–91
- TFF Second League: 1971–72, 1979–80, 1984–86, 1991–01, 2007–2009
- TFF Third League: 2001–07, 2009–11
- Turkish Regional Amateur League: 2011–13
- Istanbul Super Amateur League: 2013–

Note: Beykozspor finished the Istanbul Super Amateur League 3rd Group in 11th place and relegated to Istanbul First Amateur League. But, they took place of İstanbul PTT and became Beykozspor 1908. They finished SAL 7th Group as 4th in 2014–15 season
