= Football records and statistics in Turkey =

This page details football records and statistics in Turkey.

== Süper Lig ==
Records in this section refer to Süper Lig from its introduction in 1959 through to the present.

=== Club records ===
==== Titles ====
- Most titles:

26, Galatasaray

- Most consecutive titles:
  - **4**, Galatasaray (1997–2000; 2023–2026)
  - 3, Galatasaray (1971–1973)
  - 3, Trabzonspor (1979–1981)
  - 3, Beşiktaş (1990–1992)
  - 2, Galatasaray (1962–1963; 1987–1988; 1993–1994; 2012–2013; 2018–2019)
  - 2, Beşiktaş (1957–1958; 1966–1967; 2016–2017)
  - 2, Fenerbahçe (1964–1965; 1974–1975; 2004–2005)

==== Most points per season ====
- **38 Matches (3 points per win)**

102, Galatasaray (2023–24)

- **38 Matches (2 points per win)**

65, Beşiktaş (1959–60)

- **42 Matches (2 points per win)**

68, Beşiktaş (1962–63)

- **30 Matches (2 points per win)**

48, Beşiktaş (1965–66)

- **32 Matches (2 points per win)**n

49, Fenerbahçe (1967–68)

- **34 Matches (2 points per win)**

50, Trabzonspor (1983–84)
50, Fenerbahçe (1984–85)
50, Beşiktaş (1984–85)

- **36 Matches (2 points per win)**

56, Beşiktaş (1985–86)
56, Galatasaray (1985–86)

- **36 Matches (3 points per win)**

95, Galatasaray (2024–25)

- **30 Matches (3 points per win)**

76, Beşiktaş (1991–92)

- **34 Matches (3 points per win)**

85, Beşiktaş (2002–03)

- **40 Matches (3 points per win)**

86, Galatasaray (2011–12)

- **16 Matches (2 points per win)**

28, Fenerbahçe (1959)

==== Top flight appearances ====
- Most appearances: 67, joint record

Beşiktaş (1959–present)
Fenerbahçe (1959–present)
Galatasaray (1959–present)

==== Rounds completed in leading position ====
- Most rounds:

662, Galatasaray
588, Fenerbahçe
440, Beşiktaş
240, Trabzonspor

As of 15 March 2026

==== Representation ====
- Most participants from a city:

In the 1962–63 season, Istanbul had 11 entrants in the top-flight: Beşiktaş, Beykoz, Beyoğlu, Fenerbahçe, Feriköy, Galatasaray, İstanbulspor, Karagümrük, Kasımpaşa, Vefa, and Yeşildirek.

==== Wins ====
- **Most total wins in history**

1315, Galatasaray since beginning of Süper Lig in 1959

- **Most wins in a season**

33, Galatasaray (2023–24) (38 matches)

- **Most consecutive wins**

17, Galatasaray (20th week 2023-24 to 36th week 2023-24)

- **Most consecutive home wins**

25, Galatasaray (34th week 2000–01 to 16th week 2002–03)

- **Most consecutive away wins**

17, Galatasaray (21st week 2023-24 to 18th week 2024-25)

- **Fewest wins in a season**, joint record

2, Diyarbakırspor, 1981–82 (32 matches)
2, Konyaspor, 1992–93 (30 matches)
2, Zeytinburnu, 1996–97 (34 matches)
2, Adanaspor, 2000–01 (34 matches)
2, Ankaragücü, 2011–12 (34 matches)

==== Draws ====
- **Most draws in a season**

18, Ankaragücü, 1982–83 (34 matches)

- **Fewest draws in a season**, joint record

2, Fenerbahçe, 1991–92 (30 matches)
2, Eskişehirspor, 1995–96 (34 matches)
2, Fenerbahçe, 2004–05 (34 matches)

==== Losses ====
- **Most losses in a season**

28, Kardemir Karabükspor, 2017–18 (34 matches)

- **Fewest defeats in a season**

0, Galatasaray, 1985–86 (36 matches)
0, Beşiktaş, 1991–92 (30 matches)

==== Goals ====
- **Most goals scored in a season**

105, Galatasaray, 1962–63 (42 matches)
103, Fenerbahçe, 1988–89 (36 matches)

- **Fewest goals scored in a season**, joint record

6, İstanbulspor, 1959 (14 matches)

- **Most goals conceded in a season**

91, Adanaspor, 2000–01 (34 matches)

- **Fewest goals conceded in a season**

6, Fenerbahçe, 1969–70 (30 matches)

- **Best goal difference in a season**

+76, Fenerbahçe, 1988–89 (36 matches)
+70, Galatasaray, 1962–63 (42 matches)

- **Worst goal difference in a season**

-66, Kardemir Karabükspor, 2017–18 (34 matches)

- **Most consecutive games scoring**

39, Galatasaray, (9 August 1997 – 21 November 1998)

==== Scorelines ====
- **Most goals scored in a single game**

12, Fenerbahçe 8–4 Gaziantepspor, 1991–92

- **Biggest home win**

Beşiktaş 10–0 Adana Demirspor, 1989–90

- **Biggest away win**

Ankaragücü 0–8 Galatasaray, 1992–93

==== Unbeaten ====
- **Longest unbeaten run**

48, Beşiktaş, 26th week 1990–91 to 13th week 1992–93

- **Longest home unbeaten run**

90, Trabzonspor 10th week 1975–76 to 8th week 1981–82

- **Longest away unbeaten run**

40, Galatasaray, 19th week 1997–98 to 31st week 1999–2000

==== Attendance ====
- **Highest attendance**
  - **76,127** Beşiktaş JK vs Galatasaray SK (at Atatürk Olympic Stadium 22 September 2013)
  - 71,334 Galatasaray SK vs Fenerbahçe SK (at Atatürk Olympic Stadium 21 September 2003)

=== Individual records ===
==== Youngest players ====
Rank	Player	Age	Club	Date	Opponent
1	(Turkey) Çetin Öten	14 years, 223 days	Şekerspor	19 November 1972	Eskişehirspor
2	(Turkey) Caner Bozkurt	14 years, 365 days	Adanaspor	18 April 2004	Çaykur Rizespor
3	(Turkey) Muhammet Yılmaz	15 years, 33 days	Zonguldakspor	12 October 1986	Eskişehirspor
4	(Turkey) Fehmi Koç	15 years, 118 days	Antalyaspor	24 December 2018	Fenerbahçe
5	(Turkey) Gürhan Gürsoy	15 years, 194 days	Adanaspor	6 April 2003	Fenerbahçe
6	(Turkey) Emre Demir	15 years, 214 days	Kayserispor	17 August 2019	Alanyaspor
7	(Turkey) Mevlüt Han Ekelik	15 years, 221 days	Antalyaspor	24 July 2020	Galatasaray
8	(Turkey) Ender Konca	15 years, 229 days	Kasımpaşa	8 June 1963	Gençlerbirliği
8	(Turkey) Mehmet Kaplan	15 years, 229 days	Sarıyer	13 September 1987	Zonguldakspor
9	(Turkey) Umut Salgınoğlu	15 years, 276 days	Adanaspor	4 October 2003	Gençlerbirliği
10	(Turkey) Furkan Özcan	15 years, 312 days	Gençlerbirliği SK	9 August 2025	Samsunspor

==== All-time most appearances ====
Rank	Player	Apps	Years
1	Umut Bulut	515	1999–2011, 2012–2021
2	Oğuz Çetin	503	1981–2000
3	Rıza Çalımbay	494	1980–1996
4	Hakan Şükür	489	1987–2000, 2003–2008
5	Hami Mandıralı	476	1984–1998, 1999–2003
6	Kemal Yıldırım	475	1976–1995
7	Mehmet Nas	447	1997–2014
8	Fernando Muslera	443	2011–2025
9	Recep Çetin	437	1984–2001
10	Müjdat Yetkiner	429	1979–1995

As of 30 May 2025. (Bold denotes players still playing in the league).

==== Goals ====
- **Youngest goalscorer**

Rank	Player	Age	Club	Date	Opponent
1	(Turkey) Emre Demir	15 years, 298 days	Kayserispor	9 November 2019	Gençlerbirliği
2	(Turkey) Enes Ünal	16 years, 107 days	Bursaspor	25 August 2013	Galatasaray
3	(Turkey) Batuhan Karadeniz	16 years, 123 days	Beşiktaş JK	25 August 2007	Gaziantepspor
4	(Turkey) Serkan Bakan	16 years, 152 days	Gaziantepspor	2 June 2017	Antalyaspor

- Most goals scored in a single game in Süper Lig: **6** goals – (Turkey) Tanju Çolak (1992–93)
- Longest scoring run in Süper Lig: **13** games – (Argentina) Mauro Icardi (2023–24).

==== Goalkeepers ====
- Longest consecutive run without conceding a goal: 12 games (1,112 minutes), Şenol Güneş

==== Most championships by manager ====
Name	Titles	Winning years
(Turkey) Fatih Terim	8	1997, 1998, 1999, 2000, 2012, 2013, 2018, 2019
(Turkey) Okan Buruk	5	2020, 2023, 2024, 2025, 2026
(Turkey) Ahmet Suat Özyazıcı	4	1976, 1977, 1980, 1984
(England) Gordon Milne	3	1990, 1991, 1992
(Turkey) Mustafa Denizli	3	1988, 2001, 2009
(Germany) Christoph Daum	3	1995, 2004, 2005
(Turkey) Gündüz Kılıç	2	1962, 1963
(Socialist Federal Republic of Yugoslavia) Ljubiša Spajić	2	1966, 1967
(Hungary) Ignác Molnár	2	1959, 1968
(England) Brian Birch	2	1972, 1973
(Brazil) Didi	2	1974, 1975
(Socialist Federal Republic of Yugoslavia) Tomislav Kaloperović	2	1969, 1978
(Turkey) Özkan Sümer	2	1979, 1981
(Socialist Federal Republic of Yugoslavia) Branko Stanković	2	1983, 1986
(Socialist Federal Republic of Yugoslavia) Todor Veselinović	2	1985, 1989
(Romania) Mircea Lucescu	2	2002, 2003
(Turkey) Şenol Güneş	2	2016, 2017
(Hungary) József Mészáros	1	1957
(Italy) Leandro Remondini	1	1958
(Hungary) András Kuttik	1	1960
(Hungary) László Székely	1	1961
(Socialist Federal Republic of Yugoslavia) Miroslav Kokotović	1	1964
(England) Oscar Hold	1	1965
(Romania) Traian Ionescu	1	1970
(Turkey) Coşkun Özarı	1	1971
(Socialist Federal Republic of Yugoslavia) Đorđe Milić	1	1982
(Germany) Jupp Derwall	1	1987
(Germany) Karl-Heinz Feldkamp	1	1993
(Germany) Reiner Hollmann	1	1994
(Brazil) Carlos Alberto Parreira	1	1996
(Belgium) Eric Gerets	1	2006
(Brazil) Zico	1	2007
(Turkey) Cevat Güler	1	2008
(Turkey) Ertuğrul Sağlam	1	2010
(Turkey) Aykut Kocaman	1	2011
(Turkey) Ersun Yanal	1	2014
(Turkey) Hamza Hamzaoğlu	1	2015
(Turkey) Sergen Yalçın	1	2021
(Turkey) Abdullah Avcı	1	2022

==== Most championships by player ====
(at least 5 titles)

Titles	Name	Winning years	Club(s)
8	(Turkey) Bülent Korkmaz	1988, 1993, 1994, 1997, 1998, 1999, 2000, 2002	all with Galatasaray
8	(Turkey) Suat Kaya	1987, 1993, 1994, 1997, 1998, 1999, 2000, 2002	all with Galatasaray
8	(Turkey) Hakan Şükür	1993, 1994, 1997, 1998, 1999, 2000, 2006, 2008	all with Galatasaray
8	(Uruguay) Fernando Muslera	2012, 2013, 2015, 2018, 2019, 2023, 2024, 2025	all with Galatasaray
7	(Turkey) Arif Erdem	1993, 1994, 1997, 1998, 1999, 2000, 2002	all with Galatasaray
7	(Turkey) Okan Buruk	1993, 1994, 1997, 1998, 1999, 2000, 2008	all with Galatasaray
6	(Turkey) Uğur Köken	1962, 1963, 1969, 1971, 1972, 1973	all with Galatasaray
6	(Turkey) Şenol Güneş	1976, 1977, 1979, 1980, 1981, 1984	all with Trabzonspor
6	(Turkey) Necati Özçağlayan	1976, 1977, 1979, 1980, 1981, 1984	all with Trabzonspor
6	(Turkey) Güngör Şahinkaya	1976, 1977, 1979, 1980, 1981, 1984	all with Trabzonspor
6	(Turkey) Turgay Semercioğlu	1976, 1977, 1979, 1980, 1981, 1984	all with Trabzonspor
6	(Turkey) Rıza Çalımbay	1982, 1986, 1990, 1991, 1992, 1995	all with Beşiktaş
6	(Turkey) Tugay Kerimoğlu	1988, 1993, 1994, 1997, 1998, 1999	all with Galatasaray
6	(Turkey) Ergün Penbe	1997, 1998, 1999, 2000, 2002, 2006	all with Galatasaray
6	(Turkey) Emre Belözoğlu	1997, 1998, 1999, 2000, 2011, 2014	Galatasaray (4), Fenerbahçe (2)
6	(Turkey) Sabri Sarıoğlu	2002, 2006, 2008, 2012, 2013, 2015	all with Galatasaray
5	(Turkey) Serdar Bali	1976, 1977, 1979, 1980, 1982	Trabzonspor (4), Beşiktaş (1)
5	(Turkey) Kadir Akbulut	1982, 1986, 1990, 1991, 1992	all with Beşiktaş
5	(Turkey) Ali Gültiken	1986, 1990, 1991, 1992, 1995	all with Beşiktaş
5	(Turkey) Gökhan Keskin	1986, 1990, 1991, 1992, 1995	all with Beşiktaş
5	(Turkey) Metin Tekin	1986, 1990, 1991, 1992, 1995	all with Beşiktaş
5	(Turkey) Ulvi Güveneroğlu	1986, 1990, 1991, 1992, 1995	all with Beşiktaş
5	(Turkey) Hayrettin Demirbaş	1987, 1988, 1993, 1994, 1997	all with Galatasaray
5	(Turkey) Hakan Ünsal	1997, 1998, 1999, 2000, 2002	all with Galatasaray
5	(Turkey) Sergen Yalçın	1992, 1995, 2000, 2002, 2003	Beşiktaş (3), Galatasaray (2)
5	(Turkey) Hasan Şaş	1999, 2000, 2002, 2006, 2008	all with Galatasaray
5	(Turkey) Rüştü Reçber	1996, 2001, 2005, 2007, 2009	Fenerbahçe (4), Beşiktaş (1)
5	(Turkey) Volkan Demirel	2004, 2005, 2007, 2011, 2014	all with Fenerbahçe
5	(Turkey) Selçuk Şahin	2004, 2005, 2007, 2011, 2014	all with Fenerbahçe
5	(Turkey) Hakan Balta	2008, 2012, 2013, 2015, 2018	all with Galatasaray
5	(Turkey) Selçuk İnan	2012, 2013, 2015, 2018, 2019	all with Galatasaray

== Turkish Football Championship (1924–1951) ==
Records and statistics in this section refer to the former Turkish Football Championship that was held from 1924 to 1951.

=== Titles ===
- Most titles: 3, joint record

Fenerbahçe
Harp Okulu

=== Appearances ===
- Most appearances: 8

Beşiktaş (1924, 1934, 1941, 1942, 1945, 1946, 1950, 1951)

=== Finals ===
- Most wins: 2

Fenerbahçe (1933, 1935)

- Most defeats: 3

Altınordu (1927, 1932, 1935)

- Biggest win:

İzmirspor 0–8 Fenerbahçe (1933)

- Most appearances: 3

Fenerbahçe (1933, 1935, 1940)

=== Scorelines ===
- Highest scoring games

18, Eskişehir Tayyare İdman Yurdu 17–1 Kütahya Türkspor (1932, Group stage)
15, Eskişehir Tayyare Yurdu 14–1 Giresun Hilâl Spor (1927, Preliminary round)
15, Altınordu 14–1 Antalya İlk Işık (1927, Quarter finals)
12, Balıkesir 12–0 Kütahya Gençlerbirliği (1927, Quarter finals)
12, Fenerbahçe 12–0 Adapazarı İdman Yurdu (1933, Group stage)
12, Harp Okulu 10–2 Trabzon Lisesi (1942, Final group)
12, Harp Okulu 11–1 Mersin İdman Yurdu (1944, Final group)

=== Unbeaten champions ===
Only the period from 1942 to 1951 is considered, as the Turkish championship was held as a knockout tournament before the 1942 edition. The following teams won the Turkish championship in a so-called final group, which was a national play-off of the top regional leagues:

- Harp Okulu (1942)
- Fenerbahçe (1944)
- Gençlerbirliği (1946)
- Ankara Demirspor (1947)
- Ankaragücü (1949)
- Beşiktaş (1951)

== National Division (1937–1950) ==
Records and statistics in this section refer to the former National Division (Turkish: Millî Küme) that was held from 1937 to 1950.

=== Club records ===
==== Titles ====
- Most titles: 6

Fenerbahçe

- Most consecutive titles: 2

Fenerbahçe (1945, 1946)

=== Individual records ===
==== All-time top scorers ====
Rank	Player	Goals	App.	Club(s)
1	Hakkı Yeten	95	118	Beşiktaş
2	Melih Kotanca	83	86	Güneş, Fenerbahçe
3	Şeref Görkey	75	107	Beşiktaş
4	Naci Bastoncu	56	117	Fenerbahçe
5	Said Altınordu	46	67	Altınordu
5	Selahattin Almay	46	61	Güneş, Galatasaray
7	Gündüz Kılıç	35	62	Galatasaray, Ankara Demirspor
8	Kemal Gülçelik	34	38	Beşiktaş
9	Şükrü Gülesin	33	64	Ankaragücü, Beşiktaş
10	Süleyman Tekil	32	47	Galatasaray, İstanbulspor

==== All-time most appearances ====
Rank	Player	App.	Club(s)
1	Cihat Arman	122	Fenerbahçe
2	Hakkı Yeten	118	Beşiktaş
3	Naci Bastoncu	117	Fenerbahçe
4	Hüseyin Saygun	110	Beşiktaş, Vefa
5	Şeref Görkey	107	Beşiktaş
6	Mehmet Ali Tanman	97	Beşiktaş
7	Faruk Barlas	96	Güneş, Galatasaray
8	Ömer Boncuk	90	Güneş, Fenerbahçe
9	Melih Kotanca	86	Güneş, Fenerbahçe
10	Ahmet Erol	78	Muhafızgücü, Gençlerbirliği, Fenerbahçe

== Turkish Cup ==
=== Club records ===
==== Finals ====
- Most wins: 19

Galatasaray (1963, 1964, 1965, 1966, 1973, 1976, 1982, 1985, 1991, 1993, 1996, 1999, 2000, 2005, 2014, 2015, 2016, 2019, 2025)

- Most consecutive titles: 4

Galatasaray (1963, 1964, 1965, 1966)

- Most consecutive appearances: 4

Galatasaray (1963, 1964, 1965, 1966 - winning all)
Trabzonspor (1975, 1976, 1977, 1978 - winning two)
Galatasaray (1993, 1994, 1995, 1996 - winning two)

- Most appearances: 24

Galatasaray (1963, 1964, 1965, 1966, 1969, 1973, 1976, 1980, 1982, 1985, 1991, 1993, 1994, 1995, 1996, 1998, 1999, 2000, 2005, 2014, 2015, 2016, 2019, 2025)

- Biggest win:

Gençlerbirliği 5–0 Eskişehirspor (1987)

- Most goals in a final: 8

Antalyaspor 3–5 Galatasaray (2000)

- Most goals by a losing side: 3

Antalyaspor 3–5 Galatasaray (2000)

- Most defeats in a final: 11

Fenerbahçe (1963, 1965, 1989, 1996, 2001, 2005, 2006, 2009, 2010, 2016, 2018)

==== Scorelines ====
- Biggest home win

14–2, İskenderun Demir Çelikspor vs Fidan Gençlik, Round 2, 1980–81

- Biggest away win

1–10, Uşak Belediyespor vs Denizli Belediyespor, Round 2, 2012–13

==== Unbeaten ====
- Longest unbeaten run: 26

Galatasaray, 1962–63 to 1/4 Finals 2nd leg 1966–67 vs Altay

=== Individual records ===
==== Players ====
- Most Turkish Cup wins: joint record

6, Bülent Korkmaz: 1991, 1993, 1996, 1999, 2000, 2005 (all with Galatasaray)
6, Hakan Şükür: 1988 (Sakaryaspor), 1993, 1996, 1999, 2000, 2005 (Galatasaray)

==== Managers ====
- Most Turkish Cup wins: joint record

3, Gündüz Kılıç, 1963, 1965, 1966 (all with Galatasaray)
3, Ahmet Suat Özyazıcı, 1977, 1978, 1984 (all with Trabzonspor)
3, Aykut Kocaman, 2012, 2013 (Fenerbahçe), 2017 (Konyaspor)
3, Fatih Terim, 1999, 2000, 2019 (all with Galatasaray)

== TFF Super Cup ==
=== Club records ===
- Most wins: 17

Galatasaray (1966, 1969, 1972, 1982, 1987, 1988, 1991, 1993, 1996, 1997, 2008, 2012, 2013, 2015, 2016, 2019, 2023)

- Most appearances: 27

Galatasaray (1966, 1969, 1971, 1972, 1973, 1976, 1982, 1985, 1987, 1988, 1991, 1993, 1994, 1996, 1997, 1998, 2006, 2008, 2012, 2013, 2014, 2015, 2016, 2018, 2019, 2023, 2024)

- Most consecutive wins: 5

Trabzonspor (1976, 1977, 1978, 1979, 1980)

- Most consecutive appearances: 7

Beşiktaş (1989, 1990, 1991, 1992, 1993, 1994, 1995)

- Biggest win:
  - Beşiktaş 5–0 Galatasaray (2024)

=== Individual records ===
==== Managers ====
- Most Turkish Super Cup wins: 5
  - Ahmet Suat Özyazıcı: 1976, 1977, 1978, 1980, 1983 (all with Trabzonspor)
  - Fatih Terim: 1996, 1997, 2012, 2013, 2019 (all with Galatasaray)

==== Players ====
- Most Turkish Super Cup wins: 6
  - Şenol Güneş: 1976, 1977, 1978, 1979, 1980, 1983 (all with Trabzonspor)
  - Turgay Semercioğlu: 1976, 1977, 1978, 1979, 1980, 1983 (all with Trabzonspor)
  - Necati Özçağlayan: 1976, 1977, 1978, 1979, 1980, 1983 (all with Trabzonspor)
  - Selçuk İnan: 2010 (Trabzonspor), 2012, 2013, 2015, 2016, 2019 (Galatasaray)
  - Fernando Muslera: 2012, 2013, 2015, 2016, 2019, 2023 (all with Galatasaray)

== The double ==
Four teams have won the Double of the Süper Lig and the Turkish Cup.

Club	Number	Seasons
Galatasaray	8	1962–63, 1972–73, 1992–93, 1998–99, 1999–2000, 2014–15, 2018–19, 2024–25
Fenerbahçe	3	1967–68, 1973–74, 1982–83
Beşiktaş	3	1989–90, 2008–09, 2020–21
Trabzonspor	2	1976–77, 1983–84

== Most successful clubs overall ==
As of 22 May 2026

local and lower league organizations are not included.

Club	Domestic Titles											Worldwide Titles			Overall titles
Club	Süper Lig	Turkish Football Championship	Turkish National Division	Turkish Federation Cup	Turkish Cup	Super Cup	Prime Minister's Cup	Atatürk Cup	Spor Toto Cup	50th Anniversary Cup	Total	UEFA Europa League	UEFA Super Cup	Balkans Cup	Overall titles
**Galatasaray**	**26**	-	1	-	**19**	**17**	5	-	-	**1**	**69**	**1**	**1**	-	**71**
**Fenerbahçe**	19	**3**	**6**	-	7	10	**8**	**1**	1	-	55	-	-	**1**	56
**Beşiktaş**	14	2	3	**2**	11	10	6	**1**	**3**	-	52	-	-	-	52
**Trabzonspor**	7	-	-	-	10	10	5	-	-	-	32	-	-	-	32
Ankaragücü	-	1	-	-	2	1	2	-	-	-	6	-	-	-	6
Eskişehirspor	-	-	-	-	1	1	3	-	-	-	5	-	-	-	5
**Gençlerbirliği**	-	2	-	-	2	-	-	-	-	-	4	-	-	-	4
Bursaspor	1	-	-	-	1	-	2	-	-	-	4	-	-	-	4
**Göztepe**	-	1	-	-	2	1	-	-	-	-	4	-	-	-	4
Harp Okulu	-	**3**	-	-	-	-	-	-	-	-	3	-	-	-	3
İstanbulspor	-	1	-	-	-	-	-	-	1	-	2	-	-	-	2
Altay	-	-	-	-	2	-	-	-	-	-	2	-	-	-	2
**Kocaelispor**	-	-	-	-	2	-	-	-	-	-	2	-	-	-	2
Akhisarspor	-	-	-	-	1	1	-	-	-	-	2	-	-	-	2
**Konyaspor**	-	-	-	-	1	1	-	-	-	-	2	-	-	-	2
Boluspor	-	-	-	-	-	-	2	-	-	-	2	-	-	-	2
**Samsunspor**	-	-	-	-	-	-	-	-	-	-	0	-	-	**1**	1
Sarıyer	-	-	-	-	-	-	-	-	-	-	0	-	-	**1**	1
Ankara Demirspor	-	1	-	-	-	-	-	-	-	-	1	-	-	-	1
**Başakşehir**	1	-	-	-	-	-	-	-	-	-	1	-	-	-	1
Eskişehir Demirspor	-	1	-	-	-	-	-	-	-	-	1	-	-	-	1
Güneş	-	-	1	-	-	-	-	-	-	-	1	-	-	-	1
Muhafızgücü	-	1	-	-	-	-	-	-	-	-	1	-	-	-	1
Kayserispor	-	-	-	-	1	-	-	-	-	-	1	-	-	-	1
Sakaryaspor	-	-	-	-	1	-	-	-	-	-	1	-	-	-	1
Sivasspor	-	-	-	-	1	-	-	-	-	-	1	-	-	-	1
İzmir Denizgücü	-	-	-	-	-	-	1	-	-	-	1	-	-	-	1
Mersin İdmanyurdu	-	-	-	-	-	-	1	-	-	-	1	-	-	-	1
Gaziantepspor	-	-	-	-	-	-	-	-	1	-	1	-	-	-	1
Türk Telekom	-	-	-	-	-	-	-	-	1	-	1	-	-	-	1

- The articles in italic indicate the defunct leagues and the defunct cups.
- The figures in **bold** indicate the most times this competition has been won by a team.
- Balkans Cup is not considered a UEFA competition, and hence clubs' records in the Balkans Cup are not considered part of their European record.

== Most successful managers overall (1959–present) ==
Manager	Süper Lig	Turkish Cup	Turkish Super Cup	UEFA Europa League	UEFA Super Cup	Total
(Turkey) Fatih Terim	**8**	**3**	**5**	**1**	0	17
(Turkey) Ahmet Suat Özyazıcı	4	**3**	**5**	0	0	12
(Turkey) Okan Buruk	5	2	1	0	0	7
(Turkey) Mustafa Denizli	3	2	2	0	0	7
(England) Gordon Milne	3	2	2	0	0	7
(Turkey) Gündüz Kılıç	2	**3**	1	0	0	6
(Germany) Christoph Daum	3	1	2	0	0	6
(Turkey) Şenol Güneş	2	2	2	0	0	6
(Brazil) Didi	2	1	2	0	0	5
(Turkey) Özkan Sümer	2	1	2	0	0	5
(Socialist Federal Republic of Yugoslavia) Branko Stanković	2	1	2	0	0	5
(England) Brian Birch	2	1	1	0	0	4
(Turkey) Aykut Kocaman	1	**3**	0	0	0	4
(Hungary) Ignác Molnár	2	1	1	0	0	4
(Socialist Federal Republic of Yugoslavia) Tomislav Kaloperović	2	1	1	0	0	4
(Romania) Mircea Lucescu	2	0	0	0	**1**	3
(Socialist Federal Republic of Yugoslavia) Ljubiša Spajić	2	0	1	0	0	3
(Socialist Federal Republic of Yugoslavia) Todor Veselinović	2	0	1	0	0	3
(Germany) Jupp Derwall	1	1	1	0	0	3
(Turkey) Hamza Hamzaoğlu	1	1	1	0	0	3
(Turkey) Abdullah Avcı	1	0	2	0	0	3
(Turkey) Adnan Suvari	0	2	1	0	0	3
(France) Jean Tigana	0	2	1	0	0	3
(Turkey) Coşkun Özarı	1	1	0	0	0	2
(Turkey) Necdet Niş	0	2	0	0	0	2
(Germany) Karl-Heinz Feldkamp	1	1	0	0	0	2
(Turkey) Samet Aybaba	0	2	0	0	0	2
(Socialist Federal Republic of Yugoslavia) Abdulah Gegić	0	1	1	0	0	2
(Turkey) Metin Türel	0	1	1	0	0	2
(Germany) Reiner Hollmann	1	0	1	0	0	2
(Turkey) Yılmaz Gökdel	0	1	1	0	0	2
(Wales) John Toshack	0	1	1	0	0	2
(Brazil) Zico	1	0	1	0	0	2
(Turkey) Sergen Yalçın	1	1	0	0	0	2
(Netherlands) Jan Olde Riekerink	0	1	1	0	0	2
(Hungary) András Kuttik	1	0	0	0	0	1
(Hungary) László Székely	1	0	0	0	0	1
(Socialist Federal Republic of Yugoslavia) Miroslav Kokotović	1	0	0	0	0	1
(England) Oscar Hold	1	0	0	0	0	1
(Socialist Federal Republic of Yugoslavia) Đorđe Milić	1	0	0	0	0	1
(Brazil) Carlos Alberto Parreira	1	0	0	0	0	1
(Belgium) Eric Gerets	1	0	0	0	0	1
(Turkey) Cevat Güler	1	0	0	0	0	1
(Turkey) Ertuğrul Sağlam	1	0	0	0	0	1
(Turkey) Ersun Yanal	1	0	0	0	0	1
(Turkey) Halil Bıçakçı	0	1	0	0	0	1
(Turkey) Ziya Taner	0	1	0	0	0	1
(Germany) Horst Buhtz	0	1	0	0	0	1
(Turkey) Fethi Demircan	0	1	0	0	0	1
(Turkey) Ayfer Elmastaşoğlu	0	1	0	0	0	1
(Belgium) Urbain Braems	0	1	0	0	0	1
(Scotland) Graeme Souness	0	1	0	0	0	1
(Germany) Holger Osieck	0	1	0	0	0	1
(Turkey) Hikmet Karaman	0	1	0	0	0	1
(Turkey) Ziya Doğan	0	1	0	0	0	1
(Romania) Gheorghe Hagi	0	1	0	0	0	1
(Turkey) Tolunay Kafkas	0	1	0	0	0	1
(Turkey) Tayfur Havutçu	0	1	0	0	0	1
(Italy) Roberto Mancini	0	1	0	0	0	1
(England) Eddie Newton	0	1	0	0	0	1
(Turkey) Serdar Topraktepe	0	1	0	0	0	1
(Turkey) İsmail Kartal	0	0	1	0	0	1
(Turkey) Ömer Kaner	0	0	1	0	0	1
(Germany) Michael Skibbe	0	0	1	0	0	1
(Turkey) Mustafa Reşit Akçay	0	0	1	0	0	1
(Bosnia and Herzegovina) Safet Sušić	0	0	1	0	0	1
(Netherlands) Giovanni van Bronckhorst	0	0	1	0	0	1
(Turkey) Önder Karaveli	0	0	1	0	0	1

- The figures in bold represent the most times this competition has been won by a manager.

== Süper Lig all-time table (1959–present) ==
The overall performances of 79 participant football clubs since the establishment of Süper Lig in 1959 are as follows: In this ranking 3 points are awarded for a win, 1 for a draw, and 0 for a loss, although the Süper Lig awarded 2 points for a win until the 1987–88 season.

As of 8 November 2026

Pos.	Team	Seasons	Last Season	Points	PPM	Pld	W	D	L	GF	GA	GD	1st	2nd	3rd	4th
1	Amed	1	2026–27	23	2,091	11	7	2	2	28	15	13				
2	Fenerbahçe	69	2026–27	4531	1,990	2277	1315	586	376	4140	2023	2117	19	27	8	5
3	Galatasaray	69	2026–27	4506	1,979	2277	1317	555	405	4093	2008	2085	26	11	16	3
4	Beşiktaş	69	2026–27	4297	1,889	2275	1227	616	432	3751	2000	1751	16	14	14	12
5	Trabzonspor	53	2026–27	3129	1,771	1767	884	477	406	2789	1766	1023	7	9	10	9
6	İst. Başakşehir	19	2026–27	1034	1,598	647	292	158	197	958	758	200	1	2	1	4
7	Çorum	1	2026–27	16	1,455	11	5	1	5	21	21	0				
8	Sivasspor	19	2024–25	916	1,367	670	244	184	242	908	932	-24		1		2
9	Eskişehirspor	30	2015–16	1314	1,344	978	334	312	332	1110	1101	9		3	2	2
10	Alanyaspor	11	2026–27	492	1,333	369	132	96	141	532	536	-4				
11	Bursaspor	50	2018–19	2189	1,332	1644	572	473	599	1965	1998	-33	1		1	2
12	Sarıyer	13	1996–97	579	1,328	436	148	135	153	553	551	2				3
13	Gaziantepspor	31	2016–17	1363	1,326	1028	366	265	397	1248	1383	-135			2	4
14	Malatyaspor	11	2005–06	504	1,313	384	134	102	148	507	544	-37			1	
15	Gençlerbirliği	50	2026–27	2116	1,279	1655	544	484	627	2074	2209	-135			2	
16	Kocaelispor	22	2026–27	915	1,273	719	240	195	284	897	981	-84				1
17	Göztepe	33	2026–27	1290	1,251	1031	324	318	389	1154	1277	-123			1	3
18	Kayserispor	21	2025–26	915	1,250	732	238	201	293	905	1056	-151				
19	Samsunspor	34	2026–27	1376	1,245	1105	364	284	457	1247	1469	-222			3	1
20	Boluspor	20	1991–92	791	1,240	638	192	215	231	637	709	-72			1	1
21	Altay	42	2021–22	1686	1,236	1364	422	420	522	1454	1667	-213			2	2
22	Konyaspor	26	2026–27	1069	1,230	869	273	250	346	1044	1222	-178			2	
23	Ankaragücü	54	2022–23	2176	1,227	1774	554	514	706	2035	2375	-340				4
24	Antalyaspor	30	2025–26	1267	1,218	1040	330	277	433	1230	1516	-286				
25	Zonguldakspor	14	1987–88	553	1,218	454	135	148	171	425	484	-59			1	1
26	Karagümrük	11	2025–26	448	1,217	368	116	100	152	473	509	-36				
27	Akhisar Belediyespor	7	2018–19	287	1,206	238	74	65	99	286	340	-54				
28	İstanbulspor	25	2022–23	1000	1,205	830	253	241	336	929	1088	-159				1
29	Feriköy	9	1967–68	350	1,199	292	88	86	118	257	310	-53				
30	Ankara Demirspor	13	1970–71	501	1,199	418	116	153	149	447	509	-62				
31	Kasımpaşa	23	2026–27	954	1,197	797	245	219	333	1009	1216	-207				
32	İzmirspor	10	1968–69	389	1,193	326	93	110	123	313	386	-73				1
33	Çaykur Rizespor	25	2026–27	999	1,182	845	267	198	380	981	1256	-275				
34	Beykozspor	8	1965–66	310	1,174	264	72	94	98	262	314	-52				1
35	Bakırköyspor	3	1992–93	105	1,167	90	28	21	41	131	135	-4				
36	Aydınspor	3	1992–93	105	1,167	90	26	27	37	105	140	-35				
37	Adanaspor	22	2016–17	819	1,163	704	202	213	289	771	949	-178		1		3
38	Orduspor	11	2012–13	408	1,159	352	102	102	148	303	420	-117				1
39	Denizlispor	21	2020–21	843	1,158	728	217	192	319	875	1057	-182				
40	Gaziantep	8	2026–27	309	1,157	267	79	72	116	334	413	-79				
41	Mersin İdmanyurdu	15	2015–16	542	1,148	472	136	134	202	445	556	-111				1
42	Sakaryaspor	11	2006–07	431	1,134	380	114	89	177	452	586	-134				
43	Karşıyaka	16	1995–96	597	1,131	528	152	141	235	533	748	-215				
44	Vefa	14	1973–74	473	1,121	422	110	143	169	364	514	-150			1	
45	Yozgatspor	2	2001–02	76	1,118	68	19	19	30	101	113	-12				
46	Giresunspor	8	2022–23	283	1,114	254	69	76	109	239	316	-77				
47	Adana Demirspor	21	2024–25	777	1,113	698	194	195	309	738	1018	-280				1
48	Ankaraspor	9	2017–18	339	1,108	306	84	87	135	348	460	-112				
49	Türk Telekom	12	1972–73	413	1,104	374	93	134	147	340	445	-105				
50	Keçiörengücü	8	1967–68	277	1,099	252	67	76	109	241	334	-93				
51	Eyüpspor	2	2026–27	89	1,099	81	24	17	40	88	125	-37				
52	Manisaspor	6	2012–13	223	1,093	204	58	49	97	242	306	-64				
53	Hatayspor	3	2024–25	204	1,085	188	53	45	90	229	322	-93				
54	Çanakkale Dardanelspor	3	1998–99	109	1,069	102	28	25	49	107	154	-47				
55	Karabükspor	10	2016–17	356	1,060	336	96	68	172	361	570	-209				
56	Altınordu	10	1969–70	338	1,050	322	80	98	144	296	433	-137				
57	Erzurumspor F.K.	3	2026–27	89	1,047	85	22	23	40	90	128	-38				
58	Yeni Malatyaspor	5	2021–22	187	1,039	180	47	46	87	205	266	-61				
59	Beyoğluspor	2	1963–64	56	1,037	54	13	17	24	49	72	-23				
60	Bodrum	1	2024–25	37	1,028	36	9	10	17	26	43	-17				
61	Kayseri Erciyesspor	13	2014–15	429	1,012	424	100	129	195	423	644	-221				
62	Elazığspor	4	2013–14	136	1,000	136	35	31	70	146	246	-100				
63	Şekerspor	10	1997–98	319	0,997	320	73	100	147	309	483	-174				
64	Diyarbakırspor	11	2009–10	357	0,986	362	91	84	187	323	554	-231				
65	Pendikspor	1	2023–24	37	0,974	38	9	10	19	42	73	-31				
66	Erzurumspor	3	2000–01	98	0,961	102	25	23	54	116	205	-89				
67	Balıkesirspor	2	2014–15	61	0,953	64	15	16	33	66	108	-42				
68	Yeşildirek	2	1962–63	55	0,948	58	13	16	29	51	94	-43				
69	Hacettepe	2	2008–09	62	0,912	68	15	17	36	54	99	-45				
70	Vanspor	5	1999–00	153	0,900	170	38	39	93	165	298	-133				
71	Akçaabat Sebatspor	2	2004–05	61	0,897	68	14	19	35	85	131	-46				
72	Zeytinburnuspor	5	1996–97	145	0,895	162	36	37	89	159	290	-131				
73	Adalet	2	1959–60	45	0,865	52	10	15	27	38	69	-31				
74	Petrolofisi	1	1994–95	29	0,853	34	8	5	21	38	73	-35				
75	Ümraniyespor	1	2022–23	30	0,833	36	7	9	20	47	64	-17				
76	Kırıkkalespor	1	1978–79	23	0,767	30	5	8	17	21	64	-43				
77	Bucaspor	1	2010–11	26	0,765	34	6	8	20	37	65	-28				
78	Siirtspor	1	2000–01	24	0,706	34	6	6	22	47	81	-34				
79	Kahramanmaraşspor	1	1988–89	23	0,639	36	4	11	21	22	71	-49				
	Total					20167	14549	5618	14549	50864	50864	0	70	68	68	68

Clubs currently play in the top division.

== Overall league positions (1959–present) ==
The overall list of league positions of 79 participant football clubs since the establishment of Süper Lig in 1959 are as follows:

As of 17 May 2026

Pos.	Team	Number of Seasons	Last Season	1st	2nd	3rd	4th	5th	6th	7th	8th	9th	10th	11th	12th	13th	14th	15th	16th	17th	18th	19th	20th	21st	22nd	Ave. Pos.
1	Fenerbahçe	68	2025-26	19	27	8	5	4	2	1	1		1													2,56
2	Galatasaray	68	2025-26	26	11	16	3	4	3		2	1		1		1										2,87
3	Beşiktaş	68	2025-26	14	14	14	12	5	5			2		2												3,34
4	Trabzonspor	52	2025-26	7	9	10	9	5	5	3		2			1		1									4,06
5	İst. Başakşehir	18	2025-26	1	2	1	4	3	1	1		1			3				1							6,28
6	Eskişehirspor	30	2015-16		3	2	2		3	3	2	4	2	2	2			2	1	2						8,57
7	Bursaspor	50	2018-19	1		1	2	5	9	1	4	5	7	1	2	5	2	1	3	1						9,06
8	Sarıyer	13	1996-97				3	1		1	1	2			2		1		2							9,23
9	Gaziantepspor	31	2016-17			2	4		2	2	3	2	3	3		4	2	2		2						9,58
10	Alanyaspor	10	2025-26					2		1	1	1		1	3			1								9,60
11	Sivasspor	19	2024-25		1		2	2		3	2		1		2		1	3	1	1						9,63
12	Altay	42	2021-22			2	2	3	5	5	3	3	2	4	3		1	3	2	1	3					9,69
13	Gençlerbirliği	49	2025-26			2		4	5	1	4	5	10	5	2		6	2		1		1	1			9,98
14	Göztepe	32	2025-26			1	3	3	2	4	2	1	2	1		3	4	2	1	2		1				10,00
15	Zonguldakspor	14	1987-88			1	1			1	2	1		3	1	2	1						1			10,29
16	Kocaelispor	21	2025-26				1	2	1	2	2	2	3	1	1	1	1		1	1	2					10,33
17	Aydınspor	3	1992-93					1						1				1								10,33
18	Bakırköyspor	3	1992-93						1					1			1									10,33
19	Samsunspor	33	2025-26			3	1	2	1	3	4	1	3		3	2	1	3	4	1		1				10,36
20	Malatyaspor	11	2005-06			1		1	1		1			1	1	2	2		1							10,45
21	Konyaspor	25	2025-26			2				2	5	3		4	2	1	1	1	3	1						10,48
22	Ankaragücü	54	2023-24				4	2	6	3	4	5	1	6	2	9	3	4	1	1	2	1				10,50
23	Eyüpspor	2	2025-26						1									1								10,50
24	Ankara Demirspor	13	1970-71					2			1		5	1	2			1				1				10,54
25	Boluspor	20	1991-92			1	1	1		3	1	1	1		1	3	5	1			1					10,70
26	Adanaspor	22	2016-17		1		3			1	2	1	2	2	2	2		1	1	2	2					10,86
27	İstanbulspor	25	2023-24				1	2	3	1	1	3	1		2	2	2	4	1	1			1			11,00
28	Kayserispor	21	2025-26					4	1	1	1	2	1	1		1	3	2		3	1					11,14
29	İzmirspor	10	1968-69				1			1	2				1	2		1	2							11,20
30	Ankaraspor	9	2017-18					1		1	1		2			1	1		1		1					11,22
31	Kasımpaşa	22	2025-26					1	2	1	1	1	4	2	2	3	2			1	2					11,23
32	Feriköy	9	1967-68							1	2		1	2	1					1	1					11,33
33	Akhisar Belediyespor	7	2018-19							1	1		1	1	1		1				1					11,43
34	Mersin İdmanyurdu	15	2015-16				1		1	3			1	2		1		3	1		2					11,53
35	Türk Telekom	12	1972-73							3		2	1	1			1		2	2						11,67
36	Adana Demirspor	21	2024-25				1		1	1	3	1	2		2	3	1	1	1	1	1	1	1			12,00
37	Orduspor	11	2012-13				1			1		1		2	1	1	1		1	1	1					12,00
38	Denizlispor	21	2020-21					2	1	3	1		1	1	1		2	4	1	3				1		12,10
39	Antalyaspor	30	2025-26					1	1	4		3	2	2	2	2	2	4	3	3	1					12,10
40	Sakaryaspor	11	2006-07					1	2				1	2					2	1	2					12,18
41	Vefa	14	1973-74			1			1				1	2	1	3	2		1		1	1				12,36
42	Beykozspor	8	1965-66				1					1			2		1		3							12,38
43	Giresunspor	8	2022-23						1			1			3				3							12,38
44	Gaziantep	7	2025-26								1	1		1	1		1	1			1					12,43
45	Karşıyaka	16	1995-96					1		1	1	1		2	1	2	1	2	2	1	1					12,50
46	Yozgatspor	2	2001-02							1											1					12,50
47	Karagümrük	11	2025-26							1	3	1	1						1		3		1			12,73
48	Keçiörengücü	8	1967-68							1	1			1		1	1	2				1				12,75
49	Çaykur Rizespor	24	2025-26					1			1	4	1	1		4	3	3	3	2	1					12,88
50	Karabükspor	10	2017-18							1		2		1	1		1	1	1		2					12,90
51	Yeni Malatyaspor	5	2021-22					1					1					1	1				1			13,20
52	Manisaspor	6	2012-13										1		2		1		1	1						13,50
53	Diyarbakırspor	11	2009-10					1				1			2		1	1	2	1	1	1				13,91
54	Hatayspor	5	2024-25						1						1			1			1	1				14,00
55	Zeytinburnuspor	5	1996-97										1			1	1		1		1					14,20
56	Kayseri Erciyesspor	13	2014-15										1	2	2		1	1	3	2		1				14,31
57	Çanakkale Dardanelspor	3	1998-99											1				1		1						14,33
58	Hacettepe	2	2008-09											1							1					14,50
59	Altınordu	10	1969-70								1				2	1	1		3			1	1			14,60
60	Erzurumspor	3	2000-01													1	1			1						14,67
61	Vanspor	5	1999-00												1	1	1				2					15,00
62	Elazığspor	4	2013-14													2			1		1					15,00
63	Akçaabat Sebatspor	2	2004-05													1					1					15,50
64	Beyoğluspor	2	1963-64														1			1						15,50
65	Şekerspor	10	1997-98												1		1	5		1			1		1	16,00
66	Siirtspor	1	2000-01																1							16,00
67	Bucaspor	1	2010-11																1							16,00
68	Kırıkkalespor	1	1978-79																1							16,00
69	Bodrum	1	2024-25																1							16,00
70	Adalet	2	1959-60															1			1					16,50
71	Balıkesirspor	2	2014-15																1		1					17,00
72	Petrolofisi	1	1994-95																	1						17,00
73	Ümraniyespor	1	2022-23																	1						17,00
74	Erzurumspor F.K.	2	2020-21																	1	1					17,50
75	Kahramanmaraşspor	1	1988-89																		1					18,00
76	Yeşildirek	2	1962-63																	1				1		19,00
77	Pendikspor	1	2023-24																			1				19,00
78	Amed																									
79	Çorum																									

Clubs play in Süper Lig 2026-27 season.

== Attendances ==
Attendance Records
Rank	Attendance	Stadium	Date	Game	Information
1	79,414	Atatürk Olympic Stadium	31 July 2002	Galatasaray – Olympiacos	Highest attendance in Turkey
2	76,127	Atatürk Olympic Stadium	22 September 2013	Beşiktaş – Galatasaray	Highest Süper Lig and Beşiktaş–Galatasaray rivalry attendance
3	72,059	Atatürk Olympic Stadium	25 May 2005	AC Milan – FC Liverpool	
4	71,412	Atatürk Olympic Stadium	10 June 2023	Manchester City – Inter Milan	
5	71,334	Atatürk Olympic Stadium	21 September 2003	Galatasaray – Fenerbahçe	Highest Intercontinental Derby attendance
6	71,230	Atatürk Olympic Stadium	12 September 2006	Galatasaray – FC Girondins de Bordeaux	
7	70,847	Atatürk Olympic Stadium	03 August 2024	Galatasaray SK – Beşiktaş JK	highest Süper Kupa attendance
8	68,034	İzmir Atatürk Stadium	31 October 1976	Turkey – Malta	Highest Turkish National Team attendance
9	67,696	İzmir Atatürk Stadium	16 May 1981	Karşıyaka – Göztepe	Highest 2nd division attendance
10	66,701	İzmir Atatürk Stadium	21 January 1973	Galatasaray – Fenerbahçe	

== See also ==
- Süper Lig
- List of Süper Lig top scorers
- List of Turkish football champions
