= List of Turkish football champions =

Turkish football championships
- Organising body: Turkish Football Federation
- Founded: 1924
- Country: Turkey
- Number of clubs: 18
- Level on pyramid: Level 1
- Current champions: Galatasaray (2025–26)
- Most championships: All-time championships: Fenerbahçe (28 titles); Recognized as league championships: Galatasaray (26 titles)
- Current: 2025–26

Football team of Harbiye in 1924, the first national champions in Turkish football history

The Turkish football champions are the annual winners of the highest association football competition in Turkey. Brought to the country by Englishmen, the sport had first taken root in Istanbul, where the Istanbul Football League was founded and became the first football league in Turkey. Other regional and local leagues followed in other major cities, such as Ankara (1922), Adana (1924), Eskişehir (1924), and İzmir (1924).

The first competition to bring forth a national champion was the Turkish Football Championship (Turkish: Türkiye Futbol Şampiyonası), which began in 1924 and continued until 1951. The championship format was based on a knockout competition, contested between the winners of each of the country's top regional leagues. At the end of the 1924 edition, Harbiye were the first club to be crowned champions after completing their fixture unbeaten. They are also the only club who have ever changed their name after winning a championship title, changing their name to Harp Okulu after the first of their three titles. Started in 1937, the National Division (Turkish: Millî Küme) was the first national league competition and was held until 1950.

A few years later, in 1959, the professional nationwide league was introduced, currently known as the Süper Lig. The league is contested on a double round-robin basis and the championship is awarded to the team that is top of the league at the end of the season. The league originally contained 16 teams. Today the Süper Lig is contested by 18 teams. Of the founding clubs in the league, only Beşiktaş, Fenerbahçe, and Galatasaray have not been relegated to date. Galatasaray are the most successful Süper Lig club with 26 titles. Fenerbahçe are the most successful club including championships before the start of Süper Lig (1959), having won 28 titles in total so far. However, the Turkish Football Federation denies and does not recognise the titles won in the former Turkish Football Championship and National Division, even though they were official championships organised by the TFF itself.

A process is currently underway for the TFF to recognise titles awarded before 1957, after several clubs officially applied to the association for recognition of titles awarded before 1959. In July 2023, the TFF decided to establish a championship commission to make a decision. However, the following year, the TFF was still unable to establish a commission. According to a Turkish historian, the actions of the TFF appear to be a delaying tactic to avoid making a decision.

== History ==
=== Early history and former championships ===
Turkish newspaper Cumhuriyet announcing the Turkish championship title of Fenerbahçe on its front page on 11 November 1933.

Football in Turkey stems back to the late 19th century, when Englishmen brought the game with them while living in Salonica (then part of the Turkish Empire). The first league competition was the Istanbul Football League, a regional league for Istanbul clubs which took place for the first time in the 1904–05 season. Shortly after the foundation of the Turkish Republic and the Turkish Football Federation (TFF), several other regional leagues were officially established (or gained official status as some were already founded earlier) in various major cities: Ankara (1922), Adana (1924), Bursa (1924), Eskişehir (1924), İzmir (1924), and Trabzon (1922).

The first competition to bring forth a national champion was the Turkish Football Championship (Turkish: Türkiye Futbol Şampiyonası), which began in 1924 and continued until 1951. The championship format was based on a knockout competition, contested between the winners of the country's top regional leagues. In some of the early years, the championship could not be held due to insufficient funds.

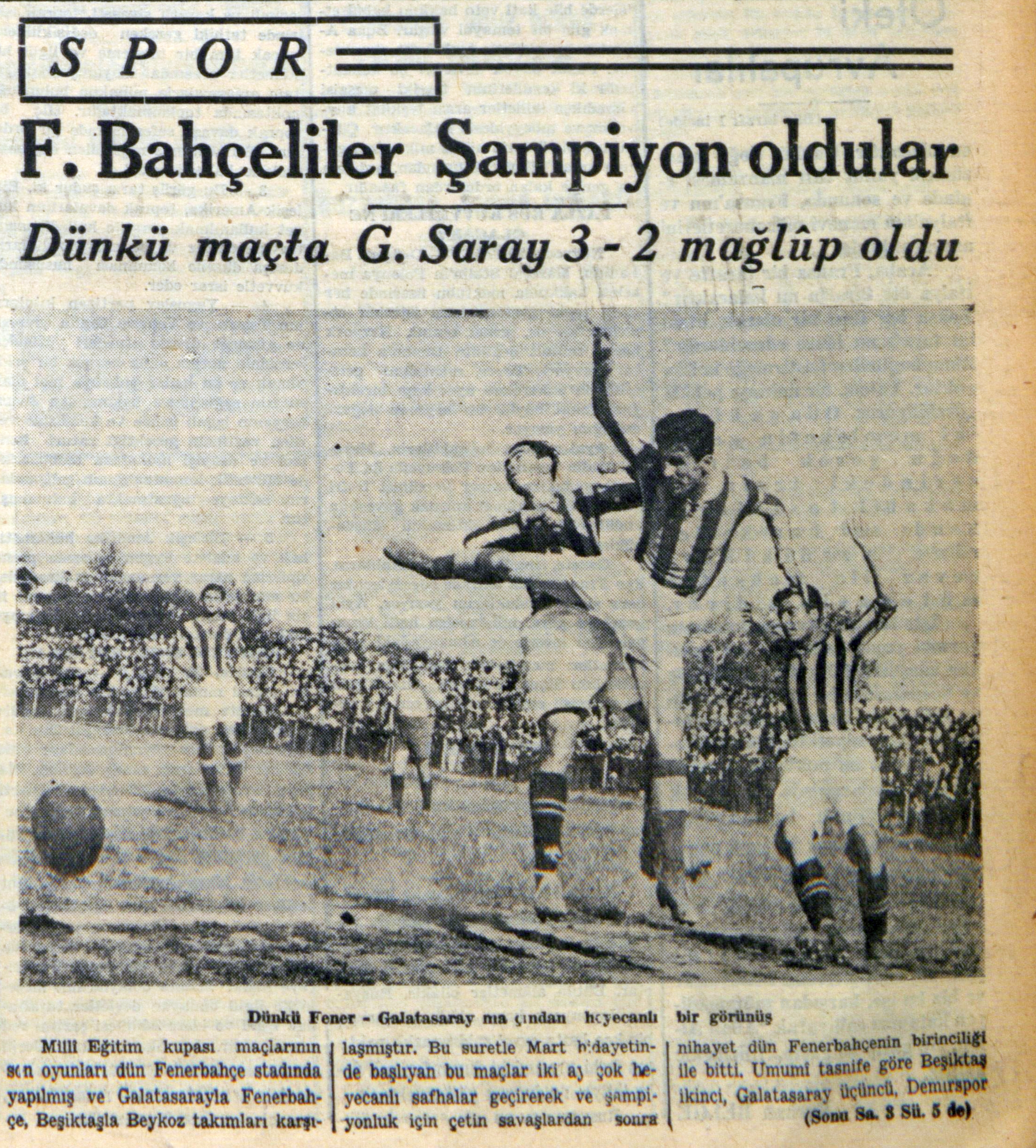
Turkish newspaper Tanin announcing the Championship title of Fenerbahçe on its sports page on 21 May 1945.

Started in 1937, the National Division (Turkish: Millî Küme) was a national league competition between the strongest clubs of Ankara, Istanbul, and İzmir, which hosted the strongest regional leagues in those decades. The league lasted until 1950. From 1940 to 1950, both top-level championships existed at the same time, which resulted in there being two national champions within a year. Since the National Division was based on a league format, with home and away matches on a regular basis and a higher number of matches overall, it was more popular and competitive than the Turkish Championship and overshadowed it.

=== Introduction of professionalism and Süper Lig ===
In 1952 the TFF introduced professionalism in Turkish football. Shortly after, the top-level Istanbul League and the clubs playing there adopted professionalism, while the Ankara and İzmir clubs followed some years later in 1955. After that point the Turkish Football Championship was no longer open to professional clubs, hence the professional departments of the Istanbul clubs could no longer participate in the championship. As a result, the former Turkish Football Championship lost its first level status. Since there was no top-level national champion in the period from 1952 to 1955, the Turkish federation sent Galatasaray, winners of the 1955–56 Istanbul League, to the European Cup in the 1956–57 season.

Protests of some Ankara and İzmir clubs regarding this decision, as well as UEFA deciding to only accept national champions to the European Cup from that season on induced the TFF to establish the Federation Cup in 1956. The competition took place as a knock-out tournament to decide a national champion. The Federation Cup was held for two years until it was replaced by the Süper Lig (then known as Millî Lig) in 1959. Beşiktaş won both editions and earned the right to represent Turkey twice in the European Cup during the two-year span. However, since the Turkish Football Federation failed to register them for the draw in time, they were not able to participate in the 1957–58 season after all.

After some years of preparation and planning, the professional nationwide league called Millî Lig (National League) was finally introduced in 1959. Eligible for the newly established nationwide league were the top clubs of the regional Ankara, Istanbul, and İzmir leagues. The inaugural season took place in the calendar year of 1959, instead of 1958–59, since the regional leagues leading to qualification took place in 1958. The clubs competing in the first season were Adalet, Beşiktaş, Galatasaray, Beykoz, Karagümrük, Fenerbahçe, İstanbulspor, Vefa (all from Istanbul), Ankaragücü, Ankara Demirspor, Gençlerbirliği, Hacettepe (all from Ankara), Altay, Göztepe, İzmirspor, and Karşıyaka (all from İzmir). The first champions were Fenerbahçe and the first "Gol Kralı" (top scorer) was Metin Oktay.

The 2. Lig (Second League) was created at the start of the 1963–64 season and the National League (Millî Lig) became known as the 1. Lig (First League). After the creation of a new second division in 2001, from then on known as 1. Lig, the formerly titled 1. Lig became the current Süper Lig.

== Champions ==
According to historians' analysis of the 2002 Turkish Football Federation Arbitration Court decision, which stated that the Turkish League Championships began before 1959 and the championships before 1959 cannot be left uncounted.

The numbers in parentheses indicate the number of titles won in total since 1924.

=== Turkish Football Championship (1924–1951) ===
(not recognised by TFF)

| Season | Winners | Runners-up | Leading goalscorer(s) | Goals |
|---|---|---|---|---|
| 1924 | Harbiye (1) | Bahriye | not available | |
| 1925–26 | Not held due to insufficient funds. | | | |
| 1927 | Muhafızgücü (1) | Altınordu | not available | |
| 1928–31 | Not held due to the 1928 Summer Olympics in Amsterdam and insufficient funds. | | | |
| 1932 | İstanbulspor (1) | Altınordu | not available | |
| 1933 | Fenerbahçe (1) | İzmirspor | (Turkey) Zeki Rıza (Fenerbahçe) | 10 |
| 1934 | Beşiktaş (1) | Altay | not available | |
| 1935 | Fenerbahçe (2) | Altınordu | not available | |
| 1936–39 | Not held due to the introduction of the National Division. | | | |
| 1940 | Eskişehir Demirspor (1) | Fenerbahçe | not available | |
| 1941 | Gençlerbirliği (1) | Beşiktaş | not available | |
| 1942 | Harp Okulu (2) | Göztepe | not available | |
| 1943 | Not held | | | |
| 1944 | Fenerbahçe (3) | Harp Okulu | not available | |
| 1945 | Harp Okulu (3) | İzmit Harp Filosu | not available | |
| 1946 | Gençlerbirliği (2) | Beşiktaş | not available | |
| 1947 | Ankara Demirspor (1) | Fenerbahçe | not available | |
| 1948 | Not held due to the 1948 Summer Olympics in London. | | | |
| 1949 | Ankaragücü (1) | Galatasaray | not available | |
| 1950 | Göztepe (1) | Gençlerbirliği | not available | |
| 1951 | Beşiktaş (5) | Altay | not available | |

=== National Division (1937–1950) ===
(not recognised by TFF)

| Season | Winners | Runners-up | Third place | Leading goalscorer(s) | Goals |
|---|---|---|---|---|---|
| 1937 | Fenerbahçe (4) | Galatasaray | Beşiktaş | (Turkey) Said Altınordu (Üçok) | 13 |
| 1938 | Güneş (1) | Beşiktaş | Galatasaray | (Turkey) Şeref Görkey (Beşiktaş) | 13 |
| 1939 | Galatasaray (1) | Ankara Demirspor | AS-FA Gücü | (Turkey) Cemil Erlertürk (Galatasaray) (Turkey) Hakkı Yeten (Beşiktaş) | 13 |
| 1940 | Fenerbahçe (5) | Galatasaray | Muhafızgücü | (Turkey) Melih Kotanca (Fenerbahçe) | 23 |
| 1941 | Beşiktaş (2) | Galatasaray | Fenerbahçe | (Turkey) Hakkı Yeten (Beşiktaş) | 18 |
| 1942 | Not held as a result of the weather conditions and the delayed conclusion of the Istanbul League. | | | | |
| 1943 | Fenerbahçe (6) | Galatasaray | Beşiktaş | (Turkey) Şeref Görkey (Beşiktaş) | 13 |
| 1944 | Beşiktaş (3) | Fenerbahçe | Göztepe | (Turkey) Kemal Gülçelik (Beşiktaş) (Turkey) Hakkı Yeten (Beşiktaş) | 15 |
| 1945 | Fenerbahçe (7) | Beşiktaş | Galatasaray | (Turkey) Melih Kotanca (Fenerbahçe) | 17 |
| 1946 | Fenerbahçe (8) | Beşiktaş | Kayagücü | (Turkey) Melih Kotanca (Fenerbahçe) | 12 |
| 1947 | Beşiktaş (4) | Fenerbahçe | Galatasaray | (Turkey) İsmet Artun (Vefa) (Turkey) Şükrü Gülesin (Beşiktaş) | 12 |
| 1948 | Not held due to the 1948 Summer Olympics in London. | | | | |
| 1949 | Not held due to the Mediterranean Cup. | | | | |
| 1950 | Fenerbahçe (9) | Galatasaray | Beşiktaş | (Turkey) Lefter Küçükandonyadis (Fenerbahçe) | 14 |

=== Federation Cup (1956–1958) ===
(the cup competition recognised by TFF as league championship since 2002)

| Season | Winners | Runners-up | Third place | Leading goalscorer(s) | Goals |
|---|---|---|---|---|---|
| 1956–57 | Beşiktaş (6) | Galatasaray | Altay | (Turkey) Nazmi Bilge (Beşiktaş) | 8 |
| 1957–58 | Beşiktaş (7) | Galatasaray | — | (Turkey) Lefter Küçükandonyadis (Fenerbahçe) (Turkey) Metin Oktay (Galatasaray) | 10 |

=== Süper Lig (1959–present) ===
| Season | Winners | Runners-up | Third place | Leading goalscorer(s) | Goals |
|---|---|---|---|---|---|
| 1959 | Fenerbahçe (10) | Galatasaray | — | (Turkey) Metin Oktay (Galatasaray) | 11 |
| 1959–60 | Beşiktaş (8) | Fenerbahçe | Galatasaray | (Turkey) Metin Oktay (Galatasaray) | 33 |
| 1960–61 | Fenerbahçe (11) | Galatasaray | Beşiktaş | (Turkey) Metin Oktay (Galatasaray) | 36 |
| 1961–62 | Galatasaray (2) | Fenerbahçe | Beşiktaş | (Turkey) Fikri Elma (Ankara Demirspor) | 21 |
| 1962–63 | Galatasaray (3) | Beşiktaş | Fenerbahçe | (Turkey) Metin Oktay (Galatasaray) | 38 |
| 1963–64 | Fenerbahçe (12) | Beşiktaş | Galatasaray | (Turkey) Güven Önüt (Beşiktaş) | 19 |
| 1964–65 | Fenerbahçe (13) | Beşiktaş | Galatasaray | (Turkey) Metin Oktay (Galatasaray) | 17 |
| 1965–66 | Beşiktaş (9) | Galatasaray | Gençlerbirliği | (Turkey) Ertan Adatepe (Ankaragücü) | 20 |
| 1966–67 | Beşiktaş (10) | Fenerbahçe | Galatasaray | (Turkey) Ertan Adatepe (Ankaragücü) | 18 |
| 1967–68 | Fenerbahçe (14) | Beşiktaş | Galatasaray | (Turkey) Fevzi Zemzem (Göztepe) | 19 |
| 1968–69 | Galatasaray (4) | Eskişehirspor | Beşiktaş | (Turkey) Metin Oktay (Galatasaray) | 17 |
| 1969–70 | Fenerbahçe (15) | Eskişehirspor | Altay | (Turkey) Fethi Heper (Eskişehirspor) | 13 |
| 1970–71 | Galatasaray (5) | Fenerbahçe | Göztepe | (Turkey) Ogün Altıparmak (Fenerbahçe) | 16 |
| 1971–72 | Galatasaray (6) | Eskişehirspor | Fenerbahçe | (Turkey) Fethi Heper (Eskişehirspor) | 20 |
| 1972–73 | Galatasaray (7) | Fenerbahçe | Eskişehirspor | (Turkey) Osman Arpacıoğlu (Fenerbahçe) | 16 |
| 1973–74 | Fenerbahçe (16) | Beşiktaş | Boluspor | (Turkey) Cemil Turan (Fenerbahçe) | 14 |
| 1974–75 | Fenerbahçe (17) | Galatasaray | Eskişehirspor | (Turkey) Ömer Kaner (Eskişehirspor) | 14 |
| 1975–76 | Trabzonspor (1) | Fenerbahçe | Galatasaray | (Turkey) Cemil Turan (Fenerbahçe) (Turkey) Ali Osman Renklibay (Ankaragücü) | 17 |
| 1976–77 | Trabzonspor (2) | Fenerbahçe | Altay | (Turkey) Necmi Perekli (Trabzonspor) | 18 |
| 1977–78 | Fenerbahçe (18) | Trabzonspor | Galatasaray | (Turkey) Cemil Turan (Fenerbahçe) | 17 |
| 1978–79 | Trabzonspor (3) | Galatasaray | Fenerbahçe | (Turkey) Özer Umdu (Adanaspor) | 15 |
| 1979–80 | Trabzonspor (4) | Fenerbahçe | Zonguldakspor | (Turkey) Mustafa Denizli (Altay) (Turkey) Bahtiyar Yorulmaz (Bursaspor) | 12 |
| 1980–81 | Trabzonspor (5) | Adanaspor | Galatasaray | (Turkey) Bora Öztürk (Adanaspor) | 15 |
| 1981–82 | Beşiktaş (11) | Trabzonspor | Fenerbahçe | (Turkey) Selçuk Yula (Fenerbahçe) | 16 |
| 1982–83 | Fenerbahçe (19) | Trabzonspor | Galatasaray | (Turkey) Selçuk Yula (Fenerbahçe) | 19 |
| 1983–84 | Trabzonspor (6) | Fenerbahçe | Galatasaray | (Socialist Federal Republic of Yugoslavia) Tarik Hodžić (Galatasaray) | 16 |
| 1984–85 | Fenerbahçe (20) | Beşiktaş | Trabzonspor | (Turkey) Aykut Yiğit (Sakaryaspor) | 20 |
| 1985–86 | Beşiktaş (12) | Galatasaray | Samsunspor | (Turkey) Tanju Çolak (Samsunspor) | 33 |
| 1986–87 | Galatasaray (8) | Beşiktaş | Samsunspor | (Turkey) Tanju Çolak (Samsunspor) | 25 |
| 1987–88 | Galatasaray (9) | Beşiktaş | Malatyaspor | (Turkey) Tanju Çolak (Galatasaray) | 39 |
| 1988–89 | Fenerbahçe (21) | Beşiktaş | Galatasaray | (Turkey) Aykut Kocaman (Fenerbahçe) | 29 |
| 1989–90 | Beşiktaş (13) | Fenerbahçe | Trabzonspor | (Turkey) Feyyaz Uçar (Beşiktaş) | 28 |
| 1990–91 | Beşiktaş (14) | Galatasaray | Trabzonspor | (Turkey) Tanju Çolak (Galatasaray) | 31 |
| 1991–92 | Beşiktaş (15) | Fenerbahçe | Galatasaray | (Turkey) Aykut Kocaman (Fenerbahçe) | 25 |
| 1992–93 | Galatasaray (10) | Beşiktaş | Trabzonspor | (Turkey) Tanju Çolak (Fenerbahçe) | 27 |
| 1993–94 | Galatasaray (11) | Fenerbahçe | Trabzonspor | (Turkey) Bülent Uygun (Fenerbahçe) | 22 |
| 1994–95 | Beşiktaş (16) | Trabzonspor | Galatasaray | (Turkey) Aykut Kocaman (Fenerbahçe) | 27 |
| 1995–96 | Fenerbahçe (22) | Trabzonspor | Beşiktaş | (Georgia (country)) Shota Arveladze (Trabzonspor) | 25 |
| 1996–97 | Galatasaray (12) | Beşiktaş | Fenerbahçe | (Turkey) Hakan Şükür (Galatasaray) | 38 |
| 1997–98 | Galatasaray (13) | Fenerbahçe | Trabzonspor | (Turkey) Hakan Şükür (Galatasaray) | 33 |
| 1998–99 | Galatasaray (14) | Beşiktaş | Fenerbahçe | (Turkey) Hakan Şükür (Galatasaray) | 19 |
| 1999–2000 | Galatasaray (15) | Beşiktaş | Gaziantepspor | (Turkey) Serkan Aykut (Samsunspor) | 30 |
| 2000–01 | Fenerbahçe (23) | Galatasaray | Gaziantepspor | (Turkey) Okan Yılmaz (Bursaspor) | 23 |
| 2001–02 | Galatasaray (16) | Fenerbahçe | Beşiktaş | (Turkey) Arif Erdem (Galatasaray) (Turkey) İlhan Mansız (Beşiktaş) | 21 |
| 2002–03 | Beşiktaş (17) | Galatasaray | Gençlerbirliği | (Turkey) Okan Yılmaz (Bursaspor) | 24 |
| 2003–04 | Fenerbahçe (24) | Trabzonspor | Beşiktaş | (Turkey) Zafer Biryol (Konyaspor) | 25 |
| 2004–05 | Fenerbahçe (25) | Trabzonspor | Galatasaray | (Turkey) Fatih Tekke (Trabzonspor) | 31 |
| 2005–06 | Galatasaray (17) | Fenerbahçe | Beşiktaş | (Turkey) Gökhan Ünal (Kayserispor) | 25 |
| 2006–07 | Fenerbahçe (26) | Beşiktaş | Galatasaray | (Brazil) Alex (Fenerbahçe) | 19 |
| 2007–08 | Galatasaray (18) | Fenerbahçe | Beşiktaş | (Turkey) Semih Şentürk (Fenerbahçe) | 17 |
| 2008–09 | Beşiktaş (18) | Sivasspor | Trabzonspor | (Czech Republic) Milan Baroš (Galatasaray) | 20 |
| 2009–10 | Bursaspor (1) | Fenerbahçe | Galatasaray | (Portugal) Ariza Makukula (Kayserispor) | 21 |
| 2010–11 | Fenerbahçe (27) | Trabzonspor | Bursaspor | (Brazil) Alex (Fenerbahçe) | 28 |
| 2011–12 | Galatasaray (19) | Fenerbahçe | Trabzonspor | (Turkey) Burak Yılmaz (Trabzonspor) | 33 |
| 2012–13 | Galatasaray (20) | Fenerbahçe | Beşiktaş | (Turkey) Burak Yılmaz (Galatasaray) | 24 |
| 2013–14 | Fenerbahçe (28) | Galatasaray | Beşiktaş | (Morocco) Aatif Chahechouhe (Sivasspor) | 17 |
| 2014–15 | Galatasaray (21) | Fenerbahçe | Beşiktaş | (Brazil) Fernandão (Bursaspor) | 22 |
| 2015–16 | Beşiktaş (19) | Fenerbahçe | Konyaspor | (Germany) Mario Gómez (Beşiktaş) | 26 |
| 2016–17 | Beşiktaş (20) | İstanbul Başakşehir | Fenerbahçe | (Brazil) Vágner Love (Alanyaspor) | 23 |
| 2017–18 | Galatasaray (22) | Fenerbahçe | İstanbul Başakşehir | (France) Bafétimbi Gomis (Galatasaray) | 29 |
| 2018–19 | Galatasaray (23) | İstanbul Başakşehir | Beşiktaş | (Senegal) Mbaye Diagne (Galatasaray) | 30 |
| 2019–20 | İstanbul Başakşehir (1) | Trabzonspor | Beşiktaş | (Norway) Alexander Sørloth (Trabzonspor) | 24 |
| 2020–21 | Beşiktaş (21) | Galatasaray | Fenerbahçe | (Gabon) Aaron Boupendza (Hatayspor) | 22 |
| 2021–22 | Trabzonspor (7) | Fenerbahçe | Konyaspor | (Turkey) Umut Bozok (Kasımpaşa) | 20 |
| 2022–23 | Galatasaray (24) | Fenerbahçe | Beşiktaş | (Ecuador) Enner Valencia (Fenerbahçe) | 29 |
| 2023–24 | Galatasaray (25) | Fenerbahçe | Trabzonspor | (Argentina) Mauro Icardi (Galatasaray) | 25 |
| 2024–25 | Galatasaray (26) | Fenerbahçe | Samsunspor | (Nigeria) Victor Osimhen (Galatasaray) | 26 |
| 2025–26 | Galatasaray (27) | Fenerbahçe | Trabzonspor | (Nigeria) Paul Onuachu (Trabzonspor) (Uzbekistan) Eldor Shomurodov (İstanbul Başakşehir) | 22 |

== Performances ==
Over the history of the Turkish football championships 15 different clubs have won the title. The most successful club are Fenerbahçe with 28 titles to their credit, most of those coming in Süper Lig competition. They are also the most successful pre-Süper Lig club with 9 titles overall in that era, 6 of them won in the National Division and 3 in the former Turkish Football Championship.

=== All-time performance (1924–present) ===
1. Fenerbahçe – 28 29.17 (27.2%)
2. Galatasaray – 27 28.13 (26.2%)
3. Beşiktaş – 21 21.88 (20.4%)
4. Trabzonspor – 7 13.54 (12.6%)
5. Harp Okulu SK - 3 3.13 (2.92%)
6. Gençlerbirliği - 2 2.08 (1.94%)
7. Others - 9 9.38 (8.74%)

In the table below all national championship titles since 1924 are included, including the former Turkish Football Championship and National Division, which are denied and not recognized by the Turkish Football Federation, even though they were official championships organized by the TFF itself.

| Club | Winners | Runners-up | Winning years | Runners-up years |
|---|---|---|---|---|
| **Fenerbahçe** | 28 | 31 | 1933, 1935, 1937, 1940, 1943, 1944, 1945, 1946, 1950, 1959, 1960–61, 1963–64, 1964–65, 1967–68, 1969–70, 1973–74, 1974–75, 1977–78, 1982–83, 1984–85, 1988–89, 1995–96, 2000–01, 2003–04, 2004–05, 2006–07, 2010–11, 2013–14 | 1940, 1944, 1947, 1947, 1959–60, 1961–62, 1966–67, 1970–71, 1972–73, 1975–76, 1976–77, 1979–80, 1983–84, 1989–90, 1991–92, 1993–94, 1997–98, 2001–02, 2005–06, 2007–08, 2009–10, 2011–12, 2012–13, 2014–15, 2015–16, 2017–18, 2021–22, 2022–23, 2023–24, 2024–25, 2025–26 |
| **Galatasaray** | 27 | 19 | 1939, 1961–62, 1962–63, 1968–69, 1970–71, 1971–72, 1972–73, 1986–87, 1987–88, 1992–93, 1993–94, 1996–97, 1997–98, 1998–99, 1999–2000, 2001–02, 2005–06, 2007–08, 2011–12, 2012–13, 2014–15, 2017–18, 2018–19, 2022–23, 2023–24, 2024–25, 2025–26 | 1937, 1940, 1941, 1943, 1949, 1950, 1956–57, 1957–58, 1959, 1960–61, 1965–66, 1974–75, 1978–79, 1985–86, 1990–91, 2000–01, 2002–03, 2013–14, 2020–21 |
| **Beşiktaş** | 21 | 19 | 1934, 1941, 1944, 1947, 1951, 1956–57, 1957–58, 1959–60, 1965–66, 1966–67, 1981–82, 1985–86, 1989–90, 1990–91, 1991–92, 1994–95, 2002–03, 2008–09, 2015–16, 2016–17, 2020–21 | 1938, 1941, 1945, 1946, 1946, 1962–63, 1963–64, 1964–65, 1967–68, 1973–74, 1984–85, 1986–87, 1987–88, 1988–89, 1992–93, 1996–97, 1998–99, 1999–2000, 2006–07 |
| **Trabzonspor** | 7 | 9 | 1975–76, 1976–77, 1978–79, 1979–80, 1980–81, 1983–84, 2021–22 | 1977–78, 1981–82, 1982–83, 1994–95, 1995–96, 2003–04, 2004–05, 2010–11, 2019–20 |
| Harp Okulu | 3 | 1 | 1924, 1942, 1945 | 1944 |
| Gençlerbirliği | 2 | 1 | 1941, 1946 | 1950 |
| **İstanbul Başakşehir** | 1 | 2 | 2019–20 | 2016–17, 2018–19 |
| **Göztepe** | 1 | 1 | 1950 | 1942 |
| Ankara Demirspor | 1 | 1 | 1947 | 1939 |
| Bursaspor | 1 | — | 2009–10 | — |
| MKE Ankaragücü | 1 | — | 1949 | — |
| Eskişehir Demirspor | 1 | — | 1940 | — |
| Güneş | 1 | — | 1938 | — |
| İstanbulspor | 1 | — | 1932 | — |
| Muhafızgücü | 1 | — | 1927 | — |
| Eskişehirspor | — | 3 | — | 1969, 1970, 1972 |
| **Sivasspor** | — | 1 | — | 2009 |
| Adanaspor | — | 1 | — | 1981 |
| Altay | — | 1 | — | 1951 |
| Altınordu | — | 1 | — | 1935 |

- **Bold** – club plays in the current Süper Lig.
- Italic – club dissolved or merged.

=== Performance since 1959 ===
Only six clubs have been champions since the beginning of the Süper Lig in 1959: Galatasaray 26 times, Fenerbahçe 19 times, Beşiktaş 16 times (with an additional two titles counted for star purposes, see note below), Trabzonspor 7 times, and Bursaspor and Başakşehir once.

| Club | Winners | Runners-up | Winning years | Runners-up years |
|---|---|---|---|---|
| **Galatasaray** | 26 | 13 | 1962, 1963, 1969, 1971, 1972, 1973, 1987, 1988, 1993, 1994, 1997, 1998, 1999, 2000, 2002, 2006, 2008, 2012, 2013, 2015, 2018, 2019, 2023, 2024, 2025, 2026 | 1957^{1}, 1958^{1}, 1959, 1961, 1966, 1975, 1979, 1986, 1991, 2001, 2003, 2014, 2021 |
| **Fenerbahçe** | 19 | 27 | 1959, 1961, 1964, 1965, 1968, 1970, 1974, 1975, 1978, 1983, 1985, 1989, 1996, 2001, 2004, 2005, 2007, 2011, 2014 | 1960, 1962, 1967, 1971, 1973, 1976, 1977, 1980, 1984, 1990, 1992, 1994, 1998, 2002, 2006, 2008, 2010, 2012, 2013, 2015, 2016, 2018, 2022, 2023, 2024, 2025, 2026 |
| **Beşiktaş** | 16 | 14 | 1957 (Note: Beşiktaş formally requested that championships won in the 1956–57 and 1957–58 editions of the Turkish Federation Cup be counted as Turkish championship titles to the Turkish Football Federation. The Cup was established in 1956 to find a national champion to represent Turkey, after UEFA decided that only national champions could participate in the European Cup. Beşiktaş had therefore earned the right to represent Turkey in the 1957–58 and 1958–59 seasons of the European Cup. However, since the Turkish Football Federation failed to register them for the draw in time, they were not able to participate in the 1957–58 season after all. The ruling on this matter was announced in a press release on March 25, 2002, which indicated that the championships won by Beşiktaş in the Federation Cup will be considered as national championship titles.), 1958, 1960, 1966, 1967, 1982, 1986, 1990, 1991, 1992, 1995, 2003, 2009, 2016, 2017, 2021 | 1963, 1964, 1965, 1968, 1974, 1985, 1987, 1988, 1989, 1993, 1997, 1999, 2000, 2007 |
| **Trabzonspor** | 7 | 9 | 1976, 1977, 1979, 1980, 1981, 1984, 2022 | 1978, 1982, 1983, 1995, 1996, 2004, 2005, 2011, 2020 |
| **Başakşehir** | 1 | 2 | 2020 | 2017, 2019 |
| Bursaspor | 1 | — | 2010 | — |
| Eskişehirspor | — | 3 | — | 1969, 1970, 1972 |
| **Sivasspor** | — | 1 | — | 2009 |
| Adanaspor | — | 1 | — | 1981 |

- **Bold** – club plays in the current Süper Lig.

== Star rating system ==
The honor of Golden Stars was introduced to recognize sides that have won multiple championships or other honours by the display of gold stars on their team badges and jerseys. In Turkey clubs are permitted to place a golden star above their crest for every five national championships won. For the 2025–26 season Galatasaray are permitted five golden stars, Fenerbahçe and Beşiktaş are permitted three golden stars, and Trabzonspor are permitted one golden star to be placed above their crest on their jerseys.

== See also ==
- Football records and statistics in Turkey
- List of Süper Lig top scorers
