= 1941 Turkish Football Championship =

Tournament details
- Country: Turkey
- Dates: 12 July – 15 July

Final positions
- Champions: Gençlerbirliği (1st Turkish title)
- Runner-up: Beşiktaş

The 1941 Turkish Football Championship was the eighth edition of the competition. It was held in July. Gençlerbirliği won their first national championship title by defeating Beşiktaş in the final. For Gençlerbirliği it was the club's first title with one more to follow in 1946.

The championship was held in a new format again. The champions of the three major regional leagues (Istanbul, Ankara, and İzmir) and 1940 Turkish football champions Eskişehir Demirspor qualified directly for the competition. Kayseri Sümerspor, Gölcük İdman Yurdu, and Trabzon İdman Gücü qualified by winning their respective regional qualification groups. All matches of the championship were played at 19 Mayıs Stadium in Ankara.

== Qualified clubs ==
- 1940–41 Istanbul League champions Beşiktaş
- 1940–41 Ankara League champions Gençlerbirliği
- 1940–41 İzmir League champions Altay
- 1940 Turkish Football Championship winners Eskişehir Demirspor
- Adana Group winners Kayseri Sümerspor
- Samsun Group winners Trabzon İdman Gücü
- Balıkesir Group winners Gölcük İdman Yurdu

== Round 1 ==
12 July 1941	Eskişehir Demirspor	4 – 1	Kayseri Sümerspor	Ankara
		Report		Stadium: 19 Mayıs Stadium

12 July 1941	Gençlerbirliği	5 – 0	Gölcük İdman Yurdu	Ankara
		Report		Stadium: 19 Mayıs Stadium

13 July 1941	Altay	3 – 1	Trabzon İdman Gücü	Ankara
16:00		Report		Stadium: 19 Mayıs Stadium

- Beşiktaş received a bye for the semi-finals.

== Semi-finals ==
13 July 1941	Beşiktaş	4 – 0	Eskişehir Demirspor	Ankara
18:00		Report		Stadium: 19 Mayıs Stadium

14 July 1941	Gençlerbirliği	4 – 1	Altay	Ankara
		Report		Stadium: 19 Mayıs Stadium

== Final ==
15 July 1941
18:00

Gençlerbirliği	4 – 1	Beşiktaş
Mustafa K. 5'; Ali K. 16'; Mustafa B. 25'; Hasan Polat 70'	Report	Yavuz 85' (pen.)

19 Mayıs Stadium, Ankara
Attendance: 10,000
Referee: Yusuf Aysal
