= Konya İdman Yurdu =

Turkish sports club

- Full name: Konya İdman Yurdu Spor Kulübü
- Short name: Konya İY
- Founded: 3 July 1923; 102 years ago
- Dissolved: 1981 (merged with Konyaspor)
Home colours	Away colours

Konya İdman Yurdu was a Turkish sports club based in Konya, Turkey. The club was founded on 3 July 1923 and dissolved in 1981 after the merger with Konyaspor. The colours of Konya İdman Yurdu were green and white.

== History ==
Konya İdman Yurdu was founded on 3 July 1923. They achieved success in the regional Konya Football League very soon and won the championship title on numerous occasions, participating in the former Turkish Football Championship in several editions as Konya champions. Between 1971 and 1981 the club competed in the Turkish Second League. In 1981 Konya İdman Yurdu merged with rivals Konyaspor and ceased to exist. After both clubs merged the colours of Konyaspor became green and white, replacing their former colours black and white.

== League participations ==
- Turkish Football Championship: 1927, 1932, 1933, 1934, 1935
- TFF First League (second level): 1971–1981
- TFF Second League: 1967–1971
