= 1927 Turkish Football Championship =

Tournament details
- Country: Turkey
- Dates: 2 September – 10 September
- Teams: 17

Final positions
- Champions: Muhafızgücü (1st Turkish title)
- Runner-up: Altınordu

Tournament statistics
- Matches played: 18
- Goals scored: 113 (6.28 per match)

The 1927 Turkish Football Championship was the second edition of the competition. It was held in September. All matches were played at İstiklal Sahası in the capital Ankara. Muhafızgücü won their first and only championship title by defeating Altınordu 5–1 in the final. For Altınordu it was the first appearance in the final of the championship, with two more to follow in 1932 and 1935. Şekip Bey of Muhafızgücü, who scored three goals in the second half of the final, became the first player in Turkish football history to score a hat-trick in a national competition.

The champions of the various regional championships qualified for the competition played in knock-out format.

== Qualified clubs ==
Region	Champions
Istanbul	Galatasaray
Ankara	Muhafızgücü
İzmir	Altınordu
Eskişehir	Eskişehir Tayyare Yurdu
Konya	Konya İdman Yurdu
Çukurova	Mersin İdman Yurdu
Bursa	Işıklar Mektebi
Kocaeli	İzmit İttihadspor
Amasya	Albayrak İdman Yurdu
Antalya	İlk Işık
Kütahya	Kütahya Gençlerbirliği
Bilecik	Bozüyük İdman Yurdu
Edirne	Meriç İdman Yurdu
Uşak	Ergenekon İdman Yurdu
Giresun	Hilâl Spor

- The participants of the Karesi (Balıkesir) and Trabzon regions are currently not available.

== Preliminary round ==
2 September 1924

Eskişehir Tayyare Yurdu	14 – 1	Giresun Hilâl Spor

İstiklal Sahası, Ankara

== First round ==
2 September 1927

Bursa Işıklar Mektebi	2 – 0	Amasya Albayrak İdman Yurdu

İstiklal Sahası, Ankara
2 September 1927

İzmit İttihadspor	2 – 2^{1}	Altınordu

İstiklal Sahası, Ankara
3 September 1927

Balıkesir	2 – 1	Trabzon

İstiklal Sahası, Ankara
3 September 1927

Kütahya Gençlerbirliği	5 – 1	Uşak Ergenekon İdman Yurdu

İstiklal Sahası, Ankara
4 September 1927

Muhafızgücü	8 – 0	Edirne Meriç İdman Yurdu

İstiklal Sahası, Ankara
4 September 1927

Antalya İlk Işık	3 – 2	Bozüyük İdman Yurdu

İstiklal Sahası, Ankara
4 September 1927

Galatasaray	5 – 0	Mersin İdman Yurdu

İstiklal Sahası, Ankara
5 September 1927

Eskişehir Tayyare Yurdu	7 – 0	Konya İdman Yurdu

İstiklal Sahası, Ankara
- ^{1} The match could not be finished due to darkness. The remaining time was played on 5 September.

=== Resumed match ===
5 September 1927

İzmit İttihadspor	2 – 4	Altınordu

İstiklal Sahası, Ankara

== Quarter-finals ==
6 September 1927

Galatasaray	1 – 1	Muhafızgücü

İstiklal Sahası, Ankara
6 September 1927

Altınordu	14 – 1	Antalya İlk Işık

İstiklal Sahası, Ankara
6 September 1927

Balıkesir	12 – 0	Kütahya Gençlerbirliği

İstiklal Sahası, Ankara
6 September 1927

Eskişehir Tayyare Yurdu	1 – 0	Bursa Işıklar Mektebi

İstiklal Sahası, Ankara

=== Playoff ===
7 September 1927

Galatasaray	2 – 3	Muhafızgücü

İstiklal Sahası, Ankara
- A playoff was held since a winner could not be decided in the first game.

== Semi-finals ==
8 September 1927

Altınordu	1 – 0	Balıkesir

İstiklal Sahası, Ankara
9 September 1927

Eskişehir Tayyare Yurdu	0 – 7	Muhafızgücü

İstiklal Sahası, Ankara

== Third place match ==
10 September 1927

Balıkesir	4 – 3	Eskişehir Tayyare Yurdu

İstiklal Sahası, Ankara

== Final ==
10 September 1927

Altınordu	1 – 5	Muhafızgücü
Şevki Bey		Sedat Bey; Şekip Bey

İstiklal Sahası, Ankara
