= 1945 Turkish Football Championship =

Tournament details
- Country: Turkey
- Dates: 26 May – 29 May

Final positions
- Champions: Harp Okulu (3rd Turkish title)
- Runner-up: İzmit Harp Filosu

The 1945 Turkish Football Championship was the 11th edition of the competition. It was held in May. Harp Okulu won their third national championship title by winning the Final Group in Ankara.

The champions of the three major regional leagues (Istanbul, Ankara, and İzmir) qualified directly for the Final Group. İzmit Harp Filosu qualified by winning the qualification play-off, which was contested by the winners of the regional qualification groups.

== Qualification play-off ==
=== Round 1 ===
12 May 1945

İzmit Harp Filosu	6 – 0	Edirne
	Report

12 May 1945

Eskişehir Demirspor	4 – 0	Bursa Akınspor
	Report

=== Final ===
13 May 1945

İzmit Harp Filosu	1 – 0	Eskişehir Demirspor
	Report

== Final group ==
Pos	Team	Pld	W	D	L	GF	GA	GD	Pts
1	Harp Okulu	3	2	0	1	14	8	+6	7
2	İzmit Harp Filosu	3	2	0	1	6	12	−6	7
3	Beşiktaş	3	1	1	1	8	5	+3	6
4	Altınordu	3	0	1	2	4	7	−3	4

Source: rsssf.com
26 May 1945

Harp Okulu	9 – 1	İzmit Harp Filosu
	Report

19 Mayıs Stadium, Ankara
26 May 1945

Beşiktaş	1 – 1	Altınordu
	Report

19 Mayıs Stadium, Ankara
27 May 1945

Beşiktaş	5 – 1	Harp Okulu
	Report

19 Mayıs Stadium, Ankara
Referee: Mustafa Bayra
27 May 1945

İzmit Harp Filosu	2 – 1	Altınordu
	Report

19 Mayıs Stadium, Ankara
29 May 1945

İzmit Harp Filosu	3 – 2	Beşiktaş
	Report

19 Mayıs Stadium, Ankara
29 May 1945

Harp Okulu	4 – 2	Altınordu
	Report

19 Mayıs Stadium, Ankara
