= 1924 Turkish Football Championship =

Tournament details
- Country: Turkey
- Dates: 4 September – 12 September
- Teams: 15

Final positions
- Champions: Harbiye (1st Turkish title)
- Runner-up: Bahriye

Tournament statistics
- Matches played: 15
- Goals scored: 44 (2.93 per match)

The 1924 Turkish Football Championship was the first edition of the competition and the first national championship ever in Turkish football. It was held in September. All matches were played at İstiklal Sahası in the capital Ankara.

Harbiye won their first championship title unbeaten and without conceding a single goal by defeating Bahriye 3–0 in the final and became the first national champions in Turkish football history, with two more titles to follow in 1942 and 1945 under the name Harp Okulu. For Bahriye it was the sole appearance in the championship final and their sole participation in the competition altogether.

Harbiye and Bahriye (both from Istanbul) formed an exception in the inaugural edition of the tournament, since they were included by the Turkish Football Federation in the championship as military clubs and not as champions of a civilian regional league. All other participants qualified as regional champions for the competition played in knock-out format.

== Qualified clubs ==
Region	Champions
Istanbul	Beşiktaş
Ankara	Anadolu Turan San'atkârangücü
İzmir	Altay İdman Yurdu
Trabzon	Trabzon İdman Ocağı
Eskişehir	Eskişehir İdman Yurdu
Konya	Konya Gençlerbirliği
Çukurova	Adana Türk Ocağı
Bursa	San'atkâran Spor Derneği
Karesi	Balıkesir İdman Yurdu
Kocaeli	Adapazarı İdman Yurdu
Edirne	Edirne Türk Ocağı
Harbiye	Harbiye Mektebi İdman Yurdu
Bahriye	Bahriye Efrâd-ı Cedide İdman Yurdu

- The champions of Canik (Samsun) and Antalya regions are currently not known.
- In 1924 Trabzon Lisesi were champions of the Trabzon League, though a second tournament was held after the conclusion of the league in order to determine the participants for the Turkish championship. İdman Ocağı won that tournament and qualified for the national championship.

== First round ==
4 September 1924
09:30

Konya Gençlerbirliği	3 – 0	Trabzon İdman Ocağı

İstiklal Sahası, Ankara
4 September 1924
11:30

Beşiktaş	6 – 1	Eskişehir İdman Yurdu

İstiklal Sahası, Ankara
4 September 1924
16:00

Bahriye	7 – 0	Balıkesir İdman Yurdu

İstiklal Sahası, Ankara
4 September 1924
18:15

Anadolu Turan San'atkârangücü	2 – 0^{1}	Bursa San'atkâran

İstiklal Sahası, Ankara
5 September 1924
09:30

Samsun	walkover^{2}	Edirne Türk Ocağı

İstiklal Sahası, Ankara
5 September 1924
10:00

Harbiye	2 – 0	Adana Türk Ocağı

İstiklal Sahası, Ankara
5 September 1924
18:30

Adapazarı İdman Yurdu	2 – 0^{3}	Antalya

İstiklal Sahası, Ankara
- ^{1} Match could not be finished for lack of time. The remaining 15 minutes were played on 5 September.
- ^{2} The team of Canik did not show up. Edirne received a bye for the quarter-finals.
- ^{3} Only the first half was played. Second half played on 6 September.

=== Resumed matches ===
5 September 1924
16:00

Anadolu Turan San'atkârangücü	2 – 0	Bursa San'atkâran

İstiklal Sahası, Ankara
6 September 1924
09:30

Adapazarı İdman Yurdu	3 – 0	Antalya

İstiklal Sahası, Ankara
- Altay received a bye for the quarter-finals.

== Quarter-finals ==
6 September 1924
17:30

Bahriye	1 – 0	Edirne Türk Ocağı

İstiklal Sahası, Ankara
Referee: Necmi
7 September 1924
11:30

Altay	5 – 0	Adapazarı İdman Yurdu

İstiklal Sahası, Ankara
Referee: Hamdi Emin
7 September 1924
16:00

Beşiktaş	0 – 2	Harbiye

İstiklal Sahası, Ankara
7 September 1924
18:30

Anadolu Turan San'atkârangücü	2 – 1	Konya Gençlerbirliği

İstiklal Sahası, Ankara
Referee: Yusuf Ziya Öniş

== Semi-finals ==
9 September 1924
18:30

Harbiye	3 – 0	Altay

İstiklal Sahası, Ankara
10 September 1924
18:30

Bahriye	2 – 0	Anadolu Turan San'atkârangücü

İstiklal Sahası, Ankara

== Third place match ==
11 September 1924

Anadolu Turan San'atkârangücü	1 – 0	Altay
	Report

İstiklal Sahası, Ankara

== Final ==
12 September 1924
18:30

Harbiye	3 – 0	Bahriye
	Report

İstiklal Sahası, Ankara
Referee: Yusuf Ziya Öniş
