= 1942 Turkish Football Championship =

Tournament details
- Country: Turkey
- Dates: 23 May – 25 May

Final positions
- Champions: Harp Okulu (2nd Turkish title)
- Runners-up: Göztepe

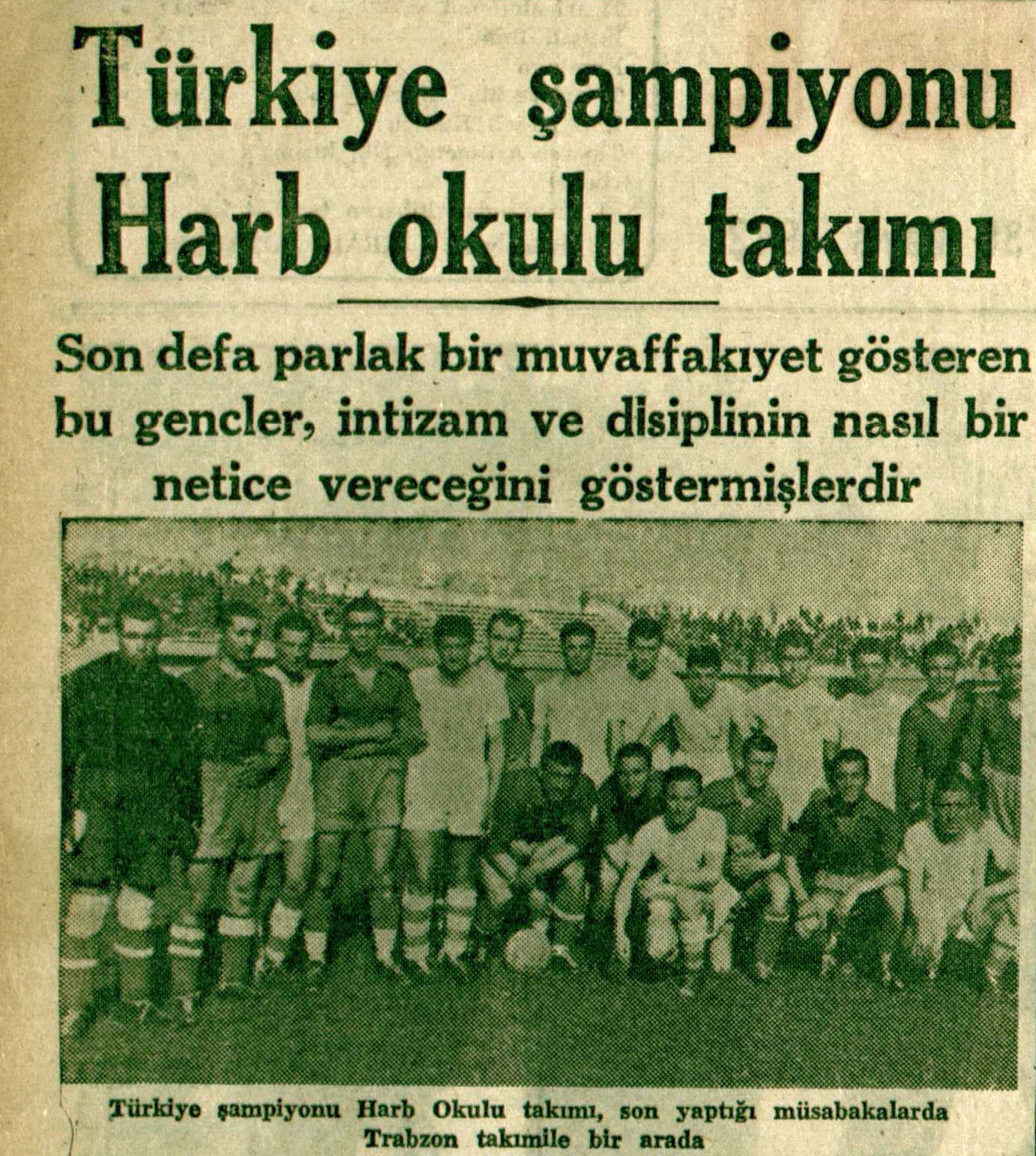
Harbiye: The 1942 Turkish Football Champion — *Cumhuriyet* Newspaper, May 30, 1942

The 1942 Turkish Football Championship was the ninth edition of the competition. It was held in May. Harp Okulu won their second national championship title by winning the Final Group in Ankara undefeated.

The champions of the three major regional leagues (Istanbul, Ankara, and İzmir) qualified directly for the Final Group. Trabzon Lisesi qualified by winning the qualification play-off, which was contested by the winners of the regional qualification groups.

== Final group ==
Pos	Team	Pld	W	D	L	GF	GA	GD	Pts
1	Harp Okulu	3	2	1	0	16	4	+12	8
2	Göztepe	3	2	0	1	7	9	−2	7
3	Beşiktaş	3	1	1	1	6	3	+3	6
4	Trabzon Lisesi	3	0	0	3	5	18	−13	3

Source: rsssf.com
23 May 1942
12:00

Harp Okulu	10 – 2	Trabzon Lisesi
	Report

19 Mayıs Stadium, Ankara
23 May 1942
14:00

Göztepe	2 – 1	Beşiktaş
	Report

19 Mayıs Stadium, Ankara
24 May 1942
12:00

Beşiktaş	4 – 0	Trabzon Lisesi
	Report

19 Mayıs Stadium, Ankara
Referee: Necdet Özgüç
24 May 1942
14:00

Harp Okulu	5 – 1	Göztepe
	Report

19 Mayıs Stadium, Ankara
25 May 1942
12:00

Göztepe	4 – 3	Trabzon Lisesi
	Report

19 Mayıs Stadium, Ankara
25 May 1942
14:00

Harp Okulu	1 – 1	Beşiktaş
	Report

19 Mayıs Stadium, Ankara
