= 1935 Turkish Football Championship =

Tournament details
- Country: Turkey
- Dates: 24 August – 8 September
- Teams: 22

Final positions
- Champions: Fenerbahçe (2nd Turkish title)
- Runners-up: Altınordu

The 1935 Turkish Football Championship was the sixth edition of the competition. Fenerbahçe won their second national championship title by defeating Altınordu 3–1 in the final. For Altınordu it was the club's third and last appearance in the championship final.

The various regional champions competed in a group stage of five groups of three to six teams each, with the group winners qualifying for the final stage.

== Group stage ==
=== Adana Group ===
==== Round 1 ====
25 August 1935	Adana Torosspor	5 – 1	Diyarbakır Yıldız	Adana
16:55

==== Group final ====
27 August 1935	Konya İdman Yurdu	2 – 6	Adana Torosspor	Adana
17:00				Referee: Şazi Tezcan

- Adana Torosspor won the group and qualified for the final stage.

=== Aydın Group ===
==== Round 1 ====
24 August 1935	Uşak Gençlerbirliği	6 – 1	Aydın SK	Aydın
17:00				Referee: Kemal Halim Gürgen

25 August 1935	Manisa Sakarya	4 – 0	Muğla Yaylaspor	Aydın
15:00				Referee: Sabahattin

25 August 1935	Çivril (Denizli)	1 – 6	Altınordu	Aydın
17:00				Referee: Doktor Abdürrahim

==== Semi-final ====
27 August 1935	Uşak Gençlerbirliği	void^{1}	Manisa Sakarya	Aydın
17:00				Referee: Kemal Halim Gürgen

- ^{1} Uşak Gençlerbirliği won 1–0, though the result was declared void since Uşak fielded an irregular player. Sakarya were awarded the win.
- Altınordu received a bye for the group final.

==== Group final ====
29 August 1935	Altınordu	4 – 1	Manisa Sakarya	Aydın
17:00				Referee: Şevki Aktuğ

- Altınordu won the group and qualified for the final stage.

=== Balıkesir Group ===
==== Round 1 ====
25 August 1935	Bursa San'atkâran	5 – 1	Gönen İdman Yurdu	Balıkesir
15:00				Stadium: General Ali Hikmet Stadium

25 August 1935	Çanakkale Türkgücü	0 – 8	Fenerbahçe	Balıkesir
17:00		Report		Stadium: General Ali Hikmet Stadium

- Balıkesir Spor Yurdu received a bye for the semi-final.

==== Semi-final ====
27 August 1935	Bursa San'atkâran	0 – 2	Balıkesir Spor Yurdu	Balıkesir
17:00				Stadium: General Ali Hikmet Stadium; Referee: Said Salahaddin

- Fenerbahçe received a bye for the group final.

==== Group final ====
29 August 1935	Balıkesir Spor Yurdu	1 – 5	Fenerbahçe	Balıkesir
17:00		Report		Stadium: General Ali Hikmet Stadium; Referee: Hamid Bey

- Fenerbahçe won the group and qualified for the final stage.

=== Eskişehir Group ===
==== Round 1 ====
25 August 1935	Eskişehir Demirspor	4 – 1	Afyon SK	Eskişehir
15:00		Report		Referee: Cafer Bey

25 August 1935	Isparta SK	0 – 8	Gençlerbirliği Ankara	Eskişehir
17:00		Report		Referee: Mamako Saim

==== Group final ====
27 August 1935	Eskişehir Demirspor	0 – 0^{1}	Gençlerbirliği Ankara	Eskişehir
17:40		Report		Referee: Cafer Bey

28 August 1935	Eskişehir Demirspor	2 – 0	Gençlerbirliği Ankara	Eskişehir
16:40		Report		Referee: Cafer Bey

- ^{1} Match could not be finished due to darkness. Replay was played on 28 August.

=== Trabzon Group ===
==== Round 1 ====
25 August 1935	Trabzon İdman Ocağı	1 – 3	Zonguldak Spor	Trabzon

27 August 1935	Samsun SK	6 – 0	Giresun SK	Trabzon

==== Group final ====
29 August 1935	Samsun SK	3 – 0	Zonguldak Spor	Trabzon
				Referee: Ali Haydar

- Samsun SK won the group and qualified for the final stage.

== Final stage ==
=== Round 1 ===
4 September 1935
15:00

Altınordu	3 – 2	Eskişehir Demirspor

Taksim Stadium, Istanbul
Referee: Şazi Tezcan
4 September 1935
17:00

Fenerbahçe	9 – 0	Adana Torosspor
	Report

Taksim Stadium, Istanbul
Referee: Nuri Bosut
- Samsun SK received a bye for the semi-final.

=== Semi-final ===
6 September 1935
17:00

Altınordu	4 – 2	Samsun SK

Taksim Stadium, Istanbul
Referee: Suphi Batur
- Fenerbahçe received a bye for the final.

=== Final ===
8 September 1935
17:00

Fenerbahçe	3 – 1	Altınordu
Şaban Topkanlı 1'; Niyazi Sel 45'; Naci Bastoncu 75'	Report	Adil 70' (pen.)

Taksim Stadium, Istanbul
Attendance: 5,000
Referee: Sadi Karsan
