= 1944 Turkish Football Championship =

Tournament details
- Country: Turkey
- Dates: 27 May – 30 May

Final positions
- Champions: Fenerbahçe (6th Turkish title)
- Runner-up: Harp Okulu

The 1944 Turkish Football Championship was the 10th edition of the competition. It was held in May. Fenerbahçe won their sixth national championship title by winning the Final Group in Ankara undefeated.

The champions of the three major regional leagues (Istanbul, Ankara, and İzmir) qualified directly for the Final Group. Mersin İdman Yurdu qualified by winning the qualification play-off, which was contested by the winners of the regional qualification groups.

== Final group ==
Pos	Team	Pld	W	D	L	GF	GA	GD	Pts
1	Fenerbahçe	3	3	0	0	11	4	+7	6
2	Harp Okulu	3	1	1	1	14	5	+9	3
3	Mersin İdman Yurdu	3	1	0	2	7	15	−8	2
4	Göztepe	3	0	1	2	3	11	−8	1

27 May 1944
13:00

Mersin İdman Yurdu	4 – 0	Göztepe
	Report

19 Mayıs Stadium, Ankara
27 May 1944
15:00

Harp Okulu	1 – 2	Fenerbahçe
	Report

19 Mayıs Stadium, Ankara
28 May 1944
13:00

Harp Okulu	11 – 1	Mersin İdman Yurdu
	Report

19 Mayıs Stadium, Ankara
28 May 1944
15:00

Fenerbahçe	5 – 1	Göztepe
Melih Kotanca 11', 52'; Naci Bastoncu 15', 85'; Fikret Kırcan 78'	Report	Sabahattin 3'

19 Mayıs Stadium, Ankara
Referee: Ziya Ozan
30 May 1944
13:00

Fenerbahçe	4 – 2	Mersin İdman Yurdu
	Report

19 Mayıs Stadium, Ankara
30 May 1944
15:00

Göztepe	2 – 2	Harp Okulu
	Report

19 Mayıs Stadium, Ankara

== See also ==
- 1944 Turkish National Division
- 1944 Prime Minister's Cup
