= 1949 Turkish Football Championship =

Tournament details
- Country: Turkey
- Dates: 2 June – 5 June

Final positions
- Champions: Ankaragücü (1st Turkish title)
- Runners-up: Galatasaray

The 1949 Turkish Football Championship was the 14th edition of the competition. It was held in June. Ankaragücü won their first and only national championship title by winning the Final Group in Ankara.

The champions of the three major regional leagues (Istanbul, Ankara, and İzmir) qualified directly for the Final Group. Eskişehir Demirspor qualified by winning the qualification play-off, which was contested by the winners of the regional qualification groups.

== Qualification play-off ==
=== First round ===
21 May 1949

Eskişehir Demirspor	1 – 0	Adana Demirspor

Eskişehir
22 May 1949

Samsun Fenerspor	2 – 1	Adana Demirspor

Eskişehir

=== Play-off final ===
23 May 1949

Eskişehir Demirspor	3 – 0	Samsun Fenerspor

Eskişehir

== Final group ==
Pos	Team	Pld	W	D	L	GF	GA	GD	Pts
1	Ankaragücü	3	3	0	0	9	4	+5	9
2	Galatasaray	3	2	0	1	6	4	+2	7
3	Eskişehir Demirspor	3	1	0	2	5	4	+1	5
4	İzmirspor	3	0	0	3	1	9	−8	3

2 June 1949
16:30

Eskişehir Demirspor	4 – 1	İzmirspor

19 Mayıs Stadium, Ankara
Referee: Faik Gökay
2 June 1949
18:30

Ankaragücü	4 – 3	Galatasaray
Fikret 45', 85'; Recep Adanır 80', 89'		Orhan Canpolat 16'; Muhtar Tunçaltan 21', 46'

19 Mayıs Stadium, Ankara
Referee: Ziya Ozan
4 June 1949
16:30

Galatasaray	1 – 0	Eskişehir Demirspor

19 Mayıs Stadium, Ankara
Referee: Faik Gökay
4 June 1949
18:30

Ankaragücü	3 – 0	İzmirspor

19 Mayıs Stadium, Ankara
Referee: Ziya Ozan
5 June 1949
16:30

Ankaragücü	2 – 1	Eskişehir Demirspor

19 Mayıs Stadium, Ankara
Referee: Ziya Ozan
5 June 1949
18:30

Galatasaray	2 – 0	İzmirspor

19 Mayıs Stadium, Ankara
Referee: Refik Güven
