= 1934 Turkish Football Championship =

Tournament details
- Country: Turkey
- Dates: 12 October – 29 October
- Teams: 22

Final positions
- Champions: Beşiktaş (1st Turkish title)
- Runners-up: Altay

The 1934 Turkish Football Championship was the fifth edition of the competition. It was held in October. Beşiktaş won their first national championship title by defeating Altay 3–1 in the final after overtime. For Altay it was the club's first appearance in the championship final, with one more to follow in 1951.

The various regional champions competed in a group stage of five groups of three to six teams each, with the group winners advancing to the Final Phase.

== Group stage ==
=== Antalya Group ===
==== Round 1 ====
16 October 1934	Antalya	1 – 2	Seyhanspor	Antalya

16 October 1934	Isparta	? – ?^{1}	Muğla	Antalya

- ^{1} Result not available. Isparta won the match and advanced to the group final.

==== Group final ====
18 October 1934	Isparta	3 – 0	Seyhanspor	Antalya

- Isparta won the group and qualified for the final stage.

=== Istanbul Group ===
==== Round 1 ====
12 October 1934	Bandırma İdman Yurdu	3 – 0	Kolordu İdman Yurdu	Istanbul
12:00				Stadium: Şeref Stadium

12 October 1934	Beşiktaş	6 – 0	Çanakkale Türkgücü	Istanbul
14:00		Report		Stadium: Şeref Stadium

12 October 1934	Bursa San'atkâran	4 – 1	Adapazarı İdman Yurdu	Istanbul
16:00				Stadium: Şeref Stadium; Referee: Ahmet Bey

==== Semi-final ====
14 October 1934	Beşiktaş	3 – 0	Bandırma İdman Yurdu	Istanbul
		Report		Stadium: Şeref Stadium

- Bursa San'atkâran received a bye for the group final.

==== Group final ====
16 October 1934	Beşiktaş	6 – 2	Bursa San'atkâran	Istanbul
		Report		Stadium: Şeref Stadium

- Beşiktaş won the group and qualified for the final stage.

=== Konya Group ===
==== Round 1 ====
12 October 1934	Konya İdman Yurdu	4 – 0^{1}	Afyon Spor	Konya
13:35

12 October 1934	Çankaya	3 – 2	Eskişehir Demirspor	Konya
15:30				Referee: Kemal Halim Gürgen

- ^{1} Declared void as Konya İdman Yurdu fielded a player without license. Afyon Spor were awarded the win.

==== Semi-final ====
14 October 1934	Çankaya	walkover^{2}	Kütahya Türkspor	Konya

- ^{2} The licenses of Kütahya did not arrive in time. Çankaya were awarded the win and qualified for the group final.
- Afyon Spor received a bye for the group final.

==== Group final ====
16 October 1934	Çankaya	8 – 0	Afyon Spor	Ankara

- Çankaya won the group and qualified for the final stage.

=== Samsun Group ===
==== Round 1 ====
12 October 1934	Trabzon İdman Ocağı	2 – 0	Giresun SK	Samsun

==== Group final ====
14 October 1934	Samsun İdman Yurdu	1 – 1^{1}	Trabzon İdman Ocağı	Samsun
				Referee: Şazi Tezcan

- ^{1} Trabzon İdman Ocağı did not show up at overtime. Samsun İdman Yurdu were awarded the win and qualified for the final stage.

=== Uşak Group ===
==== Round 1 ====
12 October 1934	Altay	3 – 2	Uşak Turan İdman Yurdu	Uşak

12 October 1934	Söke (Aydın)	4 – 1	Denizli	Uşak

==== Group final ====
14 October 1934	Altay	3 – 0	Söke (Aydın)	Uşak
				Referee: Niyazi Bey

- Altay won the group and qualified for the final stage.

== Final stage ==
=== Round 1 ===
24 October 1934
14:00

Isparta	0 – 10	Altay

Gazi Stadium, Bursa
Referee: Nuri Bosut
24 October 1934
16:00

Çankaya	2 – 4	Beşiktaş
	Report

Gazi Stadium, Bursa
Referee: Niyazi Bey
- Samsun İdman Yurdu received a bye for the semi-final.

=== Semi-final ===
26 October 1934
16:00

Samsun İdman Yurdu	2 – 7	Beşiktaş
	Report

Gazi Stadium, Bursa
Referee: Şazi Tezcan
- Altay received a bye for the final.

=== Final ===
29 October 1934
16:00

Altay	1 – 3 (a.e.t.)	Beşiktaş
Vahap Özaltay 1'	Report	Hakkı Yeten 46' (pen.); Nazım Onar; Şeref Görkey

Gazi Stadium, Bursa
Attendance: 3,000
Referee: Herr Obis (Hungary)
