= 1947 Turkish Football Championship =

Tournament details
- Country: Turkey
- Dates: 24 May–26 May
- Teams: 3

Final positions
- Champions: Ankara Demirspor (1st Turkish title)
- Runners-up: Fenerbahçe

The 1947 Turkish Football Championship was the 13th edition of the competition. It was held in May. Ankara Demirspor won their first and only national championship title by winning the Final Group in Ankara undefeated.

The champions of the Istanbul and Ankara regional leagues qualified directly for the Final Group. Adana Demirspor qualified by winning the qualification play-off, which was contested by the winners of the regional qualification groups. The İzmir champions did not participate this year.

== Final group ==
Pos	Team	Pld	W	D	L	GF	GA	GD	Pts
1	Ankara Demirspor	2	2	0	0	9	0	+9	4
2	Fenerbahçe	2	1	0	1	6	3	+3	2
3	Adana Demirspor	2	0	0	2	0	12	−12	0

24 May 1947	Fenerbahçe	6 – 0	Adana Demirspor	Ankara
	Suphi Ural 15', 38'; Fikret Kırcan 25'; Halil Özyazıcı 65', 87'; Halit Deringör 74'	Report		Stadium: 19 Mayıs Stadium

25 May 1947	Ankara Demirspor	3 – 0	Fenerbahçe	Ankara
	Gündüz Kılıç 5', 42'; Rıdvan 90'	Report		Stadium: 19 Mayıs Stadium

26 May 1947	Ankara Demirspor	6 – 0	Adana Demirspor	Ankara
		Report		Stadium: 19 Mayıs Stadium

== See also ==
- 1947 Turkish National Division
- 1947 Prime Minister's Cup
