= Eskişehir Football League =

The Eskişehir Football League (Turkish: Eskişehir Futbol Ligi) was founded as a regional football league for Eskişehir based clubs in 1924. Although it was held a few years before 1924 already, it gained official status in 1924 as the national football association was founded in 1923 and began organising the regional leagues. In the period from 1924 to 1935, the winners of the Eskişehir League qualified for the former Turkish Football Championship. In 1940 Eskişehir Demirspor won the Turkish championship against Fenerbahçe, marking a turning point in Turkish football as clubs from Istanbul, Ankara, and İzmir were the dominating sides in those decades. By achieving this feat, they were included in the 1941 National Division, which included only the clubs of the three major regional leagues until that point.

In the following period from 1941 to 1951, the Eskişehir league winners qualified for the qualifying stages of the Turkish Championship. After the introduction of the professional nationwide league in 1959, the league lost its first level status. Eskişehir Demirspor hold the record with 22 championship titles won.

== Participated teams ==
The following teams participated in the league regularly for at least a few years:

- Eskişehir Demirspor
- Eskişehir İdman Yurdu
- Eskişehir Gençlerbirliği
- Eskişehir Altay
- Eskişehir Tayyare Yurdu
- Havagücü
- Hava Harp Okulu
- Eskişehir Şekerspor

== Champions ==
Season	Champions
1920-21	Eskişehir İdman Yurdu
1923-24	Eskişehir İdman Yurdu
1924-25	Eskişehir İdman Yurdu
1925-26	Eskişehir İdman Yurdu
1926-27	Eskişehir İdman Yurdu
1927-28	Eskişehir İdman Yurdu
1928-29	Eskişehir İdman Yurdu
1929-30	Eskişehir İdman Yurdu
1930-31	Eskişehir İdman Yurdu
1931-32	Eskişehir İdman Yurdu
1932-33	Eskişehir İdman Yurdu
1933-34	Eskişehir Demirspor
1934-35	Eskişehir Demirspor
1935-36	Eskişehir İdman Yurdu
1936-37	Eskişehir Demirspor
1937-38	Eskişehir Demirspor
1938-39	Eskişehir Demirspor
1939-40	Eskişehir Demirspor
1940–41	Eskişehir Demirspor
1941–42	Eskişehir Demirspor
1942–43	Eskişehir Demirspor
1943–44	Eskişehir Demirspor
1944–45	Eskişehir Demirspor
1945–46	Eskişehir Demirspor
1946–47	Eskişehir Demirspor
1947–48	Eskişehir Demirspor
1948–49	Eskişehir Demirspor
1949–50	Eskişehir Havagücü
1950–51	Eskişehir Şekerspor
1951–52	Eskişehir Demirspor
1952–53	Eskişehir Demirspor
1953–54	Eskişehir Demirspor
1954–55	Eskişehir Demirspor
1955–56	Eskişehir Demirspor
1956–57	Eskişehir Demirspor
1957–58	Eskişehir Demirspor
1958–59	Eskişehir Şekerspor

== Performance by club ==
Club	Titles
Eskişehir Demirspor	22
Eskişehir İdman Yurdu	12
Eskişehir Şekerspor	2
Eskişehir Havagücü	1
