= 1946 Turkish Football Championship =

Tournament details
- Country: Turkey
- Dates: 25 May – 28 May

Final positions
- Champions: Gençlerbirliği (2nd Turkish title)
- Runner-up: Beşiktaş

The 1946 Turkish Football Championship was the 12th edition of the competition. It was held in May. Gençlerbirliği won their second national championship title by winning the Final Group in Ankara undefeated.

The champions of the three major regional leagues (Istanbul, Ankara, and İzmir) qualified directly for the Final Group. Eskişehir Demirspor qualified by winning the qualification play-off, which was contested by the winners of the regional qualification groups.

== Final group ==
Pos	Team	Pld	W	D	L	GF	GA	GD	Pts
1	Gençlerbirliği	3	3	0	0	7	3	+4	9
2	Beşiktaş	3	2	0	1	6	5	+1	7
3	Eskişehir Demirspor	3	1	0	2	11	8	+3	5
4	Altay	3	0	0	3	2	10	−8	3

25 May 1946

Gençlerbirliği	2 – 1	Beşiktaş
Ali Polat 11'; Mustafa Kökçam 56'	Report	Sabri Gençsoy 40'

19 Mayıs Stadium, Ankara
Attendance: 20,000
Referee: Zülbahar Sağnak
25 May 1946

Eskişehir Demirspor	7 – 1	Altay
	Report

19 Mayıs Stadium, Ankara
Attendance: 20,000
Referee: Şazi Tezcan
27 May 1946

Gençlerbirliği	1 – 0	Altay
Hasan Polat 10'	Report

19 Mayıs Stadium, Ankara
Referee: Şazi Tezcan
27 May 1946

Beşiktaş	3 – 2	Eskişehir Demirspor
Sabri Gençsoy 16', 64'; Faruk Sağnak 72'	Report	Abdullah; Rauf 44'

19 Mayıs Stadium, Ankara
Referee: Zülbahar Sağnak
28 May 1946

Gençlerbirliği	4 – 2	Eskişehir Demirspor
Ali 2'; Hamdi Ülgen 26', 71', 89'	Report	Sait Ozan (o.g.); Mehmet 44'

19 Mayıs Stadium, Ankara
Attendance: 20,000
Referee: Şazi Tezcan
28 May 1946

Beşiktaş	2 – 1^{1}	Altay
Şükrü D. 4', 6'	Report	Basri D. 15'

19 Mayıs Stadium, Ankara
Attendance: 20,000
Referee: Ömer
- ^{1} After Altay's equalizer in the 28th minute was cancelled due to offside, the referee intended to send off an Altay player because of excessive protest. As a result, the entire Altay team walked off. Beşiktaş were awarded the win with 2–1.
