= 1932 Turkish Football Championship =

Tournament details
- Country: Turkey
- Dates: 30 September – 21 October
- Teams: 20

Final positions
- Champions: İstanbulspor (1st Turkish title)
- Runners-up: Altınordu

The 1932 Turkish Football Championship was the third edition of the competition. İstanbulspor won their first and only championship title by defeating Altınordu 3–0 in the final. For Altınordu it was the club's second appearance in the final, with one more to follow in 1935.

The various regional champions competed in a group stage of five groups of three to six teams each, with the group winners qualifying for the final stage.

== Group stage ==
=== Eskişehir Group ===
==== Round 1 ====
7 October 1932	Gençlerbirliği Ankara	8 – 1	Bursa San'atkâran	Eskişehir
14:00		Report		Referee: Cemal

7 October 1932	Kütahya Türkspor	1 – 17	Eskişehir Tayyare İdman Yurdu	Eskişehir
17:00		Report		Referee: Yunus

==== Group final ====
9 October 1932	Eskişehir Tayyare İdman Yurdu	4 – 2	Gençlerbirliği Ankara	Eskişehir
17:00		Report		Referee: Celal

- Eskişehir Tayyare İdman Yurdu won the group and qualified for the final stage.

=== Istanbul Group ===
==== Round 1 ====
7 October 1932	İstanbulspor	6 – 1	Adapazarı İdman Yurdu	Istanbul
14:30				Stadium: Fenerbahçe Stadium; Referee: Nuri

- Bandırma İdman Yurdu received a bye for the group final.

==== Group final ====
9 October 1932	İstanbulspor	11 – 0	Bandırma İdman Yurdu	Istanbul
				Stadium: Fenerbahçe Stadium; Referee: Nuri

- İstanbulspor won the group and qualified for the final stage.

=== İzmir Group ===
==== Round 1 ====
30 September 1932	Balıkesir İdman Birliği	4 – 0	Manisa İdman Yurdu	İzmir
14:30				Stadium: Alsancak Stadium; Referee: Refik Osman

30 September 1932	Isparta SK	6 – 0	Denizli İdman Yurdu	İzmir
16:30				Stadium: Alsancak Stadium; Referee: Yusuf Ziya Öniş

2 October 1932	Altınordu	5 – 0	Uşak İdman Yurdu	İzmir
16:00				Stadium: Alsancak Stadium; Referee: Fehmi

==== Semi-final ====
2 October 1932	Balıkesir İdman Birliği	1 – 1	Isparta SK	İzmir
14:00				Stadium: Alsancak Stadium; Referee: Fehmi

4 October 1932	Balıkesir İdman Birliği	forfeit^{1}	Isparta SK	İzmir
16:00				Stadium: Alsancak Stadium

- ^{1} Isparta SK protested against a player of Balıkesir İdman Birliği. As the protest was declined Isparta SK left the field and Balıkesir were awarded the win.
- Altınordu received a bye for the group final.

==== Group final ====
7 October 1932	Altınordu	7 – 1	Balıkesir İdman Birliği	İzmir
16:00				Stadium: Alsancak Stadium; Referee: Fehmi

- Altınordu won the group and qualified for the final stage.

=== Mersin Group ===
==== Round 1 ====
30 September 1932	Antalya	1 – 0	Diyarbakır Ayspor	Mersin
				Stadium: Mersin Sahası

30 September 1932	Konya İdman Yurdu	3 – 3	Mersin İdman Yurdu	Mersin
				Stadium: Mersin Sahası

3 October 1932	Konya İdman Yurdu	2 – 1	Mersin İdman Yurdu	Mersin
				Stadium: Mersin Sahası

==== Group final ====
5 October 1932	Konya İdman Yurdu	3 – 1	Antalya	Mersin
				Stadium: Mersin Sahası

- Konya İdman Yurdu won the group and qualified for the final stage.

=== Samsun Group ===
==== Round 1 ====
30 September 1932	Giresun Hilalspor	1 – 1	Samsun İdman Yurdu	Samsun
				Referee: Kemal Rıfat Kalpakçıoğlu

1 October 1932	Giresun Hilalspor	1 – 3	Samsun İdman Yurdu	Samsun
				Referee: Kemal Rıfat Kalpakçıoğlu

- Trabzon İdman Ocağı received a bye for the group final.

==== Group final ====
3 October 1932	Samsun İdman Yurdu	1 – 2	Trabzon İdman Ocağı	Samsun
15:00				Referee: Kemal Rıfat Kalpakçıoğlu

- Trabzon İdman Ocağı won the group and qualified for the final stage.

== Final stage ==
=== Round 1 ===
14 October 1932

İstanbulspor	4 – 3 (a.e.t.)	Konya İdman Yurdu

Alsancak Stadium, İzmir
Referee: Cafer Bey
14 October 1932

Altınordu	2 – 1	Trabzon İdman Ocağı

Alsancak Stadium, İzmir
Referee: Abdullah Bey
- Eskişehir Tayyare İdman Yurdu received a bye for the semi-final.

=== Semi-final ===
16 October 1932

İstanbulspor	2 – 0	Eskişehir Tayyare İdman Yurdu

Alsancak Stadium, İzmir
Referee: Fehmi Bey
- Altınordu received a bye for the final.

=== Final ===
21 October 1932

Altınordu	0 – 3	İstanbulspor
		Nihat 8'; Tevfik 43'; Salahattin 72'

Alsancak Stadium, İzmir
Referee: Niyazi Bey
