= 1951 Turkish Football Championship =

Tournament details
- Country: Turkey
- Dates: 25 May – 27 May

Final positions
- Champions: Beşiktaş (5th Turkish title)
- Runners-up: Altay

The 1951 Turkish Football Championship was the 16th and last edition of the competition. It was held in May. Beşiktaş won their fifth national championship title by winning the Final Group in Balıkesir.

The champions of the three major regional leagues (Istanbul, Ankara, and İzmir) qualified directly for the Final Group. Adana Demirspor qualified by winning the qualification play-off, which was contested by the winners of the regional qualification groups.

When Turkish football became officially professional on 24 September 1951, the competition continued under the name Turkish Amateur Football Championship, with only amateur teams participating. However, from that year on it was no longer the first tier football championship in Turkey.

== Qualification play-off ==
=== First round ===
17 May 1951
16:00

| Aydın Gençlik | 3 – 0 | Zonguldak Kömürspor |

Bursa
Referee: Muzaffer Ertuğ
17 May 1951
18:00

| Malatya Sümerspor | 1 – 2 | Adana Demirspor |

Bursa
Referee: Feridun Kılıç

=== Semi-finals ===
18 May 1951
17:00

| Adana Demirspor | 3 – 1 | Adapazarı Gençlik |

Bursa
Referee: Feridun Kılıç
19 May 1951
17:30

| Aydın Gençlik | 2 – 4 | Tavşanlı Linyitspor |

Bursa
Referee: Muzaffer Ertuğ

=== Final ===
20 May 1951
18:00

| Adana Demirspor | 2 – 0 | Tavşanlı Linyitspor |

Bursa
Referee: Muzaffer Ertuğ

== Final group ==
| Pos | Team | Pld | W | D | L | GF | GA | GD | Pts |
|---|---|---|---|---|---|---|---|---|---|
| 1 | Beşiktaş | 3 | 3 | 0 | 0 | 13 | 3 | +10 | 9 |
| 2 | Altay | 3 | 2 | 0 | 1 | 8 | 9 | −1 | 7 |
| 3 | Adana Demirspor | 3 | 0 | 1 | 2 | 7 | 12 | −5 | 4 |
| 4 | Gençlerbirliği | 3 | 0 | 1 | 2 | 2 | 6 | −4 | 4 |

Source: rsssf.com
25 May 1951
16:00

| Beşiktaş | 6 – 2 | Adana Demirspor |

Balıkesir Atatürk Stadium, Balıkesir
Referee: Zülbahar Sağnak
25 May 1951
18:00

| Gençlerbirliği | 1 – 2 | Altay |

Balıkesir Atatürk Stadium, Balıkesir
Referee: Sulhi Garan
26 May 1951
16:00

| Beşiktaş | 4 – 1 | Altay |

Balıkesir Atatürk Stadium, Balıkesir
Referee: Zülbahar Sağnak
26 May 1951
18:00

| Gençlerbirliği | 1 – 1 | Adana Demirspor |

Balıkesir Atatürk Stadium, Balıkesir
Referee: Sulhi Garan
27 May 1951
16:00

| Beşiktaş | 3 – 0 | Gençlerbirliği |

Balıkesir Atatürk Stadium, Balıkesir
Referee: Zülbahar Sağnak
27 May 1951
18:00

| Altay | 5 – 4 | Adana Demirspor |

Balıkesir Atatürk Stadium, Balıkesir
Referee: Sulhi Garan
