= Necati Özçağlayan =

Turkish footballer

Personal information
- Full name: Necati Özçağlayan
- Date of birth: 15 May 1953 (age 73)
- Place of birth: Trabzon, Turkey
- Height: 1.83 m (6 ft 0 in)
- Position: Defender

Youth career
- 1970–1972: Trabzon Yolspor

Senior career*
Years	Team	Apps	(Gls)
1972–1986	Trabzonspor	374	(1)

International career^{‡}
1975	Turkey U21	4	(0)
1975–1981	Turkey	22	(0)

Managerial career
- 1998: Adana Demirspor
- * Club domestic league appearances and goals as of 1 August 2017 ‡ National team caps and goals as of 1 August 2017

Necati Özçağlayan (born 15 May 1953) is a Turkish retired professional football player who played as a defender. A one club man for Trabzonspor, Necati was part of the club from 1972-1986 and won all 6 of Trabzonspor's Süper Lig titles during his playing career.

== International career ==
Necati was an international for the Turkey national football team, making his debut in a 2-2 friendly match with Romania on 12 October 1975.
