= 1950 Turkish Football Championship =

Tournament details
- Country: Turkey
- Dates: 1 June – 11 June

Final positions
- Champions: Göztepe (1st Turkish title)
- Runners-up: Gençlerbirliği

The 1950 Turkish Football Championship was the 15th edition of the competition. It was held in June. Göztepe won their first and only national championship title by winning the Final Group in İzmir.

The champions of the three major regional leagues (Istanbul, Ankara, and İzmir) qualified directly for the Final Group. İzmit Kağıtspor qualified by winning the qualification play-off, which was contested by the winners of the regional qualification groups.

== Final group ==
Pos	Team	Pld	W	D	L	GF	GA	GD	Pts
1	Göztepe	6	5	0	1	12	3	+9	16
2	Gençlerbirliği	6	4	1	1	11	8	+3	15
3	Beşiktaş	6	2	1	3	10	7	+3	11
4	İzmit Kağıtspor	6	0	0	6	3	18	−15	6

Source: rsssf.com
1 June 1950
16:00

Gençlerbirliği	2 – 1	İzmit Kağıtspor

Alsancak Stadium, İzmir
1 June 1950
18:00

Beşiktaş	1 – 2	Göztepe

Alsancak Stadium, İzmir
Referee: Muzaffer Ertuğ
3 June 1950
16:00

Beşiktaş	4 – 0	İzmit Kağıtspor

Alsancak Stadium, İzmir
Referee: Bedri Kaya
3 June 1950
18:00

Gençlerbirliği	1 – 0	Göztepe

Alsancak Stadium, İzmir
4 June 1950
16:00

Göztepe	2 – 0	İzmit Kağıtspor

Alsancak Stadium, İzmir
4 June 1950
18:00

Gençlerbirliği	1 – 1	Beşiktaş

Alsancak Stadium, İzmir
7 June 1950
16:00

Gençlerbirliği	4 – 1	İzmit Kağıtspor

Alsancak Stadium, İzmir
7 June 1950
18:00

Beşiktaş	0 – 1	Göztepe

Alsancak Stadium, İzmir
Referee: Muzaffer Ertuğ
10 June 1950
16:00

Beşiktaş	3 – 1	İzmit Kağıtspor

Alsancak Stadium, İzmir
Referee: Salahattin Tetik
10 June 1950
18:00

Gençlerbirliği	1 – 4	Göztepe

Alsancak Stadium, İzmir
Referee: Orhan Tümer
11 June 1950
16:00

Göztepe	3 – 0	İzmit Kağıtspor

Alsancak Stadium, İzmir
11 June 1950
18:00

Gençlerbirliği	2 – 1	Beşiktaş

Alsancak Stadium, İzmir
