= Turgay Semercioğlu =

Turkish footballer

Turgay Semercioğlu (born 25 February 1954) is a former Turkish footballer. He was a very successful player, playing for Trabzonspor and the Turkey national football team.

He played for Trabzonspor during their dominance of Turkish football. In his time there, he won six league championships, as well as playing 31 times for the national team. He even set a record (at the time) of playing in 29 consecutive international matches. He played in defense as a right back, and was known for his excellent defending, as well as his runs into the opposition half. He was one of the undisputed stars of the 'Trabzonspor Efsanesi' team of the late seventies and early eighties.

After his playing days were over he became involved with the highly successful Trabzonspor youth academy. He helped to develop and train many of the players who would later play for the senior team. In December 2003, he was briefly put in charge of the Trabzonspor first team whilst a new manager was scouted and following the election of a new president, Atay Aktuğ, he resigned to make way for a new manager.

Fans and critics alike remember him as a gifted Turkish footballer.
