= Harp Okulu S.K. =

Sports Club of the Turkish Military Academy

Harp Okulu SK
- Full name: Harp Okulu Spor Kulübü
- Team history: Harbiye
- Based in: Ankara, Turkey
- Colors: Red and white

Harp Okulu SK, formerly known as Harbiye, is the sports club of the Turkish Military Academy based in Ankara, Turkey. Originally founded in Istanbul under the name Harbiye, the club relocated to the capital Ankara in 1936. The name was changed to Harp Okulu in the following years. Being active in numerous sports, the club has won its greatest successes in football and basketball.

The football department won the Turkish Football Championship in 1924 and thus became the first champions in Turkish football history. In the 1940s they won the championship title again in 1942 and 1945. The basketball department won the former Turkish Basketball Championship twice in a row in 1951 and 1952.

== Honours ==
=== Football ===
- Turkish Football Championship
  - Winners (3) (shared-record): 1924, 1942, 1945
  - Runners-up (1): 1944
- Prime Minister's Cup
  - Runners-up (1): 1945
- Ankara Football League
  - Winners (4): 1937–38, 1941–42, 1943–44, 1944–45

=== Basketball ===
- Turkish Basketball Championship
  - Winners (2): 1951, 1952
  - Runners-up (2): 1949, 1950

=== Volleyball ===
- Turkish Volleyball Championship
  - Runners-up (1): 1963
