= 1940 Turkish Football Championship =

Tournament details
- Country: Turkey
- Dates: 21 September – 22 September

Final positions
- Champions: Eskişehir Demirspor (1st Turkish title)
- Runner-up: Fenerbahçe

The 1940 Turkish Football Championship was the seventh edition of the competition. Eskişehir Demirspor won their first and only national championship title by defeating Fenerbahçe in the final. For Eskişehir Demirspor it was the club's first and sole appearance in the championship final.

After four years of interruption the championship was resumed again and was held in a new format. In 1937 the Turkish National Division was introduced, which was the national league contested by the top clubs of the three major leagues of Istanbul, Ankara, and İzmir. The remaining cities which were not included in the National Division played in regional qualification groups like in the previous years, with the group winners competing against each other in a play-off. The club winning the play-off in 1940, Eskişehir Demirspor, played against 1940 Turkish National Division winners Fenerbahçe. Eskişehir Demirspor defeated Fenerbahçe in the final and thus became the first Turkish champions from outside Istanbul and Ankara.

== Final ==
21 September 1940

Eskişehir Demirspor	0 – 0	Fenerbahçe
	Report

19 Mayıs Stadium, Ankara
22 September 1940

Eskişehir Demirspor	3 – 1	Fenerbahçe
İsmail Çınar; İskender Gürpınar	Report	Mehmet Reşat Nayır

19 Mayıs Stadium, Ankara

== See also ==
- 1940 Turkish National Division
