= Çukurova Football League =

Turkish football league

Çukurova Football League (Turkish: Çukurova Futbol Ligi)
- Founded: 1924
- First season: 1924
- Folded: 1959
- Country: Turkey
- Confederation: UEFA
- Divisions: 1
- Level on pyramid: 1
- Domestic cup: Prime Minister's Cup
- League cup: Turkish Football Championship
- Last champions: Adana Demirspor (1959)
- Most championships: Adana Demirspor

The Çukurova Football League (Turkish: Çukurova Futbol Ligi), also known as the Adana Football League (Turkish: Adana Futbol Ligi), was founded as a regional football league for Adana and Mersin based clubs in 1924. The name of the league comes from Çukurova region. In some years clubs from Maraş and Malatya also participated in the league. In Adana, the football game was played during the 1910s. Adana Türk Gücü were the first club in Adana founded in 1913. The league was played within a year until 1936.

In the period from 1924 to 1935, the winners of the Çukurova League qualified for the former Turkish Football Championship. Later from 1940 to 1951, they qualified for the qualifying stages of the national championship. In 1955 professionalism was introduced in the league, hence the name officially became Adana Profesyonel Ligi (Adana Professional League). After the introduction of the professional nationwide league in 1959, known as Süper Lig today, the league lost its first level status. Adana Demirspor are the most successful club in the history of the league, having won a record 15 championship titles.

== Participated teams ==
The following teams participated in the league regularly for at least a few years:

- Adana Demirspor
- Adana Torosspor
- Adana Türk Gücü
- Mersin İdman Yurdu
- Adana Seyhanspor
- Adana Millî Mensucat
- Adana İdman Yurdu
- Adana Türk Ocağı
- Silifke İdman Yurdu
- Tarsus İdman Yurdu

== Champions ==
Season	Champions
1923	Adana Türk Ocağı
1924	Adana Türk Ocağı
1925	Adana Türk Ocağı
1926	Mersin İdman Yurdu
1927	Mersin İdman Yurdu
1928	Adana Seyhanspor
1929	Adana İdman Yurdu
1930	Adana İdman Yurdu
1931	Mersin İdman Yurdu
1932	Topçu Alayı Gücü
1933	Mersin İdman Yurdu
1934	Adana Seyhanspor
1935	Adana Torosspor
1936	Adana İdman Yurdu
1936-37	Adana İdman Yurdu
1937-38	Adana İdman Yurdu
1938-39	Adana İdman Yurdu
1939-40	Adana Millî Mensucat
1940-41	Adana Millî Mensucat
1941-42	Adana Millî Mensucat
1942-43	Adana Demirspor
1943-44	Adana Demirspor
1944-45	Adana Demirspor
1945-46	Adana Demirspor
1946-47	Adana Demirspor
1947-48	Adana Demirspor
1948-49	Adana Torosspor
1949-50	Adana Demirspor
1950-51	Adana Demirspor
1951-52	Adana Demirspor
1952-53	Adana Demirspor
1953-54	Adana Demirspor
1954-55	Adana Demirspor
1955-56	Adana Millî Mensucat
1956-57	Adana Demirspor
1957-58	Adana Demirspor
1958-59	Adana Demirspor

== Performance by club ==
Club	Titles
Adana Demirspor	15
Adana İdman Yurdu	6
Mersin İdman Yurdu	4
Adana Millî Mensucat	4
Adana Türk Ocağı	3
Adana Seyhanspor	2
Adana Torosspor	2
Topçu Alayı Gücü	1
