= Turkish Football Championship =

Türkiye Futbol Şampiyonası
- Founded: 1924
- Folded: 1951
- Country: Turkey
- Number of clubs: various
- Level on pyramid: 1
- Relegation to: None
- Domestic cup: Prime Minister's Cup
- Last champions: Beşiktaş (2nd title)
- Most championships: Fenerbahçe (3 titles); Harp Okulu (3 titles)

The Turkish Football Championship (Turkish: Türkiye Futbol Şampiyonası) was a top-level football competition in Turkey. It was the first nationwide championship in Turkish football history. The championship was organised by the Turkish Football Federation (then called Futbol Hey'et-i Müttehidesi). The tournament system was based on a knockout competition, contested between the winners of each of the country's regional leagues.

After 1951 and the professionalization of Turkish football, the competition continued under the name Turkish Amateur Football Championship (Turkish: Türkiye Amatör Futbol Şampiyonası) with a completely different status. It was no longer the top-flight championship in Turkey, leaving only amateur teams as participants.

Fenerbahçe and Harp Okulu are the most successful clubs with three titles.

== History ==
Turkish newspaper Akşam announcing the Turkish championship title of Fenerbahçe on 11 November 1933

The first competition was held in 1924. Qualified for the tournament were the champions of the various Turkish regional leagues. The only exceptions were Harbiye and Bahriye, the clubs of the Turkish Military Academy and Naval Academy respectively. Both clubs were included by the Turkish Football Federation (TFF) as military clubs, and not as champions of a civilian regional league. Then the competition was not held for the following two years due to insufficient funds.

In 1927 the Turkish government funded the championship and the expenses of the clubs, so that they could afford the trip to the capital Ankara, where all matches took place in the first two editions. The third edition was started in 1932 and the series continued until the end of the season in 1935.

The competition was not held for the following four years. In this period the Turkish National Division, the first national football league in Turkey, was introduced by the TFF. From 1940 to 1950, both national championships were held at the same time. The difference between both tournaments was the competition system and the qualification criteria. In 1944 a special super cup, the Prime Minister's Cup, was launched by the TFF, which was competed by the winners of both championships. It was one of the earliest football super cups in the world. The cup was held in that format until 1950, when the National Division was concluded.

The championship was resumed again in 1940 and was played every year (except for 1943 and 1948) until 1951. In 1942 a new format was introduced. From this year on the champions were decided in the so-called Final Group, which consisted of the champions of the three major regional leagues (Istanbul, Ankara, and İzmir Leagues), and the winners of a qualification play-off, contested by the winners of the regional qualification groups. The 1951 edition was the last one as the top-level championship, as Turkish football became professional in September 1951. From then on the competition continued under the name Turkish Amateur Football Championship until 1996, consisting only of amateur teams.

== Champions ==
Year	Winners	Runners-up
1924	Harbiye (1)	Bahriye
1925–26	Not held due to insufficient funds.	
1927	Muhafızgücü (1)	Altınordu
1928–31	Not held due to the 1928 Summer Olympics in Amsterdam and insufficient funds.	
1932	İstanbulspor (1)	Altınordu
1933	Fenerbahçe (1)	İzmirspor
1934	Beşiktaş (1)	Altay
1935	Fenerbahçe (2)	Altınordu
1936–39	Not held due to the introduction of the National League.	
1940	Eskişehir Demirspor (1)	Fenerbahçe
1941	Gençlerbirliği (1)	Beşiktaş
1942	Harp Okulu (2)	Göztepe
1943	Not held	
1944	Fenerbahçe (3)	Harp Okulu
1945	Harp Okulu (3)	İzmit Harp Filosu
1946	Gençlerbirliği (2)	Beşiktaş
1947	Ankara Demirspor (1)	Fenerbahçe
1948	Not held due to the 1948 Summer Olympics in London.	
1949	Ankaragücü (1)	Galatasaray
1950	Göztepe (1)	Gençlerbirliği
1951	Beşiktaş (2)	Altay

== Performance by club ==
Club	Titles	Runners-up	Years won
Fenerbahçe	3	2	1933, 1935, 1944
Harp Okulu	3	1	1924, 1942, 1945
Beşiktaş	2	2	1934, 1951
Gençlerbirliği	2	1	1941, 1946
Göztepe	1	1	1950
Muhafızgücü	1	–	1927
İstanbulspor	1	–	1932
Eskişehir Demirspor	1	–	1940
Ankara Demirspor	1	–	1947
Ankaragücü	1	–	1949
Altınordu	–	3	–
Altay	–	2	–
Bahriye	–	1	–
İzmirspor	–	1	–
İzmit Harp Filosu	–	1	–
Galatasaray	–	1	–

== See also ==
- List of Turkish football champions
- Turkish National Division
- Turkish Super League
