= Eskişehir Demirspor =

Turkish sports club

- Full name: Eskişehir Demirspor
- Nickname: Dem-Dem
- Founded: 1930
- Chairman: Sayim Su
- Manager: Orhan Türkmengil
- League: Turkish Regional Amateur League
- 2022-23: Eskişehir Super Amateur League, 1st (promoted)
Home colours	Away colours

Eskişehir Demirspor is a Turkish sports club from Eskişehir, Turkey. They are the oldest football club in Eskişehir. The club has many departments including football, basketball, volleyball, athletic, swimming, fencing, wrestling, and karate. They are famous with their football department and have won the Turkish Football Championship in 1940.

== Honours ==
- Turkish Football Championship

Winners (1): 1940
Third place (2): 1946, 1949

- Eskişehir Football League

Winners (22) (record): 1933-34, 1934-35, 1936-37, 1937-38, 1938-39, 1939-40, 1940-41, 1941-42, 1942-43, 1943-44, 1944-45, 1945-46, 1946-47, 1947-48, 1948-49, 1951-52, 1952-53, 1953-54, 1954-55, 1955-56, 1956-57, 1957-58
