= Ankara 19 May Stadium =

Stadium in Ankara, Turkey

- Ankara 19 Mayıs Stadyumu
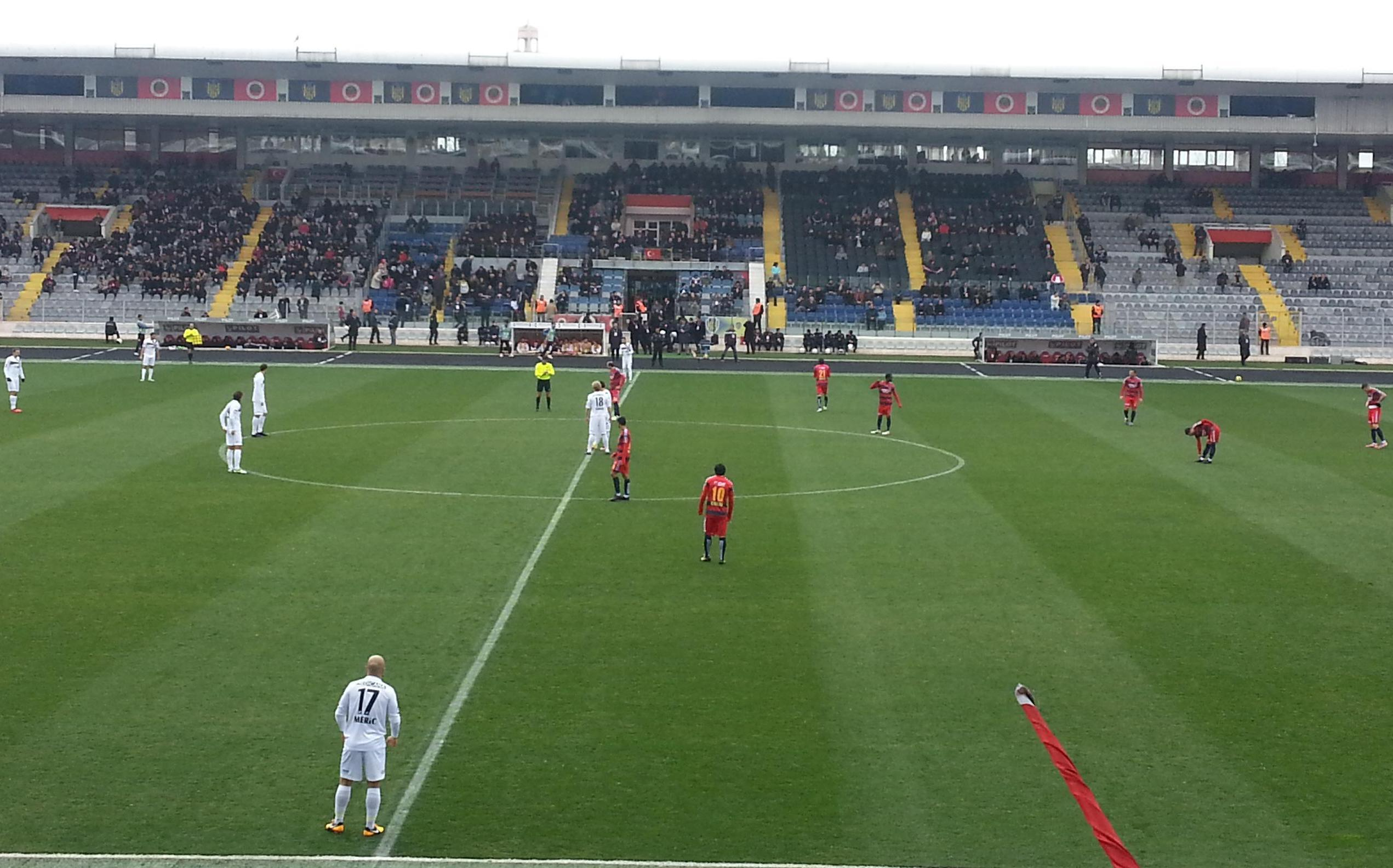
- Interactive map of Ankara 19 May Stadium
- Location: Ankara, Turkey
- Coordinates: 39°56′24″N 32°50′44″E
- Owner: Government of Turkey
- Capacity: 19,219
- Surface: Grass

Construction
- Groundbreaking: 1934
- Built: 1934-1936
- Opened: 1936
- Demolished: 2018
- Rebuilt: 2022-2026
- Architect: J.S.K (arenaCom)

The Ankara 19 May Stadium (Turkish: Ankara 19 Mayıs Stadyumu) was the main stadium of Ankara and was used by Gençlerbirliği and Ankaragücü as their home venue, until its closure in 2018. It was built in 1930 and is part of the 19 Mayıs Sports Complex, which is located in the Ulus district. The stadium had a capacity of 19,209 (all-seater). Ankaraspor also used the stadium until they moved to their new venue in the Yenikent district.

The stadium was named after the date 19 May 1919, when Mustafa Kemal Atatürk arrived at Samsun to start the Turkish War of Independence. Official ceremonies to celebrate the May 19th Youth and Sports Day were also held at the stadium.

In August 2018, demolition of the stadium began in order to make way for a new stadium to be built on the site.

== Original stadium ==
The stadium was originally built from 1934 to 1936, designed by architect Paolo Vietti-Violi.

== Stadium reconstruction project ==
The New Ankara 19 Mayıs Stadium, is a complete reconstruction project by the Ministry of Youth and Sport and the Ankara City Council. The stadium's project was first introduced to the Turkish press on February 4, 2010 but because many problems, delays and changes on project, the construction could only start mid of 2022.

The New Ankara Stadium will be located on the site of the current stadium.

It was planned to be completed by a façade with a structure consisting of geometric patterns inspired by traditional Turkish mosaic art and architecture.

In the newest and chosen project from BKA Architecture, the capacity of the stadium will be 45,000.

== Stands ==
In the stadium there were five stands: Gecekondu, Maraton, Saatli, Kapalı and Protokol. Gecekondu, Maraton and Kapalı were usually used by the home side supporters. Protokol belonged to statesmen and high-level officials from both the home side and the visiting side. Saatli was usually spared for the visiting team's supporters. Gecekondu was the cheapest part of the stadium.

== Access ==
The stadium was situated at a convenient location; minutes away from the historic city centre and railway station on foot, and accessible easily by various highways, as well as two different metro lines (M1 and M4) and several bus and dolmuş routes.

== Matches and tickets ==
There are two types of tickets for the clubs playing in this stadium: seasonal and per match. Single match tickets can be purchased online from the Biletix website.
