= List of Süper Lig top scorers =

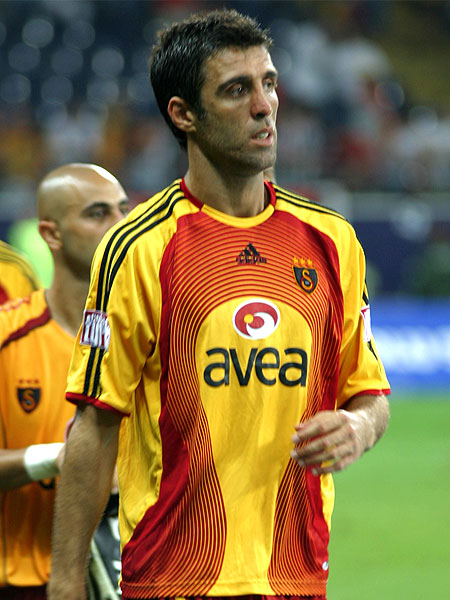
Hakan Şükür has scored the most goals in Süper Lig history.

The Süper Lig top scorers are called Gol Kralı (literally meaning "Goal King" in Turkish) in Turkey. It is the title earned by the top goalscorer in Turkish football league divisions.

The highest number of goals scored in a season was 39, by Tanju Çolak for Galatasaray in 1987–88. Metin Oktay (1962–63) and Hakan Şükür (1996–97) narrowly missed the record; they each scored 38 goals for Galatasaray. Oktay has won the award the most times with six wins in 1959, 1959–60, 1960–61, 1962–63, 1964–65 and 1968–69, which was also his last season. Bosnian Tarik Hodžić was the first non-Turkish winner, when he scored 16 goals for Galatasaray in the 1983–84 season. Oktay (1959, 1960, 1961), Çolak (1986, 1987, 1988) and Şükür (1997, 1998, 1999) are the only players to win the award in three consecutive seasons. Brazilian Alex de Souza is the only foreign player to become top scorer twice; he became top scorer with Fenerbahçe in the 2006–07 and 2010–11 seasons, also winning the Turkish championship title with his club on both occasions. Fenerbahçe are the only club in Süper Lig history to have brought forth the top scorer in four consecutive seasons, from 1991–92 to the 1994–95 season.

Çolak won the European Golden Shoe for his 39 for Galatasaray in 1987–88 and came second with 31 goals in 1990–91. In the 1962–63 season Oktay scored 38 for Galatasaray and became Europe's top scorer. Şükür came third in 1996–97, despite scoring the most goals in Europe.

== All-time top scorers ==
Key

- **Bold** shows players still playing in the Süper Lig.
- Italics show players still playing professional football in other leagues.

As of 9 May 2026

List of Süper Lig players with 100 or more goals
Rank	Player	Goals	Apps	Ratio	First	Last	Club(s) (goals/apps)	Notes
1	(Turkey) Hakan Şükür	249	489	0.51	1987	2008	Sakaryaspor (10/42), Bursaspor (11/54), Galatasaray (228/393)	
2	(Turkey) Tanju Çolak	240	282	0.85	1982	1993	Samsunspor (74/103), Galatasaray (116/125), Fenerbahçe (50/54)	
3	(Turkey) Hami Mandıralı	219	476	0.46	1984	2003	Trabzonspor (218/468), Ankaragücü (1/8)	
4	(Turkey) Metin Oktay	217	258	0.84	1959	1969	Galatasaray	
5	(Turkey) Aykut Kocaman	200	360	0.56	1984	2000	Sakaryaspor (23/68), Fenerbahçe (140/210), İstanbulspor (37/82)	
6	(Turkey) Feyyaz Uçar	191	376	0.51	1982	1996	Beşiktaş (170/321), Fenerbahçe (13/32), Antalyaspor (8/23)	
7	(Turkey) Serkan Aykut	188	336	0.56	1993	2006	Samsunspor (165/289), Galatasaray (23/47)	
8	(Turkey) Burak Yılmaz	187	323	0.58	2006	2020	Beşiktaş (30/79), Manisaspor (9/16), Fenerbahçe (0/6), Trabzonspor (82/103), Eskişehirspor (1/14), Galatasaray (65/105)	
9	(Turkey) Umut Bulut	163	515	0.32	2001	2021	Ankaragücü (36/90), Trabzonspor (67/161), Galatasaray (32/114), Kayserispor (23/102), Yeni Malatyaspor (5/48)	
10	(Turkey) Necati Ateş	138	363	0.38	1997	2015	Altay (2/21), Adanaspor (23/49), Galatasaray (54/109), İstanbul Başakşehir (8/12), Ankaraspor (3/14), Antalyaspor (30/76), Eskişehirspor (16/60), Kayseri Erciyesspor (2/22)	
11	(Turkey) Cenk İşler	137	350	0.39	1995	2011	Samsunspor (33/103), Adanaspor (34/62), İstanbulspor (17/42), Konyaspor (12/30), Ankaragücü (8/15), Kayseri Erciyesspor (27/63), Kasımpaşa (6/26), Bucaspor (0/9)	
12	(Brazil) Alex	136	241	0.56	2004	2013	Fenerbahçe	
12	(Turkey) Ümit Karan	136	359	0.38	1996	2011	Gençlerbirliği (49/137), Galatasaray (71/170), Ankaraspor (5/11), Eskişehirspor (11/41)	
14	(Turkey) Fevzi Zemzem	135	288	0.47	1963	1973	Göztepe	
15	(Turkey) Saffet Sancaklı	130	266	0.49	1987	1998	Beşiktaş (4/25), Eskişehirspor (11/30), Konyaspor (10/24), Sarıyer (0/10), Kocaelispor (53/76), Galatasaray (31/43), Fenerbahçe (21/58)	
15	(Turkey) Fatih Tekke	130	303	0.43	1994	2012	Trabzonspor (88/196), Altay (8/24), Gaziantepspor (28/57), Ankaragücü (3/9), Beşiktaş (0/2), Orduspor (3/15)	
15	(Turkey) Mehmet Özdilek	130	386	0.34	1988	2001	Beşiktaş	
18	(Bosnia and Herzegovina) Elvir Bolić	128	281	0.46	1992	2005	Galatasaray (2/8), Gaziantepspor (43/72), Fenerbahçe (69/146), İstanbulspor (11/28), Yeni Malatyaspor (1/11), Gençlerbirliği (2/16)	
19	(Turkey) Ertuğrul Sağlam	126	328	0.38	1989	2003	Samsunspor (44/161), Beşiktaş (82/167)	
20	(Turkey) Mustafa Denizli	124	401	0.31	1967	1984	Altay (121/386), Galatasaray (3/15)	
21	(Turkey) Oktay Derelioğlu	122	249	0.49	1992	2006	Trabzonspor (15/15), Beşiktaş (73/154), Gaziantepspor (16/20), Fenerbahçe (5/21), Samsunspor (4/17), Akçaabat Sebatspor (9/21), Diyarbakırspor (0/1)	
21	(Turkey) Fikri Elma	122	283	0.43	1959	1969	Ankara Demirspor	
23	(Turkey) Ertan Adatepe	118	264	0.45	1959	1971	Galatasaray (1/7), Ankaragücü (69/137), PTT (48/120)	
24	(Turkey) Cemil Turan	117	309	0.38	1968	1980	İstanbulspor (32/117), Fenerbahçe (85/192)	
25	(Turkey) Halil İbrahim Eren	113	345	0.33	1976	1989	Boluspor (37/107), Ankaragücü (53/123), Gençlerbirliği (16/83), Samsunspor (3/11), Sakaryaspor (4/21)	
26	(Turkey) Osman Arpacıoğlu	112	247	0.45	1965	1977	Hacettepe (0/1), Mersin Talim Yurdu (52/110), Fenerbahçe (60/136)	
27	(Turkey) Márcio Nobre	109	291	0.37	2004	2014	Fenerbahçe (46/80), Beşiktaş (35/127), Mersin Talim Yurdu (23/56), Kayserispor (5/28)	
27	(Turkey) Zafer Tüzün	109	295	0.37	1980	1996	Eskişehirspor (18/76), Fenerbahçe (14/50), Adana Demirspor (11/30), Sakaryaspor (10/26), Bakırköyspor (43/76), Kayseri Erciyesspor (11/27), Denizlispor (2/10)	
29	(Turkey) Cenk Tosun	106	302	0.35	2011	2026	Gaziantepspor (39/109), Beşiktaş (65/165), Fenerbahçe (1/17), Kasımpaşa (1/11)	
30	(Turkey) Sergen Yalçın	105	346	0.3	1991	2006	Beşiktaş (71/229), İstanbulspor (14/36), Fenerbahçe (8/24), Galatasaray (11/36), Trabzonspor (1/21)	
30	(Turkey) Arif Erdem	105	347	0.3	1991	2005	Galatasaray	
32	(Turkey) Gökmen Özdenak	104	313	0.33	1965	1980	İstanbulspor (5/16), Galatasaray (99/297)	
33	(Turkey) Ogün Altıparmak	102	302	0.34	1959	1971	Karşıyaka (35/129), Fenerbahçe (67/173)	
34	(Bosnia and Herzegovina) **Edin Višća**	101	417	0.24	2011	2025	**İstanbul Başakşehir** (85/310), Trabzonspor (16/107)	
35	(Turkey) Gökhan Ünal	100	261	0.38	1999	2015	Gençlerbirliği (3/15), Kayserispor (67/135), Trabzonspor (17/45), Fenerbahçe (2/13), İstanbul Başakşehir (2/11), Karabükspor (4/19), Balıkesirspor (5/23)	

== Top scorers by season ==
The top scorers of the former Turkish Football Championship and National Division are not included in the following list:

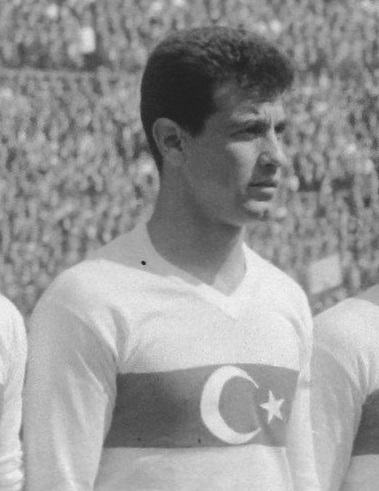
Metin Oktay has won the award a record six times.

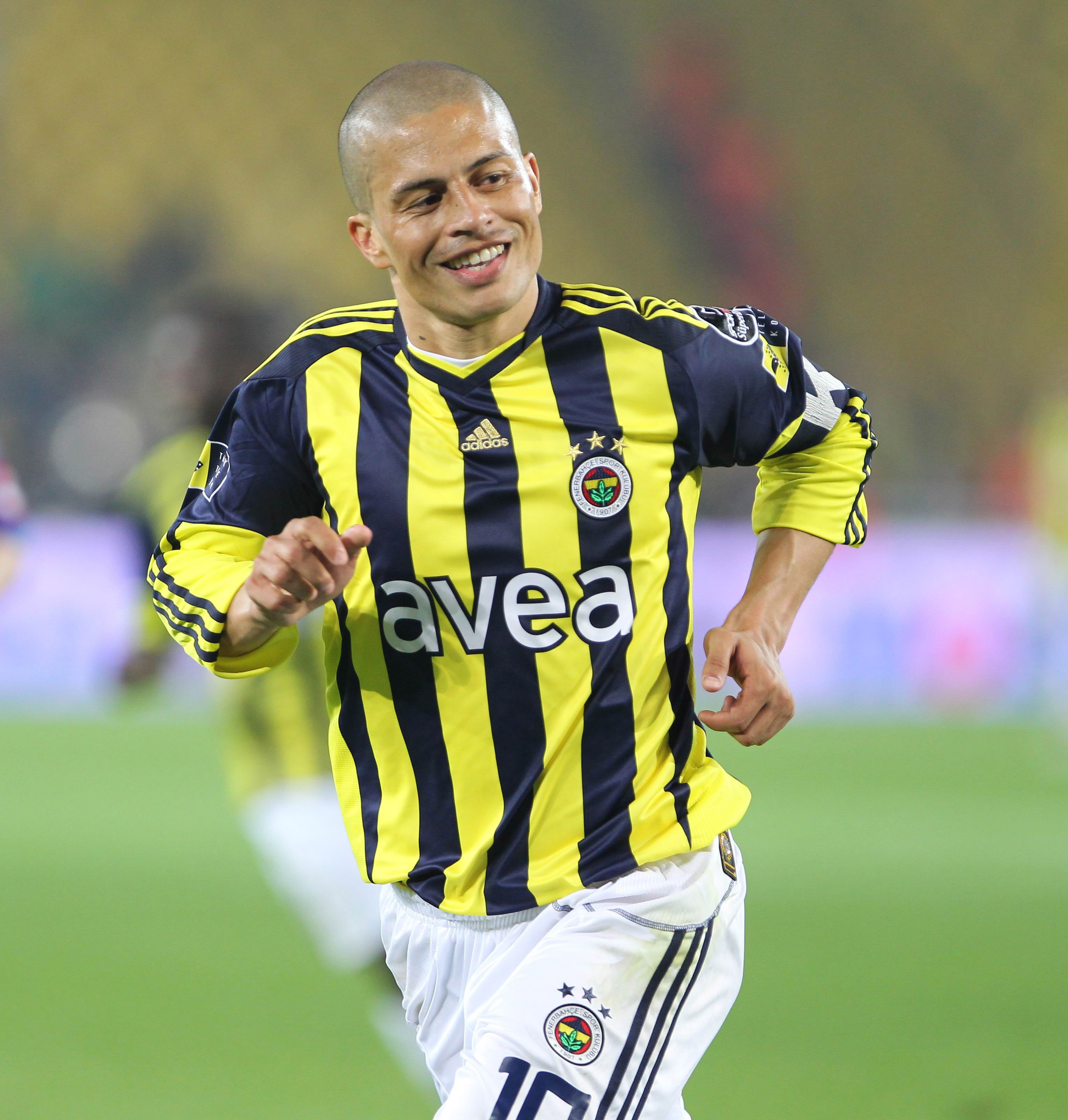
Alex, two time top scorer and most successful foreign player in the history of the league.

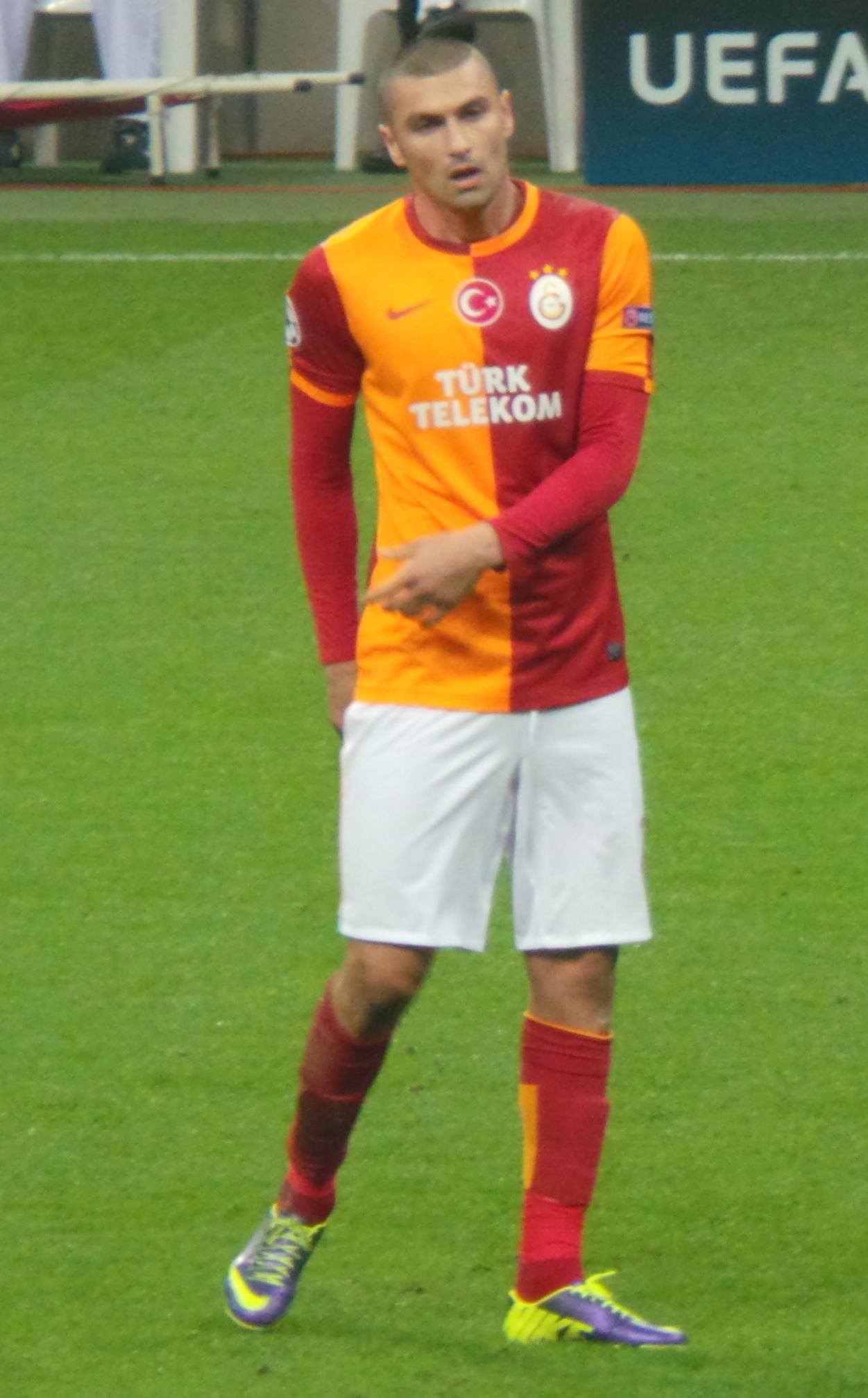
Burak Yılmaz, two time Gol Kralı (2011–12, 2012–13).

Season	Club(s)	Top scorer(s)	Age	Goals	Games	Rate
1959	Galatasaray	(Turkey) Metin Oktay (1)	23	11	15	0.73
1959–60	Galatasaray	(Turkey) Metin Oktay (2)	24	33	33	1
1960–61	Galatasaray	(Turkey) Metin Oktay (3)	25	36	30	1.2
1961–62	Ankara Demirspor	(Turkey) Fikri Elma (1)	28	21	34	0.62
1962–63	**Galatasaray**	(Turkey) Metin Oktay (4)	27	38	26	1.46
1963–64	Beşiktaş	(Turkey) Güven Önüt (1)	24	19	30	0.63
1964–65	Galatasaray	(Turkey) Metin Oktay (5)	29	17	22	0.77
1965–66	Ankaragücü	(Turkey) Ertan Adatepe (1)	28	20	26	0.77
1966–67	Ankaragücü	(Turkey) Ertan Adatepe (2)	29	18	28	0.64
1967–68	Göztepe	(Turkey) Fevzi Zemzem (1)	26	19	30	0.63
1968–69	**Galatasaray**	(Turkey) Metin Oktay (6)	33	17	26	0.65
1969–70	Eskişehirspor	(Turkey) Fethi Heper (1)	26	13	26	0.5
1970–71	Fenerbahçe	(Turkey) Ogün Altıparmak (1)	33	16	26	0.62
1971–72	Eskişehirspor	(Turkey) Fethi Heper (2)	28	20	30	0.67
1972–73	Fenerbahçe	(Turkey) Osman Arpacıoğlu (1)	26	16	19	0.84
1973–74	**Fenerbahçe**	(Turkey) Cemil Turan (1)	27	14	30	0.47
1974–75	Eskişehirspor	(Turkey) Ömer Kaner (1)	24	14	26	0.54
1975–76	Fenerbahçe	(Turkey) Cemil Turan (2)	29	17	30	0.57
1975–76	Ankaragücü	(Turkey) Ali Osman Renklibay (1)	27	17	30	0.57
1976–77	**Trabzonspor**	(Turkey) Necmi Perekli (1)	29	18	22	0.82
1977–78	**Fenerbahçe**	(Turkey) Cemil Turan (3)	31	17	30	0.57
1978–79	Adanaspor	(Turkey) Özer Umdu (1)	27	15	26	0.58
1979–80	Altay	(Turkey) Mustafa Denizli (1)	30	12	30	0.4
1979–80	Bursaspor	(Turkey) Bahtiyar Yorulmaz (1)	24	12	30	0.4
1980–81	Adanaspor	(Turkey) Bora Öztürk (1)	26	15	26	0.58
1981–82	Fenerbahçe	(Turkey) Selçuk Yula (1)	23	16	28	0.57
1982–83	**Fenerbahçe**	(Turkey) Selçuk Yula (2)	24	19	30	0.63
1983–84	Galatasaray	(Socialist Federal Republic of Yugoslavia) Tarik Hodžić (1)	31	16	30	0.53
1984–85	Sakaryaspor	(Turkey) Aykut Yiğit (1)	25	20	34	0.59
1985–86	Samsunspor	(Turkey) Tanju Çolak (1)	22	33	34	0.97
1986–87	Samsunspor	(Turkey) Tanju Çolak (2)	23	25	34	0.74
1987–88	**Galatasaray**	(Turkey) Tanju Çolak (3)	24	39	37	1.05
1988–89	**Fenerbahçe**	(Turkey) Aykut Kocaman (1)	24	29	34	0.85
1989–90	**Beşiktaş**	(Turkey) Feyyaz Uçar (1)	26	28	33	0.85
1990–91	Galatasaray	(Turkey) Tanju Çolak (4)	27	31	29	1.07
1991–92	Fenerbahçe	(Turkey) Aykut Kocaman (2)	27	25	25	1
1992–93	Fenerbahçe	(Turkey) Tanju Çolak (5)	29	27	23	1.17
1993–94	Fenerbahçe	(Turkey) Bülent Uygun (1)	22	22	27	0.81
1994–95	Fenerbahçe	(Turkey) Aykut Kocaman (3)	30	27	25	1.08
1995–96	Trabzonspor	(Georgia (country)) Shota Arveladze (1)	23	25	30	0.83
1996–97	**Galatasaray**	(Turkey) Hakan Şükür (1)	26	38	33	1.15
1997–98	**Galatasaray**	(Turkey) Hakan Şükür (2)	27	33	32	1.03
1998–99	**Galatasaray**	(Turkey) Hakan Şükür (3)	28	19	33	0.58
1999–2000	Samsunspor	(Turkey) Serkan Aykut (1)	25	30	33	0.91
2000–01	Bursaspor	(Turkey) Okan Yılmaz (1)	23	23	31	0.74
2001–02	**Galatasaray**	(Turkey) Arif Erdem (1)	30	21	32	0.66
2001–02	Beşiktaş	(Turkey) İlhan Mansız (1)	26	21	30	0.7
2002–03	Bursaspor	(Turkey) Okan Yılmaz (2)	25	24	34	0.71
2003–04	Konyaspor	(Turkey) Zafer Biryol (1)	27	25	33	0.76
2004–05	Trabzonspor	(Turkey) Fatih Tekke (1)	27	31	34	0.91
2005–06	Kayserispor	(Turkey) Gökhan Ünal (1)	23	25	32	0.78
2006–07	**Fenerbahçe**	(Brazil) Alex (1)	29	19	32	0.59
2007–08	Fenerbahçe	(Turkey) Semih Şentürk (1)	25	17	27	0.63
2008–09	Galatasaray	(Czech Republic) Milan Baroš (1)	27	20	31	0.65
2009–10	Kayserispor	(Portugal) Ariza Makukula (1)	29	21	29	0.72
2010–11	**Fenerbahçe**	(Brazil) Alex (2)	33	28	33	0.85
2011–12	Trabzonspor	(Turkey) Burak Yılmaz (1)	26	33	34	0.97
2012–13	**Galatasaray**	(Turkey) Burak Yılmaz (2)	27	24	30	0.8
2013–14	Sivasspor	(Morocco) Aatif Chahechouhe (1)	27	17	34	0.5
2014–15	Bursaspor	(Brazil) Fernandão (1)	28	22	30	0.73
2015–16	**Beşiktaş**	(Germany) Mario Gómez (1)	30	26	33	0.79
2016–17	Alanyaspor	(Brazil) Vágner Love (1)	32	23	28	0.82
2017–18	**Galatasaray**	(France) Bafétimbi Gomis (1)	32	29	33	0.88
2018–19	Kasımpaşa	(Senegal) Mbaye Diagne (1)	27	30	29	1.03
2018–19	**Galatasaray**	(Senegal) Mbaye Diagne (1)	27	30	29	1.03
2019–20	Trabzonspor	(Norway) Alexander Sørloth (1)	24	24	34	0.71
2020–21	Hatayspor	(Gabon) Aaron Boupendza (1)	24	22	36	0.61
2021–22	Kasımpaşa	(Turkey) Umut Bozok (1)	25	20	38	0.53
2022–23	Fenerbahçe	(Ecuador) Enner Valencia (1)	33	29	31	0.94
2023–24	**Galatasaray**	(Argentina) Mauro Icardi (1)	31	25	34	0.74
2024–25	**Galatasaray**	(Nigeria) Victor Osimhen (1)	26	26	30	0.87
2025–26	Trabzonspor	(Nigeria) Paul Onuachu (1)	31	22	30	0.73
2025–26	İstanbul Başakşehir	(Uzbekistan) Eldor Shomurodov (1)	30	22	34	0.65

- Teams in **bold** were the champions of the mentioned season.

=== Statistics ===
==== By player ====
Rank	Player	Country	Titles	Seasons
1	Metin Oktay	Turkey	6	1959, 1960, 1961, 1963, 1965, 1969
2	Tanju Çolak	Turkey	5	1986, 1987, 1988, 1991, 1993
3	Cemil Turan	Turkey	3	1974, 1976, 1978
3	Aykut Kocaman	Turkey	3	1989, 1992, 1995
3	Hakan Şükür	Turkey	3	1997, 1998, 1999
6	Ertan Adatepe	Turkey	2	1966, 1967
6	Fethi Heper	Turkey	2	1970, 1972
6	Selçuk Yula	Turkey	2	1982, 1983
6	Okan Yılmaz	Turkey	2	2001, 2003
6	Alex	Brazil	2	2007, 2011
6	Burak Yılmaz	Turkey	2	2012, 2013
12	Fikri Elma	Turkey	1	1962
12	Güven Önüt	Turkey	1	1964
12	Fevzi Zemzem	Turkey	1	1968
12	Ogün Altıparmak	Turkey	1	1971
12	Osman Arpacıoğlu	Turkey	1	1973
12	Ömer Kaner	Turkey	1	1975
12	Ali Osman Renklibay	Turkey	1	1976
12	Necmi Perekli	Turkey	1	1977
12	Özer Umdu	Turkey	1	1979
12	Mustafa Denizli	Turkey	1	1980
12	Bahtiyar Yorulmaz	Turkey	1	1980
12	Bora Öztürk	Turkey	1	1981
12	Tarik Hodžić	Yugoslavia	1	1984
12	Aykut Yiğit	Turkey	1	1985
12	Feyyaz Uçar	Turkey	1	1990
12	Bülent Uygun	Turkey	1	1994
12	Shota Arveladze	Georgia	1	1996
12	Serkan Aykut	Turkey	1	2000
12	Arif Erdem	Turkey	1	2002
12	İlhan Mansız	Turkey	1	2002
12	Zafer Biryol	Turkey	1	2004
12	Fatih Tekke	Turkey	1	2005
12	Gökhan Ünal	Turkey	1	2006
12	Semih Şentürk	Turkey	1	2008
12	Milan Baroš	Czech Republic	1	2009
12	Ariza Makukula	Portugal	1	2010
12	Aatif Chahechouhe	Morocco	1	2014
12	Fernandão	Brazil	1	2015
12	Mario Gómez	Germany	1	2016
12	Vágner Love	Brazil	1	2017
12	Bafétimbi Gomis	France	1	2018
12	Mbaye Diagne	Senegal	1	2019
12	Alexander Sørloth	Norway	1	2020
12	Aaron Boupendza	Gabon	1	2021
12	Umut Bozok	Turkey	1	2022
12	Enner Valencia	Ecuador	1	2023
12	Mauro Icardi	Argentina	1	2024
12	Victor Osimhen	Nigeria	1	2025
12	Paul Onuachu	Nigeria	1	2026
12	Eldor Shomurodov	Uzbekistan	1	2026

==== By club ====
Rank	Club	Titles	Seasons
1	Galatasaray	19	1959, 1960, 1961, 1963, 1965, 1969, 1984, 1988, 1991, 1997, 1998, 1999, 2002, 2009, 2013, 2018, 2019, 2024, 2025
2	Fenerbahçe	16	1971, 1973, 1974, 1976, 1978, 1982, 1983, 1989, 1992, 1993, 1994, 1995, 2007, 2008, 2011, 2023
3	Trabzonspor	6	1977, 1996, 2005, 2012, 2020, 2026
4	Bursaspor	4	1980, 2001, 2003, 2015
4	Beşiktaş	4	1964, 1990, 2002, 2016
6	Eskişehirspor	3	1970, 1972, 1975
6	MKE Ankaragücü	3	1966, 1967, 1976
6	Samsunspor	3	1986, 1987, 2000
9	Adanaspor	2	1979, 1981
9	Kayserispor	2	2006, 2010
9	Kasımpaşa	2	2019, 2022
12	Ankara Demirspor	1	1962
12	Göztepe	1	1968
12	Altay	1	1980
12	Sakaryaspor	1	1985
12	Konyaspor	1	2004
12	Sivasspor	1	2014
12	Alanyaspor	1	2017
12	Hatayspor	1	2021
12	İstanbul Başakşehir	1	2026

==== By country ====
Country	Titles
Turkey	53
Brazil	4
Nigeria	2
Argentina	1
Czech Republic	1
Ecuador	1
France	1
Gabon	1
Georgia	1
Germany	1
Morocco	1
Norway	1
Portugal	1
Senegal	1
Uzbekistan	1
Yugoslavia	1

== Records ==
- Most goals in a season: 39
  - Tanju Çolak (Galatasaray) 1987–88
- Highest scoring average: 1.461 Goals per match
  - Metin Oktay (Galatasaray) 1962–63 (38 goals in 26 matches)
- Most consecutive wins: 3
  - Metin Oktay (1959, 1960, 1961)
  - Tanju Çolak (1986, 1987, 1988)
  - Hakan Şükür (1997, 1998, 1999)
- Most consecutive club wins: 4
  - Fenerbahçe (1992, 1993, 1994, 1995)
- Youngest topscorers:
  - Tanju Çolak (1985–86, 22 years 203 days)
  - Selçuk Yula (1981–82, 22 years 216 days)
  - Okan Yılmaz (2000–01, 23 years 4 days)
  - Metin Oktay (1959, 23 years 124 days)
- Oldest topscorers:
  - Alex (2010–11, 33 years 250 days)
  - Enner Valencia (2022–23, 33 years 215 days)
  - Metin Oktay (1968–69, 33 years 112 days)
  - Vágner Love (2016–17, 32 years 352 days)
  - Bafétimbi Gomis (2017–18, 32 years 286 days)
  - Ogün Altıparmak (1970–71, 32 years 208 days)
  - Tarık Hodzic (1983–84, 32 years 177 days)

== See also ==
- Capocannoniere
- Premier League Golden Boot
- Pichichi Trophy
- List of Bundesliga top scorers
- Bola de Prata (Portugal)
- European Golden Shoe
- List of Turkish football champions
- Football records in Turkey
