= Big Three (Turkey) =

Colloquial name given to three Turkish sports clubs

Locations of Big Three in Istanbul

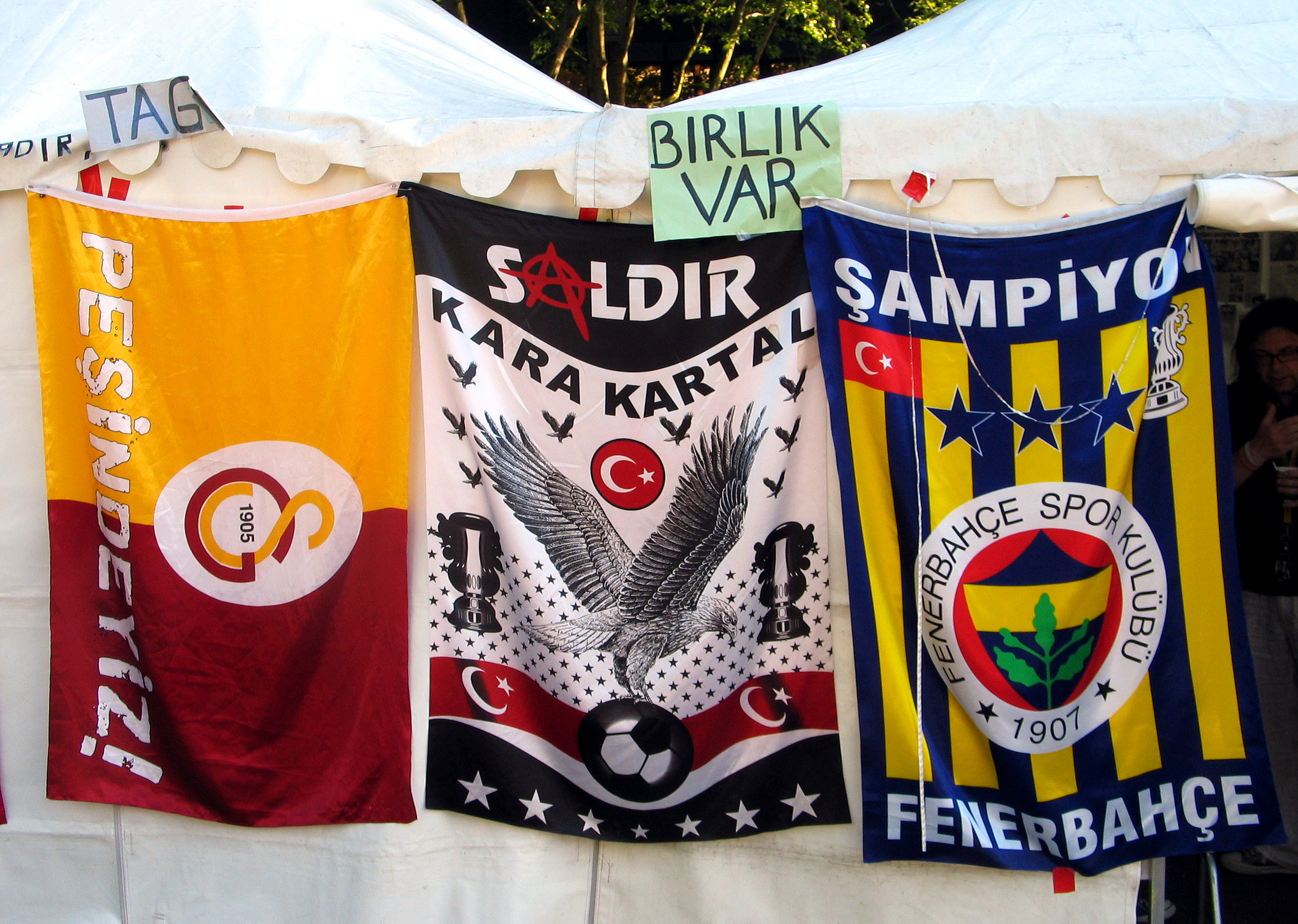
Flags of the 'Big Three' in Gezi Park protests.

The Big Three (Turkish: Üç Büyükler) is the colloquial name given to Beşiktaş, Galatasaray and Fenerbahçe, the three most successful sports clubs in Turkey. They are all based in Istanbul.

Galatasaray is the team with the most championships with 26. Fenerbahçe have won 19 championships and Beşiktaş have won 16 Turkish championships. None of the trio have been relegated since 1959. The worst places the side have finished in league history were 10th for Fenerbahçe in 1980–81, 11th for Beşiktaş in 1975–76, and 13th for Galatasaray in 2021–22.

During the late 1970s and the beginning of the 1980s, Trabzonspor won six times the Turkish league throughout nine seasons. In that period, the "Big Three" were expanded to a Big Four, with the Trabzon club among the Istanbul trio.

Nevertheless, due to Trabzonspor long lack of league titles between 1984 and 2022, the so-called "Big Four" gradually became again the Big Three. They all started to compete in Europe after the 1950s. Galatasaray is only Turkish team to have won a European trophy, having won both the UEFA Cup and UEFA Super Cup in 2000.

A reported 90% of the fans in Turkey support the Big Three. A survey by a fan-token platform showed support for Galatasaray in 65 out of 81 provinces of Turkey while its crosstown rival Fenerbahçe had the highest number of fans in 18 provinces, and Beşiktaş, the other member of Turkish football's "Big Three", had more fans than other clubs only in the eastern province of Iğdır. According to the survey, 40% of the fans support Galatasaray, 35% support Fenerbahçe and 20% support Beşiktaş.

== The three-way rivalry ==
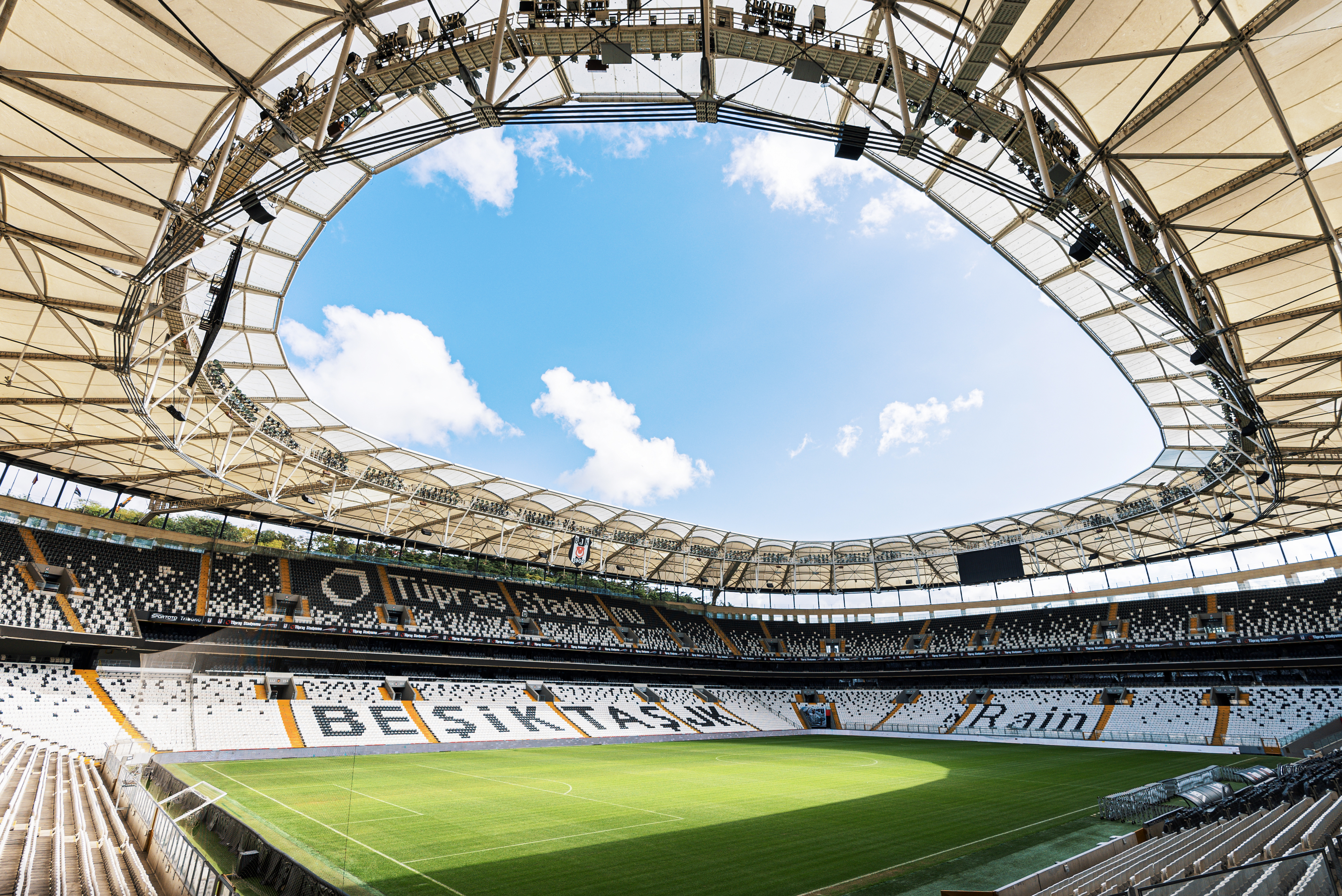
Beşiktaş Stadium

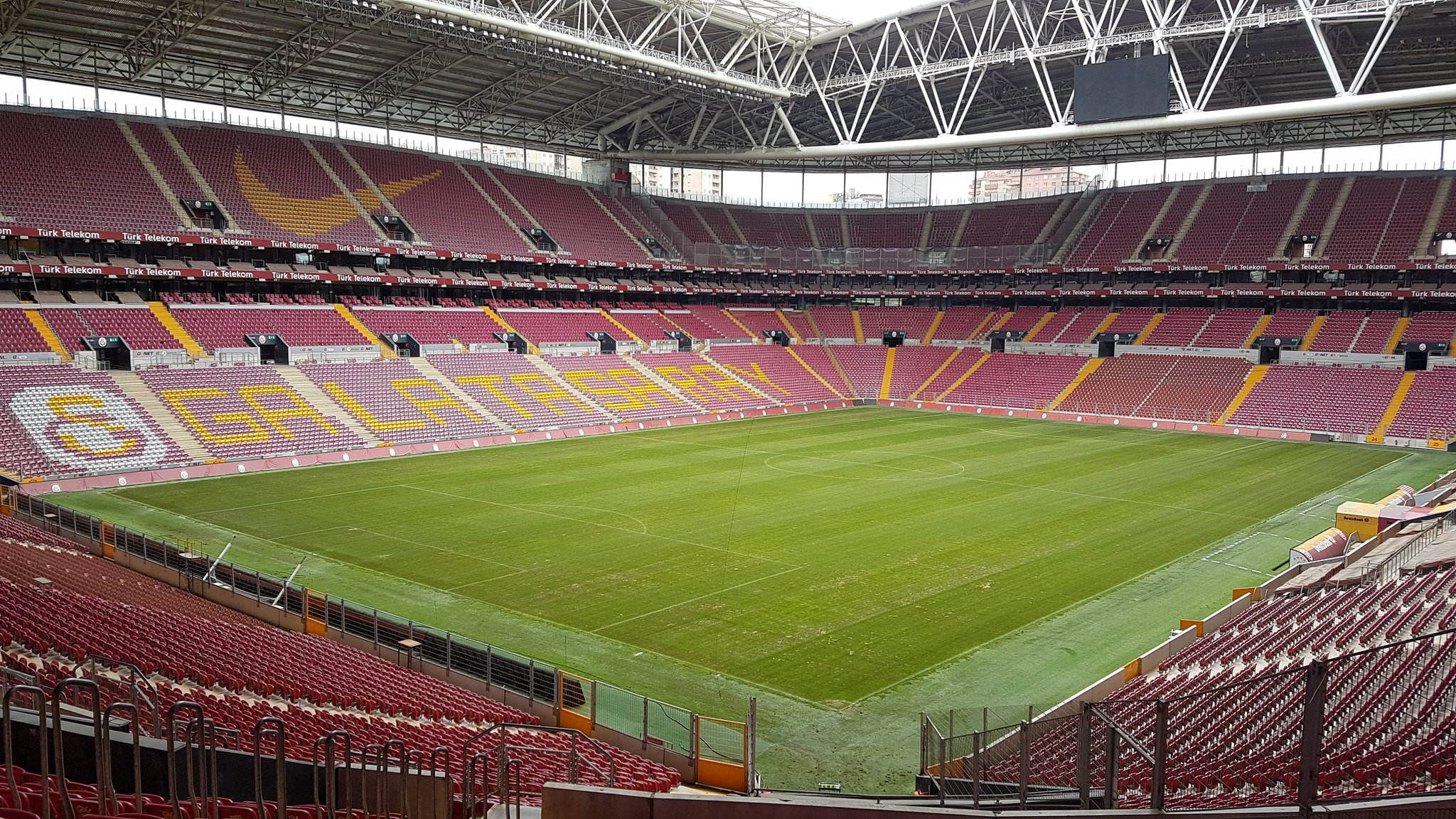
Rams Park

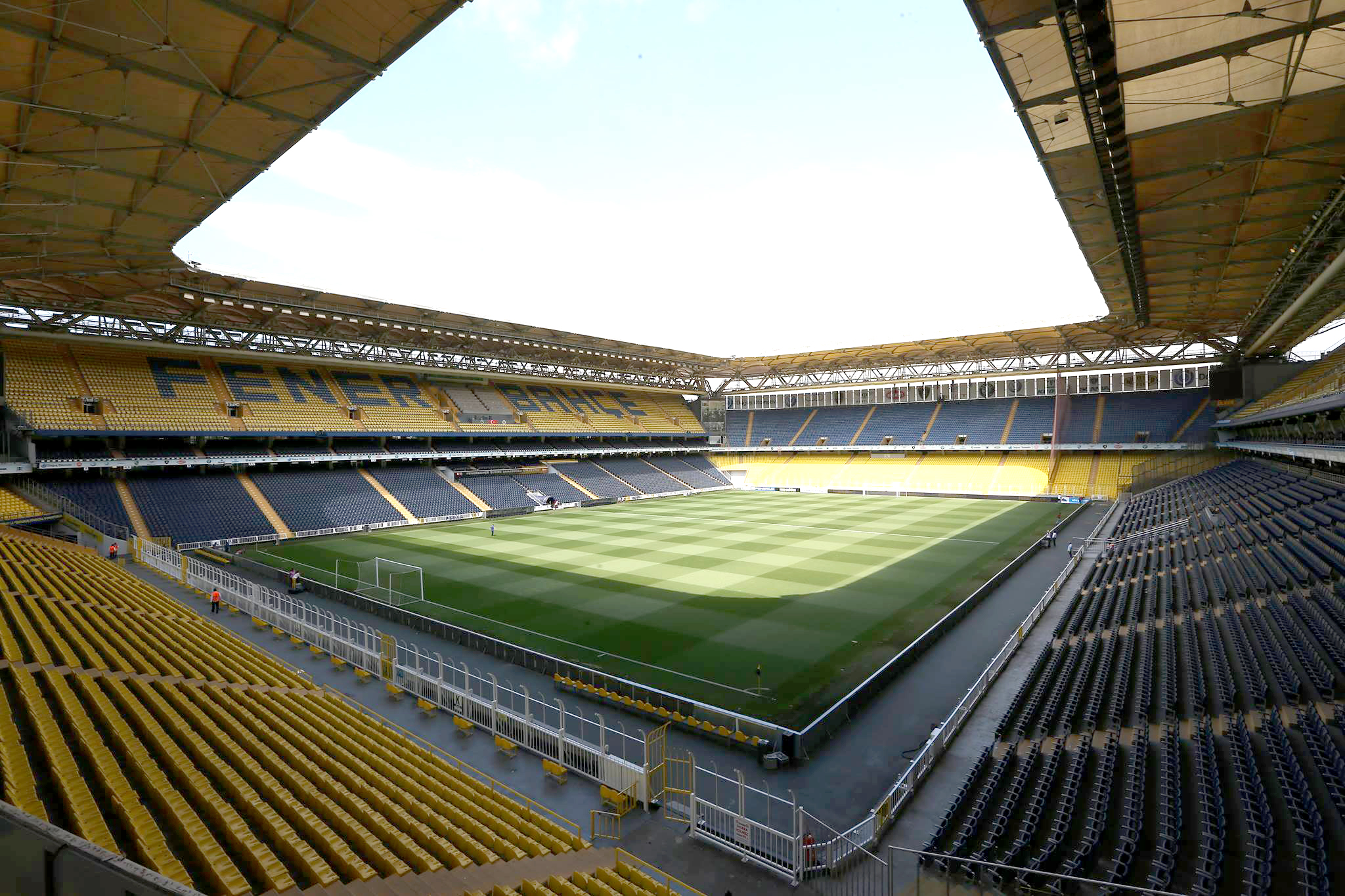
Şükrü Saracoğlu Stadium

As of 7 March 2026

=== Fenerbahçe vs. Galatasaray ===
Team	Pl	W	D	L	GF	GA
Fenerbahçe	405	150	125	130	546	505
Galatasaray	405	130	125	150	505	546

=== Fenerbahçe vs. Beşiktaş ===
Team	Pld	W	D	L	GF	GA
Fenerbahçe	366	138	97	131	507	466
Beşiktaş	363	130	97	136	463	503

=== Beşiktaş vs. Galatasaray ===
Team	Pld	W	D	L	GF	GA
Galatasaray	360	129	115	116	501	473
Beşiktaş	360	116	115	129	473	501

== Statistics ==
=== League placements ===
Club	1st	2nd	3rd	4th	5th	6th	7th	8th	9th	10th	11th	12th	13th	Total	Top 3
Galatasaray	26	11	16	3	4	3		2	1		1		1	68	53
Fenerbahçe	19	27	8	5	4	2	1	1		1				68	54
Beşiktaş	16	14	15	11	5	5			2		2			68	43

=== Head-to-head ranking in Süper Lig ===
P.	59	60	61	62	63	64	65	66	67	68	69	70	71	72	73	74	75	76	77	78	79	80	81	82	83	84	85	86	87	88	89	90	91	92	93	94	95	96	97	98	99	00	01	02	03	04	05	06	07	08	09	10	11	12	13	14	15	16	17	18	19	20	21	22	23	24	25	26
1	1	1	1	1	1	1	1	1	1	1	1	1	1	1	1	1	1			1				1	1		1	1	1	1	1	1	1	1	1	1	1	1	1	1	1	1	1	1	1	1	1	1	1	1	1		1	1	1	1	1	1	1	1	1		1		1	1	1	1
2	2	2	2	2	2	2	2	2	2	2			2		2	2	2	2	2		2	2				2	2	2	2	2	2	2	2	2	2	2			2	2	2	2	2	2	2			2	2	2		2		2	2	2	2	2		2			2	2	2	2	2	2
3	3	3	3	3	3	3	3		3	3	3			3				3		3	3		3	3	3	3					3			3			3	3	3		3			3		3	3	3	3	3		3			3	3	3		3		3	3	3		3			
4								4			4			4					4							4						4				4	4	4				4	4				4				4	4		4					4	4							4	4
5																5	5		5	5			5		5		5	5	5				5		5																5		5															
6													6		6																									6					6	6												6			6	6		6		6		
7																																																														7						
8												8																		8																							8															
9												9									9	9																																														
10																							10																																													
11																		11				11		11																																												
12																																																																				
13																																																																13				
14																																																																				
15																																																																				
16																																																																				
17																																																																				
18																																																																				
19																																																																				
20																																																																				
21																																																																				
22																																																																				

• Total: Galatasaray with 28 higher finishes, Fenerbahçe with 25 higher finishes, Beşiktaş with 15 higher finishes (as of the end of the 2025–26 season).

== Honours comparison ==
As of 17 May 2026

- Numbers with this background indicate the record in the competition.

Organization	Galatasaray	Fenerbahçe	Beşiktaş
National
Süper Lig	26	19	16
Turkish Cup	19	7	11
Turkish Super Cup	17	10	10
Turkish Football Championship	—	3	2
Turkish National Division	1	6	3
Prime Minister's Cup	5	8	6
Spor Toto Cup	—	1	3
Atatürk Cup	—	1	1
50th Anniversary Cup	1	—	—
Aggregate	68	55	52
Local
Istanbul Football League	15	16	13
Istanbul Football Cup	2	1	2
Aggregate	17	17	15
Europe
UEFA Super Cup	1	-	—
UEFA Europa League	1	-	—
Aggregate	2	—	—
Total	88	72	67

Note: Calculated based on official tournaments. Preparatory and special tournaments are not included.

== European competitions ==
=== Honours ===
As of 10 March 2026

Club	UEFA Super Cup	European Cup / UEFA Champions League		UEFA Cup / Europa League			UEFA Europa Conference League / Conference League	UEFA Cup Winners' Cup
Club	Winner	Semi-finalist	Quarter-finalist	Winner	Semi-finalist	Quarter-finalist	Quarter-finalist	Quarter-finalist
Galatasaray	2000	1989	1963, 1970, 1994, 2001, 2013	2000	-	-	-	1992
Fenerbahçe	-	-	2008	-	2013	-	2024	1964
Beşiktaş	-	-	1987	-	-	2003, 2017	-	-

=== Standings ===
Ranking	Club	Pld	W	D	L	GF	GA	Pts	GD
1	Galatasaray	339	121	90	128	468	514	453	−46
2	Fenerbahçe	300	118	65	117	409	423	419	−14
3	Beşiktaş	258	97	50	111	348	395	341	−47

=== UEFA 5-year Club Ranking of the Big Three ===
Ranking	Team	21/22	22/23	23/24	24/25	25/26	Total Points
40	Fenerbahçe	5.00	17.00	14.00	11.25	10.50	57.75
47	Galatasaray	15.00	-	8.00	12.75	17.75	53.50
123	Beşiktaş	4.00	-	3.00	6.00	2.50	15.50

== Players who have played for the three clubs ==
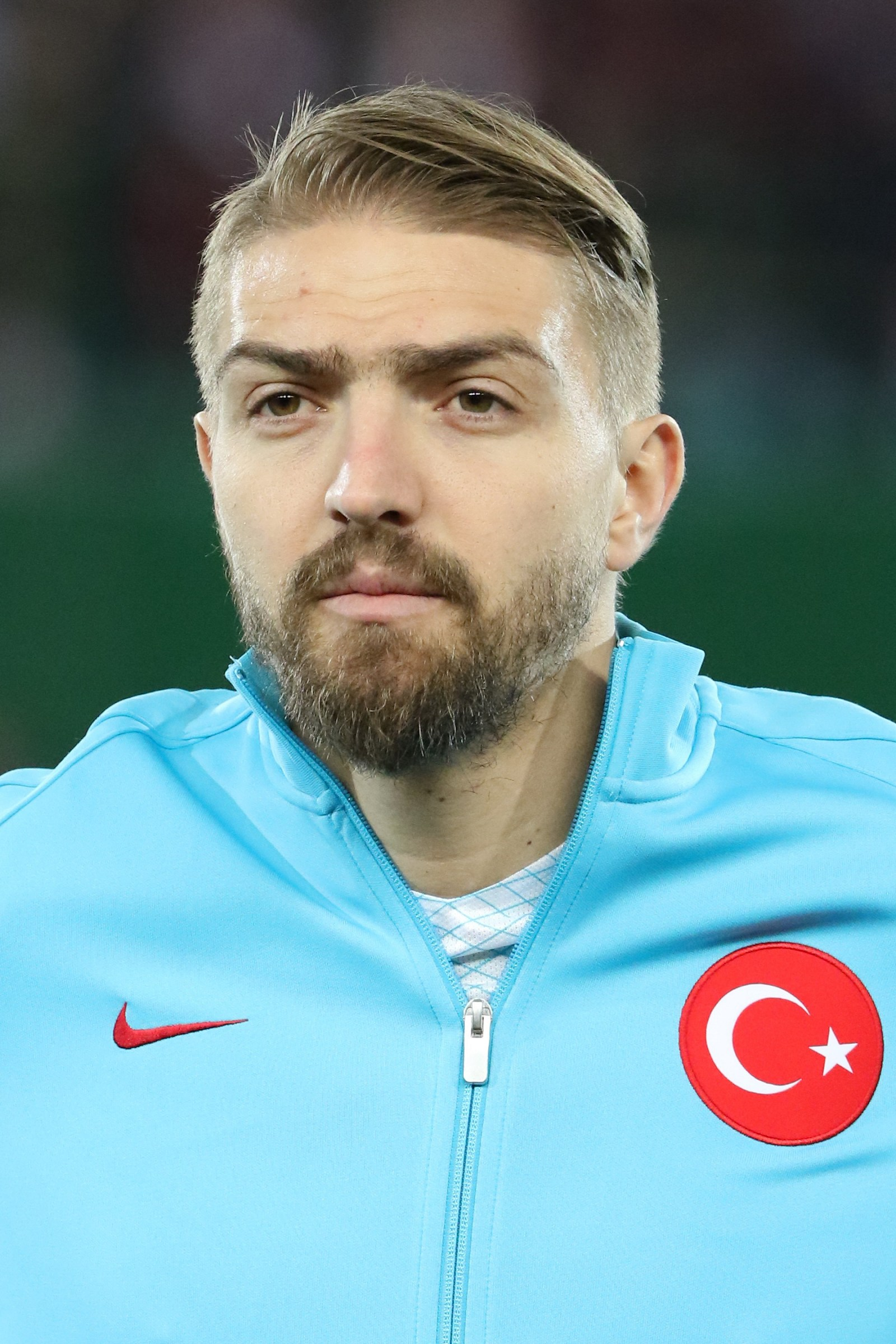
Caner Erkin

- (Turkey) Refik Osman Top (Beşiktaş 1912–1913, 1923–1924, Fenerbahçe 1913–1915 and 1923, Galatasaray 1915–1917, 1921–1922, 1923 and 1924)
- (Turkey) Ali Soydan (Galatasaray 1951–1957, Fenerbahçe 1959–1960, Beşiktaş 1963–1964)
- (Turkey) Saffet Sancaklı (Beşiktaş 1987–1991, Galatasaray 1994–1995, Fenerbahçe 1996–1998)
- (Turkey) Sergen Yalçın (Beşiktaş 1991–1997 and 2002–2006, Fenerbahçe 1999–2000, Galatasaray 2000 and 2001–02)
- (Turkey) Ahmet Yıldırım (Fenerbahçe 1993–1994, Galatasaray 1999–2001, Beşiktaş 2001–2005)
- (Turkey) Emre Aşık (Fenerbahçe 1993–1996, Galatasaray 2000–2003 and 2006–2010, Beşiktaş 2003–2006)
- (Turkey) Mehmet Yozgatlı (Galatasaray 1999–2000, Fenerbahçe 2004–2007, Beşiktaş 2007–2008)
- (Turkey) Burak Yılmaz (Beşiktaş 2006–2008 and 2019–2020, Fenerbahçe 2008–2010, Galatasaray 2012–2016)
- (Turkey) Caner Erkin (Galatasaray 2009–2010, Fenerbahçe 2010–2016 and 2020–2021, Beşiktaş 2016–2020)
- (Turkey) Mehmet Topal (Galatasaray 2006–2010, Fenerbahçe 2012–2019, Beşiktaş 2021–2022)
- (Belgium) Michy Batshuayi (Beşiktaş 2021–2022, Fenerbahçe 2022–2024, Galatasaray 2024-2025)
- (Turkey) Yağmur Uraz (Beşiktas 2018–2022, Galatasaray 2022–2023, Fenerbahçe 2023–)

Uraz is the first woman to play for all three clubs.

Yalçın and Yılmaz did also had play for Trabzonspor, a club seen as big as the trio in the 1970s and 1980s.

== Managers who have managed the three clubs ==
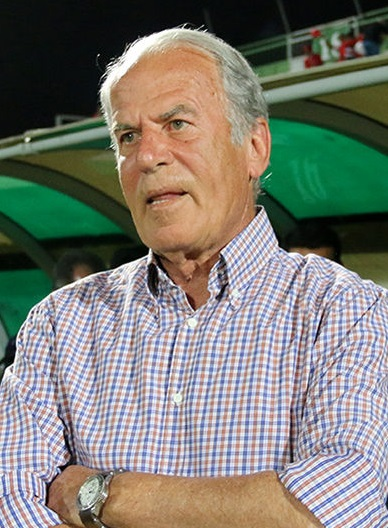
Former Turkish international footballer and current manager Mustafa Denizli is the only manager who won Süper Lig titles with Big Three.

- (Turkey) Mustafa Denizli (Galatasaray 1987–1989, 1990–1992, 2015–2016, Fenerbahçe 2000–2002, Beşiktaş 2008–2010)

== See also ==
- Big Three (Belgium)
- Big Three (Costa Rica)
- Big Three (Greece)
- Big Three (Italy)
- Big Three (Netherlands)
- Big Three (Peru)
- Big Three (Portugal)
- Big Three (Spain)
- Big Three (Sweden)
- Big Four (Mexico)
- Big Five (Argentina)
- Big Six (Premier League)
- Big Twelve (Brazil)
