= Mustafa Denizli =

Turkish footballer and coach

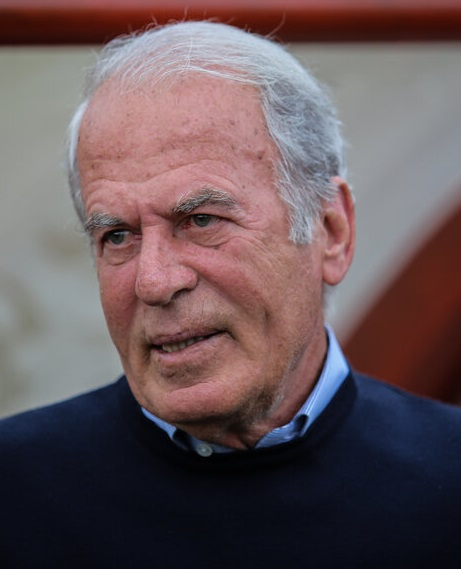
- Denizli in 2019

Personal information
- Date of birth: 10 November 1949 (age 76)
- Place of birth: Çeşme, Turkey
- Height: 1.78 m (5 ft 10 in)
- Position: Striker

Senior career*
Years	Team	Apps	(Gls)
1966–1983	Altay	386	(121)
1983–1984	Galatasaray	15	(3)
Total		401	(124)

International career
1971–1980	Turkey	10	(2)

Managerial career
- 1987–1989: Galatasaray
- 1989–1990: Alemannia Aachen
- 1990–1992: Galatasaray
- 1994–1996: Kocaelispor
- 1996–2000: Turkey
- 2000–2002: Fenerbahçe
- 2003–2004: Manisaspor
- 2004–2006: Pas Tehran
- 2006–2007: Persepolis
- 2008–2010: Beşiktaş
- 2011–2012: Persepolis
- 2012–2013: Çaykur Rizespor
- 2013–2014: Khazar Lankaran
- 2015–2016: Galatasaray
- 2017: Eskişehirspor
- 2018–2019: Kasımpaşa
- 2019: Tractor
- 2021–2022: Altay
- * Club domestic league appearances and goals

Mustafa Denizli (born 10 November 1949) is a Turkish football coach and former player. He has managed many notable Turkish football clubs, including "Istanbul Big Three" (Fenerbahçe, Galatasaray and Beşiktaş) and has won the Süper Lig title three times. He is the only manager in history to win the Süper Lig with three clubs, and the only manager who reached semi-finals in the European Cup 1988-89 - which make him one the top 3 coaches of Turkey along with Fatih Terim and Şenol Güneş.

== Managerial career ==
=== Early years ===
Denizli was appointed manager of FK Khazar Lankaran on 3 December 2013, with a one-and-a-half-year deal. On 16 May 2014, Denizli terminated his contract with Khazar.

He also has worked outside Turkey with Alemannia Aachen in Germany, Pas and Persepolis in Iran and Khazar Lankaran in Azerbaijan. He managed the Turkey national team for four years and reached the quarter-finals of Euro 2000. On 23 December 2011, he returned to Persepolis but resigned at the end of the season. He spent 17 years with his hometown club Altay in İzmir, gaining a reputation as one of the best players in the position of attacking left forward in the league's history. On 9 October 2008 he signed a 1-year contract with Beşiktaş. On 30 May the club claimed its 13th Süper Lig title under his guidance. Denizli is the only one in Turkey who have won the national league with the ""three biggest"" football clubs; Beşiktaş, Fenerbahçe and Galatasaray as a manager. With 2008–09 league title, Denizli also clings to the achievement of being "the one and only Turkish coach Beşiktaş earned the league title with". 2 June 2010 According to a number of reports from Turkey, experienced gaffer Denizli has resigned as head coach of Süper Lig titans Beşiktaş for medical reasons.

=== Third term at Galatasaray ===
On 19 November 2015, Galatasaray manager Hamza Hamzaoğlu left his position as a result of mutual agreement. On 22 November 2015, Denizli said "Galatasaray's president called me. I am going to meet with him tomorrow, negotiating for managerial position" on TRT Spor broadcast. A day later, Galatasaray's president Dursun Aydın Özbek met with Denizli at Point Hotel Beşiktaş, Istanbul and he said "I offered managerial position to Mustafa Denizli and he accepted in principle. We will sign the official contract in a few days" on the press conference. Denizli commented "I started my career's unforgettable success' here and I want close the parenthesis here."

Before the signing, Denizli followed UEFA Champions League match, Galatasaray played with Atlético Madrid in Vicente Calderón Stadium. But in this match, the team was managed by Cláudio Taffarel as the interim manager. On 26 November 2015, he signed a contract until June 2017 in Florya Metin Oktay Sports Complex and Training Center.

Denizli started his third term at Galatasaray with a 2–2 draw against Kasımpaşa in Süper Lig. Team was beat Bursaspor with 3-0 in Ali Sami Yen Sports Complex, which is his second match. On 8 December 2015, team draw against 1-1 with FC Astana but they took third place in UEFA Champions League C Group and qualified for 2015–16 UEFA Europa League knockout phase. He said "This was the hardest 90 minutes of my career." after the game. His last European match in 1991–92 European Cup Winners' Cup with Werder Bremen while he was a coach of Galatasaray until this match.

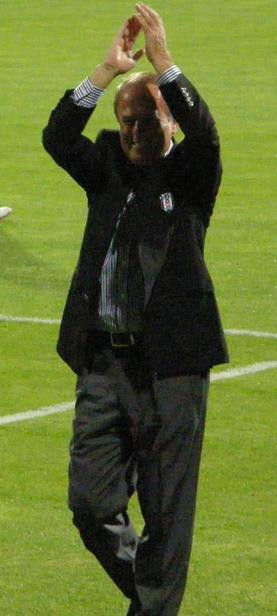
Denizli as manager of Beşiktaş in 2010

His first derby was with Beşiktaş in Atatürk Olympic Stadium and Galatasaray lost 2–1 this match. Besides, this was first defeat of Denizli on third term. After this, Galatasaray was met with Akhisar Belediyespor, impending Turkish Cup and beat in two matches. Denizli went outside Istanbul with Kastamonuspor match since appointed of manager. Denizli resigned from his duty on 1 March 2016.

=== Kasımpaşa ===
On 2 October 2018, Denizli was appointed as the head coach of Kasımpaşa. Denizli resigned in May 2019 two weeks before the end of the season.

=== Tractor ===
Denizli was appointed as the head coach of Tractor in June 2019. One of his biggest successes during his career at Tractor FC, was winning the Persepolis–Tractor rivalry and when he was the head coach, Tractor defeated Persepolis after more than five years. However, he was sacked on 7 December 2019 after a series of bad results, including a 4–2 home loss to Esteghlal.

=== Altay ===
On 28 April 2021, Denizli was appointed as the head coach of Altay. He requested that the proceeds from the contract he signed with Altay to be donated to the Mehmetçik Foundation and the Veterans and Martyrs Families Foundation of Turkey. He finished the regular season in 5th place in the TFF 1. League earning Altay a spot in the promotion play-offs, later becoming play-off champions and getting Altay promoted to the Süper Lig. Denizli resigned in January 2022 after going on a 13 match winless streak in the Süper Lig.

== Career statistics ==
=== Player ===
Appearances and goals by club, season and competition
Club	Season	League		Cup (Note: Includes Türkiye Kupası, Atatürk Kupası, Başbakanlık Kupası, Cumhurbaşkanlığı Kupası and TSYD Kupası)		Europe (Note: Includes European Cup, UEFA Cup, UEFA Cup Winners' Cup,)		Total	
Club	Season	Apps	Goals	Apps	Goals	Apps	Goals	Apps	Goals
Altay	1967–68	7	3	6	4	-	-	13	7
Altay	1968–69	24	3	5	0	2	1	31	4
Altay	1969–70	27	8	3	0	2	0	32	8
Altay	1970–71	28	5	2	0	-	-	30	5
Altay	1971–72	28	10	10	2	-	-	28	12
Altay	1972–73	25	12	2	0	-	-	27	12
Altay	1973–74	25	7	6	2	-	-	31	9
Altay	1974–75	28	5	2	0	-	-	30	5
Altay	1975–76	22	4	0	0	-	-	22	4
Altay	1976–77	26	10	2	0	-	-	28	10
Altay	1977–78	27	5	3	0	2	3	32	8
Altay	1978–79	23	9	9	4	-	-	32	13
Altay	1979–80	22	12	8	7	-	-	30	19
Altay	1980–81	21	9	2	1	1	0	24	10
Altay	1981–82	26	12	4	2	-	-	30	14
Altay	1982–83	27	7	4	2	-	-	31	9
Altay	Total	386	121	68	24	7	4	461	149
Galatasaray	1983–84	15	3	7	2	-	-	22	5
Career total		401	124	75	26	7	4	483	154

=== International ===
Appearances and goals by national team and year
National team	Year	Apps	Goals
Turkey	1977	4	1
Turkey	1979	6	1
Turkey	1980	1	0
Total		10	2

Scores and results list Turkey's goal tally first, score column indicates score after each Denizli goal.

List of international goals scored by Mustafa Denizli
No.	Date	Venue	Opponent	Score	Result	Competition
1	6 April 1977	Ankara 19 Mayıs Stadium, Ankara, Turkey	Finland	1–0	1–2	Friendly
2	28 October 1979	Empire Stadium, Gżira, Malta	Malta	2–0	2–1	UEFA Euro 1980 qualifying

=== Managerial statistics ===
As of 9 January 2022

Team	Nat	From	To	Record				
Team	Nat	From	To	G	W	D	L	Win %
Galatasaray	(Turkey)	1987	1989	99	60	22	17	60.61
Aachen	(Germany)	1989	1990	15	5	1	9	33.33
Galatasaray	(Turkey)	1990	1992	77	47	14	16	61.04
Kocaelispor	(Turkey)	1994	1996	81	34	24	23	41.98
Turkey	(Turkey)	1996	2000	35	11	10	14	31.43
Fenerbahçe	(Turkey)	2000	2001	66	40	8	18	60.61
Manisaspor	(Turkey)	2003	2004	37	20	7	10	54.05
Pas Tehran	(Iran)	2004	2006	51	26	17	8	50.98
Persepolis	(Iran)	2006	2007	30	14	11	5	46.67
Beşiktaş	(Turkey)	2008	2010	82	45	17	20	54.88
Persepolis	(Iran)	2011	2012	24	8	7	9	33.33
Çaykur Rizespor	(Turkey)	2012	2013	17	10	2	5	58.82
Khazar Lankaran	(Azerbaijan)	2013	2014	26	11	9	6	42.31
Galatasaray	(Turkey)	2015	2016	22	11	6	5	50.00
Eskişehirspor	(Turkey)	2017	2017	16	6	6	4	37.50
Kasımpaşa	(Turkey)	2018	2019	32	11	6	15	34.38
Tractor	(Iran)	2019	2019	13	7	3	3	53.85
Altay	(Turkey)	2021	2022	28	12	3	13	42.86
Total				751	378	173	200	50.33

== Honours ==
=== Player ===
Altay

- Turkish Cup: 1966–67, 1979–80

=== Managerial ===
Galatasaray

- European Cup: Semi-finals 1988–89
- Süper Lig: 1987–88
- Turkish Cup: 1990–91
- Cumhurbaşkanlığı Kupası: 1988, 1991

Fenerbahçe

- Süper Lig: 2000–01

Beşiktaş

- Süper Lig: 2008–09
- Turkish Cup: 2008–09

Çaykur Rizespor

- TFF First League: 2012–13

Altay

- TFF First League Playoffs: 2020–21

=== Awards and achievements ===
- 1.Lig top goalscorer: 1979–80 at Altay
- IFFHS's 11th best national team coach in the world: 2000
