= Şenol Güneş =

Turkish football manager (born 1952)

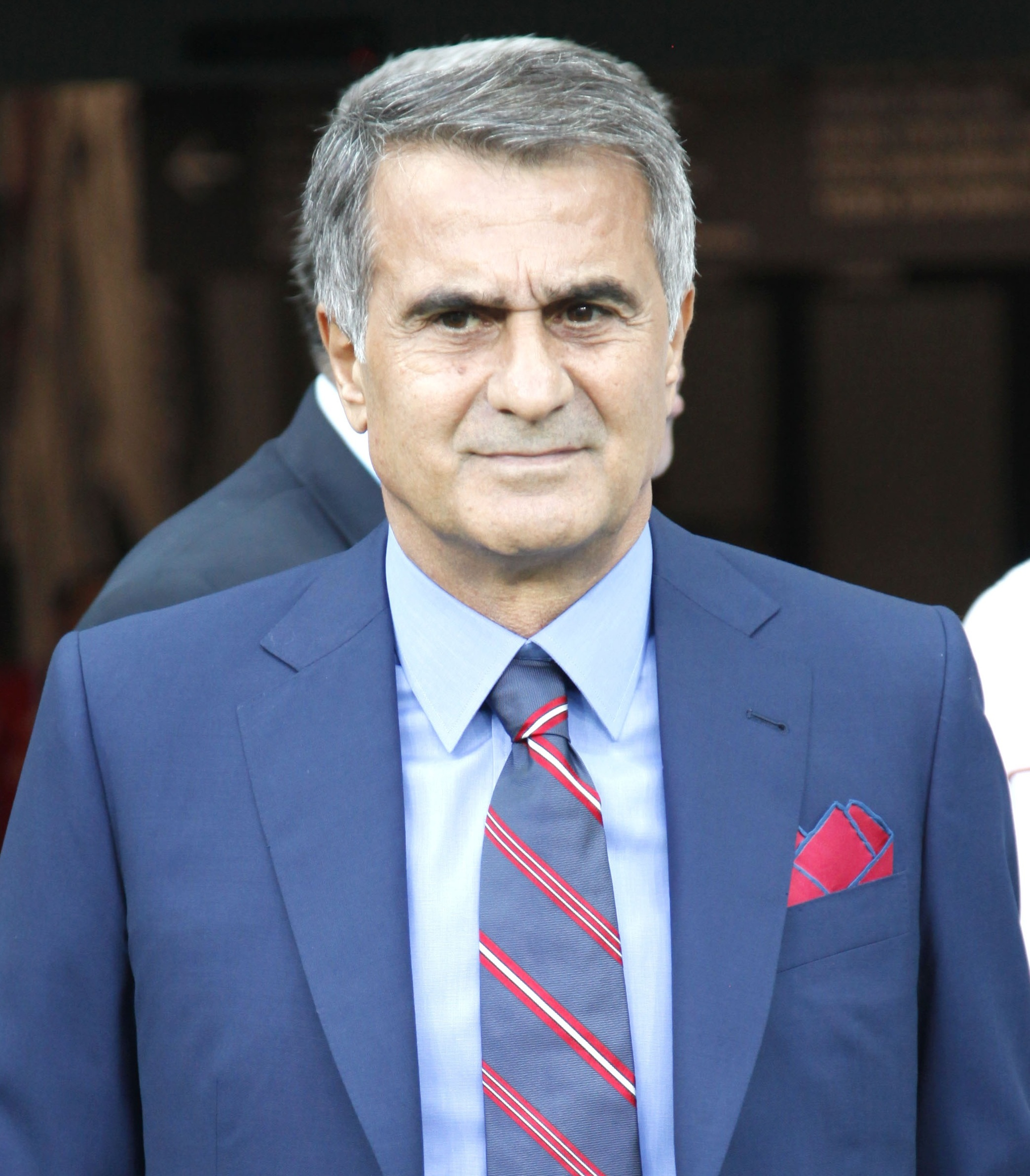
- Güneş in 2017

Personal information
- Date of birth: 1 June 1952 (age 74)
- Place of birth: Trabzon, Turkey
- Height: 1.81 m (5 ft 11 in)
- Position: Goalkeeper

Team information
- Current team: Trabzonspor (director of professional football)

Youth career
- 1967–1968: Erdoğdu Gençlik
- 1968–1969: Sebat Gençlik
- 1969–1970: Trabzonspor

Senior career*
Years	Team	Apps	(Gls)
1970–1972	Sebat Gençlik	57	(0)
1972–1987	Trabzonspor	424	(0)
Total		481	(0)

International career
1975–1987	Turkey	31	(0)

Managerial career
- 1988–1989: Trabzonspor
- 1989–1992: Boluspor
- 1992–1993: İstanbulspor
- 1993–1997: Trabzonspor
- 1997–1998: Antalyaspor
- 1998–1999: Sakaryaspor
- 2000–2004: Turkey
- 2005: Trabzonspor
- 2007–2009: FC Seoul
- 2009–2013: Trabzonspor
- 2014–2015: Bursaspor
- 2015–2019: Beşiktaş
- 2019–2021: Turkey
- 2022–2023: Beşiktaş
- 2024–2025: Trabzonspor
Medal record
Men's football
Representing Turkey (as manager)
FIFA World Cup
Bronze medal – third place	2002 Korea & Japan
FIFA Confederations Cup
Bronze medal – third place	2003 France
- * Club domestic league appearances and goals

Şenol Güneş T.C. (Turkish pronunciation: [ʃeˈnoɫ ˈɟyneʃ], born 1 June 1952) is a Turkish football manager and former player who is currently the director of professional football for Süper Lig club Trabzonspor. His most notable managerial achievements to date include coaching the Turkey national team to third place in the 2002 FIFA World Cup and winning two Süper Lig titles; both of them with Beşiktaş. He is also noted for stints in his boyhood club Trabzonspor. His playing career there saw the club win six of their seven Süper Lig titles.

== Playing career ==
Güneş began his amateur career at Erdoğdu Gençlik as a goalkeeper. Shortly after he was recruited for the Trabzonspor development team, and began playing for the senior team soon after. He played for Trabzonspor for twelve years between 1975 and 1987. During this period he won six league championships. In the 1978–79 season, he set the Süper Lig clean sheet record by not conceding a single goal for 1,110 minutes. He was part of the "Trabzonpor Efsanesi" ("The Legend of Trabzonspor", a name given by the Turkish press) along with other local players such as Turgay Semercioğlu, Necmi Perekli and Ali Kemal Denizci. Güneş has 31 caps for the Turkey national team, being the captain in five games.

== Managerial career ==
His managerial career started at Trabzonspor, where he was assistant manager before being promoted. He came close to winning Süper Lig in the 1995–96 campaign after leading all season, but in the end his team came second. That year, Trabzonspor also played in the 1996–97 UEFA Cup where they were knocked out by Schalke 04. He left the club soon after, and worked at Antalyaspor and Sakaryaspor.

In 2000, he was hired to manage the Turkey national team. Turkey qualified for the 2002 FIFA World Cup and finished third. Güneş won the UEFA Coach of the Year award for 2002. After the World Cup, he received many offers from Greece, Brazil and Spain, but he wanted to stay with Turkey. After the national team failed to qualify for UEFA Euro 2004, Güneş was sacked as manager.

He returned to Trabzonspor in January 2005, signing a three-and-a-half-year contract but left after finishing narrowly in second place. At this time, there were rumours that Güneş would be taking a coaching job in Iran or in the United Arab Emirates.

On 8 December 2006, FC Seoul, one of the leading football clubs in the K League, announced their three-year contract with Güneş starting from 2007.

Three years later, Güneş returned to his hometown as head coach of Trabzonspor for the fourth time, replacing Hugo Broos. In the 2010-11 campaign, he again led the entire season with Trabzonspor, but finished second once again at the end of the season. Later, it was revealed the 2011 Turkish sports corruption scandal was the main cause of this. After Trabzonspor, he signed with Bursaspor on a one-year contract. Bursaspor finished in sixth place in 2014–15 Süper Lig and reached the Turkish Cup final that year. On 11 June 2015, he signed with a two-and-a-half year contract with Beşiktaş. Güneş led Beşiktaş to their 14th title (and first since 2009) in 2016. For Güneş, it was his first title as manager. He led them to their 15th and second title in a row in 2017.

On 28 February 2019, it was announced that Güneş would take the Turkey national team managerial post for a second time on a four-year deal, 15 years after his last stint, effective from 1 June 2019. He oversaw Turkey's 2–0 win over Albania in the opening UEFA Euro 2020 qualifiers.

On 28 October 2022, Güneş joined Beşiktaş for his second stint, following the departure of French head coach Valérien Ismaël.

On 10 September 2024 Şenol Güneş signed a two-and-a-half year contract with Trabzonspor, becoming the club's head coach.

== Personal life ==
Güneş was born in Trabzon, Turkey, and graduated from Karadeniz Technical University. He taught at a middle school in Trabzon between 1978 and 1983.

He and his wife Semra have two daughters.

== Career statistics ==
=== Club ===
Appearances and goals by club, season and competition
Club	Season	League			Turkish Cup		Europe (Note: Includes European Cup, UEFA Cup, UEFA Cup Winners' Cup,)		Other (Note: Includes Atatürk Cup, Chancellor Cup, Turkish Super Cup and TSYD Cup)		Total	
Club	Season	Division	Apps	Goals	Apps	Goals	Apps	Goals	Apps	Goals	Apps	Goals
Sebat Gençlik	1970–71	2. Lig	–	–	–	–	–	–	–	–	–	–
Sebat Gençlik	1971–72	2. Lig	–	–	–	–	–	–	–	–	–	–
Sebat Gençlik	Total		57	–	–	–	–	–	–	–	57	–
Trabzonspor	1972–73	1. Lig	10	0	–	–	–	–	–	–	10	0
Trabzonspor	1973–74	1. Lig	18	0	6	0	–	–	–	–	24	0
Trabzonspor	1974–75	Süper Lig	26	0	7	0	–	–	1	0	34	0
Trabzonspor	1975–76	Süper Lig	24	0	8	0	8	0	4	0	36	0
Trabzonspor	1976–77	Süper Lig	28	0	10	0	3	0	4	0	45	0
Trabzonspor	1977–78	Süper Lig	28	0	6	0	2	0	2	0	38	0
Trabzonspor	1978–79	Süper Lig	30	0	2	0	–	–	1	0	33	0
Trabzonspor	1979–80	Süper Lig	30	0	6	0	2	0	1	0	39	0
Trabzonspor	1980–81	Süper Lig	29	0	2	0	2	0	1	0	34	0
Trabzonspor	1981–82	Süper Lig	31	0	5	0	2	0	1	0	39	0
Trabzonspor	1982–83	Süper Lig	34	0	7	0	2	0	1	0	44	0
Trabzonspor	1983–84	Süper Lig	33	0	9	0	2	0	1	0	45	0
Trabzonspor	1984–85	Süper Lig	32	0	7	0	2	0	1	0	42	0
Trabzonspor	1985–86	Süper Lig	28	0	3	0	–	–	–	–	31	0
Trabzonspor	1986–87	Süper Lig	32	0	6	0	–	–	–	–	38	0
Trabzonspor	Total		413	0	84	0	17	0	18	0	532	0
Career total			470	0	84	0	17	0	18	0	589	0

=== International ===
Appearances and goals by national team and year
National team	Year	Apps	Goals
Turkey	1976	2	0
Turkey	1977	4	0
Turkey	1978	4	0
Turkey	1979	6	0
Turkey	1980	3	0
Turkey	1981	5	0
Turkey	1982	3	0
Turkey	1983	2	0
Turkey	1984	0	0
Turkey	1985	0	0
Turkey	1986	0	0
Turkey	1987	2	0
Total		31	0

=== Managerial statistics ===
As of match played 8 March 2025

Team	From	To	Record				
Team	From	To	G	W	D	L	Win %
Trabzonspor	13 September 1988	17 August 1989	36	19	7	10	52.78
Boluspor	19 October 1989	30 June 1992	92	28	31	33	30.43
Trabzonspor	23 September 1993	3 February 1997	150	98	27	25	65.33
Antalyaspor	28 July 1997	30 June 1998	37	11	11	15	29.73
Sakaryaspor	1 September 1998	8 February 1999	17	5	4	8	29.41
Turkey	1 July 2000	6 March 2004	50	23	13	14	46.00
Trabzonspor	17 January 2005	26 September 2005	29	19	4	6	65.52
FC Seoul	8 January 2007	25 November 2009	125	55	43	27	44.00
Trabzonspor	4 December 2009	29 January 2013	149	72	43	34	48.32
Bursaspor	10 June 2014	4 June 2015	49	22	16	11	44.90
Beşiktaş	12 June 2015	31 May 2019	199	117	46	36	58.79
Turkey	18 March 2019	10 September 2021	32	15	10	7	46.88
Beşiktaş	28 October 2022	6 October 2023	43	30	8	5	69.77
Trabzonspor	3 September 2024	12 March 2025	26	10	7	9	38.46
Total			1,034	524	270	240	50.68

== Honours ==
=== Player ===
Trabzonspor

- Süper Lig: 1975–76, 1976–77, 1978–79, 1979–80, 1980–81, 1983–84
- Turkish Cup: 1976–77, 1977–78, 1983–84
- Turkish Super Cup: 1976, 1977, 1978, 1979, 1980, 1983

=== Manager ===
Trabzonspor

- Turkish Cup: 1994–95, 2009–10
- Turkish Super Cup: 1995, 2010

Beşiktaş

- Süper Lig: 2015–16, 2016–17

Turkey

- FIFA World Cup third place: 2002
- FIFA Confederations Cup third place: 2003

=== Awards and achievements ===
- UEFA Team of the Year: 2002
- IFFHS's third best national team coach of the world: 2002
- 2002 Turkish State Medal of Distinguished Service

== See also ==
- List of football managers with the most matches
- Şenol Güneş Stadium
