= Cemil Turan =

Turkish footballer

Personal information
- Full name: Cemil Turan
- Date of birth: 1 January 1947 (age 79)
- Place of birth: Üsküdar, Istanbul, Turkey
- Height: 1.73 m (5 ft 8 in)
- Position: Striker

Senior career*
| Years | Team | Apps | (Gls) |
| 1966–1968 | Sarıyer G.K. | 64 | (24) |
| 1968–1972 | İstanbulspor | 117 | (32) |
| 1972–1980 | Fenerbahçe | 304 | (194) |
| Total | | 485 | (250) |

International career^{‡}
| 1970–1979 | Turkey | 44 | (19) |
- * Club domestic league appearances and goals as of 16:12, 30 April 2011 (UTC) ‡ National team caps and goals as of 16:12, 30 April 2011 (UTC)

Cemil Turan (born 1 January 1947) is a former Turkish football player and the current director of Fenerbahçe S.K. Academy.

== Career ==
He debuted at Sarıyer G.K. when he was 14. He transferred first to Istanbulspor and then to Fenerbahçe, where he won 3 league championship titles (1974, 1975, 1978) and scored a total of 194 goals for them. He was three times league topscorer with 14 goals in 1974 and with 17 goals in 1976 and 1978. Between 1969 and 1979, Turan scored 19 goals in 44 matches for the Turkey national football team, a total that ranks him as the seventh all-time goalscorer. After his retirement in 1980, Turan served at various administrative positions first in Istanbulspor and then in Fenerbahçe. He is currently coordinator for the sporting infrastructure of Fenerbahçe.

== Match-fixing Scandal ==
On 3 July 2011, Turan was taken into custody because of alleged involvement in several cases of player manipulation. He was later released and all charges were dropped.

== Honours ==
Fenerbahçe

- Turkish League: 1973–74, 1974–75, 1977–78
- Turkish Cup: 1973–74, 1978–79
- Turkish Super Cup: 1973, 1975, 1978, 1980
- TSYD Cup: 1973, 1975, 1976, 1978, 1979, 1980

Individual

- Gol Kralı: 1973–74, 1975–76, 1977–78
- Turkish Footballer of the Year: 1977
