= Özer Umdu =

Turkish footballer

Personal information
- Full name: Özer Umdu
- Date of birth: 1 January 1952 (age 74)
- Place of birth: Balıkesir, Turkey
- Position: Forward

Youth career
- 1968–1971: Balıkesirspor

Senior career*
Years	Team	Apps	(Gls)
1971–1976	Balıkesirspor	27	(6)
1976–1978	Zonguldakspor	59	(15)
1978–1980	Adanaspor	59	(23)
1980–1981	Beşiktaş	27	(7)
1973–1978	Adanaspor	72	(9)
- * Club domestic league appearances and goals as of 2 July 2017 ‡ National team caps and goals as of 2 July 2017

Özer Umdu (born 1 January 1952) is a Turkish retired professional football player who played as a forward.

== Professional career ==
Umdu was the top scorer, or Gol Kralı, for the 1978–79 1.Lig with 15 goals.
