= Bora Öztürk =

Turkish footballer (1955–1997)

Personal information
- Full name: Bora Öztürk
- Date of birth: 20 May 1955
- Place of birth: Rumelikavağı, Turkey
- Date of death: 6 August 1997 (aged 42)
- Height: 1.87 m (6 ft 2 in)
- Position: Striker

Senior career*
Years	Team	Apps	(Gls)
1973–1974	Sakaryaspor	26	(8)
1974–1975	Şekerspor	0	(0)
1975–1977	Göztepe	50	(11)
1977–1979	Altay	53	(20)
1979–1988	Beşiktaş	103	(26)
1980–1981	→ Adanaspor (loan)	28	(15)
1984	→ Antalyaspor (loan)	25	(11)
1988	Zonguldakspor	1	(0)

International career^{‡}
1981	Turkey	1	(0)
- * Club domestic league appearances and goals as of 18:11, 26 May 2022 (UTC) ‡ National team caps and goals as of 18:11, 26 May 2022 (UTC)

Bora Öztürk (20 May 1955 – 6 August 1997) was a Turkish professional football player who played as a striker.

== Career ==
Bora was a football player, who began his senior career at Sakaryaspor in 1973. He followed that up with stints at Şekerspor, Göztepe, and Altay. He made his name for his successful tenure at Beşiktaş winning two Süper Ligs, and as the top scorer when on loan with Adanaspor in the 1980–81 1.Lig season. He finished his career with Zonguldakspor in 1988. He died of pharyngeal cancer in 1997.

== International career ==
Bora made one appearance for the Turkey national football team in a 3-0 1982 FIFA World Cup qualification loss to the Soviet Union on 7 October 1981. European under-16 championship gold medal in 1994.

== Honors ==
Beşiktaş

- Süper Lig: 1981-1982, 1985-1986
