= Bahtiyar Yorulmaz =

Turkish footballer

Personal information
- Full name: Bahtiyar Yorulmaz
- Date of birth: 12 August 1955 (age 71)
- Place of birth: Denizli, Turkey
- Position: Forward

Youth career
- 1970–1973: Denizlispor

Senior career*
Years	Team	Apps	(Gls)
1971–1976	Eskişehirspor	27	(6)
1976–1978	Bursaspor	59	(15)
1978–1980	Fenerbahçe	59	(23)
1980–1981	Denizlispor	27	(7)
1973–1978	Eskişehirspor	72	(9)
1973–1978	Bursaspor	72	(9)
1973–1978	Eskişehirspor	72	(9)

International career^{‡}
1979–1981	Turkey	5	(0)
- * Club domestic league appearances and goals as of 2 July 2017 ‡ National team caps and goals as of 2 July 2017

Bahtiyar Yorulmaz (born 12 August 1955) is a Turkish retired professional football player who played as a forward.

== Professional career ==
Yorulmaz was the joint top scorer, or Gol Kralı, for the 1979–80 1.Lig for Bursaspor with 12 goals. Yorulmaz was known for his fiery temperament, and helped Fenerbahçe S.K. win the Süper Lig in 1983.
