= 1965–66 1.Lig =

8th season of top-tier Turkish football

1.Lig
- Season: 1965–66
- Champions: Beşiktaş; 4th title
- Relegated: Şekerspor; Beykoz
- European Cup: Beşiktaş
- Cup Winners' Cup: Galatasaray
- Inter-Cities Fairs Cup: Göztepe
- Matches played: 240
- Goals scored: 545 (2.27 per match)
- Top goalscorer: Ertan Adatepe (20 goals)

Statistics of the Turkish First Football League for the 1965–66 season.

== Overview ==
It was contested by 16 teams, and Beşiktaş J.K. won the championship.

== League table ==
Pos	Team	Pld	W	D	L	GF	GA	GD	Pts	Qualification or relegation
1	Beşiktaş (C)	30	20	8	2	52	16	+36	48	Qualification to European Cup first round
2	Galatasaray	30	17	8	5	53	20	+33	42	Qualification to Cup Winners' Cup first round
3	Gençlerbirliği	30	15	8	7	32	24	+8	38	
4	Fenerbahçe	30	10	12	8	32	25	+7	32	
5	Göztepe A.Ş.	30	12	8	10	33	27	+6	32	Invitation to Inter-Cities Fairs Cup first round
6	Altay	30	10	8	12	28	28	0	28	
7	MKE Ankaragücü	30	10	7	13	52	52	0	27	
8	Feriköy	30	7	13	10	28	32	−4	27	
9	Türk Telekomspor	30	9	9	12	30	39	−9	27	
10	Vefa	30	9	9	12	26	36	−10	27	
11	Ankara Demirspor	30	8	11	11	32	43	−11	27	
12	İzmirspor	30	11	5	14	33	46	−13	27	
13	Hacettepe Spor	30	8	9	13	26	35	−9	25	
14	İstanbulspor	30	10	5	15	28	45	−17	25	
15	Beypazarı Şekerspor (R)	30	7	10	13	40	47	−7	24	Relegation to Turkish Second Football League
16	Beykoz (R)	30	6	12	12	22	32	−10	24	Relegation to Turkish Second Football League

Rules for classification: 1) points; 2) goal difference; 3) number of goals scored.
(C) Champions; (R) Relegated

== Results ==
Home \ Away	ALT	AND	AGÜ	BJK	BYK	FNB	FER	GAL	GEN	GÖZ	HAC	İST	İZM	PTT	ŞKR	VEF
Altay		2–1	3–1	1–2	0–0	2–1	0–0	0–1	1–0	2–0	0–0	0–0	3–0	1–0	1–0	1–1
Ankara Demirspor	1–0		2–2	1–5	3–0	1–1	2–2	0–0	0–2	0–0	1–2	0–0	4–1	2–0	2–1	3–1
Ankaragücü	2–0	5–1		0–1	1–1	1–5	1–2	0–3	5–1	0–3	1–2	2–2	6–1	2–2	3–3	2–1
Beşiktaş	2–1	0–0	2–0		0–3	0–0	3–0	0–1	0–0	2–1	1–0	3–0	1–1	2–1	1–1	3–0
Beykoz	2–1	0–0	1–0	0–4		1–0	1–1	0–0	0–0	0–1	2–1	0–0	0–2	1–1	2–3	1–2
Fenerbahçe	1–0	0–1	0–0	0–2	2–1		0–0	0–0	1–1	1–0	2–1	1–2	2–0	1–1	2–1	0–2
Feriköy	0–0	0–0	0–1	1–4	0–0	0–1		1–1	0–1	1–1	0–0	3–0	2–2	1–2	2–1	0–0
Galatasaray	1–1	3–1	5–2	0–0	0–0	2–0	3–1		1–0	0–1	4–1	1–0	3–0	3–0	2–1	1–2
Gençlerbirliği	2–1	1–0	2–2	2–2	3–1	1–0	0–1	1–0		1–0	0–0	1–0	2–1	2–3	1–0	2–0
Göztepe	3–2	2–0	0–1	0–0	3–2	1–1	4–1	1–0	1–0		1–0	0–1	0–1	1–2	1–1	1–1
Hacettepe	1–2	1–2	2–1	1–3	1–0	0–0	0–2	2–2	1–2	2–3		1–0	2–1	0–0	0–0	1–0
İstanbulspor	2–0	4–1	2–1	0–2	1–0	0–0	0–2	1–5	0–2	0–3	2–1		3–2	2–1	3–0	1–2
İzmirspor	0–1	2–2	2–3	0–2	1–0	0–0	1–0	1–5	2–0	2–0	1–0	2–0		1–0	1–3	2–0
PTT	3–0	2–0	0–2	1–2	0–0	1–4	1–0	1–0	1–1	2–0	2–2	2–0	0–0		0–5	0–0
Şekerspor	0–0	1–1	1–4	0–2	1–1	1–4	2–2	1–3	0–1	1–1	0–1	5–1	2–1	2–1		2–0
Vefa	1–0	3–0	2–1	0–1	0–2	2–2	0–3	1–3	0–0	0–0	0–0	2–1	0–2	2–0	1–1	

Source: TFF, Mackolik
Legend: Blue = home team win; Yellow = draw; Red = away team win.
