= Aykut Yiğit =

Turkish footballer and manager

Personal information
- Full name: Aykut Yiğit
- Date of birth: 7 October 1959
- Place of birth: Adapazarı, Turkey
- Date of death: 7 September 2003 (aged 43)
- Place of death: Akdağmadeni, Turkey
- Position: Striker

Youth career
- Sakaryaspor

Senior career*
Years	Team	Apps	(Gls)
1979–1981	Eskişehirspor	44	(6)
1981–1986	Sakaryaspor	123	(49)
1986–1987	Fenerbahçe	6	(0)
1987	→Bakırköyspor (loan)	14	(1)
1987–1989	Altay	57	(18)
1989–1990	Sakaryaspor	24	(3)
1990–1993	Ayvalıkgücü	100	(33)
1993–1994	Balıkesirspor	15	(2)

International career^{‡}
1984	Turkey	3	(0)

Managerial career
- 1994: Kardemir Karabükspor (assistant)
- 1994–1995: Çerkezköyspor
- 1996–1997: Ayvalıkgücü
- 1997: Turgutluspor
- 1997–1998: REO Atilla Spor
- 2002–2003: Sakaryaspor (assistant)
- * Club domestic league appearances and goals as of 5 August 2017 ‡ National team caps and goals as of 5 August 2017

Aykut Yiğit (7 October 1959 – 7 September 2002) was a Turkish professional football player who played as a striker, and a football manager until his death.

Aykut was top scorer during the 1983–84 1.Lig season with Sakaryaspor, the team he is best known for. He played for various Turkish teams before moving on to a management career. He died in a car accident while assistant manager for his first club Sakaryaspor.

== International career ==
Aykut made his debut for the Turkey national football team in a friendly 0-0 draw with Bulgaria on 16 October 1984.
