= Ertan Adatepe =

Turkish footballer (born 1938)

Personal information
- Date of birth: 1 January 1938 (age 88)
- Place of birth: Ankara, Turkey
- Height: 1.80 m (5 ft 11 in)
- Position: Striker

Senior career*
Years	Team	Apps	(Gls)
1956–1958	Ankaragücü	3	(3)
1958–1960	Galatasaray	7	(1)
1960–1966	Ankaragücü	157	(77)
1966–1971	TPP	120	(48)
1971	Göztepe	0	(0)

International career
1956–1957	Turkey U18	5	(3)
1962	Turkey B	1	(0)
1962	Turkey	1	(0)
- * Club domestic league appearances and goals

Ertan Adatepe (born 1 January 1938) is a Turkish former footballer. He played in the striker position. Ertan made one appearance for the senior Turkey national football team, in a friendly 0-0 tie with Ethiopia.

Ertan is best known for his years at Ankaragücü, and while there was twice the top goal scorer of the Süper Lig.

== See also ==
- List of Süper Lig top scorers
