= 1984–85 1.Lig =

27th season of top-tier Turkish football

1.Lig
- Season: 1984–85
- Champions: Fenerbahçe; 11th title
- Relegated: Antalyaspor; Boluspor
- European Cup: Fenerbahçe
- Cup Winners' Cup: Galatasaray
- UEFA Cup: Beşiktaş
- Matches: 306
- Goals: 686 (2.24 per match)
- Top goalscorer: Aykut Yiğit (20 goals)

The following are the statistics of the Turkish First Football League in season 1984/1985.

== Overview ==
It was contested by 18 teams, and Fenerbahçe S.K. won the championship.

== League table ==
Pos	Team	Pld	W	D	L	GF	GA	GD	Pts	Qualification or relegation
1	Fenerbahçe (C)	34	18	14	2	65	25	+40	50	Qualification to European Cup first round
2	Beşiktaş	34	19	12	3	49	19	+30	50	Qualification to UEFA Cup first round
3	Trabzonspor	34	14	14	6	38	26	+12	42	Invitation to Balkans Cup
4	MKE Ankaragücü	34	12	14	8	33	27	+6	38	
5	Galatasaray	34	11	14	9	34	28	+6	36	Qualification to Cup Winners' Cup first round
6	Sakaryaspor	34	14	8	12	44	39	+5	36	
7	Kocaelispor	34	11	12	11	30	31	−1	34	
8	Sarıyer	34	8	17	9	47	45	+2	33	
9	Orduspor	34	11	11	12	35	36	−1	33	
10	Eskişehirspor	34	10	12	12	39	48	−9	32	
11	Gençlerbirliği	34	9	13	12	41	45	−4	31	
12	Zonguldakspor	34	9	13	12	31	35	−4	31	
13	Bursaspor	34	9	13	12	39	47	−8	31	
14	Malatyaspor	34	10	11	13	35	46	−11	31	
15	Altay	34	8	14	12	34	39	−5	30	
16	Denizlispor	34	9	11	14	39	48	−9	29	
17	Antalyaspor (R)	34	11	6	17	33	49	−16	28	Relegation to Turkish Second Football League
18	Boluspor (R)	34	3	11	20	20	53	−33	17	Relegation to Turkish Second Football League

Rules for classification: 1) points; 2) goal difference; 3) number of goals scored.
(C) Champions; (R) Relegated

== Results ==
Home \ Away	ALT	ANT	BJK	BOL	BUR	DEN	ESK	FNB	GAL	GEN	KOC	MAL	AGÜ	ORD	SAK	SAR	TRA	ZON
Altay		1–1	0–0	1–1	2–0	3–1	0–1	2–2	0–1	3–0	1–1	3–0	2–2	2–1	2–1	1–1	2–2	0–0
Antalyaspor	1–0		0–3	2–0	1–0	2–1	0–0	3–4	0–3	2–2	0–1	1–0	3–0	0–0	1–2	2–0	1–0	1–0
Beşiktaş	1–0	2–0		2–0	3–0	1–0	1–0	2–2	1–3	1–0	3–0	3–1	1–0	3–1	2–0	2–2	0–0	2–0
Boluspor	1–1	1–0	0–2		2–2	1–2	0–1	0–1	0–0	0–0	0–1	2–1	0–2	0–1	1–1	0–0	1–1	2–1
Bursaspor	0–1	2–1	2–2	1–0		3–3	1–1	1–0	1–1	2–1	1–1	2–0	0–1	0–2	3–2	2–1	2–1	1–1
Denizlispor	0–0	2–1	1–2	3–0	2–0		0–0	0–0	0–0	4–2	3–1	1–1	1–1	0–3	1–1	1–3	3–1	2–0
Eskişehirspor	3–1	2–0	0–0	2–2	3–2	0–0		0–1	3–0	2–1	0–2	3–3	2–1	2–1	2–0	1–1	0–0	1–2
Fenerbahçe	1–0	3–1	0–0	3–0	1–0	7–0	4–0		2–2	4–1	0–0	6–1	2–0	2–2	1–0	3–3	0–0	5–0
Galatasaray	0–0	1–2	0–0	0–0	1–2	0–1	3–1	1–1		2–1	2–1	2–1	1–1	2–0	0–0	2–1	2–0	1–1
Gençlerbirliği	2–1	0–0	1–1	3–0	1–1	3–2	2–0	1–1	2–1		1–1	1–0	1–1	2–0	2–0	2–2	2–2	3–0
Kocaelispor	2–0	2–1	1–1	1–0	1–1	1–1	2–1	0–1	1–0	0–0		1–1	1–1	0–2	2–1	3–0	0–1	1–0
Malatyaspor	2–0	2–0	1–3	3–1	1–1	2–1	3–2	0–0	0–0	2–0	2–0		0–0	1–0	2–0	2–1	0–2	0–2
MKE Ankaragücü	0–0	1–1	1–3	2–0	2–1	1–0	4–0	0–0	1–0	1–0	1–0	1–1		0–0	0–1	2–2	2–1	0–0
Orduspor	0–1	1–2	1–0	3–1	1–1	1–0	3–1	0–2	1–1	1–1	0–0	1–1	0–0		2–1	1–0	1–1	2–1
Sakaryaspor	3–1	2–1	0–0	4–1	3–1	4–2	4–1	2–0	0–1	3–2	1–0	0–0	0–3	2–0		1–1	0–0	1–0
Sarıyer	4–1	4–1	0–1	3–1	1–0	2–1	1–1	2–4	0–0	1–1	1–1	1–1	1–0	3–3	3–1		0–0	1–2
Trabzonspor	2–0	4–1	1–0	2–1	2–2	1–0	1–1	1–1	1–0	2–0	2–1	1–0	2–0	2–0	0–2	1–1		1–0
Zonguldakspor	2–2	3–0	1–1	1–1	1–1	0–0	2–2	0–1	2–1	2–0	1–0	4–0	0–1	1–0	1–1	0–0	0–0	

Source: TFF, Mackolik
Legend: Blue = home team win; Yellow = draw; Red = away team win.
