= Ömer Kaner =

Turkish football player and manager (1951–2026)

Personal information
- Date of birth: 21 May 1951
- Place of birth: Istanbul, Turkey
- Date of death: 12 February 2026 (aged 74)
- Height: 1.72 m (5 ft 8 in)
- Position: Forward

Senior career*
Years	Team	Apps	(Gls)
1973–1975	Eskişehirspor	56	(24)
1975–1977	Fenerbahçe	33	(7)
1977–1980	Zonguldakspor	65	(24)
1980–1982	Eskişehirspor	21	(3)
1982–1984	Fatih Karagümrük	16	(8)

International career
1974	Turkey	1	(0)

Managerial career
- 1985–1986: Bakırköyspor (assistant)
- 1987–1988: Fenerbahçe (head of football operations)
- 1988–1990: Fenerbahçe (assistant)
- 1990: Fenerbahçe (interim)
- 1990: Fenerbahçe (assistant)
- 1991–1992: Zeytinburnuspor
- 1991–1993: Fenerbahçe (assistant)
- 1993–1994: Denizlispor
- 1994–1995: Sarıyer
- 1995: Erzurumspor
- 1995–1996: Aydınspor
- 1996: Diyarbakırspor
- 1996: Çaykur Rizespor
- 1997: Göztepe
- 1997: Kemerspor
- 1997–1998: Karşıyaka
- 1998: Eskişehirspor
- 1999: Elazığspor
- 1999–2000: Kayseri Erciyesspor
- 2000–2001: Pogoń Szczecin
- 2001: Altay
- 2003: Hatayspor
- 2003: Aksarayspor
- * Club domestic league appearances and goals

Ömer Kaner (21 May 1951 – 12 February 2026) was a Turkish football coach and player. A forward, he played at Eskişehirspor, Fenerbahçe and Karagümrük. He was head coach of Turkey national futsal team. He played, coached and managed Fenerbahçe SK. Kaner died on 12 February 2026, at the age of 74.

== Managing career ==
- Fenerbahçe SK 1990
- Denizlispor 1993–1994
- Pogoń Szczecin 2000–2001
- Altay SK 2001–2002
- Turkey national futsal team 2006–
