= Fikri Elma =

Turkish footballer (1934–1999)

Personal information
- Full name: Fikri Elma
- Date of birth: 1 January 1934
- Place of birth: Ankara, Turkey
- Date of death: 15 November 1999 (aged 65)
- Place of death: Ankara, Turkey
- Position: Forward

Senior career*
Years	Team	Apps	(Gls)
1952–1969	Ankara Demirspor	303	(136)

International career
1953	Turkey U18	4	(4)
- * Club domestic league appearances and goals

Fikri Elma (1 January 1934 – 15 November 1999) was a Turkish footballer. He played as a forward, most notably for Ankara Demirspor, with whom he finished top scorer of the 1961–62 Milli Lig. Elma was one of the top scorers in Turkish league history with 128 goals to his name. He died in Ankara on 15 November 1999 and was interred in Karşıyaka cemetery.
