= 1979–80 1.Lig =

22nd season of top-tier Turkish football

1.Lig
- Season: 1979–80
- Champions: Trabzonspor; 4th title
- Relegated: Göztepe; Kayserispor; Diyarbakırspor
- European Cup: Trabzonspor
- Cup Winners' Cup: Altay
- UEFA Cup: Fenerbahçe
- Matches: 240
- Goals: 422 (1.76 per match)
- Top goalscorer: Bahtiyar Yorulmaz; Mustafa Denizli (12 each)

Statistics of the Turkish First Football League in season 1979/1980.

== Overview ==
It was contested by 16 teams, and Trabzonspor won the championship. The top goal scorer was known as "The Matador" for the '79 series.

== League table ==
Pos	Team	Pld	W	D	L	GF	GA	GD	Pts	Qualification or relegation
1	Trabzonspor (C)	30	12	15	3	25	11	+14	39	Qualification to European Cup first round
2	Fenerbahçe	30	12	11	7	31	27	+4	35	Qualification to UEFA Cup first round
3	Zonguldakspor	30	9	15	6	26	19	+7	33	Invitation to Balkans Cup
4	Bursaspor	30	12	9	9	28	28	0	33	
5	Çaykur Rizespor	30	14	4	12	37	34	+3	32	
6	Eskişehirspor	30	8	15	7	29	26	+3	31	
7	Orduspor	30	8	14	8	26	32	−6	30	
8	Adana Demirspor	30	10	9	11	26	23	+3	29	
9	Galatasaray	30	8	13	9	28	26	+2	29	
10	Adanaspor	30	9	11	10	21	21	0	29	
11	Beşiktaş	30	8	13	9	25	27	−2	29	
12	Altay	30	9	10	11	28	27	+1	28	Qualification to Cup Winners' Cup first round
13	Gaziantepspor	30	9	10	11	25	24	+1	28	
14	Göztepe A.Ş. (R)	30	8	11	11	27	33	−6	27	Relegation to Turkish Second Football League
15	Kayserispor (R)	30	6	13	11	19	28	−9	25	Relegation to Turkish Second Football League
16	Diyarbakırspor (R)	30	8	7	15	21	36	−15	23	Relegation to Turkish Second Football League

Rules for classification: 1) points; 2) goal difference; 3) number of goals scored.
(C) Champions; (R) Relegated

== Results ==
Home \ Away	ADS	ADA	ALT	BJK	BUR	DYB	ESK	FNB	GAL	GAZ	GÖZ	KAY	ORD	RİZ	TRA	ZON
Adana Demirspor		0–1	1–0	1–0	0–2	2–0	0–0	1–2	1–0	0–0	2–0	2–0	4–0	3–2	1–0	1–0
Adanaspor	1–1		0–0	1–0	1–0	3–1	1–1	0–1	1–0	1–0	4–1	0–1	1–1	2–1	0–0	0–1
Altay	0–0	0–0		0–0	4–0	1–0	2–0	4–2	3–1	2–1	1–3	2–0	0–0	2–3	1–1	1–2
Beşiktaş	1–1	1–0	1–1		0–1	2–1	1–1	1–1	2–0	1–1	0–0	2–1	0–0	1–2	0–0	1–0
Bursaspor	2–0	2–0	2–0	1–0		0–1	1–1	1–1	0–0	1–0	3–0	1–0	1–1	1–0	1–0	1–1
Diyarbakırspor	1–0	1–0	0–1	2–2	3–1		2–1	2–1	1–1	1–0	0–0	0–1	0–0	1–0	0–0	0–0
Eskişehirspor	1–1	1–1	1–0	1–1	2–2	5–0		1–1	1–1	1–0	1–0	1–0	0–0	2–1	0–0	1–0
Fenerbahçe	1–1	2–1	1–0	1–2	2–1	2–1	1–0		0–0	1–0	1–0	4–2	2–1	1–2	1–1	1–0
Galatasaray	1–0	1–2	0–0	1–2	3–0	1–0	2–1	1–1		0–0	1–1	2–0	3–0	3–0	1–0	1–1
Gaziantepspor	1–0	0–0	3–0	1–0	0–1	1–0	0–0	1–0	0–0		2–0	2–0	1–1	2–1	1–2	1–1
Göztepe	2–1	0–0	0–0	1–1	1–0	2–0	2–0	0–0	3–1	1–3		1–1	3–0	2–1	0–0	0–2
Kayserispor	0–0	0–0	0–0	3–1	0–0	1–1	1–1	0–0	1–1	1–0	3–2		0–0	1–0	0–1	0–0
Orduspor	1–0	2–0	1–0	1–2	4–1	3–1	0–1	1–0	1–1	1–1	0–0	1–0		2–1	1–2	2–2
Rizespor	2–1	1–0	2–1	1–0	3–1	1–0	3–2	0–0	1–0	4–1	1–0	1–1	1–1		1–1	1–0
Trabzonspor	1–1	0–0	1–0	0–0	0–0	1–0	1–0	2–0	2–0	2–1	1–1	1–0	4–0	1–0		0–0
Zonguldakspor	1–0	1–0	1–2	2–0	0–0	3–1	1–1	0–0	1–1	1–1	3–1	1–1	0–0	1–0	0–0	

Source: TFF, Mackolik
Legend: Blue = home team win; Yellow = draw; Red = away team win.
