= 1987–88 1.Lig =

30th season of top-tier Turkish football

1.Lig
- Season: 1987–88
- Champions: Galatasaray; 8th title
- Relegated: Denizlispor; Kocaelispor; Gençlerbirliği; Zonguldakspor
- European Cup: Galatasaray
- Cup Winners' Cup: Sakaryaspor
- UEFA Cup: Beşiktaş
- Matches: 380
- Goals: 1,032 (2.72 per match)
- Top goalscorer: Tanju Çolak (39 goals)

Statistics of Turkish First Football League in season 1987–88.

== Overview ==
Twenty clubs participated, and Galatasaray S.K. won the championship. Denizlispor, Kocaelispor, Gençlerbirliği and Zonguldakspor were relegated to Second League.

This was the first season where clubs were awarded 3 points for victories, in contrast to previous years where a victory had earned the winning club only 2 points.

== League table ==
Pos	Team	Pld	W	D	L	GF	GA	GD	Pts	Qualification or relegation
1	Galatasaray (C)	38	27	9	2	86	35	+51	90	Qualification to European Cup first round
2	Beşiktaş	38	22	12	4	68	29	+39	78	Qualification to UEFA Cup first round
3	Malatyaspor	38	17	11	10	64	61	+3	62	Invitation to Balkans Cup
4	Samsunspor	38	17	9	12	43	41	+2	60	
5	Bursaspor	38	17	6	15	63	56	+7	57	
6	Trabzonspor	38	16	9	13	57	51	+6	57	
7	Karşıyaka	38	13	17	8	43	34	+9	56	
8	Fenerbahçe	38	15	10	13	45	43	+2	55	
9	Sarıyer	38	12	16	10	60	51	+9	52	
10	Adana Demirspor	38	16	4	18	59	64	−5	52	
11	Sakaryaspor	38	14	9	15	54	67	−13	51	Qualification to Cup Winners' Cup first round
12	Altay	38	13	9	16	60	57	+3	48	
13	MKE Ankaragücü	38	11	13	14	46	47	−1	46	
14	Boluspor	38	13	7	18	45	52	−7	46	
15	Eskişehirspor	38	11	13	14	45	53	−8	46	
16	Çaykur Rizespor	38	13	7	18	37	56	−19	46	
17	Denizlispor (R)	38	12	9	17	35	48	−13	45	Relegation to Turkish Second Football League
18	Kocaelispor (R)	38	6	16	16	44	61	−17	34	Relegation to Turkish Second Football League
19	Gençlerbirliği (R)	38	7	9	22	41	65	−24	30	Relegation to Turkish Second Football League
20	Zonguldakspor (R)	38	6	9	23	37	61	−24	27	Relegation to Turkish Second Football League

Rules for classification: 1) points; 2) goal difference; 3) number of goals scored.
(C) Champions; (R) Relegated

== Results ==
Home \ Away	ADS	ALT	BJK	BOL	BUR	DEN	ESK	FNB	GAL	GEN	KSK	KOC	MAL	AGÜ	RİZ	SAK	SAM	SAR	TRA	ZON
Adana Demirspor		3–2	2–0	4–0	0–2	3–0	2–2	2–1	0–5	1–2	1–0	3–1	0–0	1–0	0–1	7–0	3–2	1–2	3–0	4–2
Altay	4–0		1–1	1–1	2–0	3–3	0–1	2–0	1–2	4–0	0–0	5–2	3–2	1–0	3–0	1–1	3–1	0–1	1–2	0–0
Beşiktaş	3–0	2–1		4–1	4–0	3–0	2–1	2–1	2–2	1–0	1–1	1–1	0–0	1–0	3–1	5–1	0–0	2–1	3–1	2–0
Boluspor	3–0	3–1	0–1		1–0	1–0	4–2	0–0	1–1	2–1	0–0	1–1	0–1	2–0	2–1	2–0	2–0	4–1	0–2	5–1
Bursaspor	3–0	2–1	2–1	2–1		0–2	3–1	0–0	1–1	4–1	2–1	2–0	4–1	0–1	5–2	1–2	2–2	2–0	2–0	1–0
Denizlispor	1–1	1–0	0–0	1–0	2–1		1–2	3–2	1–2	2–0	0–0	1–0	3–3	0–1	2–0	2–0	0–1	1–1	1–1	1–0
Eskişehirspor	2–1	2–2	0–1	1–0	2–1	4–0		2–1	0–1	1–0	1–1	1–1	0–2	3–3	0–1	4–2	1–2	2–2	2–1	0–3
Fenerbahçe	0–2	1–0	0–4	3–1	4–0	2–0	0–4		1–2	3–0	2–1	1–1	2–1	0–0	2–0	1–1	3–1	1–4	2–0	2–0
Galatasaray	3–0	5–1	0–0	1–0	5–2	3–1	1–1	1–1		2–1	2–0	5–1	3–1	3–1	5–0	3–2	3–0	2–2	2–1	3–1
Gençlerbirliği	2–0	0–3	1–1	1–0	1–1	2–1	1–1	1–1	1–2		1–0	2–2	1–2	1–1	6–1	1–1	0–1	1–1	2–3	3–0
Karşıyaka	0–0	1–1	2–1	1–1	2–2	0–1	4–0	0–0	1–2	1–0		2–2	2–1	2–1	1–0	4–1	2–0	1–1	1–1	1–0
Kocaelispor	5–1	2–3	1–1	1–1	0–2	1–0	0–0	1–1	1–2	1–1	0–1		1–2	3–0	0–0	1–2	1–1	3–2	3–0	1–0
Malatyaspor	2–7	3–0	5–3	2–1	1–4	3–1	1–0	1–0	3–1	1–0	2–2	3–2		0–0	2–1	4–2	0–1	2–2	0–0	0–0
MKE Ankaragücü	1–2	4–2	0–0	4–1	3–2	2–0	1–1	0–0	2–2	1–0	2–4	4–0	1–1		2–0	0–0	2–2	1–0	2–3	2–2
Rizespor	1–0	2–0	0–3	4–1	2–0	1–0	1–0	0–1	0–1	1–0	0–1	1–1	4–2	1–0		1–2	0–0	1–1	1–1	2–0
Sakaryaspor	2–1	0–1	1–3	2–1	5–3	1–0	0–0	2–0	0–2	3–2	0–1	1–1	2–2	3–2	3–4		1–0	1–1	4–2	4–0
Samsunspor	1–2	2–0	0–0	3–1	2–1	0–1	1–0	2–1	1–0	6–3	0–0	0–0	2–0	1–0	2–0	1–0		0–1	1–0	1–1
Sarıyer	2–1	3–3	1–2	0–1	2–1	1–1	5–0	1–2	1–1	3–2	1–1	3–0	3–3	0–0	0–0	1–2	2–0		1–1	3–1
Trabzonspor	2–0	2–1	0–3	3–0	0–0	1–1	1–1	1–2	2–3	3–0	3–0	3–1	2–3	3–1	3–1	1–0	4–1	2–1		1–0
Zonguldakspor	5–1	2–3	1–2	1–0	1–3	2–0	0–0	0–1	1–2	3–0	1–1	2–1	1–2	0–1	1–1	1–1	1–2	2–3	1–1	

Source: TFF, Mackolik
Legend: Blue = home team win; Yellow = draw; Red = away team win.
