= 1973–74 1.Lig =

16th season of top-tier Turkish football

1.Lig
- Season: 1973–74
- Champions: Fenerbahçe; 7th title
- Relegated: Mersin İdman Yurdu; Vefa
- European Cup: Fenerbahçe
- Cup Winners' Cup: Bursaspor
- UEFA Cup: Beşiktaş; Boluspor
- Matches played: 240
- Goals scored: 405 (1.69 per match)
- Top goalscorer: Cemil Turan (14 goals)

Statistics of the Turkish First Football League for the 1973–74 season.

== Overview ==
It was contested by 16 teams, and Fenerbahçe S.K. won the championship.

== League table ==
Pos	Team	Pld	W	D	L	GF	GA	GD	Pts	Qualification or relegation
1	Fenerbahçe (C)	30	15	13	2	39	15	+24	43	Qualification to European Cup first round
2	Beşiktaş	30	13	14	3	34	19	+15	40	Qualification to UEFA Cup first round
3	Boluspor	30	12	15	3	33	21	+12	39	Qualification to UEFA Cup first round
4	Eskişehirspor	30	14	8	8	34	24	+10	36	Invitation to Balkans Cup
5	Galatasaray	30	13	9	8	29	16	+13	35	
6	Altay	30	11	9	10	25	22	+3	31	
7	Adanaspor	30	8	13	9	20	26	−6	29	
8	Samsunspor	30	10	8	12	24	30	−6	28	
9	Bursaspor	30	8	12	10	19	25	−6	28	Qualification to Cup Winners' Cup first round
10	Adana Demirspor	30	9	9	12	19	21	−2	27	
11	Kayserispor	30	8	11	11	18	24	−6	27	
12	Giresunspor	30	8	10	12	28	32	−4	26	
13	Göztepe A.Ş.	30	8	10	12	24	28	−4	26	
14	MKE Ankaragücü	30	10	6	14	28	36	−8	26	
15	Mersin İdmanyurdu (R)	30	8	6	16	15	27	−12	22	Relegation to Turkish Second Football League
16	Vefa (R)	30	5	7	18	16	39	−23	17	Relegation to Turkish Second Football League

Rules for classification: 1) points; 2) goal difference; 3) number of goals scored.
(C) Champions; (R) Relegated

== Results ==
Home \ Away	ADS	ADA	ALT	BJK	BOL	BUR	ESK	FNB	GAL	GRS	GÖZ	KAY	MİY	AGÜ	SAM	VEF
Adana Demirspor		0–0	1–0	1–1	0–0	1–0	1–0	0–0	0–0	2–0	2–2	1–0	1–0	0–2	1–2	3–0
Adanaspor	1–0		0–0	1–2	1–1	0–0	1–0	1–1	0–0	1–0	1–0	0–0	1–0	2–1	2–0	1–0
Altay	2–1	1–0		1–0	1–0	2–1	1–0	0–1	0–1	1–1	1–2	0–0	1–0	4–2	0–0	2–0
Beşiktaş	1–0	2–1	1–1		1–0	0–0	0–0	0–0	2–1	1–0	1–1	3–0	1–0	2–1	4–0	2–1
Boluspor	1–1	3–1	0–0	1–1		0–0	1–0	1–1	1–0	2–1	0–0	2–0	1–0	3–0	1–0	1–0
Bursaspor	1–2	2–0	0–0	1–1	0–0		1–1	1–1	0–0	1–0	0–0	0–0	2–0	1–0	1–0	0–0
Eskişehirspor	1–0	1–0	1–0	0–0	2–2	1–0		2–1	2–0	2–1	3–0	0–0	2–0	2–1	1–0	3–0
Fenerbahçe	1–0	5–1	2–1	1–1	0–0	3–1	3–1		2–1	1–1	4–0	2–0	0–0	1–0	2–0	0–0
Galatasaray	0–1	1–0	1–0	0–1	3–1	4–0	3–0	0–0		2–1	1–0	1–0	2–0	3–0	2–0	1–2
Giresunspor	1–0	2–2	2–1	1–1	0–1	3–1	1–1	1–1	0–0		1–0	3–0	1–0	2–2	1–1	1–0
Göztepe	0–0	2–0	1–1	2–0	2–3	1–2	0–1	0–2	1–1	3–0		1–0	0–0	1–0	3–0	1–1
Kayserispor	2–0	1–1	0–0	0–0	1–1	0–1	2–2	0–0	2–0	1–0	0–0		2–0	1–0	0–2	2–0
Mersin İdman Yurdu	1–0	0–0	0–1	2–4	1–1	1–0	2–1	0–1	0–0	2–1	1–0	0–1		0–0	1–0	2–0
MKE Ankaragücü	1–0	1–1	0–1	1–0	1–1	1–0	1–0	0–1	0–0	1–2	1–0	3–2	2–1		2–4	1–0
Samsunspor	0–0	0–0	1–0	1–1	1–2	3–0	1–1	1–0	0–0	1–0	0–1	1–0	1–0	1–1		3–1
Vefa	1–0	0–0	3–2	0–0	2–2	0–2	1–3	1–2	0–1	0–0	1–0	0–1	0–1	0–2	2–0	

Source: TFF, Mackolik
Legend: Blue = home team win; Yellow = draw; Red = away team win.
