= 1980–81 1.Lig =

23rd season of top-tier Turkish football

1.Lig
- Season: 1980–81
- Champions: Trabzonspor (5th title)
- Relegated: Çaykur Rizespor; Mersin İdman Yurdu; Orduspor
- European Cup: Trabzonspor
- Cup Winners' Cup: Ankaragücü
- UEFA Cup: Adanaspor
- Matches: 240
- Goals: 466 (1.94 per match)
- Top goalscorer: Bora Öztürk (15 goals)

Statistics of Turkish First Football League in season 1980–81.

== Overview ==
It was contested by 16 teams, and Trabzonspor won the championship. 1981–82 European Cup Winners' Cup spot goes to Second League team Ankaragücü, who was also promoted and went back to 1. Lig at the end of the 1980/81 season.

== League table ==
Pos	Team	Pld	W	D	L	GF	GA	GD	Pts	Qualification or relegation
1	Trabzonspor (C)	30	16	7	7	41	21	+20	39	Qualification to European Cup first round
2	Adanaspor	30	13	8	9	36	28	+8	34	Qualification to UEFA Cup first round
3	Galatasaray	30	13	8	9	28	25	+3	34	Invitation to Balkans Cup
4	Gaziantepspor	30	12	9	9	23	22	+1	33	
5	Beşiktaş	30	12	7	11	27	23	+4	31	
6	Eskişehirspor	30	10	11	9	19	19	0	31	
7	Zonguldakspor	30	12	6	12	36	33	+3	30	
8	Kocaelispor	30	11	8	11	34	32	+2	30	
9	Bursaspor	30	12	6	12	30	30	0	30	
10	Fenerbahçe	30	9	11	10	31	27	+4	29	
11	Altay	30	8	13	9	29	30	−1	29	
12	Adana Demirspor	30	11	7	12	25	26	−1	29	
13	Boluspor	30	9	11	10	32	36	−4	29	
14	Çaykur Rizespor (R)	30	11	7	12	35	42	−7	29	Relegation to Turkish Second Football League
15	Mersin İdman Yurdu (R)	30	8	7	15	21	34	−13	23	Relegation to Turkish Second Football League
16	Orduspor (R)	30	8	4	18	19	38	−19	20	Relegation to Turkish Second Football League

Rules for classification: 1) points; 2) goal difference; 3) number of goals scored.
(C) Champions; (R) Relegated

== Results ==
Home \ Away	ADS	ADA	ALT	BJK	BOL	BUR	ESK	FNB	GAL	GAZ	KOC	MİY	ORD	RİZ	TRA	ZON
Adana Demirspor		0–1	3–0	0–1	2–0	1–0	2–0	1–1	0–0	1–0	1–0	2–1	2–1	0–0	3–2	1–2
Adanaspor	1–0		0–0	1–0	2–1	0–0	3–1	3–3	1–1	2–0	2–0	1–0	2–0	6–1	1–0	2–1
Altay	0–0	3–3		0–0	3–1	2–0	0–0	0–0	0–0	2–0	1–2	3–0	1–0	1–1	3–1	5–1
Beşiktaş	1–0	3–0	0–1		0–0	0–0	0–1	1–0	0–1	1–0	2–1	3–0	4–1	1–0	0–1	2–1
Boluspor	0–0	0–0	0–0	1–1		1–1	0–0	1–0	3–0	3–0	1–0	1–1	1–0	4–0	1–0	4–3
Bursaspor	2–1	1–0	2–0	5–0	3–1		1–0	0–0	2–1	0–1	2–0	1–0	3–2	1–1	1–1	1–0
Eskişehirspor	1–0	1–0	0–0	0–0	1–0	1–0		0–1	1–0	0–0	0–1	2–0	1–0	3–1	0–0	0–0
Fenerbahçe	2–2	1–0	2–1	1–0	5–0	3–0	1–0		0–1	0–1	0–0	1–1	1–0	2–3	1–2	1–1
Galatasaray	0–2	1–3	0–0	0–0	3–2	2–0	4–1	1–0		0–0	1–0	0–0	3–0	2–2	2–1	1–0
Gaziantepspor	1–0	1–0	1–1	1–1	1–1	2–1	0–0	3–1	1–0		1–0	1–0	4–0	2–1	1–0	1–1
Kocaelispor	0–1	0–0	3–0	3–2	4–2	2–1	1–1	1–1	1–0	0–0		3–2	1–0	4–1	2–2	1–0
Mersin İdman Yurdu	1–0	2–2	2–0	0–1	1–0	1–0	0–2	1–1	0–1	0–0	3–1		1–0	2–1	0–0	2–0
Orduspor	3–0	2–0	1–0	1–0	1–1	0–1	0–0	0–1	0–1	1–0	1–1	1–0		2–1	0–2	2–1
Rizespor	0–0	1–0	2–1	1–3	3–0	2–0	1–1	2–1	0–1	2–0	2–1	1–0	0–0		1–0	3–0
Trabzonspor	3–0	1–0	4–0	1–0	1–1	2–1	1–0	0–0	3–0	1–0	2–1	3–0	2–0	2–1		2–0
Zonguldakspor	2–0	3–0	1–1	1–0	0–1	3–0	2–1	1–0	2–1	2–0	0–0	2–0	3–0	2–0	1–1	

Source: TFF, Mackolik
Legend: Blue = home team win; Yellow = draw; Red = away team win.
