= 1974–75 1.Lig =

17th season of top-tier Turkish football

1.Lig
- Season: 1974–75
- Champions: Fenerbahçe; 8th title
- Relegated: Samsunspor; Kayserispor
- European Cup: Fenerbahçe
- Cup Winners' Cup: Beşiktaş
- UEFA Cup: Galatasaray; Eskişehirspor
- Matches: 240
- Goals: 442 (1.84 per match)
- Top goalscorer: Ömer Kaner (14 goals)

Statistics of the Turkish First Football League for the 1974–75 season.

== Overview ==
It was contested by 16 teams, and Fenerbahçe S.K. won the championship.

== League table ==
Pos	Team	Pld	W	D	L	GF	GA	GD	Pts	Qualification or relegation
1	Fenerbahçe (C)	30	15	13	2	43	18	+25	43	Qualification to European Cup first round
2	Galatasaray	30	16	6	8	36	24	+12	38	Qualification to UEFA Cup first round
3	Eskişehirspor	30	11	13	6	27	19	+8	35	Qualification to UEFA Cup first round
4	Adanaspor	30	12	9	9	38	25	+13	33	Invitation to Balkans Cup
5	Beşiktaş	30	11	11	8	29	24	+5	33	Qualification to Cup Winners' Cup first round
6	MKE Ankaragücü	30	8	16	6	26	23	+3	32	
7	Altay	30	9	13	8	27	28	−1	31	
8	Adana Demirspor	30	8	14	8	29	27	+2	30	
9	Trabzonspor	30	9	12	9	19	17	+2	30	
10	Boluspor	30	10	9	11	29	35	−6	29	
11	Zonguldakspor	30	9	9	12	27	34	−7	27	
12	Giresunspor	30	6	13	11	30	35	−5	25	
13	Bursaspor	30	6	13	11	20	27	−7	25	
14	Göztepe A.Ş.	30	4	17	9	23	37	−14	25	
15	Samsunspor (R)	30	7	10	13	24	31	−7	24	Relegation to Turkish Second Football League
16	Kayserispor (R)	30	4	12	14	15	38	−23	20	Relegation to Turkish Second Football League

Rules for classification: 1) points; 2) goal difference; 3) number of goals scored.
(C) Champions; (R) Relegated

== Results ==
Home \ Away	ADS	ADA	ALT	BJK	BOL	BUR	ESK	FNB	GAL	GRS	GÖZ	KAY	AGÜ	SAM	TRA	ZON
Adana Demirspor		1–0	4–1	2–0	2–1	1–1	1–2	1–1	2–0	3–3	0–0	0–0	0–0	1–0	1–1	0–1
Adanaspor	0–1		1–1	1–1	1–1	0–1	2–0	0–0	3–1	2–0	3–1	4–2	1–0	1–1	2–0	5–1
Altay	2–1	2–0		1–0	0–1	3–1	0–0	1–2	1–2	2–1	1–1	2–0	0–0	0–0	1–0	1–0
Beşiktaş	1–1	0–0	1–1		3–0	3–1	1–0	2–1	0–0	2–0	1–1	2–0	1–1	1–0	1–2	1–0
Boluspor	0–1	0–2	3–0	2–0		1–0	3–1	1–1	0–1	1–1	1–0	1–1	1–0	2–1	1–0	3–5
Bursaspor	0–0	0–0	1–1	1–0	0–0		1–0	0–1	0–2	2–1	0–0	3–0	0–0	2–0	0–0	1–1
Eskişehirspor	1–1	1–0	1–0	0–1	3–1	1–1		0–0	0–0	1–0	2–1	2–0	2–1	2–0	0–0	2–0
Fenerbahçe	1–1	0–1	1–0	0–0	2–2	2–2	1–1		0–0	1–0	7–1	2–1	1–1	3–2	1–0	4–0
Galatasaray	4–2	1–0	0–1	1–2	2–0	1–0	0–0	0–1		2–0	2–1	2–0	3–1	2–1	1–0	3–0
Giresunspor	0–0	3–0	2–0	1–1	0–0	0–0	2–1	0–2	1–1		2–2	2–0	0–0	3–0	1–1	1–0
Göztepe	1–1	0–2	1–1	0–1	1–1	2–1	0–0	1–1	0–2	1–1		1–0	2–2	1–1	0–2	1–1
Kayserispor	1–0	0–3	0–0	0–0	0–0	1–0	0–0	0–3	1–1	3–2	1–1		1–1	0–0	0–1	3–2
MKE Ankaragücü	1–0	3–2	2–2	1–1	3–1	2–0	1–1	0–0	2–0	1–1	0–1	0–0		1–0	2–1	1–0
Samsunspor	2–1	1–1	1–1	3–1	3–0	1–0	0–2	0–2	1–2	2–0	0–0	1–0	0–0		1–1	2–0
Trabzonspor	0–0	1–0	0–0	1–0	0–1	2–0	0–0	0–1	1–0	2–2	0–1	2–0	0–0	0–0		1–0
Zonguldakspor	2–0	1–1	0–0	2–1	0–0	2–1	1–1	0–1	3–0	2–0	0–0	0–0	2–0	1–0	0–0	

Source: TFF, Mackolik
Legend: Blue = home team win; Yellow = draw; Red = away team win.
