= 1978–79 1.Lig =

21st season of top-tier Turkish football

1.Lig
- Season: 1978–79
- Champions: Trabzonspor; 3rd title
- Relegated: Boluspor; Samsunspor; Kırıkkalespor
- European Cup: Trabzonspor
- Cup Winners' Cup: Fenerbahçe
- UEFA Cup: Galatasaray; Orduspor
- Matches: 240
- Goals: 486 (2.03 per match)
- Top goalscorer: Özer Umdu (15 goals)

The 1978–79 Turkish First Football League season saw 16 teams in competition. Trabzonspor won the championship.

== League table ==
Pos	Team	Pld	W	D	L	GF	GA	GD	Pts	Qualification or relegation
1	Trabzonspor (C)	30	13	16	1	34	7	+27	42	Qualification to European Cup first round
2	Galatasaray	30	17	7	6	47	17	+30	41	Qualification to UEFA Cup first round
3	Fenerbahçe	30	15	8	7	41	23	+18	38	Qualification to Cup Winners' Cup first round
4	Orduspor	30	13	8	9	31	27	+4	34	Qualification to UEFA Cup first round
5	Diyarbakırspor	30	13	6	11	26	31	−5	32	
6	Altay	30	10	11	9	37	29	+8	31	
7	Eskişehirspor	30	10	11	9	26	24	+2	31	
8	Zonguldakspor	30	11	7	12	28	24	+4	29	
9	Beşiktaş	30	10	9	11	33	32	+1	29	
10	Göztepe A.Ş.	30	9	10	11	30	41	−11	28	
11	Adanaspor	30	8	11	11	33	33	0	27	
12	Bursaspor	30	7	13	10	25	33	−8	27	
13	Adana Demirspor	30	9	9	12	23	32	−9	27	
14	Boluspor (R)	30	9	8	13	33	32	+1	26	Relegation to Turkish Second Football League
15	Samsunspor (R)	30	6	8	16	18	37	−19	20	Relegation to Turkish Second Football League
16	MKE Kırıkkalespor (R)	30	5	8	17	21	64	−43	18	Relegation to Turkish Second Football League

Rules for classification: 1) points; 2) goal difference; 3) number of goals scored.
(C) Champions; (R) Relegated

== Results ==
Home \ Away	ADS	ADA	ALT	BJK	BOL	BUR	DYB	ESK	FNB	GAL	GÖZ	KIR	ORD	SAM	TRA	ZON
Adana Demirspor		0–1	2–1	3–1	2–0	2–1	0–1	0–0	1–0	1–0	0–0	4–0	1–0	1–0	1–1	0–0
Adanaspor	0–0		1–1	0–0	2–0	0–0	2–0	2–2	0–2	1–2	1–2	4–0	3–2	3–1	0–0	2–1
Altay	2–0	2–1		1–0	3–0	1–1	4–0	1–1	1–1	0–0	1–1	6–0	1–1	1–0	1–1	3–1
Beşiktaş	1–1	2–1	1–2		4–1	3–1	2–0	0–0	1–1	1–3	2–1	2–0	0–1	3–0	1–1	0–1
Boluspor	3–0	2–0	3–0	1–1		0–0	1–1	1–0	3–1	1–1	2–0	6–1	1–2	2–0	0–0	0–1
Bursaspor	1–0	0–0	0–2	2–2	1–0		2–1	1–0	1–1	1–0	2–0	5–1	1–1	0–0	0–0	0–0
Diyarbakırspor	4–0	1–0	1–0	2–0	0–1	2–0		0–0	2–1	1–0	2–0	1–0	1–0	2–0	0–0	0–0
Eskişehirspor	0–0	2–0	2–2	2–0	2–1	2–1	1–0		2–0	0–0	1–0	3–2	2–0	1–1	0–0	2–0
Fenerbahçe	1–0	2–1	1–0	0–0	1–0	2–0	5–0	1–0		2–0	2–2	1–0	2–0	2–0	1–1	1–0
Galatasaray	2–1	1–2	2–0	1–0	1–0	5–1	3–0	3–0	1–1		6–1	3–1	4–0	5–0	1–0	1–0
Göztepe	1–1	1–1	1–0	0–0	2–2	3–1	1–1	2–1	1–0	0–1		5–1	1–1	1–0	0–0	1–0
Kırıkkalespor	3–1	2–2	1–1	2–4	0–0	0–0	1–0	1–0	0–4	0–0	2–1		0–0	1–3	0–0	1–0
Orduspor	3–0	3–2	2–0	0–1	1–0	2–1	3–0	1–0	2–1	0–0	3–0	0–0		1–0	0–0	1–0
Samsunspor	0–0	2–1	0–0	0–1	1–1	0–0	1–1	1–0	2–1	0–1	1–2	1–0	3–1		0–1	1–1
Trabzonspor	3–0	0–0	3–0	2–0	1–0	2–0	3–0	3–0	1–1	0–0	5–0	2–0	0–0	1–0		1–0
Zonguldakspor	2–1	0–0	1–0	2–0	3–1	1–1	0–2	0–0	1–2	2–0	1–0	5–1	2–0	2–0	1–2	

Source: TFF, Mackolik
Legend: Blue = home team win; Yellow = draw; Red = away team win.
