= 1983–84 1.Lig =

26th season of top-tier Turkish football

1.Lig
- Season: 1983–84
- Champions: Trabzonspor; 6th title
- Relegated: Adana Demirspor; Adanaspor; Fatih Karagümrük
- European Cup: Trabzonspor
- Cup Winners' Cup: Beşiktaş
- UEFA Cup: Fenerbahçe
- Matches: 306
- Goals: 633 (2.07 per match)
- Top goalscorer: Tarik Hodžić (16 goals)

The following are the statistics of the Turkish First Football League in season 1983/1984.

== Overview ==
Eighteen teams participated, and Trabzonspor won the championship. Trabzonspor would not win another league title until the 2021–22 season. This season was the first season in which no İzmir team took part in the league.

== League table ==
Pos	Team	Pld	W	D	L	GF	GA	GD	Pts	Qualification or relegation
1	Trabzonspor (C)	34	18	14	2	43	14	+29	50	Qualification to European Cup first round
2	Fenerbahçe	34	17	11	6	46	24	+22	45	Qualification to UEFA Cup first round
3	Galatasaray	34	17	10	7	54	29	+25	44	Invitation to Balkans Cup
4	Beşiktaş	34	17	10	7	40	21	+19	44	Qualification to Cup Winners' Cup first round
5	MKE Ankaragücü	34	9	16	9	27	22	+5	34	Invitation to Balkans Cup
6	Sakaryaspor	34	9	16	9	33	34	−1	34	
7	Denizlispor	34	12	10	12	36	42	−6	34	
8	Kocaelispor	34	11	10	13	35	32	+3	32	
9	Zonguldakspor	34	8	16	10	36	46	−10	32	
10	Bursaspor	34	8	15	11	29	33	−4	31	
11	Gençlerbirliği	34	7	17	10	28	34	−6	31	
12	Sarıyer	34	11	9	14	30	43	−13	31	
13	Orduspor	34	13	4	17	27	44	−17	30	
14	Boluspor	34	7	15	12	32	33	−1	29	
15	Antalyaspor	34	10	9	15	34	38	−4	29	
16	Adana Demirspor (R)	34	9	11	14	37	54	−17	29	Relegation to Turkish Second Football League
17	Adanaspor (R)	34	6	15	13	32	41	−9	27	Relegation to Turkish Second Football League
18	Fatih Karagümrük (R)	34	8	10	16	34	49	−15	26	Relegation to Turkish Second Football League

Rules for classification: 1) points; 2) goal difference; 3) number of goals scored.
(C) Champions; (R) Relegated

== Results ==
Home \ Away	ADS	ADA	ANT	BJK	BOL	BUR	DEN	FNB	GAL	GEN	FKG	KOC	AGÜ	ORD	SAK	SAR	TRA	ZON
Adana Demirspor		0–0	1–0	0–2	0–0	1–1	3–2	1–1	0–1	2–2	2–1	0–1	0–3	2–0	0–0	3–0	1–1	1–1
Adanaspor	0–0		0–2	2–2	1–1	0–1	1–1	0–0	1–2	0–0	2–0	1–1	1–1	1–0	2–0	0–0	1–1	2–1
Antalyaspor	2–1	2–1		0–0	2–2	3–2	1–2	0–0	1–1	1–0	2–0	0–0	1–0	3–0	1–2	0–1	0–1	1–2
Beşiktaş	0–0	1–2	0–0		2–1	1–0	3–1	0–1	2–1	0–0	4–0	1–0	1–0	1–0	4–1	1–0	0–0	0–0
Boluspor	0–2	2–1	3–1	1–0		4–0	2–2	2–3	0–0	0–0	0–1	1–0	3–0	1–1	0–0	1–1	1–0	1–1
Bursaspor	1–0	1–0	2–1	1–0	1–1		0–0	0–2	0–0	1–1	1–1	1–1	1–0	4–0	1–1	2–0	1–1	0–1
Denizlispor	5–2	1–0	1–2	1–0	1–0	1–0		0–0	2–1	1–0	1–0	2–1	1–0	2–0	1–1	0–0	0–0	2–2
Fenerbahçe	4–2	1–1	2–0	1–1	2–0	1–0	3–1		1–2	3–2	2–1	2–1	0–0	2–0	2–2	1–0	0–1	2–0
Galatasaray	9–2	3–1	2–1	0–1	1–0	1–1	3–0	1–1		3–0	3–2	2–1	1–1	2–0	1–1	0–1	2–2	1–0
Gençlerbirliği	1–2	1–0	0–1	1–2	0–0	2–2	2–2	0–3	0–0		1–0	2–0	1–1	3–0	0–0	2–1	0–0	2–2
Karagümrük	3–1	2–2	2–1	1–4	1–0	1–0	3–0	1–1	0–4	0–0		0–0	1–1	3–1	0–0	0–0	0–1	6–1
Kocaelispor	1–2	2–1	2–0	1–2	2–1	1–1	3–0	1–0	0–0	0–0	4–0		3–2	1–0	1–0	2–0	1–1	0–0
Ankaragücü	2–0	1–1	0–0	0–0	1–1	0–0	1–0	1–0	2–1	0–1	0–0	1–1		4–0	1–0	1–0	1–1	0–0
Orduspor	2–1	1–0	0–0	2–0	1–0	1–0	2–1	1–0	3–0	2–0	2–1	1–0	0–2		1–0	3–0	0–2	0–0
Sakaryaspor	2–1	2–2	1–0	0–0	2–1	2–1	2–0	0–1	1–3	0–0	2–2	3–1	1–0	1–1		0–0	0–0	5–1
Sarıyer	3–4	3–2	2–2	0–2	0–0	1–1	2–1	2–1	0–1	1–2	2–1	2–1	1–0	3–2	1–0		1–0	2–2
Trabzonspor	3–0	4–0	3–2	3–1	1–0	0–0	1–0	0–0	1–0	3–1	2–0	1–0	0–0	1–0	3–0	2–0		3–1
Zonguldakspor	0–0	1–3	2–1	0–2	2–2	3–1	1–1	0–3	0–2	1–1	2–0	2–1	0–0	3–0	1–1	3–0	0–0	

Source: TFF, Mackolik
Legend: Blue = home team win; Yellow = draw; Red = away team win.
