= Zonguldakspor FK =

Turkish football club

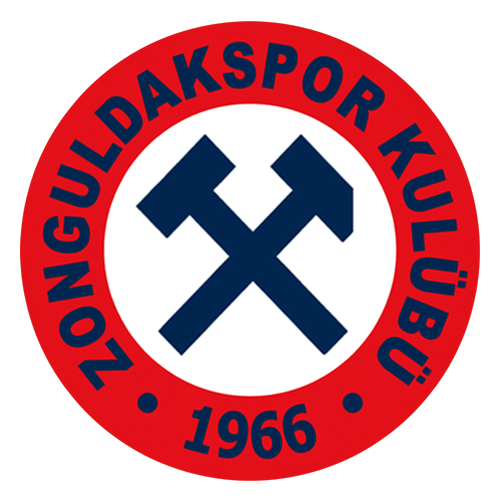
- Full name: Zonguldakspor Futbol Kulübü
- Founded: 1986, as Demir Madencilik Dilaverspor
- Ground: Karaelmas Kemal Köksal Stadium, Zonguldak, Turkey
- Capacity: 13,795
- President: Harun Demir
- Head coach: Ali Çalış
- League: TFF 3. Lig
- TFF 3. Lig: TFF 3. Lig
Home colours	Away colours	Third colours

Zonguldakspor FK, officially Zonguldakspor Futbol Kulübü, is a Turkish professional football club based in Zonguldak. Founded in 1986 as Demir Madencilik Dilaverspor, the club was renamed Zonguldak Kömürspor in 2011 and took its current name in 2024. It competes in the TFF Third League and plays its home matches at the Karaelmas Kemal Köksal Stadium.

The club won promotion to the TFF Third League in 2014 and to the TFF Second League in 2016, where it spent eight seasons. It was relegated in 2024 after a goalless draw between Ankaraspor and Nazilli Belediyespor on the penultimate matchday, a match in which neither side took a shot. The Turkish Football Federation later punished players of both clubs for betting and for influencing the result.

== History ==
=== Founding and amateur years (1986–2011) ===
The club was founded in 1986 as Demir Madencilik Dilaverspor. In the 2010–11 season, it met the original Zonguldakspor in a play-off for a place in the Regional Amateur League and won 4–2. Founded in 1966, Zonguldakspor had spent 14 seasons in the top flight. The defeat sent it down to the Zonguldak Super Amateur League. A few months later, Dilaverspor renamed itself Zonguldak Kömürspor and adopted the colours of the original Zonguldakspor. The original club later took the name Fenerspor.

=== Rise through the leagues (2011–2016) ===
Zonguldak Kömürspor won promotion to the TFF Third League in 2014. In the final round of the promotion play-offs, it beat Zara Belediyespor 2–0 at the Cebeci Stadium in Ankara on 11 May 2014.

In the 2014–15 season, the club reached the promotion play-offs, where it met İstanbulspor in the semi-finals. After a goalless first leg, the return match in Zonguldak ended 1–1 and İstanbulspor went through. Club president Süleyman Caner and head coach Cahit Terzi strongly criticised the referee after the match.

In the 2015–16 season, Zonguldak Kömürspor finished level on 60 points with Düzyurtspor in Group 1 and qualified for the play-offs again. It beat Tire 1922 2–0 away and 2–1 at home in the semi-finals. In the final at the Çanakkale 18 Mart Stadium, it beat Kızılcabölükspor 2–1 in front of about 10,000 spectators to win promotion to the TFF Second League.

=== TFF Second League (2016–2024) ===
Renovation work at the Karaelmas Kemal Köksal Stadium forced the club to play its home matches at the Devrek District Stadium, about 60 kilometres away, during its first season in the Second League. In February 2018, former Galatasaray, Fenerbahçe and Trabzonspor player Fatih Akyel was appointed head coach.

At the start of the 2021–22 season, the club played at the Karaelmas Kemal Köksal Stadium for the first time in about two years. For the opening match against Akhisarspor, both teams walked out through a tunnel built to resemble a mine shaft. The provincial sports director said that the state coal company, Türkiye Taşkömürü Kurumu, had long carried the club's financial burden.

Zonguldak Kömürspor was relegated from the White Group at the end of the 2023–24 season. On the penultimate matchday, it beat Kırşehir FK 3–2 at home, but a goalless draw between Ankaraspor and Nazilli Belediyespor on 28 April 2024 confirmed its relegation. Neither team took a shot in that match, and Zonguldak MP Deniz Yavuzyılmaz alleged that the two clubs had agreed a draw. Club chairman Hakan Hürfikir filed a criminal complaint and asked prosecutors and the federation to investigate.

In August 2025, the federation referred both clubs and dozens of their players and officials to its disciplinary committee for influencing the result and for betting. The committee issued bans in September 2025, and the federation's arbitration board upheld them on 10 September. Club president Harun Demir and Yavuzyılmaz called for the club to be returned to the Second League.

=== Zonguldakspor FK (2024–present) ===
Ahead of the 2024–25 season, the club applied to change its name and planned to keep its existing crest with the new name on it. The federation approved the change in September 2024, and the club became Zonguldakspor FK. Evrensel columnist Alper Kaya noted that it was not the original Zonguldakspor.

In the 2024–25 season, Zonguldakspor finished fourth in Group 4 of the Third League with 57 points. It lost its first-round play-off match 2–0 after extra time at home to Kahramanmaraş İstiklalspor on 30 April 2025.

In November 2025, nine Zonguldakspor players were among those referred to the disciplinary committee in the federation's wider betting investigation. Demir said that the bets dated from 2020 and did not involve the club's own matches. He also said that the investigation had grown out of the club's complaint about the Ankaraspor–Nazilli match. Zonguldakspor finished the 2025–26 season sixth in Group 3 with 46 points, outside the play-off places.

For the 2026–27 season, Zonguldakspor was placed in Group 1 and appointed Barış Şeref as head coach in July 2026. Şeref resigned on 13 September 2026 after a 2–1 defeat to Karabük İdman Yurdu. The following day, the club appointed 38-year-old Ali Çalış, who had taken Fatsa Belediyespor into the play-offs the previous season.

== Stadium and supporters ==
Zonguldakspor plays its home matches at the Karaelmas Kemal Köksal Stadium in Zonguldak. The ground was built in 1940 and holds 13,795 spectators, including 9,500 seats on its open stand. In 2016, the covered stand was demolished as part of renovation work, and a tender was announced for a new stand with 3,000 seats.

In November 2016, A Spor reported that the club's average attendance was higher than the Süper Lig average, in a city of about 125,000 people. In December 2014, about 8,000 spectators attended a Third League home match against Tutap Şekerspor.

== Honours ==
- TFF Third League
  - Play-off winners: 2015–16
- Turkish Regional Amateur League
  - Play-off winners: 2013–14

== League history ==
- TFF Third League: 2014–2016, 2024–
- TFF Second League: 2016–2024
- Turkish Regional Amateur League: 2011–2014
- Turkish Amateur Football Leagues: 1986–2011
