= History of Trabzonspor =

History of a Turkish football club

Trabzonspor, founded in 1967, is one of Turkey’s most successful football clubs. Emerging from a merger of local teams in Trabzon, the club quickly rose to prominence, winning its first Süper Lig title in 1975–76. This marked the start of a golden era during which Trabzonspor broke Istanbul’s dominance in Turkish football, securing seven league titles by 1984, along with multiple Turkish Cups and Turkish Super Cups.

In the following decades, the club faced challenges, including missed championship opportunities and financial restructuring, but consistently remained competitive, often finishing near the top of the league. Trabzonspor achieved a historic seventh league title in the 2021–22 season, ending a 38-year drought. This triumph solidified its legacy as a regional powerhouse and a symbol of pride for Trabzon and its supporters.

Trabzonspor has participated in European competitions and has defeated several established European clubs. The club is based in Trabzon and is one of the major football clubs in Turkey.

== Early Years and Local Rivalries (1923–1962) ==
There were four clubs in Trabzon in Early years : İdmanocağı (1921), İdmangücü (1913), Necmiati (1923) and Trabzon Lisesi. All four clubs competed against each other in the Trabzon Amateur Regional League. in 1923, two of the clubs, İdmanocağı and İdmangücü, held a fierce rivalry that was equal to the Fenerbahçe and Galatasaray rivalry.

The rivalry reached its peak from 1930 on. İdmanocağı won five titles in a row from 1929 to 1933, with İdmangücü besting the record with seven titles in a row from 1934 to 1940. The league was dominated by Lise for six years, before İdmangücü took back the title in 1947–48. More clubs were being founded in Trabzon at the time, including Doğan Gençlik, Akçaabat Sebatspor, Sürmene Gençlik, Zafer Gençlik, Yolspor, and Yalıspor.

The rivalry between Trabzon İdmanocağı and İdmangücü split Trabzon into two, with one side taking the red and yellows (İdmanocağı), and the other taking the green and whites (İdmangücü). The split frustrated the fans as well as the players, which led to some of Trabzon's biggest talents moving to Ankara and Istanbul to play football. These included Hasan Polat and Ali Polat (Gençlerbirliği), Selim Satıroğlu and Ahmet Karlıklı (Galatasaray), Zekeriya Bali (Fenerbahçe), and Nazmi Bilge (Beşiktaş).

== The Merger and the Birth of Trabzonspor (1962–1973) ==
At the start of the 1962–63 season, then president of the Turkish Football Federation, Orhan Şeref Apak, asked cities to combine their football clubs into one representative team, and have them compete in the Milli Lig (Süper Lig). However, due to the rivalry between İdmanocağı and İdmangücü, the city of Trabzon weren't able to merge. City and club officials would meet every morning and night to iron out an agreement, but it never materialized.

Instead, only İdmanocağı, Martıspor, and Yıldızspor merged on 21 June 1966. They began wearing yellow and red kits and competed in the 1.Lig (Second Division). They finished eighth place in their first season, as well as runners-up for the Başbakanlık Kupası. A month later, İdmangücü, Karadenizgücü, Martıspor, and Yolspor merged to form Trabzonspor. Their club colours were red and white.

İdmanocağı opposed the merger and took up a lawsuit against the newly founded Trabzonspor. Ulvi Yenal, head of Physical Education, decided to step in and announce that neither İdmanocağı nor İdmangücü would be accepted into the 1.Lig. This sent a shockwave thru both clubs. Until these two clubs decided to unify into one club, the city of Trabzon would not have a professional representative. In the end, İdmanocağı and İdmangücü decided to merge, along with Karadenizgücü and Martıspor, to become Trabzonspor on 2 August 1967.

Everything was set up, but the club still ran into another roadblock: club colours. The club came to the decision after five meetings with fans and club officials. At first, it was suggested the club should wear the predecessor colours together (yellow-red and green-white), but it was deemed not suitable. It was then suggested that a poll be held, but that was also quickly cast aside. The fans and club officials began to lose patience until Turkish Football Federation General Manager Ulvi Yenal came up with a compromise. He suggested that both clubs, İdmanocağı and İdmangücü, should choose a colour opposite of their own club colours. It was then both clubs came up with maroon and blue.

== Founding Years and the Journey to the Top (1967–1973) ==
This period is remembered as the years Trabzonspor played in the Turkish Second Football League. In 1967, the Trabzonspor was established under the roof of Trabzonspor and started competing in the Second League White Group during the 1967-68 football season. Trabzonspor completed its first year in professional leagues in 6th place among 20 teams in this league, following Boluspor.

In the following two years, Trabzonspor finished 4th in the league. In the 1970–71 season, Trabzonspor finished 8th. During the 1971–72 football season, Trabzonspor competed in the Red Group but missed promotion to the Turkish First Football League (currently called the Süper Lig) by two points. A year later, Trabzonspor experienced the same fate; despite having the same points as the leader (Kayserispor), it finished second due to goal difference and failed to achieve promotion to the Turkish First Football League. In the 1973–74 season, Trabzonspor won the Red Group by finishing six points ahead of its closest rival, Sakaryaspor. Although Trabzonspor lost the championship match against the winner of the other group (Zonguldakspor) in a penalty shootout, it finally earned promotion to the Turkish First Football League. During these years, players like Necmi Perekli, Şenol Güneş, and Cemil Usta, who would later become part of the championship-winning team, started to feature in the squad. Perekli became the league's top scorer twice while playing for Trabzonspor.

== 1973–1984: The Golden Era of Championships ==
Ahmet Suat Özyazıcı took over as manager in 1973. Özyazıcı played for İdmanocağı, the precursor club to Trabzonspor. This period covers Trabzonspor's phase after being promoted to the Turkish First Football League. Trabzonspor was promoted to the Turkish First Football League in 1974. Its first season in this league was the 1974–75 season, during which Trabzonspor finished 9th with 30 points. In addition, during the same year, Trabzonspor reached the final of the Turkish Cup but failed to win the trophy after defeating Beşiktaş 1–0 at home and losing 2–0 in Istanbul.

The 1975–76 football season was the first time Trabzonspor won the Turkish First Football League championship. During this season, Trabzonspor climbed to the top of the league after defeating Fenerbahçe 1–0 in Trabzon and maintained its lead until the end of the season. Under the leadership of Ahmet Suat Özyazıcı, the team secured the championship with 43 points, three points ahead of Fenerbahçe.

From its first championship in the 1975–76 season until the 1983–84 season, Trabzonspor won six league titles. In this period, Trabzonspor missed out on the championship in the 1977–78 and 1981–82 seasons by one point and the 1982–83 season by two points. Trabzonspor secured its sixth league title in the 1983–84 season, finishing five points ahead of Fenerbahçe.

During the 1976–77 season, Necmi Perekli became the first player from Trabzonspor to become the league's top scorer, scoring 18 goals. During this era, Trabzonspor's goalkeeper Şenol Güneş achieved an extraordinary feat by not conceding a goal for 1,110 minutes between 17 September 1978 and 18 February 1979. This record made him the longest unbeaten goalkeeper in Turkey’s leagues and the 15th longest in world football history.

During this period, Trabzonspor also made their mark in European football. The club famously defeated the then-English champions Liverpool 1–0 in the first leg of their second-round match-up in the 1976–77 European Cup, although they were eliminated after losing the second leg 3–0.

Additionally, during this period, Trabzonspor won 3 Turkish Cups, 6 Presidential Cups, 3 Prime Minister's Cups, and the Cyprus Peace Cup. Two of these championships came under the management of Özkan Sümer, while the other four were achieved under Ahmet Suat Özyazıcı. Özyazıcı currently serves as Trabzonspor's Football Advisor, while Sümer served as Trabzonspor's president for a time but resigned in protest after an incident in a match against Fenerbahçe.

== 1984–1996: Transition and Renewed Ambitions ==
From 1984 to the 1994–95 season, Trabzonspor finished seasons in rankings ranging from third to seventh place. Undergoing a new squad restructuring, Trabzonspor, during the tenure of head coach Georges Leekens in the 1992–93 season, fell 10 points behind the leader in the first ten weeks of the season. The team went six weeks without a win, experiencing one of the worst periods in its history.

However, players like Ünal Karaman (who later became captain of the national team) and Tolunay Kafkas were brought into the squad during this time. They became key players in Trabzonspor's starting lineup as the team finished second in the league during the 1994–95 and 1995–96 seasons and re-entered the championship race. During this period, Trabzonspor's most notable achievements were the Turkish Cup titles won in 1992 and 1995, the Presidential Cup in 1995, and the Prime Minister's Cup victories in 1985 and 1994.

== 1995–96 Season: Triumphs, Tragedies, and Missed Glory ==
With the end of the 1993–94 season, Trabzonspor appointed its former captain Şenol Güneş, who had been managing İstanbulspor, as the head coach. Alongside Hami Mandıralı, who is Trabzonspor's all-time top scorer with 218 goals, and Ogün Temizkanoğlu, players like Shota Arveladze and Archil Arveladze were added to the squad. Shota made a significant impact by scoring numerous goals in his first year.

Trabzonspor lost the championship to Beşiktaş in the 1994–95 season but managed to win both the Turkish Cup and the Presidential Cup. In the 1995–96 season, where Shota became the league's top scorer, Trabzonspor missed the championship once again. On 5 May 1996, in a match held at Hüseyin Avni Aker Stadium, Trabzonspor took a 1–0 lead but lost 2–1 to Fenerbahçe after goals from Oğuz Çetin in the 55th minute and Aykut Kocaman in the 82nd minute. This loss is considered a significant trauma in Trabzonspor's history. Following the match, a fan in Görele, Giresun, deeply saddened by the loss, committed suicide, leaving a note that read: “Wrap me in a Trabzonspor flag when I am buried. No one is responsible for my death. If I were to be reborn, I would want to be born as a Trabzonspor fan again.

Despite failing to win the championship, Trabzonspor managed to secure the Prime Minister's Cup at the end of the season. However, the effects of the missed championship lingered into the next season. After an away match against Kocaelispor, fans were involved in a fatal car accident on their way back. At the funeral of the victims, players faced significant backlash, and captain Ogün Temizkanoğlu was attacked by fans.

By the early 2000s, the team underwent significant changes. Players like Abdullah Ercan, Ogün Temizkanoğlu, and Tolunay Kafkas were let go, and expensive signings like Rune Lange were made. However, players such as Rune Lange, Kevin David Campbell, and Jean-Jacques Missé-Missé failed to deliver successful performances for Trabzonspor. In some cases, such as with Rune Lange, disputes arose, leading to cases being taken to FIFA.

== 2000s: Struggles, Restructuring, and Revival ==
The early 2000s were one of the most unsuccessful periods in Trabzonspor's history. In the 2001–02 season, the team finished 14th in the league, marking the worst season in its history. Additionally, this season went down in history as the one where Trabzonspor conceded the most goals and suffered the most defeats.

Following this season, the then-president Özkan Sümer decided to restructure the team by appointing Samet Aybaba as the head coach. This restructuring included bringing in foreign players such as Ibrahim Yattara, who became the club's top assist provider and the foreign player with the longest tenure, and Michael Petković, as well as homegrown talents like Gökdeniz Karadeniz and Fatih Tekke. This foundation led Trabzonspor to win the Turkish Cup in the 2002–03 and 2003–04 seasons and contend for the championship in the 2003–04 and 2004–05 seasons, finishing second behind Fenerbahçe in both seasons.

After Trabzonspor lost a match to Fenerbahçe in Istanbul in 2004, Trabzonspor fans accused referee Cem Papila of making incorrect decisions that cost the team the championship. Fans organized a protest in Trabzon attended by 40,000 people, calling for the resignation of the Federation and the Central Referee Board. Following the backlash, Cem Papila announced his retirement from refereeing.

Under the presidency of Nuri Albayrak, Trabzonspor sought success by signing high-profile foreign players like Marcelinho and Kiki Musampa. However, these players struggled to adapt to the team.

In 2008, Sadri Şener was elected as president. Following this, a large part of the squad was replaced, with Ersun Yanal being appointed as head coach and 25 new players being transferred. With these transfers, Trabzonspor competed for the championship until the final weeks of the 2008–09 season, ultimately finishing third.

== 2010s: Challenges, Rebuilding, and Financial Restructuring ==
The Trabzonspor management appointed Hugo Broos as head coach for the following season, but his contract was terminated after poor results. Şenol Güneş was then hired as his replacement. With Güneş at the helm, the team achieved positive results. In the 2009–10 season, Trabzonspor won both the Turkish Super Cup and the Turkish Cup. Trabzonspor finished the first half of the 2010–11 season as league leaders. However, despite finishing the season with 82 points, Trabzonspor lost the title to Fenerbahçe on goal difference. That season, following the match-fixing case involving Fenerbahçe on 3 July 2011, Trabzonspor requested that the championship trophy be awarded to them. During the same period, UEFA banned Fenerbahçe from European competitions for two years. Trabzonspor decided to take the matter to CAS and FIFA. While this process was ongoing, Trabzonspor lost several key players and entered the 2011–12 season with a significantly different squad, finishing in third place.

In the 2012–13 season, Sadri Şener was succeeded by İbrahim Hacıosmanoğlu as club president. After losing 3–1 to Elazığspor in the 19th week of the season, Şenol Güneş, who had been managing the team since 2009, resigned, and Tolunay Kafkas was appointed as interim head coach until the end of the season. The team performed poorly compared to the previous season, finishing ninth in the league, but qualified for the UEFA Europa League by reaching the Turkish Cup final, where they lost 1–0 to Fenerbahçe.

In the 2013–14 season, Trabzonspor signed players such as Florent Malouda and José Bosingwa and appointed Mustafa Reşit Akçay as head coach. Despite struggling in the league, Trabzonspor successfully qualified for the UEFA Europa League group stage by defeating Derry City, Dinamo Minsk, and Kukesi in the qualifying rounds. In the group stage, they were drawn with Lazio, Apollon Limassol, and Legia Warsaw, finishing as undefeated group leaders with 14 points. However, they were eliminated in the Round of 32 by Juventus, losing both legs 2–0. After Akçay resigned in the 20th week of the league, Hami Mandıralı was appointed as head coach. Trabzonspor finished fourth, qualifying for the Europa League once again.

Before the 2014–15 season, Vahid Halilhodžić was appointed as head coach, and the squad underwent significant changes, with nearly 20 new signings, including Óscar Cardozo, Mehmet Ekici, Kévin Constant, Waris, and Yatabare. However, poor results led to Halilhodžić's dismissal after the 10th week, and Ersun Yanal returned for a second stint. Under Yanal's management, Trabzonspor performed better, advancing to the Europa League Round of 32 by finishing second in a group that included Metalist Kharkiv, Lokeren, and Legia Warsaw. They were eliminated by Napoli, losing 4–0 at home and 1–0 in the return leg. Trabzonspor finished the league in fifth place, and Yanal departed at the end of the season.

Before the 2015–16 season, Shota Arveladze was appointed head coach but resigned after an 11th-week loss to İstanbul Başakşehir. On 6 December 2015, Muharrem Usta was elected president. The team was temporarily managed by Sadi Tekelioğlu until the mid-season break, after which Hami Mandıralı returned as head coach. During this period, Trabzonspor faced financial difficulties and disputes over player payments, leading to some foreign players leaving before the season ended. The team finished the league with 12 wins, 4 draws, and 18 losses, totaling 40 points and finishing in 12th place. They suffered their worst defeat in league history, losing 7–0 to Antalyaspor in the 33rd week. Hami Mandıralı resigned after the match.

Ahead of the 2016–17 season, Ersun Yanal returned for his third stint as head coach. Under the leadership of president Muharrem Usta, Trabzonspor initiated a restructuring process ahead of the club's 50th anniversary. Many players were released, and due to financial restrictions imposed by UEFA, the club focused on signing low-cost players. After a disappointing first half of the season, finishing 13th with 18 points, Trabzonspor strengthened their squad during the mid-season break. Moving to their new stadium, Şenol Güneş Stadium, the team improved significantly, climbing to fifth place. Trabzonspor played their first official match at Şenol Güneş Stadium on 29 January 2017, defeating Gaziantepspor 4–0, with Fabian Castillo scoring the first goal in the new stadium's history. Trabzonspor suffered their first defeat at the new stadium on 8 April 2017, losing 4–3 to Beşiktaş.

In the 2018–19 season, Ahmet Ağaoğlu was elected as president, highlighting the club's financial difficulties. Under Ağaoğlu's leadership, the club restructured its debts, and Ünal Karaman, a club legend from the 1990s, was appointed head coach. Despite injuries to key players and a transfer ban during the mid-season window, the team finished fourth, five points behind champions Galatasaray. However, a crisis between Karaman and Ağaoğlu at the end of 2019 led to Karaman's resignation, and assistant coach Hüseyin Çimşir, who had previously won the league with Bursaspor as a player, was appointed as head coach.

== 2020s: Resurgence and the Long-Awaited Championship ==
In the 2019–20 season, thanks to debt restructuring and appropriate transfers, the team became one of the strongest candidates for the championship from the beginning of the season. It experienced its brightest period in the last 10 years, entering the break due to the COVID-19 pandemic as league leaders with 8 weeks remaining. However, just before the season resumed, Trabzonspor was banned from European competitions by UEFA for violating financial fair play regulations. Following the pandemic break, the team experienced a performance drop and on 19 July 2020, missed out on what was its closest shot at the championship in 36 years. At the end of the season, İstanbul Başakşehir claimed the title. After the loss of the championship, head coach Hüseyin Çimşir was dismissed, and his assistant, Eddie Newton, was appointed as the new head coach. That season, despite narrowly missing the Süper Lig title, Trabzonspor defeated Alanyaspor in the Turkish Cup final, securing the trophy for the first time in 10 years, marking their 9th Turkish Cup victory.

Trabzonspor continued with Eddie Newton for the 2020–21 season. However, after failing to deliver the expected performance in the first 8 weeks, Newton was dismissed, and the club signed Abdullah Avcı as head coach. Under Eddie Newton’s management, the team had dropped to the relegation zone, but with Abdullah Avcı’s arrival, Trabzonspor climbed to 4th place and finished the season in that position. Additionally, the Turkish Super Cup, which had been postponed the previous season due to the pandemic, was played on 27 January 2021, and Trabzonspor defeated İstanbul Başakşehir to claim the trophy for the 9th time in their history.

In the 40 matches played in the league that season, Trabzonspor recorded 19 wins, 14 draws, and 7 losses, amassing 71 points to finish 4th. This result earned them a place in the 2021–22 UEFA Europa Conference League starting from the third qualifying round. However, in the 2020–21 Turkish Cup, Trabzonspor was eliminated in the 5th round by Adana Demirspor, losing 4–3 on penalties after a 2–2 draw in regular and extra time.

Trabzonspor made a strong start to the 2021–22 Süper Lig season. On 30 April 2022, Trabzonspor clinched the 2021–22 Süper Lig title, marking their first league championship in 38 years. The club's previous league triumph was in the 1983–84 season, and this historic victory ended nearly four decades of longing for their passionate fanbase. Trabzonspor secured the title after a 2–2 draw with Antalyaspor at their home ground, Şenol Güneş Sports Complex. The result ensured an unassailable lead at the top of the table with three matches remaining in the season.

Under the management of Abdullah Avcı, Trabzonspor demonstrated consistent performances throughout the season, maintaining a dominant position in the league standings. Their balanced squad and tactical discipline were instrumental in their success, with standout performances from key players such as Anastasios Bakasetas and Anthony Nwakaeme.

The championship victory was met with widespread celebrations across Trabzon and among the club's global supporters. Fans filled the streets of Trabzon, waving the club's maroon-and-blue colors and chanting songs of triumph. The occasion underscored the significance of the title, which reaffirmed Trabzonspor's status as one of Turkey's most historic and successful football clubs.

This title was Trabzonspor's seventh Süper Lig championship and their first since the introduction of the modern Turkish league format. It also marked a significant moment in Turkish football history, breaking the Istanbul-based dominance of Beşiktaş, Fenerbahçe, and Galatasaray, which had collectively won every league title since 1984.
