= List of Trabzonspor (football team) managers =

Since its establishment, Trabzonspor has been led by numerous managers, with a total of 52 different managers serving in this role over the years. Among them, 15 have been foreign managers, including notable names such as Jürgen Sundermann, Werner Biskup, Urbain Braems, Georges Leekens, Gordon Milne, Hans-Peter Briegel, and Eddie Newton. The current manager is Şenol Güneş.

== History ==
The following is a list of Trabzonspor managers since the club’s establishment. Over the years, several managers have contributed to the team’s domestic and international successes. Ahmet Suat Özyazıcı was the first manager to secure a major trophy for the club, winning the Süper Lig title during the 1975–76 season. Trabzonspor’s golden era, spanning the late 1970s and early 1980s, featured managers like Ahmet Suat Özyazıcı and Özkan Sümer, who won multiple titles, including the Süper Lig, Turkish Cup, and Turkish Super Cup.

In more recent years, notable figures such as Şenol Güneş, Eddie Newton, and Abdullah Avcı have continued the club’s winning tradition, contributing to Trabzonspor’s legacy as one of Turkey’s most successful football clubs. This list details the managers, their achievements, and their tenures, emphasizing those who secured silverware for the team.

== Managers ==
As of 14 January 2025.

No.	Manager	Trabzonspor	M	W	D	L	Win %
1	(Turkey) Halil Özyazıcı	9 August 1967 – 31 December 1967	0	0	0	0	0.00%
2	(Turkey) Erdoğan Gürhan	5 July 1968 – 30 June 1969	0	0	0	0	0.00%
3	(Turkey) Ahmet Karlıklı	1 July 1969 – 31 December 1969	0	0	0	0	0.00%
4	(Turkey) Kamuran Soykıray	1 July 1971 – 30 June 1972	0	0	0	0	0.00%
5	(Turkey) Mustafa Ertan	1 July 1972 – 26 March 1973	0	0	0	0	0.00%
6	(Turkey) Ahmet Suat Özyazıcı	26 March 1973 – 30 June 1975	1	0	0	1	0.00%
7	(Turkey) Şükrü Ersoy	1 July 1975 – 31 December 1975	0	0	0	0	0.00%
8	(Turkey) Ahmet Suat Özyazıcı	1 January 1976 – 30 June 1978	10	7	1	2	70.00%
9	(Turkey) Özkan Sümer	1 July 1978 – 30 June 1979	1	1	0	0	100.00%
10	(Turkey) Ahmet Suat Özyazıcı	6 July 1979 – 30 June 1980	3	1	0	2	33.33%
11	(Turkey) Özkan Sümer	9 July 1980 – 30 June 1981	3	1	0	2	33.33%
12	(Turkey) Ahmet Suat Özyazıcı	6 August 1981 – 30 June 1984	12	3	3	6	25.00%
13	(Turkey) Özkan Sümer	1 July 1984 – 9 April 1985	3	1	1	1	33.33%
14	(Turkey) İlyas Akçay	9 April 1985 – 30 June 1985	0	0	0	0	0.00%
15	(Germany) Jürgen Sundermann	1 July 1985 – 14 March 1986	10	4	3	3	40.00%
16	(Turkey) Ahmet Suat Özyazıcı	17 March 1986 – 18 November 1987	49	23	17	9	46.94%
17	(Turkey) Metin Türel	1 November 1987 – 30 June 1988	30	13	7	10	43.33%
18	(Germany) Werner Biskup	1 July 1988 – 6 September 1988	3	2	0	1	66.67%
19	(Turkey) Şenol Güneş	13 September 1988 – 17 August 1989	36	19	6	11	52.78%
20	(Belgium) Urbain Braems	1 July 1989 – 30 June 1990	38	23	8	7	60.53%
21	(Netherlands) Theo Laseroms	1 July 1989 – 30 June 1990	0	0	0	0	0.00%
22	(Turkey) Özkan Sümer	16 July 1990 – 30 June 1991	37	18	10	9	48.65%
23	(Belgium) Urbain Braems	1 July 1991 – 30 June 1992	42	23	9	10	54.76%
24	(Belgium) Georges Leekens	1 July 1992 – 24 September 1993	43	23	13	7	53.49%
25	(Turkey) Şenol Güneş	23 September 1993 – 3 February 1997	150	98	27	25	65.33%
26	(Turkey) Yılmaz Vural	3 February 1997 – 9 October 1997	32	19	7	6	59.38%
27	(Turkey) Özkan Sümer	16 October 1997 – 4 March 1998	17	9	6	2	52.94%
28	(Turkey) Ali Kemal Denizci	4 March 1998 – 30 June 1998	11	5	3	3	45.45%
29	(England) Gordon Milne	2 July 1998 – 30 June 1999	37	18	7	12	48.65%
30	(Turkey) Ahmet Suat Özyazıcı	1 January 1999 – 30 December 1999	18	6	6	6	33.33%
31	(Turkey) Giray Bulak	6 January 2000 – 1 January 2001	40	20	8	12	50.00%
32	(Turkey) Sadi Tekelioğlu	19 October 2001 – 9 November 2001	28	12	4	12	42.86%
33	(Germany) Hans-Peter Briegel	9 November 2001 – 30 June 2002	26	9	5	12	34.62%
34	(Turkey) Samet Aybaba	1 July 2002 – 4 December 2003	55	26	17	12	47.27%
35	(Turkey) Turgay Semercioğlu	11 April 2003 – 5 February 2004	6	3	3	0	50.00%
36	(Turkey) Ziya Doğan	5 February 2004 – 17 January 2005	41	29	7	5	70.73%
37	(Turkey) Şenol Güneş	26 October 2005 – 17 October 2005	29	19	3	7	65.52%
38	(Turkey) Orhan Çıkırıkçı	26 October 2005 – 7 October 2005	1	0	0	1	0.00%
39	(Bosnia and Herzegovina) Vahid Halilhodžić	7 October 2005 – 30 June 2006	30	15	5	10	50.00%
40	(Brazil) Sebastiao Lazaroni	1 July 2006 – 7 September 2006	6	2	2	2	33.33%
41	(Turkey) Ziya Doğan	7 September 2006 – 22 October 2007	53	21	17	15	39.62%
42	(Turkey) Ersun Yanal	27 December 2007 – 27 November 2009	62	30	12	20	48.39%
43	(Turkey) Ahmet Özen	28 November 2009 – 30 June 2009	5	4	0	1	80.00%
44	(Belgium) Hugo Broos	1 July 2009 – 24 November 2009	15	6	3	6	40.00%
45	(Turkey) Şenol Güneş	4 December 2009 – 29 January 2013	145	72	39	34	49.66%
46	(Turkey) Tolunay Kafkas	29 January 2013 – 30 June 2013	20	9	1	10	45.00%
47	(Turkey) Mustafa Reşit Akçay	1 July 2013 – 10 February 2014	33	17	8	8	51.52%
48	(Turkey) Hami Mandıralı	10 February 2014 – 30 June 2014	16	6	6	4	37.50%
49	(Bosnia and Herzegovina) Vahid Halilhodžić	15 July 2014 – 8 November 2014	12	3	7	2	25.00%
50	(Turkey) Ersun Yanal	12 May 2014 – 2 July 2015	36	17	9	10	47.22%
51	(Georgia (country)) Shota Arveladze	3 July 2015 – 11 November 2015	15	6	3	6	40.00%
52	(Turkey) Sadi Tekelioğlu	21 January 2016 – 13 May 2016	12	8	1	3	66.67%
53	(Turkey) Hami Mandıralı	13 May 2016 – 20 May 2016	17	5	1	11	29.41%
54	(Turkey) Taner Yılmaz	14 May 2016 – 20 May 2016	1	0	1	0	0.00%
55	(Turkey) Ersun Yanal	1 July 2016 – 16 October 2017	50	20	15	15	40.00%
56	(Turkey) Rıza Çalımbay	18 October 2017 – 30 June 2018	31	16	8	7	51.61%
57	(Turkey) Ünal Karaman	1 July 2018 – 30 December 2019	69	34	18	17	49.28%
58	(Turkey) Hüseyin Çimşir	2 January 2020 – 20 July 2020	21	12	7	2	57.14%
59	(England) Eddie Newton	20 July 2020 – 31 October 2020	9	3	2	4	33.33%
60	(Turkey) İhsan Derelioğlu	31 October 2020 – 8 November 2020	1	0	0	1	0.00%
61	(Turkey) Abdullah Avcı	10 November 2020 – 8 March 2023	117	65	30	22	55.56%
62	(Turkey) Orhan Ak	8 March 2023 – 4 April 2023	3	1	0	2	33.33%
63	(Turkey) İhsan Derelioğlu	5 April 2023 – 18 April 2023	2	0	1	1	0.00%
64	(Croatia) Nenad Bjelica	18 April 2023 – 11 October 2023	16	8	0	8	50.00%
65	(Turkey) Abdullah Avcı	12 October 2023 – 31 August 2024	44	25	6	13	56.82%
66	(Turkey) İhsan Derelioğlu	31 August 2024 – 2 September 2024	1	0	0	1	0.00%
67	(Turkey) Şenol Güneş	3 September 2024 – 10 March 2025	26	10	7	9	38.46%
68	(Turkey) Fatih Tekke	10 March 2025 – present	17	10	7	3	58.82%

== Honours ==
Rank	Manager	SL	1L	TC	TSC	PMC	Total
1	(Turkey) Ahmet Suat Özyazıcı	4	1	3	4	2	13
2	(Turkey) Şenol Güneş	0	0	2	2	1	5
3	(Turkey) Özkan Sümer	2	0	0	2	0	4
4	(Turkey) Abdullah Avcı	1	0	0	2	0	3
5	(Belgium) Urbain Braems	0	0	1	0	0	1
6	(Turkey) Samet Aybaba	0	0	1	0	0	1
7	(Turkey) Ziya Doğan	0	0	1	0	0	1
8	(England) Eddie Newton	0	0	1	0	0	1
9	(Turkey) İlyas Akçay	0	0	0	0	1	1
10	(Turkey) Yılmaz Vural	0	0	0	0	1	1
