= List of Trabzonspor records and statistics =

Trabzonspor is one of the most successful clubs in Turkish football history in terms of domestic trophies won, with 7 Süper Lig titles, 9 Turkish Cups, and 9 Turkish Super Cups. Trabzonspor is also notable as the first club outside Istanbul to win the Süper Lig, breaking the dominance of Istanbul-based clubs such as Fenerbahçe, Galatasaray, and Beşiktaş. In international football, Trabzonspor famously defeated Liverpool 1–0 in the 1976–77 European Cup, becoming one of the first Turkish clubs to secure a victory over an English champion.

The club’s dominance in the 1970s and 1980s marked a golden era, with six Süper Lig titles won between 1975–76 and 1983–84, along with multiple cup victories. Trabzonspor also holds the record for the longest unbeaten home run in Süper Lig history, showcasing their fortress-like dominance at their former stadium, Hüseyin Avni Aker.

In the modern era, Trabzonspor’s resurgence culminated in their 2021–22 Süper Lig championship, ending a 38-year league title drought. That season, they also recorded their highest-ever points total (81) in the league, led by manager Abdullah Avcı and standout performances from players such as Anastasios Bakasetas and Anthony Nwakaeme.

Trabzonspor is widely regarded as a symbol of regional pride and cultural identity for the Black Sea region. The club has completed numerous domestic doubles, having won the Süper Lig and Turkish Cup in the same season on multiple occasions. Trabzonspor has a large and dedicated fan base, and the club's official colors are claret and blue.

Influential figures in Trabzonspor’s history include legendary players like Şenol Güneş, Hami Mandıralı, and Cemil Usta, as well as celebrated managers such as Ahmet Suat Özyazıcı and Özkan Sümer. Şenol Güneş later became one of Turkey’s most successful national team managers, further enhancing the club’s contribution to Turkish football.

== Honours ==
As of 22 May 2026:

- Süper Lig
  - Champions (7): 1975–76, 1976–77, 1978–79, 1979–80, 1980–81, 1983–84, 2021–22
  - Runners-up (9): 1977–78, 1981–82, 1982–83, 1994–95, 1995–96, 2003–04, 2004–05, 2010–11, 2019–20
- Turkish Cup
  - Winners (10): 1976–77, 1977–78, 1983–84, 1991–92, 1994–95, 2002–03, 2003–04, 2009–10, 2019–20, 2025–26
  - Runners-up (7): 1974–75, 1975–76, 1984–85, 1989–90, 1996–97, 2012–13, 2023–24
- Turkish Super Cup
  - Winners (10): 1976, 1977, 1978, 1979, 1980, 1983, 1995, 2010, 2020, 2022
  - Runners-up: 1981, 1984, 1992
- Prime Minister's Cup
  - Winners (5): 1976, 1978, 1985, 1994, 1996
  - Runners-up (6): 1975, 1990, 1991, 1993, 1997, 1998
- Cyprus Peace Cup
  - Winners (1): 1975
- Uhrencup
  - Winners (1): 2005

== Club ==
=== Matches ===
- All-time record win: 9–0 home to Kırıkkalespor, Turkish Cup, 1974.
- All-time record defeat: 0–7 away to Antalyaspor, Süper Lig, 2016.
- Record win in Süper Lig: 7–0 home to Kayserispor, 1994.
- Record defeat in Süper Lig: 0–7 away to Antalyaspor, 2016.
- Record win in Turkish Cup: 9–0 home to MKE Kırıkkalespor, 1974.
- Record defeat in Turkish Cup: 0–5 home to Galatasaray, 1997.
- Record win in Turkish Super Cup: 4–0 home to Bursaspor, 2010.
- Record defeat in Turkish Super Cup: 0–3 away to Fenerbahçe, 2014.
- Record win in UEFA competitions: 6–0 home to Apollon Limassol, UEFA Europa League, 2013.
- Record defeat in UEFA competitions: 0–7 away to Barcelona, UEFA Cup, 1990.

=== Streaks ===
- Longest winning run in all competitions: 13 matches (1980).
- Longest single-season winning run in Süper Lig: 9 matches (1980–81).
- Longest unbeaten run in Süper Lig: 28 matches (2021–22).
- Longest unbeaten run in all competitions: 33 matches (1980).
- Longest unbeaten run in Turkish Cup: 12 matches (1983–84).
- Longest winning run in UEFA competitions: 4 matches (1976).

=== Seasons ===
- Most goals scored in a single Süper Lig season: 87 goals (1995–96).
- Fewest goals conceded in a single Süper Lig season: 13 goals (1978–79).
- Most points in a single Süper Lig season: 82 points (2010–11).
- Most wins in a single Süper Lig season: 25 wins (2010–11), (2021–22).

=== European Records ===
- First UEFA competition match:
- 3–1 win vs. ÍA Akranes, European Cup, 1976.
- Biggest European win:
- 6–0 vs. KF Vllaznia, UEFA InterToto Cup, 2007.
- Biggest European defeat:
- 2–7 vs. Barcelona, UEFA Cup, 1990.
- Notable win:
- 1–0 vs. Liverpool, UEFA Champions League, 1976.
- 1-0 vs. Inter Milan, European Cup,1983.
- 1-0 vs. Barcelona, UEFA Cup, 1990.
- 1-0 vs. Aston Villa, UEFA Cup,1994.
- 1-0 vs. Inter Milan, UEFA Champions League,2011.
- 4-0 vs. AS Monaco,UEFA Europe League,2022.
