= Trabzon Football League =

Football league

The Trabzon Football League (Turkish: Trabzon Futbol Ligi) was founded as a regional football league for Trabzon based clubs in 1922. In the period from 1924 to 1935, the winners of the Trabzon League qualified for the former Turkish Football Championship. In the following period from 1940 to 1951, the Trabzon league champions qualified for the qualifying stages of the national championship. The city of Trabzon was home to a major rivalry between local clubs İdman Ocağı and İdman Gücü, who fought for the championship title in numerous seasons. The rivalry and relationship between those two teams has been often compared to that of the renowned Intercontinental Derby in Turkey.

After the introduction of the professional nationwide league in 1959, the league lost its first level status. Trabzon İdman Ocağı are the most successful club in the history of the league, holding the record with 12 championship titles.

== Participated teams ==
The following teams participated in the league regularly for at least a few years:

- Trabzon İdman Ocağı
- Trabzon İdman Gücü
- Trabzon İdman Grubu
- Trabzon Lisesi
- Muallim Mektebi
- Necm-i Ati
- Yıldızspor
- Trabzon Ticaret Lisesi
- Martıspor
- Karadeniz Gücü
- Yolspor
- Trabzon İdman Yurdu
- Garnizon İdman Yurdu
- Pulathane Sebat

== Champions ==
| Season | Champions |
|---|---|
| 1923 | İdman Ocağı |
| 1923–24 | Trabzon Lisesi |
| 1924–25 | Trabzon Lisesi |
| 1925-26 | İdman Ocağı |
| 1926–27 | Trabzon Lisesi |
| 1927-28 | Muallim Mektebi |
| 1928-29 | Ticaret Lisesi |
| 1929-30 | İdman Ocağı |
| 1930-31 | İdman Ocağı |
| 1931-32 | İdman Ocağı |
| 1932-33 | İdman Ocağı |
| 1933-34 | İdman Ocağı |
| 1934-35 | İdman Gücü |
| 1935-36 | İdman Gücü |
| 1936-37 | İdman Gücü |
| 1937–38 | İdman Gücü |
| 1938–39 | İdman Gücü |
| 1939–40 | İdman Gücü |
| 1940–41 | İdman Gücü |
| 1941–42 | Trabzon Lisesi |
| 1942–43 | Trabzon Lisesi |
| 1943–44 | Trabzon Lisesi |
| 1944–45 | Trabzon Lisesi |
| 1945–46 | Trabzon Lisesi |
| 1946–47 | Trabzon Lisesi |
| 1947–48 | İdman Gücü |
| 1948–49 | İdman Ocağı |
| 1949–50 | İdman Ocağı |
| 1950–51 | Necm-i Ati |
| 1951–52 | İdman Gücü |
| 1952–53 | Necm-i Ati |
| 1953–54 | İdman Ocağı |
| 1954–55 | Trabzon Karagücü |
| 1955–56 | İdman Gücü |
| 1956–57 | İdman Gücü |
| 1957–58 | İdman Ocağı |
| 1958–59 | İdman Ocağı |

== Performance by club ==
| Club | Titles |
|---|---|
| İdman Ocağı | 12 |
| İdman Gücü | 11 |
| Trabzon Lisesi | 9 |
| Necm-i Ati | 2 |
| Muallim Mektebi | 1 |
| Trabzon Karagücü | 1 |
| Trabzon Ticaret Lisesi | 1 |
