= Cemil Usta =

Turkish footballer

Personal information
- Full name: Cemil Usta
- Date of birth: 10 April 1951
- Place of birth: Trabzon, Turkey
- Date of death: 15 March 2003 (aged 52)
- Place of death: Trabzon, Turkey
- Position: Leftback

Youth career
- 1967–1970: Trabzon Gençlerbirliği

Senior career*
Years	Team	Apps	(Gls)
1970–1978	Trabzonspor	200	(12)

International career^{‡}
1976	Turkey	2	(0)
- * Club domestic league appearances and goals as of 21 March 2019 ‡ National team caps and goals as of 12 May 2019

Cemil Usta (10 April 1951 – 5 March 2003) was a Turkish football player who played as a leftback. A one-club man, Usta solely represented Trabzonspor at a senior level and was a long-time captain of the team in their golden age. Usta twice represented the Turkey national football team. Usta was nicknamed Dozer (Turkish for bulldozer).

== International career ==
Usta made two appearances for Turkey in 1976.

== Death ==
On 15 March 2003, Usta died from a heart attack in his hometown Trabzon. On 20 August 2008, Trabzonspor named their oldest training facility after Usta. On 14 November 2009, a forest in the Zigana Pass was named after him. The 2019–20 Süper Lig season was officially named Spor Toto Süper Lig Cemil Usta season after him.

== Honours ==
Trabzonspor

- Süper Lig (4): 1975–76, 1976–77, 1978–79, 1979–80
- TFF 1. Lig (1): 1973–74
- Turkish Cup (3): 1976–77, 1977–78
- Turkish Super Cup (4): 1977, 1978, 1979, 1980
- Prime Minister's Cup (2): 1976, 1978
