= Samet Aybaba =

Turkish footballer and manager (born 1955)

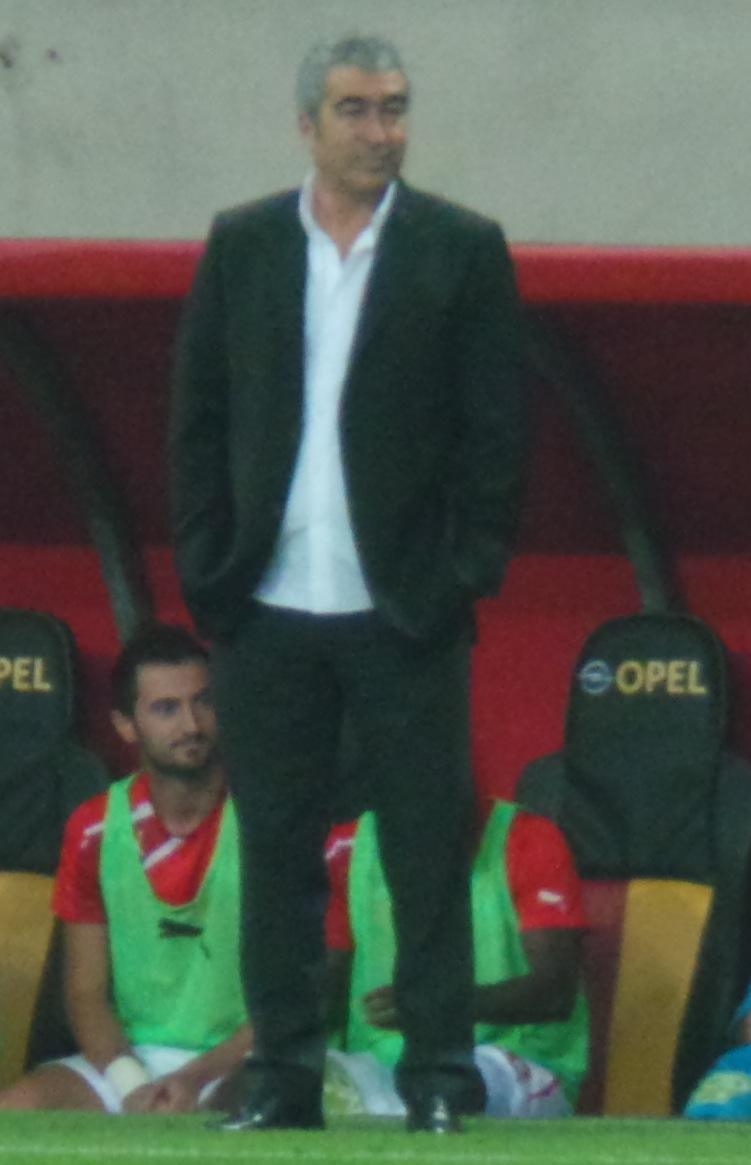
- Samet Aybaba in 2013

Personal information
- Full name: Samet Aybaba
- Date of birth: 3 February 1955 (age 71)
- Place of birth: Adana, Turkey
- Height: 1.79 m (5 ft 10 1/2 in)
- Position: Defender

Senior career*
Years	Team	Apps	(Gls)
1975–1977	Iskenderunspor	36	(1)
1977–1988	Beşiktaş	334	(7)

International career
1973–1974	Turkey U18	8	(0)
1977	Turkey U21	2	(0)

Managerial career
- 1993–1994: Kayseri Erciyesspor
- 1994–1995: Adana Demirspor
- 1996–1997: Kayseri Erciyesspor
- 1997–1998: Ankaragücü
- 1999–2000: Vanspor
- 2000–2001: Gençlerbirliği
- 2001–2002: Gaziantepspor
- 2002–2003: Trabzonspor
- 2004–2005: Ankaraspor
- 2006: Gaziantepspor
- 2007: Çaykur Rizespor
- 2007–2008: Bursaspor
- 2008–2009: Gençlerbirliği
- 2010–2011: Bucaspor
- 2012–2013: Beşiktaş
- 2013–2014: Antalyaspor
- 2014–2015: Adana Demirspor (Director of football)
- 2015–2016: Eskişehirspor
- 2017–2018: Sivasspor
- 2018–2019: Bursaspor
- 2019–2021: Kayserispor
- 2021: Adana Demirspor
- * Club domestic league appearances and goals

Samet Aybaba (born 3 February 1955) is a UEFA Pro Licensed Turkish football manager and former player.

== Career ==
He was born 2 March 1955 in Adana. He began a football career in İskenderunspor. He transferred to Beşiktaş JK in 1977–78 season. He played as defender and midfielder in Beşiktaş JK. He played 334 matches for Beşiktaş and scored 7 goals. He won 2 League Championships, 1 Presidency Cup, 1 Prime Ministry Cup and 2 TSYD Cups and retired after finishing the 1987–88 season. He coached clubs such as Ankaragücü, Kayserispor, Vanspor, Adana Demirspor, Gençlerbirliği, Gaziantepspor, Trabzonspor and Ankaraspor. Aybaba won two Turkish Cups—one with Gençlerbirliği in a final against Fenerbahçe SK and one with Trabzonspor. He also won the Efes Pilsen tournament with Trabzonspor defeating Fenerbahçe SK in the final. He signed with Beşiktaş J.K. as a new coach on 16 June 2012. His contract was terminated on 20 May 2013.

== International career ==
Samet was a youth international for Turkey.

== Managerial statistics ==
As of 4 May 2021

Managerial record by team and tenure
Team	From	To	Record				
Team	From	To	G	W	D	L	Win %
Kayseri Erciyesspor	21 January 1993	8 July 1994	47	14	11	22	29.79
Adana Demirspor	8 July 1994	23 February 1995	23	3	3	17	13.04
Kayseri Erciyesspor	2 January 1996	25 July 1997	56	28	12	16	50.00
Ankaragücü	25 July 1997	22 November 1998	52	18	9	25	34.62
Vanspor	9 July 1999	6 January 2000	16	4	4	8	25.00
Gençlerbirliği	6 January 2000	11 April 2001	52	25	10	17	48.08
Gaziantepspor	8 October 2001	21 June 2002	31	14	7	10	45.16
Trabzonspor	21 June 2002	11 November 2003	53	26	15	12	49.06
Ankaraspor	22 July 2004	10 November 2005	51	17	15	19	33.33
Gaziantepspor	23 February 2006	31 May 2006	17	6	3	8	35.29
Çaykur Rizespor	1 July 2007	29 August 2007	3	0	0	3	0.00
Bursaspor	25 October 2007	4 November 2008	40	16	9	15	40.00
Gençlerbirliği	6 November 2008	31 May 2009	25	8	5	12	32.00
Bucaspor	13 October 2010	8 April 2011	27	7	4	16	25.93
Beşiktaş	16 June 2012	27 May 2013	38	19	10	9	50.00
Antalyaspor	29 June 2013	10 March 2014	34	12	13	9	35.29
Eskişehirspor	19 November 2015	15 June 2016	30	10	6	14	33.33
Sivasspor	24 March 2017	1 June 2018	48	22	11	15	45.83
Bursaspor	1 June 2018	7 April 2019	28	5	13	10	17.86
Kayserispor	10 October 2019	4 January 2021	11	0	5	6	0.00
Adana Demirspor	22 February 2021	Present	13	10	2	1	76.92
Total			671	255	160	256	38.00

== Honours ==
=== Player honours ===
Beşiktaş

- Süper Lig (2): 1981–82, 1985–86
- Turkish Super Cup (1): 1986
- Chancellor Cup (2): 1977, 1988

=== Managerial honours ===
Ankaragücü

- Chancellor Cup (1): 1991

Gençlerbirliği

- Turkish Cup (1): 2000–01

Trabzonspor

- Turkish Cup (1): 2002–03

Sivasspor

- TFF First League (1): 2016–17

Adana Demirspor

- TFF First League (1): 2020–21
