= Trabzon İdmanocağı =

İdmanocağı
- Full name: Trabzon İdman Ocağı Spor Kulübü Derneği
- Short name: TiO
- Founded: January 20, 1921
- President: Oktay Özer
- League: Trabzon Amateur Football League
- Website: http://idmanocagi.org/
Home colours

İdmanocağı or İdman Ocağı is a Turkish sports club based in Trabzon, Turkey. The club had a strong rivalry with another club, İdmangücü, which matched the Istanbul derby between Fenerbahçe and Galatasaray. İdmanocağı were compared to Galatasaray in that period, partly because of this rivalry and partly because of their red and yellow colours. The football department discontinued in 1967 when they were forced by the Turkish Football Federation to merge with İdmangücü and two other local clubs, Karadenizgücü and Martıspor to form Trabzonspor.

They were founded as the first club in the city of Trabzon. Being old and deeply rooted in the city, they played a huge role in the development of various sports in the city. The club also have a women's volleyball department.

== History ==
After World War I, young people in Trabzon were engaged with the development of football in the midst of their postwar struggles. Meanwhile, a high school French language teacher named Burhanettin Kahyaoğlu, and physical education teacher Sami Bey, Hıfzırrahman Raşit Öymen, Tevfik Yunusoğlu, and Ali Kemal Özsubaşı Yusufoğlu led the effort to introduce a group of young people into the venture of founding a sports club in Trabzon. All districts of the city supported the efforts of these young people. The initiative came to a happy ending on 20 January 1921, when the first sports club was eventually established in Trabzon. The colors of the club, which got the name İdmanocağı, were yellow and red.

== Honors ==
- Trabzon Football League (first level)
  - Winners (12) (record): 1930, 1931, 1932, 1933, 1934, 1935, 1937, 1948–49, 1949–50, 1953–54, 1957–58, 1958–59
- Trabzon Football League (second level)
  - Winners (5): 1959–60, 1960–61, 1961–62, 1962–63, 1964–65
- Prime Minister's Cup
  - Runners-up (1): 1966

== See also ==
- İdmanocağı women's football team
- Trabzonspor
