= Ogün Temizkanoğlu =

Turkish footballer

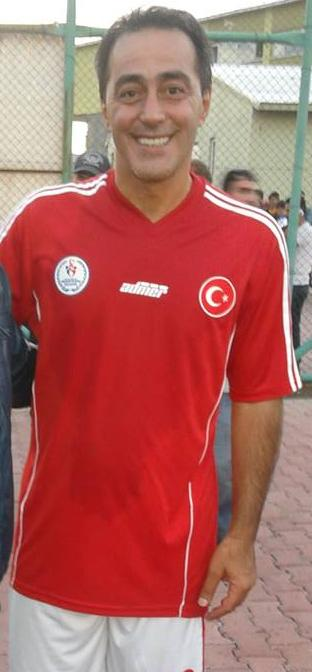
- Ogün in 2014

Personal information
- Date of birth: 6 October 1969 (age 57)
- Place of birth: Hamm, Germany
- Height: 1.81 m (5 ft 11 in)
- Positions: Centre-back; midfielder

Senior career*
Years	Team	Apps	(Gls)
1989–1999	Trabzonspor	243	(33)
1999–2003	Fenerbahçe	99	(12)
2003–2004	Konyaspor	28	(0)
2004–2005	Akçaabat Sebatspor	25	(4)
Total		395	(49)

International career
1990–2002	Turkey	76	(5)

Managerial career
- 2008–2011: Turkey U18
- 2011–2012: Gölcükspor
- 2012: Turkey women
- 2013: Gölcükspor
- 2016: Elazığspor
- 2017: Şanlıurfaspor
- * Club domestic league appearances and goals

Ogün Temizkanoğlu (born 6 October 1969) is a Turkish former international footballer. He played mostly for Trabzonspor and Fenerbahçe as a central defender. He also played for Konyaspor and Akçaabat Sebatspor. He retired after terminating his contract with Akçaabat Sebatspor on 12 August 2005.

He played for Turkey national football team and was a participant at the 1996 and 2000 UEFA European Championship. He is now a football pundit and appears regularly on television.

== See also ==
- Ogün Temizkanoğlu: "Harika bir jenerasyon geliyor" – an extensive interview with Temizkanoğlu (in Turkish)

== Honours ==
Trabzonspor

- Turkish Cup: 1991–92, 1994–95
- Turkish Super Cup: 1995
