= Ünal Karaman =

Turkish politician and former footballer

Personal information
- Full name: Ünal Karaman
- Date of birth: 29 June 1966 (age 60)
- Place of birth: Konya, Turkey
- Height: 1.80 m (5 ft 11 in)
- Position: Midfielder

Youth career
- 1979–1981: Konya Et Balık Spor
- 1981–1984: Konyaspor

Senior career*
Years	Team	Apps	(Gls)
1984–1987	Gaziantepspor	0	(?)
1987–1990	Malatyaspor	91	(23)
1990–1999	Trabzonspor	218	(43)
1999–2002	Ankaragücü	20	(4)

International career
1984	Turkey U-18	3	(1)
1985–1987	Turkey U-21	5	(1)
1985–2002	Turkey	36	(3)

Managerial career
- 2002–2004: Turkey (assistant)
- 2004: Turkey
- 2005–2007: Turkey U-21
- 2007–2008: Konyaspor
- 2008–2009: Ankaragücü
- 2009: Konyaspor
- 2010–2013: Trabzonspor (assistant)
- 2014–2015: Adana Demirspor
- 2016: Şanlıurfaspor
- 2018: Kardemir Karabükspor
- 2018–2019: Trabzonspor
- 2020: Çaykur Rizespor
- 2021: Göztepe
- * Club domestic league appearances and goals

Ünal Karaman (born 29 June 1966, in Konya) is a Turkish politician, professional football manager, and former player who last managed Göztepe.

In the 2023 Turkish parliamentary election, he was elected to the Grand National Assembly of Turkey from the Good Party representing Konya. However, he resigned from Good Party on 20 January 2025. He joined the AKP on February 23, 2025.

== Club career ==
He played for Konyaspor (as amateur between 1981 and 1984), Gaziantepspor (1984–1987), Malatyaspor (1987–1990), Trabzonspor (1990–1999) and Ankaragücü (1999–2002).

== International career ==
Karaman made 36 appearances for the senior Turkey national football team between 1985 and 2002.

== Career as manager ==
He also worked as a caretaker manager for the Turkey national football team in 2004. After serving as the head coach of the Turkey national under-21 football team, he signed up with Konyaspor as a coach in September 2007. Later, Karaman was appointed manager of Ankaragücü after Hakan Kutlu was sacked. He resigned from this position and returned to Konyaspor replacing Giray Bulak, who was recently sacked.

In January 2021, he became manager of Göztepe.

== Honours ==
=== Club ===
Trabzonspor

- Turkish Cup: 1991–92, 1994–95
- Turkish Super Cup: 1995
