= Ahmet Suat Özyazıcı =

Turkish footballer (1936–2023)

Personal information
- Date of birth: 20 April 1936
- Place of birth: Trabzon, Turkey
- Date of death: 18 February 2023 (aged 86)
- Position: Midfielder

Senior career*
Years	Team	Apps	(Gls)
1953–1954	Trabzon Yolspor		
1954–1967	İdmanocağı		
1967–1972	Trabzonspor		

Managerial career
- 1973–1975: Trabzonspor
- 1975–1978: Trabzonspor
- 1979–1980: Trabzonspor
- 1981–1984: Trabzonspor
- 1986–1987: Trabzonspor
- 1988: Trabzonspor
- 1988: Bursaspor
- 1990: Sarıyer
- 1997–1998: Vanspor
- 1999: Trabzonspor
- * Club domestic league appearances and goals

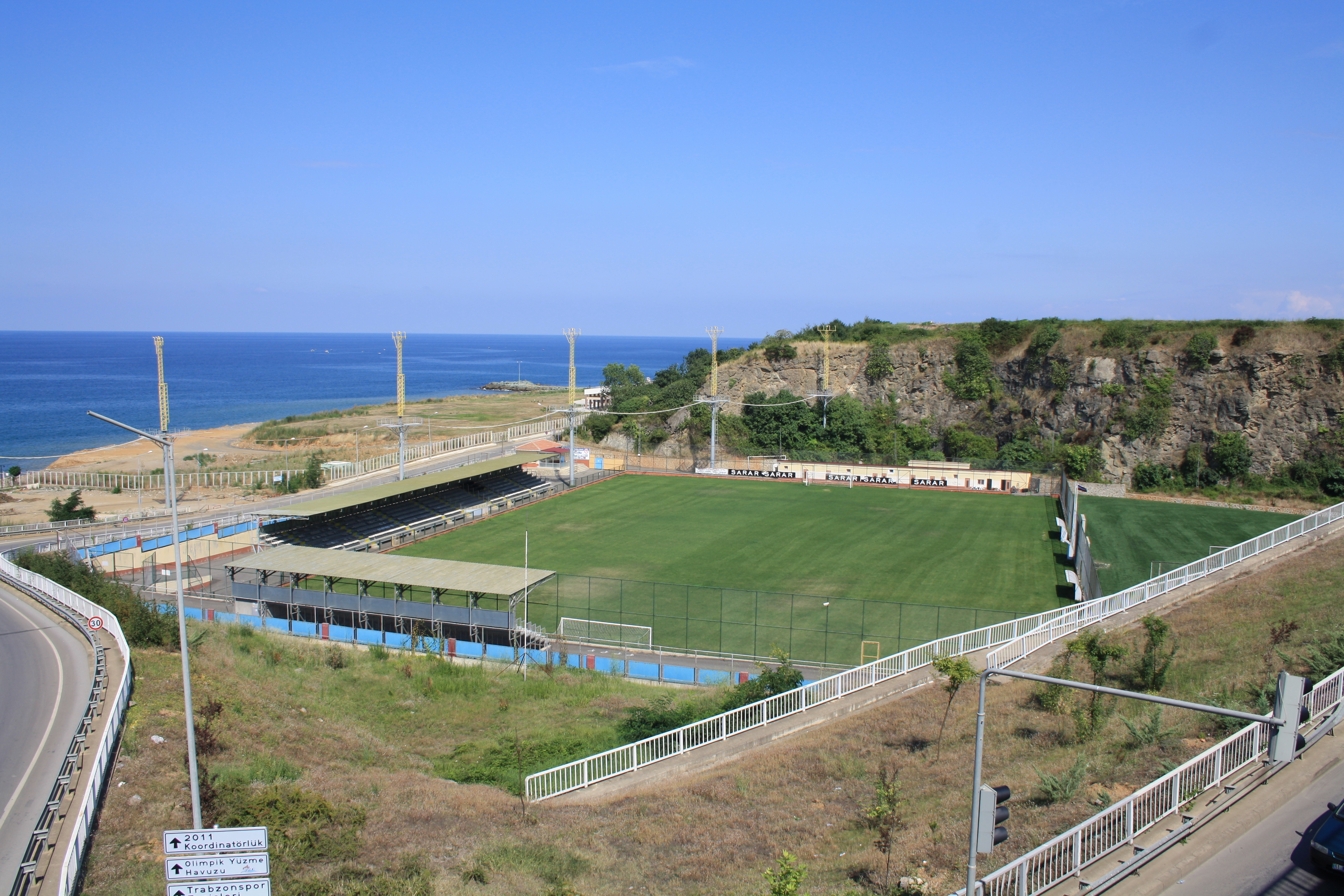
Ahmet Suat Özyazıcı Stadyumu, Trabzon

Ahmet Suat Özyazıcı (20 April 1936 – 18 February 2023) was a Turkish footballer and a successful manager. He competed in the men's tournament at the 1960 Summer Olympics.

== Career ==
Özyazıcı played football at the club İdmanocağı in his hometown Trabzon for several years.

Following his retirement, he became a manager. In the 1975–76 season, he led Trabzonspor to its first league championship title. This was the first time, a team besides the Istanbul clubs Fenerbahçe, Galatasaray, and Beşiktaş (called the "Big Three") to win the Süper Lig. Further titles came with Ozyazici in the seasons 1976–77, 1978–79 and 1979–80. Trabzonspor remained until 2010 the only team to win the league title besides the "Big Three".

Özyazici's Trabzonspor showed success in the UEFA Champions League by beating English giant Liverpool F.C. in the late 1970s. After his successful years at Trabzonspor, he left his post to manage Bursaspor, Sarıyer, Vanspor and Sarıyer G.K. (Istanbul). He is considered one of the most successful managers in the history of Turkish football gaining four Süper Lig titles, a performance reached by Fatih Terim only. He has won three Turkish Cups and several other cups, all achieved with Trabzonspor.

== Honors ==
=== As manager ===
- Trabzonspor
- Turkish Super League: 1975–76, 1976–77, 1979–80, 1983–84
- Turkish Cup: 1976–77, 1977–78, 1983–84; runner-up 1975–76
- President's Cup: 1975–76, 1976–77, 1977–78, 1979–80, 1982–83; runner-up 1983–84
- Prime Minister's Cup: 1975–76, 1977–78
- Turkish Second League: 1973–74
