= Tolunay Kafkas =

Turkish footballer (born 1968)

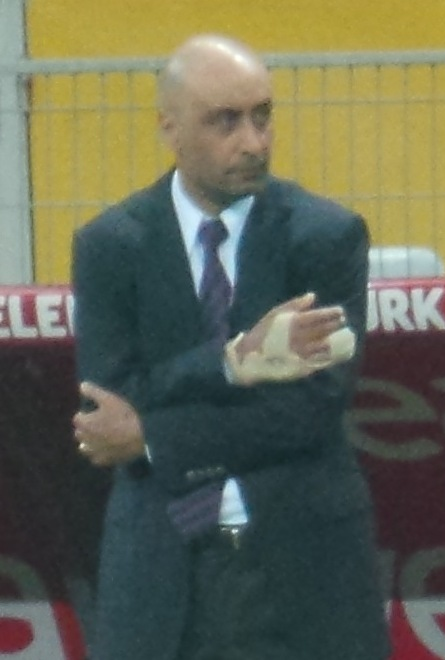
- Kafkas as Trabzonspor manager in 2013

Personal information
- Full name: Hakkı Tolunay Kafkas
- Date of birth: 21 March 1968 (age 58)
- Place of birth: Ankara, Turkey
- Height: 1.88 m (6 ft 2 in)
- Position: Defensive midfielder

Team information
- Current team: Fatih Karagümrük (manager)

Senior career*
| Years | Team | Apps | (Gls) |
| 1987–1988 | Türk Telekom | 26 | (5) |
| 1988–1989 | Keçiörengücü | 33 | (11) |
| 1989–1991 | Diyarbakırspor | 88 | (26) |
| 1991–1992 | Erzurumspor | 10 | (4) |
| 1992–1993 | Konyaspor | 75 | (22) |
| 1993–1997 | Trabzonspor | 143 | (16) |
| 1997–1999 | Galatasaray | 15 | (1) |
| 1999–2000 | Bursaspor | 24 | (1) |
| 2000–2002 | Denizlispor | 48 | (3) |
| 2002–2004 | ASKÖ Pasching | 51 | (1) |
| 2004 | LASK | 10 | (1) |
| 2004–2005 | Admira Wacker | 8 | (0) |
| Total | | 537 | (91) |

International career
| 1994–1998 | Turkey | 33 | (3) |

Managerial career
- 2007–2010: Kayserispor
- 2010–2011: Gaziantepspor
- 2011–2013: Turkey U-21
- 2013: Trabzonspor
- 2013–2015: Karabükspor
- 2015–2016: Kayserispor
- 2016–2017: Akhisarspor
- 2020–2023: Turkey U-21
- 2023: Ankaragücü
- 2024–: Fatih Karagümrük
- * Club domestic league appearances and goals

Hakkı Tolunay Kafkas (born 21 March 1968) is a Turkish professional football manager and former player. He is currently managing Fatih Karagümrük.

== Playing career ==
Kafkas was born in Ankara, he is of Circassian origin. Kafkas played as a defensive midfielder for PTT, Keçiörengücü, Diyarbakırspor, Erzurumspor, Konyaspor, Trabzonspor, Galatasaray, Bursaspor and Denizlispor in Turkey and Pasching, LASK and Admira Wacker in Austria. He retired in 2005.

He made his debut for the Turkey national team on 21 December 1994 against Italy. In total, he made 33 appearances for the Turkey national team scoring 3 goals.

== Managerial career ==
He began his coaching journey in the 2007–08 Season as the head coach of Kayserispor, where he achieved significant success, leading the team to victory in the Turkish Cup and a remarkable 5th place finish in the league with 55 points. This accomplishment earned Kayserispor a spot in the UEFA Cup.

In the subsequent years, Kafkas ventured into coaching roles at other Turkish clubs, including Gaziantepspor, Trabzonspor, and Kardemir Karabükspor, showcasing his versatility as a coach. He also briefly served as the TFF Development Director.

Throughout his coaching career, Kafkas experienced both triumphs and challenges, leaving a lasting impact on the clubs he managed. His tenure at Kayserispor and Gaziantepspor saw notable achievements. Notably, his time at Kardemir Karabükspor was highlighted by a historic achievement, leading the team to their first-ever qualification to the European Cups, which ended with elimination from the UEFA Europa League play-off round by Saint-Étienne after a thrilling penalty shootout. Additionally, Kafkas had the opportunity to coach Turkey's under-21 national football team, contributing to the development of young talents in the country between 2020 and 2023.

On 23 March 2023, Kafkas became the manager of Ankaragücü.

== Career statistics ==
=== International ===
Appearances and goals by national team and year
| National team | Year | Apps | Goals |
|---|---|---|---|
| Turkey | 1994 | 1 | 1 |
| Turkey | 1995 | 14 | 1 |
| Turkey | 1996 | 10 | 0 |
| Turkey | 1997 | 6 | 1 |
| Turkey | 1998 | 2 | 0 |
| Turkey | Total | 33 | 3 |

Scores and results list. Turkey's goal tally first.

List of international goals scored by Tolunay Kafkas
| # | Date | Venue | Opponent | Score | Result | Competition |
|---|---|---|---|---|---|---|
| 1. | 21 December 1994 | Stadio Adriatico, Pescara, Italy | Italy | 1–2 | 1–3 | Friendly |
| 2. | 11 June 1995 | Varsity Stadium, Toronto, Canada | Honduras | 1–0 | 1–0 | Friendly |
| 3. | 2 December 1997 | Denizli Atatürk Stadium, Denizli, Turkey | Finland | 1–1 | 1–1 | Friendly |

=== Managerial statistics ===
As of 30 September 2023

| Team | Nat | From | To | Record | | | | |
| Team | Nat | From | To | G | W | D | L | Win % |
|---|---|---|---|---|---|---|---|---|
| Kayserispor | (Turkey) | 11 June 2007 | 31 May 2010 | 121 | 51 | 37 | 33 | 42.15 |
| Gaziantepspor | (Turkey) | 10 August 2010 | 26 September 2011 | 51 | 23 | 13 | 15 | 45.10 |
| Turkey U-21 | (Turkey) | 26 September 2011 | 29 January 2013 | 13 | 5 | 3 | 5 | 38.46 |
| Trabzonspor | (Turkey) | 29 January 2013 | 31 May 2013 | 20 | 9 | 1 | 10 | 45.00 |
| Karabükspor | (Turkey) | 8 July 2013 | 23 February 2015 | 71 | 25 | 21 | 25 | 35.21 |
| Kayserispor | (Turkey) | 8 July 2015 | 3 March 2016 | 32 | 11 | 8 | 13 | 34.38 |
| Akhisarspor | (Turkey) | 6 September 2016 | 18 March 2017 | 32 | 11 | 9 | 12 | 34.38 |
| Turkey U-21 | (Turkey) | 22 August 2020 | 10 February 2023 | 18 | 6 | 4 | 8 | 33.33 |
| Ankaragücü | (Turkey) | 23 March 2023 | 2 October 2023 | 20 | 6 | 5 | 9 | 30.00 |
| Fatih Karagümrük S.K. | | 13 March 2024 | Present | 13 | 4 | 4 | 6 | 28.00 |
| Total | | | | 378 | 147 | 101 | 130 | 38.89 |

== Honours ==
=== Player ===
Galatasaray

- Süper Lig: 1997–98, 1998–99
- Turkish Cup: 1998–99

Trabzonspor

- Turkish Cup: 1994–95
- Turkish Super Cup: 1995

=== Manager ===
Kayserispor

- Turkish Cup: 2007–08
- Turkish Super Cup: runner-up 2008
