= 1976–77 1.Lig =

19th season of top-tier Turkish football

1.Lig
- Season: 1976–77
- Champions: Trabzonspor; 2nd title
- Relegated: Göztepe; Giresunspor
- European Cup: Trabzonspor
- Cup Winners' Cup: Beşiktaş
- UEFA Cup: Fenerbahçe; Altay
- Matches: 240
- Goals: 442 (1.84 per match)
- Top goalscorer: Necmi Perekli (18 goals)

Statistics of the Turkish First Football League for the 1976–77 season.

== Overview ==
It was contested by 16 teams, and Trabzonspor won the championship.

== League table ==
Pos	Team	Pld	W	D	L	GF	GA	GD	Pts	Qualification or relegation
1	Trabzonspor (C)	30	18	7	5	41	12	+29	43	Qualification to European Cup first round
2	Fenerbahçe	30	12	15	3	31	17	+14	39	Qualification to UEFA Cup first round
3	Altay	30	11	13	6	31	22	+9	35	Qualification to UEFA Cup first round
4	Beşiktaş	30	13	7	10	35	24	+11	33	Qualification to Cup Winners' Cup first round
5	Galatasaray	30	10	13	7	36	26	+10	33	Invitation to Balkans Cup
6	Bursaspor	30	10	11	9	34	30	+4	31	
7	Mersin İdman Yurdu	30	9	13	8	25	26	−1	31	
8	Boluspor	30	9	13	8	32	34	−2	31	
9	Eskişehirspor	30	10	10	10	25	26	−1	30	
10	Samsunspor	30	8	12	10	19	22	−3	28	
11	Orduspor	30	8	12	10	22	27	−5	28	
12	Adana Demirspor	30	6	14	10	21	32	−11	26	
13	Zonguldakspor	30	11	4	15	21	35	−14	26	
14	Adanaspor	30	8	9	13	30	40	−10	25	
15	Göztepe A.Ş. (R)	30	8	9	13	21	31	−10	25	Relegation to Turkish Second Football League
16	Giresunspor (R)	30	3	10	17	18	38	−20	16	Relegation to Turkish Second Football League

Rules for classification: 1) points; 2) goal difference; 3) number of goals scored.
(C) Champions; (R) Relegated

== Results ==
Home \ Away	ADS	ADA	ALT	BJK	BOL	BUR	ESK	FNB	GAL	GRS	GÖZ	MİY	ORD	SAM	TRA	ZON
Adana Demirspor		1–2	1–1	1–0	1–1	1–1	1–1	0–0	0–0	0–0	1–1	2–0	0–0	3–0	0–3	2–0
Adanaspor	1–1		0–3	2–0	1–1	2–0	2–1	0–0	3–1	3–0	2–3	1–2	1–1	1–0	0–2	1–0
Altay	0–0	1–0		1–0	0–0	1–0	0–0	1–2	0–0	1–0	1–0	3–0	2–0	2–1	2–1	1–1
Beşiktaş	4–1	0–0	2–1		0–0	2–0	1–0	1–1	0–2	1–0	3–0	0–0	2–0	1–2	1–0	3–0
Boluspor	1–2	3–1	1–1	2–1		1–1	1–0	1–1	1–0	2–1	1–0	1–1	3–1	1–1	0–2	4–1
Bursaspor	3–0	6–1	2–1	0–0	0–0		1–1	0–0	1–0	3–0	2–0	1–0	1–1	3–1	0–0	2–0
Eskişehirspor	2–0	4–2	0–0	1–0	0–0	1–2		1–0	0–1	3–2	0–0	0–3	2–2	1–0	1–0	1–0
Fenerbahçe	5–0	0–0	1–1	1–1	2–1	3–1	0–0		1–0	3–0	1–1	1–0	1–0	1–0	1–1	0–1
Galatasaray	0–0	3–2	0–1	2–2	1–2	4–1	2–0	2–2		3–2	0–0	1–1	3–0	1–1	1–1	3–2
Giresunspor	0–2	2–0	0–0	0–1	1–1	2–2	1–2	1–1	1–1		1–2	1–1	0–0	0–0	2–0	1–0
Göztepe	2–0	1–1	1–1	1–2	1–0	1–0	2–1	0–1	0–1	0–0		0–1	1–0	1–1	0–0	2–1
Mersin İdman Yurdu	0–0	1–1	3–2	2–0	2–2	1–1	0–2	0–1	0–0	1–0	2–0		1–1	0–0	1–0	1–0
Orduspor	1–0	1–0	1–1	2–1	4–0	0–0	0–0	0–1	0–0	1–0	2–1	1–1		2–0	0–0	1–0
Samsunspor	0–0	0–0	0–0	0–1	1–0	1–0	1–0	0–0	1–1	1–0	2–0	0–0	2–0		0–0	3–0
Trabzonspor	2–1	1–0	3–1	2–1	3–0	4–0	2–0	3–0	1–0	2–0	1–0	3–0	1–0	2–0		0–0
Zonguldakspor	1–0	1–0	2–1	0–4	3–1	1–0	0–0	0–0	0–3	1–0	2–0	1–0	2–0	1–0	0–1	

Source: TFF, Mackolik
Legend: Blue = home team win; Yellow = draw; Red = away team win.
