= Trabzonspor =

Turkish sports club

- Full name: Trabzonspor Kulübü
- Nicknames: Karadeniz Fırtınası (Black Sea Storm); Bordo-Mavililer (The Claret-Blues)
- Short name: Trabzon; TS
- Founded: 2 August 1967; 59 years ago
- Stadium: Papara Park
- Capacity: 41,131
- Coordinates: 40°59′57″N 39°38′45″E
- President: Ertuğrul Doğan
- Head coach: Thomas Reis
- League: Süper Lig
- 2025–26: Süper Lig, 3rd of 18
- Website: trabzonspor.org.tr
Home colours	Away colours	Third colours

Trabzonspor Kulübü is a Turkish professional sports club located in the city of Trabzon, located in northeastern Turkey. Established in 1967 through the merger of several local clubs, Trabzonspor is one of the most prominent football clubs in Turkish history. The men’s football team has won seven Süper Lig championships, making Trabzonspor the first non-Istanbul-based club to achieve this feat in the Turkish league system. In addition to their football achievements, Trabzonspor also operates a women’s football team, a men’s basketball team, and several other sports branches, reinforcing its status as a multi-sport club.

Trabzonspor rose to prominence in the 1970s and 1980s, dominating Turkish football with six league titles between the 1975–76 and 1983–84 seasons. This golden era marked the club as a powerhouse, with Trabzonspor becoming a symbol of regional pride and the only club to challenge the dominance of Istanbul-based teams, such as Fenerbahçe, Galatasaray, and Beşiktaş. During this period, they also won nine Turkish Cups, including a streak of three consecutive league titles in 1978–79, 1979–80, and 1980–81.

After their sixth league title in 1983–84, Trabzonspor endured a 38-year championship drought, marked by near-misses and structural rebuilding. This drought ended triumphantly in the 2021–22 season, as Trabzonspor clinched their seventh league title, led by a strong squad and under the management of Abdullah Avcı. The victory sparked massive celebrations across the city and reaffirmed the club’s status as one of Turkey’s most decorated and respected teams.

The club’s colors are claret and sky blue, reflected in their iconic striped shirts, symbolizing the identity and culture of the Trabzon region. Trabzonspor has played its home matches at the Şenol Güneş Sports Complex (known as Papara Park for sponsorship reasons) since the 2016–17 season, a state-of-the-art stadium that replaced the historic Hüseyin Avni Aker Stadium.

== History ==
=== 1923-1962: early years and local rivalries ===
There were four clubs in Trabzon in Early years : İdmanocağı (1921), İdmangücü (1913), Necmiati (1923) and Trabzon Lisesi. All four clubs competed against each other in the Trabzon Amateur Regional League. in 1923, two of the clubs, İdmanocağı and İdmangücü, held a fierce rivalry that was equal to the Fenerbahçe and Galatasaray rivalry.

The rivalry reached its peak from 1930 on. İdmanocağı won five titles in a row from 1929 to 1933, with İdmangücü besting the record with seven titles in a row from 1934 to 1940. The league was dominated by Lise for six years, before İdmangücü took back the title in 1947–48. More clubs were being founded in Trabzon at the time, including Doğan Gençlik, Akçaabat Sebatspor, Sürmene Gençlik, Zafer Gençlik, Yolspor, and Yalıspor.

The rivalry between Trabzon İdmanocağı and İdmangücü split Trabzon into two, with one side taking the red and yellows (İdmanocağı), and the other taking the green and whites (İdmangücü). The split frustrated the fans as well as the players, which led to some of Trabzon's biggest talents moving to Ankara and Istanbul to play football. These included Hasan Polat and Ali Polat (Gençlerbirliği), Selim Satıroğlu and Ahmet Karlıklı (Galatasaray), Zekeriya Bali (Fenerbahçe), and Nazmi Bilge (Beşiktaş).

=== 1962–1967: merger and birth of Trabzonspor ===
At the start of the 1962–63 season, then president of the Turkish Football Federation, Orhan Şeref Apak, asked cities to combine their football clubs into one representative team, and have them compete in the Milli Lig (Süper Lig). However, due to the rivalry between İdmanocağı and İdmangücü, the city of Trabzon weren't able to merge. City and club officials would meet every morning and night to iron out an agreement, but it never materialized.

Instead, only İdmanocağı, Martıspor, and Yıldızspor merged on 21 June 1966. They began wearing yellow and red kits and competed in the 1.Lig (Second Division). They finished eighth place in their first season, as well as runners-up for the Başbakanlık Kupası. A month later, İdmangücü, Karadenizgücü, Martıspor, and Yolspor merged to form Trabzonspor. Their club colours were red and white.

İdmanocağı opposed the merger and took up a lawsuit against the newly founded Trabzonspor. Ulvi Yenal, head of Physical Education, decided to step in and announce that neither İdmanocağı nor İdmangücü would be accepted into the 1.Lig. This sent a shockwave thru both clubs. Until these two clubs decided to unify into one club, the city of Trabzon would not have a professional representative. In the end, İdmanocağı and İdmangücü decided to merge, along with Karadenizgücü and Martıspor, to become Trabzonspor on 2 August 1967.

Everything was set up, but the club still ran into another roadblock: club colours. The club came to the decision after five meetings with fans and club officials. At first, it was suggested the club should wear the predecessor colours together (yellow-red and green-white), but it was deemed not suitable. It was then suggested that a poll be held, but that was also quickly cast aside. The fans and club officials began to lose patience until Turkish Football Federation General Manager Ulvi Yenal came up with a compromise. He suggested that both clubs, İdmanocağı and İdmangücü, should choose a colour opposite of their own club colours. It was then both clubs came up with maroon and blue.

=== 1967–1973: founding years and the journey to the top ===
This period is remembered as the years Trabzonspor played in the Turkish Second Football League. In 1967, Trabzonspor started competing in the Second League White Group during the 1967-68 football season. Trabzonspor completed its first year in professional leagues in 6th place among 20 teams in this league, following Boluspor.

In the following two years, Trabzonspor finished 4th in the league. In the 1970–71 season, Trabzonspor finished 8th. During the 1971–72 football season, Trabzonspor competed in the Red Group but missed promotion to the Turkish First Football League (currently called the Süper Lig) by two points. A year later, Trabzonspor experienced the same fate; despite having the same points as the leader (Kayserispor), it finished second due to goal difference and failed to achieve promotion to the Turkish First Football League. In the 1973–74 season, Trabzonspor won the Red Group by finishing six points ahead of its closest rival, Sakaryaspor. Although Trabzonspor lost the championship match against the winner of the other group (Zonguldakspor) in a penalty shootout, it finally earned promotion to the Turkish First Football League. During these years, players like Necmi Perekli, Şenol Güneş, and Cemil Usta, who would later become part of the championship-winning team, started to feature in the squad. Perekli became the league’s top scorer twice while playing for Trabzonspor.

=== 1973–1984: golden era of championships ===
Ahmet Suat Özyazıcı took over as manager in 1973. Özyazıcı played for İdmanocağı, the precursor club to Trabzonspor. This period covers Trabzonspor’s phase after being promoted to the Turkish First Football League. Trabzonspor was promoted to the Turkish First Football League in 1974. Its first season in this league was the 1974–75 season, during which Trabzonspor finished 9th with 30 points. In addition, during the same year, Trabzonspor reached the final of the Turkish Cup but failed to win the trophy after defeating Beşiktaş 1–0 at home and losing 2–0 in Istanbul.

The 1975–76 football season was the first time Trabzonspor won the Turkish First Football League championship. During this season, Trabzonspor climbed to the top of the league after defeating Fenerbahçe 1–0 in Trabzon and maintained its lead until the end of the season. Under the leadership of Ahmet Suat Özyazıcı, the team secured the championship with 43 points, three points ahead of Fenerbahçe.

From its first championship in the 1975–76 season until the 1983–84 season, Trabzonspor won six league titles. In this period, Trabzonspor missed out on the championship in the 1977–78 and 1981–82 seasons by one point and the 1982–83 season by two points. Trabzonspor secured its sixth league title in the 1983–84 season, finishing five points ahead of Fenerbahçe.

During the 1976–77 season, Necmi Perekli became the first player from Trabzonspor to become the league’s top scorer, scoring 18 goals. During this era, Trabzonspor’s goalkeeper Şenol Güneş achieved an extraordinary feat by not conceding a goal for 1,110 minutes between 17 September 1978 and 18 February 1979. This record made him the longest unbeaten goalkeeper in Turkey’s leagues and the 15th longest in world football history.

During this period, Trabzonspor also made their mark in European football. The club famously defeated the then-English champions Liverpool 1–0 in the first leg of their second-round match-up in the 1976–77 European Cup, although they were eliminated after losing the second leg 3–0.

Additionally, during this period, Trabzonspor won 3 Turkish Cups, 6 Presidential Cups, 3 Prime Minister's Cups, and the Cyprus Peace Cup. Two of these championships came under the management of Özkan Sümer, while the other four were achieved under Ahmet Suat Özyazıcı. Özyazıcı currently serves as Trabzonspor’s Football Advisor, while Sümer served as Trabzonspor’s president for a time but resigned in protest after an incident in a match against Fenerbahçe.

=== 1984–1995: transition and renewed ambitions ===
From 1984 to the 1994–95 season, Trabzonspor finished seasons in rankings ranging from third to seventh place. Undergoing a new squad restructuring, Trabzonspor, during the tenure of head coach Georges Leekens in the 1992–93 season, fell 10 points behind the leader in the first ten weeks of the season. The team went six weeks without a win, experiencing one of the worst periods in its history.

However, players like Ünal Karaman (who later became captain of the national team) and Tolunay Kafkas were brought into the squad during this time. They became key players in Trabzonspor’s starting lineup as the team finished second in the league during the 1994–95 and 1995–96 seasons and re-entered the championship race. During this period, Trabzonspor’s most notable achievements were the Turkish Cup titles won in 1992 and 1995, the Presidential Cup in 1995, and the Prime Minister’s Cup victories in 1985 and 1994.

=== 1995–96 season: triumphs, tragedies, and missed glory ===
With the end of the 1993–94 season, Trabzonspor appointed its former captain Şenol Güneş, who had been managing İstanbulspor, as the head coach. Alongside Hami Mandıralı, who is Trabzonspor’s all-time top scorer with 218 goals, and Ogün Temizkanoğlu, players like Shota Arveladze and Archil Arveladze were added to the squad. Shota made a significant impact by scoring numerous goals in his first year.

Trabzonspor lost the championship to Beşiktaş in the 1994–95 season but managed to win both the Turkish Cup and the Presidential Cup. In the 1995–96 season, where Shota became the league’s top scorer, Trabzonspor missed the championship once again. On 5 May 1996, in a match held at Hüseyin Avni Aker Stadium, Trabzonspor took a 1–0 lead but lost 2–1 to Fenerbahçe after goals from Oğuz Çetin in the 55th minute and Aykut Kocaman in the 82nd minute. This loss is considered a significant trauma in Trabzonspor’s history. Following the match, a fan in Görele, Giresun, deeply saddened by the loss, committed suicide, leaving a note that read: "Wrap me in a Trabzonspor flag when I am buried. No one is responsible for my death. If I were to be reborn, I would want to be born as a Trabzonspor fan again."

Despite failing to win the championship, Trabzonspor managed to secure the Prime Minister's Cup at the end of the season. However, the effects of the missed championship lingered into the next season. After an away match against Kocaelispor, fans were involved in a fatal car accident on their way back. At the funeral of the victims, players faced significant backlash, and captain Ogün Temizkanoğlu was attacked by fans.

By the early 2000s, the team underwent significant changes. Players like Abdullah Ercan, Ogün Temizkanoğlu, and Tolunay Kafkas were let go, and expensive signings like Rune Lange were made. However, players such as Rune Lange, Kevin David Campbell, and Jean-Jacques Missé-Missé failed to deliver successful performances for Trabzonspor. In some cases, such as with Rune Lange, disputes arose, leading to cases being taken to FIFA.

=== 2000s: struggles, restructuring, and revival ===
The early 2000s were one of the most unsuccessful periods in Trabzonspor’s history. In the 2001–02 season, the team finished 14th in the league, marking the worst season in its history. Additionally, this season went down in history as the one where Trabzonspor conceded the most goals and suffered the most defeats.

Following this season, the then-president Özkan Sümer decided to restructure the team by appointing Samet Aybaba as the head coach. This restructuring included bringing in foreign players such as Ibrahim Yattara, who became the club’s top assist provider and the foreign player with the longest tenure, and Michael Petković, as well as homegrown talents like Gökdeniz Karadeniz and Fatih Tekke. This foundation led Trabzonspor to win the Turkish Cup in the 2002–03 and 2003–04 seasons and contend for the championship in the 2003–04 and 2004–05 seasons, finishing second behind Fenerbahçe in both seasons.

After Trabzonspor lost a match to Fenerbahçe in Istanbul in 2004, Trabzonspor fans accused referee Cem Papila of making incorrect decisions that cost the team the championship. Fans organized a protest in Trabzon attended by 40,000 people, calling for the resignation of the Federation and the Central Referee Board. Following the backlash, Cem Papila announced his retirement from refereeing.

Under the presidency of Nuri Albayrak, Trabzonspor sought success by signing high-profile foreign players like Marcelinho and Kiki Musampa. However, these players struggled to adapt to the team.

In 2008, Sadri Şener was elected as president. Following this, a large part of the squad was replaced, with Ersun Yanal being appointed as head coach and 25 new players being transferred. With these transfers, Trabzonspor competed for the championship until the final weeks of the 2008–09 season, ultimately finishing third.

=== 2010s: challenges, rebuilding, and financial restructuring ===
The Trabzonspor management appointed Hugo Broos as head coach for the following season, but his contract was terminated after poor results. Şenol Güneş was then hired as his replacement. With Güneş at the helm, the team achieved positive results. In the 2009–10 season, Trabzonspor won both the Turkish Super Cup and the Turkish Cup. Trabzonspor finished the first half of the 2010–11 season as league leaders. However, despite finishing the season with 82 points, Trabzonspor lost the title to Fenerbahçe on goal difference. That season, following the 2011 Turkish football match-fixing scandal involving Fenerbahçe on 3 July 2011, Trabzonspor requested that the championship trophy be awarded to them. Trabzonspor decided to take the matter to CAS and FIFA. While this process was ongoing, Trabzonspor lost several key players and entered the 2011–12 season with a significantly different squad, finishing in third place.

In the 2012–13 season, Sadri Şener was succeeded by İbrahim Hacıosmanoğlu as club president. After losing 3–1 to Elazığspor in the 19th week of the season, Şenol Güneş, who had been managing the team since 2009, resigned, and Tolunay Kafkas was appointed as interim head coach until the end of the season. The team performed poorly compared to the previous season, finishing ninth in the league, but qualified for the UEFA Europa League by reaching the Turkish Cup final, where they lost 1–0 to Fenerbahçe.

In the 2013–14 season, Trabzonspor signed players such as Florent Malouda and José Bosingwa and appointed Mustafa Reşit Akçay as head coach. Despite struggling in the league, Trabzonspor successfully qualified for the UEFA Europa League group stage by defeating Derry City, Dinamo Minsk, and Kukesi in the qualifying rounds. In the group stage, they were drawn with Lazio, Apollon Limassol, and Legia Warsaw, finishing as undefeated group leaders with 14 points. However, they were eliminated in the Round of 32 by Juventus, losing both legs 2–0. After Akçay resigned in the 20th week of the league, Hami Mandıralı was appointed as head coach. Trabzonspor finished fourth, qualifying for the Europa League once again.

Before the 2014–15 season, Vahid Halilhodžić was appointed as head coach, and the squad underwent significant changes, with nearly 20 new signings, including Óscar Cardozo, Mehmet Ekici, Kévin Constant, Waris, and Yatabare. However, poor results led to Halilhodžić’s dismissal after the 10th week, and Ersun Yanal returned for a second stint. Under Yanal’s management, Trabzonspor performed better, advancing to the Europa League Round of 32 by finishing second in a group that included Metalist Kharkiv, Lokeren, and Legia Warsaw. They were eliminated by Napoli, losing 4–0 at home and 1–0 in the return leg. Trabzonspor finished the league in fifth place, and Yanal departed at the end of the season.

Before the 2015–16 season, Shota Arveladze was appointed head coach but resigned after an 11th-week loss to İstanbul Başakşehir. On 6 December 2015, Muharrem Usta was elected president. The team was temporarily managed by Sadi Tekelioğlu until the mid-season break, after which Hami Mandıralı returned as head coach. During this period, Trabzonspor faced financial difficulties and disputes over player payments, leading to some foreign players leaving before the season ended. The team finished the league with 12 wins, 4 draws, and 18 losses, totaling 40 points and finishing in 12th place. They suffered their worst defeat in league history, losing 7–0 to Antalyaspor in the 33rd week. Hami Mandıralı resigned after the match.

Ahead of the 2016–17 season, Ersun Yanal returned for his third stint as head coach. Under the leadership of president Muharrem Usta, Trabzonspor initiated a restructuring process ahead of the club’s 50th anniversary. Many players were released, and due to financial restrictions imposed by UEFA, the club focused on signing low-cost players. After a disappointing first half of the season, finishing 13th with 18 points, Trabzonspor strengthened their squad during the mid-season break. Moving to their new stadium, Şenol Güneş Stadium, the team improved significantly, climbing to fifth place. Trabzonspor played their first official match at Şenol Güneş Stadium on 29 January 2017, defeating Gaziantepspor 4–0, with Fabian Castillo scoring the first goal in the new stadium’s history. Trabzonspor suffered their first defeat at the new stadium on 8 April 2017, losing 4–3 to Beşiktaş.

In the 2018–19 season, Ahmet Ağaoğlu was elected as president, highlighting the club’s financial difficulties. Under Ağaoğlu’s leadership, the club restructured its debts, and Ünal Karaman, a club legend from the 1990s, was appointed head coach. Despite injuries to key players and a transfer ban during the mid-season window, the team finished fourth, five points behind champions Galatasaray. However, a crisis between Karaman and Ağaoğlu at the end of 2019 led to Karaman’s resignation, and assistant coach Hüseyin Çimşir, who had previously won the league with Bursaspor as a player, was appointed as head coach.

=== 2020s: resurgence and long-awaited championship ===
In the 2019–20 season, thanks to debt restructuring and appropriate transfers, the team became one of the strongest candidates for the championship from the beginning of the season. It experienced its brightest period in the last 10 years, entering the break due to the COVID-19 pandemic as league leaders with 8 weeks remaining. However, just before the season resumed, Trabzonspor was banned from European competitions by UEFA for violating financial fair play regulations. Following the pandemic break, the team experienced a performance drop and on 19 July 2020, missed out on what was its closest shot at the championship in 36 years. At the end of the season, İstanbul Başakşehir claimed the title. After the loss of the championship, head coach Hüseyin Çimşir was dismissed, and his assistant, Eddie Newton, was appointed as the new head coach. That season, despite narrowly missing the Süper Lig title, Trabzonspor defeated Alanyaspor in the Turkish Cup final, securing the trophy for the first time in 10 years, marking their 9th Turkish Cup victory.

Trabzonspor continued with Eddie Newton for the 2020–21 season. However, after failing to deliver the expected performance in the first 8 weeks, Newton was dismissed, and the club signed Abdullah Avcı as head coach. Under Eddie Newton’s management, the team had dropped to the relegation zone, but with Abdullah Avcı’s arrival, Trabzonspor climbed to 4th place and finished the season in that position. Additionally, the Turkish Super Cup, which had been postponed the previous season due to the pandemic, was played on 27 January 2021, and Trabzonspor defeated İstanbul Başakşehir to claim the trophy for the 9th time in their history.

In the 40 matches played in the league that season, Trabzonspor recorded 19 wins, 14 draws, and 7 losses, amassing 71 points to finish 4th. This result earned them a place in the 2021–22 UEFA Europa Conference League starting from the third qualifying round. However, in the 2020–21 Turkish Cup, Trabzonspor was eliminated in the 5th round by Adana Demirspor, losing 4–3 on penalties after a 2–2 draw in regular and extra time.

Trabzonspor clinched the 2021–22 Süper Lig title on 30 April 2022, securing their first league championship in 38 years. The club's previous title came in the 1983–84 season, ending a long wait for their supporters. The championship was confirmed after a 2–2 home draw against Antalyaspor at, Şenol Güneş Sports Complex. which gave Trabzonspor an unassailable lead at the top of the table with three matches remaining in the season.

Under the management of Abdullah Avcı, Trabzonspor demonstrated consistent performances throughout the season, maintaining a dominant position in the league standings. Their balanced squad and tactical discipline were instrumental in their success, with standout performances from key players such as Anastasios Bakasetas and Anthony Nwakaeme.

The championship victory was met with celebrations across Trabzon and among the club’s global supporters. Fans filled the streets of Trabzon, waving the club’s maroon-and-blue colors and chanting songs of triumph. The occasion underscored the significance of the title, which reaffirmed Trabzonspor’s status as one of Turkey’s successful football clubs. This title was Trabzonspor’s seventh Süper Lig championship and their first since the introduction of the modern Turkish league format. It also marked a significant moment in Turkish football history, breaking the Istanbul-based dominance of Beşiktaş, Fenerbahçe, and Galatasaray, which had collectively won every league title since 1984.

After the 2021–22 title, Trabzonspor opened 2022–23 by winning the Turkish Super Cup, beating Sivasspor 4–0 in Istanbul. Their UEFA Champions League return ended in the play-off round against Copenhagen (1–2 on aggregate), which sent the club into the UEFA Europa League group stage. In Europa League Group H they finished third behind Monaco and Ferencváros, then dropped to the Europa Conference League, where they were eliminated by FC Basel in the knockout round play-offs (1–2 agg.). A run of poor domestic results led head coach Abdullah Avcı to resign in March 2023; Croatian coach Nenad Bjelica took over the following month, and the team finished sixth in the Süper Lig. Bjelica departed in October 2023 and Avcı returned for a second spell; the club placed third in 2023–24 and reached the Turkish Cup final, losing 3–2 to Beşiktaş at the Atatürk Olympic Stadium, thereby securing qualification for the 2024–25 UEFA Europa League.

In 2024–25, Trabzonspor started with an early European exit, losing to Rapid Wien in the UEFA Europa League qualifying play-off (2–2 h, 0–3 a). Head coach Abdullah Avcı then departed by mutual consent at the start of September, and the team was taken over by Şenol Güneş toward the new year. Domestically, Trabzonspor reached the Turkish Cup final but were beaten 3–0 by Galatasaray at the Gaziantep Stadium on 23 May 2025, and concluded the Süper Lig season in 7th place with 51 points.

== Supporters ==
Trabzonspor have one of the largest provincial club followings in Turkey. The fanbase is noted for the slogan “Bize her yer Trabzon” (“Everywhere is Trabzon for us”), reflecting a strong presence across the country and among the Turkish diaspora in Europe.

Home matches are played at the Şenol Güneş Sports Complex, where organised supporter groups produce large-scale choreographies and choreographed chanting. The venue’s all-seater configuration and capacity have helped sustain high attendances during title-contending seasons, including the 2021–22 campaign.

Trabzonspor’s 2021–22 Süper Lig title, which ended a 38-year wait, prompted nationwide celebrations in Trabzon and major cities such as Istanbul and Ankara, as well as gatherings by supporters abroad. Media outlets reported hundreds of thousands participating in parades and late-night festivities, underscoring the breadth of the club’s support beyond the Black Sea region.

== Crest and colours ==
In the long-standing rivalry between İdmanocağı and İdmangücü in Trabzon, the dominant colors were Red-Yellow and Green-White, respectively. It was decided that Trabzonspor’s colors should be different from these and should symbolize Trabzon and the Black Sea region. Various options were considered, including holding a competition to decide the colors, but this idea was later abandoned. Lengthy discussions were held day and night, but no conclusion was reached in the first four meetings. By the fifth meeting, tensions were high, and fans had run out of patience.

During these discussions, the then-president of the Turkish Football Federation, Orhan Şeref Apak, attempted to mediate. At a meeting in the office of the Federation’s General Manager, Ulvi Yenal, representatives from both clubs engaged in intense debates about selecting colors that were distinct from those of the rival clubs. Frustrated with the lack of progress, Yenal demanded that each club representative choose one color. As a result, the İdmanocağı group proposed “dark claret,” while the İdmangücü group suggested “light blue.” Ultimately, the founding members of Trabzonspor agreed on the colors Claret and Blue (“Bordo-Mavi”), which became the club’s official colors. The letters “T” and “S” in the club emblem also reflect the identity of Trabzonspor.

Although a number of theories have been put forward as to why the club colours of Trabzonspor are claret and blue, it has been claimed that they were adopted after the club were sent a set of kits by the English club Aston Villa after their formation in 1967.

=== Kit suppliers and shirt sponsors ===
Period	Kit manufacturer	Shirt sponsor
1980–1981	Admiral	—
1985–1989	Adidas	Grundig
1989–1991	Adidas	Türkbank
1991–1993	Adidas	—
1993–1994	Adidas	Show TV
1994–1995	Adidas	Anadolu Sigorta
1995–1998	Adidas	Vestel
1998–1999	Puma	Vestel
1999–2002	Puma	—
2002–2003	Kappa	—
2003–2004	Kappa	Fly Air
2004–2005	Kappa	Avea
2005–2006	TS Club	Avea
2006–2008	Puma	Avea
2008–2009	Nike	Avea
2009–2014	Nike	Türk Telekom
2014–2016	Nike	—
2016–2018	Nike	QNB
2018–2019	Macron	QNB
2019–2023	Macron	Vestel
2023–2024	Joma	Vestel
2024–2027	Joma	Papara

== Rivalries ==
=== Rivalries with Istanbul’s “Big Three” ===
Trabzonspor has had rivalries with Istanbul’s “big three”: Fenerbahçe, Galatasaray, and Beşiktaş.

The rivalry with Fenerbahçe began in the 1974 Turkish Cup, but it escalated during the 1995–96 season when Trabzonspor lost a critical home match late in the season, surrendering the league title to Fenerbahçe. This moment remains a painful memory for Trabzonspor fans. Tensions reached a boiling point again in the 2010–11 season when the two clubs competed fiercely for the league title. While Fenerbahçe secured the championship, 2011 Turkish football match-fixing allegations led to Fenerbahçe’s European ban, allowing Trabzonspor to make their first UEFA Champions League appearance. The rivalry is fueled by these high-stakes battles, off-field controversies, and the passionate fan bases of both teams, making it one of the most heated in Turkish football.

The rivalry with Galatasaray began in Trabzonspor’s inaugural top-flight season in 1974–75. Over the years, this rivalry has been defined by competitive matches and the contrasting identities of the clubs, with Trabzonspor representing the Anatolian heartland against Galatasaray’s Istanbul dominance. While the intensity doesn’t match that of Fenerbahçe, matches between these two teams remain highly anticipated.

Trabzonspor’s rivalry with Beşiktaş also dates back to the 1970s, with their first league meeting in 1974. While not as fiery as the Fenerbahçe rivalry, the competition with Beşiktaş is characterized by hard-fought matches and the shared ambition to challenge for top honors in Turkish football.

Although Trabzonspor shares rivalries with all three Istanbul giants, the conflict with Fenerbahçe is unparalleled in its history, drama, and impact, solidifying it as the club’s most significant rivalry.

=== Rivalry with Samsunspor ===
The Samsunspor–Trabzonspor rivalry is a significant contest in the Black Sea region of Turkey. It is fueled by geographical proximity and cultural ties, with both teams representing regional pride. Although Trabzonspor has historically achieved more national success, matches against Samsunspor are marked by high stakes, passionate fan engagement, and regional identity. The rivalry showcases the Black Sea region’s deep footballing traditions and competitive spirit.

=== Rivalry with Çaykur Rizespor ===
Trabzonspor’s other principal regional rivalry is with Çaykur Rizespor, commonly referred to as the “Eastern Black Sea derby”. The rivalry is rooted in geographic proximity along the Black Sea coast, overlapping supporter bases, and frequent league and cup meetings since the 1970s. National media regularly frame it as a high-intensity local derby with strong regional identity, large away followings and heightened matchday security, reflecting the historical competition between the neighbouring provinces of Trabzon and Rize.

== Stadium ==
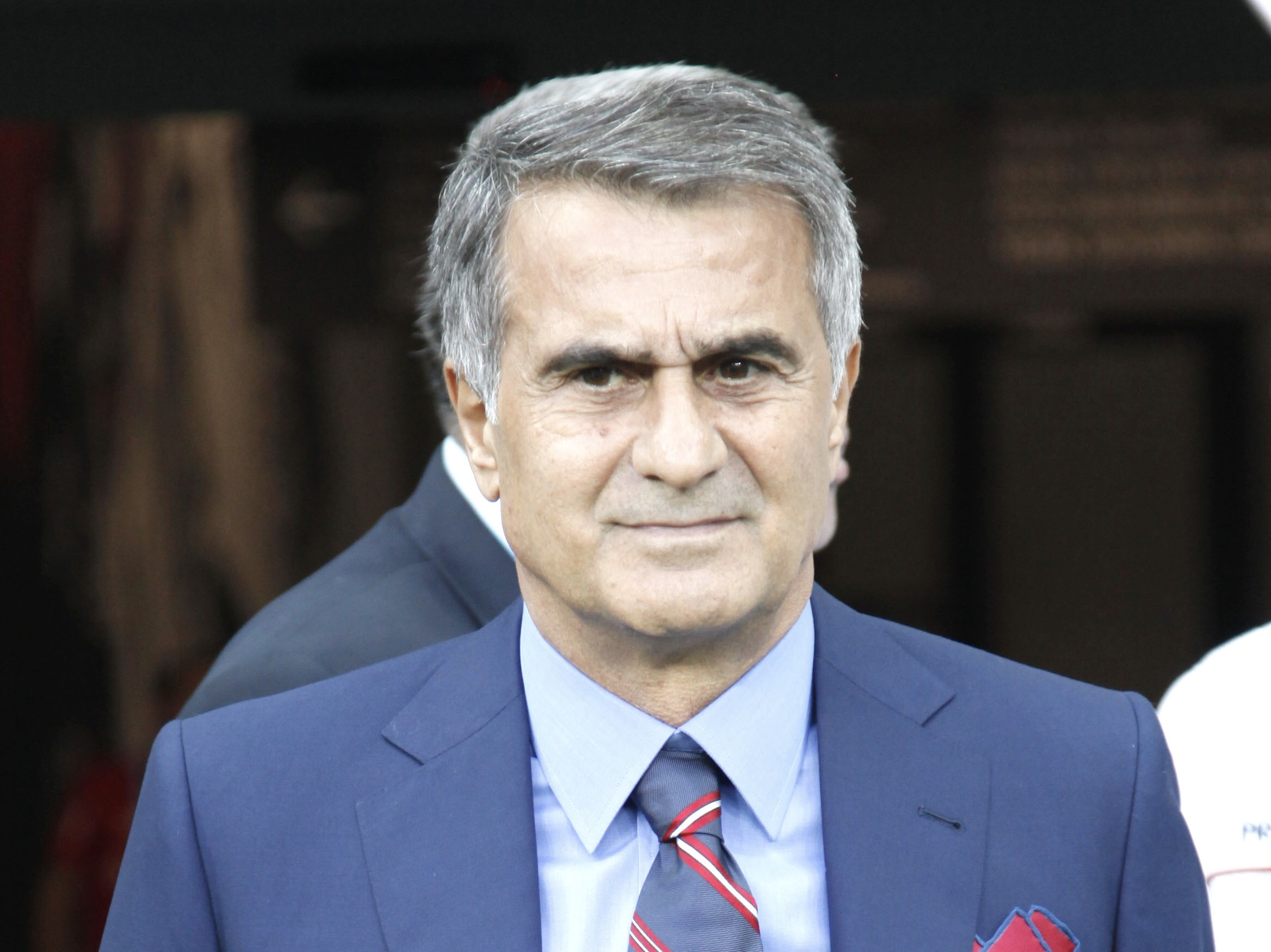
Trabzonspor's stadium is named after former goalkeeper and manager Şenol Güneş.

Since December 2016, Trabzonspor has played its home matches at the Şenol Güneş Sports Complex, a state-of-the-art stadium located in Trabzon. The stadium has a capacity of 40,980, offering modern facilities that meet international standards. Named after Şenol Güneş, a legendary figure in Trabzonspor’s history as both a goalkeeper and manager, the complex represents a new era for the club.

The stadium is equipped with advanced technology, including interactive media systems installed in the press areas, and regularly hosts important national and international football matches. It also serves as a symbol of Trabzonspor’s growth and ambition, as well as a hub for the city’s sports and cultural activities. Plans are underway to connect the stadium to Trabzon’s city center through a new tram project, improving accessibility for fans and visitors.

Prior to moving to the Şenol Güneş Sports Complex, Trabzonspor played its home matches at the Hüseyin Avni Aker Stadium, which had a capacity of 24,169. Built in 1951, the stadium served as Trabzonspor’s home ground until January 2017. Over its long history, the venue underwent several renovations to expand its capacity and modernize its facilities, particularly in the 1980s and 1990s.

Despite the stadium's closure, it remains an iconic symbol of Trabzonspor’s roots and legacy.

== Honours ==
As of 22 May 2026:

- Süper Lig
  - Champions (7): 1975–76, 1976–77, 1978–79, 1979–80, 1980–81, 1983–84, 2021–22
  - Runners-up (9): 1977–78, 1981–82, 1982–83, 1994–95, 1995–96, 2003–04, 2004–05, 2010–11, 2019–20
- 1.Lig
  - Champions (1): 1973–74
  - Runners-up (2): 1971–72, 1972–73
- Turkish Cup
  - Winners (10): 1976–77, 1977–78, 1983–84, 1991–92, 1994–95, 2002–03, 2003–04, 2009–10, 2019–20, 2025–26
  - Runners-up (8): 1974–75, 1975–76, 1984–85, 1989–90, 1996–97, 2012–13, 2023–24, 2024–25
- Turkish Super Cup
  - Winners (10): 1976, 1977, 1978, 1979, 1980, 1983, 1995, 2010, 2020, 2022
  - Runners-up: (3): 1981, 1984, 1992
- Prime Minister's Cup
  - Winners (5): 1976, 1978, 1985, 1994, 1996
  - Runners-up: (6): 1975, 1990, 1991, 1993, 1997, 1998

== Statistics ==
=== Results of League and Cup Competitions by Season ===
Season	League Table										Domestic		UEFA			Top scorer	
Season	League	Pos.	M	W	D	L	GF	GA	GD	P	ZTC	TSC	UCL	UEL	UCL (Note: Includes UEFA Cup Winners' Cup)	Player	Goals
1966–67	1. Lig	8th	30	10	10	10	30	30	0	30	R3	–	–	–	–	Selahattin Şahinkaya	6
1967–68	1. Lig	6th	38	17	11	10	45	35	+10	45	R1	–	–	–	–	Necmi Perekli	10
1968–69	1. Lig	4th	34	16	7	11	39	30	+9	39	–	–	–	–	–	Necmi Perekli	20
1969–70	1. Lig	4th	30	15	6	9	36	28	+8	36	R2	–	–	–	–	Necmi Perekli	21
1970–71	1. Lig	8th	30	11	9	10	31	29	+2	31	–	–	–	–	–	Necmi Perekli	7
1971–72	1. Lig	2nd	30	15	7	8	37	25	+12	37	–	–	–	–	–	Necmi Perekli	10
1972–73	1. Lig	2nd	30	14	11	5	39	24	+15	39	R1	–	–	–	–	Suavi Tanlak	6
1973–74	1. Lig	1st↑	30	19	9	2	47	18	+29	47	QF	–	–	–	–	İhsan Sakallıoğlu	11
1974–75	Süper Lig	9th	30	9	12	9	19	17	+2	30	RU	–	–	–	–	Hüseyin Tok	14
1975–76	Süper Lig	1st	30	17	9	4	36	14	+22	43	W	W	–	–	–	Hüseyin Tok	25
1976–77	Süper Lig	1st	30	18	7	5	41	12	+29	43	W	W	R2	–	–	Necmi Perekli	21
1977–78	Süper Lig	2nd	30	18	5	7	42	16	+26	41	W	W	R1	–	–	Cengiz Akçay	11
1978–79	Süper Lig	1st	30	13	16	1	34	7	+27	42	R6	–	R1	–	–	Orhan Akyüz	10
1979–80	Süper Lig	1st	30	12	15	3	25	11	+14	39	QF	–	R1	–	–	Serdar Bali	8
1980–81	Süper Lig	1st	30	16	7	7	41	21	+20	43	R5	–	R1	–	–	Sinan Ünal	13
1981–82	Süper Lig	2nd	32	14	15	3	26	11	+15	43	QF	–	R1	–	–	Hüsnü Özkara	7
1982–83	Süper Lig	2nd	34	17	13	4	40	19	+21	47	SF	–	R1	–	–	Levent Erköse	13
1983–84	Süper Lig	1st	34	18	14	2	43	14	+29	50	W	W	R1	–	–	Hasan Şengün	17
1984–85	Süper Lig	3rd	34	14	14	6	38	26	+12	42	RU	–	–	–	–	Tuncay Soyak	14
1985–86	Süper Lig	7th	36	12	13	11	37	27	+10	37	R6	–	–	–	–	Hasan Şengün	10
1986–87	Süper Lig	4th	36	18	13	5	49	21	+28	49	QF	–	–	–	–	Hasan Vezir	12
1987–88	Süper Lig	6th	38	16	9	13	57	51	+6	41	R4	–	–	–	–	Hami Mandıralı	20
1988–89	Süper Lig	5th	36	19	7	10	59	38	+21	45	R4	–	–	–	–	Hami Mandıralı	24
1989–90	Süper Lig	3rd	34	20	8	6	58	28	+30	48	RU	–	–	–	–	Hamdi Aslan	17
1990–91	Süper Lig	3rd	30	14	9	7	55	37	+18	51	SF	–	–	–	–	Hami Mandıralı	19
1991–92	Süper Lig	4th	30	16	7	7	56	31	+25	55	W	–	–	L32	–	Hami Mandıralı	27
1992–93	Süper Lig	3rd	30	17	9	4	57	27	+30	60	SF	–	–	–	–	Orhan Çıkırıkçı	18
1993–94	Süper Lig	3rd	30	17	8	5	67	28	+39	59	SF	–	–	–	–	Shota Arveladze	31
1994–95	Süper Lig	2nd	34	23	7	4	80	28	+52	76	W	–	–	–	R32	Orhan Kaynak	24
1995–96	Süper Lig	2nd	34	26	4	4	79	24	+55	82	QF	–	–	R2	–	Shota Arveladze	30
1996–97	Süper Lig	3rd	34	22	6	6	73	33	+40	72	RU	–	–	L32	–	Hami Mandıralı	29
1997–98	Süper Lig	3rd	34	19	9	6	68	42	+26	66	SF	–	–	R1	–	Hami Mandıralı	25
1998–99	Süper Lig	4th	34	17	7	10	48	37	+11	58	R6	–	–	–	–	Davor Vugrinec	16
1999–2000	Süper Lig	6th	34	15	8	11	47	41	+6	53	QF	–	–	–	–	Hami Mandıralı	17
2000–01	Süper Lig	5th	34	17	7	10	69	52	+17	58	QF	–	–	–	–	Hami Mandıralı	19
2001–02	Süper Lig	14th	34	11	7	16	49	60	-11	40	QF	–	–	–	–	Robson Carioca	11
2002–03	Süper Lig	7th	34	13	12	9	44	33	+11	51	W	–	–	–	–	Fatih Tekke	17
2003–04	Süper Lig	2nd	34	22	6	6	60	38	+22	72	W	–	–	R1	–	Gökdeniz Karadeniz	17
2004–05	Süper Lig	2nd	34	24	5	5	73	29	+44	77	SF	–	3QR	R2	–	Fatih Tekke	34
2005–06	Süper Lig	4th	34	15	7	12	51	42	+9	52	GS	–	2QR	–	–	Fatih Tekke	26
2006–07	Süper Lig	4th	34	15	7	12	54	55	+10	52	SF	–	–	–	–	Umut Bulut	20
2007–08	Süper Lig	6th	34	14	7	13	44	39	+5	49	GS	–	–	–	–	Umut Bulut	17
2008–09	Süper Lig	3rd	34	19	8	7	54	34	+20	65	GS	–	–	–	–	Gökhan Ünal	16
2009–10	Süper Lig	5th	34	16	9	9	53	32	+21	57	W	–	–	–	–	Umut Bulut	18
2010–11	Süper Lig	2nd	34	25	7	2	69	23	+46	82	GS	W	–	PO	–	Burak Yılmaz	20
2011–12	Süper Lig	3rd	34	15	11	8	60	39	+21	56	R4	–	GS (Note: Trabzonspor replaced Fenerbahçe in the UEFA Champions League group stage after Fenerbahçe was withdrawn by the TFF due to match-fixing allegations. Despite being eliminated in the third qualifying round, Trabzonspor was selected by UEFA as their replacement.)	L32	–	Burak Yılmaz	35
2012–13	Süper Lig	9th	34	13	7	14	39	40	-1	46	RU	–	–	PO	–	Adrian Mierzejewski	13
2013–14	Süper Lig	4th	34	14	11	9	53	41	+12	53	R4	–	–	L16	–	Paulo Henrique	21
2014–15	Süper Lig	5th	34	15	12	7	58	48	+10	57	L16	–	–	L32	–	Óscar Cardozo	20
2015–16	Süper Lig	12th	34	12	4	18	40	59	-19	40	L16	–	–	GS	–	Óscar Cardozo	8
2016–17	Süper Lig	6th	34	14	9	11	39	34	+5	51	GS	–	–	–	–	Dame N'Doye	8
2017–18	Süper Lig	5th	34	15	10	9	63	51	+12	55	L16	–	–	–	–	Burak Yılmaz	23
2018–19	Süper Lig	4th	34	18	9	7	64	46	+18	63	QF	–	–	–	–	Hugo Rodallega	16
2019–20	Süper Lig	2nd	34	18	11	5	76	42	+34	65	W	–	–	GS	–	Alexander Sørloth	33
2020–21	Süper Lig	4th	40	19	14	7	50	37	+13	71	R5	–	~~UEFA Ban (Note: On 3 June 2020, Trabzonspor was banned from UEFA competitions for one season due to FFP violations.)~~			Caleb Ekuban	11
2021–22	Süper Lig	1st	38	23	12	3	69	36	+33	81	SF	W	–	–	PO	Andreas Cornelius	17
2022–23	Süper Lig	6th	36	17	6	13	64	54	+10	57	QF	–	PO	GS	R16	Trézéguet	13
2023–24	Süper Lig	3rd	38	21	4	13	69	50	+19	67	RU	–	–	–	–	Paul Onuachu	17
2024–25	Süper Lig	7th	36	13	12	11	58	45	+13	51	RU	–	–	3QR	PO	Simon Banza	21
2025–26	Süper Lig	TBD															

=== European competitions record ===
Trabzonspor first competed in Europe in the 1976–77 season, and reached the group stages of the Champions League in the 2011–12 season.

As of 18 August 2024

Rank	Country	Team	Points
143	(Northern Ireland)	Linfield	8.500
144	(Faroe Islands)	KÍ Klaksvík	8.500
145	(Turkey)	Trabzonspor	8.500
146	(Cyprus)	Apollon	8.500
147	(Belgium)	Cercle Brugge	8.480

== Players ==
=== Current squad ===
As of 4 September 2026

Note: Flags indicate national team as defined under FIFA eligibility rules; some limited exceptions apply. Players may hold more than one non-FIFA nationality.

No.	Pos.	Nation	Player
1	GK	TUR	Ahmet Doğan Yıldırım
3	MF	FRA	Batista Mendy
4	DF	TUR	Samet Akaydin
5	MF	TUR	Okay Yokuşlu
6	MF	BRA	Fabinho
7	MF	ALB	Ernest Muçi
8	MF	MAR	Benjamin Bouchouari
9	FW	GBS	Franculino
10	FW	EGY	Mohamed Salah
11	MF	TUR	Ozan Tufan
14	FW	TUR	Umut Nayir
15	DF	MNE	Stefan Savić (captain)
17	MF	UKR	Ruslan Malinovskyi
19	MF	TUR	Mustafa Eskihellaç
20	DF	CPV	Wagner Pina

No.	Pos.	Nation	Player
24	GK	CMR	André Onana (on loan from Manchester United)
25	GK	TUR	Onuralp Çevikkan
26	MF	FRA	Tim Jabol-Folcarelli
27	DF	NGR	Chibuike Nwaiwu
30	FW	NGR	Paul Onuachu
39	DF	TUR	Cenk Özkacar
44	DF	UKR	Arseniy Batahov
55	DF	CPV	Sidny Lopes Cabral
57	MF	TUR	Melih Kabasakal
58	FW	TUR	Aral Şimşir
61	MF	TUR	Cihan Çanak
70	FW	POR	Noah Saviolo
77	MF	TUR	Metehan Mimaroğlu
96	GK	TUR	Erol Can Çolak
99	MF	TUR	Ali Habeşoğlu

=== Out on loan ===
Note: Flags indicate national team as defined under FIFA eligibility rules; some limited exceptions apply. Players may hold more than one non-FIFA nationality.

No.	Pos.	Nation	Player
—	DF	TUR	Arda Öztürk (at Iğdır until 30 June 2027)
—	DF	TUR	Oğuzhan Yılmaz (at Kahramanmaraş İstiklalspor until 30 June 2027)
—	MF	TUR	Thierry Karadeniz (at Sebatspor until 30 June 2027)
—	MF	AUT	Muhammed Cham (at Red Star Belgrade until 30 June 2027)

No.	Pos.	Nation	Player
—	FW	TUR	Poyraz Yıldırım (at Muğlaspor until 30 June 2027)
—	FW	BEL	Kazeem Olaigbe (at FC Basel until 30 June 2027)
—	MF	TUR	Göktan Gürpüz (at Çorum until 30 June 2027)
—	FW	BEL	René Mitongo (at Estrela da Amadora until 30 June 2027)

== Affiliated clubs ==
=== Youth and Academy ===
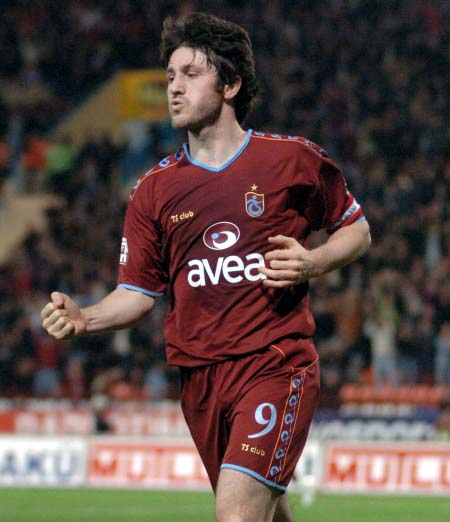
Fatih Tekke, a former youth academy star and one-time Gol Kralı (top scorer)

The U21 side functions as Trabzonspor’s principal reserve/youth development squad. The team historically competed in the national U21 Ligi (previously A2/PAF), a reserve competition organised by the Turkish Football Federation, until the league was discontinued after the 2018–19 season; club reserves have since played in the TFF’s development leagues structure. The academy/U21 pathway has produced senior internationals including forward Hami Mandıralı (club record appearance-maker), winger Gökdeniz Karadeniz (Turkey international), and striker Fatih Tekke (Süper Lig top scorer in 2004–05). In 2024–25, the U19s reached the UEFA Youth League final, becoming the first Turkish club to do so. They defeated Inter 1–0 in the quarter-finals at Papara Park before a competition-record crowd of 40,368, then beat Salzburg 2–1 in the semi-final at Nyon’s Colovray Stadium, before losing 4–1 to Barcelona in the final.

=== Trabzonspor Women ===
Trabzonspor established a women’s football department in 2007 and entered the top flight the same year. The team won the Turkish Women’s First League in 2008–09 and subsequently represented Turkey in UEFA competition the following season, becoming the first Turkish club to appear in the UEFA Women’s Champions League qualifying round. Following the TFF’s creation of the Women’s Super League in 2021, Trabzonspor re-entered the top tier under the new format.

=== 1461 Trabzon ===
1461 Trabzon functions as Trabzonspor’s affiliated “pilot” club for player development and competitive minutes, operating in the national league system. Originally known as Değirmenderespor and later Trabzon Karadenizspor, the team adopted the 1461 Trabzon name in 2010–11; a formal pilot-team cooperation protocol with Trabzonspor was most recently signed in April 2023.

== Club officials ==
=== Board members ===
Position	Name
President	(Turkey) Ertuğrul Doğan
Vice President	(Turkey) Zeyyat Kafkas
Vice President	(Turkey) Serkan Kılıç
Vice President	(Turkey) Nevzat Kaya
Vice President	(Turkey) Taner Fikret Saral
Vice President	(Turkey) Kemal Ertürk
Board Members	(Turkey) Ali Haydar Gedikli
Board Members	(Turkey) Murat İskender
Board Members	(Turkey) Birhan Emre Yazıcı
Board Members	(Turkey) İbrahim Şahinkaya
General Accountant	(Turkey) Derviş Köz
General Secretary	(Turkey) Sami Karaman
Facilities Officer	(Turkey) Coşkun Öztürk
PR Officer	(Turkey) Gözde Atasoy
Amateur Officer	(Turkey) Semih Hekimoğlu
AAdmin Officer	(Turkey) Hüseyin Ekşi
U19 Officer	(Turkey) Ali Beyazlı
TS Club Officer	(Turkey) Fatih Solak
TS Promotion Officer	(Turkey) İmdat Yılmaz
Business Development	(Turkey) Serkan Neşat Soylu
Business Development	(Turkey) Rıfat Çebi
Business Development	(Turkey) Mustafa Cem Aşık

=== Coaching staff ===
Position	Name
Head coach	(Germany) Thomas Reis
Assistant Manager	(Turkey) Ergin Keleş
Assistant Manager	(Netherlands) Ton Lokhoff
Assistant Manager	(Austria) Danijel Zenković
Assistant Manager	(Austria) Jérôme Boateng
Goalkeeper Coach	(Turkey) Candeniz Velioğlu
Goalkeeper Coach	(Germany) Marco Knoop
Performance Coach	(Turkey) Gökhan Kandemir
Analyst	(Turkey) Mesut Kabahasanoglu
Assistant Admin	(Turkey) Ercan Ildiz
Doctor	(Turkey) Ufuk Değirmenci
Doctor	(Turkey) Metin Kara
Physiotherapist	(Turkey) Mustafa Bozkurt
Physiotherapist	(Turkey) Dursun Işık
Physiotherapist	(Turkey) Oğuzhan Kolot
Physiotherapist	(Turkey) Mevlüt Arslan
Dietitian	(Turkey) Çağatay Kaşıkcı
Masseur	(Turkey) Okan Erdem
Masseur	(Turkey) Yener Usta
Masseur	(Turkey) Murat Karayavuzoğlu
Translator	(Turkey) Yunus Emre İshak
Equip Manager	(Turkey) Hayati Erol
Equip Manager	(Turkey) Cihan Birinci
Equip Manager	(Turkey) Mustafa Küçük
Equip Manager	(Turkey) Yener Sadıklar
Equip Manager	(Turkey) Muharrem Çolak

== Coaches ==
=== Notable coaches ===
Trabzonspor coaches to have won major honours. Table correct as of 29 December 2024

Name	Period	Trophies
(Turkey) Ahmet Suat Özyazıcı	1973–1978	Süper Lig (2), Turkish Cup (2), Super Cup (2)
(Turkey) Ahmet Suat Özyazıcı	1979–1980	Süper Lig (1), Super Cup (1)
(Turkey) Ahmet Suat Özyazıcı	1981–1984	Süper Lig (1), Turkish Cup (1), Super Cup (1)
(Turkey) Özkan Sümer	1978–1979	Süper Lig (1), Super Cup (1)
(Turkey) Özkan Sümer	1980–1981	Süper Lig (1)
(Belgium) Urbain Braems	1991–1992	Turkish Cup (1)
(Turkey) Şenol Güneş	1993–1997	Turkish Cup (1), Super Cup (1)
(Turkey) Şenol Güneş	2009–2013	Turkish Cup (1), Super Cup (1)
(Turkey) Samet Aybaba	2002–2003	Turkish Cup (1)
(Turkey) Ziya Doğan	2004	Turkish Cup (1)
(England) Eddie Newton	2020	Turkish Cup (1)
(Turkey) Abdullah Avcı	2020–2023	Süper Lig (1), Super Cup (2)
(Turkey) Fatih Tekke	2025-2026	Turkish Cup (1)
(Germany) Thomas Reis	2026-	-

== Presidents ==
No.	President	Trabzonspor
1	(Turkey) Ali Osman Ulusoy	1967–1968
2	(Turkey) Rıfat Dedeoğlu	1968–1969
3	(Turkey) Ali Osman Ulusoy	1969–1970
4	(Turkey) Rıfat Dedeoğlu	1970–1971
5	(Turkey) Suat Oyman	1971–1972
6	(Turkey) Salih Erdem	1972–1975
7	(Turkey) Şamil Ekinci	1975–1980
8	(Turkey) Celal Ataman	1980–1981
9	(Turkey) Mustafa Günaydın	1981–1982
10	(Turkey) Mehmet Ali Yılmaz	1982–1988
11	(Turkey) Mazhar Afacan	1988–1989
12	(Turkey) Mehmet Ali Yılmaz	1989–1992
13	(Turkey) Sadri Şener	1992–1994
14	(Turkey) Faruk Özak	1994–1997
15	(Turkey) Mehmet Ali Yılmaz	1997–2000
16	(Turkey) Özkan Sümer	2000–2003
17	(Turkey) Atay Aktuğ	2003–2006
18	(Turkey) Nuri Albayrak	2006–2008
19	(Turkey) Sadri Şener	2008–2013
20	(Turkey) İbrahim Hacıosmanoğlu	2013–2015
21	(Turkey) Muharrem Usta	2015–2018
22	(Turkey) Ahmet Ağaoğlu	2018–2023
23	(Turkey) Ertuğrul Doğan	2023–

== Other sports ==
Trabzonspor is a multisport club with departments that, at various times, have fielded teams or athletes in basketball, volleyball, handball, athletics, shooting, judo, table tennis and boxing, in addition to football.

The men’s basketball branch reached the 2015 FIBA EuroChallenge Final Four as hosts, finishing runners-up to JSF Nanterre in the final at Hayri Gür Arena (63–64). The senior team later withdrew from the Basketball Super League in October 2018 due to financial difficulties, as reported by national media and the federation’s disciplinary communications at the time.
