= Necmi Perekli =

Turkish footballer

Personal information
- Date of birth: 1 January 1948 (age 78)
- Place of birth: Gümüşhane, Turkey
- Position: Striker

Youth career
- 1963–: Trabzon Martıspor
- Trabzonspor

Senior career*
Years	Team	Apps	(Gls)
1972–1973	Giresunspor	29	(9)
1973–1974	Beşiktaş	21	(3)
1974–1975	Altay	29	(6)
1975–1977	Trabzonspor	43	(25)

International career
1976–1977	Turkey	3	(0)
- * Club domestic league appearances and goals

Necmi Perekli (born 1948) is a Turkish former footballer.

Necmi played for Trabzonspor in the late 1970s, becoming the first player of Trabzonspor to become the top scorer in Turkish 1st league (became Turkish Super League since 2002–03 season). He scored 18 goals in 22 appearances in the 1976–77 season, helping them to retain the title they had won for the first time the previous season. He was also played in Giresunspor (1972–1973), Beşiktaş (1973–1974) and Altay (1974–1975).

He works as a sports writer in Fotomaç, a sport newspaper in Turkey.
