= Sadi Tekelioğlu =

Turkish footballer

Personal information
- Full name: Sadettin Tekelioğlu
- Date of birth: 15 January 1955 (age 71)
- Place of birth: Trabzon, Turkey

Team information
- Current team: Isparta 32 (manager)

Managerial career
- Years: Team
- 1990–1992: Bafraspor
- 1992–1993: Gençlerbirliği (assistant)
- 1993–1994: Erzurumspor
- 1995–1996: Kastamonuspor
- 1996: Gençlerbirliği (assistant)
- 1996–1997: Gençlerbirliği
- 1998: Konyaspor
- 1999: Erzurumspor
- 2001: Trabzonspor
- 2002–2003: Akçaabat Sebatspor
- 2003: Sakaryaspor
- 2004–2004: Akçaabat Sebatspor
- 2005: Kocaelispor
- 2007: Türk Telekom
- 2008: Adana Demirspor
- 2009–2011: Trabzonspor (academy)
- 2011–2012: Sarıyer
- 2013–2015: Trabzonspor (academy)
- 2015–2016: Trabzonspor (caretaker)
- 2016: Trabzonspor (academy)
- 2018: Hekimoğlu Trabzon
- 2019–2020: Gölcükspor
- 2020: Artvin Hopaspor
- 2020–: Isparta 32

Sadi Tekelioğlu (born 15 January 1955) is a Turkish football manager.
