= Özkan Sümer =

Turkish footballer (1940–2020)

Personal information
- Date of birth: 20 November 1940
- Place of birth: Maçka, Trabzon Province, Turkey
- Date of death: 22 December 2020 (aged 80)
- Place of death: Ortahisar, Trabzon, Turkey
- Position: Defender

Senior career*
Years	Team	Apps	(Gls)
- Trabzonspor
- Kardemir Karabükspor
- Akçaabat Sebatspor
1967–1970	Trabzonspor		

Managerial career
- 1978–1981: Trabzonspor
- 1981: Turkey
- 1982–1983: Galatasaray
- 1984–1985: Trabzonspor
- 1990–1991: Trabzonspor
- 1998: Trabzonspor
- 2000–2001: Mobellaspor
- * Club domestic league appearances and goals

Özkan Sümer (20 November 1940 – 22 December 2020) was a Turkish footballer, manager, and president of Trabzonspor (2001–2003). He played as a defender for Trabzonspor (and later coached the same club), Galatasaray, and the Turkey national team.

== Playing career ==
Sümer was born in Maçka and started to play football in his home town's club of Trabzonspor. After some time at Kardemir Karabükspor and Akçaabat Sebatspor, Sümer rejoined Trabzonspor. He was a successful defender of his team. During this time, he earned the nickname Deve Özkan due to his tallness and stubborn rough playing temperament.

== Managerial career ==
After having ended his playing career, Sümer served as an instructor for a while at the TFF. He coached later the youth and amateur squads of Trabzonspor before he was appointed manager of the main team in 1978.

Trabzonspor became 1.Lig champion with Sümer as manager in the seasons 1978–79 and 1980–81. In 1981, he was appointed manager of the Turkey national team. The national team played two matches under his managership losing both. He then transferred to coach Galatasaray in the 1982–83 season. Sümer was manager again at Trabzonspor in the seasons 1984–85, 1990–91 and 1998. In the season 2000–01, he coached Mobellaspor, a TFF Second League club in Konya.

== Club president ==
In 2001, Sümer was elected president of Trabzonspor succeeding Mehmet Ali Yılmaz. He resigned from this post on 5 September 2003 in protest against a resolution made by the Ombudsman Board of the TFF that lifted a ban against Fenerbahçe concluded before the he after of Trabzonspor SK president in Atay Aktuğ.

== Coordinator ==
From 22 July 2006 Sümer served as the regional coordinator for education at Trabzonspor.

In 2007, he co-founded the women's football branch of Trabzonspor along with Zeliha Şimşek, a former KTÜ women's club footballer only six weeks before the beginning of the football season. The team was invited to join the Turkish Women's Football Premier League in its first season of 2007–08. Trabzonspor women became league champion already the next season.

== Death ==
Sümer died 22 December 2020, at the age of 80, at KTÜ Farabi Hospital, where he had been receiving cancer treatment. He was funeral prayer of İskenderpaşa Mosque and buried in the family cemetery in Maçka.

== Honors ==
=== As manager ===
Trabzonspor

- 1.Lig: 1978–79, 1980–81
- President's Cup: 1978–79
- Prime Minister's Cup: 1984–85 with İlyas Akçay

Galatasaray

- Turkish Cup: 1981–82

=== As club president ===
Trabzonspor

- Turkish Cup: 2002–03
