= 1975–76 1.Lig =

18th season of top-tier Turkish football

1.Lig
- Season: 1975–76
- Champions: Trabzonspor; 1st title
- Relegated: Ankaragücü; Balıkesirspor
- European Cup: Trabzonspor
- Cup Winners' Cup: Galatasaray
- UEFA Cup: Fenerbahçe; Adanaspor
- Matches: 240
- Goals: 479 (2 per match)
- Top goalscorer: Ali Osman Renklibay (18 goals)

Statistics of the Turkish First Football League for the 1975–76 season.

== Overview ==
Sixteen teams participated, and Trabzonspor won the championship, becoming the first team outside of Istanbul to win the league title.

== League table ==
Pos	Team	Pld	W	D	L	GF	GA	GD	Pts	Qualification or relegation
1	Trabzonspor (C)	30	17	9	4	36	14	+22	43	Qualification to European Cup first round
2	Fenerbahçe	30	14	12	4	40	18	+22	40	Qualification to UEFA Cup first round
3	Galatasaray	30	12	13	5	36	23	+13	37	Qualification to Cup Winners' Cup first round
4	Adanaspor	30	13	10	7	36	27	+9	36	Qualification to UEFA Cup first round
5	Altay	30	9	12	9	31	32	−1	30	Invitation to Balkans Cup
6	Giresunspor	30	8	12	10	27	27	0	28	
7	Boluspor	30	9	10	11	34	38	−4	28	
8	Adana Demirspor	30	10	8	12	28	35	−7	28	
9	Eskişehirspor	30	8	11	11	29	29	0	27	
10	Bursaspor	30	9	9	12	30	33	−3	27	
11	Beşiktaş	30	5	17	8	25	32	−7	27	
12	Orduspor	30	7	13	10	20	27	−7	27	
13	Zonguldakspor	30	7	12	11	25	25	0	26	
14	Göztepe A.Ş.	30	7	12	11	31	32	−1	26	
15	MKE Ankaragücü (R)	30	8	9	13	33	48	−15	25	Relegation to Turkish Second Football League
16	Balıkesirspor (R)	30	9	7	14	18	39	−21	25	Relegation to Turkish Second Football League

Rules for classification: 1) points; 2) goal difference; 3) number of goals scored.
(C) Champions; (R) Relegated

== Results ==
Home \ Away	ADS	ADA	ALT	BAL	BJK	BOL	BUR	ESK	FNB	GAL	GRS	GÖZ	AGÜ	ORD	TRA	ZON
Adana Demirspor		0–2	2–1	2–0	2–0	2–1	2–1	2–0	3–2	0–0	1–0	2–0	0–0	3–1	1–2	0–0
Adanaspor	0–0		2–1	6–1	4–2	1–1	2–0	1–0	1–1	0–0	1–0	1–0	0–0	1–0	2–1	1–0
Altay	1–0	3–2		1–0	0–0	1–1	3–0	1–0	1–1	1–3	2–0	1–1	2–1	1–0	0–2	1–1
Balıkesirspor	1–0	0–3	4–2		1–1	2–1	1–0	1–0	0–0	1–0	1–0	1–0	1–1	1–0	0–0	1–1
Beşiktaş	1–1	0–0	1–0	1–0		3–3	1–1	2–3	1–1	1–1	2–1	1–1	2–0	1–0	0–1	1–1
Boluspor	1–1	5–1	3–2	1–0	0–0		1–0	0–0	0–1	0–1	2–1	2–1	4–0	2–1	0–0	1–3
Bursaspor	0–0	0–1	2–0	1–0	2–0	2–0		3–1	0–0	1–1	1–2	2–1	2–0	1–1	0–1	2–1
Eskişehirspor	1–1	1–1	0–0	0–0	0–0	1–1	2–1		0–1	1–1	1–1	3–0	5–1	3–0	1–0	1–0
Fenerbahçe	4–0	2–0	1–0	3–0	3–0	2–0	3–1	2–1		1–3	1–1	0–0	1–1	3–0	0–0	2–2
Galatasaray	3–0	2–1	1–1	2–0	1–0	0–0	1–1	1–1	1–0		1–3	1–0	3–1	0–0	1–2	2–0
Giresunspor	1–0	0–0	1–1	2–0	1–1	0–1	3–1	1–0	0–1	1–1		2–0	0–0	0–0	0–0	1–1
Göztepe	2–0	1–1	0–0	1–1	0–0	5–1	2–2	3–0	0–2	2–0	0–0		1–0	0–0	0–0	2–1
MKE Ankaragücü	4–2	2–0	2–2	2–0	1–1	3–2	1–0	1–0	1–1	2–4	3–4	1–5		3–1	0–1	2–1
Orduspor	1–0	1–0	0–0	3–0	2–1	0–0	0–0	1–1	0–0	1–1	2–1	1–1	2–0		1–1	0–0
Trabzonspor	1–0	2–0	1–2	3–0	1–1	3–0	1–1	2–1	1–0	1–0	2–0	4–2	0–0	2–0		1–0
Zonguldakspor	4–1	1–1	0–0	2–0	0–0	1–0	1–2	0–1	0–1	0–0	0–0	2–0	1–0	0–1	1–0	

Source: TFF, Mackolik
Legend: Blue = home team win; Yellow = draw; Red = away team win.
