= 1981–82 1.Lig =

24th season of top-tier Turkish football

1.Lig
- Season: 1981–82
- Champions: Beşiktaş; 6th title
- Relegated: Eskişehirspor; Göztepe; Diyarbakırspor
- European Cup: Beşiktaş
- Cup Winners' Cup: Galatasaray
- UEFA Cup: Trabzonspor
- Matches: 292
- Goals: 490 (1.68 per match)
- Top goalscorer: Selçuk Yula (16 goals)

The 1981-82 Turkish First Football League season saw 17 teams in competition. Beşiktaş J.K. won the championship.

== League table ==
| Pos | Team | Pld | W | D | L | GF | GA | GD | Pts | Qualification or relegation |
|---|---|---|---|---|---|---|---|---|---|---|
| 1 | Beşiktaş (C) | 32 | 14 | 16 | 2 | 38 | 17 | +21 | 44 | Qualification to European Cup first round |
| 2 | Trabzonspor | 32 | 14 | 15 | 3 | 26 | 11 | +15 | 43 | Qualification to UEFA Cup first round |
| 3 | Fenerbahçe | 32 | 15 | 11 | 6 | 48 | 26 | +22 | 41 | |
| 4 | Zonguldakspor | 32 | 12 | 13 | 7 | 30 | 26 | +4 | 37 | |
| 5 | Sakaryaspor | 32 | 14 | 8 | 10 | 36 | 28 | +8 | 36 | |
| 6 | Adana Demirspor | 32 | 10 | 13 | 9 | 30 | 23 | +7 | 33 | |
| 7 | MKE Ankaragücü | 32 | 14 | 5 | 13 | 31 | 28 | +3 | 33 | |
| 8 | Adanaspor | 32 | 11 | 11 | 10 | 24 | 27 | −3 | 33 | |
| 9 | Altay | 32 | 8 | 16 | 8 | 37 | 27 | +10 | 32 | |
| 10 | Kocaelispor | 32 | 10 | 12 | 10 | 36 | 31 | +5 | 32 | |
| 11 | Galatasaray | 32 | 10 | 12 | 10 | 26 | 26 | 0 | 32 | Qualification to Cup Winners' Cup first round |
| 12 | Boluspor | 32 | 7 | 17 | 8 | 24 | 24 | 0 | 31 | |
| 13 | Bursaspor | 32 | 11 | 9 | 12 | 25 | 26 | −1 | 31 | |
| 14 | Gaziantepspor | 32 | 9 | 12 | 11 | 30 | 35 | −5 | 30 | |
| 15 | Eskişehirspor (R) | 32 | 10 | 9 | 13 | 16 | 27 | −11 | 29 | Relegation to Turkish Second Football League |
| 16 | Göztepe A.Ş. (R) | 32 | 4 | 8 | 20 | 17 | 53 | −36 | 16 | Relegation to Turkish Second Football League |
| 17 | Diyarbakırspor (R) | 32 | 2 | 7 | 23 | 16 | 55 | −39 | 11 | Relegation to Turkish Second Football League |

Rules for classification: 1) points; 2) goal difference; 3) number of goals scored.
(C) Champions; (R) Relegated

== Results ==
| Home \ Away | ADS | ADA | ALT | BJK | BOL | BUR | DYB | ESK | FNB | GAL | GAZ | GÖZ | KOC | AGÜ | SAK | TRA | ZON |
|---|---|---|---|---|---|---|---|---|---|---|---|---|---|---|---|---|---|
| Adana Demirspor | | 0–0 | 0–1 | 1–0 | 1–0 | 2–0 | 6–0 | 0–0 | 1–1 | 1–3 | 2–1 | 3–0 | 1–1 | 1–0 | 2–1 | 0–1 | 1–1 |
| Adanaspor | 0–0 | | 0–0 | 0–1 | 1–0 | 0–0 | 1–0 | 2–0 | 0–0 | 2–1 | 2–0 | 0–0 | 1–0 | 1–0 | 4–2 | 0–1 | 1–0 |
| Altay | 1–1 | 4–1 | | 0–0 | 2–1 | 3–1 | 8–1 | 0–0 | 3–3 | 0–0 | 1–1 | 2–0 | 1–1 | 0–0 | 0–2 | 0–0 | 4–0 |
| Beşiktaş | 1–0 | 1–1 | 0–0 | | 1–2 | 1–0 | 1–1 | 2–0 | 0–0 | 2–0 | 4–1 | 2–2 | 0–0 | 2–1 | 2–0 | 0–0 | 1–1 |
| Boluspor | 0–0 | 3–0 | 0–0 | 1–1 | | 1–2 | 1–0 | 0–0 | 1–0 | 1–1 | 0–0 | 1–1 | 1–0 | 2–1 | 0–0 | 1–1 | 2–2 |
| Bursaspor | 1–0 | 0–1 | 1–0 | 1–2 | 0–0 | | 1–0 | 0–0 | 2–2 | 0–0 | 2–1 | 3–0 | 2–0 | 0–0 | 0–1 | 1–1 | 1–1 |
| Diyarbakırspor | 1–0 | 0–1 | 3–1 | 1–1 | 0–2 | 0–2 | | 0–1 | 0–1 | 1–2 | 0–0 | 0–1 | 1–1 | 1–1 | 1–1 | 0–0 | 0–1 |
| Eskişehirspor | 0–3 | 1–0 | 0–2 | 0–3 | 2–0 | 2–1 | 1–0 | | 1–1 | 0–1 | 2–0 | 2–1 | 0–0 | 0–2 | 1–0 | 0–0 | 0–0 |
| Fenerbahçe | 0–0 | 2–1 | 3–0 | 0–1 | 1–1 | 1–0 | 2–1 | 1–0 | | 1–0 | 5–1 | 2–0 | 5–1 | 3–0 | 0–1 | 1–1 | 3–0 |
| Galatasaray | 0–0 | 0–0 | 0–0 | 1–1 | 2–1 | 0–1 | 2–1 | 0–2 | 0–0 | | 1–0 | 1–0 | 0–1 | 0–0 | 2–2 | 0–0 | 2–2 |
| Gaziantepspor | 3–1 | 2–2 | 0–0 | 0–2 | 1–1 | 3–0 | 2–0 | 2–0 | 2–0 | 0–1 | | 1–0 | 1–1 | 1–0 | 3–1 | 0–0 | 0–0 |
| Göztepe | 0–0 | 1–1 | 1–1 | 0–2 | 1–1 | 0–1 | 3–1 | 0–1 | 2–1 | 0–4 | 0–3 | | 0–2 | 1–2 | 2–1 | 1–1 | 0–1 |
| Kocaelispor | 0–1 | 0–0 | 1–1 | 1–1 | 2–0 | 0–1 | 4–1 | 2–0 | 3–4 | 0–1 | 1–1 | 4–0 | | 3–0 | 0–0 | 1–3 | 1–1 |
| MKE Ankaragücü | 3–1 | 2–0 | 1–0 | 1–2 | 1–0 | 1–0 | 2–0 | 2–0 | 1–3 | 2–0 | 0–0 | 1–0 | 1–2 | | 2–0 | 2–0 | 1–0 |
| Sakaryaspor | 2–0 | 4–1 | 2–1 | 0–0 | 0–0 | 1–1 | 3–1 | 1–0 | 1–2 | 1–0 | 1–0 | 4–0 | 2–1 | 1–0 | | 0–0 | 1–0 |
| Trabzonspor | 0–0 | 1–0 | 1–0 | 0–0 | 0–0 | 1–0 | 1–0 | 0–0 | 1–0 | 1–0 | 5–0 | 2–0 | 0–1 | 1–0 | 1–0 | | 1–3 |
| Zonguldakspor | 1–1 | 1–0 | 2–1 | 1–1 | 0–0 | 1–0 | 1–0 | 1–0 | 0–0 | 3–1 | 0–0 | 2–0 | 0–1 | 3–1 | 1–0 | 0–1 | |

Source: TFF, Mackolik
Legend: Blue = home team win; Yellow = draw; Red = away team win.
