= Trabzon İdmangücü =

İdmangücü was established in 1924 in Trabzon, Turkey. It is a sports club, with a green and white colour scheme.

Nowadays, İdmangücü is active on football, basketball, handball, and swimming branches. Football is the most successful branch of the club and they won many championships in Trabzon before national tournament started. Today, the soccer team plays at a local amateur league. The head of the club is Tayfun Bircan and their soccer coach is Şükrü Buyukluoğlu.
