= 1977–78 in Turkish football =

The 1977–78 season was the 74th season of competitive football in Turkey.

== Overview ==
Fenerbahçe won their ninth 1.Lig title in 1977–78. Cemil Turan, forward for Fenerbahçe, finished as top scorer with 17 goals. Trabzonspor finished runners-up, and Adanaspor finished third, their highest finish. Ankaragücü and Mersin İdmanyurdu were relegated to the 2.Lig, while Göztepe and MKE Kırıkkalespor were promoted to the 1.Lig. Trabzonspor won the Turkish Cup, Cumhurbaşkanlığı Kupası (Super Cup), and Başbakanlık Kupası (Chancellor Cup).

All clubs qualified for European competition (Trabzonspor, Fenerbahçe, Altay, and Beşiktaş) were knocked out in the first round of their respective competitions.

== Awards ==
- Gol Kralı (Goal King)
  - Cemil Turan (Fenerbahçe) – 17 goals

== Honours ==
Competition	Winner	Runners-up
1.Lig	Fenerbahçe (9)	Trabzonspor (1)
2.Lig	Göztepe (1)	MKE Kırıkkalespor (1)
Turkish Cup	Trabzonspor (2)	Adana Demirspor (1)
Cumhurbaşkanlığı Kupası	Trabzonspor (3)	Fenerbahçe (3)
Başbakanlık Kupası	Trabzonspor (2)	Adana Demirspor (1)

== European qualification ==
Competition	Qualifiers	Reason for qualification
European Cup	Fenerbahçe	1st in 1.Lig
UEFA Cup	Galatasaray	3rd in 1.Lig
UEFA Cup	Adanaspor	4th in 1.Lig
European Cup Winners' Cup	Trabzonspor	Turkish Cup winners

== Final league table ==
Pos	Team	Pld	W	D	L	GF	GA	±	Pts	Notes
1	Fenerbahçe	30	17	8	5	48	24	+24	42	European Cup
2	Trabzonspor	30	18	5	7	42	16	+12	41	European Cup Winners' Cup
3	Galatasaray	30	13	12	5	38	26	+12	38	UEFA Cup
4	Adanaspor	30	12	11	7	28	31	-3	35	UEFA Cup
5	Beşiktaş	30	12	8	10	33	29	+4	32	
6	Altay	30	9	12	9	29	28	+1	30	
7	Boluspor	30	11	8	11	25	26	-1	30	
8	Zonguldakspor	30	11	8	11	33	35	-2	30	
9	Diyarbakırspor	30	10	10	10	29	31	-2	30	
10	Bursaspor	30	9	10	11	26	24	+2	28	
11	Orduspor	30	10	7	13	30	29	+1	27	
12	Eskişehirspor	30	6	13	11	24	28	-4	25	
13	Adana Demirspor	30	7	11	12	24	36	-12	25	
14	Samsunspor	30	8	8	14	25	36	-11	24	
15	Ankaragücü	30	8	6	16	21	31	-10	22	Relegated to the 2.Lig
16	Mersin İdmanyurdu	30	3	15	12	19	34	-15	21	Relegated to the 2.Lig

Notes

- Tiebreakers are the average of goals scored to goals allowed.

== Türkiye Kupası final ==
First leg

1978-05-10

Trabzonspor	3 – 0	Adana Demirspor
Ali Kemal 1'; Mehmet 13'; Cemil 90' (pen.)	(Report)

Şehir Stadyumu, Trabzon
Referee: Ziya Türkdoğan (Turkey

Second leg

1978-05-24

Adana Demirspor	0 – 0	Trabzonspor
	(Report)

Şehir Stadyumu, Adana
Referee: İhsan Türe (Turkey

1978 Türkiye Kupası winners
Trabzonspor
Second title

== National team ==
The Turkey national football team competed in seven matches during the 1977–78 season. The team finished with a record of one win, one draw, and five losses.

7 September 1977

Czechoslovakia	1 – 0	Turkey

21 September 1977

Bulgaria	3 – 1	Turkey

30 October 1977

Turkey	0 – 1	Austria

16 November 1977

Turkey	1 – 2	East Germany

27 November 1977

Malta	0 – 3	Turkey

22 March 1978

Turkey	1 – 1	Romania

5 April 1978

Republic of Ireland	4 – 2	Turkey
