= Adana football derby =

Football rivalry in Turkey

Adana Derby
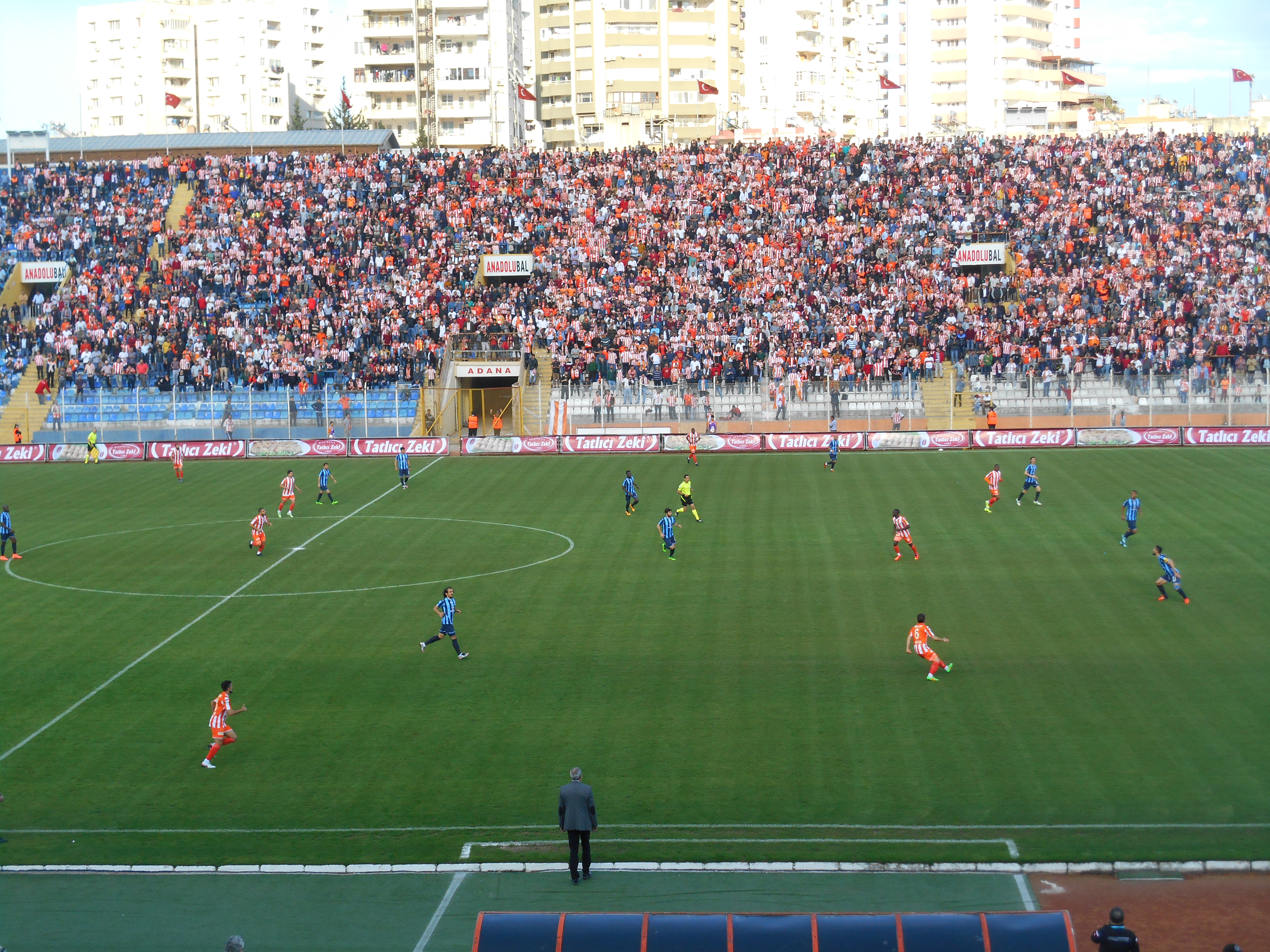
- Adanaspor hosting the 2016 derby
- Other names: El kebabiko Cotton vs Iron; Orange vs Blue
- Location: Adana
- Teams: Adanaspor (Taurus Tigers); Adana Demirspor (Blue Lightnings)
- First meeting: Adana Demirspor 7-0 Adanaspor; Adana League (18 November 1956)
- Latest meeting: Adanaspor 2-2 Adana Demirspor; TFF First League (14 February 2021)
- Next meeting: TBD
- Broadcasters: beIN Sports
- Stadiums: New Adana Stadium (shared ground)

Statistics
- Total meetings: 63
- Most wins: Adanaspor (22)
- All-time series (Turkish Leagues only): Adanaspor: 22; Draw: 25; Adana Demirspor: 16

The Adana derby (Turkish: Adana derbisi) is a local derby that takes place between Adanaspor and Adana Demirspor, the two professional football league teams based in Adana. The derby is the semi-annual attestation of the rivalry for citywide support and domination which dates back to 1956. It is a rivalry that is rooted in socio-economic divisions, in which Adana Demirspor are originally the club of workers and landowners, Adanaspor are the club of merchants and artisans. Adana derby is considered to be one of the biggest derby matches outside Istanbul.

Adanaspor and Adana Demirspor have met competitively a total of 63 times, with Adanaspor leading the meetings by 22 wins to Adana Demir's 16 wins. Archrivals have played 26 games at the Turkish first tier, 28 games at the Second Tier and 6 games at the Third Tier. At the 2005–06 season, Adanaspor withdrew from the competition due to financial reasons, thus 4 derby wins of Adana Demirspor at the Third Tier are 3-0 by de jure. On 14 February 2021, the derby took place for the last time at the 5 Ocak Stadium, where all the derby games took place. Next derby will be played at the newly constructed New Adana Stadium.

== History ==
=== Roots of rivalry ===
Adana Demirspor was founded in 1940 by the employees of TCDD. Club's thriving success at the Adana League, built a huge worker fan base in the city and attracted landowners to finance the club. Feeling alienated with the worker supported, landowner financed, TCDD governed club, middle-class merchants and artisans founded Adanaspor in 1954. Thus, Turkey's first and only city rivalry that is rooted in socio-economic divisions, was born. Adana Demirspor evolved to be a club of worker class and rich landowners, whereas Adanaspor became the club of the middle class. The first match between Adana Demir and Adanaspor was played on 18 November 1956 at the 5 Ocak Stadium. At this historical derby, the strong Adana Demirspor destroyed the recently founded Adanaspor with 7–0 score. One of the few major football derbies of Turkey began with this match and continues to this day.

=== Golden years ===
Adana Demirspor continued their success after Adanaspor's foundation and their popularity grew further. This was unusual in Turkey for an institution-based club, where all the other popular club's were born from community groups. At the General Assembly in 1969, Mahmut Karabucak became the first President outside of TCDD. As the club became prone to be governed by politicians, landowners and business people who vest interest, the club management started degenerating by 1970. At the mean time, Adanaspor merged with the local clubs, Torosspor and Akınspor in 1966, to be more competitive. Managed by modest middle class, with the soul of a college team, Adanaspor promoted to the Turkish top flight in early 1970s, and throughout 1970s and early 1980s became one of the top five clubs of Turkish Football. Participation in European competitions, in addition to the national success, attracted many locals to the club from all strata of the city, mostly middle class. Adana Demirspor kept their fan base during this period, by also competing in the Turkish top division and playing against Adanaspor 22 times at the Süper Lig from 1973 to 1984. They had 4 more derbies from 1988 to 1990 at the top division. Thus, from mid 1970s to 1990, Adanaspor and Adana Demir rivalry was at the top. During this period, they almost had equal number of support, and during derby games, the stadium was always divided equally for both clubs fans.

=== Derby at the lower divisions ===
Adana Demirspor had relegated Turkish Second Tier in 1995 and could not return to top division since then. From 1995 to 1998, Adana derby took place at the Second Tier. At the General Assembly in 1996, Adanaspor were converted into a commercial company by the members, due to financial problems. Adanaspor could not resolve the financial issues, and in early 2000s, Uzan Group took over the club. After three successful years, Adanaspor had relegated all the way to amateur league with the bankruptcy of Uzan Group. There were no derbies during these years as they were in different divisions. After 9 years, Adana derby took place at the Turkish Third Tier at the 2007–08 season. Next Adana derby took place in 2012–13 season, after Adana Demir's promotion to Second Tier. Except the 2016–17 season in which Adanaspor were at the Süper Lig, Adana derby took place 15 times since 2012 all at the Second Tier.

== Fan traditions and the derby day ==
The logo and jersey colors of Adanaspor, orange-white, symbolizes orange and cotton, and since it is founded by the local merchants and artisans, and had always been governed by locals, Adanaspor fans believe their club are the true representation of the city. Adanaspor fans tease Adana Demirspor for being an Ankara-based institution club with 38 carbon copies. Adana Demir fans feel proud for being founded by railway workers and keeping that spirit to this day. Although club can be governed at times by the businessmen, true owners of the club are always them. Adana Demir fans teases Adanaspor for selling the, once community club Adanaspor to a corporate and converting it into one of the few commercial clubs of Turkey. Adanaspor boasts with their successful history, Adana Demir boasts with their large fan base. Adanaspor claims Adana is orange (tr:Adana Turuncudur), in spite, Adana Demir claims Adana is blue (tr:Adana mavidir). Orange color is so accustomed with Adanaspor that, Adana Demirspor fans did not join the Orange Blossom Carnival parade for the first couple of years. With the worker spirit, Adana Demir fans join the Labour Day march and the related events every year, whereas Adanaspor fans usually do not attend these. The only event both fans get together was the Gezi Park protests. On the day of the big protest march where an estimated 50 thousand people had participated, Adana Demir and Adanaspor fans cheered together at the Atatürk Park in Seyhan to protest the Ankara government and the Prime Minister Erdoğan.

=== Derby day ===
On the week of the derby, teasing started among both clubs' official social media accounts and fan accounts. Both fan associations prepared for the derby by designing and building their stadium banners and rehearsing their cheers. Coaches of both clubs attended the press conference at the TSYD Adana branch (Turkish: Türk Spor Yazarları Derneği) and called for friendship. Due to the limited capacity of the 5 Ocak stadium, derby tickets get sold out within minutes once they are on sale. On the derby day, action starts early in the morning. Both teams fans have their traditional Adana breakfasts at their hangout liver restaurants in the Kazancılar area of the old town. After a prolong derby discussion, both teams fans slowly walk to their gathering area. Adana Demirspor fans gather at the north of the 5 Ocak Stadium, at a place they call Amsterdam Çıkmazı (en: Amsterdam blind). Adanaspor fans gather south of the stadium, to enter their stand.

Adana Demirspor's fan association Şimşekler Grubu settle at the North Stand of the stadium at their traditional place. Adanaspor's fan association Turbeyler settle at the South Stand at their every match location where they call Arjantin Köşe (en: Argentine corner). Before 2000s, the West and the large East stand were shared equally by Adana Demir and Adanaspor fans, Adana Demir fans settle at the north seats of these Stands and Adanaspor fans settle at the south section. Since 2000s, though the stadium is shared, the entire West and East Stands were open only to the fans of the official host of the derby match. When Adana Demirspor is hosting, Adanaspor fans are only allowed to the 1600-seat South Stand and when Adanaspor is hosting, Adana Demirspor fans are only allowed to the 1600-seat North Stand.

== Statistics ==
Adana Demir and Adanaspor have played 63 matches at the Turkish football league system.

Team	Turkish Leagues				Turkish Cups		Grand Total
Team	Süper Lig	TFF First League	TFF Second League	Total	Turkish Cup	Total	Grand Total
Adanaspor	10	9	1	20	2	2	22
Adana Demir	3	7	5	15	1	1	16
Draw	13	12	0	25	0	0	25
TOTAL	26	28	6	60	3	3	63

=== TSYD Adana Cup ===
Adanaspor and Adana Demirspor had joined the 4-team pre-season tournament, TSYD Adana Cup, every year from 1977 to 2002. Adana Demir have won the title 9 times and Adanaspor won 8 times. 3 other clubs have won the cup total of 8 times.

Club	Titles	Years won
Adana Demirspor	9	1977, 1980, 1981, 1985, 1986, 1993, 1994, 1997, 2002
Adanaspor	8	1978, 1982, 1987, 1988, 1989, 1992, 1995, 2001

=== Adanaspor biggest wins ===
- Adanaspor 3-0 Adana Demir in 1988–89 season

=== Adana Demirspor biggest wins ===
- Adana Demir 7–0 Adanaspor on 18 November 1956
- Adana Demir 5–1 Adanaspor in 1995–96 season
- Adana Demir 4–1 Adanaspor on 8 February 2020

== Matches played ==
=== Turkish Leagues ===
Adanaspor vs. Adana Demirspor
Season	Date	Competition	Home team	Score	Away team
1973–74	04.11.1973	Süper Lig	Adanaspor	1–0	Adana Demir
1973-74	31.03.1974	Süper Lig	Adana Demir	0–0	Adanaspor
1974-75	27.10.1974	Süper Lig	Adanaspor	0–1	Adana Demir
1974-75	23.03.1975	Süper Lig	Adana Demir	1–0	Adanaspor
1975–76	14.09.1975	Süper Lig	Adanaspor	0–0	Adana Demir
1975–76	22.02.1976	Süper Lig	Adana Demir	0–2	Adanaspor
1976–77	05.09.1976	Süper Lig	Adana Demir	1–2	Adanaspor
1976–77	13.02.1977	Süper Lig	Adanaspor	1–1	Adana Demir
1977–78	04.09.1977	Süper Lig	Adanaspor	1–1	Adana Demir
1977–78	26.02.1978	Süper Lig	Adana Demir	0–1	Adanaspor
1978–79	27.08.1978	Süper Lig	Adanaspor	0–0	Adana Demir
1978–79		Süper Lig	Adana Demir	0–1	Adanaspor
1979–80	11.02.1979	Süper Lig	Adanaspor	1–1	Adana Demir
1979–80	09.09.1979	Süper Lig	Adana Demir	0–1	Adanaspor
1980–81		Süper Lig	Adanaspor	1–0	Adana Demir
1980–81		Süper Lig	Adana Demir	0–1	Adanaspor
1981–82		Süper Lig	Adanaspor	0–0	Adana Demir
1981–82		Süper Lig	Adana Demir	0–0	Adanaspor
1982–83		Süper Lig	Adanaspor	0–1	Adana Demir
1982–83		Süper Lig	Adana Demir	1–1	Adanaspor
1983–84		Süper Lig	Adanaspor	0–0	Adana Demir
1983–84		Süper Lig	Adana Demir	0–0	Adanaspor
1988–89		Süper Lig	Adanaspor	2–2	Adana Demir
1988–89		Süper Lig	Adana Demir	0–3	Adanaspor
1989–90		Süper Lig	Adanaspor	3–3	Adana Demir
1989–90		Süper Lig	Adana Demir	2–3	Adanaspor
1992–93		TFF First League	Adanaspor	3–3	Adana Demir
1992–93		TFF First League	Adana Demir	2–2	Adanaspor
1992–93		TFF First League	Adanaspor	3–1	Adana Demir
1992–93		TFF First League	Adana Demir	1–1	Adanaspor
1993–94		TFF First League	Adanaspor	1–1	Adana Demir
1993–94		TFF First League	Adana Demir	0–1	Adanaspor
1995–96		TFF First League	Adanaspor	2–0	Adana Demir
1995–96		TFF First League	Adana Demir	5–1	Adanaspor
1995–96		TFF First League	Adanaspor	2–1	Adana Demir
1995–96		TFF First League	Adana Demir	2–0	Adanaspor
1996–97		TFF First League	Adanaspor	1–0	Adana Demir
1996–97		TFF First League	Adana Demir	2–2	Adanaspor
2005-06		TFF Second League	Adanaspor	0–3	Adana Demir
2005-06		TFF Second League	Adana Demir	0–3	Adanaspor
2005-06		TFF Second League	Adanaspor	0–3	Adana Demir
2005-06		TFF Second League	Adana Demir	3–0	Adanaspor
2007-08	02.03.2008	TFF Second League	Adana Demir	1–0	Adanaspor
2007-08	04.05.2008	TFF Second League	Adanaspor	1–0	Adana Demir
2012-13	07.10.2012	TFF First League	Adana Demir	4–2	Adanaspor
2012-13	24.02.2013	TFF First League	Adanaspor	1–1	Adana Demir
2013-14	20.10.2013	TFF First League	Adanaspor	2–2	Adana Demir
2013-14	01.03.2014	TFF First League	Adana Demir	1–3	Adanaspor
2014-15	19.10.2014	TFF First League	Adanaspor	2–1	Adana Demir
2014-15	08.03.2015	TFF First League	Adana Demir	1–0	Adanaspor
2015-16	24.10.2015	TFF First League	Adana Demir	2–0	Adanaspor
2015-16	20.03.2016	TFF First League	Adanaspor	1–0	Adana Demir
2017-18	25.09.2017	TFF First League	Adana Demir	1–0	Adanaspor
2017-18	22.02.2018	TFF First League	Adanaspor	1–0	Adana Demir
2018-19	25.11.2018	TFF First League	Adana Demir	1–1	Adanaspor
2018-19	21.04.2019	TFF First League	Adanaspor	0–0	Adana Demir
2019-20	15.09.2019	TFF First League	Adanaspor	0–0	Adana Demir
2019-20	08.02.2020	TFF First League	Adana Demir	4–1	Adanaspor
2020-21	04.10.2020	TFF First League	Adana Demir	0–0	Adanaspor
2020-21	14.02.2021	TFF First League	Adanaspor	2–2	Adana Demir

Orange: Adanaspor win
Navy: Adana Demir win
Silver: Draw
Red: Adanaspor withdrew from the competition, thus Adana Demir wins 3-0 by de jure.
