= Adana Demirspor =

Multi-sports club in Turkey

- Full name: Adana Demirspor Kulübü A.Ş.
- Nickname: Mavi Şimşekler (The Blue Lightnings)
- Short name: ADS
- Founded: 28 December 1940; 85 years ago
- Stadium: New Adana Stadium
- Capacity: 30,960
- President: Ertan Zeybek
- Head coach: Volkan Bekiroğlu
- League: TFF 2. Lig
- 2025–26: TFF 1. Lig, 20th of 20 (relegated)
- Website: www.adanademirspor.org.tr
Home colours	Away colours	Third colours

Adana Demirspor Kulübü is a multi-sports club based in Adana, Turkey. The football department is the most popular department, which was relegated to TFF 1. Lig on 16 March 2025 after 4 seasons at the Super Lig. Founded by railway workers of Turkish State Railways (TCDD) in 1940, the football team's success at the Adana League and the water polo team's unbeaten National League titles in the club's first three decades built a large worker fan base in the city. Some supporters who were unhappy with the management of the club founded Adanaspor in 1954, and competition among the two clubs for the citywide support and domination since then, created one of the fiercest rivalries of Turkish football which continues to this day as the Adana derby. They currently play in the TFF 2. Lig, following back-to back relegations, with one of them being administrative.

Adana Demirspor was the first club based outside of Istanbul, Ankara, or İzmir to join the National Football League in the 1960–61 season, before this the league games were only hosted in the three cities. The water polo team was the first champions of the Turkish Water Polo League and had dominated the first three decades of the league, winning 21 league titles in 25 years, from the early 1940s to mid 1960s.

Adana Demirspor are by far the most successful of the 38 Demirspor clubs that are founded by the employees of the Turkish State Railways (TCDD). Most Demirspor clubs have jersey colours identical to Adana Demirspor, and bear the TCDD symbol on their logo. Ankara Demirspor are the only other Demirspor club that compete in the Turkish professional football league system, and the only ones still affiliated with the TCDD.

== History ==
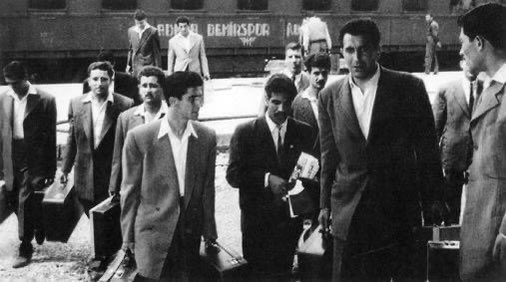
Players arriving home with the wagon designated for the club

Turkish State Railways (TCDD) had begun sports activities in 1930 with the foundation of Eskişehir Demirspor. İzmir Demirspor, Ankara Demirspor, Kayseri Demirspor and Istanbul (Haydarpaşa) Demirspor were founded in following years.

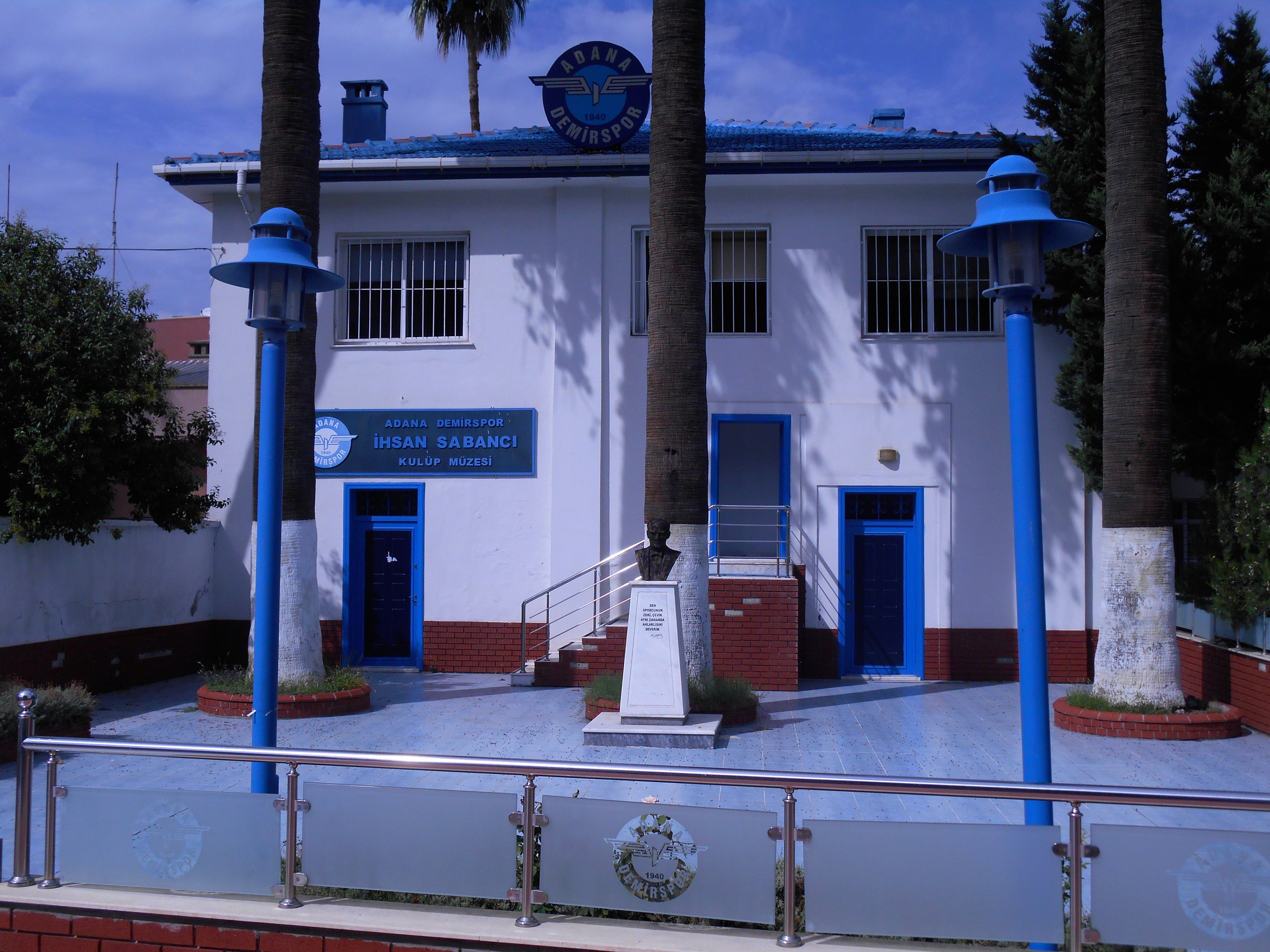
First club office at the Railway Station (now Football Academy)

Turkish law of National Defence Obligation came into effect with the upcoming Second World War to prepare civil youth for the possible entry of Turkey to war. The law required the institutions, that have over 500 employees to found sports clubs. This law accelerated the sports activities of TCDD and 33 more Demirspor clubs were founded in almost every major station. The foundation of Adana Demirspor was laid down in 1938 by TCDD Adana Headquarters (6th Region). First Club General Meeting was held at the Station building on 12 January 1940. After 2 years' preparation, Region Chief Eşref Demirağ, Vasfı Ramzan, Hasan Silah, Hikmet Tezel, Feridun Kuzeybay, Seha Keyder, Emin Ersan, Esat Gürkan, Kenan Gülgün and 500 TCDD employees founded the club on 28 December 1940. Eşref Demirağ was elected the first President and held this position until 1946. TCDD 6th Region Chiefs held the president seat until 1969 and Board of Directors were formed from the directors, supervisors and other employees of the 6th Region.

Football, Athletics, Cycling, Wrestling, Swimming and Waterpolo departments were opened with the foundation. A building at the Adana Railway Station was converted into Club House and a training ground was built next to it. A TCDD wagon was designated for Adana Demirspor which was connected to trains that take club teams to away games.

=== 1941 to 1960: Waterpolo Unbeatables & Adana Football Masters ===
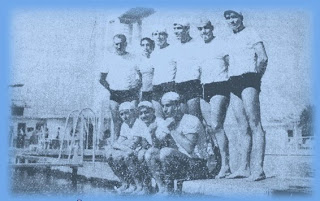
Waterpolo team in 1940s. Muharrem Gülergin, standing first left

Adana Demirspor waterpolo team joined the Turkish Waterpolo League in 1942 at the same year, Turkey's newest Swimming Complex had opened in Adana. From 1942 to 1965, Adana Demirspor had won the Waterpolo League title for 21 times, without losing a game at 17 of the 21 seasons. Under the leadership of club legend Muharrem Gülergin, 40 players, who earlier developed their swimming skills at water canals of Adana and then joined the club at the swimming complex, became known as the Unbeatables nationwide. Other than waterpolo, these players also broke national and international records in swimming.

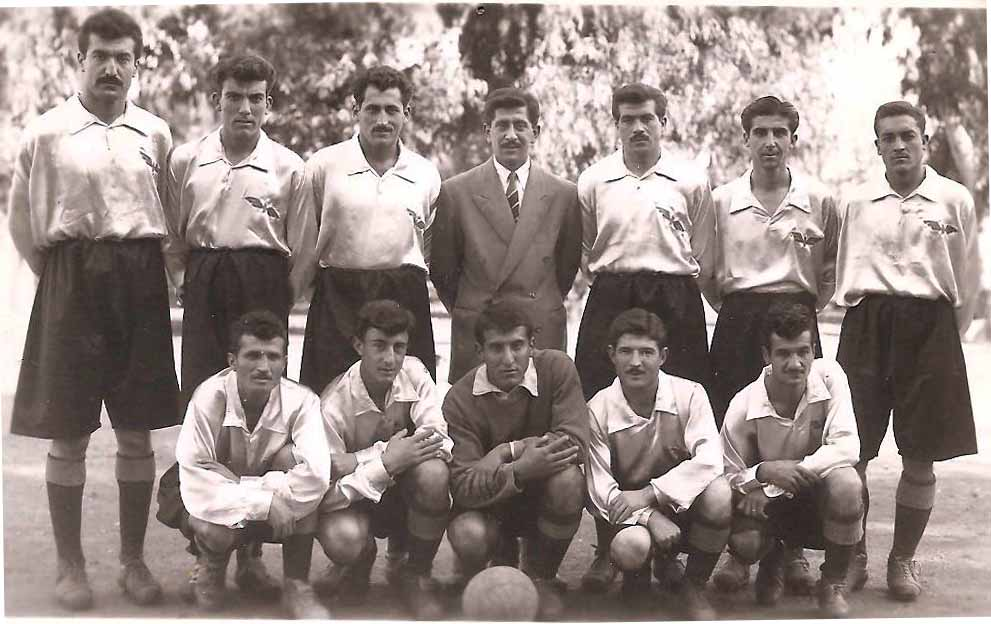
Football team in early 1940s was formed from railway workers

Adana Demirspor joined the Adana Football League in 1941. The league, which also known as Çukurova League, was founded as a first-tier semi-professional league in 1924 consisting clubs from Adana, Mersin and later Hatay, Maraş and Malatya Provinces. Adana Demirspor won the league title for the first time at 1942–43 season. ADS won the league title a record of 15 times in 17 seasons from 1942 to 1959.

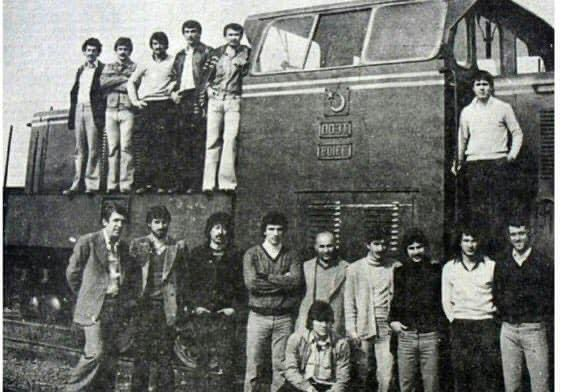
Team having the classic locomotive pose

Adana Demirspor was qualified for the Turkish Amateur Championship for the first time in 1943 and joined every year that they won the Adana title. The club secured the National Third Spot in 1947 at the finals in Ankara, behind Ankara Demirspor and Fenerbahçe. ADS were the National Third again in 1951 at the finals in Balıkesir, behind Beşiktaş and Altay. ADS won the Turkish Amateur Championship in 1954 after defeating Hacettepe 1–0, with Selami Tekkazancı (Füze Selami) scoring the only goal. Adana League was upgraded to fully professional league in 1955, thus Adana Demirspor football team upgraded to a pro-team. As Turkish National League was founded in 1959, Adana League was downgraded to a Second Tier League.

=== 1961 to 1984: Multi-sports success ===
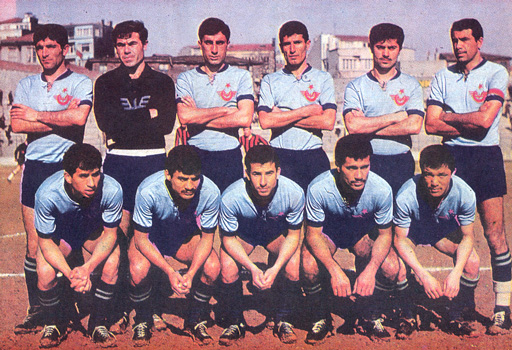
Adana Demirspor in 1966-67

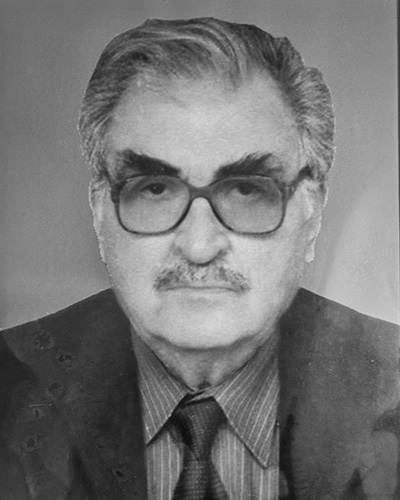
Mahmut Karabucak is the first President after TCDD

Turkey did not have a nationwide professional league until 1959, instead, teams competed in regional leagues like Adana, Ankara, Eskişehir, İzmir, Kayseri, and Trabzon. The Milli Lig, known today as the Süper Lig, was founded in 1959. The league consisted of eight clubs from Istanbul, and four clubs each from Ankara and İzmir. Adana Demirspor had promoted to the Milli Lig at the third season (1960–61), becoming the first club outside the three largest cities. The rules at that time, did not allow games to be played outside of Istanbul, Ankara and Izmir, thus Adana Demirspor had to play their home games in Ankara, turning every game into an away game. Without fan support and with difficulties of long trips, ADS could not stay long at the National League, as they relegated back to Adana League, after finishing last place with 18 points in the first season. The club returned to Adana League at 1961–62 season, where they competed for another two years.

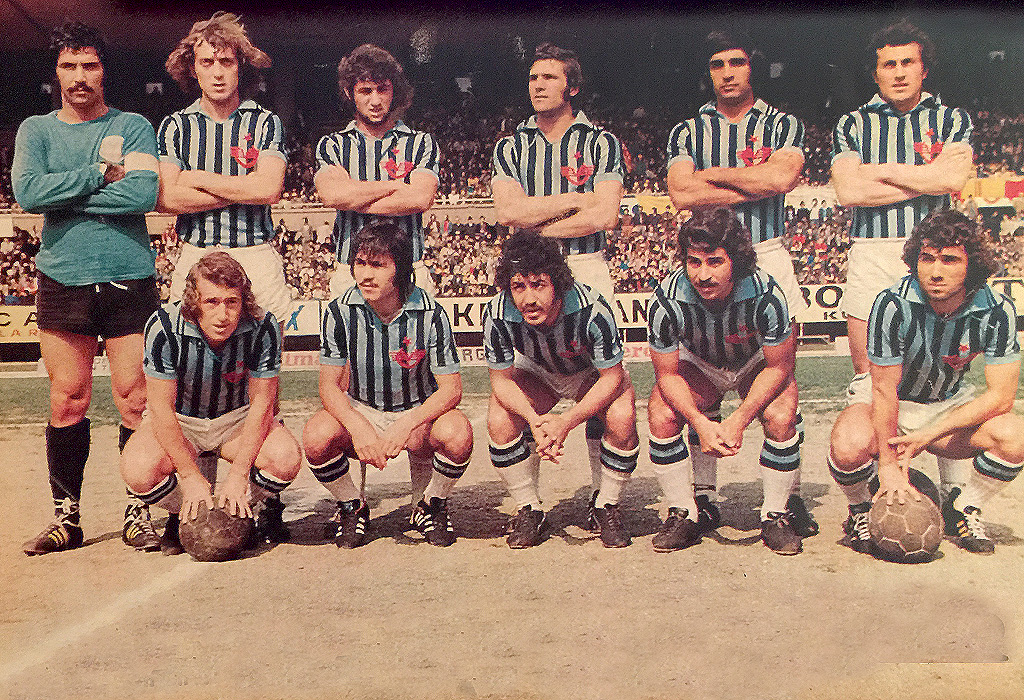
Adana Demirspor in 1973. Fatih Terim standing third, club loyal Rasin Gürcan sitting second, both from left.

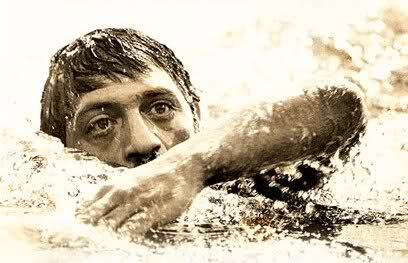
Erdal Acet broke the record of swimming La Manche

The second tier (2.Lig) of the Milli Lig was founded in 1963, and Adana Demirspor were one of the founder clubs of the league. ADS were the Runner-up of the first season (1963-64) of the 2.Lig, though could not promote to top tier. TCDD put an end to governing ADS, and in 1969, businessmen Mahmut Karabucak was elected the first president outside of TCDD. Adana Demirspor had competed in the 2. Lig for nine years and had promoted to 1. Lig for the second time at the 1972–73 season. They secured promotion after defeating Uşakspor 2–0, with goals from Fatih Terim and Bektaş Yurttasın.

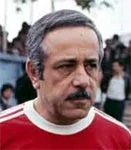
Coşkun Özarı carried ADS to 6th in football

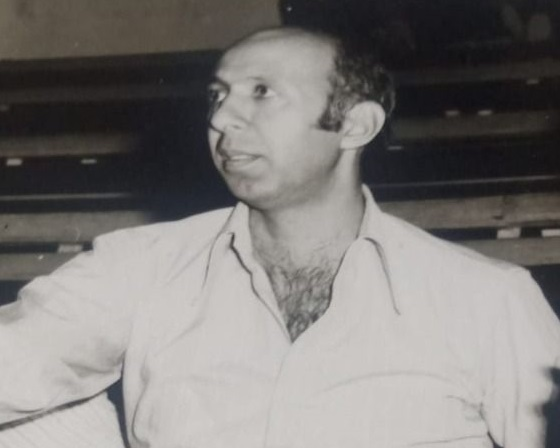
Demiray Sayılır led ADS basketball to First Tier

Adana Demirspor secured the 10th position at the Turkish Top Tier 1973-1974 season and with Adanaspor already at the Top Tier, Adana was the first city, outside the three league founder cities, to hold two clubs and to host derby games at the top tier. ADS secured mid-positions at the top tier until 1981 and reached the finals of the 1977–78 Turkish Cup. Demirspor lost the first leg of the final with a 3–0 score, and failed to comeback in the second leg, drawing 0–0 with Trabzonspor. They met Trabzonspor in a cup final once more that year, this time in the Prime Minister's Cup, but would go on to lose 2–1. Hacı Döner was elected the President in 1979 and soon after Coşkun Özarı was hired as the Head Coach. ADS reached its apex when the club finished sixth in the 1981–82 season with Coşkun Özarı. This season was Adana Demirspor's the best result till finishing fourth in the 2022–23 season. ADS had also performed well at the following season securing the 7th position. Adana Demirspor were at the Top Tier straight for 11 years, after relegating to Second Tier at 1983–84 season with a goal difference.

Adana Demirspor water polo team won the 21st title of Turkish Water polo First Tier in 1965. This was the last title and ADS continued competing at water polo throughout 1970s. ADS swimmer Erdal Acet broke the record of swimming La Manche in 9 hours 12 minutes on 1 September 1976. He improved the record by 8 minutes a year later. ADS basketball promoted to the Turkish Basketball First Tier in 1973. After playing one season, basketball team relegated to Second Tier. ADS promoted to First Tier again in 1976.

=== 1984 to 1995: First-Second Tier fluctuations ===
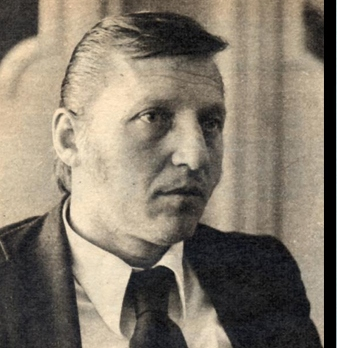
Metin Türel coached football team at four spells.

Adana Demirspor were grouped into 2.Lig Group A with other clubs east of Ankara at the 1984–85 season. ADS could not start the Second Tier journey well as they finished 9th that season. Next season, Metin Türel was hired as the coach and ADS had a head to head to run for promotion with Diyarbakırspor. On the 28th match week, 4 games to the end, ADS was the group leader, and had a game against Diyarbakırspor at a rough environment in Diyarbakır. ADS played with fear and were attacked on the field. Diyarbakırspor won the game with a 2–1 score, took the group leadership and promoted to top tier at the end of the season. ADS had an excellent performance at the following 1986–87 season, again at Group A, promoting to First Tier at the end of the season with 10 point lead. Ali Hoşfikirer coached the team at the second half-season.

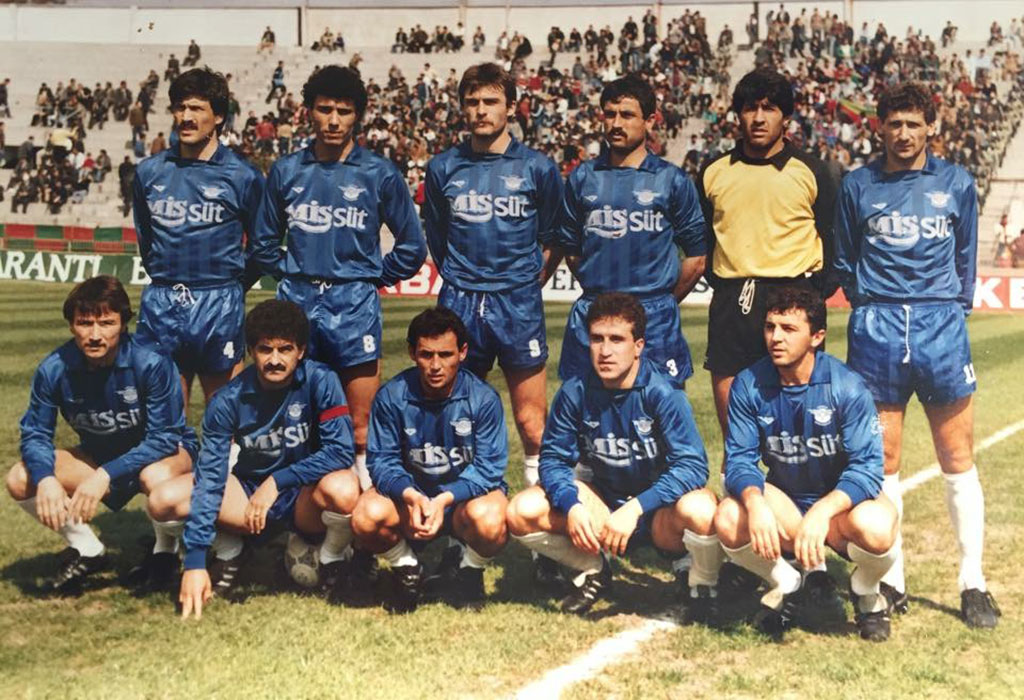
Adana-Demirspor in 1988. Zijad Svrakic standing first, club product Tekin İncebaldır sitting third, both from right.

Adana Demirspor hired Fuad Muzurovic as the new coach at the third First Tier spell. ADS had completed the 1987–88 season at 10th position and Zijad Svrakic scored 22 goals. Scoring 16 more goals at the following season, Svrakic is the all-time First Tier goal scorer of ADS, in one season and in total. ADS barely saved from relegation at the following 1988–89 season after defeating Karşıyaka 2–1 at the last game. ADS had a very low performance at the 1989–90 season, getting locked at the relegation zone most of the time and relegating to Second Tier weeks before the season end.

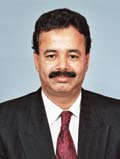
Former president Muhammet Kaymak

Adana Demirspor was placed into Group C at the Second Tier 1990–91 season, with other clubs from Eastern Turkey. Under the leadership of coach Ali Hoşfikirer, ADS had a very successful season, winning all the home games except one and having several away wins. ADS led the group most of the season and won the League title with 8-points ahead of Malatyaspor. Adana Demirspor did not start their fourth spell of the First Tier well and performed poorly throughout the 1991-92 season, winning only 5 times and relegating back to Second Tier with 8-points short to relegating zone.

Second Tier 1992–93 season has gone through structural changes, where clubs were placed into 5 groups, first two of each group to be qualified to the Promotion Group. ADS was placed at Group 5 and finished the group third and could not qualify to Promotion Group with goal difference. At Second Tier's 1993–94 season, ADS was again at Group 5, this time qualifying to the Promotion Group. After securing the fifth position at the Promotion Group, ADS had promoted again to First Tier after defeating Çanakkale Dardanelspor at the play-off final. Adana Demirspor's fifth spell of Turkish First Tier at 1994–95 season had started good. ADS found themselves at the 5th position at the 5th week, with 3 wins and Fernand Coulibaly starring with 4 goals, in 5 games. On 2 October 1994, at the 7th match week, ADS had a game against Ankaragücü. ADS played good at the first 60 minutes and lead the game with 2–1 score. The biased referee, Nedim Göklü, sent off 2 ADS players at 42nd and 52nd minutes which lead to ADS to concede 2 goals in the last 30 minutes and losing the game with 2–3 score. ADS fans rioted after the game which caused ADS to have 2 home games ban. ADS could not relieve from the effects of the Ankaragücü game rest of the league, and could only get 6 points in 27 games and relegated to Second Tier weeks before the league end. 15 points that ADS received at the 1994–95 season was the lowest season points ever at the First Tier.

=== 1995 to 2018: Second-Third Tier fluctuations ===
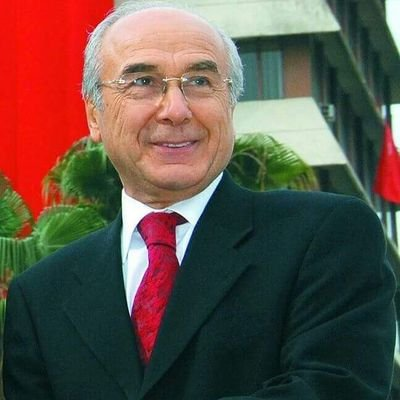
Aytaç Durak is the longest serving President.

Adana Demirspor's decline that started at the First Tier 1994–95 season, continued to the club's fifth spell of the Second Tier. At the 1995–96 season, ADS finished Group 3 closer to the relegation zone. The next season (1996-97 season) at the Second Tier, ADS was closer to relegation zone at the start, but improved at the second half-season and missed the play-off chance for promotion. 1997–98 season was another season that ADS could not qualify for the Promotion Group and did poorer at the second half-season and slightly relieved from relegation. At the next season (1998-99 season), ADS's decline continued, performed poorly towards the end of the season and relegated to Third Tier (then 3. Lig) for the first time in the history.

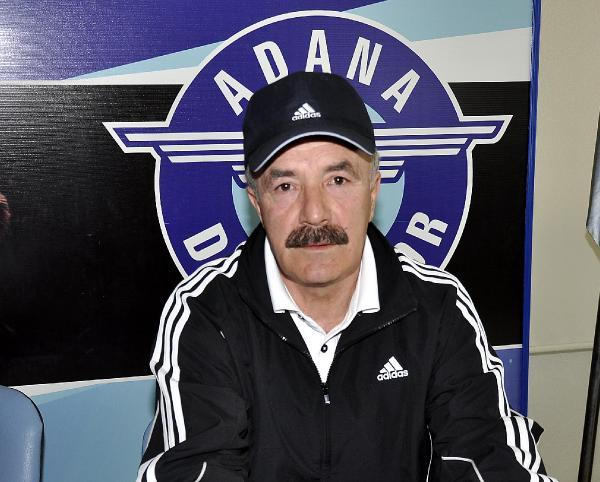
Ercan Albay is the longest serving football coach.

Adana Demirspor could not recover much at the start of the first spell of the Third Tier (3.Lig) and finished the 1999–00 season at middle position. Aytaç Durak was elected the President at end of the season, and Ercan Albay was appointed as the coach soon after. With the new management, ADS could relieve from the decline and performed well throughout the 2000–01 season and qualified to the newly created 2.Lig Category B. At the 2001–02 season, 2.Lig Category B became the new Third Tier, and 3.Lig was downgraded to a Fourth Tier league. This was not a promotion for ADS as they were still at the Third Tier. With Ercan Albay's leadership, Adana Demirspor had a good start to the Group 3 of the new league's 2001–02 season and finished fourth at the first half-season. ADS finished the second half-season of Group 3 at the top, after a very close race with Sarıyer, and qualified to play-off stage. After defeating Şanlıurfaspor at the quarter-finals and Türk Telekom at the semi-finals, ADS played the final game in Denizli against Karşıyaka. Adana Demirspor defeated Karşıyaka with a fine golden goal from Taner Demirbaş at the extra-time and returned to Second Tier (then 2.Lig Category A) after three years.

Adana Demirspor secured a mid-position at the first season (2002-03 season) of the sixth spell of the Second Tier. At the 2003–04 season, Adana Demirspor did not perform well, sacked Ercan Albay after 4 years of service, though still faced relegation to Third Tier with 1 point short of Mersin İdman Yurdu. Taner Demirbaş was the top figure during these years, scoring 84 goals in 90 games for ADS from 2000 to 2003.

Adana Demirspor's second spell of the Third Tier started with an average performance, finishing fifth at the 2004–05 season and fifth again at the 2005–06 season. At the 2006–07 season, ADS qualified to the Promotion Group after finishing Group 5 at the top. ADS qualified to the play-off stage after missing promotion with a goal difference. At the play-off stage, ADS reached the final, though lost 5–1 to Giresunspor at the final game. The 2007-08 was similar to the previous season for ADS who again qualified to the Promotion Group and finished the Promotion Group third. At the play-off stage, ADS reached the final again, this time losing 1–0 to Güngören Belediyespor with a last minute goal. Mehmet Gökoğlu was elected the President and Metin Yıldız was hired as coach at the start of the 2008–09 season. The new board wanted to start from scratch, dismissing more than 25 players and forming a brand new team. ADS had an average performance at this season and finished at mid-position. At the start of the 2009–10 season, Bekir Çınar was the new president and Hüseyin Özcan was the new coach. ADS qualified to the Promotion Group after finishing the group stage at the top. ADS reached the play-off stage for the third time, though got knocked out after losing to Tavşanlı Linyitspor at the first round. At the 2010–11 season, Third Tier was reformed and the league was renamed as 2.Lig. Groups were reduced to two and Promotion Group was scrapped. ADS finished the Kırmızı Group fifth and qualified to the play-off stage for the fourth time. After defeating Yeni Malatyaspor at the first round, ADS lost to Bandırmaspor at the second round and knocked out of play-offs. Lig. At the 2011–12 season, ADS finished the Kırmızı Group third and qualified to the play-off stage for the fifth time at this Third Tier spell. After defeating Balıkesirspor and Bugsaşspor at the play-off first and second rounds, ADS was at the final game again in Denizli. ADS defeated Fethiyespor 2–1 on 31 May 2012 and got promoted to the Second Tier after eight years.

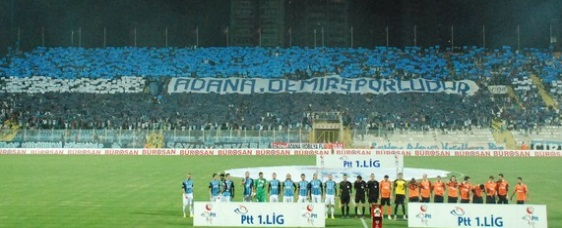
'Adana supports Demirspor' discourse at the 2012 Adana Derby

After poor results at the first five week of the 2012-13 season, ADS' seventh spell of the Second Tier, Adana Demirspor hired Mustafa Uğur as the new coach. The following game was against Adanaspor, ADS won the derby 4–2, bringing the score to 4-0 just in 39 minutes. Good results continued after and ADS had gained qualification to the play-off round at the first season of this spell. ADS lost to Manisaspor at the semi-final and missed promotion. 2013-14 season of ADS did not go well, as the club changed three coaches and finished the season at 13th spot. At the end of the season, Selahattin Aydoğdu was elected the president and ADS formed a brand new team with many loaned young players. Ünal Karaman was hired as the new coach. ADS had a good 2014-15 season and competed for the two spots for direct promotion until the 29th week. Poor results afterwards, took ADS to the play-off rounds for promotion. ADS lost to Antalyaspor at the semi-finals. Adana Demirspor had a good start to the 2015-16 season with coach Osman Özköylü. ADS finished the season fourth with up and down performance and twice coach change. At the play-off round with coach Yılmaz Vural, ADS knocked out Elazığspor at the semi-finals. At the final, ADS met Alanyaspor in Konya and missed promotion after penalty shoot-outs. ADS had a low performance at the following 2016-17 season, could only go up the 9th spot throughout the season and barely relieved from relegation by finishing at 14th spot. During this season, the club was heavily in debt due to corruption, got a (-3) point fine and banned from transferring new players for the first time in the history. After two years' of Sedat Sözlü's presidency, Mehmet Gökoğlu was elected the president at the end of the season. ADS started the new 2017-18 season with an average performance, though found themselves at the relegation zone after the mid-season and gained momentum towards the end and finished the season at 13th spot. ADS faced eviction from the main training ground in Yüreğir as it was built on a state land. Then Adana MP Jülide Sarıeroğlu took responsibility with ongoing problems, solved the eviction issue as ADS signed a long-term lease agreement with Milli Emlak (National Property Foundation). She also convinced the business giant Murat Sancak to become the new president of the club for better management and to recover from bans, fines and liens.

=== 2018 to date: Grade in Football ===
Murat Sancak was elected the President on 4 July 2018. Adana Demirspor formed a brand new team within a short time by spending heavy, bringing world known players to Second Tier. At the 2018-19 season, ADS worked with 3 coaches and could hardly qualify for the play-off round with coach Ümit Özat. ADS was knocked out by losing to Hatayspor at the semi-final with a last minute goal. Next season (2019-20 season), ADS was better than the previous season, even had the chance to directly promote to First Tier, unluckily finished the season 3rd and qualified to the play-off rounds for the fifth time at this Second Tier spell and 11th time at this millennium. ADS knocked out Bursaspor at the semi-final and though missed promotion after losing to Karagümrük after penalty shoot-outs. ADS targeted first two spots for direct promotion at the following 2020-21 season. After getting 10 points apart from the 2nd spot, Samet Aybaba was hired as the coach. ADS collected 31 points in 11 games, finished the season 1st and promoted to the First Tier (Super Lig) after 26 years of absence.

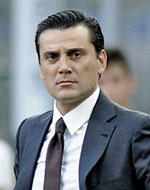
Vincenzo Montella led the grade in football

It was the sixth promotion of Adana Demirspor, who joined Göztepe and Karşıyaka in holding the record number of promotions to the First Tier. This promotion was also the 16th league fluctuation since 1960, playing six times at the First Tier, seven times at the Second Tier, twice at the Third Tier and once at the Adana League. ADS started the 2021-22 season, the sixth spell of the First Tier, with contracting many talented players including Mario Balotelli, who re-gained his form and success after many years. The club started the season with the current coach Samet Aybaba, though they had a coach change at the fifth week, and Vincenzo Montella was hired as the new Head Coach. Montella carried the team to a spectacular era, reaching the third spot many weeks of the second half-season and finishing ninth at the end of the season. Adana Demirspor with Montella, reached its apex when the club finished 4th in the 2022–23 season and qualified for the European competitions for the first time in the history. Vincenzo Montella did not re-new his contract for the 2023–24 season and Patrick Kluivert was hired as the new coach of football. ADS had a good start to the UEFA Conference League, knocking out Cluj and Osijek at the second and third round, though they were eliminated from the competition at the play-off round, after penalty shoot-out against Genk.

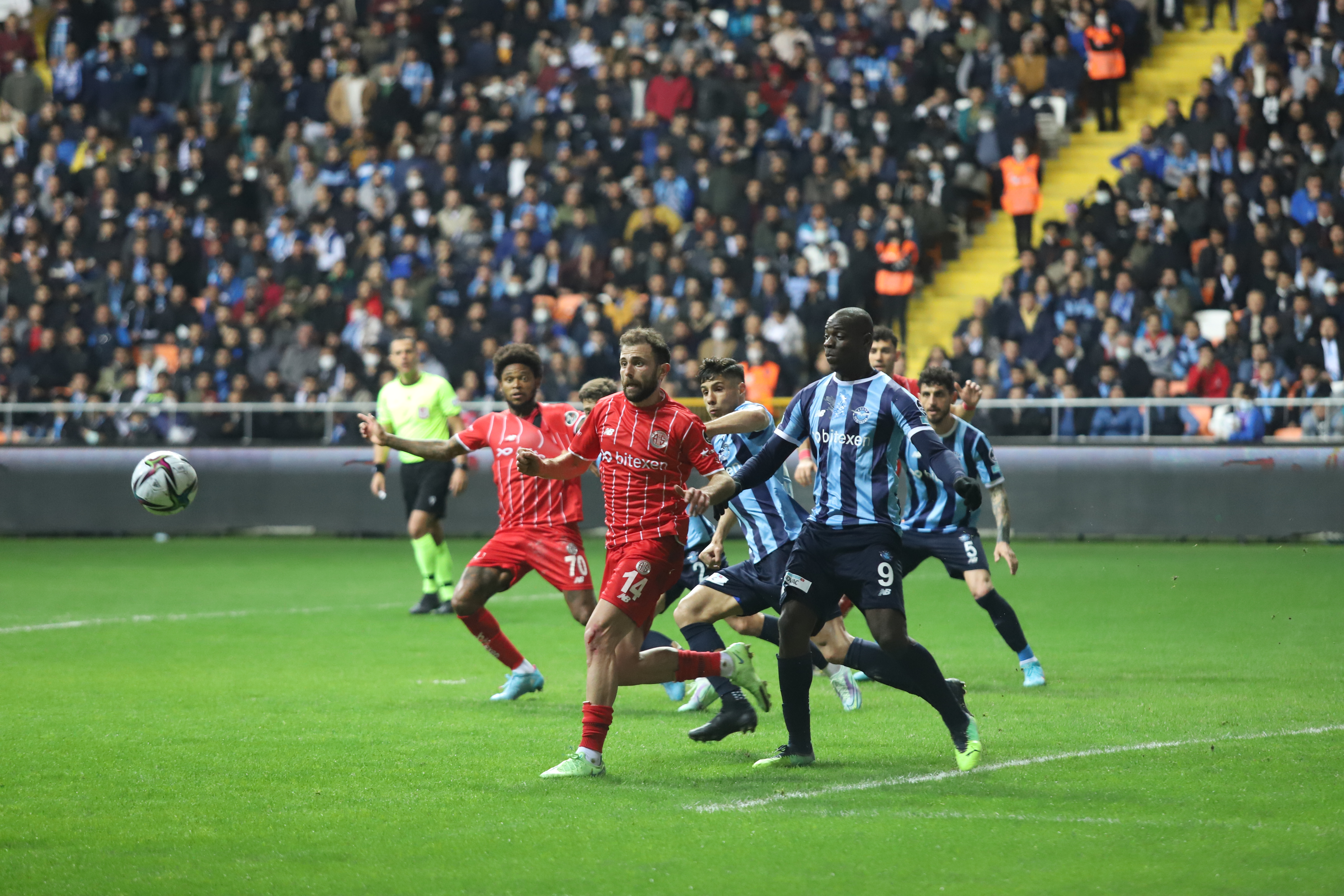
Mario Balotelli scored 19 goals at his first season.

After the good start of the season in European qualifications and the early weeks of the Turkish league, the circumstances have changed dramatically, and the performance of the team got worse in weeks. On 4 December 2023, the club and Kluviert parted ways. But the problem was not only in the pitch; the financial situation of the club also collapsed slowly. In January 2024, FIFA announced that the club would be banned from making any further transfers for three windows. Since the transfer ban announcements are updated weekly, this information was removed shortly afterwards, but then renewed with new decisions and many players leaving the team towards the end of the season; finally, a major ban came for the 2024-25 season.

After Kluivert, the club did not immediately appointed a new coach. In the following weeks, Serkan Damla prepared the team for the upcoming matches. Also, youth coach Cengiz Hoşfikirer officially took part in the records and participated in press statements. Despite the initial announcement that Damla would remain in his role, Hikmet Karaman was appointed as coach on 18 January 2024, following a period of unsuccessful results.

Led by Hikmet Karaman, the team did not develop as expected, and subsequently fell towards the relegation zone during the season. There were significant changes at the end of the first half of the season, with numerous prominent players from the outset departing the squad. Beside unpaid debts issue, Murat Sancak received consecutive penalties due to his harsh statements about the Federation and referees during the season. Then he officially handed over the presidency. However, the new president Metin Korkmaz has not made an official statement regarding the team's situation. Sancak continued to make statements about the team and the TFF on his personal X account. In particular, following the 1-6 home defeat to Gaziantep FK in the 36th week, Sancak had been engaged in a dispute with the fans who making declarations against him and the future of the team. In the last home match, Başakşehir scored once again six goals to Adana Demirspor, marking the first time in the club's history that it had conceded such a number of goals in home in a row. Adana Demirspor finished the season in 12th place with 44 points, of which only 15 were collected in the second half.

The crisis went on in the new season. The transfer ban prevented the club from making any changes to the squad at the start of the 2024-25 season. This increased the fans' criticism of president Sancak, who returned to office in the summer. Michael Valkanis was hired as coach and the team began competing with a limited squad, comprising primarily youth and loan players from previous seasons. On 16 March 2025, ADS relegated to TFF 1.Lig, ten matchdays before the league end, after four seasons in the Super Lig.

== Stadium and facilities ==
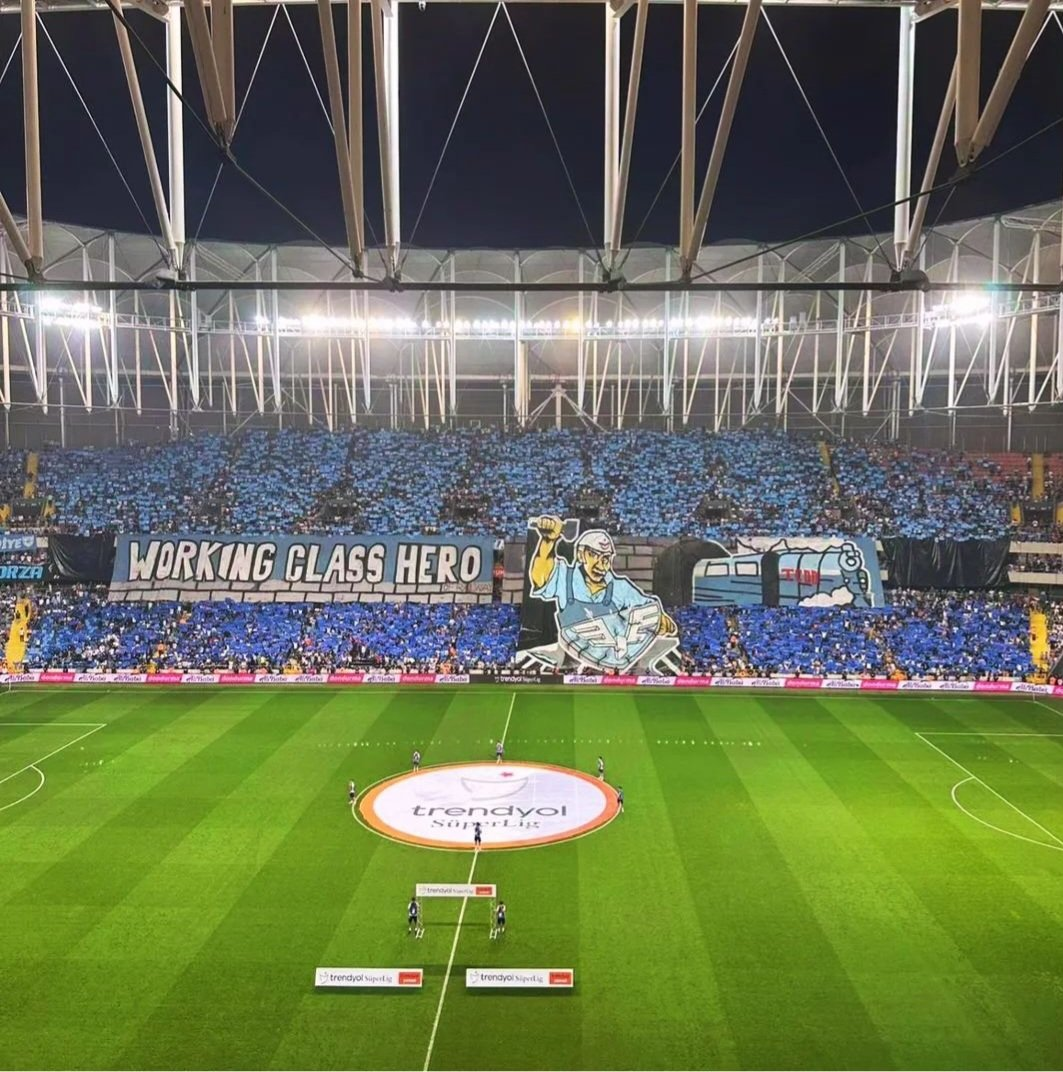
2024 Labour Day celebration of ADS supporters

Adana Demir's homeground is the Adana Stadium since March 2021. The stadium has a capacity of 30960 seats. The stadium's north seats are painted to Adana Demirspor's jersey colors and south seats are painted to Adanaspor's jersey colors. Şimşekler group gather at the North Stand, other fan groups tend to gather at the northern section of the East Stands. From 1940 to 2021, the football team played their home games at the now defunct 5 Ocak Stadium. The waterpolo team played their home games at the Atatürk Swimming Complex from 1940 to dissolution. Menderes Sports Hall hosted club's basketball and volleyball teams.

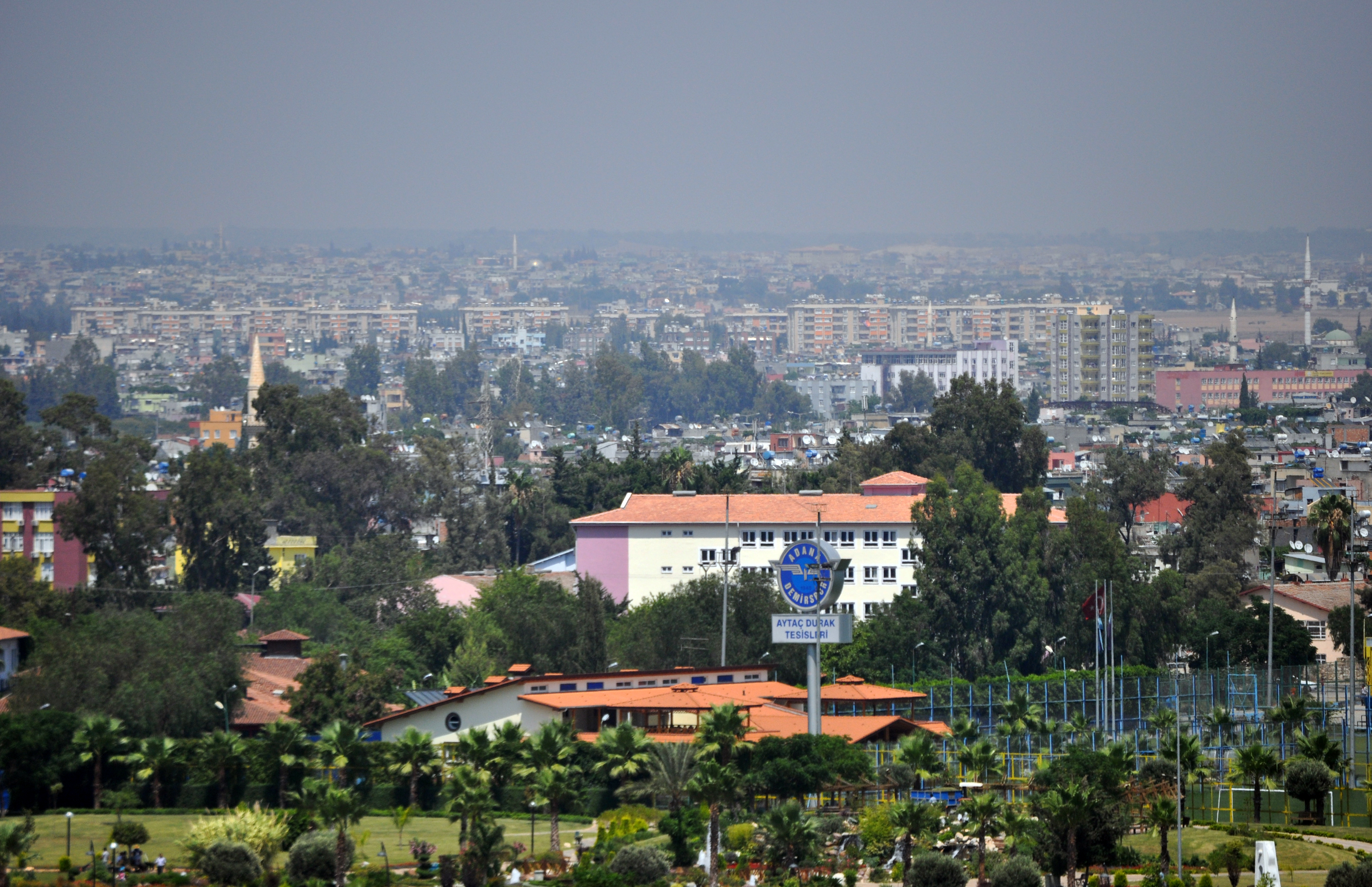
The main training ground in Yüreğir

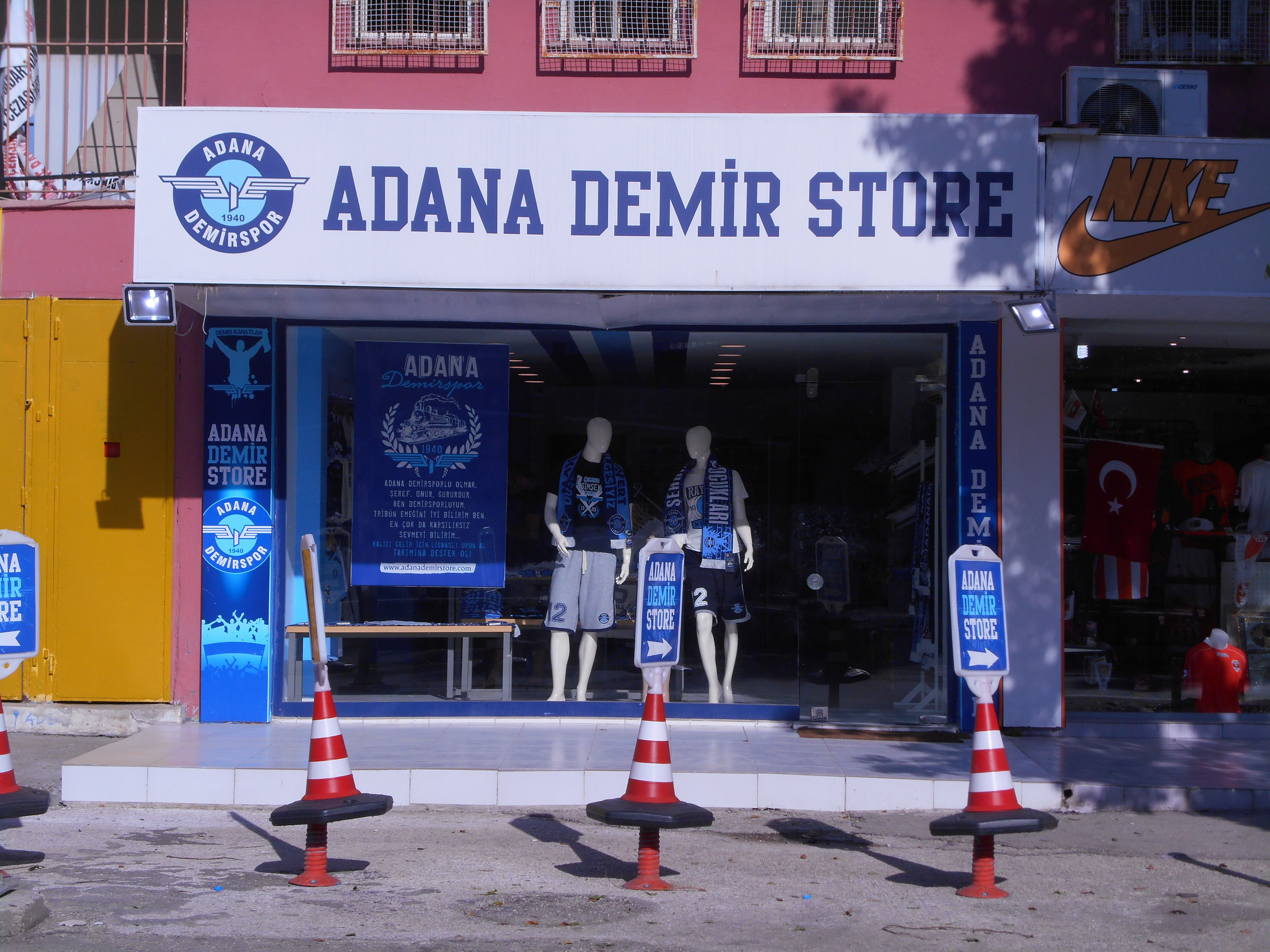
Club Store in Reşatbey

Adana Demir's main training ground is the "Adana Demirspor Tesisleri", along the Seyhan River bank in the Yüreğir district. The training ground was built by the Metropolitan Municipality on a state land in the early 2000s. It was named the Aytaç Durak Tesisleri to honour the long-time serving mayor of Adana, who lead the construction of the training ground. As it was built on a state land without a tenancy agreement, Milli Emlak (en:National Property Foundation) sent an eviction notice several times in the late 2010s. In March 2019, with the efforts of the Adana MP Jülide Sarıeroğlu, a tenancy agreement is finally made between ADS and the Milli Emlak which secured the training ground for a long-term and at the same time the facility is renamed the Adana Demirspor Tesisleri. The main training ground hosts the club's Head Office and is made of 4 football fields, Club store, fitness center, swimming pool and the staff-player residences.

Adana Demir youth teams train at the TCDD owned training ground at the Central railway station in Kurtuluş, Seyhan. The property, which is composed of a football field and Youth Office, is rented out to Adana Demir for free. ADS Club Museum which is next to the TCDD training ground, was the club's Head Office from 1940 to 2000. Adana Demir has three club stores, one at the main training ground, one at M1 mall and one at the Park Adana mall. The club store at the 5 Ocak Stadium in Reşatbey, moved a little further and is now run by the supporter group, Şimşekler.

== Support and rivalries ==
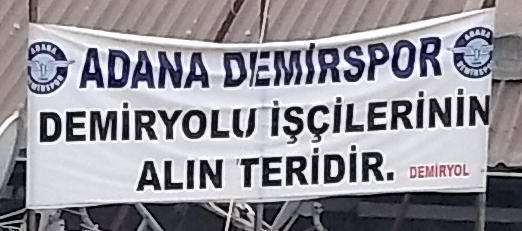
A banner at a TCDD facility: 'Adana Demirspor are the brow sweat of the railway workers.'

Adana Demirspor draw support from all over the city and as well as from the districts of the Adana Province. As being founded as a railway club, they are supported by the railway workers in Turkey. Politically left leaning people also have sympathy for the club.

The main supporters group is called Mavi Şimşekler, which translates to Blue lightnings. The fans are known to have a left-wing political stance, as result they have good relations with other left-wing teams such as Livorno and St Pauli. The archrivals are Adanaspor, who share the Adana Stadium with Adana Demirspor.

== Players ==
=== Football ===
Football department is the only department that survived the whole history of the club. The department is administered by Alper Aslan.

==== Current squad ====
As of 5 February 2026

Note: Flags indicate national team as defined under FIFA eligibility rules; some limited exceptions apply. Players may hold more than one non-FIFA nationality.

No.	Pos.	Nation	Player
2	DF	TUR	Enes Demirtaş
3	DF	TUR	Hasan Alp Kaya
4	DF	TUR	Aslan Atay
7	FW	TUR	Sefa Gülay
14	MF	TUR	Demir Yavuz
15	FW	TUR	Diyar Zengin
16	MF	TUR	Kürşat Türkeş Küçük (captain)
17	DF	TUR	Mert Menemencioğlu
18	FW	TUR	Ahmet Bolat
20	FW	TUR	Ahmet Arda Birinci
22	FW	TUR	Gökdeniz Tunç
23	DF	TUR	Yusuf Demirkıran
24	DF	TUR	Aykut Sarıkaya

No.	Pos.	Nation	Player
25	GK	TUR	Murat Eser
26	DF	TUR	Doğuhan Asım Dübüş
27	GK	TUR	Ata Gül
30	DF	TUR	Yücel Gürol
43	DF	TUR	Ali Fidan
61	DF	TUR	Ali Arda Yıldız
66	MF	TUR	Halil Eray Aktaş
77	FW	TUR	Osman Kaynak
80	MF	TUR	Ahmet Yılmaz
87	MF	TUR	Ulaş İmergi
88	MF	TUR	Kayra Saygan
99	GK	TUR	Eren Fidan

==== Current coaching staff ====
Position	Staff
Manager	(England) Koray Palaz
Assistant Manager	(Turkey) Afan Koçak
Goalkeeping Coach	(Turkey) Samet Eğribel

- Last updated: 30 September 2025
- Source:Technical staff

==== League affiliation ====
- UEFA Europa Conference League: (Note: Total of 1 seasons) 2023–24
- Turkish Football League: (Note: Total of 64 seasons) 1960–61, 1963–
  - First Tier (Süper Lig): (Note: Total of 21 seasons) 1960–61, 1973–1984, 1987–1990, 1991–92, 1994–95, 2021–2025
  - Second Tier (1.Lig): (Note: Total of 32 seasons) 1963–1973, 1984–1987, 1990–91, 1992–1994, 1995–1999, 2002–2004, 2012–2021, 2025-
  - Third Tier (2.Lig): (Note: Total of 11 seasons) 1999–2002, 2004–2012
- Adana Football League: (Note: Total of 21 seasons) 1941–1960, 1961–1963

===== European Competitions =====
As of match played 31 August 2023

Competition	P	W	D	L	GF	GA	GD
UEFA Europa Conference League	6	3	1	2	12	8	+4
Total	6	3	1	2	12	8	+4

P = Matches played; W = Matches won; D = Matches drawn; L = Matches lost; GF = Goals for; GA = Goals against; GD = Goals difference.

UEFA Europa Conference League

Season	Round	Club	Home	Away	Aggregate
2023–24	Q2	(Romania) CFR Cluj	2–1	1–1	3–2
2023–24	Q3	(Croatia) Osijek	5–1	2–3	7–4
2023–24	PO	(Belgium) Genk	1–0	1–2	2–2 (p. 4–5)

UEFA ranking history:

As of 13 July 2024

Season	Rank	Points	Ref.
2024	166 ▲	6.720	

===== Turkish Football League =====
League Spots

=== Swimming and water polo ===
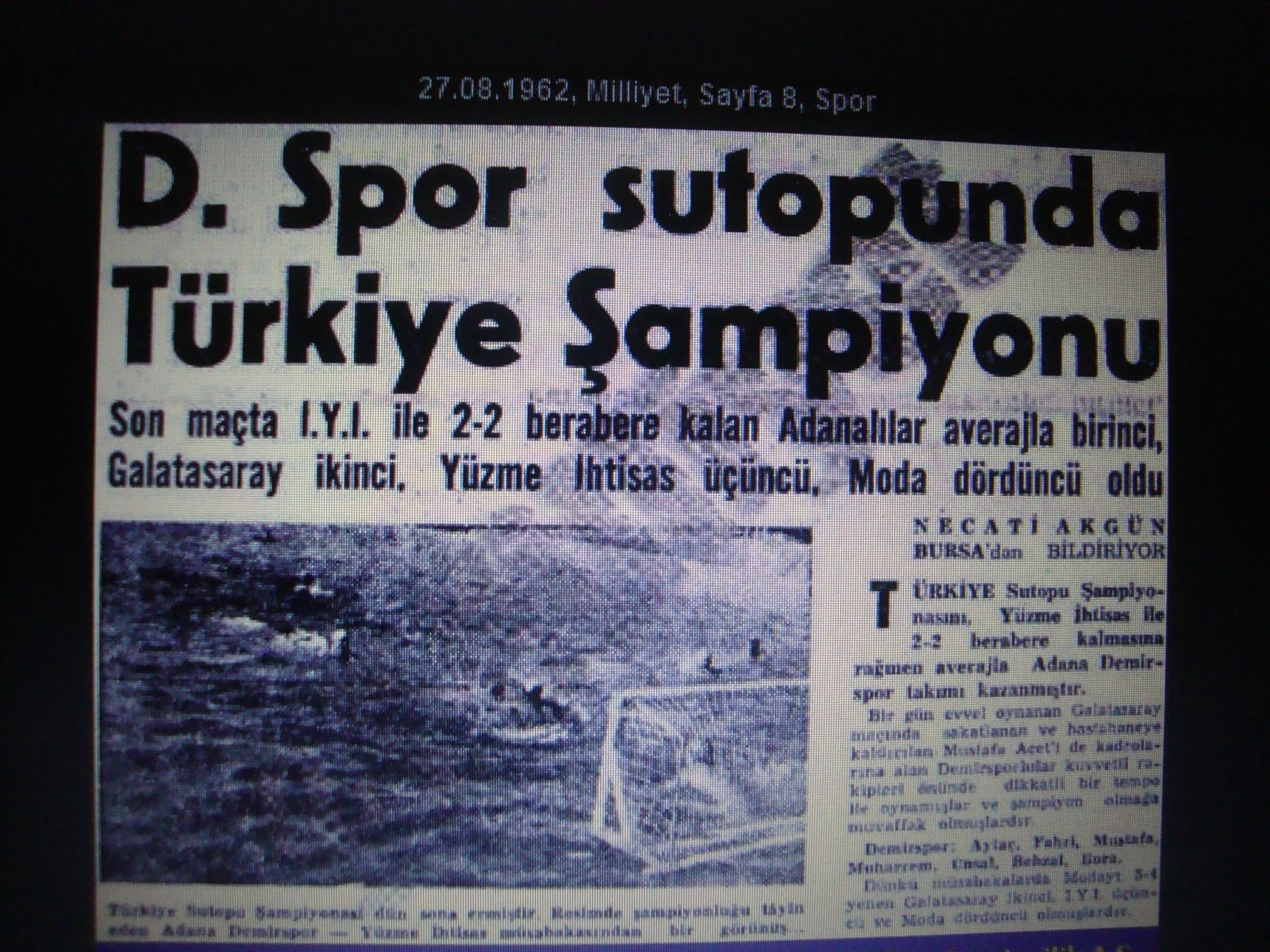
Adana Demirspor are water polo champions in 1962

Atatürk Swimming Complex, the largest swimming pool of the time, had opened in Adana in 1938 with the efforts of the Adana Mayor Turhan Cemal Beriker and the Regional Sports Director Rıza Salih Saray. Adana Demirspor formed the swimming and water polo team from 40 youngsters who developed their swimming skills at the irrigation canals in the city. Adana Demir had joined the Turkish Water polo League in 1942, playing their home games at the new complex. From 1942 to 1954, the club had 13 League titles, without losing a game. They had another 8 titles until 1965, bringing the number of league titles to 21. After all this success, Adana Demirspor water polo team has known as Unbeatables, for several decades. Muharrem Gülergin, son of a railway worker, became a legend for the club for his leadership at the water polo team. Erdal Acet broke the record of swimming Canal La Manche (English Channel) in 9 hours and 2 minutes in 1976.

==== League affiliation ====
- Turkish Waterpolo League: 38 years/ 1942–1980

=== Basketball ===
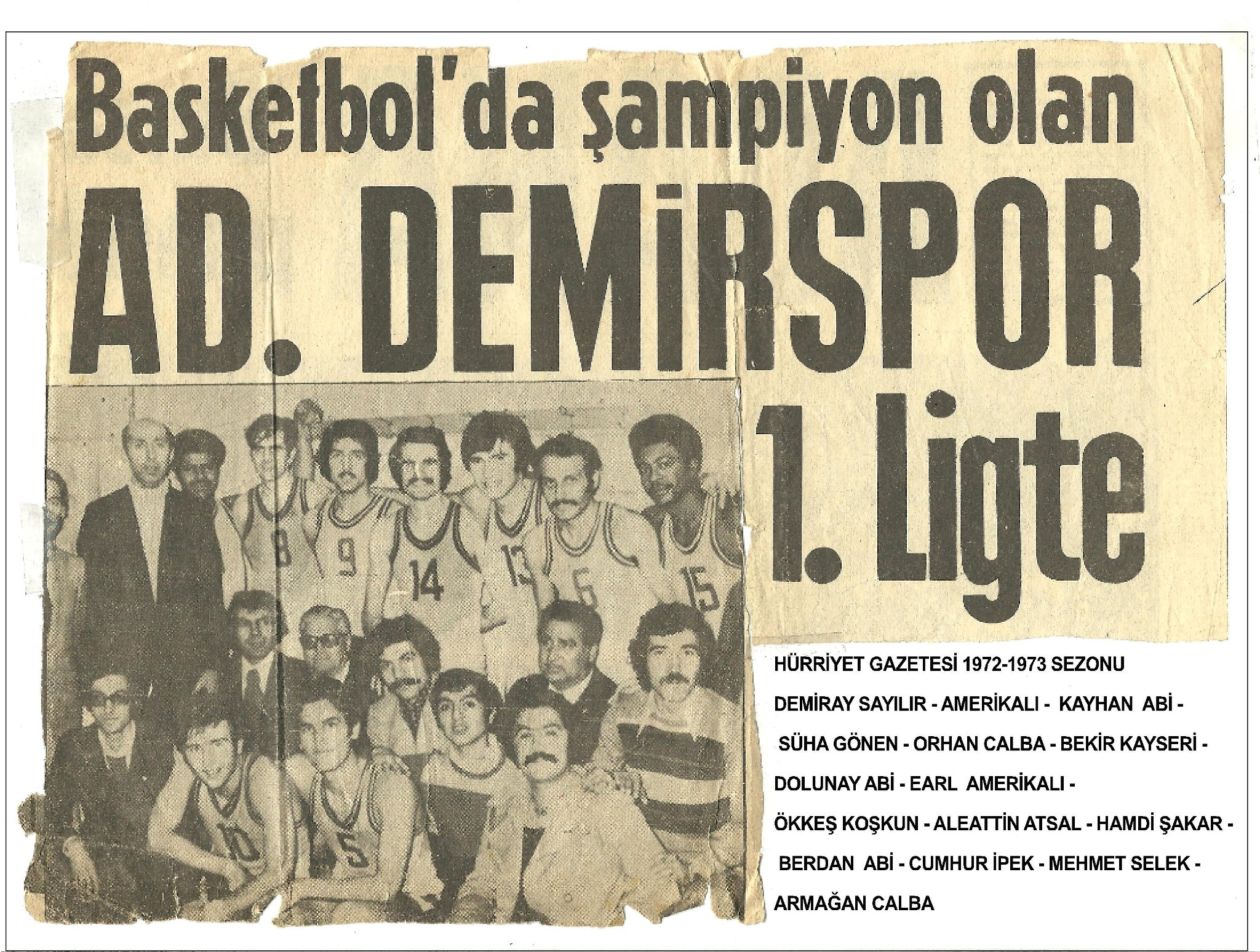
ADS basketball team at First Tier

Basketball department was founded by Alaettin Atsal and Demiray Sayılır and have first appeared in Turkish League in 1968. Adana Demirspor have won the Anatolian Cup title at 1969–1970 season and were promoted to the Turkish Basketball First League. The club were promoted to the Basketball Super League at 1972-1973 after winning a highly competitive season. The department had dissolved in the 1980s and had re-opened in 2003, competing at the Regional League for some years.

==== League affiliation ====
- Turkish Basketball League: (Note: Total of 10 seasons) 1970–1980
  - First Tier (Basketbol Süper Ligi): (Note: Total of 2 seasons) 1973–74, 1975–76
  - Second Tier (Türkiye Basketbol Ligi): (Note: Total of 8 seasons) 1970–73, 1974–1975, 1976–1980

==== First Tier Performance ====
Season	Rank	G	W	D	L	GF	GA	Pts
1973-1974	11	21	4	0	17	1369	1645	29
1975-1976	12	22	1	0	21	1403	1974	24

=== Other departments ===
Athletics department participated regional competitions from 1940 to 1952. The department had its best ever season 1953–1954 with titles won by the athletes Yıldıray Pagda, Atilla Pinoz, Yavuz Pagda and Turgay Renklikurt, all becoming well known nationally. The club had several team titles and individual titles within the next decade. After an idling period that lasted until 1980, with the re-organizing efforts of Regional Athletics Coach, Hasan Tekin, the club won titles in the next five years. Cycling agent and coach Ahmet Ecesoy trained cyclists Ertugrul Arlı, Ahmet Avcılar, İbrahım Gönül and Erol Berk, all becoming part of the National Cycling Team of Turkey. Cycling department were dissolved in 1983. Volleyball department were the champions for 5 years in a row, from 1967 to 1972 at the Regional Volleyball League. They were dissolved soon after. Club directors Şevket Kapulu ve Fevzi Özşahin founded the Wrestling Department in 1956 by converting part of the clubhouse to a wrestling training center, and making up a team from field wrestlers. Wrestlers of Adana Demirspor competed for the Turkish National Wrestling Team in several events. The Wrestling department of ADS became less active after 1968 and were dissolved within the next decade.

== Honours ==
- Turkish Football League System
  - First Tier (Super Lig)
    - Europa Conference League Qualification: 2022-23
  - Second Tier (1.Lig)
    - Winners (4): 1972–73, 1986–87, 1990–91, 2020–21
    - Playoff winners (1): 1993–94
  - Third Tier (2.Lig)
    - Winners (1): 2001–02,
    - Playoff winners (1): 2011–12
  - Turkish Cup
    - Runners-up (1): 1977–78
  - Prime Minister's Cup
    - Runners-up (1): 1978
- Adana Football
  - National Finals
    - Winners (1) : 1954
    - Third (2) : 1947, 1951
  - Adana League
    - Winners (16) (record): 1942–43, 1943–44, 1944–45, 1945–46, 1946–47, 1947–48, 1948–49, 1949–50, 1950–51, 1951–52, 1952–53, 1953–54, 1954–55, 1956–57, 1957–58, 1958–59
- Turkish Waterpolo League
  - Sutopu 1.Lig
    - Winners (21): 1942, 1943, 1944, 1945, 1946, 1947, 1948, 1949, 1950, 1951, 1952, 1953, 1954, 1956, 1958, 1959, 1960, 1962, 1963, 1964, 1965
- Turkish Basketball League
  - Second Tier (TBL)
    - Winners (2): 1972–73, 1974–75

== Governance ==
Adana Demirspor is an incorporated company. Murat Sancak holds the majority of the shares. The club were a member-owned sports club until 2021. From 1940 to 1959, the club were directly governed by TCDD.

As of 21 September 2021

Position	Name
President	Bedirhan Durak
Vice-president	Remzi Kar
Director for TFF Relations	Levent Özveren
Director for Legal Matters	Tekin Taylancı
Director for Public Relations	Savaş Çokduygulu
Director for Amateur Branches	İsmail Tanrıverdi
Director for Facilities and Supporters	Levent Aris
Director for International Relations	Ekrem İnaltekin
Director for Advertisements and Sponsorship	Telat Şahin
Director for Advertisements and Sponsorship	Süleyman Bilici
Director for Advertisements and Sponsorship	Fatih Tosmur
Director for Advertisements and Sponsorship	Tarkan Kulak
Director for Advertisements and Sponsorship	Casim Korkmaz
Director for Advertisements and Sponsorship	Cihan Şanlı
Director for Advertisements and Sponsorship	Tarık Özunal

== Notable players ==
Muharrem Gülergin (nickname is Fofo) is the most well-known and reputable name of the club, who performed in different branches such as football, athleticism, water polo, as well as being a manager and coach in later years. The north curva tribune in the old stadium (5 Ocak) was named after him. In addition, the names that became the notable players by performed for a long time in the early era of the club can be shown as Selami Tekkazancı (nicknamed Füze), Yaşar Kartal (nicknamed Kartal), Ali Hikmet Aydınlıoğlu (nicknamed Coral). In the 1970s especially, Rasin Gürcan was one of the key players who symbolized with Demirspor. He was the captain of 1977–78 season that Demirspor was runner-up in the Turkish Cup.

Fatih Terim and Hasan Şaş, two names synonymous with Galatasaray and the Turkish national team, were born in Adana and began their careers with Adana Demirspor. Terim spent five years (1969-1974) at the club before moving to Galatasaray. He became a manager after retiring and won several honours, including the UEFA Cup in 2000, four straight Süper Lig titles, and a semi-final finish in the 2008 UEFA European Football Championship. Şaş spent two years at the club before moving to Ankaragücü in 1995. He was a part of the Turkey squad that finished in third place at the 2002 FIFA World Cup. He also played a part in winning five Süper Lig and three Turkish Cup titles with Galatasaray from 1998 to 2009. Adana Demirspor also produced striker Taner Gülleri.
