= Bekir Çınar =

Turkish businessperson (b. 1969, d. 2010)

President of Adana Demirspor
- In office January 2009 – 16 August 2010
- Preceded by: Mehmet Gökoğlu
- Succeeded by: Mustafa Tuncel

Personal details
- Born: 2 June 1969 Yozgat, Turkey
- Died: 16 August 2010 (aged 41) Seyhan, Adana, Turkey
- Party: Nationalist Movement Party
- Profession: Businessman

Bekir Çınar (2 June 1969 – 16 August 2010) was a Turkish businessman. He became the president of Adana Demirspor in 2009 and served in this position for 1 year.

During his presidency, Çınar made a big impression after organizing a friendly match against Livorno, a Serie A team at the time. He established very warm and close relations with the club's fans, took all the debts of the club on himself and prevented the club from being completely expelled from the leagues. Due to the debts he took on himself, he committed suicide on August 16, 2010, by hanging himself with a blue navy blue rope on the fire escape of the apartment building where he lived.

It was claimed that Çınar spent approximately 4 million TL out of his own pocket in the 2 years he was in charge of Adana Demirspor, of which he was able to get 1 million TL back, and that he had a lien on the remaining 3 million TL. It was also claimed that Çınar, who had a hard time due to the money he spent on Adana Demirspor and his inability to receive his progress payments, took money from loan sharks in return for interest as a last resort to get rid of his troubles.

Çınar's coffin was covered with Turkish and Adana Demirspor flags.

== Personal life ==
Çınar was married and was the father of three children.
