= Orange Blossom Carnival =

Annual celebration in Adana, Turkey

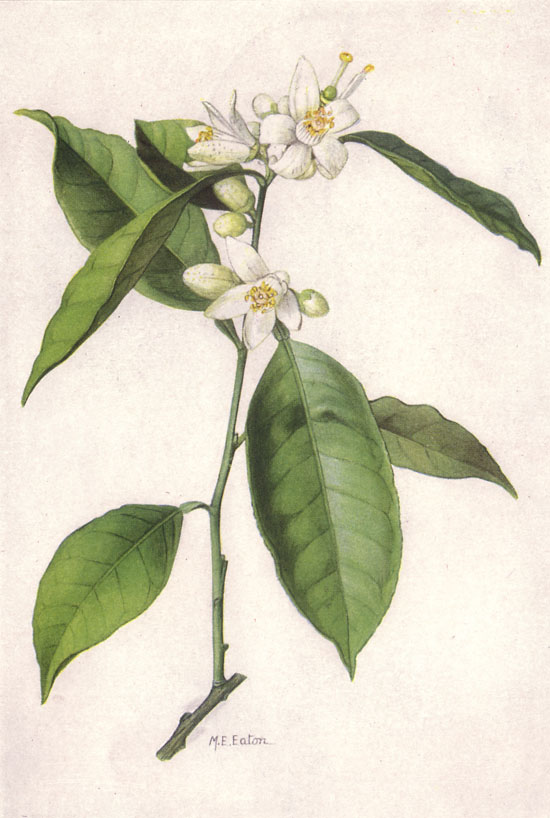
- Observed by: Adana, Turkey
- Type: Local
- Celebrations: Carnival parade, concerts, shows, dances
- Frequency: annual
- Related to: Orange blossom season

The Orange Blossom Carnival is an annual celebration held every April in Adana, Turkey. It is an inspiration to the blossom scent that covers the orange tree lined streets during early April. While some of the carnival celebrations occur at organized, large-scale events, others are simply spontaneous street celebrations.

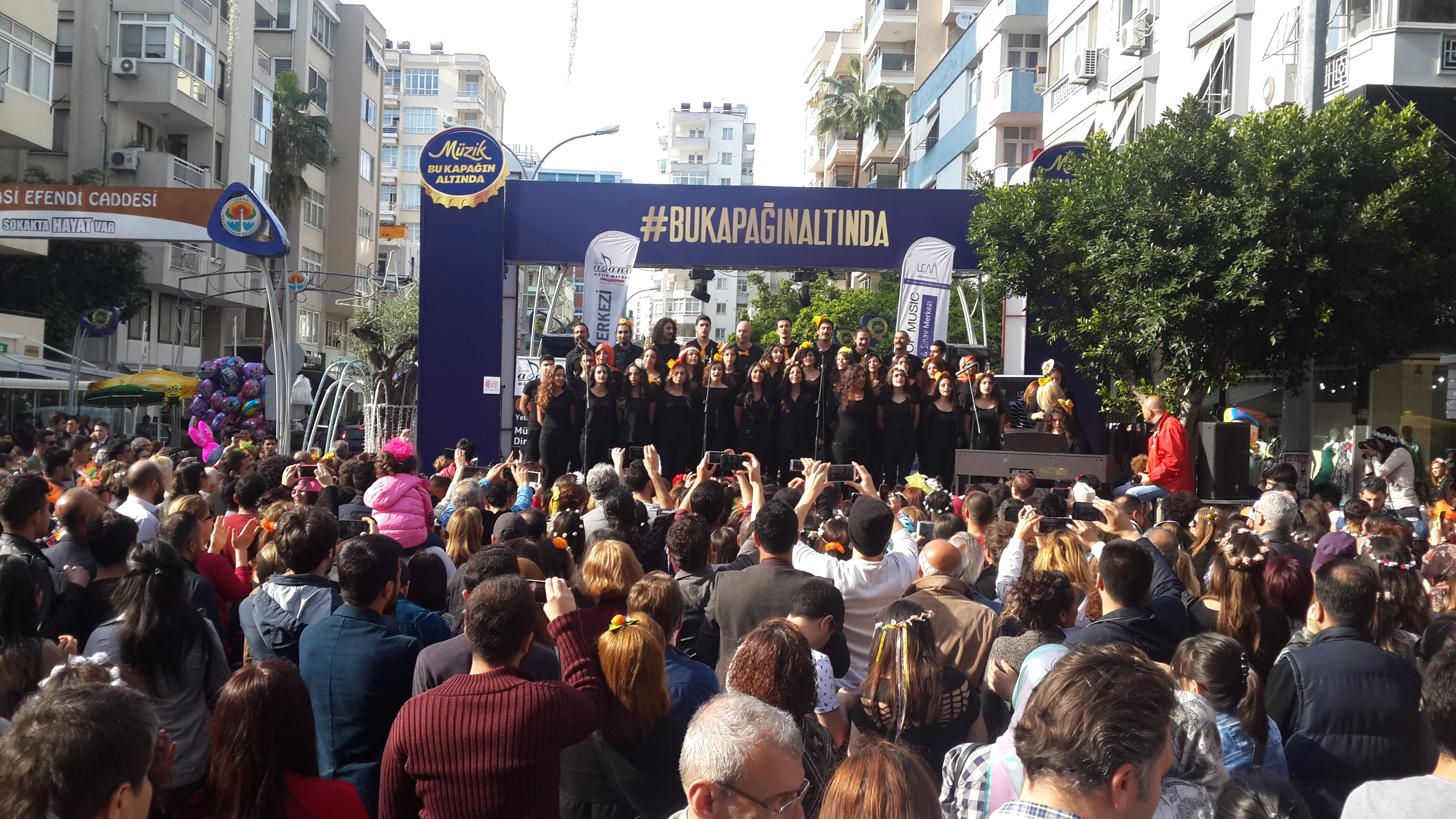
A concert in 2015

The carnival begins in early April and has the simple slogan "Nisan'da Adana'da" (In April In Adana). It is one of the first annual carnivals in Turkey. The Orange Blossom Carnival of Adana is accompanied by many concerts, shows and processions notable for vibrant colors.

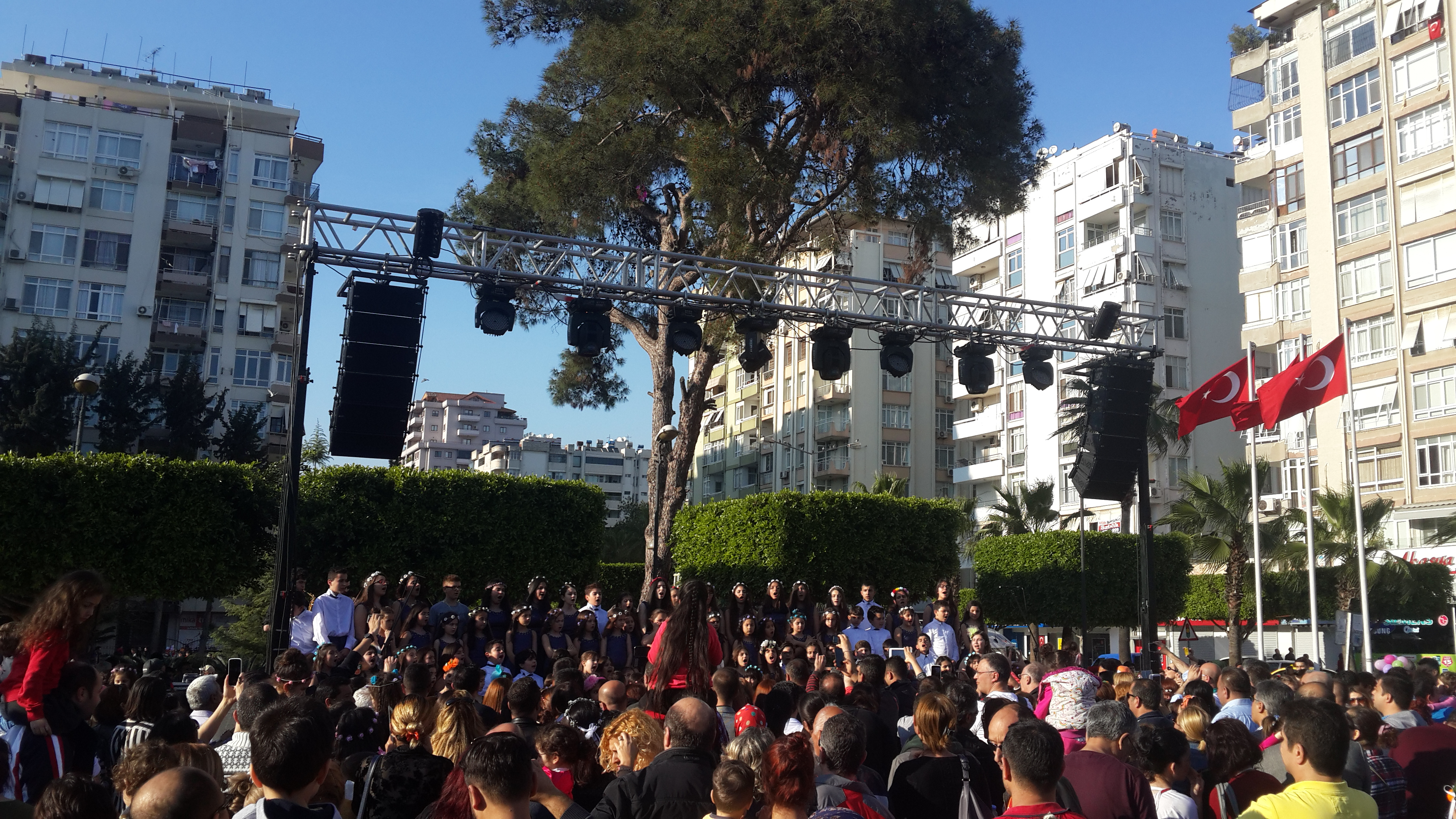
Youth Choir at the Atatürk Park.

- The inaugural carnival took place April 12–14, 2013. Fifteen thousand people joined in the processions.
- The second event took place April 11–14, 2014.
- The carnival in 2015 took place on April 4–6. The carnival parade attracted more than 90 thousand people, highest attendance ever in an outdoor event in Adana.
