= Adanaspor =

Turkish football club

Coordinates: 37°01′57″N 35°15′45″E

- Full name: Adanaspor Spor Faaliyetleri A.Ş.
- Nicknames: Turuncu (The Orange); Toros Kaplanları ([The] Taurus Tigers)
- Founded: 1954; 72 years ago
- Ground: Adana Stadium
- Capacity: 30,960
- Chairman: Ergin Göleli
- Head coach: Hakan Keleş
- League: TFF 3. Lig
- 2025–26: TFF 2. Lig, Red, 17th of 18 (relegated)
- Website: www.adanaspor.com.tr
Home colours	Away colours	Third colours

Adanaspor Kulübü is a Turkish professional football club based in Adana; currently, they play in the TFF 2. Lig.

The club was founded in 1954 by middle-class merchants and artisans in response to their perceived alienation within the city's then most popular club, Adana Demirspor, who were supported by workers, financed by landowners, and governed by TCDD staff. The two clubs first played against each other in 1956, with the match becoming known as the Adana derby. Both clubs have fiercely competed for citywide support and domination since then, and each club's fans believe their club to be the true representation of the city of Adana. In addition, Adanaspor's home ground, Adana Stadium, is shared with their archrivals, which intesifies their matches even further. Adanaspor's jersey colors, orange and white, symbolize oranges and cotton, the main harvests of the city.

Adanaspor were one of the most successful clubs of the Turkish Football League in the 1970s and early 1980s. Toros Kaplanları (Taurus Tigers) were the Runners-up for the 1980-81 season, having participated at the top division for a total of 22 years. The club also competed in the UEFA Cup for three years.

== History ==
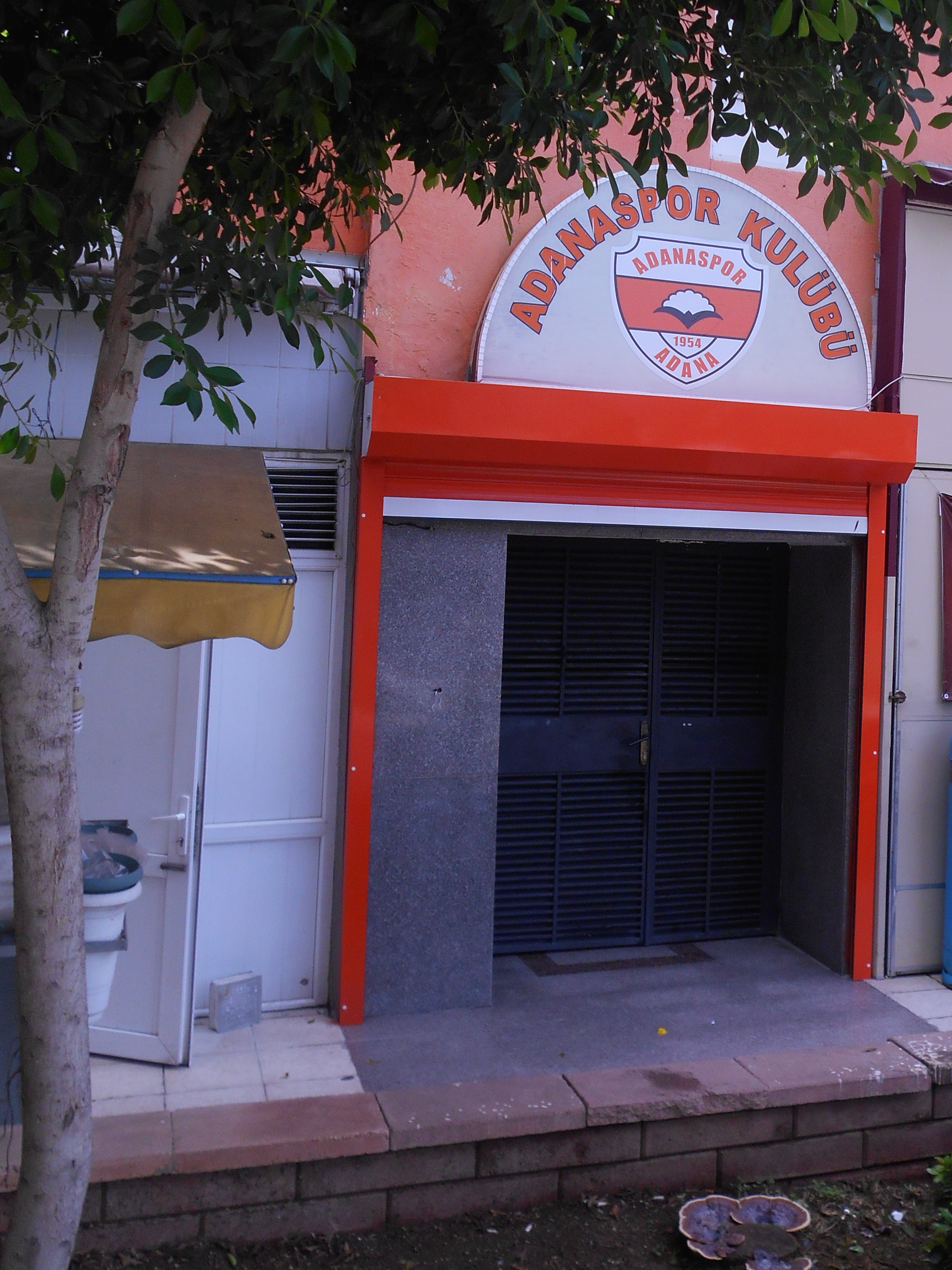
Club entrance

A club under the name of Adanaspor was first founded in 1932; it competed in the Adana Amateur League. Orhan Kemal (the pen name of internationally known novelist Mehmet Raşit Öğütçü) played for this iteration of the club.

Club badge 1954–67

However, the club that would become Adanaspor was founded on January 23, 1954, by Mehmet Şanlıtürk, Mustafa Bekbaş, Erol Erk, Ali Gedikbaş and Dr. Muzaffer Eraslan. The club's original colours were yellow and navy, and it competed in the amateur league until 1966, when Adanaspor merged with Akinspor and Torosspor in order to become a fully professional club. The "new" club was admitted into the 2. Lig (the Second Division of Turkish football) in its first season as a professional club. After the merge, the club colours were changed to orange and white.

Adanaspor competed in the 2. Lig until they earned promotion to the 1. Lig (Süper Lig) at the conclusion of the 1970–71 season. They spent thirteen consecutive seasons in the 1. Lig (1971 to 1984), competing in the UEFA Cup three times, and at the Balkans Cup once. Adanaspor won its first cup, the Gençlik ve Spor Bakanlığı Kupası, in 1973. They defeated İzmir Denizgücü SK 2–0 in the final, with Behçet Arkun and Orhan Yalçınkaya scoring the goals.

At the end of the 1975–76 season, Adanaspor finished fourth, their highest finish in the top-flight at the time. Not long after, they went on to better their record, finishing second in 1980–81. Despite the apparent success and upward progression, Adanaspor's fortunes took a turn for the worse, and they were relegated for the first time in 1984. They earned promotion in 1988 after winning the 2. Lig, but due to financial troubles, the club could not keep up their level of performance, and were relegated back to the 2. Lig at the end of the 1990–91 season.

The club spent the next several years bouncing between leagues, spiraling downward in the mid-2000s, and culminated in a declaration of bankruptcy in 2005. By 2006, Adanaspor were relegated three consecutive seasons, ending in the 3. Lig (Fourth Division).

However, after hitting "rock bottom," their fortunes changed. Adanaspor earned consecutive promotions (2006–07 and 2007–08), and became regulars in the 1. Lig (Second Division) for the next decade. They narrowly missed promotion to the Süper Lig at the end of the 2009–10 season. In 2011–12, they were again provided a chance to return to the top level of Turkish football, after qualifying to the Promotion Play-offs with a 6th-place finish. They defeated Çaykur Rizespor 4–1 on aggregate in the two-legged semifinal, but lost 3–2 to Kasımpaşa a.e.t. in the Play-off Final. Finally, on 24 April 2016, after 12 years in the lower leagues, Adanaspor guaranteed their place in the Süper Lig for the 2016-17 season after coming back from 0–2 deficit to defeat Gaziantep BB 3–2 away from home. After one season in the Süper Lig, they were relegated to the First League, where they would compete in 2022/23, where they would withdraw from the league due to an earthquake in the area. However, they were kept in the league. In the following season, they survived by only one point, but they were relegated in 2024/25. Going into the TFF 2.Lig, Adanaspor was still suffering from the earthquake and from a transfer ban they received, and thus only being able to use academy players. Because of this, Adanaspor had one of the worst performances of the Turkish 3rd division, ending up only scoring 1 point and 17 goals, with only 8 goals being on field. they only drew 1 game against Somaspor, as well as 3 w.o wins against Yeni Malatyaspor and Yeni Mersin Idmanyurdu. However, they only finished on 1 point due to the loss of 9 points by FIFA, and they suffered 159 goals in 31 played games. Because of this, for the 2026/27 season, Adanaspor will have to face being "Rock Bottom" like 20 years before, and will have to hope for them to come back to the first division like they did before.

== Stadium and facilities ==
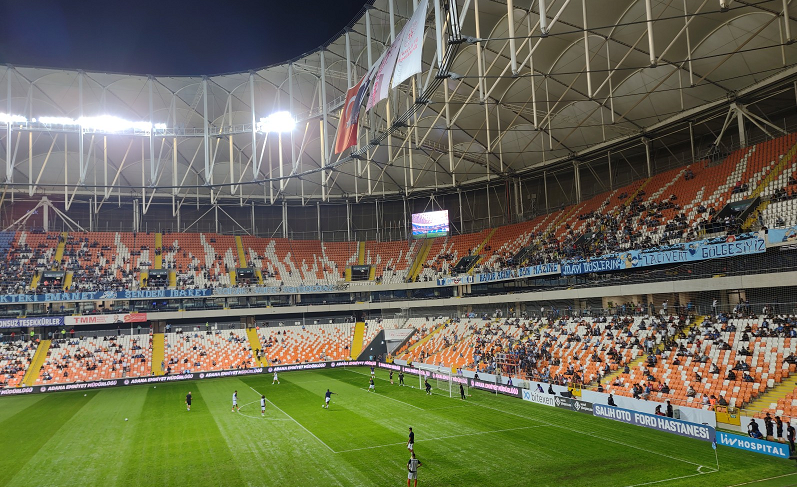
The New Adana Stadium

Adanaspor play their home matches at the New Adana Stadium in Sarıçam district since February 2021. South side of the stadium are designated for Adanaspor fans and are painted in orange and white. The stadium has a seating capacity of 33,543 and it is shared with Adana Demirspor. The club previously played their home games at the 5 Ocak Stadium from 1954 to 2021.

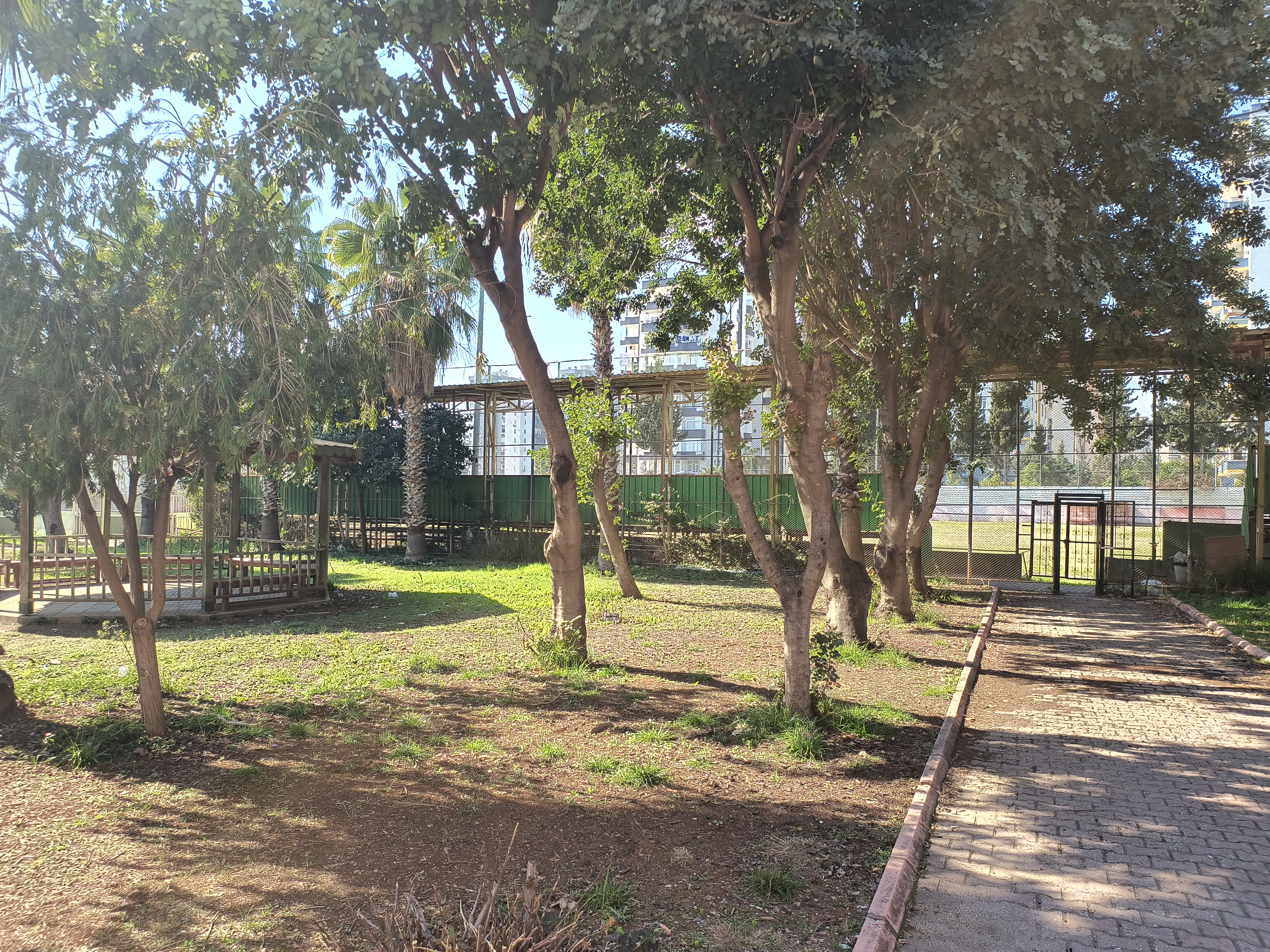
Osman Yereşen Youth Facility

Professional football team training ground is the Çatalan Tesisleri, 25 km north of the city, in the Karaisalı district. The facility has 4 pitches, swimming pool, fitness center and staff-player residences. The main facility for the youth teams is the Osman Yereşen Facility in the Çukurova district. The facility has two pitches and a residence building. Some age groups of the youth team train at the Gündüz Tekin Onay training facility, which is also in Çukurova district.

== Supporters and rivalries ==
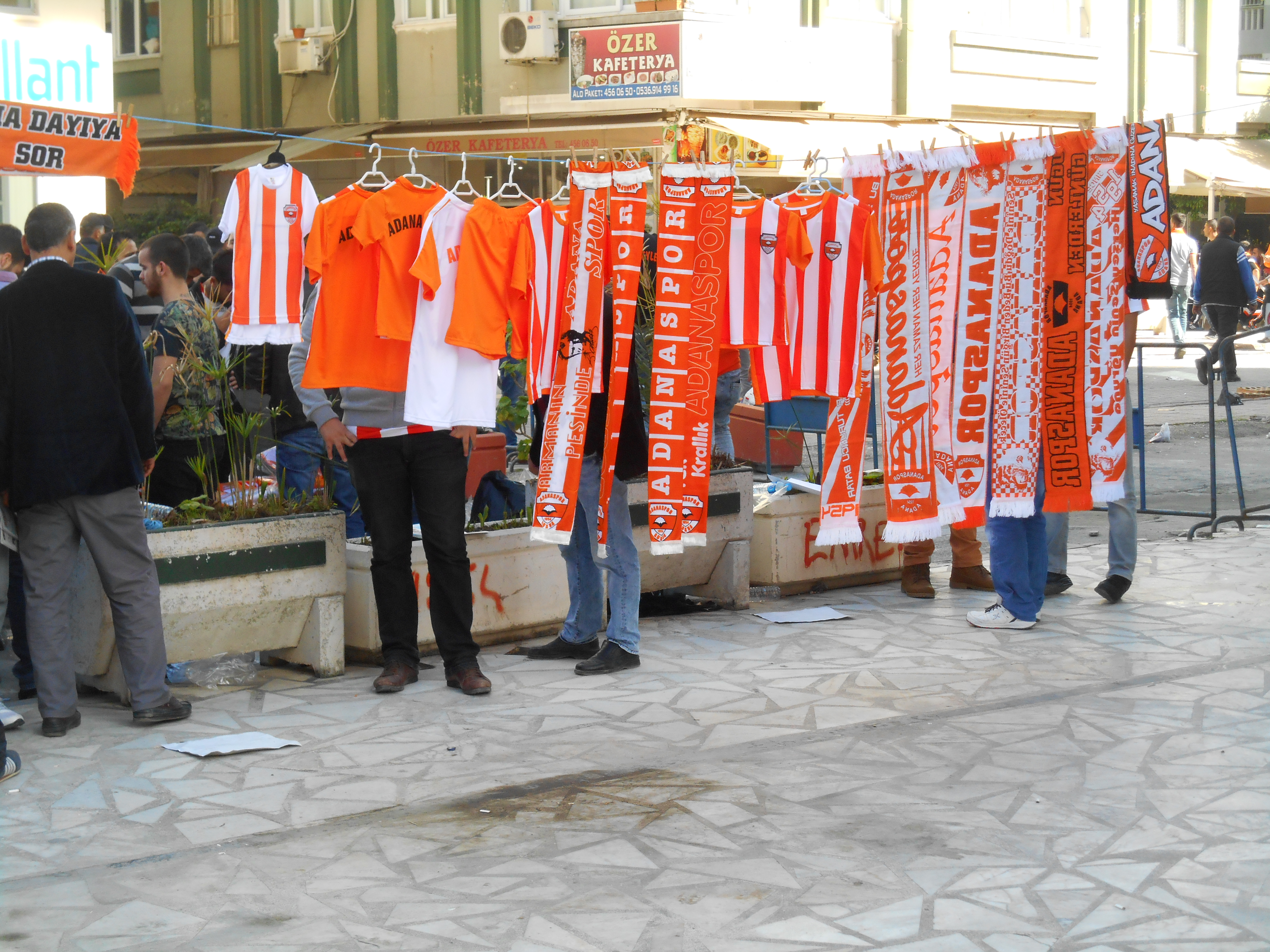
Adanaspor products sold before a match

Adanaspor are traditionally supported by the merchants and artisans of the city. Until the change in the club management in the early 2000s, Adanaspor had a loyal fan base and had spectator average of 10,000 to 15,000 at every game. Since the club converted into a one-owner private company, although they continued to be supported at a good season, level of loyalty diminished sharply. During the seasons in which Adanaspor had poor results, average number of spectators fell down to 1,500, way below the averages of the years from 1970 to 2000.

Adanaspor's main supporters group is "Turbeyler". Their permanent location at the 5 Ocak Stadium is the GKA (South Stands) which they call it the 'Arjantin Köşe' (en:Argentine Corner). Before the 2000s at the derby matches, the West and the large East stand were shared equally by Adana Demir and Adanaspor fans, Adana Demir fans settle at the north seats of these Stands and Adanaspor fans settle at the south section. Since the 2000s, the entire West and East Stands were open only to the fans of the official host of the derby match. When Adana Demirspor is hosting, Adanaspor fans are only allowed to the 1,600-seat South Stand and when Adanaspor is hosting, Adana Demirspor fans are only allowed to the 1,600-seat North Stand.

== Honours ==
- Süper Lig
  - Runners-up (1): 1980–81
  - Third Place (1): 1975–76
- 1. Lig
  - Winners (3):1970–71, 1987–88, 2015–16
- 2. Lig
  - Runners-up (1): 2007–08
- 3. Lig
  - Winners (1): 2006–07

== Competitions ==
- Adana League: 12 years/ 1954–66
- Turkish Football League: 59 years/ 1966-
  - First Tier (Süper Lig): 22 years/ 1971–84, 1988–91, 1998–01, 2002–04, 2016–2017
  - Second Tier (1. Lig): 34 years/ 1966–71, 1984–88, 1991–98, 2001–02, 2004–05, 2008–16, 2017-2025,
  - Third Tier (2. Lig): 2 years/ 2005–06, 2007–08, 2025–
  - Fourth Tier (3. Lig): 1 year/ 2006–07

== European participations ==
As of 30 September 1981

Competition	P	W	D	L	GF	GA	GD
UEFA Cup	6	1	1	4	6	20	–14
Balkans Cup	4	0	2	2	3	11	–8
Total	10	1	3	6	9	31	–22

P = Matches played; W = Matches won; D = Matches drawn; L = Matches lost; GF = Goals for; GA = Goals against; GD = Goals difference.

UEFA Cup:

Season	Round	Club	Home	Away	Aggregate
1976–77	First Round	(Austria) Salzburg	2–0	0–5	2–5
1978–79	First Round	(Hungary) Budapest Honvéd	2–2	0–6	2–8
1981–82	First Round	(Italy) Inter Milan	1–3	1–4	2–7

Balkans Cup:

Season	Round	Club	Home	Away	Aggregate
1976	Group Stage (Group A)	(Romania) Sportul Studențesc	2–2	0–7	3rd
1976	Group Stage (Group A)	(Bulgaria) Akademik Sofia	1–1	0–1	3rd

UEFA ranking history:

As of 1983

Season	Rank	Points	Ref.
1977	152 ▲	1.000	
1978	157 ▼	1.000	
1979	116 ▲	1.500	
1980	123 ▼	1.500	
1981	124 ▼	1.500	
1982	202 ▼	0.500	
1983	204 ▼	0.500	

== Players ==
=== Current squad ===
As of 8 December 2025

Note: Flags indicate national team as defined under FIFA eligibility rules; some limited exceptions apply. Players may hold more than one non-FIFA nationality.

No.	Pos.	Nation	Player
5	MF	TUR	Emir Can Aksu
9	FW	TUR	Burhan Tuzun
13	MF	TUR	Çağan Gediktaş
19	MF	TUR	Hasan Dağlı
21	DF	TUR	Tuğra Gül
22	FW	TUR	Bünyamin Oklu
23	FW	TUR	Cebeli Baturhan Ünal
31	GK	TUR	Koray Anlar
45	FW	TUR	Bartu Büyüköztürk
60	MF	TUR	Görkem Gökçe
62	DF	TUR	Ulaş Uzun
63	DF	TUR	Ömer Faruk Gökalp
66	DF	TUR	Arda Bulca
70	GK	TUR	Talha Eğribayat
71	GK	TUR	Saffet Vehbi Urhan

No.	Pos.	Nation	Player
72	FW	TUR	İsmail Solmaz
74	MF	TUR	Serdar Yakıcı
77	MF	TUR	Türker Kaplan
80	GK	TUR	Ali Ateş
81	FW	TUR	Mehmet Taşçı
82	FW	TUR	Kürşad Duran Şaş
83	FW	TUR	Mücahit Beliren
84	DF	TUR	Emir Işık
85	DF	TUR	Muhammed Tap
88	DF	TUR	Mirac Akay
90	DF	TUR	Semih İsmail Bakır
91	DF	TUR	Mesut İncekara
92	DF	TUR	Mustafa Talha Öz
94	DF	TUR	Samet Emlik
95	MF	TUR	Devrim Deniz Özcan

== Affiliated clubs ==
The following club(s) are currently affiliated with Adanaspor:

- (Turkey) Beşiktaş J.K. (2015–present)
