= 1969–70 Mersin İdmanyurdu season =

Mersin İdmanyurdu
1969–70 season
- President: Mehmet Karamehmet
- Coach: (Turkey) Bülent Giz
- Stadium: Mersin, Turkey
- First League: 4th
- Turkish Cup: Eliminated at R2
- Top goalscorer: (Turkey) Osman Arpacıoğlu (6)
Home colours	Away colours	Third colours

Mersin İdmanyurdu (also Mersin İdman Yurdu, Mersin İY, or MİY) Sports Club; located in Mersin, east Mediterranean coast of Turkey in 1969–70. The 1969–70 season was the third season of Mersin İdmanyurdu (MİY) football team in Turkish First Football League, the first level division in Turkey. They finished fourth which was the best position the team ever obtained.

The team manager was Bülent Giz, one of the famous managers in 1970's Turkish football; and the club president was Mehmet Karamahmet, Çukurova Group's owner. Deputy president was Mahir Turan. Erol Tarhan was general captain. Sadri Usluoğlu who worked as executive for Beşiktaş and national team became general manager of İdmanyurdu. Before the start of the season Kadri Aytaç was the technical advisor and look for foreign transfers. Later he attended in a course in Romania.

Mersin İdmanyurdu has targeted championship in this season. Coach Bülent Giz has written an article to declare their target in the mid-season. He said that if the substitutes had been good enough they hadn'nt been finished first half at third place. His claim remained until the end of the league when the team lost last two matches to average teams and lost the chance to be eligible for European Cups next year.

== Pre-season ==
MİY opened the season on 25.07.1969 in Tarsus. Tevfik Sırrı Gür Stadium was under repairement.

- 03.08.1969 – Spor-Toto Cup – MİY-Samsunspor: 1–1. Sunday, 17:00. Mersin. Goals: Temel 62' (Samsun), Osman 74' (MİY).
- 10.08.1969 – Spor-Toto Cup – Gençlerbirliği-MİY: 1–1. Sunday, 21:45. 19 Mayıs Stadium, Ankara. Goals: İlhan 7', Turan 37'(o.g.)
- 20.08.1969 – Preparation game – Galatasaray-MİY: 0–0. Wednesday, 20:00. Mithatpaşa Stadium, İstanbul. Referees: Hüseyin Maloğlu, Özcan Gürkaynak, Güngör Tunçel. Galatasaray: Nihat, Ekrem, Ali, Muzaffer, Talat, Turan, Mehmet, Feridun (Olcay), Ayhan, Ergün (Bilgin), Uğur. Coach: Kaloperoviç. MİY: Fikret, Halim (B.İbrahim), Alp, Mustafa (Arif), Erol, Cihat, Ali (K.Erol), Tarık (K.İbrahim), Osman, Muharrem.
- 24.08.1969 – Preparation game – Bursaspor-MİY: 5–1. Monday, 16:45. Bursa. Referees: Abdi Parlakay, Mehmet Rodoslu, Basri Akkoyunlu. Bursaspor: Osman (Yıldız), Vahit, Haluk (İrfan), İsmail (Müfit), İbrahim, Cengiz (Sırrı), Necati, Ersel (Canan), Mesut (Cemal), Taner (Sinan), Ender. Goals: Ersel 4', Ender 27', Ersel 38, Ender 43', Necati 61'(H). MİY: Fikret (Muradis), Erol, Alp, Mustafa, Nihat, Arif, Ali, Ayhan, Tarık, Osman, Muharrem. Goal: Osman (P).
- Boluspor-MİY: 3–1.
- 17.09.1969 – In the first preparation match in their home ground MİY defeated Tarsus İdmanyurdu: 6–0. Goals: Ayhan (3), Muharrem (2) and Arif. In another preparation game Bursaspor defeated MİY 5–1. The first match of the league was also played against Bursa but MİY this time beat them at away game.

== 1969–70 First League participation ==
First League was played with 16 teams in its twelfth season, 1969–70. Last two teams relegated to Second League 1970–71. Mersin İY became fourth with 12 wins, and Osman Arpacıoğlu was most scorer player with 6 goals. Mersin İdmanyurdu has fought for second place -which provided eligibility for Fairs Cup- with Eskişehirspor, Altay, and Göztepe; and missed the chance of participation in a European cup.

=== Results summary ===
Mersin İdmanyurdu (MİY) 1969–70 First League summary:

	Overall									Home								Away							
Stage	Pc	Pl	W	D	L	GF	GA	GD	Pt	Pl	W	D	L	GF	GA	GD	Pt	Pl	W	D	L	GF	GA	GD	Pt
First half	3	15	8	5	2	19	10	+9	21	8	6	2	0	11	3	+8	14	7	2	3	2	8	7	+1	7
Second half		15	4	7	4	13	17	−4	15	7	4	3	0	7	2	+5	11	8	0	4	4	6	15	−9	4
Overall	4	30	12	12	6	32	27	+5	36	15	10	5	0	18	5	+13	25	15	2	7	6	14	22	−8	11

Sources: 1969–70 Turkish First Football League pages.

=== League table ===
Mersin İY's league performance in First League in 1969–70 season is shown in the following table.

Pos	Team	Pld	W	D	L	GF	GA	GD	Pts	Qualification or relegation
2	Eskişehirspor	30	14	9	7	46	26	+20	37	Invitation to Inter-Cities Fairs Cup first round
3	Altay	30	13	10	7	27	17	+10	36	Invitation to Balkans Cup
4	Mersin İdman Yurdu	30	12	12	6	32	27	+5	36	
5	Göztepe A.Ş.	30	12	11	7	33	29	+4	35	Qualification to Cup Winners' Cup first round
6	Samsunspor	30	11	9	10	24	28	−4	31	

Rules for classification: 1) points; 2) goal difference; 3) number of goals scored.

Note: Won, drawn and lost points are 2, 1 and 0. F belongs to MİY and A belongs to corresponding team for both home and away matches.

=== Results by round ===
Results of games MİY played in 1969–70 First League by rounds:

Round	1	2	3	4	5	6	7	8	9	10	11	12	13	14	15	16	17	18	19	20	21	22	23	24	25	26	27	28	29	30
Ground	A	H	H	A	H	A	H	A	A	H	A	H	A	H	H	H	A	A	H	A	H	A	H	H	A	H	A	H	A	A
Result	W	D	W	L	W	D	W	L	W	D	D	W	D	W	W	W	L	D	W	L	D	D	D	W	D	W	D	D	L	L
Position	3	2	3	5	3	4	3	5	3	4	3	3	3	3	3	3	3	3	3	3	3	3	3	3	3	2	2	2	3	4

Source: 1969–70 Turkish First Football League pages.
A = Away; H = Home; W = Win; D = Draw; L = Loss

=== First half ===
21 September 1969 Round 1	Bursaspor	0–2	Mersin İdmanyurdu	Atatürk Stadium, Balıkesir
Sunday, 16:00		Report	3' Ayhan Öz; 46' Muharrem Algıç	Referee: Sedat Özselçuk

28 September 1969 Round 2	Mersin İdmanyurdu	0–0	Samsunspor	Tevfik Sırrı Gür Stadium, Mersin
Sunday, 16:00		Report		Referee: Ahmet Bagatır

5 October 1969 Round 3	Mersin İdmanyurdu	1–0	Eskişehirspor	Tevfik Sırrı Gür Stadium, Mersin
Sunday, 15:00	Tarık Kutver 67'	Report		Referee: Ertuğrul Dilek

19 October 1969 Round 4	Galatasaray	2–1	Mersin İdmanyurdu	Mithatpaşa Stadium, Istanbul
Sunday, 15:15	Mehmet Oğuz 61'	Report	22' (o.g.) Refik Çoğum; 28' Tarık Kutver	Referee: Cezmi Başar

26 October 1969 Round 5	Mersin İdmanyurdu	3–1	Vefa	Tevfik Sırrı Gür Stadium, Mersin
Sunday, 15:00	Octavian Popescu 30'; İbrahim Arayıcı 67'; İbrahim Arayıcı 70'	Report	43' (F) Erdal Özvardar	Referee: Macit Sarıdana

1 November 1969 Round 6	Fenerbahçe	1–1	Mersin İdmanyurdu	Mithatpaşa Stadium, Istanbul
Saturday 14:45	Ogün Altıparmak 30'	Report	41' Octavian Popescu	Referee: Veli Necdet Arığ

9 November 1969 Round 7	Mersin İdmanyurdu	1–0	Altınordu	Tevfik Sırrı Gür Stadium, Mersin
Sunday, 14:30	Ali Açıkgöz 22'	Report		Referee: Mazhar Kerestecioğlu

23 November 1969 Round 8	Altay	1–0	Mersin İdmanyurdu	Alsancak Stadium, İzmir
Sunday, 15:00	Ayfer Elmastaşoğlu 74' (F)	Report		Referee: Hüseyin Maloğlu

30 November 1969 Round 9	Gençlerbirliği	1–2	Mersin İdmanyurdu	19 Mayıs Stadium, Ankara
Sunday, 14:00	Burhan Tözer (penalty missed) 53'; Tevfik Kutlay 69'	Report	25' Osman Arpacıoğlu; 68' Ali Açıkgöz	Referee: Muzaffer Sarvan

7 December 1969 Round 10	Mersin İdmanyurdu	2–2	Göztepe	Tevfik Sırrı Gür Stadium, Mersin
Sunday, 14:00	Tarık Kutver 58'; Mustafa Yürür 62' (pen.)	Report	28' Fevzi Zemzem; 31' Fevzi Zemzem	Referee: Nihat Özbirgül

13 December 1969 Round 11	Ankara Demirspor	2–2	Mersin İdmanyurdu	19 Mayıs Stadium, Ankara
Saturday, 14:00	Cahit Eruz 8'; Tuncer Özbilgin 58'	Report	54' Osman Arpacıoğlu; 56' Muharrem Algıç	Referee: Yavuz Tunç

21 December 1969 Round 12	Mersin İdmanyurdu	2–0	PTT	Tevfik Sırrı Gür Stadium, Mersin
Sunday, 13:45	Ayhan Öz 85'; Tarık Kutver 87'	Report		Referee: Nazif Oturgan

28 December 1969 Round 13	Beşiktaş	0–0	Mersin İdmanyurdu	Mithatpaşa Stadium, Istanbul
Sunday, 14:15		Report		Referee: Sabahattin Ladikli

4 January 1970 Round 14	Mersin İdmanyurdu	1–0	İstanbulspor	Tevfik Sırrı Gür Stadium, Mersin
Sunday, 14:00	Osman Arpacıoğlu 11'	Report		Referee: Ziya Türkdoğan

11 January 1970 Round 15	Mersin İdmanyurdu	1–0	Ankaragücü	Tevfik Sırrı Gür Stadium, Mersin
Sunday, 14:00	Mustafa Yürür 82' (pen.)	Report		Referee: Müşfik Talas

=== Mid-season ===
Friendly game during half season:

- 08.02.1970 – MİY-Fenerbahçe: 2–2. Sunday, 14:15. Tevfik Sırrı Gür Stadium, Mersin. Referees: Mustafa Oğultürk, Mehmet Çetinel, İhsan Büyükgiray. MİY: Javorek, K.İbrahim, Cihat, Mustafa, B.Erol, Arif, Ali, Tarık, Osman, Popescu, Muharrem. Goals: Tarık 37', Osman 85'. Fenerbahçe: Datcu, Şükrü, Ümran, Nunweiller, Ercan, Levent, Can, Ziya, Abdullah, Nedim, Ogün. Goals: Can 57'(P), Ziya 72'.

=== Second half ===
22 February 1970 Round 16	Mersin İdmanyurdu	2–1	Bursaspor	Tevfik Sırrı Gür Stadium, Mersin
Sunday, 14:30	Muharrem Algıç 2'; Osman Arpacıoğlu 25'	Report	3' Vahit Kolukısa	Referee: Nevzat Tansuk

1 March 1970 Round 17	Samsunspor	1–0	Mersin İdmanyurdu	City Stadium, Samsun
Sunday, 14:30	Temel Keskindemir 3' (pen.)	Report		Referee: Ziya Türkdoğan

8 March 1970 Round 18	Eskişehirspor	1–1	Mersin İdmanyurdu	Atatürk Stadium, Eskişehir
Sunday, 15:00	Fethi Heper 84'	Report	32' Osman Arpacıoğlu	Referee: Zeki Gürkan

27 May 1970 Round 19	Mersin İdmanyurdu	1–0	Galatasaray	Tevfik Sırrı Gür Stadium, Mersin
Wednesday, 15:30	İbrahim Arayıcı 51'	Report		Referee: Cezmi Başar

21 March 1970 Round 20	Vefa	2–0	Mersin İdmanyurdu	Mithatpaşa Stadium, Istanbul
Saturday, 15:00	Bekir Psav 44' (pen.); Erdinç Sandalcı 46' (H)	Report	(red card) 43' Osman Arpacıoğlu	Referee: Ertuğrul Dilek

29 March 1970 Round 21	Mersin İdmanyurdu	0–0	Fenerbahçe	Tevfik Sırrı Gür Stadium, Mersin
Sunday, 15:00		Report		Referee: (Germany) Paul Kindervater

5 April 1970 Round 22	Altınordu	2–2	Mersin İdmanyurdu	Alsancak Stadium, İzmir
Sunday, 15:30	Bahri Altıntabak 67'; Mehmet Engerek 73'	Report	5' Muharrem Algıç; 6' İbrahim Arayıcı	Referee: (Germany) Helmut Fritz

12 April 1970 Round 23	Mersin İdmanyurdu	0–0	Altay	Tevfik Sırrı Gür Stadium, Mersin
Sunday, 14:30		Report		Referee: Doğan Babacan

19 April 1970 Round 24	Mersin İdmanyurdu	1–0	Gençlerbirliği	Tevfik Sırrı Gür Stadium, Mersin
Sunday, 14:45	Ayhan Öz 70'	Report		Referee: (Romania) Alexandru Pirvu

26 April 1970 Round 25	Göztepe	2–2	Mersin İdmanyurdu	Alsancak Stadium, İzmir
Sunday, 15:30	John Nielsen 75'; Çağlayan Derebaşı 85' (pen.)	Report	23' Muharrem Algıç; 39' Alp Sümeralp	Referee: Orhan Gönül

3 May 1970 Round 26	Mersin İdmanyurdu	3–1	Ankara Demirspor	Tevfik Sırrı Gür Stadium, Mersin
Sunday, 15:00	Tarık Kutver 60'; Octavian Popescu 82'; İbrahim Arayıcı 85'	Report	37' Aydoğan Aygan	Referee: Fehmi Pazarcı

9 May 1970 Round 27	PTT	1–1	Mersin İdmanyurdu	19 Mayıs Stadium, Ankara
Saturday, 15:15	Feridun Köse 42'	Report	66' Osman Arpacıoğlu	Referee: (Germany) Alfred Kohler

17 May 1970 Round 28	Mersin İdmanyurdu	0–0	Beşiktaş	Tevfik Sırrı Gür Stadium, Mersin
Sunday, 15:30		Report		Referee: Nevzat Tansuk

23 May 1970 Round 29	İstanbulspor	3–0	Mersin İdmanyurdu	Ali Sami Yen Stadium, Istanbul
Saturday, 15:30	Ahmet Altuntaş 26'; Kostas Kasapoğlu 48'; Ahmet Gündoğdu 49'	Report		Referee: Veli Necdet Arığ

30 May 1970 Round 30	Ankaragücü	3–0	Mersin İdmanyurdu	19 Mayıs Stadium, Ankara
Saturday, 15:15	Mehmet Uğursal 7'; Metin Yılmaz 49'; Coşkun Süer 64'; Sakıp Özberk (red card) 31'	Report	(red card) 31' Cihat Erbil	Referee: Müşfik Talas

== 1969–70 Turkish Cup participation ==
1969–70 Turkish Cup was played for the 8th season as Türkiye Kupası by 30 teams. Two elimination rounds (including one preliminary round) and finals were played in two-legs elimination system. Mersin İdmanyurdu participated in 1969–70 Turkish Cup from the first round and was eliminated at second round by then second division team Kütahyaspor. Kütahyaspor was eliminated at semifinals. Göztepe won the Cup for the 2nd time.

=== Cup track ===
The drawings and results Mersin İdmanyurdu (MİY) followed in 1969–70 Turkish Cup are shown in the following table.

Round	Own League	Opponent's League	Opponent	A	H	Result
Round 1	First League	Second League White Group	Boluspor	1–3	2–0	Promoted to R2 P
Round 2 Preliminary	First League	Amateur	Adana Sümerspor	7–0	5–0	Promoted to R2
Round 2	First League	Second League White Group	Kütahyaspor	0–1	1–1	Eliminated

Note: In the above table 'Score' shows For and Against goals whether the match played at home or not.

=== Game details ===
Mersin İdmanyurdu (MİY) 1969–70 Turkish Cup game reports is shown in the following table. Kick off times are in EET and EEST.

3 September 1969 Round 1 Leg 1	Boluspor	3–1	Mersin İdmanyurdu	City Stadium, Bolu
Wednesday, 17:00	Soner Metiner 31'; Manuel Mendoza 53'; Soner Metiner 77'	Report	64' (pen.) Osman Arpacıoğlu

24 September 1969 Round 1 Leg 2	Mersin İdmanyurdu	2–0	Boluspor	Tevfik Sırrı Gür Stadium, Mersin
Wednesday, 15:45	Tarık Kutver 25'; Refik Çoğum 65'	Report		Referee: Macit Sarıdana

29 October 1969 Round P2 Leg 1	Mersin İdmanyurdu	5–0	Adana Sümerspor	Tevfik Sırrı Gür Stadium, Mersin
Wednesday, 14:30	İbrahim Arayıcı 15'; Muharrem Algıç 22'; Ayhan Öz 30' (pen.); İbrahim Arayıcı 55'; Erol Durmuşlu 76'	Report		Referee: Orhan Korkmaz

18 October 1969 Round P 2 Leg 2	Adana Sümerspor	0–7	Mersin İdmanyurdu	City Stadium, Adana
Tuesday, 14:00		Report	30' İbrahim Arayıcı; 32' Muharrem Algıç; 38' Muharrem Algıç; 50' Ali Açıkgöz; 52' Ali Açıkgöz; 70' Tarık Kutver; 78' Octavian Popescu

3 December 1969 Round 2 Leg 1	Mersin İdmanyurdu	1–1	Kütahyaspor	Tevfik Sırrı Gür Stadium, Mersin
Wednesday, 14:15	Osman Arpacıoğlu 68'	Report	85' Kemal Keskin	Referee: Cevdet Güvenli

4 March 1970 Round 2 Leg 2	Kütahyaspor	1–0	Mersin İdmanyurdu	Dumlupınar Stadium, Kütahya
Wednesday, 14:30	Ali Öktem 79' (H)	Report		Referee: Ertuğrul Dilek

Source: 1969–70 Turkish Cup pages.

== Management ==
=== Club management ===
Mehmet Karamehmet was club president.

=== Coaching team ===
1969–70 Mersin İdmanyurdu head coaches:

Nat	Head coach	Period	Pl	W	D	L	Notes
(Turkey)	Bülent Giz	01.08.1969 – 31.05.1970					

Note: Only official games were included.

== 1969–70 squad ==
Stats are counted for 1969–70 First League matches and 1969–70 Turkish Cup (Türkiye Kupası) matches. In the team rosters four substitutes were allowed to appear, two of whom were substitutable. Only the players who appeared in game rosters were included and listed in the order of appearance.

O	N	Nat	Name	Birth	Born	Pos	LA	LG	CA	CG	TA	TG	Booked	Sent off (straight red)	← Season Notes →
1	1	(Turkey)	Fikret Özdil	1943		GK	30		3		33				→ previous season.
2	2	(Turkey)	Cihat Erbil	1946	Alpullu	DF	30		5		35			1	→ previous season.
3	3	(Turkey)	Erol Evcimen	1944		DF	30		5		35				1969 ST Feriköy.
4	4	(Turkey)	Halim Kütükçüoğlu	1938		DF	10		2		12				→ previous season.
5	5	(Turkey)	Mustafa Yürür	26 Jun 1938	Istanbul	MF	30	2	5		35	2			1969 ST İzmirspor.
6	6	(Turkey)	Refik Çoğum	1940		MF	4		1	1	5	1			→ previous season.
7	7	(Turkey)	Alp Sümeralp (C)	1938	Istanbul	FW	28	1	4		32	1			→ previous season.
8	8	(Turkey)	Erol Durmuşlu	1 Nov 1950	Silifke	FW	11		2	1	13	1			→ previous season.
9	9	(Turkey)	Tarık Kutver	1940	Ezine	FW	26	5	5	2	31	7			→ previous season.
10	10	(Turkey)	Muharrem Algıç	1948	Istanbul	FW	30	5	5	3	35	8			→ previous season.
11	11	(Turkey)	Ayhan Öz	20 Jul 1945	Mersin	FW	27	3	4	1	30	4			→ previous season.
12	11	(Turkey)	Ali Açıkgöz	1945	Istanbul	FW	26	2	4	2	30	4			→ previous season.
13	13	(Turkey)	İbrahim Arayıcı	1949	Silifke	FW	17	5	2	3	19	8			→ previous season.
14	9	(Romania)	Octavian Popescu	25 Apr 1938	Bucharest	FW	21	3	4	1	25	4			1969 ST Rapid București.
15	5	(Turkey)	Arif Omaç	1942		MF	12		2		14				→ previous season.
16	9	(Turkey)	Osman Arpacıoğlu	5 Jan 1947	Ankara	FW	21	6	3	2	27	8		1	→ previous season.
17	1	(Czechoslovakia)	Justín Javorek	14 Sep 1936	Czechoslovakia	GK	2				2				1969 ST Inter Bratislava.
18	12	(Turkey)	Taner Carin	1945	Istanbul	GK	1		1		2				→ previous season.
19	2	(Turkey)	İbrahim Tezeren	31 Jan 1948	Tekirdağ	DF	3		1		4				→ previous season.

Sources: 1969–70 season squad data from maçkolik com, Milliyet, and Erbil (1975).

Transfer news from Milliyet:

- Transfers in: Right-back Erol was transferred from Feriköy. Mustafa (İzmirspor). K.İbrahim, Erol, Şener, Cemil, Necati, Yusuf, Mahir (amateur).
- Transfers out: After the end of season, forward Ali went to İstanbulspor, 17.07.1970. Arif (Sakaryaspor), B.İbrahim (Tekirdağspor).

== See also ==
- Football in Turkey
