= 1970–71 Mersin İdmanyurdu season =

Mersin İdmanyurdu
1970–71 season
- President: Mehmet Karamehmet
- Coach: (Turkey) Bülent Giz
- Stadium: Mersin, Turkey
- First League: 11th
- Turkish Cup: Eliminated at R2
- Top goalscorer: (Turkey) Osman Arpacıoğlu (14)
Home colours	Away colours	Third colours

Mersin İdmanyurdu (also Mersin İdman Yurdu, Mersin İY, or MİY) Sports Club; located in Mersin, east Mediterranean coast of Turkey in 1970–71. The 1970–71 season was the fourth season of Mersin İdmanyurdu (MİY) football team in Turkish First Football League, the first level division in Turkey. They finished eleventh in the league. They also took place in Turkish Cup and eliminated at second round.

Mehmet Karamehmet was president. Erol Tarhan was general captain. Mahir Turhan, Sezai Sak, Orhan Mutlu were executive committee member.

== Pre-season ==
MİY opened new season on 10.08.1970. Preparation games:

- 23.08.1970 - Bursaspor-MİY.
- 05.09.1970 - Galatasaray-MİY: 2–0. Saturday 17:00. Ali Sami Yen Stadium, İstanbul. Referees: Nazif Oturgan, Necmettin Çakan, Adnan Paksüt. Galatasaray: Nihat (Yasin), Ekrem, Tuncay, Muzaffer, Aydın, Ahmet, Ergün, Uğur, Gökmen, Metin, Ayhan. Goals: Metin 10', Gökmen 40'. Coach: Coşkun Özarı. MİY: Fikret, Taner, B.Erol, Cihat, Mustafa, Refik, Akın, Ayhan, Osman, İbrahim, Alp, Muharrem. Coach: Bülent Giz.

== 1970–71 First League participation ==
First League was played with 16 teams in its 13th season, 1970–71. Last two teams relegated to Second League 1971–72. Mersin İY became 11th with 11 wins, and Osman Arpacıoğlu was most scorer player with 14 goals

=== Results summary ===
Mersin İdmanyurdu (MİY) 1970–71 First League summary:

	Overall									Home								Away							
Stage	Pc	Pl	W	D	L	GF	GA	GD	Pt	Pl	W	D	L	GF	GA	GD	Pt	Pl	W	D	L	GF	GA	GD	Pt
First half	7	15	5	5	5	14	11	+3	15	8	5	3	0	11	3	+8	13	7	0	2	5	3	8	-5	2
Second half		15	6	1	8	13	15	-2	13	7	5	1	1	7	2	+5	11	8	1	0	7	6	13	-7	2
Overall	11	30	11	6	13	27	26	+1	28	15	10	4	1	18	5	+13	24	15	1	2	12	9	21	-12	4

Sources: 1970–71 Turkish First Football League pages.

=== League table ===
Mersin İY's league performance in First League in 1970–71 season is shown in the following table. At the end of the season coach Bülent Giz declared that he will no longer train the team in the next season.

Pos	Team	Pld	W	D	L	GF	GA	GD	Pts
9	MKE Ankaragücü	30	7	17	6	18	17	+1	31
10	Samsunspor	30	10	9	11	29	33	−4	29
11	Mersin İdman Yurdu	30	11	6	13	27	26	+1	28
12	Karşıyaka	30	8	11	11	15	27	−12	27
13	Boluspor	30	6	12	12	17	31	−14	24

Rules for classification: 1) points; 2) goal difference; 3) number of goals scored.

Note: Won, drawn and lost points are 2, 1 and 0. F belongs to MİY and A belongs to corresponding team for both home and away matches.

=== Results by round ===
Results of games MİY played in 1970–71 First League by rounds:

Round	1	2	3	4	5	6	7	8	9	10	11	12	13	14	15	16	17	18	19	20	21	22	23	24	25	26	27	28	29	30
Ground	H	A	H	A	H	A	A	H	H	A	H	A	H	A	H	A	H	A	H	A	H	H	A	A	H	A	H	A	H	A
Result	W	L	D	L	W	L	L	W	D	D	D	L	W	D	W	L	W	L	W	L	W	W	L	L	L	W	W	L	D	L
Position	6	11	10	11	7	12	12	11	10	10	9	11	9	8	7	9	8	10	10	10	9	8	9	11	11	11	10	11	10	11

Source: 1970–71 Turkish First Football League pages.
A = Away; H = Home; W = Win; D = Draw; L = Loss

=== First half ===
20 September 1970 Round 1	Mersin İdmanyurdu	1 – 0	Boluspor	Tevfik Sırrı Gür Stadium, Mersin
Sunday, 15:15	Osman Arpacıoğlu 85'	Report		Referee: Vedat Sığındıre

26 September 1970 Round 2	PTT	1 – 0	Mersin İdmanyurdu	19 Mayıs Stadium, Ankara
Saturday, 15:30	Haydar Tuncer 12'	Report		Referee: Muzaffer Sarvan

4 October 1970 Round 3	Mersin İdmanyurdu	0 – 0	Eskişehirspor	Tevfik Sırrı Gür Stadium, Mersin
Sunday, 15:00		Report		Referee: Ahmet Bagatır

11 October 1970 Round 4	Samsunspor	1 – 0	Mersin İdmanyurdu	City Stadium, Samsun
Sunday, 14:15	İhsan Özbek 71'	Report		Referee: Ertuğrul Aybay

24 October 1970 Round 5	Mersin İdmanyurdu	3 – 0	Bursaspor	Tevfik Sırrı Gür Stadium, Mersin
Saturday, 14:45	Osman Arpacıoğlu 25'; Ayhan Öz 44'; Osman Arpacıoğlu, 77'	Report		Referee: Nihat Özbirgül

31 October 1970 Round 6	İstanbulspor	4 – 3	Mersin İdmanyurdu	Mithatpaşa Stadium, Istanbul
Saturday, 14:45	Ali Açıkgöz 7' (F); Cemil Turan 47' (F); Bilge Tarhan 55' (F); Tayfun Kalkavan 87' (F)	Report	10' Osman Arpacıoğlu; 16' Osman Arpacıoğlu; 69' Osman Arpacıoğlu	Referee: İbrahim Fırla

8 November 1970 Round 7	Altay	1 – 0	Mersin İdmanyurdu	Alsancak Stadium, İzmir
Sunday, 15:00	Ayfer Elmastaşoğlu 58'	Report		Referee: Macit Sarıdana

15 November 1970 Round 8	Mersin İdmanyurdu	2 – 0	Galatasaray	Tevfik Sırrı Gür Stadium, Mersin
Sunday, 14:30	Muharrem Algıç 65'; Osman Arpacıoğlu 69'; Ayhan Öz (red card) 80'	Report	(red card) 80' Tuncay Temeller	Referee: Fehmi Pazarcı

22 November 1970 Round 9	Mersin İdmanyurdu	1 – 1	Fenerbahçe	Tevfik Sırrı Gür Stadium, Mersin
Sunday, 14:15	Alp Sümeralp 44'	Report	3' Ogün Altıparmak	Referee: Sabahattin Ladikli

29 November 1970 Round 10	Ankaragücü	0 – 0	Mersin İdmanyurdu	19 Mayıs Stadium, Ankara
Sunday, 14:15		Report		Referee: Ekrem Yenci

6 December 1970 Round 11	Mersin İdmanyurdu	1 – 1	Ankara Demirspor	Tevfik Sırrı Gür Stadium, Mersin
Sunday, 14:00	Osman Arpacıoğlu 69'	Report	9' Sedat Boğaz	Referee: Yavuz Tunç

20 December 1970 Round 12	Göztepe	1 – 0	Mersin İdmanyurdu	Alsancak Stadium, İzmir
Sunday, 14:30	Ertan Öznur 48'	Report		Referee: Vedat Sığındere

27 December 1970 Round 13	Mersin İdmanyurdu	1 – 0	Beşiktaş	Tevfik Sırrı Gür Stadium, Mersin
Sunday, 13:45	Ayhan Öz 25'	Report		Referee: Sabahattin Ladikli

2 January 1971 Round 14	Vefa	0 – 0	Mersin İdmanyurdu	Mithatpaşa Stadium, Istanbul
Saturday, 14:15		Report		Referee: Muzaffer Sarvan

10 January 1971 Round 15	Mersin İdmanyurdu	2 – 1	Karşıyaka	Tevfik Sırrı Gür Stadium, Mersin
Sunday, 13:15	Osman Arpacıoğlu 55'; Osman Arpacıoğlu 87'	Report	74' Atilla Biçer; (red card) 88' Doğan Terim	Referee: Nevzat Tansuk

=== Second half ===
14 February 1971 Round 16	Boluspor	1 – 0	Mersin İdmanyurdu	City Stadium, Bolu
Sunday, 14:30	Salim Görür 80'	Report		Referee: Nihat Özbirgül

21 February 1971 Round 17	Mersin İdmanyurdu	1 – 0	PTT	Tevfik Sırrı Gür Stadium, Mersin
Sunday, 14:15	Ayhan Öz 5' (F)	Report		Referee: Nail Dinçer

28 February 1971 Round 18	Eskişehirspor	3 – 1	Mersin İdmanyurdu	Atatürk Stadium, Eskişehir
Sunday, 14:30	Fethi Heper 13'; Vahap Özbayer 65' (pen.)	Report	83' (o.g.) Erol Evcimen; 87' Osman Arpacıoğlu	Referee: Vedat Sığındere

7 March 1971 Round 19	Mersin İdmanyurdu	2 – 0	Samsunspor	Tevfik Sırrı Gür Stadium, Mersin
Sunday, 14:15	Muharrem Algıç 15'; Octavian Popescu 60'	Report		Referee: Veli Necdet Arığ

14 March 1971 Round 20	Bursaspor	1 – 0	Mersin İdmanyurdu	Atatürk Stadium, Bursa
Sunday, 14:45	Mesut Şen 59'	Report		Referee: Müşfik Talas

21 March 1971 Round 21	Mersin İdmanyurdu	1 – 0	İstanbulspor	Tevfik Sırrı Gür Stadium, Mersin
Sunday, 14:30	Osman Arpacıoğlu 63'	Report		Referee: Ziya Türkdoğan

28 March 1971 Round 22	Mersin İdmanyurdu	2 – 1	Altay	Tevfik Sırrı Gür Stadium, Mersin
Sunday, 14:30	İbrahim Arayıcı 29'	Report	3' (o.g.) Enver Katip; 5' Hıdır Bilek	Referee: Sedat Özselçuk

4 April 1971 Round 23	Galatasaray	2 – 0	Mersin İdmanyurdu	Ali Sami Yen Stadium, Istanbul
Sunday, 15:00	Mehmet Oğuz 17'; Aydın Güleş 51'	Report		Referee: Orhan Gönül

11 April 1971 Round 24	Fenerbahçe	2 – 1	Mersin İdmanyurdu	Ali Sami Yen Stadium, Istanbul
Sunday, 15:00	Ogün Altıparmak 47' (pen.); Ogün Altıparmak 71'	Report	50' Erol Evcimen	Referee: Nihat Özbirgül

2 May 1971 Round 25	Mersin İdmanyurdu	0 – 1	Ankaragücü	Tevfik Sırrı Gür Stadium, Mersin
Sunday, 15:45		Report	84' (pen.) Ömer Tokgöz	Referee: Hilmi Ok

9 May 1971 Round 26	Ankara Demirspor	0 – 3	Mersin İdmanyurdu	19 Mayıs Stadium, Ankara
Sunday, 15:00		Report	1' Ayhan Öz; 50' (pen.) Osman Arpacıoğlu; 89' Naşit Atvur	Referee: Fehmi Pazarcı

16 May 1971 Round 27	Mersin İdmanyurdu	1 – 0	Göztepe	Tevfik Sırrı Gür Stadium, Mersin
Sunday, 15:30	Ayhan Öz 75'	Report		Referee: Veli Necdet Arığ

23 May 1971 Round 28	Beşiktaş	2 – 0	Mersin İdmanyurdu	Mithatpaşa Stadium, Istanbul
Sunday, 19:00	Davut Şahin 61'; Faruk Karadoğan 87'	Report		Referee: Ertuğrul Aybay

30 May 1971 Round 29	Mersin İdmanyurdu	0 – 0	Vefa	Tevfik Sırrı Gür Stadium, Mersin
Sunday, 15:30		Report		Referee: Cevdet Güvenli

5 June 1971 Round 30	Karşıyaka	2 – 1	Mersin İdmanyurdu	Alsancak Stadium, İzmir
Saturday, 20:00	Burhan Gürel 72'; Rasin Gürcan 85'	Report	58' Osman Arpacıoğlu	Referee: Şani Güllü

== 1970–71 Turkish Cup participation ==
1970–71 Turkish Cup was played for the 9th season as Türkiye Kupası by 25 teams. Two elimination rounds (including one preliminary round) and finals were played in two-legs elimination system. Mersin İdmanyurdu participated in 1970–71 Turkish Cup from the first round and was eliminated at second round by Eskişehirspor. Eskişehirspor won the Cup for the first time.

=== Cup track ===
The drawings and results Mersin İdmanyurdu (MİY) followed in 1970–71 Turkish Cup are shown in the following table.

Round	Own League	Opponent's League	Opponent	A	H	Result
Round 1	First League	Second League White Group	Kütahyaspor	1–1	2–0	Promoted to R2
Round 2	First League	First League	Eskişehirspor	0–2	0–0	Eliminated

Note: In the above table 'Score' shows For and Against goals whether the match played at home or not.

=== Game details ===
Mersin İdmanyurdu (MİY) 1970–71 Turkish Cup game reports is shown in the following table. Kick off times are in EET and EEST.

28 October 1970 Round 1 Leg 1	Mersin İdmanyurdu	2 – 0	Kütahyaspor	Tevfik Sırrı Gür Stadium, Mersin
Wednesday, 14:30	İbrahim Arayıcı 57'; Muharrem Algıç 81'	Report		Referee: Hilmi Ok

23 December 1970 Round 1 Leg 2	Kütahyaspor	1 – 1	Mersin İdmanyurdu	Dumlupınar Stadium, Kütahya
Wednesday, 14:15	Kemal Keskin 89'	Report	32' Ayhan Öz	Referee: İlhan Özkan

31 January 1971 Round 2 Leg 1	Eskişehirspor	2 – 0	Mersin İdmanyurdu	Atatürk Stadium, Eskişehir
Sunday, 14:00	Faik Şentaşlar 40' (F); Ender Konca 89'	Report		Referee: Yavuz Tunç

7 February 1971 Round 2 Leg 2	Mersin İdmanyurdu	0 – 0	Eskişehirspor	Tevfik Sırrı Gür Stadium, Mersin
Sunday, 14:00		Report		Referee: Macit Sarıdana

Source: 1970–71 Turkish Cup pages.

== Management ==
=== Club management ===
Mehmet Karamehmet was club president.

=== Coaching team ===
1970–71 Mersin İdmanyurdu head coaches:

Nat	Head coach	Period	Pl	W	D	L	Notes
(Turkey)	Bülent Giz	01.08.1970 – 31.05.1971					

Note: Only official games were included.

== 1970–71 squad ==
Stats are counted for 1970–71 First League matches and 1970–71 Turkish Cup (Türkiye Kupası) matches. In the team rosters four substitutes were allowed to appear, two of whom were substitutable. Only the players who appeared in game rosters were included and listed in the order of appearance.

O	N	Nat	Name	Birth	Born	Pos	LA	LG	CA	CG	TA	TG	Yellow card	Red card	← Season Notes →
1	1	(Turkey)	Fikret Özdil	1943		GK	18		2		20				→ previous season.
2	2	(Turkey)	Erol Evcimen	1944		DF	28	1	4		29	1			→ previous season.
3	3	(Turkey)	Akın Aksaçlı	1947		DF	29		4		33				1970 ST Galatasaray.
4	4	(Turkey)	Mustafa Yürür	26 Jun 1938	Istanbul	MF	30		4		34				→ previous season.
5	5	(Turkey)	Refik Çoğum	1940		MF	21		1		22				→ previous season.
6	6	(Turkey)	Naşit Atvur		Istanbul	FW	8	1	1		9	1			1970 ST Galatasaray.
7	7	(Turkey)	İbrahim Arayıcı	1949	Silifke	FW	23	1	1	1	24	2			→ previous season.
8	8	(Turkey)	Muharrem Algıç	1948	Istanbul	FW	30	2	4	1	34	3			→ previous season.
9	9	(Turkey)	Osman Arpacıoğlu	5 Jan 1947	Ankara	FW	30	14	4		34	14			→ previous season.
10	10	(Turkey)	Ayhan Öz	20 Jul 1945	Mersin	FW	24	5	3	1	28	6			→ previous season.
11	11	(Turkey)	Alp Sümeralp (C)	1938	Istanbul	FW	30	1	4		34	1			→ previous season.
12	13	(Turkey)	Erol Durmuşlu	1 Nov 1950	Silifke	FW	11		4		15				→ previous season.
13	14	(Turkey)	Muhlis Gülen	1947		FW	20		3		23				1970 ST Galatasaray.
14	2	(Turkey)	Cihat Erbil	1946	Alpullu	DF	26		4		30				→ previous season.
15	1	(Turkey)	Taner Carin	1945	Istanbul	GK	13		3		16				→ previous season.
16	4	(Turkey)	Halim Kütükçüoğlu	1938		DF	6				6				→ previous season.
17	8	(Romania)	Octavian Popescu	25 Apr 1938	Bucharest	FW	9	1			9	1			→ previous season.

Sources: 1970–71 season squad data from maçkolik com, Milliyet, and Erbil (1975).

News from Milliyet:

- Akın, Muhlis and Naşit were transferred from Galatasaray, 14.07.1970.
- Erol was included in "Ümit milli takım" (U-21 national team) for Balkan U-21 championship in Sofia between 8–15 June 1970.
- Transfers out: At end of the season Muharrem (Fenerbahçe), forward Osman (Fenerbahçe), Ayhan and Refik were transferred out. Tarık went to Giresunspor in mid-season.

== See also ==
- Football in Turkey
