= 1968–69 Mersin İdmanyurdu season =

Mersin İdmanyurdu
1968–69 season
- President: Mehmet Karamehmet
- Coach: (Turkey) Turgay Şeren
- Stadium: Mersin, Turkey
- First League: 6th
- Turkish Cup: Eliminated at R1
- Top goalscorer: (Turkey) Osman Arpacıoğlu (14)
Home colours	Away colours	Third colours

Mersin İdmanyurdu (also Mersin İdman Yurdu, Mersin İY, or MİY) Sports Club; located in Mersin, east Mediterranean coast of Turkey in 1968–69. Mersin İdmanyurdu (MİY) football team took place in Turkish First Football League, the first level division for the second time in 1968–69 season. They finished sixth. They have eliminated from Turkish Cup at first round. They represented Turkey in a friendly cup played in Tehran, Iran. Osman Arpacıoğlu became the first player of MİY capped in Turkey national football team when he was playing in the team.

Executive committee: Mehmet Karamehmet (president); Mahir Turhan, Ünal Şıhman (vice-presidents); Erol Tarhan (general captain); Şinasi Develei (general secretary); Şükrü Soydan (club director); Çetin Hocaer (treasurer); Cemal Evrim (audit); Sedat Gülergün, Aydın Özlü, Yılmaz Ok, Sadık Eliyeşil, Sungur Baydur, Necati Bolkan (members). Club address: Bahçelievler/Mersin. Tel. no: none. Turgay Şeren was the head coach; Bayram Birinci was his assistant. Şeren had targeted 10th position before the start of the season, but the team performed better.

== Pre-season ==
Preparation games:

- 11.08.1968 - MİY-Antalyaspor: 2-0. Sunday. Mersin.
- 18.08.1968 - Antalyaspor-MİY: 2-2. Sunday. Antalya.
- 25.08.1968 - MİY-PTT: 3-1. Sunday. Mersin.
- 01.09.1968 - Ispartaspor-MİY: 0-2. Sunday. Isparta.
- 08.09.1968 - MİY-Gençlerbirliği: 1-0. Sunday. Mersin. Goal: Osman (P).

== 1968–69 First League participation ==
First League was played with 16 teams in its eleventh season, 1968–69. Last two teams relegated to Second League 1969–70. Mersin İY became sixth with 11 wins, and Osman Arpacıoğlu was most scorer player with 14 goals.

Coach Turgay Şeren declared that the team was very young (age average was 21) and that they will fight for championship next year. However, he resigned after the end of season. It was Şeren's first experience in his coaching career. Şeren left the team at the end of the season, on 9 July 1969.

=== Results summary ===
Mersin İdmanyurdu (MİY) 1968–69 First League summary:

	Overall									Home								Away							
Stage	Pc	Pl	W	D	L	GF	GA	GD	Pt	Pl	W	D	L	GF	GA	GD	Pt	Pl	W	D	L	GF	GA	GD	Pt
First half	7	15	6	4	5	16	12	+4	16	7	5	2	0	10	1	+9	12	8	1	2	5	6	11	-5	4
Second half		15	5	5	5	19	17	+2	15	8	5	2	1	11	3	+8	12	7	0	3	4	8	14	-6	3
Overall	6	30	11	9	10	35	29	+6	31	15	10	4	1	21	4	+17	24	15	1	5	9	14	25	-11	7

Sources: 1968–69 Turkish First Football League pages.

=== League table ===
Mersin İY's league performance in First League in 1968–69 season is shown in the following table.

Pos	Team	Pld	W	D	L	GF	GA	GD	Pts	Qualification or relegation
4	Fenerbahçe	30	13	9	8	34	25	+9	35	
5	Bursaspor	30	12	8	10	32	28	+4	32	
6	Mersin İdman Yurdu	30	11	9	10	35	29	+6	31	
7	Göztepe	30	9	12	9	30	26	+4	30	Qualification to Cup Winners' Cup first round
8	İstanbulspor	30	9	11	10	27	30	−3	29	

Rules for classification: 1) points; 2) goal difference; 3) number of goals scored.

Won, drawn and lost points are 2, 1 and 0. F belongs to MİY and A belongs to corresponding team for both home and away matches.

=== Results by round ===
Results of games MİY played in 1968–69 First League by rounds:

Round	1	2	3	4	5	6	7	8	9	10	11	12	13	14	15	16	17	18	19	20	21	22	23	24	25	26	27	28	29	30
Ground	H	A	H	A	H	A	H	A	H	A	H	A	H	A	A	A	H	A	H	A	H	A	H	A	H	A	H	A	H	H
Result	W	D	D	D	W	L	W	L	W	W	W	L	D	L	L	L	W	D	W	L	D	L	W	D	L	D	W	L	D	W
Position	2	4	4	5	1	4	3	5	4	3	2	4	3	5	7	9	6	6	5	6	5	6	5	5	5	5	5	5	6	6

Source: 1968–69 Turkish First Football League pages.
A = Away; H = Home; W = Win; D = Draw; L = Loss

=== First half ===
15 September 1968 Round 1	Mersin İdmanyurdu	2 – 1	Bursaspor	Tevfik Sırrı Gür Stadium, Mersin
Sunday, 16:00	Tarık Kutver 3' (F); Osman Arpacıoğlu 69' (F)	Report	85' (H) Haluk Erdemoğlu	Referee: Cezmi Başar

22 September 1968 Round 2	Altınordu	2 – 2	Mersin İdmanyurdu	Alsancak Stadium, İzmir
Sunday, 16:00	Stefhan Balov 5'; Sümer Atasoy 22'	Report	34' Tarık Kutver; 48' Osman Arpacıoğlu	Referee: Hüseyin Maloğlu

29 September 1968 Round 3	Mersin İdmanyurdu	0 – 0	Beşiktaş	Tevfik Sırrı Gür Stadium, Mersin
Sunday, 15:30		Report		Referee: Veli Necdet Arığ

6 October 1968 Round 4	Altay	0 – 0	Mersin İdmanyurdu	Alsancak Stadium, İzmir
Sunday, 13:30		Report		Referee: Ziya Türkdoğan

13 October 1968 Round 5	Mersin İdmanyurdu	5 – 0	Şekerspor	Tevfik Sırrı Gür Stadium, Mersin
Sunday, 14:30	Osman Arpacıoğlu 9' (F); Osman Arpacıoğlu 16' (H); Osman Arpacıoğlu 33' (pen.); Tarık Kutver 36'	Report	80' (o.g.) Rıfat Negiz	Referee: Nejat Şener

27 October 1968 Round 6	Vefa	2 – 1	Mersin İdmanyurdu	Ali Sami Yen Stadium, Istanbul
Sunday, 13:15	Zeki Temizer 2'; Bekir Psav 35' (pen.)	Report	47' Ayhan Öz	Referee: Ertuğrul Dilek

3 November 1968 Round 7	Mersin İdmanyurdu	1 – 0	Gençlerbirliği	Tevfik Sırrı Gür Stadium, Mersin
Sunday, 14:30	Alp Sümeralp 62'	Report		Referee: Faruk Talu

17 November 1968 Round 8	PTT	2 – 1	Mersin İdmanyurdu	19 Mayıs Stadium Ankara
Sunday, 14:15	Aydın Güleş 10'; Feridun Köse 39'	Report	47' Osman Arpacıoğlu	Referee: Fehmi Pazarcı

24 November 1968 Round 9	Mersin İdmanyurdu	1 – 0	İzmirspor	Tevfik Sırrı Gür Stadium, Mersin
Sunday, 14:15	Ayhan Öz 42'	Report		Referee: Ömer Karadağ

1 December 1968 Round 10	Fenerbahçe	0 – 1	Mersin İdmanyurdu	Ali Sami Yen Stadium, Istanbul
Sunday, 14:00		Report	34' (F) Osman Arpacıoğlu	Referee: Cezmi Başar

15 December 1968 Round 11	Mersin İdmanyurdu	1 – 0	İstanbulspor	Tevfik Sırrı Gür Stadium, Mersin
Sunday, 14:15	Osman Arpacıoğlu 15'	Report		Referee: Nevzat Tansuk

22 December 1968 Round 12	Göztepe	1 – 0	Mersin İdmanyurdu	Alsancak Stadium, İzmir
Sunday, 14:30	Ertan Öznur 40'	Report		Referee: Ömer Karadağ

26 January 1969 Round 13	Mersin İdmanyurdu	0 – 0	Ankara Demirspor	Tevfik Sırrı Gür Stadium, Mersin
Sunday, 14:15		Report		Referee: Doğan Babacan

5 January 1969 Round 14	Galatasaray	3 – 1	Mersin İdmanyurdu	Ali Sami Yen Stadium, Istanbul
Sunday, 14:30	Ayhan Elmastaşoğlu 47'; Ahmet Celović 58'; Ahmet Celović 85'	Report	4' Ali Açıkgöz	Referee: Macit Sarıdana

12 January 1969 Round 15	Eskişehirspor	1 – 0	Mersin İdmanyurdu	Atatürk Stadium, Eskişehir
Sunday, 14:15	Ender Konca 64'	Report		Referee: Nazif Oturgan

=== Second half ===
16 February 1969 Round 16	Bursaspor	3 – 2	Mersin İdmanyurdu	Atatürk Stadium, Bursa
Sunday, 14:45	Ersel Altıparmak 35' (H); Cemal Topaloğlu 42' (H); Mesut Şen (penalty missed) 67'; Müfit Gürsu 68' (H)	Report	33' (F) Muharrem Algıç; 44' (F) Refik Çoğum	Referee: Doğan Babacan

23 February 1969 Round 17	Mersin İdmanyurdu	2 – 0	Altınordu	Tevfik Sırrı Gür Stadium, Mersin
Sunday, 14:30	Osman Arpacıoğlu 65'; Osman Arpacıoğlu 71'	Report		Referee: Veli Necdet Arığ

2 March 1969 Round 18	Beşiktaş	2 – 2	Mersin İdmanyurdu	Mithatpaşa Stadium, Istanbul
Sunday, 13:00	Faruk Karadoğan 3'; Ahmet Özacar 29'	Report	54' Osman Arpacıoğlu; 76' Alp Sümeralp	Referee: Fehmi Pazarcı

9 April 1969 Round 19	Mersin İdmanyurdu	2 – 0	Altay	Tevfik Sırrı Gür Stadium, Mersin
Wednesday, 15:00	Tarık Kutver 70'; İbrahim Arayıcı 85'	Report		Referee: Cezmi Başar

23 April 1969 Round 20	Şekerspor	2 – 1	Mersin İdmanyurdu	19 Mayıs Stadium, Ankara
Wednesday, 15:00	Ata Özbay 6'; Cengiz Erkazan 87'	Report	10' Muharrem Algıç	Referee: (Germany) Johannes Malka

23 March 1969 Round 21	Mersin İdmanyurdu	1 – 1	Vefa	Tevfik Sırrı Gür Stadium, Mersin
Sunday, 15:00	Alp Sümeralp 31'	Report	30' Zeki Temizer	Referee: Zülbahar Sağnak

29 March 1969 Round 22	Gençlerbirliği	3 – 0	Mersin İdmanyurdu	19 Mayıs Stadium, Ankara
Sunday, 14:45	Burhan Tözer 1'; Zeynel Soyuer 34'; Hayrettin Endersert 54'	Report		Referee: (Switzerland) Anton Bucheli

6 April 1969 Round 23	Mersin İdmanyurdu	2 – 1	PTT	Tevfik Sırrı Gür Stadium, Mersin
Sunday, 15:00	Osman Arpacıoğlu 67'; Kadri Aytaç 80'	Report	12' (pen.) Ertan Adatepe	Referee: Zeki Gürkan

12 April 1969 Round 24	İzmirspor	1 – 1	Mersin İdmanyurdu	Alsancak Stadium, İzmir
Saturday, 15:45	Mustafa Yürür 52'	Report	42' Osman Arpacıoğlu	Referee: (Switzerland) Joseph Heimann

20 April 1969 Round 25	Mersin İdmanyurdu	0 – 1	Fenerbahçe	Tevfik Sırrı Gür Stadium, Mersin
Sunday, 15:00		Report	83' Salim Görür	Referee: Sabahattin Ladikli

26 April 1969 Round 26	İstanbulspor	0 – 0	Mersin İdmanyurdu	Mithatpaşa Stadium, Istanbul
Saturday, 15:15		Report		Referee: Zülbahar Sağnak

4 May 1969 Round 27	Mersin İdmanyurdu	2 – 0	Göztepe	Tevfik Sırrı Gür Stadium, Mersin
Sunday, 15:15	İbrahim Arayıcı 27'; Osman Arpacıoğlu 55'	Report		Referee: Macit Sarıdana

11 May 1969 Round 28	Ankara Demirspor	3 – 2	Mersin İdmanyurdu	19 Mayıs Stadium, Ankara
Sunday, 15:15	Nail Kokanali 17'; Birol Aşar 22' (pen.); Fikri Elma 80'	Report	34' Ali Açıkgöz; 83' Arif Omaç	Referee: Ömer Karadağ

18 May 1969 Round 29	Mersin İdmanyurdu	0 – 0	Galatasaray	Tevfik Sırrı Gür Stadium, Mersin
Sunday, 15:15		Report		Referee: Cezmi Başar

25 May 1969 Round 30	Mersin İdmanyurdu	2 – 0	Eskişehirspor	Tevfik Sırrı Gür Stadium, Mersin
Sunday, 15:30	Ali Açıkgöz 7'; Muharrem Algıç 52'	Report		Referee: (Germany) Rudolf Kreitlein

== 1968–69 Turkish Cup participation ==
1968–69 Turkish Cup was played for the 7th season as Türkiye Kupası by 31 teams. Two elimination rounds (including one preliminary round) and finals were played in two-legs elimination system. Mersin İdmanyurdu participated in 1968–69 Turkish Cup and was eliminated at first round by Bursaspor. Bursaspor was eliminated in semifinals by Göztepe who won the Cup for the first time.

=== Cup track ===
The drawings and results Mersin İdmanyurdu (MİY) followed in 1968–69 Turkish Cup are shown in the following table.

Round	Own League	Opponent's League	Opponent	A	H	Result
Round 1	First League	First League	Bursaspor	0–2	1–2	Eliminated

Note: In the above table 'Score' shows For and Against goals whether the match played at home or not.

=== Game details ===
Mersin İdmanyurdu (MİY) 1968–69 Turkish Cup game reports is shown in the following table. Kick off times are in EET and EEST.

20 October 1968 Round 1 Leg 1	Mersin İdmanyurdu	1 – 2	Bursaspor	Tevfik Sırrı Gür Stadium, Mersin
Sunday, 14:30	Osman Arpacıoğlu 17' (pen.)	Report	6' Cemal Topaloğlu; 80' Özkan Gürgün	Referee: Nevzat Tansuk

9 November 1968 Round 1 Leg 2	Bursaspor	2 – 0	Mersin İdmanyurdu	Atatürk Stadium, Bursa
Saturday, 14:30	Ersel Altıparmak 50'; Taner Çığıraç 66'	Report		Referee: Sedat Özselçuk

Source: 1968–69 Turkish Cup pages.

== 1969 Friendship Cup ==
MİY represented Turkey in 1969 Friendship Cup played in Tehran, Iran. The tournament was play in honour of Shah Reza Pahlavi's birthday. MİY took third place.

round	date/hour	venue	referee	home team	result	away team
R1	6 March 1969	Tehran		Mersin İdmanyurdu (Turkey)	4-1	Pakistan
R2	9 March 1969	Tehran		Iran	2-1	(Turkey) Mersin İdmanyurdu
R3	11 March 1969	Tehran		Spartak Moscow (Soviet Union)	2-0	(Turkey) Mersin İdmanyurdu
R4	13 March 1969	Tehran		Mersin İdmanyurdu (Turkey)	1-0	Iraq

- 06.03.1969 - MİY-Pakistan: 4–1.
- 09.03.1969 - Iran-MİY: 2–1.
- 11.03.1969 - Spartak Moscow-MİY: 2–0.
- 13.03.1969 - MİY-Iraq: 1–0. Goal: Ali 20'.

== Management ==
=== Club management ===
Mehmet Karamehmet was club president.

=== Coaching team ===
1968–69 Mersin İdmanyurdu head coaches:

Nat	Head coach	Period	Pl	W	D	L	Notes
(Turkey)	Turgay Şeren	01.08.1968 – 31.05.1969					

Note: Only official games were included.

== 1968–69 squad ==
Stats are counted for 1968–69 First League matches and 1968–69 Turkish Cup (Türkiye Kupası) matches. In the team rosters four substitutes were allowed to appear, two of whom were substitutable. Only the players who appeared in game rosters were included and listed in the order of appearance.

O	N	Nat	Name	Birth	Born	Pos	LA	LG	CA	CG	TA	TG	Booked	Sent off (straight red)	← Season Notes →
1	1	(Turkey)	Taner Carin	1945	Istanbul	GK	12		1		13				1968 ST Galata G.K.
2	2	(Turkey)	İhsan Temen	1938		DF	15		2		17				→ previous season.
3	3	(Turkey)	Cihat Erbil	1946	Alpullu	DF	24		2		26				1968 ST Bandırmaspor.
4	4	(Turkey)	Halim Kütükçüoğlu	1938		DF	24		2		26				→ previous season.
5	5	(Turkey)	Refik Çoğum (C)	1940		MF	28	1	2		30	1			→ previous season.
6	6	(Turkey)	Arif Omaç	1942		MF	23	1	2		25	1			1968 ST Feriköy.
7	7	(Turkey)	Ali Açıkgöz	1945	Istanbul	FW	27	3	1		28	3			→ previous season.
8	8	(Turkey)	Tarık Kutver	1940	Ezine	FW	18	4			18	4			→ previous season.
9	9	(Turkey)	Muharrem Algıç	1948	Istanbul	FW	19	3			19	3			1968 ST Boluspor.
10	10	(Turkey)	Osman Arpacıoğlu	5 Jan 1947	Ankara	FW	30	14	2	1	32	15			→ previous season.
11	11	(Turkey)	Kadri Aytaç	6 Aug 1931	Istanbul	FW	22	1	1		23	1			→ previous season.
12	10	(Turkey)	Alp Sümeralp	1938	Istanbul	FW	25	3	1		26	3			→ previous season.
13	1	(Turkey)	Fikret Özdil	1943		GK	23		1		24				→ previous season.
14	13	(Turkey)	İbrahim Tezeren	31 Jan 1948	Tekirdağ	DF	7		1		8				1968 ST Tekirdağspor.
15	10	(Turkey)	Ayhan Öz	20 Jul 1945	Mersin	FW	25	2	2		27	2			→ previous season.
16	2	(Turkey)	Fikri Pehlivan	1948		DF	2				2				→ previous season.
17	7	(Turkey)	Abdullah Turgut	1943		FW	7		2		9				→ previous season.
18	15	(Turkey)	İbrahim Arayıcı	1949	Silifke	FW	9		2		11				First time professional.
19	7	(Turkey)	Erol Durmuşlu	1 Nov 1950	Silifke	FW	6				6				First time professional.
20	6	(Turkey)	Olcay Başarır	1949		FW	17		2		19				1968 ST Boluspor.
21	3	(Turkey)	Aydın Ünsal	1942		MF	1				1				1968 ST Şekerspor.

Sources: 1968–69 season squad data from maçkolik.com, Milliyet, and Erbil (1975).

Transfer news from Milliyet:

- Summer transfers: Taner (Galata), Yurdaer (Kasımpaşa), Cihat (Bandırnaspor), İbrahim (Tekirdağspor), Şefik (İskenderunspor 1967), Arif (Feriköy SK), Muharrem (Boluspor), Mustafa (Konya İdmanyurdu). Amateurs: Erdinç, İbrahim, Erol (Silifkespor), Olcay (Boluspor), Tevfik (Tarsus İdmanyurdu). Abdullah (amateur).
- Transfers out: Olcay (Galatasaray); İhsan (Gençlerbirliği). Necdet (Feriköy). Yurdaer (Vefa).

National team appearances:

- Osman was capped in national team against Saudi Arabia (03.01.1969) and Poland (27.04.1969). İbrahim was capped in U-21 national team for Balkan U-21 tournament in Romania between 22 and 29 June 1969.

After the season Kadri put an end to his player career and later become a manager.

- 08.06.1969 - Kadri's jubilee match, MİY against Celebrities. Sunday, 17:00. Tevfik Sırrı Gür Stadium, Mersin. Celebrities-MİY: 5-5. Referee: Kemal Bunu. Celebrities: Turgay, Ercan, Basri, Yusuf, Talat, Kaya, Ogün, Şeref, Metin, Can, Uğur. Substitutions: Varol, Süreyya, Faruk, Muzaffer, Abdullah, Ahmet Şahin, Yaşar, Gökmen, Mazlum, Akın, Çeloviç, Harun. MİY: Fikret, Halim, Alp, Abdullah, İbrahim, Kadri, Ali, Tarık, Osman, Ayhan, Erol. Goals (in order): Metin, Ogün, Can, Kadri, Uğur, Kadri, Uğur, Osman, Kadri, Kadri. President Mehmet Karamehmet and Governor Nihat Bor presented cups to Kadri.

== See also ==
- Football in Turkey
