= Bülent Giz =

Turkish football manager

Personal information
- Date of birth: 1925
- Place of birth: Turkey

Senior career*
Years	Team	Apps	(Gls)
- Galatasaray

Managerial career
- 1957–63: Yeşildirek
- 1964–66: Beykoz
- 1966–69: PTT Gençlik
- 1969–71: Mersin İdmanyurdu
- 1972–73: PTT Gençlik
- 1973–74: Sakaryaspor
- 1974–75: Mersin İdmanyurdu
- 1975–76: Karagümrük
- 1981–82: Neusiedl See
- 1982–83: Alibeyköyspor
- * Club domestic league appearances and goals

Bülent Giz (born 1925) was a Turkish football player and later manager who played for Galatasaray; and managed PTT Gençlik and Mersin İdmanyurdu in the 1960s and 1970s.

After finishing his football career, he became a sport journalist. He watched the 1958 World Cup as a journalist and saw the Brazilian national football team's football. After turning to Turkey he decided to be a football manager and became the first practitioner of Brazilian football style in Turkey.

== Manager career ==
His first manager experience was started in Yeşildirek (an Istanbul amateur team which was supported by taxi drivers in European side of the city) as assistant manager. He took the team from fourth division in Istanbul. The team became champions every year and promoted to 1961–62 Turkish First Football League. PTT has promoted to first division while he was coaching this team in 1971–72 Turkish Second Football League. Under his management, in 1969–70, Mersin İdmanyurdu fought for championship of then top level division Turkish First Football League 1969–70 but finished fourth by goal average. In 1970–71, Mersin İdmanyurdu finished league in 11th place and then he left the team.

Managing years:

- 1957–58 – 1962–63: (Yeşikdirek S.K.; from amateur league as assistant manager; first division as manager 1961–62 saved non-relegation, 1962–63 relegated).
- 1964–65 – 1965–66: Beykoz; first division (1964–65 secured non-relegation at last week, 1965–66 relegated)
- 1966–67 – 1968–69: PTT Gençlik; first division (1966–67 7th, 1967–68 7th, 1968–69 7th).
- 1969–70 – 1970–71: Mersin İdmanyurdu (1969-70, 1970-71); first division (1969–70 4th, 1970–71 11th).
- 1971–72 – 1972–73: PTT Gençlik (took from second division and promoted to first division 1972–73; then relegated).
- 1973–74: Sakaryaspor; second division (2nd after Trabzonspor).
- 1974–75: Mersin İdmanyurdu (1974–75); second division (3rd).
- 1975–76: Karagümrük; second division.
- 1981–82: Neusiedl See (an Austrian second league team from Klagenfurt).
- 1982–83: Alibeyköyspor; second division (9th).

== Personal ==
Bülent Giz was married to Esin Germen on 18 February 1975 when he was managing Mersin İdmanyurdu. It was Giz's third marriage. Marriage was solemnized by then Mersin Mayor Kaya Mutlu.
