= 1989–90 Turkish Cup =

Türkiye Kupası

Tournament details
- Country: Turkey
- Teams: 72

Final positions
- Champions: Beşiktaş (3rd title)
- Runners-up: Trabzonspor

Tournament statistics
- Matches played: 45
- Goals scored: 167 (3.71 per match)
- Top goal scorer(s): Feyyaz Uçar (4 goals)

The 1989–90 Turkish Cup was the 28th edition of the annual tournament that determined the association football Süper Lig Turkish Cup (Turkish: Türkiye Kupası) champion under the auspices of the Turkish Football Federation (Turkish: Türkiye Futbol Federasyonu; TFF). Beşiktaş successfully contested Trabzonspor 2–0 in the final.

== First round ==
Team 1	Score	Team 2
Göztepe	0–1	Alanyaspor
Altay	3–2	Antalyaspor
Denizlispor	7–0	Yeni Salihlispor
Edirnespor	2–3 (aet)	Kartalspor
Erzincanspor	3–3 (1–2 p)	Rizespor
Erzurumspor	4–2 (aet)	Çarşambaspor
Eskişehirspor	3–1	Kocaelispor
Gençlerbirliği	5–2	Kahramanmaraşspor
Giresunspor	3–0	Akçaabat Sebatspor
İnegölspor	2–0	Zeytinburnu
İskenderunspor	1–0	Petrol Ofisi
Kardemir Karabükspor	0–1	Bakırköyspor
Samsunspor	2–1 (aet)	Orduspor
Siirt YSE Spor	2–2 (4–5 p)	Gaziantepspor
PTT	1–0	Mersin İdman Yurdu
Altınordu	1–3	Kuşadasıspor

== Second round ==
Team 1	Score	Team 2
Rizespor	4–3	Erzurumspor
Alanyaspor	0–1	Denizlispor
Eskişehirspor	2–0 (aet)	Kartalspor
Gaziantepspor	3–1	PTT
İnegölspor	3–1	Bakırköyspor
İskenderunspor	1–2	Gençlerbirliği
Kuşadasıspor	0–0 (3–0 p)	Altay
Samsunspor	4–3	Giresunspor

== Third round ==
Team 1	Score	Team 2
Rizespor	1–0	Samsunspor
Gaziantepspor	1–2	Gençlerbirliği
Denizlispor	1–0	Kuşadasıspor
İnegölspor	2–1	Eskişehirspor

== Fourth round ==
Team 1	Score	Team 2
Gençlerbirliği	3–1	Denizlispor
İnegölspor	1–1 (5–6 p)	Rizespor

== Fifth round ==
Team 1	Score	Team 2
Malatyaspor	3–1	Adanaspor
Adana Demirspor	1–4	Bursaspor
Ankaragücü	2–2 (4–3 p)	Gençlerbirliği
Beşiktaş	5–2	Rizespor
Boluspor	5–2	Konyaspor
Fenerbahçe	1–0	Karşıyaka
Sakaryaspor	1–3	Trabzonspor
Sarıyer	3–2	Galatasaray

== Quarter-finals ==
Team 1	Score	Team 2
Boluspor	0–5	Beşiktaş
Bursaspor	5–2	Malatyaspor
Fenerbahçe	3–2	Ankaragücü
Sarıyer	1–1 (3–4 p)	Trabzonspor

== Semi-finals ==
=== Summary table ===
Team 1	Score	Team 2
Beşiktaş	3–0	Fenerbahçe
Bursaspor	2–2 (6–7 p)	Trabzonspor

=== Matches ===
21 March 1990 Semi-final	Beşiktaş	3–0	Fenerbahçe	Istanbul
13:30 EET (UTC+02)	Necat 10' (pen.); Feyyaz 29'; Mehmet 72'			Stadium: BJK İnönü Stadium; Referee: Yüksel Okçuoğlu

21 March 1990 Semi-final	Bursaspor	2–2 (a.e.t.) (6–7 p)	Trabzonspor	Bursa
13:30 EET (UTC+02)	Erhan 16', 116'		Hamdi 72'; Hami 110'	Stadium: Bursa Atatürk Stadium; Referee: Özcan Oal

== Final ==
2 May 1990 Final	Beşiktaş	2–0	Trabzonspor	İzmir, Turkey
19:15 EEST (UTC+03)	Feyyaz 68'; Mehmet 74'			Stadium: İzmir Atatürk Stadium; Referee: Hasan Ceylan
