= Giz =

Giz or GIZ may refer to:

== People ==
- Giz Watson (born 1957), Australian politician
- Bülent Giz (born 1925), Turkish footballer
- Sadık Giz (1911–1979), Turkish politician
- nickname for Gisele Lagace (born 1970), webcomic author and artist

== Other uses ==
- Deutsche Gesellschaft für Internationale Zusammenarbeit, the German Federal Enterprise for International Cooperation
- Jizan Regional Airport, in Saudi Arabia
- South Giziga language
