= 1969–70 1.Lig =

12th season of top-tier Turkish football

1.Lig
- Season: 1969–70
- Champions: Fenerbahçe; 6th title
- Relegated: Gençlerbirliği; Altınordu
- European Cup: Galatasaray
- Cup Winners' Cup: Göztepe
- Inter-Cities Fairs Cup: Eskişehirspor
- Matches played: 240
- Goals scored: 419 (1.75 per match)
- Top goalscorer: Fethi Heper (13 goals)

Statistics of the Turkish First Football League for the 1969–70 season.

== Overview ==
It was contested by 16 teams, and Fenerbahçe S.K. won the championship.

== League table ==
Pos	Team	Pld	W	D	L	GF	GA	GD	Pts	Qualification or relegation
1	Fenerbahçe (C)	30	17	10	3	31	6	+25	44	Qualification to European Cup first round
2	Eskişehirspor	30	14	9	7	46	26	+20	37	Invitation to Inter-Cities Fairs Cup first round
3	Altay	30	13	10	7	27	17	+10	36	Invitation to Balkans Cup
4	Mersin İdman Yurdu	30	12	12	6	32	27	+5	36	
5	Göztepe A.Ş.	30	12	11	7	33	29	+4	35	Qualification to Cup Winners' Cup first round
6	Samsunspor	30	11	9	10	24	28	−4	31	
7	Bursaspor	30	10	10	10	26	20	+6	30	
8	Galatasaray	30	10	10	10	27	21	+6	30	
9	Beşiktaş	30	10	10	10	26	26	0	30	
10	İstanbulspor	30	10	9	11	30	27	+3	29	
11	MKE Ankaragücü	30	7	13	10	19	23	−4	27	
12	Ankara Demirspor	30	6	14	10	25	31	−6	26	
13	Vefa	30	7	11	12	19	28	−9	25	
14	Türk Telekomspor	30	7	11	12	21	34	−13	25	
15	Gençlerbirliği (R)	30	7	8	15	17	33	−16	22	Relegation to Turkish Second Football League
16	Altınordu A.Ş. (R)	30	5	7	18	16	43	−27	17	Relegation to Turkish Second Football League

Rules for classification: 1) points; 2) goal difference; 3) number of goals scored.
(C) Champions; (R) Relegated

== Results ==
Home \ Away	ALT	ATO	AND	BJK	BUR	ESK	FNB	GAL	GEN	GÖZ	İST	MİY	AGÜ	PTT	SAM	VEF
Altay		0–0	1–1	1–0	1–0	1–1	0–0	1–0	4–0	1–0	1–2	1–0	0–0	1–0	2–0	0–0
Altınordu	0–3		2–1	1–2	1–0	0–1	0–0	0–0	0–0	1–2	1–0	2–2	1–0	4–0	1–2	0–0
Ankara Demirspor	0–0	2–0		2–0	1–0	1–1	1–1	0–1	0–1	1–1	0–1	2–2	1–1	2–0	1–1	2–1
Beşiktaş	2–0	1–0	1–0		0–0	3–1	0–1	0–0	2–0	1–0	3–1	0–0	2–3	0–1	3–2	0–0
Bursaspor	1–0	2–0	1–0	0–0		3–0	0–0	2–0	4–0	1–1	1–1	0–2	3–0	2–0	1–0	2–0
Eskişehirspor	2–0	5–0	2–0	2–0	3–0		1–0	1–0	2–1	5–2	2–0	1–1	0–0	4–2	4–1	0–0
Fenerbahçe	2–0	2–0	0–0	0–1	2–0	2–1		1–0	0–0	4–0	2–0	1–1	1–0	2–0	2–0	1–0
Galatasaray	0–1	2–0	0–0	1–1	0–0	2–2	1–0		1–0	0–0	2–3	2–1	2–0	1–1	2–0	4–1
Gençlerbirliği	2–0	2–0	2–2	3–1	1–0	1–0	0–1	0–3		0–1	0–0	1–2	0–0	0–3	0–1	1–0
Göztepe	1–0	1–1	1–2	3–1	2–1	1–1	0–1	2–1	1–0		1–0	2–2	0–0	2–0	3–0	1–1
İstanbulspor	1–3	4–0	4–1	0–0	2–0	0–0	0–2	0–0	1–0	1–1		3–0	0–0	0–0	3–1	1–2
Mersin İdman Yurdu	0–0	1–0	3–1	0–0	2–1	1–0	0–0	1–0	1–0	2–2	1–0		1–0	2–0	0–0	3–1
MKE Ankaragücü	1–3	2–0	0–0	1–1	0–0	1–1	0–1	2–0	0–0	0–0	1–0	3–0		1–2	0–1	2–1
PTT	1–1	3–1	1–1	1–0	0–0	0–3	0–0	1–0	0–0	1–0	0–0	1–1	0–1		2–2	0–1
Samsunspor	0–1	1–0	2–0	0–0	1–1	2–0	0–0	0–0	0–0	0–1	2–1	1–0	2–0	1–0		0–0
Vefa	0–0	2–0	0–0	2–1	0–0	1–0	0–2	0–2	3–2	0–1	0–1	2–0	0–0	1–1	0–1	

Source: TFF, Mackolik
Legend: Blue = home team win; Yellow = draw; Red = away team win.
