= 1962–63 Mersin İdmanyurdu season =

Mersin İdmanyurdu
1962–63 season
- President: Mehmet Karamehmet
- Stadium: Mersin, Turkey
- Turkey Amateur Championship: Champions
- Turkish Cup: Eliminated in R2

Mersin İdmanyurdu (also Mersin İdman Yurdu, Mersin İY, or MİY) Sports Club; located in Mersin, east Mediterranean coast of Turkey in 1962–63. Mersin İdmanyurdu (MİY) football team became Turkey Amateur Champions in 1963. Previous to the 1962–63 season the team had shown an increasing performance. The team's main aim was to be included in the national league. This aim was realized in 1963. When the team became the champions of amateurs in Turkey, the Federation decided to form a second level national division. Next year ÇİY was included in the Second League. Due to sponsorship reasons the team's name was Çukurova İdmanyurdu between 1957 and 1966.

== 1962–63 season league participation ==
=== Preparation games ===
- 16.02.1963 - ÇİY-PTT. First match of the tournament in which ÇİY, PTT and U18 national team participated.
- 25.02.1963 - ÇİY-U18 National Team: 2-1. Youth National team plated a preparation game with ÇİY for the national match against Greece. Goals: 14' and 21' (o.g.) (ÇİY), Onursal (National team).
- 16.03.1963 - Ankaragücü-ÇİY. Adana Şehir Stadı. First day of the tournament organized by Akınspor club and Ankaragücü, ÇİY, Beşiktaş and Göztepe participated.

=== Turkey Amateur Football Championship group stage ===
Games played in Mersin group:

- Çukurova İdmanyurdu-Şekerspor: 3-1.
- Çukurova İdmanyurdu-Kayseri Sümerspor: 3-1.
- Çukurova İdmanyurdu-Diyarbakır Yıldızspor: 2-1.
- Çukurova İdmanyurdu-Reyhanlı Gençlik: 5-1. 10.06.1963. Mersin. ÇİY became group winner.

=== Turkey Amateur Football Championship finals ===
Turkey Amateur Football Championship finals were played in Konya, 19 Mayıs Stadium. Participating teams were İzmir Karagücü, Trabzon İdmangücü, Eskişehir Şekerspor, Çukurova İdmanyurdu. The games started on 22 June 1963, Saturday. Each team played two games with other teams.

Game results:

- Day 1 - 22.06.1963 - ÇİY-İzmir Karagücü: 4-0. Saturday, 16:30. Konya. Goals: Abdi 11', 69', 77' and Zafer 67'.
- Day 1 - 22.06.1963 - Trabzon İdmangücü-Eskişehir Şekerspor: 4-1. Saturday, 18:15. Konya. Goals: Hüseyin 19', Orhan 30', 61', Cenap 83' and B. Metin 73' (Şekerspor).
- Day 2 - 23.06.1963 - ÇİY-Eskişehir Şekerspor: 2-2. Sunday, 16:30. Konya. Goals: Mesut, İbrahim, Hakkı, Orhan.
- Day 2 - 23.06.1963 - İzmir Karagücü-Trabzon İdmangücü: 3-1. Sunday, 18:15. Konya.
- Day 3 - 25.06.1963 - ÇİY-Trabzon İdmangücü: 1-1. Tuesday, 16:30. Konya. Goals: MİY:Hüseyin. Goal: Hüseyin 18'. Trabzon İdmangücü: Cevat, Cenap, Ergin. Goal: Cevat 38'.
- Day 3 - 25.06.1963 - İzmir Karagücü-Eskişehir Şekerspor: 2-1. Tuesday, 18:15. Konya.

ÇİY finished the first half at first place with one win and 2 draws (2 points for a win). Karagücü was second, İdmangücü was third, and Şekerspor was fourth.

- Day 4 - 27.06.1963 - Trabzon İdmangücü-Eskişehir Şekerspor: 3-2. Thursday, 16:30. Konya.
- Day 4 - 27.06.1963 - ÇİY-İzmir Karagücü: 5-0. Thursday, 18:15. Konya. Goals: Selahattin, Arif, Hüseyin (2), Abdu.
- Day 5 - 29.06.1963 - İzmir Karagücü-Trabzon İdmangücü: 1-4. Saturday, 16:30. Konya.
- Day 5 - 29.06.1963 - ÇİY-Eskişehir Şekerspor: 2-2. Saturday, 18:15. Konya. ÇİY: Goals: Hüseyin, Alp. E.Şeker: Goals: Necmi, İbrahim.
- Day 6 - 30.06.1963 - İzmir Karagücü-Eskişehir Şekerspor: 0-3. Sunday, 16:30. Konya.
- Day 6 - 30.06.1963 - ÇİY-Trabzon İdmangücü: 3-2. Sunday, 18:15. Konya. Attendance: 3000. ÇİY: Rızkullah, Nevzat, Muammer, Emin, Ahmet, Oktay, Rona, Uğur, Selahattin, Hüseyin, Alp. Goals: Selahattin 35'(H), Roni 55', Hüseyin 62'. Trabzon İdmangücü: Goals: Ergin 30'(H), Necati 74'(P). Sent off: Şener 44'.

ÇİY became the champions for the first time. In the next season ÇİY was accepted to Turkish Second Football League founded that year (1963–64). At the end of the season President Karamehmet wanted Fenerbahçe player Basri as a player/manager for next season. Basri had some problems with his club.

== 1962–63 Turkish Cup participation ==
The Turkish Football Federation decided to change the formation of Federasyon Kupası (Federation Cup) in order to give a team to UEFA's European Cup Winner's Cup (ECW Cup) which was started in 1960–61.

The '65 club participated in the first Turkish Cup: 22 teams from National League (Milli Lig) (1), 27 teams from regional leagues (R) and 16 from amateurs (A). ÇİY had participated at the preliminary round among amateur teams. The one-leg system was accepted up to quarterfinals, after which the two-leg elimination rule applied. After round 3, quarterfinals came. Galatasaray had been the champions of the first Turkish Cup. At finals they beat Fenerbahçe 2-1. ÇİY was eliminated at Round 2. Since Galatasaray also won the league title, Fenerbahçe, as the finalists, became eligible for playing ECW Cup games the next year (1963-64).

Round	Own League	Opponent's League	Opponent	A/H	Score	Result
Round 1 Preliminary	Turkey Amateur Football Championship	Amateur	Sivas Karagücü	A	2-1	promoted to R1
Round 1	Turkey Amateur Football Championship	Amateur	Dicle Gençlik	H	1-0	promoted to R2
Round 2	Turkey Amateur Football Championship	First League	Karagümrük	H	0-2	eliminated

- Round 1 - Preliminary - 26.08.1962. Sunday, Sivas. Sivas Karagücü-ÇİY: 1-2.
- Round 1 - 02.09.1962 - Sunday. Adana. ÇİY-Diyarbakır Dicle Gençlik: 1-0.
- Round 2 - 23.09.1962 - ÇİY-Karagümrük: 0-2. Sunday. Adana. Referee: Nadi Irmaklar. ÇİY: Rızıkallah, Nevzat, Ergin, Demir, Ahmet, Oktay, Selahattin, Uğur, Abdi, Alp, Hüseyin. Karagümrük: Sümer, Orhan Metin, Özkan, Kadri, Doğan, Kemal, Tuncay, Nedim, K. Ali, Muharrem. Goals: K.Ali 65', Muharrem 71'.

== 1962–63 squad ==
no	nat	name	birth	born	pos	apps	Goal	Booked	Sent off (straight red)	notes

Rızıkallah, Nevzat, Ergin, Demir, Ahmet, Oktay, Selahattin, Uğur, Abdi, Alp, Hüseyin.

Midfield player Selahattin was capped in the Amateur National Team for the 4th Mediterranean Games.

== See also ==
- Football in Turkey
