= 1968–69 1.Lig =

11th season of top-tier Turkish football

1.Lig
- Season: 1968–69
- Champions: Galatasaray; 3rd title
- Relegated: Şekerspor; İzmirspor
- European Cup: Galatasaray
- Cup Winners' Cup: Göztepe
- Inter-Cities Fairs Cup: Altay
- Matches played: 240
- Goals scored: 471 (1.96 per match)
- Top goalscorer: Metin Oktay (17 goals)

Statistics of the Turkish First Football League for the 1968–69 season.

== Overview ==
It was contested by 16 teams, and Galatasaray S.K. won the championship.

== League table ==
Pos	Team	Pld	W	D	L	GF	GA	GD	Pts	Qualification or relegation
1	Galatasaray (C)	30	19	8	3	49	14	+35	46	Qualification to European Cup first round
2	Eskişehirspor	30	17	9	4	39	18	+21	43	Invitation to Balkans Cup
3	Beşiktaş	30	14	10	6	30	20	+10	38	
4	Fenerbahçe	30	13	9	8	34	25	+9	35	
5	Bursaspor	30	12	8	10	32	28	+4	32	
6	Mersin İdman Yurdu	30	11	9	10	35	29	+6	31	
7	Göztepe	30	9	12	9	30	26	+4	30	Qualification to Cup Winners' Cup first round
8	İstanbulspor	30	9	11	10	27	30	−3	29	
9	Türk Telekomspor	30	9	10	11	28	37	−9	28	
10	Gençlerbirliği	30	8	11	11	28	26	+2	27	
11	Altay	30	7	12	11	20	23	−3	26	Invitation to Inter-Cities Fairs Cup first round
12	Ankara Demirspor	30	8	10	12	29	35	−6	26	
13	Vefa	30	8	8	14	27	37	−10	24	
14	Altınordu	30	6	12	12	20	40	−20	24	
15	Beypazarı Şekerspor (R)	30	6	9	15	24	44	−20	21	Relegation to Turkish Second Football League
16	İzmirspor (R)	30	4	12	14	19	39	−20	20	Relegation to Turkish Second Football League

Rules for classification: 1) points; 2) goal difference; 3) number of goals scored.
(C) Champions; (R) Relegated

== Results ==
Home \ Away	ALT	ATO	AND	BJK	BUR	ESK	FNB	GAL	GEN	GÖZ	İST	İZM	MİY	PTT	ŞKR	VEF
Altay		1–1	2–0	0–0	0–2	0–1	0–0	0–2	1–0	1–0	0–0	2–0	0–0	2–0	2–0	2–0
Altınordu	2–1		0–0	0–1	1–1	0–0	0–1	0–2	1–0	1–0	0–0	1–1	2–2	2–0	3–1	0–0
Ankara Demirspor	0–0	1–3		0–2	2–1	0–2	1–1	1–1	2–1	0–1	0–0	6–1	3–2	0–0	2–0	1–4
Beşiktaş	1–0	1–0	0–0		2–2	0–0	1–2	0–2	1–0	1–1	1–0	2–0	2–2	1–1	3–1	1–0
Bursaspor	2–0	3–0	1–0	1–1		0–0	1–2	0–0	0–0	2–0	2–1	3–1	3–2	1–0	2–1	1–0
Eskişehirspor	0–0	5–0	2–0	2–1	1–1		1–0	0–2	2–1	1–0	3–0	1–0	1–0	4–2	1–0	2–1
Fenerbahçe	2–1	5–0	5–3	0–1	0–1	0–0		1–0	0–0	0–0	0–3	1–0	0–1	1–2	2–0	1–0
Galatasaray	1–0	4–0	1–0	1–0	2–0	2–2	1–1		1–0	2–0	1–1	3–1	3–1	5–0	4–2	1–0
Gençlerbirliği	3–3	1–0	0–0	0–2	1–0	1–1	0–1	2–1		1–1	4–0	1–0	3–0	1–2	1–1	0–0
Göztepe	0–0	0–0	3–1	3–0	2–0	1–0	1–1	0–0	0–0		2–2	0–1	1–0	1–1	3–1	4–0
İstanbulspor	2–1	0–0	0–1	0–1	1–0	1–2	2–3	0–0	2–1	3–1		1–1	0–0	2–1	2–0	0–0
İzmirspor	1–0	2–2	0–0	1–1	0–0	1–0	2–2	0–2	1–1	1–1	0–1		1–1	0–0	1–1	1–0
Mersin İdman Yurdu	2–0	2–0	0–0	0–0	2–1	2–0	0–1	0–0	1–0	2–0	1–0	1–0		2–1	5–0	1–1
PTT	0–0	1–1	1–0	0–1	2–0	0–2	2–1	1–0	1–2	0–2	2–0	1–0	2–1		1–1	1–1
Şekerspor	0–0	1–0	0–1	1–0	2–1	1–1	1–0	1–2	0–0	1–1	1–1	2–0	2–1	2–2		0–1
Vefa	1–1	3–0	1–4	0–2	2–0	1–2	0–0	0–3	1–3	3–1	1–2	2–1	2–1	1–1	1–0	

Source: TFF, Mackolik
Legend: Blue = home team win; Yellow = draw; Red = away team win.
