= 1970–71 1.Lig =

13th season of top-tier Turkish football

1.Lig
- Season: 1970–71
- Champions: Galatasaray; 4th title
- Relegated: Ankara Demirspor; Türk Telekomspor
- European Cup: Galatasaray
- Cup Winners' Cup: Eskişehirspor
- UEFA Cup: Fenerbahçe
- Matches: 240
- Goals: 445 (1.85 per match)
- Top goalscorer: Ogün Altıparmak (16 goals)

The following are the statistics of the Turkish First Football League for the 1970–71 season.

== Overview ==
It was contested by 16 teams, and Galatasaray S.K. won the championship.

== League table ==
Pos	Team	Pld	W	D	L	GF	GA	GD	Pts	Qualification or relegation
1	Galatasaray (C)	30	17	8	5	51	18	+33	42	Qualification to European Cup first round
2	Fenerbahçe	30	14	13	3	43	23	+20	41	Qualification to UEFA Cup first round
3	Göztepe A.Ş.	30	14	9	7	38	21	+17	37	Invitation to Balkans Cup
4	Eskişehirspor	30	10	14	6	29	24	+5	34	Qualification to Cup Winners' Cup first round
5	Bursaspor	30	11	12	7	25	25	0	34	
6	Beşiktaş	30	10	13	7	31	20	+11	33	
7	İstanbulspor	30	12	9	9	29	22	+7	33	
8	Altay	30	12	8	10	32	22	+10	32	
9	MKE Ankaragücü	30	7	17	6	18	17	+1	31	
10	Samsunspor	30	10	9	11	29	33	−4	29	
11	Mersin İdman Yurdu	30	11	6	13	27	26	+1	28	
12	Karşıyaka	30	8	11	11	15	27	−12	27	
13	Boluspor	30	6	12	12	17	31	−14	24	
14	Vefa	30	4	14	12	28	48	−20	22	
15	Ankara Demirspor (R)	30	3	12	15	17	37	−20	18	Relegation to Turkish Second Football League
16	Türk Telekomspor (R)	30	5	5	20	16	51	−35	15	Relegation to Turkish Second Football League

Rules for classification: 1) points; 2) goal difference; 3) number of goals scored.
(C) Champions; (R) Relegated

== Results ==
Home \ Away	ALT	AND	BJK	BOL	BUR	ESK	FNB	GAL	GÖZ	İST	KSK	MİY	AGÜ	PTT	SAM	VEF
Altay		2–0	0–0	5–1	4–0	0–0	0–0	0–1	2–0	2–1	1–2	1–0	2–1	2–0	4–0	0–1
Ankara Demirspor	0–0		1–1	1–0	0–0	1–1	1–1	1–5	0–1	1–0	0–0	0–3	0–2	2–0	0–1	2–2
Beşiktaş	0–0	2–0		4–1	0–1	2–2	0–2	1–1	1–0	1–0	3–0	2–0	3–3	1–1	2–1	2–0
Boluspor	1–0	0–0	0–0		0–0	2–1	0–1	1–2	1–0	1–1	0–0	1–0	0–0	2–1	2–1	1–1
Bursaspor	3–0	1–0	0–0	1–0		0–0	2–0	1–0	3–1	0–2	4–0	1–0	2–2	0–0	1–0	1–1
Eskişehirspor	2–1	3–1	1–0	0–0	0–0		2–2	0–3	1–0	3–1	2–0	3–1	0–0	1–0	0–0	3–2
Fenerbahçe	1–1	3–2	1–0	2–0	1–1	1–1		2–1	0–0	1–0	2–0	2–1	0–0	4–0	1–1	4–1
Galatasaray	2–0	1–0	1–1	3–0	2–0	0–0	1–1		3–0	2–1	0–0	2–0	0–1	7–1	1–0	2–0
Göztepe	0–0	1–1	0–0	2–1	2–0	3–1	3–1	1–1		1–0	1–0	1–0	1–1	3–0	5–2	6–0
İstanbulspor	2–0	2–1	1–0	1–0	0–0	1–0	1–0	3–0	0–0		0–1	4–3	1–1	2–0	1–0	0–0
Karşıyaka	2–1	1–0	0–0	0–0	1–0	1–0	0–0	0–0	0–2	1–1		2–1	0–0	0–0	1–0	1–1
Mersin İdman Yurdu	2–1	1–1	1–0	1–0	3–0	0–0	1–1	2–0	1–0	1–0	2–1		0–1	1–0	2–0	0–0
MKE Ankaragücü	0–0	1–0	0–0	0–0	0–0	0–2	0–1	0–1	0–0	0–0	1–0	0–0		0–1	1–1	1–0
PTT	0–1	1–0	0–1	2–2	1–2	0–0	0–3	1–7	0–2	0–1	1–0	1–0	0–1		2–0	2–3
Samsunspor	0–1	1–1	2–1	1–0	5–1	2–0	1–1	0–0	0–0	0–0	1–0	1–0	1–0	1–0		3–2
Vefa	0–1	0–0	0–3	0–0	0–0	0–0	2–4	0–2	1–2	2–2	3–1	0–0	1–1	2–1	3–3	

Source: TFF, Mackolik
Legend: Blue = home team win; Yellow = draw; Red = away team win.

== See also ==
- Doping in association football (Galatasaray's doping practice)
