= Mersin Talim Yurdu =

Sports club in Turkey

- Full name: Mersin Talim Yurdu Spor Kulübü Derneği
- Nickname: Kırmızı Şeytanlar (The Red Devils)
- Founded: 16 August 1925; 100 years ago
- Dissolved: 30 June 2019
- Ground: Mersin Arena, Mersin, Turkey
- Capacity: 25,534
- President: Şevket Varan
- Website: www.mersinidmanyurdu.com.tr
Home colours	Away colours	Third colours

Mersin İdman Yurdu was a Turkish sports club from Mersin, Turkey in the eastern Mediterranean Region. The team played in the Turkish first division for 15 seasons, and after the 1983–84 season the football team played in the Turkish second and third divisions. The team was promoted to the Turkish second level division after the 2008–09 season. MİY became the champions of the Turkish second division during the 2010–11 season and earned promotion to the Turkish Süper Lig during the 2011–12 season. Tevfik Sırrı Gür Stadium was the previous ground of the team with a capacity of 10,125. In 2013, their new 25,534 person capacity stadium, Mersin Arena, was inaugurated on 23 March 2013 with a TFF First League match against Gaziantep Büyükşehir Belediyespor. Their main rivals were Adana Demirspor, Adanaspor and Tarsus İdman Yurdu, and were friendly with Bucaspor.

== Name ==
The name "Mersin İdman Yurdu" originated as the Turkish equivalent of "Mersin Sports Club". In the beginning of the Republic, many of the sports clubs carried the names as such. Later, most of those clubs, either by merging or renaming, changed their names. The "İdman Yurdu" name remained for some clubs throughout the country. Later it lost its meaning. Therefore, "İdman Yurdu" has become a particular name for the club. Then, the club adopted the name "Mersin İdmanyurdu Sports Club". In its original form, the club's name is written separately. However, because of the norm that noun phrases which have lost their meaning are written contiguously, the team's name has become "Mersin İdmanyurdu". Today, both depictions are common in Turkish for MİY: Some write it separately (In Turkish, abbreviations are possible, even if the words had been conjunct). Club website has shown divergent interests.

Their nickname is Şeytanlar (meaning "Devils") or Kırmızı Şeytanlar ("Red Devils"). Their song is "Şampiyon yap bizi / Cehennemde yak bizi" ("Make us the champs / Burn us in hellfire").

== History ==
Club logo in the 1960s

Club logo in the 1970s

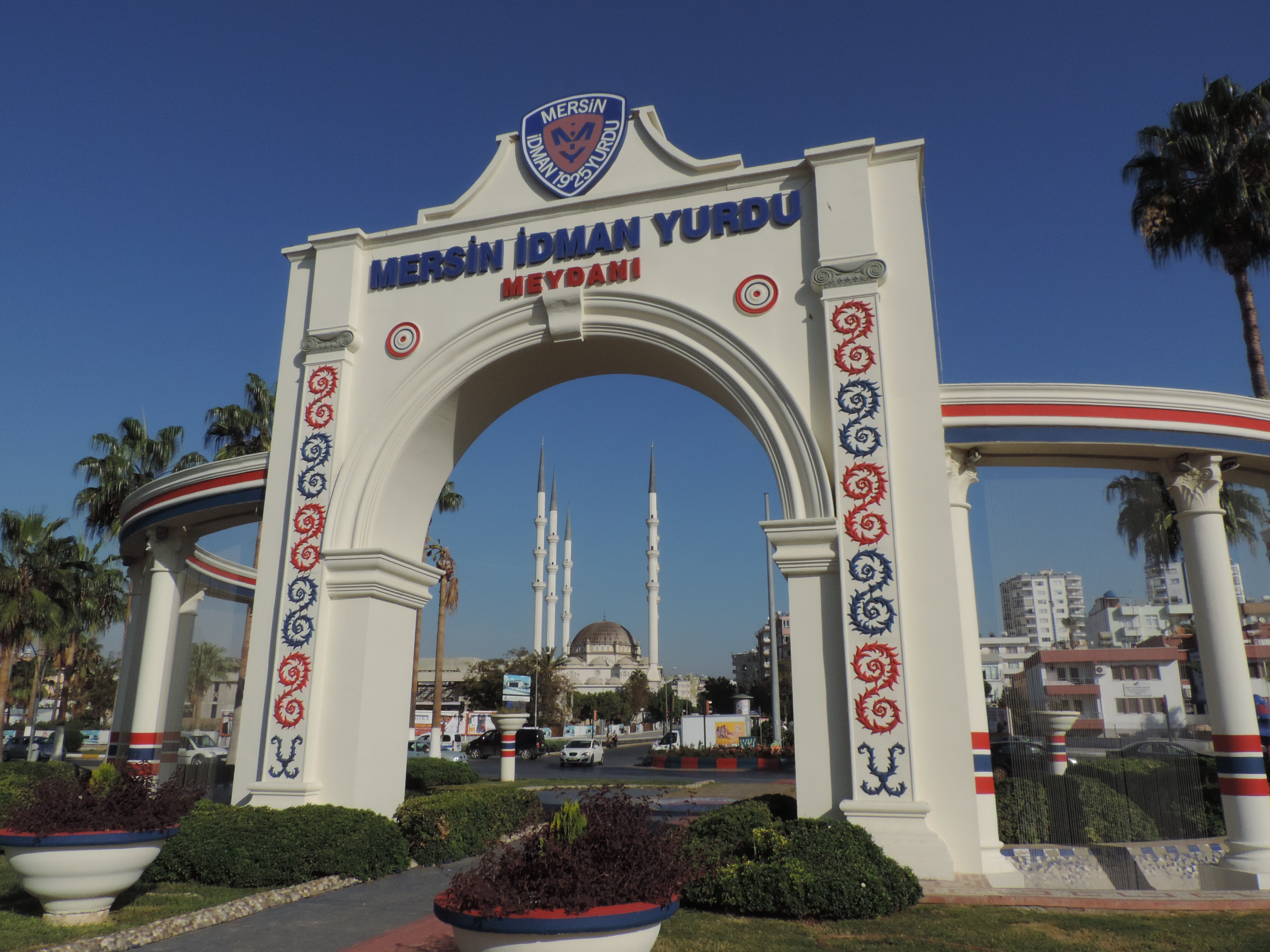
Mersin İdman Yurdu park, a part of Mersin coastal park reserved for Mersin İdman Yurdu, with view to Muğdat Mosque

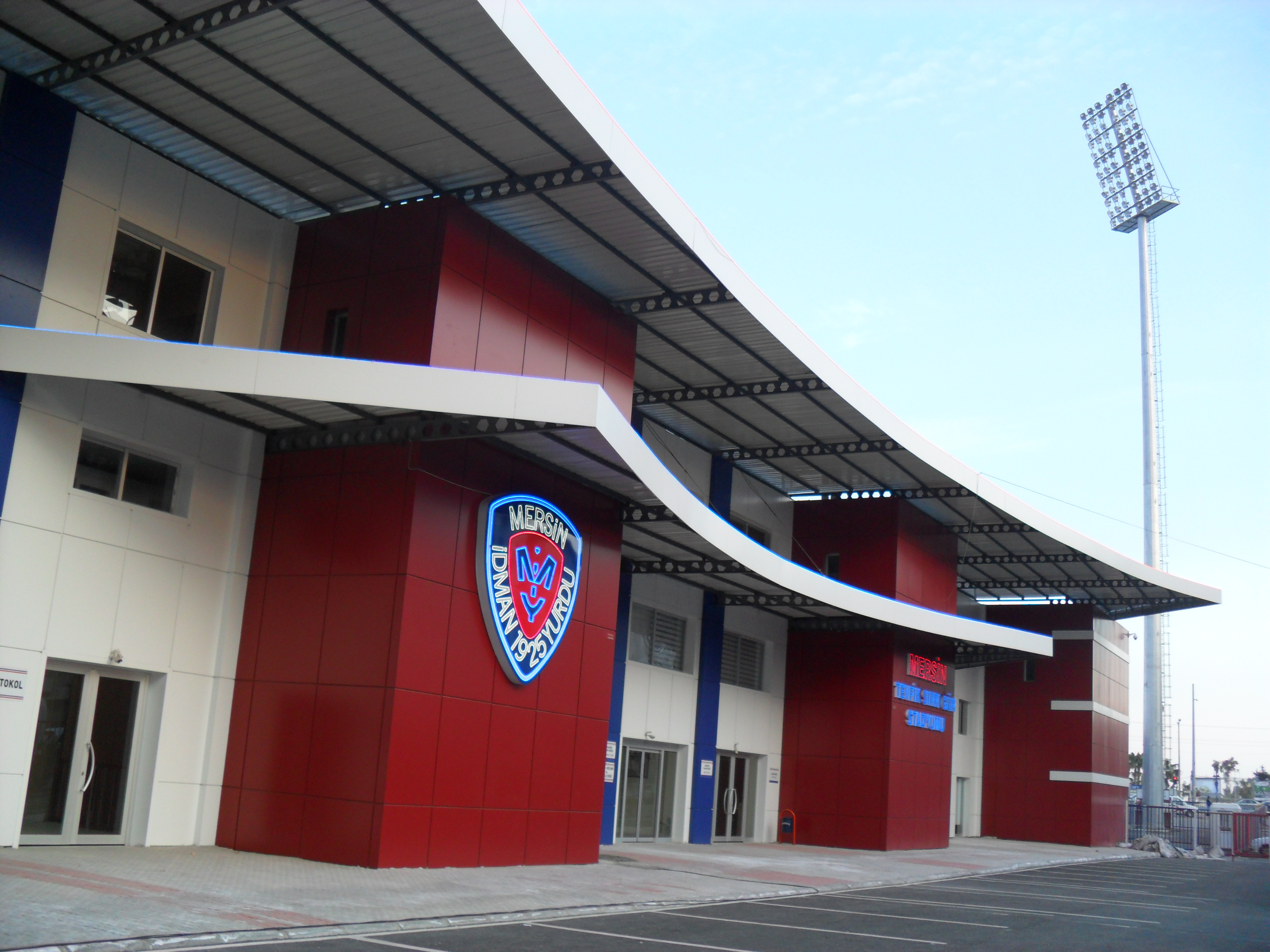
Tevfik Sırrı Gür Stadium

Mersin İdman Yurdu is one of the oldest clubs of the Mediterranean region. The club was founded on 16 August 1925 as Mersin Gençlerbirliği (English: Mersin Youth Union) during a meeting between Edip Buran and his friends İbrahim Yekta, Fevzi Serdengeçti, Asım Güler, Muhip Batıbeki, Necati Salim, Lütfi Resimci, Sami İstanbullu, Hayri Güntekin, Hakkı Cemal Üçer, Hasan Tahsin, and Mustafa Lütfi. Their aim was to provide Mersin's youth with activities to fill their spare time with sports during long, hot summer days in Mersin. Later, the club obtained a license with the participation of other founders, namely İbrahim Bigam, İhsan Dağıstan, Hamit Abey, Rauf Süleymaniyeli, Semih Can, Ömer, Cevdet Türkmenli, Kazım Kırzade, and Muharrem Yeğin.

The first colors of the team were red and white. The club changed its name to Mersin İdman Yurdu in 1926, and their colors were changed to red and dark blue. The logo was established as three connected circles, the center circle in red and the left and right circles in dark blue.

Mersin İdman Yurdu had won the regional title every year since its foundation until 1964, except during the 1949–50 season when Mersin Demirspor captured the title. In 1944, the team reached the third place in the Turkish Football Championship. In 1952, the club inaugurated their new stadium, Tevfik Sırrı Gür Stadyumu, by playing an opening match that was tied 3–3 with Galatasaray.

In 1957, the club became sponsored by the Çukurova Group and adopted the name Çukurova İdmanyurdu. The team again finished third in the Turkish Amateur Championship. Çukurova İdmanyurdu, as "a rather well-known amateur club from the city of Mersin", turned professional and was promoted to Turkey's first second level league founded in 1963. Çukurova İdmanyurdu again became the amateur champions of Turkey in 1963. When they became a part of the Turkish second division they were one of only three clubs that came from outside of the major cities of Istanbul, Ankara, and İzmir, the other clubs being Adana Demirspor and Bursaspor.

In June 1966, the club changed its name to Mersin İdman Yurdu after three seasons and became champions of the Turkish second division in the 1966–67 season. At the end of that season they won the Prime Minister's Cup by defeating the Amateur League champions. Beginning in the 1967–68 season they played in the Turkish top level division (Süper Lig) for 7 consecutive years and 11 years in total. The same season on 6 April 1968, Pakistani internationals Maula Bakhsh and Abdul Jabbar became the team's first foreign transfers.

After the 1982–83 season, MİY was relegated from the Süper Lig. They played in the second division until the formation of a one-group second level division in 2001–02. Because of their place in the 2000–01 season they were automatically relegated to third level formed under the name of "Second League, Category B". They spent one season there and were promoted to the second division (Second League, Category A). After the 2005–06 season, they were relegated to the third division again.

In 2008, Ali Kahramanlı was elected president of the club. They finished the 2008–09 season in the TFF Second League playoffs in second place and advanced to the second division, now with the name TFF First League, also known as Bank Asya 1. Lig. After spending two seasons in the TFF First League, MİY became the champions of 2010–11 Bank Asya 1. Lig and were promoted to 2011–12 Süper Lig after being absent from the Süper Lig for 28 years. Their championship was widely attributed to coach Nurullah Sağlam, who took over the team after the 9th week during that season. They finished Süper Lig as 12th in the 2011–12 season but relegated again to First League after finishing 18th or last in the 2012–13 season. MİY finished the First League as 6th and qualified for the promotion play-offs in the 2013–14 season. They beat Orduspor 3–0 on aggregate and 2–0 Samsunspor and returned to top level at the first attempt. MİY finished the 2014-15 season as seventh. However, next season was a disaster for MİY due to financial problems. Eventually MİY relegated to second level after a 2-0 defeat to Çaykur Rizespor on 29 April 2016.

After the city of Mersin hosted the 2013 Mediterranean Games, there was an urgent need to build a modern stadium in the city. After the games were over, the club started to use the stadium for their league games. The stadium has a capacity of 25,534 people and it is one of the most modern stadiums in Turkey.

== Honours ==
=== Domestic competitions ===
- Turkish Football Championship
  - Third place (1): 1944
- Prime Minister's Cup
  - Winners (1): 1967
- Turkish Cup
  - Runners-up (1): 1982–83
- Turkish Amateur Football Championship
  - Winners (1): 1963

=== Regional competitions ===
- Adana Professional Football League
  - Winners (1): 1959–60
- Adana Football League
  - Winners (4): 1926, 1927, 1931, 1933

=== Others ===
- 1969 Friendship Cup
  - Third place (1): 1969 (Represented Turkey in a friendly tournament, and played four matches against Pakistan, Spartak Moscow, Iran, and Iraq in a one-leg league system; finished third with 2 wins and 2 losses. See MİY 1968–69 for details)

== League participations ==
Before 2001

- First Level: First League: 1967–68, 1968–69, 1969–70, 1970–71, 1971–72, 1972–73, 1973–74, 1976–77, 1977–78, 1980–81, 1982–83.
- Second Level: Second League: 1963–64, 1964–65, 1965–66, 1966–67, 1974–75, 1975–76, 1978–79, 1979–80, 1981–82, 1983–84, 1984–85, 1985–86, 1986–87, 1987–88, 1988–89, 1989–90, 1990–91, 1991–92, 1992–93, 1993–94, 1994–95, 1995–96, 1996–97, 1997–98, 1998–99, 1999–00, 2000–01.

After 2001

- First Level: Süper Lig: 2011–12, 2012–13, 2014–15, 2015–16
- Second Level: Lig A/TFF First League: 2002–03, 2003–04, 2004–05, 2005–06, 2009–10, 2010–11, 2013–14, 2016–17.
- Third Level: Lig B/TFF Second League: 2001–02, 2006–07, 2007–08, 2008–09.

=== All time league table ===
Period	League	Season	Pl	W	D	L	F	A	Av	Pt
Before 2001
Before 2001	Turkish First Football League	11	336	102	104	130	295	339	−44	306
Before 2001	Turkish Second Football League	27	858	381	218	261	1152	863	279	1175
After 2001
After 2001	Süper Lig	1	34	12	6	16	34	45	42	
After 2001	TFF First League	6	168	59	39	70	208	231	−23	216
After 2001	TFF Second League	4	142	66	40	36	190	137	53	238
All times
All times	First division	12	370	114	110	146	329	384	−55	348
All times	Second division	33	1026	440	257	331	1360	1094	256	1391
All times	Third division	4	142	66	40	36	190	137	53	238
All times	Overall Totals	49	1470	591	394	489	1806	1541	253	1879

Note: 2011–12 stats are not included. Play-off games are not included. Before 1987 two-points-for-a-win rule was accepted.

=== Seasonal league table ===
Mersin İdman Yurdu professional league participations by season.

First stage											Second stage									
Season	League	Place	P	W	D	L	F	A	Av	P	Group	Place	P	W	D	L	F	A	Av	P
1963–64	2nd League*	5	24	10	5	9	29	31	−2	25										
1964–65	2nd League*	3	30	18	4	8	42	24	18	40										
1965–66	2nd League Red Group*	2	20	9	7	4	26	13	13	25	Final Group	5	14	6	3	5	21	16	5	15
1966–67	2nd League Red Group	1	32	22	6	4	62	21	41	50										
1967–68	1st League	10	30	12	6	14	42	44	−4	30										
1968–69	1st League	6	30	11	9	10	35	29	6	31										
1969–70	1st League	4	30	12	12	6	32	27	5	36										
1970–71	1st League	11	30	11	6	13	27	26	1	28										
1971–72	1st League	7	30	10	10	10	35	29	6	30										
1972–73	1st League	11	30	8	11	11	26	31	−5	27										
1973–74	1st League	15	30	8	6	16	15	27	−12	22										
1974–75	2nd League Red Group	3	30	14	6	10	36	23	13	34										
1975–76	2nd League Red Group	1	30	14	11	5	39	17	22	39										
1976–77	1st League	7	30	9	13	8	25	26	−1	31										
1977–78	1st League	16	30	3	15	12	18	34	−16	21										
1978–79	2nd League Red Group	6	30	9	12	9	28	26	2	30										
1979–80	2nd League Group A	1	30	17	7	6	38	20	18	41										
1980–81	1st League	15	30	8	7	15	21	34	−13	23										
1981–82	2nd League Group C	1	28	21	5	2	46	11	35	47										
1982–83	1st League	15	34	10	9	15	19	32	−13	29										
1983–84	2nd League Group B	2	32	19	8	5	53	25	28	46										
1984–85	2nd League Group B	8	30	10	8	12	34	38	−4	28										
1985–86	2nd League Group C	12	34	8	16	10	21	28	−7	32										
1986–87	2nd League Group B	11	32	9	14	11	27	32	−5	32										
1987–88	2nd League Group B	11	32	11	8	13	42	37	5	41										
1988–89	2nd League Group B	6	34	14	7	13	48	44	4	49										
1989–90	2nd League Group C	3	32	16	4	12	43	37	6	52										
1990–91	2nd League Group C	3	32	19	7	6	69	36	33	64										
1991–92	2nd League Group C	10	32	12	6	14	44	39	5	42										
1992–93	2nd League Group 2	2	18	12	3	3	44	20	24	39	Promotion Group	5	18	8	3	7	25	21	4	27
1993–94	2nd League Group 3	8	18	3	8	7	19	26	−7	17	Classification Group 3	5	32	9	14	9	37	34	3	41
1994–95	2nd League Group 3	9	18	6	–	12	13	23	−10	18	Classification Group 3	6	32	11	6	15	29	37	−8	39
1995–96	2nd League Group 3	1	18	12	4	2	31	17	14	40	Promotion Group	8	18	5	3	10	15	23	−8	18
1996–97	2nd League Group 3	2	18	10	5	3	26	13	13	35	Promotion Group	4	18	9	2	7	19	14	5	29
1997–98	2nd League Group 1	6	18	4	8	6	26	26	–	20	Classification Group 1	6	32	9	11	12	44	43	1	38
1998–99	2nd League Group 1	3	18	11	–	7	31	21	10	33	Classification Group 1	1	32	17	3	12	53	40	3	54
1999–00	2nd League Group 1	7	18	6	7	5	20	16	4	25	Classification Group 1	5	32	13	10	9	42	27	15	49
2000–01	2nd League Group 1	7	18	6	4	8	23	32	−9	22	Classification Group 1	7	32	8	10	14	39	56	−17	34
2001–02	TFF 2nd League Group 1	1	18	10	5	3	34	19	15	35	Promotion Group	2	18	9	5	4	17	12	5	32
2002–03	TFF 1st League	12	34	12	6	16	52	51	1	42										
2003–04	TFF 1st League	15	34	9	7	18	38	44	−6	34										
2004–05	TFF 1st League	7	34	15	8	11	49	53	−4	53										
2005–06	TFF 1st League	16	34	6	11	17	30	54	−24	29										
2006–07	TFF 2nd League Group 2	3	18	9	2	7	26	25	1	29	Classification Group 2	3	32	11	10	11	41	45	−4	43
2007–08	TFF 2nd League Group 2	2	18	12	3	3	24	11	13	39	Promotion Group	6	18	6	5	7	18	19	−1	23
2008–09	TFF 2nd League Group 3	2	20	9	8	3	30	17	13	35	Promotion Group	2	18	9	4	5	26	14	12	31
2009–10	TFF 1st League	13	34	11	8	15	36	44	−8	41										
2010–11	TFF 1st League	1	32	17	7	8	39	29	10	58										
2011–12	Süper Lig																			

Note: Classification group statistics are accumulated on normal season.
Note (*): The team played as "Çukurova İdmanyurdu".
League and group colors: Green: Promoted; Light green: Qualified; Pink: Relegated.

=== Play-off games ===
- 2013–14 – Turkish First League championship game: Mersin İdman Yurdu 2–0 Samsunspor
- 1998–99 – Turkish Second League play-offs quarter-finals: Çaykur Rizespor 2–0 Mersin İdman Yurdu
- 1996–97 – Turkish Second League play-offs quarter-finals: Kartalspor 2–0 Mersin İdman Yurdu
- 1979–80 – Turkish Second League championship game: Kocaelispor 2–2 (pen: 4–2) Mersin İdman Yurdu
- 1975–76 – Turkish Second League championship game: Samsunspor 3–1 Mersin İdman Yurdu
- 1966–67 – Turkish Second League championship game: Mersin İdman Yurdu 2–0 Bursaspor

== Turkish Cup participations ==
Participated in the Turkish Cup since 1962.

- Runners-up: 1982–83
- Eliminated at quarter-finals: 1980–81
- Eliminated at Sixth Round: 1981–82
- Eliminated at fourth round: 1975–76, 1976–77, 1978–79, 1983–84, 1997–98
- Eliminated at third round: 1963–64, 1964–65, 1966–67, 1977–78, 1979–80, 1991–92, 1994–95, 1995–96, 1996–97, 2005–06 (group stage), 2009–10, 2010–11
- Eliminated at second round: 1962–63, 1967–68, 1969–70, 1970–71, 1972–73, 1989–90, 1990–91, 1993–94, 1998–99, 1999–00, 2003–04, 2004–05
- Eliminated at first round: 1968–69, 1984–85, 1985–86, 1986–87, 1992–93, 2002–03, 2006–07

=== All-time competition statistics ===
Period	League attended	Season	Pl	W	D	L	F	A	Av	Pt
Before 2001
Before 2001	Turkish First Football League	9	42	18	10	14	53	40	13	46
Before 2001	Turkish Second Football League	22	58	28	7	23	96	72	24	72
Before 2001	Turkish Amateur Football Championship	1	3	2	0	1	3	3	0	4
After 2001
After 2001	Süper Lig	1								
After 2001	TFF First League	6	16	7	0	9	31	38	−7	21
After 2001	TFF Second League	1	1	0	0	1	0	2	−2	0
All-time
All-time	First division	10	42	18	10	14	53	40	13	46
All-time	Second division	28	74	35	7	32	127	110	17	93
All-time	Third division	1	1	0	0	1	0	2	−2	0
All-time	Amateur division	1	3	2	0	1	3	3	0	4
All-time	Overall	40	120	55	17	48	183	155	28	143

Note: 2011–12 stats are not included. Before 1987 two-points-for-a-win rule was accepted. Serial penalties included in the match scores.

=== Seasonal competition statistics ===
Season	Competition	League attended	Rounds played	Pl	W	D	L	F	A	Pt
1962–63	Türkiye Kupası	Turkish Amateur Football Championship	R1 Preliminary, R1, R2	3	2	0	1	3	3	4
1963–64	Türkiye Kupası	Turkish Second Football League	R3 Preliminary, R3	2	1	0	1	2	2	2
1964–65	Türkiye Kupası	Turkish Second Football League	R2 P, R2, R3 P2	3	2	0	1	6	5	4
1966–67	Türkiye Kupası	Turkish Second Football League	R2 P2, R2, R3 P2	3	2	0	1	7	4	4
1967–68	Türkiye Kupası	Turkish First Football League	R1, R2	4	2	1	1	5	2	5
1968–69	Türkiye Kupası	Turkish First Football League	R1	2	0	0	2	1	4	0
1969–70	Türkiye Kupası	Turkish First Football League	R1, R2 P, R2	6	3	1	2	16	5	7
1970–71	Türkiye Kupası	Turkish First Football League	R1, R2	4	1	2	1	3	3	4
1972–73	Türkiye Kupası	Turkish First Football League	R1, R2	4	1	2	1	3	3	4
1975–76	Türkiye Kupası	Turkish Second Football League	R2 S1, R2 S2, R3, R4	6	3	1	2	10	6	7
1976–77	Türkiye Kupası	Turkish First Football League	R3, R4	4	3	0	1	9	6	6
1977–78	Türkiye Kupası	Turkish First Football League	R3	2	1	0	1	2	3	2
1978–79	Türkiye Kupası	Turkish Second Football League	R3, R4	2	1	0	1	1	1	2
1979–80	Türkiye Kupası	Turkish Second Football League	R3	1	0	0	1	2	4	0
1980–81	Türkiye Kupası	Turkish First Football League	R5, R6 QF	6	2	1	3	4	6	5
1981–82	Türkiye Kupası	Turkish Second Football League	R2, R3, R4, R5, R6	10	5	3	2	13	6	13
1982–83	Federasyon Kupası	Turkish First Football League	R5, R6, QF, SF, F	10	5	3	2	10	8	13
1983–84	Federasyon Kupası	Turkish Second Football League	R2, R3, R4	6	5	0	1	13	3	10
1984–85	Federasyon Kupası	Turkish Second Football League	R1	2	0	2	0	1	1	2
1985–86	Federasyon Kupası	Turkish Second Football League	R1	2	0	1	1	0	2	1
1986–87	Federasyon Kupası	Turkish Second Football League	R1	1	0	0	1	1	2	0
1989–90	Federasyon Kupası	Turkish Second Football League	R2	1	0	0	1	0	1	0
1990–91	Federasyon Kupası	Turkish Second Football League	R1, R2	2	1	0	1	8	3	3
1991–92	Federasyon Kupası	Turkish Second Football League	R2, R3	2	1	0	1	3	3	3
1992–93	Türkiye Kupası	Turkish Second Football League	R1	1	0	0	1	3	4	0
1993–94	Türkiye Kupası	Turkish Second Football League	R1, R2	2	1	0	1	4	3	3
1994–95	Türkiye Kupası	Turkish Second Football League	R2, R3	2	1	0	1	2	2	3
1995–96	Türkiye Kupası	Turkish Second Football League	R2, R3	2	1	0	1	4	3	3
1996–97	Türkiye Kupası	Turkish Second Football League	R2, R3	2	1	0	1	7	7	3
1997–98	Türkiye Kupası	Turkish Second Football League	R2, R3, R4	3	2	0	1	3	3	6
1998–99	Türkiye Kupası	Turkish Second Football League	R2	1	0	0	1	3	4	0
1999–00	Türkiye Kupası	Turkish Second Football League	R1, R2	2	1	0	1	3	3	3
2002–03	Türkiye Kupası	TFF First League	R1	1	0	0	1	1	2	0
2003–04	Türkiye Kupası	TFF First League	R1, R2	2	1	0	1	1	2	3
2004–05	Türkiye Kupası	TFF First League	R1, R2	2	1	0	1	4	4	3
2005–06	Fortis Türkiye Kupası	TFF First League	R1, R2, R3 (group stage)	6	2	0	4	8	13	6
2006–07	Fortis Türkiye Kupası	TFF Second League	R1	1	0	0	1	0	2	0
2009–10	Ziraat Türkiye Kupası	TFF First League	R1, R2, R3 (play-off)	3	2	0	1	14	12	6
2010–11	Ziraat Türkiye Kupası	TFF First League	R2, R3 (play-offs)	2	1	0	1	3	5	3
2011–12	Ziraat Türkiye Kupası	TFF First League	R3 (play-offs)							

Note: Serial penalties added to match scores. Before 1987, two points for a win rule accepted.

== European participations ==
As of 28 September 1983

Competition	Pld	W	D	L	GF	GA	GD
UEFA Cup Winners' Cup	2	0	1	1	0	1	–1

UEFA Cup Winners' Cup:

Season	Round	Club	Home	Away	Aggregate
1983–84	1R	(Bulgaria) Spartak Varna	0–0	0–1	0–1

UEFA Ranking history:

As of 1988

Season	Rank	Points	Ref.
1984	199 ▲	0.500	
1985	210 ▼	0.500	
1986	207 ▲	0.500	
1987	204 ▲	0.500	
1988	206 ▼	0.500	

== Current squad ==
As of 1 September 2016

Note: Flags indicate national team as defined under FIFA eligibility rules; some limited exceptions apply. Players may hold more than one non-FIFA nationality.

No.	Pos.	Nation	Player
2	DF	TUR	Ahmet Taner Cukadar
4	DF	TUR	Mehmet Sığırcı
5	MF	TUR	Tekin Oğrak
6	DF	TUR	Serol Demirhan
7	MF	TUR	Mahmut Metin
10	MF	TUR	Tolga Sahin
11	FW	TUR	Ahmet Bener
17	MF	TUR	Emre Can Dönmez
19	DF	TUR	Abdulkadir Korkut

No.	Pos.	Nation	Player
23	GK	TUR	Hasan Daş
25	GK	TUR	Furkan Güzel
32	DF	TUR	Mesut Aggül
33	MF	TUR	Nurullah Kaya
46	FW	TUR	Mehmet Ali Kacar
66	DF	TUR	Gökhan Akkan
77	FW	TUR	Güven Varol
81	FW	TUR	Sinan Kaloğlu
99	MF	TUR	Furkan Aydemir

== Presidents ==
- Current President: Mahmut Karak since 25 February 2017.

Former presidents

President	Period
(Turkey) Reşit Galip Bey
(Turkey) Hakkı Cemal Üçer
(Turkey) Edip Buran
(Turkey) Halil Zaloğlu
(Turkey) Muharrem Hilmi Yeğin
(Turkey) Sait Arif Akıncı
(Turkey) Enver Ali Gernaz
(Turkey) Fuat Morel
(Turkey) Rıza Kurtuluş
(Turkey) Mitat Toroğlu	1930–1940
(Turkey) Fahri Merzeci
(Turkey) Tarık Özergin
(Turkey) Muhittin Aynaz
(Turkey) Anvi Gürsel
(Turkey) Şadi Eliyeşil

President	Period
(Turkey) Mehmet Karamehmet
(Turkey) Sadık Eliyeşil
(Turkey) Mehmet Karamehmet	1963–1965
(Turkey) Halit Gazioğlu	1965–1966
(Turkey) Nevzat Emrealp	1966–1967
(Turkey) Faruk Miskavi	1967–1968
(Turkey) Mehmet Karamehmet	1968–1974
(Turkey) Kaya Mutlu	1974–1976
(Turkey) Burhan Kanun	1976–1977
(Turkey) Salih Turhan Lokmanoğlu	1977–1978
(Turkey) Atilla Perşembe	1978–1979
(Turkey) Hadi Doğan	1979–1980
(Turkey) Aslan Çevirgen	1980–1981
(Turkey) Mehmet Fatih Deveci	1981–1983
(Turkey) Haluk Ulusoy	1983–1987

President	Period
(Turkey) H. Okan Merzeci	1987–26.03.1989
(Turkey) Kaya Mutlu	27.03.1989–26.03.1994
(Turkey) H. Okan Merzeci	27.03.1994–20.10.1997
(Turkey) Mehmet Küver	21.10.1997–18.04.1999
(Turkey) Macit Özcan	19.04.1999–22.05.2004
(Turkey) Hasan Ahi	24.05.2004–15.01.2006
(Turkey) Erol Ertan	16.01.2006–08.01.2007
(Turkey) Hamit İzol	09.01.2007–12.12.2007
(Turkey) Hüseyin Çalışkan	13.12.2007–23.09.2008
(Turkey) Ali Kahramanlı	24.09.2008–11.01.2016
(Turkey) Hüseyin Çalışkan	11.01.2016–27.09.2016
(Turkey) Ali Tekin	28.09.2016–25.02.2017
(Turkey) Mahmut Karak	25.02.2017–present

Sources: Club history

== Coaches ==
- Head coach: (Turkey) Levent Eriş since 3 March 2017.

Former coaches

Head coach	Period
(Turkey) İlhan Taşucu	01.08.1963–31.05.1965
(Turkey) Fahrettin Cansever	01.08.1965–20.01.1966
(Turkey) Lefter Küçükandonyadis	20.01.1966–31.05.1967
(Turkey) Cihat Arman	01.08.1967–28.04.1968
(Turkey) Turgay Şeren	15.06.1968–25.03.1969
(Turkey) Bülent Giz	27.08.1969–31.05.1971
(Romania) Dumitru Teodorescu	01.07.1971–29.08.1971
(Turkey) Turgay Şeren	31.08.1971–11.02.1973
(Romania) Ion Motroc	09.09.1973–23.09.1973
(Turkey) Nazım Koka	30.09.1973–10.03.1974
(Socialist Federal Republic of Yugoslavia) Tomislav Kaloperović	23.03.1974–31.05.1974
(Turkey) Bülent Giz	01.08.1974–31.05.1975
(Turkey) Kadri Aytaç	01.08.1975–31.05.1977
(Turkey) Turgut Kafkas	01.08.1977–31.12.1977
(Turkey) Orhan Yüksel	01.01.1978–31.05.1978
(Romania) Octavian Popescu	01.08.1978–31.05.1979
(Turkey) Suat Mamat	01.08.1979–31.05.1980
(Turkey) İsmet Arıkan	02.06.1980–31.05.1981
(Turkey) Candan Dumanlı	01.08.1981–31.05.1982
(Turkey) Gündüz Tekin Onay	01.08.1982–31.05.1983
(Turkey) Kahraman Karataş	01.08.1983–31.05.1985
(Turkey) Aydın Tohumcu	01.08.1985–31.05.1986
(Turkey) Kahraman Karataş	01.08.1986–31.05.1987
(Turkey) Aydın Tohumcu	01.08.1987–31.05.1988
(Turkey) İsmet Arıkan	01.08.1988–31.05.1989

Head coach	Period
(Turkey) Ali Hoşfikirer	01.08.1988–31.05.1989
(Turkey) Aydın Tohumcu	01.08.1989–04.01.1990
(Netherlands) Ger Blok	04.01.1990–31.05.1990
(Turkey) Kadri Aytaç	01.08.1990–31.05.1991
(Turkey) Adnan Dinçer	01.06.1991–31.05.1992
(Turkey) Kadri Aytaç	22.06.1992–20.12.1992
(Turkey) Fevzi Zemzem	24.12.1992–25.04.1993
(Turkey) Nasır Belci	05.05.1993–31.05.1993
(Turkey) Aydın Tohumcu	01.07.1993–25.10.1993
(Turkey) Battal Toktay	01.11.1993–31.05.1994
(Turkey) Kahraman Karataş	09.06.1994–20.10.1994
(Turkey) Levent Arıkdoğan	01.04.1995–28.02.1996
(Turkey) Candan Dumanlı	28.02.1996–31.05.1996
(Turkey) Kasım Gündüz	08.07.1996–31.05.1997
(Turkey) Zafer Bilgetay	03.07.1997–18.09.1997
(Turkey) Kasım Gündüz	30.10.1997–12.02.1998
(Turkey) Zafer Göncüler	12.02.1998–31.07.1998
(Turkey) Müjdat Yalman	01.08.1998–14.12.1999
(Turkey) Kahraman Karataş	11.02.1999–31.05.1999
(Turkey) Ali Gültiken	01.07.1999–09.09.1999
(Turkey) Müjdat Yalman	30.09.1999–13.03.2000
(Turkey) Levent Arıkdoğan	01.07.2000–18.10.2000
(Turkey) Nasır Belci	06.07.2001–27.01.2003
(Turkey) Yücel İldiz	30.01.2003–19.09.2003
(Turkey) Mehmet Şahan	19.09.2003–28.12.2003

Head coach	Period
(Turkey) Levent Eriş	22.01.2004–31.05.2004
(Turkey) Levent Arıkdoğan	26.08.2004–01.11.2005
(Turkey) Engin Korukır	18.11.2005–17.03.2006
(Turkey) Nasır Belci	17.03.2006–26.09.2006
(Turkey) İlyas Tüfekçi	02.10.2006–08.03.2007
(Turkey) Kahraman Karataş	13.03.2007–31.05.2007
(Turkey) Abdülkerim Durmaz	17.07.2007–31.05.2008
(Turkey) Ercan Albay	14.08.2008–31.05.2009
(Turkey) Serhat Güller	19.08.2009–31.01.2010
(Turkey) Ergün Penbe	05.02.2010–31.05.2010
(Turkey) Yüksel Yeşilova	03.06.2010–17.10.2010
(Turkey) Nurullah Sağlam	22.10.2010–18.12.2012
(Turkey) Giray Bulak	20.12.2012–06.03.2013
(Turkey) Hakan Kutlu	08.03.2013–06.03.2014
(Turkey) Yılmaz Vural	06.03.2014–16.05.2014
(Turkey) Hakan Kutlu	16.05.2013–31.05.2014
(Turkey) Rıza Çalımbay	03.06.2014–31.05.2015
(Turkey) Mesut Bakkal	03.07.2015–18.09.2015
(Turkey) Bülent Korkmaz	22.09.2015–04.01.2016
(Turkey) Ümit Özat	19.01.2016–06.05.2016
(Turkey) Levent Arıkdoğan	21.07.2016–28.10.2016
(Turkey) Yusuf Şimşek	28.10.2016–19.01.2017
(Turkey) Memduh Özbalta	09.02.2017–02.03.2017
(Turkey) Levent Eriş	03.03.2017–present

Note: Start dates of coaches who started regularly have been shown as 1 August, before 1990, if there was no TFF records.

== See also ==
- Football in Turkey
