= Osman Arpacıoğlu =

Turkish footballer (1947–2021)

Personal information
- Full name: Osman Arpacıoğlu
- Date of birth: 5 January 1947
- Place of birth: Ankara, Turkey
- Date of death: 5 December 2021 (aged 74)
- Position: Forward

Youth career
- 1965: Hacettepespor

Senior career*
Years	Team	Apps	(Gls)
1966–1971	Mersin İdman Yurdu	139	(75)
1971–1977	Fenerbahçe	136	(60)
1977–1979	Balıkesirspor		
Total		275	(135)

International career
1968–1974	Turkey	13	(3)
- * Club domestic league appearances and goals

Osman Arpacıoğlu (5 January 1947 – 5 December 2021) was a Turkish professional footballer. He has played as forward position. He started his professional career with Hacettepespor and he also played for Mersin İdman Yurdu, Fenerbahçe and Balıkesirspor.

In 1972–73 season, he was the top scorer of the league.

He scored 200th goal of Turkey against Algeria on 14 February 1973.

He finished his career on 9 June 1980 with Balıkesirspor-Fenerbahçe match.

== Awards ==
- Turkish League (2): 1973–74, 1974–75
- Turkish Cup (1): 1974
- Presidents Cup (2): 1973, 1975
- Chancellor Cup (1): 1973
- TSYD Cup (3): 1974, 1976, 1977
- League Top Scorer (1): 1972-73
