= Octavian Popescu (footballer, born 1938) =

Romanian footballer and coach

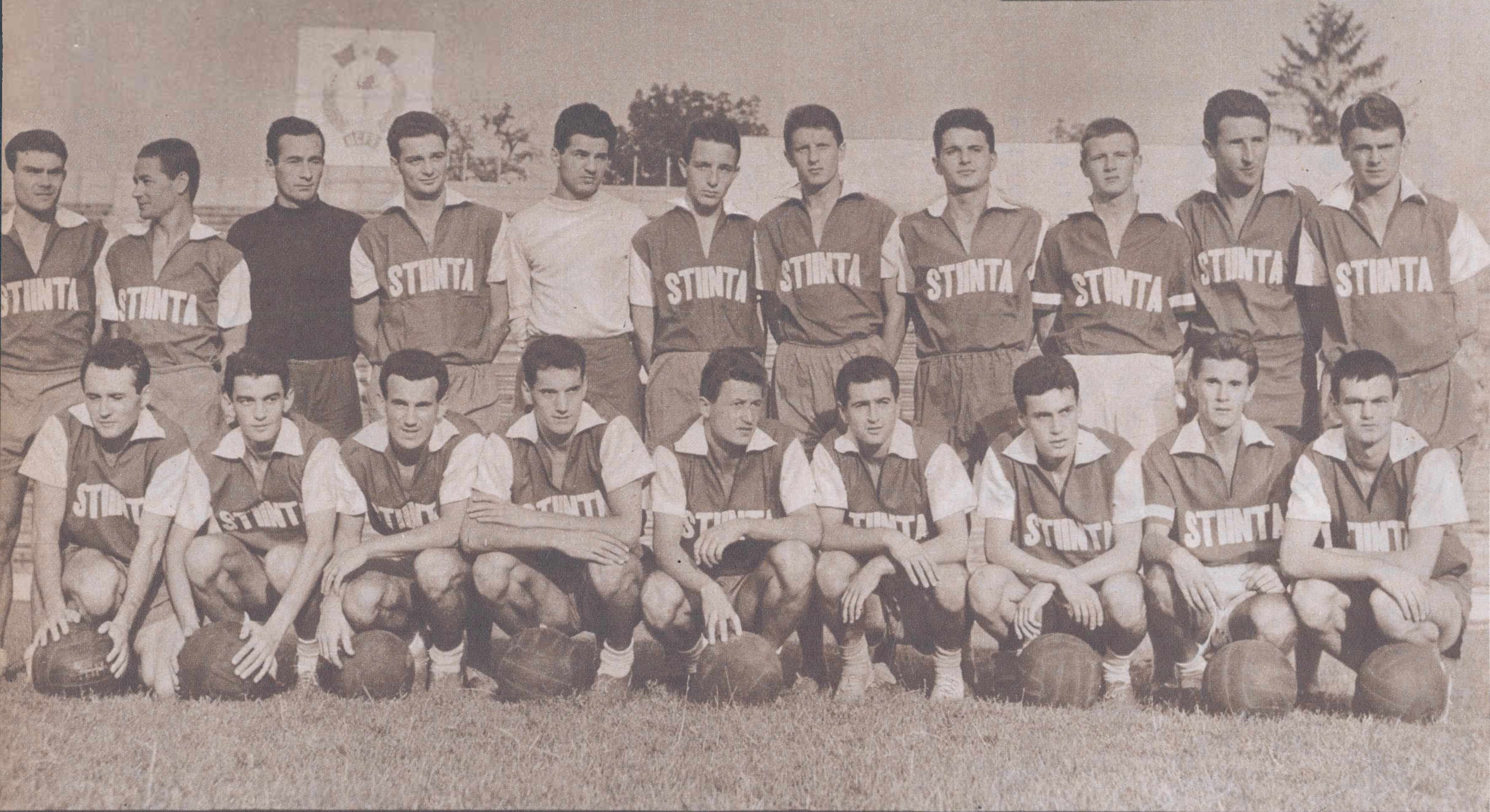
- Popescu (standing, second from left) with Ştiinţa Cluj

Personal information
- Date of birth: 25 April 1938 (age 88)
- Place of birth: Bucharest, Romania
- Height: 1.67 m (5 ft 6 in)
- Position: Midfielder

Youth career
- 1948–1959: Rapid București

Senior career*
Years	Team	Apps	(Gls)
1959–1960	Rapid București	7	(0)
1960–1963	Ştiinţa Cluj	85	(14)
1963–1967	Dinamo București	70	(15)
1967–1968	Jiul Petroşani	22	(4)
1968–1969	Rapid București	8	(3)
1969–1971	Mersin İdmanyurdu	30	(4)
Total		222	(40)

International career
1964	Romania	1	(1)

Managerial career
- 1972–1973: Dunărea Giurgiu
- 1973–1974: Progresul Brăila
- 1974–1975: Eskişehirspor
- 1975–1978: Romania Olympic
- 1978–1979: Mersin İdmanyurdu
- 1980–1984: 1860 München II
- 1984: 1860 München
- 1986: Malatyaspor
- 1991: Offenburger FV
- * Club domestic league appearances and goals

Octavian Popescu (born 25 April 1938) is a Romanian former footballer and coach known in Germany and Turkey as Popi or Pope.

Popescu acquired his coaching license at the German Sport University of Cologne and also worked as a coach instructor for the DFB Academy in Germany. He is one of the founders of the IFTA International Footballtennis Association.

== Career ==
Born in Bucharest, Popescu started playing football for FC Rapid București. He joined Ştiinţa Cluj before moving to FC Dinamo București, where he won the league title twice with the club. He also played for CS Jiul Petroşani before returning to FC Rapid București in 1968.

Popescu next moved to Turkey to join Mersin İdmanyurdu SK. He made 30 appearances in the Süper Lig during the 1969–70 and 1970–71 seasons.

He made one appearance for Romania in which he scored in a friendly 2–1 win against Yugoslavia in 1964.

Following the end of his playing career, Popescu managed several clubs in Romania and Turkey including Eskişehirspor, and the Romania Olympic team before he moved to West Germany, where he studied at the Sports Academy of Cologne which is now called the Hennes Weisweiler Academy. He was appointed manager of TSV 1860 München, Malatyaspor, and Offenburger FV in 1991.

In 2014, Popescu was among the candidates for the Romanian FA presidency.

== Honours ==
=== Player ===
Dinamo București

- Divizia A (2): 1963–64, 1964–65
- Cupa României: 1963–64
