= Fethi Heper =

Turkish footballer (1944–2025)

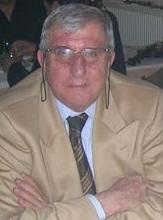
- Heper in 2014

Personal information
- Date of birth: 3 February 1944
- Place of birth: Eskişehir, Turkey
- Date of death: 13 February 2025 (aged 81)
- Place of death: Odunpazarı, Turkey
- Position: Forward

Youth career
- 1960–1965: Eskişehir Gençlik Kulübü

Senior career*
Years	Team	Apps	(Gls)
1965–1974	Eskişehirspor	249	(104)

International career
1968–1971	Turkey	3	(0)
- * Club domestic league appearances and goals

Fethi Heper (3 February 1944 – 13 February 2025) was a Turkish professional footballer who played as a forward. He was the top goal scorer of Eskişehirspor. Following retirement, he became a university finance professor.

== Biography ==
Heper scored many goals during his career, and was the leading scorer in the Süper Lig during the 1969–70 and 1971–72 seasons. He made three appearances for the Turkey national team.

After his football career, he became a lecturer. He was also a finance professor at Anadolu University.

He graduated for his licence Faculty of Economic and Administrative Sciences in Eskişehir in 1967. Afterwards, he finished his doctor's degree in 1978.

Heper died in Odunpazarı on 13 February 2025, at the age of 81.
