= Tevfik Sırrı Gür Stadium =

Sports stadium located in Turkey

Coordinates: 36°47′11″N 34°37′03″E

Tevfik Sırrı Gür Stadyumu
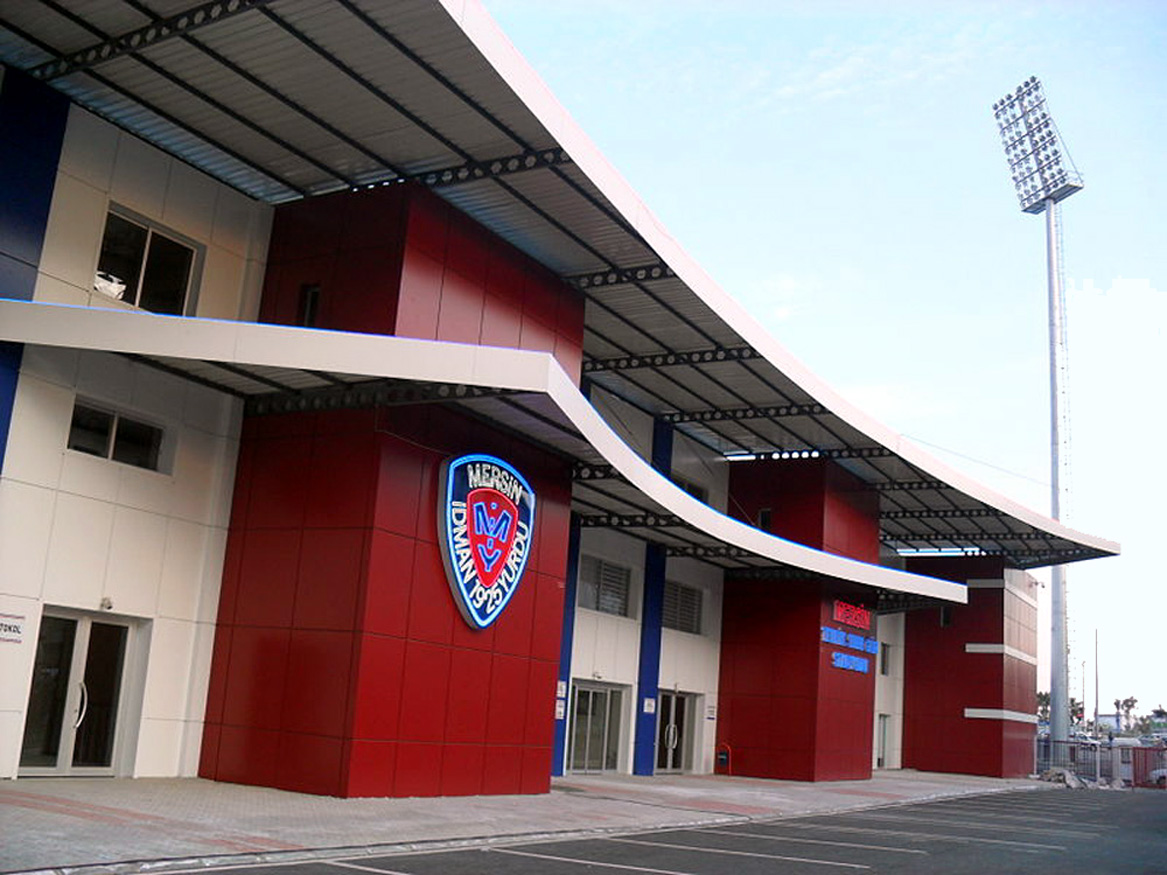
- Interactive map of Tevfik Sırrı Gür Stadyumu
- Location: Mersin
- Capacity: 10,128
- Surface: Grass
- Field size: 105 × 68 m

Construction
- Opened: 1958
- Demolished: 2018

Tenant
- Mersin İdmanyurdu (1958–2014)

Tevfik Sırrı Gür Stadium (Turkish: Tevfik Sırrı Gür Stadyumu) was a sports center in Mersin, located at Mediterranean coast of Turkey. It is the former home of Mersin İdmanyurdu. The stadium was named after former popular governor of Mersin Province, Tevfik Sırrı Gür, who served between 1931 and 1947.

== History ==
The stadium was inaugurated on 28 June 1958. In the opening game, Mersin İdmanyurdu drawn 3–3 with Galatasaray. In the first top-level league match played in the stadium Mersin İdmanyurdu lost to Galatasaray by 1–2 on 10 September 1967, Sunday.

== TFF information ==
Information on Turkish Football Federation (TFF) page is as below:

General information

- City: Mersin
- Capacity: 10,128
- Information:

Pitch

- Pitch size: 68 × 105
- Surface type: Grass
- Lighting: Available

Stands

- Seats:
- Handicapped stand: Not available
- Closed circuit camera system: Available

== Last match ==
The last match played in the stadium was between Mersin İdmanyurdy SK and Adana Demirspor on 10 March 2014.
