= Türk Telekom GSK =

Türk Telekom G.S.K.
- Full name: Türk Telekom Gençlik ve Spor Kulubü
- Founded: 1954
- Ground: Ankara Türk Telekom Stadı
- Capacity: 2,000
- Chairman: Celahattin Dinçer
- Manager: Adnan Şentürk
- League: TFF Second League
- 2007–08: 3rd classification group
Home colours	Away colours

Active departments of Türk Telekom
Football	Basketball	Volleyball

Türk Telekom GSK is a sports club located in Ankara, Turkey. The club is commonly referred to as Türk Telekomspor. The football team played their home games in Ankara Türk Telekom Stadı in Ankara. The club was founded in 1954 as Telspor and its previous name was PTT, and its colors were yellow and black. PTT had played in the First Level. It also has a basketball team, Türk Telekom B.K., which plays in the Turkish Basketball League. Türk Telekomspor played Turkish Basketball League between 1966–1973 and 1991–1996 as PTT. They changed their name to the currently existing one in 1996. Their football division ceased to exist with the end of the 2010–11 season.

== European participations ==
As of 27 August 1969

Statistics:

Competition	Pld	W	D	L	GF	GA	GD
Balkans Cup	4	1	1	2	8	8	0

Pld = Matches played; W = Matches won; D = Matches drawn; L = Matches lost; GF = Goals for; GA = Goals against; GD = Goal Difference.

Balkans Cup:

Season	Round	Club	Home	Away	Aggregate
1969	Group Stage (Group B)	(Bulgaria) Beroe Stara Zagora	2–2	0–3	2nd
1969	Group Stage (Group B)	(Greece) Pierikos	4–0	2–3	2nd

== Squad ==
Note: Flags indicate national team as defined under FIFA eligibility rules; some limited exceptions apply. Players may hold more than one non-FIFA nationality.

No.	Pos.	Nation	Player
—	GK	TUR	Ali Yalçın
—	DF	TUR	Alp Küçükvardar
—	DF	TUR	Serdar Sinik
—	MF	TUR	Aykan Öksüz
—	MF	TUR	Habib Kok
—	MF	TUR	Erhan Yıldırım
—	MF	TUR	Hacı Kalın
—	MF	TUR	Erhan Doğan
—	FW	TUR	Serdar Aydın
—	FW	TUR	Mehmet Tosak
—	FW	TUR	Abdul Miraş
—	MF	AZE	Mehraj Bakhshaliyev

No.	Pos.	Nation	Player
—	GK	TUR	Alıyan Güven
—	GK	TUR	Şahid Öksüz
—	GK	TUR	Namaz Aydemir
—	DF	TUR	Aliyağa Halilpur
—	DF	TUR	Nusayı Hanlar
—	DF	TUR	Bürhan Kuçuk
—	DF	TUR	Hüseyin Halilpur
—	DF	AZE	Kamran Ahmadov
—	DF	RUS	Khayal Mustafayev
—	MF	TUR	Çavdan Ala
—	MF	TUR	Orkun Zaba
—	FW	TUR	Haji Polat

== Participations for football team ==
- Turkish Super League: 1960–71, 1972–73
- TFF First League: 1971–72, 1973–74, 1983–94, 1995–98, 2000–01, 2003–07
- TFF Second League: 1974–75, 1994–95, 1998–00, 2001–03, 2007–11 (Football section was closed in 2011)
- Turkish Regional Amateur League: 1975–83
