= 1966–67 Mersin İdmanyurdu season =

Mersin İdmanyurdu
1966–67 season
- President: Nevzat Emrealp
- Coach: (Turkey) Fahrettin Cansever till 20 January 1967 (Turkey) Lefter Küçükandonyadis since 20 January 1967
- Stadium: Tevfik Sırrı Gür Stadium; Mersin, Turkey
- Second League: Red Group: 1st Cup: Champions
- Turkish Cup: Eliminated at R3 P2
- Chancellor Cup: Champions
- Most appearances: (Turkey) Kadri Aytaç (31)
- Top goalscorer: (Turkey) Osman Arpacıoğlu (23)
Home colours	Away colours	Third colours

Mersin İdmanyurdu (also Mersin İdman Yurdu, Mersin İY, or MİY) Sports Club; located in Mersin, east Mediterranean coast of Turkey in 1966-1967. The 1966–67 season was the 3rd season of Mersin İdmanyurdu football team in Second League, the second level division in Turkey. The team became the champions of the league and promoted to 1967-68 Turkish First Football League at the end of the season.

The team's name was changed to Mersin İdmanyurdu from Çukurova İdmanyurdu which was the name adopted under Çukurova Group sponsorship. This decision was made in the congress of the club held on 15.06.1966. In the congress, following were elected for executive committee: Nevzat Emrealp, Mehmet Karamehmet, Halit Gazioğlu, Mahir Turhan, Mustafa Sözmen, Faruk Niskavi, Ünal Şıhman, Erol Tarhan, Sungur Baydur, Sezai Sak, Aydın Özlü. The committee declared that an amount of TL 500.000 was allocated for transfers and Sabri Kiraz was decided to be spoken with as manager of the football team. However, later, Lefter Küçükandonyadis has become the manager, famous former player of Fenerbahçe and Turkey national football team. In the mid-season Küçükandonyadis left his previous team Feriköy and started his manager career in MİY on 16.02.1967. He demanded that existing coach Fahrettin Cansever should also remain as trainer.

Executive committee at the beginning of the season had been consisted of: Nevzat Emrealp (president), Nail Turan (deputy president), Dr. Aydın Özlü (secretary), Sezai Sak (general captain), Sungur Baydur (accountant), Halil Gazioğlu, Ünal Şıhman (members).

Mersin İdmanyurdu has won the league title in Turkish Second Football League, 1966–67 season. They finished the season in Red Group at first place. After season they won Second League Championship match against Bursaspor. As champions they were eligible to play Prime Minister's Cup (Chancellor Cup) against champions of the amateur leagues.

== Pre-season ==
Spor–Toto Cup games:

- 21.08.1966 - Adanaspor-MİY: 3–1. Sunday. Adana.
- 28.08.1966 - Adana Demirspor-MİY: 0–0. Sunday. Adana.
- 04.09.1966 - MİY-Kayserispor: 1–0. Sunday. Adana.

== 1966–67 Second League participation ==
Second League was played for the fourth time in 1966–67 season with 33 teams grouped in red (17) and white (16) groups. In each group top teams promoted to First League 1967–68 and last teams relegated to Third League 1967–68 formed that year. Mersin İY took place in Red Group and finished first. The most scorer player was Osman Arpacıoğlu with 23 goals. They won all the home games during the league.

=== Results summary ===
Mersin İdmanyurdu (MİY) 1966–67 Second League Red Group league summary:

	Overall									Home								Away							
Stage	Pc	Pl	W	D	L	GF	GA	GD	Pt	Pl	W	D	L	GF	GA	GD	Pt	Pl	W	D	L	GF	GA	GD	Pt
First half	2	16	10	4	2	25	14	+11	24	7	7	0	0	16	4	+12	14	9	3	4	2	9	10	-1	10
Second half		16	12	2	2	37	7	+30	26	9	9	0	0	28	1	+27	18	7	3	2	2	9	6	+3	8
Overall	1	32	22	6	4	62	21	+41	50	16	16	0	0	44	5	+39	32	16	6	6	4	18	16	+2	18

Sources: 1966–67 Turkish Second Football League pages.

=== League table ===
The final league table of Red Group of Second League in 1966–67 season and results of games played by Mersin İY are provided in the following table.

Pc	Team	Games				Goals		Pts	Home			Away		
Pc	Team	Pl	W	D	L	F	A	Pts	F–A	R	Pc	F–A	R	Pc
1	Mersin İdmanyurdu (C) (P)	32	22	6	4	62	21	50	–	6	7	–	25	1
2	Beykoz	32	15	9	8	42	31	39	1–0	5	5	1–1	22	1
3	Sarıyer	32	15	7	10	33	24	37	3–0	30	1	2–1	13	5
4	Zonguldakspor	32	12	13	7	37	30	37	2–0	28	1	1–1	11	6
5	Edirnespor	32	14	8	10	28	23	36	3–0	34	1	0–0	17	2
6	Sakaryaspor	32	12	10	10	28	31	34	5–1	18	2	2–2	1	11
7	Denizlispor	32	13	7	12	25	28	33	2–0	3	10	0–0	20	1
8	Bandırmaspor	32	12	8	12	34	24	32	3–0	19	1	0–3	2	14
9	Karagümrük	32	11	10	11	36	37	32	2–1	14	5	2–3	31	1
10	Antalyaspor	32	13	4	15	36	41	30	4–0	26	1	0–1	9	7
11	Manisaspor	32	11	8	13	28	41	30	5–1	16	2	1–2	33	1
12	Adanaspor	32	9	10	13	24	34	28	2–0	12	6	3–0	29	1
13	Ülküspor	32	10	7	15	35	37	27	2–1	10	5	1–0	27	1
14	Altındağ	32	9	9	14	34	43	27	2–1	8	5	1–0	24	1
15	Aydınspor	32	7	11	14	30	42	25	3–0	21	1	1–0	4	5
16	Petrolspor	32	5	14	13	18	27	24	2–0	32	1	2–1	15	3
17	Beyoğluspor (R)	32	5	13	14	24	40	23	3–0	23	1	1–1	7	4

Two points for a win. Rules for classification: 1) points; 2) goal difference; 3) number of goals scored. First team is MİY in both cases, home and away. Bye weeks are shown in team's raw.
(P): Promoted to 1967–68 Turkish First Football League; (R): Relegated to 1967–68 Turkish Third Football League.
Source: 1966–67 Turkish Second Football League in Cem Pekin Archives; and in mackolik.com; and advanced searched performed in Milliyet online archive for 1966–67 Mersin İdmanyurdu season.

=== Results by round ===
Results of games MİY played in 1966–67 Second League Red Group by rounds:

Round	1	2	3	4	5	6	7	8	9	10	11	12	13	14	15	16	17	18	19	20	21	22	23	24	25	26	27	28	29	30	31	32	33	34
Ground	A	A	H	A	H	B	A	H	A	H	A	H	A	H	A	H	A	H	H	A	H	A	H	A	B	H	A	H	A	H	A	H	A	H
Result	D	L	W	W	W		D	W	L	W	D	W	W	W	W	W	D	W	W	D	W	D	W	W		W	W	W	W	W	L	W	L	W
Position	11	14	10	5	5	7	4	5	7	5	6	6	5	5	3	2	2	2	1	1	1	1	1	1	1	1	1	1	1	1	1	1	1	1

Source: 1966–67 Turkish Second Football League pages.
A = Away; H = Home; B = Bye; W = Win; D = Draw; L = Loss

=== First half ===
11 September 1966 Round 1	Sakaryaspor	2 – 2	Mersin İdmanyurdu	City Stadium, Adapazarı
Sunday, 16:30	Musa Çetiner 75'; Kadri Aytaç 80' (o.g.)	Report	20' Tarık Arıtan; 25' Tarık Arıtan	Referee: Orhan Korkmaz

25 September 1966 Round 2	Bandırmaspor	3 – 0	Mersin İdmanyurdu	City Stadium, Balıkesir
Sunday, 16:00	Şeref Çalık 14'; Cengiz Tomaç 29'; Soner Metiner 85'	Report		Referee: Fehmi Pazarcı

2 October 1966 Round 3	Mersin İdmanyurdu	2 – 0	Denizlispor	Tevfik Sırrı Gür Stadium, Mersin
Sunday, 16:30	Ayhan Öz 7'; Osman Arpacıoğlu 75'	Report		Referee: Nevzat Tansuk

16 October 1966 Round 4	Aydınspor	0 – 1	Mersin İdmanyurdu	City Stadium, Aydın
Sunday, 15:00		Report	75' Osman Arpacıoğlu	Referee: Orhan Yorulmaz

23 October 1966 Round 5	Mersin İdmanyurdu	1 – 0	Beykoz	Tevfik Sırrı Gür Stadium, Mersin
Sunday, 14:30	Vural Olşen 43'; Kadri Aytaç (red card); Vural Olşen (red card)	Report	(red card) Vural Yılmaz	Referee: İlhan Özkan

30 October 1966 Round 6	Mersin İdmanyurdu	v	BYE
		Note

5 November 1966 Round 7	Beyoğluspor	1 – 1	Mersin İdmanyurdu	Vefa Stadium, Istanbul
Saturday, 13:00	Avram Papanastasiu 15' (pen.)	Report	36' Osman Arpacıoğlu	Referee: Veli Necdet Arığ

20 November 1966 Round 8	Mersin İdmanyurdu	2 – 1	Altındağ	Tevfik Sırrı Gür Stadium, Mersin
Sunday, 14:15	Osman Arpacıoğlu 47'; Osman Arpacıoğlu 54'	Report	44' Tevfik Gülcan	Referee: Burhan Özduygu

18 December 1966 Round 9	Antalyaspor	1 – 0	Mersin İdmanyurdu	City Stadium, Antalya
Sunday, 14:00	Bülent Yüzbaş 70'	Report		Referee: Hikmet Kolankaya

1 January 1967 Round 10	Mersin İdmanyurdu	2 – 1	Ülküspor	Tevfik Sırrı Gür Stadium, Mersin
Sunday, 14:00	Osman Arpacıoğlu 36'; Osman Arpacıoğlu 57'	Report	70' Kahraman İnan	Referee: Hamza Özdağ

15 January 1967 Round 11	Zonguldakspor	1 – 1	Mersin İdmanyurdu	City Stadium, Zonguldak
Sunday, 14:00	Orhan Ünal 89'; Saim Us (red card) 87'	Report	30' Tarık Arıtan	Referee: Macit Sarıdana

22 January 1967 Round 12	Mersin İdmanyurdu	2 – 0	Adanaspor	Ankara
Wednesday, 14:00	Alp Sümeralp 18'; Osman Arpacıoğlu 70'	Report		Referee: Necdet Oralalp
Note: Delayed to 26 April 1967 due to rising action

29 January 1967 Round 13	Sarıyer	1 – 2	Mersin İdmanyurdu	Mithatpaşa Stadium, Istanbul
Sunday, 12:00	Ruli 62'	Report	1' Vural Olşen; 64' Kadri Aytaç	Referee: Vedat Sığındere

5 February 1967 Round 14	Mersin İdmanyurdu	2 – 1	Karagümrük	Tevfik Sırrı Gür Stadium, Mersin
Sunday, 14:00	Vural Olşen 13'; Alp Sümeralp 60'	Report	11' İlhan Söyler	Referee: Fehmi Pazarcı

11 February 1967 Round 15	Petrolspor	1 – 2	Mersin İdmanyurdu	19 Mayıs Stadium, Ankara
Saturday, 14:15	Burhan Geçer 78'	Report	36' Osman Arpacıoğlu; 51' Osman Arpacıoğlu	Referee: Orhan Korkmaz

19 February 1967 Round 16	Mersin İdmanyurdu	5 – 1	Manisaspor	Tevfik Sırrı Gür Stadium, Mersin
Sunday, 14:30	Refik Çoğum 20'; Kadri Aytaç 37'; Osman Arpacıoğlu 67'; Ayhan Öz 78'; Osman Arpacıoğlu 86'	Report	75' İsmet Yılmaz	Referee: Lütfü Kuşdemir

26 February 1967 Round 17	Edirnespor	0 – 0	Mersin İdmanyurdu	City Stadium, Edirne
Sunday, 14:30		Report		Referee: İbrahim fırla

=== Second half ===
5 March 1967 Round 18	Mersin İdmanyurdu	5 – 1	Sakaryaspor	Tevfik Sırrı Gür Stadium, Mersin
Sunday, 14:45	Ayhan Öz 6'; Kadri Aytaç 27'; Alp Sümeralp 37'; Osman Arpacıoğlu 77'; Kadri Aytaç 87'	Report	29' Mike	Referee: Hamza Özdağ

12 March 1967 Round 19	Mersin İdmanyurdu	3 – 0	Bandırmaspor	Tevfik Sırrı Gür Stadium, Mersin
Sunday, 14:45	Kadri Aytaç 59'; Alp Sümeralp 79'; Kadri Aytaç 86'	Report		Referee: Lütfü Kuşdemir

19 March 1967 Round 20	Denizlispor	0 – 0	Mersin İdmanyurdu	City Stadium, Denizli
Sunday, 14:45		Report		Referee: Orhan Gönül

26 March 1967 Round 21	Mersin İdmanyurdu	3 – 0	Aydınspor	Tevfik Sırrı Gür Stadium, Mersin
Sunday, 14:30	Uğur Yıldırım 9'; Renda Dikmen 27'; Ayhan Öz 60'	Report		Referee: Nevzat Tansuk

26 March 1967 Round 22	Beykoz	1 – 1	Mersin İdmanyurdu	Ali Sami Yen Stadium, Istanbul
Sunday, 13:45	Cemal Topaloğlu 55'	Report	73' (o.g.) Adnan Gacamer	Referee: Georghe (Romania)

9 April 1967 Round 23	Mersin İdmanyurdu	3 – 0	Beyoğluspor	Tevfik Sırrı Gür Stadium, Mersin
Sunday, 15:00	Osman Arpacıoğlu 25'; Osman Arpacıoğlu 74'; Kadri Aytaç 79'	Report		Referee: Necdet Oralalp

16 April 1967 Round 24	Altındağ	0 – 1	Mersin İdmanyurdu	Ankaragücü Stadium, Ankara
Sunday, 13:30		Report	22' Osman Arpacıoğlu	Referee: İbrahim Fırla

23 April 1967 Round 25	BYE	v	Mersin İdmanyurdu

30 April 1967 Round 26	Mersin İdmanyurdu	4 – 0	Antalyaspor	Tevfik Sırrı Gür Stadium, Mersin
Sunday, 15:30	Tarık Arıtan 2'; Vural Olşen 17'; Osman Arpacıoğlu 38'; Vural Olşen 87'	Report		Referee: Sabahattin Ladikli

7 May 1967 Round 27	Ülküspor	0 – 1	Mersin İdmanyurdu	Alsancak Stadium, İzmir
Sunday, 12:30		Report	11' Tarık Arıtan	Referee: Zülbahar Sağnak

14 May 1967 Round 28	Mersin İdmanyurdu	2 – 0	Zonguldakspor	Tevfik Sırrı Gür Stadium, Mersin
Sunday, 15:30	Kadri Aytaç 70'; Osman Arpacıoğlu 75'	Report		Referee: Muzaffer Sarvan

20 May 1967 Round 29	Adanaspor	0 – 3	Mersin İdmanyurdu	19 Mayıs Stadium, Ankara
Saturday, 15:45		Report	53' Osman Arpacıoğlu; 65' Renda Dikmen; 72' Renda Dikmen	Referee: Ziya Türkdoğan
Note: Delayed game; game was originally scheduled on 26.04.1967, Wednesday.

28 May 1967 Round 30	Mersin İdmanyurdu	3 – 0	Sarıyer	Tevfik Sırrı Gür Stadium, Mersin
Sunday, 15:45	İhsan Temen 62'; Osman Arpacıoğlu 80'; Osman Arpacıoğlu 89'	Report		Referee: Zülbahar Sağnak

3 June 1967 Round 31	Karagümrük	3 – 2	Mersin İdmanyurdu	Vefa Stadium, Istanbul
Saturday, 16:00	İlhan Söyler 7'; Selahattin Bukagilli 22'; Cengiz Erkazan 65'	Report	59' Kadri Aytaç; 67' Tarık Arıtan	Referee: Ertuğrul Aybay

11 June 1967 Round 32	Mersin İdmanyurdu	2 – 0	Petrolspor	Tevfik Sırrı Gür Stadium, Mersin
Sunday, 16:00	Battal Toktay 60'; Refik Çoğum 85'	Report		Referee: Şani Güllü

18 June 1967 Round 33	Manisaspor	2 – 1	Mersin İdmanyurdu	City Stadium, Manisa
Sunday, 16:00	Muzaffer 11'; Muzaffer 64'	Report	33' Osman Arpacıoğlu	Referee: Orhan Yorulmaz

25 June 1967 Round 34	Mersin İdmanyurdu	3 – 0	Edirnespor	Tevfik Sırrı Gür Stadium, Mersin
Sunday, 17:00	Alp Sümeralp 24'; Ayhan Öz 39'; Osman Arpacıoğlu 84'	Report		Referee: Mazhar Kerestecioğlu

=== Championship match ===
Mersin İdmanyurdu won the second league championship against Bursaspor, the White Group's winner.

27 June 1967 2. Lig Championship	Mersin İdmanyurdu	2 – 0	Bursaspor	19 Mayıs Stadium, Ankara
19:30	Osman Arpacıoğlu 24'; Ayhan Öz 36'	Report		Referee: Nevzat Tansuk

== 1966–67 Chancellor Cup ==
MİY has won the Chancellor Cup (also called Prime Minister's Cup) in 1967 (as champions of second league against İzmir Denizgücü, amateur league winner).

30 June 1976 Chancellor's Cup	Mersin İdmanyurdu	2 – 0	İzmir Denizgücü	19 Mayıs Stadium, Ankara
19:00	İhsan Temen 38'; Osman Arpacıoğlu 59'	Report		Referee: Doğan Babacan

== 1966–67 Turkish Cup participation ==
The fifth Turkish Cup in 1966–67 was played as Türkiye Kupası by 81 teams: 17 from First league, 33 from Second league, 18 from regional leagues and 15 from amateurs. Three elimination rounds (including preliminary rounds) were played in one-leg elimination system at first team's grounds. QF, SF, and finals were played in two-leg elimination system. But starting from the previous Cup finals were played in single match if the finalist were from the same city. Two İzmir teams drew in the final match; and Altay won the fifth cup by casting lots after extra time against Göztepe and become eligible for ECW. Mersin İdmanyurdu participated in Turkish Cup (Türkiye Kupası) in 1966–67 and was eliminated at preliminary round 2 of round 3 by Gençlerbirliği.

=== Cup track ===
The drawings and results Mersin İdmanyurdu (MİY) followed in 1966–67 Turkish Cup are shown in the following table.

Round	Own League	Opponent's League	Opponent	A/H	Score	Result
Round 2 Preliminary 2	Second League Red Group	Second League White Group	Adana Demirspor	H	2–1	Promoted to R2
Round 2	Second League Red Group	Amateur	Kayseri Şekerspor	A	5–2	Promoted to R3 P2
Round 3 Preliminary 2	Second League Red Group	First League	Gençlerbirliği	A	0–1	Eliminated

Note: In the above table 'Score' shows For and Against goals whether the match played at home or not.

=== Game details ===
Mersin İdmanyurdu (MİY) 1966–67 Turkish Cup game reports is shown in the following table. Kick off times are in EET and EEST.

16 November 1966 Round 2 P2	Mersin İdmanyurdu	2 – 1 (a.e.t.)	Adana Demirspor	Tevfik Sırrı Gür Stadium, Mersin
Wednesday	Vural Olşen (et)	Report	Goal	Referee: Sabahattin Ladikli

11 December 1966 Round 2	Kayseri Şekerspor	2 – 5	Mersin İdmanyurdu	City Stadium, Kayseri
Sunday, 14:15	Goal	Report	Goal

22 March 1967 Round 3 P2	Gençlerbirliği	1 – 0	Mersin İdmanyurdu	Ankaragücü Stadium, Ankara
Wednesday, 14:30	Dirani Şenon 56'	Report

Source: 1966–67 Turkish Cup pages.

== Management ==
=== Club management ===
Executive committee:

- President: Nevzat Emrealp. Deputy President: Mahir Turan. General Secretary: Aydın Özlü. General Captain: Sezai Sak. Members: Halit Gazioğlu, Ünal Şıhman, Mustafa Sözmen, Faruk Miskavi, Erol Tarhan, Sungur Baydur, Sadettin Cömert.

=== Coaching team ===
Head Coach: Lefter Küçükandonyadis. Trainer: Fahrettin Cansever.

1966–67 Mersin İdmanyurdu head coaches:

Nat	Head coach	Period	Pl	W	D	L	Notes
(Turkey)	Fahrettin Cansever	01.08.1966 – 20.01.1967	10	7	3	2	Replaced after 11th round
(Turkey)	Lefter Küçükandonyadis	20.01.1966 – 31.05.1967	26	20	3	3	Started after 11th round

Note: Only official games were included.

== 1966–67 squad ==
Stats are counted for 1966–67 Second League matches and 1966–67 Turkish Cup (Türkiye Kupası) matches. In the team rosters four substitutes were allowed to appear, two of whom were substitutable. Only the players who appeared in game rosters were included and listed in the order of appearance.

O	N	Nat	Name	Birth	Born	Pos	LA	LG	CA	CG	TA	TG	Booked	Sent off (straight red)	← Season Notes →
1	1	(Turkey)	Doğan Ölçücü			GK	17				17				→ previous season.
2	2	(Turkey)	Nihat Fırat	1936		DF	17		1		18				1966 ST PTT.
3	3	(Turkey)	Refik Çoğum	1940		MF	28	2	1		29	2			→ previous season.
4	4	(Turkey)	İhsan Tınaz			MF	4				4				→ previous season.
5	5	(Turkey)	Tarık Arıtan	1939		MF	23	6	1		24	6			→ previous season.
6	6	(Turkey)	Ayhan Öz	20 Jul 1945	Mersin	FW	18	5	1		19	5			→ previous season.
7	7	(Turkey)	Kadri Aytaç (C)	6 Aug 1931	Istanbul	FW	30	9	1		31	9			1966 ST Galatasaray.
8	8	(Turkey)	Yahya Kurt	1941		FW	3				3				1966 ST Adana Demirspor.
9	9	(Turkey)	Vural Olşen	1936		FW	9	5			9	5			1966 ST Gençlerbirliği.
10	10	(Turkey)	Renda Dikmen			FW	17	3			17	3			1966 ST Güneşspor.
11	11	(Turkey)	Uğur Yıldırım	1942		FW	11	1			11	1			1966 ST Gençlerbirliği.
12	2	(Turkey)	Mümtaz Sümer	1937		DF	20		1		21				1966 ST Ankaragücü.
13	3	(Turkey)	Selahattin Yapa			MF	6				6				1966 ST
14	6	(Turkey)	Alp Sümeralp	1938		FW	25	5	1		26	5			→ previous season.
15	8	(Turkey)	Fikret			FW	3				3				→ previous season.
16	2	(Turkey)	Battal Toktay	1939	Istanbul	DF	27	1	1		28	1			→ previous season.
17	5	(Turkey)	Osman Arpacıoğlu	5 Jan 1947	Ankara	FW	29	23	1		30	23			1966 ST Hacettepe.
18	7	(Turkey)	Mustafa Aksoy	1942		MF	10				10				1966 ST Galatasaray.
19	9	(Turkey)	Erol Yılmaz	1937		FW	2				2				→ previous season.
20	2	(Turkey)	Emin Akkoç	1937		DF	12				12				→ previous season.
21	4	(Turkey)	İhsan Temen	1938		DF	26	2	1		27	2			1966 ST Gençlerbirliği.
22	10	(Turkey)	Turan			FW	2				2				1966 ST
23	1	(Turkey)	Fikret Özdil	1943		GK	19		1		20				→ previous season.
		(Turkey)	Mustafa Özbor			MF									1966 ST Feriköy.
		(Turkey)	Abdurrahim Kaya			MF									

Sources: 1966–67 season squad data from maçkolik com, Milliyet, and Erbil (1975).

== See also ==
- Football in Turkey
