= 1965–66 Mersin İdmanyurdu season =

Mersin İdmanyurdu
1965–66 season
- President: Halit Gazioğlu
- Coach: (Turkey) Lefter Küçükandonyadis
- Stadium: City Stadium; Mersin, Turkey
- Second League: Red group: 3rd Final group: 5th
- Turkish Cup: Did not participate
- Most appearances: Mehmet Diner "Mamik": 28
- Top goalscorer: Alp Sümeralp: 10
| Home colours | Away colours | Third colours |

Mersin İdmanyurdu (also Mersin İdman Yurdu, Mersin İY, or MİY) Sports Club; located in Mersin, east Mediterranean coast of Turkey in 1965–1966. The 1965–66 season was the 3rd season of Mersin İdmanyurdu football team in Second League, the second level division in Turkey.

The club had had name "Çukurova İdmanyurdu" again under Çukurova Group sponsorship and finished 5th. On 20 July 1965 the club and fans celebrated the 40th anniversary of their foundation. Executive committee comprised Mehmet Karametmet, Halit Gazioğlu, Sezai Sak.

At the beginning of the season Fahrettin Cansever was the coach of the team. In the half season Lefter Küçükantonyadis became the manager of the team (20 January 1966). Lefter signed for four months. One month later, Lefter had been stabbed by a fan (a restaurant owner, Fikri Özkörüklü) and hospitalized. Many citizens, pupils, NGO representatives and sports people visited him in hospital and his room was filled with flowers. Lefter declared that he will not leave the team. Fahrettin Cansever became the trainer of Beykozspor (12 January 1966). On 7 June 1966 before the last match of the season, Lefter left Mersin. He said that he was compliant of the behaviours of executive committee member Sezai Sak.

== Pre-season ==
- Preparation game: ÇİY-Türkocağı: 4–1.
- Spor-Toto Cup: 15 August 1965 - Adana Demirspor-ÇİY: 0–2. Sunday, 17:00. City Stadium, Adana. Goals: Mehmet.
- Spor-Toto Cup: 22 August 1965 - ÇİY-Adana Demirspor: 0–0. Sunday. Mersin.
- Preparation game: 29 September 1965. ÇİY-Adana Milli Mensucat. Sunday.

== 1965–66 Second League participation ==
Second League 1965–66 was played by 22 teams in two groups (red and white), 11 in each. Top four teams played promotion group matches in league format. Bottom teams played relegation play-out. Top two teams promoted to First League 1966–67.

=== Results summary ===
Mersin İdmanyurdu (MİY) 1965–66 Second League summary:

| | Overall | | | | | | | | | Home | | | | | | | | Away | | | | | | | |
| Stage | Pc | Pl | W | D | L | GF | GA | GD | Pt | Pl | W | D | L | GF | GA | GD | Pt | Pl | W | D | L | GF | GA | GD | Pt |
|---|---|---|---|---|---|---|---|---|---|---|---|---|---|---|---|---|---|---|---|---|---|---|---|---|---|
| Ranking group | 2 | 20 | 9 | 7 | 4 | 26 | 13 | +13 | 25 | 10 | 7 | 3 | 0 | 20 | 6 | +14 | 17 | 10 | 2 | 4 | 4 | 6 | 7 | -1 | 8 |
| Final group | 5 | 14 | 6 | 3 | 5 | 21 | 16 | +5 | 15 | 7 | 4 | 1 | 2 | 11 | 7 | +4 | 9 | 7 | 2 | 2 | 3 | 10 | 9 | +1 | 6 |
| Overall | | 34 | 15 | 10 | 9 | 47 | 29 | +18 | 40 | 17 | 11 | 4 | 2 | 31 | 13 | +18 | 26 | 17 | 4 | 6 | 7 | 16 | 16 | 0 | 14 |

Sources: 1965–66 Turkish Second Football League pages.

=== Ranking group performance ===
The 1965–66 season Red Group (stage 1) matches of Çukurova İdmanyurdu (ÇİY) vs other team are shown in league table below.

| Pc | Team | Games | | | | Goals | | Pts | Home | | | Away | | |
| Pc | Team | Pl | W | D | L | F | A | Pts | F–A | R | Pc | F–A | R | Pc |
|---|---|---|---|---|---|---|---|---|---|---|---|---|---|---|
| 1 | Altınordu (Q) | 20 | 13 | 5 | 2 | 31 | 9 | 31 | 1–0 | 8 | 3 | 0–1 | 15 | 4 |
| 2 | Çukurova İdmanyurdu (Q) | 20 | 9 | 7 | 4 | 26 | 13 | 25 | – | 9 | 4 | – | 14 | 3 |
| 3 | Beyoğluspor (Q) | 20 | 9 | 7 | 4 | 26 | 13 | 25 | 1–1 | 6 | 2 | 0–0 | 17 | 3 |
| 4 | Sakaryaspor (Q) | 20 | 9 | 5 | 6 | 20 | 19 | 23 | 3–0 | 19 | 2 | 0–1 | 4 | 2 |
| 5 | Manisaspor | 20 | 8 | 6 | 6 | 24 | 24 | 22 | 4–2 | 3 | 1 | 0–1 | 20 | 2 |
| 6 | Bandırmaspor | 20 | 7 | 5 | 8 | 22 | 27 | 19 | 0–0 | 13 | 3 | 1–1 | 10 | 5 |
| 7 | Karagümrük | 20 | 5 | 8 | 7 | 19 | 24 | 18 | 3–1 | 18 | 3 | 1–1 | 5 | 2 |
| 8 | Petrolspor | 20 | 6 | 3 | 11 | 21 | 33 | 15 | 4–0 | 12 | 2 | 2–0 | 1 | 2 |
| 9 | Sarıyer | 20 | 5 | 5 | 10 | 13 | 22 | 15 | 1–0 | 11 | 3 | 1–0 | 22 | 2 |
| 10 | Altındağ | 20 | 5 | 4 | 11 | 20 | 30 | 14 | 3–1 | 16 | 3 | 0–1 | 7 | 5 |
| 11 | Ülküspor (R) | 20 | 3 | 7 | 10 | 17 | 22 | 13 | 1–1 | 2 | 2 | 1–1 | 21 | 2 |

Two points for a win. Rules for classification: 1) points; 2) goal difference; 3) number of goals scored. First team is ÇİY in both cases, home and away.
(Q): Qualified for Final Group; (R): Relegated to Regional Amateur League after relegation play-outs.
Sources: 1965–66 Turkish Second Football League Cem Pekin Archives; and advanced searched performed in Milliyet online archive for 1965–66 Mersin İdmanyurdu season.

Ranking group games

| 5 September 1965 Round 1 | Petrolspor | 0 – 2 | Çukurova İdmanyurdu | Ankaragücü Stadium, Ankara |
| Sunday, 16:30 | | Report | 62' Mehmet Diner; 78' Hüseyin İlgin | Referee: Nazif Oturgan |

| 12 September 1965 Round 2 | Çukurova İdmanyurdu | 1 – 1 | Ülküspor | City Stadium, Mersin |
| Sunday, 16:00 | Erol Yılmaz (pen.) | Report | Goal |

| 19 September 1965 Round 3 | Çukurova İdmanyurdu | 4 – 2 | Manisaspor | City Stadium, Mersin |
| Sunday, 16:00 | Hüseyin İlgin; Alp Sümeralp; Ayhan Öz; Ayhan Öz | Report | Goal |

| 26 September 1965 Round 4 | Sakaryaspor | 1 – 0 | Çukurova İdmanyurdu | City Stadium, Adapazarı |
| Sunday, 16:00 | Fikret Aldinç 74' (pen.) | Report | | Referee: Necdet Türkantoz |

| 3 October 1965 Round 5 | Karagümrük | 1 – 1 | Çukurova İdmanyurdu | Vefa Stadium, Istanbul |
| Sunday, 16:00 | Cengiz Özyalçın 3' | Report | 47' Alp Sümeralp | Referee: Nuri Güneş |

| 9 October 1965 Round 6 | Çukurova İdmanyurdu | 1 – 1 | Beyoğluspor | City Stadium, Mersin |
| Saturday, 16:00 | Mehmet Diner | Report | Goal |

| 17 October 1965 Round 7 | Altındağ | 1 – 0 | Çukurova İdmanyurdu | Ankaragücü Stadium, Ankara |
| Sunday, 15:00 | Goal | Report | | Referee: Halil Eraydın |

| 23 October 1965 Round 8 | Çukurova İdmanyurdu | 1 – 0 | Altınordu | City Stadium, Mersin |
| Saturday, 15:00 | Ayhan Öz 43' | Report |

| 31 October 1965 Round 9 | Çukurova İdmanyurdu | – | Bye |
| Sunday, 15:00 |

| 7 November 1965 Round 10 | Bandırmaspor | 1 – 1 | Çukurova İdmanyurdu | City Stadium, Balıkesir |
| Sunday, 14:30 | Goal | Report | Alp Sümeralp |

| 14 November 1965 Round 11 | Çukurova İdmanyurdu | 1 – 0 | Sarıyer | City Stadium, Mersin |
| Sunday, 14:00 | Alp Sümeralp 20' | Report | | Referee: Necdet Oralalp |

| 5 December 1965 Round 12 | Çukurova İdmanyurdu | 4 – 0 | Petrolspor | City Stadium, Mersin |
| Sunday, 14:00 | Alp Sümeralp 3'; Alp Sümeralp 37'; Yalçın Uğraş 60'; Mehmet Diner 88' | Report | | Referee: Burhan Özduygu |

| 12 December 1965 Round 13 | Çukurova İdmanyurdu | 0 – 0 | Bandırmaspor | City Stadium, Mersin |
| Sunday, 14:00 | | Report | | Referee: Zülbahar Sağnak |

| 19 December 1965 Round 14 | Bye | – | Çukurova İdmanyurdu |
| Sunday |

| 25 December 1965 Round 15 | Altınordu | 1 – 0 | Çukurova İdmanyurdu | Alsancak Stadium, İzmir |
| Saturday, 12:00 | Yılmaz Dinçer 39' | Report | | Referee: Orhan Korkmaz |

| 2 January 1966 Round 16 | Çukurova İdmanyurdu | 3 – 1 | Altındağ | City Stadium, Mersin |
| Sunday, 14:00 | Yalçın Uğraş 6'; Erol Yılmaz 14'; Tarık Arıtan 88' | Report | 84' Alpay Ergün | Referee: Lütfü Kuşdemir |

| 8 January 1966 Round 17 | Beyoğluspor | 0 – 0 | Çukurova İdmanyurdu | Mithatpaşa Stadium, Istanbul |
| Saturday, 14:00 | | Report | | Referee: Vedat Sığındere |

| 16 January 1966 Round 18 | Çukurova İdmanyurdu | 3 – 1 | Karagümrük | City Stadium, Mersin |
| Sunday, 13:30 | Hüseyin İlgin 3'; Yalçın Uğraş 5'; Alp Sümeralp 7' | Report | 77' Can Açıkgöz | Referee: Nadi Irmaklar |

| 23 January 1966 Round 19 | Çukurova İdmanyurdu | 2 – 0 | Sakaryaspor | City Stadium, Mersin |
| Sunday, 14:00 | Goal | Report |

| 30 January 1966 Round 20 | Manisaspor | 1 – 0 | Çukurova İdmanyurdu | 19 Mayıs Stadium, Manisa |
| Sunday, 14:00 | Fevzi Türegün 31' | Report | | Referee: Avni Yelkenbiçer |

| 6 February 1966 Round 21 | Ülküspor | 1 – 1 | Çukurova İdmanyurdu | Alsancak Stadium, İzmir |
| Sunday, 10:30 | Kahraman İnan 46' (pen.) | Report | 69' Sami İlgin | Referee: Veli Necdet Arığ |

| 12 February 1966 Round 22 | Sarıyer | 0 – 1 | Çukurova İdmanyurdu | Mithatpaşa Stadium, Istanbul |
| Saturday, 12:30 | | Report | 37' (F) Alp Sümeralp | Referee: İbrahim Fırla |

Sources: Cem Pekin Archives, Milliyet Online Archive, Maçkolik, Erbil (1975).

=== Final group performance ===
The 1965–66 season promotion group (stage 2) matches of Çukurova İdmanyurdu (ÇİY) vs other team are shown in league table below.

| Pc | Team | Games | | | | Goals | | Pts | Home | | | Away | | |
| Pc | Team | Pl | W | D | L | F | A | Pts | F–A | R | Pc | F–A | R | Pc |
|---|---|---|---|---|---|---|---|---|---|---|---|---|---|---|
| 1 | Eskişehirspor (P) | 14 | 8 | 5 | 1 | 22 | 7 | 21 | 1–2 | 13 | 5 | 1–1 | 6 | 2 |
| 2 | Altınordu (P) | 14 | 10 | 1 | 3 | 25 | 9 | 21 | 2–1 | 1 | 2 | 0–1 | 8 | 3 |
| 3 | Bursaspor | 14 | 8 | 3 | 3 | 23 | 9 | 19 | 0–0 | 7 | 3 | 0–4 | 14 | 5 |
| 4 | Adana Demirspor | 14 | 7 | 2 | 5 | 22 | 17 | 16 | 1–2 | 11 | 5 | 0–1 | 4 | 3 |
| 5 | Çukurova İdmanyurdu | 14 | 6 | 3 | 5 | 21 | 16 | 15 | | | | | | |
| 6 | Sakaryaspor | 14 | 4 | 6 | 4 | 15 | 15 | 14 | 2–1 | 9 | 4 | 0–0 | 2 | 1 |
| 7 | Güneşspor | 14 | 0 | 3 | 11 | 9 | 26 | 3 | 2–1 | 5 | 3 | 5–2 | 12 | 3 |
| 8 | Beyoğluspor | 14 | 0 | 3 | 11 | 6 | 44 | 3 | 3–0 | 3 | 1 | 4–0 | 10 | 2 |

Two points for a win. Rules for classification: 1) points; 2) goal difference; 3) number of goals scored. First team is ÇİY in both cases, home and away.
(P): Promoted to 1966–67 Turkish First Football League.
Sources: 1965–66 Turkish Second Football League Cem Pekin Archives; and advanced searched performed in Milliyet online archive for 1965–66 Mersin İdmanyurdu season.

Final group games

| 6 March 1966 Round 1 | Çukurova İdmanyurdu | 2 – 1 | Altınordu | City Stadium, Mersin |
| Sunday, 14:30 | Mehmet Diner 19' (F); İbrahim Güner 28' (pen.) | Report | 78' (pen.) Nehir Çetintaş | Attendance: 25.000; Referee: Necdet Şener |

| 13 March 1966 Round 2 | Sakaryaspor | 0 – 0 | Çukurova İdmanyurdu | City Stadium, Adapazarı |
| Sunday, 15:00 | | Report | | Referee: Vedat Sığındere |

| 20 March 1966 Round 3 | Çukurova İdmanyurdu | 3 – 0 | Beyoğluspor | City Stadium, Mersin |
| Sunday, 15:30 | Mehmet Diner 9' (F); Ayhan Öz 58' (F); Doğan Ölçücü 88' (pen.) | Report | | Referee: Ziya Türkdoğan |

| 27 March 1966 Round 4 | Adana Demirspor | 1 – 0 | Çukurova İdmanyurdu | City Stadium, Adana |
| Sunday, 15:00 | Yaşar Kartal 35' | Report | | Referee: Nadi Irmaklar |

| 3 April 1966 Round 5 | Çukurova İdmanyurdu | 2 – 1 | Güneşspor | City Stadium, Mersin |
| Sunday, 14:30 | Ayhan Öz 14'; Mehmet Diner 73' | Report | 85' Levent Engineri |

| 10 April 1966 Round 6 | Eskişehirspor | 1 – 1 | Çukurova İdmanyurdu | Atatürk Stadium, Eskişehir |
| Sunday, 15:30 | Muzaffer Çil 66' | Report | 30' Ayhan Öz | Referee: Veli Necdet Arığ |

| 17 April 1966 Round 7 | Çukurova İdmanyurdu | 0 – 0 | Bursaspor | City Stadium, Mersin |
| Sunday, 15:30 | | Report | | Referee: Rıfat Atakanı |

| 1 May 1966 Round 8 | Altınordu | 1 – 0 | Çukurova İdmanyurdu | Alsancak Stadium, İzmir |
| Sunday, 14:00 | Cenap Genç 21' | Report | | Referee: Sabahattin Ladikli |

| 8 May 1966 Round 9 | Çukurova İdmanyurdu | 2 – 1 | Sakaryaspor | City Stadium, Mersin |
| Sunday, 15:30 | Alp Sümeralp 16'; Ayhan Öz 58' | Report | 75' Bultan Dölek | Referee: Hamza Özdağ |

| 15 May 1966 Round 10 | Beyoğluspor | 0 – 4 | Çukurova İdmanyurdu | Mithatpaşa Stadium, Istanbul |
| Sunday, 14:00 | | Report | 9' Ayhan Öz; 75' Hüseyin İlgin; 78' Alp Sümeralp; 87' Hüseyin İlgin | Referee: Nadi Irmaklar |

| 22 May 1966 Round 11 | Çukurova İdmanyurdu | 1 – 2 | Adana Demirspor | City Stadium, Mersin |
| Sunday, 16:00 | Erol Yılmaz 33' | Report | 72' Hasan Sınmaz; 85' Özden Uçal | Referee: Franz Wöhrer (Austria) |

| 29 May 1966 Round 12 | Güneşspor | 2 – 5 | Çukurova İdmanyurdu | 19 Mayıs Stadium, Ankara |
| Sunday. 14:00 | Cahit Eruz 26'; Cahit Eruz 82' | Report | 51' Tarık Arıtan; 59' Alp Sümeralp; 66' Mehmet Diner; 76' Alp Sümeralp; 87' Tarık Arıtan | Referee: Mehmet Bahadır |

| 4 June 1966 Round 13 | Çukurova İdmanyurdu | 1 – 2 | Eskişehirspor | City Stadium, Mersin |
| Saturday, 16:00 | Ayhan Öz 78' | Report | 16' Nihat Atacan; 88' Fethi Heper | Referee: Pius Kamber (Switzerland) |

| 12 June 1966 Round 14 | Bursaspor | 4 – 0 | Çukurova İdmanyurdu | Atatürk Stadium, Bursa |
| Sunday, 16:00 | Ersel Altıparmak 14'; Mesut Şen 40'; Ayhan Özemre 69'; Mustafa Güvenç (B.) 86' | Report | | Referee: Karl Riegg (Germany) |

Sources: Cem Pekin Archives, Milliyet Online Archive, and Maçkolik.

== 1965–66 Turkish Cup participation ==
1965–66 Turkish Cup was the fourth cup and played by 71 teams: 16 First League teams (1), 20 Second League teams (2), 19 teams from regional leagues (R), and 16 amateur teams (A). Galatasaray has won the cup for the fourth time consecutively and became eligible for playing ECW next year. ÇİY and Yeşildirek were penalized due to last season draw outs. So ÇİY couldn't participated in fourth cup.

== Management ==
=== Club management ===
Executive committee:

- President: Halit Gazioğlu. Deputy President: Mehmet Mehmetoğlu. General Secretary: Aydın Özlü. Members: Mahir Turan, Erol Tarhan, Sezai Sak, Victor Venüs, Sedat Gülergün.

=== Coaching team ===
Head Coach: Fahrettin Cansever.

1965–66 Mersin İdmanyurdu head coaches:

| Nat | Head coach | Period | Pl | W | D | L | Notes |
|---|---|---|---|---|---|---|---|
| (Turkey) | Fahrettin Cansever | 01.08.1965 – 12.01.1966 | | | | | Left after 17th round |
| | | 13.01.1966 – 19.01.1966 | 1 | 1 | – | – | |
| (Turkey) | Lefter Küçükandonyadis | 20.01.1966 – 07.06.1966 | | | | | Left before the last round. |
| | | 07.06.1966 – 12.06.1966 | 1 | 1 | – | – | |

Note: Only official games were included.

== 1965–66 squad ==
Stats are counted for 1965–66 Second League matches. In the team rosters four substitutes were allowed to appear, two of whom were substitutable. Only the players who appeared in game rosters were included and listed in the order of appearance.

| O | N | Nat | Name | Birth | Born | Pos | LA | LG | CA | CG | TA | TG | Booked | Sent off (straight red) | ← Season Notes → |
|---|---|---|---|---|---|---|---|---|---|---|---|---|---|---|---|
| 1 | 1 | (Turkey) | Yusuf Şimşek | 2 Nov 1938 | Samsun | GK | 13 | | | | 13 | | | | 1965 ST Şekerspor. |
| 2 | 2 | (Turkey) | Battal Toktay | 1939 | Istanbul | DF | 18 | | | | 18 | | | | 1965 ST Şekerspor. |
| 3 | 3 | (Turkey) | Mehmet Diner | | | MF | 28 | 5 | | | 28 | 5 | | | → previous season. |
| 4 | 4 | (Turkey) | Refik Çoğum | 1940 | | MF | 22 | | | | 22 | | | | → previous season. |
| 5 | 5 | (Turkey) | İbrahim Güner | | | MF | 19 | 1 | | | 19 | 1 | | | |
| 6 | 6 | (Turkey) | Fuat | | | MF | 1 | | | | 1 | | | | |
| 7 | 7 | (Turkey) | Alp Sümeralp | 1938 | | FW | 26 | 10 | | | 26 | 10 | | | → previous season. |
| 8 | 8 | (Turkey) | Hüseyin İlgin | | | FW | 20 | 4 | | | 20 | 4 | | | → previous season. |
| 9 | 9 | (Turkey) | Erol Yılmaz | 1937 | | FW | 12 | 2 | | | 12 | 2 | | | → previous season. |
| 10 | 10 | (Turkey) | Saba | | | FW | 1 | | | | 1 | | | | → previous season. |
| 11 | 11 | (Turkey) | Fikret | | | FW | 1 | | | | 1 | | | | |
| 12 | 2 | (Turkey) | Emin Akkoç | 1937 | | DF | 26 | | | | 26 | | | | → previous season. |
| 13 | 5 | (Turkey) | Tarık Arıtan | 1941 | | MF | 22 | 3 | | | 22 | 3 | | | → previous season. |
| 14 | 9 | (Turkey) | Ayhan Öz | 20 Jul 1945 | Mersin | FW | 19 | 7 | | | 19 | 7 | | | First time professional. |
| 15 | 11 | (Turkey) | Baha | | | FW | 4 | 1 | | | 4 | 1 | | | |
| 16 | 5 | (Turkey) | Sami İlgin | | | MF | 12 | 1 | | | 12 | 1 | | | → previous season. |
| 17 | 7 | (Turkey) | Yalçın Uğraş | 1936 | | FW | 14 | 3 | | | 14 | 3 | | | 1965 ST Şekerspor. |
| 18 | 8 | (Turkey) | Olcay Cambaz | | | FW | 4 | | | | 4 | | | | |
| 19 | 1 | (Turkey) | Doğan Ölçücü | | | GK | 6 | 1 | | | 6 | 1 | | | → previous season. |
| 20 | 10 | (Turkey) | Roni Kumdereli | 1940 | | FW | 5 | | | | 5 | | | | → previous season. |
| 21 | 11 | (Turkey) | Oktay Güneri | | | MF | 3 | | | | 3 | | | | → previous season. |
| 22 | 2 | (Turkey) | İhsan Tınaz | | | DF | 18 | | | | 18 | | | | 1966 WT Adana Demirspor. |
| 23 | 10 | (Turkey) | Münür Genç | | | FW | 2 | | | | 2 | | | | → previous season. |
| 24 | 7 | (Turkey) | Zafer Buran | | | FW | 1 | | | | 1 | | | | 1966 WT Beyoğluspor. |
| 25 | 6 | (Turkey) | Tevfik | | | MF | 2 | | | | 2 | | | | |
| 26 | 11 | (Turkey) | Arif | | | FW | 1 | | | | 1 | | | | |
| 27 | 1 | (Turkey) | Fikret Özdil | 1943 | | GK | 10 | | | | 10 | | | | 1966 WT PTT. |
| 28 | 5 | (Turkey) | Zeki | | | MF | 1 | | | | 1 | | | | |

Source: 1964–65 season squad data from maçkolik com, Milliyet, and Erbil (1975).

== See also ==
- Football in Turkey
