= 1964–65 Mersin İdmanyurdu season =

Çukurova İdmanyurdu
1964–65 season
- President: (Turkey) Mehmet Karamehmet
- Head coach: (Turkey) İlhan Taşucu
- Stadium: Mersin 19 Mayıs Stadium; Mersin, Turkey
- Second League: 3rd
- Turkish Cup: Eliminated at R3 P2
- Most appearances: (Turkey) Hüseyin İlgin (25)
- Top goalscorer: League: (Turkey) Alp Sümeralp (10); All: (Turkey) Alp Sümeralp (10)
Home colours	Away colours	Third colours

Mersin İdmanyurdu (also Mersin İdman Yurdu, Mersin İY, or MİY) Sports Club; located in Mersin, east Mediterranean coast of Turkey in 1964-1965. The 1964–65 season was the 2nd season of Mersin İdmanyurdu football team in Second League, the second level division in Turkey. The team finished 1964–65 Second League at third place. The team also participated in 1964–65 Turkish Cup (Türkiye Kupası) and was eliminated at third round.

The club name was Çukurova İdmanyurdu due to sponsorship reasons. The president of the club was Mehmet Karamehmet. Head coach was İlhan Taşucu. The season started with Spor-Toto Cup games in August 1964 and ended with the last round game on 3 April 1965. The most appeared player was Hüseyin İlgin, while top goalscorer was Alp Sümeralp.

== Pre-season ==
- Preparation games: ÇİY- Tarsus K.: 3-2. ÇİY-Tarsus K.: 3-2.
- Spor-Toto Cup: 30.08.1964 - Adana Demirspor-ÇİY: 2-1. Sunday, 16:00. Adana.

== 1964–65 Second League participation ==
In its second season, 1964–65 Second League was played by 16 teams, 11 from previous season, three relegated from first league, one from amateur championship, and one other professionalized team from Anatolia. The league season started on 5 September 1964 and finished on 4 April 1965. Winner of the league promoted to First League 1965–-66. No team relegated due to expansion demands.

Çukurova İdmanyurdu finished third with 18 wins and 42 goals.

=== Results summary ===
Mersin İdmanyurdu (MİY) 1964–65 Second League summary:

	Overall									Home								Away							
Stage	Pc	Pl	W	D	L	GF	GA	GD	Pt	Pl	W	D	L	GF	GA	GD	Pt	Pl	W	D	L	GF	GA	GD	Pt
First half	1	15	10	2	3	23	12	+11	22	7	6	0	1	12	4	+8	12	8	4	2	2	11	8	+3	10
Second half		15	8	2	5	19	12	+6	18	8	7	1	0	16	3	+13	15	7	1	1	5	3	9	-6	3
Overall	3	30	18	4	8	42	24	+18	40	15	13	1	1	28	7	+21	27	15	5	3	7	14	17	-3	13

Sources: 1964–65 Turkish Second Football League pages.

=== League table ===
Second League 1964–65 season game results of Çukurova İdmanyurdu (ÇİY) vs other team are shown in league table below:

Pc	Team	Games				Goals		Pts	Home			Away		
Pc	Team	Pl	W	D	L	F	A	Pts	F–A	R	Pc	F–A	R	Pc
1	Vefa (P)	30	19	4	7	58	27	42	3–2	6	5	1–2	26	2
2	Bursaspor	30	16	10	4	51	26	42	1–0	14	2	1–2	18	2
3	Çukurova İdmanyurdu	30	18	4	8	42	24	40	–	–	–	–	–	–
4	Karşıyaka	30	16	5	9	48	41	37	1–0	16	1	2–1	5	9
5	Beyoğluspor	30	13	8	9	50	39	34	4–0	29	2	1–1	12	4
6	Adana Demirspor	30	14	5	11	40	34	33	1–2	1	14	0–1	19	4
7	Sarıyer	30	11	9	10	50	38	31	3–0	2	10	0–3	27	2
8	Beylerbeyi	30	8	13	9	35	34	29	1–0	7	5	0–1	30	3
9	Petrolspor	30	9	10	11	23	27	28	1–0	25	1	3–1	8	1
10	Ülküspor	30	10	8	12	38	45	28	3–1	17	1	0–1	4	9
11	Güneşspor	30	7	13	10	34	39	27	2–2	28	2	2–1	9	1
12	Yeşildirek	30	8	9	13	24	42	25	2–0	24	1	0–0	11	2
13	Karagümrük	30	9	6	15	37	52	24	1–0	21	1	0–1	13	4
14	Altındağ	30	9	4	17	36	48	22	2–0	3	10	1–0	22	1
15	Kasımpaşa	30	7	8	15	28	47	22	2–0	20	2	3–2	10	1
16	Manisa Sakaryaspor	30	3	10	17	22	53	16	1–0	15	1	0–0	23	1

Two points for a win. Rules for classification: 1) points; 2) goal difference; 3) number of goals scored. In the score columns first scores belong to ÇİY.
(P): Promoted to 1965–66 Turkish First Football League; (R): Relegated to Regional Amateur League. No team relegated.
Sources: 1964–65 Turkish Second Football League pages.

=== Results by round ===
Results of games MİY played in 1964–65 Second League Red Group by rounds:

Round	1	2	3	4	5	6	7	8	9	10	11	12	13	14	15	16	17	18	19	20	21	22	23	24	25	26	27	28	29	30
Ground	H	H	H	A	A	H	H	A	A	A	A	A	A	H	H	H	H	A	A	H	H	A	A	H	H	A	A	H	H	A
Result	L	W	W	L	W	W	W	W	W	W	D	D	L	W	W	W	W	L	L	W	W	W	D	W	W	L	L	D	W	L
Position	14	10	10	9	9	5	5	1	1	1	2	4	4	2	1	1	1	2	4	2	1	1	1	1	1	2	2	2	2	3

Source: 1964–65 Turkish Second Football League pages.
A = Away; H = Home; W = Win; D = Draw; L = Loss

=== First half ===
Mersin İdmanyurdu (MİY) 1964–65 Second League season first half game reports is shown in the following table. Kick off times are in EET and EEST.

6 September 1964 Round 1	Çukurova İdmanyurdu	1 – 2	Adana Demirspor	19 Mayıs Stadium, Mersin
Sunday, 17:00	Tarık Arıtan 40'	Report	7' Hasan Çelik; 76' Ayhan Türközü	Referee: Sabahattin Ladikli

26 September 1964 Round 2	Çukurova İdmanyurdu	3 – 0	Sarıyer	19 Mayıs Stadium, Mersin
Saturday, 16:30	Münür Genç 14'; Alp Sümeralp 37'; Hüseyin İlgin 48'	Report		Referee: Vedat Sığındere

27 September 1964 Round 3	Çukurova İdmanyurdu	2 – 0	Altındağ	19 Mayıs Stadium, Mersin
Sunday, 16:30	Hüseyin İlgin; Alp Sümeralp	Report

10 October 1964 Round 4	Ülküspor	1 – 0	Çukurova İdmanyurdu	Alsancak Stadium, İzmir
Saturday, 15:15	Zahit Çelikaltay 68'	Report		Referee: Veli Necdet Arığ

11 October 1964 Round 5	Karşıyaka	1 – 2	Çukurova İdmanyurdu	Alsancak Stadium, İzmir
Sunday, 11:15	Saim Çınar 36'	Report	62' Hüseyin İlgin; 88' Faruk Yanardağ	Referee: Halil Erdoğan

17 October 1964 Round 6	Çukurova İdmanyurdu	3 – 2	Vefa	19 Mayıs Stadium, Mersin
Saturday, 15:00	Erol Yılmaz; Münür Genç; Oktay Güneri	Report

18 October 1964 Round 7	Çukurova İdmanyurdu	1 – 0	Beylerbeyi	19 Mayıs Stadium, Mersin
Sunday, 15:00	Alp Sümeralp 84'	Report

31 October 1964 Round 8	Petrolspor	1 – 3	Çukurova İdmanyurdu	Ankaragücü Stadium, Ankara
Saturday, 15:00	Kadir Aklamuz 44'	Report	35' Münür Genç; 50' Uğur Özalp; 66' Münür Genç	Referee: Özdemir Erentok

1 November 1964 Round 9	Güneşspor	1 – 2	Çukurova İdmanyurdu	Ankaragücü Stadium, Ankara
Sunday, 09:45	Rafet Çaltuğ 70' (pen.)	Report	33' Alp Sümeralp; 50' Münür Genç	Referee: Hikmet Kolankaya

7 November 1964 Round 10	Kasımpaşa	2 – 3	Çukurova İdmanyurdu	Vefa Stadium, Istanbul
Saturday, 14:30	Nazım Özertan 44'; Savaş Yarbay 61' (pen.)	Report	48' Emin Akkoç; 56' Uğur Özalp; 79' Alp Sümeralp; (penalty missed) Erol Yılmaz

8 November 1964 Round 11	Yeşildirek	0 – 0	Çukurova İdmanyurdu	Vefa Stadium, Istanbul
Sunday, 12:45		Report	(red card) 80' Münür Genç	Referee: Nuri Güneş

12 December 1964 Round 12	Beyoğluspor	1 – 1	Çukurova İdmanyurdu	Vefa Stadium, Istanbul
Saturday, 14:15	Niko Kazancıoğlu 43'	Report	7' Uğur Özalp

13 December 1964 Round 13	Karagümrük	1 – 0	Çukurova İdmanyurdu	Vefa Stadium, Istanbul
Sunday, 12:30	Cengiz Özyalçın 29'	Report

19 December 1964 Round 14	Çukurova İdmanyurdu	1 – 0	Bursaspor	19 Mayıs Stadium, Mersin
Saturday, 14:00	Erol Yılmaz 87' (pen.)	Report		Referee: Faruk Talu

20 December 1964 Round 15	Çukurova İdmanyurdu	1 – 0	Manisa Sakaryaspor	19 Mayıs Stadium, Mersin
Sunday, 14:00	Erol Yılmaz 73' (pen.)	Report		Referee: Nevzat Tansuk

Sources: 1964–65 Turkish Second Football League pages.

ÇİY finished first half of the season as leader with 22 points. Second was Beyoğluspor with 21 points. League winner Vefa finished 7th with 16 points and runner up Bursaspor 4th with 18 points. Third place Karşıyaka 19 points. 5- Karagümrük 18. 6-Ülküspor 17. 8- Sarıyer 15. 9- Kasımpaşa 15, 10- Altındağ 14. 11- Petrolspor 14. 12- Adana Demirspor 14. 13- Beylerbeyi 11. 14- Yeşildirek 11. 15- Güneşspor 10. 16- Manisa Sakaryaspor 5.

=== Mid-season ===
In the mid-season MİY played two games against national army team who camped in Mersin.

31 January 1965 1	Çukurova İdmanyurdu	2 – 2	Turkish National Army Team	City Stadium, Mersin
Sunday	Hüseyin 4'; Tarık 59'	Report	42' Ergin; 71' K.Coşkun

14 February 1965 2	Çukurova İdmanyurdu	1 – 3	Turkish National Army Team	City Stadium, Mersin
Sunday		Report

Sources: 1964–65 Turkish Second Football League pages.

=== Second half ===
Mersin İdmanyurdu (MİY) 1963–64 Second League season second half game reports is shown in the following table. Kick off times are in EET and EEST.

16 January 1965 Round 16	Çukurova İdmanyurdu	1 – 0	Karşıyaka	19 Mayıs Stadium, Mersin
Saturday, 14:00	Alp Sümeralp 22'	Report		Referee: Veli Necdet Arığ

17 January 1965 Round 17	Çukurova İdmanyurdu	3 – 1	Ülküspor	19 Mayıs Stadium, Mersin
Sunday, 14:00	Alp Sümeralp 13'; Uğur Özalp 34'; Münür Genç 40'	Report	61' (pen.) Kahraman İnan

24 January 1965 Round 18	Bursaspor	2 – 1	Çukurova İdmanyurdu	Atatürk Stadium, Bursa
Sunday, 14:00	Ahmet Konur 36'; Mesut Şen 59'	Report	29' Uğur Özalp	Referee: Cezmi Başar

7 February 1965 Round 19	Adana Demirspor	1 – 0	Çukurova İdmanyurdu	City Stadium, Adana
Sunday, 14:30	Aydın Özbay 38'	Report		Referee: Nadi Irmaklar

20 February 1965 Round 20	Çukurova İdmanyurdu	2 – 0	Kasımpaşa	City Stadium, Mersin
Saturday, 14:00	Hüseyin Rıza İlgin 7'; Alp Sümeralp 84'	Report		Referee: Macit Sarıdana

21 February 1965 Round 21	Çukurova İdmanyurdu	1 – 0	Karagümrük	City Stadium, Mersin
Sunday, 14:30	Oktay Güneri 35'	Report		Referee: Fahri Alpagut

28 February 1965 Round 22	Altındağ	0 – 1	Çukurova İdmanyurdu	Ankaragücü Stadium, Ankara
Sunday, 12:30		Report	3' Alp Sümeralp	Referee: Kemal Yavman

7 March 1965 Round 23	Manisa Sakaryaspor	0 – 0	Çukurova İdmanyurdu	City Stadium, Manisa
Sunday, 14:30		Report		Referee: Rıfat Atakanı

13 March 1965 Round 24	Çukurova İdmanyurdu	2 – 0	Yeşildirek	City Stadium, Mersin
Saturday, 14:30	Hüseyin İlgin 13'; Alp Sümeralp 80'	Report		Referee: Cihat Ergün

14 March 1965 Round 25	Çukurova İdmanyurdu	1 – 0	Petrolspor	City Stadium, Mersin
Sunday, 14:30	Hüseyin İlgin 42'	Report		Referee: Burhan Özduygu

20 March 1965 Round 26	Vefa	2 – 1	Çukurova İdmanyurdu	Mithatpaşa Stadium, Istanbul
Saturday, 13:30	Zeki Temizer 8'; Zeki Temizer 87'	Report; Note	74' Tarık Arıtan	Referee: Cezmi Başar

21 March 1964 Round 27	Sarıyer	3 – 0	Çukurova İdmanyurdu	Vefa Stadium, Istanbul
Monday, 11:00	Ruli 7' (F); Fethi Türkeş 36' (pen.); Kaya Girgin 80' (H)	Report	(red card) 85' Uğur Özalp	Referee: Hüseyin Maloğlu

27 March 1965 Round 28	Çukurova İdmanyurdu	2 – 2	Güneşspor	City Stadium, Mersin
Saturday, 14:30	Alp Sümeralp 25'; Saba 60'	Report	77' Tevfik Ünyazıcı; 82' Yavuz Peker	Referee: Ertuğrul Dilek

28 March 1965 Round 29	Çukurova İdmanyurdu	4 – 0	Beyoğluspor	City Stadium, Mersin
Sunday, 14:30	Hüseyin İlgin 56'; Faruk Yanardağ 62'; Tarık Arıtan 71'; Hüseyin İlgin 87'	Report		Referee: Sabahattin Ladikli

3 April 1965 Round 30	Beylerbeyi	1 – 0	Çukurova İdmanyurdu	Vefa Stadium, Istanbul
Saturday, 15:00	Ahmet Tanrıkulu 79'	Report

Sources: 1964–65 Turkish Second Football League pages.

== 1964–65 Turkish Cup participation ==
The third Turkish Cup was played by 67 teams: 16 First League teams, 16 Second League teams, 19 teams from regional leagues, and 16 teams from amateurs. Galatasaray won the cup for the third time and became eligible for playing ECW Cup games next year. ÇİY, being a Second League team, has participated in Cup starting from Round 2 preliminary round, and eliminated in Round 3 second preliminary round.

=== Cup track ===
The drawings and results Mersin İdmanyurdu (MİY) followed in 1964–65 Turkish Cup are shown in the following table.

Round	Own League	Opponent's League	Opponent	A/H	Score	Result
Round 2 Preliminary	Second League	Second League	Adana Demirspor	A	3–2	Promoted to R2
Round 2	Second League	Second League	Yeşildirek	H	3–0	Promoted to R3 P2
Round 3 Preliminary 2	Second League	First League	Altınordu	A	0–3	Eliminated

Note: In the above table 'Score' shows For and Against goals whether the match played at home or not.

=== Game details ===
Mersin İdmanyurdu (MİY) 1964–65 Turkish Cup game reports is shown in the following table. Kick off times are in EET and EEST.

4 October 1964 Round 2 P	Adana Demirspor	2 – 3	Çukurova İdmanyurdu	City Stadium, Adana
Sunday, 15:00		Report

25 October 1964 Round 2	Çukurova İdmanyurdu	3 – 0	Yeşildirek	City Stadium, Mersin
Sunday, 14:45		Note

9 January 1965 Round 3 P2	Altınordu	3 – 0	Çukurova İdmanyurdu	Alsancak Stadium, İzmir
Saturday		Note

Source: 1964–65 Turkish Cup pages.

== Management ==
=== Club management ===
Executive committee:

- Mehmet Karamehmet, H. M. Karamehmet, Erol Tarhan, Reşat Demir, Kemal Evrim, Kemal Kürklü, İbrahim Tinli, Edip Ergin, Halit Gazioğlu.

=== Coaching team ===
Head coach was İlhan Taşucu. Manager: Hüseyin Tinli. Trainer: Nazım Koka.

1964–65 Mersin İdmanyurdu head coaches:

Nat	Head coach	Period	Pl	W	D	L	Notes
(Turkey)	İlhan Taşucu	01.08.1964 – 31.05.1965	33	20	4	9	Left at the end of the season.

Note: Only official games were included.

== 1964–65 squad ==
Stats are counted for 1964–65 Second League matches and 1964–65 Turkish Cup (Türkiye Kupası) matches. In the team rosters four substitutes were allowed to appear, two of whom were substitutable. Only the players who appeared in game rosters were included and listed in the order of appearance.

O	N	Nat	Name	Birth	Born	Pos	LA	LG	CA	CG	TA	TG	Booked	Sent off (straight red)	← Season Notes →
1	1	(Turkey)	Rızkullah Fakkusoğlu	1944		GK	12				12				→ previous season.
2	2	(Turkey)	Muammer Yapıcı (C)	1937		DF	15				15				→ previous season.
3	3	(Turkey)	Refik Çoğum	1940		MF	19				19				
4	4	(Turkey)	Tarık Arıtan	1941		MF	15	3			15	3			
5	5	(Turkey)	Hüseyin İlgin			FW	25	7			25	7			→ previous season.
6	6	(Turkey)	Erol Yılmaz	1937		FW	15	2			15	2			1964 ST İzmirspor.
7	7	(Turkey)	Münür Genç			FW	17	5			17	5		1	
8	8	(Turkey)	Faruk Yanardağ	1942		FW	10	2			10	2			→ previous season.
9	9	(Turkey)	Oktay Güneri			MF	22	1			22	1			→ previous season.
10	10	(Turkey)	Uğur Özalp			FW	20	5			20	5		1	→ previous season.
11	11	(Turkey)	Alp Sümeralp	1938		FW	24	10			24	10			→ previous season.
12	1	(Turkey)	Doğan Ölçücü			GK	12				12				→ previous season.
13	2	(Turkey)	Emin Akkoç	1937		DF	22	1			22	1			
14	4	(Turkey)	Mehmet Diner			MF	20				20				→ previous season.
15	4	(Turkey)	Sami İlgin			MF	8				8				
16	4	(Turkey)	Uğur Özol			DF	5				5				
17	6	(Turkey)	Fehmi			MF	1				1				
18	7	(Turkey)	Roni Kumdereli	1940		FW	3				3				→ previous season.
19	4	(Turkey)	İsmet			MF	1				1				
20	9	(Turkey)	Saba			FW	1	1			1	1			

Sources: 1964–65 season squad data from maçkolik com, Milliyet, and Erbil (1975).

== See also ==
- Football in Turkey
