= 1967–68 Mersin İdmanyurdu season =

Mersin İdmanyurdu
1967–68 season
- President: Faruk Miskavi
- Coach: (Turkey) Cihat Arman
- Stadium: Mersin, Turkey
- First League: 10th
- Turkish Cup: Eliminated at R2
- Top goalscorer: (Turkey) Osman Arpacıoğlu (18)
Home colours	Away colours	Third colours

Mersin İdmanyurdu (also Mersin İdman Yurdu, Mersin İY, or MİY) Sports Club; located in Mersin, east Mediterranean coast of Turkey in 1967–68. Mersin İdmanyurdu (MİY) football team played in Turkish First Football League, the first level division for the first time in 1967–68 season. They finished tenth. In their first season they have become one of the most scorer teams. In Turkish Cup they were eliminated at second round. Before the season MİT had sent an offer to former coach of Turkish national football team Sandro Puppo. However, later Cihat Arman has signed as coach. Bayram Birinci was trainer.

Executive committee: Faruk Miskavi (president); Mehmet Karamehmet (vice-president); Mahir Turan and Ünal Çıkmaz (deputy vice-presidents); Erol Tarhan (general captain); Turgut Atasagun (general secretary); Yılmaz Ok (treasurer); Sedattin Cömert (audit); Şükrü Soydan, Mustafa Tüzmen, Sadık Eliyeşil, Halit Gazioğlu, Aydın Özlü, Necati Bilkan, Sezai Sak, Sungur Baykurt (members).

== Pre-season ==
Season was opened on 6 August 1967. Preparation games:

- 13.08.1967 - MİY-Adanaspor: 3–2. Sunday, 16:30. MİY: Goals: Tarık, Kadri, Ali.
- MİY-Hatayspor: 5–2. MİY: Goals: Tarık (3), Kahraman, Osman.
- MİY-Tarsus İdmanyurdu: 6–2. MİY: Goals: Kahraman (4), Ali, Ayhan.
- 27.08.1967 - MİY-Feriköy: 3–2. Sunday, 16:30. Mersin Stadium. MİY: Goals: Kadri 36', Tarık 48', Kahraman 89' Kahraman substituted Kadri. Feriköy: Goals: Ruli 79', Arif 13'.
- 03.09.1967 - MİY-PTT: 2–1. Sunday, 16:15. Mersin. MİY: Goals: Ali, Osman. PTT: Goals: Ertan.

== 1967–68 First League participation ==
First League was played for the tenth time in 1967–68 season with 17 teams. Last three teams relegated to Second League 1968–69. Mersin İY became tenth in its first season at top level with 12 wins, and Osman Arpacıoğlu was the most scorer player of the team with 18 goals. He also played for national team.

Cihat Arman has resigned on 27.04.1968, one day before the 30th week game. Sezai Sak managed the team against Bursaspor. Before 31st round Turgay Şeren started to manage the team.

=== Results summary ===
Mersin İdmanyurdu (MİY) 1967–68 First League summary:

	Overall									Home								Away							
Stage	Pc	Pl	W	D	L	GF	GA	GD	Pt	Pl	W	D	L	GF	GA	GD	Pt	Pl	W	D	L	GF	GA	GD	Pt
First half	10	16	7	1	8	22	23	-1	15	8	6	0	2	16	9	+7	12	8	1	1	6	6	14	-8	3
Second half		16	5	5	6	20	21	-1	15	8	4	3	1	14	8	+6	11	8	1	2	5	6	13	-7	4
Overall	10	32	12	6	14	42	44	-2	30	16	10	3	3	30	17	+13	23	16	2	3	11	12	27	-15	7

Sources: 1967–68 Turkish First Football League pages.

=== League table ===
Mersin İY's place in First League in 1967–68 season league table and game results are shown in the table below.

Pos	Team	Pld	W	D	L	GF	GA	GD	Pts
8	Gençlerbirliği	32	11	10	11	28	26	+2	32
9	Eskişehirspor	32	11	9	12	40	36	+4	31
10	Mersin İdman Yurdu	32	12	6	14	42	44	−2	30
11	Ankara Demirspor	32	8	14	10	29	33	−4	30
12	Vefa	32	8	13	11	31	35	−4	29

Rules for classification: 1) points; 2) goal difference; 3) number of goals scored.

Note: Won, drawn and lost points are 2, 1 and 0. F belongs to MİY and A belongs to corresponding team for both home and away matches. Bay weeks for MİY are shown in respective raw.

=== Results by round ===
Results of games MİY played in 1967–68 First League by rounds:

Round	1	2	3	4	5	6	7	8	9	10	11	12	13	14	15	16	17	18	19	20	21	22	23	24	25	26	27	28	29	30	31	32	33	34
Ground	H	A	H	A	A	H	A	H	A	H	B	H	A	A	H	A	H	A	H	A	H	H	A	H	A	H	A	B	A	H	H	A	H	A
Result	L	L	W	L	D	W	L	W	W	W		W	L	L	L	L	W	L	W	D	D	W	L	D	W	W	L		D	W	D	L	L	L
Position	11	16	13	14	14	11	15	10	8	5	8	4	7	11	12	12	10	12	10	10	11	9	11	11	10	8	10	10	10	7	7	10	10	10

Source: 1967–68 Turkish First Football League pages. u=14:10, 26 February 2015 (UTC)
A = Away; H = Home; B = Bye; W = Win; D = Draw; L = Loss

=== First half ===
10 September 1967 Round 1	Mersin İdmanyurdu	1 – 2	Galatasaray	Tevfik Sırrı Gür Stadium, Mersin
Sunday, 16:00	Osman Arpacıoğlu 67'	Report	7' Metin Oktay; 76' Ergün Acuner	Referee: Muzaffer Sarvan

16 September 1967 Round 2	Altınordu	2 – 1	Mersin İdmanyurdu	Alsancak Stadium, İzmir
Saturday, 16:15	Behçet Arkun 63'; Cengiz Kocatoros 80'	Report	86' Tarık Kutver	Referee: Sabahattin Ladikli

24 September 1967 Round 3	Mersin İdmanyurdu	1 – 0	Altay	Tevfik Sırrı Gür Stadium, Mersin
Sunday, 15:30	Tarık Kutver 75'; Osman Arpacıoğlu (red card) 52'	Report	(red card) 52' Enver Katip	Referee: Veli Necdet Arığ

1 October 1967 Round 4	Beşiktaş	1 – 0	Mersin İdmanyurdu	Ali Sami Yen Stadium, Istanbul
Sunday, 15:00	Sanlı Sarıalioğlu 43'; Yusuf Tunaoğlu (red card) 41'	Report	(red card) 44' Tarık Arıtan	Referee: Sabahattin Ladikli

8 October 1967 Round 5	Eskişehirspor	2 – 2	Mersin İdmanyurdu	Atatürk Stadium, Eskişehir
Sunday, 15:00	Nihat Atacan 37'; Fethi Heper 54'	Report	17' Ali Açıkgöz; 74' Osman Arpacıoğlu	Referee: Faruk Talu

15 October 1967 Round 6	Mersin İdmanyurdu	3 – 1	Vefa	Tevfik Sırrı Gür Stadium, Mersin
Sunday, 15:00	Osman Arpacıoğlu 17'; Osman Arpacıoğlu 46'; Ayhan Öz (penalty missed) 52'; Ali Açıkgöz 87'	Report	85' Zeki Temizer	Referee: Orhan Gönül

21 October 1967 Round 7	Göztepe	3 – 0	Mersin İdmanyurdu	Alsancak Stadium, İzmir
Saturday, 15:00	Nevzat Güzelırmak 43'; Fevzi Zemzem 55'; Gürsel Aksel 85'	Report		Referee: Zeki Gürkan

29 October 1967 Round 8	Mersin İdmanyurdu	1 – 0	Ankaragücü	Tevfik Sırrı Gür Stadium, Mersin
Sunday, 15:00	Ayhan Öz 62'	Report		Referee: Sedat Özselçuk

4 November 1967 Round 9	Feriköy	0 – 1	Mersin İdmanyurdu	Mithatpaşa Stadium, Istanbul
Saturday, 14:30		Report	65' Tarık Kutver; (red card) 85' Mustafa Aksoy	Referee: Mazhar Kerestecioğlu

12 November 1967 Round 10	Mersin İdmanyurdu	3 – 1	Şekerspor	Tevfik Sırrı Gür Stadium, Mersin
Sunday, 14:45	Tarık Kutver 50'; Osman Arpacıoğlu 56'; Tarık Kutver 66' (pen.)	Report	87' Fahrettin Keçeci	Referee: Doğan Babacan

19 November 1967 Round 11	BYE	v	Mersin İdmanyurdu
Sunday

3 December 1967 Round 12	Mersin İdmanyurdu	2 – 1	PTT	Tevfik Sırrı Gür Stadium, Mersin
Sunday, 14:00	Ayhan Öz 16'; Ali Açıkgöz 79'	Report	75' Ertan Adatepe	Referee: Ömer Karadağ

10 December 1867 Round 13	Bursaspor	2 – 1	Mersin İdmanyurdu	Atatürk Stadium, Bursa
Sunday, 13:45	Ljubiša Stefanović 38'; Ergun Öztuna 85'; İrfan Rubacı (red card) 43'	Report	18' Ali Açıkgöz; (red card) 43' Osman Arpacıoğlu; (red card) 86' Refik Çoğum	Referee: Cezmi Başar

16 December 1967 Round 14	Ankara Demirspor	3 – 1	Mersin İdmanyurdu	19 Mayıs Stadium, Ankara
Saturday, 12:15	Vural Yılmaz 22'; Timuçin Çığ 42'; Birol Aşar 55' (pen.); Nejat Belit (red card) 51'	Report	47' İhsan Temen; (red card) 51' Yalçın Saner	Referee: Hakkı Çaktırma

24 December 1967 Round 15	Mersin İdmanyurdu	3 – 4	Hacettepe	Tevfik Sırrı Gür Stadium, Mersin
Sunday, 15:00	Kahraman İnan 26'; Kahraman İnan 34'; Kahraman İnan 57'	Report	9' Kökten Baytaroğlu; 15' İhsan Gümüş; 28' Suphi Arabul; 41' İhsan Gümüş	Referee: Nejat Şener

31 December 1967 Round 16	Fenerbahçe	1 – 0	Mersin İdmanyurdu	Mithatpaşa Stadium, Istanbul
Sunday, 14:00	Ziya Şengül 13'	Report		Attendance: 26.721; Referee: Necdet Oralalp

7 January 1968 Round 17	Mersin İdmanyurdu	2 – 0	Gençlerbirliği	Tevfik Sırrı Gür Stadium, Mersin
Sunday, 14:00	Tarık Kutver 44'; Osman Arpacıoğlu 70'	Report		Referee: Zeki Gürkan

=== Mid-season ===
Friendly game:

- 20.01.1968 - Feriköy-MİY.

=== Second half ===
4 February 1968 Round 18	Galatasaray	3 – 0	Mersin İdmanyurdu	Mithatpaşa Stadium, Istanbul
Sunday, 12:45	Ayhan Elmastaşoğlu 50' (F); Ayhan Elmastaşoğlu 53' (F); Ayhan Elmastaşoğlu 59' (F)	Report		Referee: Orhan Gönül

11 February 1968 Round 19	Mersin İdmanyurdu	5 – 1	Altınordu	Tevfik Sırrı Gür Stadium, Mersin
Sunday, 14:15	Kadri Aytaç 20'; Osman Arpacıoğlu 25'; Tarık Kutver 47' (pen.); Osman Arpacıoğlu 60'; Osman Arpacıoğlu 89'	Report	74' Bahri Altıntabak	Referee: Veli Necdet Arığ

18 February 1968 Round 20	Altay	1 – 1	Mersin İdmanyurdu	Alsancak Stadium, İzmir
Sunday, 13:00	Ender İçten 46'	Report	50' Mustafa Aksoy	Referee: Ziya Türkdoğan

25 February 1968 Round 21	Mersin İdmanyurdu	0 – 0	Beşiktaş	Tevfik Sırrı Gür Stadium, Mersin
Sunday, 14:30		Report		Attendance: 25.000; Referee: Necdet Oralalp

3 March 1968 Round 22	Mersin İdmanyurdu	2 – 1	Eskişehirspor	Tevfik Sırrı Gür Stadium, Mersin
Sunday, 14:30	Ayhan Öz 11'; Osman Arpacıoğlu 39'	Report	35' Burhan İpek	Referee: Nevzat Tansuk

10 March 1968 Round 23	Vefa	2 – 0	Mersin İdmanyurdu	Mithatpaşa Stadium, Istanbul
Sunday, 13:00	Zeki Temizer 28'; Zeki Temizer 49'; Jovan Savić (red card) 30'	Report		Referee: Ertuğrul Dilek

17 March 1968 Round 24	Mersin İdmanyurdu	1 – 1	Göztepe	Tevfik Sırrı Gür Stadium, Mersin
Sunday, 14:30	Osman Arpacıoğlu 29'	Report	56' Nihat Yayöz	Referee: Faruk Talu

23 March 1968 Round 25	Ankaragücü	0 – 1	Mersin İdmanyurdu	19 Mayıs Stadium, Ankara
Saturday, 14:30		Report	50' Osman Arpacıoğlu	Referee: Ömer Karadağ

31 March 1968 Round 26	Mersin İdmanyurdu	2 – 1	Feriköy	Tevfik Sırrı Gür Stadium, Mersin
Sunday, 14:30	Ayhan Öz 84'; Osman Arpacıoğlu 90' (pen.)	Report	87' Zekeriya Alp	Referee: (Bulgaria) Todor Betchirov

6 April 1968 Round 27	Şekerspor	2 – 1	Mersin İdmanyurdu	19 Mayıs Stadium, Ankara
Saturday, 13:00	Doğan Yiğit 18'; Erol Boralı 60' (pen.)	Report	80' Ayhan Öz	Referee: Sedat Özselçuk

14 April 1968 Round 28	Mersin İdmanyurdu	v	BYE
Sunday

21 April 1968 Round 29	PTT	0 – 0	Mersin İdmanyurdu	19 Mayıs Stadium, Ankara
Sunday, 13:15		Report		Referee: Yavuz Tunç

28 April 1968 Round 30	Mersin İdmanyurdu	2 – 1	Bursaspor	Tevfik Sırrı Gür Stadium, Mersin
Sunday, 15:00	Osman Arpacıoğlu 6'; Osman Arpacıoğlu 26' (pen.)	Report	32' Taner Çığıraç	Referee: Necdet Oralalp

5 May 1968 Round 31	Mersin İdmanyurdu	1 – 1	Ankara Demirspor	Tevfik Sırrı Gür Stadium, Mersin
Sunday, 15:30	Osman Arpacıoğlu 64'; Tarık Kutver (red card) 66'	Report	13' Sedat Boğaz	Referee: Orhan Gönül

11 May 1968 Round 32	Hacettepe	3 – 2	Mersin İdmanyurdu	19 Mayıs Stadium, Ankara
Saturday, 15:30	İhsan Gümüş 16'; İhsan Gümüş 57'	Report	45' Kadri Aytaç; 61' Osman Arpacıoğlu; 90' (o.g.) Refik Çoğum	Referee: (Switzerland) Roland Marendaz

19 May 1968 Round 33	Mersin İdmanyurdu	1 – 2	Fenerbahçe	Tevfik Sırrı Gür Stadium, Mersin
Sunday, 16:00	Osman Arpacıoğlu 15'; Refik Çoğum 57' (o.g.)	Report	7' Yaşar Mumcuoğlu; (red card) Yılmaz Şen	Referee: Mazhar Kerestecioğlu

25 May 1968 Round 34	Gençlerbirliği	2 – 1	Mersin İdmanyurdu	19 Mayıs Stadium, Ankara
Saturday, 15:30	Temel Keskindemir 50'; Hayrettin Endersert 87'	Report	78' Alp Sümeralp	Referee: Sedat Özselçuk

== 1967–68 Turkish Cup participation ==
1967–68 Turkish Cup was played for the sixth season as Türkiye Kupası by 31 teams. Two elimination rounds (including one preliminary round) and finals were played in two-legs elimination system. Mersin İdmanyurdu participated in 1967–68 Turkish Cup from the first round and was eliminated at second round by Fenerbahçe. Fenerbahçe won the Cup for the first time.

=== Cup track ===
The drawings and results Mersin İdmanyurdu (MİY) followed in 1967–68 Turkish Cup are shown in the following table.

Round	Own League	Opponent's League	Opponent	A	H	Result
Round 1	First League	Amateur	İzmir Denizgücü	1–0	3–0	Promoted to R2
Round 2	First League	First League	Fenerbahçe	1–2	0–0	Eliminated

Note: In the above table 'Score' shows For and Against goals whether the match played at home or not.

=== Game details ===
Mersin İdmanyurdu (MİY) 1967–68 Turkish Cup game reports is shown in the following table. Kick off times are in EET and EEST.

25 October 1968 Round 1 Leg 1	İzmir Denizgücü	0 – 1	Mersin İdmanyurdu	Alsancak Stadium, İzmir
Wednesday, 13:00		Report	70' Ayhan Öz	Referee: Halil Erdoğan

19 November 1968 Round 1 Leg 2	Mersin İdmanyurdu	3 – 0	İzmir Denizgücü	Tevfik Sırrı Gür Stadium, Mersin
Sunday, 14:00	Kahraman İnan 25'; Kahraman İnan 49'; Alp Sümeralp 74'	Report		Referee: Nadi Irmaklar

21 January 1968 Round 2 Leg 1	Mersin İdmanyurdu	0 – 0	Fenerbahçe	Tevfik Sırrı Gür Stadium, Mersin
Sunday, 14:00		Report		Referee: Veli Necdet Arığ

28 January 1968 Round 2 Leg 2	Fenerbahçe	2 – 1	Mersin İdmanyurdu	Mithatpaşa Stadium, Istanbul
Sunday, 14:00	Nedim Doğan 20'; Fuat Saner 68'	Report	48' (pen.) Yılmaz Şen	Attendance: 20.420; Referee: Sabahattin Ladikli

Source: 1967–68 Turkish Cup pages.

== Management ==
=== Club management ===
Faruk Miskavi was club president.

=== Coaching team ===
1967–68 Mersin İdmanyurdu head coaches:

Nat	Head coach	Period	Pl	W	D	L	Notes
(Turkey)	Cihat Arman	01.08.1967 – 31.05.1968					

Note: Only official games were included.

== 1967–68 squad ==
Stats are counted for 1967–68 First League matches and 1967–68 Turkish Cup (Türkiye Kupası) matches. In the team rosters four substitutes were allowed to appear, two of whom were substitutable. Only the players who appeared in game rosters were included and listed in the order of appearance.

O	N	Nat	Name	Birth	Born	Pos	LA	LG	CA	CG	TA	TG	Booked	Sent off (straight red)	← Season Notes →
1	1	(Turkey)	Yunus Ceyhan	1941		GK	21		1		22				1967 ST Ankaragücü.
2	2	(Turkey)	Yalçın Saner	1938		DF	23		2		25			1	1967 ST İstanbulspor.
3	3	(Turkey)	Halim Kütükçüoğlu	1938		DF	29		3		32				1967 ST Ankaragücü.
4	4	(Turkey)	İhsan Temen	1938		DF	30	1	4		34	1			→ previous season.
5	5	(Turkey)	Refik Çoğum	1940		MF	31		4		35			1	→ previous season.
6	6	(Turkey)	Ali Açıkgöz	1945	Istanbul	FW	28	4	4		32	4			1967 ST Vefa.
7	7	(Turkey)	Burhan Gürel	1943		FW	13				13				1967 ST Karşıyaka.
8	8	(Turkey)	Tarık Kutver	1940	Ezine	FW	22	7	3		25	7		1	1967 ST Galatasaray.
9	9	(Turkey)	Kadri Aytaç (C)	6 Aug 1931	Istanbul	FW	31	2	4		35	2			→ previous season.
10	10	(Turkey)	Osman Arpacıoğlu	5 Jan 1947	Ankara	FW	29	18	4		33	18		1	→ previous season.
11	11	(Turkey)	Ayhan Öz	20 Jul 1945	Mersin	FW	30	5	3	1	33	6			→ previous season.
12	11	(Turkey)	Alp Sümeralp	1938	Istanbul	FW	21	1	3	1	24	2			→ previous season.
13	5	(Turkey)	Tarık Arıtan	1939		MF	7		1		8			1	→ previous season.
14	10	(Turkey)	Kahraman İnan	1943		FW	9	3	2	2	11	5			1967 ST Ülküspor.
15	14	(Turkey)	Mustafa Aksoy	1942		MF	15	1	2		17	1			→ previous season.
16	15	(Turkey)	Abdullah Turgut	1943		FW	8		1		9				1967 ST Altındağ.
17	1	(Turkey)	Fikret Özdil	1943		GK	14		3		17				→ previous season.
18	13	(Turkey)	Battal Toktay	1939	Istanbul	DF	17		3		20				→ previous season.
19	13	(Turkey)	Fikri Pehlivan	1948		DF	1		1		2				1967 ST Davutpaşa.
20	8	(Pakistan)	Maula Bakhsh	1947	Karachi	FW	2				2				1967 ST Pakistan.
21	9	(Pakistan)	Abdul Jabbar	1945	Karachi	FW	2				2				1967 ST Pakistan.

Sources: 1967–68 season squad data from maçkolik com, Milliyet, and Erbil (1975).

Transfer information from Milliyet:

- Transfers in (Summer 1967): Tarık Kutver (Galatasaray); Yetim Ali (Vefa); Yalçın (İstanbulspor); İhsan (Gençlerbirliği); Yunus, Halim (Ankaragücü); Kahraman (Ülküspor); Burhan (Karşıyaka); Abdullah (Altındağ); Ahmet (İzmir Egespor); Fikri (Davutpaşa); Mehmet (Tirespor); Adem (İstanbul Tekel). Molla Bachs and Abdül Cabbar (PAK) became the first foreign transfers of MİY (06.04.1968). Ogün (Beşiktaş) did also sign but later withdrew.
- Transfer out (December 1967): Nihat (Boluspor). Transfers out (Summer 1968): Yalçın (İstanbulspor); Yunus (Şekerspor); K.Tarık (Sakaryaspor). Doğan (Adana Demirspor). Mustafa, Mümtaz (Adanaspor). Fikri (Antalyaspor). Adem (Kayserispor). Kahraman (Manisaspor). Battal (Boluspor).

== See also ==
- Football in Turkey
