= Yaşa Fenerbahçe =

2021 song by Nesrin Sipahi

Song by Nesrin Sipahi
- Language: Turkish
- Released: 1974
- Genre: March
- Songwriter: Fecri Ebcioğlu

"Yaşa Fenerbahçe" or "Viva Fenerbahçe" (also known as the "Anthem of Fenerbahçe" or the "Fenerbahçe March"; Turkish: Fenerbahçe Marşı), is the official anthem of Fenerbahçe. The official recorded 1974 version of the anthem by Nesrin Sipahi is mandatorily played and sung in the home stadium before every match, regardless of the branch. It was written by Fenerbahçe's former goalkeeper Fecri Ebcioğlu.

== Content ==
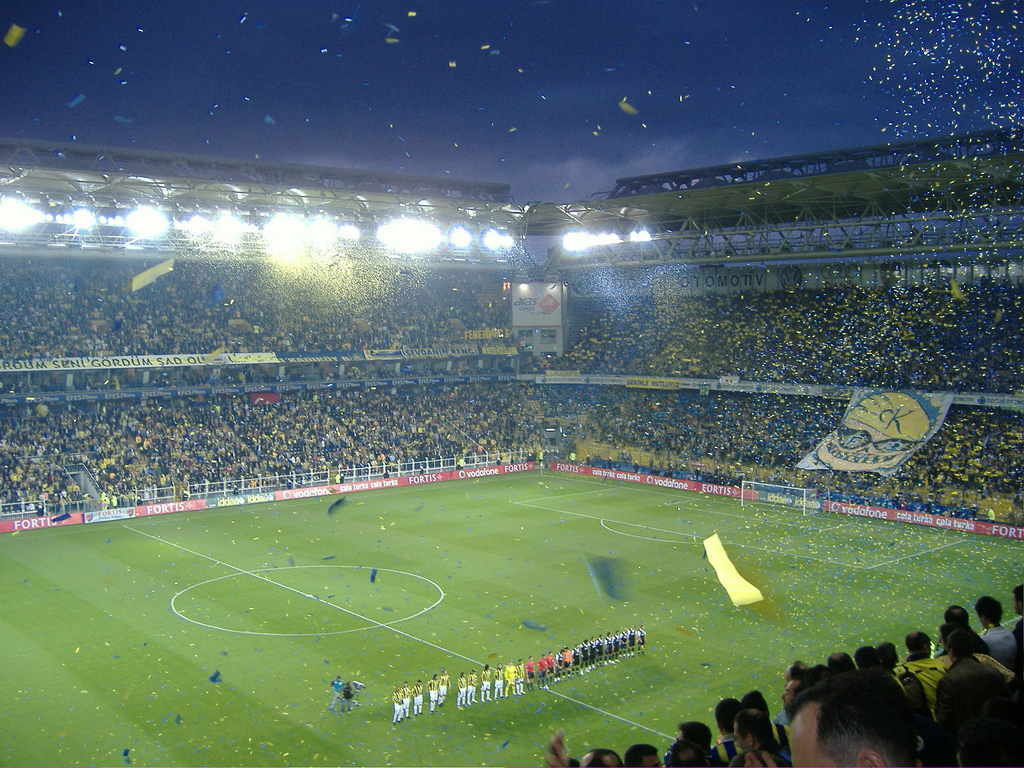
The team preparing to sing Yaşa Fenerbahçe

In 1974, Fenerbahçe had won four cups only in football, and many more in other branches. In honor of this, an official team anthem was recorded. It was mainly sung by Nesrin Sipahi, but the team coach Didi along with the 1973-1974 squad was also among the singers. The anthem talks about the unmatched legendary status of Fenerbahçe, and some of its legendary players, with the line "Cihatlar, Lefterler, Canlar, Fikretler" being a reference to Cihat Arman, Lefter Küçükandonyadis, Can Bartu, Fikret Kırcan and Fikret Arıcan.

== Lyrics ==
Turkish

Kalpleri fetheden renkler,
Yaşa Fenerbahçe!
Türkün kalbi senle atar,
Yaşa Fenerbahçe!
Mazinde bir tarih yatar,
Yaşa Fenerbahçe!
Ne mutlu seni sevene,
Yaşa Fenerbahçe!

Cihatlar, Lefterler, Canlar, Fikretler,
Hala sevilen birer abidedirler,
Hiç bir kulüpte olmayan bu dostluk,
Yıllar yılı hep şampiyon olduk.

Kalpleri fetheden renkler,
Yaşa Fenerbahçe!
Türkün kalbi senle atar
Yaşa Fenerbahçe!
Mazinde bir tarih yatar,
Yaşa Fenerbahçe!
Ne mutlu seni sevene,
Yaşa Fenerbahçe!

Maç yaparken sahada sarı kanaryalar,
Rakip takıma krampon toplatırlar,
Sıkı dur karşı defans Fener geliyor,
Şut ve gol ağları deliyor.

Kalpleri fetheden renkler,
Yaşa Fenerbahçe!
Türkün kalbi senle atar
Yaşa Fenerbahçe!
Mazinde bir tarih yatar,
Yaşa Fenerbahçe!
Ne mutlu seni sevene,
Yaşa Fenerbahçe!

English

The colors that conquered hearts,
Long shall you live, Fenerbahçe!
The Turkish heart beats with you,
Long shall you live, Fenerbahçe!
There is such a rich history in your past,
Long shall you live, Fenerbahçe!
How happy the one who loves you,
Long shall you live, Fenerbahçe!

Cihats, Lefters, Cans, Fikrets,
They are still precious, loved ones,
This comradeship that does not exist in any other club,
Will lead us to championship year after year.

The colors that conquered hearts,
Long shall you live, Fenerbahçe!
The Turkish heart beats with you,
Long shall you live, Fenerbahçe!
There is such a rich history in your past,
Long shall you live, Fenerbahçe!
How happy is the one who loves you,
Long shall you live, Fenerbahçe!

When the Yellow Canaries are out there in the field,
They absolutely humiliate the opponent team,
You better hold tight, opponent defender, Fener is coming,
Shoot and goal! Pierces the net.

The colors that conquered hearts,
Long shall you live, Fenerbahçe!
The Turkish heart beats with you,
Long shall you live, Fenerbahçe!
There is such a rich history in your past,
Long shall you live, Fenerbahçe!
How happy is the one who loves you,
Long shall you live, Fenerbahçe!

== 100th Anniversary Anthem ==
"Yaşa Fenerbahçe"

Song by Kıraç
- Language: Turkish
- Released: 2007
- Genre: March
- Songwriter: Kıraç

Yüzüncü Yıl Marşı was the anthem composed for the 100th anniversary of Fenerbahçe by Kıraç. It is also frequently used in the Fenerbahçe venues.

=== Lyrics ===
Turkish

Sen bir nefes aldığım her an
Sen bir özlem içimde hep buram buram
Kimse anlamaz bende aşkını
Sen, bir çocuk gülen yerinde durmayan

Aşkınla coşkunla sen çok yaşa
Yükseliyor bayrağın arşa
Aşkınla coşkunla sen çok yaşa
Yazdık büyük ismini dağa taşa
Yüzyıl önce doğdu şanlı efsane
Yüz yaşında mutlu ol Fenerbahçe

Kalbim senin, seninle çarpıyor
Bir tek seninle gülüp senle ağlıyor
Sen gönlümün eşsiz aşkısın
Her yerde her zaman yanıp parıldıyor

Aşkınla coşkunla sen çok yaşa
Yükseliyor bayrağın arşa
Aşkınla coşkunla sen çok yaşa
Yazdık büyük ismini dağa taşa
Yüzyıl önce doğdu şanlı efsane
Yüz yaşında mutlu ol Fenerbahçe

English

You, every moment I breathe,
You, always a burning desire inside of me!
No one can understand my love for you,
You are like a child smiling, restless!

Long live with your love and enthusiasm,
Your flag is rising as high as the heavens!
Long live with your love and enthusiasm,
We wrote your mighty name on mountains and stones!
The glorious legend was born a hundred years ago,
Be happy at a hundred years old Fenerbahçe!

My heart is yours, it beats thanks to you,
It laughs and cries with you alone!
You are the only love of my heart,
You're always shining everywhere, everytime!

Long live with your love and enthusiasm,
Your flag is rising as high as the heavens!
Long live with your love and enthusiasm,
We wrote your mighty name on mountains and stones!
The glorious legend was born a hundred years ago,
Be happy at a hundred years old Fenerbahçe!
