= Koço Kasapoğlu =

Greek-Turkish footballer and manager

Personal information
- Date of birth: November 15, 1935
- Place of birth: Istanbul, Turkey
- Date of death: 5 April 2016 (aged 80)
- Place of death: Istanbul, Turkey
- Height: 1.71 m (5 ft 7 in)
- Position: Forward

Youth career
- 1950–1953: Adalarspor
- 1953–1954: Beyoğlu S.K.

Senior career*
Years	Team	Apps	(Gls)
1954–1956	Beyoğlu S.K.	36	(10)
1956–1972	İstanbulspor A.Ş.	386	(76)

International career^{‡}
1956	Turkey	1	(0)
1957	Turkey B	1	(0)

Managerial career
- 1972–1973: Taksim S.K.
- * Club domestic league appearances and goals as of 22 January 2018 ‡ National team caps and goals as of 22 January 2018

Koço Kasapoğlu (Greek: Κώστας Κασάπογλου; 15 November 1935 – 5 April 2016), also known as Yorgo or Kostas Kasapoğlu, was a Greek-Turkish football player and manager. A forward, throughout his career he was also nicknamed penaltı kralı (in English Penalty King) because he scored 500 of the 501 penalties he took in his career and is considered the best penalty taker in Turkish football history.

== Club career ==
Kasapoğlu played for Beyoğluspor, İstanbul S.A.Ş. and Vefa SK, and was considered one of the most iconic captains of İstanbulspors history,

== International career ==
He capped for Turkey for once on 25 November 1956 in Praha in a 1–1 tie against Czechoslovakia. He also played for Turkey B national football team.

== Death ==
Kasapoğlu died on 5 April 2016, at the age of 80. He remained a lifelong fan of İstanbulspor A.Ş.
