= Kadri Aytaç =

Turkish footballer and manager

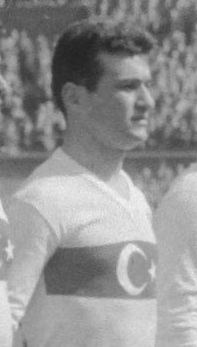

Personal information
- Date of birth: 6 August 1931
- Place of birth: Istanbul, Turkey
- Date of death: 28 March 2003 (aged 71)
- Place of death: Turkey; Buried in Feriköy Cemetery, Istanbul
- Height: 1.78 m (5 ft 10 in)
- Position: Right midfielder

Senior career*
Years	Team	Apps	(Gls)
1944–51	Beyoğluspor		
1951–58	Galatasaray	87	(45)
1958–60	Karagümrük	64	(25)
1960–62	Fenerbahçe	53	(10)
1962–67	Galatasaray	94	(19)
1967–69	Mersin İdmanyurdu	53	(3)

International career
1953–62	Turkey	26	(0)

Managerial career
- 1967–68: Mersin İdmanyurdu
- 1970–71: Denizlispor
- 1971–72: Boluspor
- 1972–73: Orduspor
- 1973–75: Tirespor
- 1975–77: Mersin İdmanyurdu
- 1977: Rizespor
- 1978–79: Ankaragücü
- 1979–80: Göztepe
- 1981–82: Kayserispor
- 1982–83: Gençlerbirliği
- 1987–88: Gençlerbirliği
- 1989–90: Karşıyaka
- 1992: Zeytinburnuspor
- 1992–93: Mersin İdmanyurdu
- 1994–95: İstanbulspor
- 1996: Kartalspor
- 1997: Nişantaşıspor
- * Club domestic league appearances and goals

Kadri Aytaç (6 August 1931 – 28 March 2003) was a Turkish football player and then manager. He played for the Beyoğluspor, Karagümrük, Galatasaray, Fenerbahçe and Mersin İdmanyurdu teams. He is the manager with the most titles earned in the Turkish Second Football League, having in the process promoted four teams to the Turkish First Football League.

== Playing career ==
In the 1958–59 season, Aytaç was the first expensive transfer, when he was transferred from Galatasaray to Karagümrük for TL 57.000. On 25 February 1959, he made the first penalty kick in Karagümrük-Vefa match and became the first player who missed a penalty in Turkish first division started in 1959. During his playing career, he won league title for two times in 1961 with Fenerbahçe and in 1963 with Galatasaray.

Aytaç was capped in Turkey national football team for 26 times.

He was among the captains of Mersin idmanyurdu football team. In 1966–67 he was transferred to second-division team Mersin İdmanyurdu which won promotion to first division at the end of that season. He played for Mersin İdmanyurdu in the 1967–68 and 1968–69 seasons in the first division, Turkish First Football League. After the 1968–69 season, he gave up professional football. In his jubilee match, Mersin İdmanyurdu played against a celebrities' team.

== Manager career ==
After his player career Kadri Aytaç started his manager career. In the 1968–69 season, he was the manager of Mersin İdmanyurdu youth team when he was playing in A team. Before the start of the 1969–70 season, Kadri Aytaç became the technical advisor of Mersin İdmanyurdu and look for foreign transfers. Later he attended a course in Romania. Later in that season Aytaç became the manager of Denizlispor, then second division team. He managed Mersin İdmanyurdu in the 1975–76, 1976–77 and 1992–93 seasons. In 1975–76, he made Mersin İdmanyurdu champions in second division, Turkish Second Football League. In 1976–77, Mersin İdmanyurdu became 7th of First League. In 1992–93, Mersin İdmanyurdu was 5th of the promotion group of Second League.

Among the teams he managed other than Mersin İdmanyurdu are, Orduspor, Gençlerbirliği, İstanbulspor, Tirespor, Rizespor, Kayserispor, Ankaragücü, and Karşıyaka. He helped Mersin İdmanyurdu, Orduspor, Gençlerbirliği and İstanbulspor promote to First League. Under his management Tirespor promoted to second league and then became 3rd in second league next year. He lastly managed Nişantaşıspor in 1997

== Personal ==
He was married to Akgül and had a daughter, Güngör. He died at age 71 due to Alzheimer's disease from which he suffered in the last five years of his life. He rests at the Feriköy Cemetery.
