= Christos Iakovou =

Greek weightlifter (born 1948)

Personal information
- Nationality: Greek
- Born: 12 April 1948 (age 77) Istanbul, Turkey

Sport
- Sport: Weightlifting

Christos Iakovou (Greek: Χρήστος Ιακώβου; born 12 April 1948) is a Greek weightlifter. He competed at the 1968, 1972 and 1976 Summer Olympics. He was named the 1975 Greek Male Athlete of the Year.

He later became the chief trainer of the Greek national weightlifting team, presiding over a string of successes in the 1992, 1996, 2000 and 2004 Summer Olympics, with athletes such as Pyrros Dimas, Valerios Leonidis, and Kakhi Kakhiashvili. He resigned in 2008 after 11 out of 14 athletes in the national team tested positive in a surprise anti-doping inspection.
