= Fecri Ebcioğlu =

Background information
- Born: 2 March 1927; Istanbul, Turkey
- Died: 6 March 1989 (aged 62) Istanbul, Turkey
- Genres: Pop
- Occupation(s): Composer, singer, lyrics writer
- Years active: 1961–1970
- Labels: Regal

Fecri Ebcioğlu (2 March 1927 – 6 March 1989) was a Turkish songwriter, composer, music arranger, DJ, singer and former goalkeeper of Fenerbahçe.
