= Lefter Küçükandonyadis =

Turkish footballer (1924–2012)

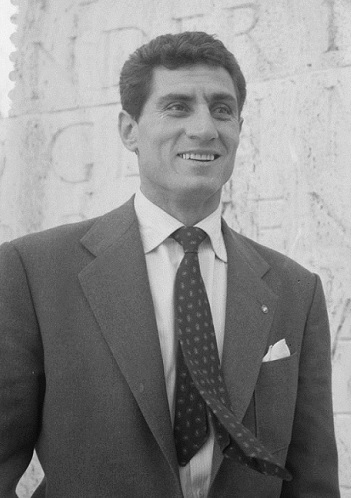
- Lefter in 1958

Personal information
- Date of birth: 22 December 1924
- Place of birth: Büyükada, Istanbul, Turkey
- Date of death: 13 January 2012 (aged 87)
- Place of death: Şişli, Istanbul, Turkey
- Height: 1.69 m (5 ft 7 in)
- Position: Inside left

Youth career
- 1938–1941: Taksim

Senior career*
| Years | Team | Apps | (Gls) |
| 1941–1943 | Taksim | 29 | (9) |
| 1947–1951 | Fenerbahçe | 55 | (38) |
| 1951–1952 | Fiorentina | 29 | (4) |
| 1952–1953 | Nice | 12 | (2) |
| 1953–1964 | Fenerbahçe | 245 | (140) |
| 1964–1965 | AEK Athens | 5 | (2) |
| 1967–1968 | Boluspor | 13 | (2) |
| Total | | 388 | (197) |

International career
| 1943 | Turkey U21 | 3 | (1) |
| 1947 | Turkey B | 1 | (0) |
| 1948–1963 | Turkey | 46 | (21) |

Managerial career
- 1963–1964: Egaleo
- 1965–1966: Johannesburg
- 1966–1967: Çukurova İdman Yurdu
- 1967: Samsunspor
- 1967–1968: Orduspor
- 1968–1969: Mersin İdman Yurdu
- 1969–1970: Boluspor
- 1970: Samsunspor
- 1970–1971: Sivasspor
- 1972: Samsunspor
- * Club domestic league appearances and goals

Lefter Küçükandonyadis (Greek: Λευτέρης Αντωνιάδης, Lefteris Antoniadis; 22 December 1924 – 13 January 2012) was a Turkish professional footballer of Greek origin who played as a forward. He is often recognized as one of the greatest strikers to play for Fenerbahçe and Turkey. Having won several regional and national championship titles with Fenerbahçe and becoming Turkish top scorer twice in his career, he left an imprint on the history of the club. Lefter is one of a few players whose names are included in the Fenerbahçe Anthem. He was named "Ordinaryus" (professor of professors) in Turkey.

== Club career ==
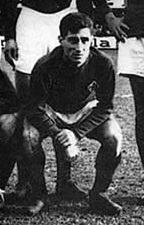
Lefter playing for Fiorentina

Lefter started his footballing career on Büyükada (an island in Istanbul) but professionally played first with Taksim SK, a club based in the European part of Istanbul.

He was transferred to Fenerbahçe in 1947, achieving instant success. He won the National Division championship in 1950, his first nationwide championship title with the club, becoming the Turkish top scorer in the same edition.

He was one of the first Turkish footballers to play abroad, playing during 1951–1953 for Fiorentina in Italy and OGC Nice in France. Returning to Fenerbahçe, he won two Istanbul League titles and later, after the start of the Turkish Super League, three Turkish League (1959, 1961 and 1964) titles.

In the 1947–48 and 1953–54 seasons, he became the leading goalscorer of the Istanbul League. On 31 October 1963, Küçükandonyadis also took charge of Greek club Egaleo as manager for six months, travelling between Istanbul and Athens to fulfil his commitments with both clubs. In November 1963 he returned to Istanbul after a match of Egaleo against Olympiacos in order to participate in the jubilee match of Fenerbahçe against Galatasaray, before returning to Athens. Despite his managerial commitments in Greece, he made eight league appearances for Fenerbahçe scoring two goals, throughout the season. Overall, he scored a total of 423 goals in 615 games for Fenerbahçe.

In August 1964 he left Turkey and moved to Greece where he signed for AEK Athens. He scored twice in an away 7–1 victory against Apollon Smyrnis and became the oldest goalscorer in the history of the club. These goals also made his the oldest goalscorer in the history of Greek championship, until Tasos Mitropoulos surpassed him in 1997. He played in only five matches in the season, as an injury in the match against Iraklis forced him to retire.

== International career ==
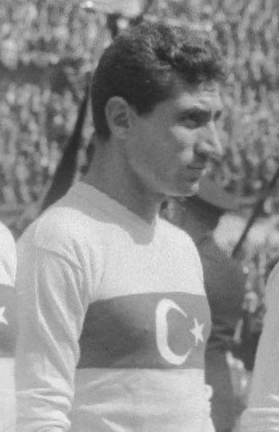
Lefter in 1958

Küçükandonyadis was capped 46 times for the Turkey national team, 9 as the captain. He also played at the 1948 Summer Olympics, and the 1954 FIFA World Cup netting in two goals, one against West Germany and the other against South Korea. He scored 21 goals for the national team and was the top scorer for Turkey until overtaken by Hakan Şükür. He was the first Turkish football player to receive the "Golden Honor Medal" from the Turkish Football Federation for having played for the national selection in 50 international matches.

== Managerial career ==
On 30 October 1963, Küçükandonyadis, while still playing for Fenerbahçe, started his managerial career, as he moved to Greece to take charge of Egaleo. The following day he signed a six-month contract with the club. His appointment was initially intended to be as a manager, although Egaleo also expressed interest in using him as a player-manager. He conducted his first training session with the team on 1 November 1963, taking responsibility for the preparation of both the senior and reserve teams. On 30 April 1964, Küçükandonyadis left Egaleo and returned to Istanbul.

In 1965, he coached Johannesburg in South Africa. He later returned to Turkey to coach clubs, mostly Samsunspor, Orduspor, Mersin İdman Yurdu, and Boluspor.

== Personal life ==
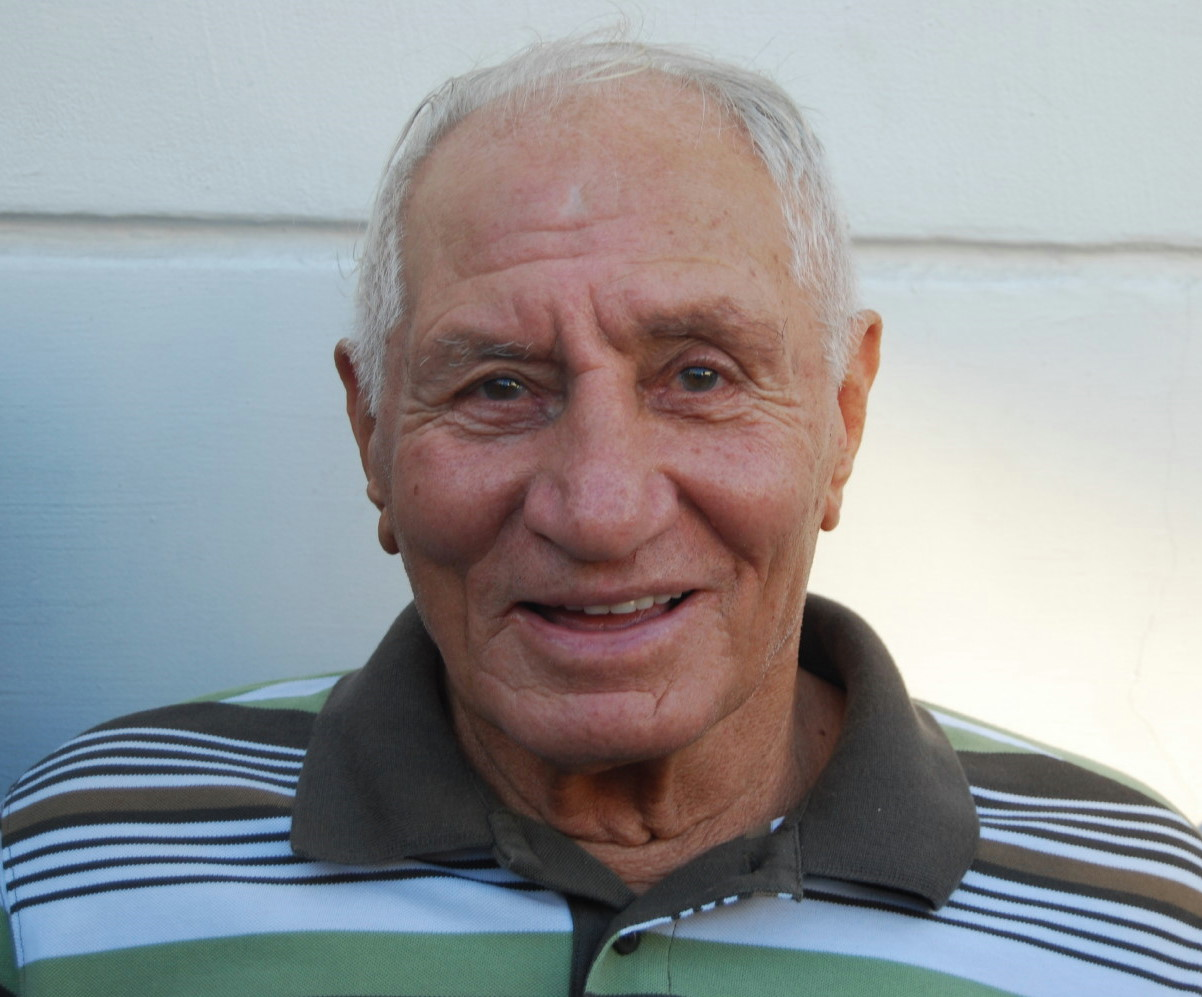
Küçükandonyadis in 2009

Both of his parents were of Greek origin, Christofis Antoniadis, a fisherman, and Argyro Antoniadis, a tailor, who had immigrated from Ottoman Albania to the island of Büyükada in Istanbul in the early 20th century. He grew up with ten brothers and sisters, and had a Greek Orthodox upbringing. One of his brothers, Panagis Antoniadis, played for Pera Club. His family took part in the exodus of ethnic Greeks from Turkey during his childhood – except for his father. Due to his small stature, the Turks gave him the nickname Küçük, Turkish for "The Small", and Lefter added it to his surname – Küçükandonyadis, meaning "The Small Antoniadis". He was married to a fellow Greek woman, Stavriani Bekiari, and they had three children.

== Discrimination ==
Lefter, as a Greek, faced a lot of discrimination in Turkey. In 1942, his relatives were targeted by the discriminatory Varlik Vergisi ("Wealth Tax") and forced to migrate to Greece. His father was spared because he had no property. In 1955, Lefter's house was stoned and splashed with paint during the Istanbul pogrom. Attackers tried to enter his house in order to kill him and his family while they were hiding in the basement, but did not manage to break in. Lefter knew the attackers, who were his neighbors and even youth he had given pocket money to, but refused to name them, claiming he did not see them.

During the mass expulsions of Greeks from Istanbul in 1964, he left for Greece. When İsmet İnönü was asked whether or not he likes Lefter, he replied: "I like Lefter, but I don't like Lefter's kind", referring to Greeks.

Although he returned to Turkey in 1966, οn 20 February, while managing Çukurova İdman Yurdu, Lefter was stabbed in the leg by Fikri Özkörüklü, a restaurant owner who was upset over the exclusion of goalkeeper, Yusuf Şimşek, from the team. In 1974 he got attacked again after the Turkish invasion of Cyprus. During a visit to the Büyükada Police Station due to a property sale the police officer proceeded to slap Lefter and tell him "We drove you out of Anatolia, we threw you into the sea in İzmir, and we'll throw you out of here too!". Prime Minister Bülent Ecevit subsequently criticized the action of the police officer.

== Legacy ==
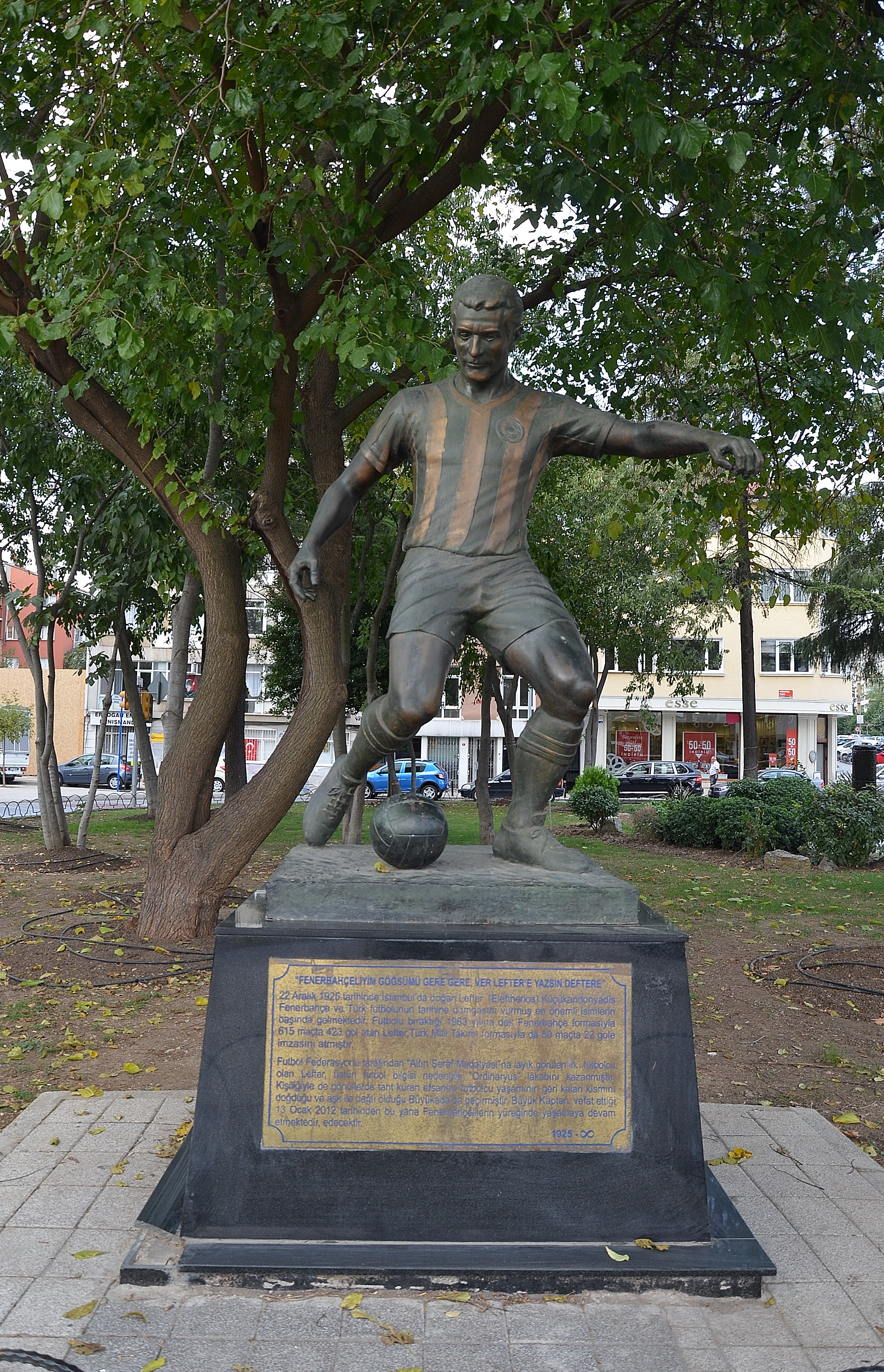
Statue of Lefter Küçükandonyadis at Yoğurtçu Park, close to Şükrü Saracoğlu Stadium, in Kadıköy, Istanbul

His statue was erected next to the Şükrü Saracoğlu Stadium in 2009. He was buried in the Greek Orthodox cemetery in his native island Büyükada in Istanbul.

== Popular Culture ==
A Netflix film about his life, titled Lefter: Bir Ordinaryüs Hikayesi ("Lefter: The Story of the Ordinarius"), was released in 2015.

Poet Bedri Rahmi Eyüboğlu praised Lefter's goalscoring ability in his poem İstanbul Destanı ("Istanbul Legend"). The poem included the line "Ver Lefter'e yaz deftere" ("Pass it to Lefter, you can already write down the goal"), reflecting his reputation as a reliable scorer, which became a popular chant among Fenerbahçe fans.

== Career statistics ==
Scores and results list Turkey's goal tally first, score column indicates score after each Lefter goal.

List of international goals scored by Lefter
| No. | Date | Venue | Opponent | Score | Result | Competition | Ref. |
|---|---|---|---|---|---|---|---|
| 1 | 23 April 1948 | Leoforos Alexandras Stadium, Athens, Greece | Greece | 2–0 | 3–1 | Friendly | |
| 2 | 2 August 1948 | Green Pond Road Stadium, Walthamstow, England | Republic of China | 4–0 | 4–0 | 1948 Summer Olympics | |
| 3 | 20 November 1949 | 19 Mayıs Stadium, Ankara, Turkey | Syria | 5–0 | 7–0 | 1950 FIFA World Cup qualification | |
| 4 | 28 May 1950 | Dolmabahçe Stadium, Istanbul, Turkey | Iran | 5–1 | 6–1 | Friendly | |
| 5 | 28 May 1950 | Dolmabahçe Stadium, Istanbul, Turkey | Iran | 6–1 | 6–1 | Friendly | |
| 6 | 3 December 1950 | Dolmabahçe Stadium, Istanbul, Turkey | Israel | 3–2 | 3–2 | Friendly | |
| 7 | 10 June 1951 | Råsunda Stadium, Stockholm, Sweden | Sweden | 1–0 | 1–3 | Friendly | |
| 8 | 20 June 1954 | Charmilles Stadium, Geneva, Switzerland | South Korea | 2–0 | 7–0 | 1954 FIFA World Cup | |
| 9 | 23 June 1954 | Hardturm Stadium, Zürich, Switzerland | West Germany | 2–7 | 2–7 | 1954 FIFA World Cup | |
| 10 | 26 June 1955 | Stadio Comunale, Trieste, Italy | Italy B | 1–1 | 1–1 | Mediterranean Cup | |
| 11 | 18 December 1955 | Mithatpaşa Stadium, Istanbul, Turkey | Portugal | 1–1 | 3–1 | Friendly | |
| 12 | 19 February 1956 | Mithatpaşa Stadium, Istanbul, Turkey | Hungary | 1–0 | 3–1 | Friendly | |
| 13 | 19 February 1956 | Mithatpaşa Stadium, Istanbul, Turkey | Hungary | 2–0 | 3–1 | Friendly | |
| 14 | 5 April 1957 | Al Zamalek Stadium, Cairo, Egypt | Egypt | 1–0 | 4–0 | Mediterranean Cup | |
| 15 | 5 April 1957 | Al Zamalek Stadium, Cairo, Egypt | Egypt | 2–0 | 4–0 | Mediterranean Cup | |
| 16 | 5 April 1957 | Al Zamalek Stadium, Cairo, Egypt | Egypt | 3–0 | 4–0 | Mediterranean Cup | |
| 17 | 26 April 1959 | Mithatpaşa Stadium, Istanbul, Turkey | Romania | 1–0 | 2–0 | 1960 European Nations' Cup qualifying | |
| 18 | 26 April 1959 | Mithatpaşa Stadium, Istanbul, Turkey | Romania | 2–0 | 2–0 | 1960 European Nations' Cup qualifying | |
| 19 | 8 June 1960 | 19 Mayıs Stadium, Ankara, Turkey | Scotland | 2–1 | 4–2 | Friendly | |
| 20 | 8 June 1960 | 19 Mayıs Stadium, Ankara, Turkey | Scotland | 3–1 | 4–2 | Friendly | |
| 21 | 16 May 1962 | Mithatpaşa Stadium, Istanbul, Turkey | Israel | 1–0 | 1–0 | Friendly | |

== Honours ==
Fenerbahçe

- Süper Lig: 1959, 1960–61, 1963–64
- National Division: 1950
- Prime Minister's Cup: 1950
- Istanbul Football League: 1947–48, 1956–57, 1958–59
- Atatürk Cup: 1963–64

Individual

- Turkish League top scorer: 1950, 1957–58
- Istanbul League top scorer: 1947–48, 1953–54
- Turkish Footballer of the Year: 1955

== See also ==
- List of Fenerbahçe S.K. records and statistics
- List of foreign Serie A players

== Bibliography ==
- Hergün, Haluk (2012). Lefter (Futbolun Ordinaryüsü) (in Turkish). NTV (Biyograf Dizisi). ISBN 9786055443481.
