= 1965–66 Turkish Cup =

Türkiye Kupası

Tournament details
- Country: Turkey
- Teams: 67

Final positions
- Champions: Galatasaray (4th title)
- Runners-up: Beşiktaş

Tournament statistics
- Matches played: 73
- Goals scored: 209 (2.86 per match)
- Top goal scorer(s): Abdullah Çevrim; Selim Soydan (4 goals each)

The 1965–66 Turkish Cup was the 4th edition of the annual tournament that determined the association football Süper Lig Turkish Cup (Turkish: Türkiye Kupası) champion under the auspices of the Turkish Football Federation (Turkish: Türkiye Futbol Federasyonu; TFF). Galatasaray successfully contested Beşiktaş 1–0 in the final. The results of the tournament also determined which clubs would be promoted or relegated.

== Quarter-finals ==
In the Quarter Finals round, Fenerbahçe, Galatasaray, Gençlerbirliği, and Beşiktaş advanced to the Semi-Finals round; Denizli Karagücü, Ankaragücü, Adana Demirspor, and Bursaspor were eliminated.

Team 1	Agg.	Team 2	1st leg	2nd leg
Denizli Karagücü	0–6	Fenerbahçe	0–2	0–4
Galatasaray	3–4	Ankaragücü	1–3	2–1
Adana Demirspor	2–6	Gençlerbirliği	1–1	1–5
Bursaspor	0–3	Beşiktaş	0–2	0–1

== Semi-finals ==
In the Semi-Finals round, Galatasaray and Beşiktaş advanced to the final; Fenerbahçe and Gençlerbirliği were eliminated.

Team 1	Agg.	Team 2	1st leg	2nd leg
Galatasaray	3–1	Fenerbahçe	0–0	3–1 (aet)
Gençlerbirliği	1–2	Beşiktaş	0–1	1–1 (aet)

== Final ==
19 June 1966 Final	Galatasaray	1–0	Beşiktaş	Istanbul, Turkey
16:30 EEST (UTC+03)	Turan Doğangün 88'			Stadium: Mithatpaşa Stadium; Referee: Rudolf Kreitlein (West Germany)
