= Beyoğluspor =

Sports club in Turkey

- Full name: Beyoğlu Spor Kulübü
- Sports: Association football; Basketball; Volleyball; Table tennis
- Founded: 1877; 149 years ago; (as Clio Sports Club); 1886; 140 years ago; (as Hermes Sport Club); 1914; 112 years ago; (as Greek Football Team); 1922; 104 years ago; (as Pera Sports Club); 1923; 103 years ago; (as Beyoğlu Spor Kulübü)
- League: Istanbul Amateur Second Division
- Based in: Istanbul, Turkey
- Colours: Yellow; Black
- Chairman: Apostol Harizianos
- Website: www.beyoglusporkulubu.org

Beyoğlu Spor Kulübü, also known as the Beyoğlu Sports Club, or by its historic Greek name of Athlitikós Sýllogos Péran (Greek: Αθλητικός Σύλλογος Πέραν), or Pera Sports Club, is an amateur sports club based in Istanbul, Turkey. It fields teams in football, basketball, volleyball and table tennis.

== History ==
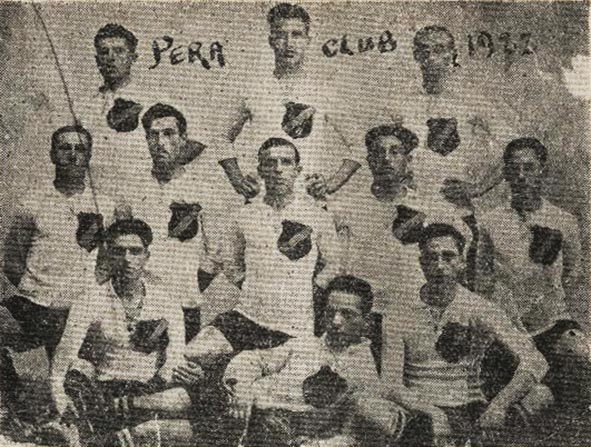
Pera Club, 1922

Since the second half of the 19th century the Greek community of Constantinople founded several sports clubs and organized sports activities such as the Pan-Constantinopolitan Games.

The club claims it was founded in Pera in 1877, by three local Greek intellectuals, K.D. Kostarakis, I.A. Zervoudakis and A.K. Stefopoulos, as "Clio Sports Club". In 1886, it was renamed to "Hermes Sport Club", in which the football department was founded in 1914 and was renamed to "Greek Football Team". In 1922 it was renamed to "Pera Sports Club". With the establishment of the Republic of Turkey in 1923, it was formally registered as "Beyoğlu Spor Kulübü".

Until 1926, the club's activities were housed in the deserted gym of Hermes SC. However, after 1926 the club moved to the building of the "Ladies Charity Fraternity of Pera", also located in the region of Beyoğlu. Initially, Beyoğluspor maintained two departments, football and gymnastics. Later, there were established departments of wrestling and boxing and in 1926 of basketball and volleyball.

During its history, many of the club's departments had been awarded in a variety of competitions. The Volleyball department of Beyoğluspor was one of the most distinguished teams in Turkey during the 1940s and 1950s, while it also won the Turkish championship for some years that period. The football team managed to capture the fifth place at the Istanbul Football League in 1945, while in the early 1960s it competed in the First League. The efforts of the club managers and presidents, such as G. Chalkousis, S. Kanakis, G. Mouzakis, A. Tripos, played a determining part in these successes. On the other hand, several athletes were distinguished both in Greek but also in international level, like the World Champion in weightlifting and latter coach of the Greek weightlifting team, Christos Iakovou. Beyoğluspor did not field senior team from late 1990s to 2014 due to money shortage. Finally Beyoğluspor joined 6th Group of Istanbul 2nd Amateur League, lowest amateur level for İstanbul teams in 2014–15 season. They finished this group as sixth.

== Popularity ==
The majority of the fans were among the Greek community of the city. However, Beyoğluspor witnessed a dramatic decrease of its supporters for a period when Lefter Küçükandonyadis, a Turkey national football team player of Greek descent and one of the best players in Turkey in 1950s and 1960s, played for Fenerbahçe, turning most of the local Greeks to change temporarily their support to Fenerbahçe.

== Present situation ==
Today, Beyoğluspor is one of the few surviving Greek foundations of the city and fields teams in volleyball, basketball and football at the amateur level.

== League participation for football branch ==
- First League: 1962–1964
- Second League: 1964–1967
- Third League: 1967–1973, 1984–1987
- Amateur Leagues: 1877–1962, 1973–1984, 1987–present

== Notable athletes ==
- Christos Iakovou, weightlifter and former coach of Greek National Weightlifting Team
- Kadri Aytaç, football player
- Şükrü Gülesin, football player
- Kostas Negrepontis, football player
- Themos Asderis, football player
- Koço Kasapoğlu, football player
- Alekos Sofianidis, football player
- Avram Barokas, basketball player
- Yani Tomaidis, basketball player

== See also ==
- Kurtuluş S.K., another still existing sports club in Istanbul founded by local Greeks.
