= 1967–68 1.Lig =

10th season of top-tier Turkish football

1.Lig
- Season: 1967–68
- Champions: Fenerbahçe (5th title)
- Relegated: Hacettepe; Ankaragücü; Feriköy
- European Cup: Fenerbahçe
- Cup Winners' Cup: Altay
- Inter-Cities Fairs Cup: Göztepe
- Matches played: 272
- Goals scored: 602 (2.21 per match)
- Top goalscorer: Fevzi Zemzem (19 goals)

Statistics of the Turkish First Football League for the 1967–68 season.

== Overview ==
It was contested by 17 teams, and Fenerbahçe S.K. won the championship.

== League table ==
Pos	Team	Pld	W	D	L	GF	GA	GD	Pts	Qualification or relegation
1	Fenerbahçe (C)	32	19	11	2	38	12	+26	49	Qualification to European Cup first round
2	Beşiktaş	32	15	12	5	42	24	+18	42	
3	Galatasaray	32	13	10	9	44	36	+8	36	
4	Göztepe A.Ş.	32	13	9	10	46	34	+12	35	Invitation to Inter-Cities Fairs Cup first round
5	Altay	32	11	13	8	37	30	+7	35	Qualification to Cup Winners' Cup first round
6	Bursaspor	32	10	13	9	37	33	+4	33	
7	Türk Telekomspor	32	10	13	9	34	31	+3	33	Invitation to Balkans Cup
8	Gençlerbirliği	32	11	10	11	28	26	+2	32	
9	Eskişehirspor	32	11	9	12	40	36	+4	31	
10	Mersin İdman Yurdu	32	12	6	14	42	44	−2	30	
11	Ankara Demirspor	32	8	14	10	29	33	−4	30	
12	Vefa	32	8	13	11	31	35	−4	29	
13	Altınordu A.Ş.	32	11	7	14	33	47	−14	29	
14	Beypazarı Şekerspor	32	9	10	13	32	41	−9	28	
15	Hacettepe Spor (R)	32	9	10	13	32	45	−13	28	Relegation to Turkish Second Football League
16	MKE Ankaragücü (R)	32	8	6	18	30	47	−17	22	Relegation to Turkish Second Football League
17	Feriköy (R)	32	8	6	18	27	48	−21	22	Relegation to Turkish Second Football League

Rules for classification: 1) points; 2) goal difference; 3) number of goals scored.
(C) Champions; (R) Relegated

== Results ==
Home \ Away	ALT	ATO	AND	AGÜ	BJK	BUR	ESK	FNB	FER	GAL	GEN	GÖZ	HAC	MİY	PTT	ŞKR	VEF
Altay		0–1	2–0	0–0	2–2	1–1	4–1	0–0	3–1	2–1	2–0	2–0	1–0	1–1	4–0	2–0	1–0
Altınordu	1–1		3–0	2–0	2–1	0–0	0–0	1–1	2–1	0–1	0–0	1–0	0–2	2–1	0–2	3–2	1–2
Ankara Demirspor	1–0	3–2		0–0	0–1	1–1	2–1	0–0	0–1	3–2	0–0	2–1	2–1	3–1	0–0	0–1	1–1
Ankaragücü	4–2	1–3	0–0		1–3	4–1	0–1	0–2	0–1	3–3	1–1	1–0	1–0	0–1	0–3	2–2	1–0
Beşiktaş	1–1	1–0	3–2	2–0		0–0	0–1	0–0	3–0	4–4	1–0	1–0	3–0	1–0	2–0	0–0	1–0
Bursaspor	4–1	4–0	1–0	3–1	0–0		3–0	0–1	2–0	2–2	1–2	1–0	2–1	2–1	0–0	2–1	2–2
Eskişehirspor	4–0	6–1	0–0	1–0	2–1	3–1		3–0	2–1	0–1	1–0	1–1	0–1	2–2	0–1	3–0	1–1
Fenerbahçe	1–0	1–0	2–1	1–0	3–2	1–0	3–0		3–0	3–0	0–0	1–0	1–1	1–0	2–0	1–1	1–1
Feriköy	1–1	0–1	1–1	3–0	0–1	3–0	0–0	0–1		0–4	2–1	2–0	0–0	0–1	2–2	0–1	1–0
Galatasaray	1–2	1–0	1–0	2–0	1–1	1–1	1–1	0–2	1–3		0–1	0–0	1–0	3–0	0–0	1–0	1–0
Gençlerbirliği	1–1	2–1	1–2	3–1	0–0	0–0	1–0	0–0	1–0	2–1		1–2	5–1	2–1	1–0	1–2	1–1
Göztepe	0–0	3–2	2–2	2–5	2–0	1–0	2–2	1–0	9–1	2–1	0–0		1–1	3–0	2–1	4–1	2–1
Hacettepe	2–1	1–2	1–1	0–1	1–1	1–1	1–0	0–3	2–1	0–0	1–0	1–1		3–2	1–5	1–1	2–1
Mersin İdman Yurdu	1–0	5–1	1–1	1–0	0–0	2–1	2–1	1–2	2–1	1–2	2–0	1–1	3–4		2–1	3–1	3–1
PTT	0–0	1–1	1–1	2–0	0–0	0–0	3–2	0–1	2–0	1–1	0–1	1–3	1–0	0–0		0–0	2–1
Şekerspor	0–0	4–0	1–0	0–2	1–2	0–0	3–1	0–0	1–0	0–1	1–0	0–1	2–2	2–1	3–4		1–4
Vefa	0–0	0–0	0–0	2–1	1–4	3–1	0–0	0–0	1–1	2–5	1–0	1–0	1–0	2–0	1–1	0–0	

Source: TFF, Mackolik
Legend: Blue = home team win; Yellow = draw; Red = away team win.
