= Petrol Ofisi S.K. =

Turkish sports club

Petrol Ofisi
- Full name: Petrol Ofisi Gençlik ve Spor Kulübü
- Founded: 1954
- Dissolved: 2010
- Ground: Cebeci İnönü Stadium, Ankara
- Capacity: 5000
Home colours	Away colours

Petrol Ofisi was a sports club founded in Ankara in 1954. It received the name of Petrol Ofisi (POAS; Petroleum Agency) in 2000, after the privatization of POAS. Petrol Ofisi withdrew due to financial difficulties. In 2010 the registration was revoked and the club was closed by the Turkish Football Federation. They played in the first division in the 1994–1995 season. Osvaldo Nartallo was a player of Petrol Ofisi.

== League performance ==
- Turkish Super League: 1994–95
- TFF First League: 1964–68, 1981–94, 1995–96, 1998–99
- TFF Second League: 1968–79, 1996–98, 1999–01
- TFF Third League: 2001–02
- Amateur Leagues: 1954–64, 1979–81
