= 1975–76 Mersin İdmanyurdu season =

Mersin İdmanyurdu
1975–76 season
- President: Kaya Mutlu
- Coach: (Turkey) Kadri Aytaç
- Stadium: Mersin, Turkey
- Second League: Red Group: 1st League cup: Runners-up
- Turkish Cup: Eliminated at R4
- Top goalscorer: (Turkey) Şeref Başoğlu (9)
Home colours	Away colours	Third colours

Mersin İdmanyurdu (also Mersin İdman Yurdu, Mersin İY, or MİY) Sports Club; located in Mersin, east Mediterranean coast of Turkey in 1975–76. At the end of 1975–76 season Mersin İdmanyurdu promoted to First League after two seasons since its relegated from the league in 1973–74 season. It was the second promotion of the team. The 1974–75 season was the sixth season of Mersin İdmanyurdu (MİY) football team in Turkish Second Football League, the second level division in Turkey. They finished 1st in the Red Group.

The president of the club was Kaya Mutlu, mayor of the Mersin city. General captain was Burhan Kanun. Club director was Kazım Tunç.

The manager of the team was Kadri Aytaç, former player of Galatasaray and Mersin İdmanyurdu. They have lost second league championship game against Samsunspor.

== Pre-season ==
The team attended Spor-Toto Cup organized between 02.08.1975 and 30.08.1975 in 7th group together with Adanaspor, Hatayspor, İskenderunspor and Konya İdmanyurdu.

- 30.08.1975 - MİY-Syria Amateur national football team.

== 1975–76 Second League participation ==
In its 13th season (1975–76) Second League was played with 32 teams, 16 in red group and 16 in white group. First teams promoted to First League 1976–77 and last teams relegated to Third League 1976–77 in each group. Mersin İY became 1st with 14 wins and 39 goals in Red Group. Şeref Başoğlu was the most scorer player with 9 goals.

=== Results summary ===
Mersin İdmanyurdu (MİY) 1975–76 Second League Red Group league summary:

	Overall									Home								Away							
Stage	Pc	Pl	W	D	L	GF	GA	GD	Pt	Pl	W	D	L	GF	GA	GD	Pt	Pl	W	D	L	GF	GA	GD	Pt
First half		15	6	5	4	11	10	+1	17	8	5	2	1	9	5	+4	12	7	1	3	3	2	5	-3	5
Second half		15	8	6	1	28	7	+21	22	7	7	0	0	22	3	+19	14	8	1	6	1	6	4	+2	8
Overall	1	30	14	11	5	39	17	+22	39	15	12	2	1	31	8	+23	26	15	2	9	4	8	9	-1	13

Sources: 1975–76 Turkish Second Football League pages.

=== League table ===
Mersin İY's league performance in Second League Red Group in 1975–76 season is shown in the following table.

Pc	Team	Games				Goals		Pts	Home			Away		
Pc	Team	Pl	W	D	L	F	A	Pts	F–A	R	Pc	F–A	R	Pc
1	Mersin İdmanyurdu (C) (P)	30	14	11	5	39	17	39	–	–	–	–	–	–
2	Kayserispor	30	15	5	10	40	19	35	1–0			0–2		
3	MKE Kırıkkalespor	30	12	8	10	36	27	32	1–1	13		3–0	28	
4	Konyaspor	30	11	10	9	23	19	32	0–0			1–1		
5	Bandırmaspor	30	12	8	10	37	36	32	1–0			0–1		
6	Karabükspor	30	10	11	9	26	23	31	5–1			0–1		
7	Kocaelispor	30	12	7	11	32	32	31	0–2			1–1		
8	Sarıyer	30	9	12	9	23	25	30	3–0			0–0		
9	Gaziantepspor	30	10	9	11	19	21	29	3–0			0–1		
10	Eskişehir Demirspor	30	10	8	12	30	31	28	1–0			0–0		
11	Antalyaspor	30	9	10	11	33	45	28	5–2	29	1	0–0	14	
12	Gençlerbirliği	30	8	11	11	26	24	27	2–1	15		0–0	30	1
13	Denizlispor	30	10	7	13	21	27	27	1–0			0–0		
14	Malatyaspor	30	7	13	10	26	37	27	3–1			1–1		
15	Manisaspor	30	10	6	14	24	30	26	4–0			1–0		
16	Hatayspor (R)	30	11	4	15	24	46	26	1–0	27	1	1–1	12	

Note: Won, drawn and lost points are 2, 1 and 0. F belongs to MİY and A belongs to corresponding team for both home and away matches.

=== Results by round ===
Results of games MİY played in 1975–76 Second League Red Group by rounds:

Round	1	2	3	4	5	6	7	8	9	10	11	12	13	14	15	16	17	18	19	20	21	22	23	24	25	26	27	28	29	30
Ground	H	H	A	H	A	H	A	H	A	A	H	A	H	A	H	A	A	H	A	H	A	H	A	H	H	A	H	A	H	A
Result	W	L	W	W	L	D	D	W	L	L	W	D	D	D	W	D	D	W	D	W	D	W	D	W	W	L	W	W	W	D
Position								3	5	8	6	8															1	1	1	1

Source: 1975–76 Turkish Second Football League pages.
A = Away; H = Home; W = Win; D = Draw; L = Loss

=== First half ===
7 September 1975 Round 1	Mersin İdmanyurdu	1 – 0	Eskişehir Demirspor	Tevfik Sırrı Gür Stadium, Mersin
Sunday		Report

14 September 1975 Round 2	Mersin İdmanyurdu	0 – 2	Kocaelispor	Tevfik Sırrı Gür Stadium, Mersin
Sunday		Report

21 September 1975 Round 3	Manisaspor	0 – 1	Mersin İdmanyurdu	19 Mayıs Stadium, Manisa
Sunday		Report

28 September 1975 Round 4	Mersin İdmanyurdu	3 – 1	Malatyaspor	Tevfik Sırrı Gür Stadium, Mersin
Sunday		Report

5 October 1975 Round 5	Kayserispor	2 – 0	Mersin İdmanyurdu	Atatürk Stadium, Kayseri
Sunday		Report

11 October 1975 Round 6	Mersin İdmanyurdu	0 – 0	Konyaspor	Tevfik Sırrı Gür Stadium, Mersin
Saturday		Report

19 October 1975 Round 7	Sarıyer	0 – 0	Mersin İdmanyurdu	Vefa Stadium, Karagümrük, Istanbul
Sunday		Report		Referee: Ekrem Yenci

2 November 1975 Round 8	Mersin İdmanyurdu	1 – 0	Denizlispor	Tevfik Sırrı Gür Stadium, Mersin
Sunday, 14:00		Report

9 November 1975 Round 9	Gaziantepspor	1 – 0	Mersin İdmanyurdu	Kamil Ocak Stadium, Gaziantep
Sunday		Report

23 November 1975 Round 10	Karabükspor	1 – 0	Mersin İdmanyurdu	Yenişehir Stadium, Karabük
Sunday, 14:00		Report

7 December 1975 Round 11	Mersin İdmanyurdu	1 – 0	Bandırmaspor	Tevfik Sırrı Gür Stadium, Mersin
Sunday, 13:30		Report

14 December 1975 Round 12	Hatayspor	1 – 1	Mersin İdmanyurdu	City Stadium, Antakya, Hatay
Sunday, 13:30	Ekrem 40'	Report	65' Ayhan

21 December 1975 Round 13	Mersin İdmanyurdu	1 – 1	MKE Kırıkkalespor	Tevfik Sırrı Gür Stadium, Mersin
Sunday, 13:15		Report

4 January 1976 Round 14	Antalyaspor	0 – 0	Mersin İdmanyurdu	City Stadium, Antalya
Sunday		Report

11 January 1976 Round 15	Mersin İdmanyurdu	2 – 1	Gençlerbirliği	Tevfik Sırrı Gür Stadium, Mersin
Sunday, 13:15		Report

=== Second half ===
15 February 1976 Round 16	Eskişehir Demirspor	0 – 0	Mersin İdmanyurdu	Atatürk Stadium, Eskişehir
Sunday		Report

22 February 1976 Round 17	Kocaelispor	1 – 1	Mersin İdmanyurdu	İsmetpaşa Stadium, İzmit, Kocaeli
Sunday		Report

29 February 1976 Round 18	Mersin İdmanyurdu	4 – 0	Manisaspor	Tevfik Sırrı Gür Stadium, Mersin
Sunday		Report

7 March 1976 Round 19	Malatyaspor	1 – 1	Mersin İdmanyurdu	City Stadium, Malatya
Sunday, 14:15		Report

14 March 1976 Round 20	Mersin İdmanyurdu	1 – 0	Kayserispor	Tevfik Sırrı Gür Stadium, Mersin
		Report

21 March 1971 Round 21	Konyaspor	1 – 1	Mersin İdmanyurdu	City Stadium, Konya
Sunday		Report

28 March 1976 Round 22	Mersin İdmanyurdu	3 – 0	Sarıyer	Tevfik Sırrı Gür Stadium, Mersin
Sunday, 15:30	Şeref Başoğlu 18'; Zeki Temizer 46'; Burhan Çetinkaya 73'	Report		Referee: Yüksel Erkan

4 April 1976 Round 23	Denizlispor	0 – 0	Mersin İdmanyurdu	City Stadium, Denizli
Sunday		Report

11 April 1976 Round 24	Mersin İdmanyurdu	3 – 0	Gaziantepspor	Tevfik Sırrı Gür Stadium, Mersin
Sunday		Report

18 April 1976 Round 25	Mersin İdmanyurdu	5 – 1	Karabükspor	Tevfik Sırrı Gür Stadium, Mersin
Sunday		Report

25 April 1976 Round 26	Bandırmaspor	1 – 0	Mersin İdmanyurdu	City Stadium, Bandırma, Balıkesir
Sunday		Report

2 May 1976 Round 27	Mersin İdmanyurdu	1 – 0	Hatayspor	Tevfik Sırrı Gür Stadium, Mersin
Sunday	Ayhan Öz 60' (pen.)	Report		Referee: Kemal Akay

9 May 1976 Round 28	MKE Kırıkkalespor	0 – 3	Mersin İdmanyurdu	Fikret Karabudak Stadium, Kırıkkale
Sunday		Report		Referee: Hilmi Ok
Note: Awarded score (Game was suspended by referee due to violent protests)

16 May 1976 Round 29	Mersin İdmanyurdu	5 – 2	Antalyaspor	Tevfik Sırrı Gür Stadium, Mersin
Sunday, 16:30	Şeref Başoğlu 6' (F); Şeref Başoğlu 13' (F); Ayhan Öz 20' (F); Şeref Başoğlu 40' (F); İbrahim Arayıcı 85' (F)	Report	60' (pen.) Metin; 65' Ümran Kaçar; (red card) Erdal; (red card) Tuncer	Referee: Güngör Tuncel

23 May 1976 Round 30	Gençlerbirliği	0 – 0	Mersin İdmanyurdu	Cebeci İnönü Stadium, Ankara
Sunday		Report

=== Championship match ===
Mersin İdmanyurdu lost the second league championship game against Samsunspor, the White Group's winner.

30 May 1976 2. Lig Championship	Samsunspor	3 – 1	Mersin İdmanyurdu	19 Mayıs Stadium, Ankara
Sunday, 18:00	Temel Keskindemir 6' (F); Temel Keskindemir 67' (H); Temel Keskindemir 89' (F)	Report	78' (F) Zeki Temizer	Referee: Yılmaz Önen

== 1975–76 Turkish Cup participation ==
1975–76 Turkish Cup was played for the 14th season as Türkiye Kupası by 88 teams. First and second elimination rounds were played in one-leg elimination system. Third and fourth elimination rounds and finals were played in two-legs elimination system. Mersin İdmanyurdu participated in 1975–76 Turkish Cup from round 2 and eliminated at round 4 by Ankaragücü. Ankaragücü was eliminated by Galatasaray at semifinals. Galatasaray won the Cup for the 6th time and became eligible for 1976–77 ECW Cup.

=== Cup track ===
The drawings and results Mersin İdmanyurdu (MİY) followed in 1975–76 Turkish Cup are shown in the following table.

Round	Own League	Opponent's League	Opponent	A	H	Result
Round 2 S1	Second League Red Group	Third League Second Group	Ceyhanspor	–	2–0	Promoted to R2 S2
Round 2 S2	Second League Red Group	Second League Red Group	Gaziantepspor	–	2–0	Promoted to R3
Round 3	Second League Red Group	First League	Zonguldakspor	1–3	3–0	Promoted to R4
Round 4	Second League Red Group	First League	Ankaragücü	1–2	1–1	Eliminated

Note: In the above table 'Score' shows For and Against goals whether the match played at home or not.

=== Game details ===
Mersin İdmanyurdu (MİY) 1975–76 Turkish Cup game reports is shown in the following table. Kick off times are in EET and EEST.

15 October 1975 R2 S1	Mersin İdmanyurdu	2 – 0	Ceyhanspor	Tevfik Sırrı Gür Stadium, Mersin
Wednesday, 15:00		Report

12 November 1975 R2 S2	Mersin İdmanyurdu	2 – 0	Gaziantepspor	Tevfik Sırrı Gür Stadium, Mersin
Wednesday, 13:30		Report

24 December 1975 R3 L1	Zonguldakspor	3 – 1	Mersin İdmanyurdu	City Stadium, Zonguldak
Wednesday, 13:30	Selçuk Yalçıntaş 4'; Remzi Sezer 6'; Ulvi Girginfırat 61' (pen.)	Report	78' (pen.) Doğan Küçükduru	Referee: Ünal Şahin

7 January 1976 R3 L2	Mersin İdmanyurdu	3 – 0	Zonguldakspor	Tevfik Sırrı Gür Stadium, Mersin
Wednesday, 13:15	Doğan Küçükduru 3'; Ayhan Öz 10'; Ayhan Öz 44'	Report		Referee: Yüksel Erdem

18 February 1976 R4 L1	Mersin İdmanyurdu	1 – 1	Ankaragücü	Tevfik Sırrı Gür Stadium, Mersin
Wednesday, 14:00	Kemal Damkal 44'	Report	56' Adnan Sezgin	Referee: Cumhur Demir

25 February 1976 R4 L2	Ankaragücü	2 – 1	Mersin İdmanyurdu	19 Mayıs Stadium, Ankara
Wednesday, 14:00	Ali Osman Renklibay 2'; Adnan Sezgin 50'	Report	10' Hikmet Erön	Referee: Kemal Akay

Source: 1975–76 Turkish Cup pages.

== Management ==
=== Club management ===
Kaya Mutlu was club president. Burhan Kanun was general captain.

=== Coaching team ===
1975–76 Mersin İdmanyurdu head coaches:

Nat	Head coach	Period	Pl	W	D	L	Notes
(Turkey)		01.08.1975 – 31.05.1976					

Note: Only official games were included.

== 1975–76 squad ==
Stats are counted for 1975–76 Second League matches and 1975–76 Turkish Cup (Türkiye Kupası) matches. In the team rosters five substitutes were allowed to appear, two of whom were substitutable. Only the players who appeared in game rosters were included and listed in the order of appearance.

O	N	Nat	Name	Birth	Born	Pos	LA	LG	CA	CG	TA	TG	Booked	Sent off (straight red)	← Season Notes →
1	1	(Turkey)	Aydın Tohumcu	1 Feb 1943	Bilecik	GK									1975 ST Ankaragücü.
2	2	(Turkey)	Rüçhan Dağdeviren	1951	Istanbul	DF									1975 ST Fenerbahçe.
3	3	(Turkey)	Kemal Damkal	1950	Adana	DF									→ previous season.
4	4	(Turkey)	Tahir Temur	1954	Istanbul	DF									1975 ST İstanbulspor.
5	5	(Turkey)	Kemal Özcan	1948	Kayseri	DF									→ previous season.
6	6	(Turkey)	Hikmet Erön	1948	Istanbul	MF									→ previous season.
7	7	(Turkey)	Burhan Çetinkaya	1952	Trabzon	FW									→ previous season.
8	8	(Turkey)	Davut Şahin	1948		FW									→ previous season.
9	9	(Turkey)	Şeref Başoğu	1947	Adapazarı	MF									→ previous season.
10	10	(Turkey)	Ayhan Öz (C)	20 Jul 1945	Mersin	FW									→ previous season.
11	11	(Turkey)	Zeki Temizer	1945	Istanbul	FW									→ previous season.
12	4	(Turkey)	Mehmet Dayan	1951	Balıkesir	DF									1975 ST İskenderunspor.
13	6	(Turkey)	Metin Yılmaz	1945		MF									→ previous season.
14	8	(Turkey)	Kamuran Yavuz	1947	Tekirdağ	MF									→ previous season.
15	9	(Turkey)	İbrahim Arayıcı	1949	Silifke	FW									→ previous season.
16	7	(Turkey)	Levent Arıkdoğan	23 Aug 1953	Mersin	MF									→ previous season.
17	10	(Turkey)	Doğan Küçükduru	1949	Istanbul	FW									→ previous season.
18	5	(Turkey)	Can Mercan	1955	Tarsus	MF									1975 ST Ank.Demirspor.
19	1	(Turkey)	Atıf Öztoprak	8 May 1952	Sakarya	GK									→ previous season.
20	13	(Turkey)	Turhan Akça	1956	Ankara	DF									1975 ST Hacettepe.
21	14	(Turkey)	Kasım Özyamanoğlu	1953	Tarsus	DF									→ previous season.

Sources: 1975–76 season squad data from maçkolik com, Milliyet, and Cem Pekin Archives.

News from Milliyet:

- Transfers in: Aydın (Ankaragücü); Rüçhan (Fenerbahçe).
- Transfers out: Nevruz went to Fenerbahçe in exchange for Rüçhan and some money.
- General Captain Burhan Kanun has started an aid campaign for former player Cihat Erbil who was cancered. Mersin İdmanyurdu players also collected an amount. Some firms, citizens and sportsmen including those of neighbour teams Adanaspor and Adana Demirspor contributed too. Cihat had been transferred from Bandırmaspor in 1969.

== See also ==
- Football in Turkey
