= 1979–80 Mersin İdmanyurdu season =

Mersin İdmanyurdu
1979–80 season
- President: Hadi Doğan
- Coach: (Turkey) Suat Mamat
- Stadium: Mersin, Turkey
- Second League: Group A: 1st League cup: Runners-up
- Turkish Cup: Eliminated at R3
Home colours	Away colours	Third colours

Mersin İdmanyurdu (also Mersin İdman Yurdu, Mersin İY, or MİY) Sports Club; located in Mersin, east Mediterranean coast of Turkey in 1979–80. At the end of 1979–80 season Mersin İdmanyurdu has promoted to First League for the third time. The 1979–80 was the eighth season of Mersin İdmanyurdu (MİY) football team in Second League, the second level division in Turkey. They finished 1st in Group A. They have lost second league championship game against Kocaelispor by penalties.

== 1979–80 Second League participation ==
In its 17th season (1979–80) Second League was played with 32 teams, 16 in two groups: Group A and Group B. Group winners promoted to First League 1980–81. Runners-up played a promotion game to determine the third club to be promoted to first league. No teams relegated because next year second and third leagues merged and third league abandoned. Mersin İY became 1st in Group A with 17 wins and 38 goals.

=== Results summary ===
Mersin İdmanyurdu (MİY) 1979–80 Second League Group A league summary:

	Overall									Home								Away							
Stage	Pc	Pl	W	D	L	GF	GA	GD	Pt	Pl	W	D	L	GF	GA	GD	Pt	Pl	W	D	L	GF	GA	GD	Pt
First half	1	15	9	4	2	20	7	+13	22	8	7	1	0	16	3	+13	15	7	2	3	2	4	4	0	7
Second half		15	8	3	4	18	13	+5	19	7	6	1	0	14	3	+11	13	8	2	2	4	4	10	-6	6
Overall	1	30	17	7	6	38	20	+18	41	15	13	2	0	30	6	+24	28	15	4	5	6	8	14	-6	13

Sources: 1979–80 Turkish Second Football League pages.

=== League table ===
Mersin İY's league performance in Second League Group A in 1979–80 season is shown in the following table.

Pc	Team	Games				Goals		Pts	Home			Away		
Pc	Team	Pl	W	D	L	F	A	Pts	F–A	R	Pc	F–A	R	Pc
1	Mersin İdmanyurdu (C) (P)	30	17	7	6	38	20	41	–	–	–	–	–	–
2	Boluspor (Q) (P)	30	16	7	7	38	19	39	0–0	13	1	0–2	28	1
3	Samsunspor	30	14	8	8	34	20	36	1–0	11	1	0–2	26	1
4	Ankaragücü	30	13	10	7	38	35	36	4–1	9	1	0–1	24	1
5	Karabükspor	30	12	9	9	25	27	33	2–1	20	1	0–1	5	2
6	Giresunspor	30	11	10	9	37	34	32	4–0	27	1	1–2	12	1
7	MKE Kırıkkalespor	30	11	9	10	39	29	31	2–0	15	1	0–3	30	1
8	Şekerspor	30	8	13	9	30	28	29	2–0	1	2	2–1	16	1
9	Urfaspor	30	12	5	13	28	27	29	1–0	4	1	2–1	19	1
10	Sivasspor	30	11	6	13	26	39	28	3–1	8	1	0–0	23	1
11	Konya İdmanyurdu	30	10	7	13	32	37	27	1–0	18	1	1–0	13	1
12	Erzurumspor	30	7	12	11	22	27	26	3–2	22	1	0–0	7	2
13	Sebat Gençlik	30	8	10	12	21	31	26	3–1	6	2	0–0	21	1
14	Ankara Demirspor	30	8	9	13	21	33	25	0–0	29	1	0–0	14	1
15	Elazığspor	30	7	8	15	20	38	22	2–0	25	1	1–1	10	1
16	Eskişehir Demirspor	30	6	8	16	33	48	20	2–0	17	1	1–0	2	1

Note: Won, drawn and lost points are 2, 1 and 0. F belongs to MİY and A belongs to corresponding team for both home and away matches. No relegation.

=== Results by round ===
Results of games MİY played in 1979–80 Second League Group A by rounds:

Round	1	2	3	4	5	6	7	8	9	10	11	12	13	14	15	16	17	18	19	20	21	22	23	24	25	26	27	28	29	30
Ground	H	A	A	H	A	H	A	H	H	A	H	A	H	A	H	A	H	H	A	H	A	H	A	A	H	A	H	A	H	A
Result	W	W	W	W	L	W	D	W	W	D	W	L	D	D	W	W	W	W	W	W	D	W	D	L	W	L	W	L	D	L
Position	2	1	1	1	2	2	2	1	1	1	1	1	1	1	1	1	1	1	1	1	1	1	1	1	1	1	1	1	1	1

Source: 1979–80 Turkish Second Football League pages.
A = Away; H = Home; W = Win; D = Draw; L = Loss

=== First half ===
26 August 1979 Round 1	Mersin İdmanyurdu	2 – 0	Şekerspor	Tevfik Sırrı Gür Stadium, Mersin
Sunday		Report

2 September 1979 Round 2	Eskişehir Demirspor	0 – 1	Mersin İdmanyurdu	Atatürk Stadium, Eskişehir
Sunday, 16:15		Report

9 September 1979 Round 3	Konya İdmanyurdu	0 – 1	Mersin İdmanyurdu	City Stadium, Konya
Sunday		Report

16 September 1979 Round 4	Mersin İdmanyurdu	1 – 0	Urfaspor	Tevfik Sırrı Gür Stadium, Mersin
Sunday, 16:00		Report

23 September 1979 Round 5	Karabükspor	1 – 0	Mersin İdmanyurdu	City Stadium, Karabük
Sunday		Report

30 September 1979 Round 6	Mersin İdmanyurdu	3 – 1	Sebat Gençlik	Tevfik Sırrı Gür Stadium, Mersin
Sunday		Report

7 October 1979 Round 7	Erzurumspor	0 – 0	Mersin İdmanyurdu	Cemal Gürsel Stadium, Erzurum
Sunday		Report

21 October 1979 Round 8	Mersin İdmanyurdu	3 – 1	Sivasspor	Tevfik Sırrı Gür Stadium, Mersin
Sunday		Report

28 October 1979 Round 9	Mersin İdmanyurdu	4 – 1	Ankaragücü	Tevfik Sırrı Gür Stadium, Mersin
Sunday, 15:00		Report

4 November 1979 Round 10	Elazığspor	1 – 1	Mersin İdmanyurdu	Atatürk Stadium, Elazığ
Sunday		Report

18 November 1979 Round 11	Mersin İdmanyurdu	1 – 0	Samsunspor	Tevfik Sırrı Gür Stadium, Mersin
Sunday		Report

25 November 1979 Round 12	Giresunspor	2 – 1	Mersin İdmanyurdu	City Stadium, Giresun
Sunday		Report

2 December 1979 Round 13	Mersin İdmanyurdu	0 – 0	Boluspor	Tevfik Sırrı Gür Stadium, Mersin
Sunday		Report

9 December 1979 Round 14	Ankara Demirspor	0 – 0	Mersin İdmanyurdu	Cebeci İnönü Stadium, Ankara
Sunday		Report

16 December 1979 Round 15	Mersin İdmanyurdu	2 – 0	MKE Kırıkkalespor	Tevfik Sırrı Gür Stadium, Mersin
Sunday		Report

=== Mid-season ===
In the mid-season, MİY played a jubilee match for captain İbrahim against Galatasaray on 13 January 1980 at Tevfik Sırrı Gür Stadium. İbrahim left jersey no. 9 to Mücellip on 10th minute.

- 13.01.1980 - MİY-Galatasaray: 0–1.

=== Second half ===
9 February 1980 Round 16	Şekerspor	1 – 2	Mersin İdmanyurdu	Cebeci İnönü Stadium, Ankara
Sunday		Report

17 February 1980 Round 17	Mersin İdmanyurdu	2 – 0	Eskişehir Demirspor	Tevfik Sırrı Gür Stadium, Mersin
Sunday		Report

24 February 1980 Round 18	Mersin İdmanyurdu	1 – 0	Konya İdmanyurdu	Tevfik Sırrı Gür Stadium, Mersin
Sunday, 14:30		Report

2 March 1980 Round 19	Urfaspor	1 – 2	Mersin İdmanyurdu	City Stadium, Şanlıurfa
Sunday	Şeref 12'	Report	16' Özcan Kızıltan; 41' Mücellip Pehlivan	Referee: Kemal Kaya

9 March 1980 Round 20	Mersin İdmanyurdu	2 – 1	Karabükspor	Tevfik Sırrı Gür Stadium, Mersin
Sunday	Feridun Alkan 30' (pen.); Ferdun Alkan 60' (pen.)	Report	59' (F) Vedat	Referee: Mustafa Gündüz

16 March 1980 Round 21	Sebat Gençlik	0 – 0	Mersin İdmanyurdu	City Stadium, Trabzon
Sunday		Report

23 March 1980 Round 22	Mersin İdmanyurdu	3 – 2	Erzurumspor	Tevfik Sırrı Gür Stadium, Mersin
Sunday, 14:45	Mehmet Ali Karakuş 13'; Tahir Temur 20'; Feridun Alkan 85' (pen.)	Report	44' Sadun Gemici; 89' K. Ahmet	Referee: Yalçın Gümüşkaya

30 March 1980 Round 23	Sivasspor	0 – 0	Mersin İdmanyurdu	City Stadium, Sivas
Sunday		Report

5 April 1980 Round 24	Ankaragücü	1 – 0	Mersin İdmanyurdu	Cebeci İnönü Stadium, Ankara
Saturday		Report

13 April 1980 Round 25	Mersin İdmanyurdu	2 – 0	Elazığspor	Tevfik Sırrı Gür Stadium, Mersin
Sunday	Mücellip Pehlivan 6'; Mücellip Pehlivan 74'	Report		Referee: Coşkun Evin

20 April 1980 Round 26	Samsunspor	2 – 0	Mersin İdmanyurdu	19 Mayıs Stadium, Samsun
Sunday		Report

27 April 1980 Round 27	Mersin İdmanyurdu	4 – 0	Giresunspor	Tevfik Sırrı Gür Stadium, Mersin
Sunday	Mücellip Pehlivan 7' (H); Nevzat 54' (F); Mücellip Pehlivan 65' (H); Özcan Kızıltan 84' (F)	Report		Referee: Nihat Gürşen

4 May 1980 Round 28	Boluspor	2 – 0	Mersin İdmanyurdu	City Stadium, Bolu
Sunday		Report

11 May 1980 Round 29	Mersin İdmanyurdu	0 – 0	Ankara Demirspor	Tevfik Sırrı Gür Stadium, Mersin
Sunday		Report		Referee: Ekrem Yenci

18 May 1980 Round 30	MKE Kırıkkalespor	3 – 0	Mersin İdmanyurdu	Fikret Karabudak Stadium, Kırıkkale
Sunday		Report

=== Championship match ===
Mersin İdmanyurdu lost the second league championship game against Kocaelispor, the Group B's winner.

21 May 1980 2nd League; Championship	Kocaelispor	2 – 2 (a.e.t.) (4 – 2 p)	Mersin İdmanyurdu	19 Mayıs Stadium, Ankara
16:00	Güvenç Kurtar 27'; Ceyhun Güray 83'	Report	30' Özcan Kızıltan; 73' Raşit Karasu	Referee: Hilmi Ok
	Penalties
	Kamil Özteser (penalty scored); Mustafa Çapanoğlu (penalty scored); Güvenç Kurtar (penalty scored); Mahir Danabay (penalty scored)		(penalty missed) Feridun Alkan; (penalty scored) Raşit Karasu; (penalty scored) Osman Öngen; (penalty missed) Mehmet Ali Karakuş

== 1979–80 Turkish Cup participation ==
1979–80 Turkish Cup was played for the 18th season as Türkiye Kupası by 123 teams. First four elimination rounds were played in one-leg elimination system. Fifth and sixth elimination rounds and finals were played in two-legs elimination system. Mersin İdmanyurdu participated in 1979–80 Turkish Cup and was eliminated at round 3 by MKE Kırıkkalespor. Kırıkkalespor was eliminated at round 5. Altay won the Cup for the 2nd time and became eligible for 1981–82 European Cup Winners' Cup.

=== Cup track ===
The drawings and results Mersin İdmanyurdu (MİY) followed in 1979–80 Turkish Cup are shown in the following table.

Round	Own League	Opponent's League	Opponent	A/H	Score	Result
Round 3	Second League Group A	Second League Group A	MKE Kırıkkalespor	H	0–0 (pen. 2–4)	Eliminated

Note: In the above table 'Score' shows For and Against goals whether the match played at home or not.

=== Game details ===
Mersin İdmanyurdu (MİY) 1979–80 Turkish Cup game reports is shown in the following table. Kick off times are in EET and EEST.

10 October 1979 Round 3	Mersin İdmanyurdu	0 – 0 (a.e.t.) (2 – 4 p)	MKE Kırıkkalespor	Tevfik Sırrı Gür Stadium, Mersin
Wednesday, 14:30		Report

Source: 1979–80 Turkish Cup pages.

== Management ==
=== Club management ===
Hadi Doğan was club president.

=== Coaching team ===
1979–80 Mersin İdmanyurdu head coaches:

Nat	Head coach	Period	Pl	W	D	L	Notes
(Turkey)	Suat Mamat	01.08.1979 – 31.05.1980					

Note: Only official games were included.

== 1979–80 squad ==
Stats are counted for 1979–80 Second League matches and 1979–80 Turkish Cup (Türkiye Kupası) matches. In the team rosters five substitutes were allowed to appear, two of whom were substitutable. Only the players who appeared in game rosters were included and listed in the order of appearance.

O	N	Nat	Name	Birth	Born	Pos	LA	LG	CA	CG	TA	TG	Booked	Sent off (straight red)	← Season Notes →
1	1	(Turkey)	Salih Sayar	25 May 1957	Istanbul	GK									1979 ST S.Sirkeci.
2	2	(Turkey)	Nevzat			DF									
3	3	(Turkey)	Tahir Temur	1954	Istanbul	DF									→ previous season.
4	4	(Turkey)	Kemal Damkal	1950	Adana	DF									→ previous season.
5	5	(Turkey)	Osman Öngen	19 Jan 1954	Adana	DF									→ previous season.
6	6	(Turkey)	M. Ali Karakuş	25 Nov 1957	Erzincan	FW									→ previous season.
7	7	(Turkey)	Haydar			FW									→ previous season.
8	8	(Turkey)	Feridun Alkan			DF									→ previous season.
9	9	(Turkey)	Özcan Kızıltan	12 Jul 1959	Istanbul	MF									→ previous season.
10	10	(Turkey)	İbrahim Arayıcı	1949	Silifke	FW									→ previous season.
11	11	(Turkey)	Sinan			FW									
12	12	(Turkey)	Atıf Öztoprak	8 May 1952	Sakarya	GK									→ previous season.
13	13	(Turkey)	Mücellip Pehlivan	1 Aug 1954	Lüleburgaz	FW									→ previous season.
14	14	(Turkey)	Kazım Renk			FW									1979 ST.
15	15	(Turkey)	Kenan Aydın	28 May 1959	Adana	DF									1979 ST.
16	16	(Turkey)	Bülent												
17	17	(Turkey)	Sabri												
18	6	(Turkey)	Nazif			MF									
19	13	(Turkey)	Mehmet Şilan	17 Dec 1955	Mersin	FW									→ previous season.
20	6	(Turkey)	Nasır Belci	1 Dec 1955	Adana	DF									→ previous season.
21	11	(Turkey)	Raşit Karasu	31 Oct 1950	Istanbul	MF									1979 ST A.Demirspor.
22	6	(Turkey)	Özer			FW									

Sources: 1979–80 season squad data from maçkolik com, Milliyet, and Cem Pekin Archives.

Transfer news from Milliyet:

- Transfers in: Raşit (Adana Demirspor).

MİY forward İbrahim ended his player career in the mid-season. In his jubilee match MİY lost to Galatasaray. This match was also a preparation match for the teams:

- Mid season friendly game - 13.01.1980 - MİY-Galatasaray: 0-1. On 5th minute İbrahim left his place and jersey no. 9 to Mücellip.

== See also ==
- Football in Turkey
