= 1978–79 Mersin İdmanyurdu season =

Mersin İdmanyurdu
1978–79 season
- President: Atilla Perşembe
- Coach: (Romania) Octavian Popescu
- Stadium: Mersin, Turkey
- Second League: Red Group: 6th
- Turkish Cup: Eliminated at R4
Home colours	Away colours	Third colours

Mersin İdmanyurdu (also Mersin İdman Yurdu, Mersin İY, or MİY) Sports Club; located in Mersin, east Mediterranean coast of Turkey in 1978–79. Mersin İdmanyurdu had relegated from First League in 1977–78 season. It was the second relegation of the team after 2 seasons appearances in first league (9 in total). Mersin appointed coach Octavian Popescu. The 1978–79 season was the 7th season of Mersin İdmanyurdu (MİY) football team in Second League, the second level division in Turkey. They finished 6th in the Red Group.

== Pre-season ==
Preparation games:

- 13.08.1978 - Konya İdmanyurdu-MİY: 0-3.
- 16.08.1978 - MİY-Konya İdmanyurdu: 2-0.
- 20.08.1978 - MİY-Zonguldakspor: 2-1.

== 1978–79 Second League participation ==
The (1978–79) was 16th season of Second League. The league was played with 32 teams, 16 in Red Group and 16 in White Group. Group winners promoted to First League 1979–80 in each group. Runners-up of two groups played a play-off game and winner promoted to first league as well. Last two teams in each group relegated to Third League 1979–80. Mersin İY became 6th with 9 wins and 28 goals in Red Group.

=== Results summary ===
Mersin İdmanyurdu (MİY) 1978–79 Second League Red Group league summary:

	Overall									Home								Away							
Stage	Pc	Pl	W	D	L	GF	GA	GD	Pt	Pl	W	D	L	GF	GA	GD	Pt	Pl	W	D	L	GF	GA	GD	Pt
First half	7	15	2	10	3	12	12	0	14	7	2	4	1	8	3	+5	8	8	0	6	2	4	9	-5	6
Second half		15	7	2	6	16	14	+2	16	8	7	1	0	13	2	+11	15	7	0	1	6	3	12	-9	1
Overall	6	30	9	12	9	28	26	+2	30	15	9	5	1	21	5	+16	23	15	0	7	8	7	21	-14	7

Sources: 1978–79 Turkish Second Football League pages.

=== League table ===
Mersin İY's league performance in Second League Red Group in 1978–79 season is shown in the following table.

Pc	Team	Games				Goals		Pts	Home			Away		
Pc	Team	Pl	W	D	L	F	A	Pts	F–A	R	Pc	F–A	R	Pc
1	Gaziantepspor (C) (P)	30	20	8	2	42	12	48	0–1	7	6	0–1	22	7
2	Kayserispor (Q) (P)	30	19	5	6	63	22	43	4–0	2	2	1–4	17	8
3	Antalyaspor	30	10	14	6	29	22	34	1–0	23	7	2–2	8	5
4	Düzcespor	30	11	12	7	25	21	34	0–0	12	6	0–1	27	7
5	Kocaelispor	30	13	7	10	41	42	33	1–0	28	6	1–4	13	6
6	Mersin İdmanyurdu	30	9	12	9	28	26	30	–	–	–	–	–	–
7	Edirnespor	30	11	8	11	29	29	30	1–0	16	6	0–0	1	11
8	Denizlispor	30	9	10	11	22	24	28	1–0	21	7	1–1	6	3
9	Eskişehir Demirspor	30	11	5	14	30	32	27	1–1	14	6	0–2	29	7
10	Balıkesirspor	30	8	11	11	24	28	27	1–1	9	6	2–3	24	8
11	Sarıyer	30	8	11	11	26	32	27	2–2	18	8	0–0	3	2
12	DÇ Karabükspor	30	9	9	12	25	31	27	2–0	5	2	0–1	20	8
13	Urfaspor	30	8	10	12	21	35	26	1–0	25	6	0–0	10	6
14	Bandırmaspor	30	9	9	12	25	31	25	1–0	19	7	0–0	4	4
15	Gençlerbirliği (R)	30	9	4	17	20	29	22	0–0	11	6	0–0	26	6
16	Konyaspor (R)	30	5	7	18	15	49	17	5–0	30	6	0–2	15	7

Note: Won, drawn and lost points are 2, 1 and 0. F belongs to MİY and A belongs to corresponding team for both home and away matches.

=== Results by round ===
Results of games MİY played in 1978–79 Second League Red Group by rounds:

Round	1	2	3	4	5	6	7	8	9	10	11	12	13	14	15	16	17	18	19	20	21	22	23	24	25	26	27	28	29	30
Ground	A	H	A	A	H	A	H	A	H	A	H	H	A	H	A	H	A	H	H	A	H	A	H	A	H	A	A	H	A	H
Result	D	W	D	D	W	D	L	D	D	D	D	D	L	D	L	W	L	D	W	L	W	L	W	L	W	D	L	W	L	W
Position	11	2	2	4	2	3	6	5	6	6	6	6	6	6	7	6	8	8	7	8	7	7	7	8	6	6	7	6	7	6

Source: 1978–79 Turkish Second Football League pages.
A = Away; H = Home; W = Win; D = Draw; L = Loss

=== First half ===
3 September 1978 Round 1	Edirnespor	0 – 0	Mersin İdmanyurdu	City Stadium, Edirne
Sunday		Report

10 September 1978 Round 2	Mersin İdmanyurdu	4 – 0	Kayserispor	Tevfik Sırrı Gür Stadium, Mersin
Sunday, 16:00		Report

17 September 1978 Round 3	Sarıyer	0 – 0	Mersin İdmanyurdu	Şeref Stadium, Beşiktaş, Istanbul
Sunday, 17:00		Report		Referee: Orhan Tarhan

24 September 1978 Round 4	Bandırmaspor	0 – 0	Mersin İdmanyurdu	City Stadium, Bandırma, Balıkesir
Sunday		Report

1 October 1978 Round 5	Mersin İdmanyurdu	2 – 0	Karabükspor	Tevfik Sırrı Gür Stadium, Mersin
Sunday, 14:00		Report

8 October 1978 Round 6	Denizlispor	1 – 1	Mersin İdmanyurdu	City Stadium, Denizli
Sunday		Report

15 October 1978 Round 7	Mersin İdmanyurdu	0 – 1	Gaziantepspor	Tevfik Sırrı Gür Stadium, Mersin
Sunday		Report

22 October 1978 Round 8	Antalyaspor	2 – 2	Mersin İdmanyurdu	City Stadium, Antalya
Sunday, 15:00		Report

29 October 1978 Round 9	Mersin İdmanyurdu	1 – 1	Balıkesirspor	Tevfik Sırrı Gür Stadium, Mersin
Sunday, 15:00		Report

5 November 1978 Round 10	Urfaspor	0 – 0	Mersin İdmanyurdu	City Stadium, Şanlıurfa
Sunday		Report

12 November 1978 Round 11	Mersin İdmanyurdu	0 – 0	Gençlerbirliği	Tevfik Sırrı Gür Stadium, Mersin
Sunday		Report

19 November 1978 Round 12	Mersin İdmanyurdu	0 – 0	Düzcespor	Tevfik Sırrı Gür Stadium, Mersin
Sunday		Report

26 November 1978 Round 13	Kocaelispor	4 – 1	Mersin İdmanyurdu	İsmetpaşa Stadium, İzmit, Kocaeli
Sunday		Report

3 December 1978 Round 14	Mersin İdmanyurdu	1 – 1	Eskişehir Demirspor	Tevfik Sırrı Gür Stadium, Mersin
Sunday		Report

17 December 1978 Round 15	Konyaspor	2 – 0	Mersin İdmanyurdu	City Stadium, Konya
Sunday, 13:30		Report

=== Mid-season ===
- 28.01.1979 - MİY-Adana Demirspor. Sunday, 15:30. Tevfik Sırrı Gür Stadium, Mersin. Goalkeeper Aydın Tohumcu's jubilee match.

=== Second half ===
18 February 1979 Round 16	Mersin İdmanyurdu	1 – 0	Edirnespor	Tevfik Sırrı Gür Stadium, Mersin
Sunday, 15:00		Report

25 February 1979 Round 17	Kayserispor	4 – 1	Mersin İdmanyurdu	City Stadium, Kayseri
Sunday		Report

4 March 1979 Round 18	Mersin İdmanyurdu	2 – 2	Sarıyer	Tevfik Sırrı Gür Stadium, Mersin
Sunday	Tahir Temur 27'; Mücellip Pehlivan 48'	Report	44' (F) Garo Hamamcıoğlu; 58' Ali Raik Erüstün	Referee: Ali Güllüpınar

11 March 1979 Round 19	Mersin İdmanyurdu	1 – 0	Bandırmaspor	Tevfik Sırrı Gür Stadium, Mersin
Sunday		Report

18 March 1979 Round 20	Karabükspor	1 – 0	Mersin İdmanyurdu	City Stadium, Karabük
Sunday		Report

25 March 1975 Round 21	Mersin İdmanyurdu	1 – 0	Denizlispor	Tevfik Sırrı Gür Stadium, Mersin
Sunday		Report

1 April 1979 Round 22	Gaziantepspor	1 – 0	Mersin İdmanyurdu	Kamil Ocak Stadium, Gaziantep
Sunday	Murat Kandil 28' (pen.)	Report		Referee: İbrahim Acar

8 April 1979 Round 23	Mersin İdmanyurdu	1 – 0	Antalyaspor	Tevfik Sırrı Gür Stadium, Mersin
Sunday		Report

15 April 1979 Round 24	Balıkesirspor	3 – 2	Mersin İdmanyurdu	Atatürk Stadium, Balıkesir
Sunday		Report

22 April 1979 Round 25	Mersin İdmanyurdu	1 – 0	Urfaspor	Tevfik Sırrı Gür Stadium, Mersin
Sunday		Report

29 April 1979 Round 26	Gençlerbirliği	0 – 0	Mersin İdmanyurdu	19 Mayıs Stadium, Ankara
Sunday		Report

6 May 1979 Round 27	Düzcespor	1 – 0	Mersin İdmanyurdu	City Stadium, Düzce, Bolu
Sunday		Report

13 May 1979 Round 28	Mersin İdmanyurdu	1 – 0	Kocaelispor	Tevfik Sırrı Gür Stadium, Mersin
Sunday, 15:30		Report

20 May 1979 Round 29	Eskişehir Demirspor	2 – 0	Mersin İdmanyurdu	Atatürk Stadium, Eskişehir
Sunday, 13:30	Serdar 26'	Report	13' Feridun Alkan	Referee: Sadi Altınok

27 May 1979 Round 30	Mersin İdmanyurdu	5 – 0	Konyaspor	Tevfik Sırrı Gür Stadium, Mersin
Sunday, 15:30		Report

== 1978–79 Turkish Cup participation ==
1978–79 Turkish Cup was played for the 17th season as Türkiye Kupası by 122 teams. First, four elimination rounds were played in one-leg elimination system. Fifth and sixth elimination rounds and finals were played in the two-legs elimination system. Mersin İdmanyurdu participated in 1978–79 Turkish Cup from round 3 and was eliminated at round 4 by Ankaragücü. Ankaragücü was eliminated at round 6. Fenerbahçe won the Cup for the 3rd time and became eligible for 1979–80 European Cup Winners' Cup.

=== Cup track ===
The drawings and results Mersin İdmanyurdu (MİY) followed in 1978–79 Turkish Cup are shown in the following table.

Round	Own League	Opponent's League	Opponent	A/H	Score	Result
Round 3	Second League Red Group	Second League Red Group	Urfaspor	H	1–0	Promoted to R4
Round 4	Second League Red Group	First League	Ankaragücü	A	0–1	Eliminated

Note: In the above table 'Score' shows For and Against goals whether the match played at home or not.

=== Game details ===
Mersin İdmanyurdu (MİY) 1978–79 Turkish Cup game reports is shown in the following table. Kick off times are in EET and EEST.

20 September 1978 Round 3	Mersin İdmanyurdu	1 – 0	Urfaspor	Tevfik Sırrı Gür Stadium, Mersin
Wednesday, 14:30		Report

4 October 1978 Round 4	Ankaragücü	1 – 0	Mersin İdmanyurdu	Cebeci İnönü Stadium, Ankara
Wednesday, 15:30		Report

Source: 1978–79 Turkish Cup pages.

MİY amateur team was also participated and eliminated to Tarsus İdmanyurdu:

- R2 - 10.09.1970 - Tarsus İdmanyurdu (3)-MİY (A): 5-0.

10 September 1078 Round 2	Tarsus İdmanyurdu	4 – 0	Mersin İdmanyurdu (Amateur)	City Stadium, Tarsus, Mersin
Sunday, 14:30		Report

== Management ==
=== Club management ===
Atilla Perşembe was club president.

=== Coaching team ===
1978–79 Mersin İdmanyurdu head coaches:

Nat	Head coach	Period	Pl	W	D	L	Notes
(Turkey)		01.08.1978 – 31.05.1979					

Note: Only official games were included.

== 1978–79 squad ==
Stats are counted for 1978–79 Second League matches and 1978–79 Turkish Cup (Türkiye Kupası) matches. In the team rosters five substitutes were allowed to appear, two of whom were substitutable. Only the players who appeared in game rosters were included and listed in the order of appearance.

O	N	Nat	Name	Birth	Born	Pos	LA	LG	CA	CG	TA	TG	Booked	Sent off (straight red)	← Season Notes →
1	1	(Turkey)	Atıf Öztoprak	8 May 1952	Sakarya	GK									→ previous season.
2	2	(Turkey)	Tahir Temur	1954	Istanbul	DF									→ previous season.
3	3	(Turkey)	Mehmet Dayan	1951	Balıkesir	DF									→ previous season.
4	4	(Turkey)	İbrahim Arayıcı	1949	Silifke	FW									→ previous season.
5	5	(Turkey)	Temel			MF									
6	6	(Turkey)	Osman Öngen	19 Jan 1954	Adana	DF									1978 ST.
7	7	(Turkey)	Nasır Belci	1 Dec 1955	Adana	DF									→ previous season.
8	8	(Turkey)	Özcan Kızıltan	12 Jul 1959	Istanbul	MF									First time professional.
9	9	(Turkey)	Mücellip Pehlivan	1 Aug 1954	Lüleburgaz	FW									1978 ST Lüleburgazspor.
10	10	(Turkey)	Haydar			FW									
11	11	(Turkey)	Ercan			FW									
12	1	(Turkey)	Ali			FW									
13	5	(Turkey)	Kemal Damkal	1950	Adana	DF									→ previous season.
14	7	(Turkey)	Mehmet Ali Karakuş	25 Nov 1957	Erzincan	FW									1978 ST.
15	8	(Turkey)	Feridun Alkan			DF									→ previous season.
16	11	(Turkey)	Celal			FW									
17	11	(Turkey)	Muzaffer			FW									
18	5	(Turkey)	Nevzat			DF									
19	2	(Turkey)	Bülent			DF									
20	10	(Turkey)	Bülent Taşucu	1948	Mersin	FW									→ previous season.

Sources: 1978–79 season squad data from maçkolik com, Milliyet, and Cem Pekin Archives.

== See also ==
- Football in Turkey
