= 1977–78 Mersin İdmanyurdu season =

Mersin İdmanyurdu
1977–78 season
- President: Turhan Lokmanoğlu
- Coach: (Turkey) Orhan Yüksel
- Stadium: Mersin, Turkey
- First League: 16th
- Turkish Cup: Eliminated at R3
| Home colours | Away colours | Third colours |

Mersin İdmanyurdu (also Mersin İdman Yurdu, Mersin İY, or MİY) Sports Club; located in Mersin, east Mediterranean coast of Turkey in 1977–78. The 1977–78 season was the sixth season of Mersin İdmanyurdu (MİY) football team in First League, the first level division in Turkey. They have relegated to second division at the end of the season. It was the second relegation from first division after 1973–74. Team's bad performance continued in Cup matches as well.

The team started the season with coach Kadri Aytaç. However Aytaç left the club and became the manager of Rizespor after the 7th round. Trainers Seyfi Alanya and Turgut Kafkas managed the team for the rest of the first half games. Orhan Yüksel became the coach at the start of the second half of the season. Yüksel completed the season.

== Pre-season ==
The team has prepared for the season at Uludağ. Preparation games:

- 07.08.1977 - Balıkesirspor-MİY: 3-0.
- The team played two jubilee matches on 10 August for Garay from Adana Demirspor and Güray from MİY on 17 August.
- 18.08.1977 - MİY-Gaziantepspor: 1-1.

== 1977–78 First League participation ==
First League was played with 16 teams in its 21st season, 1977–78. Last two teams relegated to Second League 1978–79. Mersin İY finished 16th with 3 wins and relegated to second division next year. It was worst season of the team in First League.

=== Results summary ===
Mersin İdmanyurdu (MİY) 1977–78 First League summary:

| | Overall | | | | | | | | | Home | | | | | | | | Away | | | | | | | |
| Stage | Pc | Pl | W | D | L | GF | GA | GD | Pt | Pl | W | D | L | GF | GA | GD | Pt | Pl | W | D | L | GF | GA | GD | Pt |
|---|---|---|---|---|---|---|---|---|---|---|---|---|---|---|---|---|---|---|---|---|---|---|---|---|---|
| First half | 16 | 15 | 2 | 6 | 7 | 11 | 21 | -10 | 10 | 8 | 2 | 4 | 2 | 5 | 5 | 0 | 8 | 7 | 0 | 2 | 5 | 6 | 16 | -10 | 2 |
| Second half | | 15 | 1 | 9 | 5 | 8 | 13 | -5 | 11 | 7 | 1 | 5 | 1 | 6 | 6 | 0 | 7 | 8 | 0 | 4 | 4 | 2 | 7 | -5 | 4 |
| Overall | 16 | 30 | 3 | 15 | 12 | 19 | 34 | -15 | 21 | 15 | 3 | 9 | 3 | 11 | 11 | 0 | 15 | 15 | 0 | 6 | 9 | 8 | 23 | -15 | 6 |

Sources: 1977–78 Turkish First Football League pages.

=== League table ===
Mersin İY's league performance in First League in 1977–78 season is shown in the following table.

| Pos | Team | Pld | W | D | L | GF | GA | GD | Pts | Qualification or relegation |
|---|---|---|---|---|---|---|---|---|---|---|
| 12 | Eskişehirspor | 30 | 6 | 13 | 11 | 24 | 28 | −4 | 25 | |
| 13 | Adana Demirspor | 30 | 7 | 11 | 12 | 24 | 36 | −12 | 25 | |
| 14 | Samsunspor | 30 | 8 | 8 | 14 | 26 | 36 | −10 | 24 | |
| 15 | MKE Ankaragücü (R) | 30 | 8 | 6 | 16 | 21 | 31 | −10 | 22 | Relegation to Turkish Second Football League |
| 16 | Mersin İdman Yurdu (R) | 30 | 3 | 15 | 12 | 18 | 34 | −16 | 21 | Relegation to Turkish Second Football League |

Rules for classification: 1) points; 2) goal difference; 3) number of goals scored.
(R) Relegated

Won, drawn and lost points are 2, 1 and 0. F belongs to MİY and A belongs to corresponding team for both home and away matches.

=== Results by round ===
Results of games MİY played in 1977–78 First League by rounds:

| Round | 1 | 2 | 3 | 4 | 5 | 6 | 7 | 8 | 9 | 10 | 11 | 12 | 13 | 14 | 15 | 16 | 17 | 18 | 19 | 20 | 21 | 22 | 23 | 24 | 25 | 26 | 27 | 28 | 29 | 30 |
|---|---|---|---|---|---|---|---|---|---|---|---|---|---|---|---|---|---|---|---|---|---|---|---|---|---|---|---|---|---|---|
| Ground | H | A | H | H | A | H | A | H | A | H | A | A | H | A | H | A | H | A | A | H | A | H | A | H | A | H | H | A | H | A |
| Result | D | L | W | W | L | D | D | D | L | L | L | D | D | L | L | L | D | D | D | D | L | D | L | D | D | D | L | D | W | L |
| Position | 9 | 14 | 11 | 5 | 8 | 9 | 9 | 10 | 12 | 14 | 15 | 14 | 14 | 16 | 16 | 16 | 16 | 16 | 16 | 16 | 16 | 16 | 16 | 16 | 15 | 16 | 16 | 16 | 16 | 16 |

Source: 1977–78 Turkish First Football League pages.
A = Away; H = Home; W = Win; D = Draw; L = Loss

=== First half ===
| 28 August 1977 Round 1 | Mersin İdmanyurdu | 0 – 0 | Trabzonspor | Tevfik Sırrı Gür Stadium, Mersin |
| Sunday, 17:00 | Müjdat Karanfilci (yellow card) 84' | Report | | Attendance: Full; Referee: Hilmi Ok |

| 3 September 1977 Round 2 | Fenerbahçe | 5 – 2 | Mersin İdmanyurdu | İnönü Stadium, Beşiktaş, Istanbul |
| Saturday, 17:00 | Önder Mustafaoğlu 4' (F); Cemil Turan 9' (F); Alpaslan Eratlı 26' (F); Cemil Turan 54' (F); Radomir Antić (yellow card) 51'; Alpaslan Eratlı (yellow card) 74' | Report | 30' (F) Feridun Alkan; 64' (H) Zeki Temizer; 89' (o.g.) Erman Toroğlu | Attendance: 35.516; Referee: Orhan Cebe |

| 11 September 1977 Round 3 | Mersin İdmanyurdu | 1 – 0 | Samsunspor | Tevfik Sırrı Gür Stadium, Mersin |
| Sunday, 16:00 | Müjdat Karanfilci 51' | Report | | Referee: Yılmaz Dinçel |

| 25 September 1977 Round 4 | Mersin İdmanyurdu | 1 – 0 | Ankaragücü | Tevfik Sırrı Gür Stadium, Mersin |
| Sunday, 15:45 | Zeki Temizer 29'; Tahir Temur (yellow card) 53'; Erman Toroğlu (yellow card) 77' | Report | (yellow card) 42' Sadık İşcanoğlu; (yellow card) 79' Taner Kalender | Referee: Fehmi Pazarcı |

| 2 October 1977 Round 5 | Orduspor | 2 – 0 | Mersin İdmanyurdu | 19 Eylül Stadium, Ordu |
| Sunday, 14:45 | Seçkin Türközer 52' (pen.); Kemal Yıldırım 85' | Report | 48' Feridun Alkan | Attendance: Low; Referee: Abdülkadir Aypek |

| 9 October 1977 Round 6 | Mersin İdmanyurdu | 1 – 1 | Galatasaray | Tevfik Sırrı Gür Stadium, Mersin |
| Sunday, 14:45 | Müjdat Karanfilci 30' (F) | Report | 87' Mehmet Özgül; (yellow card) 8' Şükrü Tetik; (yellow card) 68' Mehmet Özgül | Attendance: 20.000; Referee: Yılmaz Önen |

| 16 October 1977 Round 7 | Altay | 0 – 0 | Mersin İdmanyurdu | Alsancak Stadium, İzmir |
| Sunday, 15:15 | Çetin Aslan (yellow card) 80' | Report | (yellow card) 35' Tahir Temur; (yellow card) 80' Feridun Alkan | Referee: Doğan Babacan |

| 6 November 1977 Round 8 | Mersin İdmanyurdu | 0 – 0 | Adanaspor | Tevfik Sırrı Gür Stadium, Mersin |
| Sunday, 13:30 | | Report | (yellow card) 48' Timuçin Çuğ; (yellow card) 59' Erhan Arslan | Attendance: Full; Referee: Nihat Özbirgül |

| 20 November 1977 Round 9 | Beşiktaş | 4 – 1 | Mersin İdmanyurdu | İnönü Stadium, Beşiktaş, Istanbul |
| Sunday, 14:15 | Mustafa Kaplakaslan 11'; Reşit Kaynak 51'; Yaşar Elmas 55' (o.g.); Zekeriya Alp 68'; Ahmet Börtücene 86' | Report | (yellow card) 35' Mehmet Şilan; (yellow card) 53' Müjdat Karanfilci | Attendance: 11.792; Referee: Ertuğrul Aybay |

| 4 December 1977 Round 10 | Mersin İdmanyurdu | 1 – 2 | Diyarbakırspor | Tevfik Sırrı Gür Stadium, Mersin |
| Sunday, 13:30 | Şeref Başoğlu 84' | Report | 70' Muhittin Köymen; 88' Vahdet Yılmaz | Referee: Yavuz Tunç |

| 10 December 1977 Round 11 | Bursaspor | 2 – 1 | Mersin İdmanyurdu | Atatürk Stadium, Bursa |
| Saturday, 14:15 | Orhan Kırıkçılar 37'; Sedat Özden 47' | Report | 48' Hikmet Erön | Attendance: 10.000; Referee: Cumhur Demir |

| 18 December 1977 Round 12 | Adana Demirspor | 1 – 1 | Mersin İdmanyurdu | City Stadium, Adana |
| Sunday, 13:30 | Raşit Karasu 32' (pen.); Nezihi Tosuncuk (yellow card) 26' | Report | 72' Müjdat Karanfilci | Referee: Hilmi Ok |

| 25 December 1977 Round 13 | Mersin İdmanyurdu | 0 – 0 | Zonguldakspor | Tevfik Sırrı Gür Stadium, Mersin |
| Sunday, 13:30 | | Report | | Referee: Yılmaz Önen |

| 1 January 1978 Round 14 | Eskişehirspor | 2 – 0 | Mersin İdmanyurdu | Atatürk Stadium, Eskişehir |
| Sunday, 13:45 | Nejat Dinçer 28'; Burhan Tözer 37' | Report | (yellow card) 52' İbrahim Arayıcı | Referee: Emin Tuncalı |

| 8 January 1978 Round 15 | Mersin İdmanyurdu | 1 – 2 | Boluspor | Tevfik Sırrı Gür Stadium, Mersin |
| Sunday, 13:30 | Müjdat Karanfilci 49' | Report | 57' Halil İbrahim Eren; 79' Halil İbrahim Eren | Referee: Fehmi Pazarcı |

=== Second half ===
| 19 February 1978 Round 16 | Trabzonspor | 2 – 0 | Mersin İdmanyurdu | City Stadium, Trabzon |
| Sunday, 13:15 | Serdar Bali 48' (F); Kadir Özcan 51' (pen.); Serdar Bali (yellow card) 55' | Report | | Referee: İhsan Türe |

| 26 February 1978 Round 17 | Mersin İdmanyurdu | 2 – 2 | Fenerbahçe | Tevfik Sırrı Gür Stadium, Mersin |
| Sunday, 13:45 | Müjdat Karanfilci 17' (F); Müjdat Karanfilci 44' (F); Kemal Damkal (yellow card) 29'; Zeki Temizer (yellow card) 44'; Tahir Temur (yellow card) 69'; İbrahim Arayıcı (yellow card) 87' | Report | 36' (pen.) Cemil Turan; 59' (F) Engin Verel; (yellow card) 36' Radomir Antić; (red card) 24' Coşkun Demirbakan | Attendance: 22.000; Referee: Yavuz Tunç |

| 5 March 1978 Round 18 | Samsunspor | 0 – 0 | Mersin İdmanyurdu | 19 Mayıs Stadium, Samsun |
| Sunday, 14:15 | | Report | (yellow card) 66' Feridun Alkan | Attendance: 20.000; Referee: Ertuğrul Dilek |

| 12 March 1978 Round 19 | Ankaragücü | 1 – 1 | Mersin İdmanyurdu | 19 Mayıs Stadium, Ankara |
| Sunday, 14:45 | Köksal Mesci 90'; Adil Eriç (red card) 90' | Report | 15' (pen.) Müjdat Karanfilci; (red card) 80' Selçuk Yalçıntaş | Referee: Hilmi Ok |

| 19 March 1978 Round 20 | Mersin İdmanyurdu | 1 – 1 | Orduspor | Tevfik Sırrı Gür Stadium, Mersin |
| Sunday, 14:45 | Mehmet Şilan 62' | Report | 40' Kemal Yıldırım | Attendance: Full; Referee: Müşfik Talas |

| 26 March 1978 Round 21 | Galatasaray | 2 – 1 | Mersin İdmanyurdu | İnönü Stadium, Istanbul |
| Sunday, 15:00 | Gökmen Özdenak 20' (pen.); Güngör Tekin 76' (H); Gökmen Özdenak (yellow card) 58' | Report | 65' (F) Hikmet Erön; (yellow card) 22' Tahir Temur; (yellow card) 44' Mehmet Şilan; (yellow card) 69' Kemal Damkal | Attendance: 13.724; Referee: Yavuz Tunç |

| 2 April 1978 Round 22 | Mersin İdmanyurdu | 0 – 0 | Altay | Tevfik Sırrı Gür Stadium, Mersin |
| Sunday, 16:00 | | Report | | Referee: Erdoğan Albay |

| 9 April 1978 Round 23 | Adanaspor | 1 – 0 | Mersin İdmanyurdu | City Stadium, Adana |
| Sunday 16:00 | Günay Haznedaroğlu 65'; Halis Tufan (yellow card) 51'; İsa Ertürk (yellow card) 86' | Report | (yellow card) 39' İbrahim Arayıcı | Attendance: Full; Referee: İsmail Hendek |

| 16 April 1978 Round 24 | Mersin İdmanyurdu | 0 – 0 | Beşiktaş | Tevfik Sırrı Gür Stadium, Mersin |
| Sunday, 16:00 | İbrahim Arayıcı (yellow card) 32' | Report | | Referee: İhsan Türe |

| 23 April 1978 Round 25 | Diyarbakırspor | 0 – 0 | Mersin İdmanyurdu | City Stadium, Diyarbakır |
| Sunday, 15:00 | Tuncay Temeller (yellow card) 49'; Ergün Baydar (yellow card) 71' | Report | | Referee: Özer Kızıltan |

| 30 April 1978 Round 26 | Mersin İdmanyurdu | 1 – 1 | Bursaspor | Tevfik Sırrı Gür Stadium, Mersin |
| Sunday, 15:00 | Erman Toroğlu 2' | Report | 49' Sedat Özbağ | Referee: Ertuğrul Dilek |

| 7 May 1978 Round 27 | Mersin İdmanyurdu | 0 – 1 | Adana Demirspor | Tevfik Sırrı Gür Stadium, Mersin |
| Sunday, 15:00 | | Report | 71' Rasin Gürcan | Attendance: Full; Referee: Hilmi Ok |

| 14 May 1978 Round 28 | Zonguldakspor | 0 – 0 | Mersin İdmanyurdu | City Stadium, Zonguldak |
| Sunday, 16:00 | | Report | | Attendance: 8.000; Referee: Erkan Göksel |

| 21 May 1978 Round 29 | Mersin İdmanyurdu | 2 – 1 | Eskişehirspor | Tevfik Sırrı Gür Stadium, Mersin |
| Sunday, 16:00 | Nasır Belci 38'; Nasır Belci 77' | Report | 35' Hüseyin Şengül | Attendance: Low; Referee: Cumhur Demir |

| 28 May 1978 Round 30 | Boluspor | 1 – 0 | Mersin İdmanyurdu | City Stadium, Bolu |
| Sunday, 16:00 | Ahmet Taber 63'; Rıdvan Ertan (yellow card) 40' | Report | (yellow card) 40' Feridun Alkan | Attendance: Low; Referee: Emin Tuncalı |

== 1977–78 Turkish Cup participation ==
1977–78 Turkish Cup was played for the 16th season as Türkiye Kupası by 89 teams. First and second elimination rounds were played in one-leg elimination system. Third and fourth elimination rounds and finals were played in two-legs elimination system. Mersin İdmanyurdu participated in 1977–78 Turkish Cup and eliminated at round 3 by Sivasspor. Sivasspor was eliminated at round 4. Trabzonspor won the Cup for the 2nd time.

=== Cup track ===
The drawings and results Mersin İdmanyurdu (MİY) followed in 1977–78 Turkish Cup are shown in the following table.

| Round | Own League | Opponent's League | Opponent | A | H | Result |
|---|---|---|---|---|---|---|
| Round 3 | First League | Second League White Group | Sivasspor | 0–3 | 2–0 | Eliminated |

Note: In the above table 'Score' shows For and Against goals whether the match played at home or not.

=== Game details ===
Mersin İdmanyurdu (MİY) 1977–78 Turkish Cup game reports is shown in the following table. Kick off times are in EET and EEST.

| 7 December 1977 Round 3 Leg 1 | Mersin İdmanyurdu | 2 – 0 | Sivasspor | Tevfik Sırrı Gür Stadium, Mersin |
| Wednesday, 13:30 | Müjdat Karanfilci 30'; Müjdat Karanfilci 60' | Report | | Referee: Nihat Gülşen |

| 21 December 1977 Round 3 Leg 2 | Sivasspor | 3 – 0 (a.e.t.) | Mersin İdmanyurdu | 4 Eylül Stadium, Sivas |
| Wednesday, 13:00 | İlker Erdinç 2'; Burhan 38'; İlker Erdinç 116' | Report | | Referee: Lütfi Keçeli |

Source: 1977–78 Turkish Cup pages.

== Management ==
=== Club management ===
Turhan Lokmanoğlu was club president.

=== Coaching team ===
1977–78 Mersin İdmanyurdu head coaches:

| Nat | Head coach | Period | Pl | W | D | L | Notes |
|---|---|---|---|---|---|---|---|
| (Turkey) | | 01.08.1977 – 31.05.1978 | | | | | |

Note: Only official games were included.

== 1977–78 squad ==
Stats are counted for 1977–78 First League matches and 1977–78 Turkish Cup (Türkiye Kupası) matches. In the team rosters five substitutes were allowed to appear, two of whom were substitutable. Only the players who appeared in game rosters were included and listed in the order of appearance.

| O | N | Nat | Name | Birth | Born | Pos | LA | LG | CA | CG | TA | TG | Yellow card | Red card | ← Season Notes → |
|---|---|---|---|---|---|---|---|---|---|---|---|---|---|---|---|
| 1 | 1 | (Turkey) | Aydın Tohumcu | 1 Feb 1943 | Bilecik | GK | 15 | | | | 15 | | | | → previous season. |
| 2 | 2 | (Turkey) | Tahir Temur | 1954 | Istanbul | DF | 29 | | 2 | | 31 | | 4 | | → previous season. |
| 3 | 3 | (Turkey) | Erman Toroğlu | 24 Nov 1948 | Ankara | DF | 14 | 1 | | | 14 | 1 | | | 1977 ST Ankaragücü. |
| 4 | 4 | (Turkey) | Feridun Alkan | | | DF | 25 | 2 | 2 | | 27 | 2 | 3 | | → previous season. |
| 5 | 5 | (Turkey) | Mehmet Dayan | 1951 | Balıkesir | DF | 24 | | | | 24 | | | | → previous season. |
| 6 | 6 | (Turkey) | Rüçhan Dağdeviren | 1951 | Istanbul | DF | 6 | | 2 | | 8 | | | | → previous season. |
| 7 | 7 | (Turkey) | Hikmet Erön | 1948 | Istanbul | MF | 24 | 2 | 2 | | 26 | 2 | | | → previous season. |
| 8 | 8 | (Turkey) | Yalçın Tarzan | 1948 | | FW | 24 | | | | 24 | | | | → previous season. |
| 9 | 9 | (Turkey) | Erdinç Sandalcı | 1 Jul 1949 | Istanbul | FW | 4 | | 1 | | 5 | | | | 1977 ST Kayserispor. |
| 10 | 10 | (Turkey) | Müjdat Karanfilci | 28 Feb 1950 | Gelibolu | FW | 28 | 7 | 2 | 2 | 30 | 9 | 2 | | → previous season. |
| 11 | 11 | (Turkey) | İbrahim Arayıcı | 1949 | Silifke | FW | 27 | | 2 | | 29 | | 4 | | → previous season. |
| 12 | 13 | (Turkey) | Mehmet Şilan | 17 Dec 1955 | Mersin | FW | 24 | 1 | 1 | | 25 | 1 | 2 | | → previous season. |
| 13 | 1 | (Turkey) | Atıf Öztoprak | 8 May 1952 | Sakarya | GK | 17 | | 2 | | 19 | | | | → previous season. |
| 14 | 4 | (Turkey) | Kemal Damkal | 1950 | Adana | DF | 28 | | 1 | | 29 | | 2 | | → previous season. |
| 15 | 13 | (Turkey) | Zeki Temizer | 1945 | Istanbul | FW | 20 | 2 | 2 | | 22 | 2 | 1 | | → previous season. |
| 16 | 14 | (Turkey) | Erol Can | 1954 | | FW | 1 | | | | 1 | | | | 1977 ST Balıkesirspor. |
| 17 | 6 | (Turkey) | Selçuk Yalçıntaş | 1943 | Ankara | MF | 14 | | 1 | | 15 | | | 1 | 1977 ST Beşiktaş. |
| 18 | 6 | (Turkey) | Şeref Başoğu | 1947 | Adapazarı | MF | 16 | 1 | 1 | | 17 | 1 | | | → previous season. |
| 19 | 2 | (Turkey) | Nasır Belci | 1 Dec 1955 | Adana | DF | 16 | 2 | 2 | | 18 | 2 | | | → previous season. |
| 20 | 14 | (Turkey) | Oktay Akgün | 1953 | | MF | 6 | | 1 | | 7 | | | | 1977 ST Muhafızgücü. |
| 21 | 13 | (Turkey) | Bülent Taşucu | 1948 | Mersin | FW | 3 | | | | 3 | | | | First time professional. |
| 22 | 5 | (Turkey) | Tahsin | | | MF | 1 | | | | 1 | | | | |

Sources: 1977–78 season squad data from maçkolik com, Milliyet, and Cem Pekin Archives.

Transfer news from Milliyet:

- Transfers in: Erdinç (Kayserispor); Erol (Balıkesirspor), Oktay (Muhafızgücü); Nihat, Bülent (professionalized, MİY youth team); Erman, Selçuk (Ankaragücü); Mehmet, Zeki (Tirespor); Celal (Tekirdağspor); Eser (Konya Ereğlispor); Mehmet (Tarsus İdmanyurdu). Müjdat was called for national team for Bulgaria match by coach Metin Türel (13.09.1977).
- Transfers out: Rüçhan (Kırıkkalespor, who were promoted to first league); Müjdat (Adana Demirspor); Tahir (Diyarbakırspor); Hikmet (Karagümrük); Erman (Şekerspor); K.Erol (Düzcespor).

== See also ==
- Football in Turkey
