= 1974–75 Mersin İdmanyurdu season =

Mersin İdmanyurdu
1974–75 season
- President: Kaya Mutlu
- Coach: Bülent Giz
- Stadium: Mersin, Turkey
- Second League: Red group: 3rd
- Turkish Cup: Did not participate
Home colours	Away colours	Third colours

Mersin İdmanyurdu (also Mersin İdman Yurdu, Mersin İY, or MİY) Sports Club; located in Mersin, east Mediterranean coast of Turkey in 1974–75. Mersin İdmanyurdu had relegated from Turkish First Football League in 1973–74 season. It was the first relegation of the team after 7 season first league experience. The 1974–75 season was the fifth season of Mersin İdmanyurdu (MİY) football team in Turkish Second Football League, the second level division in Turkey. They finished 3rd in the red group.

== Pre-season ==
- MİY-Adana Demirspor: 0-0.
- MİY-Göztepe: 3–1.
- MİY-Gençlerbirliği: 2–0.

== 1974–75 Second League participation ==
In its 12th season (1974–75), Second League was played with 32 teams, 16 in red group and 16 in white group. Group winners promoted to First League 1975–76 and last teams relegated to Third League 1975–76 in each group. Mersin İY became 3rd with 14 wins in Red Group.

=== Results summary ===
Mersin İdmanyurdu (MİY) 1974–75 Second League Red Group league summary:

	Overall									Home								Away							
Stage	Pc	Pl	W	D	L	GF	GA	GD	Pt	Pl	W	D	L	GF	GA	GD	Pt	Pl	W	D	L	GF	GA	GD	Pt
First half	11	15	5	4	6	15	13	+2	14	7	4	1	2	10	4	+6	9	8	1	3	4	5	9	-4	5
Second half		15	9	2	4	21	10	+11	20	8	7	1	0	15	1	+14	15	7	2	1	4	6	9	-3	5
Overall	3	30	14	6	10	36	23	+13	34	15	11	2	2	25	5	+20	24	15	3	4	8	11	18	-7	10

Sources: 1974–75 Turkish Second Football League pages.

=== League table ===
Mersin İY's league performance in Second League Red Group in 1974-75 season is shown in the following table.

Pc	Team	Games				Goals		Pts	Home			Away		
Pc	Team	Pl	W	D	L	F	A	Pts	F–A	R	Pc	F–A	R	Pc
1	Orduspor (C) (P)	30	15	11	4	38	13	41	2–1	1	1	1–2	16	12
2	Gaziantepspor	30	14	10	6	31	18	38	0–0	8	14	0–2	23	4
3	Mersin İdmanyurdu	30	14	6	10	36	23	34	–	–	–	–	–	–
4	Kocaelispor	30	12	9	9	27	23	33	2–0	22	3	0–1	7	13
5	Karabükspor	30	11	11	8	21	20	33	0–0	27	3	0–1	12	14
6	Manisaspor	30	11	10	9	23	21	32	1–2	6	13	3–0	21	3
7	MKE Kırıkkalespor	30	8	13	9	29	26	29	2–0	10	13	1–2	25	4
8	Sarıyer	30	8	13	9	25	25	29	1–0	26	3	1–1	11	13
9	Malatyaspor	30	8	13	9	21	26	29	4–0	15	11	0–0	30	3
10	Antalyaspor	30	9	10	11	24	24	28	2–0	18	6	0–2	3	7
11	Sakaryaspor	30	8	12	10	20	23	28	2–0	20	3	0–1	5	13
12	Hatayspor	30	10	7	13	22	37	27	1–0	13	13	0–3	28	4
13	Konyaspor	30	9	8	13	20	32	26	0–1	4	10	1–0	19	5
14	Denizlispor	30	8	10	12	23	39	26	4–0	24	4	0–0	9	14
15	Eskişehir Demirspor	30	8	9	13	22	28	25	1–0	29	3	3–3	14	13
16	İstanbulspor (R)	30	8	6	16	21	30	22	3–1	17	10	1–0	2	1

Note: Won, drawn and lost points are 2, 1 and 0. F belongs to MİY and A belongs to corresponding team for both home and away matches.

=== Results by round ===
Results of games MİY played in 1974–75 Second League Red Group by rounds:

Round	1	2	3	4	5	6	7	8	9	10	11	12	13	14	15	16	17	18	19	20	21	22	23	24	25	26	27	28	29	30
Ground	H	A	A	H	A	H	A	H	A	H	A	A	H	A	H	A	H	H	A	H	A	H	A	H	A	H	H	A	H	A
Result	W	W	L	L	L	L	L	D	D	W	D	L	W	D	W	L	W	W	W	W	W	W	L	W	L	W	D	L	W	D
Position	1	1	7	10	13	13	13	14	14	13	13	14	13	13	11	12	10	6	5	3	3	3	4	4	4	3	3	4	3	3

Source: 1974–75 Turkish Second Football League pages.
A = Away; H = Home; W = Win; D = Draw; L = Loss

=== First half ===
22 September 1974 Round 1	Mersin İdmanyurdu	2 – 1	Orduspor	Tevfik Sırrı Gür Stadium, Mersin
Sunday, 15:30		Report

28 September 1974 Round 2	İstanbulspor	0 – 1	Mersin İdmanyurdu	İnönü Stadium, Beşiktaş, Istanbul
Saturday		Report	64' Şeref Başoğlu	Referee: Abdülkadir Aytek

6 October 1974 Round 3	Antalyaspor	2 – 0	Mersin İdmanyurdu	City Stadium, Antalya
Sunday, 16:30		Report

13 October 1974 Round 4	Mersin İdmanyurdu	0 – 1	Konyaspor	Tevfik Sırrı Gür Stadium, Mersin
Sunday		Report

20 October 1974 Round 5	Sakaryaspor	1 – 0	Mersin İdmanyurdu	City Stadium, Adapazarı, Sakarya
Sunday		Report

27 October 1974 Round 6	Mersin İdmanyurdu	1 – 2	Manisaspor	Tevfik Sırrı Gür Stadium, Mersin
Sunday		Report

3 November 1974 Round 7	Kocaelispor	1 – 0	Mersin İdmanyurdu	İsmetpaşa Stadium, İzmit, Kocaeli
Sunday		Report

9 November 1974 Round 8	Mersin İdmanyurdu	0 – 0	Gaziantepspor	Tevfik Sırrı Gür Stadium, Mersin
Saturday, 15:00		Report

24 November 1974 Round 9	Denizlispor	0 – 0	Mersin İdmanyurdu	City Stadium, Denizli
Sunday		Report

1 December 1974 Round 10	Mersin İdmanyurdu	2 – 0	MKE Kırıkkalespor	Tevfik Sırrı Gür Stadium, Mersin
Sunday		Report

7 December 1974 Round 11	Sarıyer	1 – 1	Mersin İdmanyurdu	A.S. Yen Std., Mecidiyeköy, Istanbul
Saturday, 13:45		Report

15 December 1974 Round 12	Karabükspor	1 – 0	Mersin İdmanyurdu	Yenişehir Stadium, Karabük
Sunday, 13:30		Report

29 December 1974 Round 13	Mersin İdmanyurdu	1 – 0	Hatayspor	Tevfik Sırrı Gür Stadium, Mersin
Sunday, 13:00		Report

5 January 1975 Round 14	Eskişehir Demirspor	3 – 3	Mersin İdmanyurdu	Atatürk Stadium, Eskişehir
Sunday, 13:30		Report

12 January 1975 Round 15	Mersin İdmanyurdu	4 – 0	Malatyaspor	Tevfik Sırrı Gür Stadium, Mersin
Sunday, 13:15		Report

=== Mid-season ===
Friendly game during half-season:

- MİY–Adanaspor: 2–1.
- 09.02.1975 - MİY–Mersin Demirspor.

=== Second half ===
16 February 1975 Round 16	Orduspor	2 – 1	Mersin İdmanyurdu	19 Eylül Stadium, Ordu
Sunday		Report

23 February 1975 Round 17	Mersin İdmanyurdu	3 – 1	İstanbulspor	Tevfik Sırrı Gür Stadium, Mersin
Sunday, 14:00	Zeki Temizer 49'; Burhan Çetinkaya 50'; Şeref Başoğlu 69'	Report	10' Müjdat Karanfilci	Referee: Yılgör Öktem

2 March 1975 Round 18	Mersin İdmanyurdu	2 – 0	Antalyaspor	Tevfik Sırrı Gür Stadium, Mersin
Sunday		Report

9 March 1975 Round 19	Konyaspor	0 – 1	Mersin İdmanyurdu	City Stadium, Konya
Sunday, 14:15		Report

16 March 1975 Round 20	Mersin İdmanyurdu	2 – 0	Sakaryaspor	Tevfik Sırrı Gür Stadium, Mersin
Sunday, 14:15		Report

23 March 1875 Round 21	Manisaspor	0 – 3	Mersin İdmanyurdu	19 Mayıs Stadium, Manisa
Sunday		Report

30 March 1975 Round 22	Mersin İdmanyurdu	2 – 0	Kocaelispor	Tevfik Sırrı Gür Stadium, Mersin
Sunday		Report

6 April 1975 Round 23	Gaziantepspor	2 – 0	Mersin İdmanyurdu	Kamil Ocak Stadium, Gaziantep
Sunday	Fatih Zambak 12'; Arif 89' (pen.)	Report		Referee: Hilmi Ok

13 April 1975 Round 24	Mersin İdmanyurdu	4 – 0	Denizlispor	Tevfik Sırrı Gür Stadium, Mersin
Sunday		Report

20 April 1975 Round 25	MKE Kırıkkalespor	2 – 1	Mersin İdmanyurdu	Fikret Karabudak Stadium, Kırıkkale
Sunday, 16:00		Report

27 April 1975 Round 26	Mersin İdmanyurdu	1 – 0	Sarıyer	Tevfik Sırrı Gür Stadium, Mersin
Sunday	Şeref Başoğlu 18'	Report		Referee: Ata Bahri

4 May 1975 Round 27	Mersin İdmanyurdu	0 – 0	Karabükspor	Tevfik Sırrı Gür Stadium, Mersin
Sunday, 15:30		Report

11 May 1975 Round 28	Hatayspor	3 – 0	Mersin İdmanyurdu	City Stadium, Antakya, Hatay
Sunday		Report

18 May 1975 Round 29	Mersin İdmanyurdu	1 – 0	Eskişehir Demirspor	Tevfik Sırrı Gür Stadium, Mersin
Sunday		Report

25 May 1975 Round 30	Malatyaspor	0 – 0	Mersin İdmanyurdu	City Stadium, Malatya
Sunday, 15:30		Report

== 1974–75 Turkish Cup participation ==
1974–75 Turkish Cup was played for the 13th season as Türkiye Kupası by 22 teams. Two elimination rounds and finals were played in two-legs elimination system. Top ten first division teams from previous season participated. Mersin İdmanyurdu did not participate in 1974–75 Turkish Cup because they had finished previous season at 15th place. Beşiktaş won the Cup for the first time and became eligible for 1975–76 ECW Cup.

== Management ==
=== Club management ===
Kaya Mutlu was club president.

=== Coaching team ===
1974–75 Mersin İdmanyurdu head coaches:

Nat	Head coach	Period	Pl	W	D	L	Notes
(Turkey)		01.08.1974 – 31.05.1975					

Note: Only official games were included.

== 1974–75 squad ==
Stats are counted for 1974–75 Second League matches. In the team rosters five substitutes were allowed to appear, two of whom were substitutable. Only the players who appeared in game rosters were included and listed in the order of appearance.

O	N	Nat	Name	Birth	Born	Pos	LA	LG	CA	CG	TA	TG	Booked	Sent off (straight red)	← Season Notes →
1	1	(Turkey)	Atıf Öztoprak	8 May 1952	Sakarya	GK									→ previous season.
2	2	(Turkey)	Davut Şahin	1948		FW									→ previous season.
3	3	(Turkey)	İsmail Akdağcık			DF									1974 ST Tarsus İY.
4	4	(Turkey)	Kemal Özcan	1948	Kayseri	DF		1				1			1974 ST İskenderunspor.
5	5	(Turkey)	İbrahim Arayıcı	1949	Silifke	FW									→ previous season.
6	6	(Turkey)	Metin Yılmaz	1945		MF		1				1			1974 ST Ankaragücü.
7	7	(Turkey)	Kamuran Yavuz	1947	Tekirdağ	MF									1974 ST Eskişehirspor.
8	8	(Turkey)	Doğan Küçükduru	1949	Istanbul	FW		1				1			1974 ST Göztepe.
9	9	(Turkey)	Şeref Başoğu	1947	Adapazarı	MF		7				7			→ previous season.
10	10	(Turkey)	Nevruz Şerif	22 Mar 1951	Istanbul	MF		3				3			1974 ST Şekerspor.
11	11	(Turkey)	Burhan Çetinkaya	1952	Trabzon	FW		8				8			→ previous season.
12	13	(Turkey)	Hikmet Erön	1948	Istanbul	MF									1974 ST Karagümrük.
13	2	(Turkey)	Ayhan Öz	20 Jul 1945	Mersin	FW		1				1			1974 ST Gaziantepspor.
14	9	(Turkey)	Zeki Temizer	1945	Istanbul	FW		13				13			→ previous season.
15	3	(Turkey)	Kemal Damkal	1950	Adana	DF									1974 ST Güneşspor.
16	1	(Turkey)	Fikret Özdil	1943		GK									→ previous season.
17	2	(Turkey)	Yalçın			DF									1974 ST Feriköy.
18		(Turkey)	Osman			FW		1				1			1974 ST Feriköy.
19		(Turkey)	Kasım Özyamanoğlu	1953	Tarsus	DF									1974 ST Tarsus İY.
20		(Turkey)	Levent Arıkdoğan	23 Aug 1953	Mersin	MF									→ previous season.

Sources: 1974–75 season squad data from maçkolik com, Milliyet, and Erbil (1975).

Transfer news from Milliyet:

- Transfers in (Summer 1974): MF Doğan (Göztepe); Kamuran (Eskişehirspor); Metin (Ankaragücü).
- Transfers out (summer 1975): Nevruz (Fenerbahçe).

== See also ==
- Football in Turkey
