= 1976–77 Mersin İdmanyurdu season =

Mersin İdmanyurdu
1976-77 season
- President: Burhan Kanun
- Coach: (Turkey) Kadri Aytaç
- Stadium: Mersin, Turkey
- First League: 7th
- Turkish Cup: Eliminated at R4
- Top goalscorer: Müjdat (10)
Home colours	Away colours	Third colours

Mersin İdmanyurdu (also Mersin İdman Yurdu, Mersin İY, or MİY) Sports Club; located in Mersin, east Mediterranean coast of Turkey in 1976–77. Mersin İdmanyurdu has promoted from Second League 1975–76, after two season break to first division. It was the second time the team promoted to first division. In the first time, they have remained at the league for seven season. This second promotion had let the team to stay two more seasons. The 1976–77 season was the eighth season of Mersin İdmanyurdu (MİY) football team in Turkish First Football League in total. They finished seventh in the league.

General captain was Mustafa Oğultürk (11.10.1976).

== Pre-season ==
Before the start of the league, MİY played eight preparation matches. Two matches were played with İskenderunspor in Mersin on 14 and 15 August. Then the team moved to Adana to play "Çukurova Football Tournament".

- 29.08.1976 - MİY-Adana Demirspor: 2-0.

== 1976–77 First League participation ==
First League was played with 16 teams in its 20th season, 1976–77. Winner became eligible for European Champion Clubs Cup, runner-up and third teams became eligible for UEFA Cup next season. Trabzonspor also won the Turkish Cup. Beşiktaş was the cup finalist and became eligible for European Cup Winners Cup next year. Last two teams relegated to Second League 1977-78. Mersin İY became 7th with 9 wins and 25 goals.

=== Results summary ===
Mersin İdmanyurdu (MİY) 1976–77 First League summary:

	Overall									Home								Away							
Stage	Pc	Pl	W	D	L	GF	GA	GD	Pt	Pl	W	D	L	GF	GA	GD	Pt	Pl	W	D	L	GF	GA	GD	Pt
First half	8	15	5	6	4	10	13	-3	16	7	3	3	1	6	5	+1	9	8	2	3	3	4	8	-4	7
Second half		15	4	7	4	15	13	-1	15	8	3	4	1	9	5	+4	10	7	1	3	3	6	8	-2	5
Overall	7	30	9	13	8	25	26	-1	31	15	6	7	2	15	10	+5	19	15	3	6	6	10	16	-6	12

Sources: 1976–77 Turkish First Football League pages.

=== League table ===
Mersin İY's league performance in First League in 1976–77 season is shown in the following table.

Pos	Team	Pld	W	D	L	GF	GA	GD	Pts	Qualification or relegation
5	Galatasaray	30	10	13	7	36	26	+10	33	Invitation to Balkans Cup
6	Bursaspor	30	10	11	9	34	30	+4	31	
7	Mersin İdman Yurdu	30	9	13	8	25	26	−1	31	
8	Boluspor	30	9	13	8	32	34	−2	31	
9	Eskişehirspor	30	10	10	10	25	26	−1	30	

Rules for classification: 1) points; 2) goal difference; 3) number of goals scored.

Won, drawn and lost points are 2, 1 and 0. F belongs to MİY and A belongs to corresponding team for both home and away matches. Champions went to ECC 1977–78, and runners-up and second runners-up became eligible for EUC 1977–78.

=== Results by round ===
Results of games MİY played in 1976–77 First League by rounds:

Round	1	2	3	4	5	6	7	8	9	10	11	12	13	14	15	16	17	18	19	20	21	22	23	24	25	26	27	28	29	30
Ground	H	H	A	H	A	H	A	H	A	H	A	H	A	A	A	A	A	H	A	H	A	H	A	H	A	H	H	A	H	H
Result	L	D	L	D	D	W	L	W	L	W	W	D	D	W	D	W	L	D	D	D	L	W	D	L	L	W	D	D	D	W
Position	14	13	15	14	12	12	13	10	12	10	10	9	9	8	8	6	7	9	9	9	10	10	8	11	11	9	9	9	8	7

Source: 1976–77 Turkish First Football League pages.
A = Away; H = Home; W = Win; D = Draw; L = Loss

=== First half ===
5 September 1976 Round 1	Mersin İdmanyurdu	0 – 2	Eskişehirspor	Tevfik Sırrı Gür Stadium, Mersin
Sunday, 16:00		Report	37' Burhan Tözer; 75' Mehmet Kalaycı	Referee: Erdoğan Albay

12 September 1976 Round 2	Mersin İdmanyurdu	1 – 1	Bursaspor	Tevfik Sırrı Gür Stadium, Mersin
Sunday, 16:00	Feridun Alkan 35'; Şeref Başoğlu (yellow card) 30'; İbrahim Arayıcı (yellow card) 68'	Report	55' İbrahim Ergin; (yellow card) 79' Sedat Özden	Referee: Müşfik Talas

26 September 1976 Round 3	Adana Demirspor	2 – 0	Mersin İdmanyurdu	City Stadium, Adana
Sunday, 16:00	İsmail Güner 20'; Ahmet Yılmaz 24'; Eser Özaltındere (yellow card)	Report	(yellow card) Zeki Temizer	Attendance: 12.434; Referee: Yılgör Ökten

3 October 1976 Round 4	Mersin İdmanyurdu	2 – 2	Boluspor	Tevfik Sırrı Gür Stadium, Mersin
Sunday, 15:30	İbrahim Arayıcı 59'; Zeki Temizer 62'; Ayhan Öz (yellow card); İbrahim Arayıcı (yellow card)	Report	57' Necdet Ergün; 87' Mustafa Akarcalı	Referee: Oktay Taner

10 October 1976 Round 5	Orduspor	1 – 1	Mersin İdmanyurdu	19 Eylül Stadium, Ordu
Sunday, 15:00	Orhan Kırıkçılar 89'; Seçkin Türközer (yellow card) 46'	Report	81' Müjdat Karanfilci	Referee: Orhan Cebe
Note: Orduspor received two match stadium ban due to events during the game

9 January 1977 Round 6	Mersin İdmanyurdu	1 – 0	Trabzonspor	Tevfik Sırrı Gür Stadium, Mersin
Sunday, 13:30	Ayhan Öz 80' (pen.); İbrahim Arayıcı (yellow card) 28'	Report	(yellow card) 56' Ali Kemal Denizci; (yellow card) 73' Necati Özçağlayan	Referee: Talat Tokat

24 October 1976 Round 7	Altay	3 – 0	Mersin İdmanyurdu	Alsancak Stadium, İzmir
Sunday, 15:45	Mustafa Denizli 53' (pen.); Mustafa Kaplakaslan 63'; Mustafa Denizli 72'	Report		Referee: Cumhur Demir

7 November 1976 Round 8	Mersin İdmanyurdu	1 – 0	Giresunspor	Tevfik Sırrı Gür Stadium, Mersin
Sunday, 13:45	Zeki Temizer 25'; Zeki Temizer (yellow card) 60'	Report	(yellow card) 51' Teoman Göksu; (yellow card) 77' Mazlum Fırtına; (yellow card) 84' Necdet Sarıalioğlu	Referee: Yılmaz Önen

21 November 1976 Round 9	Fenerbahçe	1 – 0	Mersin İdmanyurdu	İnönü Stadium, Beşiktaş, Istanbul
Sunday, 14:00	Engin Verel 65'	Report	(yellow card) 43' Hikmet Erön; (yellow card) 78' Doğan Küçükduru; (yellow card) 80' Zeki Temizer	Attendance: 15.522; Referee: Nihat Özbirgül

28 November 1976 Round 10	Mersin İdmanyurdu	1 – 0	Zonguldakspor	Tevfik Sırrı Gür Stadium, Mersin
Sunday, 13:15	Müjdat Karanfilci 51'	Report		Referee: Kemal Akay

5 December 1976 Round 11	Göztepe	0 – 1	Mersin İdmanyurdu	Alsancak Stadium, İzmir
Sunday, 14:00	29' Müjdat Karanfilci	Report		Attendance: Low; Referee: Ertuğrul Dilek

23 January 1977 Round 12	Samsunspor	0 – 0	Mersin İdmanyurdu	19 Mayıs Stadium, Samsun
Sunday, 14:30	Ömer Kuranel (yellow card) 34'	Report		Referee: Emin Tuncalı

19 December 1976 Round 13	Mersin İdmanyurdu	0 – 0	Galatasaray	Tevfik Sırrı Gür Stadium, Mersin
Sunday, 13:15		Report	(yellow card) 62' Bülent Ünder; (yellow card) 82' Gökmen Özdenak	Referee: Ertuğrul Aybay

26 December 1976 Round 14	Adanaspor	1 – 2	Mersin İdmanyurdu	City Stadium, Adana
Sunday, 13:15	Sinan Alayoğlu 57'	Report	23' Müjdat Karanfilci; 64' Mehmet Dayan	Referee: Ertuğrul Dilek

1 January 1977 Round 15	Beşiktaş	0 – 0	Mersin İdmanyurdu	İnönü Stadium, Beşiktaş, Istanbul
Saturday, 14:00		Report	(yellow card) 43' Yalçın Tarzan; (red card) 60' Doğan Küçükduru; (yellow card) 77' Hikmet Erön	Attendance: 20.112; Referee: Yılmaz Önen

=== Second half ===
13 February 1977 Round 16	Eskişehirspor	0 – 3	Mersin İdmanyurdu	Atatürk Stadium, Eskişehir
Sunday, 14:15	Burhan İpek (yellow card) 30'	Report	55' Yalçın Tarzan	Referee: Hilmi Ok
Note: Awarded score (Game was suspended by referee Hilmi Ok at 55th minute; Eskişehir received one match stadium ban)

20 February 1977 Round 17	Bursaspor	1 – 0	Mersin İdmanyurdu	Atatürk Stadium, Bursa
Sunday, 14:30	Tacettin Ergürsel 74' (pen.); Tacettin Ergürsel (yellow card) 32'; İhsan Kavak (red card) 80'	Report	(red card) 80' Müjdat Karanfilci	Referee: Ekrem Yenci

27 February 1977 Round 18	Mersin İdmanyurdu	0 – 0	Adana Demirspor	Tevfik Sırrı Gür Stadium, Mersin
Sunday, 13:45		Report		Attendance: Low; Referee: Ertuğrul Dilek

6 March 1977 Round 19	Boluspor	1 – 1	Mersin İdmanyurdu	City Stadium, Bolu
Sunday, 14:45	Alaattin Yolaçan 75'	Report	48' Zeki Temizer; (yellow card) 4' Kemal Damkal; (yellow card) 4' İbrahim Arayıcı	Referee: İhsan Türe

13 March 1977 Round 20	Mersin İdmanyurdu	1 – 1	Orduspor	Tevfik Sırrı Gür Stadium, Mersin
Sunday, 14:45	Müjdat Karanfilci 16'	Report	55' Erdoğan Arıca	Referee: Celal Türk

20 March 1977 Round 21	Trabzonspor	3 – 0	Mersin İdmanyurdu	City Stadium, Trabzon
Sunday, 14:45	Hüseyin Tok 4'; Necmi Perekli 48'; Necmi Perekli 80'	Report		Referee: Hilmi Ok

27 March 1977 Round 22	Mersin İdmanyurdu	3 – 2	Altay	Tevfik Sırrı Gür Stadium, Mersin
Sunday, 14:45	Müjdat Karanfilci 51'; Ayhan Öz 60' (pen.); Yalçın Tarzan 74'	Report	33' Mustafa Denizli; 89' Mustafa Denizli; (red card) 80' Şeref İncirmen	Referee: Doğan Babacan

3 April 1977 Round 23	Giresunspor	1 – 1	Mersin İdmanyurdu	City Stadium, Giresun
Sunday, 14:45	Doğan Tepeçalı 74'	Report	70' Müjdat Karanfilci	Referee: Erdoğan Albay

24 April 1977 Round 24	Mersin İdmanyurdu	0 – 1	Fenerbahçe	Tevfik Sırrı Gür Stadium, Mersin
Sunday, 15:15	İbrahim Arayıcı (yellow card) 75'	Report	52' Cemil Turan; (yellow card) 62' Engin Verel	Referee: Ertuğrul Aybay

1 May 1977 Round 25	Zonguldakspor	1 – 0	Mersin İdmanyurdu	City Stadium, Zonguldak
Sunday, 15:15	Adem Kurukaya 20'	Report		Attendance: 8.500; Referee: Hilmi Ok

8 May 1977 Round 26	Mersin İdmanyurdu	2 – 0	Göztepe	Tevfik Sırrı Gür Stadium, Mersin
Sunday, 15:15	Doğan Küçükduru 11'; İbrahim Arayıcı 55'	Report		Referee: Kemal Akay

15 May 1977 Round 27	Mersin İdmanyurdu	0 – 0	Samsunspor	Tevfik Sırrı Gür Stadium, Mersin
Sunday, 16:00	Doğan Küçükduru (yellow card) 63'	Report	(yellow card) 88' Naim Anuştekin	Referee: Özer Kızıltan

22 May 1977 Round 28	Galatasaray	1 – 1	Mersin İdmanyurdu	İnönü Stadium, Istanbul
Sunday, 18:00	Öner Kılıç 32' (F); Mehmet Oğuz (yellow card) 73'	Report	60' (F) Müjdat Karanfilci; (yellow card) 65' Kemal Damkal	Attendance: 11.527; Referee: Müşfik Talas

29 May 1977 Round 29	Mersin İdmanyurdu	1 – 1	Adanaspor	Tevfik Sırrı Gür Stadium, Mersin
Sunday, 18:00	Müjdat Karanfilci 31'; İbrahim Arayıcı (yellow card) 20'; Mehmet Dayan (yellow card) 39'	Report	27' Vedat Bayraktar; (yellow card) 49' Burhan Çetinkaya	Referee: Doğan Babacan

3 June 1977 Round 30	Mersin İdmanyurdu	2 – 0	Beşiktaş	Tevfik Sırrı Gür Stadium, Mersin
Friday, 18:00	Müjdat Karanfilci 2'; İbrahim Arayıcı 27'	Report		Referee: Yılmaz Dinçel

== 1976–77 Turkish Cup participation ==
1976–77 Turkish Cup was played for the 15th season as Türkiye Kupası by 96 teams. First and second elimination rounds were played in one-leg elimination system. Third and fourth elimination rounds and finals were played in two-legs elimination system. Mersin İdmanyurdu participated in 1976–77 Turkish Cup from round 3 and eliminated at round 4 by Göztepe. Göztepe was eliminated by Beşiktaş at quarterfinals. Trabzonspor won the Cup for the first time. Cup finalist Beşiktaş became eligible for playing 1977–78 ECW Cup, because Trabzonspor also won the league title.

=== Cup track ===
The drawings and results Mersin İdmanyurdu (MİY) followed in 1976–77 Turkish Cup are shown in the following table.

Round	Own League	Opponent's League	Opponent	A	H	Result
Round 3	First League	Second League White Group	Beykoz	2–0	3–2	Promoted to R4
Round 4	First League	First League	Göztepe	0–2 (2–4 p)	2–0	Eliminated

Note: In the above table 'Score' shows For and Against goals whether the match played at home or not.

=== Game details ===
Mersin İdmanyurdu (MİY) 1976–77 Turkish Cup game reports is shown in the following table. Kick off times are in EET and EEST.

1 December 1976 Round 3 Leg 1	Mersin İdmanyurdu	3 – 2	Beykoz	Tevfik Sırrı Gür Stadium, Mersin
Wednesday, 13:15	Zeki Temizer 20'; Doğan Küçükduru 50'; Zeki Temizer 88'	Report	9' Günay Haznedaroğlu; 78' Günay Haznedaroğlu	Referee: Necdet Sinanoğlu

16 December 1976 Round 3 Leg 2	Beykoz	0 – 2	Mersin İdmanyurdu	İnönü Stadium, Istanbul
Thursday, 13:30		Report	52' Kemal Damkal; 73' Zeki Temizer	Referee: Kadri Tümen

30 January 1977 Round 4 Leg 1	Mersin İdmanyurdu	2 – 0	Göztepe	Tevfik Sırrı Gür Stadium, Mersin
Sunday, 13:30	Rüçhan Dağdeviren 4'; Zeki Temizer 33'	Report		Referee: Nihat Özbirgül

6 February 1977 Round 4 Leg 2	Göztepe	2 – 0 (a.e.t.) (4 – 2 p)	Mersin İdmanyurdu	Alsancak Stadium, İzmir
Sunday, 14:30	Yarkın Güvenen 63'; Ali Rıza Kayacı 84' (pen.)	Report		Referee: Cumhur Demir
	Penalties
	Mehmet Türken (penalty scored); Ali Çağlar (penalty scored); Bülent Taşkın (penalty scored); Bora Öztürk (penalty scored)		(penalty scored) Ayhan Öz; (penalty scored) Zeki Temizer

Source: 1976–77 Turkish Cup pages.

== Management ==
=== Club management ===
Burhan Kanun was club president.

=== Coaching team ===
1976–77 Mersin İdmanyurdu head coaches:

Nat	Head coach	Period	Pl	W	D	L	Notes
(Turkey)	Kadri Aytaç	01.08.1976 – 31.05.1977					

Note: Only official games were included.

== 1976–77 squad ==
Stats are counted for 1976–77 First League matches and 1976–77 Turkish Cup (Türkiye Kupası) matches. In the team rosters five substitutes were allowed to appear, two of whom were substitutable. Only the players who appeared in game rosters were included and listed in the order of appearance.

O	N	Nat	Name	Birth	Born	Pos	LA	LG	CA	CG	TA	TG	Booked	Sent off (straight red)	← Season Notes →
1	1	(Turkey)	Atıf Öztoprak	8 May 1952	Sakarya	GK	4		1		5				→ previous season.
2	2	(Turkey)	Mehmet Dayan	1951	Balıkesir	DF	28	1	4		32	1	1		→ previous season.
3	3	(Turkey)	Feridun Alkan			DF	19	1	2		21	1			1976 ST Karabükspor.
4	4	(Turkey)	Tahir Temur	1954	Istanbul	DF	29		4		33				→ previous season.
5	5	(Turkey)	Kemal Damkal	1950	Adana	DF	28		3	1	31	1	2		→ previous season.
6	6	(Turkey)	Şeref Başoğu	1947	Adapazarı	MF	4				4		1		→ previous season.
7	7	(Turkey)	Hikmet Erön	1948	Istanbul	MF	26		2		28		2		→ previous season.
8	8	(Turkey)	Yalçın Tarzan	1948		FW	28	2	4		32	2	1		1976 ST Malatyaspor.
9	9	(Turkey)	İbrahim Arayıcı	1949	Silifke	FW	25	3	2		27	3	5		→ previous season.
10	10	(Turkey)	Zeki Temizer	1945	Istanbul	FW	20	3	4	4	24	7	2		→ previous season.
11	11	(Turkey)	Müjdat Karanfilci	28 Feb 1950	Gelibolu	FW	27	10	3		30	10		1	1976 ST Giresunspor.
12	13	(Turkey)	Rüçhan Dağdeviren	1951	Istanbul	DF	27		4	1	31	1			→ previous season.
13	14	(Turkey)	Ayhan Öz	20 Jul 1945	Mersin	FW	14	2	3		17	2			→ previous season.
14	1	(Turkey)	Aydın Tohumcu	1 Feb 1943	Bilecik	GK	22		3		25				→ previous season.
15	3	(Turkey)	Lütfü Isıgöllü	1943		DF	8		2		10				1976 ST Beşiktaş.
16	10	(Turkey)	Doğan Küçükduru	1949	Istanbul	FW	25	1	4	1	29	2	2	1	→ previous season.
17	9	(Turkey)	Tuğrul Şener	19 May 1952	Yalova	FW	5		3		8				1976 ST Beşiktaş.
18	1	(Turkey)	Erdoğan Demirefe	1947		GK	4				4				1976 ST Samsunspor.
19	13	(Turkey)	İsmail Akdağcık			DF	8				8				→ previous season.
20	8	(Turkey)	Ramazan Göktem			FW	2				2				1976 ST.
21	13	(Turkey)	Nasır Belci	1 Dec 1955	Adana	DF	2				2				First time professional.

Sources: 1976–77 season squad data from maçkolik com, Milliyet, and Cem Pekin Archives.
- Transfers in (Summer 1976): Tuğrul (Beşiktaş), Müjdat (İstanbulspor), Enver (Balıkesirspor). After lose against Adana Demirspor, Lütfü from Beşiktaş, Serdar from Galatasaray and Erdoğan from Fenerbahçe have signed.
- Transfers out: Burhan (Düzcespor); Doğan (Göztepe); Ramazan (İskenderunspor).

== See also ==
- Football in Turkey
