= Adnan Sezgin =

Turkish footballer (born 1954)

Personal information
- Date of birth: 28 January 1954 (age 72)
- Place of birth: Malatya, Turkey
- Position: Defender

Senior career*
Years	Team	Apps	(Gls)
1970–1973	Petrol Ofisi	35	(3)
1974–1979	Ankaragücü	67	(1)
1979–1981	Adana Demirspor	25	(1)
1982–1983	San Jose Earthquakes	1	(0)
- * Club domestic league appearances and goals

Adnan Sezgin (born 28 January 1954) is a Turkish former professional footballer who serves Turkish football in various administrative positions.

== Playing career ==
Born in Malatya, Turkey, Sezgin is a graduate of Ankara University in Political Science. A defender, he started his football career with Petrol Ofisi in the TFF First League. He later played for Ankaragücü and Adana Demirspor in the Süper Lig, before ending his career with San Jose Earthquakes in the United States.

== Administrative career ==
After retiring from football, he founded Professional Footballers Association in Turkey and is the honorary president. He served in Turkish Football Federation as Secretary-General between 1990 and 1992. He was the president of İstanbulspor until 2004.

Sezgin served Galatasaray S.K. between 1992 and 1993 and 1996 and 1997 within Football Committee. Then in 2005, after Özhan Canaydın elected as Galatasaray president for one more term, Sezgin became the general manager of Galatasaray Sportif, the specialized marketing management company, to oversee marketing operations of the Galatasaray brand.

== Personal life ==
Sezgin is fluent in English. He is married and has three children.
