= 1977–78 1.Lig =

20th season of top-tier Turkish football

1.Lig
- Season: 1977–78
- Champions: Fenerbahçe; 9th title
- Relegated: Ankaragücü; Mersin İdman Yurdu
- European Cup: Fenerbahçe
- UEFA Cup: Galatasaray; Adanaspor
- Matches: 240
- Goals: 474 (1.98 per match)
- Top goalscorer: Cemil Turan (17 goals)

Statistics of the Turkish First Football League for the 1977–78 season.

== Overview ==
It was contested by 16 teams, and Fenerbahçe S.K. won the championship. Ankaragücü and Mersin İdman Yurdu relegated to Second League. Turkish Cup winners Trabzonspor could not play in 1978–79 European Cup Winners' Cup because they were suspended.

== League table ==
Pos	Team	Pld	W	D	L	GF	GA	GD	Pts	Qualification or relegation
1	Fenerbahçe (C)	30	17	8	5	48	24	+24	42	Qualification to European Cup first round
2	Trabzonspor	30	18	5	7	42	16	+26	41	
3	Galatasaray	30	13	12	5	38	26	+12	38	Qualification to UEFA Cup first round
4	Adanaspor	30	12	11	7	28	31	−3	35	Qualification to UEFA Cup first round
5	Beşiktaş	30	12	8	10	33	29	+4	32	Invitation to Balkans Cup
6	Altay	30	9	12	9	29	28	+1	30	
7	Boluspor	30	11	8	11	25	26	−1	30	
8	Zonguldakspor	30	11	8	11	33	35	−2	30	
9	Diyarbakırspor	30	10	10	10	29	31	−2	30	
10	Bursaspor	30	9	10	11	26	24	+2	28	
11	Orduspor	30	10	7	13	30	39	−9	27	
12	Eskişehirspor	30	6	13	11	24	28	−4	25	
13	Adana Demirspor	30	7	11	12	24	36	−12	25	
14	Samsunspor	30	8	8	14	26	36	−10	24	
15	MKE Ankaragücü (R)	30	8	6	16	21	31	−10	22	Relegation to Turkish Second Football League
16	Mersin İdman Yurdu (R)	30	3	15	12	18	34	−16	21	Relegation to Turkish Second Football League

Rules for classification: 1) points; 2) goal difference; 3) number of goals scored.
(C) Champions; (R) Relegated

== Results ==
Home \ Away	ADS	ADA	ALT	BJK	BOL	BUR	DYB	ESK	FNB	GAL	MİY	AGÜ	ORD	SAM	TRA	ZON
Adana Demirspor		0–1	1–1	3–0	1–0	1–0	0–0	3–1	1–3	1–0	1–1	1–0	1–1	0–0	0–0	0–0
Adanaspor	1–1		0–0	0–0	2–0	1–0	1–1	1–1	0–3	0–0	1–0	2–0	0–0	4–1	1–0	3–2
Altay	3–2	1–1		0–1	2–1	0–0	1–1	2–1	0–1	2–1	0–0	3–0	2–0	2–1	2–1	3–1
Beşiktaş	1–1	1–0	2–1		2–0	0–0	3–2	2–1	0–1	1–1	4–1	3–0	2–2	2–0	0–2	3–0
Boluspor	1–0	1–2	0–0	1–0		0–0	2–1	0–0	1–0	3–0	1–0	1–0	2–0	1–0	1–2	1–1
Bursaspor	3–0	4–0	2–0	0–0	1–1		3–1	0–0	0–1	1–1	2–1	0–0	3–1	1–0	0–1	2–1
Diyarbakırspor	0–0	0–0	1–0	2–0	1–0	1–0		1–0	2–2	1–1	0–0	2–1	3–1	0–0	2–1	1–0
Eskişehirspor	0–0	0–0	2–1	1–0	1–1	2–0	0–0		1–1	2–2	2–0	0–0	1–1	2–1	0–2	3–0
Fenerbahçe	1–0	1–2	1–1	1–0	1–1	1–0	2–1	2–0		2–2	5–2	2–0	2–0	2–1	0–1	4–0
Galatasaray	4–3	4–0	0–0	3–1	1–0	2–0	3–0	1–0	0–2		2–1	2–0	0–0	2–1	2–1	1–0
Mersin İdman Yurdu	0–1	0–0	0–0	0–0	1–2	1–1	1–2	2–1	2–2	1–1		1–0	1–1	1–0	0–0	0–0
MKE Ankaragücü	3–0	0–1	3–0	0–1	0–0	0–1	1–0	1–1	2–1	3–1	1–1		1–0	0–1	2–1	3–1
Orduspor	2–1	1–0	1–0	0–1	0–3	3–0	3–1	1–0	1–1	0–1	2–1	2–0		2–0	2–0	0–2
Samsunspor	1–0	2–3	0–0	2–1	2–0	1–1	3–2	2–1	3–2	0–0	0–0	0–0	2–1		0–2	1–1
Trabzonspor	4–1	4–0	1–0	3–1	4–0	1–0	1–0	0–0	0–0	0–0	2–0	1–0	3–0	2–0		2–1
Zonguldakspor	4–0	3–1	2–2	1–1	1–0	2–1	1–0	1–0	0–1	0–0	0–0	1–0	5–2	1–0	1–0	

Source: TFF, Mackolik
Legend: Blue = home team win; Yellow = draw; Red = away team win.
