= Fikret Karabudak Stadium =

Association Football Stadium in Turkey

Coordinates: 39°50′09″N 33°30′13″E

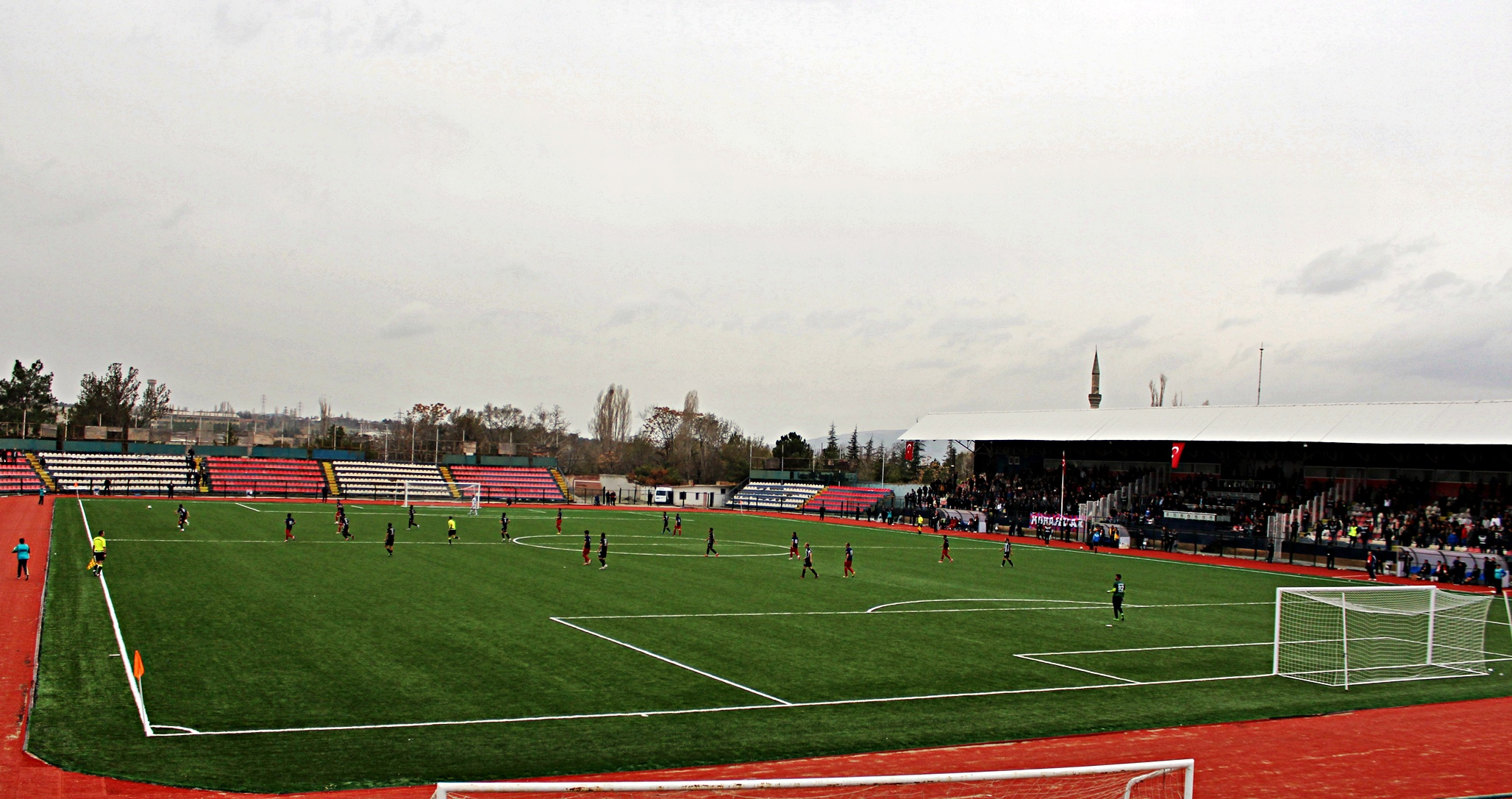
- Interactive map of Fikret Karabudak Stadium
- Location: Kırıkkale, Turkey
- Owner: MKE Kırıkkalespor
- Capacity: 5402
- Surface: Synthetic

Construction
- Opened: 1930s

Fikret Karabudak Stadium, is a football stadium located in the city/town of Kırıkkale in Turkey, Europe. Fikret Karabudak Stadium has a maximum stadium capacity of 5402 spectators. MKE Kırıkkalespor are the main occupants of the stadium. MKE Kırıkkalespor plays their domestic home football fixtures at Fikret Karabudak Stadium.
