= Cebeci İnönü Stadium =

Multi-purpose stadium in Ankara, Turkey

Coordinates: 39.932023°N 32.872146°E

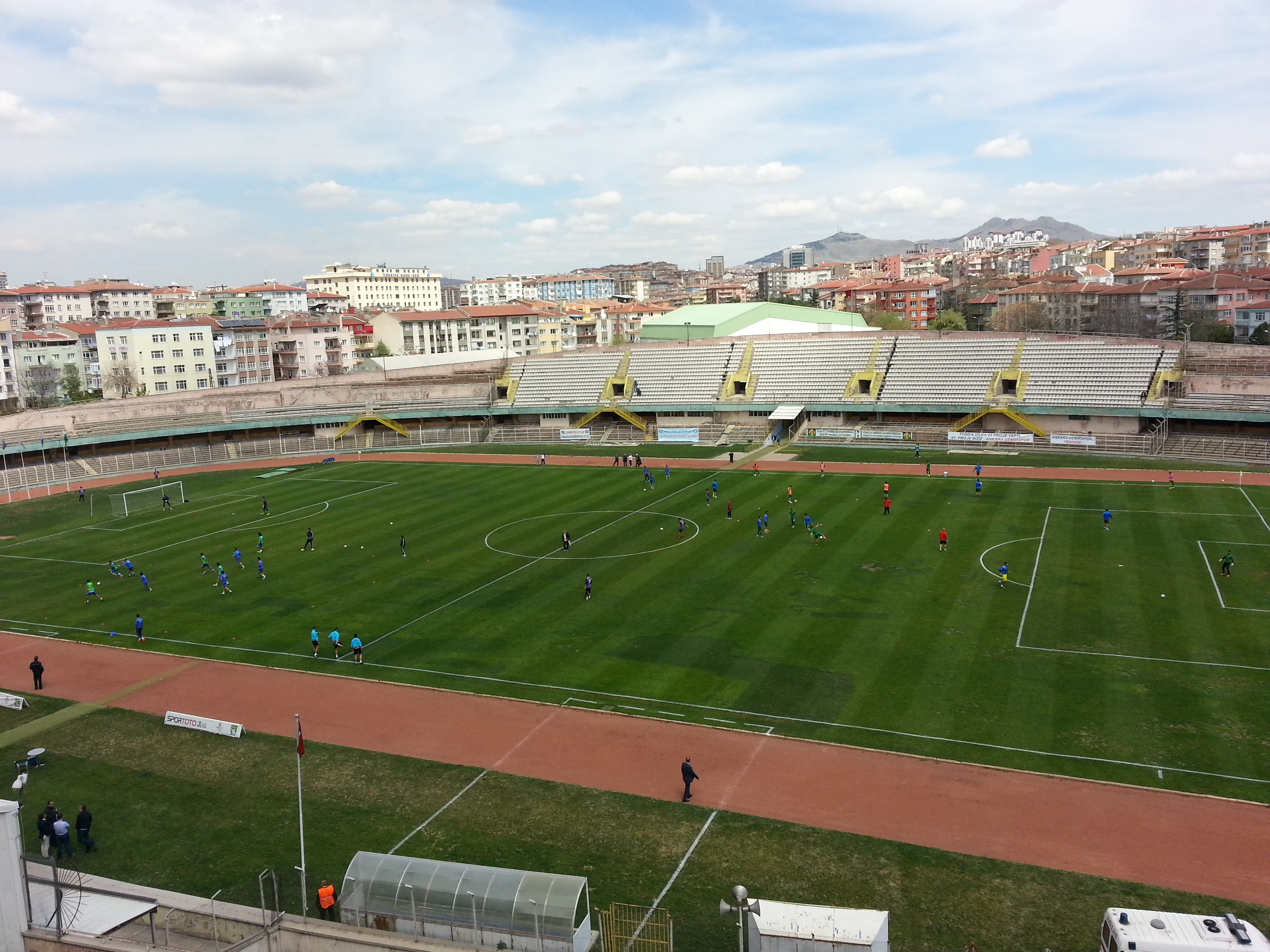
- Interactive map of Cebeci İnönü Stadium
- Location: Ankara, Turkey
- Capacity: 15,000
- Surface: Grass
- Field size: 68 m × 105 m (223 ft × 344 ft)

Construction
- Opened: 1967
- Demolished: 2022

Tenant
- Ankara Demirspor (-2015)

Cebeci İnönü Stadium (Turkish: Cebeci İnönü Stadı) was a multi-purpose stadium in Ankara, Turkey. It was used mostly for football matches and was the home stadium of Hacettepespor. The stadium was built in 1967 and held 15,000 people. It was named after the Turkish statesman İsmet İnönü. It was demolished in 2022.
