= Kurtar =

Kurtar may refer to:

- Kurtar, Iran
- Güvenç Kurtar, Turkish football manager
- İsmail Cem Kurtar, Turkish volleyball player
