= 1971–72 Mersin İdmanyurdu season =

Mersin İdmanyurdu
1971–72 season
- President: Mehmet Karamehmet
- Coach: Turgay Şeren
- Stadium: Mersin, Turkey
- First League: 7th
- Turkish Cup: Did not participate
- Top goalscorer: Güvenç Kurtar (12); Zeki Temizer (8)
Home colours	Away colours	Third colours

Mersin İdmanyurdu (also Mersin İdman Yurdu, Mersin İY, or MİY) Sports Club; located in Mersin, east Mediterranean coast of Turkey in 1971–72. The 1971–72 season was the fifth season of Mersin İdmanyurdu (MİY) football team in Turkish First Football League, the first level division in Turkey. They finished seventh in the league.

Club address was: Bahçelievler, Silifke Caddesi, Mersin. Tel: 1321. Executive committee: Mehmet Karamehmet (president), Ünal Sakman, Emin Yıldız, Orhan Sesimutlu, Erol Tarhan, Güneş Topsal, Çetin Kocaer, Sezai Sak, İbrahim Günay, Aydın Özlü, Özcan Özgürmen, Kayhan Oktar, M. Sözmen, C. Baydur, M. Şahin.

Vice-presidents Erol Tarhan and Mahir Turhan called former coach Turgay Şeren back to club but they could not agree. Mersin İdmanyurdu signed a contract with a foreign manager for the first time in its history, Dumitru Teodorescu. Club executives Orhan Mutlu and Sezai Sak signed former Beşiktaş coach in İstanbul. However, because MİY couldn't obtain a work permit for Teodorescu from Romanian Football Federation, they signed with Turgay Şeren after the second round. Turgay Şeren completed the season.

== Pre-season ==
MİY opened the season on 16.07.1971 with a ceremony in Tevfik Sırrı Gür Stadium.

- 04.08.1971 - MİY-Tarsus İdmanyurdu: 6–0. Tarsus. Ayhan 8', Zeki 42'(P), Halit 60', Ayhan 65', Mustafa 74'(P), Zeki 89'.
- 11.08.1971 - MİY-Adana Demirspor: 2–1. 14:30. Tevfik Sırrı Gür Stadium, Mersin. "Anatolian Cup" game.
- MİY-Adana Demirspor: 1–0.
- 17.08.1971 - Fenerbahçe-MİY: 4–1. Tuesday, 20:00. Mithatpaşa Stadium, İstanbul. Referees: Hilmi Ok, Engil Türkdil, Tuncay Sözer. Fenerbahçe: Datcu, Niyazi, Levent, Ercan (K.Yaşar), serkan, Ostojiç, Fuat, Cevher (Yılmaz), Yaşar, Osman, Şükrü. Goals: Ostojiç 12', Osman 33', Fuat 43', Osman 89'. MİY: Fikret, Halit, Cihat (Güvenir), B.Erol, Akın, Ayhan (Erol), Mustafa, Güray, Ömer (Muhlis), Zeki, Güvenç. Goal: Güvenç 85'. Game played to complete the Zeki-Osman exchange contract.
- 20.08.1971 - Kayserispor-MİY: 2–1.

== 1971–72 First League participation ==
First League was played with 16 teams in its 15th season, 1971–72. Last two teams relegated to Second League 1972–73. Mersin İY became 7th with 10 wins. Before the season, team's most scorer player Osman Arpacıoğlu was transferred to Fenerbahçe; in return Zeki Temizer from Fenerbahçe and Güvenç Kurtar from Beşiktaş were transferred to Mersin İY. In that season most scorer players were Güvenç Kurtar (12 goals) and Zeki Temizer (8 goals).

=== Results summary ===
Mersin İdmanyurdu (MİY) 1971–72 First League summary:

	Overall									Home								Away							
Stage	Pc	Pl	W	D	L	GF	GA	GD	Pt	Pl	W	D	L	GF	GA	GD	Pt	Pl	W	D	L	GF	GA	GD	Pt
First half	4	15	5	8	2	19	14	+5	18	8	4	4	0	15	7	+8	12	7	1	4	2	4	7	-3	6
Second half		15	5	2	8	16	15	+1	12	7	4	2	1	12	3	+9	10	8	1	0	7	4	12	-8	2
Overall	7	30	10	10	10	35	29	+6	30	15	8	6	1	27	10	+17	22	15	2	4	9	8	19	-11	8

Sources: 1971–72 Turkish First Football League pages.

=== League table ===
Mersin İY's league performance in First League in 1971–72 season is shown in the following table.

Pos	Team	Pld	W	D	L	GF	GA	GD	Pts	Qualification or relegation
5	MKE Ankaragücü	30	10	13	7	22	22	0	33	Qualification to Cup Winners' Cup first round
6	Bursaspor	30	12	8	10	29	24	+5	32	
7	Mersin İdmanyurdu	30	10	10	10	35	29	+6	30	
8	Adanaspor	30	9	12	9	28	26	+2	30	
9	Göztepe	30	10	9	11	32	32	0	29	

Rules for classification: 1) points; 2) goal difference; 3) number of goals scored.

Note: Won, drawn and lost points are 2, 1 and 0. F belongs to MİY and A belongs to corresponding team for both home and away matches.

=== Results by round ===
Results of games MİY played in 1971–72 First League by rounds:

Round	1	2	3	4	5	6	7	8	9	10	11	12	13	14	15	16	17	18	19	20	21	22	23	24	25	26	27	28	29	30
Ground	A	H	A	H	H	A	H	H	A	A	H	A	H	H	A	H	A	H	A	A	H	A	A	H	H	A	H	A	A	H
Result	D	W	L	W	W	D	W	D	W	D	D	L	D	W	D	L	L	W	L	L	W	L	W	D	D	L	W	L	L	W
Position	8	7	12	9	4	5	3	3	2	1	2	5	5	4	4	7	7	7	7	8	6	7	6	6	6	6	6	7	9	7

Source: 1971–72 Turkish First Football League pages.
A = Away; H = Home; W = Win; D = Draw; L = Loss

=== First half ===
21 August 1971 Round 1	Vefa	1 – 1	Mersin İdmanyurdu	Mithatpaşa Stadium, Istanbul
Saturday, 20:00	Abdülmetin Kocaoğlu 83'	Report	20' Güvenç Kurtar	Referee: Yavuz Tunç

29 August 1971 Round 2	Mersin İdmanyurdu	2 – 2	Adanaspor	Tevfik Sırrı Gür Stadium, Mersin
Sunday, 16:00	Zeki Temizer 41'; Zeki Temizer 58'	Report	50' Ali Osman Renklibay; 64' (pen.) Ali Osman Renklibay	Referee: Doğan Babacan

5 September 1971 Round 3	Giresunspor	2 – 1	Mersin İdmanyurdu	City Stadium, Giresun
Sunday, 16:00	Doğan Tepeçalı 47'; Ruhi Yazıcıoğlu 49'	Report	50' Güvenç Kurtar	Referee: Macit Sarıdana

10 October 1971 Round 4	Mersin İdmanyurdu	3 – 0	Eskişehirspor	Tevfik Sırrı Gür Stadium, Mersin
Sunday, 15:00	Mustafa Yürür 12' (pen.); Ayhan Öz 69'; İbrahim Arayıcı 75'	Report		Referee: Ziya Türkdoğan

3 October 1971 Round 5	Mersin İdmanyurdu	4 – 3	Bursaspor	Tevfik Sırrı Gür Stadium, Mersin
Sunday, 15:15	Güray Erdener 5'; Güvenç Kurtar 6'; Zeki temizer 48'; Ömer Tokgöz 55'	Report	26' Hamdi Şensoy; 50' Hamdi Şensoy; 87' (pen.) Mesut Şen	Referee: Nejat Şener

24 October 1971 Round 6	Ankaragücü	0 – 0	Mersin İdmanyurdu	19 Mayıs Stadium, Ankara
Sunday, 15:00	Köksal Mesçi (penalty missed) 76'	Report		Referee: Hilmi Ok

31 October 1971 Round 7	Mersin İdmanyurdu	2 – 0	İstanbulspor	Tevfik Sırrı Gür Stadium, Mersin
Sunday, 14:30	Zeki Temizer 18'; Güvenç Kurtar 31'	Report		Referee: Mazhar Kerestecioğlu

7 November 1971 Round 8	Mersin İdmanyurdu	0 – 0	Samsunspor	Tevfik Sırrı Gür Stadium, Mersin
Sunday, 14:00		Report		Referee: Veli Necdet Arığ

21 November 1971 Round 9	Boluspor	0 – 1	Mersin İdmanyurdu	City Stadium, Bolu
Sunday, 14:45		Report	43' Güray Erdener	Referee: İhsan Türe

28 November 1971 Round 10	Fenerbahçe	1 – 1	Mersin İdmanyurdu	Mithatpaşa Stadium, Istanbul
Sunday, 14:30	Levent Engineri 22'	Report	70' Zeki Temizer	Referee: Yavuz Tunç

12 December 1971 Round 11	Mersin İdmanyurdu	1 – 1	Göztepe	Tevfik Sırrı Gür Stadium, Mersin
Sunday, 14:00	Mustafa Yürür 57' (pen.)	Report	25' Fevzi Zemzem	Referee: Mazhar Kerestecioğlu

19 December 1971 Round 12	Altay	3 – 0	Mersin İdmanyurdu	Atatürk Stadium, İzmir
Sunday, 14:30	Mustafa Kaplakaslan 44' (F); Mustafa Denizli 55'; Ayfer Elmastaşoğlu 72'	Report	(red card) 38' Mustafa Yürür	Referee: Ahmet Bagatır

26 December 1971 Round 13	Mersin İdmanyurdu	1 – 1	Galatasaray	Tevfik Sırrı Gür Stadium, Mersin
Sunday, 13:45	Ayhan Öz 58'	Report	42' Uğur Köken	Referee: Ziya Türkdoğan

2 January 1972 Round 14	Mersin İdmanyurdu	2 – 0	Karşıyaka	Tevfik Sırrı Gür Stadium, Mersin
Sunday, 13:45	Güvenç Kurtar 23'; Güray Erdener 49'	Report		Referee: Ertuğrul Aybay

9 January 1972 Round 15	Beşiktaş	0 – 0	Mersin İdmanyurdu	Mithatpaşa Stadium, Istanbul
Sunday, 16:30		Report		Referee: Fehmi Pazarcı

=== Second half ===
20 February 1972 Round 16	Mersin İdmanyurdu	0 – 1	Vefa	Tevfik Sırrı Gür Stadium, Mersin
Sunday, 14:30	İbrahim Arayıcı (red card) 48'	Report	79' Jorge Montemarani; (yellow card) Faruk Özceylan	Attendance: 5.625; Referee: Macit Sarıdana

27 February 1972 Round 17	Adanaspor	1 – 0	Mersin İdmanyurdu	City Stadium, Adana
Sunday, 14:30	Necip Erdoğan 87'	Report	(yellow card) Zeki Temizer	Attendance: 9.600; Referee: Ömer Karadağ

5 March 1972 Round 18	Mersin İdmanyurdu	3 – 0	Giresunspor	Tevfik Sırrı Gür Stadium, Mersin
Sunday, 14:45	Güvenç Kurtar 53'; Ayhan Öz 68'; Güvenç Kurtar 75'; Ömer Tokgöz (yellow card) 25'; Akın Aksaçlı (yellow card) 38'	Report	(yellow card) 17' Rüçhan Dağdeviren	Attendance: 10.000; Referee: Cevdet Güvenli

12 March 1972 Round 19	Eskişehirspor	2 – 0	Mersin İdmanyurdu	Atatürk Stadium, Eskişehir
Sunday, 15:30	Burhan Tözer 33'; Şevki Şenlen 53'; Fethi Heper (yellow card)	Report	(yellow card) Mustafa Yürür; (yellow card) 85' (red card) Cihat Erbil	Attendance: 3.565; Referee: Muzaffer Sarvan

19 March 1972 Round 20	Bursaspor	1 – 0	Mersin İdmanyurdu	Atatürk Stadium, Bursa
Sunday, 16:00	Ersel Altıparmak 76'; Haluk Erdemoğlu (yellow card) 64'	Report	(yellow card) 64' Güvenç Kurtar	Attendance: 16.888; Referee: Erkan Göksel

26 March 1972 Round 21	Mersin İdmanyurdu	1 – 0	Ankaragücü	Tevfik Sırrı Gür Stadium, Mersin
Sunday, 15:00	Remzi Sezer 47'; Akın Aksaçlı (yellow card); Halit Kutlu (yellow card); Erol Evcimen (red card) 71'	Report		Attendance: 5.700; Referee: Ömer Karadağ

1 April 1972 Round 22	İstanbulspor	1 – 0	Mersin İdmanyurdu	Mithatpaşa Stadium, Istanbul
Saturday, 16:00	Cemil Turan 60'	Report		Referee: Veli Necdet Arığ

9 April 1972 Round 23	Samsunspor	1 – 0	Mersin İdmanyurdu	City Stadium, Samsun
Sunday, 15:00	Sami Tali (penalty missed) 48'; Ali Elveren (red card) 44'	Report	35' Güvenç Kurtar	Attendance: 16.550; Referee: Sabahattin Ladikli

16 April 1972 Round 24	Mersin İdmanyurdu	1 – 1	Boluspor	Tevfik Sırrı Gür Stadium, Mersin
Sunday, 15:00	Zeki Temizer 49'	Report	53' Çetin Erdoğan	Attendance: 5.000; Referee: Nihat Özbirgül

23 April 1972 Round 25	Mersin İdmanyurdu	1 – 1	Fenerbahçe	Tevfik Sırrı Gür Stadium, Mersin
Sunday, 15:15	Cihat Erbil 37'; Zeki Temizer (red card) 90'	Report	58' Serkan Acar; (red card) 90' Levent Engineri	Referee: Ertuğrul Aybay

30 April 1972 Round 26	Göztepe	4 – 2	Mersin İdmanyurdu	Alsancak stadium, İzmir
Sunday, 16:00	Nevzat Güzelırmak 29'; Mehmet Türken 34'; Fevzi Zemzem 48' (pen.); Fevzi Zemzem 61'	Report	36' Güvenç Kurtar; 54' Remzi Sezer	Referee: Özcan Gürkaynak

7 May 1972 Round 27	Mersin İdmanyurdu	3 – 0	Altay	Tevfik Sırrı Gür Stadium, Mersin
Sunday, 15:30	Güvenç Kurtar 8'; Güvenç Kurtar 44'; Güvenç Kurtar 69'; Akın Aksaçlı (yellow card) 42'	Report		Attendance: 5.000; Referee: Nevzat Tansuk

14 May 1972 Round 28	Galatasaray	1 – 0	Mersin İdmanyurdu	Ali Sami Yen Stadium, Istanbul
Sunday, 16:00	Metin Kurt 83' (H); Aydın Güleş (yellow card) 60'	Report	(yellow card) 41' Zeki Temizer; (yellow card) 52' Akın Aksaçlı	Attendance: 20.173; Referee: İbrahim Fırla

21 May 1972 Round 29	Karşıyaka	2 – 1	Mersin İdmanyurdu	Alsancak stadium, İzmir
Sunday, 16:00	Ender İçten 59'; Burhan Gürel 64'	Report	15' Zeki Temizer	Referee: Kamil Karakoç

28 May 1972 Round 30	Mersin İdmanyurdu	3 – 0	Beşiktaş	Tevfik Sırrı Gür Stadium, Mersin
Sunday, 15:30	Alp Sümeralp 2'; Zeki Temizer 49'; Mustafa Yürür 81' (pen.); Cihat Erbil (yellow card)	Report	(yellow card) İhsan Özbek	Attendance: 5.800; Referee: İhsan Türe

== 1971–72 Turkish Cup participation ==
1971–72 Turkish Cup was played for the 10th season as Türkiye Kupası by 26 teams. Two elimination rounds and finals were played in two-legs elimination system. Top ten first division teams from previous season participated. Mersin İdmanyurdu did not participate in the Cup because they had finished previous season at 11th place. MKE Ankaragücü won the Cup for the first time.

== Management ==
=== Club management ===
Mehmet Karamehmet was club president.

=== Coaching team ===
1971–72 Mersin İdmanyurdu head coaches:

Nat	Head coach	Period	Pl	W	D	L	Notes
(Turkey)		01.08.1971 – 31.05.1972					
(Turkey)	Turgay Şeren	01.08.1971 – 31.05.1972					

Note: Only official games were included.

== 1971–72 squad ==
Stats are counted for 1971–72 First League matches. In the team rosters five substitutes were allowed to appear, two of whom were substitutable. Only the players who appeared in game rosters were included and listed in the order of appearance.

O	N	Nat	Name	Birth	Born	Pos	LA	LG	CA	CG	TA	TG	Booked	Sent off (straight red)	← Season Notes →
1	1	(Turkey)	Fikret Özdil	1943		GK	17				17				→ previous season.
2	2	(Turkey)	Güvenir Kurtar	1947	Turhal	DF	12				12				1971 ST Trabzonspor.
3	3	(Turkey)	Akın Aksaçlı	1947		DF	28				28				→ previous season.
4	4	(Turkey)	Erol Evcimen	1944		DF	14				14				→ previous season.
5	5	(Turkey)	Refik Çoğum	1940		MF	28				28				→ previous season.
6	6	(Turkey)	Mustafa Yürür (C)	26 Jun 1938	Istanbul	MF	27	3			27	3			→ previous season.
7	7	(Turkey)	Ömer Tokgöz	1947		FW	29	1			29	1			1971 ST Ankaragücü.
8	8	(Turkey)	Ayhan Öz	20 Jul 1945	Mersin	FW	24	3			24	3			→ previous season.
9	9	(Turkey)	Güray Erdener	12 Jan 1944	Çanakkale	FW	26	3			26	3			1971 ST Beşiktaş.
10	10	(Turkey)	Zeki Temizer	1945	Istanbul	FW	28	8			28	8		1	1971 ST Fenerbahçe.
11	11	(Turkey)	Güvenç Kurtar	25 Jul 1950	Uşak	FW	24	12			24	12			1971 ST Beşiktaş.
12	13	(Turkey)	Erol Durmuşlu	1 Nov 1950	Silifke	FW	7				7				→ previous season.
13	14	(Turkey)	Turgay			FW	1				1				1971 ST Aksarayspor.
14	2	(Turkey)	Cihat Erbil	1946	Alpullu	DF	21	1			21	1			→ previous season.
15	5	(Turkey)	Halit Kutlu			MF	16				16				1971 ST Beşiktaş.
16	13	(Turkey)	Muhittin			FW	1				1				
17	10	(Turkey)	Alp Sümeralp	1938	Istanbul	FW	12	1			12	1			→ previous season.
18	13	(Turkey)	İbrahim Arayıcı	1949	Silifke	FW	9	1			9	1		1	→ previous season.
19	4	(Turkey)	Remzi Sezer			MF	8	2			8	2			
20	1	(Socialist Federal Republic of Yugoslavia)	Branislav Veljković	1944		GK	15				15				1971 SL Adanaspor.
21	13	(Turkey)	Mehmet Şilan	17 Dec 1955	Mersin	FW	1				1				First time professional.

Sources: 1971–72 season squad data from maçkolik com, Milliyet, and Erbil (1975).

News from Milliyet:

- After the season Cihat Erbil (28) has cancered. The club has started a fund drive for the player.
- Transfers in: Zeki has come from Fenerbahçe in exchange for Osman. Güray, Güvenç and Halit were transferred from Beşiktaş; and Ömer from Ankaragücü. Velkoviç loaned from Adanaspor. Güvenir from Trabzonspor. Selahattin and İbrahim from İçelspor. Turgay and Erol from Aksarayspor. Mehmet from Tayfun.
- Transfers out: Mustafa Yürür (Kasımpaşa). Necmi (Vefa). Ekrem (Hatayspor).

== See also ==
- Football in Turkey
