= 1972–73 Mersin İdmanyurdu season =

Mersin İdmanyurdu
1972–73 season
- President: Mehmet Karamehmet
- Coach: Nazım Koka
- Stadium: Mersin, Turkey
- First League: 11th
- Turkish Cup: Eliminated at R2
- Top goalscorer: Zeki Temizer (8)
| Home colours | Away colours | Third colours |

Mersin İdmanyurdu (also Mersin İdman Yurdu, Mersin İY, or MİY) Sports Club; located in Mersin, east Mediterranean coast of Turkey in 1972–73. The 1972–73 season was the sixth season of Mersin İdmanyurdu (MİY) football team in Turkish First Football League, the first level division in Turkey. They finished 11th in the league.

President was Mehmet Karamehmet. Vice president was Sezai Sak. General captain was Necati Bolkan. Governor of Mersin Bayram Turançetin gave a speech before the game played on 25 December 1972, against MKE Ankaragücü, inviting fans to support the team. Coach was Turgay Şeren. Şeren completed first half and resigned after a home lost against Eskişehirspor on 17th round. Nazım Koka replaced him.

In Turkish Cup the team was eliminated to Gaziantepspor at 2nd round.

== Pre-season ==
- 20.08.1972 - Kayserispor-MİY: 2–1.

== 1972–73 First League participation ==
First League was played with 16 teams in its 16th season, 1972–73. Last two teams relegated to Second League 1973–74. Mersin İY became 11th with 8 wins. Zeki Temizer was the most scorer player with 8 goals.

- Friendly game: 21.10.1972 - MİY-Guarani (BRA): 3–2. Saturday, 14:30. Tevfik Sırrı Gür Stadium, Mersin.

=== Results summary ===
Mersin İdmanyurdu (MİY) 1972–73 First League summary:

| | Overall | | | | | | | | | Home | | | | | | | | Away | | | | | | | |
| Stage | Pc | Pl | W | D | L | GF | GA | GD | Pt | Pl | W | D | L | GF | GA | GD | Pt | Pl | W | D | L | GF | GA | GD | Pt |
|---|---|---|---|---|---|---|---|---|---|---|---|---|---|---|---|---|---|---|---|---|---|---|---|---|---|
| First half | 11 | 15 | 3 | 7 | 5 | 12 | 13 | -1 | 13 | 8 | 3 | 4 | 1 | 7 | 3 | +4 | 10 | 7 | 0 | 3 | 4 | 5 | 10 | -5 | 3 |
| Second half | | 15 | 5 | 4 | 6 | 14 | 18 | -4 | 14 | 7 | 3 | 3 | 1 | 9 | 6 | +3 | 9 | 8 | 2 | 1 | 5 | 5 | 12 | -7 | 5 |
| Overall | 11 | 30 | 8 | 11 | 11 | 26 | 31 | -5 | 27 | 15 | 6 | 7 | 2 | 16 | 9 | +7 | 19 | 15 | 2 | 4 | 9 | 10 | 22 | -12 | 8 |

Sources: 1972–73 Turkish First Football League pages.

=== League table ===
Mersin İY's league performance in First League in 1972–73 season is shown in the following table.

| Pos | Team | Pld | W | D | L | GF | GA | GD | Pts |
|---|---|---|---|---|---|---|---|---|---|
| 9 | Giresunspor | 30 | 11 | 7 | 12 | 27 | 34 | −7 | 29 |
| 10 | Bursaspor | 30 | 6 | 16 | 8 | 27 | 29 | −2 | 28 |
| 11 | Mersin İdmanyurdu | 30 | 8 | 11 | 11 | 26 | 31 | −5 | 27 |
| 12 | Samsunspor | 30 | 8 | 10 | 12 | 21 | 40 | −19 | 26 |
| 13 | Adanaspor | 30 | 7 | 9 | 14 | 24 | 34 | −10 | 23 |

Rules for classification: 1) points; 2) goal difference; 3) number of goals scored.

Note: Won, drawn and lost points are 2, 1 and 0. F belongs to MİY and A belongs to corresponding team for both home and away matches.

=== Results by round ===
Results of games MİY played in 1972–73 First League by rounds:

| Round | 1 | 2 | 3 | 4 | 5 | 6 | 7 | 8 | 9 | 10 | 11 | 12 | 13 | 14 | 15 | 16 | 17 | 18 | 19 | 20 | 21 | 22 | 23 | 24 | 25 | 26 | 27 | 28 | 29 | 30 |
|---|---|---|---|---|---|---|---|---|---|---|---|---|---|---|---|---|---|---|---|---|---|---|---|---|---|---|---|---|---|---|
| Ground | H | A | A | H | A | H | H | A | H | H | A | H | A | H | A | A | H | H | A | H | A | A | H | A | A | H | A | H | A | H |
| Result | W | L | L | W | D | D | D | D | W | L | D | D | L | D | L | L | L | D | L | W | W | L | D | W | L | W | L | W | D | D |
| Position | 8 | 10 | 13 | 6 | 7 | 10 | 11 | 8 | 6 | 8 | 9 | 10 | 11 | 11 | 11 | 12 | 12 | 12 | 13 | 12 | 10 | 12 | 12 | 12 | 12 | 12 | 12 | 11 | 11 | 11 |

Source: 1972–73 Turkish First Football League pages.
A = Away; H = Home; W = Win; D = Draw; L = Loss

=== First half ===
| 10 September 1972 Round 1 | Mersin İdmanyurdu | 1 – 0 | Vefa | Tevfik Sırrı Gür Stadium, Mersin |
| Sunday, 16:00 | Akın Aksaçlı 81' | Report | (yellow card) 42' Bekir Psav | Attendance: 6.000; Referee: Nihat Özbirgül |

| 17 September 1972 Round 2 | Eskişehirspor | 1 – 0 | Mersin İdmanyurdu | Atatürk Stadium, Eskişehir |
| Sunday, 15:45 | Burhan Tözer 68' (pen.); Fethi Heper (yellow card) 23'; Vahap Özbayer (yellow card) 33' | Report | | Referee: Kemal Akay |

| 24 September 1972 Round 3 | Galatasaray | 2 – 0 | Mersin İdmanyurdu | Ali Sami Yen Stadium, Istanbul |
| Sunday, 15:45 | Mehmet Özgül 18'; Metin Kurt 42'; Bülent Ünder (yellow card); Gökmen Özdenak (yellow card) | Report | (yellow card) Refik Çoğum | Attendance: 28.306; Referee: Muzaffer Sarvan |

| 1 October 1972 Round 4 | Mersin İdmanyurdu | 3 – 1 | Samsunspor | Tevfik Sırrı Gür Stadium, Mersin |
| Sunday, 15:00 | Güray Erdener 16'; Alp Sümeralp 69'; Alp Sümeralp 80' | Report | 7' Raşit Dağdeviren | Referee: Fehmi Pazarcı |

| 8 October 1972 Round 5 | Giresunspor | 1 – 1 | Mersin İdmanyurdu | City Stadium, Giresun |
| Sunday, 15:00 | Doğan Tepeçalı 15' | Report | 19' Zeki Temizer; (yellow card) Necdet Aykut | Referee: Sabahattin Ladikli |

| 15 October 1972 Round 6 | Mersin İdmanyurdu | 0 – 0 | Bursaspor | Tevfik Sırrı Gür Stadium, Mersin |
| Sunday, 14:45 | Yılmaz Urul (yellow card); Akın Aksaçlı (yellow card); Zeki Temizer (yellow card) | Report | (yellow card) Mesut Şen; (yellow card) Yusuf Çavdar | Attendance: 8.794; Referee: Talat Tokat |

| 29 October 1972 Round 7 | Mersin İdmanyurdu | 0 – 0 | Fenerbahçe | Tevfik Sırrı Gür Stadium, Mersin |
| Sunday, 14:30 | Cihat Erbil (yellow card) | Report | (yellow card) Fuat Saner | Attendance: 14.769; Referee: Fehmi Pazarcı |

| 5 November 1972 Round 8 | Boluspor | 3 – 3 | Mersin İdmanyurdu | City Stadium, Bolu |
| Sunday, 15:00 | Ahmet Yılmaz 67' (pen.); Lütfü Isıgöllü 83' | Report | 1' Necdet Aykut; 22' Necdet Aykut; 74' Zeki Temizer; 80' (o.g.) Alp Sümeralp; (yellow card) Necdet Aykut | Attendance: 4.890; Referee: Mazhar Kerestecioğlu |

| 12 November 1972 Round 9 | Mersin İdmanyurdu | 2 – 0 | Göztepe | Tevfik Sırrı Gür Stadium, Mersin |
| Sunday, 14:15 | Necdet Aykut 54'; Zeki Temizer 67'; Güray Erdener (penalty missed) 55'; Ömer Tokgöz (yellow card) 25' | Report | (yellow card) 25' Doğan Küçükduru | Attendance: 11.300; Referee: Sedat Özselçuk |

| 19 November 1972 Round 10 | Mersin İdmanyurdu | 0 – 1 | Adanaspor | Tevfik Sırrı Gür Stadium, Mersin |
| Sunday, 14:00 | | Report | 17' Đorđe Milić; (yellow card) 4' Tufan Akdemir | Referee: Sabahattin Ladikli |

| 25 November 1972 Round 11 | Şekerspor | 0 – 0 | Mersin İdmanyurdu | 19 Mayıs Stadium, Ankara |
| Saturday, 14:30 | | Report | | Referee: Ömer Karadağ |

| 3 December 1972 Round 12 | Mersin İdmanyurdu | 1 – 1 | PTT | Tevfik Sırrı Gür Stadium, Mersin |
| Sunday, 13:30 | Necdet Aykut 41' | Report | 77' Cevdet Özköksal | Referee: Yavuz Tunç |

| 16 December 1972 Round 13 | Beşiktaş | 1 – 0 | Mersin İdmanyurdu | Mithatpaşa Stadium, Istanbul |
| Saturday, 14:15 | Sanlı Sarıalioğlu 22' | Report | (yellow card) Ömer Tokgöz; (yellow card) Davut Şahin; (yellow card) Ayhan Öz | Attendance: 11.648; Referee: Ertuğrul Aybay |

| 24 December 1972 Round 14 | Mersin İdmanyurdu | 0 – 0 | Ankaragücü | Tevfik Sırrı Gür Stadium, Mersin |
| Sunday, 13:30 | | Report | | Referee: Doğan Babacan |

| 31 December 1972 Round 15 | Altay | 2 – 1 | Mersin İdmanyurdu | Alsancak Stadium, İzmir |
| Sunday, 14:15 | Necdet Tunca 24'; İsa Ertürk 26'; İsmail Zeyrek (yellow card) 43' | Report | 1' Zeki Temizer; (yellow card) 28' Zeki Temizer | Attendance: Very low Referee: Kamil Karakoç |

=== Second half ===
| 3 February 1973 Round 16 | Vefa | 1 – 0 | Mersin İdmanyurdu | Mithatpaşa Stadium, Istanbul |
| Saturday, 14:30 | Ömer Güvenç 37'; Jorge Montemarani (red card) 38'; Bekir Psav (yellow card) 39' | Report | (red card) 38' Ayhan Öz; (yellow card) 39' Halit Kutlu | Attendance: 4.766; Referee: Muzaffer Sarvan |

| 11 February 1973 Round 17 | Mersin İdmanyurdu | 1 – 2 | Eskişehirspor | Tevfik Sırrı Gür Stadium, Mersin |
| Sunday, 14:00 | Alp Sümeralp 87'; Zeki Temizer (yellow card); Halit Kutlu (yellow card) | Report | 6' Halil Güngördü; 12' Şevki Şenlen; (yellow card) Halil Güngördü; (yellow card) Şevki Şenlen; (yellow card) Abdurrahman Temel | Referee: Sabahattin Ladikli |

| 18 February 1973 Round 18 | Mersin İdmanyurdu | 0 – 0 | Galatasaray | Tevfik Sırrı Gür Stadium, Mersin |
| Sunday, 14:00 | | Report | (yellow card) 30' Muzaffer Sipahi | Referee: Ziya Türkdoğan |

| 4 March 1973 Round 19 | Samsunspor | 1 – 0 | Mersin İdmanyurdu | City Stadium, Samsun |
| Sunday, 14:00 | Temel Keskindemir 84' | Report | | Referee: Nevzat Tansuk |

| 11 March 1973 Round 20 | Mersin İdmanyurdu | 1 – 0 | Giresunspor | Tevfik Sırrı Gür Stadium, Mersin |
| Sunday, 14:00 | Zeki Temizer 48' | Report | (yellow card) Nurettin Çavuşoğlu; (yellow card) Doğan Tepeçalı | Referee: Yavuz Tunç |

| 18 March 1973 Round 21 | Bursaspor | 1 – 2 | Mersin İdmanyurdu | Atatürk Stadium, Bursa |
| Sunday, 15:00 | Tezcan Ozan 77' | Report | 42' İbrahim Arayıcı; 69' Güray Erdener | Referee: Nihat Özbirgül |

| 25 March 1973 Round 22 | Fenerbahçe | 3 – 0 | Mersin İdmanyurdu | Mithatpaşa Stadium, Istanbul |
| Sunday, 14:45 | Nedim Doğan 11'; Cemil Turan 23'; Stevan Ostojić 70' | Report | (yellow card) 32' Güray Erdener | Attendance: 40.535; Referee: İbrahim Fırla |

| 1 April 1973 Round 23 | Mersin İdmanyurdu | 0 – 0 | Boluspor | Tevfik Sırrı Gür Stadium, Mersin |
| Sunday, 14:45 | | Report | | Referee: Fehmi Pazarcı |

| 8 April 1973 Round 24 | Göztepe | 0 – 1 | Mersin İdmanyurdu | Alsancak Stadium, İzmir |
| Sunday, 15:30 | Nevzat Güzelırmak (yellow card) 27'; Halit Kutlu (yellow card) 32' | Report | 55' Burhan Çetinkaya | Attendance: Low; Referee: Cumhur Demir |

| 15 April 1973 Round 25 | Adanaspor | 3 – 0 | Mersin İdmanyurdu | City Stadium, Adana |
| Sunday, 15:00 | Reşit Kaynak 3'; Reşit Kaynak 36'; Đorđe Milić 90'; Naci Tulun (yellow card) | Report | (penalty missed) 85' Güray Erdener; (yellow card) Cihat Erbil; (yellow card) Akın Aksaçlı | Attendance: Low; Referee: Sedat Özselçuk |

| 22 April 1973 Round 26 | Mersin İdmanyurdu | 4 – 2 | Şekerspor | Tevfik Sırrı Gür Stadium, Mersin |
| Sunday, 15:00 | Zeki Temizer 36' (H); Burhan Çetinkaya 47' (F); Zeki Temizer 65' (F); Zeki Temizer 79' (F) | Report | 76' (F) Mücahit Kırkhanlar; 80' (F) Güngör Sürel; (yellow card) 25' Yiğit Deriner | Referee: İlhan Özkan |

| 29 April 1973 Round 27 | PTT | 2 – 1 | Mersin İdmanyurdu | 19 Mayıs Stadium, Ankara |
| Sunday, 15:15 | Enver Ürekli 6'; Halil Tuğray 41' | Report | 82' Güray Erdener | Attendance: 3.500; Referee: Fehmi Pazarcı |

| 12 May 1973 Round 28 | Mersin İdmanyurdu | 1 – 0 | Beşiktaş | Tevfik Sırrı Gür Stadium, Mersin |
| Saturday, 15:30 | AyhanÖz 83'; İbrahim Arayıcı (yellow card) 18' | Report | (yellow card) 19' Sanlı Sarıalioğlu | Referee: Müşfik Talas |

| 20 May 1973 Round 29 | Ankaragücü | 1 – 1 | Mersin İdmanyurdu | 19 Mayıs Stadium, Ankara |
| Sunday, 17:45 | Behzat Çınar 12'; Mehmet Aktan (red card) 71' | Report | 41' Ömer Tokgöz; (red card) 67' Halit Kutlu | Referee: Doğan Babacan |

| 27 May 1973 Round 30 | Mersin İdmanyurdu | 2 – 2 | Altay | Tevfik Sırrı Gür Stadium, Mersin |
| Sunday, 15:30 | Güray Erdener 9'; İbrahim Arayıcı 78' | Report | 26' Mustafa Denizli; 83' Uğur İpekkan | Referee: Nevzat Tansuk |

== 1972–73 Turkish Cup participation ==
1972–73 Turkish Cup was played for the 11th season as Türkiye Kupası by 26 teams. Two elimination rounds and finals were played in two-legs elimination system. Mersin İdmanyurdu participated in 1972–73 Turkish Cup from the first round and was eliminated at second round by Gaziantepspor. Gaziantepspor was eliminated at quarter-finals. Galatasaray won the Cup for the 5th time.

=== Cup track ===
The drawings and results Mersin İdmanyurdu (MİY) followed in 1972–73 Turkish Cup are shown in the following table.

| Round | Own League | Opponent's League | Opponent | A | H | Result |
|---|---|---|---|---|---|---|
| Round 1 | First League | Amateur | Eskişehir Havagücü | 1–1 | 1–0 | Promoted to R2 |
| Round 2 | First League | Second League Red Group | Gaziantepspor | 0–2 | 0–0 | Eliminated |

Note: In the above table 'Score' shows For and Against goals whether the match played at home or not.

=== Game details ===
Mersin İdmanyurdu (MİY) 1972–73 Turkish Cup game reports is shown in the following table. Kick off times are in EET and EEST.

| 1 November 1972 Round 1 Leg 1 | Eskişehir Havagücü | 1 – 1 | Mersin İdmanyurdu | atatürk Stadium, Eskişehir |
| Wednesday, 14:30 | Erol 17' | Report | 2' (pen.) Ahyan Öz | Referee: Teoman Parer |

| 15 November 1972 Round 1 Leg 2 | Mersin İdmanyurdu | 1 – 0 | Eskişehir Havagücü | Tevfik Sırrı Gür Stadium, Mersin |
| Wednesday, 14:15 | Levent Arıkdoğan 19' | Report | | Referee: Kemal Kaya |

| 13 December 1972 Round 2 Leg 1 | Mersin İdmanyurdu | 0 – 0 | Gaziantepspor | Tevfik Sırrı Gür Stadium, Mersin |
| Wednesday, 13:30 | | Report | | Referee: Yılmaz Sekman |

| 27 December 1972 Round 2 Leg 2 | Gaziantepspor | 2 – 0 | Mersin İdmanyurdu | Kamil Ocak Stadium, Gaziantep |
| Wednesday, 13:30 | Abdullah Çevrim 57'; Muammer Adatepe 75' | Report | | Referee: Nihat Özbirgül |

Source: 1972–73 Turkish Cup pages.

== Management ==
=== Club management ===
Mehmet Karamehmet was club president

=== Coaching team ===
1972–73 Mersin İdmanyurdu head coaches:

| Nat | Head coach | Period | Pl | W | D | L | Notes |
|---|---|---|---|---|---|---|---|
| (Turkey) | Nazım Koka | 01.08.1972 – 31.05.1973 | | | | | |

Note: Only official games were included.

== 1972–73 squad ==
Stats are counted for 1972–73 First League matches and 1972–73 Turkish Cup (Türkiye Kupası) matches. In the team rosters five substitutes were allowed to appear, two of whom were substitutable. Only the players who appeared in game rosters were included and listed in the order of appearance.

| O | N | Nat | Name | Birth | Born | Pos | LA | LG | CA | CG | TA | TG | Booked | Sent off (straight red) | ← Season Notes → |
|---|---|---|---|---|---|---|---|---|---|---|---|---|---|---|---|
| 1 | 1 | (Turkey) | Yılmaz Urul | 1942 | | GK | 23 | | 2 | | 25 | | | | 1972 ST İstanbulspor. |
| 2 | 2 | (Turkey) | Akın Aksaçlı | 1947 | | DF | 28 | 1 | 3 | | 31 | 1 | | | → previous season. |
| 3 | 3 | (Turkey) | Cihat Erbil | 1946 | Alpullu | DF | 24 | | 2 | | 26 | | | | → previous season. |
| 4 | 4 | (Turkey) | Tuncay Mesçi | 1947 | Trabzon | MF | 23 | | 4 | | 27 | | | | 1972 ST Ankaragücü. |
| 5 | 5 | (Turkey) | Necdet Aykut | 1947 | | MF | 17 | 4 | 1 | | 18 | 4 | | | 1972 ST Gençlerbirliği. |
| 6 | 6 | (Turkey) | Refik Çoğum | 1940 | | MF | 20 | | 1 | | 21 | | | | → previous season. |
| 7 | 7 | (Turkey) | Davut Şahin | 1948 | | FW | 20 | | 3 | | 23 | | | | 1972 ST Beşiktaş. |
| 8 | 8 | (Turkey) | Ömer Tokgöz | 1947 | | FW | 19 | 1 | 2 | | 21 | 1 | | | → previous season. |
| 9 | 9 | (Turkey) | Zeki Temizer | 1945 | Istanbul | FW | 29 | 8 | 2 | | 31 | 8 | | 1 | → previous season. |
| 10 | 10 | (Turkey) | Ayhan Öz | 20 Jul 1945 | Mersin | FW | 15 | 1 | 1 | 1 | 16 | 2 | | 1 | → previous season. |
| 11 | 11 | (Turkey) | Güray Erdener | 12 Jan 1944 | Çanakkale | FW | 30 | 4 | 3 | | 33 | 4 | | | → previous season. |
| 12 | 13 | (Turkey) | Burhan Çetinkaya | 1952 | Trabzon | FW | 23 | 2 | 2 | | 25 | 2 | | | 1972 ST Zonguldakspor. |
| 13 | 8 | (Turkey) | İbrahim Arayıcı | 1949 | Silifke | FW | 20 | 2 | 3 | | 23 | 2 | | 1 | → previous season. |
| 14 | 11 | (Turkey) | Alp Sümeralp | 1938 | Istanbul | FW | 19 | 3 | 4 | | 23 | 3 | | | → previous season. |
| 15 | 13 | (Turkey) | Remzi Sezer | | | MF | 8 | 2 | | | 8 | 2 | | | → previous season. |
| 16 | 3 | (Turkey) | Erol Evcimen | 1944 | | DF | 13 | | 3 | | 16 | | | | → previous season. |
| 17 | 7 | (Turkey) | Erol Durmuşlu | 1 Nov 1950 | Silifke | FW | 10 | | 2 | | 12 | | | | → previous season. |
| 18 | 4 | (Turkey) | Levent Arıkdoğan | 23 Aug 1953 | Mersin | MF | 1 | | 1 | 1 | 2 | 1 | | | First time professional. |
| 19 | 1 | (Turkey) | Fikret Özdil | 1943 | | GK | 8 | | 2 | | 10 | | | | → previous season. |
| 20 | 5 | (Turkey) | Halit Kutlu | | | MF | 12 | | 2 | | 14 | | | 1 | → previous season. |
| 21 | 9 | (Turkey) | Mehmet Şilan | 17 Dec 1955 | Mersin | FW | 1 | | | | 1 | | | | → previous season. |

Sources: 1972–73 season squad data from maçkolik com, Milliyet, and Erbil (1975).

Transfer news from Milliyet:

- Before the season goalkeeper Yılmaz was transfreed from İstanbulspor. Defender Selahattin from Vefa. Necdet from Gençlerbirliği.
- Transfers out: B.Erol (free).

== See also ==
- Football in Turkey
