= Brian Birch =

English footballer and manager

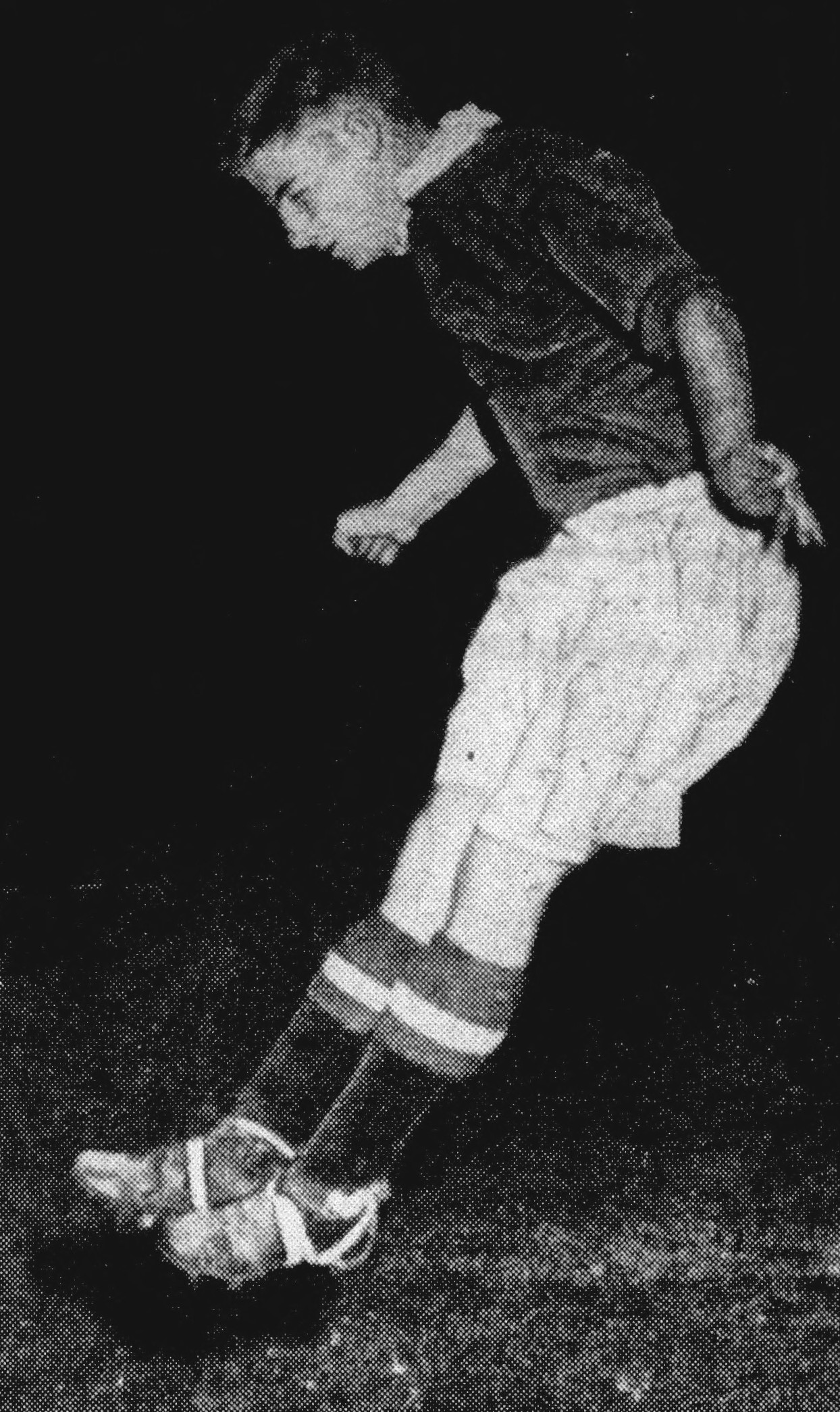
- Birch in 1950

Personal information
- Date of birth: 18 November 1931
- Place of birth: Salford, Lancashire, England
- Date of death: 1989 (aged 57–58)
- Place of death: Johannesburg, South Africa
- Height: 5 ft 6 in (1.68 m)
- Position: Inside forward

Youth career
- 1946–1948: Manchester United

Senior career*
Years	Team	Apps	(Gls)
1948–1952	Manchester United	11	(4)
1952	Wolverhampton Wanderers	3	(1)
1952–1955	Lincoln City	56	(15)
1955–1956	Boston United	?	(?)
1956–1958	Barrow	60	(27)
1958–1960	Exeter City	19	(1)
1960–1961	Oldham Athletic	35	(10)
1961–1962	Rochdale	11	(0)

Managerial career
- 1971–1974: Galatasaray
- 1976–1977: Helsingborg
- 1977–1979: Ethnikos Piraeus
- 1980–1982: Galatasaray
- 1987: Ankaragücü
- * Club domestic league appearances and goals

Brian Birch (18 November 1931–1989) was an English footballer who played for several English clubs in the late 1940s, 1950s and early 1960s.

Born in Salford, Birch joined Manchester United as a 14-year-old in May 1946, before turning professional two years later. He was 17 when he made his debut on 27 August 1949, playing at inside left in a 1–1 home draw with West Bromwich Albion. Birch was always on the fringes of the United first team, but apart from a spell midway through the 1950–51 season in which he scored four goals in nine appearances, he never lived up to his potential and was sold to Wolverhampton Wanderers for £10,000 towards the end of the 1951–52 season. His tenure at Wolves was short, however, and he was transferred to Lincoln City after just nine months in the West Midlands.

In three years with Lincoln, Birch played in more than fifty matches, scoring 15 goals. He then dropped out of league football for a season in 1955, joining Boston United, before moving to Barrow in 1956. He became a first team regular at Barrow, making 60 appearances and scoring 27 goals in just over two seasons there. Exeter City signed him in September 1958, but he was on the move again in January 1960, this time to Oldham Athletic. He moved to Rochdale in March 1961, before going into coaching at the end of the 1961–62 season.

He dipped in and out of playing for the next few years, picking up appearances for Boston United, Mossley and Ellesmere Port, but his coaching experience eventually led him to Blackburn Rovers in 1967, where he became the coach to one of the club's junior teams.

Birch was trainer of Galatasaray from 1971 to 1974. He won three consecutive championships (became the first trainer who managed this) with Galatasaray in the Turkish First League and Helsingborgs IF. In the summer of 1980 he returned to Galatasaray, but was not able to be successful like he was in the 1970s with the club and his contract was terminated after one and a half years. He managed the Turkish club Ankaragücü for three matches in 1987.

== Death and legacy ==
His date of death remained uncertain for years, rumors varying between 1992 and 2019, but a former footballer coached by Birch in Swaraj FC revealed that he died in 1989 of a heart attack. His former team Galatasaray redesigned Birch's sweatshirt he used in 1980-81 season, as a part of the entire 1980-81 kit recreation.

== Honours ==
Galatasaray

- Turkish Super League: 1970–71, 1971–72, 1972–73
- Turkish Cup: 1972–73
- Turkish Super Cup: 1972
- 50th Anniversary Cup: 1973
