= Doping in association football =

The use of performance-enhancing drugs in association football occurres since the 1920s. There was a low amount of unannounced drug testing and lack of sample preservation for a long period respectively still now in many areas. There were also no further investigations or consequences in the Operación Puerto doping case or other revelations. Another cause for concern is and was the widespread use of painkillers. However, they are legal.

== International associations ==
=== FIFA ===
In the run-up to the 2006 FIFA World Cup, the FIFA Congress ratified the World Anti-Doping Agency (WADA) code, being the last of the Olympic sports to agree to "anti-doping". FIFA applies the minimum two-year ban for first-time offenders, although there are exceptions. When a player accused of doping can prove the substance was not intended to enhance performance, FIFA can reduce the sanction to a warning in a first offence, a two-year ban for a second offense and lifetime ban in case of repetition.

In 2014, the biological passport was introduced in the 2014 World Cup: blood and urine samples from all players before the competition and from two players per team and per match are analysed by the Swiss Laboratory for Doping Analyses.

=== UEFA ===
Since the introduction of confederation competitions in 1955–56 season, the UEFA's anti-doping controls were applied only in final matches if the European governing body considered it necessary. Since 1987–88 season, those controls became mandatory and systematics at all stages of the tournaments, and even executed without prior notice to representative teams at club and international level.

UEFA announced three doping cases for its competitions in the 2006–07 season, four less than in the previous season. The three failed tests compromised two cases of cannabis and one for a high concentration of Betamethasone in a UEFA Euro 2008 qualifier. In the 2006–07, UEFA carried out 1,662 tests in and out of competitions, including 938 players tested for the blood doping substance EPO.

== Doping history in world cups ==
=== World Cup 1954 ===
A study titled "Doping in Germany from 1950 to today", published in August 2013, stated that some members of the West Germany national team received injections during their successful world cup 1954. Erik Eggers, who wrote about the pre-anabolic period in the study, was sure that the injections did not contain vitamin C ("They could have just eaten an orange") but assumed that they contained Pervitin: "If you take a look at newspaper reports back then and also the sports scientific environment plus the descriptions of team doctor Franz Loogen, you have to assume that amphetamines were administered." The study also stated that Pervitin (an upper, also used massively by soldiers in World War 2) was widespread in German football in the 1940s. The study, 800 pages in length and costing 450.000 Euro, was done by Berlin's Humboldt University and financed by the institute of sports science.

=== World Cup 1982 and 1986 ===
Mohammed Kaci Saïd, Djamel Menad, Tedj Bensaoula, Medi Cerbah, Mohamed Chaib, Salah Larbès, Abdelkader Tlemçani, members of Algeria’s national side in the 1980s, claim that they were given performance-enhancing drugs. They suspect this to be the reason why they all fathered disabled children. Chaib, father of three disabled children, demanded the medical records and was told they did not exist anymore. Rashid Hanafi, team doctor back then, also suspected there were suspicious practices going on. He told CNN that he was "not allowed to take a look at the medical records of the players any more when Rogov took over as coach in 1981". Alexander Tabartschuk, main doctor of the team, said he only handed vitamins. Algeria fell victim to the Disgrace of Gijón in 1982 and won the African Cup eight years later.

1987 Toni Schumacher recounted a huge amount of hormones, pills and injections (Liesen, head of the doctor team, injected 3000 himself) being used by national players during the World Cup 1986 in Mexico.

=== World Cup 1994 and 1998 ===
Argentina took "speedy coffee" before the qualifier for the world cup 1994 against Australia, at least this is what Maradona said in May 2011. It should make them run faster, but also caused sleeping problems. He also found it suspicious that only the deciding match (against Australia) had no anti-doping control. Grondona, chairman of AFA back then, responded that there were no tests because Maradona, who already had a drug history, might not have passed. Maradona tested positive in the World Cup. In the same year former athlete Edwin Klein published a book called "red card for the German Football Association". Here, several witnesses told about multiple doping offences in German football.

Right after the World Cup 1998, all of the drug testing samples were destroyed. If the same would have happened in the Tour de France, Armstrong would not have been caught, former WADA director Dr. Alain Garnier argued. Marie-Georges Buffet, sports minister at that time, also recalls that she felt pressurised when she initiated an unannounced test in December 1997. There were no more unannounced tests after that. Jean-Pierre Paclet, physician of Les Bleus in 1998, mentions "abnormal haematocrit values" in his book. Gary Neville, former English international, recalled that "some of the players started taking injections from (...) a Frenchman called Dr Rougier". After some felt an energy boost, there was "a queue to see the doctor before the Argentina match". At this time, many players worried about the increase of intensity and physical stress in football.

== Doping history in football clubs ==
=== 1920s ===
Arsenal had an FA Cup encounter against West Ham United in 1925. Arsenal had finished the previous season at rank 19 and manager Leslie Knighton was pessimistic about their chances of winning. He obtained pills from a "distinguished West End doctor" and tested them by himself. After taking one, he "felt that he could push down a wall with his fists". He handed them to his team and they, according to his 1948 memoir, transformed into "lively young lions". Unfortunately for them, the game was postponed due to fog and finally ended in a draw the next day.

=== 1950s ===
In 1958, Gerardo Ottani made a survey. In this survey, 27% of the professionals from the Italian leagues were consuming amphetamines. 68% were using anabolic steroids and 62% were taking stimulants that effected respiration and cardiac output. Ottani was employed at Bologna and switched to a medical profession after his career.

=== 1960s ===
==== Italy ====
In the 1960s, Inter Milan has its greatest period of success known as [La] Grande Inter ("Great Inter"), achieved when Helenio Herrera was their manager and that previously coached teams like Atletico Madrid and Barcelona. He won seven trophies with the club. In 2004, Ferruccio Mazzola, that played mostly for teams like SS Lazio, Venezia and Fiorentina and with Inter for only one match during that period, many years after Herrera death and on the occasion of the release of his new book, accused him of distributing pills that probably were performance-enhancing drugs, assuming there were amphetamines, among the team players, especially the substitute players "who often served as guinea pigs for trying new pills and see if they worked." When he found out that some in the team were spitting them out, he dissolved them in coffee to make sure they were consumed, a practice known as Caffè di Herrera ("Herrera's Coffee"). Most of the former players denied the accusations. In 2010, Inter sued Mazzola for defamation but lost the case, the court believed him. One of the reasons he spoke up were the serious medical conditions and deaths of some of his former members and also in other teams, especially Lazio and Fiorentina, where he played and with AS Roma where Herrera later coached, that he presumed were correlated: Giuliano Taccola (25 years old with AS Roma, never played for Inter), then team's captain Armando Picchi (died aged 36 due to cancer), Marcello Giusti, Carlo Tagnin (67 years old), Mauro Bicicli (66 years old), Ferdinando Miniussi (60 years old for Cirrhosis, goalkeeper), Enea Masiero (75 years old) and Pino Longoni (63 years old, never played for Inter first squad). He suspected the drugs, or whatever those were, to be the cause of their sufferings. In 2015, his brother Sandro, who denied everything at the beginning, admitted that he was right and that he had some health problems at that time and he did not know why, but later in 2017 changed his version and said that there were nothing important and that those practices were not that effective and that the real doping from Herrera was psychological, making them believe how strong they really were, and that his younger brother had reasons for revenge against Inter.

==== England ====
Everton, one of the top clubs in the English football league, were champions of the 1962–63 season, and it was done, according to a national newspaper investigation, with the help of Benzedrine. Word spread after Everton's win that the drug had been involved. The newspaper investigated, cited where the reporter believed it had come from, and quoted the goalkeeper, Albert Dunlop, as saying:

I cannot remember how they first came to be offered to us. But they were distributed in the dressing rooms. We didn't have to take them but most of the players did. The tablets were mostly white but once or twice they were yellow. They were used through the 1961–62 season and the championship season which followed it. Drug-taking had previously been virtually unnamed in the club. But once it had started we could have as many tablets as we liked. On match days they were handed out to most players as a matter of course. Soon some of the players could not do without the drugs.

The club agreed that drugs had been used but that they "could not possibly have had any harmful effect." Dunlop, however, said he had become an addict.

=== 1970s ===
==== Netherlands ====
Performance-enhancing drugs were used on a regular basis according to witnesses of that period, mostly in Ajax, Feyenoord and AZ Alkmaar during competitive matches, including the 1970 and 1972 Intercontinental Cups won by the first two cited clubs. Jan Peters recounted drug use before the big games. They seemed to work as he felt energy boosts and euphoria. Johnny Rep, former Ajax player, claimed that "everyone was on something". He recounted injections for everyone on 1 November 1979, ahead of a match of his team, Saint-Etienne, against PSV Eindhoven. Pierre Poty, who was physician of the club at that time, also revealed that he worked with uppers and reasoned it with the fantastic effects. Fritz Kessel, also physician, worked for the Dutch national side for 30 years and revealed that drugs were common in the 1974 and 1978 FIFA World Cups. He said that to Guido Derksen, writer of Voetbal Mysteries, who wrote that players "consumed tons of amphetamines."

==== West Germany ====
An investigative commission of sports medicine in Freiburg claims that in the late 1970s and in the 1980s Stuttgart and Freiburg football clubs were operating with Anabolika. VfB Stuttgart reordered Anabolika at least once.

==== East Germany ====
Falko Götz, a former BFC Dynamo player and later coach in the Bundesliga for Hertha BSC and 1. FC Nürnberg, denied any active knowledge, but admitted to having been administered substances declared to be vitamins in his active time with the club. Gerd Weber, a former SG Dynamo Dresden player, is one of the few former East German football players to have openly confirmed that doping occurred in East German football. Weber has stated that East German footballers were regularly administered white pills before international matches. SG Dynamo Dresden players were allegedly administered the psycho-stimulant Oxytocin before the team's European Cup match against Partizan Belgrade in September 1978.

==== Turkey (Galatasaray) ====
At the end of the 1972–73 season, Galatasaray, under English manager Brian Birch and featuring key player such as Metin Kurt, achieved the first league three-peat in Süper Lig history by winning the 1970–71, 1971–72 and 1972–73.

In 2005, the president of the Turkish Anti-Doping Centre incriminated before the parliamentary inquiry committee of the TBMM that between 1971 and 1974, Galatasaray players were treated with doping substances supplied by Birch from England, which enabled them to achieve the championship title hat-trick. The administration of Birch’s medication was confirmed by substitute player Yıldo, who was part of the Galatasaray squad between 1970 and 1972, though he did not know whether the substances were doping substances or vitamins. Following the departure of team manager Birch, one Galatasaray player after another fell ill for unspecified reasons.

In 2009, Metin Kurt, a key player in Galatasaray’s championship-winning team, confirmed in his published autobiography that he had taken doping substances in the form of pills and injections. His teammates at Galatasaray were also given pills and injections, but Kurt denied that Brian Birch was responsible for the doping. Kurt held Galatasaray club officials and their team staff responsible for the doping practices at the club during his playing years.

Furthermore, according to Kurt’s account, Galatasaray goalkeeper Turgay Şeren (1947–1967) initiated the doping practice at Galatasaray by demanding an injection before a match, which led to the doping practice at Galatasaray becoming increasingly systematic.

=== 1980s ===
==== East Germany ====
Unlike other sports in the former East Germany, football did not have a government-run doping program due to the fact that football was not seen as internationally successful enough to justify the expense. Doping was carried out sporadically in football and from 1985, doping tests were carried out to prevent this practice.

The head of the East German sports medicine department Manfred Höppner accused BFC Dynamo and 1. FC Lokomotive Leipzig of doping. According to his statement, when the two teams traveled abroad for their European Cup and UEFA Cup matches in October 1983, a test revealed high traces of Amphetamine and Methamphetamine in 13 of 19 BFC Dynamo players, allegedly administered only two-to-three days before. In 1. FC Lokomotive Leipzig players, only slight traces were found and only on some players. It would also be known that the Anabolic steroid Depot-Turinabol had been administered for several years at 1. FC Union Berlin. Two 1. FC Union Berlin players tested positive for Depot-Turanabol in April 1985.

==== West Germany ====
In 1987, Toni Schumacher wrote about a long-running tradition of doping in the Bundesliga, claiming that lots of players were taking Captagon. He himself experimented with it and the effects were: Increased aggression, lower pain threshold, increased focus, confidence and endurance. The by effect was sleeping problems. In Köln he was chauffeuring his colleagues to the doctor who gave them pills and injections, presumably anabolics and stimulants. In the national team he mentioned a "walking chemist" and hormone use. Despite being supported by Paul Breitner he had to leave Köln after 544 games. Later on, his statements about doping in the Bundesliga were supported by Per Roentved, Hans Werner Moors, Dieter Schatzscheider, Hans-Josef Kapellmann, Peter Neururer, Benno Möhlmann, Uwe Nester, Peter Geyer (who talked about procedure, quantity and side effects), Jürgen Röber, Jürgen Stumm and Peter Harms (both medics).

==== Turkey ====
Denizlispor-Player Mesut Bakkal admitted in his autobiography in March 2020 that he and his teammates took doping substances at the penultimate matchday of season 1986–87 against championship title aspirant Beşiktaş Istanbul. The other aspirant Galatasaray Istanbul promised them „Teşvik primler“ (incentive bonuses) if Beşiktaş would lose points against them. The match ended in a draw and Beşiktaş did lose important points. Therefore, the doped team crucially affected the championship title race. At the end of the season 1986–87 Galatasaray became Süper Lig Champion with one point ahead of Beşiktaş.

=== 1990s ===
==== Italy ====
Juventus won the 1996 UEFA Champions League Final, but the victory remains controversial because of accusations of doping. In November 2004, club doctor Riccardo Agricola was given a 22-month prison sentence and fined €2,000 for sporting fraud by providing performance-enhancing drugs, specifically EPO, to players between 1994 and 1998. Leading hematologist Giuseppe d'Onofrio said that it was "practically certain" that midfielders Antonio Conte and Alessio Tacchinardi had taken EPO to overcome brief bouts of anemia, and that it was "very probable" that seven other players – Alessandro Birindelli, Alessandro Del Piero, Didier Deschamps, Dimas, Paolo Montero, Gianluca Pessotto and Moreno Torricelli – had taken EPO in small doses. In 2005, Juventus team doctor Riccardo Agricola and managing director Antonio Giraudo have both been cleared of sporting fraud by Turin's court of appeal and thus officially overturned all previous convictions. The court overturned Agricola's previous conviction for administering banned substances to players between 1994 and 1998, including the hormone EPO, which stimulates the body's production of red blood cells. He was given a 22-month suspended prison sentence in November 2004 which was totally overturned by the appeal court ruling. The following appeal presented by the Public Prosecutor to the Italian Supreme Court against the second degree sentence, despite the fact that the illegitimate administration of drugs to footballers aimed at altering sports results was proven, the statute of limitations for the crime then came in 2006 due to exceeding the terms.

==== France ====
At Olympique Marseille, doping also took place according to Marcel Desailly, Jean-Jaques Eydelie, Chris Waddle and Tony Cascarino. They mentioned stimulants taken prior to their big games, which made them more energetic and keen. According to Eydelie, "all (of them) took a series of injections" in the Champions League Final 1993, except Rudi Völler. All this was no surprise for Arsene Wenger, who said everyone in France assumed something like that going on. Additionally, Desailly and Cascarino claimed that Bernard Tapie, the president himself, distributed pills and injections. Author Mondenard also mentioned "injections for everyone". Tapie only admitted that some players took Captagon.

==== Turkey ====
On the way to the cup final of 1998–99 Turkish Cup, Galatasaray footballer Hasan Şaş tested positive for doping during the semi-final matches and also provided an assist, for which he was later handed a six-month ban for doping and missed the cup final. Furthermore, Galatasaray’s team doctor was held partly responsible for the doping case and banned for one year.

=== 2000s ===
==== Italy ====
There were a couple of athletes caught in the Top Italian football league having too high Nandrolon values. Among them were Pep Guardiola, Edgar Davids, Frank de Boer, Manuele Blasi, Mohamed Kallon, and Jaap Stam. The substance was also found in samples of Premier League professionals who just got warnings.

Former Parma midfielder Matias Almeyda made revelations about allegedly vitamins that they were given at Parma: "They said it was a mixture of vitamins, but before entering the field I was able to jump up as high as the ceiling."

==== Spain ====
French newspaper Le Monde alleges that in the course of investigating Operation Puerto, a doping bust primarily focused on cycling, extensive documentation was found of "seasonal preparation plans" for Real Madrid and Barcelona that include notation suggesting doping practices. Sources suggest that of the 200 sportspersons implicated in Operation Puerto, approximately 50 were cyclists (including notable names such as Ivan Basso and Tyler Hamilton) and the remaining 150 were from other sporting codes, including football. The football players were never pursued in the investigation, leading to claims of double standards between sports. 2013 it had been announced that Fuentes received up to €327,000 annually from Real Sociedad. This was detected by auditors from Ernst & Young at the behest of Iñaki Badiola, president of the club in 2008. The documentation of the doctor also contained the inscriptions "RSOC" a couple of times and "Cuentas [bills] Asti" which most probably stands for Astiazarán, president of the club from 2000 to 2005. In 2003 Real Sociedad finished second in the Spanish League, missing the title by two points. The inscription "Milan" probably referring to AC Milan was also found, with the order to buy from Fuentes the growth-stimulating hormone (IG) in 2005.

Luis Garcia del Moral was official team doctor of US Postal from 1999 to 2003. He, Pepe Marti and Michelle Ferrari were accused of possessing and distributing performance enhancing drugs. In the homepage of Performa SportConsulting, del Moral was also listed as advisor of the Valencia and Barcelona football clubs.

==== Germany ====
In 2008, Tim Meyer examined the blood of over 500 footballers from the Bundesliga. The investigation was voluntary and anonymous. Every test person was free to withdraw from the study whenever he wanted. Finally, 467 players participated to the end. Six samples from the start of the season and two later samples showed haematocrit values of over 50% (limit at the International Cycling Federation). Nine samples showed a haemoglobin value of over 17 grams per deciliter (limit at the International Ski Federation).

=== 2010s ===
At least ten percent of football professionals from Sweden, Germany, and Spain used performance enhancing drugs in the year 2014. 93% were controlled once or never in that year. This is according to an analysis of strictly anonymous questionaries completed by 124 athletes. For this study, the Randomized Response Technique was used.

=== 2020s ===
==== Italy ====
Alejandro Dario Gómez tested positive for Terbutalin in 2023. Some months later, Paul Pogba's test showed an increased testosterone value. The World Champions were employed at Monza and Juventus.

==== England ====
Mykhailo Mudryk was banned from October 2024 to July 2026 for having a low concentration of meldonium.

There were no sanctions when two professionals playing in the top four tiers of English football got caught for performance enhancing substances in the 2023/24 season.One tested positive after a game, the other in an out-of-competition-test.

== Research ==
=== Endurance ===
Successful players perform more high intensity runs and sprints during a match. Furthermore it was found that substitute players perform proportionally more quick runs than players who play the whole match. After intense periods, high intensity runs descended.

In an analysis of 370 Premier League players, researchers looked closely at the distance that was covered in high velocity. The 90 minutes were divided into six 15 minute periods. Athletes completed less distance in high velocity in the second half in all periods. In the last 15 minutes of the first and second half, the high velocity distance was 17 respectively 21 percent lower than in the first 15 minutes. In addition, the recovery time (that averaged 72 seconds) in the last 15 minutes of the game went up: it was 28 percent longer. Improved endurance via analeptic amines or Epo along with scientific training would mean less recovery time between sprints, the ability to cover more distance in high velocity, and freshness in the final phase.

In a study from the Journal of Sports Medicine 14700 Premier League performances between the season 2006 and 2012 were analysed. Improved endurance was found: In the year 2012, the distance covered in maximum velocity was 35% higher than 2006. The number of sprints increased even more. In the 2011/12 Premier league season there were offense players who completed slightly more than 3210 minutes on the field like Luka Modric or Victor Moses (ranked twenty-third in this category that season). 3210 minutes are equal to 35,6 full games, that would be approximately 40.976 metres at high speed and 12.483 metres covered in maximum velocity during this season according to the mentioned study of Sports Medicine. However, this doesn't include the FA cup, other league cups, UEFA competitions, or appearances for the national team. Both athletes never tested positive and are used just as an example to understand the performance requirements in this sport.

=== Strength ===
In ten carefully selected studies a correlation between leg strength and shot accuracy was found. Strength can be improved with many different training exercises, but also by means of anabolic substances and steroids.

=== Velocity ===
There seems to be no connection between thigh circumference and quickness. Beyond that, researchers from the Faculty of Sports Science of Shiga found a correlation between high knee extension relative strength and low 100 m time.

== Controls ==
All of the samples from the World Cup 1998 have been destroyed after three months. The same procedure took place in the tournaments of 2002, 2006, and 2010. The tests are organised by the FIFA while the WADA just has the observer status. If there would be a positive test during Sepp Blatters era, the result would be submitted to Himself and his chief physician. Then they would make the decision if WADA will be informed. Then and today (effective July2026) only the FIFA has the right to publish results. In Germany, there were no blood tests prior to 2012. 2013 the DFB conducted 500 controls for 1000 players in training.

2014 93% of professional players have been controlled only once or never in the season (see 2010s), according to an anonymous survey.

Generally, only unexpected controls are useful. If tests are expected, it is easy not to have any substances left in the system. The USOC made experiments about how long tests are positive many years ago in 1983. One of the substances that is not detectable for long is EPO: It has "a four-hour half-life", according to Lance Armstrong, "so it leaves the body very quickly".

England

In 2011, then World Anti-Doping Agency's president John Fahey and director-general David Howman criticised that the testing procedures of the FA are not rigorous enough. They further complained about infrequent testing for EPO. The football authorities countered that they were testing urine and blood including for EPO, as recommended by the World Anti Doping Agency.

The tests were "randomly, 70% of the time away from matches, at training sessions or players' homes, as recommended by Wada". Back then, the FA carried out 1.278 tests overall with "the policy is to test the Premier League more than any other". However, the Premier league had about 550 athletes and the English Football League and the Women's leagues had about 2200 respectively 50 athletes at that time, so while the quality of the tests seemed to be very good, the quantity was not appropriate. In 2023, there were 2.176 tests (982 of them in the Premier League), 1570 of them out of competition. In comparison, there were 600 tests for 166 riders throughout the Tour de France and 360 the month before the event, some of them at night. Within the roughly 1.000 professional cyclists in the world each one had on average three to four tests per year. However, the best riders had way more than that.

In 2016, 164 out of 530 athletes from the Premier League did not have to undergo a drug test during the season. However, it is the only worldwide football league where players can be tested at home and have to announce their whereabouts in advance. There was also three times more out of competition testing than in Germany.

== Individual cases and programs by country ==
=== Albania ===
Besa defender Alban Dragusha was suspended for 24 months by UEFA after failing a test on 19 July 2007 for a high concentration of nandrolone metabolites after a UEFA Cup match in Belgrade.

=== Argentina ===
Arguably the most high-profile case of doping in world football is the one of Diego Maradona at the 1994 FIFA World Cup in the United States, who was immediately suspended and later sanctioned for 18 months for intake of ephedrine. Maradona was also suspended for 15 months in 1991 after a failed doping test for cocaine while playing for Napoli in Italy.

=== Australia ===
In January 2007, Stan Lazaridis, playing for Perth Glory, failed a drug test for prescription alopecia medication, which is banned due to its potential as a masking agent for other performance-enhancing substances. He was found guilty by Australian Sports Anti-Doping Authority and was given a 12-month suspension from football. He had not taken the prohibited substance to mask a performance-enhancing drug but for legitimate therapeutic purposes as prescribed by his doctor. However, the tribunal held that an anti-doping violation had occurred and ordered the player ineligible to play for 12 months, backdated to the date of his failed test.

=== England ===
==== Testing Programmes in England ====
So far, only one Premier League player has ever failed a test for using performance-enhancing drugs in a league match. According to a statement of one of UK Sport's Independent Sampling Officers (ISO), "If a club knows in advance we're coming, and the club suspects one of their players, they keep him off training and his name doesn't appear on the list I am given." In the 1999–2000 season, testers were present at just 32 of the over 3,500 league matches, taking samples from two players of each side. Compared to other sports in the UK, like cricket, cycling or athletics, footballers are far less likely to be tested. A case of high-profile was the one of Rio Ferdinand, who missed a drug test in September 2003 and found himself punished for it, being banned for eight months.

In July 2009, the FA was in talks with the World Anti-Doping Agency (WADA) over the FA's proposal to comply with the WADA international anti-doping code (as other UK sports such as rugby, golf and tennis have already done). The FA was at the time under pressure from organisations including UK sport and Sport England to comply with the code and to put forward the first 30 players of the England national team for testing.

A dispute deals with the rules surrounding footballers in the testing pool: Should footballers have drug testing on randomly selected days (so athletes must state their whereabouts for an hour every day) as in other WADA-compliant sports, or should testing merely take place each week at club training?

==== Cases in England ====
In the 2002–03 season, Rushden & Diamonds goalkeeper Billy Turley was let off with a mere warning after being found to have taken the anabolic steroid nandrolone. He was later banned for six months for failing a test for cocaine, which is deemed to be a recreational drug, becoming the only player so far to be banned after a domestic league match.

Middlesbrough's Abel Xavier was banned in November 2005 from football for 18 months by UEFA for taking anabolic steroids after failing a test for dianabol after a UEFA Cup match on 29 September 2005. He is the first player in Premier League history to be banned for using performance-enhancing substances, as opposed to recreational drugs.

Adrian Mutu of Chelsea was banned after he failed a test for cocaine in the 2003–04 season. He was banned for seven months and was subsequently released by Chelsea.

In 2016, after a UEFA Europa League match, Liverpool's Mamadou Sakho was alleged to have taken a fat-burning banned drug. However, on later investigation, UEFA opted to dismiss all charges.

=== France ===
Jean-Jacques Eydelie, who played for Marseille in the 1–0 final victory over Milan in Munich in the 1993 UEFA Champions League Final, said in L'Equipe magazine in January 2006, that he and several teammates received injections before the match, implying premeditated doping. Former Marseille club president Bernard Tapie has taken legal action over articles suggesting players were given doping substances.

=== Germany ===
Peter Neururer, a coach in the German Bundesliga, accused players of his former club Schalke 04 of doping, alleging that almost all players in the club in the late 1980s took Captagon, an illegal substance in most countries, including Germany. Jens Lehmann, then a young player with the club, confirmed the allegations. The German Football Association requested Neururer to release names of players involved in doping. Schalke 04 denied the allegations. Two former team doctors of Eintracht Braunschweig confessed administering Captagon to players of the club in the 1970s and '80s.

Germany national team head coach Joachim Löw insisted he has never seen an example of drug-abuse in German football.

Doping tests have been carried out in the Bundesliga since 1988, and after selected matches, two players are chosen at random to provide a urine sample. In the 2006–07 season, tests were carried out after 241 of 612 first and second division matches. Since 1995, 15 players from the Bundesliga's first and second divisions have been accused of doping offences.

=== Italy ===
According to the Gazzetta dello Sport, the death of four former Fiorentina players over the past nineteen years were suspicious. Pino Longoni died at age 63 after suffering from an irreversible degenerative illness which narrowed the arteries in his brain; Bruno Beatrice died of leukaemia in 1987 aged 39; Nello Saltutti died after suffering a heart attack in 2003 aged 56; and Ugo Ferrante died in November 2004 of cancer of the tonsils aged 59. The Italian newspaper claimed their illnesses may have been brought on by Cortex and Micoren, drugs that were allegedly administered by Fiorentina's medical staff in the 1970s. However, Turin prosecutor Raffaele Guariniello, who has led Italy's fight against drug-taking in sport since 1998, said without hard evidence the Gazzetta's claims that the deaths might be linked to doping were presumptuous.

== See also ==
- Category:Doping cases in association football
