= 1973–74 Mersin İdmanyurdu season =

Mersin İdmanyurdu
1973–74 season
- President: Mehmet Karamehmet
- Coach: Tomislav Kaloperović
- Stadium: Mersin, Turkey
- First League: 15th (Relegated)
- Turkish Cup: Did not participate
- Top goalscorer: Şeref Başoğlu (5)
Home colours	Away colours	Third colours

Mersin İdmanyurdu (also Mersin İdman Yurdu, Mersin İY, or MİY) Sports Club; located in Mersin, east Mediterranean coast of Turkey in 1973–74. The 1973–74 season was the sixth season of Mersin İdmanyurdu (MİY) football team in Turkish First Football League, the first level division in Turkey. They have relegated to second division at the end of the season.

The club address was "Azakhan No: 4", Tel.: 1321. Executive committee: Mehmet Karamehmet (president), Mahir Turhan, Ünal Şıhman, Atilla Taşpınar, Kayhan Okdar, Aydın Özlü, Alptekin Ürgüplü, Yaman Atalay, Sadık Eliyeşil, Mehmet Emin Yıldız, Mustafa Elgin, Erol Tarhan, Reşat Çağlı, Sungur Baydur, Kemal Saraçoğlu.

At the start of the season Motrock Ivon was the coach. He managed the team for three games. He was followed by Nazım Koka. He managed the team for 17 games. After 20th round, Toma Kaloperoviç became the coach on 14.03.1974. Kaloperoviç finished the season.

== Pre-season ==
Preparation games: MİY-Sakaryaspor: 0-0; MİY-Kocaelispor: 2-2; MİY-Gaziantepspor: 1–0.

- 19.08.1973 - Eskişehirspor-MİY.
- 30.08.1973 - MİY-Adanaspor: 2–0. Goals: Zeki, Burhan.

== 1973–74 First League participation ==
First League was played with 16 teams in its 17th season, 1973–74. Last two teams relegated to Second League 1974–75. Mersin İY finished 15th with 8 wins and relegated to second division next year. MİY finished first half at 14th place. Manager Koka set a target for second half for top ten teams, the team couldn't achieve it. Şeref Başoğlu was the most scorer player with 5 goals.

=== Results summary ===
Mersin İdmanyurdu (MİY) 1973–74 First League summary:

	Overall									Home								Away							
Stage	Pc	Pl	W	D	L	GF	GA	GD	Pt	Pl	W	D	L	GF	GA	GD	Pt	Pl	W	D	L	GF	GA	GD	Pt
First half	14	15	3	5	7	7	11	-4	11	8	3	3	2	6	4	+2	9	7	0	2	5	1	7	-6	2
Second half		15	5	1	8	8	16	-8	11	7	4	1	2	7	6	+1	9	8	1	0	7	1	10	-9	2
Overall	15	30	8	6	16	15	27	-12	22	15	7	4	4	13	10	+3	18	15	1	2	12	2	17	-15	4

Sources: 1973–74 Turkish First Football League pages.

=== League table ===
Mersin İY's league performance in Turkey First League in 1973–74 season is shown in the following table.

Pos	Team	Pld	W	D	L	GF	GA	GD	Pts	Qualification or relegation
12	Giresunspor	30	8	10	12	28	32	−4	26	
13	Göztepe A.Ş.	30	8	10	12	24	28	−4	26	
14	MKE Ankaragücü	30	10	6	14	28	36	−8	26	
15	Mersin İdmanyurdu (R)	30	8	6	16	15	27	−12	22	Relegation to Turkish Second Football League
16	Vefa (R)	30	5	7	18	16	39	−23	17	Relegation to Turkish Second Football League

Rules for classification: 1) points; 2) goal difference; 3) number of goals scored.
(R) Relegated

Note: Won, drawn and lost points are 2, 1 and 0. F belongs to MİY and A belongs to corresponding team for both home and away matches. Champions went to ECC 1974-75, and runners-up and second runners-up became eligible for UEFA Cup 1974-75.

=== Results by round ===
Results of games MİY played in 1973–74 First League by rounds:

Round	1	2	3	4	5	6	7	8	9	10	11	12	13	14	15	16	17	18	19	20	21	22	23	24	25	26	27	28	29	30
Ground	A	H	A	H	H	A	H	H	A	A	H	A	H	H	A	H	A	H	A	A	H	A	A	H	H	A	H	A	A	H
Result	L	L	L	D	W	L	W	W	L	D	L	D	D	D	L	W	L	W	L	L	D	W	L	W	L	L	W	L	L	L
Position	14	16	16	16	15	15	15	10	15	14	15	13	12	12	14	12	13	12	14	15	15	14	15	13	14	14	14	15	15	15

Source: 1973–74 Turkish First Football League pages.
A = Away; H = Home; W = Win; D = Draw; L = Loss

=== First half ===
9 September 1973 Round 1	Adana Demirspor	1 – 0	Mersin İdmanyurdu	City Stadium, Adana
Sunday, 17:00	Rasin Gürcan 5'	Report		Referee: Talat Tokat

16 September 1973 Round 2	Mersin İdmanyurdu	0 – 1	Kayserispor	Tevfik Sırrı Gür Stadium, Mersin
Sunday, 17:00	Akın Aksaçlı (yellow card)	Report	46' Mustafa Yücel; (yellow card) Rızkullah Fakkusoğlu	Attendance: 8.000; Referee: Yılmaz Önen

23 September 1973 Round 3	Bursaspor	2 – 0	Mersin İdmanyurdu	Atatürk Stadium, Bursa
Sunday, 17:15	Orhan Özselek 10'; Yetiş Kaya 89'	Report Referee was later punished because he made a goal decision for a shoot entered from side net.		Referee: Ömer Karadağ

30 September 1973 Round 4	Mersin İdmanyurdu	1 – 1	Boluspor	Tevfik Sırrı Gür Stadium, Mersin
Sunday, 17:00	Akın Aksaçlı 49'; Akın Aksaçlı (yellow card) 13'; Refik Çoğum (yellow card) 38'; Burhan Çetinkaya (yellow card) 73'	Report	50' Rıdvan Ertan; (yellow card) 54' Fikret İsmigüzel	Referee: İbrahim Fırla

7 October 1973 Round 5	Mersin İdmanyurdu	1 – 0	Samsunspor	Tevfik Sırrı Gür Stadium, Mersin
Sunday, 16:30	Necdet Aykut 4'	Report		Referee: Kemal Akay

21 October 1973 Round 6	Ankaragücü	2 – 1	Mersin İdmanyurdu	19 Mayıs Stadium, Ankara
Sunday, 16:15	Tahsin Ünal 9'; Müjdat Yalman 67' (pen.)	Report	82' Necdet Aykut	Attendance: 8.000; Referee: İhsan Türe

28 October 1973 Round 7	Mersin İdmanyurdu	2 – 0	Vefa	Tevfik Sırrı Gür Stadium, Mersin
Sunday, 16:30	Şeref Başoğlu 35'; Necdet Aykut 43'; Zeki Temizer (yellow card) 49'	Report	(yellow card) 78' Muharrem Tosun	Referee: Mazhar Kerestecioğlu

4 November 1973 Round 8	Mersin İdmanyurdu	2 – 1	Eskişehirspor	Tevfik Sırrı Gür Stadium, Mersin
Sunday, 14:30	Burhan Çetinkaya 7'; Zeki Temizer 37'	Report	84' Ömer Kaner	Referee: Müşfik Talas

11 November 1973 Round 9	Giresunspor	1 – 0	Mersin İdmanyurdu	City Stadium, Giresun
Sunday, 14:45.	Bünyamin Çulcu 52'	Report	(red card) 53' Cevher Özer	Attendance: 6.000; Referee: Sabahattin Ladikli

25 November 1973 Round 10	Fenerbahçe	0 – 0	Mersin İdmanyurdu	Mithatpaşa Stadium, İstanbul
Sunday, 14:15	Fuat Saner (yellow card) 50'	Report	(yellow card) 70' Cihat Erbil	Attendance: 41.478; Referee: Macit Sarıdana

2 December 1973 Round 11	Mersin İdmanyurdu	0 – 1	Altay	Tevfik Sırrı Gür Stadium, Mersin
Sunday, 13:30		Report	40' Uğur Güler	Referee: Doğan Babacan

16 December 1973 Round 12	Göztepe	0 – 0	Mersin İdmanyurdu	Atatürk Stadium, İzmir
Sunday, 14:00		Report	(red card) 72' Burhan Çetinkaya	Referee: Erkan Göksel

23 December 1973 Round 13	Mersin İdmanyurdu	0 – 0	Galatasaray	Tevfik Sırrı Gür Stadium, Mersin
Sunday, 13:15	Cihat Erbil (yellow card); Güray Erdener (yellow card)	Report	(yellow card) Mehmet Oğuz; (yellow card) Aydın Güleş; (yellow card) Ekrem Günalp; (yellow card) Bülent Ünder	Attendance: 14.000; Referee: Muzaffer Sarvan

30 December 1973 Round 14	Mersin İdmanyurdu	0 – 0	Adanaspor	Tevfik Sırrı Gür Stadium, Mersin
Sunday, 13:15	Güngör Çelikçiler (yellow card) 44'	Report		Referee: Hilmi Ok

5 January 1974 Round 15	Beşiktaş	1 – 0	Mersin İdmanyurdu	Mithatpaşa Std., Beşiktaş, Istanbul
Saturday, 14:15	Ahmet Yılmaz 37'	Report		Referee: Ziya Türkdoğan

=== Second half ===
10 February 1974 Round 16	Mersin İdmanyurdu	1 – 0	Adana Demirspor	Tevfik Sırrı Gür Stadium, Mersin
Sunday, 14:15	Refik Çoğum 30'; Ömer Tokgöz (yellow card)	Report	(yellow card) Ahmet Yaşar; (yellow card) Rasin Gürcan	Referee: Macit Sarıdana

17 February 1974 Round 17	Kayserispor	2 – 0	Mersin İdmanyurdu	Atatürk Stadium, Kayseri
Sunday, 13:45	Muhittin Köymen 9'; Muhittin Köymen 89'; Canan Açıkgöz (yellow card)	Report		Referee: Rahmi Haliloğlu

24 February 1974 Round 18	Mersin İdmanyurdu	1 – 0	Bursaspor	Tevfik Sırrı Gür Stadium, Mersin
Sunday, 13:45	Necdet Aykut 55'	Report	(red card) 40' Yusuf Çavdar	Referee: Mazhar Kerestecioğlu

3 March 1974 Round 19	Boluspor	1 – 0	Mersin İdmanyurdu	City Stadium, Bolu
Sunday, 12:00	Sinan Alayoğlu 48'	Report	(yellow card) 30' Şeref Başoğlu	Attendance: 4.862; Referee: Ziya Türkdoğan

10 March 1974 Round 20	Samsunspor	1 – 0	Mersin İdmanyurdu	City Stadium, Samsun
Sunday, 13:45	Adem Kurukaya 3'; Bülent Gürsoytrak (yellow card) 58'; Ali Elveren (yellow card) 70'	Report	(penalty missed) 1' Güray Erdener	Referee: Orhan Cebe

17 March 1974 Round 21	Mersin İdmanyurdu	0 – 0	Ankaragücü	Tevfik Sırrı Gür Stadium, Mersin
Sunday, 14:00	Cihat Erbil (yellow card) 54'	Report	(yellow card) 54' Melih Atacan	Referee: İlhan Özkan

23 March 1974 Round 22	Vefa	0 – 1	Mersin İdmanyurdu	İnönü Stadium, Beşiktaş, Istanbul
Saturday, 15:00	Muharrem Tosun (yellow card) 18'	Report	23' Şeref Başoğlu; (yellow card) 27' İbrahim Arayıcı; (yellow card) 59' Cihat Erbil	Referee: Mazhar Kerestecioğlu

31 March 1974 Round 23	Eskişehirspor	2 – 0	Mersin İdmanyurdu	Atatürk Stadium, Eskişehir
Sunday, 13:00	Fethi Heper 45'; Ömer Kaner 52'; Bilal Arular (yellow card) 27'; Ömer Kaner (yellow card) 35'	Report		Attendance: 2.700; Referee: Nihat Özbirgül

7 April 1974 Round 24	Mersin İdmanyurdu	2 – 1	Giresunspor	Tevfik Sırrı Gür Stadium, Mersin
Sunday, 16:00	Kemal Yalçınkaya 15'; Şeref Başoğlu 56'	Report	85' Oğuz Cansever	Referee: Ertuğrul Dilek

14 April 1974 Round 25	Mersin İdmanyurdu	0 – 1	Fenerbahçe	Tevfik Sırrı Gür Stadium, Mersin
Sunday, 16:00	Refik Çoğum (yellow card)	Report	50' Cemil Turan; (yellow card) Cemil Turan	Attendance: 25.000; Referee: Orhan Cebe

21 April 1974 Round 26	Altay	1 – 0	Mersin İdmanyurdu	Atatürk Stadium, İzmir
Sunday, 16:00	Mustafa Denizli 83'	Report		Referee: Hilmi Ok

28 April 1974 Round 27	Mersin İdmanyurdu	1 – 0	Göztepe	Tevfik Sırrı Gür Stadium, Mersin
Sunday, 16:00	Şeref Başoğlu 27'	Report		Referee: Mazhar Kerestecioğlu

12 May 1974 Round 28	Galatasaray	2 – 0	Mersin İdmanyurdu	İnönü Stadium, Beşiktaş, Istanbul
Sunday, 16:00	Metin Kurt 63'; Ahmet Akkuş 82'	Report		Attendance: 4.245; Referee: Muzaffer Sarvan

19 May 1974 Round 29	Adanaspor	1 – 0	Mersin İdmanyurdu	City Stadium, Adana
Sunday, 16:00	Harun Kaya 69'; Harun Kaya (yellow card)	Report		Referee: Ertuğrul Dilek

26 May 1974 Round 30	Mersin İdmanyurdu	2 – 4	Beşiktaş	Tevfik Sırrı Gür Stadium, Mersin
Sunday, 16:00	Erol Durmuşlu 20'; Şeref Başoğlu 43'	Report	38' Đorđe Milić; 80' Vedat Okyar; 85' Mesut Şen; 88' Đorđe Milić	Referee: Fehmi Pazarcı

== 1973–74 Turkish Cup participation ==
1973–74 Turkish Cup was played for the 12th season as Türkiye Kupası by 27 teams. Two elimination rounds and finals were played in two-legs elimination system. Top ten first division teams from previous season participated. Mersin İdmanyurdu did not participate in 1973–74 Turkish Cup because they had finished previous season at 11th place. Fenerbahçe won the Cup for the 2nd time. Bursaspor (as the finalist) became eligible for 1974–75 ECW Cup.

== Management ==
=== Club management ===
Mehmet Karamehmet was club president.

=== Coaching team ===
1973–74 Mersin İdmanyurdu head coaches:

Nat	Head coach	Period	Pl	W	D	L	Notes
(Romania)	Ion Motroc	09.09.1973 – 23.09.1973	3	–	–	3	
(Turkey)	Nazım Koka	30.09.1973 – 10.03.1974	17	5	5	7	
(Socialist Federal Republic of Yugoslavia)	Tomislav Kaloperović	23.03.1974 – 31.05.1974	10	3	1	6	

Note: Only official games were included.

== 1973–74 squad ==
Stats are counted for 1973–74 First League matches. In the team rosters five substitutes were allowed to appear, two of whom were substitutable. Only the players who appeared in game rosters were included and listed in the order of appearance.

O	N	Nat	Name	Birth	Born	Pos	LA	LG	CA	CG	TA	TG	Booked	Sent off (straight red)	← Season Notes →
1	1	(Turkey)	Atıf Öztoprak	8 May 1952	Sakarya	GK	6				6				1973 ST Sakaryaspor.
2	2	(Turkey)	Kemal Yalçınkaya	1948		DF	27	1			27	1			1973 ST PTT.
3	3	(Turkey)	Akın Aksaçlı	1947		DF	13	1			13	1	1		→ previous season.
4	4	(Turkey)	Halit Kutlu			MF	27				27				→ previous season.
5	5	(Turkey)	Şeref Başoğu	1947	Adapazarı	MF	30	5			30	5			1973 ST Sakaryaspor.
6	6	(Turkey)	Refik Çoğum	1940		MF	21	1			21	1	1		→ previous season.
7	7	(Turkey)	İbrahim Arayıcı	1949	Silifke	FW	17				17				→ previous season.
8	8	(Turkey)	Burhan Çetinkaya	1952	Trabzon	FW	18	1			18	1	1	1	→ previous season.
9	9	(Turkey)	Erol Durmuşlu	1 Nov 1950	Silifke	FW	17	1			17	1			→ previous season.
10	10	(Turkey)	Zeki Temizer	1945	Istanbul	FW	29	1			29	1	1		→ previous season.
11	11	(Turkey)	Güray Erdener	12 Jan 1944	Çanakkale	FW	29				29				→ previous season.
12	13	(Turkey)	Hasan Yalçıntaş			DF	1				1				1973 ST Ankaragücü.
13	14	(Turkey)	Necdet Aykut	1947		MF	16	4			16	4			→ previous season.
14	1	(Turkey)	Fikret Özdil	1943		GK	1				1				→ previous season.
15	9	(Turkey)	Ömer Tokgöz	1947		FW	19				19				→ previous season.
16	1	(Turkey)	Güngör Çelikçiler	1945	Üsküdar	GK	23				23				1973 ST Adanaspor.
17	4	(Turkey)	Cihat Erbil	1946	Alpullu	DF	21				21				→ previous season.
18	13	(Turkey)	Levent Arıkdoğan	23 Aug 1953	Mersin	MF	10				10				→ previous season.
19	13	(Turkey)	İrfan Kaynak	1956	Ceyhan	FW	2				2				First time professional.
20	6	(Turkey)	Cevher Özer	1951		MF	19				19			1	1973 SL Fenerbahçe.
21	14	(Turkey)	Davut Şahin	1948		FW	10				10				→ previous season.
22	10	(Turkey)	Adil Özbay			FW	1				1				First time professional.

Sources: 1973–74 season squad data from maçkolik com, Milliyet, and Erbil (1975).

Transfer news from Milliyet:

- Transfers in: Atıf, Şeref (Sakaryaspor), Kemal (PTT), Hasan (Ankaragücü). Cevher (loaned from Fenerbahçe).
- Transfers out: Güray (Adana Demirspor); Tuncay (Trabzonspor).

== See also ==
- Football in Turkey
