= Kordlar, Kaleybar =

Kordlar كردلر
- Village
- Location within Iran
- Coordinates: 38°41′54″N 47°04′46″E
- Country: Iran
- Province: East Azerbaijan
- County: Kaleybar
- Bakhsh: Central
- Rural District: Peyghan Chayi

Population (2006)
  - Total: 153
- Time zone: UTC+3:30 (IRST)
  - Summer (DST): UTC+4:30 (IRDT)

Kordlar (Persian: كردلر; also known as Kūrtar) is a village in Peyghan Chayi Rural District, in the Central District of Kaleybar County, East Azerbaijan Province, Iran. At the 2006 census, its population was 153, in 36 families.
