= 1972–73 1.Lig =

15th season of top-tier Turkish football

1.Lig
- Season: 1972–73
- Champions: Galatasaray; 6th title
- Relegated: Şekerspor; Türk Telekomspor
- European Cup: Galatasaray
- Cup Winners' Cup: Ankaragücü
- UEFA Cup: Fenerbahçe; Eskişehirspor
- Matches: 240
- Goals: 449 (1.87 per match)
- Top goalscorer: Osman Arpacıoğlu (16 goals)

Statistics of the Turkish First Football League for the 1972–73 season.

== Overview ==
It was contested by 16 teams, and Galatasaray S.K. won the championship.

== League table ==
Pos	Team	Pld	W	D	L	GF	GA	GD	Pts	Qualification or relegation
1	Galatasaray (C)	30	19	9	2	47	12	+35	47	Qualification to European Cup first round
2	Fenerbahçe	30	16	10	4	42	17	+25	42	Qualification to UEFA Cup first round
3	Eskişehirspor	30	12	12	6	31	19	+12	36	Qualification to UEFA Cup first round
4	MKE Ankaragücü	30	12	10	8	24	21	+3	34	Qualification to Cup Winners' Cup first round
5	Boluspor	30	12	9	9	37	30	+7	33	Invitation to Balkans Cup
6	Beşiktaş	30	9	13	8	14	18	−4	31	
7	Altay	30	11	8	11	32	23	+9	30	
8	Göztepe A.Ş.	30	11	8	11	33	31	+2	30	
9	Giresunspor	30	11	7	12	27	34	−7	29	
10	Bursaspor	30	6	16	8	27	29	−2	28	
11	Mersin İdmanyurdu	30	8	11	11	26	31	−5	27	
12	Samsunspor	30	8	10	12	21	40	−19	26	
13	Adanaspor	30	7	9	14	24	34	−10	23	
14	Vefa	30	6	10	14	22	35	−13	22	
15	Beypazarı Şekerspor (R)	30	6	10	14	20	38	−18	22	Relegation to Turkish Second Football League
16	Türk Telekomspor (R)	30	4	12	14	22	37	−15	20	Relegation to Turkish Second Football League

Rules for classification: 1) points; 2) goal difference; 3) number of goals scored.
(C) Champions; (R) Relegated

== Results ==
Home \ Away	ADA	ALT	BJK	BOL	BUR	ESK	FNB	GAL	GRS	GÖZ	MİY	AGÜ	PTT	SAM	ŞKR	VEF
Adanaspor		2–0	0–0	1–2	0–0	1–2	1–0	0–1	2–1	2–2	3–0	0–2	1–0	3–1	1–1	0–0
Altay	1–0		3–0	3–0	1–1	0–0	0–1	0–2	5–1	2–0	2–1	3–0	0–0	0–1	2–0	4–1
Beşiktaş	2–1	0–0		1–0	1–1	0–0	0–0	0–3	2–1	0–1	1–0	1–0	1–1	1–0	1–0	1–0
Boluspor	0–0	2–0	1–0		2–1	1–0	1–1	0–0	2–1	1–0	3–3	1–0	1–0	6–0	1–1	5–1
Bursaspor	3–0	0–0	1–1	1–1		0–0	0–0	0–1	0–1	3–2	1–2	2–0	3–1	1–1	1–0	1–0
Eskişehirspor	2–1	0–0	0–0	3–1	2–2		2–1	2–0	1–0	1–0	1–0	0–1	1–0	0–0	6–0	0–1
Fenerbahçe	4–0	2–1	1–0	1–0	4–1	1–0		0–1	4–2	1–1	3–0	1–0	3–0	1–0	3–0	2–1
Galatasaray	1–0	1–0	0–0	3–1	2–1	3–1	1–1		2–0	0–1	2–0	3–0	3–0	5–0	1–0	3–1
Giresunspor	3–1	1–0	1–0	1–0	0–0	0–1	1–0	1–1		0–3	1–1	1–0	3–1	1–0	1–3	0–0
Göztepe	1–0	1–0	0–0	1–1	0–0	1–1	1–1	0–4	3–2		0–1	1–2	2–1	4–0	1–1	1–0
Mersin İdman Yurdu	0–1	2–2	1–0	0–0	0–0	1–2	0–0	0–0	1–0	2–0		0–0	1–1	3–1	4–2	1–0
MKE Ankaragücü	2–1	2–1	0–0	2–0	2–0	1–0	0–0	0–0	0–0	1–0	1–1		0–0	1–0	2–0	1–1
PTT	1–1	0–1	0–0	2–3	1–1	1–1	1–1	1–1	1–2	0–1	2–1	1–0		0–1	1–0	3–1
Samsunspor	0–0	2–0	2–0	1–0	0–0	0–0	1–2	1–1	0–0	0–4	1–0	2–2	1–1		1–0	1–0
Şekerspor	1–0	0–1	0–0	1–0	3–1	1–1	0–2	0–0	0–1	2–1	0–0	1–1	1–1	1–1		1–0
Vefa	1–1	0–0	0–1	1–1	1–1	1–1	1–1	1–2	0–0	2–0	1–0	0–1	1–0	3–2	2–0	

Source: TFF, Mackolik
Legend: Blue = home team win; Yellow = draw; Red = away team win.

== See also ==
- Doping in association football (Galatasaray's doping practice)
