= Đorđe Milić (footballer) =

Yugoslav and Serbian football manager and player

Personal information
- Date of birth: 27 October 1943 (age 83)
- Place of birth: Belgrade, German-occupied Serbia
- Position: Forward

Senior career*
| Years | Team | Apps | (Gls) |
| 1960–1966 | Vojvodina | 52 | (15) |
| 1966–1967 | Red Star Belgrade | 8 | (1) |
| 1967–1968 | Novi Sad | | |
| 1968–1969 | DOS | 5 | (0) |
| 1969–1970 | Novi Sad | 10 | (1) |
| 1970–1973 | Adanaspor | 75 | (25) |
| 1973–1975 | Beşiktaş | 44 | (7) |
| Total | | 194+ | (49+) |

International career
| 1964 | Yugoslavia | 1 | (0) |

Managerial career
- 1977–1978: Adanaspor
- 1980–1984: Beşiktaş
- 1984–1985: Bursaspor
- 1985–1986: Novi Sad
- 1986–1987: Šibenik
- 1989–1990: Adanaspor
- 1991: Bursaspor
- 1993: Bečej
- * Club domestic league appearances and goals

Đorđe Milić (Serbian Cyrillic: Ђорђе Милић; born 27 October 1943) is a former Yugoslav and Serbian football manager and player.

== Club career ==
Milić played for Vojvodina between 1960 and 1966. He recorded three appearances and scored one goal in the title-winning 1965–66 season. He then had a spell in the Eredivisie with DOS. Later on, Milić moved to Turkey, spending three seasons with Adanaspor and two seasons with Beşiktaş.

== International career ==
At international level, Milić was capped once for Yugoslavia in 1964.

== Managerial career ==
After hanging up his boots, Milić started his managerial career, taking charge of his former club Adanaspor in 1977. He later served as manager of Beşiktaş from 1980 to 1984, winning the championship in the 1981–82 season.

== Honours ==
=== Player ===
Vojvodina

- Yugoslav First League: 1965–66

Beşiktaş

- Turkish Cup: 1974–75
- Turkish Super Cup: 1974

=== Manager ===
Beşiktaş

- Turkish First Football League: 1981–82
