= 1971–72 1.Lig =

14th season of top-tier Turkish football

1.Lig
- Season: 1971–72
- Champions: Galatasaray (5th title)
- Relegated: İstanbulspor; Karşıyaka
- European Cup: Galatasaray
- Cup Winners' Cup: Ankaragücü
- UEFA Cup: Eskişehirspor; Fenerbahçe
- Matches: 240
- Goals: 464 (1.93 per match)
- Top goalscorer: Fethi Heper (20 goals)

Statistics of the Turkish First Football League for the 1971–72 season.

== Overview ==
It was contested by 16 teams, and Galatasaray S.K. won the championship.

== League table ==
Pos	Team	Pld	W	D	L	GF	GA	GD	Pts	Qualification or relegation
1	Galatasaray (C)	30	17	8	5	34	14	+20	42	Qualification to European Cup first round
2	Eskişehirspor	30	15	9	6	63	34	+29	39	Qualification to UEFA Cup first round
3	Fenerbahçe	30	14	11	5	37	21	+16	39	Qualification to UEFA Cup first round
4	Beşiktaş	30	12	10	8	28	23	+5	34	Invitation to Balkans Cup
5	MKE Ankaragücü	30	10	13	7	22	22	0	33	Qualification to Cup Winners' Cup first round
6	Bursaspor	30	12	8	10	29	24	+5	32	
7	Mersin İdmanyurdu	30	10	10	10	35	29	+6	30	
8	Adanaspor	30	9	12	9	28	26	+2	30	
9	Göztepe	30	10	9	11	32	32	0	29	
10	Vefa	30	9	10	11	23	27	−4	28	
11	Altay	30	9	9	12	29	40	−11	27	
12	Giresunspor	30	11	5	14	26	43	−17	27	
13	Samsunspor	30	5	15	10	14	21	−7	25	
14	Boluspor	30	8	8	14	23	33	−10	24	
15	İstanbulspor (R)	30	6	9	15	22	35	−13	21	Relegation to Turkish Second Football League
16	Karşıyaka (R)	30	5	10	15	19	40	−21	20	Relegation to Turkish Second Football League

Rules for classification: 1) points; 2) goal difference; 3) number of goals scored.
(C) Champions; (R) Relegated

== Results ==
Home \ Away	ADA	ALT	BJK	BOL	BUR	ESK	FNB	GAL	GRS	GÖZ	İST	KSK	MİY	AGÜ	SAM	VEF
Adanaspor		2–1	0–1	0–1	1–0	0–0	0–0	0–0	1–1	2–1	2–0	2–0	1–0	5–0	1–0	3–2
Altay	1–1		3–1	2–1	2–0	3–1	2–3	1–3	2–0	0–0	1–0	1–1	3–0	0–0	0–0	0–0
Beşiktaş	0–0	2–0		1–1	2–0	1–3	1–0	2–1	1–0	5–1	0–0	0–0	0–0	1–0	1–1	0–1
Boluspor	1–1	2–0	0–1		0–0	0–0	3–2	0–2	3–2	0–1	2–0	1–0	0–1	1–1	1–0	0–0
Bursaspor	1–0	3–0	0–0	3–1		3–1	1–0	0–0	1–0	0–1	2–1	2–0	1–0	0–0	2–0	2–1
Eskişehirspor	4–1	6–1	4–2	2–1	2–0		3–1	1–1	6–2	3–1	0–1	7–0	2–0	1–1	4–0	2–0
Fenerbahçe	2–0	3–1	0–0	1–0	2–2	2–0		2–1	2–0	2–0	3–1	2–0	1–1	1–0	1–0	2–0
Galatasaray	1–0	1–0	1–0	2–0	1–0	1–1	1–0		4–0	0–0	1–0	2–1	1–0	2–0	1–0	1–0
Giresunspor	2–0	1–0	0–0	2–0	1–1	1–2	0–0	1–0		1–0	2–1	1–0	2–1	2–1	1–0	2–1
Göztepe	1–1	0–1	1–2	2–0	0–1	4–2	1–1	1–0	5–1		2–0	1–3	4–2	1–1	0–0	0–0
İstanbulspor	1–1	2–2	0–0	1–2	1–0	1–1	0–0	0–2	3–0	0–1		0–0	1–0	1–1	2–2	0–2
Karşıyaka	0–0	1–1	1–0	1–1	2–1	1–1	1–2	2–3	1–0	0–0	0–2		2–1	0–2	0–0	0–0
Mersin İdman Yurdu	2–2	3–0	3–0	1–1	4–3	3–0	1–1	1–1	3–0	1–1	2–0	2–0		1–0	0–0	0–1
MKE Ankaragücü	1–0	3–0	1–0	1–0	0–0	1–1	0–0	1–0	1–0	1–0	2–1	1–0	0–0		1–1	1–1
Samsunspor	0–0	0–0	0–1	2–0	0–0	1–1	1–1	0–0	2–0	0–1	1–0	2–1	0–1	0–0		0–0
Vefa	2–1	0–1	1–3	1–0	1–0	0–2	0–0	0–0	1–1	2–1	1–2	2–1	1–1	2–0	0–1	

Source: TFF, Mackolik
Legend: Blue = home team win; Yellow = draw; Red = away team win.

== See also ==
- Doping in association football (Galatasaray's doping practice)
