= Güvenç Kurtar =

Turkish footballer and manager

Personal information
- Date of birth: 25 July 1950 (age 76)
- Place of birth: Uşak, Turkey
- Height: 1.79 m (5 ft 10 in)
- Position: Forward

Senior career*
Years	Team	Apps	(Gls)
1969–1971	Beşiktaş		
1971–1972	Mersin İY	24	(12)
1972–1974	Bursaspor	25	(3)
1974–1977	Altay		
1977–1982	Kocaelispor		
1982	Düzcespor		

Managerial career
- 1990–1991: Darıca Gençlerbirliği
- 1991–1994: Kocaelispor
- 1994: Sarıyer
- 1994–1995: Petrol Ofisi Spor
- 1996: Eskişehirspor
- 1996–1998: Zeytinburnuspor
- 1998–2000: Kocaelispor
- 2001–2002: Diyarbakırspor
- 2002–2003: Kocaelispor
- 2003–2004: Elazığspor
- 2005: Akçaabat Sebatspor
- 2006: Çaykur Rizespor
- 2007–2008: Denizlispor
- 2008: Bursaspor
- 2010: Diyarbakırspor
- 2010: Altay
- 2011: Denizlispor
- 2012: Adana Demirspor
- 2014: Ravan Baku
- 2015: Adanaspor
- 2017–2018: Beylerbeyi
- 2018: Gümüşhanespor
- * Club domestic league appearances and goals

Güvenç Kurtar (born 25 July 1950) is a Turkish football manager and former player who most recently worked as head coach for Gümüşhanespor.

== Playing career ==
Kurtar was born in Uşak. A forward, he began playing football with Beşiktaş J.K. He played at Mersin Idman Yurdu, Bursaspor, Altay S.K. and Kocaelispor before retirement.

== Coaching career ==
On 5 March 2010, Diyarbakirspor hired the coach to replace Ziya Doğan until the end of the season.

On 3 January 2014, Kurtar was appointed manager of Ravan Baku in the Azerbaijan Premier League.

== Managerial statistics ==
As of 15 April 2014

Name	Managerial Tenure	P	W	D	L	Win %
(Azerbaijan) Ravan Baku	3 January 2014 –	14	2	3	9	14.29
