= List of populated places in Manisa Province =

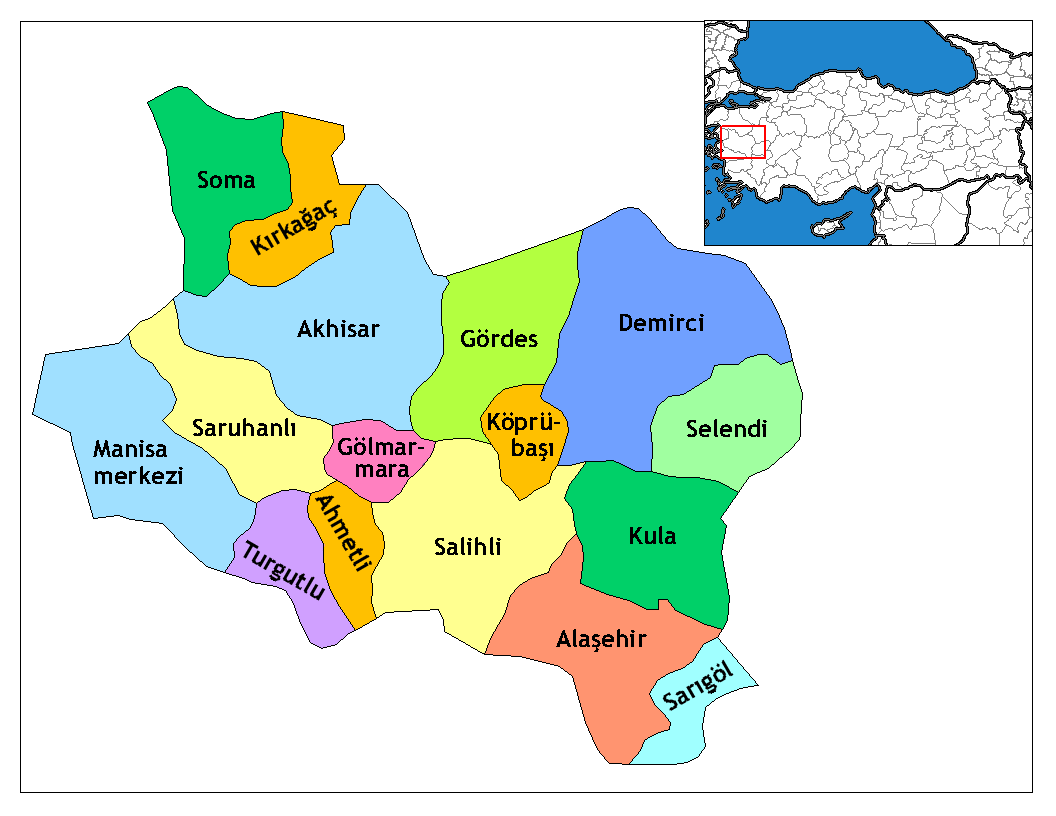
Manisa Province

Below is the list of populated places in Manisa Province, Turkey by district. In the following lists first place in each list is the administrative center of the district.

== Manisa ==
- Manisa
- Akçaköy, Manisa
- Akgedik, Manisa
- Asmacık, Manisa
- Aşağıçobanisa, Manisa
- Avdal, Manisa
- Ayvacık, Manisa
- Bağyolu, Manisa
- Belenyenice, Manisa
- Beydere, Manisa
- Bostanlar, Manisa
- Büyüksümbüller, Manisa
- Çamköy, Manisa
- Çamlıca, Manisa
- Çavuşoğlu, Manisa
- Çınarlıkuyu, Manisa
- Davutlar, Manisa
- Dazyurt, Manisa
- Demirci, Manisa
- Durasıllı, Manisa
- Düzlen, Manisa
- Emlakdere, Manisa
- Evrenos, Manisa
- Gökbel, Manisa
- Gökçeler, Manisa
- Gülbahçe, Manisa
- Gürle, Manisa
- Güzelköy, Manisa
- Hacıhaliller, Manisa
- Halıtlı, Manisa
- Hamzabeyli, Manisa
- İlyasçılar, Manisa
- Kağan, Manisa
- Kaleköy, Manisa
- Kalemli, Manisa
- Karaağaçlı, Manisa
- Karaahmetli, Manisa
- Karaali, Manisa
- Karahüseyinli, Manisa
- Karakılıçlı, Manisa
- Karakoca, Manisa
- Karaoğlanlı, Manisa
- Karaveliler, Manisa
- Karayağcıhacılar, Manisa
- Karayenice, Manisa
- Kayapınar, Manisa
- Kırançiftliği, Manisa
- Kışlaköy, Manisa
- Kocakoru, Manisa
- Koruköy, Manisa
- Kozaklar, Manisa
- Küçükbelen, Manisa
- Küçüksümbüller, Manisa
- Maldan, Manisa
- Manisa, Manisa
- Mollasüleymanlı, Manisa
- Muradiye, Manisa
- Müslih, Manisa
- Ortaköy, Manisa
- Osmancalı, Manisa
- Otmanlar, Manisa
- Örencik, Manisa
- Örselli, Manisa
- Pelitalan, Manisa
- Pınarköy, Manisa
- Recepli, Manisa
- Sakallı, Manisa
- Sancaklıbozköy, Manisa
- Sancaklıçeşmebaşı, Manisa
- Sancaklıiğdecik, Manisa
- Sancaklıkayadibi, Manisa
- Sancaklıuzunçınar, Manisa
- Sarıahmetli, Manisa
- Sarıalan, Manisa
- Sarınasuhlar, Manisa
- Sarma, Manisa
- Selimşahlar, Manisa
- Siyekli, Manisa
- Sümbültepe, Manisa
- Süngüllü, Manisa
- Şamar, Manisa
- Tekeliler, Manisa
- Tepecik, Manisa
- Tilkisüleymaniye, Manisa
- Turgutalp, Manisa
- Türkmen, Manisa
- Uzunburun, Manisa
- Uzunlar, Manisa
- Üçpınar, Manisa
- Veziroğlu, Manisa
- Yağcılar, Manisa
- Yaylaköy, Manisa
- Yeniharmandalı, Manisa
- Yeniköy, Manisa
- Yenimahmudiye, Manisa
- Yeşilköy, Manisa
- Yukarıçobanisa, Manisa
- Yuntdağıköseler, Manisa
- Yuntdağyenice, Manisa

== Ahmetli ==
- Ahmetli
- Alahıdır, Ahmetli
- Ataköy, Ahmetli
- Bahçecik, Ahmetli
- Cambazlı, Ahmetli
- Dereköy, Ahmetli
- Derici, Ahmetli
- Dibekdere, Ahmetli
- Gökkaya, Ahmetli
- Hacıköseli, Ahmetli
- Halilkahya, Ahmetli
- Karaköy, Ahmetli
- Kargın, Ahmetli
- Kendirlik, Ahmetli
- Kestelli, Ahmetli
- Mandallı, Ahmetli
- Seydiköy, Ahmetli
- Yaraşlı, Ahmetli

== Akhisar ==
- Akhisar
- Zeytinliova, Akhisar
- Akçaalan, Akhisar
- Akçeşme, Akhisar
- Akkocalı, Akhisar
- Akselendi, Akhisar
- Arabacıbozköy, Akhisar
- Aşağıdolma, Akhisar
- Ballıca, Akhisar
- Başlamış, Akhisar
- Bekirler, Akhisar
- Beyoba, Akhisar
- Boyalılar, Akhisar
- Büknüş, Akhisar
- Bünyanosmaniye, Akhisar
- Çamönü, Akhisar
- Çanakçı, Akhisar
- Çıtak, Akhisar
- Çobanhasan, Akhisar
- Çoruk, Akhisar
- Dağdere, Akhisar
- Dayıoğlu, Akhisar
- Dereköy, Akhisar
- Dingiller, Akhisar
- Doğankaya, Akhisar
- Doğuca, Akhisar
- Dolmadeğirmen, Akhisar
- Durasıl, Akhisar
- Erdelli, Akhisar
- Eroğlu, Akhisar
- Evkafteke, Akhisar
- Göcek, Akhisar
- Gökçeahmet, Akhisar
- Gökçeler, Akhisar
- Hacıibrahimler, Akhisar
- Hacıosmanlar, Akhisar
- Hamidiye, Akhisar
- Hamitköy, Akhisar
- Hanpaşa, Akhisar
- Harmandalı, Akhisar
- Hasköy, Akhisar
- Işıkköy, Akhisar
- İsaca, Akhisar
- Kabaağaçkıran, Akhisar
- Kadıdağı, Akhisar
- Kapaklı, Akhisar
- Karabörklü, Akhisar
- Karaköy, Akhisar
- Karayağcı, Akhisar
- Kavakalan, Akhisar
- Kayalıoğlu, Akhisar
- Kayganlı, Akhisar
- Kızlaralanı, Akhisar
- Kobaşdere, Akhisar
- Kocakağan, Akhisar
- Kömürcü, Akhisar
- Kulaksızlar, Akhisar
- Kurtulmuş, Akhisar
- Mecidiye, Akhisar
- Medar, Akhisar
- Moralılar, Akhisar
- Musaca, Akhisar
- Musalar, Akhisar
- Muştullar, Akhisar
- Pekmezci, Akhisar
- Pınarcık, Akhisar
- Rahmiye, Akhisar
- Sabancılar, Akhisar
- Sağrakçı, Akhisar
- Sakarkaya, Akhisar
- Sarıçalı, Akhisar
- Sarılar, Akhisar
- Sarnıçköy, Akhisar
- Sazoba, Akhisar
- Seğirdim, Akhisar
- Selçikli, Akhisar
- Selvili, Akhisar
- Sırtköy, Akhisar
- Sindelli, Akhisar
- Söğütlü, Akhisar
- Süleymanköy, Akhisar
- Süleymanlı, Akhisar
- Sünnetçiler, Akhisar
- Şehitler, Akhisar
- Taşçılar, Akhisar
- Topluca, Akhisar
- Tütenli, Akhisar
- Ulupınar, Akhisar
- Üçavlu, Akhisar
- Yatağan, Akhisar
- Yayakırıldık, Akhisar
- Yaykın, Akhisar
- Yeğenoba, Akhisar
- Yenice, Akhisar
- Yenidoğan, Akhisar
- Zeytinlibağ, Akhisar

== Alaşehir ==
- Alaşehir
- Akkeçili, Alaşehir
- Alhan, Alaşehir
- Aydoğdu, Alaşehir
- Azıtepe, Alaşehir
- Badınca, Alaşehir
- Bahadır, Alaşehir
- Bahçedere, Alaşehir
- Bahçeliköy, Alaşehir
- Baklacı, Alaşehir
- Belenyaka, Alaşehir
- Caberburhan, Alaşehir
- Caberfakılı, Alaşehir
- Caberkamara, Alaşehir
- Çağlayan, Alaşehir
- Çakırcaali, Alaşehir
- Çamlıbel, Alaşehir
- Çarıkbozdağ, Alaşehir
- Çarıkkaralar, Alaşehir
- Çeşneli, Alaşehir
- Dağarlar, Alaşehir
- Dağhacıyusuf, Alaşehir
- Delemenler, Alaşehir
- Erenköy, Alaşehir
- Evrenli, Alaşehir
- Girelli, Alaşehir
- Göbekli, Alaşehir
- Gülenyaka, Alaşehir
- Gülpınar, Alaşehir
- Gümüşçay, Alaşehir
- Gürsu, Alaşehir
- Hacıaliler, Alaşehir
- Horzumalayaka, Alaşehir
- Horzumembelli, Alaşehir
- Horzumkeserler, Alaşehir
- Horzumsazdere, Alaşehir
- Ilgın, Alaşehir
- Işıklar, Alaşehir
- İsmailbey, Alaşehir
- İsmetiye, Alaşehir
- Karacalar, Alaşehir
- Karadağ, Alaşehir
- Kasaplı, Alaşehir
- Kavaklıdere, Alaşehir
- Kemaliye, Alaşehir
- Kestanederesi, Alaşehir
- Killik, Alaşehir
- Kozluca, Alaşehir
- Kurudere, Alaşehir
- Matarlı, Alaşehir
- Narlıdere, Alaşehir
- Osmaniye, Alaşehir
- Örencik, Alaşehir
- Örnekköy, Alaşehir
- Piyadeler, Alaşehir
- Sarıpınar, Alaşehir
- Selce, Alaşehir
- Serinköy, Alaşehir
- Serinyayla, Alaşehir
- Sobran, Alaşehir
- Soğanlı, Alaşehir
- Soğukyurt, Alaşehir
- Subaşı, Alaşehir
- Şahyar, Alaşehir
- Tepeköy, Alaşehir
- Toygar, Alaşehir
- Türkmen, Alaşehir
- Uluderbent, Alaşehir
- Üzümlü, Alaşehir
- Yeniköy, Alaşehir
- Yeşilyurt, Alaşehir
- Yuvacalı, Alaşehir

== Demirci ==
- Demirci
- Ahatlar, Demirci
- Ahmetler, Demirci
- Akdere, Demirci
- Alaağaç, Demirci
- Armağan, Demirci
- Armutlu, Demirci
- Ayvaalan, Demirci
- Azizbey, Demirci
- Bardakçı, Demirci
- Bayramşah, Demirci
- Borlu, Demirci
- Boyacık, Demirci
- Bozçatlı, Demirci
- Bozköy, Demirci
- Büyükkıran, Demirci
- Çağıllar, Demirci
- Çamköy, Demirci
- Çanakçı, Demirci
- Çandır, Demirci
- Çardaklı, Demirci
- Çataloluk, Demirci
- Çayköy, Demirci
- Danişmentler, Demirci
- Demirci, Demirci
- Durhasan, Demirci
- Elek, Demirci
- Esenyurt, Demirci
- Eskihisar, Demirci
- Gökveliler, Demirci
- Gömeçler, Demirci
- Gülpınar, Demirci
- Gümele, Demirci
- Gürçeşme, Demirci
- Güveli, Demirci
- Hırkalı, Demirci
- Hoşçalar, Demirci
- Hüdük, Demirci
- Iklıkçı, Demirci
- İcikler, Demirci
- İmceler, Demirci
- İmrenler, Demirci
- İrişler, Demirci
- İsmailler, Demirci
- Karaisalar, Demirci
- Kargınışıklar, Demirci
- Karyağdı, Demirci
- Kayaköy, Demirci
- Kayranokçular, Demirci
- Kazancı, Demirci
- Kerpiçlik, Demirci
- Kılavuzlar, Demirci
- Kışlak, Demirci
- Kovancı, Demirci
- Köylüce, Demirci
- Kulalar, Demirci
- Kulalı, Demirci
- Kuzeyir, Demirci
- Kuzuköy, Demirci
- Küçükkıran, Demirci
- Küçükoba, Demirci
- Küpeler, Demirci
- Mahmutlar, Demirci
- Marmaracık, Demirci
- Mezitler, Demirci
- Minnetler, Demirci
- Öksüzlü, Demirci
- Ören, Demirci
- Örücüler, Demirci
- Rahmanlar, Demirci
- Sağnıç, Demirci
- Saraycık, Demirci
- Sayık, Demirci
- Selviler, Demirci
- Serçeler, Demirci
- Sevişler, Demirci
- Söğütçük, Demirci
- Talas, Demirci
- Taşokçular, Demirci
- Tekeler, Demirci
- Teperik, Demirci
- Tokmaklı, Demirci
- Ulacık, Demirci
- Üşümüş, Demirci
- Yabacı, Demirci
- Yarbasan, Demirci
- Yavaşlar, Demirci
- Yenice, Demirci
- Yeşildere, Demirci
- Yeşiloba, Demirci
- Yiğenler, Demirci
- Yiğitler, Demirci
- Yumuklar, Demirci

== Gölmarmara ==
- Gölmarmara
- Ayanlar, Gölmarmara
- Beyler, Gölmarmara
- Çamköy, Gölmarmara
- Çömlekçi, Gölmarmara
- Deynekler, Gölmarmara
- Hacıbaştanlar, Gölmarmara
- Hacıveliler, Gölmarmara
- Hıroğlu, Gölmarmara
- Kayaaltı, Gölmarmara
- Kılcanlar, Gölmarmara
- Ozanca, Gölmarmara
- Taşkuyucak, Gölmarmara
- Tiyenli, Gölmarmara
- Yeniköy, Gölmarmara
- Yunuslar, Gölmarmara

== Gördes ==
- Gördes
- Akpınar, Gördes
- Balıklı, Gördes
- Bayat, Gördes
- Beğel, Gördes
- Beğenler, Gördes
- Benlieli, Gördes
- Boyalı, Gördes
- Börez, Gördes
- Çağlayan, Gördes
- Çatalarmut, Gördes
- Çiçekli, Gördes
- Çiğiller, Gördes
- Dalkara, Gördes
- Dargıl, Gördes
- Deliçoban, Gördes
- Dereçiftlik, Gördes
- Dikilitaş, Gördes
- Doğanpınar, Gördes
- Dutluca, Gördes
- Efendili, Gördes
- Fundacık, Gördes
- Gülpınar, Gördes
- Güneşli, Gördes
- Kabakoz, Gördes
- Kalemoğlu, Gördes
- Karaağaç, Gördes
- Karakeçili, Gördes
- Karayağcı, Gördes
- Karayakup, Gördes
- Kaşıkçı, Gördes
- Kayacık, Gördes
- Kılcanlar, Gördes
- Kıran, Gördes
- Kıymık, Gördes
- Kızıldam, Gördes
- Kobaklar, Gördes
- Korubaşı, Gördes
- Köseler, Gördes
- Kuşluk, Gördes
- Kuyucakkarapınar, Gördes
- Kürekçi, Gördes
- Malaz, Gördes
- Malkoca, Gördes
- Merkez Tepe, Gördes
- Oğulduruk, Gördes
- Pınarbaşı, Gördes
- Salur, Gördes
- Sarıaliler, Gördes
- Şahinkaya, Gördes
- Şeyhyayla, Gördes
- Tüpüler, Gördes
- Ulgar, Gördes
- Yakaköy, Gördes
- Yeniköy, Gördes
- Yeşilyurt, Gördes

== Kırkağaç ==
- Kırkağaç
- Alacalar, Kırkağaç
- Alifakı, Kırkağaç
- Bademli, Kırkağaç
- Bakır, Kırkağaç
- Bostancı, Kırkağaç
- Çaltıcak, Kırkağaç
- Çiftlik, Kırkağaç
- Çobanlar, Kırkağaç
- Demirtaş, Kırkağaç
- Dualar, Kırkağaç
- Fırdanlar, Kırkağaç
- Gebeler, Kırkağaç
- Gelenbe, Kırkağaç
- Gökçukur, Kırkağaç
- Güvendik, Kırkağaç
- Hacet, Kırkağaç
- Halkahavlu, Kırkağaç
- Hamidiye, Kırkağaç
- Hamitli, Kırkağaç
- Işıklar, Kırkağaç
- İlyaslar, Kırkağaç
- Karakurt, Kırkağaç
- Kınık, Kırkağaç
- Kocaiskan, Kırkağaç
- Kuyucak, Kırkağaç
- Küçükyaya, Kırkağaç
- Musahoca, Kırkağaç
- Öğeçli, Kırkağaç
- Sakarlı, Kırkağaç
- Siledik, Kırkağaç
- Söğütalan, Kırkağaç
- Yağmurlu, Kırkağaç

== Köprübaşı ==
- Köprübaşı
- Akçaalan, Köprübaşı
- Alanyolu, Köprübaşı
- Arpacı, Köprübaşı
- Azimli, Köprübaşı
- Bozburun, Köprübaşı
- Cıcıklı, Köprübaşı
- Çarıklar, Köprübaşı
- Çavullar, Köprübaşı
- Döğüşören, Köprübaşı
- Esat, Köprübaşı
- Gölbaşı, Köprübaşı
- Gündoğdu, Köprübaşı
- İkizkuyu, Köprübaşı
- Karaelmacık, Köprübaşı
- Kasar, Köprübaşı
- Kavakyeri, Köprübaşı
- Kemhallı, Köprübaşı
- Kıdırcık, Köprübaşı
- Kınık, Köprübaşı
- Kıranşeyh, Köprübaşı
- Killik, Köprübaşı
- Kozaklı, Köprübaşı
- Kurtlar, Köprübaşı
- Mestanlı, Köprübaşı
- Rağıllar, Köprübaşı
- Sargaç, Köprübaşı
- Uğurlu, Köprübaşı
- Yardere, Köprübaşı
- Yeşilköy, Köprübaşı

== Kula ==
- Kula
- Ahmetli, Kula
- Aktaş, Kula
- Ayazören, Kula
- Ayvatlar, Kula
- Balıbey, Kula
- Başıbüyük, Kula
- Battalmustafa, Kula
- Bayramşah, Kula
- Bebekli, Kula
- Börtlüce, Kula
- Çarıkballı, Kula
- Çarıkmahmutlu, Kula
- Çarıktekke, Kula
- Çiftçiibrahim, Kula
- Dereköy, Kula
- Emre, Kula
- Encekler, Kula
- Erenbağı, Kula
- Eroğlu, Kula
- Esenyazı, Kula
- Evciler, Kula
- Gökçeören, Kula
- Gökdere, Kula
- Gölbaşı, Kula
- Güvercinlik, Kula
- Hacıtufan, Kula
- Hamidiye, Kula
- Hayalli, Kula
- İbrahimağa, Kula
- İncesu, Kula
- Kalınharman, Kula
- Karaoba, Kula
- Kavacık, Kula
- Kenger, Kula
- Konurca, Kula
- Körez, Kula
- Narıncalıpıtrak, Kula
- Narıncalısüleyman, Kula
- Ortaköy, Kula
- Papuçlu, Kula
- Sandal, Kula
- Saraçlar, Kula
- Sarnıç, Kula
- Söğütdere, Kula
- Şehitlioğlu, Kula
- Şeremet, Kula
- Şeritli, Kula
- Şıhlı, Kula
- Tatlıçeşme, Kula
- Topuzdamları, Kula
- Yağbastı, Kula
- Yeniköy, Kula
- Yeşilyayla, Kula
- Yurtbaşı, Kula

== Salihli ==
- Salihli
- Adala, Salihli
- Akçaköy, Salihli
- Akören, Salihli
- Akyar, Salihli
- Allahdiyen, Salihli
- Bağcılar, Salihli
- Bahçecik, Salihli
- Başlıoğlu, Salihli
- Bektaşlar, Salihli
- Beylikli, Salihli
- Burhan, Salihli
- Caferbey, Salihli
- Çakaldoğanlar, Salihli
- Çaltılı, Salihli
- Çamurhamamı, Salihli
- Çapaklı, Salihli
- Çavlu, Salihli
- Çayköy, Salihli
- Çaypınar, Salihli
- Çelikli, Salihli
- Çökelek, Salihli
- Çukuroba, Salihli
- Damatlı, Salihli
- Delibaşlı, Salihli
- Derbent, Salihli
- Dombaylı, Salihli
- Durasıllı, Salihli
- Eldelek, Salihli
- Eminbey, Salihli
- Emirhacılı, Salihli
- Gökeyüp, Salihli
- Gökköy, Salihli
- Hacıbektaşlı, Salihli
- Hacıhıdır, Salihli
- Hacıköseli, Salihli
- Hacılı, Salihli
- Hasalan, Salihli
- İğdecik, Salihli
- Kabazlı, Salihli
- Kale, Salihli
- Kapancı, Salihli
- Kaplan, Salihli
- Karaağaç, Salihli
- Karaoğlanlı, Salihli
- Karapınar, Salihli
- Karasavcı, Salihli
- Karayahşi, Salihli
- Kemer, Salihli
- Kemerdamları, Salihli
- Kırdamları, Salihli
- Kızılhavlu, Salihli
- Kordon, Salihli
- Köseali, Salihli
- Kurttutan, Salihli
- Mamatlı, Salihli
- Mersindere, Salihli
- Mersinli, Salihli
- Mevlutlu, Salihli
- Oraklar, Salihli
- Ortaköy, Salihli
- Pazarköy, Salihli
- Poyraz, Salihli
- Poyrazdamları, Salihli
- Sart, Salihli
- Sindel, Salihli
- Süleymaniye, Salihli
- Şirinyer, Salihli
- Taytan, Salihli
- Tekelioğlu, Salihli
- Torunlu, Salihli
- Üçtepe, Salihli
- Yağbasan, Salihli
- Yağmurlar, Salihli
- Yeniköy, Salihli
- Yenipazar, Salihli
- Yeşilkavak, Salihli
- Yeşilova, Salihli
- Yılmaz, Salihli

== Sarıgöl ==
- Sarıgöl
- Afşar, Sarıgöl
- Ahmetağa, Sarıgöl
- Alemşahlı, Sarıgöl
- Bağlıca, Sarıgöl
- Bahadırlar, Sarıgöl
- Baharlar, Sarıgöl
- Bereketli, Sarıgöl
- Beyharmanı, Sarıgöl
- Çanakçı, Sarıgöl
- Çavuşlar, Sarıgöl
- Çimentepe, Sarıgöl
- Dadağlı, Sarıgöl
- Dindarlı, Sarıgöl
- Doğuşlar, Sarıgöl
- Emcelli, Sarıgöl
- Güneydamları, Sarıgöl
- Günyaka, Sarıgöl
- Kahramanlar, Sarıgöl
- Karacaali, Sarıgöl
- Kızılçukur, Sarıgöl
- Özpınar, Sarıgöl
- Selimiye, Sarıgöl
- Sığırtmaçlı, Sarıgöl
- Şeyhdavutlar, Sarıgöl
- Tırazlar, Sarıgöl
- Yeniköy, Sarıgöl
- Yeşiltepe, Sarıgöl
- Yukarıkoçaklar, Sarıgöl
- Ziyanlar, Sarıgöl

== Saruhanlı ==
- Saruhanlı
- Adiloba, Saruhanlı
- Alibeyli, Saruhanlı
- Apak, Saruhanlı
- Aydınlar, Saruhanlı
- Azimli, Saruhanlı
- Bahadır, Saruhanlı
- Bedeller, Saruhanlı
- Büyükbelen, Saruhanlı
- Çakmaklı, Saruhanlı
- Çaltepe, Saruhanlı
- Çamlıyurt, Saruhanlı
- Çınaroba, Saruhanlı
- Çullugörece, Saruhanlı
- Develi, Saruhanlı
- Dilek, Saruhanlı
- Gökçe, Saruhanlı
- Gözlet, Saruhanlı
- Gümülceli, Saruhanlı
- Hacımusa, Saruhanlı
- Hacırahmanlı, Saruhanlı
- Halitpaşa, Saruhanlı
- Hatıplar, Saruhanlı
- Heybeli, Saruhanlı
- İshakçelebi, Saruhanlı
- Kayışlar, Saruhanlı
- Kemiklidere, Saruhanlı
- Kepenekli, Saruhanlı
- Koldere, Saruhanlı
- Koyuncu, Saruhanlı
- Kumkuyucak, Saruhanlı
- Lütfiye, Saruhanlı
- Mütevelli, Saruhanlı
- Nuriye, Saruhanlı
- Paşaköy, Saruhanlı
- Pınarbaşı, Saruhanlı
- Sarıçam, Saruhanlı
- Sarısığırlı, Saruhanlı
- Seyitoba, Saruhanlı
- Şatırlar, Saruhanlı
- Taşdibi, Saruhanlı
- Tirkeş, Saruhanlı
- Yeniosmaniye, Saruhanlı

== Selendi ==
- Selendi
- Akçakertil, Selendi
- Altınköy, Selendi
- Aşağıgüllüce, Selendi
- Avlaşa, Selendi
- Beypınar, Selendi
- Çalıklı, Selendi
- Çamköy, Selendi
- Çamlıca, Selendi
- Çampınar, Selendi
- Çamyayla, Selendi
- Çanşa, Selendi
- Çıkrıkçı, Selendi
- Çinan, Selendi
- Çortak, Selendi
- Dedeler, Selendi
- Dumanlar, Selendi
- Eskin, Selendi
- Gölbaşı, Selendi
- Hacılar, Selendi
- Halılar, Selendi
- Havaoğlu, Selendi
- Kabaklar, Selendi
- Karabeyler, Selendi
- Karakozan, Selendi
- Karaselendi, Selendi
- Karataşterziler, Selendi
- Kayranlar, Selendi
- Kazıklı, Selendi
- Kınık, Selendi
- Kurşunlu, Selendi
- Kürkçü, Selendi
- Mıdıklı, Selendi
- Mollaahmetler, Selendi
- Omurlar, Selendi
- Pınarlar, Selendi
- Rahmanlar, Selendi
- Satılmış, Selendi
- Selmanhacılar, Selendi
- Şehirlioğlu, Selendi
- Tavak, Selendi
- Tepeynihan, Selendi
- Turpçu, Selendi
- Yağcı, Selendi
- Yenice, Selendi
- Yukarıgüllüce, Selendi
- Zıramanlar, Selendi

== Soma ==
- Soma
- Avdan, Soma
- Adil, Soma
- Akçaavlu, Soma
- Bayat, Soma
- Beyce, Soma
- Boncuklu, Soma
- Bozarmut, Soma
- Büyük Güney, Soma
- Büyük Işıklar, Soma
- Cenkyeri, Soma
- Çatalçam, Soma
- Çavdır, Soma
- Çevircek, Soma
- Darkale, Soma
- Deniş, Soma
- Dereköy, Soma
- Devlethan, Soma
- Dualar, Soma
- Duğla, Soma
- Eğnez, Soma
- Evciler, Soma
- Göktaş, Soma
- Hacıyusuf, Soma
- Hamidiye, Soma
- Hatun, Soma
- Heciz, Soma
- Kaplan, Soma
- Karacahisar, Soma
- Karacakaş, Soma
- Karaçam, Soma
- Kayrakaltı, Soma
- Kızılören, Soma
- Kiraz, Soma
- Kobaklar, Soma
- Koyundere, Soma
- Kozanlı, Soma
- Kozluören, Soma
- Kum, Soma
- Küçük Güney, Soma
- Menteşe, Soma
- Naldöken, Soma
- Pirahmet, Soma
- Sarıkaya, Soma
- Sevişler, Soma
- Söğütçük, Soma
- Sultaniye, Soma
- Tabanlar, Soma
- Tekeli Işıklar, Soma
- Turgutalp, Soma
- Türkali, Soma
- Türkpiyala, Soma
- Ularca, Soma
- Uruzlar, Soma
- Vakıflı, Soma
- Yağcılı, Soma
- Yayladalı, Soma
- Yırca, Soma

== Turgutlu ==
- Turgutlu
- Akçapınar, Turgutlu
- Akköy, Turgutlu
- Aşağıbozkır, Turgutlu
- Avşar, Turgutlu
- Ayvacık, Turgutlu
- Baktırlı, Turgutlu
- Bozkır, Turgutlu
- Çampınar, Turgutlu
- Çatalköprü, Turgutlu
- Çepnibektaş, Turgutlu
- Çepnidere, Turgutlu
- Çıkrıkçı, Turgutlu
- Dağyeniköy, Turgutlu
- Dalbahçe, Turgutlu
- Derbent, Turgutlu
- Gökgedik, Turgutlu
- Güney, Turgutlu
- Hacıisalar, Turgutlu
- Irlamaz, Turgutlu
- İzzettin, Turgutlu
- Kabaçınar, Turgutlu
- Karaköy, Turgutlu
- Karaoluk, Turgutlu
- Kayrak, Turgutlu
- Kurudere, Turgutlu
- Kuşlar, Turgutlu
- Musacalı, Turgutlu
- Musalaryeniköy, Turgutlu
- Osmancık, Turgutlu
- Ören, Turgutlu
- Sarıbey, Turgutlu
- Sinirli, Turgutlu
- Sivrice, Turgutlu
- Temrek, Turgutlu
- Urganlı, Turgutlu
- Yakuplar, Turgutlu
- Yaykın, Turgutlu
- Yeniköy, Turgutlu
- Yunusdere, Turgutlu

== Recent development ==
According to Law act no 6360, all Turkish provinces with a population more than 750 000, were renamed as metropolitan municipality. Furthermore, the central district will be split into two and two new districts are established; Yunusemre and Şehzadeler. All districts in those provinces became second level municipalities and all villages in those districts were renamed as a neighborhoods . Thus the villages listed above are officially neighborhoods of Manisa.
