= List of municipalities in Manisa Province =

This is a list of municipalities in Manisa Province, Turkey as of November 2025.

== Municipalities ==
Mayors of Manisa Province
Municipality	Mayor	Party	Source
Metropolitan Municipality	Besim Dutlulu	CHP	
Ahmetli	Fuat Mintaş	CHP	
Akhisar	Ekrem Kayserili	CHP	
Alaşehir	Ahmet Öküzcüoğlu	CHP	
Demirci	Erkan Kara	AKP	
Gölmarmara	Cem Aykan	CHP	
Gördes	İbrahim Büke	CHP	
Kırkağaç	Üstün Dönmez	CHP	
Köprübaşı	Fatih Taşlı	CHP	
Kula	Hikmet Dönmez	CHP	
Salihli	Mazlum Nurlu	CHP	
Sarıgöl	Tahsin Akdeniz	CHP	
Saruhanlı	Ekrem Cıllı	AKP	
Selendi	Murat Daban	AKP	
Soma	Sercan Okur	CHP	
Şehzadeler	Gülşah Durbay	CHP	
Turgutlu	Çetin Akın	CHP	
Yunusemre	Musa Semih Balaban	CHP	

== Changes in 2014 ==
According to Law act no 6360, belde (town) municipalities within provinces with more than 750000 population (so called Metropolitan municipalities in Turkey) were abolished as of 30 March 2014. 68 belde municipalities in the above list are now defunct. The list is kept for historical reference.
