= 1965 Turkish census =

The 1965 Turkish census was held on October 24, 1965, and recorded the population and demographic details of every settlement in Turkey. The 1965 census was the last census with information languages and ethnicities as afterwards, the Turkish Government prohibited their publication.

Census in Turkey
Year	Pop.	±%
1927	13,649,945	—
1935	16,188,767	+18.6%
1940	17,820,950	+10.1%
1945	18,790,174	+5.4%
1950	20,947,188	+11.5%
1955	24,064,763	+14.9%
1960	27,754,820	+15.3%
1965	31,391,421	+13.1%
1970	35,605,176	+13.4%
1975	40,347,719	+13.3%
1980	44,736,957	+10.9%
1985	50,664,458	+13.2%
1990	56,473,035	+11.5%
2000	67,803,927	+20.1%
2007	70,586,256	+4.1%
2008	71,517,100	+1.3%
2009	72,561,312	+1.5%
2010	73,722,988	+1.6%
2011	74,724,269	+1.4%
2012	75,627,384	+1.2%
2013	76,667,864	+1.4%
2014	77,695,904	+1.3%
2015	78,741,053	+1.3%
2016	79,814,871	+1.4%
2017	80,810,525	+1.2%
2018	82,003,882	+1.5%
2019	83,154,997	+1.4%
2020	83,614,362	+0.6%
2021	84,680,273	+1.3%
2022	85,279,553	+0.7%

== Population by district ==
	total population	no	rate	urban	%	rural	%	man	%	woman	%
Turkey	31,391,421			10,805,817	34,42%	20,585,604	65,58%	15,996,964	50,96%	15,394,457	49,04%
Adana	902,712	5	2,88%	422,298	46,78%	480,414	53,22%	466,032	51,63%	436,680	48,37%
Adıyaman	267,288	47	0,85%	51,463	19,25%	215,825	80,75%	136,615	51,11%	130,673	48,89%
Afyonkarahisar	502,248	21	1,60%	125,102	24,91%	377,146	75,09%	250,478	49,87%	251,770	50,13%
Ağrı	246,961	56	0,79%	53,420	21,63%	193,541	78,37%	130,396	52,80%	116,565	47,20%
Amasya	285,729	45	0,91%	83,016	29,05%	202,713	70,95%	148,016	51,80%	137,713	48,20%
Ankara	1,644,302	2	5,24%	1,069,761	65,06%	574,541	34,94%	872,680	53,07%	771,622	46,93%
Antalya	486,910	23	1,55%	129,657	26,63%	357,253	73,37%	244,939	50,30%	241,971	49,70%
Artvin	210,065	57	0,67%	30,068	14,31%	179,997	85,69%	102,630	48,86%	107,435	51,14%
Aydın	524,918	17	1,67%	165,953	31,62%	358,965	68,38%	262,021	49,92%	262,897	50,08%
Balıkesir	708,342	9	2,26%	230,353	32,52%	477,989	67,48%	365,959	51,66%	342,383	48,34%
Bilecik	139,041	66	0,44%	36,356	26,15%	102,685	73,85%	68,900	49,55%	70,141	50,45%
Bingöl	150,521	65	0,48%	20,401	13,55%	130,120	86,45%	77,758	51,66%	72,763	48,34%
Bitlis	154,069	64	0,49%	43,813	28,44%	110,256	71,56%	80,996	52,57%	73,073	47,43%
Bolu	383,939	37	1,22%	70,459	18,35%	313,480	81,65%	189,663	49,40%	194,276	50,60%
Burdur	194,950	61	0,62%	54,135	27,77%	140,815	72,23%	98,137	50,34%	96,813	49,66%
Bursa	755,504	7	2,41%	335,048	44,35%	420,456	55,65%	379,055	50,17%	376,449	49,83%
Çanakkale	350,317	39	1,12%	81,753	23,34%	268,564	76,66%	182,806	52,18%	167,511	47,82%
Çankırı	250,706	55	0,80%	43,731	17,44%	206,975	82,56%	120,131	47,92%	130,575	52,08%
Çorum	485,567	24	1,55%	97,032	19,98%	388,535	80,02%	240,576	49,55%	244,991	50,45%
Denizli	463,369	26	1,48%	117,739	25,41%	345,630	74,59%	230,468	49,74%	232,901	50,26%
Diyarbakır	475,916	25	1,52%	162,467	34,14%	313,449	65,86%	249,874	52,50%	226,042	47,50%
Edirne	303,234	43	0,97%	102,171	33,69%	201,063	66,31%	157,377	51,90%	145,857	48,10%
Elazığ	322,727	42	1,03%	106,180	32,90%	216,547	67,10%	165,636	51,32%	157,091	48,68%
Erzincan	258,586	53	0,82%	57,397	22,20%	201,189	77,80%	129,233	49,98%	129,353	50,02%
Erzurum	628,001	12	2,00%	152,183	24,23%	475,818	75,77%	324,977	51,75%	303,024	48,25%
Eskişehir	415,101	33	1,32%	200,332	48,26%	214,769	51,74%	210,949	50,82%	204,152	49,18%
Gaziantep	511,026	19	1,63%	244,215	47,79%	266,811	52,21%	262,815	51,43%	248,211	48,57%
Giresun	428,015	32	1,36%	75,069	17,54%	352,946	82,46%	207,320	48,44%	220,695	51,56%
Gümüşhane	262,731	52	0,84%	31,957	12,16%	230,774	87,84%	123,907	47,16%	138,824	52,84%
Hakkari	83,937	67	0,27%	14,132	16,84%	69,805	83,16%	45,680	54,42%	38,257	45,58%
Hatay	506,154	20	1,61%	203,610	40,23%	302,544	59,77%	266,594	52,67%	239,560	47,33%
Isparta	266,240	49	0,85%	96,551	36,26%	169,689	63,74%	136,333	51,21%	129,907	48,79%
İçel	511,273	18	1,63%	189,382	37,04%	321,891	62,96%	262,008	51,25%	249,265	48,75%
Istanbul	2,293,823	1	7,31%	1,792,071	78,13%	501,752	21,87%	1,243,900	54,23%	1,049,923	45,77%
İzmir	1,234,667	3	3,93%	621,553	50,34%	613,114	49,66%	641,118	51,93%	593,549	48,07%
Kahramanmaraş	438,423	30	1,40%	105,090	23,97%	333,333	76,03%	222,104	50,66%	216,319	49,34%
Kars	606,313	13	1,93%	117,363	19,36%	488,950	80,64%	312,952	51,62%	293,361	48,38%
Kastamonu	441,638	29	1,41%	67,163	15,21%	374,475	84,79%	209,389	47,41%	232,249	52,59%
Kayseri	536,206	16	1,71%	191,221	35,66%	344,985	64,34%	266,972	49,79%	269,234	50,21%
Kırklareli	258,386	54	0,82%	85,856	33,23%	172,530	66,77%	137,823	53,34%	120,563	46,66%
Kırşehir	196,836	60	0,63%	42,000	21,34%	154,836	78,66%	95,762	48,65%	101,074	51,35%
Kocaeli	335,518	40	1,07%	136,531	40,69%	198,987	59,31%	177,915	53,03%	157,603	46,97%
Konya	1,122,622	4	3,58%	354,578	31,58%	768,044	68,42%	560,069	49,89%	562,553	50,11%
Kütahya	398,081	35	1,27%	87,084	21,88%	310,997	78,12%	200,954	50,48%	197,127	49,52%
Malatya	452,624	27	1,44%	147,040	32,49%	305,584	67,51%	230,274	50,88%	222,350	49,12%
Manisa	748,545	8	2,38%	265,857	35,52%	482,688	64,48%	381,798	51,01%	366,747	48,99%
Mardin	397,880	36	1,27%	90,093	22,64%	307,787	77,36%	205,313	51,60%	192,567	48,40%
Muğla	334,973	41	1,07%	59,330	17,71%	275,643	82,29%	166,339	49,66%	168,634	50,34%
Muş	198,716	59	0,63%	32,503	16,36%	166,213	83,64%	103,298	51,98%	95,418	48,02%
Nevşehir	203,316	58	0,65%	46,710	22,97%	156,606	77,03%	98,083	48,24%	105,233	51,76%
Niğde	362,444	38	1,15%	69,956	19,30%	292,488	80,70%	177,689	49,03%	184,755	50,97%
Ordu	543,863	15	1,73%	83,585	15,37%	460,278	84,63%	268,141	49,30%	275,722	50,70%
Rize	281,099	46	0,90%	63,554	22,61%	217,545	77,39%	130,070	46,27%	151,029	53,73%
Sakarya	404,078	34	1,29%	124,936	30,92%	279,142	69,08%	203,896	50,46%	200,182	49,54%
Samsun	755,946	6	2,41%	197,103	26,07%	558,843	73,93%	379,635	50,22%	376,311	49,78%
Siirt	264,832	51	0,84%	75,520	28,52%	189,312	71,48%	139,686	52,75%	125,146	47,25%
Sinop	266,069	50	0,85%	38,068	14,31%	228,001	85,69%	128,830	48,42%	137,239	51,58%
Sivas	705,186	10	2,25%	168,685	23,92%	536,501	76,08%	350,377	49,69%	354,809	50,31%
Tekirdağ	287,381	44	0,92%	96,897	33,72%	190,484	66,28%	150,140	52,24%	137,241	47,76%
Tokat	495,352	22	1,58%	123,403	24,91%	371,949	75,09%	251,748	50,82%	243,604	49,18%
Trabzon	595,782	14	1,90%	108,492	18,21%	487,290	81,79%	281,583	47,26%	314,199	52,74%
Tunceli	154,175	63	0,49%	23,240	15,07%	130,935	84,93%	78,112	50,66%	76,063	49,34%
Urfa	450,798	28	1,44%	150,383	33,36%	300,415	66,64%	230,612	51,16%	220,186	48,84%
Uşak	190,536	62	0,61%	57,133	29,99%	133,403	70,01%	94,315	49,50%	96,221	50,50%
Van	266,840	48	0,85%	60,686	22,74%	206,154	77,26%	142,446	53,38%	124,394	46,62%
Yozgat	437,883	31	1,39%	67,466	15,41%	370,417	84,59%	217,744	49,73%	220,139	50,27%
Zonguldak	650,191	11	2,07%	157,463	24,22%	492,728	75,78%	326,918	50,28%	323,273	49,72%

== Largest cities ==
Ranking	City	Population	Province
1	Istanbul	1,742,978	Istanbul
2	Ankara	905,660	Ankara
3	İzmir	329,052	İzmir
4	Adana	289,919	Adana
5	Bursa	211,644	Bursa
6	Eskişehir	173,882	Eskişehir
7	Gaziantep	160,152	Gaziantep
8	Konya	157,934	Konya
9	Kayseri	126,653	Kayseri
10	Sivas	108,320	Sivas
11	Samsun	107,510	Samsun
12	Erzurum	105,317	Erzurum
13	Malatya	104,428	Malatya
14	Diyarbakır	102,653	Diyarbakır
15	İzmit	89,547	Kocaeli
16	Mersin	86,692	İçel
17	Adapazarı	86,124	Sakarya
18	Karşıyaka	82,574	İzmir
19	Elazığ	78,605	Elazığ
20	Urfa	73,498	Şanlıurfa
21	Antalya	71,833	Antalya
22	Manisa	69,711	Manisa
23	İskenderun	69,382	Hatay
24	Balıkesir	69,341	Balıkesir
25	Trabzon	65,516	Trabzon
26	Denizli	64,331	Denizli
27	Maraş	63,284	Maraş
28	Antakya	57,855	Hatay
29	Tarsus	57,737	İçel
30	Kırıkkale	57,669	Ankara
31	Zonguldak	55,404	Zonguldak
32	Kütahya	49,301	Kütahya
33	Karabük	46,169	Zonguldak
34	Akhisar	46,167	Manisa
35	Edirne	46,091	Edirne
36	Erzincan	45,197	Erzincan
37	Afyonkarahisar	44,026	Afyonkarahisar
38	Aydın	43,483	Aydın
39	Çorum	41,574	Çorum
40	Kars	41,376	Kars
41	Nazilli	41,330	Aydın
42	Ceyhan	41,124	Adana
43	Ereğli	38,362	Konya
44	Kilis	38,095	Gaziantep
45	Tokat	37,368	Tokat
46	Turgutlu	35,674	Manisa
47	Uşak	35,517	Uşak
48	Amasya	34,168	Amasya
49	Osmaniye	34,027	Adana
50	Bandırma	33,116	Balıkesir
51	Van	31,431	Van
52	Mardin	30,974	Mardin
53	Ödemiş	30,580	İzmir
54	Bornova	30,445	İzmir
55	Burdur	29,268	Burdur
56	Salihli	28,909	Manisa
57	Isparta	28,328	Isparta
58	İnegöl	27,777	Bursa
59	Söke	27,558	Aydın
60	Siverek	27,527	Urfa
61	Ordu	27,303	Ordu
62	Tire	27,243	İzmir
63	Çorlu	27,187	Tekirdağ
64	Tekirdağ	27,069	Tekirdağ
65	Rize	26,989	Rize
66	Bafra	26,239	Samsun
67	Zile	26,113	Tokat
68	Karaman	26,051	Konya
69	Lüleburgaz	25,667	Kırklareli
70	Siirt	25,480	Siirt
71	Giresun	25,331	Giresun
72	Akşehir	25,269	Konya
73	Edremit	25,003	Balıkesir
74	Batman	24,990	Siirt
75	Kırşehir	24,861	Kırşehir
76	Kırklareli	24,790	Kırklareli
77	Aksaray	24,414	Niğde
78	Ağrı	24,168	Ağrı
79	Bergama	24,121	İzmir
80	Kastamonu	23,485	Kastamonu
81	Merzifon	23,410	Amasya
82	Kırıkhan	23,405	Hatay
83	Mustafakemalpaşa	23,179	Bursa
84	Yozgat	23,081	Yozgat
85	Çanakkale	22,789	Çanakkale
86	Nizip	22,675	Gaziantep
87	Turhal	22,658	Tokat
88	Polatlı	22,558	Ankara
89	Düzce	22,274	Bolu
90	Adıyaman	22,153	Adıyaman
91	Niğde	21,663	Niğde
92	Uzunköprü	21,537	Edirne
93	Çankırı	21,450	Çankırı
94	Gölcük	21,444	Kocaeli
95	Nevşehir	21,121	Nevşehir
96	Keşan	20,293	Edirne
97	Kozan	20,236	Adana
98	Bolvadin	20,139	Afyonkarahisar
99	Kartal	20,139	Istanbul
100	Ereğli	18,978	Zonguldak
101	Bitlis	18,725	Bitlis
102	Soma	18,633	Manisa
103	Karacabey	18,368	Bursa
104	Çarşamba	18,003	Samsun
105	Sarıkamış	16,618	Kars
106	Menemen	16,588	İzmir
107	Reyhanlı	16,469	Hatay
108	Muğla	16,408	Muğla
109	Ayvalık	16,283	Balıkesir
110	Alaşehir	16,012	Manisa
111	Samandağı	15,990	Hatay
112	Kadirli	15,926	Adana
113	Gemlik	15,716	Bursa
114	Iğdır	15,701	Kars
115	Muş	15,687	Muş
116	Birecik	15,317	Urfa
117	Bayburt	15,184	Gümüşhane
118	Ünye	15,039	Ordu
119	Bor	14,309	Niğde
120	Bartın	14,259	Zonguldak
121	Yalova	14,241	Istanbul
122	Tosya	14,119	Kastamonu
123	Erciş	14,072	Van
124	Babaeski	13,879	Kırklareli
125	İslahiye	13,775	Gaziantep
126	Tavşanlı	13,652	Kütahya
127	Elbistan	13,492	Maraş
128	Develi	13,411	Kayseri
129	Sinop	13,354	Sinop
130	Erbaa	13,168	Tokat
131	Karapınar	12,989	Konya
132	Milas	12,987	Muğla
133	Gelibolu	12,945	Çanakkale
134	Sungurlu	12,886	Çorum
135	Burhaniye	12,597	Balıkesir
136	Niksar	12,577	Tokat
137	Urla	12,454	İzmir
138	Alanya	12,436	Antalya
139	İskilip	12,400	Çorum
140	Kırkağaç	12,162	Manisa
141	Silvan	12,158	Diyarbakır
142	Biga	12,063	Çanakkale
143	Yerköy	11,962	Yozgat
144	Silifke	11,864	İçel
145	Bingöl	11,727	Bingöl
146	Torbalı	11,712	İzmir
147	Şereflikoçhisar	11,683	Ankara
148	Gönen	11,666	Balıkesir
149	Besni	11,625	Adıyaman
150	Dörtyol	11,595	Hatay
151	Çayeli	11,496	Rize
152	Yenişehir	11,352	Bursa
153	Dinar	11,298	Afyonkarahisar
154	Bayındır	11,273	İzmir
155	Susurluk	11,268	Balıkesir
156	Anamur	11,246	İçel
157	Viranşehir	11,063	Urfa
158	Emirdağ	10,914	Afyonkarahisar
159	Yalvaç	10,912	Isparta
160	Bozhüyük	10,842	Bilecik
161	Hendek	10,788	Sakarya
162	Tatvan	10,786	Bitlis
163	Malkara	10,763	Tekirdağ
164	Ergani	10,528	Diyarbakır
165	Midyat	10,391	Mardin
166	Havza	10,338	Samsun
167	Erdemli	10,304	İçel
168	Çumra	10,299	Konya
169	Yahyalı	10,283	Kayseri
170	Selçuk	10,227	İzmir
171	Gümüşhacıköy	10,199	Amasya
172	Ilgın	10,196	Konya
173	Sandıklı	10,192	Afyonkarahisar
174	Maden	10,166	Elazığ
175	Bucak	10,094	Burdur
176	Kaman	10,067	Kırşehir
177	Demirci	10,050	Manisa

Population of Turkey according to language
Language	Census 1935		Census 1945		Census 1965	
Language	Number	%	Number	%	Number	%
Turkish	13,899,073	86.0	16,598,037	88.3	28,175,579	90.2
Kurdish	1,489,246	9.2	1,476,562	7.9	2,108,721	6.9
Zazaki	1,489,246	9.2	1,476,562	7.9	147,707	0.5
Arabic	153,687	1.0	247,204	1.3	368.971	1.2
Greek	108,725	0.7	88,680	0.5	49.143	0.2
Circassian	91,972	0.6	66,691	0.4	57,337	0.2
Ladino	79,000	0.5	51,019	0.3	9,124	0.0
Armenian	77,000	0.5	56,179	0.3	32,484	0.1
Laz	63,253	0.4	46,987	0.3	27,715	0.1
Georgian	57,325	0.4	40,076	0.2	32,334	0.1
Abaza	10,099	0.1	8,602	0.0	10,643	0.0
others			110,137	0.6	157,449	0.5
Total	15,803,000		18,790,174		31,391,207	

== Mother tongues ==
=== National level ===
Languages spoken in Turkey, 1965 census
Language	Mother tongue	Only language spoken	Second best language spoken
Abaza	4,563	280	7,556
Albanian	12,832	1,075	39,613
Arabic	365,340	189,134	167,924
Armenian	33,094	1,022	22,260
Bosnian	17,627	2,345	34,892
Bulgarian	4,088	350	46,742
Pomak	23,138	2,776	34,234
Chechen	7,563	2,500	5,063
Circassian	58,339	6,409	48,621
Croatian	45	1	1,585
Czech	168	25	76
Dutch	366	23	219
English	27,841	21,766	139,867
French	3,302	398	96,879
Georgian	34,330	4,042	44,934
German	4,901	790	35,704
Greek	48,096	3,203	78,941
Italian	2,926	267	3,861
Kurdish (Kurmanji)	2,233,071	1,323,912	429,168
Judæo-Spanish	9,981	283	3,510
Laz	26,007	3,943	55,158
Persian	948	72	2,103
Polish	110	20	377
Portuguese	52	5	3,233
Romanian	406	53	6,909
Russian	1,088	284	4,530
Serbian	6,599	776	58,802
Spanish	2,791	138	4,297
Turkish	28,289,680	26,925,649	1,387,139
Zaza	150,644	92,288	20,413
Total	31,009,934	28,583,607	2,786,610

=== Provincial level ===
Languages spoken in Turkey by provinces, 1965 census
Province / Language	Turkish	Kurdish	Arabic	Zazaki	Circassian	Greek	Georgian	Armenian	Laz	Pomak	Bosnian	Albanian	Jewish
Adana (Note: Including Osmaniye)	866,316	7,581	22,356	332	51	51	0	28	9	0	312	483	29
Adıyaman	143,054	117,325	7	6,705	0	0	0	84	4	0	0	0	0
Afyonkarahisar	499,461	125	19	1	2,172	169	2	2	1	16	14	2	1
Ağrı	90,021	156,316	105	4	2	2	77	5	0	1	103	0	0
Amasya	279,978	2,179	9	2	1,497	6	1,378	208	6	0	10	336	1
Ankara (Note: Including Kırıkkale)	1,590,392	36,798	814	21	393	124	41	66	120	7	126	833	64
Antalya	486,697	23	2	0	0	14	0	0	2	0	0	1	0
Artvin	190,183	46	4	0	0	4	7,698	1	12,093	1	1	0	0
Aydın	523,583	168	85	0	112	71	4	1	4	0	26	88	0
Balıkesir	698,679	560	38	8	3,144	236	1,273	9	205	1,707	314	24	4
Bilecik	137,674	5	4	0	736	4	73	1	1	2	6	3	0
Bingöl	62,668	56,881	19	30,878	17	0	1	11	1	0	0	0	3
Bitlis	56,161	92,327	3,263	2,082	205	1	5	16	0	0	0	1	2
Bolu (Note: Including parts of Düzce)	375,786	363	0	0	1,593	3	1,541	488	1,791	0	40	6	1
Burdur	194,910	2	7	0	0	3	12	0	0	0	0	1	0
Bursa	746,633	386	22	672	799	106	2,938	35	517	65	1,169	1,928	69
Çanakkale	338,379	443	0	25	1,604	5,258	4	9	12	3,675	516	6	121
Çankırı (Note: Including parts of Karabük)	250,510	158	1	0	0	1	0	3	2	0	0	0	0
Çorum	474,638	8,736	4	0	1,808	12	8	51	3	7	0	0	0
Denizli	462,860	283	28	5	8	97	1	1	0	2	1	3	0
Diyarbakır	178,644	236,113	2,536	57,693	1	1	3	134	3	48	1	5	0
Edirne	290,610	386	104	21	9	18	2	12	3	10,285	329	58	92
Elazığ	244,016	47,446	17	30,921	0	2	0	2	30	12	3	2	0
Erzincan	243,911	14,323	13	298	4	5	0	12	2	3	0	1	0
Erzurum	555,632	69,648	86	2,185	109	8	4	11	24	7	1	5	1
Eskişehir	406,212	327	42	0	1,390	4	3	0	14	23	114	78	0
Gaziantep	490,046	18,954	885	1	4	6	0	4	3	0	1	11	0
Giresun	425,665	305	1	1	2	0	2,029	0	5	0	0	0	0
Gümüşhane (Note: Including Bayburt)	260,419	2,189	0	0	91	0	0	0	17	0	0	0	0
Hakkari (Note: Including parts of Şırnak)	10,357	72,365	165	0	1	0	1	21	2	0	0	0	0
Hatay	350,080	5,695	127,072	7	780	767	11	376	6	2	8	44	1
Isparta	265,305	688	75	11	8	91	0	1	2	1	1	3	4
Mersin	500,207	1,067	9,430	23	76	137	13	12	19	3	3	9	1
Istanbul	2,185,741	2,586	2,843	26	317	35,097	849	29,479	128	165	3,072	4,341	8,608
İzmir	1,214,219	863	352	5	1,287	898	15	17	15	1,289	2,349	1,265	753
Kars (Note: Including Ardahan and Iğdır)	471,287	133,144	61	992	215	6	8	5	24	1	5	4	1
Kastamonu (Note: Including parts of Düzce)	439,355	1,090	2	0	3	2	180	849	1	0	0	0	0
Kayseri	509,932	8,454	34	8	17,110	1	1	9	6	9	15	160	1
Kırklareli	252,594	602	136	24	5	3	5	3	7	3,375	1,148	144	11
Kırşehir	185,489	11,309	4	0	2	0	0	0	1	0	1	0	0
Kocaeli	320,808	235	0	10	1,467	63	2,755	46	2,264	381	3,827	22	7
Konya (Note: Including Karaman)	1,092,819	27,811	67	4	1,139	3	7	1	5	1	11	75	0
Kütahya	397,221	105	13	2	17	4	2	88	9	0	0	34	0
Malatya	374,449	77,794	33	10	14	5	7	148	5	4	0	3	0
Manisa	746,514	241	15	0	488	42	67	2	6	54	116	192	3
Kahramanmaraş	386,010	46,548	21	0	4,185	0	0	13	3	0	0	9	0
Mardin (Note: Including parts of Batman and parts of Şırnak)	35,494	265,328	79,687	60	75	11	15	11	0	0	1	6	0
Muğla	334,883	6	4	1	0	28	0	0	0	1	0	0	4
Muş	110,555	83,020	3,575	507	898	0	1	3	103	0	0	0	0
Nevşehir	203,156	22	0	0	0	0	0	0	0	0	0	22	0
Niğde (Note: Including Aksaray)	353,146	8,991	10	0	227	5	0	12	4	0	15	4	0
Ordu	538,978	12	0	0	5	0	4,815	34	0	1	0	1	0
Rize	275,291	11	1	1	0	9	4	0	5,754	1	0	1	0
Sakarya	388,481	2,163	32	3	538	6	4,535	2	2,671	23	2,899	794	1
Samsun	747,115	1,366	3	0	3,401	91	2,350	5	51	319	10	610	0
Siirt (Note: Including parts of Batman and parts of Şırnak)	46,722	179,023	38,273	484	1	0	15	98	3	0	10	0	0
Sinop	261,341	2,126	0	0	659	1	1,144	228	3	5	0	7	3
Sivas	649,099	32,284	19	23	2,086	0	0	217	1	0	515	0	0
Tekirdağ	284,222	548	76	18	5	19	52	8	2	1,627	6	51	102
Tokat	471,383	17,543	7	1,007	5,934	0	367	45	2	86	0	964	0
Trabzon	590,799	72	12	0	0	4,535	1	11	0	0	0	0	0
Tunceli	120,553	33,431	20	2,370	28	0	0	4	0	18	10	8	0
Şanlıurfa	207,652	175,100	51,090	14,554	3	0	5	2	4	0	2	0	0
Uşak	190,506	16	2	0	1	0	0	4	1	0	0	0	0
Van	118,481	147,694	557	3	1	2	1	1	8	0	1	1	66
Yozgat	433,385	2,424	1	0	1,597	2	0	118	0	0	14	1	0
Zonguldak (Note: Including Bartın and parts of Karabük)	649,757	43	26	0	5	17	2	3	15	0	1	1	1

Provinces with Turkish speakers in majority Provinces with Turkish speakers in plurality Provinces with Kurdish speakers in plurality Provinces with Kurdish speakers in majority

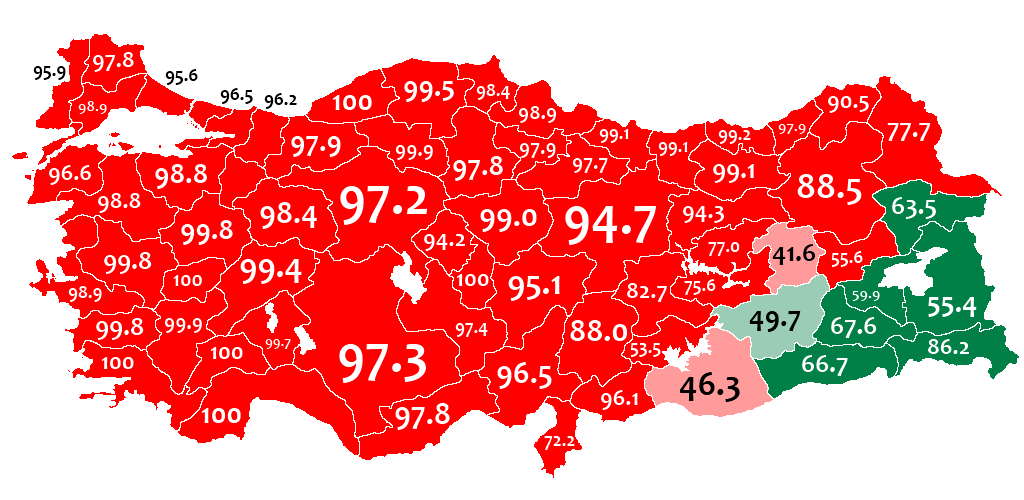
Turkish- and Kurdish-speaking pluralities

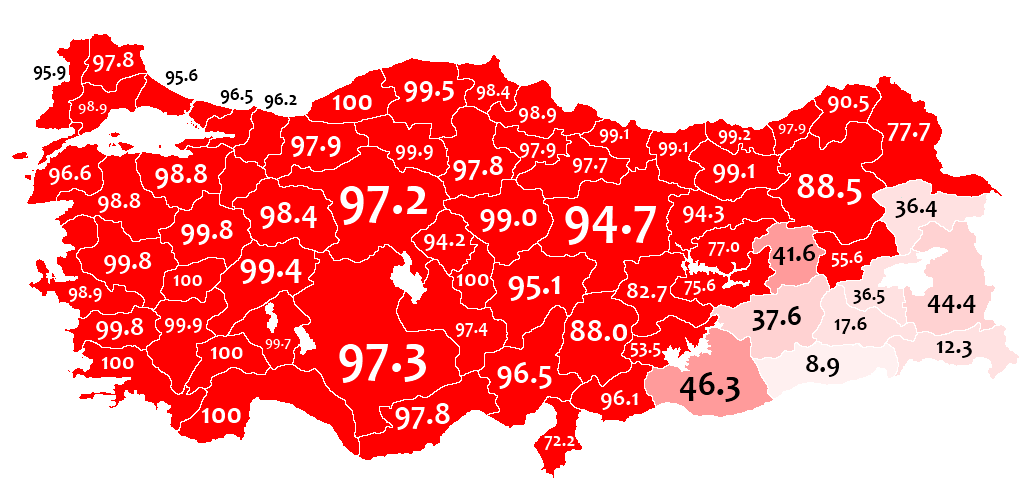
Turkish-speaking population

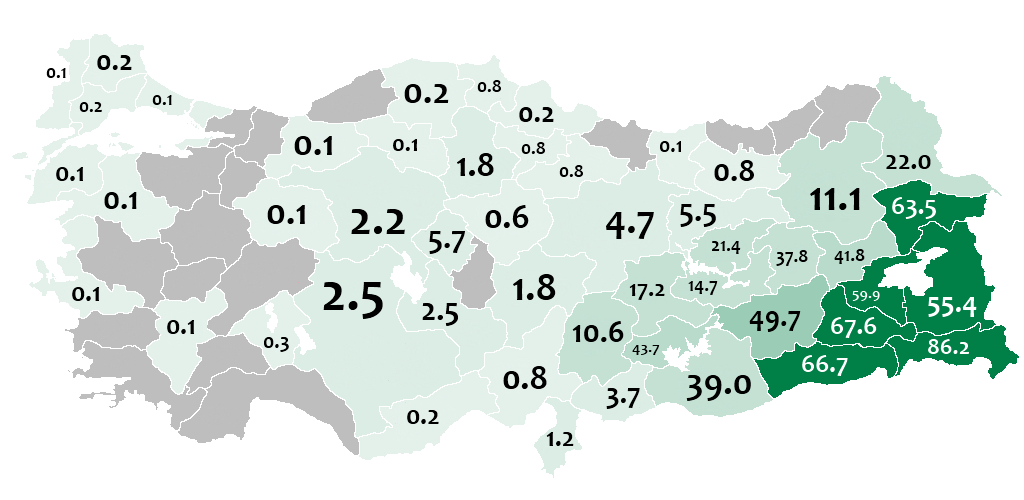
Kurdish-speaking population

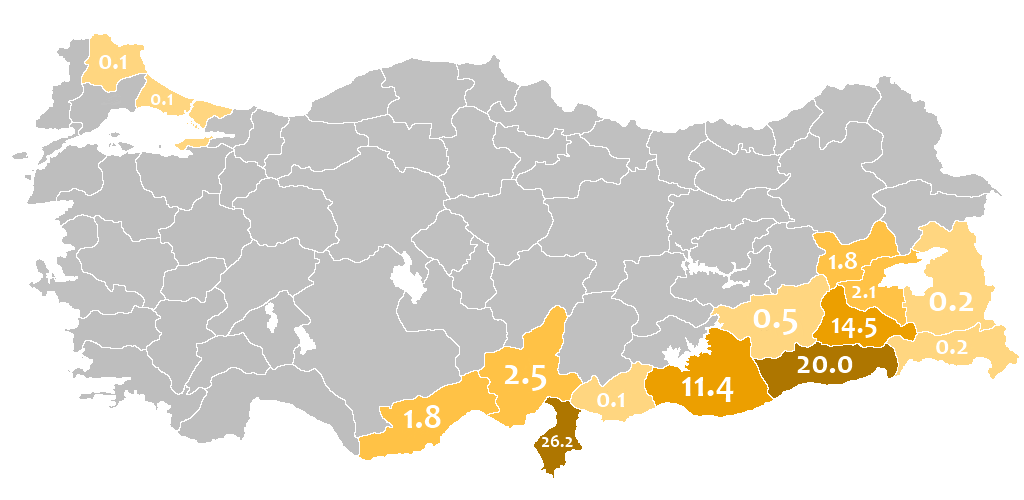
Arabic-speaking population

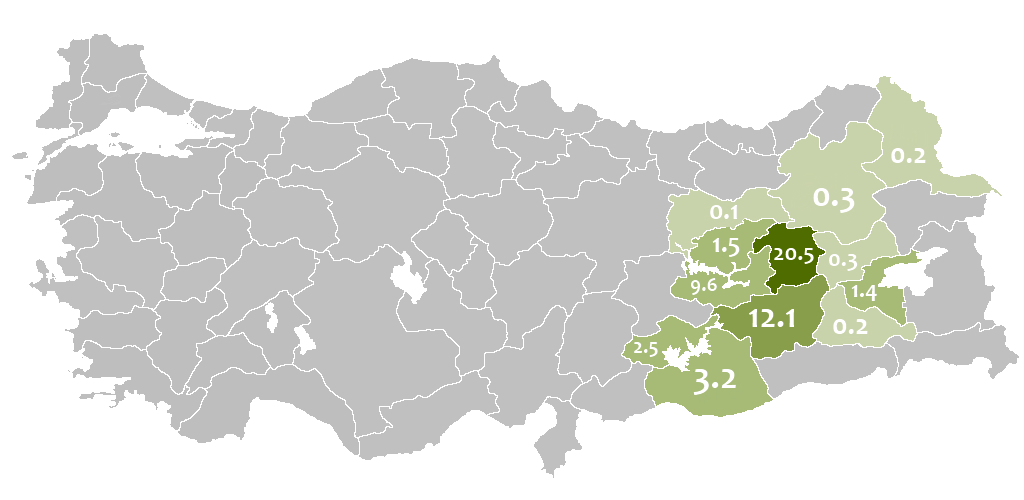
Zaza-speaking population

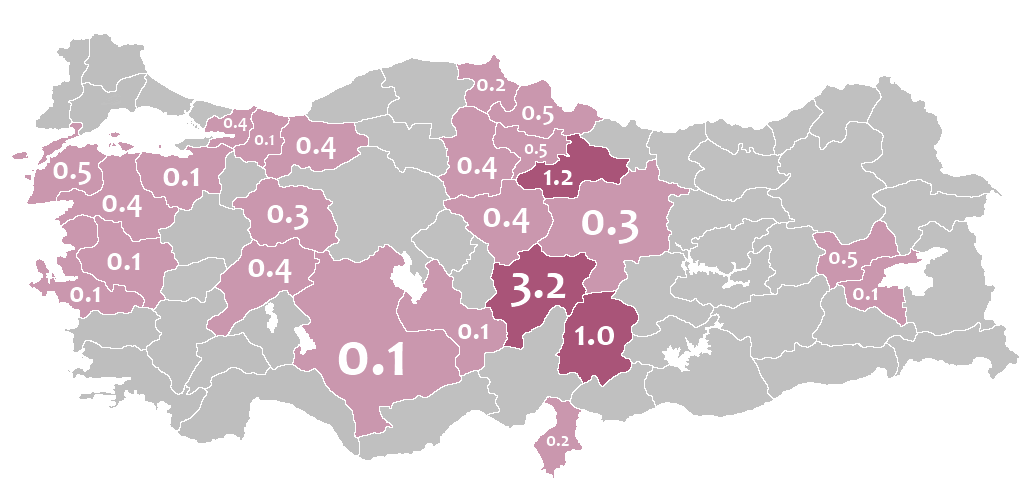
Circassian-speaking population

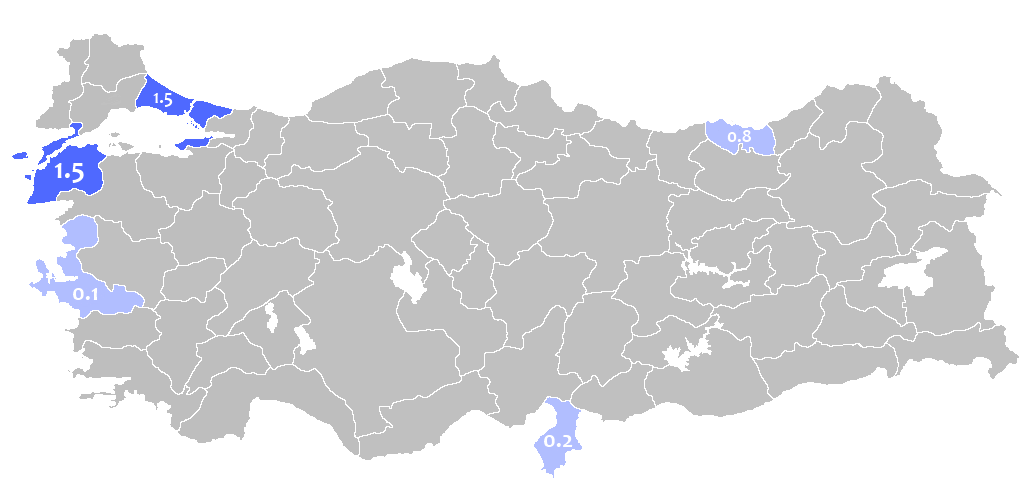
Greek-speaking population

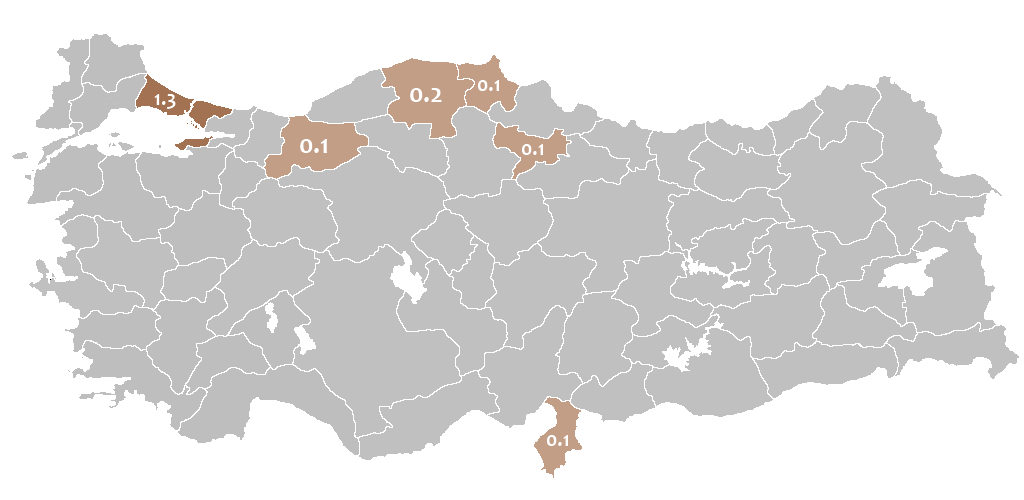
Armenian-speaking population

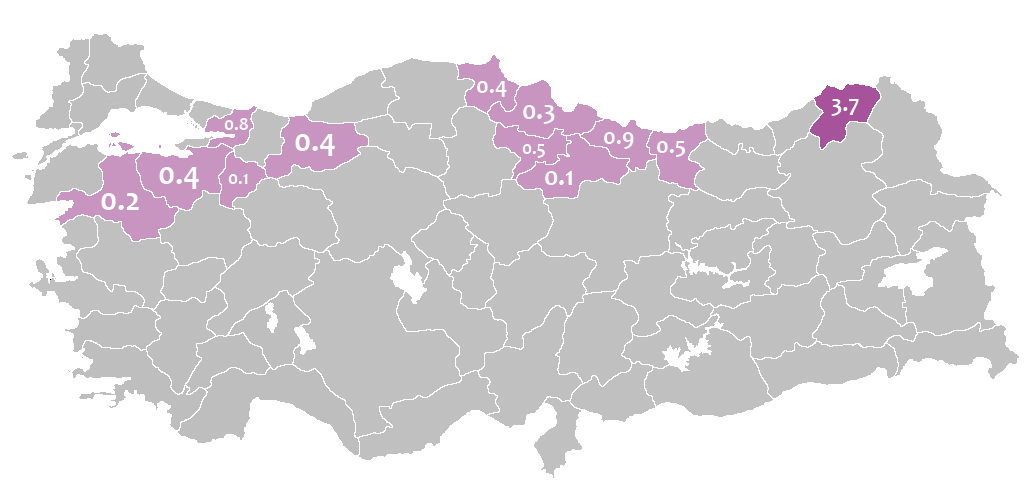
Georgian-speaking population

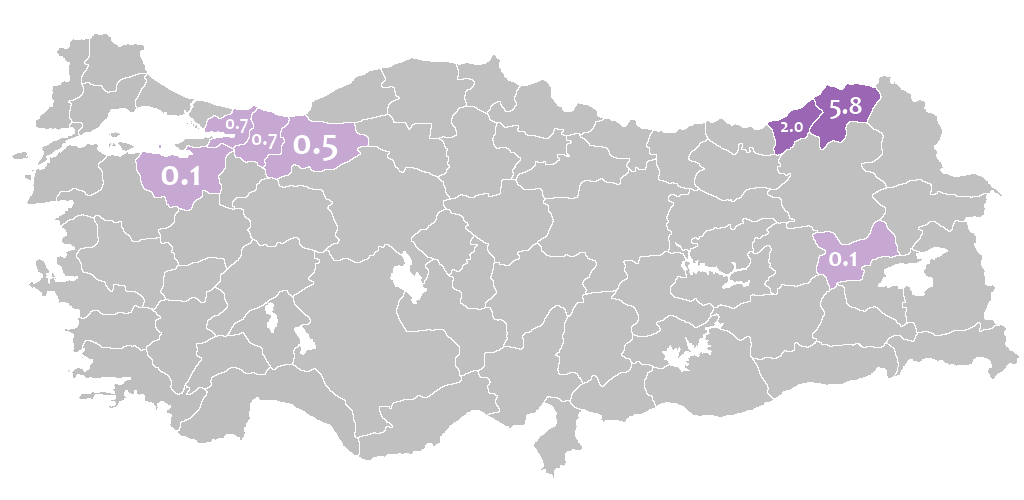
Laz-speaking population

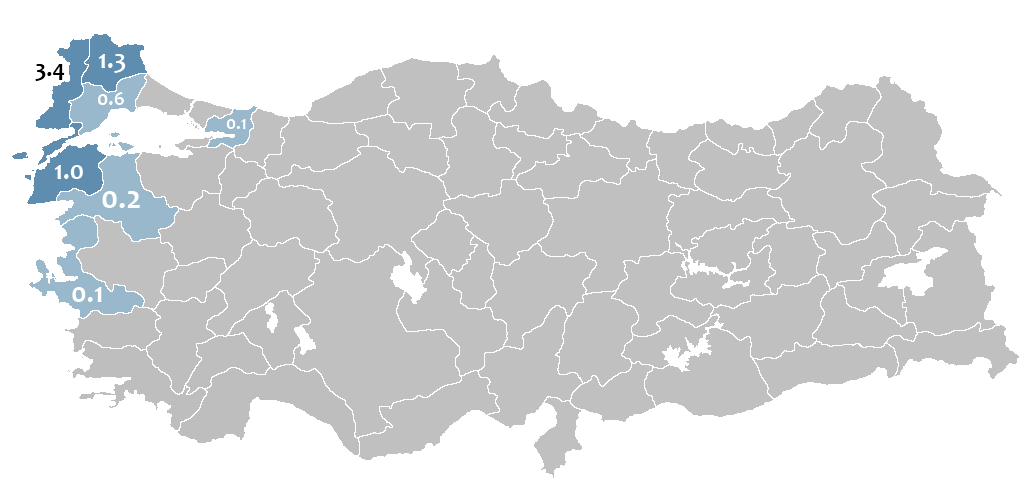
Pomak-speaking population

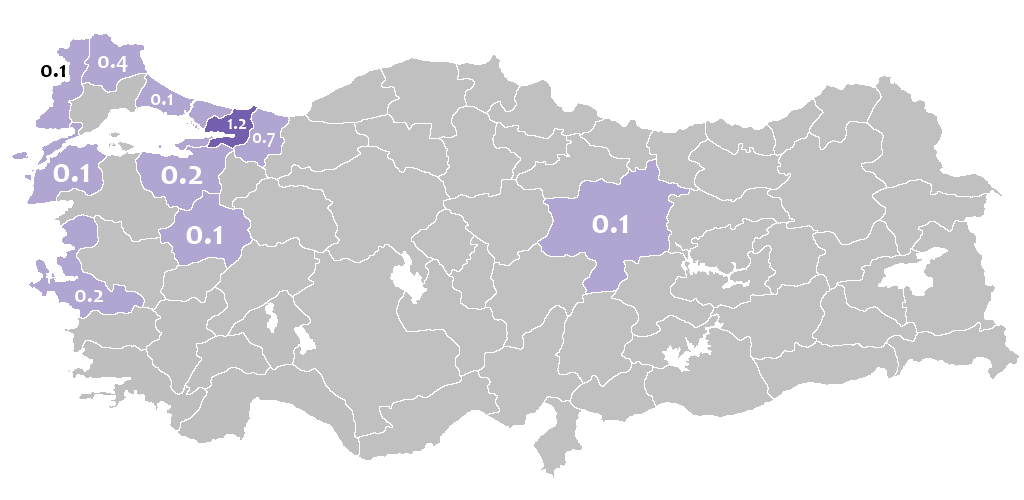
Bosnian-speaking population

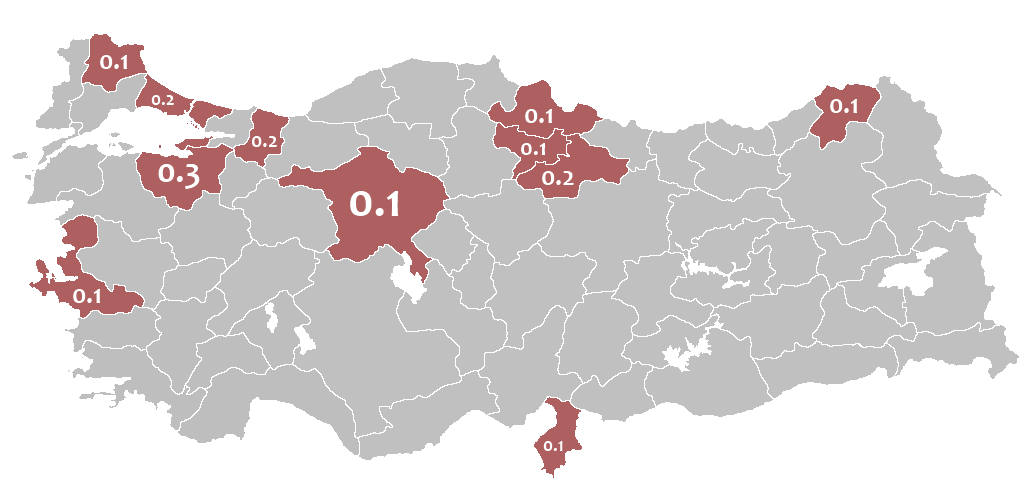
Albanian-speaking population

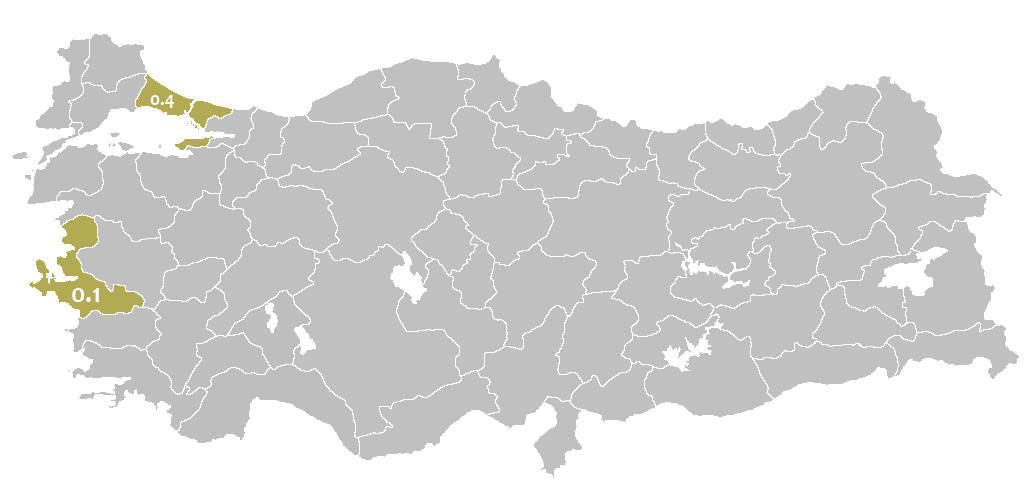
"Jewish"-speaking population

=== Maps of provinces in Turkey by percentage of spoken first language ===
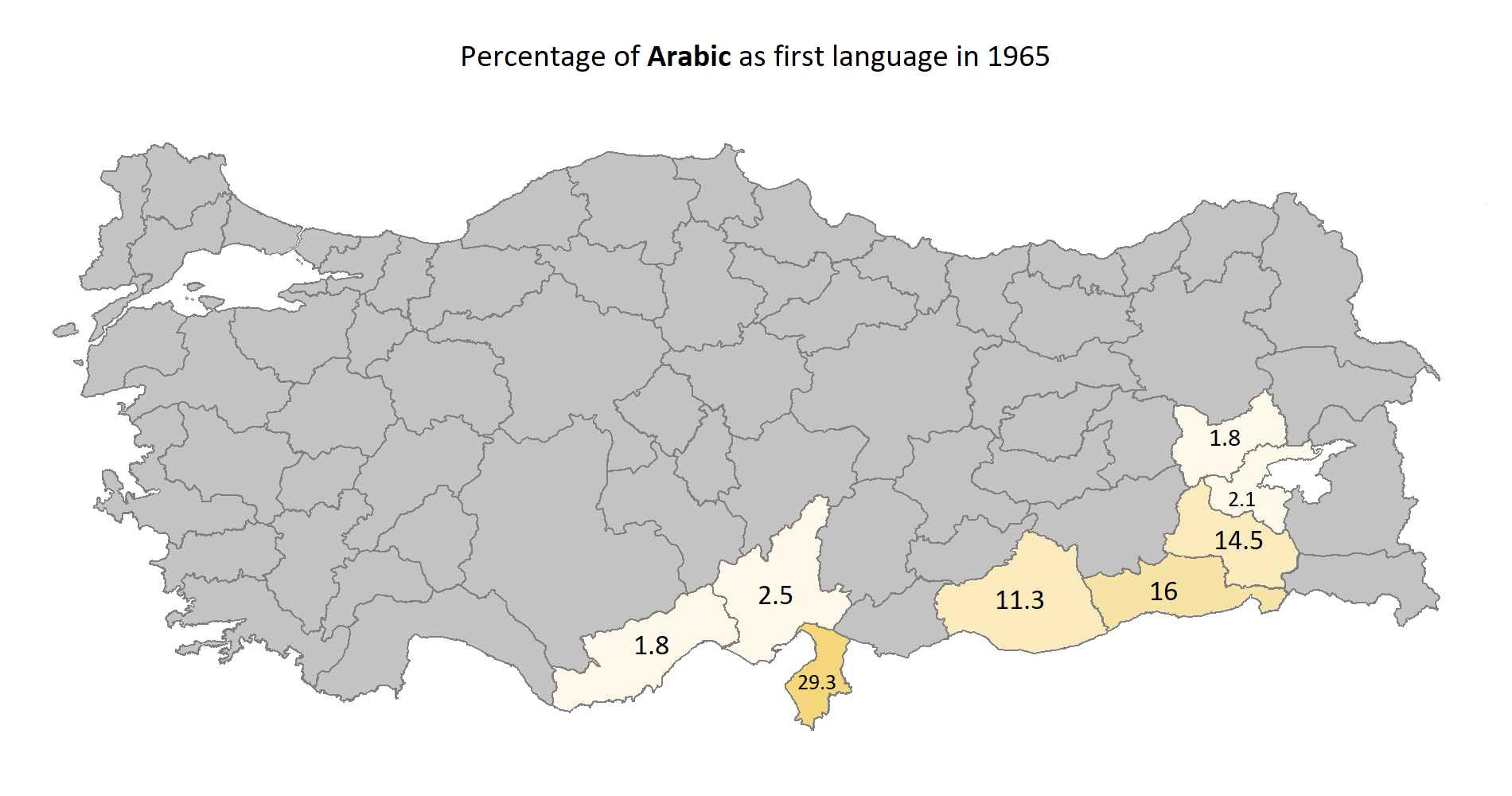
Arabic

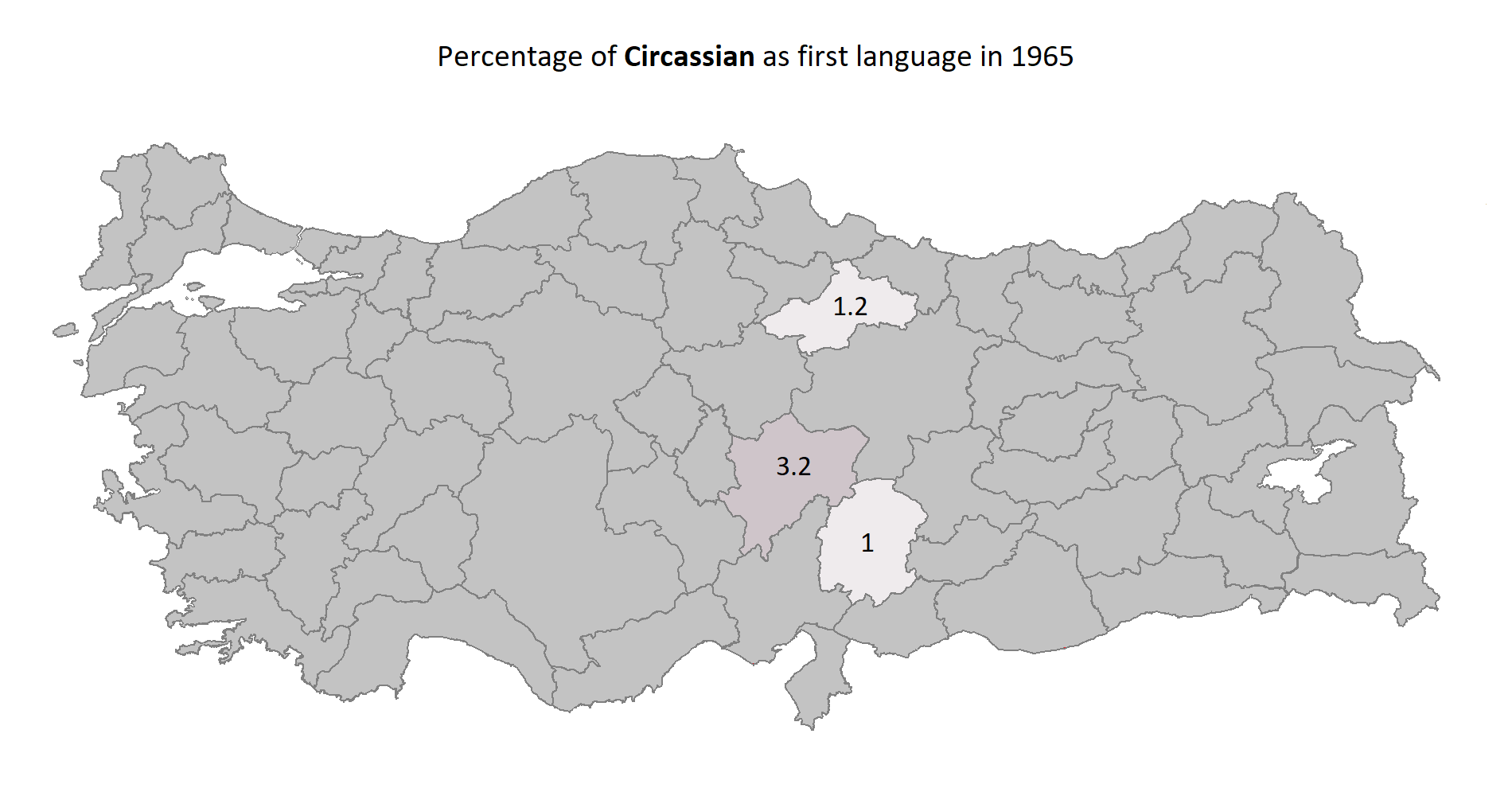
Circassian

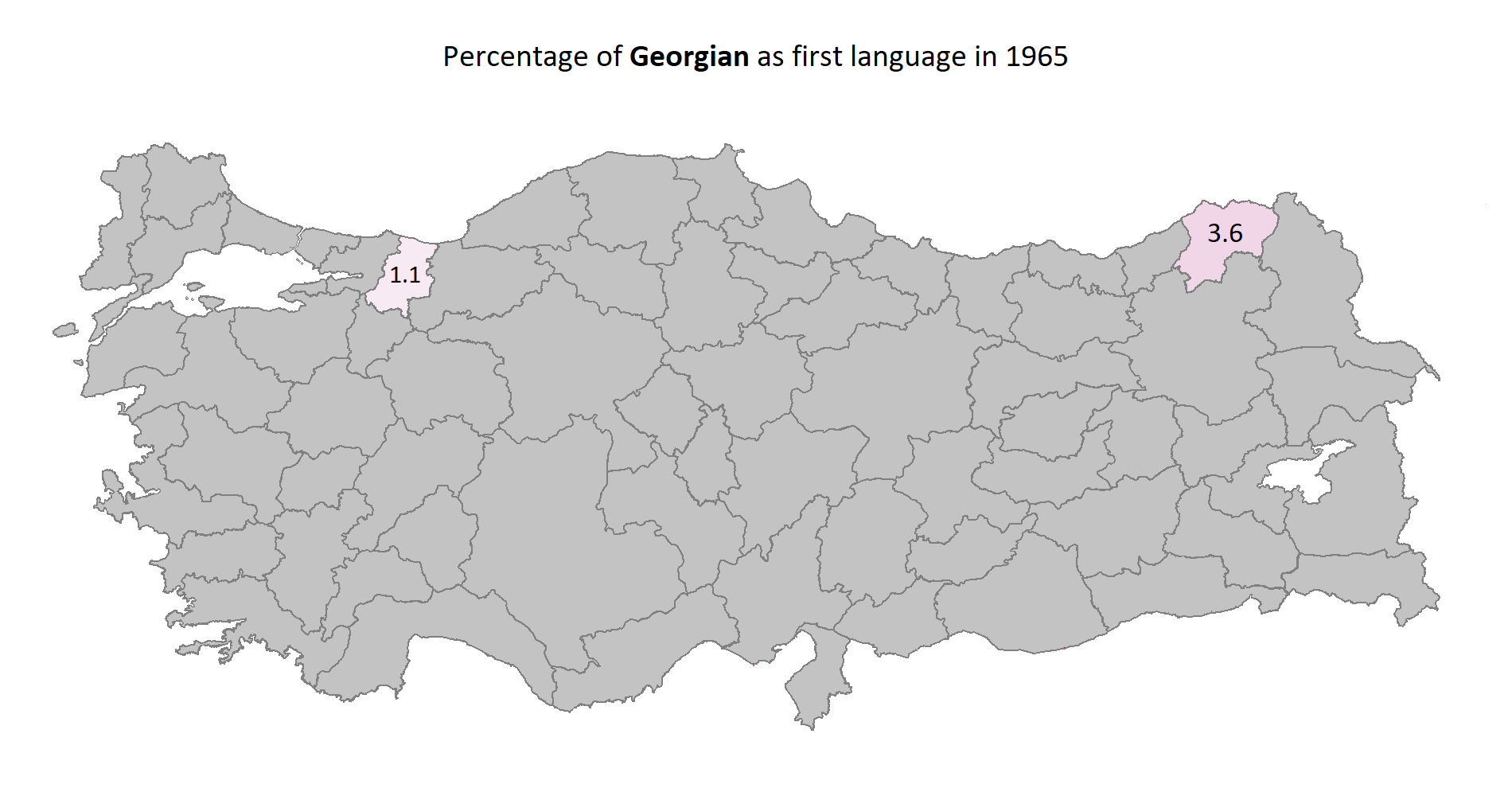
Georgian

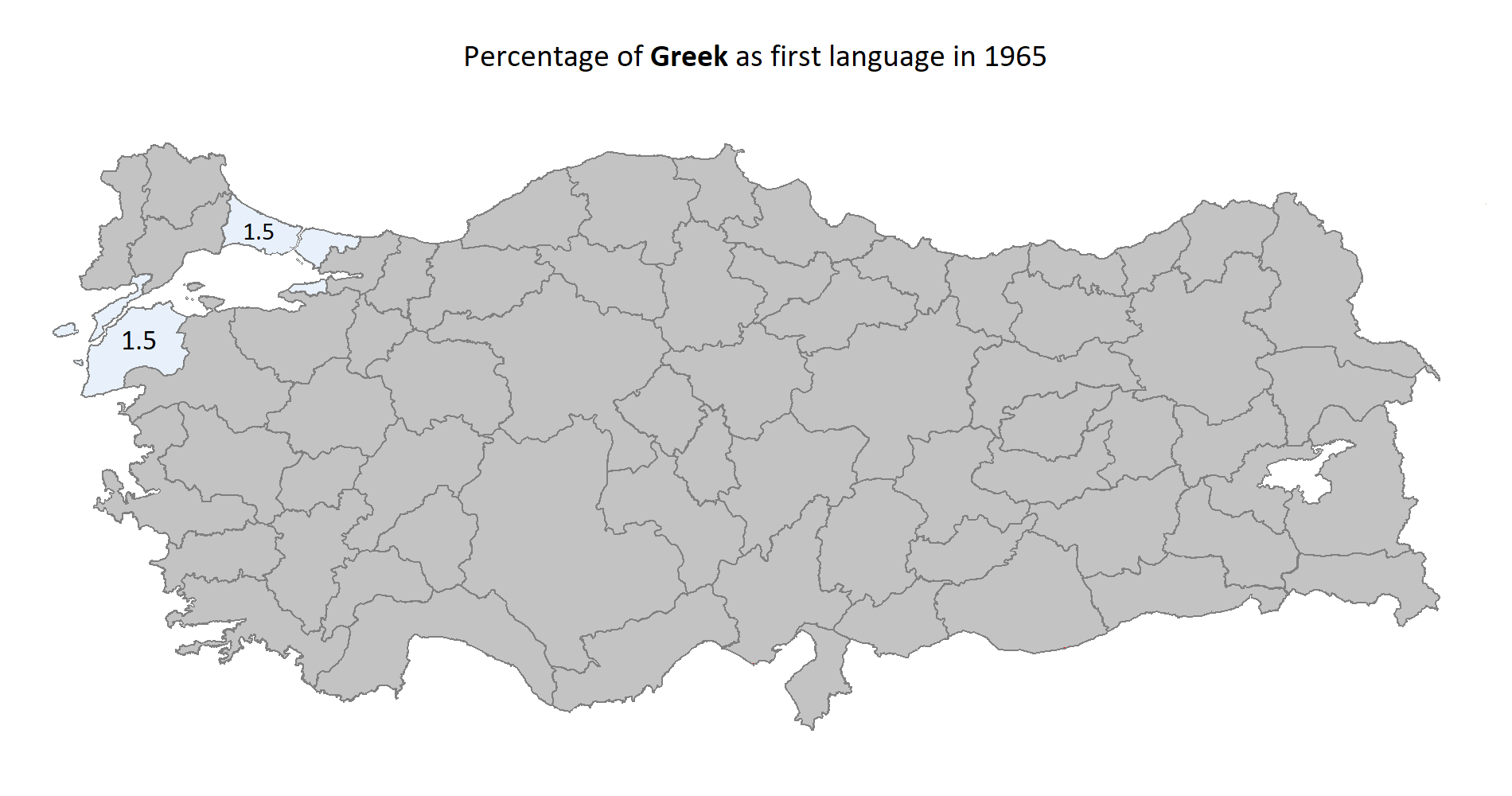
Greek

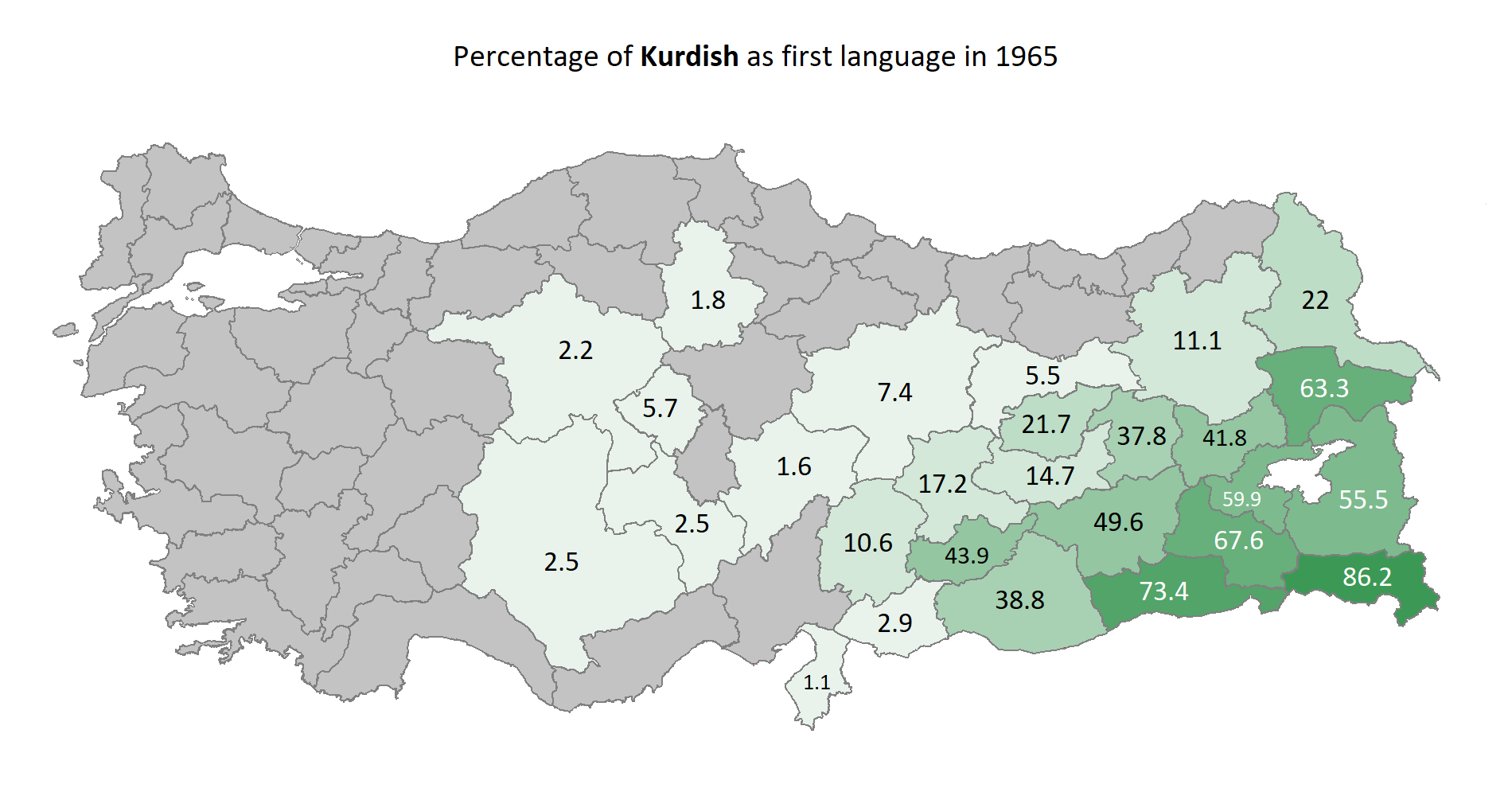
Kurdish

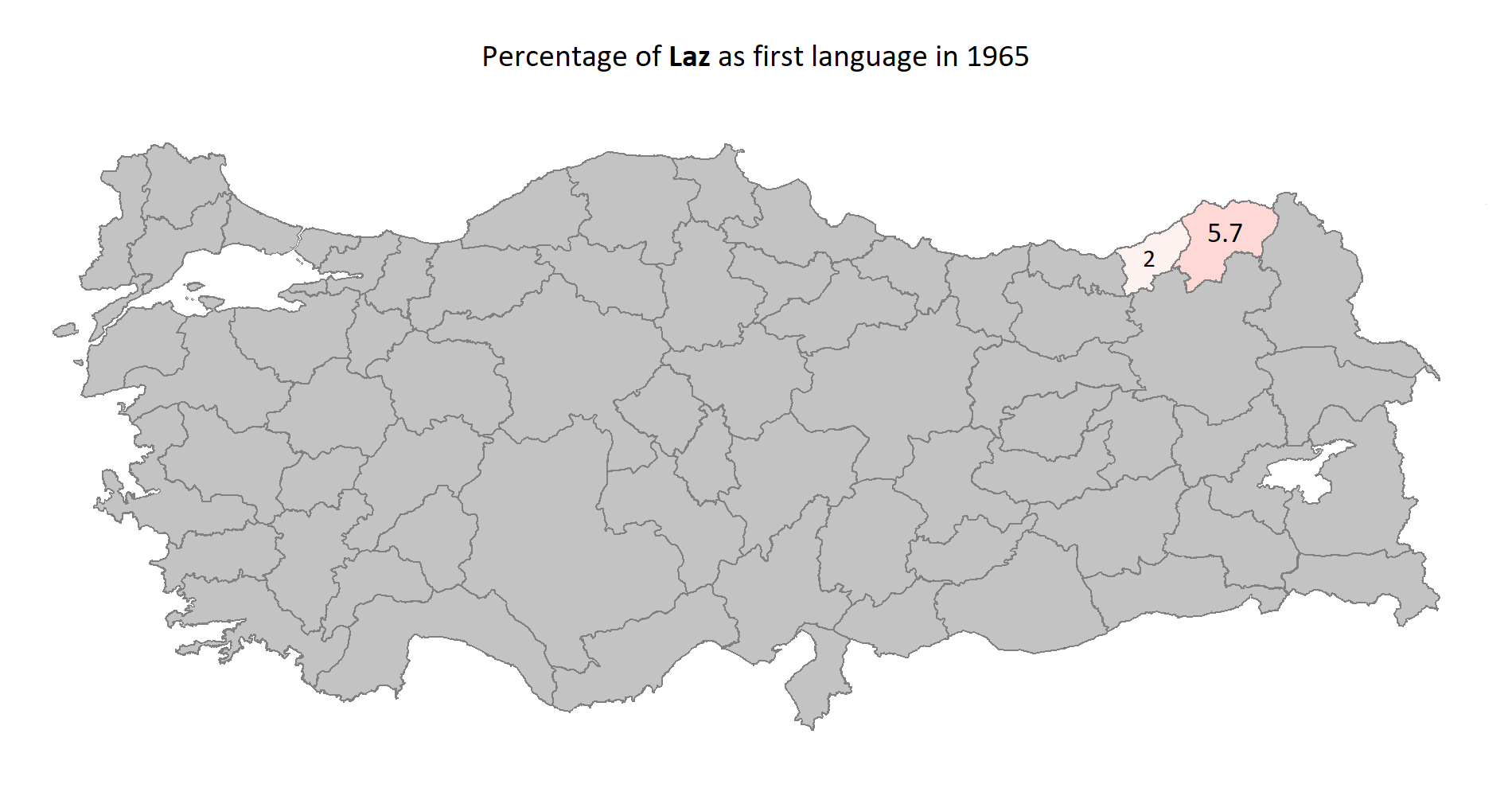
Laz

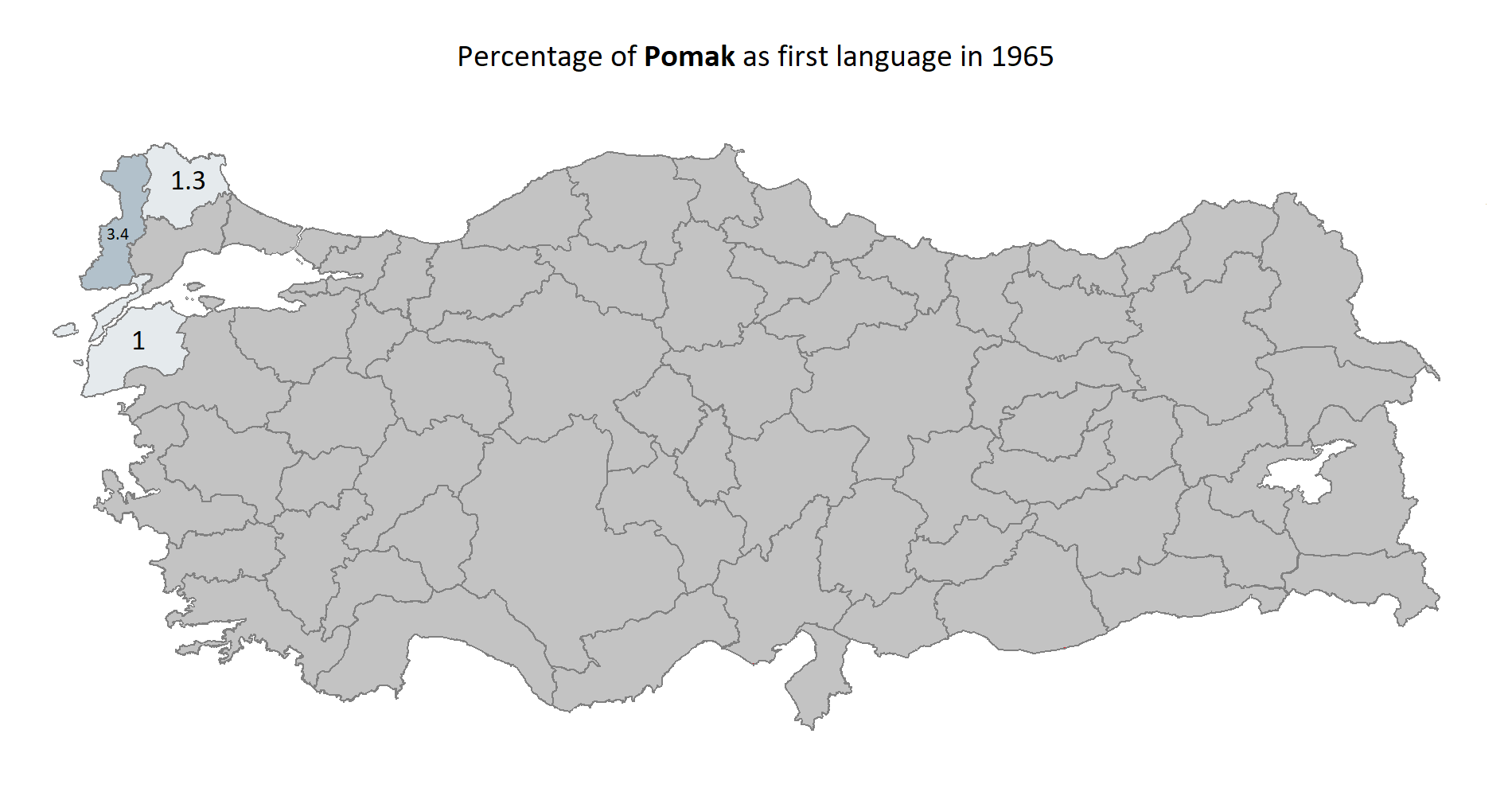
Pomak

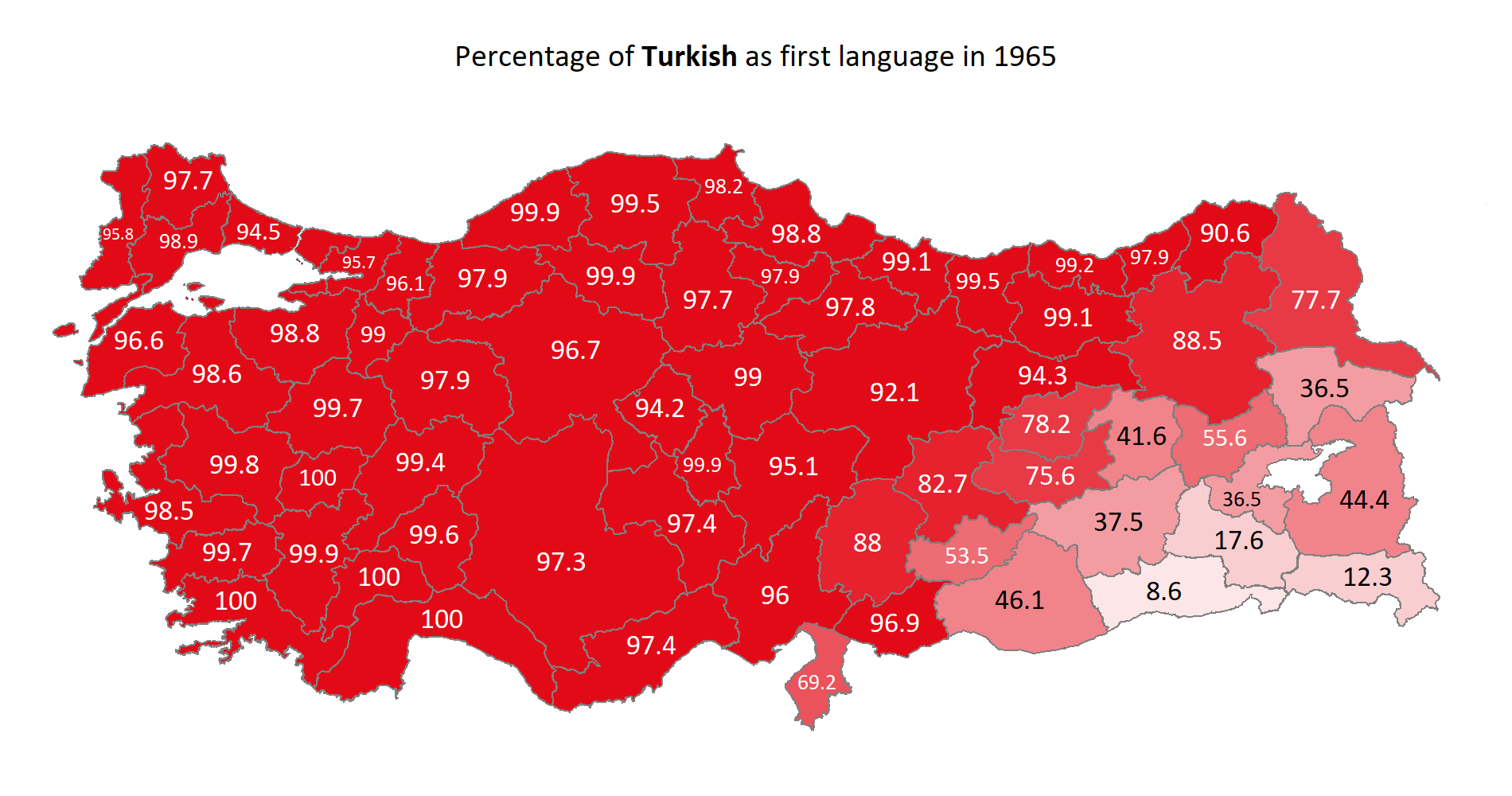
Turkish

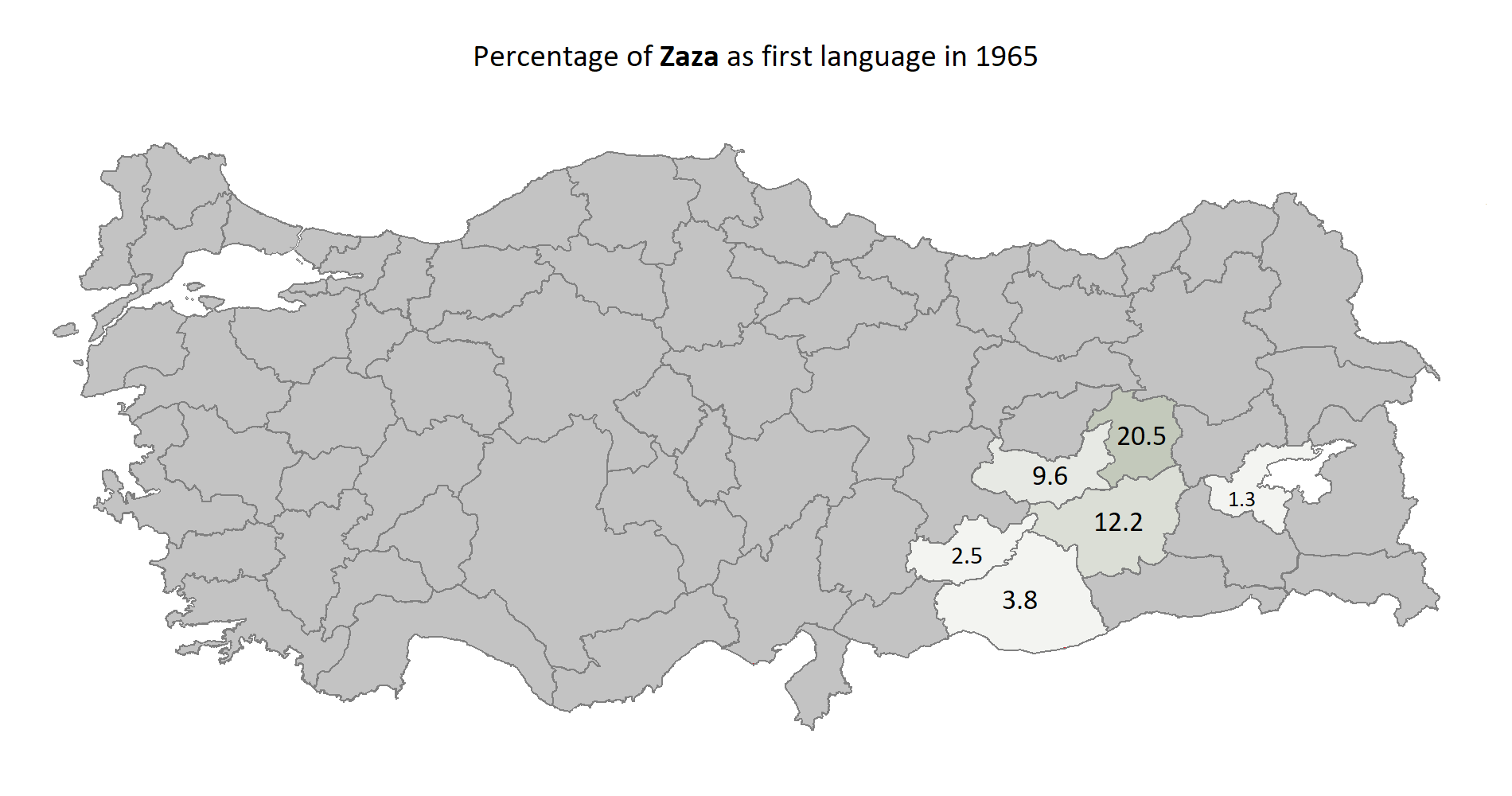
Zaza

== Sources ==
- Türkiye İstatistik Kurumu
