= Manisa Province =

Province of Turkey

Manisa Province Manisa ili
- Province and metropolitan municipality
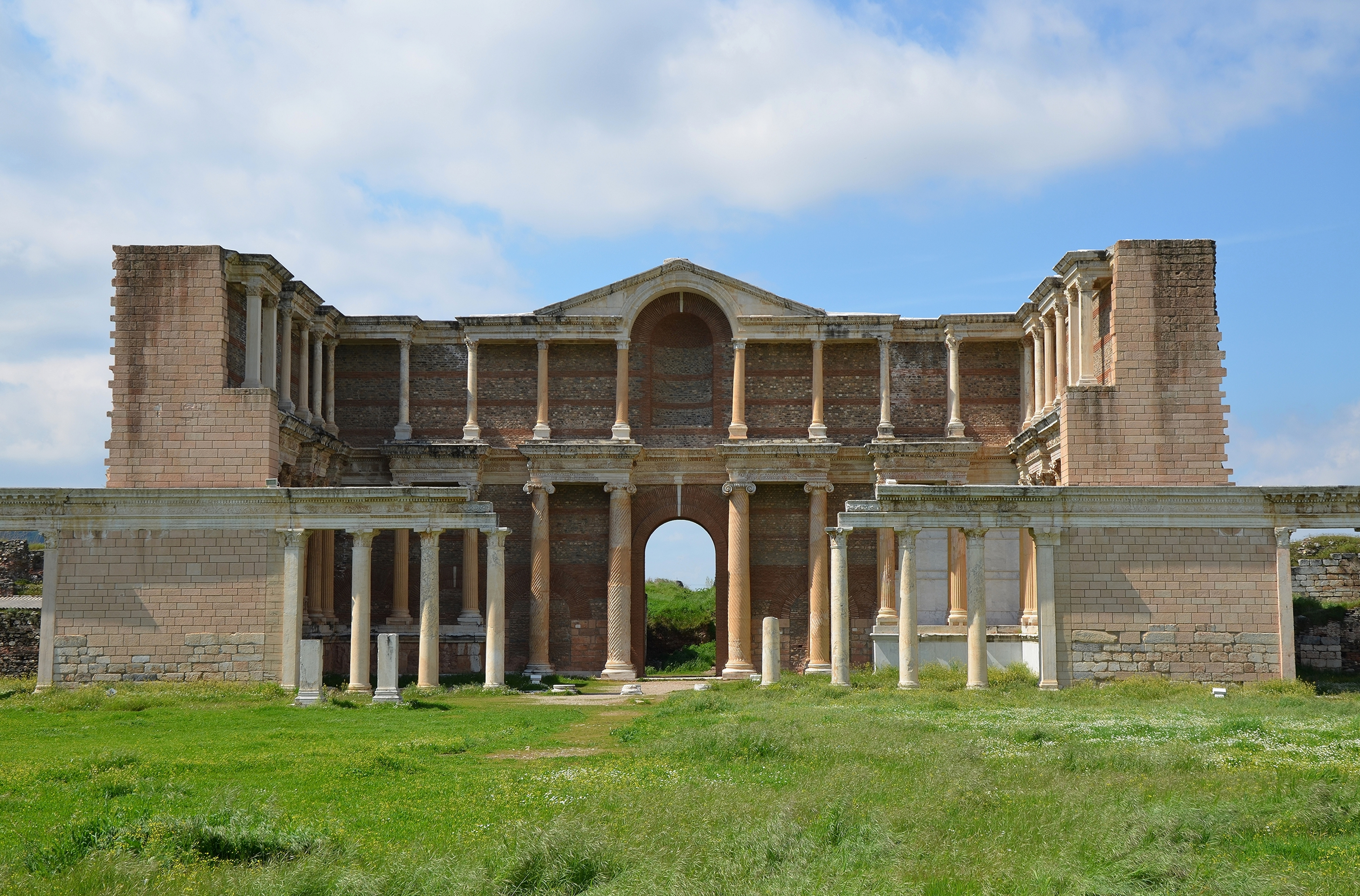
- Sardis

- Location of the province within Turkey
- Coordinates: 38°44′58″N 28°07′22″E
- Country: Turkey
- Seat: Manisa

Government
  - Mayor: Besim Dutlulu (CHP)
  - Vali: Vahdettin Özkan
- Area: 13,339 km^{2} (5,150 sq mi)
- Population (2022): 1,468,279
  - Density: 110.07/km^{2} (285.09/sq mi)
- Time zone: UTC+3 (TRT)
- Area code: 0236
- ISO code: TR-45
- Website: www.manisa.bel.tr www.manisa.gov.tr

Manisa Province (Turkish: Manisa ili) is a province and metropolitan municipality in western Turkey. Its area is 13,339 km^{2}, and its population is 1,468,279 (2022). Its neighboring provinces are İzmir to the west, Aydın to the south, Denizli to the southeast, Uşak to the east, Kütahya to the northeast, and Balıkesir to the north. The city of Manisa is the seat and capital of the province. The traffic code is 45.

== Districts ==
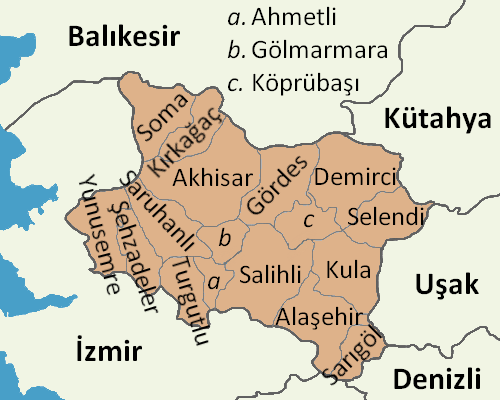

- Ahmetli
- Akhisar
- Alaşehir
- Demirci
- Gölmarmara
- Gördes
- Kırkağaç
- Köprübaşı
- Kula
- Salihli
- Sarıgöl
- Saruhanlı
- Şehzadeler
- Selendi
- Soma
- Turgutlu
- Yunusemre

== Sites of interest ==
Mount Sipylus National Park (Spil Dağı Milli Parkı) near the city of Manisa embraces a richly forested area, hot springs, the famous "crying rock" of Niobe, and a Hittite carving of the mother-goddess Cybele. The park boasts about 120 varieties of native plants within its boundaries, especially wild tulips. The park provides opportunities for mountaineering and camping.

Sardis, in the present-day municipality of Salihli, was the ancient capital of Lydia, once ruled by King Croesus, who was renowned for his wealth. Due to numerous earthquakes, most of the visible remains date back only to Roman times. There are the remains of the temple of Artemis and a restored gymnasium, exhibiting of the past splendor of this ancient city. The splendid synagogue from the 3rd century is worth visiting, with its elaborate mosaics and artfully carved colored-stone panels.

Akhisar, the ancient city of Thyatira, was one of the Seven Churches of the Book of Revelation and the remains of the ancient city is found in part of the city called Tepe Mezarlığı (hill cemetery). More recently, it has become an important commercial center in the province and is its second largest after Manisa.

The city of Alaşehir is where the remains of the ancient city of Philadelphia, another of the Seven Churches, is found. There is little left of the ancient city, except some ruins of a Byzantine church.

St. Jean Rum Ortodoks Kilisesi, a now destroyed church in Şehzadeler.

The villages of Mount Yunt (Yunt Dağı) and the towns of Gördes, Kula and Demirci are known for their carpets and kilims. The houses in Kula are also local examples of Ottoman architecture.

In addition, there are many thermal springs throughout the area.

The province is highly developed in terms of industrial activities, which are concentrated in the largest four centers of Manisa, Turgutlu, Akhisar and Salihli.

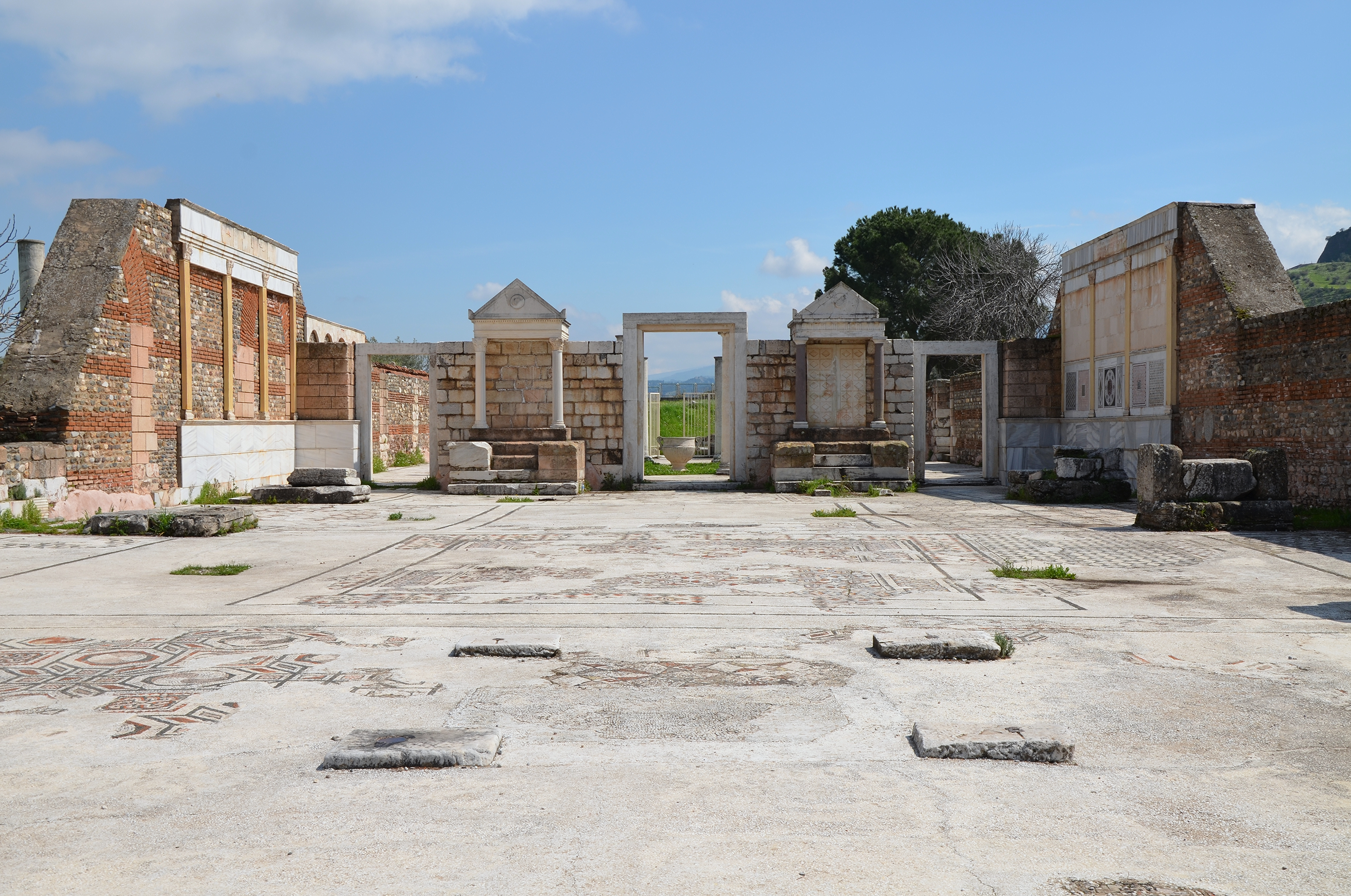
Ancient synagogue in Sardis, Manisa

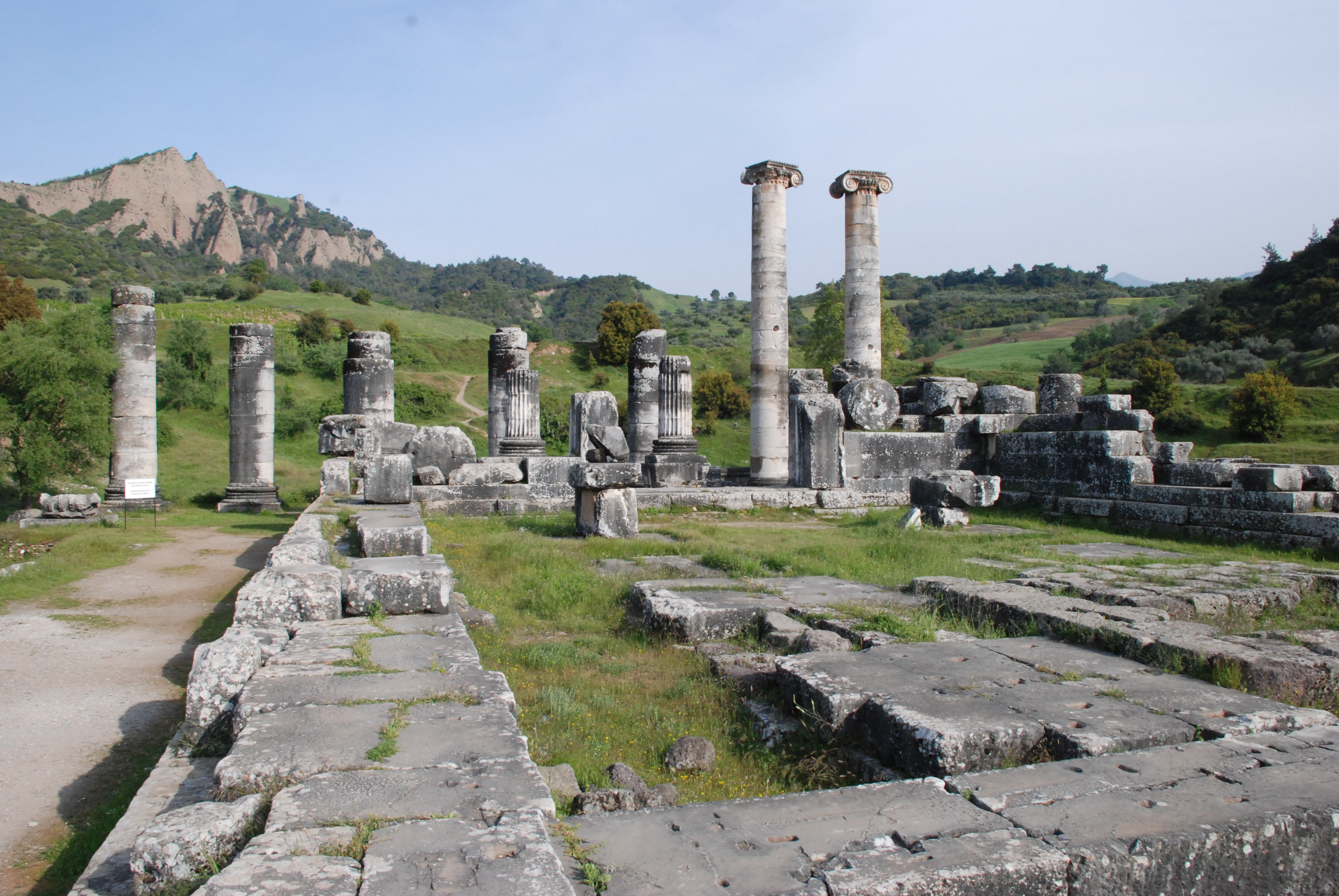
Temple of Artemis in Sardis

== See also ==
- List of municipalities in Manisa Province
- List of populated places in Manisa Province
