= Yunusemre =

- District and municipality
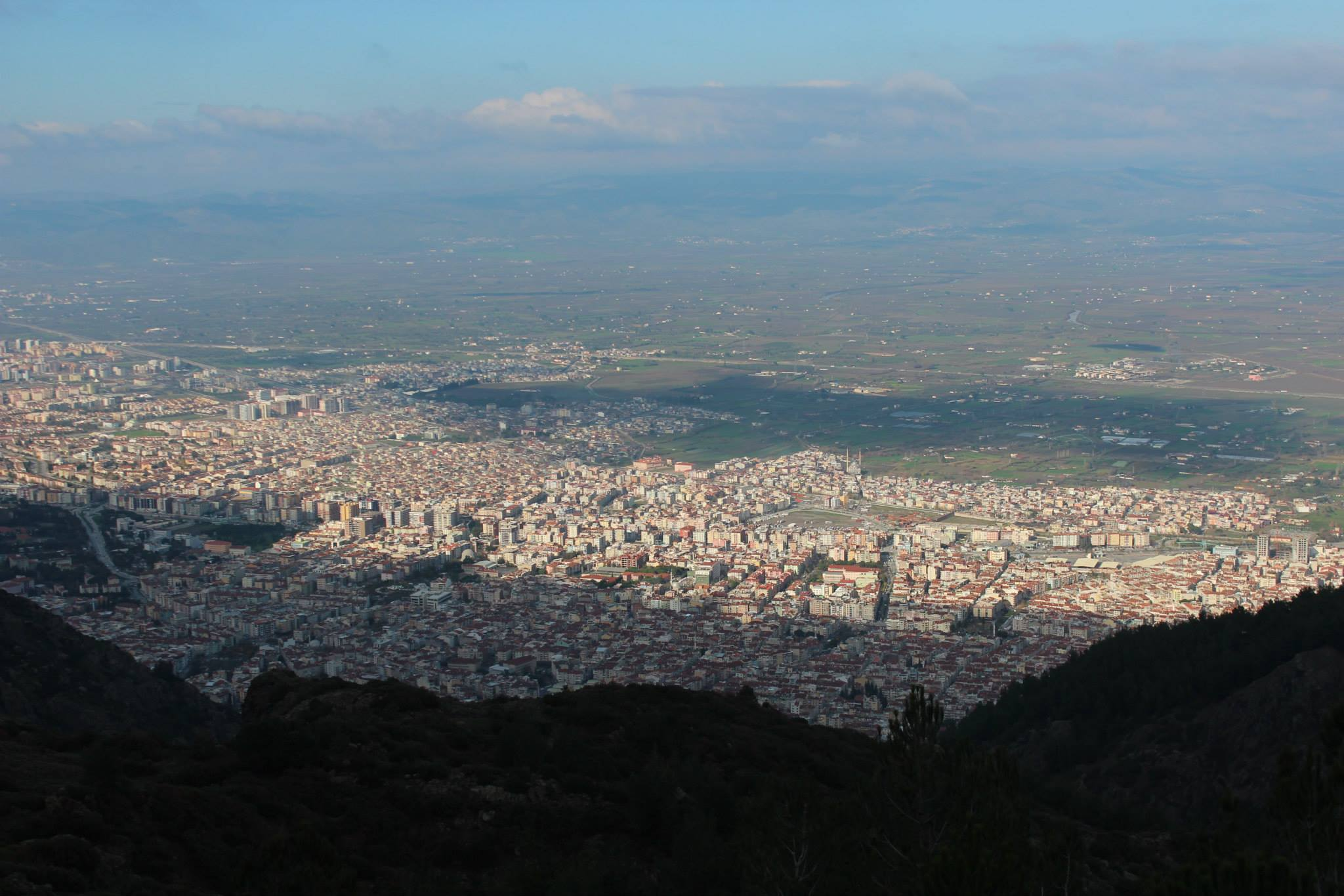
- General view of Yunusemre

- Logo

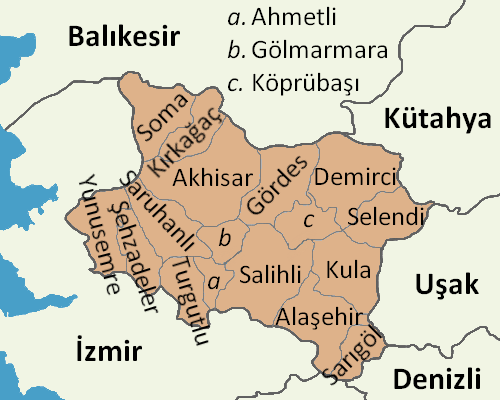
- Map showing Yunusemre District in Manisa Province

- Location within Turkey Location within Turkey Aegean
- Coordinates: 38°37′N 27°25′E
- Country: Turkey
- Province: Manisa

Government
  - Mayor: Musa Semih Balaban (CHP)
- Area: 823 km^{2} (318 sq mi)
- Population (2022): 266,514
  - Density: 324/km^{2} (839/sq mi)
- Time zone: UTC+3 (TRT)
- Area code: 0236
- Website: www.yunusemre.bel.tr

Yunusemre is a municipality and district of Manisa Province, Turkey. Its area is 823 km^{2}, and its population is 266,514 (2022). It covers the western part of the agglomeration of Manisa and the adjacent countryside.

The district Yunusemre was created at the 2013 reorganisation from part of the former central district of Manisa Province, along with the new district Şehzadeler. Its name refers to Yunus Emre, a Turkish poet of the 13th and 14th centuries.

== Composition ==
There are 87 neighbourhoods in Yunusemre District:

- 50.Yıl
- 75.Yıl
- Akçaköy
- Akgedik
- Akmescit
- Asmacık
- Atatürk
- Avdal
- Ayni Ali
- Bağyolu
- Barbaros
- Beydere
- Bostanlar
- Büyüksümbüller
- Çamlıca
- Cumhuriyet
- Davutlar
- Dazyurt
- Demirci
- Durasıllı
- Düzlen
- Emlakdere
- Evrenos
- Fatih
- Fevzi Çakmak
- Gökçeler
- Gülbahçe
- Gürle
- Güzelyurt
- Hafsasultan
- İlyasçılar
- Karaahmetli
- Karaali
- Karahüseyinli
- Karakılıçlı
- Karakoca
- Karaveliler
- Karayağcıhacılar
- Kayapınar
- Kaynak
- Keçiliköy
- Kışlaköy
- Kocakoru
- Koruköy
- Kozaklar
- Küçükbelen
- Küçüksümbüller
- Kuyualan
- Lalapaşa
- Laleli
- Maldan
- Merkez Efendi
- Mesir
- Mollasüleymanlı
- Muradiye
- Müslih
- Mutlu
- Örencik
- Örselli
- Ortaköy
- Osmancalı
- Otmanlar
- Pelitalan
- Pınarköy
- Recepli
- Sakallı
- Şamar
- Sarıahmetli
- Sarınasuhlar
- Sarma
- Siyekli
- Spil
- Sümbültepe
- Süngüllü
- Tevfikiye
- Topçuasım
- Turgutalp
- Türkmen
- Üçpınar
- Uncubozköy
- Uzunburun
- Uzunlar
- Yağcılar
- Yaylaköy
- Yenice
- Yenimahalle
- Yuntdağıköseler
