= Şehzadeler =

- District and municipality
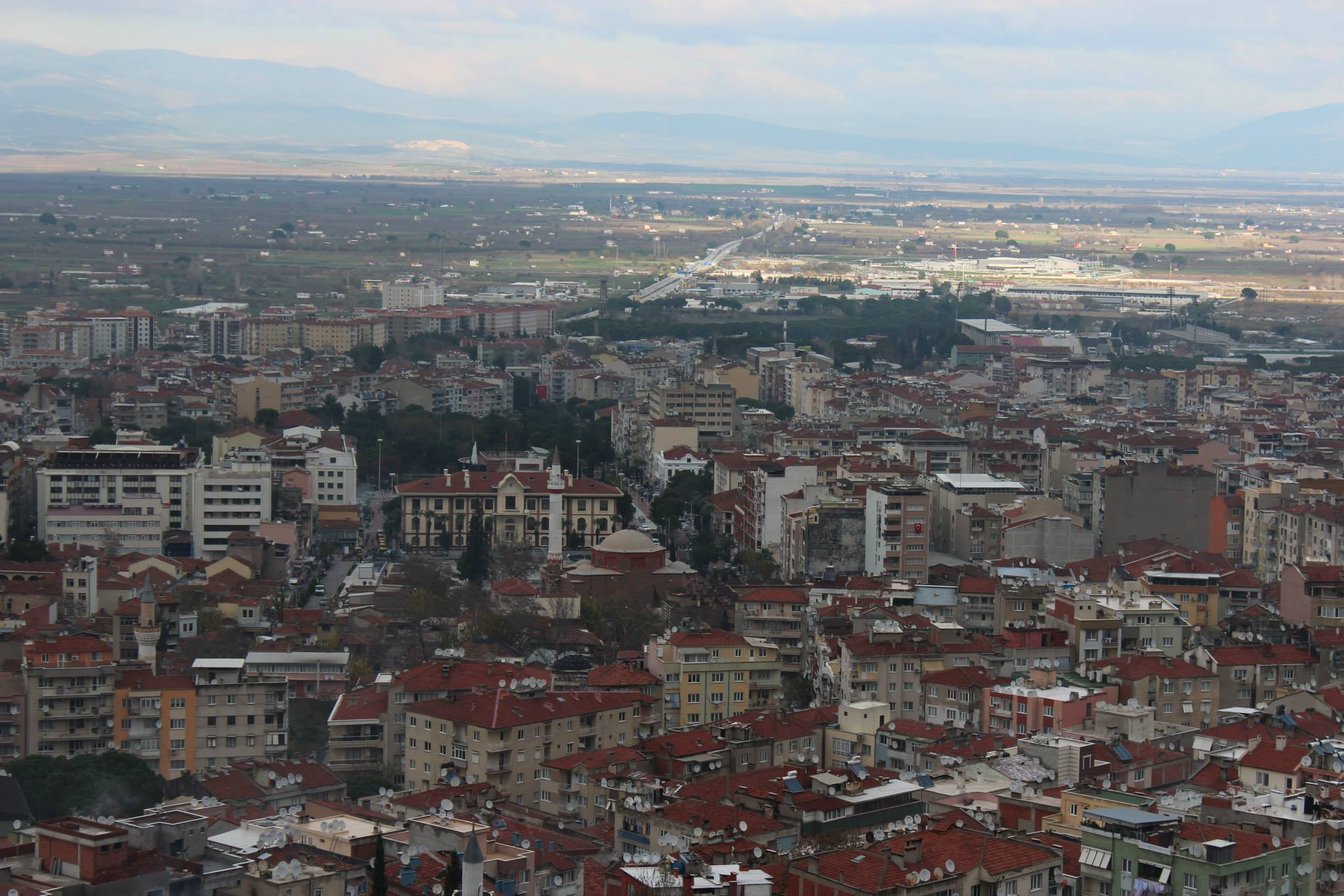
- View of Şehzadeler from Spil Mountain

- Logo

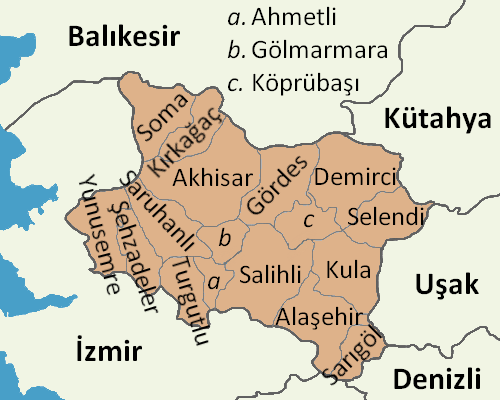
- Map showing Şehzadeler District in Manisa Province

- Location within Turkey Location within Turkey Aegean
- Coordinates: 38.6166°N 27.4386°E
- Country: Turkey
- Province: Manisa

Government
  - Mayor: Hakan Şimşek (CHP)
- Area: 515 km^{2} (199 sq mi)
- Population (2022): 167,227
  - Density: 325/km^{2} (841/sq mi)
- Time zone: UTC+3 (TRT)
- Area code: 0236
- Website: www.sehzadeler.bel.tr

Şehzadeler is a municipality and district of Manisa Province, Turkey. Its area is 515 km^{2} (199 sq mi), and its population is 167,227 (2022). It covers the eastern part of the agglomeration of Manisa and the adjacent countryside.

The district Şehzadeler was created at the 2013 reorganisation from part of the former central district of Manisa Province, along with the new district Yunusemre. Its name means "princes", referring to those princes who served as sanjak rulers in Manisa during the Ottoman Empire period.

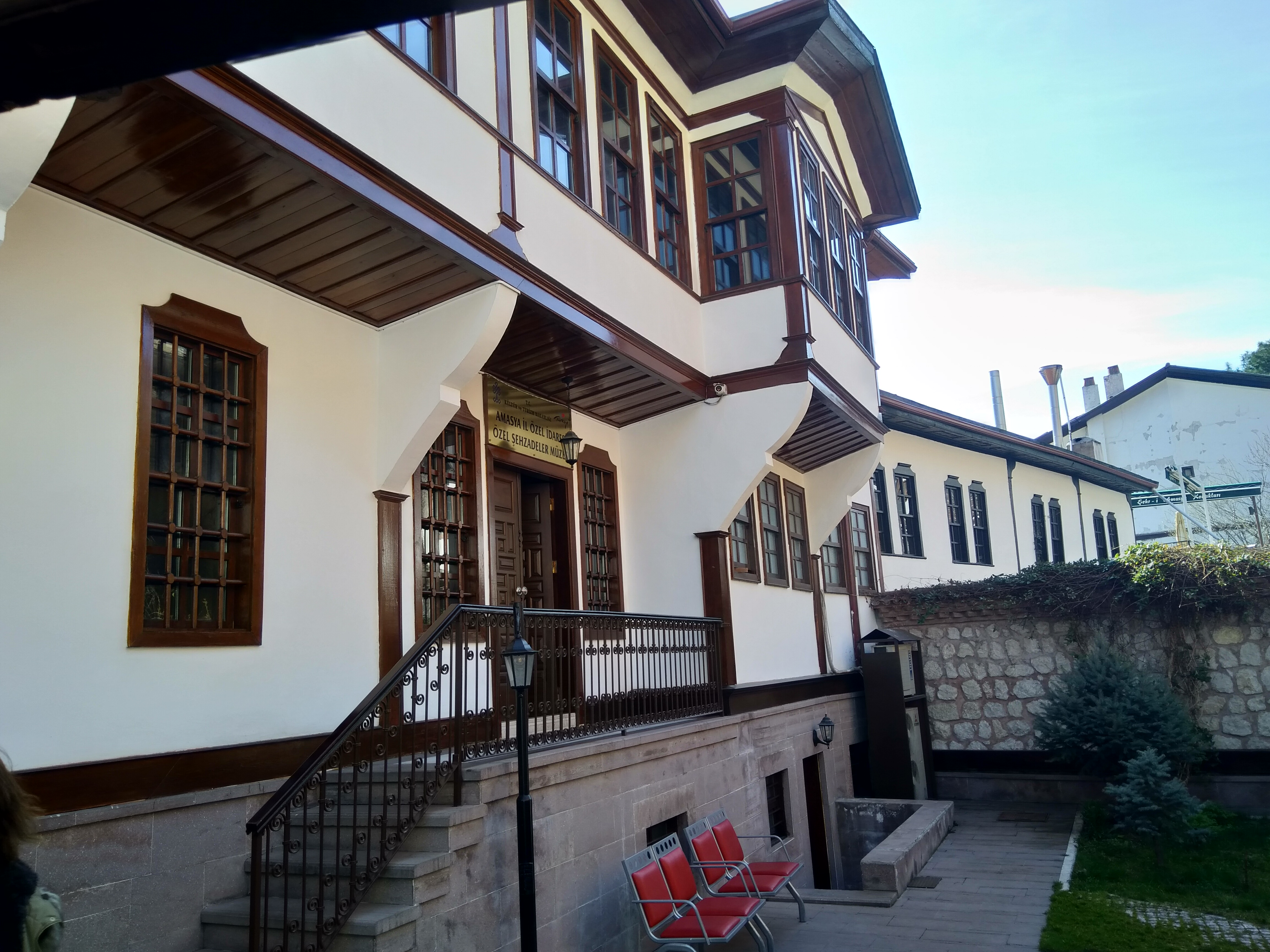
Şehzadeler Museum

== Composition ==
There are 67 neighbourhoods in Şehzadeler District:

- 1.Anafartalar
- 2.Anafartalar
- Adakale
- Adnan Menderes
- Ahmet Bedevi
- Akıncılar
- Akpınar
- Alaybey
- Arda
- Aşağıçobanisa
- Ayvacık
- Bayındırlık
- Belenyenice
- Çamköy
- Çarşı
- Çavuşoğlu
- Çerkezmahmudiye
- Çınarlıkuyu
- Dere
- Dilşeker
- Dinçer
- Ege
- Gediz
- Gökbel
- Göktaşlı
- Güzelköy
- Hacıhaliller
- Halitli
- Hamzabeyli
- İbrahimçelebi
- İshakçelebi
- Kağan
- Kaleköy
- Kalemli
- Karaağaçlı
- Karaoğlanlı
- Karayenice
- Kazımkarabekir
- Kırançiftliği
- Kocatepe
- Kuşlubahçe
- Mimarsinan
- Nişancıpaşa
- Nurlupınar
- Peker
- Sakarya
- Sancaklıbozköy
- Sancaklıçeşmebaşı
- Sancaklıiğdecik
- Sancaklıkayadibi
- Sancaklıuzunçınar
- Sarıalan
- Saruhan
- Şehitler
- Selimşahlar
- Tekeliler
- Tepecik
- Tilkisüleymaniye
- Tunca
- Turgut Özal
- Utku
- Veziroğlu
- Yarhasanlar
- Yeniharmandalı
- Yeniköy
- Yeşilköy
- Yukarıçobanisa
