= Demirci =

- District and municipality
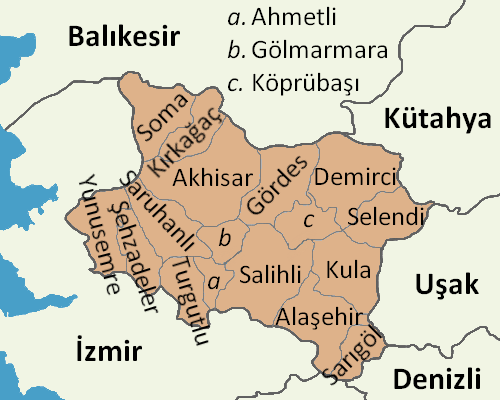
- Map showing Demirci District in Manisa Province

- Location in Turkey Demirci (Turkey Aegean)
- Coordinates: 39°02′42″N 28°39′29″E
- Country: Turkey
- Province: Manisa

Government
  - Mayor: Cahit Onar
- Area: 1,321 km^{2} (510 sq mi)
- Elevation: 853 m (2,799 ft)
- Population (2022): 36,620
  - Density: 27.72/km^{2} (71.80/sq mi)
- Time zone: UTC+3 (TRT)
- Postal code: 45900
- Area code: 0236
- Website: www.demirci.bel.tr

Demirci is a municipality and district of Manisa Province, Turkey. Its area is 1,321 km^{2}, and its population is 36,620 (2022). The town lies at an elevation of 853 m (2,799 ft).

== History ==
From 1867 until 1922, Demirci was part of the Aidin Vilayet of the Ottoman Empire. At the 2013 reorganisation, it lost part of its territory to the district of Köprübaşı.

== Composition ==
There are 101 neighbourhoods in Demirci District:

- Ahatlar
- Ahmetler
- Akdere
- Akıncılar
- Alaağaç
- Armutlu
- Ayvaalanı
- Azizbey
- Bahçeler
- Bardakçı
- Bayramşah
- Beyazıt
- Boyacık
- Bozcaatlı
- Bozköy
- Büyükkıran
- Çağıllar
- Camii Atik
- Çamköy
- Çamlıca
- Çanakçı
- Çandır
- Çardaklı
- Çataloluk
- Cumhuriyet
- Danişmentler
- Demirci
- Dr.Akarsu
- Durhasan
- Elek
- Erişler
- Esenyurt
- Eskihisar
- Fatih
- Gömeçler
- Gümele
- Gürçeşme
- Güveli
- Hacıbaba
- Hacıhamza
- Hacıhasan
- Hacıtürbek
- Hırkalı
- Hoşçalar
- Hüdük
- İçhisar
- İcikler
- Iklıkçı
- İmceler
- İmrenler
- İsmailler
- Karaisalar
- Kargınışıklar
- Kasımfakı
- Kayaköy
- Kayranokçular
- Kazancı
- Kerpiçlik
- Kılavuzlar
- Kışlak
- Köpüler
- Kovancı
- Köylüce
- Küçükkıran
- Küçükoba
- Kulalar
- Kuzayır
- Kuzuköy
- Mahmutlar
- Marmaracık
- Mezitler
- Minnetler
- Mitatpaşa
- Öksüzlü
- Ören
- Örücüler
- Pazar
- Rahmanlar
- Sağnıç
- Sayık
- Secaettin
- Şehreküstü
- Serçeler
- Sevinçler
- Sinan
- Sofular
- Söğütçük
- Talas
- Taşokçular
- Tekeler
- Teperik
- Ulacık
- Üşümüş
- Yağmur
- Yarbasan
- Yavaşlar
- Yeğenler
- Yenice
- Yeşildere
- Yeşiloba
- Yiğitler

== Economy ==
Demirci is one of the well known handmade Turkish carpet production centers in Manisa. Demirci carpets have different pattern and styles, such as "Yağcıbedir carpet" (Turkish: Yağcıbedir halısı).
