= 1982–83 Mersin İdmanyurdu season =

Mersin İdmanyurdu
1982–83 season
- President: Mehmet Fatih Deveci
- Coach: (Turkey) Gündüz Tekin Onay
- Stadium: Mersin, Turkey
- First League: 15th (relegated)
- Turkish Cup: Runners-up
- Totals: 44 (29)
- Most appearances: (Turkey) Levent Arıkdoğan (38)
- Top goalscorer: (Turkey) Sertaç Yüzbaş (8)
Home colours	Away colours	Third colours

Mersin İdmanyurdu (also Mersin İdman Yurdu, Mersin İY, or MİY) Sports Club; located in Mersin, east Mediterranean coast of Turkey in 1982–83. The 1982–83 season was the 11th season of Mersin İdmanyurdu football team in First League, the first level division in Turkey. The team was promoted to first division last season for the fourth time.

President Mehmet Fatih Deveci has transferred two famous players from Fenerbahçe (Paşa Hüseyin and İsa), and Bursaspor's former manager Gündüz Tekin Onay. General Captain was Remon Kumdereli. The club address was: "Yaşat İşhanı K: 3. Mersin. Tel: 15317". Manager Gündüz Tekin Onay suffered from gastrointestinal bleeding; and his assistant Erhan Dodanlı coached the team from 22nd through 25th round.

In the first half of the season the team was successful. However, in the second half they could not score goals and they have relegated to second division at the end of the season. It was fourth time the team relegated.

In Turkish Cup they played finals and lost against Fenerbahçe. Since Fenerbahçe also won the league title MİY represented Turkey in CWC (Cup Winners Cup) in next season. MİY became the first team who became eligible to represent Turkey in a European cup and relegated to second league (the other team was Kayseri Erciyesspor). Ironically, as MİY relegated and could not have promoted again to first league, Fenerbahçe could not have won again the Turkish Cup (until 2010).

== Pre-season ==
MİY prepared to the season at Uludağ. Later played some away games. Before the start of the season MİY attended in a tournament (TSYD Cup) in Ankara.

- 1 August 1982 – Sakaryaspor-MİY: 2–0. Goals: B.Turgay 6', Yenal 67'(H). Adapazarı. Sakaryaspor's and Fenerbahçe's former player Zafer's jubilee match.
- 4 August 1982 – Eskişehirspor-MİY: 1–0.
- 8 August 1982 – Konyaspor-MİY: 1–2.
- 14 August 1982 – MİY-Bursaspor: 0–0; 6–5. penalties. TSYD Kupası, Ankara. Saturday 16:00. MİY: Goals: B.Cevat, İsa, Metin, Tahir, Rıdvan, Nasır. Bursaspor: Goals: Sedat, Beyhan, Karaliç, Erdinç, İsa. With this score MİY promoted to finals of the cup. The other game was played between Ankaragücü and Zonguldakspor at 18:00 same day. On second day, winners of the first day played for the cup while the losers played for third place.
- 23 August 1982 – Adana Demirspor-MİY: 3–1.

== 1982–83 First League participation ==
MİY attended First League (top level division in Turkey) in 1982–83 season. At the end of the season MİY was relegated to Second League by goal average and number of goals (lower than that of Antalyaspor). First team qualified for Champion Clubs' Cup, second for UEFA Cup. MİY became the first club in Turkey which qualified for a European Cup and relegated to second division in Turkey.

=== Results summary ===
Mersin İdmanyurdu (MİY) 1982–83 First League summary:

	Overall									Home								Away							
Stage	Pc	Pl	W	D	L	GF	GA	GD	Pt	Pl	W	D	L	GF	GA	GD	Pt	Pl	W	D	L	GF	GA	GD	Pt
First half	8	17	6	5	6	12	14	−2	17	9	5	4	0	7	1	+6	14	8	1	1	6	5	13	−8	3
Second half		17	4	4	9	7	18	−11	12	8	4	4	0	5	0	+5	12	9	0	0	9	2	18	−16	0
Overall	15	34	10	9	15	19	32	−13	29	17	9	8	0	12	1	+11	26	17	1	1	15	7	31	−24	3

Sources: 1982–83 Turkish First Football League pages.

=== League table ===
MİY's performance in First League 1982–83 season is shown in the table below:

Pos	Team	Pld	W	D	L	GF	GA	GD	Pts	Qualification or relegation
13	Zonguldakspor	34	9	12	13	31	35	−4	30	
14	Antalyaspor	34	9	11	14	27	40	−13	29	
15	Mersin İdman Yurdu (R)	34	10	9	15	19	32	−13	29	Cup Winners' Cup and relegation to Turkish Second Football League
16	Samsunspor (R)	34	10	8	16	37	49	−12	28	Relegation to Second Football League
17	Gaziantepspor (R)	34	9	9	16	23	35	−12	27	Relegation to Second Football League

Rules for classification: 1) points; 2) goal difference; 3) number of goals scored.
(R) Relegated

=== Results by round ===
Results of games MİY played in 1982–83 First League by rounds:

Round	1	2	3	4	5	6	7	8	9	10	11	12	13	14	15	16	17	18	19	20	21	22	23	24	25	26	27	28	29	30	31	32	33	34
Ground	A	H	A	A	H	A	H	A	H	H	A	A	H	H	H	H	A	H	H	H	A	H	A	H	A	A	A	H	H	A	A	A	A	H
Result	L	D	D	W	W	L	D	L	W	W	L	L	W	D	D	W	L	W	W	D	L	W	L	D	L	L	L	D	D	L	L	L	L	W
Position	15	13	13	10	7	8	9	11	9	7	8	11	8	9	9	8	8	7	6	6	6	6	6	7	10	12	12	12	11	12	13	14	16	15

Source: 1982–83 Turkish First Football League pages.
A = Away; H = Home; W = Win; D = Draw; L = Loss

=== First half ===
28 August 1982 Round 1	Galatasaray	1–0	Mersin İdmanyurdu	Ali Sami Yen Stadium, Istanbul
Saturday, 17:30	Mirza Sejdiç 18'	Report	(yellow card) 38' Hüseyin Çelik; (yellow card) 77' Mustafa Çimen	Attendance: 27.968; Referee: Talat Tokat

12 September 1982 Round 2	Mersin İdmanyurdu	0–0	Zonguldakspor	Tevfik Sırrı Gür Stadium, Mersin
Sunday, 15:30	Tahir Temur (yellow card) 69'; Mehmet Ali Karakuş (yellow card) 83'	Report	(yellow card) 19' Volkan Yayın; (yellow card) 55' Yaşar Yiğit; (yellow card) 89' Turgut Öndül	Referee: Yavuz Karaozan

19 September 1982 Round 3	Antalyaspor	1–1	Mersin İdmanyurdu	Atatürk Stadium, Antalya
Sunday, 15:30	Oral Yenigün 10'	Report	20' Zafer Altındağ; (yellow card) 44' Atıf Öztoprak; (yellow card) 81' Mehmet Ali Karakuş	Attendance: 10.000; Referee: Abdülkadir Aypek

26 September 1982 Round 4	Altay	1–2	Mersin İdmanyurdu	Alsancak Stadium, İzmir
Sunday, 15:30	Erdi Demir 85'	Report	52' Sertaç Yüzbaş; 77' Memik Ertanıroğlu; (yellow card) 80' Hüseyin Çelik	Referee: Reşit Çeker

3 October 1982 Round 5	Mersin İdmanyurdu	1–0	Boluspor	Tevfik Sırrı Gür Stadium, Mersin
Sunday, 15:30	Levent Arıkdoğan 44' (pen.); Mehmet Ali Karakuş (yellow card) 65'	Report; Milliyet report	(yellow card) 79' İbrahim Desticioğlu	Referee: Kazım Ünlüsoy

10 October 1982 Round 6	Bursaspor	1–0	Mersin İdmanyurdu	Atatürk Stadium, Bursa
Sunday, 15:30	Kadir Çattık 9'; Sinan Bür (yellow card) 23'; Kadir Çattık (yellow card) 55'; Beyhan Çalışkan (yellow card) 68'	Report	(yellow card) 34' Memik Ertanıroğlu; (yellow card) 60' İsa Ertürk	Referee: Coşkun Evin

17 October 1982 Round 7	Mersin İdmanyurdu	1–1	Sakaryaspor	Tevfik Sırrı Gür Stadium, Mersin
Sunday, 15:30	Memik Ertanıroğlu 7'	Report	63' Şenol Çorlu; (yellow card) 76' Şenol Çorlu	Referee: Hamza Alan

24 October 1982 Round 8	MKE Ankaragücü	3–2	Mersin İdmanyurdu	19 Mayıs Stadium, Ankara
Sunday, 15:30	Halil İbrahim Eren 14'; Nazmi Erdenerin 55'; Bülent İzgiş 66'	Report	75' Zafer Altındağ; 82' Sertaç Yüzbaş	Referee: Özcan Oal

31 October 1982 Round 9	Mersin İdmanyurdu	1–0	Adana Demirspor	Tevfik Sırrı Gür Stadium, Mersin
Sunday, 14:45	İsa Ertürk 31' (F)	Report		Referee: İbrahim Acar

21 November 1982 Round 10	Mersin İdmanyurdu	1–0	Beşiktaş	Tevfik Sırrı Gür Stadium, Mersin
Sunday, 14:00	Haluk Turfan 23'; Hüseyin Çelik (yellow card) 29'; Mehmet Ali Karakuş (yellow card) 57' (red card)	Report	(penalty missed) Ziya Doğan	Attendance: 22.000; Referee: İhsan Türe

28 November 1982 Round 11	Gaziantepspor	2–0	Mersin İdmanyurdu	Kamil Ocak Stadium, Gaziantep
Sunday, 14:00	Osman Yılmaz 25'; Ahmet Yılmaz 49'; Bünyamin Süral (yellow card) 78'	Report	(yellow card) 36' İsa Ertürk	Attendance: 9150; Referee: Erdal Fırat

5 December 1982 Round 12	Kocaelispor	2–0	Mersin İdmanyurdu	İsmet Paşa Stadium, İzmit, Kocaeli
Sunday, 14:00	Orhan Görsen 2'; Ayhan Akbin 78'	Report	(yellow card) 87' Levent Arıkdoğan	Referee: Necmi Temizel

12 December 1982 Round 13	Mersin İdmanyurdu	1–0	Adanaspor	Tevfik Sırrı Gür Stadium, Mersin
Sunday, 14:00	Memik Ertanıroğlu 24'; Rıdvan Kılıç (yellow card) 75'; Atıf Öztoprak (yellow card) 86'	Report	(yellow card) 64' Feyzullah Küçük	Referee: Celal Türk

19 December 1982 Round 14	Mersin İdmanyurdu	0–0	Fenerbahçe	Tevfik Sırrı Gür Stadium, Mersin
Sunday, 13:30	Memik Ertanıroğlu (yellow card) 60'	Report		Attendance: 22.000; Referee: İbrahim Acar

26 December 1982 Round 15	Mersin İdmanyurdu	0–0	Trabzonspor	Tevfik Sırrı Gür Stadium, Mersin
Sunday, 13:30	İsa Ertürk (yellow card) 10'; Mehmet Ali Karakuş (yellow card) 80'	Report	(yellow card) 15' Osman Şahinoğlu	Attendance: 12.000; Referee: Yahya Diker

2 January 1983 Round 16	Mersin İdmanyurdu	2–0	Sarıyer	Tevfik Sırrı Gür Stadium, Mersin
Sunday, 13:30	Levent Arıkdoğan 75' (F); İsa Ertürk 88' (F); Hüseyin Çelik (yellow card) 56'; Sertaç Yüzbaş (yellow card) 69'	Report	(yellow card) 56'[Rıfkı Soysal; (yellow card) 62' Mehmet Kalkavan; (yellow card) 75' (red card) Sedat Tatlısöz	Referee: Hasan Ceylan

9 January 1983 Round 17	Samsunspor	2–0	Mersin İdmanyurdu	Tevfik Sırrı Gür Stadium, Mersin
Sunday, 13:30	Tanju Çolak 16'; Eyüp Gümüş 32'; Eyüp Gümüş (yellow card) 32'	Report	(yellow card) 62' Atıf Öztoprak	Attendance: 8000; Referee: Coşkun Kutay

=== Mid-season ===
Mid-season preparation games:

- 30 January 1983 – Adana Demirspor-MİY: 1–1.
- 13 February 1983 – MİY-Adana Demirspor: 0–1.

=== Second half ===
20 February 1983 Round 18	Mersin İdmanyurdu	2–0	Galatasaray	Tevfik Sırrı Gür Stadium, Mersin
Sunday, 14:00	Sertaç Yüzbaş 33' (H); Memik Ertanıroğlu 75' (F); İsa Ertürk (yellow card) 58'; Levent Dörtgöz (yellow card) 81'	Report		Referee: Erdoğdu Diyadin

3 March 1983 Round 19	Mersin İdmanyurdu	1–0	Antalyaspor	Tevfik Sırrı Gür Stadium, Mersin
Sunday, 15:00	Zafer Altındağ 75'	Report	(yellow card) 27' Akgün Çolakoğlu; (yellow card) 80' Bekir Şarlak	Referee: Özer Kızıltan

13 March 1983 Round 20	Mersin İdmanyurdu	0–0	Altay	Tevfik Sırrı Gür Stadium, Mersin
Sunday, 16:30	Tahir Temur (yellow card) 27'	Report		Attendance: 12.000; Referee: İbrahim Acar

20 March 1983 Round 21	Boluspor	1–0	Mersin İdmanyurdu	Bolu Atatürk Stadium, Bolu
Sunday, 15:00	Sercan Görgülü 81'; Nuri Artış (yellow card) 68'	Report	(yellow card) 44' Tahir Temur; (yellow card) 60' İsa Ertürk	Referee: Ali İhsan Papatya

26 March 1983 Round 22	Mersin İdmanyurdu	1–0	Bursaspor	Tevfik Sırrı Gür Stadium, Mersin
Saturday, 14:30	Haluk Turfan 61'; Rıdvan Kılıç (yellow card) 81' (red card)	Report	(yellow card) 39' Kadir Çattık; (yellow card) 58' Semih Yuvakuran; (yellow card) 63' Suat Karaliç; (red card) 81' Erdinç Kayan	Attendance: 11.000; Referee: Celal Türk

3 April 1983 Round 23	Sakaryaspor	2–1	Mersin İdmanyurdu	Atatürk Stadium, Adapazarı, Sakarya
Sunday, 15:00	Ahmet Kılıç 17'; Ahmet Kılıç 32'	Report	29' Sertaç Yüzbaş	Attendance: 6000; Referee: Osman Erdal Fırat

10 April 1983 Round 24	Mersin İdmanyurdu	0–0	MKE Ankaragücü	Tevfik Sırrı Gür Stadium, Mersin
Sunday, 15:00	Hüseyin Çelik (yellow card) 48'	Report	(yellow card) 77' Hüsnü Özkara	Attendance: 17.000; Referee: Yusuf Namoğlu

17 April 1983 Round 25	Adana Demirspor	1–0	Mersin İdmanyurdu	5 Ocak Stadium, Adana
Sunday, 15:00	Müjdat Karanfilci 22'	Report	(yellow card) 51' Mehmet Ali Karakuş; (yellow card) 68' Rıdvan Kılıç	Referee: Onur Sorguç

27 April 1983 Round 26	Beşiktaş	3–0	Mersin İdmanyurdu	İnönü Stadium, Istanbul
Wednesday, 15:00	Bora Öztürk 2' (F); Bora Öztürk 61' (F); Bora Öztürk 75' (F)	Report	(yellow card) 77' Tahir Temur	Attendance: 6995; Referee: Celal Türk

1 May 1983 Round 27	Zonguldakspor	2–1	Mersin İdmanyurdu	Kara Elmas Stadium, Zonguldak
Sunday, 15:00	Ümit Kandemir 43'; Muammer Birdal 62'; Muammer Birdal (yellow card) 84'	Report	20' Haluk Turfan; (yellow card) 36' Haluk Turfan	Referee: Yusuf Namoğlu

7 May 1983 Round 28	Mersin İdmanyurdu	0–0	Gaziantepspor	Tevfik Sırrı Gür Stadium, Mersin
Saturday, 15:30	İsa Ertürk (yellow card) 27'	Report	(yellow card) 56' Ömer Erkorkmaz; (yellow card) 69' Bünyamin Süral; (yellow card) 87' Hüseyin Çakıroğlu	Referee: Necmi Temizel

15 May 1983 Round 29	Mersin İdmanyurdu	0–0	Kocaelispor	Tevfik Sırrı Gür Stadium, Mersin
Sunday, 16:00		Report		Referee: Coşkun Kutay

22 May 1983 Round 30	Adanaspor	2–0	Mersin İdmanyurdu	5 Ocak Stadium, Adana
Sunday, 16:00	Kayhan Kaynak 32'; İsmail Akbaşlı 86'	Report		Referee: Coşkun Evin

29 May 1983 Round 31	Fenerbahçe	3–0	Mersin İdmanyurdu	Fenerbahçe Stadium, Istanbul
Sunday, 16:00	Selçuk Yula 14' (F); Selçuk Yula 38' (H); Zafer Dinçer 38' (F); Erdoğan Arıca (yellow card) 51'	Report		Attendance: 25.000; Referee: İbrahim Acar

5 June 1983 Round 32	Trabzonspor	1–0	Mersin İdmanyurdu	Hüseyin Avni Aker Stadium, Trabzon
Sunday, 16:00	Levent Erköse 69' (H)	Report		Attendance: 3000; Referee: Erkan Göksel

12 June 1983 Round 33	Sarıyer	3–0	Mersin İdmanyurdu	Fenerbahçe Stadium, Istanbul
Sunday, 16:00	Smail Spahic 67'; Smail Spahic 70'; Smail Spahic 74'	Report	(red card) 71' Hüseyin Çelik	Attendance: 8000; Referee: İbrahim Acar

19 June 1983 Round 34	Mersin İdmanyurdu	1–0	Samsunspor	Tevfik Sırrı Gür Stadium, Mersin
Sunday, 16:00	Memik Ertanıroğlu 88' (F)	Report		Attendance: 16.000; Referee: Talat Tokat

== 1982–83 Turkish Cup participation ==
1982–83 Turkish Cup was played for the 21st season as Federasyon Kupası by 186 teams. Six elimination rounds and finals were played in two-legs elimination system. Mersin İdmanyurdu participated in 1982–83 Turkish Cup from round 5 and was eliminated at Finals (1/2) by Fenerbahçe. Fenerbahçe won the Cup for the 4th time. Because cup winner Fenerbahçe also won the league title, Mersin İdmanyurdu was qualified for 1983–84 European Cup Winners' Cup.

=== Cup track ===
The drawings and results Mersin İdmanyurdu (MİY) followed in 1982–83 Turkish Cup are shown in the following table.

Round	Own League	Opponent's League	Opponent	A	H	Result
Round 5	First League	Second League Group B	Göztepe	1–0	2–1	Promoted to R6
Round 6	First League	First League	Bursaspor	0–0	2–1	Promoted to QF
QF	First League	First League	Sarıyer	1–0	1–1	Promoted to SF
SF	First League	First League	Trabzonspor	1–1	1–0	Promoted to F
F	First League	First League	Fenerbahçe	0–2	1–2	Eligible for ECWC

Note: In the above table 'Score' shows For and Against goals whether the match played at home or not.

=== Game details ===
Mersin İdmanyurdu (MİY) 1982–83 Turkish Cup game reports is shown in the following table. Kick off times are in EET and EEST.

23 February 1983 R5 L1	Göztepe	0–1	Mersin İdmanyurdu	Alsancak Stadium, İzmir
Wednesday, 14:00		Report	8' İsa Ertürk; (yellow card) 69' (red card) Mahmet Ali Karakuş	Referee: Hamdi Kutval

16 March 1983 R5 L2	Mersin İdmanyurdu	2–1	Göztepe	Tevfik Sırrı Gür Stadium, Mersin
Wednesday, 14:00	Sertaç Yüzbaş 54'; Levent Dörtgöz 73'	Report	37' (H) Kemal Yılmaz	Referee: Sedat Kant

23 March 1983 R6 L1	Bursaspor	0–0	Mersin İdmanyurdu	Atatürk Stadium, Bursa
Wednesday, 15:00	Kadir Çattık (yellow card) 61'	Report	(yellow card) 75' Tahir Temur	Referee: Cumhur Demir

6 April 1983 R6 L2	Mersin İdmanyurdu	2–1	Bursaspor	Tevfik Sırrı Gür Stadium, Mersin
Wednesday, 15:00	Mehmet Ertanıroğlu 24'; Mehmet Ali Karakuş 78'; Mehmet Ali Karakuş (yellow card) 54'	Report	58' İsa Gabralı; (yellow card) 22' Altan Güney; (yellow card) 30' (red card) Ahmet Yılmaz; (yellow card) 41' Minas Asa; (yellow card) 69' Ali Aköz	Referee: Yalçın Gümüşkaya

23 March 1983 QF L1	Sarıyer	0–1	Mersin İdmanyurdu	İnönü Stadium, Istanbul
Wednesday, 16:00	Engin Ülker (yellow card) 44'; Hayri Ülgen (yellow card) 47'	Report	23' Sertaç Yüzbaş; (yellow card) 47' Tahir Temur; (yellow card) 83' İsa Ertürk	Attendance: 2.000; Referee: Kazım Ünlüsoy

18 May 1983 QF L2	Mersin İdmanyurdu	1–1	Sarıyer	Tevfik Sırrı Gür Stadium, Mersin
Wednesday, 16:00	Levent Arıkdoğan 2' (pen.); Mustafa Çimen (yellow card) 59'	Report; Milliyet report	75' Rıfkı Soysal; (yellow card) 44' Mehmet Kalkavan; (yellow card) 59' Sead Čelebić	Referee: Cemal Türk

25 May 1983 SF L1	Trabzonspor	1–1	Mersin İdmanyurdu	Hüseyin Avni Aker Stadium, Trabzon
Wednesday, 16:00	Gökhan Ersoy 49'	Report	13' Sertaç Yüzbaş; (yellow card) 84' Mehmet Ertanıroğlu; (yellow card) 86' Mehmet Ali Karakuş	Attendance: 5.000; Referee: Coşkun Kutay

1 June 1983 SF L2	Mersin İdmanyurdu	1–0	Trabzonspor	Tevfik Sırrı Gür Stadium, Mersin
Wednesday, 16:00	Haluk Turfan 5' (H)	Report	(red card) 60' Bahattin Güneş; (yellow card) 71' İskender Günen; (yellow card) 77' Turgay Semercioğlu	Attendance: 5.000; Referee: Cumhur Demir

8 June 1983 F L1	Fenerbahçe	2–0	Mersin İdmanyurdu	Fenerbahçe Stadium, Istanbul
Wednesday, 16:00	Selçuk Yula 19' (H); Mehmet Hacıoğlu 29'	Report	(yellow card) 76' Nasır Belci; (yellow card) 76' İsa Ertürk	Referee: Necmi Temizel

15 June 1983 F L2	Mersin İdmanyurdu	1–2	Fenerbahçe	Tevfik Sırrı Gür Stadium, Mersin
Wednesday, 16:00	Sertaç Yüzbaş 59' (H); Metin Koyuncuoğlu (yellow card) 48'	Report	16' Selçuk Yula; 20' Mustafa Arabacıbaşı	Attendance: 16.000; Referee: Sadık Deda

Source: 1982–83 Turkish Cup (Federasyon Kupası) pages.

== Management ==
=== Club management ===
Mehmet Fatih Deveci was club president.

=== Coaching team ===
1982–83 Mersin İdmanyurdu head coaches:

Nat	Head coach	Period	Pl	W	D	L	Notes
(Turkey)		01.08.1982 – 31.05.1983					

Note: Only official games were included.

== 1982–83 squad ==
O	N	Nat	Name	Birth	Born	Pos	LA	LG	CA	CG	TA	TG	Booked	Sent off (straight red)	← Season Notes →
1	1	(Turkey)	Atıf Öztoprak	8 May 1952	Sakarya	GK	32		8		40		3		→ previous season.
2	2	(Turkey)	Rıdvan Kılıç	25 Nov 1955	Adana	DF	20		3		23		3	1	1982 ST A.Demirspor.
3	3	(Turkey)	Nasır Belci	1 Dec 1955	Adana	DF	17		7		24		1		→ previous season.
4	4	(Turkey)	Mustafa Çimen	1952	Erdek	DF	14		8		22		2		→ previous season.
5	5	(Turkey)	Hüseyin Çelik	1955	Polatlı	DF	27		7		34		5	1	1982 ST Fenerbahçe.
6	6	(Turkey)	Tahir Temur	1 Jan 1954	Istanbul	DF	32		9		41		6		→ previous season.
7	7	(Turkey)	Levent Dörtgöz	1 Jan 1958	Ankara	MF	28		9	1	37	1	1		→ previous season.
8	8	(Turkey)	Sertaç Yüzbaş	20 Mar 1958	Adana	MF	31	4	10	4	41	8	1		1982 ST Ankaragücü.
9	9	(Turkey)	İsa Ertürk	17 Jul 1955	Ankara	MF	31	2	10	1	41	3	8		1982 ST Fenerbahçe.
10	10	(Turkey)	Metin Koyuncuoğlu	24 Nov 1960	Diyarbakır	MF	31		8		39		1		1982 ST Diyarbakırspor.
11	11	(Turkey)	Zafer Altındağ	23 Mar 1957	Manisa	FW	20	3	5		25	3			1982 ST Kayserispor.
12	12	(Turkey)	Özcan Balta	1964	Mersin	GK									→ previous season.
13	13	(Turkey)	Haluk Turfan	22 Jan 1964	Mersin	FW	28	3	10	1	38	4	1		→ previous season.
14	14	(Turkey)	Metin Aydın	4 Jul 1963	Istanbul	MF	4		2		6				1982 ST Düzcespor.
15	15	(Turkey)	Cengiz			FW									
16	7	(Turkey)	Levent Arıkdoğan	23 Aug 1953	Mersin	MF	33	2	10	1	43	3	1		→ previous season.
17	10	(Turkey)	Mehmet Ali Karakuş	25 Nov 1957	İliç	FW	27		8	1	35	1	9	2	→ previous season.
18	13	(Turkey)	Orhan												
18	14	(Turkey)	Asım												
19	15	(Turkey)	Ömer Tekkazanç	4 Aug 1961	Adana	MF	3				3				
20	14	(Turkey)	Mehmet Ertanıroğlu	15 May 1960	Tarsus	FW	22	5	5	1	27	6	3		→ previous season.
21	15	(Turkey)	Çimen												
		(Turkey)	Salih Sayar	25 May 1957	Istanbul	GK					2				
		(Turkey)	İsmail Özçelik	8 Aug 1958	Akçaabat	DF									
		(Turkey)	Mustafa Akarcalı	1 Jan 1954	Biga	MF					9				loan from Sakaryaspor.
		(Turkey)	Vedat Uysal	30 Nov 1962	Istanbul	MF					1				

Note: Player stats in the above table count for league matches only.

== See also ==
- Football in Turkey
- 1982–83 Turkish First Football League
- 1982–83 Turkish Cup
