= 1981–82 Mersin İdmanyurdu season =

Mersin İdmanyurdu
1981–82 season
- President: Mehmet Fatih Deveci
- Coach: (Turkey) Candan Dumanlı
- Stadium: Mersin, Turkey
- Second League: Group C: 1st
- Turkish Cup: Eliminated at R6
- Top goalscorer: Sertaç Yüzbaş (10)
Home colours	Away colours	Third colours

Mersin İdmanyurdu (also Mersin İdman Yurdu, Mersin İY, or MİY) Sports Club; located in Mersin, east Mediterranean coast of Turkey in 1981–82. At the end of 1981–82 season Mersin İdmanyurdu has promoted to First League for the fourth time. The 1981–82 was the eighth season of Mersin İdmanyurdu (MİY) football team in Second League, the second level division in Turkey. They finished 1st in Group C.

Mersin İdmanyurdu Executive Committee was consisting of the following: Mehmet Fatih Deveci (president), Mahir Turan and Mustafa Nihat Sözmen (vice-presidents), Remon Kumdereli (general captain), Mircan Fırat (general secretary), Hamit Hayfavi (audit), Mehmet Biricik (captain of amateur branches), Şefik Balcı (treasurer), Aydın Özlü (club physician), Sever Yıldızçelik, Ramazan Balta, Özge Cadun, Basil Dumani, Nesimi Sağay and Erol Tarhan (members). The club's address was: "Atatürk Cad. Toros Ofis İşhanı, Kat: 3 Mersin" "Telefon: 153 17".

Candan Dumanlı became the head coach. His assistant was Kahraman Karataş. İlhami Özata was press officer.

== Pre-season ==
Preparation games:

- MİY – Hatayspor: 0–0.
- MİY – Adana Demirspor: 1–1.
- MİY – Ceyhanspor: 3–1.
- 16.08.1981 - İskenderunspor – MİY: 0–2.

== 1981–82 Second League participation ==
In its 19th season (1981–82) Second League was played with 60 teams, 15 in four groups: Group A, Group B, Group C and Group D. Group winners promoted to First League 1982–83. Bottom teams in each group relegated to promotion league (Third league was abandoned previous year). Mersin İY became 1st with 21 wins and 46 goals in Group C. No second league championship game played starting from 1980–81.

=== Results summary ===
Mersin İdmanyurdu (MİY) 1981–82 Second League Group C league summary:

	Overall									Home								Away							
Stage	Pc	Pl	W	D	L	GF	GA	GD	Pt	Pl	W	D	L	GF	GA	GD	Pt	Pl	W	D	L	GF	GA	GD	Pt
First half	1	14	10	3	1	27	7	+20	23	7	6	1	0	19	3	+16	13	7	4	2	1	8	4	+4	10
Second half		14	11	2	1	19	4	+15	24	7	7	0	0	13	2	+11	14	7	4	2	1	6	2	+4	10
Overall	1	28	21	5	2	46	11	+35	47	14	13	1	0	32	5	+27	27	14	8	4	2	14	6	+8	20

Sources: 1981–82 Turkish Second Football League pages.

=== League table ===
Mersin İY's league performance in Second League Group C in 1981–82 season is shown in the following table.

Pc	Team	Games				Goals		Pts	Home			Away		
Pc	Team	Pl	W	D	L	F	A	Pts	F–A	R	Pc	F–A	R	Pc
1	Mersin İdmanyurdu (C) (P)	28	21	5	2	46	11	47	–	12	2	–	27	1
2	Kayserispor	28	20	5	3	60	17	45	2–1	13	1	0–1	28	2
3	Gençlerbirliği	28	12	9	7	32	24	33	1–0	24	1	0–0	9	1
4	Konyaspor	28	9	13	6	28	25	31	0–0	10	1	1–0	25	1
5	Burdurspor	28	7	12	9	21	21	26	4–1	4	1	1–0	19	1
6	Urfaspor	28	8	10	10	25	28	26	2–1	8	1	0–0	23	1
7	Ispartaspor	28	10	6	12	31	35	26	3–0	15	1	2–1	30	1
8	Hatayspor	28	7	12	9	24	29	26	3–1	18	1	2–1	3	1
9	İskenderunspor	28	7	12	9	25	31	26	1–0	22	1	1–1	7	1
10	Ceyhanspor	28	8	10	10	22	31	26	1–0	26	1	2–0	11	1
11	Ankara Demirspor	28	6	13	9	23	29	25	2–0	16	1	2–1	1	3
12	Mardinspor	28	7	9	12	23	30	23	2–1	20	1	0–1	5	1
13	Malatyaspor	28	7	8	13	27	34	22	3–0	29	1	1–0	14	1
14	Tarsus İdmanyurdu	28	7	7	14	21	33	21	2–0	2	1	2–0	17	1
15	Elazığspor (R)	28	2	13	13	14	44	17	6–0	6	1	0–0	21	1

Note: Won, drawn and lost points are 2, 1 and 0. F belongs to MİY and A belongs to corresponding team for both home and away matches.

=== Results by round ===
Results of games MİY played in 1981–82 Second League Group C by rounds:

Round	1	2	3	4	5	6	7	8	9	10	11	12	13	14	15	16	17	18	19	20	21	22	23	24	25	26	27	28	29	30
Ground	A	H	A	H	A	H	A	H	A	H	A	B	H	A	H	H	A	H	A	H	A	H	A	H	A	H	B	A	H	A
Result	W	W	W	W	L	W	D	W	D	D	W		W	W	W	W	W	W	W	W	D	W	D	W	W	W		L	W	W
Position	3	1	1	1	1	1	1	1	1	1	1	2	1	1	1	1	1	1	1	1	1	1	1	1	1	1	1	2	1	1

Source: 1981–82 Turkish Second Football League pages.
A = Away; H = Home; B = Bye; W = Win; D = Draw; L = Loss

=== First half ===
23 August 1981 Round 1	Ankara Demirspor	1 – 2	Mersin İdmanyurdu	19 Mayıs Stadium, Ankara
Sunday, 16:30	Goal	Report	62' Sertaç Yüzbaş	Referee: Özcan Oal

30 August 1981 Round 2	Mersin İdmanyurdu	2 – 0	Tarsus İdmanyurdu	Tevfik Sırrı Gür Stadium, Mersin
Sunday		Report

6 September 1981 Round 3	Hatayspor	1 – 2	Mersin İdmanyurdu	Atatürk Stadium, Antakya, Hatay
Sunday		Report

13 September 1981 Round 4	Mersin İdmanyurdu	4 – 1	Burdurspor	Tevfik Sırrı Gür Stadium, Mersin
Sunday		Report

20 September 1981 Round 5	Mardinspor	1 – 0	Mersin İdmanyurdu	City Stadium, Mardin
Sunday, 16:30		Report

27 September 1981 Round 6	Mersin İdmanyurdu	6 – 0	Elazığspor	Tevfik Sırrı Gür Stadium, Mersin
Sunday		Report		Referee: Teoman Parer

4 October 1981 Round 7	İskenderunspor	1 – 1	Mersin İdmanyurdu	City Stadium, İskenderun, Hatay
Sunday		Report

11 October 1981 Round 8	Mersin İdmanyurdu	2 – 1	Urfaspor	Tevfik Sırrı Gür Stadium, Mersin
Sunday		Report

18 October 1981 Round 9	Gençlerbirliği	0 – 0	Mersin İdmanyurdu	19 Mayıs Stadium, Ankara
Sunday		Report		Referee: Haşim Gökay

1 November 1981 Round 10	Mersin İdmanyurdu	0 – 0	Konyaspor	Tevfik Sırrı Gür Stadium, Mersin
Sunday		Report

15 November 1981 Round 11	Ceyhanspor	0 – 2	Mersin İdmanyurdu	City Stadium, Ceyhan, Adana
Sunday		Report

28 November 1981 Round 12	Mersin İdmanyurdu	v	BYE
Sunday

13 December 1981 Round 13	Mersin İdmanyurdu	2 – 1	Kayserispor	Tevfik Sırrı Gür Stadium, Mersin
Sunday		Report

20 December 1981 Round 14	Malatyaspor	0 – 1	Mersin İdmanyurdu	İnönü Stadium, Malatya
Sunday		Report

27 December 1981 Round 15	Mersin İdmanyurdu	3 – 0	Ispartaspor	Tevfik Sırrı Gür Stadium, Mersin
Sunday		Report

=== Mid-season ===
Preparation games:

- 24.01.1982 - MİY-Sakaryaspor.
- 31.01.1982 - MİY-Beşiktaş: 2-0.

=== Second half ===
28 February 1982 Round 16	Mersin İdmanyurdu	2 – 0	Ankara Demirspor	Tevfik Sırrı Gür Stadium, Mersin
Sunday		Report		Referee: Oğuz Özden; Assistant referees: Bülent Gündem; İbrahim Egüt

7 March 1982 Round 17	Tarsus İdmanyurdu	0 – 2	Mersin İdmanyurdu	City Stadium, Tarsus, Mersin
Sunday, 14:00		Report

21 March 1982 Round 18	Mersin İdmanyurdu	3 – 1	Hatayspor	Tevfik Sırrı Gür Stadium, Mersin
Sunday, 14:00		Report

28 March 1982 Round 19	Burdurspor	0 – 1	Mersin İdmanyurdu	City Stadium, Burdur
Sunday		Report

4 April 1982 Round 20	Mersin İdmanyurdu	2 – 1	Mardinspor	Tevfik Sırrı Gür Stadium, Mersin
Sunday, 15:00		Report

11 April 1982 Round 21	Elazığspor	0 – 0	Mersin İdmanyurdu	Atatürk Stadium, Elazığ
Sunday		Report

18 April 1982 Round 22	Mersin İdmanyurdu	1 – 0	İskenderunspor	Tevfik Sırrı Gür Stadium, Mersin
Sunday		Report

25 April 1982 Round 23	Urfaspor	0 – 0	Mersin İdmanyurdu	City Stadium, Şanlıurfa
Sunday		Report

2 May 1982 Round 24	Mersin İdmanyurdu	1 – 0	Gençlerbirliği	Tevfik Sırrı Gür Stadium, Mersin
Sunday, 16:30		Report	30' Levent	Referee: Halit Tankut; Assistant referees: Ertuğrul Duyguluöz; Yılmaz Sarıoğlu

9 May 1982 Round 25	Konyaspor	0 – 1	Mersin İdmanyurdu	Atatürk Stadium, Konya
Sunday		Report

16 May 1982 Round 26	Mersin İdmanyurdu	1 – 0	Ceyhanspor	Tevfik Sırrı Gür Stadium, Mersin
Sunday		Report

23 May 1982 Round 27	BYE	v	Mersin İdmanyurdu
Sunday

30 May 1982 Round 28	Kayserispor	1 – 0	Mersin İdmanyurdu	Atatürk Stadium, Kayseri
Sunday		Report

6 June 1982 Round 29	Mersin İdmanyurdu	3 – 0	Malatyaspor	Tevfik Sırrı Gür Stadium, Mersin
Sunday, 16:00		Report

13 June 1982 Round 30	Ispartaspor	1 – 2	Mersin İdmanyurdu	Atatürk Stadium, Isparta
Sunday, 16:00		Report		Referee: Lütfü Keçelioğlu (Ankara); Assistant referees: Haşmet Kasapoğlu; Zekai Kunak

== 1981–82 Turkish Cup participation ==
1981–82 Turkish Cup was played for the 20th season as Federasyon Kupası by 146 teams. First elimination round was played in one-leg elimination system. Second through sixth elimination rounds and finals were played in two-legs elimination system. Mersin İdmanyurdu participated in 1981–82 Turkish Cup from round 2 and was eliminated at round 6 (1/16) by Samsunspor. Samsunspor was eliminated at quarterfinals. Galatasaray won the Cup for the 7th time and became eligible for 1982–83 European Cup Winners' Cup.

=== Cup track ===
The drawings and results Mersin İdmanyurdu (MİY) followed in 1981–82 Turkish Cup are shown in the following table.

Round	Own League	Opponent's League	Opponent	A	H	Result
Round 2	Second League Group C	Second League Group C	Tarsus İdmanyurdu	1–1	2–0	Promoted to R3
Round 3	Second League Group C	Amateur	Konya Demirspor	2–2	2–0	Promoted to R4
Round 4	Second League Group C	Second League Group C	Ceyhanspor	2–1	0–1	Promoted to R5
Round 5	Second League Group C	Second League Group A	Sarıyer	3–0	1–0	Promoted to R6
Round 6	Second League Group C	Second League Group D	Samsunspor	0–0	0–1	Eliminated

Note: In the above table 'Score' shows For and Against goals whether the match played at home or not.

=== Game details ===
Mersin İdmanyurdu (MİY) 1981–82 Turkish Cup game reports is shown in the following table. Kick off times are in EET and EEST.

14 October 1982 Round 2 Leg 1	Tarsus İdmanyurdu	0 – 0	Mersin İdmanyurdu	City Stadium, Tarsus, Mersin
Wednesday, 15:00		Report

21 October 1981 Round 2 Leg 2	Mersin İdmanyurdu	2 – 0	Tarsus İdmanyurdu	Tevfik Sırrı Gür Stadium, Mersin
Wednesday, 14:30		Report

4 November 1981 Round 3 Leg 1	Mersin İdmanyurdu	2 – 0	Konya Demirspor	Tevfik Sırrı Gür Stadium, Mersin
Wednesday, 14:15		Report

11 November 1981 Round 3 Leg 2	Konya Demirspor	2 – 2	Mersin İdmanyurdu	City Stadium, Konya
Wednesday, 14:30		Report

25 November 1981 Round 4 Leg 1	Ceyhanspor	1 – 2	Mersin İdmanyurdu	City Stadium, Ceyhan, Adana
Wednesday, 14:15		Report

2 December 1981 Round 4 Leg 2	Mersin İdmanyurdu	0 – 1	Ceyhanspor	Tevfik Sırrı Gür Stadium, Mersin
Wednesday, 13:30		Report

24 February 1982 Round 5 Leg 1	Mersin İdmanyurdu	1 – 0	Sarıyer	Tevfik Sırrı Gür Stadium, Mersin
Wednesday, 14:00	Levent Dörtgöz 36'	Report		Referee: Halit Gerçeker

3 March 1982 Round 5 Leg 2	Sarıyer	0 – 3	Mersin İdmanyurdu	Sarıyer Stadium, Sarıyer, Istanbul
Wednesday, 14:00	Hayri Ülgen 46' (H); Oktay Çevik 50'; Muammer Yılmaz (yellow card) 52'	Report	(yellow card) 62' Memik Ertanıroğlu; (yellow card) 73' Esat Öksüzcük	Referee: Yavuz Karaozan
Note: Game was awarded to MİY (See note next to Report)

17 March 1982 Round 6 Leg 1	Samsunspor	0 – 0	Mersin İdmanyurdu	19 Mayıs Stadium, Samsun
Wednesday, 14:00	Naim Anuştekin (yellow card) 44'	Report		Referee: Sait Yaşar

24 March 1982 Round 6 Leg 2	Mersin İdmanyurdu	0 – 1	Samsunspor	Tevfik Sırrı Gür Stadium, Mersin
Wednesday, 15:00	Esat Öksüzcük (yellow card) 57'	Report	77' Ümit Birol	Referee: Ekrem Yenci

Source: 1981–82 Turkish Cup (Federasyon Kupası) pages.

== Management ==
=== Club management ===
Mehmet Fatih Deveci was club president.

=== Coaching team ===
1981–82 Mersin İdmanyurdu head coaches:

Nat	Head coach	Period	Pl	W	D	L	Notes
(Turkey)		01.08.1981 – 31.05.1982					

Note: Only official games were included.

== 1981–82 squad ==
Stats are counted for 1981–82 Second League matches and 1981–82 Turkish Cup (Federasyon Kupası) matches. In the team rosters five substitutes were allowed to appear, two of whom were substitutable. Only the players who appeared in game rosters were included and listed in the order of appearance.

O	N	Nat	Name	Birth	Born	Pos	LA	LG	CA	CG	TA	TG	Booked	Sent off (straight red)	← Season Notes →
1	1	(Turkey)	Salih Sayar	25 May 1957	Istanbul	GK									→ previous season.
2	2	(Turkey)	Tahir Temur	1954	Istanbul	DF						3			→ previous season.
3	3	(Turkey)	Esat Öksüzcük	22 Mar 1959	İzmit	DF									→ previous season.
4	4	(Turkey)	Mustafa Çimen	1952	Erdek	DF									→ previous season.
5	5	(Turkey)	İsmail Yavru	8 Aug 1958	Akçaabat	DF									→ previous season.
6	6	(Turkey)	Nasır Belci	1 Dec 1955	Adana	DF									→ previous season.
7	7	(Turkey)	Levent Arıkdoğan	23 Aug 1953	Mersin	MF									1981 ST İskenderunspor.
8	8	(Turkey)	Levent Dörtgöz	1958	Ankara	MF									→ previous season.
9	9	(Turkey)	Sertaç Yüzbaş	20 Mar 1958	Adana	MF						10			1981 ST Ankaragücü.
10	10	(Turkey)	Mehmet Ali Karakuş	25 Nov 1957	Erzincan	FW									→ previous season.
11	11	(Turkey)	Şükrü Işık	1959		FW									1981 ST İstanbulspor.
12	12	(Turkey)	Atıf Öztoprak	8 May 1952	Sakarya	GK									→ previous season.
13	13	(Turkey)	Osman Öngen	19 Jan 1954	Adana	DF									→ previous season.
14	10	(Turkey)	Mehmet Ertanıroğlu	1960	Tarsus	FW									1981 ST Tarsus İY.
15	11	(Turkey)	Öner Behlül			FW									1981 ST
16	11	(Turkey)	Haluk Turfan	22 Jan 1964	Mersin	FW									→ previous season.
17	13	(Turkey)	Abdulkadir Arslan	1 Nov 1961	Akçaabat	DF									1981 ST Trabzonspor.
18	6	(Turkey)	Raşit Karasu	31 Oct 1950	Istanbul	MF									→ previous season.
19	11	(Turkey)	Mehmet Şilan	17 Dec 1955	Mersin	FW									→ previous season.
20	10	(Turkey)	İrfan Ertürk	25 May 1957	Ahmetli	FW									1982 WL Göztepe.
21	3	(Turkey)	Levent			DF									→ previous season.
22	13	(Turkey)	Muammer												1981 ST Ank.Demirspor.
23	14	(Turkey)	Kemal												
24	15	(Turkey)	Suat												1981 ST Fenerbahçe.
25	16	(Turkey)	Hüseyin Kurtuldu	19 Jan 1963	Mersin	MF									→ previous season.
26	12	(Turkey)	Özcan Balta	1964	Mersin	GK									→ previous season.

Sources: 1981–82 season squad data from maçkolik com, Milliyet, and Cem Pekin Archives.

News from Milliyet:

- Transfers: Suat, Esat (Fenerbahçe (in exchange for Özcan)), Sertaç (Ankaragücü), Muammer (Ankara Demirspor), Levent (İskenderunspor), Memik (Tarsus İdmanyurdu), Metin (Sirkeci), Abdülkadir (Trabzonspor), Şükrü (İstanbulspor).
- Team squad: Salih, Atıf, Tahir, Esat, Mustafa, İsmail, Abdülkadir, Muammer, Şükrü, M.Ali, B.Levent, K.Levent, Nasır, Raşit, Levent, Kemal, Ömer, Suat, Sertaç, Memik, Sılan, Haluk.
- Galatasaray coach Birch did not want and Öner loaned from Galatasaray, 26.10.1981.
- Özcan Balta was capped in U-18 national team in European championship organized in Hama, Finland between 21–30 May 1982. Turkey was in the same group with Scotland, Holland and Albania.
- Kemal went to Galata Gençlik in Summer 1982. Reşit (Vefa Simtel)

== See also ==
- Football in Turkey
