= 1980–81 Mersin İdmanyurdu season =

Mersin İdmanyurdu
1980–81 season
- Coach: (Turkey) İsmet Arıkan
- Stadium: Mersin, Turkey
- First League: 15th (Relegated)
- Turkish Cup: Eliminated at QF
Home colours	Away colours	Third colours

Mersin İdmanyurdu (also Mersin İdman Yurdu, Mersin İY, or MİY) Sports Club; located in Mersin, east Mediterranean coast of Turkey in 1980–81. The 1980–81 season was the 10th season of Mersin İdmanyurdu (MİY) football team in First League, the first level division in Turkey. They have relegated to second division at the end of the season. It was third time the team relegated. The club signed with coach İsmet Arıkan. Arıkan's assistant was conditioner Seyfi Alanya.

== 1980–81 First League participation ==
The 1980–81 season was the 23rd season of First League. The league was played with 16 teams and last three teams were relegated to Second League 1981–82. Mersin İdmanyurdu finished 15th First League 1980–81 season and relegated to second division.

Mersin İdmanyurdu has become the only team in the history of Turkish first level football league, whose points were deleted. In 1980–81 season the team has drawn away from the field in Beşiktaş game. For that reason TFF decided to award the match to Beşiktaş by 3-0 and delete two extra points of MİY. MİY finished season with 21 points at 15th place, 6 points back of 14th team.

At the end of first half MİY became the most violent team with 3 red cards, Tahir, Mücellip, Ali. Mehmet Şilan, Kazım and Osman were one match suspended players due to yellow card penalties.

=== Results summary ===
Mersin İdmanyurdu (MİY) 1980–81 First League summary:

	Overall									Home								Away							
Stage	Pc	Pl	W	D	L	GF	GA	GD	Pt	Pl	W	D	L	GF	GA	GD	Pt	Pl	W	D	L	GF	GA	GD	Pt
First half	14	15	4	3	8	9	16	-7	11	8	4	3	1	8	3	+5	11	7	0	0	7	1	13	-12	0
Second half		15	4	4	7	12	18	-6	12	7	4	1	2	8	6	+2	9	8	0	3	5	4	12	-8	3
Overall	15	30	8	7	15	21	34	+13	23	15	8	4	3	16	9	+7	20	15	0	3	12	5	25	-20	3

Sources: 1980–81 Turkish First Football League pages.

=== League table ===
Mersin İY's league performance in Turkey First League in 1980–81 season is shown in the following table.

Pos	Team	Pld	W	D	L	GF	GA	GD	Pts	Qualification or relegation
12	Adana Demirspor	30	11	7	12	25	26	−1	29	
13	Boluspor	30	9	11	10	32	36	−4	29	
14	Çaykur Rizespor (R)	30	11	7	12	35	42	−7	29	Relegation to Turkish Second Football League
15	Mersin İdman Yurdu (R)	30	8	7	15	21	34	−13	23	Relegation to Turkish Second Football League
16	Orduspor (R)	30	8	4	18	19	38	−19	20	Relegation to Turkish Second Football League

Rules for classification: 1) points; 2) goal difference; 3) number of goals scored.
(R) Relegated

=== Results by round ===
Results of games MİY played in 1980–81 First League by rounds:

Round	1	2	3	4	5	6	7	8	9	10	11	12	13	14	15	16	17	18	19	20	21	22	23	24	25	26	27	28	29	30
Ground	H	A	H	H	H	A	H	A	H	H	A	A	H	A	A	A	H	A	H	A	H	A	H	A	H	A	A	H	H	A
Result	W	L	D	W	L	L	D	L	D	W	L	L	W	L	L	L	L	L	W	L	W	D	W	L	W	D	D	D	L	L
Position	3	11	11	6	9	11	9	11	12	9	11	12	11	14	14	14	15	15	15	16	15	15	15	15	15	15	15	15	15	15

Source: 1980–81 Turkish First Football League pages.
A = Away; H = Home; W = Win; D = Draw; L = Loss

=== First half ===
24 August 1980 Round 1	Mersin İdmanyurdu	3 – 1	Kocaelispor	Tevfik Sırrı Gür Stadium, Mersin
Sunday, 17:00	Özcan Kızıltan 8'; Feridun Alkan 47' (pen.); Mücellip Pehlivan 55'	Report	16' Mahir Danabay; (yellow card) 34' Mustafa Çapanoğlu	Referee: Yahya Diker

31 August 1980 Round 2	Beşiktaş	3 – 0	Mersin İdmanyurdu	İnönü Stadium, Beşiktaş, Istanbul
Sunday, 17:00	Mehmet Ekşi 30' (pen.); Mehmet Ekşi 51' (pen.); Ziya Doğan 62'	Report		Attendance: 27.606; Referee: Sadık Deda
Note: MİY coach İsmet Arıkan has withdrawn team from the field as a protest to referee's decisions.

7 September 1980 Round 3	Mersin İdmanyurdu	0 – 0	Trabzonspor	Tevfik Sırrı Gür Stadium, Mersin
Sunday, 17:00		Report		Referee: Talat Tokat

27 September 1980 Round 4	Mersin İdmanyurdu	2 – 0	Zonguldakspor	Tevfik Sırrı Gür Stadium, Mersin
Sunday, 15:00	Mücellip Pehlivan 20'; Mücellip Pehlivan 26'	Report		Referee: Erdoğan Albay

19 October 1980 Round 5	Mersin İdmanyurdu	0 – 1	Galatasaray	Tevfik Sırrı Gür Stadium, Mersin
Sunday, 15:00	Mehmet Ali Karakuş (yellow card) 51'; Tahir Temur (red card) 76'; Atıf Öztoprak (yellow card) 78'	Report	65' Cüneyt Tanman; (yellow card) 71' Cüneyt Tanman; (red card) 76' Öner Kılıç	Referee: İhsan Türe

26 October 1980 Round 6	Adana Demirspor	2 – 1	Mersin İdmanyurdu	City Stadium, Adana
Sunday, 15:00	Hasan Eryiğit 37'; Hasan Eryiğit 77'; İzzet Çağlayan (yellow card) 87'	Report	32' Harun Erol; (yellow card) 29' Mücellip Pehlivan	Referee: Celal Türk

2 November 1980 Round 7	Mersin İdmanyurdu	0 – 0	Gaziantepspor	Tevfik Sırrı Gür Stadium, Mersin
Sunday, 14:15	Mehmet Ali karakuş (yellow card) 9'; Mehmet Şilan (yellow card) 40'; Özcan Kızıltan (yellow card) 65'	Report	(yellow card) 33' Ahmet Yılmaz; (yellow card) 57' Fatih Zambak; (yellow card) 77' Hayri Kol; (yellow card) 88' Ünsal Özer	Referee: Nihat Özbirgül

9 November 1980 Round 8	Rizespor	1 – 0	Mersin İdmanyurdu	City Stadium, Rize
Sunday, 14:00	Hüseyin Hemşinlioğlu 80'	Report		Referee: Teoman Parer

16 November 1980 Round 9	Mersin İdmanyurdu	1 – 1	Fenerbahçe	Tevfik Sırrı Gür Stadium, Mersin
Sunday, 14:15	Mücellip Pehlivan 47'; Osman Öngen (yellow card) 51'; Mehmet Ali Karakuş (red card) 83'	Report	25' Ali Kemal Denizci; (yellow card) 79' Ali Kemal Denizci; (yellow card) 83' (red card) Onur Kayador	Referee: Yılmaz Önen

23 November 1980 Round 10	Mersin İdmanyurdu	1 – 0	Boluspor	Tevfik Sırrı Gür Stadium, Mersin
Sunday, 14:15	Mücellip Pehlivan 82'	Report		Referee: Nihat Gülşen

7 December 1980 Round 11	Adanaspor	1 – 0	Mersin İdmanyurdu	City Stadium, Adana
Sunday, 13:30	Bora Öztürk 88'	Report	(yellow card) 17' Osman Öngen; (yellow card) 33' Mehmet Şilan; (yellow card) 69' Kazım Renk; (yellow card) 71' Mehmet Ali Karakuş	Referee: Güngör Tuncel

14 December 1980 Round 12	Eskişehirspor	2 – 0	Mersin İdmanyurdu	Atatürk Stadium, Eskişehir
Sunday, 13:45	Aykut Yiğit (yellow card) 67'; Ali İhsan Silin 80'	Report		Referee: Halil Atalık

21 December 1980 Round 13	Mersin İdmanyurdu	1 – 0	Bursaspor	Tevfik Sırrı Gür Stadium, Mersin
Sunday, 13:30	Mücellip Pehlivan 34'	Report		Referee: Talat Tokat

28 December 1980 Round 14	Altay	3 – 0	Mersin İdmanyurdu	Alsancak Stadium, İzmir
Sunday, 14:00	Ethem Adlığ 20'; Şeref İncirmen 44'; Behiç Başatuğrul 52'	Report	(yellow card) 48' Osman Öngen	Referee: Nihat Güner

4 January 1981 Round 15	Orduspor	1 – 0	Mersin İdmanyurdu	19 Eylül Stadium, Ordu
Sunday, 13:15	Şenol Çorlu 16'; Şenol Çorlu (yellow card) 39'	Report	(yellow card) 39' Mustafa Çimen	Referee: Necmi Temizel

=== Second half ===
1 February 1981 Round 16	Kocaelispor	3 – 2	Mersin İdmanyurdu	İsmetpaşa Stadium, İzmit, Kocaeli
Sunday, 14:30	Turgay Aksu 1'; Güvenç Kurtar 12'; Kamil Öztezer 22'; Orhan Görsen (yellow card) 40'	Report	18' Vehbi Günay; 76' Vehbi Günay	Referee: Coşkun Kutay

8 February 1981 Round 17	Mersin İdmanyurdu	0 – 1	Beşiktaş	Tevfik Sırrı Gür Stadium, Mersin
Sunday, 14:00	Vehbi Günay (yellow card) 18'; Mustafa Çimen (yellow card) 58'; Mehmet Şilan (yellow card) 67'; Mehmet Ali Karakuş (yellow card) 78'	Report	23' Özer Umdu	Attendance: 20.000; Referee: Talat Tokat

15 February 1981 Round 18	Trabzonspor	3 – 0	Mersin İdmanyurdu	Hüseyin Avni Aker Stadium, Mersin
Sunday, 13:45	Sinan Ünal 58'; Sinan Ünal 76'; Sinan Ünal 81'	Report		Attendance: 15.000; Referee: Ünal Şahin

22 February 1981 Round 19	Mersin İdmanyurdu	2 – 0	Altay	Tevfik Sırrı Gür Stadium, Mersin
Sunday, 14:00	Sedat Gezer 5'; Nevruz Şerif 75'; Vehbi Günay (yellow card) 68'	Report	(yellow card) 44' Sabahattin Erbuğa; (yellow card) 79' Mustafa Turgat; (yellow card) 87' Mustafa Denizli	Referee: Yusuf Namoğlu

1 March 1981 Round 20	Zonguldakspor	2 – 0	Mersin İdmanyurdu	City Stadium, Zonguldak
Sunday, 14:15	Ayhan Akbin 20'; Kemal Yıldırım 60'	Report	(yellow card) 65' Mücellip Pehlivan	Referee: Erkan Göksel

8 March 1981 Round 21	Mersin İdmanyurdu	1 – 0	Orduspor	Tevfik Sırrı Gür Stadium, Mersin
Sunday, 14:30	Nevruz Şerif 23' (pen.)	Report		Referee: Cumhur Demir

14 March 1981 Round 22	Galatasaray	0 – 0	Mersin İdmanyurdu	İnönü Stadium, Beşiktaş, Istanbul
Saturday, 15:00		Report	(yellow card) 52' Nejdet Öksüzcük; (yellow card) 78' Mehmet Şilan	Attendance: 14.788; Referee: İhsan Türe

29 March 1981 Round 23	Mersin İdmanyurdu	1 – 0	Adana Demirspor	Tevfik Sırrı Gür Stadium, Mersin
Sunday, 14:30	Vehbi Günay 4'; Özcan Kızıltan (yellow card) 51'; Vehbi Günay (yellow card) 80'	Report		Referee: Ekrem Yenci

5 April 1981 Round 24	Gaziantepspor	1 – 0	Mersin İdmanyurdu	Kamil Ocak Stadium, Gaziantep
Sunday, 14:45	Erdal Evyapan 11'	Report	(yellow card) 40' Levent Dörtgöz; (yellow card) 68' Özcan Kızıltan	Attendance: 10.000; Referee: Yılmaz Dinçel

19 April 1981 Round 25	Mersin İdmanyurdu	2 – 1	Rizespor	Tevfik Sırrı Gür Stadium, Mersin
Sunday, 16:00	Tahir Temur 40'; Harun Erol 68'	Report	58' Sinan Turhan	Referee: Erkan Göksel

26 April 1981 Round 26	Fenerbahçe	1 – 1	Mersin İdmanyurdu	İnönü Stadium, Beşiktaş, Istanbul
Sunday, 16:00	Alpaslan Eratlı 55' (pen.)	Report	7' Metin Çekiçler; (yellow card) 28' Sedat Gezer; (yellow card) 61' Vehbi Günay	Attendance: 16.570; Referee: Coşkun Kutay

3 May 1981 Round 27	Boluspor	1 – 1	Mersin İdmanyurdu	City Stadium, Bolu
Sunday, 16:00	Mehmet Akdülger 78'; Alaattin Yolaçan (yellow card) 26'	Report	67' Nevruz Şerif; (yellow card) 26' Mehmet Ali Karakuş	Referee: Necmi Temizel

10 May 1981 Round 28	Mersin İdmanyurdu	2 – 2	Adanaspor	Tevfik Sırrı Gür Stadium, Mersin
Sunday, 16:00	Tahir Temur 19'; Vehbi Günay 57'	Report	18' Ercan Albay; 79' Ahmet Kahraman; (yellow card) 71' Şevket Kesler	Referee: Ekrem Yenci

17 May 1981 Round 29	Mersin İdmanyurdu	0 – 2	Eskişehirspor	Tevfik Sırrı Gür Stadium, Mersin
Sunday, 16:00	Sedat Gezer (yellow card) 51'; Vehbi Günay (yellow card) 88'	Report	47' Aykut Yiğit; 84' Ali İhsan Silin; (yellow card) 65' İhsan İdikut	Referee: Yusuf Namoğlu

24 May 1981 Round 30	Bursaspor	1 – 0	Mersin İdmanyurdu	Atatürk Stadium, Bursa
Sunday, 16:00	Sedat Özden 11'	Report	(yellow card) 63' Özcan Kızıltan	Referee: Özer Kızıltan

== 1980–81 Turkish Cup participation ==
1980–81 Turkish Cup was played for the 19th season as Türkiye Kupası by 139 teams. First four elimination rounds were played in one-leg elimination system. Fifth and sixth elimination rounds and finals were played in two-legs elimination system. Mersin İdmanyurdu participated in 1980–81 Turkish Cup from round 5 and was eliminated at quarterfinals by Fenerbahçe. Fenerbahçe was eliminated at semifinals by Ankaragücü. Ankaragücü won the Cup for the 2nd time and became eligible for 1981–82 European Cup Winners' Cup. Ankaragücü who won the Cup as a second division team was also promoted to 1981-82 First League by means of a special decision which was applied only for them.

=== Cup track ===
The drawings and results Mersin İdmanyurdu (MİY) followed in 1980–81 Turkish Cup are shown in the following table.

Round	Own League	Opponent's League	Opponent	A	H	Result
Round 5	First League	Second League Group B	Şekerspor	1–1	1–0	Promoted to R6
Round 6	First League	Second League Group B	Samsunspor	0–1	2–0	Promoted to QF
QF	First League	First League	Fenerbahçe	0–2	0–2	Eliminated

Note: In the above table 'Score' shows For and Against goals whether the match played at home or not.

=== Game details ===
Mersin İdmanyurdu (MİY) 1980–81 Turkish Cup game reports is shown in the following table. Kick off times are in EET and EEST.

12 November 1980 Round 5 Leg 1	Şekerspor	1 – 1	Mersin İdmanyurdu	19 Mayıs Stadium, Ankara
Wednesday, 14:30	Hayri Obüs 86'	Report	64' Raşit Karasu	Referee: Yahya Diker

17 December 1980 Round 5 Leg 2	Mersin İdmanyurdu	1 – 0	Şekerspor	Tevfik Sırrı Gür Stadium, Mersin
Wednesday, 13:30	Mücellip Pehlivan 27'; Mehmet Ali Karakuş (yellow card) 38'	Report	(yellow card) 54' Mehmet Kahveci; (yellow card) 68' İsmet Kaynar	Referee: Fikri Öztürk

25 February 1981 Round 6 Leg 1	Samsunspor	1 – 0	Mersin İdmanyurdu	19 Mayıs Stadium, Samsun
Wednesday, 13:45	Metin Karabulut 76'; Hakkı Bayrak (red card) 38'	Report		Referee: Erol Polat

11 March 1981 Round 6 Leg 2	Mersin İdmanyurdu	2 – 0 (a.e.t.)	Samsunspor	Tevfik Sırrı Gür Stadium, Mersin
Wednesday, 14:30	Mücellip Pehlivan 78'; Özcan Kızıltan 110'; Özcan Kızıltan (yellow card) 42'	Report	(yellow card) 59' Kenan Topçu	Referee: Erkan Göksel

1 April 1981 QF Leg 1	Fenerbahçe	2 – 0	Mersin İdmanyurdu	İnönü Stadium, Beşiktaş, Istanbul
Wednesday, 15:00	Selçuk Yula 28'; Raşit Çetiner 88'; Sedat Karaoğlu (red card) 72'	Report	(yellow card) 16' Özcan Kızıltan; (yellow card) 29' Vehbi Günay; (yellow card) 74' Sedat Gezer	Attendance: 15.465; Referee: İbrahim Acar

8 April 1981 QF Leg 2	Mersin İdmanyurdu	0 – 2	Fenerbahçe	Tevfik Sırrı Gür Stadium, Mersin
Wednesday, 15:00	Mücellip Pehlivan (yellow card) 44' (red card)	Report	33' (F) İsa Ertürk; 77' Mustafa Arabacıbaşı; (yellow card) 40' Müjdat Yetkiner; (yellow card) 44' İsa Ertürk; (yellow card) 68' Raşit Çetiner	Attendance: 2.989; Referee: Yavuz Tunç

Source: 1980–81 Turkish Cup pages.

== Management ==
=== Club management ===
Aslan Çevirgen was club president.

=== Coaching team ===
1980–81 Mersin İdmanyurdu head coaches:

Nat	Head coach	Period	Pl	W	D	L	Notes
(Turkey)		01.08.1980 – 31.05.1981					

Note: Only official games were included.

== 1980–81 squad ==
Stats are counted for 1980–81 First League matches and 1980–81 Turkish Cup (Türkiye Kupası) matches. In the team rosters five substitutes were allowed to appear, two of whom were substitutable. Only the players who appeared in game rosters were included and listed in the order of appearance.

O	N	Nat	Name	Birth	Born	Pos	LA	LG	CA	CG	TA	TG	Booked	Sent off (straight red)	← Season Notes →
1	1	(Turkey)	Salih Sayar	25 May 1957	Istanbul	GK	26		5		31				→ previous season.
2	2	(Turkey)	Tahir Temur	1954	Istanbul	DF	11	2	1		12	2		1	→ previous season.
3	3	(Turkey)	İsmail Yavru	8 Aug 1958	Akçaabat	DF	16		4		20				1980 ST Trabzonspor.
4	4	(Turkey)	Mustafa Çimen	1952	Erdek	DF	20		4		24		2		1980 ST Beşiktaş.
5	5	(Turkey)	Feridun Alkan			DF	13	1			13	1			→ previous season.
6	6	(Turkey)	Nasır Belci	1 Dec 1955	Adana	DF	7		1		8				→ previous season.
7	7	(Turkey)	Levent Dörtgöz	1958	Ankara	MF	26		4		30		1		1980 ST Gençlerbirliği.
8	8	(Turkey)	Özcan Kızıltan	12 Jul 1959	Istanbul	MF	25	1	4	1	29	2	6		→ previous season.
9	9	(Turkey)	Harun Erol	25 Oct 1960	Çankırı	FW	24	2	6		30	2			1980 ST Gençlerbirliği.
10	10	(Turkey)	Mücellip Pehlivan	1 Aug 1954	Lüleburgaz	FW	26	6	6	2	32	8	3	1	→ previous season.
11	11	(Turkey)	Mehmet Şilan	17 Dec 1955	Mersin	FW	16		2		18		4		→ previous season.
12	12	(Turkey)	Atıf Öztoprak	8 May 1952	Sakarya	GK	3				3		1		→ previous season.
13	13	(Turkey)	Yusuf Turan	9 Aug 1958	Trabzon	DF	19		4		23				1980 ST Sebat Gençlik.
14	14	(Turkey)	Mehmet Ali Karakuş	25 Nov 1957	Erzincan	FW	19		3		22		6	1	→ previous season.
15	15	(Turkey)	Kenan Aydın	28 May 1959	Adana	DF	1				1				→ previous season.
16	13	(Turkey)	Kazım Renk			FW	6				6		1		→ previous season.
17	14	(Turkey)	Eyüp Hazeren			DF	10		1		11				1980 ST Adanaspor.
18	15	(Turkey)	Levent			DF									
19	2	(Turkey)	Osman Öngen	19 Jan 1954	Adana	DF	11		1		12		3		→ previous season.
20	13	(Turkey)	Nejat Ersin	29 Aug 1959	Adapazarı	DF	1				1				1980 ST A.Demirspor.
21	6	(Turkey)	Raşit Karasu	31 Oct 1950	Istanbul	MF	8		5	1	13	1			→ previous season.
22	12	(Turkey)	Özcan Balta	1964	Mersin	GK									First time professional.
23	1	(Turkey)	Ahmet Lülü	19 Jan 1952	Mersin	GK	1		1		2				
24	8	(Turkey)	Nevruz Şerif	22 Mar 1951	Istanbul	MF	14	3	3		17	3			1981 WL Altay.
25	4	(Turkey)	Esat Öksüzcük	22 Mar 1959	İzmit	DF	13		4		17		1		1981 WT.
26	5	(Turkey)	Sedat Gezer	15 Nov 1954	Samsun	DF	15	1	4		19	1	3		1981 WT Diyarbakırspor.
27	7	(Turkey)	Metin Çekiçler	3 Jan 1961	Istanbul	FW	13	1	2		15	1			1981 WL Galatasaray.
28	10	(Turkey)	Vehbi Günay	1953	Görele	FW	14	4	2		16	4	6		1981 WL Diyarbakırspor.
29	15	(Turkey)	Haluk Turfan	22 Jan 1964	Mersin	FW									First time professional.
30	16	(Turkey)	Hüseyin Kurtuldu	19 Jan 1963	Mersin	MF									First time professional.

Sources: 1980–81 season squad data from maçkolik com, Milliyet, and Cem Pekin Archives.

News from Milliyet:

- Transfers in (Summer): İsmail (Trabzonspor); Right-back Mustafa Çimen (Beşiktaş); Harun, Levent (Gençlerbirliği); Yusuf (Sebat Gençlik), Eyüp (Adanaspor); Raşit (Tarsus İdmanyurdu).
- In the mid-season K.Metin was loaned from Galatasaray; and Vehbi was loaned from Diyarbakırspor. Nevruz loaned from Altay (21.12.1980).
- Özcan went to Fenerbahçe after the season (30.04.1981). In exchange Esat and İsmail came to MİY from Fenerbahçe.

== See also ==
- Football in Turkey
