= Zincirlikuyu Cemetery =

Burial ground in Istanbul, Turkey

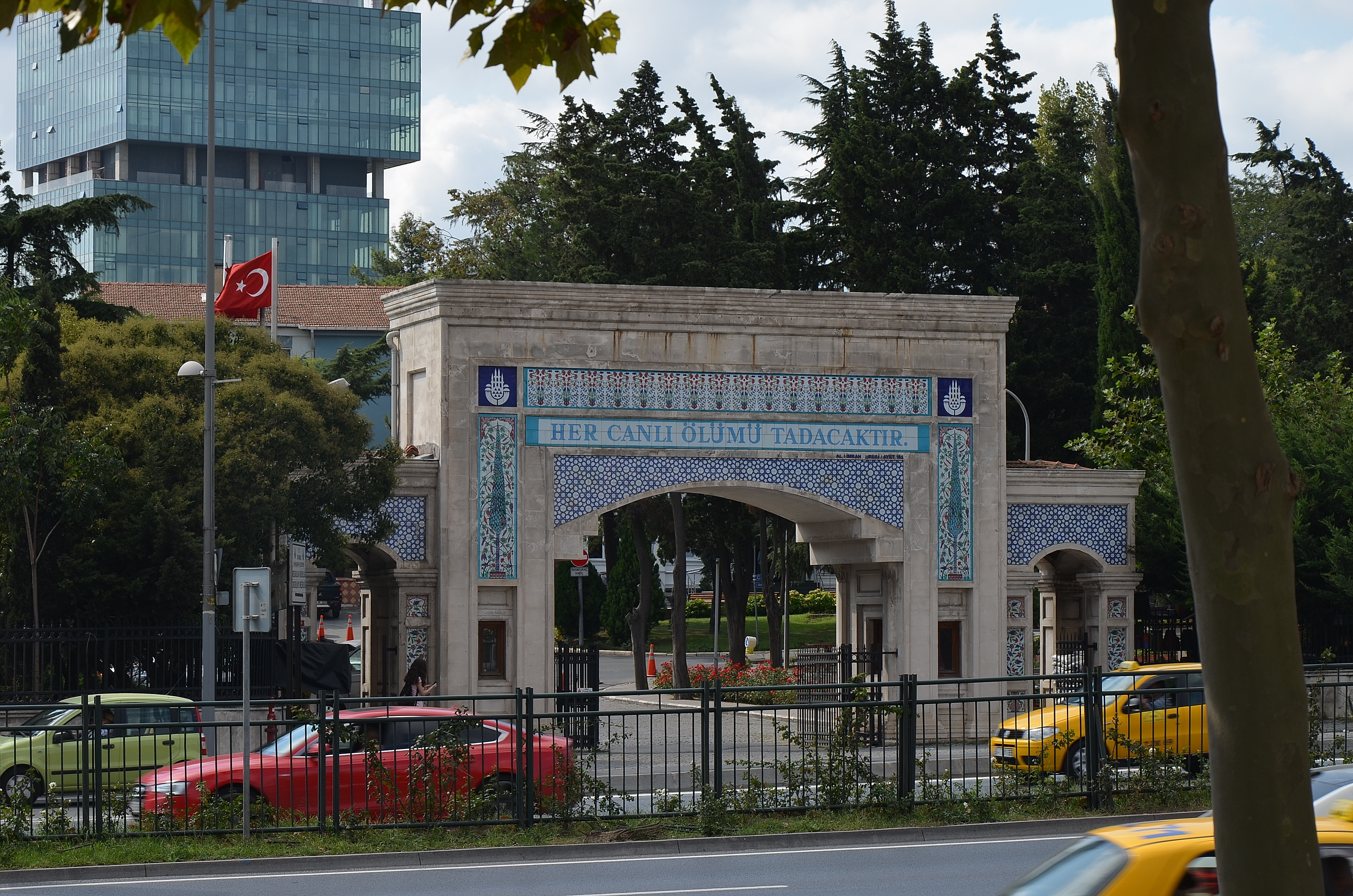
- Main gate of the cemetery at Büyükdere Avenue in Zincirlikuyu.
- Interactive map of Zincirlikuyu Cemetery

Details
- Established: 1935
- Location: Şişli, Istanbul
- Country: Turkey
- Coordinates: 41°4′30″N 29°0′30″E
- Type: Public
- Owned by: Istanbul Metropolitan Municipality
- Size: 0.381 km^{2} (94 acres)
- Website: İBB Mezarlıklar Md. website

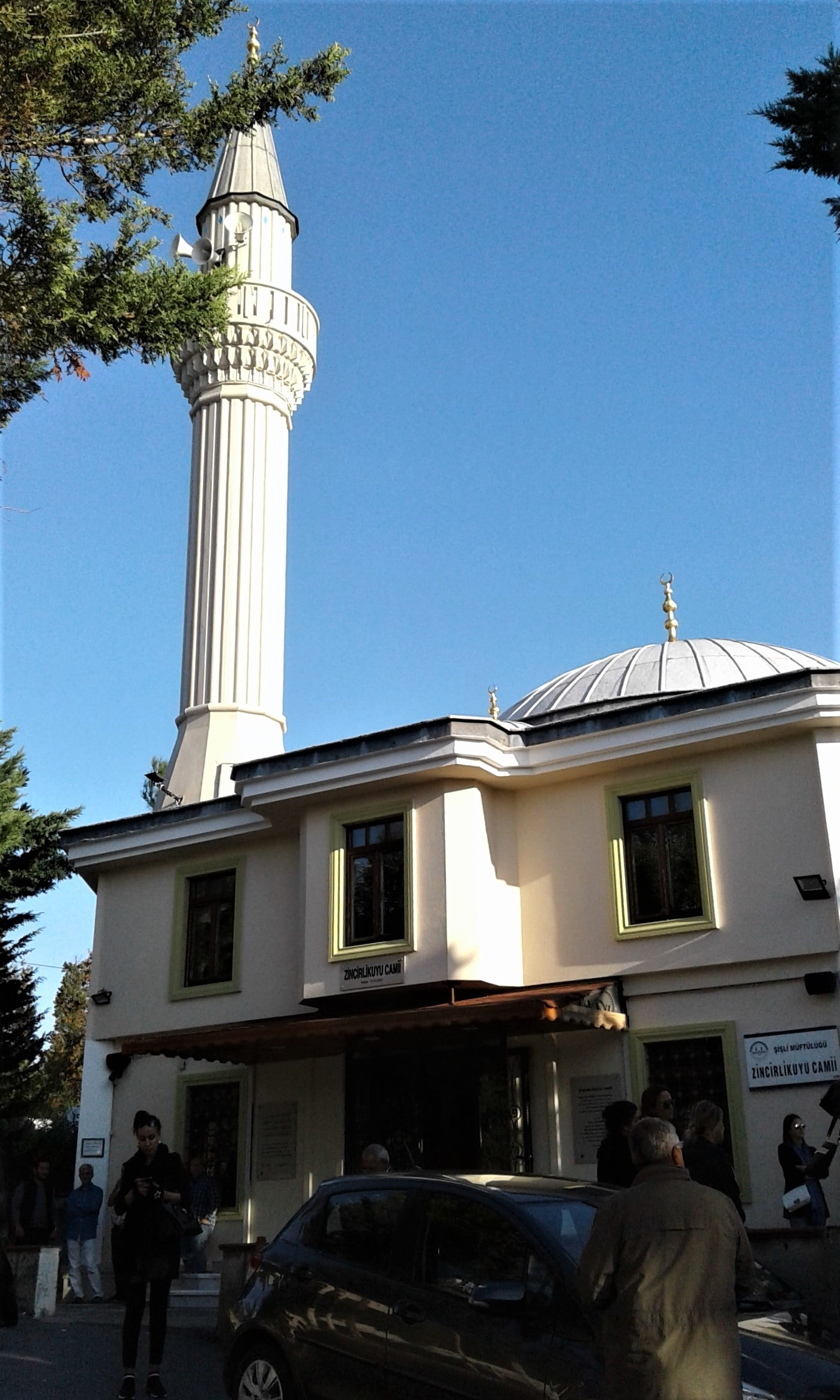
Zincirlikuyu Mosque in the Zincirliyikuyu Cemetery

The Zincirlikuyu Cemetery (Turkish: Zincirlikuyu Mezarlığı) is a modern burial ground in the European part of Istanbul, Turkey. It is administered by the Metropolitan Municipality. Many prominent figures from the world of politics, business, sports and arts rest here.

The cemetery is located on the Büyükdere Avenue in Zincirlikuyu, Şişli district between Esentepe and Levent neighborhoods. It is Istanbul's first cemetery established in a contemporary structure. Planned in 1935, the burial place reached its present boundaries in the 1950s. It has an area of 0.381 km^{2} (94 acres), which is full, excluding family graves.

A mosque within the cemetery, built and donated by the Turkish entrepreneur İbrahim Bodur, was opened on 2 April 2004. The mosque is specially constructed for burial prayers, and has a capacity of 500 people.

The office of the İstanbul Cemeteries Administration is located in the building at the entrance of the cemetery.

Over the gate of the cemetery is inscribed a verse from the Qur'an: "Her canlı ölümü tadacaktır" (Every living thing will taste death).

== Notable burials ==
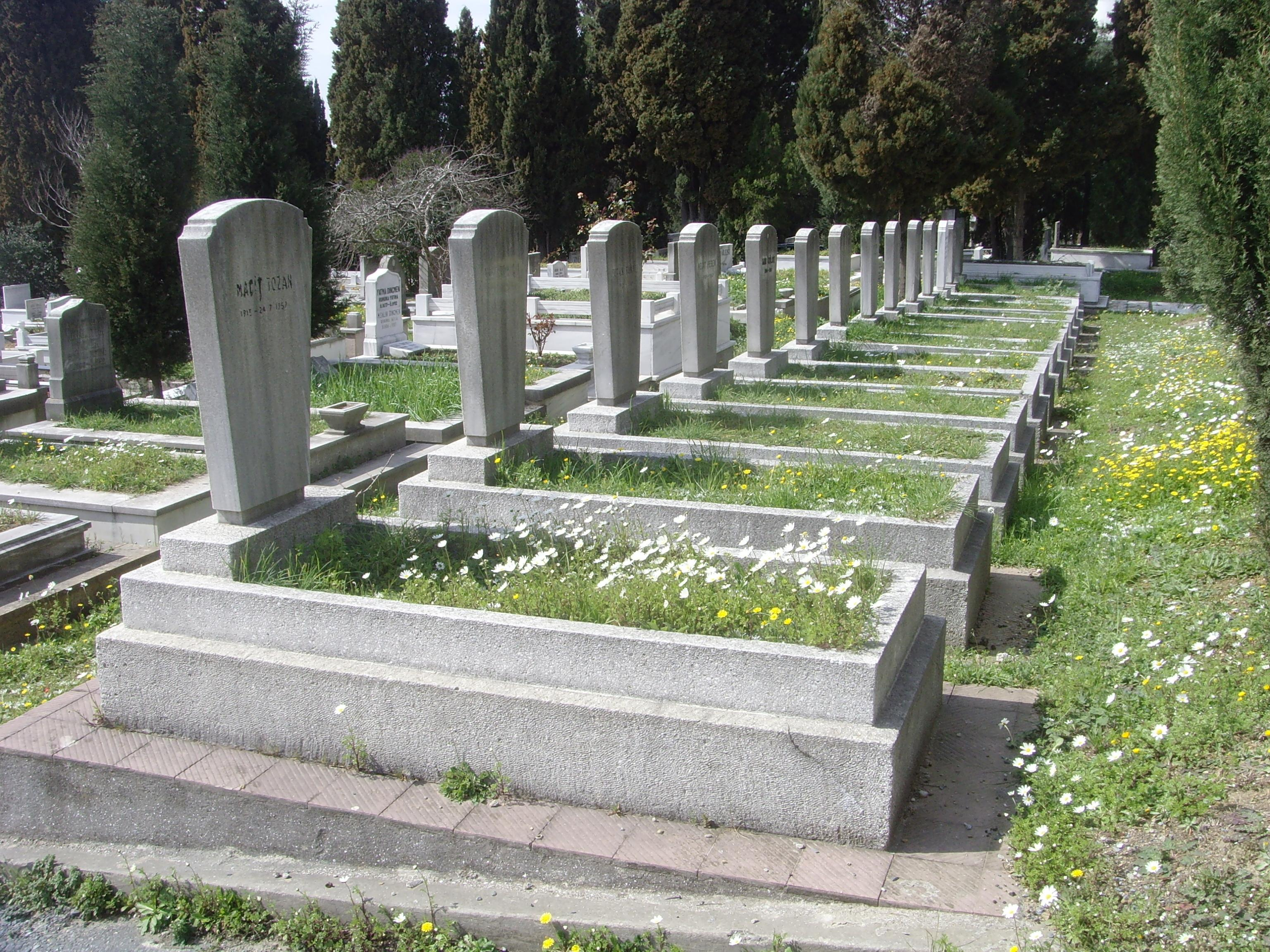
Graves at Zincirlikuyu Cemetery

Listed in alphabetical order of family names:

=== A ===
- Nermin Abadan Unat (1921–2025), academic, lawyer, sociologist and writer
- Makbule Abasıyanık (1883–1963), writer and philanthropist
- Naile Akıncı (1923–2014), female painter
- Sait Faik Abasıyanık (1906–1954), short story writer
- Behiye Aksoy (1933–2015), female singer
- Yıldırım Aktuna (1930–2007), psychiatrist and politician
- Zeki Alasya (1943–2015), actor and film director
- Sadri Alışık (1925–1995), film actor
- Cahit Aral (1927–2011), engineer and former government minister
- Oğuz Aral (1936–2004), political cartoonist
- Mübeccel Argun (1909–1982), sportswoman, teacher of physical education and radio presenter
- Benal Nevzat İstar Arıman (1903–1990), poet, writer and politician being as one of the first 18 female members of the Turkish parliament
- Cüneyt Arkin (1937–2022), actor and medical doctor
- Duygu Asena (1946–2006), columnist, best seller author and activist for women's rights
- Falih Rıfkı Atay (1894–1971), journalist, writer and politician
- Safiye Ayla (1907–1998), female singer

=== B ===
- Turhan Baytop (1920–2002), botanist
- Refet Bele (1881–1963), general
- Ekrem Bora (1934–2012), film actor
- Behice Boran (1910–1987), Marxist sociologist, politician and author
- Orhan Boran (1928–2012), comedian, radio and TV host
- Rıza Tevfik Bölükbaşı (1869–1949), philosopher, poet and politician
- Erol Bulut (1955–2021), painter and professor of painting
- Erol Büyükburç (1936–2015), pop music singer, composer and actor

=== C–Ç ===
- İsmail Cem (1940–2007), politician, journalist and statesman
- İhsan Sabri Çağlayangil (1908–1993), politician, Minister of Foreign Affairs and Chairman of the Senate
- Faruk Nafiz Çamlıbel (1898–1973), poet and politician
- Selahattin Çetiner (1922–2023), military officer and politician, Minister of the Interior (1980–1983)

=== D ===
- Belgin Doruk (1936–1995), film actress
- Gürdal Duyar (1935–2004), sculptor

=== E ===
- Nejat Eczacıbaşı (1913–1993), chemist and businessman
- Şakir Eczacıbaşı (1929–2010), pharmacist, photographer and businessman
- Çetin Emeç (1935–1990), journalist
- Refik Erduran (1928–2017), playwright, columnist and writer,
- Nihat Erim (1912–1980), jurist, politician and Prime minister
- Genco Erkal (1938–2024), drama actor
- Muhsin Ertuğrul (1892–1979), actor and director
- Suphi Ezgi (1869–1962), military physician and musicologist, componist

=== F ===
- Fahire Fersan (1900–1997), classical kemençe virtuosa
- Defne Joy Foster (1975–2011), Afro-American actress, presenter, VJ

=== G ===
- Ayten Gökçer (1940–2024), actress,
- Ayşen Gruda (1944–2019), actress,
- Cemal Nadir Güler (1902–1947), cartoonist,
- Aysel Gürel (1929–2008), actress and lyricist
- Melahat Gürsel (1900–1975), 4th First Lady (1960–1966),
- Müslüm Gürses (1953–2013), singer and actor

=== H ===
- Fikret Hakan (1934–2017), actor
- Vahit Melih Halefoğlu (1919–2017), politician and diplomat,

=== I–İ ===
- Rıfat Ilgaz (1911–1993), poet and story writer,
- Ayhan Işık (1929–1979), film actor
- Erdal İnönü (1926–2007), scientist and statesman
- Abdi İpekçi (1929–1979), journalist and intellectual
- Fatma Hikmet İşmen (1918–2006), agricultural engineer, socialist politician, former senator

=== J ===
- Remzi Aydın Jöntürk (1936–1987), film director, film producer, screenwriter, painter and poet

=== K ===
- Banu Kırbağ (1951–2025), musician and pop artist.
- Feridun Karakaya (1928–2004), comedy actor
- Refik Halit Karay (1888–1965), writer and journalist,
- Ömer Kavur (1944–2005), film director, film producer and screenwriter
- Orhan Kemal (1914–1970), novelist
- Yaşar Kemal (1923–2015), novelist
- Ali Kılıç (1889–1971), officer of the Ottoman Army, politician and army officer of the Republic of Turkey
- Dündar Kılıç (1935–1999), mob boss
- Suna Kıraç (1941–2020), member of Koç family, businesswoman and museum founder,
- Levent Kirca (1948–2015), actor
- Lütfi Kırdar (1887–1961), Governor and Mayor of Istanbul, Minister of Health and Social Security
- Vehbi Koç (1901–1996), entrepreneur and once Turkey's wealthiest person
- Mustafa Vehbi Koç (1960–2016), businessman and chairman of Turkey's largest congloromerate Koç Holding
- Neriman Köksal (1928–1999), actress

=== M ===
- Şaziye Moral (1903–1985), stage, film and voice actress

=== N ===
- Fethi Naci (1927–2008), literary critic and writer
- Behçet Necatigil (1916–1979), poet
- Muhterem Nur (1932–2020), film actress and pop music singer

=== O–Ö ===
- Meral Okay (1959–2012), actress and screenwriter
- Yaman Okay (1951–1993), actor
- Ali Fethi Okyar (1880–1943), diplomat, politician, Prime Minister and Speaker of the Parliament
- Vedat Okyar (1945–2009), footballer and sports journalist
- Gündüz Tekin Onay (1942–2008), footballer and coach of Beşiktaş J.K.
- Zeki Ökten (1941–2009), film director
- Coşkun Özarı (1931–2011), footballer and national team coach
- Attila Özdemiroğlu (1943–2016), composer and arranger.

=== R ===
- Türkan Rado (1915–2007), first Turkish female professor of jurisprudence
- Halit Refiğ (1934–2009), film director, film producer and screenwriter

=== S–Ş ===
- Mehmet Sabancı (1963–2004), businessman
- Sakıp Sabancı (1933–2004), entrepreneur and Turkey's second richest man
- Hasan Saka (1885–1960), politician and Prime minister
- Şükrü Saracoğlu (1887–1953) Prime minister and president of Fenerbahçe S.K.
- Türkan Saylan (1935–2009), Prof. Doctor, educator
- Timur Selçuk (1946–2020), singer, pianist, conductor and composer,
- Müzeyyen Senar (1918–2015), Turkish classical music singer
- Ömer Seyfettin (1884–1920), novelist
- Aydan Siyavuş (1947–1998), basketball coach
- Mümtaz Soysal (1929–2019), professor of constitutional law, political scientist, politician, human rights activist, senior advisor, columnist and author,
- Sevgi Soysal (1936–1976), female novelist
- Ruhi Su (1912–1985), folk music singer
- Kemal Sunal (1944–2000), film actor and comedian
- Atıfet Sunay (1903–2002), fifth First Lady of Turkey,
- Zati Sungur (1898–1984), stage magician
- Ferhan Şensoy (1951–2021), actor, playwright, theatre director and writer,
- Turgay Şeren (1932–2016), goalkeeper and football manager

=== T ===
- Naim Talu (1919–1998), economist, banker, politician and Prime minister
- Ali Tanrıyar (1914–2017), physician, politician, government minister and sports club president
- Abdülhak Hâmid Tarhan (1852–1937), poet and playwright
- Necdet Tosun (1926–1975), actor
- Erdal Tosun (1963–2016), actor
- Gürdal Tosun (1967–2000), actor
- Ahmet Kutsi Tecer (1901–1967), educator, poet and politician
- Talat Tunçalp (1915–2017), Olympian road cyclist,
- Yusuf Tunaoğlu (1946–2000), footballer
- Reha Oğuz Türkkan (1920–2010), writer
- İlter Türkmen (1927–2022), diplomat and politician
- Ali Tutal (1950–2026), film and televidision actor.

=== U–Ü ===
- Selçuk Uluergüven (1941–2014), theatre, film and television series actor
- Nejat Uygur (1927–2013), actor, comedian
- İlhan Usmanbaş (1921–2025), composer

=== Y ===
- Hakkı Yeten (1910–1989), footballer and coach of Beşiktaş J.K.
- Kerem Yilmazer (1945–2003), actor
