= Akinci =

Akinci or Akıncı may refer to:

== People ==
- Bülent Akinci, Turkish-German director and script writer
- Halil Akıncı, Turkish diplomat
- Mustafa Akıncı, Northern Cyprus president

- Naile Akıncı (1923–2014), Turkish female painter

== Other uses ==
- Akinji, irregular light cavalry of the Ottoman Empire's military
- Akıncı Air Base, Air Force base in Ankara, Turkey
- Bayraktar Akıncı, Turkish unmanned aerial vehicle
