= Fırat Kaplan =

Turkish footballer

Personal information
- Full name: Yusuf Fırat Kaplan
- Date of birth: 16 July 1998 (age 28)
- Place of birth: Yüksekova, Turkey
- Height: 1.76 m (5 ft 9 in)
- Position: Midfielder

Team information
- Current team: Ortaca Belediyespor

Youth career
- 2010–2012: Ceyhanspor
- 2012–2015: Adanaspor

Senior career*
| Years | Team | Apps | (Gls) |
| 2015–2019 | Adanaspor | 7 | (0) |
| 2018–2019 | → Kozan Belediye (loan) | 5 | (0) |
| 2020 | Ceyhanspor | | |
| 2021 | Adana 1954 FK | | |
| 2021–2022 | Sarıçam Kürkçülerspor | | |
| 2022– | Ortaca Belediyespor | | |
- * Club domestic league appearances and goals as of 4 May 2019

(born 16 July 1998) is a Turkish professional football player player who plays as a midfielder for amateur club Ortaca Belediyespor.

== Professional career ==
Fırat debuted for Adanaspor in a 4–3 TFF First League victory over Elazığspor on 16 May 2015. He made his professional debut in a 1–1 Süper Lig tie with Konyaspor on 19 May 2017.
