= Ulucami, Ahmetli =

Village in Turkey

Ulucami
- Neighbourhood
- Country: Turkey
- Province: Manisa
- District: Ahmetli
- Population (2024): 4,262
- Time zone: UTC+3 (TRT)

Ulucami is a neighbourhood in the municipality and district of Ahmetli, Manisa Province, Turkey. Its population is 4,262 (2024).
