= Müslüm Gürses =

Turkish arabesque singer and actor (1953–2013)

- Also known as: Müslüm Baba
- Born: Müslüm Akbaş; 7 May 1953; Fıstıközü, Halfeti, Şanlıurfa, Turkey
- Died: 3 March 2013 (aged 59) Istanbul, Turkey
- Genres: Arabesque; Turkish folk music
- Occupations: Singer; Lyricist; Composer; Actor
- Instruments: Bağlama, piano
- Years active: 1968–2013
- Labels: Elenor Müzik; Bayar Müzik; Universal Müzik; Pasaj Müzik; Ulus Müzik; Seyhan Müzik; Emre Plak; İdobay Müzik; Disco Plak
- Formerly of: Murathan Mungan, Teoman, Duman, Ali Osman Erbaşı, Burhan Bayar, Ferdi Tayfur, Yunus Bülbül, Hakkı Bulut
- Website: www.muslumgurses.com.tr

Müslüm Gürses (pronounced [mysˈlym ɟyɾˈses]; 7 May 1953 – 3 March 2013), born Müslüm Akbaş and called Müslüm Baba (literally: Father Müslüm), was a popular Turkish arabesque singer and actor.

== Personal life ==
He was born on 7 May 1953 in an adobe hut in the Turkmen village of Fıstıközü in Halfeti district of Şanlıurfa Province, southeastern Turkey. His mother was Emine, his father Mehmet, a farmer. Müslüm was only three years old when the family migrated to Adana due to financial problems.

At the age of 13, Müslüm was singing in the cotton fields he was working in. In his childhood, he also worked as a tailor's and a cobbler's apprentice. In 1967, he participated and won the title of a song contest organized by Adana Family-friendly Tea Garden. He then began to perform at Radio Çukurova. During this time, he adopted the surname Gürses, which means literally "stentorian voice".

In 1978, during a trip from Tarsus, Mersin to Adana, he was involved in a car accident. The crash scene was so terrible that he was assumed dead as he was pulled off the wreck, and therefore taken to the morgue instead of the hospital. After discovered by chance that he was alive, he was treated and underwent cranioplasty, getting a metal plate implemented for skull repair.

Another tragedy he experienced was that in addition to his brother's murder, his father murdered his mother. Mehmet Akbaş remarried after he was released from prison. However, Müslüm Gürses remained all the time silent and resentful because of his father's doing.

In 1980, Müslüm Gürses was on a concert tour in Malatya, where Muhterem Nur (1932–2020) already a well-known movie actress and singer, shared the stage with him. They started a quarrel during the evening. This became the beginning of the ever-lasting love between the two. The couple got married following after four years in 1986. He was her second husband.

== Career ==
From 1967 on, he performed live türkü, Turkish folk songs, regularly on Saturdays within the state-owned radio station of TRT Adana-Çukurova. His debut record single "Emmioğlu/Ovada Taşa Basma" was released in 1968. The next year in 1969, he already landed a hit record titled "Sevda Yüklü Kervanlar/Vurma Güzel Vurma" released by Palandöken Records in Istanbul, which sold 300,000 copies.

After completing his conscription, he returned to Istanbul and successfully continued to record folk songs. He had 13 singles by label Palandöken, four by Bestefon, 15 by Hülya Records and finally two by Çin Çin Records. Müslüm Gürses stepped into Yeşilçam in the heyday of fanciful arabesque music, and starred in 38 movies singing songs in most of them.

Later in his life, Gürses's interest started to shift toward other musical genres. He included pop and rock music to his repertory, singing such titles as "Olmadı Yar" of Nilüfer, "Paramparça" of Teoman and "İkimizin Yerine" of Tarkan. Gürses' joint project with writer Murathan Mungan, "Aşk Tesadüfleri Sever", which took 2 years to prepare, took its place in music markets on April 18, 2006, under the Pasaj Music label. He sang songs written by Mungan and composed by many foreign musicians, from David Bowie to Garbage, from Leonard Cohen to Bob Dylan, from Rainbow to Björk and Jane Birkin.

Müslüm Gürses mainly sang Turkish folk and Ottoman classical music in arabesque style. In his songs, he primarily expressed sorrow and painful feelings. He is considered a cult figure of Turkish folk music, and has a very dedicated group of fans, most of whom being young, low-income urban people, who call him "Müslüm Baba'" ("Papa Müslüm") affectionately.

Gürses had maybe the most interesting audience. At a time, his fans used to cut and bleed themselves using razor blades during his concerts. This phenomenon led to Müslüm Gürses becoming a subject of scientific research at universities. For this reason, even intellectuals began to take an interest in him during the late 1990s.

== Health complications and death ==
In November 2012, it was announced that Gürses was in critical condition following a heart bypass surgery he had undergone recently. On 3 March 2013 at 10:30, he died due to complications with his surgery and declining health during post-operative care. He had been in the intensive care unit continuously since his surgery. After a memorial ceremony held at the Cemal Reşit Rey Concert Hall the next day and subsequent religious funeral in the Teşvikiye Mosque, he was buried at the Zincirlikuyu Cemetery.

== Works ==
=== Filmography ===
- İsyankar – 1979
- Bağrı Yanık – 1980
- İtirazım Var – 1980
- Hasret – 1980
- Kul Sevdası – 1980
- Zeytin Gözlüm – 1980
- Mutlu Ol Yeter – 1981
- Anlatamadım – 1983
- Ağlattı Kader – 1984
- Bir Yıldız Doğuyor – 1984
- Çare Sende Allah'ım – 1984
- Garibanlar – 1984
- Sev Yeter – 1984
- Güldür Yüzümü – 1985
- İkizler – 1985
- Kul Kuldan Beter – 1985
- Yaranamadım – 1985
- Beleşçiler – 1986
- Çığlık – 1986
- Seher Vakti – 1986
- Töre – 1986
- Yıkıla Yıkıla – 1986
- Kader Rüzgarı – 1986
- Kısmetin En Güzeli – 1986
- Küskünüm – 1986
- Oğlum – 1987
- Talihsizler – 1987
- Sevmemeli – 1988
- Yalnızlık Korkusu – 1988
- Dertler İnsanı – 1990
- Dünya Boştur – 1990
- Bir Akıllı Bir Deli – 2002
- Muhabbet Kuşları – 2002
- Can Kardesler –
- Ömerçip – 2002
- Balans ve Manevra – 2005
- Amerikalılar Karadeniz'de 2 – 2006
- Esrarlı Gözler – 2008
- Şov Bizinıs – 2011

=== Composer ===
- Ağır abi (2011)
- Yaşlı Gözlerin Üstadı – Kul (2013)

=== Discography ===
Year	Title	Production	Notes
1975	Müslüm Gürses 1	Çınçın Plak	
1976	Müslüm Gürses 2	Çınçın Plak	
1977	Müslüm Gürses 3	Çınçın Plak	
1978	Müslüm Gürses 4	Çınçın Plak	
1979	Gazla Şoför	Çınçın Plak	
1979	Bağrıyanık	Saner Plak	
1980	Esrarlı Gözler	Emre Plak	
1981	Mutlu Ol Yeter	Modern Plak	
1982	Müzik Ziyafeti	Akdeniz Plak	
1982	Tanrı İstemezse	Uzay Plak	
1983	Anlatamadım	Kale Plakçılık	
1984	Yaranamadım	Elenor Müzik	
1985	Güldür Yüzümü	Elenor Müzik	
1986	Sevda Yolu	Elenor Müzik	
1986	Yıkıla Yıkıla	Elenor Müzik	
1986	Gitme	Elenor Müzik	
1986	Küskünüm	Bayar Müzik	
1987	Talihsizler	Elenor Müzik	
1988	Aldatılanlar	Özbir Plak	
1988	Dertler İnsanı	Elenor Müzik	
1988	Vefasız Alem	Elenor Müzik	
1988	Maziden Bir Demet	Sedef Müzik	
1989	Bir Fırtına Kopacak	Akdeniz Plak	
1989	Bir Kadeh Daha Ver	Sarp Müzik	
1989	Mahsun Kul	Elenor Müzik	
1989	Müslüm Gürses Konseri	Elenor Müzik	Live album
1990	Meyhaneci / Kırık Sazım	Elenor Müzik	
1990	Hüzünlü Günler	Disco Plak	
1990	Arkadaş Kurbanıyım	Uğur Plak	
1990	Güle Güle Git	Bayar Müzik	
1991	Bir Bilebilsen / Zalim	Bayar Müzik	
1991	Sen Nerdesin Ben Nerdeyim	Bayar Müzik	
1991	Yüreğimden Vurdun Beni	Sarp Müzik	
1991	Bir de Benden Dinleyin	Elenor Müzik	
1991	Her Şey Yalan	Elenor Müzik	
1992	Müslümce 92	Elenor Müzik	
1993	Dağlarda Kar Olsaydım	Elenor Müzik	
1994	Senden Vazgeçmem	Elenor Müzik	
1994	İnsaf - Kahire Resitali	Uğur Plak	
1995	Benim Meselem	Elenor Müzik	
1995	Bir Avuç Gözyaşı	Elenor Müzik	
1996	Topraktan Bedene (İsyanım Var)	Elenor Müzik	
1997	Sultanım	İdobay	
1997	Usta - Ne Yazar	Elenor Müzik	
1997	Nerelerdesin	Elenor Müzik	
1998	Müslüm Gürses Klasikleri	Elenor Müzik	
1999	Arkadaşım	Elenor Müzik	
1999	Garipler	Elenor Müzik	
1999	Vay Canım	Ulus Müzik	
2000	Biz Babadan Böyle Gördük	Ulus Müzik	
2000	Zavallım	Elenor Müzik	
2001	Müslümce Türküler	Elenor Müzik	
2001	Sadece	Elenor Müzik	
2001	Yanlış Yaptım (Kaçamam Ki Kaderimden)	Özdemir Plak	
2001	Dünya Yalan	Universal	
2002	Açık Hava Konseri - 1	Universal	Live album
2002	Açık Hava Konseri - 2	Universal	Live album
2002	Açık Hava Konseri - 3	Universal	Live album
2002	Müslüm Baba ile Yolculuk	Universal	
2002	Paramparça	Bayar Müzik	
2003	Yanarım	Bayar Müzik	
2003	İkimizin Yerine	Dirlik Müzik	
2004	Uyanma Zamanı (Kıyak Bitti)	Kadırga Müzik	
2005	Ayrılık Acı Bir Şey	Görüntüevi	
2005	Bakma	Sun Müzik	
2006	Gönül Teknem	Seyhan Müzik	
2006	Aşk Tesadüfleri Sever	Pasaj Müzik	
2009	Sandık	Pasaj Müzik	
2010	Yalan Dünya	Pasaj Müzik	
2013	Veda - Ervah-ı Ezelde	Kadırga Müzik	
