= Ali Tutal =

Turkish actor (1950–2026)

Ali Tutal (17 June 1950 – 22 February 2026) was a Turkish actor.

== Life and career ==
Tutal was born in Diyarbakır in June 1950. He began his career in advertising. He started his cinema career in 1976 with the movie Permission.

Throughout his career, he starred in over 50 feature films and television series, including On Fertile Lands (1980), Hemşo (2000) and Home Coming (2006).

== Death ==
Tutal had an intracerebral hemorrhage in January 2026. He died in the hospital, where he was treated, at the age of 75 on 22 February 2026. He was buried at Zincirlikuyu Cemetery following a memorial ceremony in the Atlas Cinema and the religious service in the Zincirlikuyu Mosque.
