= Barbaros, Ahmetli =

Village in Turkey

Barbaros
- Neighbourhood
- Country: Turkey
- Province: Manisa
- District: Ahmetli
- Population (2024): 2,408
- Time zone: UTC+3 (TRT)

Barbaros is a neighbourhood in the municipality and district of Ahmetli, Manisa Province, Turkey. Its population is 2,408 (2024).
