= Fahire Fersan =

Turkish kemençe virtuosa

Fahire Fersan (1900 – 3 January 1997) was a Turkish female classical kemençe virtuosa.

== Private life ==
Fahire Fersan was born to Faik Bey and his spouse Şem'inur Hanım in Istanbul, then Ottoman Empire in 1900. Her father was the chamberlain of Ottoman sultan Abdul Hamid II (reigned 1876–1909). Her sister Faize Ergin became later a tambur virtuosa.

She married Refik Fersan (1895–1963), a Turkish classical music composer and tambur virtuoso. She gave birth to two sons Hayrettin, İmran and three daughters Melek, Firuzan, Emine.

Fahire Fersan died in Istanbul on 3 January 1997. She was interred at Zincirlikuyu Cemetery following the religious funeral service held at Levent Mosque.

== Musician career ==
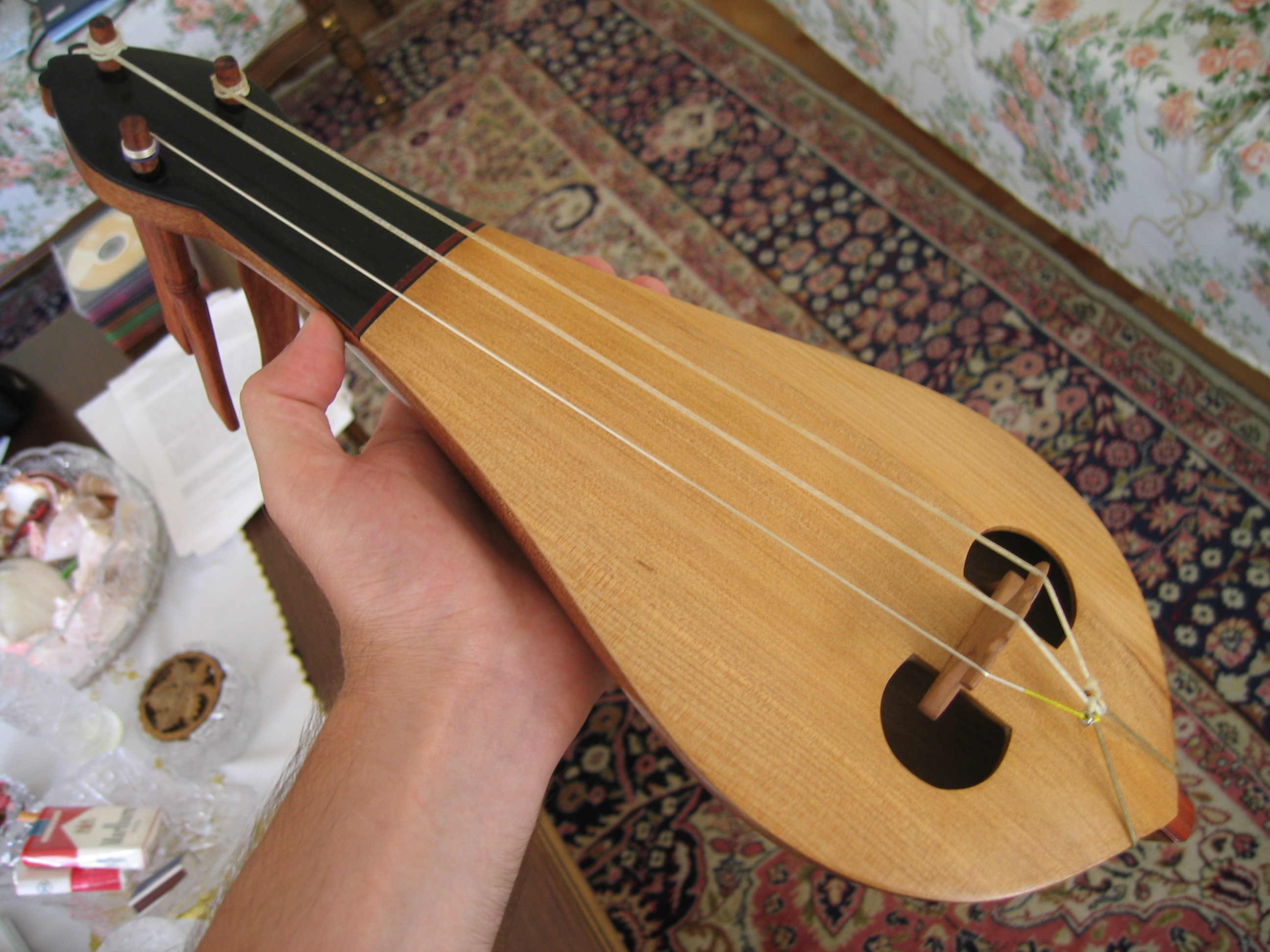
A classical kemençe.

She started her musician career at an early age by taking classical kemençe lessons from Tamburi Cemil Bey (1873–1916). After her marriage, the couple went to Switzerland, where she had to interrupt her musical education. She resumed her musical lessons following her return to Turkey, and continuing until the death of Cemil Bey.

She played the classical kemençe long time with her husband at the state-owned TRT radio in Ankara. Later, the couple performed at TRT Radio Istanbul, where they gave also lessons. She worked at the Istanbul Municipal Conservatory and at private radio stations as well.

She made many gramophone records along with her husband. She also accompanied Turkish classical music singer Münir Nurettin Selçuk at numerous concerts and recordings. She was a notable virtuosa, and was praised by poet Yahya Kemal Beyatlı as "All Istanbul starts to talk in her kemençe".
