= Kendirlik, Ahmetli =

Village in Turkey

Kendirlik
- Neighbourhood
- Location in Turkey Kendirlik (Turkey Aegean)
- Coordinates: 38°32′54″N 27°59′17″E
- Country: Turkey
- Province: Manisa
- District: Ahmetli
- Population (2024): 267
- Time zone: UTC+3 (TRT)

Kendirlik is a neighbourhood in the municipality and district of Ahmetli, Manisa Province, Turkey. Its population is 267 (2024).
