= Güldede, Ahmetli =

Village in Turkey

Güldede
- Neighbourhood
- Country: Turkey
- Province: Manisa
- District: Ahmetli
- Population (2024): 624
- Time zone: UTC+3 (TRT)

Güldede is a neighbourhood in the municipality and district of Ahmetli, Manisa Province, Turkey. Its population is 624 (2024).
