= Vedat Uysal =

Turkish footballer (born 1962)

Personal information
- Date of birth: 3 November 1962
- Place of birth: Istanbul, Turkey
- Positions: Libero; central defender; left back; midfielder; forward

Team information
- Current team: Turkey national beach soccer team

Youth career
- 1979–1981: Galatasaray

Senior career*
Years	Team	Apps	(Gls)
1981–1982	Mersin İdman Yurdu		
1983–1984	Vefa Simtel		
1984–1989	Eskişehirspor		
1989–1990	Sakaryaspor	5	
1989–1990	→ Fenerbahçe (loan)		
1990–1992	Karşıyaka		
1992–1996	Sakaryaspor		
1996–1997	Yeşilova		

International career
	Turkey National Army Football Team	3	
- * Club domestic league appearances and goals

Vedat Uysal (born 3 November 1962) is a Turkish former football player and now manager, currently coaches Turkey national beach soccer team.

== Playing career ==
Uysal began his career in 1979 at Galatasaray Youth Team, after two years he moved to Mersin İdman Yurdu and played for a season there. Then, he joined 2nd league team Vefa Simtel for two seasons. His performance earned him a transfer to Eskişehirspor in 1984. He played 4 seasons at Eskişehirspor, and also fulfilled his army duty during his spell and was selected for the Turkish national army football team.

In 1987, Eskişehirspor reached the Turkish Cup final, but lost to Gençlerbirliği. On later season, they clutched the Turkish Prime Ministership Cup (a defunct cup) by beating Beşiktaş. Subsequently, he joined Sakaryaspor in 1989–90 season. He played five times for this team and finalized the season before joining to Fenerbahçe on loan, where the team captured the second place and won the Prisendency Cup (a defunct cup). In 1990–91 season, he joined Karşıyaka and spent 1.5 year before his transfer to Sakaryaspor again. He played 4.5 years for this team and then retired.

== Club team ==
Premier League:

- Second (1): 1989–90 (with Fenerbahçe)

Turkey Cup:

- Second (2): 1982–83 (with Mersin İdman Yurdu), 1986–87 (with Eskisehirspor)

Presidential Cup: 1

- 1990 (with Fenerbahçe)

Prime Minister's Cup: 1

- 1987 (with Eskisehirspor)

== Managerial career ==
Uysal is now the coach of Turkey national beach soccer team, besides the Sakarya regional technical authority of TFF.

ESBL Preliminary Event, Athens, Greece: 2007

In late June 2008, Turkey beach soccer team participated in a private cup, Challenge Cup, held in Netanya, Israel. They achieved 3rd place after the play-off match against Norway. Challenge Cup, Netanya, Israel: 2008 -3rd place

BSWW Euro League Stage 2, Tignes (French Alps), France: 2008

Challenge Cup, The Hague, Netherlands: 2010 Champions

Lisbon, Portugal promoted to Division A in Turkey: 2010 Champions

== Coaching qualifications and participation in seminars ==
- 1998 – A Course, Manisa
- 2000 – Trainer Development Seminar, Sakarya
- 2002 – Trainer Development Seminar, Sakarya
- 2004 – Trainer Development Seminar, Sakarya
- 2005 – Technical Director, Training, Istanbul
- 2007 – Technical Director, Seminar, Antalya
- 2007 – 20th Technical Director for International Development Seminar, Antalya
- 2007 – FIFA Beach Soccer Region Europe Seminar, Cesme- İzmir
- 2009 – 21 International Coach Development Congress, Antalya
- 2011 – 22 International Coach Development Congress, Antalya
