= Muhterem Nur =

Turkish actress and singer (1932–2020)

- Born: Aysel Muhterem Kısa; 31 December 1932; Bitola, Kingdom of Yugoslavia (today North Macedonia)
- Died: 20 March 2020 (aged 87); Istanbul, Turkey
- Occupations: Actress, singer
- Years active: 1951–2019
- Spouse(s): Işın Kaan (1961–1963); Müslüm Gürses (1986–2013)
- Awards: 1972 4th Golden Boll Film Festival Best Supporting Actress Award; 1998 17th International Istanbul Film Festival Honor Award; 2003 40th Golden Orange Film Festival Life Achievement Award; 2008 3rd Silk Road Film Festival Honor Award

Muhterem Nur (née Aysel Muhterem Kısa; 31 December 1932 – 20 March 2020) was a Turkish film actress and pop music singer.

== Personal life ==
She was born as Aysel Kısa on December 31, 1932, in Bitola (Turkish: Manastır), Vardar Banovina, Kingdom of Yugoslavia. She lost her 16-year-old mother at her birth and never knew her father. She was raised by her maternal aunt, whom she called "mother". She was renamed "Olga" as a result of Yugoslavian regime's assimilation campaign. All ethnic Turks and other Muslims in Yugoslavia were forced to adopt Christian names and renounce all Muslim customs.

In her infancy, she immigrated with her family members to Turkey and settled in Tekirdağ, northwestern Turkey. Later, due to financial problems, the family moved in 1942 to Istanbul to live in a small house at Eyüp district.

On the new identity card issued by the Turkish Government, she was named Aysel Muhterem Kısa. She spent her childhood in Eyüp, where she attended the primary school. After finishing the school, she began to work in a factory. Then, by chance, she got to know Suzan Yakar Rutkay, a notable female singer and partner of that time's biggest film production company, Halk Film. She helped Muhterem Nur step into cinema.

In 1961, Muhterem Nur married Işın Kaan (1937–1992), a journalist and actor. The couple divorced in 1963. She dated celebrities, such as movie directors Memduh Ün and Ümit Utku, and actors Yılmaz Duru, actors Cihat Aşkın and Efkan Efekan.

In 1982, she met Müslüm Gürses (1953–2013), a talented folk singer at that time, during a concert tour in Malatya, where she shared the stage with him. They started a quarrel the first evening. This also became the beginning of an ever-lasting deep love between the two. The couple got married in private, following four-years together, on May 5, 1986. Her husband died on March 3, 2013, following a heart bypass surgery he underwent in November 2012.

Muhterem Nur died on 20 March 2020 at the İstinye State Hospital.

== Career ==
Muhterem Nur debuted in cinema as a background actress in the 1951 movie, Yıldızlar Revüsü ("Revue of Stars"). She continued to play in movies as an extra, earning five times more than she received in the factory. She played as supporting actress in more than twenty movies before she got a lead role in the 1958 movie, Üç Arkadaş, in which she portrayed a blind girl. In the film directed by Memduh Ün, which became very successful, she shared the lead role with Fikret Hakan (born 1934). Thanks to her baby like face and naive acting artistry, she was rooted suddenly in the hearts of cinema fans, and climbed up the ladders very quickly.

Despite rising up to main actress roles in a very short time and playing in many movies, Muhterem Nur had difficulties continuing in cinema due to change of the era in movie themes during the period between 1965 and 1967. From 1965 on, she vocationally performed dancing and, from 1967, took the stage as a singer in low-priced music halls. In 1967, she was jailed for ten days because of unpaid bills. She confessed that once, in 1972, she was so destitute, she was unable to even buy a simit, Turkish bagel.

Muhterem Nur returned to cinema and starred sparsely in movies until 2002. Muhterem Nur is considered the first real star of Turkish cinema. She portrayed the ignored and discriminated-against woman, digressing from role of the bourgeoisie woman. She was known as the Yeşilçam's most weepy actress, who at the same time drew tears and made spectators tear handkerchiefs. Even though it is not documented, she is one of the most important female figures of Turkish cinema due to the box office record of her films shot in the 1950s and 1960s.

== Works ==
=== Television series ===
- Yuva (1990)
- Dokuzuncu Hariciye Koğuşu (1985)
- Denizin Kanı (1978)

=== Television films ===
- Bir Akıllı Bir Deli (2002)
- Kuşlu Çorap (1988)

=== Cinema films ===
- Esrarlı Gözler (2008)
- Küskünüm (1986)
- İkizler (1985)
- Sev Yeter (1984)
- Son Akın (1982)
- Zeytin Gözlüm (1980)
- Ayyaş (1974)
- Eski Kurtlar (1974)
- Bacım (1974)
- Kaderim (1973)
- Şehvet Kurbanı (1972)
- Gecekondu Rüzgarı (1972)
- Kara Gün (1971)
- Öksüz Gülnaz (1970)
- Sevenler Ölmez (1970)
- Babaların Günahı (1970)
- Yanık Kezban (1970)
- Dağlar Kızı Reyhan (1969)
- Kanlı Gelinlik (1969)
- Yiğit Anadolu'dan Çıkar (1969)
- Şen Ola Düğün Şen Ola (1969)
- İki Günahsız Kız (1969)
- Ana Mezarı (1969)
- Yılın Kadını Değil (1969)
- Bana Derler Fosforlu (1969)
- Eşkiya Kanı (Hakimo) (1968)
- Kara Gözlüm Efkarlanma (1968)
- Kabadayı (1968)
- Urfa İstanbul (1968)
- Kanunsuz Toprak (1967)
- Ali'yi Gördüm Ali'yi (1967)
- Ecelin Geldi Yavrum (1967)
- Erkek Adam Sözünde Durur (1967)
- Nemli Dudaklar (1967)
- Sevda (1967)
- Kocadağlı (1967)
- Garipler Sokağı (1967)
- Zalimler (1966)
- İçimdeki Alev (1966)
- Yiğit Yaralı Olur (1966)
- Veysel Karani (1965)
- Yaralı Kartal (1965)
- Ekmek Kavgası (1965)
- Şeker Hafiye (1965)
- Hazreti Eyüb'ün Sabrı (1965)
- Dağ Çiçeği (1965)
- Çapkınlar Kralı (1965)
- Erkekler Ağlamaz (1964)
- Fabrikanın Gülü (1964)
- Koçero (1964)
- Isdırap Çocukları (1964)
- Paylaşılmayan Sevgili (1964)
- Hayat Kavgası (1964)
- Yüz Karası (1964)
- Manyaklar Köşkü (1964)
- Kaldırımlar Üstünde (1964)
- Nem Alacak Felek Benim (1964)
- Altın Kelepçe (1964)
- Anne / Çok Gördü Felek (1964)
- Baba Hasreti (1964)
- Güzel Kadınlar Çetesi + 1964
- Günah Bende mi (1964)
- Son Karar (1964)
- Beni Osman Öldürdü (1963)
- Çapraz Delikanlı (1963)
- Kezban (1963)
- Ali Derler Adıma (1963)
- Yaralı Ceylan (1963)
- Bir Öpücük Ver Bana (1963)
- Can Pazarı (1963)
- Ölüme Çeyrek Var (1963)
- Nişan Yüzüğü (1963)
- Kızlar Büyüdü (1963)
- Ayşecik Fakir Prenses (1963)
- Yolcu (1963)
- Çifte Kumrular (1962)
- Ağlama Sevgilim (1962)
- Aşk Bekliyor (1962)
- Belki Bir Sabah Geleceksin (1962)
- Beş Kardeştiler (1962)
- Derdimden Anlayan Yok (1962)
- Çiğdem (1962)
- Genç Osman (1962)
- Gurbet Yolcuları (1962)
- Meteliksiz Aşıklar (1962)
- Kader Yollarımızı Ayırıyor (1962)
- Kayıp Kız Ayla (1962)
- Kelle Koltukta (1962)
- Köyün Güzeli (1962)
- Mağrur Kadın (1962)
- İki Yetime (1961)
- Yavru Kuş (1961)
- Bitmeyen Mücadele (1961)
- Biz İnsan Değil miyiz (1961)
- Çılgın Aşk (1961)
- Derbeder / Kırık Aşk (1961)
- Gönlüm Yaralı (1961)
- İnleyen Dağlar (1961)
- Kadın Asla Unutmaz (1961)
- Yaman Gazeteci (1961)
- Ölüm Film Çekiyor (1961)
- Sabırtaşı (1961)
- Seni Benden Alamazlar (1961)
- Yedi Günlük Aşk (1961)
- Unutamadığım Kadın (1961)
- Külkedisi (1961)
- Hancı (1961)
- Yeşil Kurbağalar (1960)
- Ayşecik (1960)
- Ayşem Kınalı Gelin (1960)
- Can Mustafa (1960)
- Mahallenin Sevgilisi (1960)
- Meryem (1960)
- Şeytan Kız (1960)
- Talihsiz Yavru (1960)
- Yak Bir Sigara (1960)
- Ateşten Damla (1960)
- Ben Bir Günahsızım (1959)
- Ben Kahpe Değilim (1959)
- Kaderim Böyle İmiş (1959)
- Son Yolcu (1959)
- Üç Kızın Hikayesi (1959)
- Aşk Rüyası (1959)
- Aşkın Acıları (1959)
- Aşkın Gözyaşları / Şoför Ömer (1959)
- Aşık Garip / Köy Güzeli (1958)
- Ayşe'nin Çilesi (1958)
- Çoban Kızı (1958)
- Funda (1958)
- Acı Sevda (1958)
- Üç Arkadaş (1958)
- Gelin Ayşem (1957)
- Ceylan Emine (1957)
- Zeynebin Aşkı / Güllü Fatma (1957)
- Ham Meyva (1957)
- Yavrularımın Katili (1957)
- Yetim Ömer (1957)
- Annemin Gözyaşları (1957)
- Köy Canavarı (1956)
- Piç / Kahpe Dünya (1956)
- Sazlı Damın Kahpesi (1956)
- Yetimler Ahı (1956)
- Bırakın Yaşayalım (1956)
- Zeynep'ın İntikamı (1956)
- Kaybolan Gençlik (1955)
- Hayatımı Mahveden Kadın (1955)
- Izdırap Şarkısı (1955)
- Karacaoğlan (1955)
- Günahkar Baba (1955)
- Kara Sevda (1955)
- Yetim Yavrular (1955)
- Canlı Karagöz / Mihriban Sultan (1954)
- Nasreddin Hoca (1954)
- Ölüme Giden Yol (1954)
- Son Şarkı (1954)
- Bu Nasıl Aşk (1953)
- Cinci Hoca (1953)
- Kara Davut (1953)
- Kezban (1953)
- Sarı Zeybek (1953)
- Boş Beşik (1952)
- İstanbul Havası / Arşak Sulukule'de (1952)
- Sabahsız Geceler (1952)
- Söz Müdafaanındır (1952)
- Yıldızlar Revüsü (1952)
- Kore'de Türk Kahramanları (1951)
- Beni Mahvettiler (1951)
