= Ahmetli =

- District and municipality
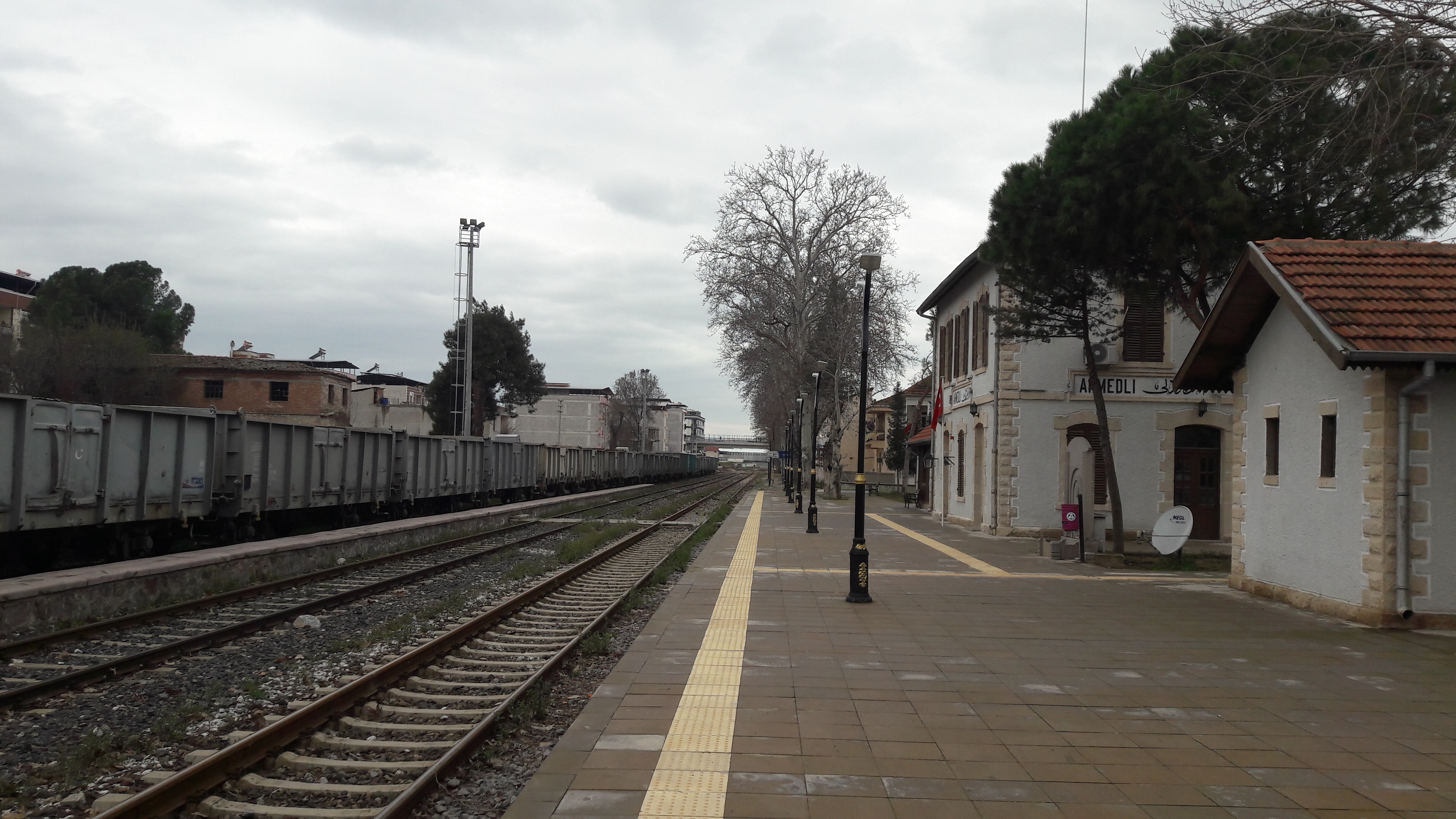
- Ahmetli railway station

- Map showing Ahmetli District in Manisa Province

- Location within Turkey Location within Turkey Aegean
- Coordinates: 38°31′06″N 27°56′19″E
- Country: Turkey
- Province: Manisa

Government
  - Mayor: Fuat Mintaş (CHP)
- Area: 227 km^{2} (88 sq mi)
- Elevation: 90 m (300 ft)
- Population (2022): 16,963
  - Density: 74.7/km^{2} (194/sq mi)
- Time zone: UTC+3 (TRT)
- Postal code: 45450
- Area code: 0236
- Climate: Csa
- Website: www.ahmetli.bel.tr

Ahmetli is a municipality and district of Manisa Province, Turkey. Its area is 227 km^{2}, and its population is 16,963 (2022). The town lies at an elevation of 90 m (295 ft), near the river Gediz.

== History ==
By the end of Greek Invasion of Anatolia, Ahmetli and all its surrounding villages were burned by the retreating Greek forces. The Greek soldier Giannis Koutsonicolas from Arahova describes the events with the following words;

in the evening we left and passing through Ahmetli we burned it, as well as all the villages, marching all night, and almost in the morning we reached Kasaba which was being burned, as well as Çobanisa and Manisa and all the villages.

— Yiannis Koutsonicolas

== Composition ==
There are 23 neighbourhoods in Ahmetli District:

- Alahıdır
- Altıeylül
- Ataköy
- Bahçecik
- Barbaros
- Canbazlı
- Dereköy
- Derici
- Dibekdere
- Gökkaya
- Güldede
- Hacıköseli
- Halilkahya
- Karaköy
- Kargın
- Kendirlik
- Kestelli
- Kurtuluş
- Mandallı
- Seydiköy
- Ulucami
- Yaraşlı
- Zafer
