= Gündüz Tekin Onay =

Turkish football player and coach (1942–2008)

Personal information
- Date of birth: 31 May 1942
- Place of birth: Çankırı, Turkey
- Date of death: 4 January 2008 (aged 65)
- Position: Midfielder

Senior career*
Years	Team	Apps	(Gls)
1957–?	Eskişehirspor		
- Bursa Akınspor
- Karabükspor
- Muhafızgücü
- Karşıyaka
- Şekerspor
- Kastamonuspor

International career
- National Army Football Team

Managerial career
- 1968–: Kastamonuspor
- Turkey (assistant coach)
- Adanaspor
- 1975: Zonguldakspor
- 1975–1976: Beşiktaş
- 1977–1979: Zonguldakspor
- 1980–1981: Adanaspor
- 1981–1982: Bursaspor
- 1982–1983: Mersin İdmanyurdu
- 1984: Adana Demirspor
- 1984–1985: Ankaragücü
- 1986: Kayserispor
- 1986–1987: Zonguldakspor
- 1988–1989: Adanaspor
- 1989: Gençlerbirliği
- 1992–1993: Denizlispor
- 1994: Konyaspor
- 1994–1996: Adanaspor
- * Club domestic league appearances and goals

Gündüz Tekin Onay (31 May 1942 – 4 January 2008) was a Turkish footballer and coach who also trained Istanbul club Beşiktaş between 1976 and 1977. He is known for his success in discovering starlets and for his modesty. Additionally, he was the author of a system to explore and breed young talents for Turkish football.

== Playing career ==
Onay was born in Çankırı. He began his professional career in 1957 as a player of Eskişehirspor. Respectively he played for Bursa Akınspor, Kardemir Karabükspor, Muhafızgücü, Karşıyaka, Şekerspor and Kastamonuspor beside National Army Football.

== Managerial career ==
Onay began to manage when he was 26 with coaching Kastamonuspor in 1968. Afterward, he became the assistant of Abdullah Gegiç for National Team in 1969. He maintained this duty until 1972 as an employer of TFF. Onay entered Turkish League as the coach of Adanaspor at the age of 30. He worked in numerous teams for non-stop 21 years, which is record in Turkish football history as total of 462 matches. He coached successively Zonguldakspor, Beşiktaş, Bursaspor, Mersin İdmanyurdu, Ankaragücü, Kayserispor, Gençlerbirliği, Adana Demirspor alongside Konyaspor, Denizlispor when the teams were competing in Division 2. He was also chairman of Adanaspor.

== Later life ==
After ending his managerial career, he contributed the Turkish football in different cases, including the top-adviser function of TFF as well as general co-ordinator of the Researching, Planning, Education and improvement Department (ARPEG). During his task, he created Van Football Village Project, which aimed to gather and train youngsters from different cities, and compose a synthesis of eastern and western Turkish football.

After UNESCO declared 2007 as Year of Rumi, he achieved the clemency and example behaviour prize by Turkish Football Coaches Association. Additionally in 2007, he was awarded the special Namık Sevik Prize after the 54th annual Sportsmen of the Year survey of daily newspaper Milliyet.

Onay worked as a sports columnist various newspapers and was the author of 14 books devoted to football.

== Personal life and death ==
Onay was married and had one daughter and one son. His son Güntekin Onay, is a well known Turkish sports commentator who currently works for Turkish TV station NTV.

Onay died in Istanbul, Turkey due to cancer during his treatment period. He was inferred on 5 January 2008 in Zincirlikuyu Cemetery in Istanbul. There were several sports persons at his funeral such as UEFA vice president Şenes Erzik, former TFF president Haluk Ulusoy, Turkey manager Fatih Terim, Sivasspor chairman Mecnun Otyakmaz, and national footballer Emre Belözoğlu.
