= Metin Aydın =

Turkish footballer (born 1993)

Personal information
- Full name: Metin Aydın
- Date of birth: 6 March 1993 (age 33)
- Place of birth: Ankara, Turkey
- Position: Defender

Youth career
- 2005–2011: Ankaragücü

Senior career*
Years	Team	Apps	(Gls)
2011–2017	Ankaragücü	48	(0)
2015	→ Hatayspor (loan)	2	(0)
2016	→ Etimesgut Belediyespor (loan)	5	(0)
2017–2018	Adliyespor	4	(0)
2018–2019	Ankara DSİ	19	(1)
2019–2020	Kırşehir Belediyespor	7	(0)
2020	Altındağ Spor	1	(0)

International career
2010	Turkey U17	14	(0)
2010	Turkey U18	2	(0)
- * Club domestic league appearances and goals as of 12:33, 12 October 2020 (UTC)

Metin Aydın (born 6 March 1993) is a Turkish footballer who plays as a defender. He made his Süper Lig debut on 1 February 2012.
