= Naile Akıncı =

Turkish painter (1923–2014)

- Born: 1 July 1923; Van, Turkey
- Died: 2 April 2014 (aged 90); Istanbul, Turkey
- Resting place: Zincirlikuyu Cemetery
- Known for: Landscape painting
- Children: 1

Naile Akıncı (1 July 1923–2 April 2014) was a Turkish landscape painter. She was one of the first female painters of the Republican Era. She was known for her paintings of Istanbul"s Eyüp and Golden Horn. She worked as a school teacher.

== Painting career ==
Between 1953 and 1979, she participated in the exhibitions of the Turkish Painters' Society (Turkish: Türk Ressamlar Cemiyeti), between 1954 and 1981 in the State Painting and Sculpture Exhibitions, and in over three hundred group exhibitions organized by various groups within the country. She attracted attention with the exhibition she opened at the Istanbul City Gallery in 1964. She participated in contemporary Turkish painting exhibitions held in many countries. With her works selected by the Ministry of Culture and Tourism and the Ministry of Foreign Affairs, she represented Turkey in 14 international exhibitions held abroad.

Akıncı is known in Turkish painting, particularly for her "Eyüp Variations", which incorporate contemporary and original elements that go beyond the traditional understanding of landscape painting. Her works are included in the National Library Collection. Although she never lived in Eyüp, she produced works depicting Eyüp and the Golden Horn over a 60-year period starting in 1953. Her son believes that "her interest in this area stems from artistic and psychological reasons. Her desire to reconnect with her mother, whom she lost when she was only 13, and with whom she frequently visited the tomb of Eyüp Sultan, guided her psychologically. More importantly, the powerful and complex nature of Eyüp and the Golden Horn, which compels an artist to interpret them, influenced her artistically." She also painted locations in Kadıköy and the scenery at Kadıköy's waterfront.

In 1988, she received the "Republic of Turkey Ministry of Culture Honorary Award" for her 50th year in art and her contributions to Turkish painting.

In commemoration of the 100th anniversary of her birth, her works were on display in 2023 in a comprehensive exhibition titled "A Story of Selfhood: Naile Akıncı (1953–2013) Retrospective" at the Museum Gasworks in Kadıköy, Istanbul.

Painting and sculpture museums in Istanbul, Ankara, İzmir, National Library of Turkey, fine arts galleries in Bolu, Çorum, Erzurum, Embassy of Turkey,Beijing, collections of Akbank, Halkbank, Şekerbank, İşbank and many private collections own her works. Her paintings are included in private collections abroad, in Germany, the United States, Greece, Israel, the Netherlands, and France. Her works were accepted to represent Turkey in 14 international exhibitions held abroad, and she has been awarded seven international prizes.

Among her significant international awards are: the Grand International Prize at the 10th Clermont-Ferrand Contemporary Art Exhibition (1974), the Special Jury Prize at the 11th Vichy Biennial (1976), the First Royal Honorable Mention at the International Charleroi Exhibition held to commemorate the 150th Anniversary of the Kingdom of Belgium (1979), and third prize among 200 painters from 50 countries, whose works were accepted at the 11th Trofeo Raffaello International Exhibition organized by the Modigliani Cultural Center in Milan (1986). In 1977, due to the consecutive international awards she had won, she was invited by name to the "Contemporary Women Painters Exhibition" organized by the Riom Mandet Museum in France, and two of her works were sent to this exhibition through the Ministry of Foreign Affairs. In 2003, she was named the "Honor Artist" at the Artist-Tüyap '13th Istanbul Art Fair. She won the Sedat "Simavi Award" in 2005 for her 41st solo painting exhibition, which opened at Evin Art Gallery.

== Personal life ==
Akıncı was born in Van, eastern Turkey on 1 July 1923.

She passed the entry exam of the State Academy of the Fine Arts in Istanbul (Turkish: Devlet Güzel Sanatlar Akademisi), today Mimar Sinan Fine Arts University, in 1938, and started to study painting, which she finished in 1943. She interrupted her further education for six years due to her illness. In 1949, she returned to the Academy, where she was a stıdent of Nurullah Berk (1906–198), Leopold Levy, Şefik Bursalı and also of Bedri Rahmi Eyüboğlu (1911–1975), of his personality and works she was very much impressed. In 1952, she completed her education in painting in the workshop of Zeki Kocamemi. She became one of the first female painters of the Republican Era.

As she was in the last year of her education, she gave birth to a son, Cengiz Akıncı.

She served as a teacher of drawing and art history in middle and high schools at Istanbul between 1952 and 1980.

In 1987, she moved to Kadıköy District of Istanbul. She spent the last 21 years of her life in her house-workshop at Fenerbahçe and Suadiye neighborhoods of Kadıköy. While doing paintings on canvas, she led an artistic life intertwined with young artists.

In her late years, Akıncı suffered from Parkinson's disease. She stated that her love of painting gave her the strength to overcome her illness. She died in Istanbul at the age of 90 on 2 April 2014. She was buried in the Zincirlikuyu Cemetery following the religious service held in the Zincirlikuyu Mosque on 4 April 2014.
