= Ceyhanspor =

Turkish football club

- Full name: Ceyhan Spor Kulübü
- Ground: Ceyhan İlçe Stadi
- Capacity: 3,930
- Coordinates: 37°01′44″N 35°48′45″E
- Chairman: Hüseyin Can

Ceyhan Spor Kulübü was a Turkish football club based in Ceyhan, Adana Province. The club played in Group 1 of the Turkish Third League in 2008–09 season and was expelled the league by TFF due to fixing match accusation with Mezitlispor in 2008–09 and relegated to Adana Super Amateur League. They also played old Second League between 1981 and 1984.
