= Şenol Çorlu =

Turkish footballer (born 1958)

Personal information
- Date of birth: 3 December 1961 (age 64)
- Place of birth: Ankara, Turkey
- Position: Midfielder

Youth career
- Petrol Ofisi

Senior career*
| Years | Team | Apps | (Gls) |
| 1978–1979 | Petrol Ofisi | | |
| 1979–1981 | Orduspor | 59 | (9) |
| 1981–1984 | Sakaryaspor | 91 | (20) |
| 1984–1992 | Fenerbahçe | 207 | (51) |
| 1991 | → Antalyaspor (loan) | 6 | (1) |
| Total | | 363 | (81) |

International career
| 1978–1979 | Turkey U18 | 3 | (1) |
| 1980–1984 | Turkey U21 | 10 | (4) |
| 1981–1986 | Turkey | 28 | (5) |

Managerial career
- 1996–1997: Çanakkale Dardanelspor (assistant)
- 1997: Edirnespor
- 1997: Aydınspor
- 1998: Malatyaspor
- 1999: Fenerbahçe (assistant)
- 2000: Mobellaspor
- 2001: Sapancaspor
- 2014–2019: Fenerbahçe U21
- 2021: Fenerbahçe (assistant)
- * Club domestic league appearances and goals

Şenol Çorlu (born 3 December 1958 in Ankara) is a retired Turkish football player and currently Fenerbahçe SK academy director as of September 2008. He was one of the fans' favourites when he was playing for Fenerbahçe.

He began football in Petrol Ofisi in 1975–76 season and played there for 4 years. He was transferred to Orduspor due to Petrol Ofisi's relegation to the amateur league in 1979. He improved in Orduspor and was transferred to Sakaryaspor in 1981. He played as striker there, and was transferred to Fenerbahçe in 1984. His position was striker at first, midfielder after 1990. He won 2 league championships with Fenerbahçe – seasons 1984–85 and 1988–89. He was loaned to Antalyaspor during the 1991–92 season. He retired from football after the end of that season.

He played 17 times for Turkey national football team, making his debut on 23 September 1981 against the Soviet Union. He also played 13 times for Turkey U21. He scored 4 international goals.
