= 1982–83 1.Lig =

25th season of top-tier Turkish football

1.Lig
- Season: 1982–83
- Champions: Fenerbahçe (10th title)
- Relegated: Mersin İdman Yurdu; Samsunspor; Gaziantepspor; Altay
- European Cup: Fenerbahçe
- Cup Winners' Cup: Mersin İdman Yurdu
- UEFA Cup: Trabzonspor
- Matches: 306
- Goals: 636 (2.08 per match)
- Top goalscorer: Selçuk Yula (19 goals)

The following are the statistics of the Turkish First Football League in season 1982/1983.

== Overview ==
It was contested by 18 teams, and Fenerbahçe S.K. won the championship.

== League table ==
Pos	Team	Pld	W	D	L	GF	GA	GD	Pts	Qualification or relegation
1	Fenerbahçe (C)	34	18	13	3	43	20	+23	49	Qualification to European Cup first round
2	Trabzonspor	34	17	13	4	40	19	+21	47	Qualification to UEFA Cup first round
3	Galatasaray	34	17	10	7	50	33	+17	44	Invitation to Balkans Cup
4	Boluspor	34	16	9	9	39	23	+16	41	
5	Beşiktaş	34	16	7	11	49	30	+19	39	
6	MKE Ankaragücü	34	8	18	8	38	37	+1	34	
7	Adana Demirspor	34	13	7	14	39	36	+3	33	
8	Bursaspor	34	11	11	12	36	34	+2	33	
9	Kocaelispor	34	10	13	11	34	37	−3	33	
10	Adanaspor	34	11	10	13	32	35	−3	32	
11	Sakaryaspor	34	13	6	15	37	43	−6	32	
12	Sarıyer	34	8	15	11	35	43	−8	31	
13	Zonguldakspor	34	9	12	13	31	35	−4	30	
14	Antalyaspor	34	9	11	14	27	40	−13	29	
15	Mersin İdman Yurdu (R)	34	10	9	15	19	32	−13	29	Cup Winners' Cup and relegation to Turkish Second Football League
16	Samsunspor (R)	34	10	8	16	37	49	−12	28	Relegation to Second Football League
17	Gaziantepspor (R)	34	9	9	16	23	35	−12	27	Relegation to Second Football League
18	Altay (R)	34	7	7	20	27	55	−28	21	Relegation to Second Football League

Rules for classification: 1) points; 2) goal difference; 3) number of goals scored.
(C) Champions; (R) Relegated

== Results ==
Home \ Away	ADS	ADA	ALT	ANT	BJK	BOL	BUR	FNB	GAL	GAZ	KOC	MİY	AGÜ	SAK	SAM	SAR	TRA	ZON
Adana Demirspor		1–1	4–3	1–0	2–4	1–0	2–2	0–1	3–0	1–0	2–0	1–0	2–0	2–0	1–0	2–3	0–1	0–0
Adanaspor	0–1		0–0	2–1	1–0	0–0	1–1	0–0	2–1	3–0	1–0	2–0	4–2	1–0	1–0	3–0	1–3	0–0
Altay	0–4	1–0		0–1	0–1	1–2	0–0	1–0	1–1	1–0	1–0	1–2	3–3	0–1	1–0	2–1	0–1	2–1
Antalyaspor	1–1	0–0	5–2		2–0	0–0	0–1	1–1	0–1	1–0	2–2	1–1	1–0	1–0	2–0	1–1	2–1	0–0
Beşiktaş	2–1	2–0	4–1	6–0		1–1	3–1	0–1	0–1	4–1	1–0	3–0	1–1	1–0	1–0	4–1	0–2	3–0
Boluspor	1–0	5–1	1–0	4–0	2–1		0–1	0–0	0–1	1–0	1–1	1–0	1–0	3–0	2–1	1–2	0–0	3–0
Bursaspor	3–0	3–1	2–0	2–1	1–0	0–1		1–2	1–1	2–1	1–2	1–0	0–0	3–1	3–1	1–2	0–1	0–0
Fenerbahçe	2–0	0–1	2–0	1–1	1–1	1–1	1–1		1–0	1–0	2–0	3–0	0–1	3–0	1–0	2–1	4–2	2–1
Galatasaray	1–0	1–0	6–2	2–0	1–1	2–0	2–1	4–4		1–0	2–0	1–0	2–2	5–1	4–1	1–1	0–0	2–1
Gaziantepspor	1–0	1–0	0–0	1–0	1–0	0–0	1–1	0–1	2–1		0–0	2–0	0–0	3–2	3–0	0–0	1–0	1–1
Kocaelispor	1–0	1–1	1–0	2–1	0–1	0–1	1–0	1–1	1–1	2–2		2–0	4–1	2–2	1–1	2–1	1–1	2–0
Mersin İdman Yurdu	1–0	1–0	0–0	1–0	1–0	1–0	1–0	0–0	2–0	0–0	0–0		0–0	1–1	1–0	2–0	0–0	0–0
MKE Ankaragücü	2–2	1–1	4–0	0–0	1–1	1–0	3–1	0–1	0–0	3–1	2–0	3–2		2–2	1–1	0–0	0–0	0–1
Sakaryaspor	3–2	3–1	1–0	0–1	3–0	3–1	2–0	1–1	1–0	1–0	0–1	2–1	0–0		2–0	2–0	0–1	1–0
Samsunspor	1–0	2–1	2–1	2–0	2–2	2–1	1–1	1–2	1–1	3–1	3–0	2–0	2–2	2–0		2–0	0–0	1–1
Sarıyer	1–1	2–2	0–0	1–0	0–0	1–2	1–1	0–0	1–2	1–0	2–1	1–1	1–1	3–0	3–2		0–1	2–2
Trabzonspor	1–1	1–0	3–2	1–1	1–0	1–1	0–0	0–1	2–0	3–2	2–2	1–0	2–0	1–0	5–1	0–0		1–1
Zonguldakspor	0–1	1–0	2–1	3–0	0–1	0–2	1–0	0–0	1–2	1–0	1–1	2–1	1–2	3–1	4–0	2–2	0–1	

Source: TFF, Mackolik
Legend: Blue = home team win; Yellow = draw; Red = away team win.
