= Gökçeler relief =

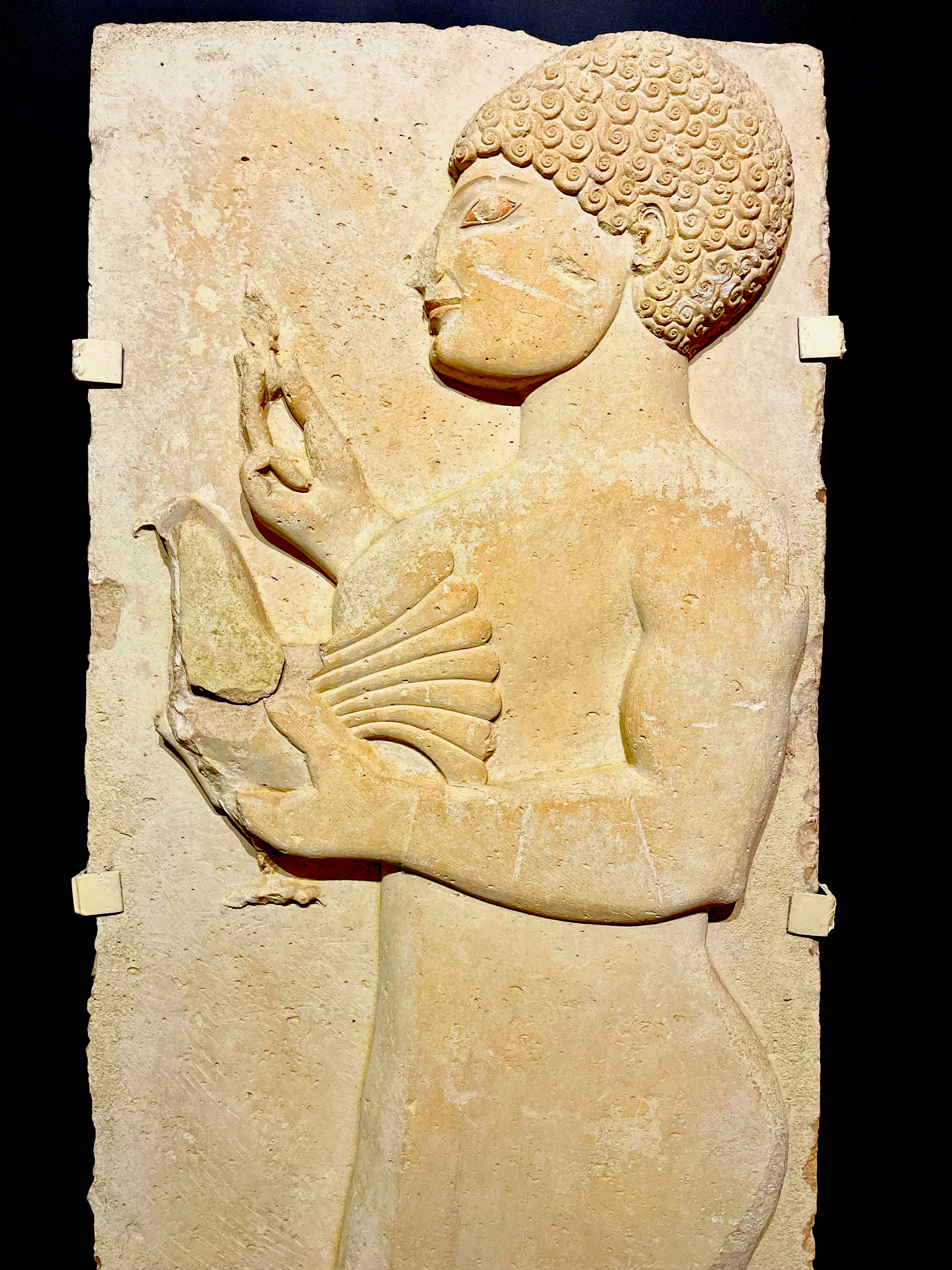
- The Gökçeler relief, in Akhisar Museum, Turkey
- Created: 5th century BCE
- Discovered: Gökçeler,Akhisar Manisa, Turkey; 38.573704°N 27.286191°E
- Present location: Akhisar Museum, Turkey

Location

The Gökçeler relief is an Achaemenid-era tomb relief made in the Anatolian-Persian style. It was found in 2004 in the village of Gökçeler in Manisa Province of present-day Turkey. The area of discovery corresponds to the northern part of the historic region of Lydia, at a time when it was a satrapy (province) of the Achaemenid Persian Empire. The relief is made out of limestone and measures 1.79m × 0.55m × 0.25m. The relief is a "distinctive product of the artistic synthesis classified as Graeco-Persian or Anatolian-Persian". It was created between the late 6th century and early 5th century BC. It may be used as "yet further evidence for the presence of Persians in the region".

According to Figen Çevirici-Coşkun in Anatolian Studies, the relief probably depicts an African male figure presenting gifts to the tomb owner, the latter perhaps being a Persian noble or a non-Persian noble serving the Persians, who had adopted Persian cultural habits. The African figure was either a servant or friend of the tomb owner. Çevirici-Coşkun notes that this does not come as a surprise, as the Achaemenid Empire was multi-ethnic and the Persians lived together with other nations. Furthermore, archaeological data from Sardis (the capital of the Lydian satrapy) and Dascylium (the capital of the Hellespontine Phrygia satrapy) has shown the existence of cosmopolitan populations in these important satrapy centres. According to Elspeth R. M. Dusinberre, the figure remains ambiguous, and could also be a woman, although women are not generally depicted in Persian relief sculptures.

In terms of iconography, the gifts presented by the figure are "western Anatolian and Greek in origin", however, the clothing he wears are "clearly of Persian influence". The work is unique as it is, to date, the only known Anatolian-Persian sculptural work discovered in Anatolia depicting an African figure. The work testifies to the "multiracial social structure of the Lydia region during the late sixth to early fifth century BC". The stele is located in the Akhisar Museum.

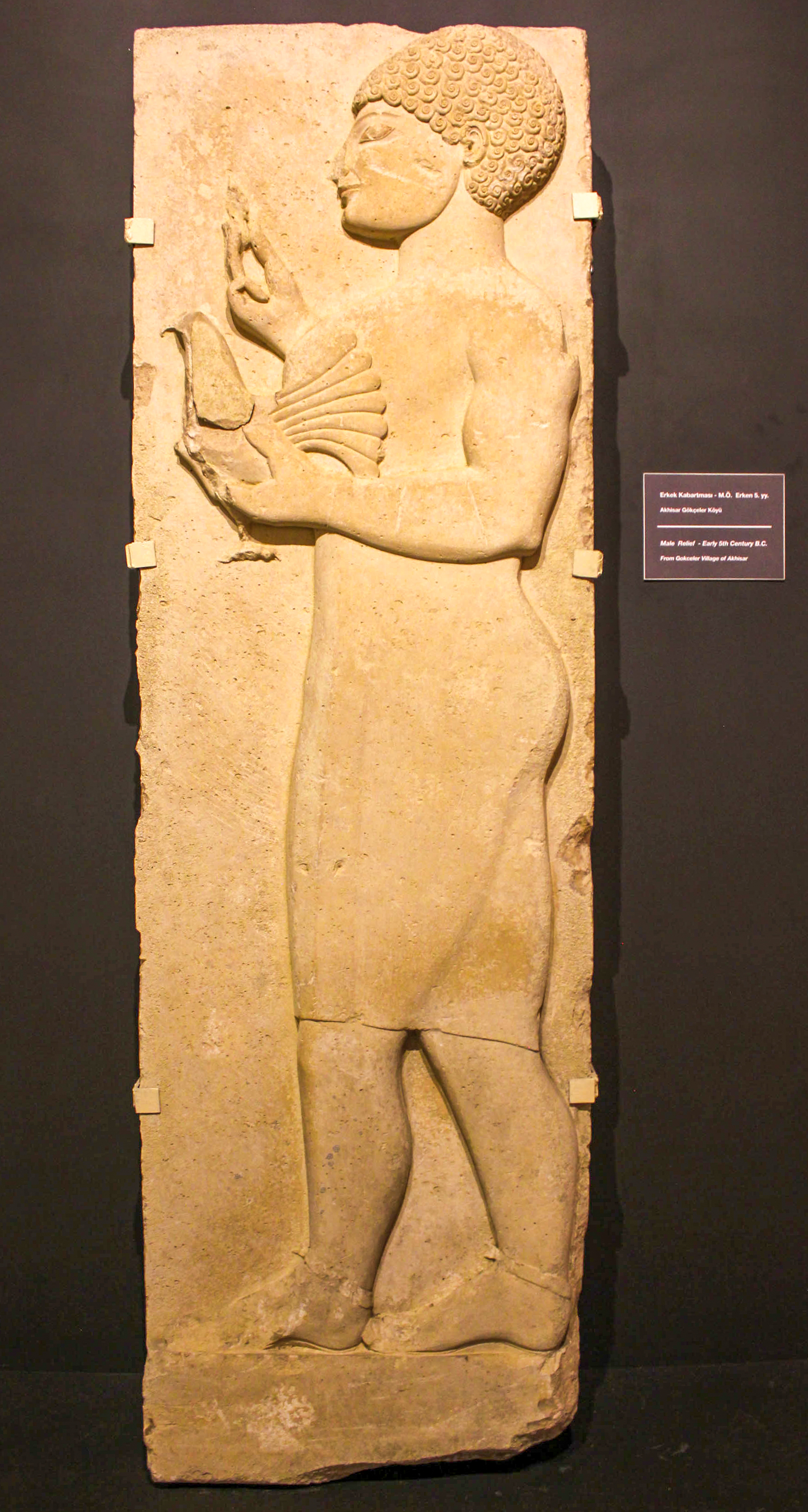

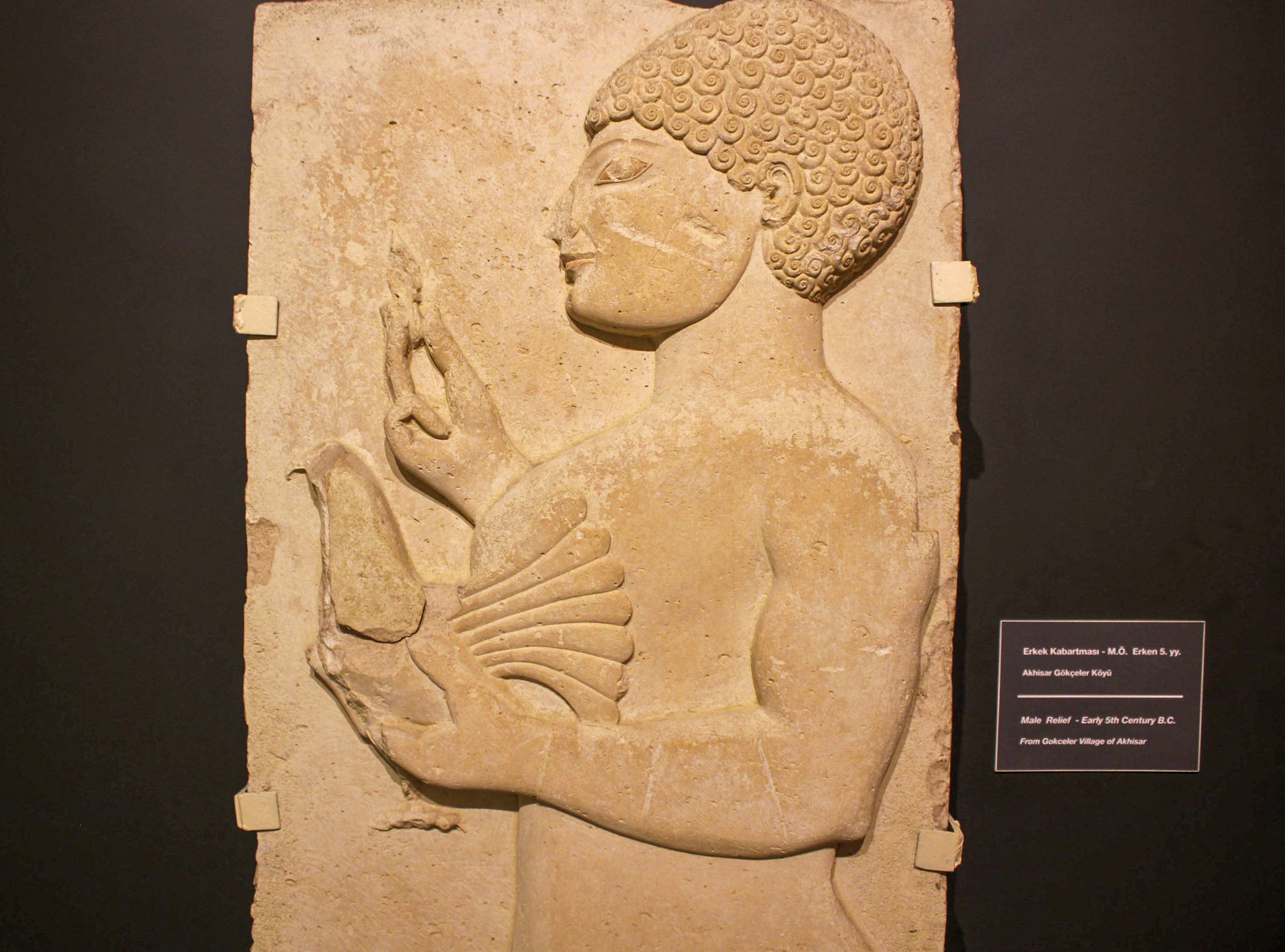

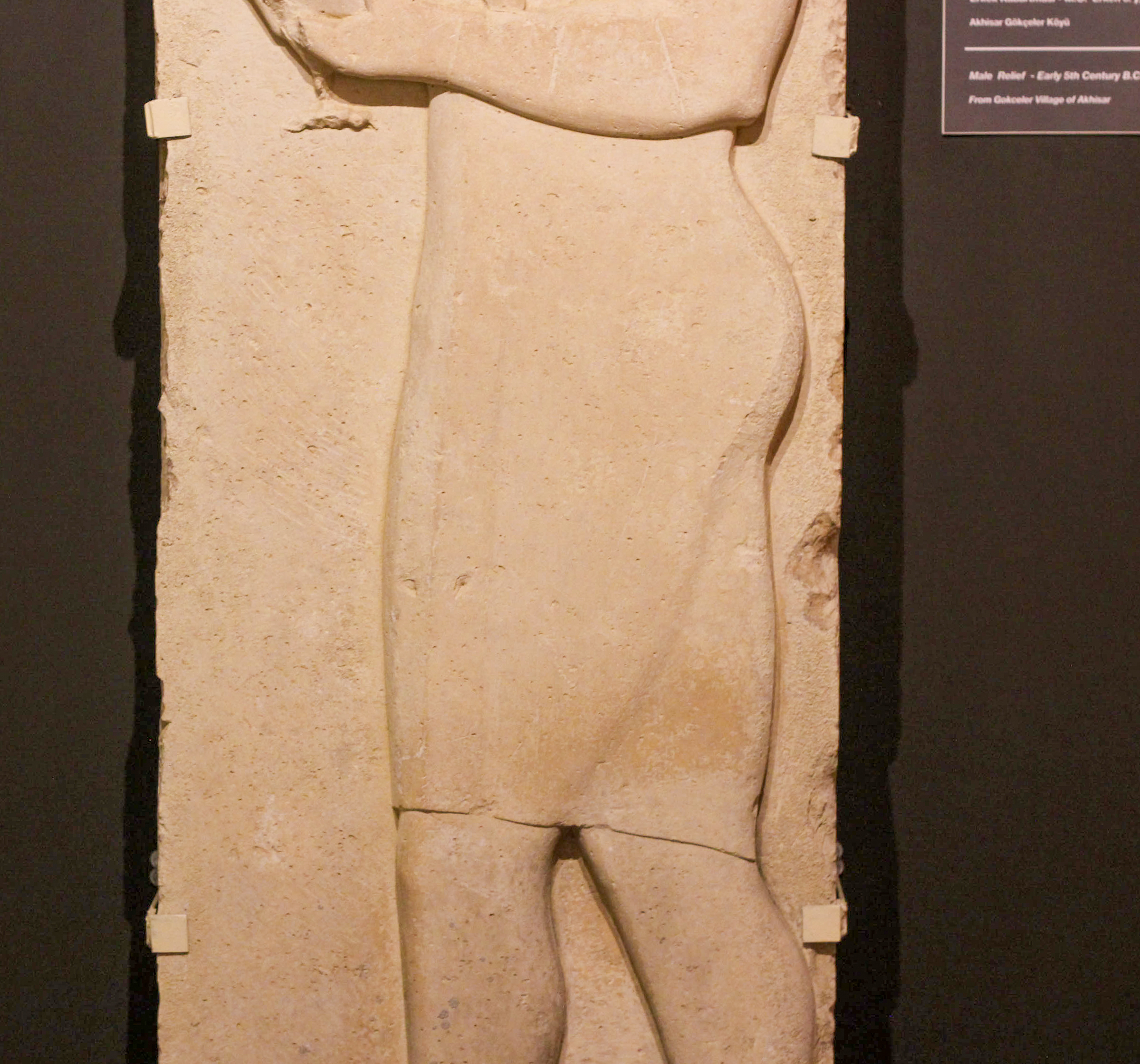

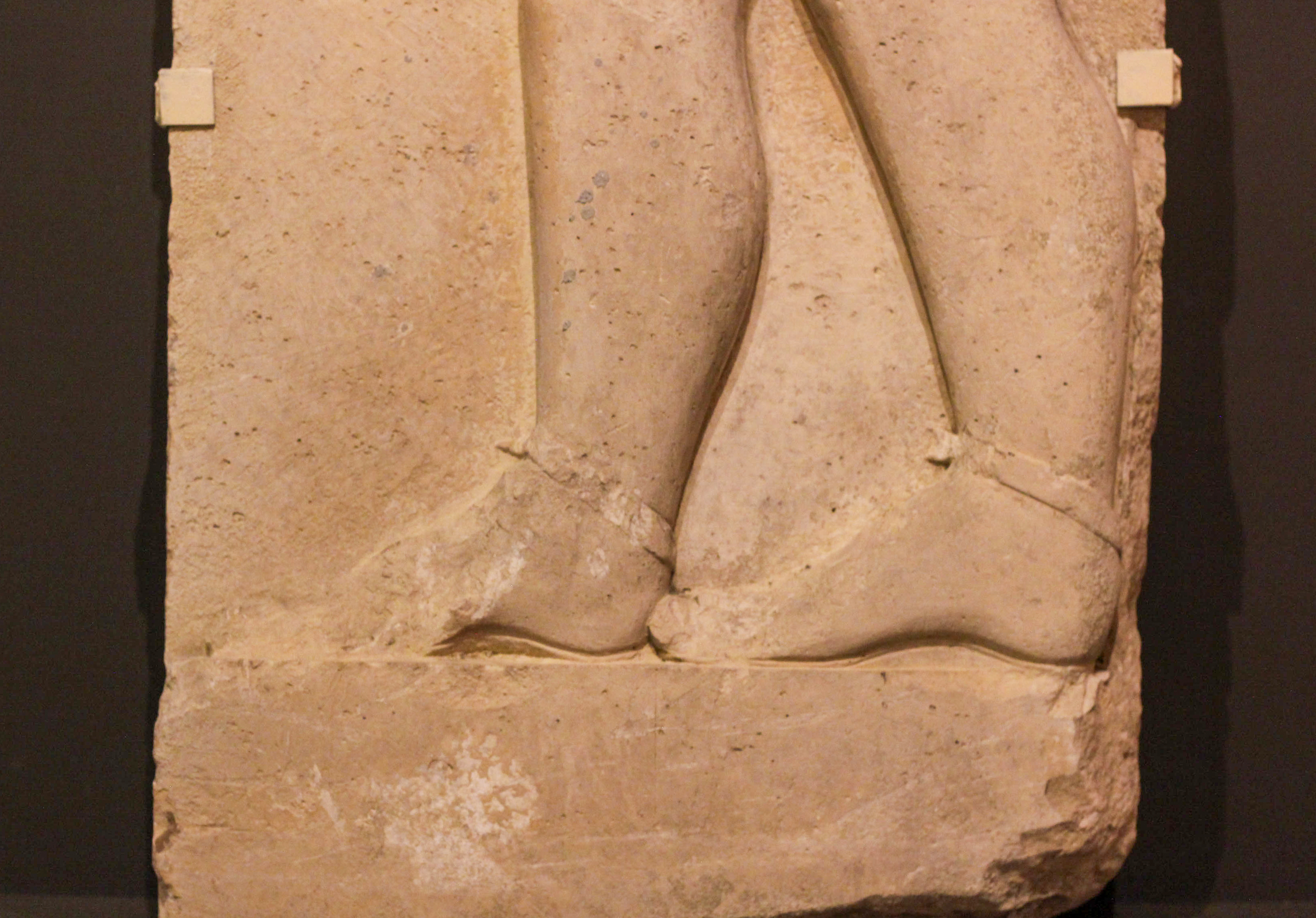

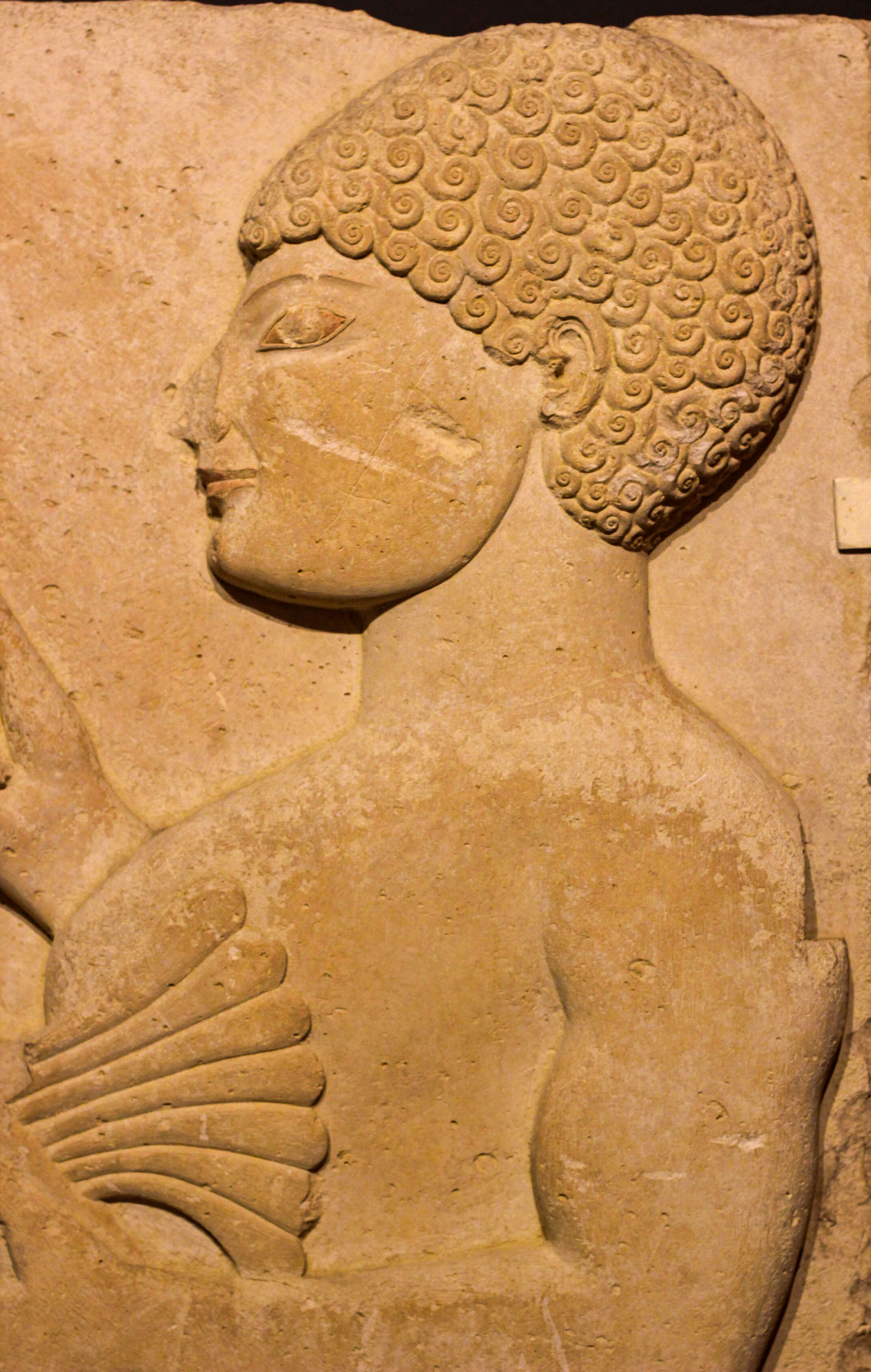

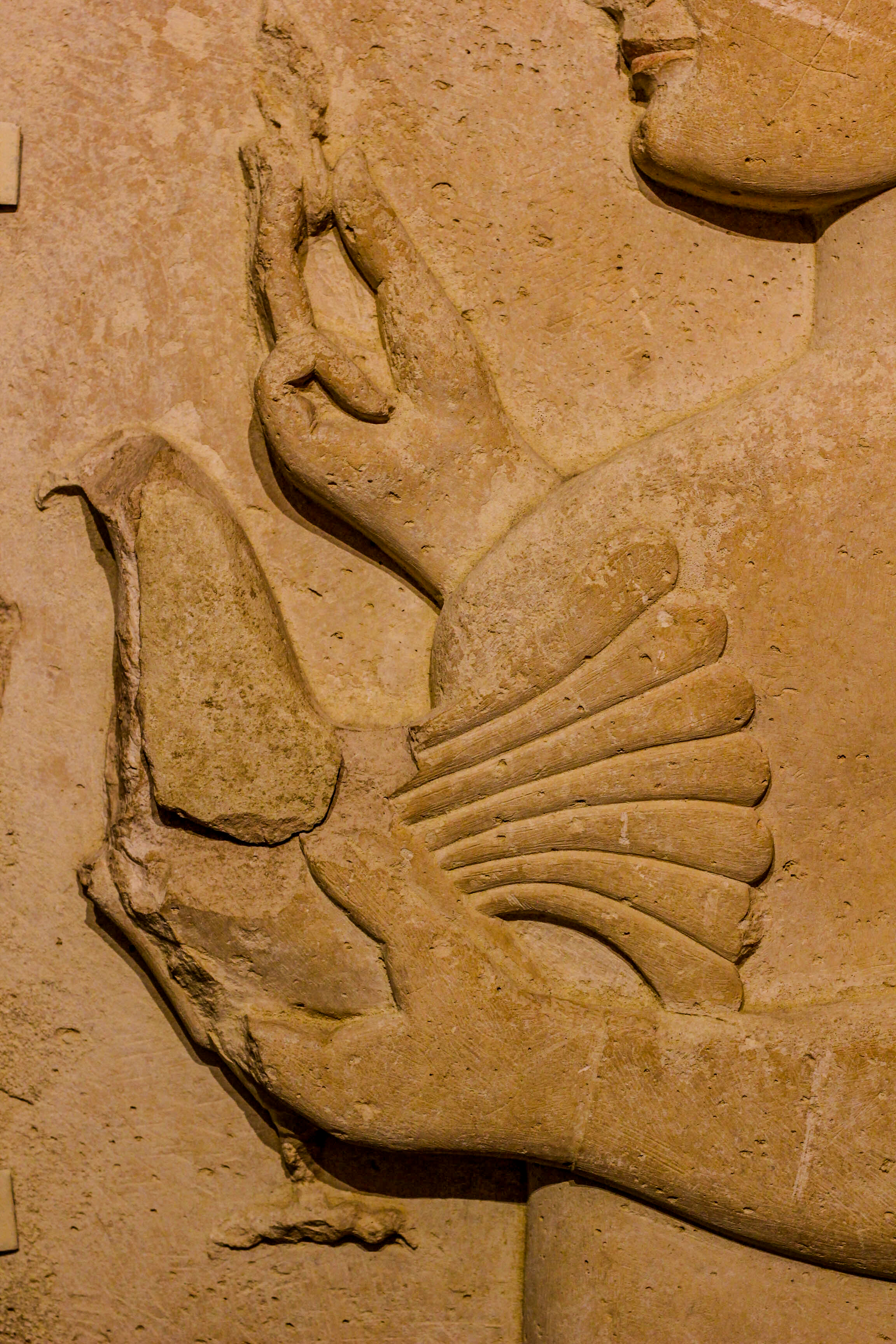

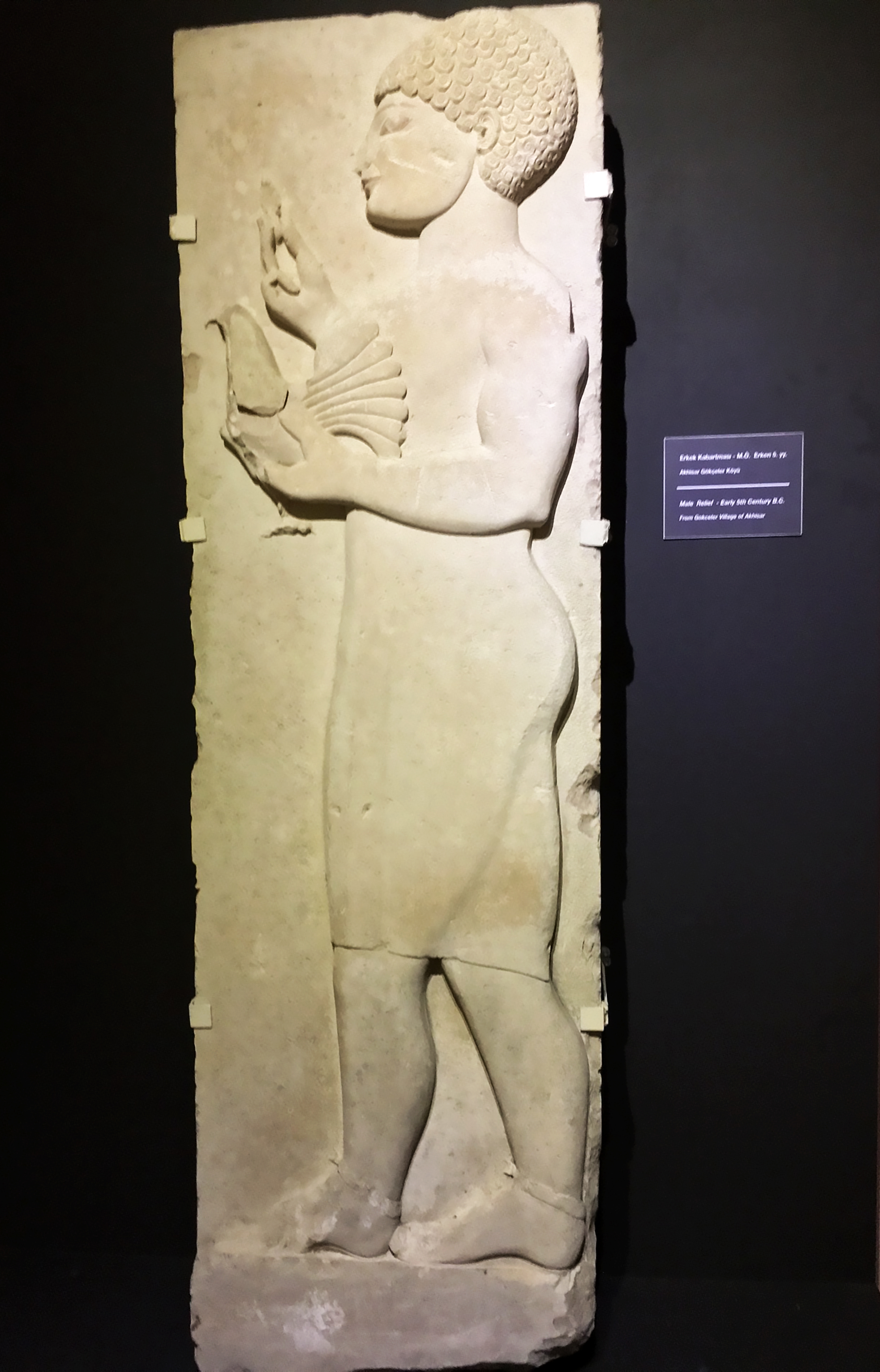

== Sources ==
- Çevirici-Coşkun, Figen (2018). "An Anatolian-Persian tomb relief from Gökçeler in Lydia". Anatolian Studies. 68: 119–130. doi:10.1017/S0066154618000054. S2CID 165412337.
