= Yortan culture =

- Religion: Western Anatolia
- Period: Chalcolithic - Bronze Age transition
- Major sites: Mysia - Thyateira
- Defined by: Paul Gaudin, Victor Chapot

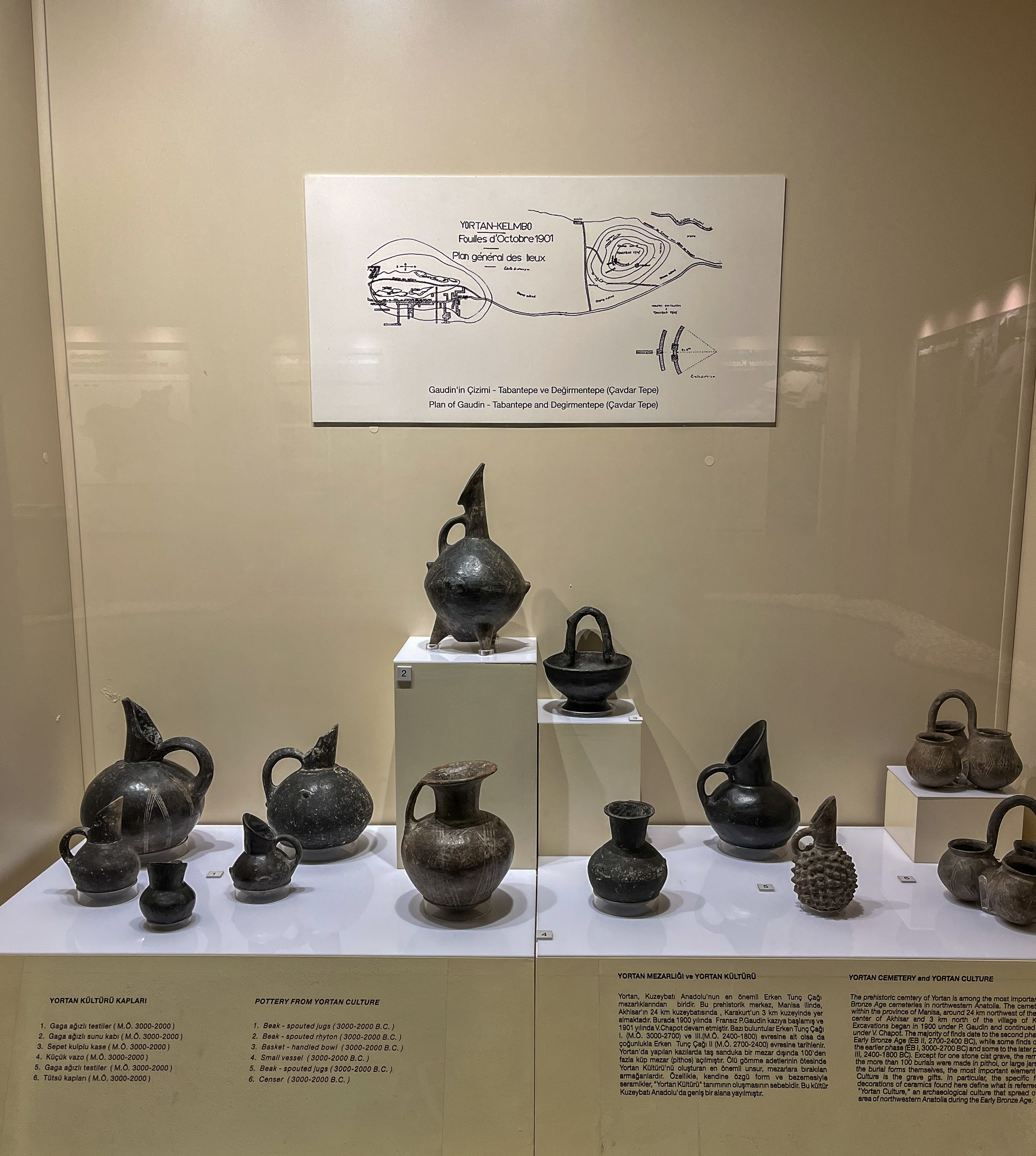
Pottery from the Yortan culture on display at the Akhisar Museum.

The Yortan culture is an archaeological culture that existed during the transitional period between the Chalcolithic Age and the early Bronze Age (approximately 2700–2300 BCE). It was located in the Western Anatolia region of Turkey, particularly between the provinces of Balıkesir and Manisa. The culture is named after the Yortan Cemetery, located near the village of Yortan (now Bostancı) in the Kırkağaç district of Manisa, where excavations were conducted in the early 1900s by Paul Gaudin and Victor Chapot. Known for its distinctive ceramic types and pithos burial traditions, the Yortan Culture has been recognized in the fields of archaeology, excavation, and museology since the early 20th century.
