= Akhisar Museum =

Museum in Akhisar, Manisa, Türkiye

- Akhisar Müzesi
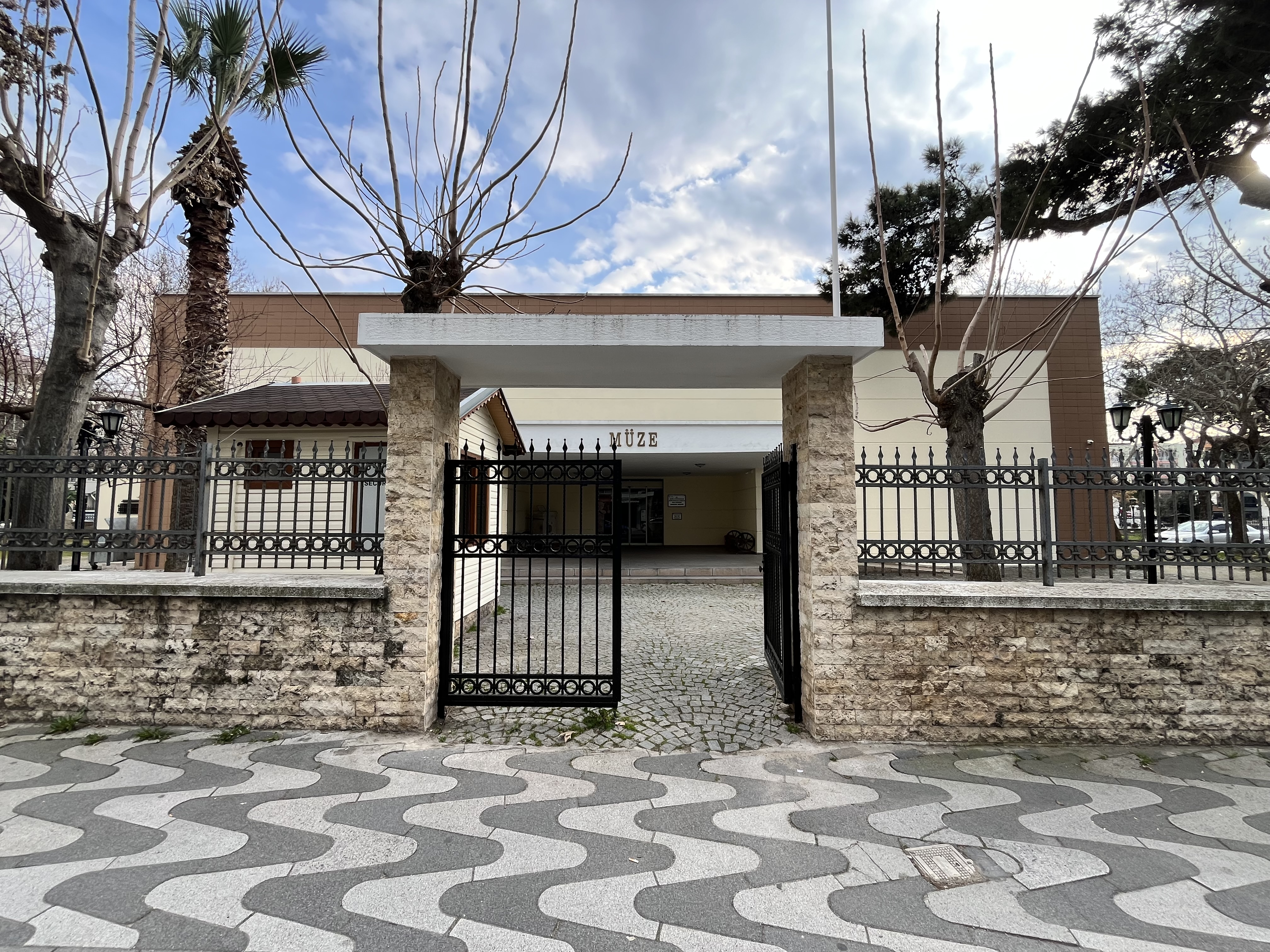
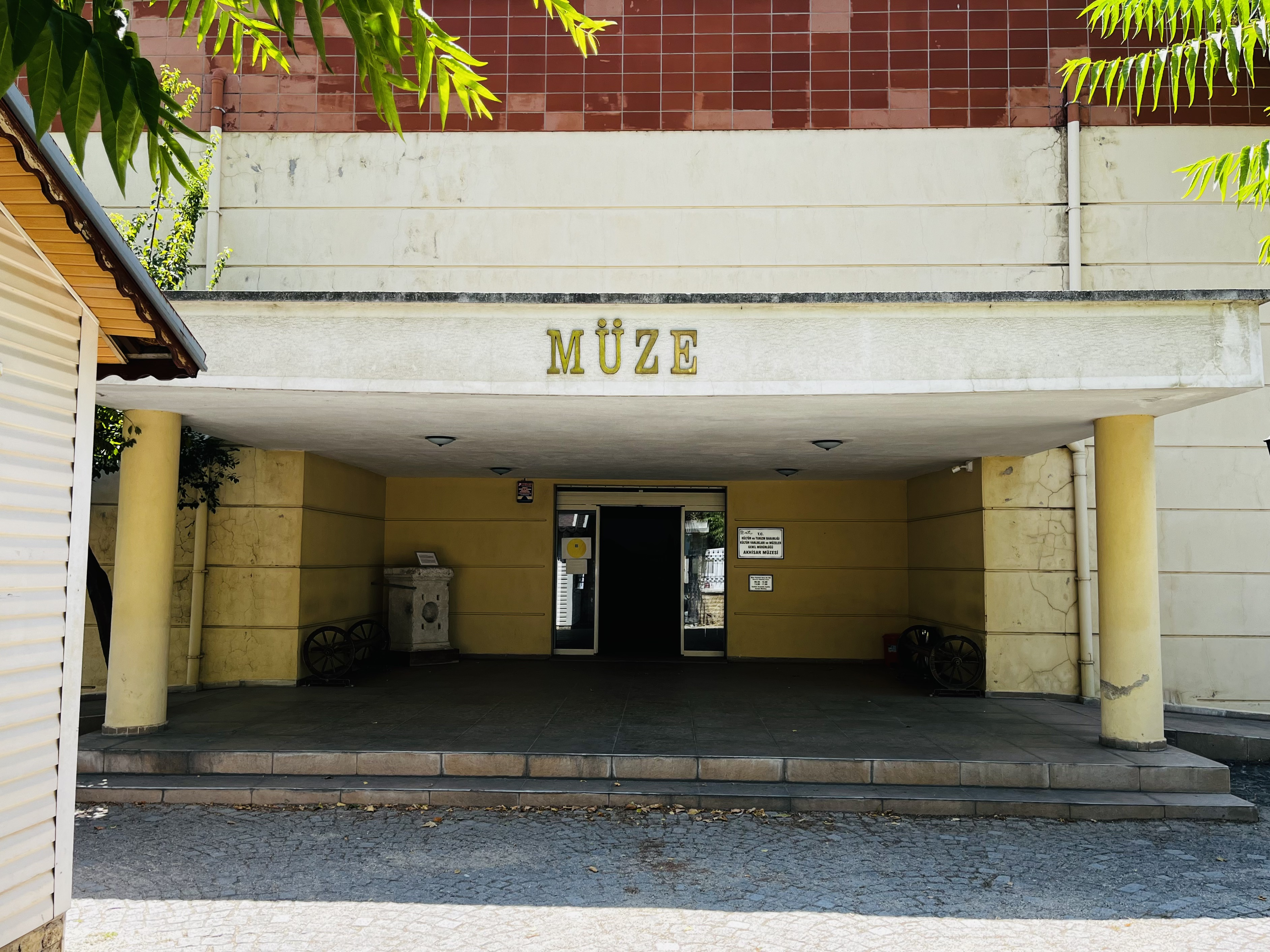
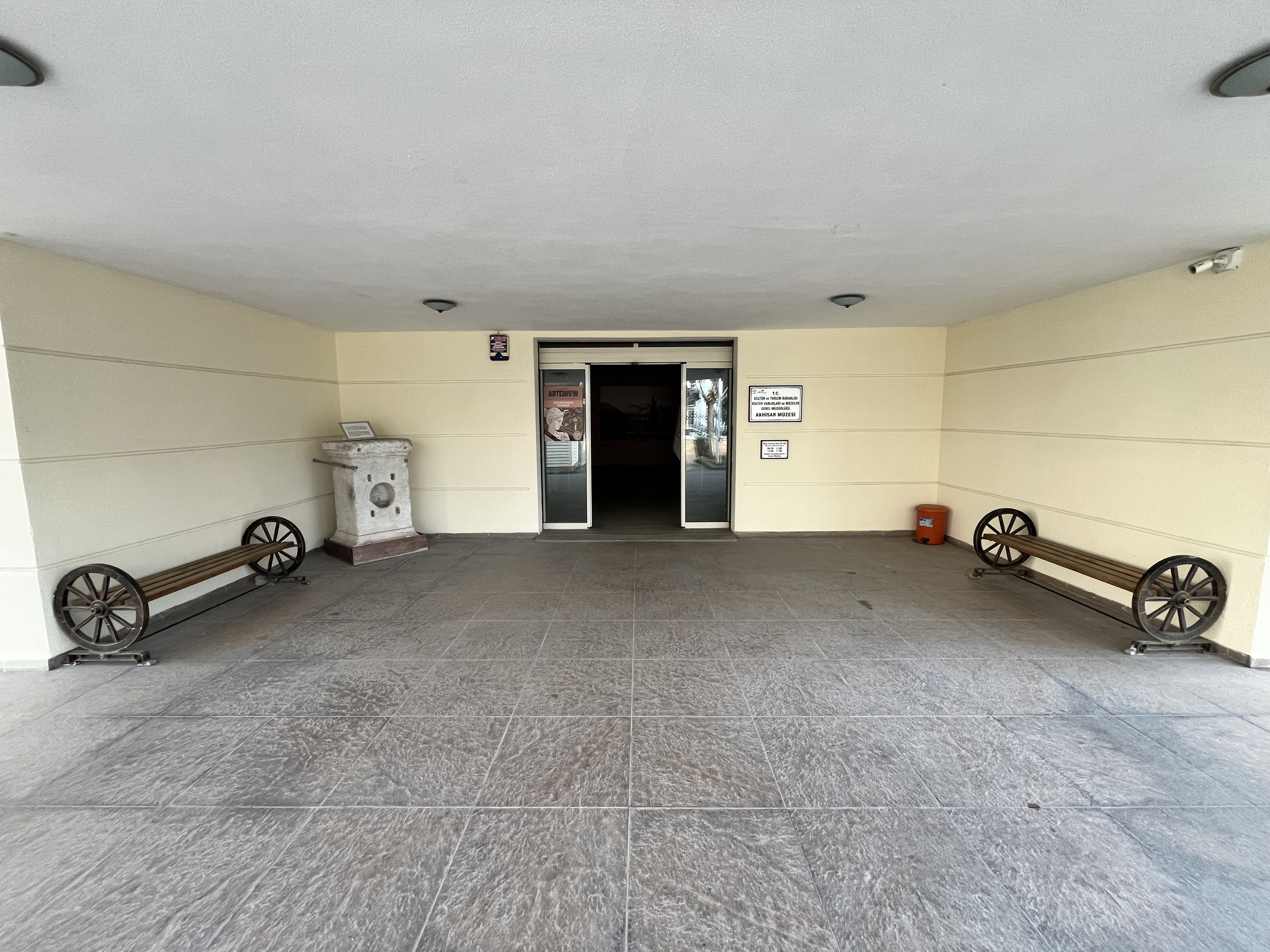
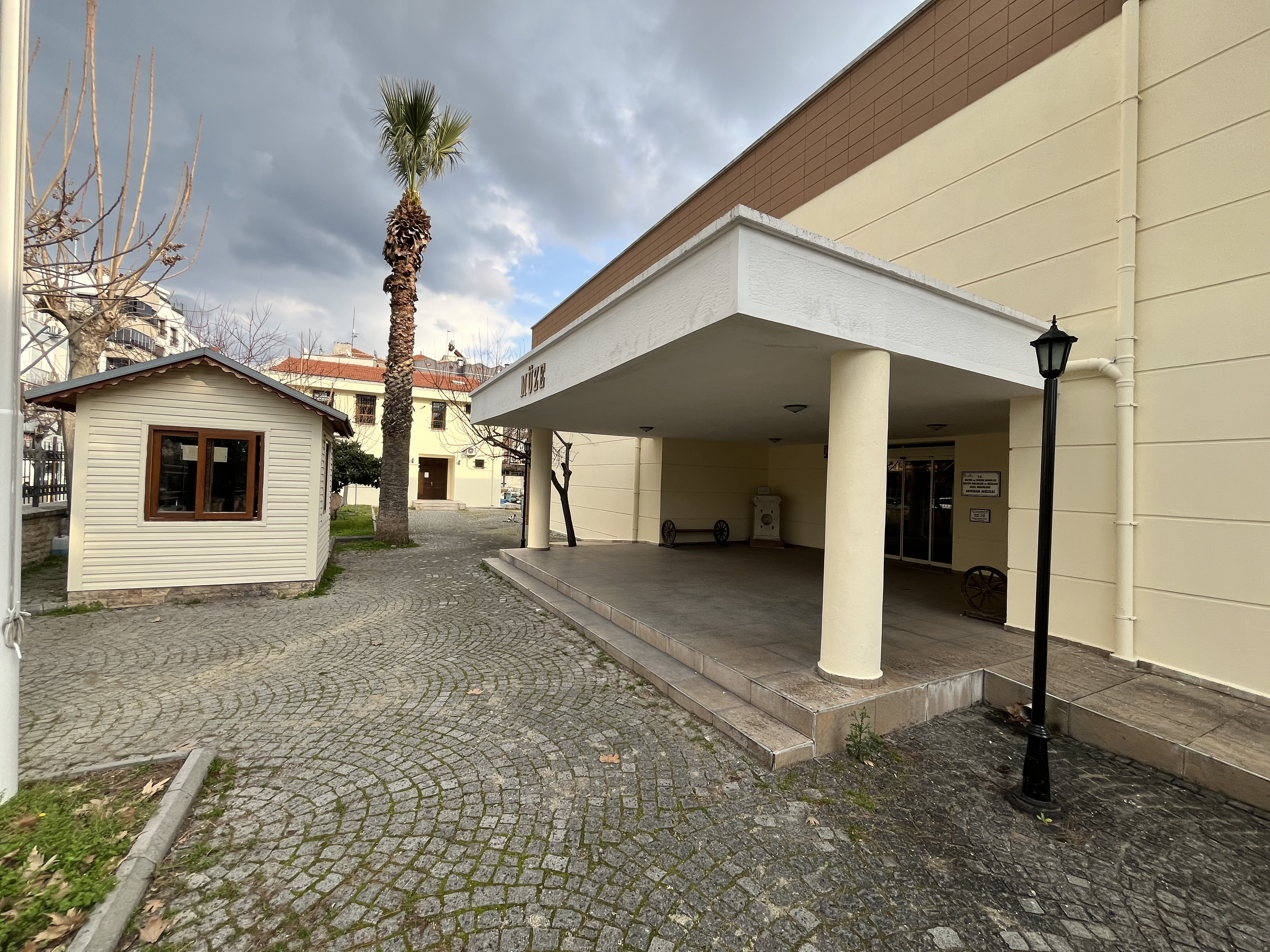
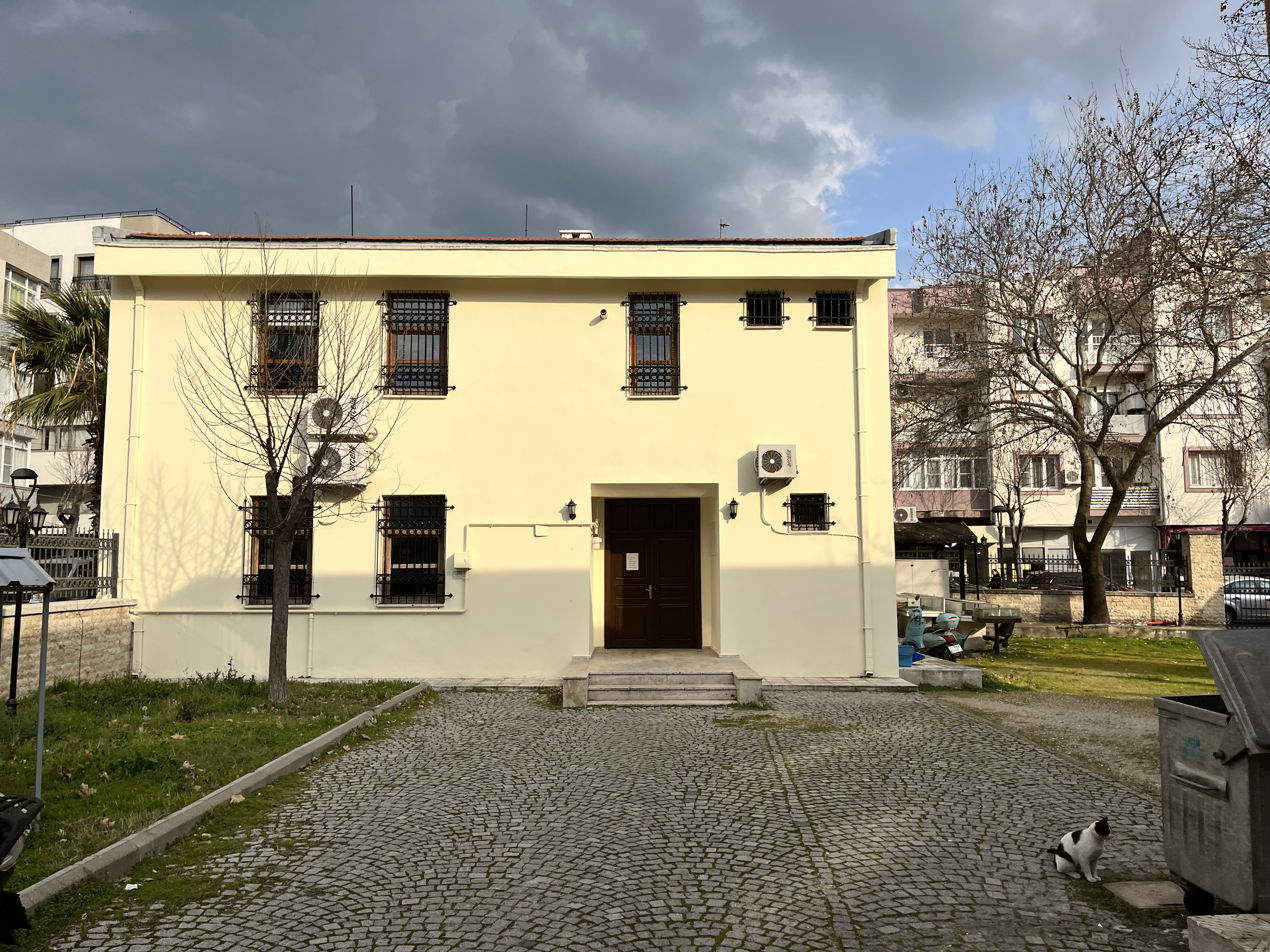
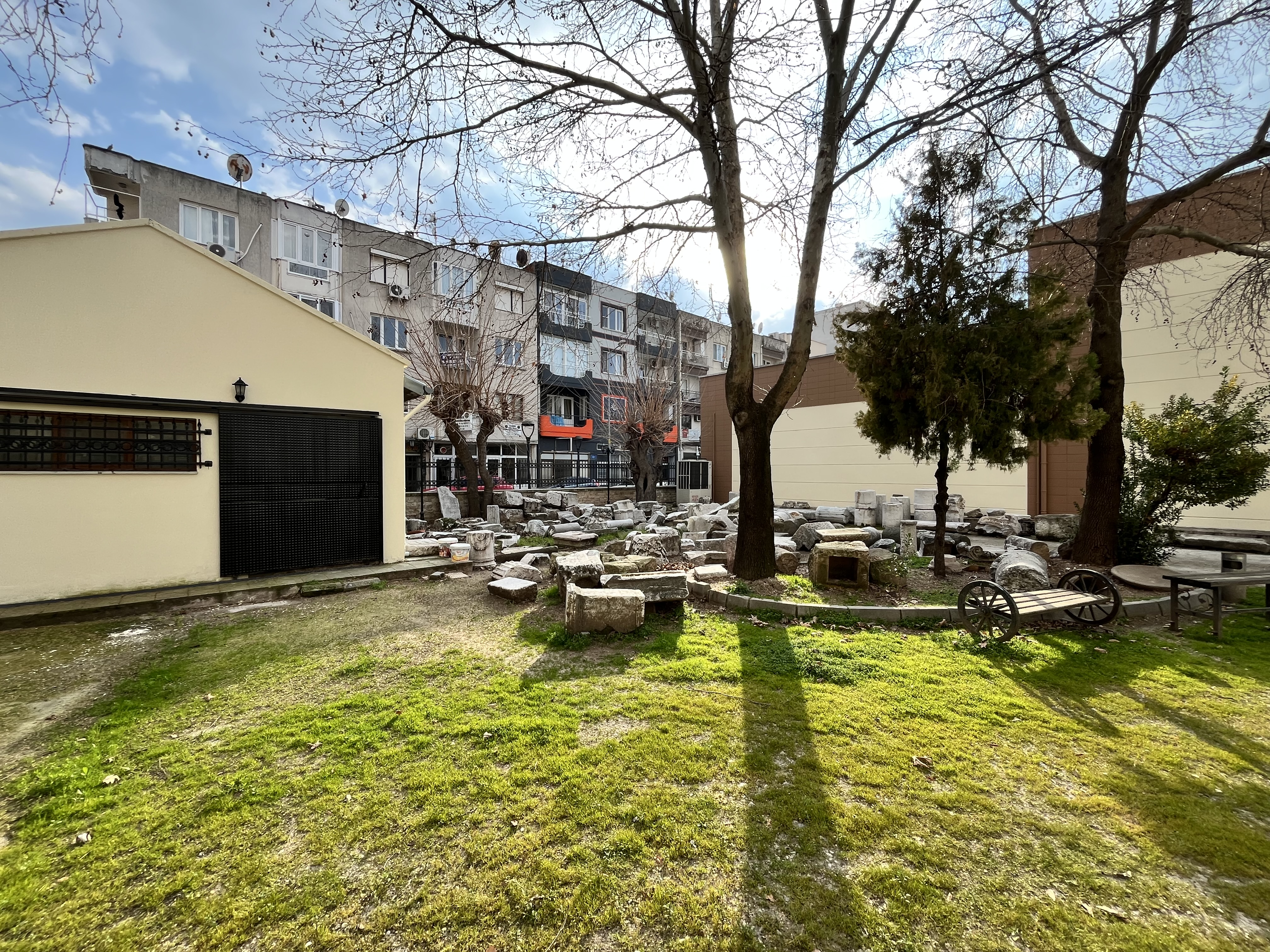

- Akhisar Museum
- Established: 2012; 14 years ago
- Coordinates: 38°55′13″N 27°50′14″E
- Type: Archaeology -Ethnography
- Collection size: 689 object^{(2019)}
- Visitors: 18.084^{(2019)}
- Owner: Ministry of Culture

Akhisar Museum, is an archaeology and ethnography museum located in Akhisar. Situated next to the Thyatira archaeological site and operating under the Manisa Museum Directorate, the museum was opened to visitors in 2012.

The museum is housed in a building originally constructed in 1932 as a hospital. Over the years, the building served as a school and a teacher's house before undergoing restoration to be converted into a museum. With a 650 m² indoor exhibition space, the museum’s collection comprises a total of 689 artifacts. The exhibits include items discovered in and around Akhisar, featuring archaeological artifacts from the Hellenistic period, Ancient Rome, and Byzantine periods, as well as ethnographic objects reflecting the Ottoman and Republican eras.

The museum is divided into two main sections: archaeology and ethnography. In the Archaeology Section, notable displays include Thyatira coins, gold objects from the Lydia period, ceramics from the Yortan culture, and the Gökçeler relief. The Ethnography Section showcases traditional life in Akhisar through exhibits such as hand-embroidered items, clothing, objects related to carpet weaving, and seals. Additionally, the Arasta Section within the ethnography area highlights traditional local occupations such as tobacco production, felt-making, carriage-making, and saddlery, along with objects associated with these crafts.

== Museum building ==
The building of the Akhisar Museum, affiliated with the Manisa Museum Directorate, has served various functions in the past and provided diverse services to the city. The structure was originally constructed in 1932 by Ayşe Aloğlu as a two-story hospital to commemorate her son, Ali Şefik, who died young from illness. Named "Ali Şefik Hospital," the building was repurposed as a school and allocated to the Ministry of National Education at the request of local authorities, with Ayşe Aloğlu’s approval. It functioned as Ali Şefik Middle School until 1992, after which it was renovated and reopened in 1994 as Ali Şefik Teachers' Residence.

In 2005, the closure of the teacher's house and its reassignment for another purpose came under consideration, sparking debates in the city. In particular, the Akhisar Branch of Eğitim Sen criticized the decision, alleging political motives behind the closure, and organized protests with participation from Akhisar residents. In response to the backlash, authorities announced that the building would be converted into a museum, contributing to the city’s cultural heritage. However, these statements failed to fully resolve the debates surrounding the reasons for the closure. Amid these discussions, the building ceased functioning as a teachers' residence in 2007.

== History ==
=== Background ===
Archaeological artifacts uncovered during excavations in and around Akhisar were stored in depots due to the insufficient capacity of the Archaeological Museum of Manisa. Ongoing excavations in the region, expected to continue in the long term, increased the need for exhibition and storage space for new finds. Furthermore, Akhisar’s location at the intersection of tourism routes such as Istanbul-İzmir and Bergama-Denizli, along with the presence of Thyatira, highlighted the need for a museum in the city. In response to these needs, efforts to establish a museum were initiated under the leadership of Kefayettin Öz, then Chairman of the Manisa Provincial General Assembly Culture and Tourism Commission. On 4 September 2006, a site allocation was made, and it was decided to construct the museum in an area then used as a teachers' residence.

=== Repurposing as a Museum ===
The tender process for the necessary survey, restoration, and repair work to convert the building into a museum began in 2007. In March 2007, feasibility studies for the construction project were conducted. The remaining budget shortfall was covered by the Ministry of Culture and Tourism, with the total budget announced as ₺2.1 million.

Since the museum building is located within a designated heritage site, the planning and permitting processes were lengthy. During this period, survey and restoration plans for the building were prepared. However, once restoration work began, it became evident that the building’s current condition did not align with the project plans. After removing the plaster from the building’s exterior, it was discovered that changes over time had rendered the existing project plans inadequate. Technical experts prepared a report confirming that the building, in its current state, did not meet the project requirements. This necessitated the submission and approval of new plans to the preservation boards.

Changes to the project, the need to renew the tender, and interventions such as the demolition of the building’s second floor caused delays and further prolonged the restoration process. Initially slated for completion by the end of 2007, the structure was completed after a six-year process at a cost of ₺1,537,897. Following the completion of the work, the museum opened to the public on 18 May 2012 and was officially inaugurated on 6 August 2012 with the participation of Culture and Tourism Minister Ertuğrul Günay.

== Museum Layout ==
The museum, constructed as independent units within a garden, comprises a complex that includes the museum building, an administrative building, and a storage facility. Designed with a rectangular plan and a single-story structure, the museum building offers a total enclosed exhibition space of 650 m^{2}. The museum is divided into two main sections: archaeology and ethnography. Within the ethnography section, there is a subsection called Arasta that displays traditional crafts still practiced in Akhisar. Additionally, the museum garden features a 1,250-square-meter open exhibition area, allowing visitors to experience historical artifacts outdoors.

== Collection ==
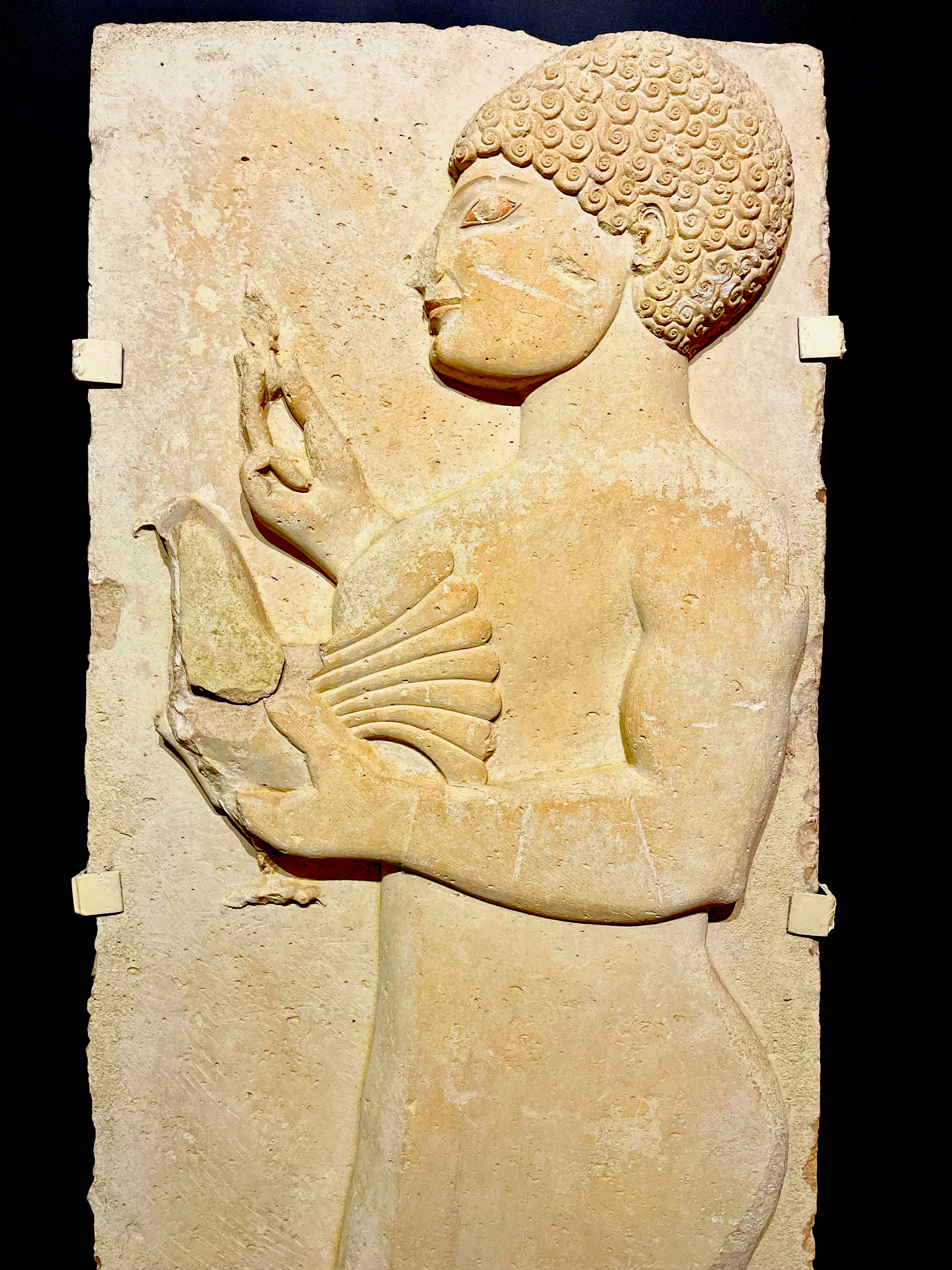
The Gökçeler relief in the museum's collection

The artifacts exhibited in the Akhisar Archaeological Museum were gathered through various methods. Donations, purchases, and confiscations were among the primary approaches. Additionally, artifacts previously preserved at the Archaeological Museum of Manisa were transferred to the Akhisar Museum upon its establishment. Items unearthed from the ancient city of Thyatira and surrounding archaeological excavations form the core of the museum’s collection. In its opening year, the museum displayed 1,051 artifacts, while as of 2019, 689 artifacts are on exhibit. These artifacts are presented to visitors in three distinct sections: archaeology, ethnography, and arasta.

=== Archaeology section ===
The archaeology section of the museum encompasses a timeline stretching from the Bronze Age to the Byzantine Empire, featuring artifacts that reflect the historical and cultural diversity of the region. Fossil samples, dated to approximately 18–11 million years ago, excavated from the coal mines of Soma and added to the museum’s inventory, are also displayed in this section.

Among the early period finds, marble idols and examples of stone craftsmanship from the Kulaksızlar region, dating to the Chalcolithic Age, stand out. Ceramics from the Yortan culture, uncovered during excavations conducted in the early 1900s by Paul Gaudin in the village of Bostancı (formerly known as Yortan) near Akhisar, are also significant pieces in the collection. Gold and silver artifacts from the Lydian period, unearthed from tumulus excavations, as well as five Attica lekythoi dated to the 5th and 4th centuries BCE—two featuring mythological scenes and three adorned with palmette motifs—are exhibited in this section. A gold sheep figurine found in the village of Gökçeler, along with the Gökçeler relief, known as the "Young Man Relief" and dated to the Archaic period, discovered in the same area, are among the standout pieces of the exhibit.

Roman-period ceramics, glass vessels from the Roman and Byzantine periods, unguentaria, metal artifacts, ossuaries, and jewelry displayed in this section reflect the production techniques and aesthetic sensibilities of these eras. Also in this section, four inscriptions from Ancient Rome, used for honorific purposes and as funerary stelae, are displayed. The museum’s inventory also includes terracotta figurines from the Classical Greek and Roman periods, as well as coins from the ancient settlement of Thyatira, spanning the Archaic period to the Ottoman era, all exhibited in this section.

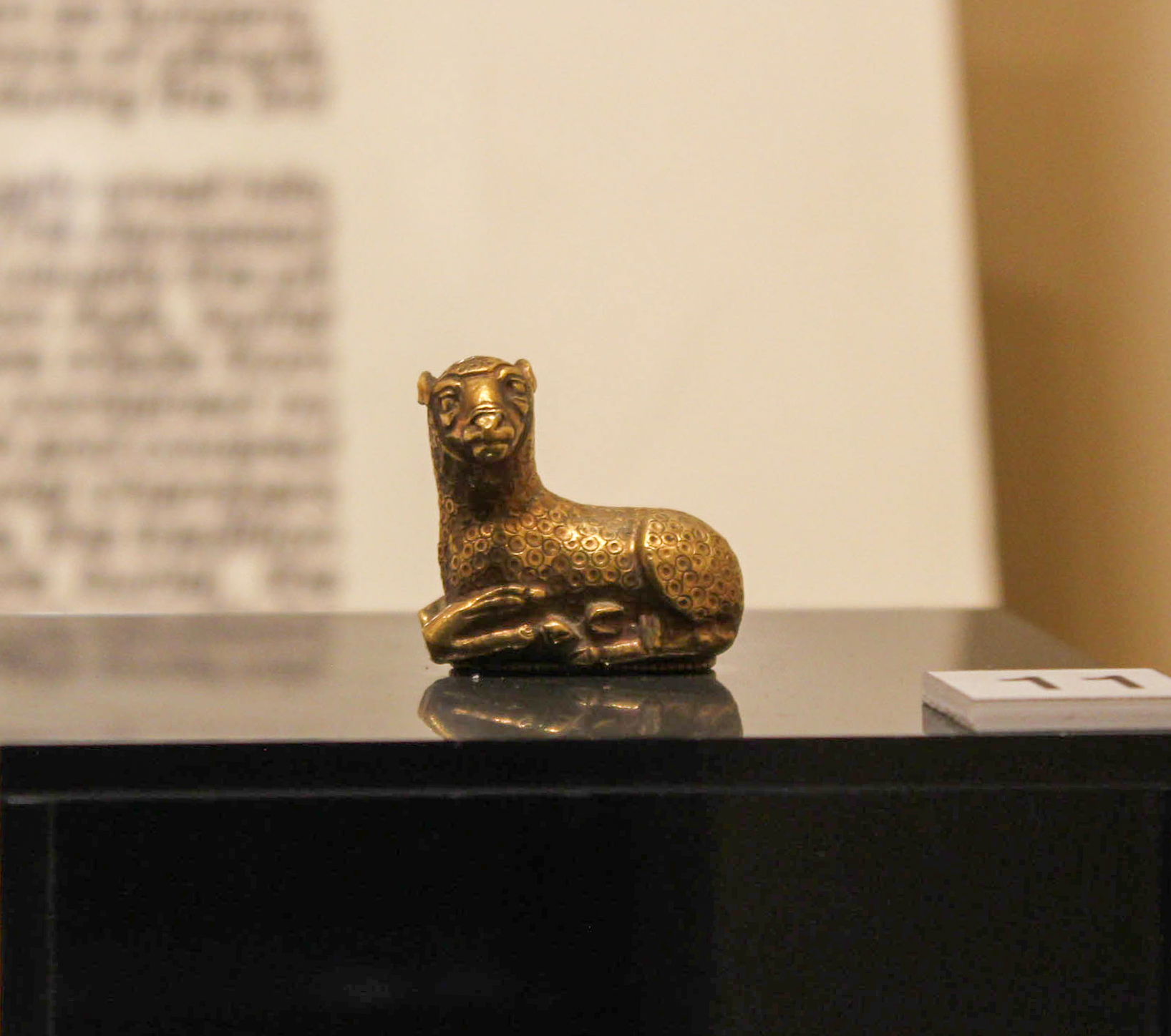
Gold ram-shaped figurine dated to the early 5th century BC

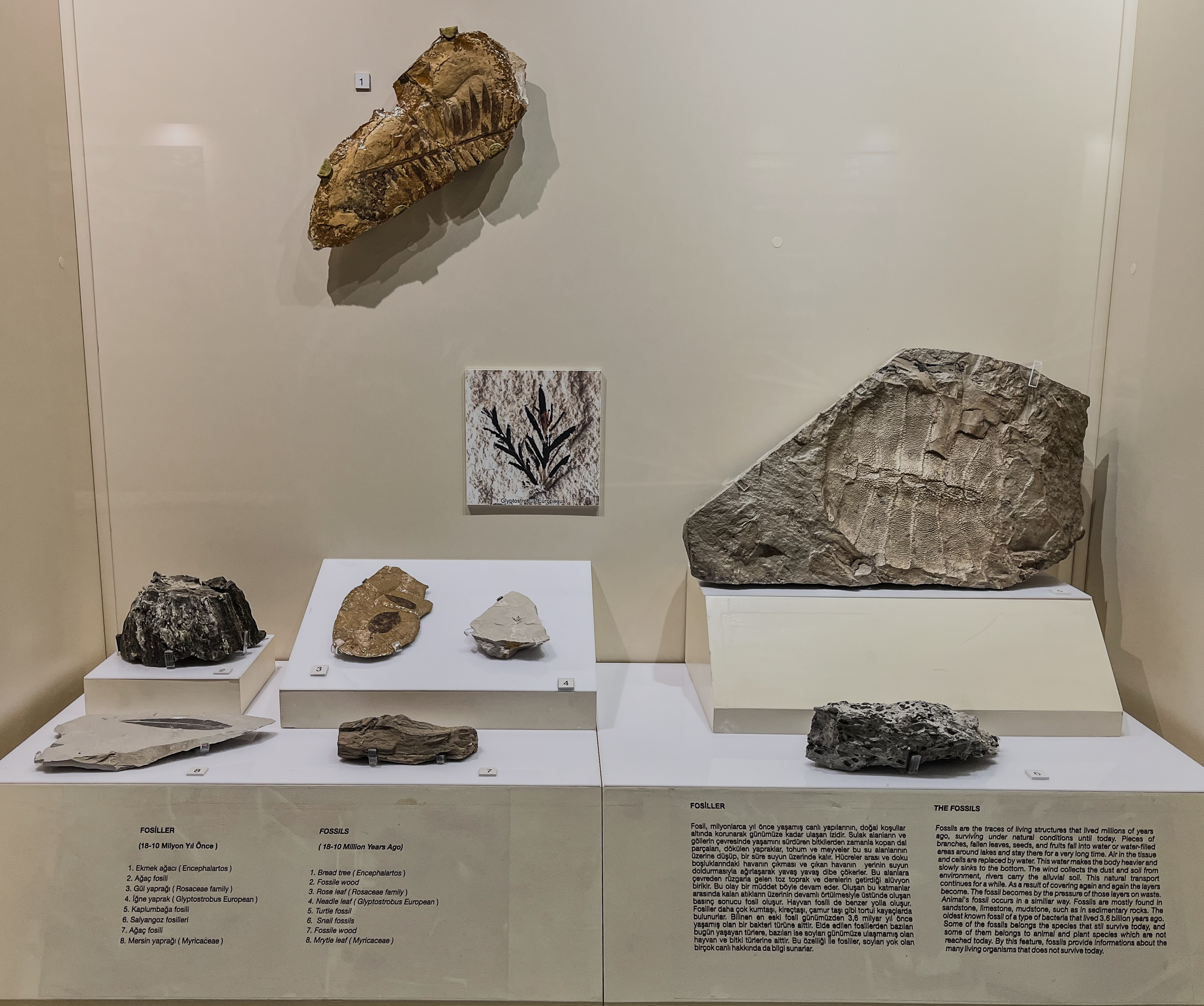
Fossil samples dated to 18–11 million years ago

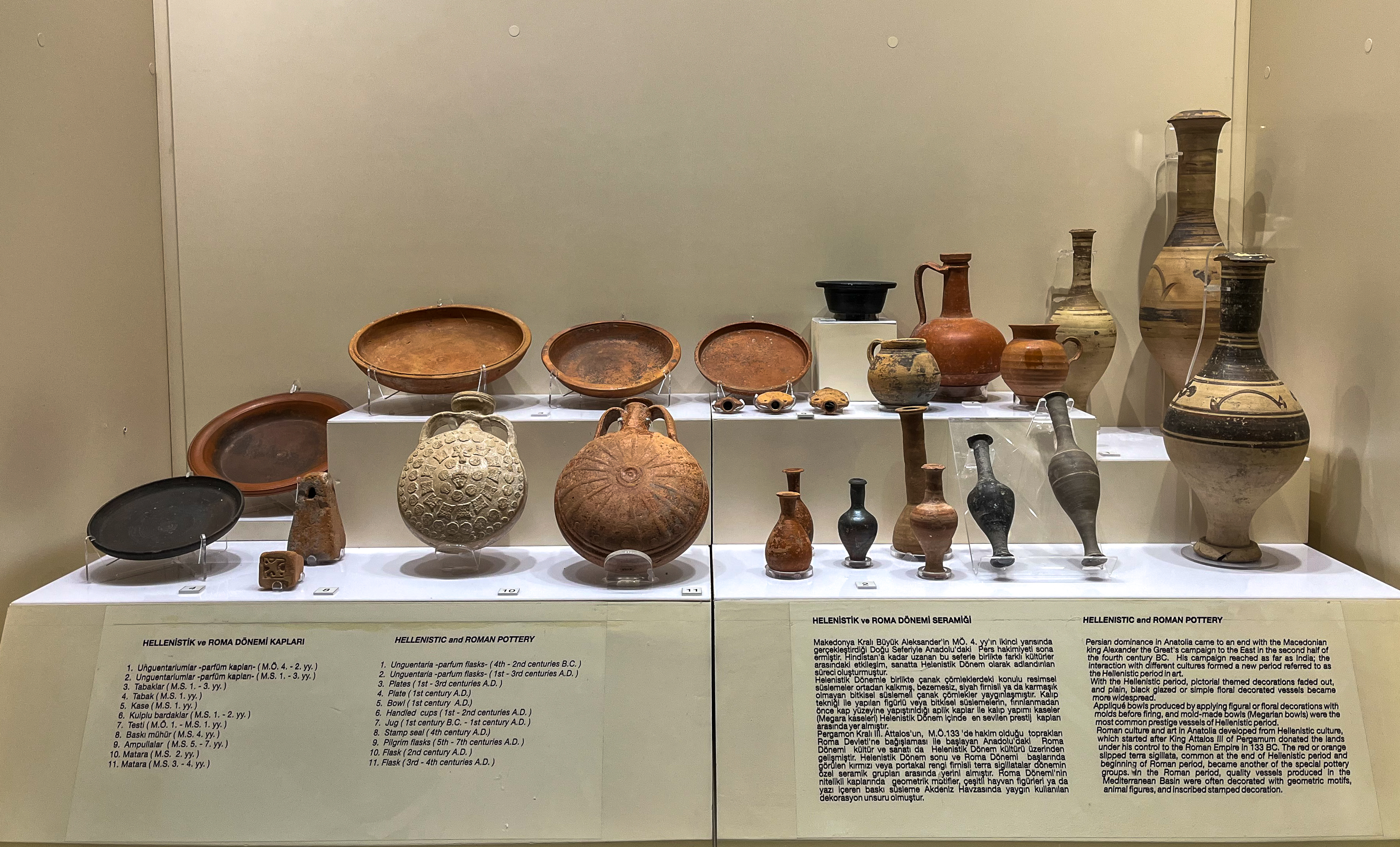
Hellenistic and Roman Period vessels

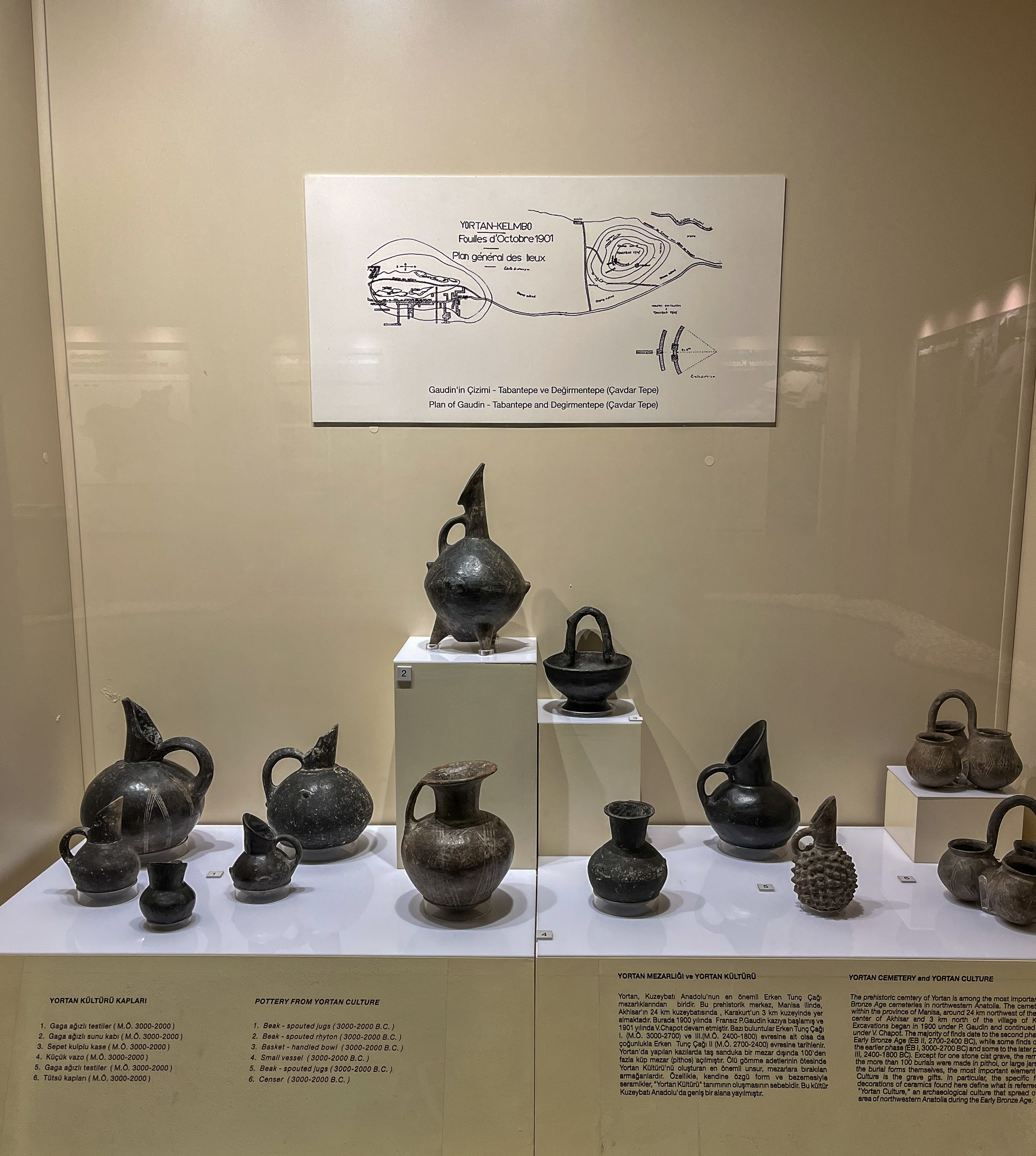
Vessels from the Yortan Culture

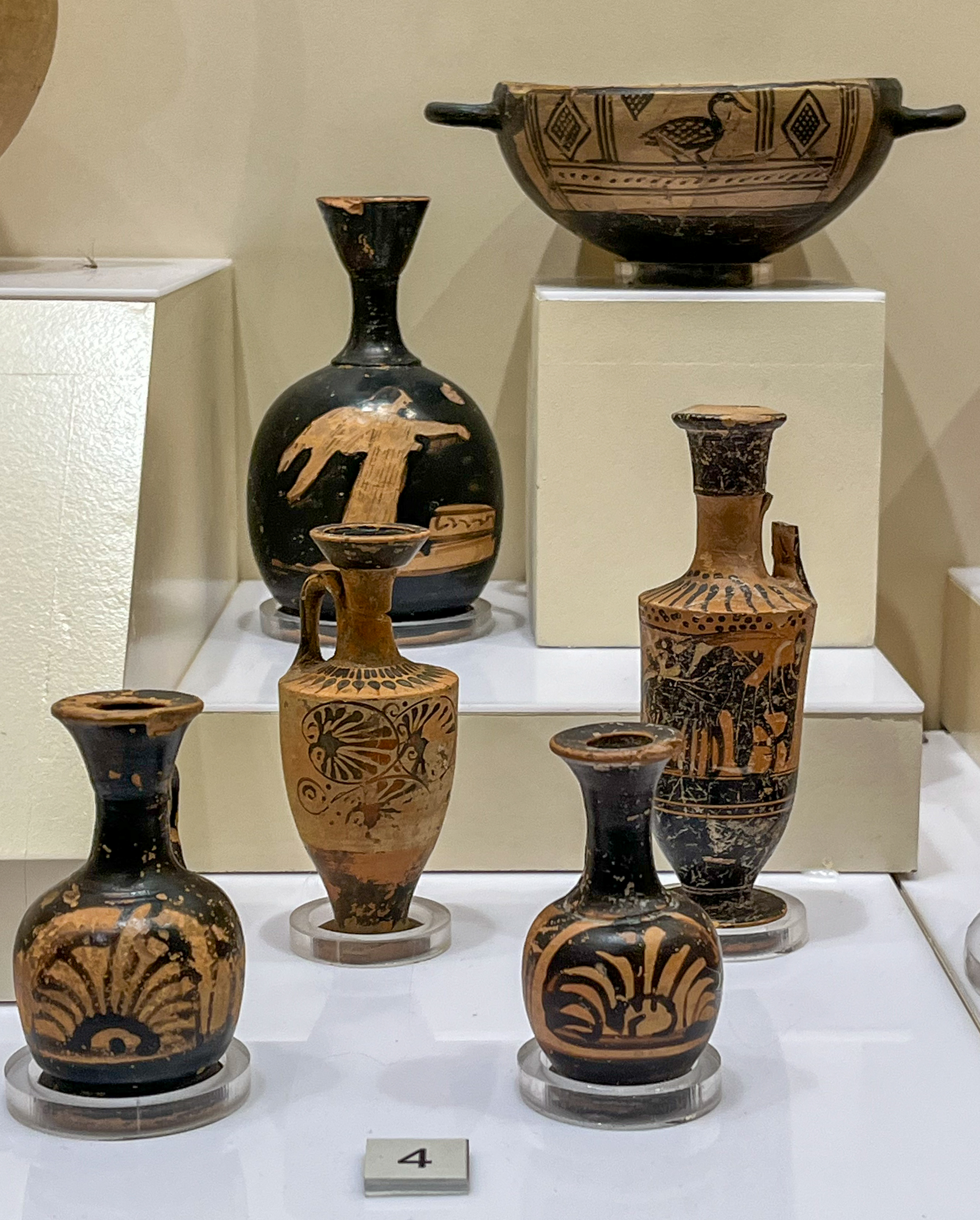
Attica lekythoi with mythological scenes and palmette motifs

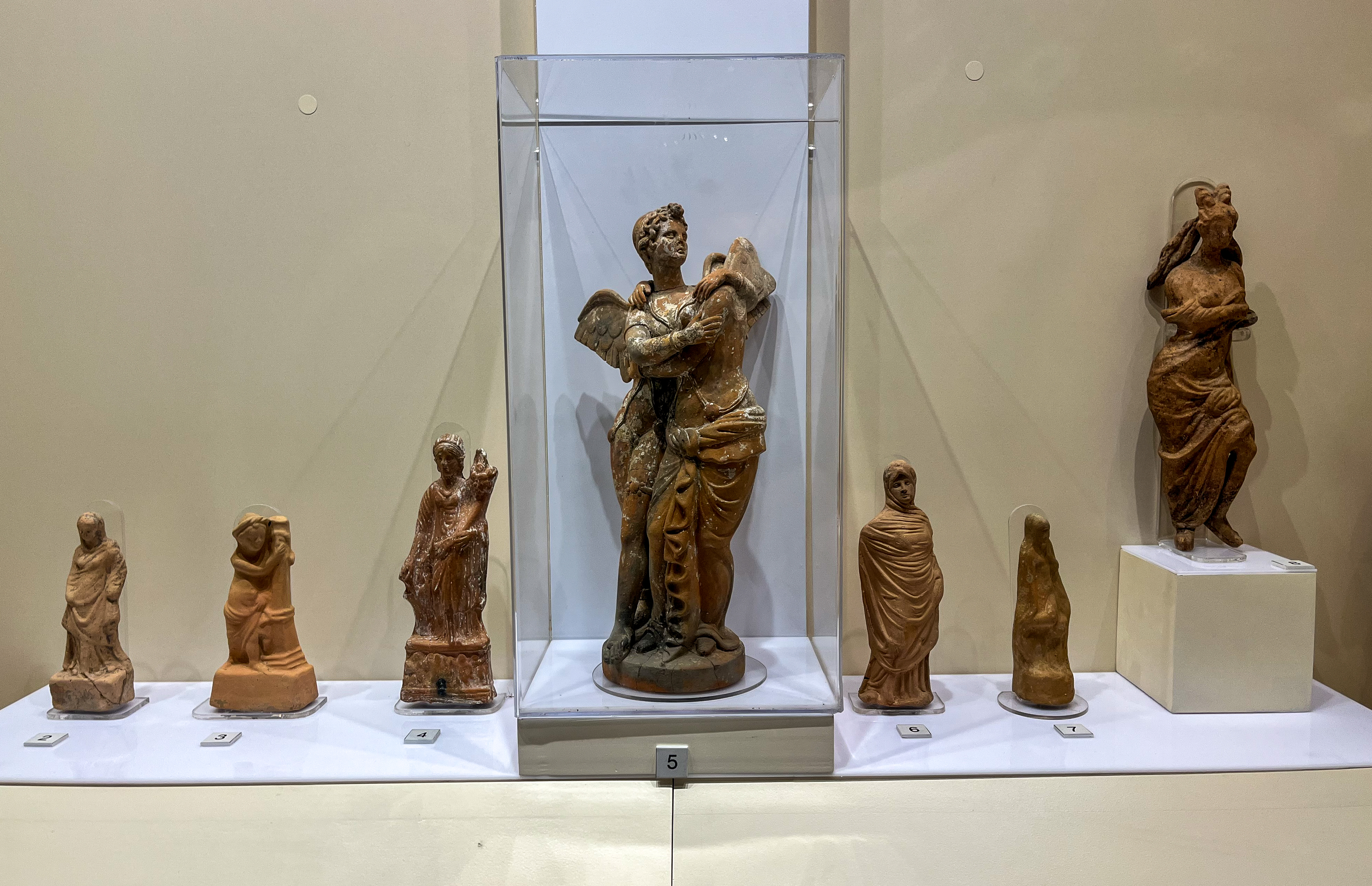
Figurines from the Classical Greek and Roman periods

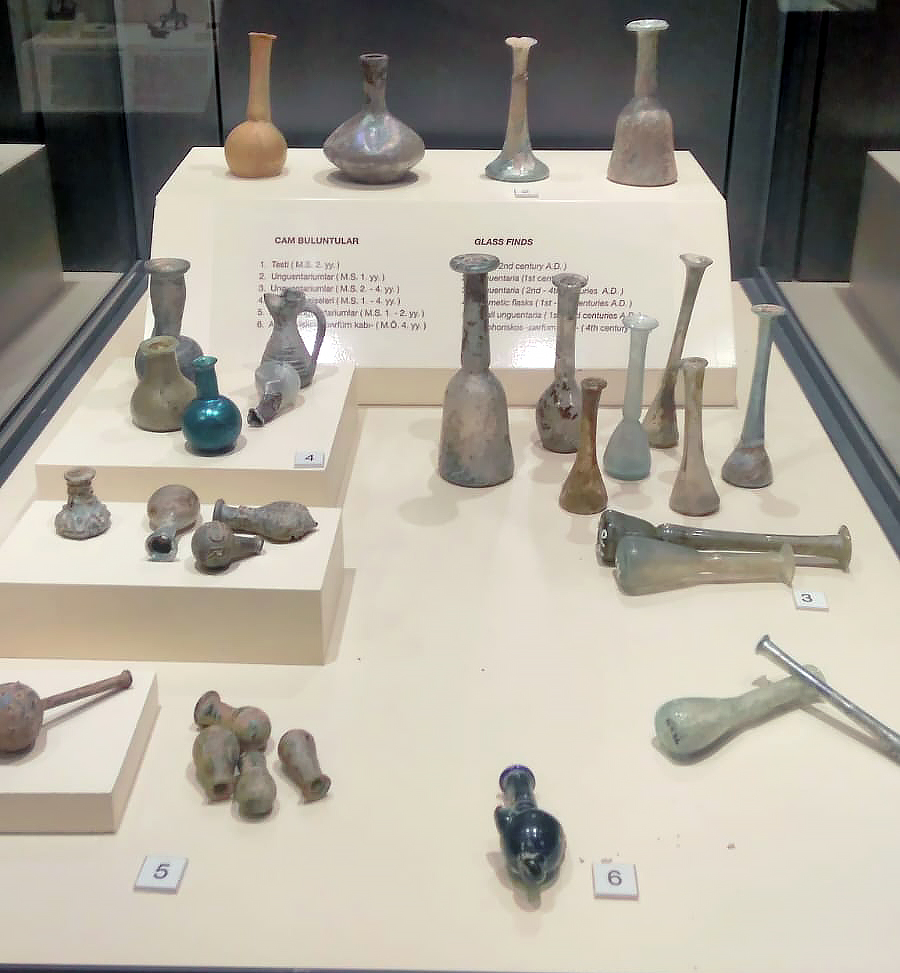
Unguentaria, also known as tear bottles

=== Ethnography section ===
The ethnography section encompasses historical and cultural artifacts spanning from the Seljuk and Ottoman periods to the early years of the Republic. This section features coin collections from the Seljuk and Ottoman eras. Additionally, an 18th-century Quran, various manuscripts from the Ottoman period, and imperial edicts of Ottoman sultans are displayed. Ceramic tiles adorned with calligraphic art are also part of this collection.

The section also includes seals from the Ottoman period belonging to the Akhisar Municipality. Çanakkale ceramics are among the exhibited items. Traditional men’s and women’s clothing, jewelry, carpet samples, and kaftans provide examples of the region’s cultural attire and woven products.

Daily-use items from past periods are also featured in this section. Glass bowls, plates, and pitchers are displayed among kitchenware. Objects related to coffee culture and bathhouse items form part of the collection. Traditional hand-embroidered works are included as examples of handicrafts.

Items used for lighting and defense purposes are also exhibited in this section. Ottoman-era oil lamps, pistols, rifles, and swords of various sizes make up the collection. These artifacts offer diverse examples of the lifestyle and tools used during their respective periods.

==== Arasta ====
The Arasta section, located within the ethnography section, is an area that showcases objects related to Akhisar’s historical and cultural heritage, reflecting the region’s trade and craft activities. This section displays items associated with tobacco cultivation, a significant livelihood in the 19th and 20th centuries, including bale-pressing crates, tobacco-threading needles, hoes, and spraying equipment.

The section also highlights traditional handicrafts and trades. Tools and equipment related to tinsmithing, saddlery, saddle-making, and the production of Akhisar-specific horse-drawn carriages and phaetons are exhibited. Additionally, a display case titled "Keçeci Orhan" (Feltmaker Orhan) is dedicated to Orhan Patoğlu, a local feltmaker from Akhisar. This display features felt items produced by Patoğlu, various shepherd’s cloaks, and the tools he used in their production. Objects and materials related to Akhisar’s guild and coffeehouse culture are also displayed in this section.

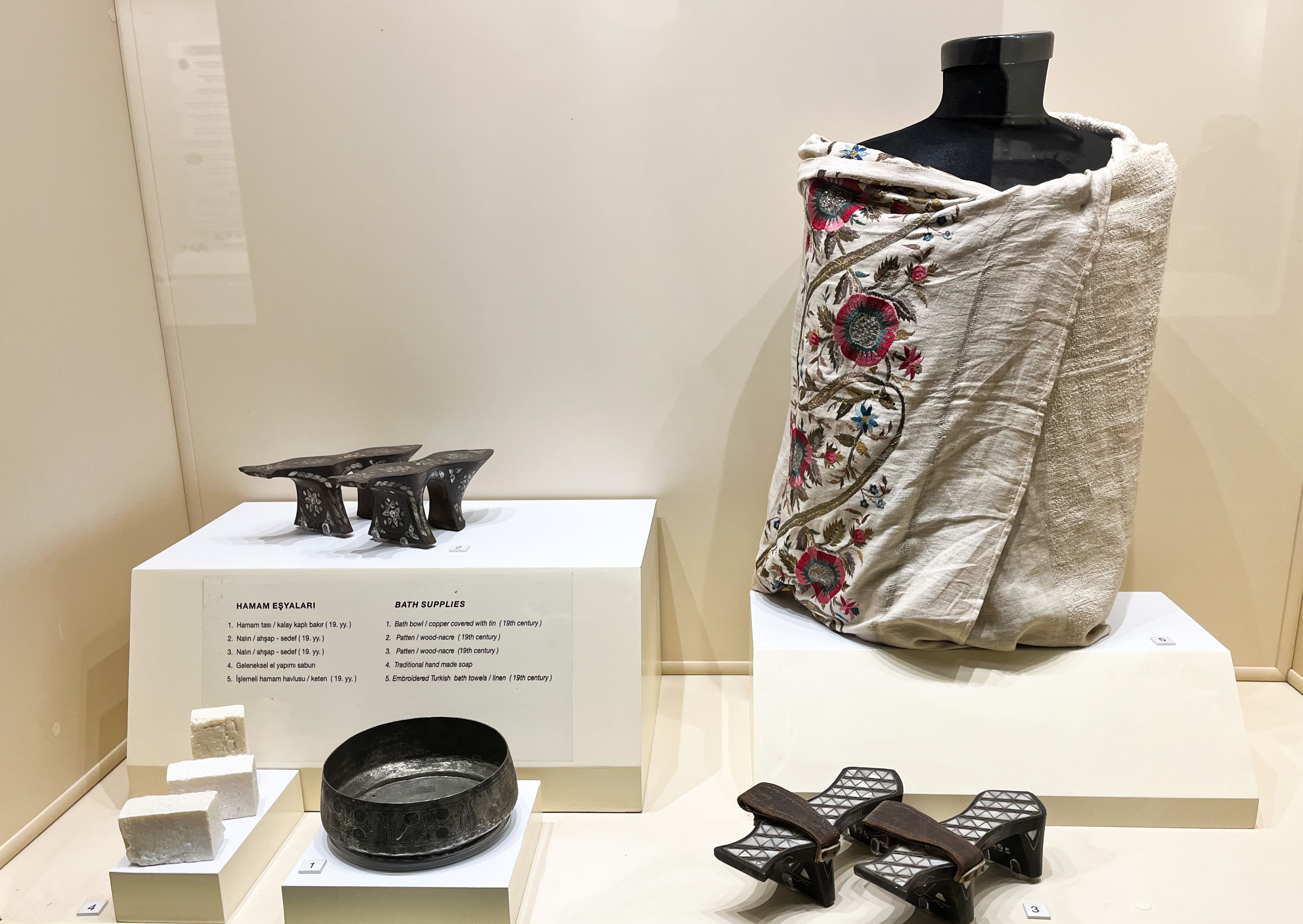
Hammam items

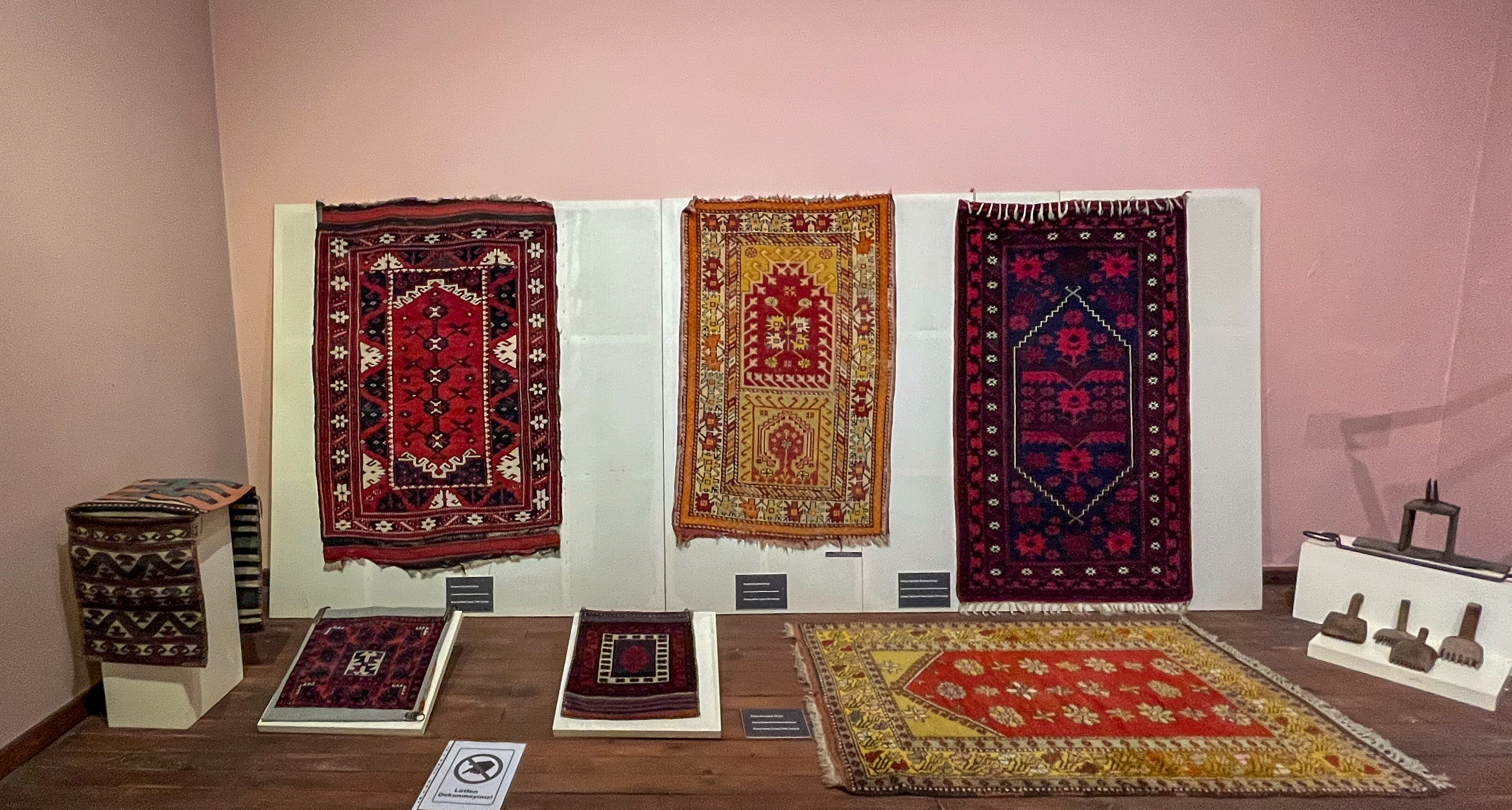
Carpets

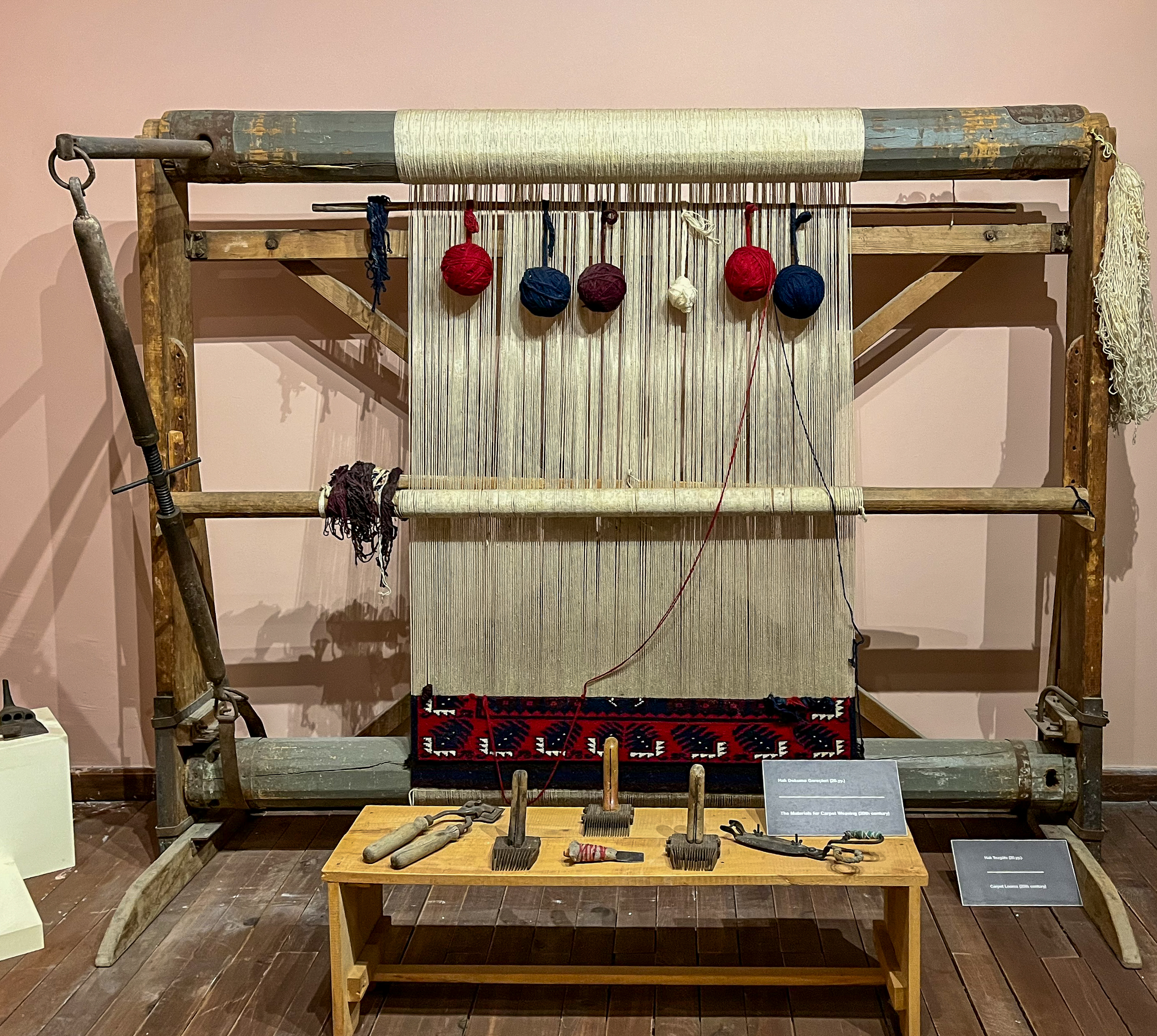
Carpet weaving loom

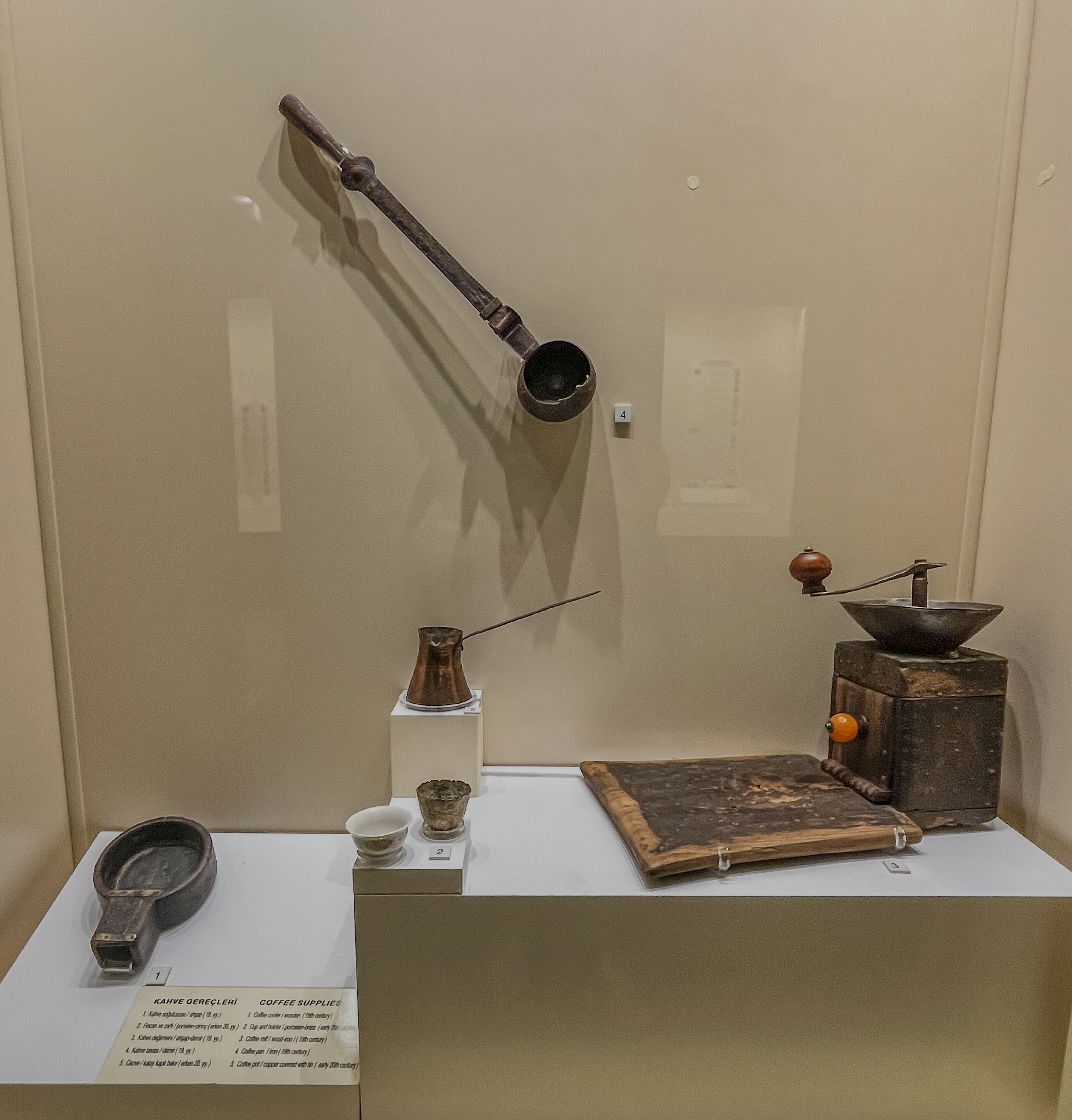
Coffee-making items

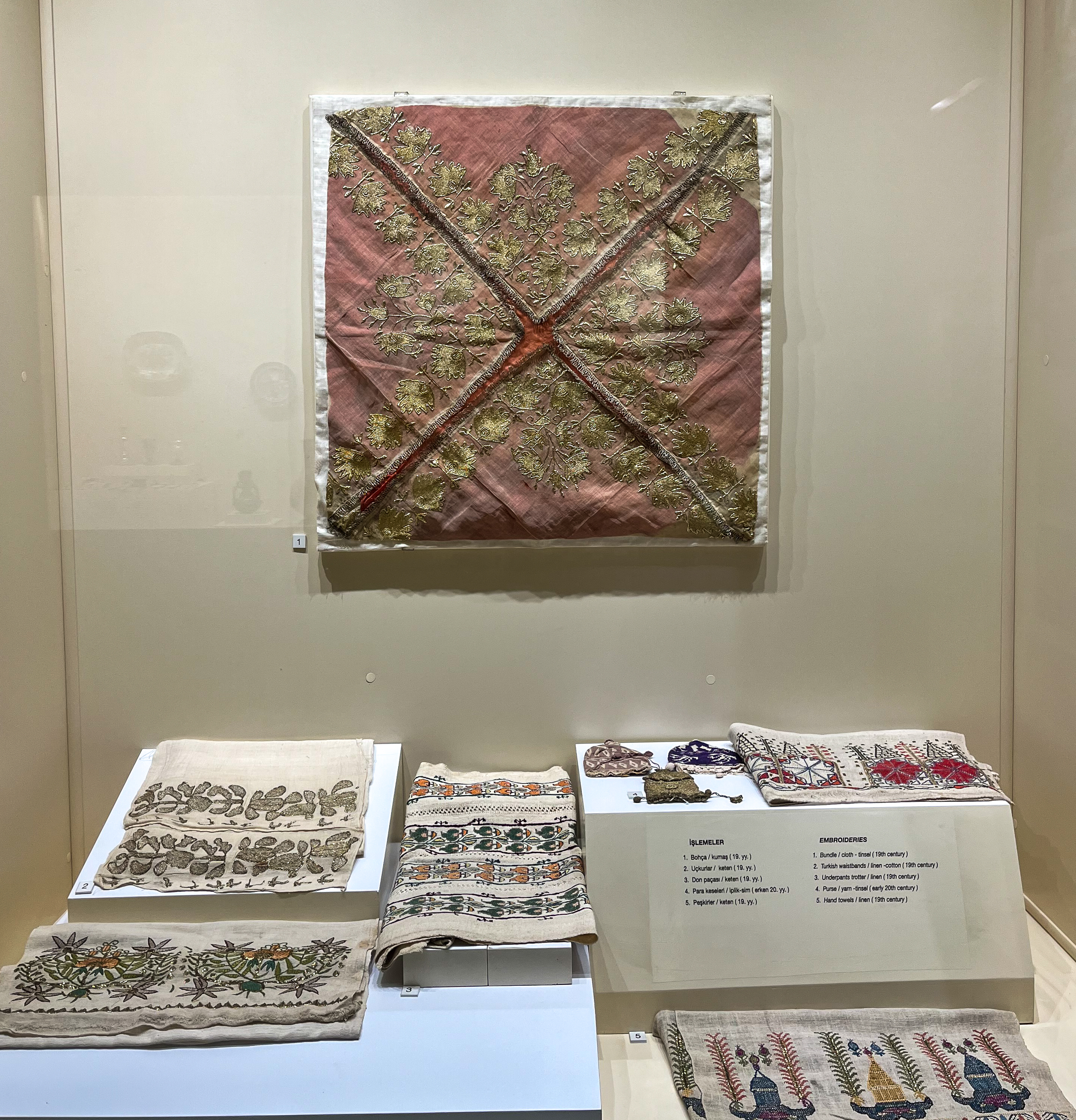
Hand-embroidered works

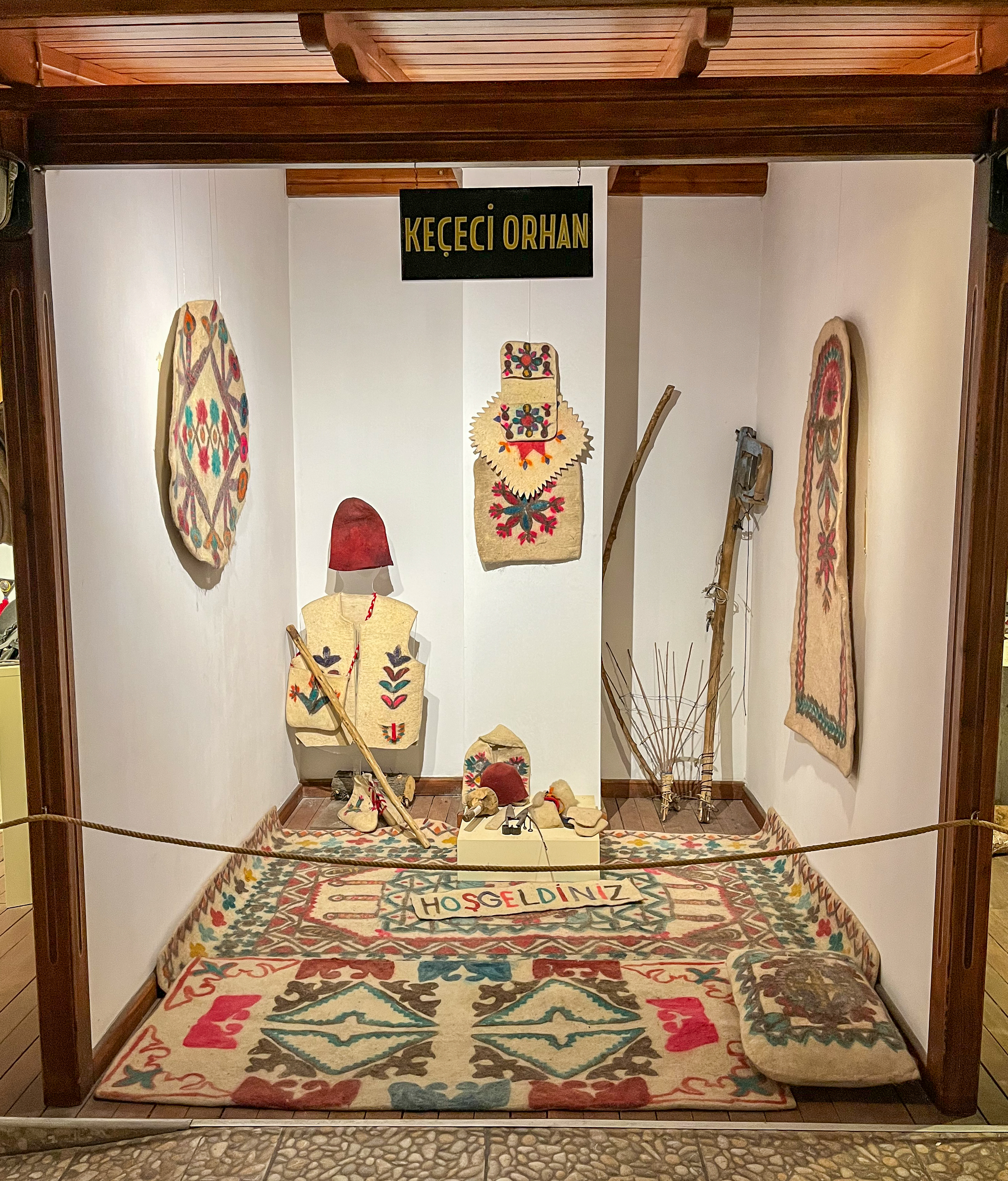
Orhan Patoğlu’s felt items on display in the museum
