= Orhan Patoğlu =

- Born: 1934; Akhisar, Manisa, Turkey
- Died: 9 September 2015 (aged 80–81); Akhisar, Manisa, Turkey
- Resting place: Su Yolu Cemetery, Akhisar, Manisa, Turkey
- Occupation: Felt maker
- Years active: 1953–2015

Orhan Patoğlu (1934, Akhisar – 9 September 2015, Akhisar), was a Turkish feltmaker. He was regarded as one of the last masters to preserve and develop the traditional handicraft of felt-making. He practiced felt-making for many years, particularly in the Akhisar district of Manisa, contributing significantly to the preservation of the region's felt-making tradition.

== Life and career ==
Orhan Patoğlu was born in 1934 in the Akhisar district of Manisa. He began learning the craft of felt-making from his father at a young age. After completing primary school, he briefly trained in carpentry, but later returned to felt-making at his father's encouragement. In 1953, he opened his own felt-making workshop and embarked on his professional career.

Throughout his career, Orhan Patoğlu continued traditional felt-making techniques in his production. He focused on creating items such as shepherd's cloaks, prayer rugs, wall decorations, and other traditional products made from felt. In 1959, he introduced a wool-carding machine, and in the 1970s, he adopted a beating machine, partially modernizing his production processes. In 2006, with support from the Akhisar Municipality, the "Akhisar Felt Workshop" was established, where Patoğlu began passing down his expertise to younger generations.

Patoğlu contributed to efforts to preserve felt-making as part of Turkey's cultural heritage, participating in local fairs and symposiums. In 2013, an academic paper about him was presented at the “International Symposium of Traditional Handicraft Masters.”

The felt items produced by Orhan Patoğlu have been exhibited in various museums, including the Akhisar Museum, as well as in private collections. He played a key role in preserving felt-making techniques specific to Akhisar and its surroundings, serving as a master instructor at Public Education Centers and sharing his knowledge through educational programs.

== Death and legacy ==
Orhan Patoğlu died on 9 September 2015 while receiving treatment in a hospital. His funeral was held at Hergelen Mosque in Akhisar, after which he was buried in Su Yolu Cemetery in Akhisar. Following his death, the Akhisar Municipality created a memorial corner in his workshop in his honor. Additionally, a display case named "Keçeci Orhan" (Feltmaker Orhan) is dedicated to him in the ethnography section of the Akhisar Museum. This display features felt items produced by Patoğlu, various shepherd's cloaks, and the tools he used in their production.

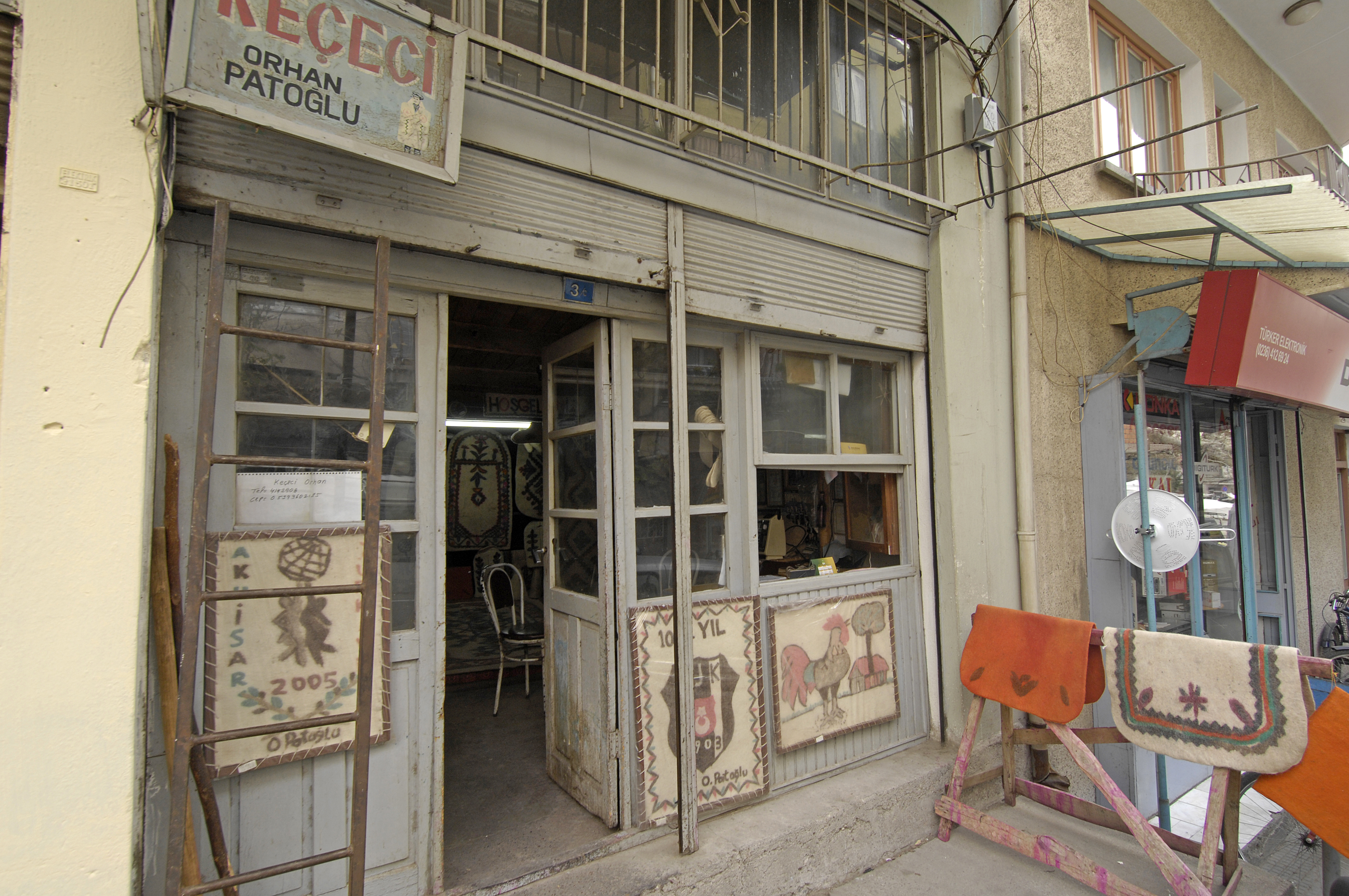
Orhan Patoğlu's workshop in Akhisar, 2007

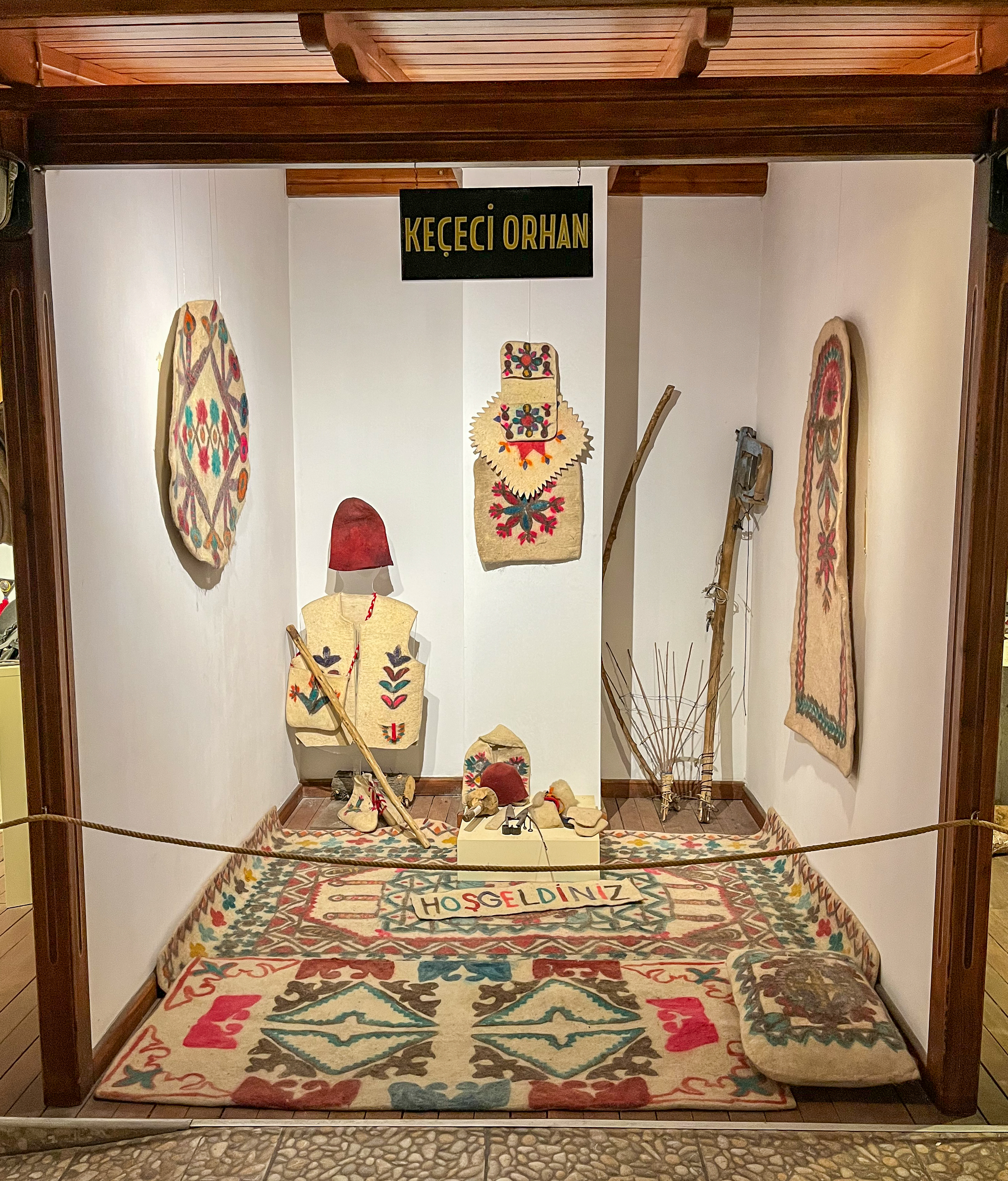
Display case at the Akhisar Museum featuring Patoğlu's felt items

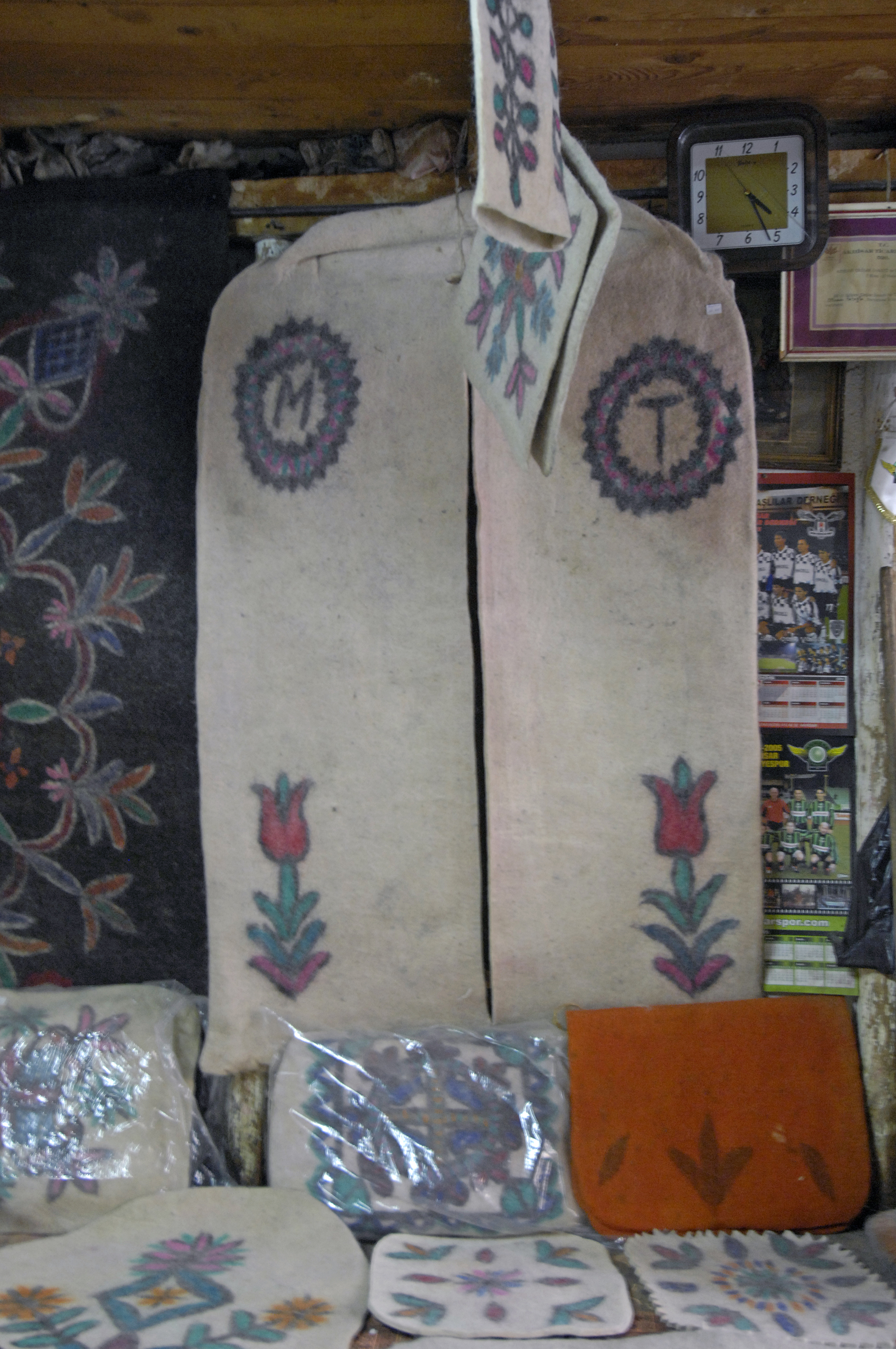
Patoğlu's shepherd's cloak

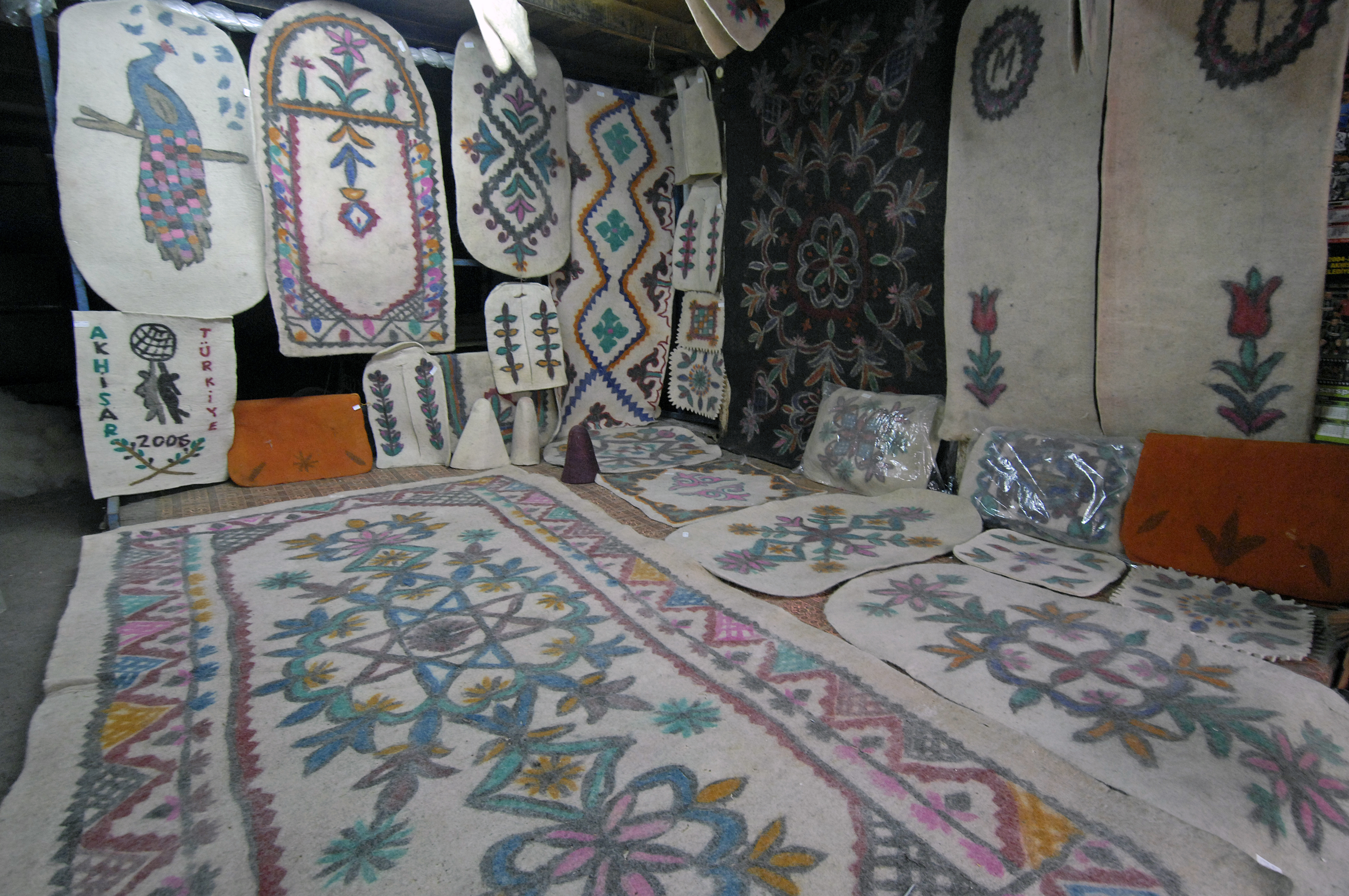
Patoğlu's felt items

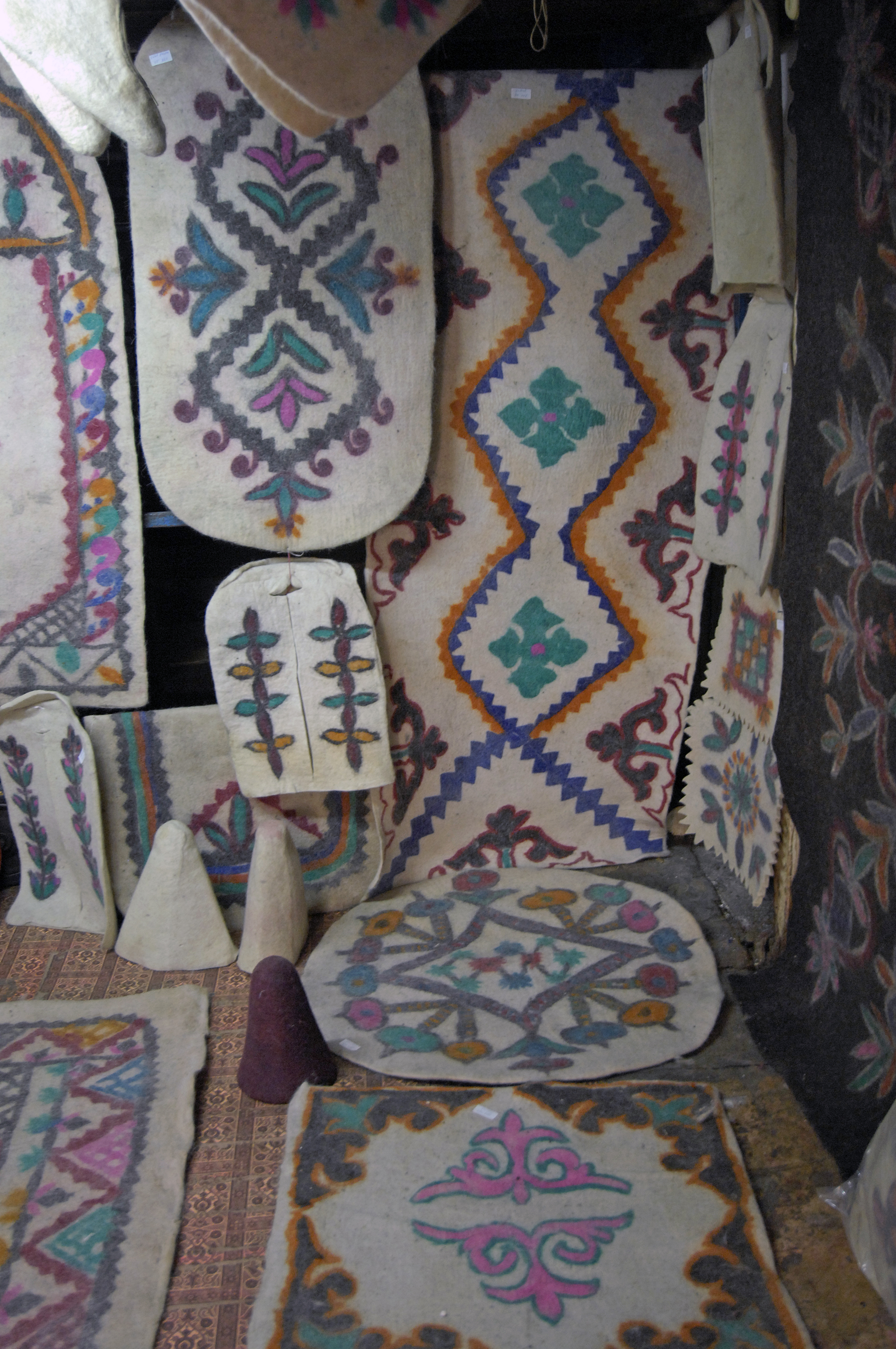
Patoğlu's felt items

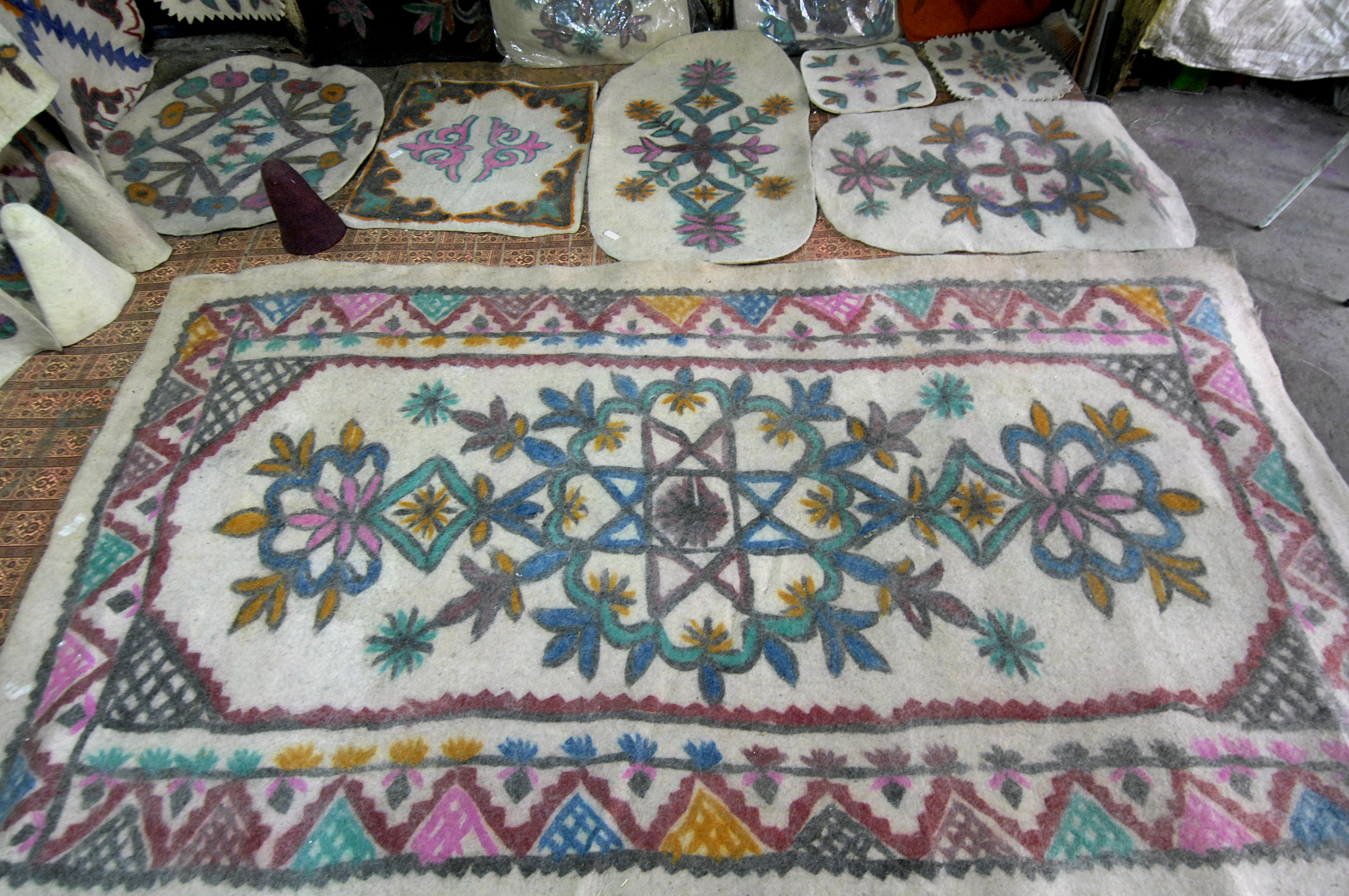
Patoğlu's felt items
