= Muradiye Mosque =

Muradiye Mosque may refer to:

- Muradiye Mosque, Manisa
- Muradiye Mosque, Edirne
