= Manisa Museum =

Museum in Turkey

- Manisa Müzesi
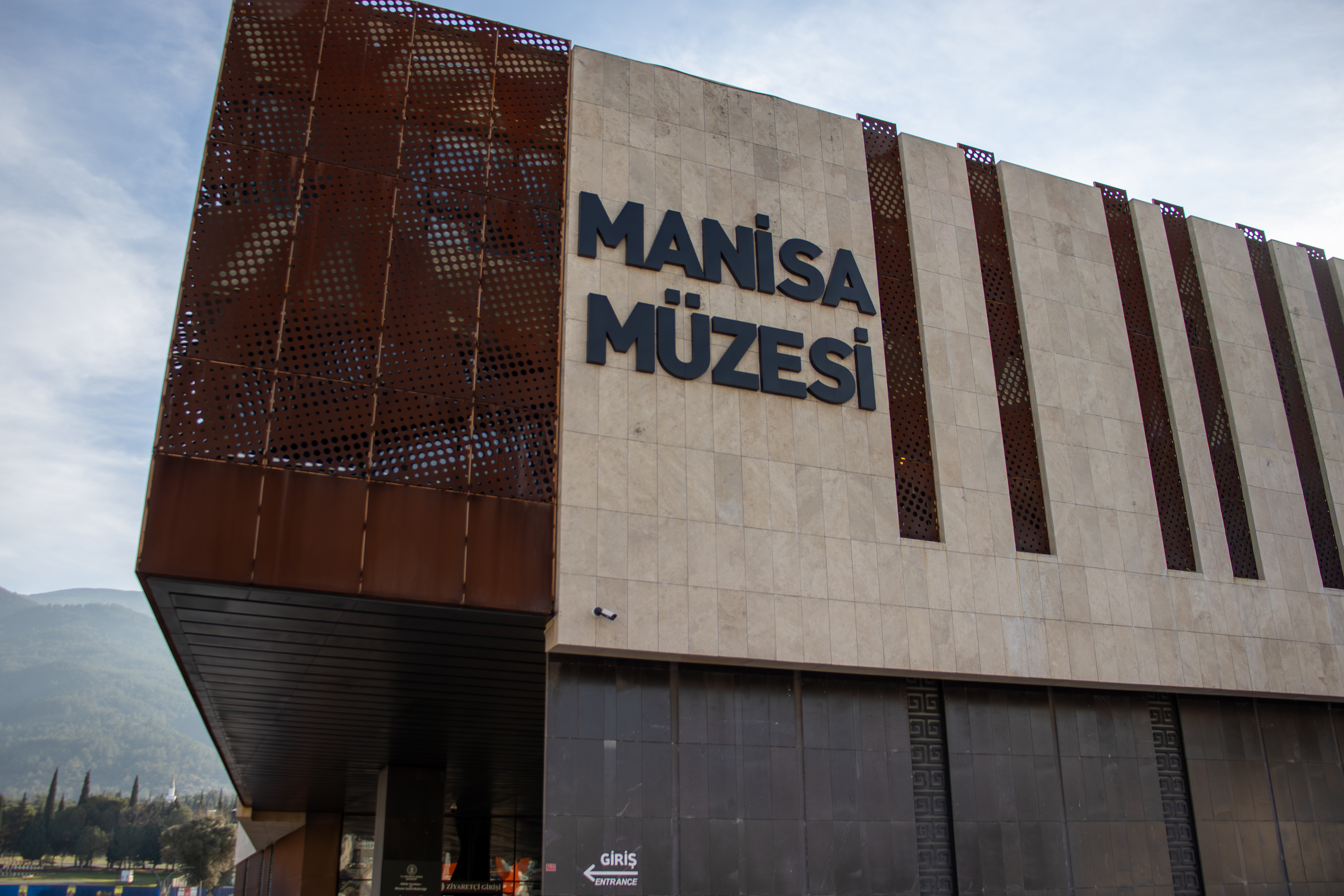

- Location within Turkey
- Established: 1937
- Location: Manisa, Turkey
- Coordinates: 38.61030°N 27.42986°E
- Type: Archeology
- Website: www.manisakulturturizm.gov.tr/belge/1-56221/muzeler.html

Manisa Museum is an archeological museum within the Manisa Museum, situated in the historic kulliye of Muradiye Mosque built by Mimar Sinan. Local and regional artefacts from antique Magnesia, Sardes and other regional towns are displayed. The museum displays cover a wide range of eras from prehistory to the 20th century. Ethnography Museum is in the nearby building. The museum was opened on October 29, 1937.
