= Manisa =

Metropolitan municipality in Manisa Province, Aegean Region, Turkey

- Metropolitan municipality
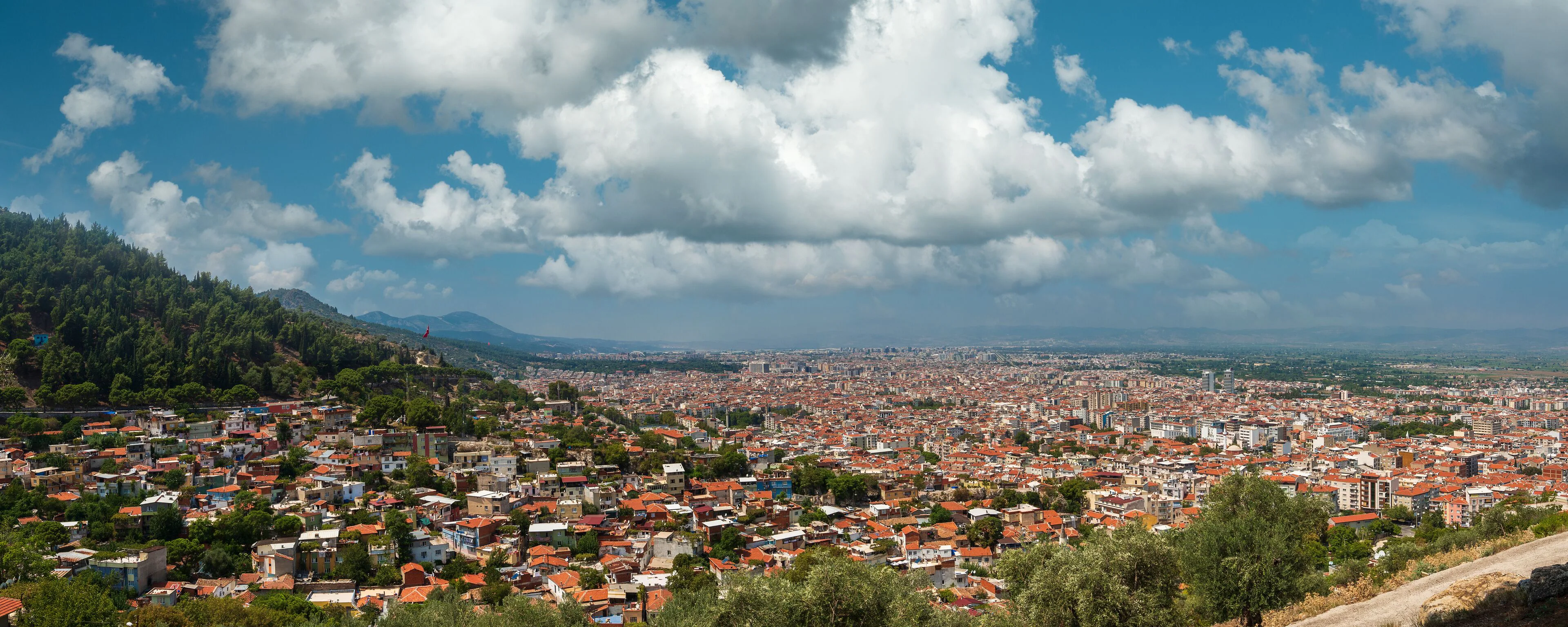
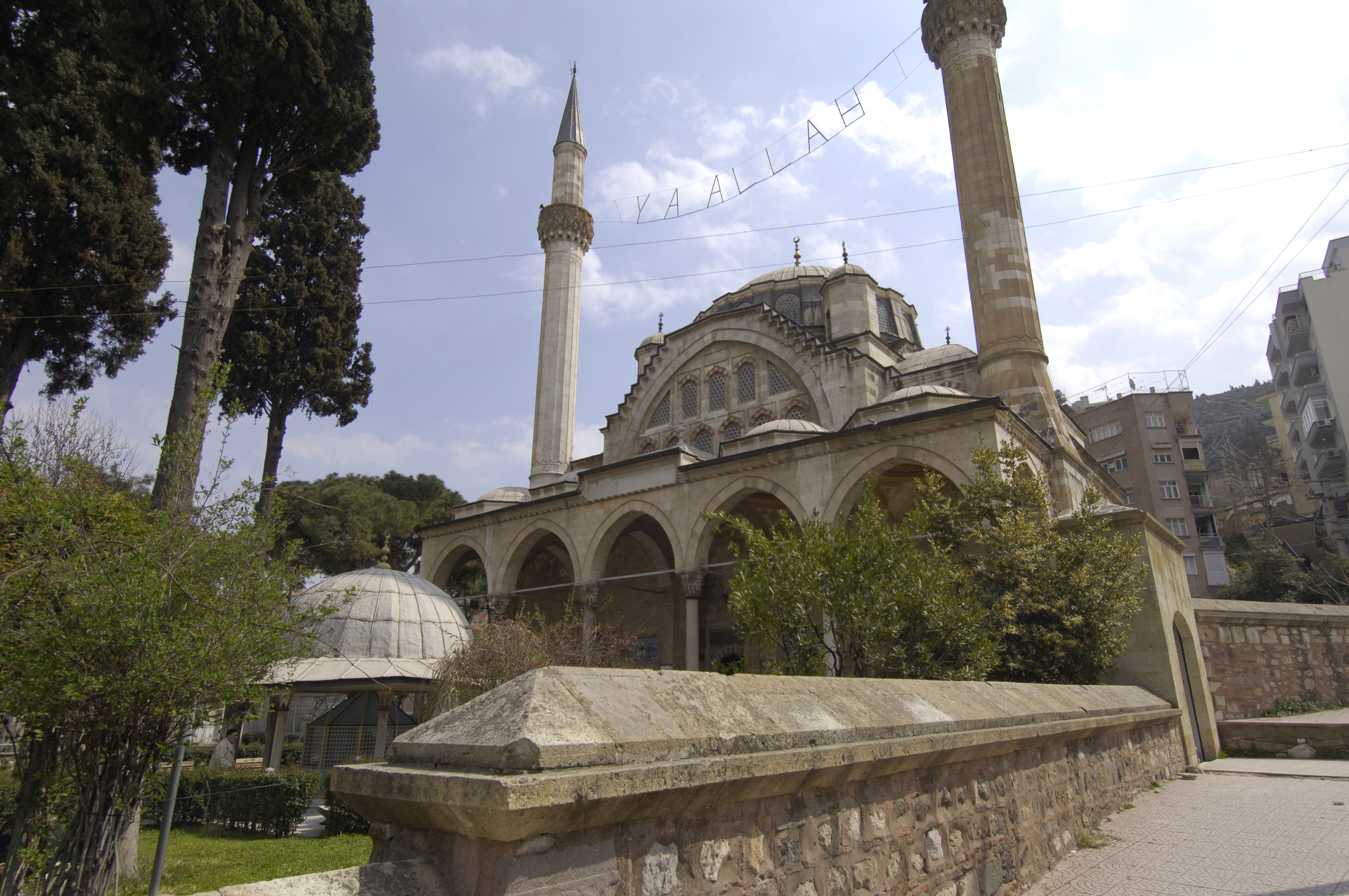
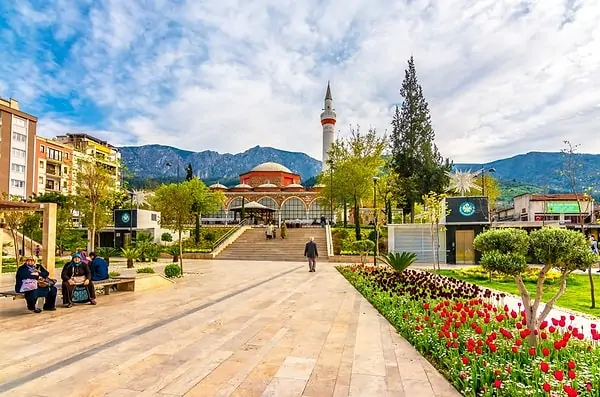
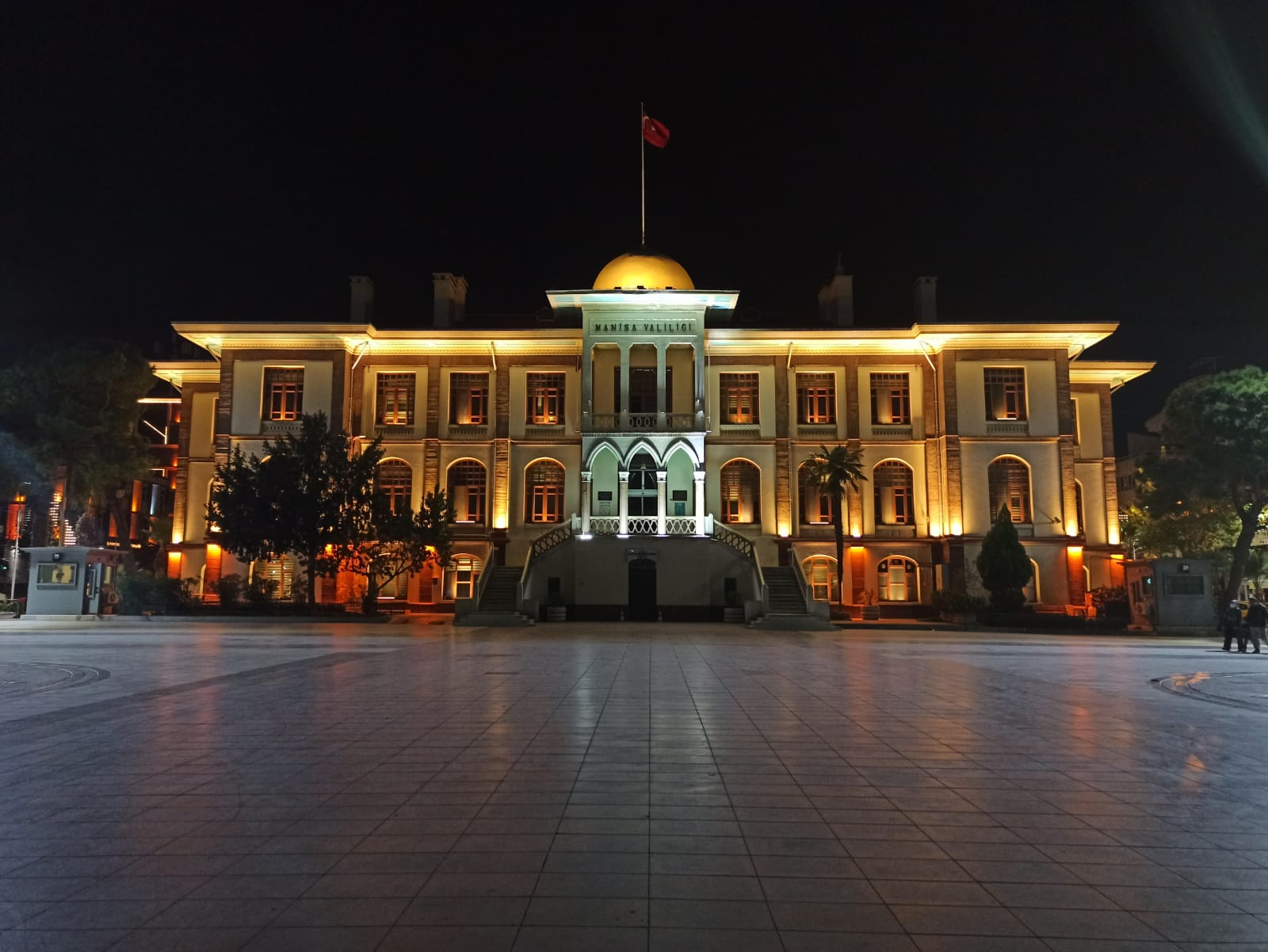
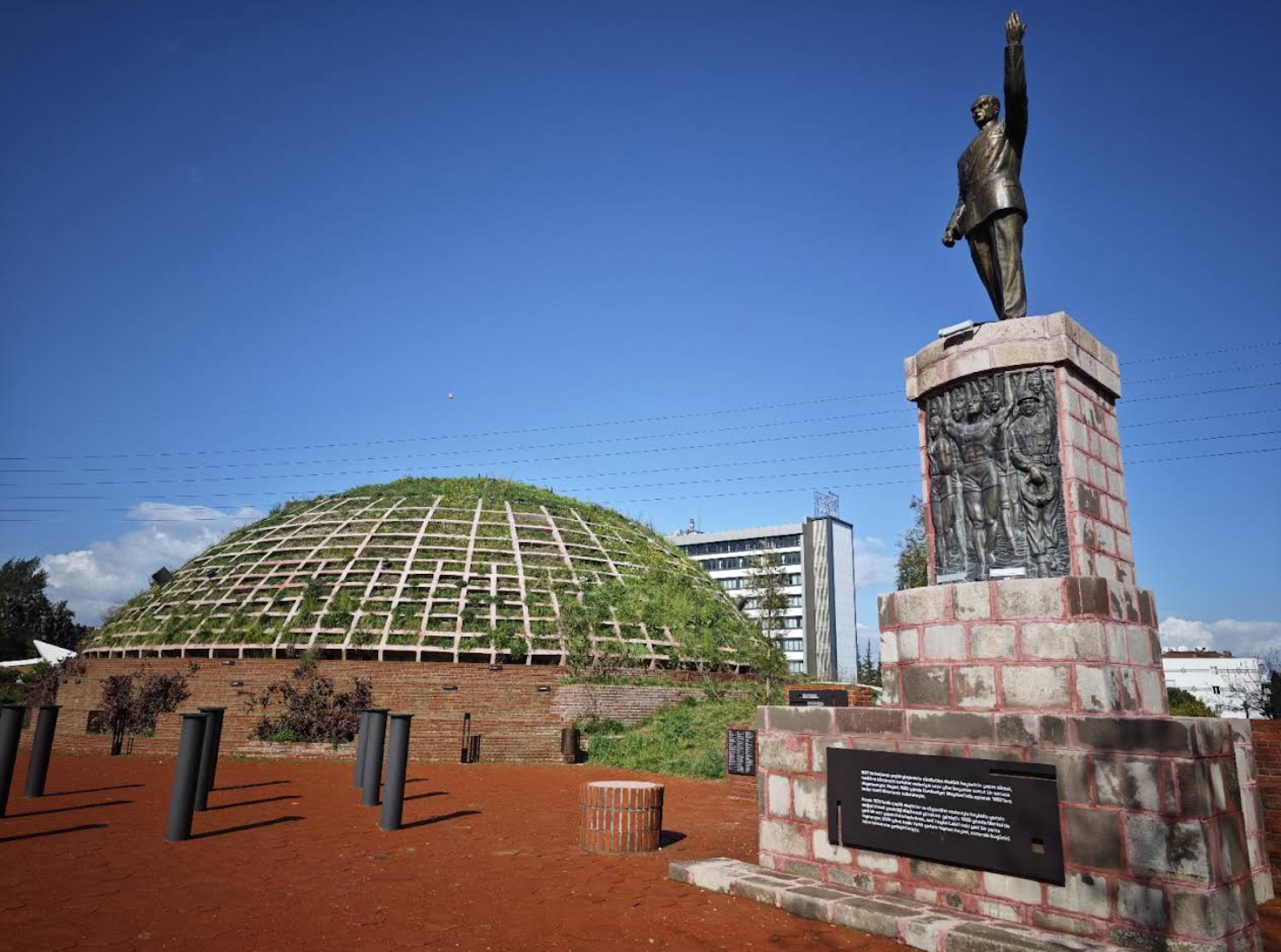
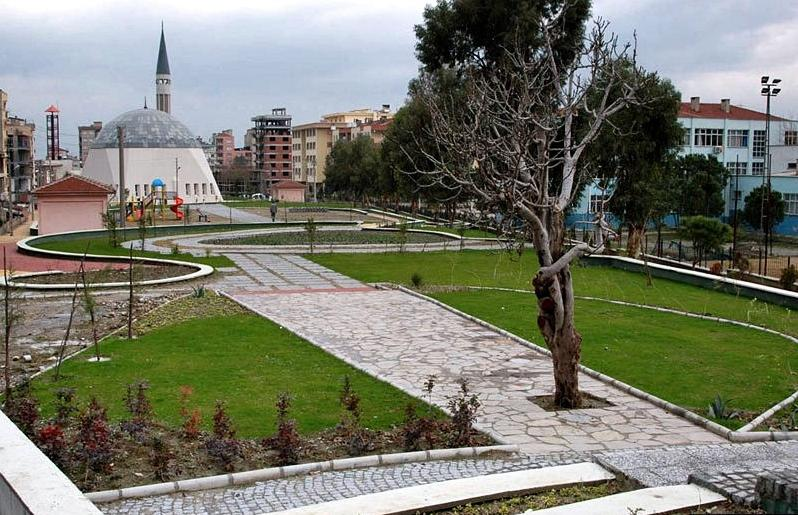
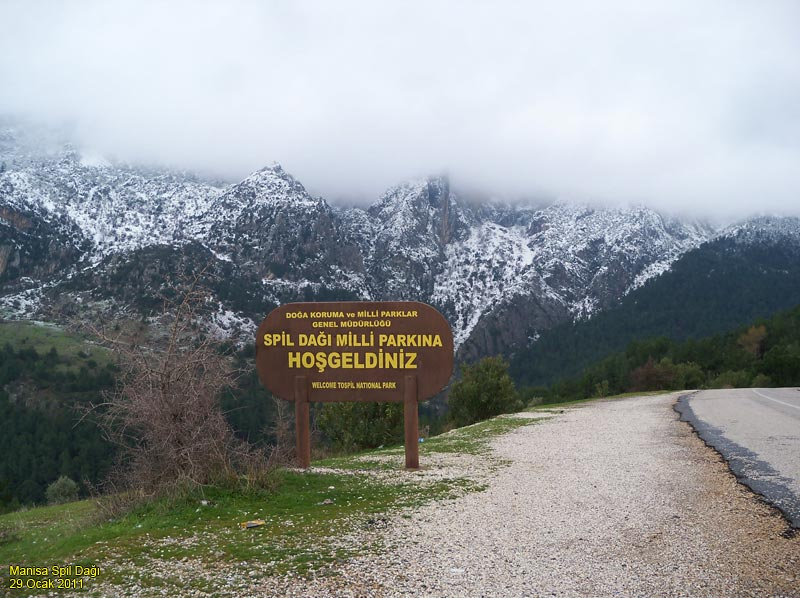
- Top to bottom, left to right: Manisa Bird Paradise; Muradiye Mosque; Cumhuriyet Square and Park; Government House; Manisa Museum; Merkez Efendi Park Mosque; view of Mount Spil

- Emblem of Manisa Metropolitan Municipality

- Location within Turkey Location within Europe
- Coordinates: 38°36′52″N 27°25′45″E
- Country: Turkey
- Province: Manisa

Government
  - Mayor: Besim Dutlulu (CHP)
- Elevation: 71 m (233 ft)

Population (2022)
  - City: 385,452
  - Rank: 15th in Turkey; 24th (Agglomeration)
  - Urban: 425,000
  - Metro (Metro municipality): 1,490,486
- Time zone: UTC+3 (TRT)
- Website: www.manisa.bel.tr

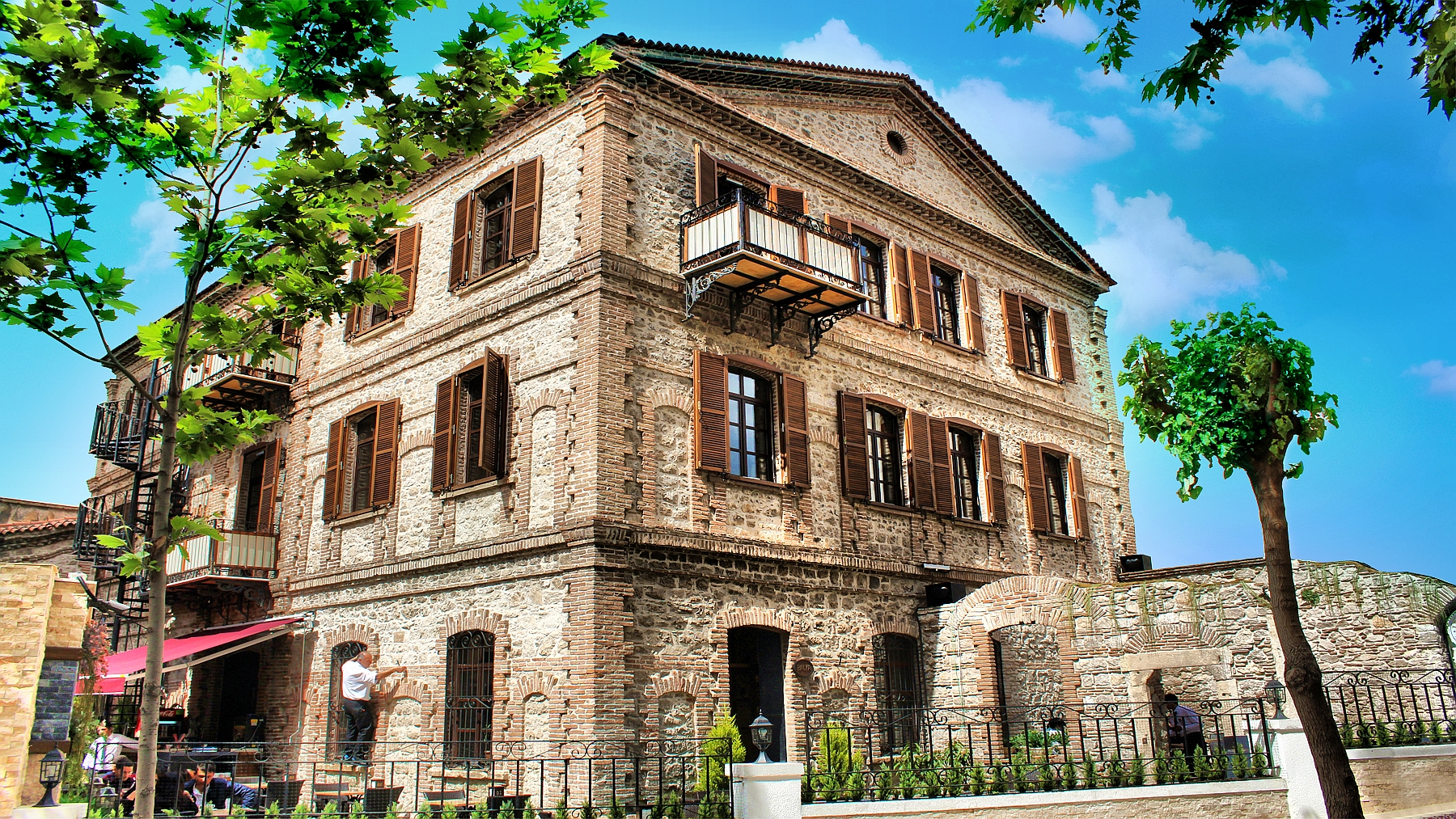
Stone factory in Manisa

Manisa (Turkish pronunciation: [maˈnisa]) is a city in Turkey and the administrative seat of Manisa Province, lying approximately 40 km northeast of the major city of İzmir. The city forms the urban part of the districts Şehzadeler and Yunusemre, with a population of 385,452 in 2022.

Modern Manisa is a center of industry and services, advantaged by its closeness to the international port city and the regional metropolitan center of İzmir and by its hinterland rich in quantity and variety of agricultural production. İzmir's proximity also adds dense traffic of daily commuters between the two cities, separated by a half-hour drive served by a six-lane highway across Mount Sipylus's mythic scenery.

The historic part of Manisa spreads out from a forested valley in the immediate slopes of Sipylus mountainside, along Çaybaşı Stream which flows next to Niobe's "Weeping Rock" ("Ağlayan Kaya"), an ancient bridge called the "Red Bridge" ("Kırmızı Köprü") as well as to several tombs-shrines in the Turkish style dating back to the Saruhan period (14th century). Under Ottoman rule in the centuries that followed, the city had already extended into the undulated terrain at the start of the plain. In the last couple of decades, Manisa's width more than tripled in size across its vast plain formed by the alluvial deposits of the River Gediz, a development in which the construction of new block apartments, industrial zones and of Celal Bayar University campus played a key role.

The city of Manisa is also widely visited, especially during March and September festivals, the former festival being the continuation of a five-hundred-year-old "Mesir Paste Distribution" tradition, and also for the nearby Mount Spil national park. It is also a departure point for other visitor attractions of international acclaim which are located nearby within Manisa's depending region, such as Sardes and Alaşehir (ancient Philadelphia) inland. The city also had a Jewish community.

== Name and etymology ==
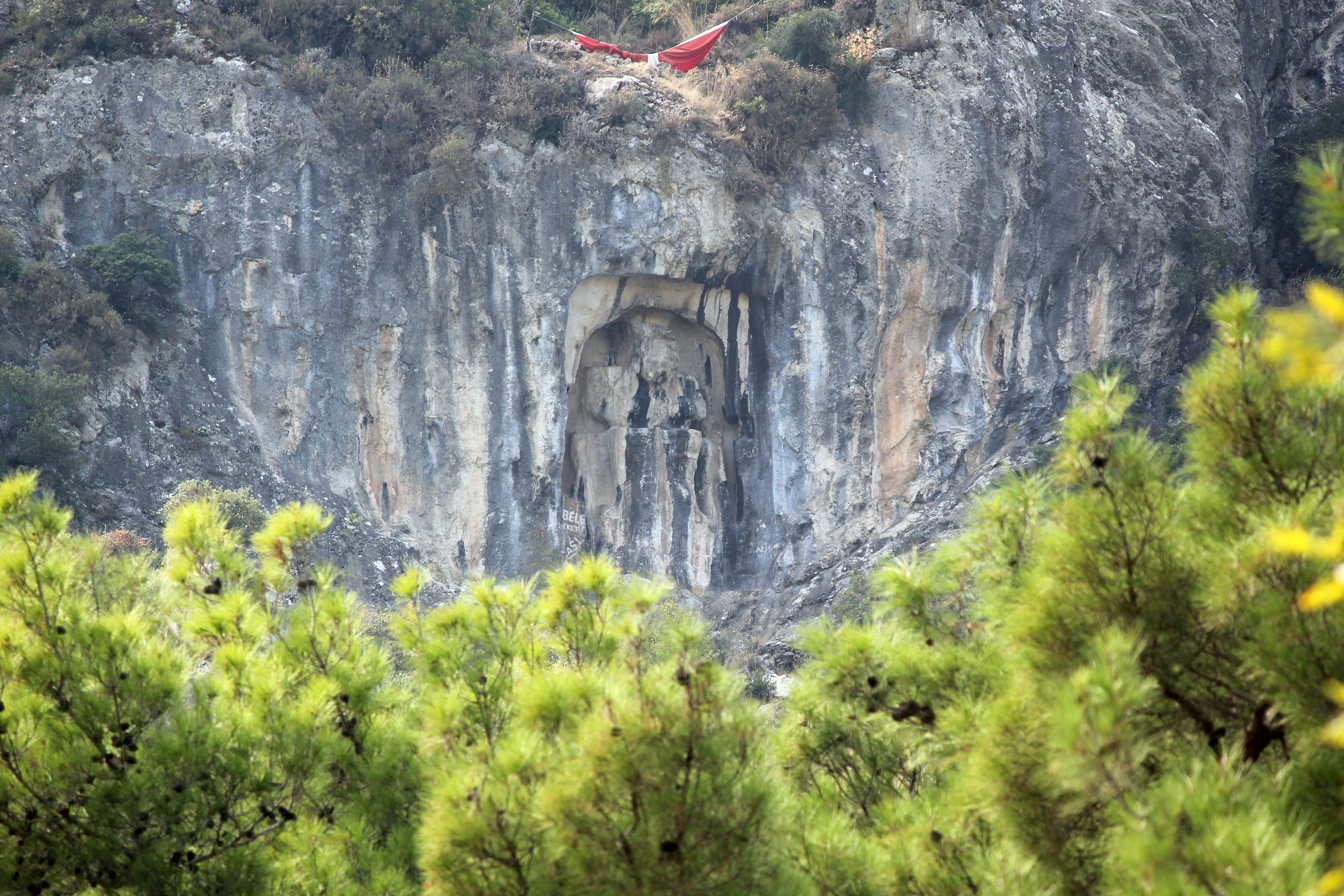
Hittite–Luwian rock carving of Cybele in Mount Sipylus (13th century BC)

Historically, the city was also called Magnesia, and more precisely as Magnesia ad Sipylum, to distinguish it from Magnesia on the Maeander at a relatively short distance to the south. Traditional view held that the name "Magnesia" is derived from the tribe of Magnetes who would have immigrated here from Thessaly at the dawn of the region's recorded history. A connection with native Anatolian languages has also been suggested, particularly on the basis of discoveries made in the Hittite archives. The name is rendered as Μαγνησία in ancient and modern Greek language.

The name "Magnesia ad Sipylus" refers to Mount Sipylus (Mount Spil) that towers over the city and Magnesia became a city of importance starting with the Roman dominion, particularly after the 190 BC Battle of Magnesia. The names "Sipylus" or "Sipylum" in reference to a settlement here are also encountered in some sources, again in reference to the mountain and as abbreviated forms. Pliny the Elder, supported by other sources, mentions that formerly in the same place was a very celebrated city which was called "Tantalis" or "the city of Tantalus" whose ruins were still visible around his time.

Under Turkish rule, the name attached to the Beys of "Saruhan", who founded the Beylik which preceded the Ottomans in the region, has been officially used, along with the name Manisa, for the city and the region alternatively and this until the present period of the Republic of Turkey. The Ottoman Turkish form of the name "Manisa" (ماغنيسا) was usually as it is still used presently, but a spelling with a longer first syllable, transcribed to modern Turkish as "Mağnisa", was also occasionally encountered. During the first centuries of the Ottoman Empire, many of the sons of sultans received their education in Manisa and the city is still commonly known in Turkey as "the city of shahzades" (Şehzadeler şehri), a distinctive title it shares only with Amasya and Trabzon.

The English language root word "magnesia", from which the words "magnet" and "magnetism" and numerous other derivations were coined, as well as their equivalents in many other languages, may derive from the city's name.

== History ==
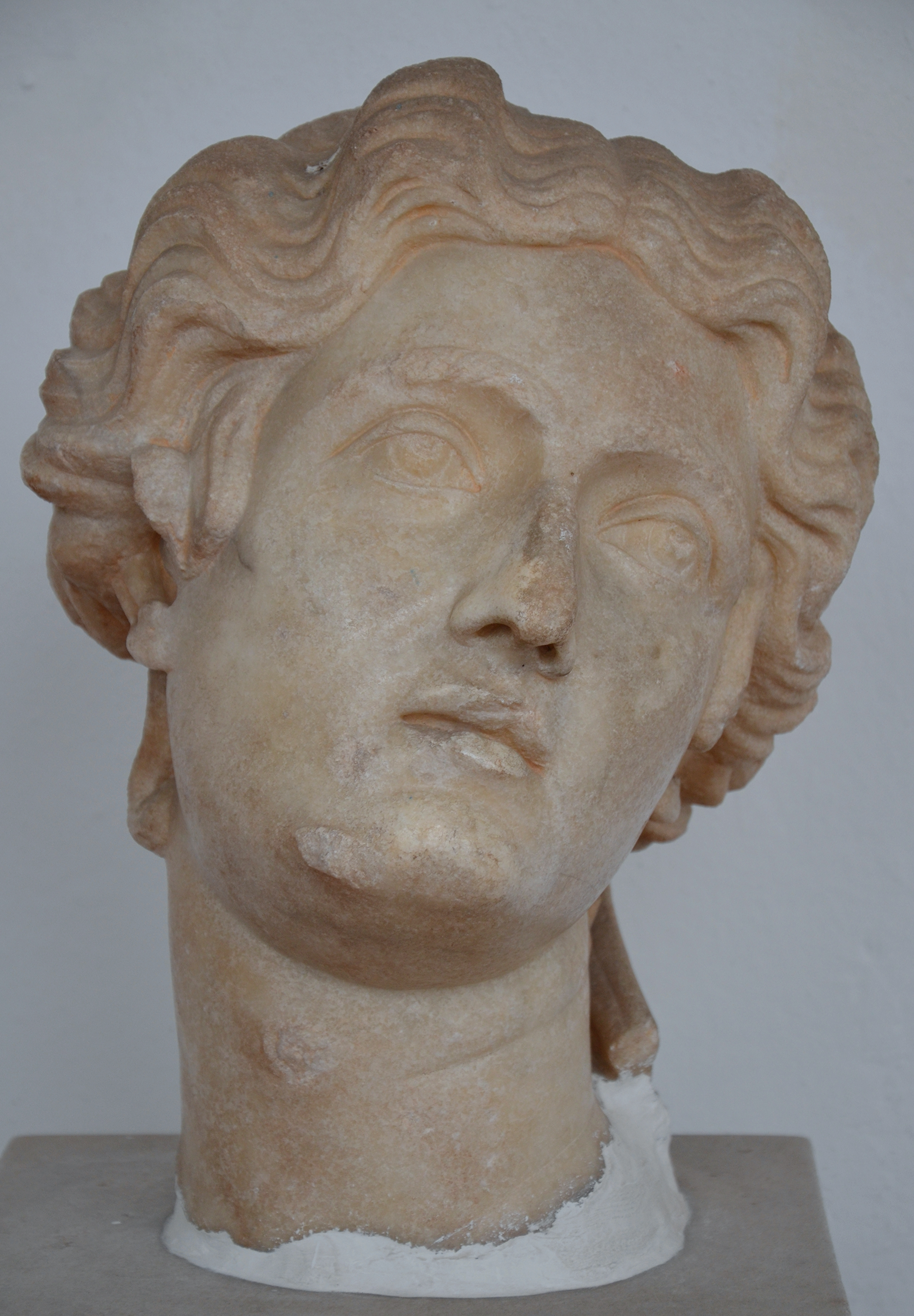
Head of woman, from Philadelphia in Lydia (modern-day Alaşehir), Roman period, Archaeological Museum of Manisa

=== Prehistory ===
Traces of prehistory in the Manisa region, although few in number, nevertheless include two very interesting finds that shed much light on western Anatolia's past. The first are the fossilized footprints, numbering more than fifty and dated to around 20.000-25.000 BC, discovered in 1969 by MTA, Turkey's state body for mineral exploration, in Sindel village near Manisa's depending district of Salihli and referred to under that village's name. Some of these footprints are on display today in Manisa Museum while their site of origin of Sindel, where there are also prehistoric paintings, will reportedly become Turkey's first geopark through a joint project with the European Commission.

=== Early Bronze ===
The second finds are tombs contemporaneous with Troy II (3000-2500 BC) and found in the village of Yortan near Kırkağaç district center, north of Manisa. Original burial practices observed in these sepulchres led scholars to the definition of a "Yortan culture" in Anatolia's prehistory, many of whose aspects remain yet to be explored.

=== Late Bronze Age ===
==== Luwians and Hittites ====
Central and southern parts of western Anatolia entered history with the still obscure Luwian kingdom of Arzawa, probably offshoots, as well as neighbors and, after around 1320 BCE, vassals of the Hittite Empire. Cybele monument located at Akpınar on the northern flank of Mount Sipylus, at a distance of 7 km (4 mi) from Manisa on the road to Turgutlu is, along with the King of Mira rock relief at Mount Nif near Kemalpaşa and a number of cuneiform tablet records are among the principal evidence of extension of Hittite control and influence in western Anatolia based on local principalities. Cybele monument by itself represents a step of innovation in Hittite art where full-faced figures in high relief are rare.

=== Iron Age ===
==== Phrygians and Lydians ====
The first millennium BC saw the emergence in the region of "Phrygians" and "Maeonians", the accounts concerning which are still blended with myths, (Note: While some sources claim that "Meonian" was an earlier name for a "Lydian", another theory holds that Meonians may have preceded Lydians in the region and would have continued their existence as a substratum within the Lydian society, neighboring theirs especially in the mountainous region to the south. While most of what the Lydians could tell about themselves is lost and historians have to rely on secondary sources, a village locally still called "Menye" (officially Gökçeören) exists between the district centers of Kula and Salihli. Ancient traces rich in quantity are visible to the naked eye around the village and preliminary surface explorations have only recently started.) and finally of Lydians. Such semi-legendary figures like the local ruler Tantalus, his son Pelops, his daughter Niobe, the departure of a sizable part of the region's population from their shores to found, according to one account, the future Etruscan civilization in present-day Italy, are all centered around Mount Sipylus, where the first urban settlement was probably located, and date from the period prior to the emergence of the Lydian Mermnad dynasty. It has also been suggested that the mountain could be the geographical setting for Baucis and Philemon tale as well, while most sources still usually associate it with Tyana (Hittite Tuwanuwa) in modern-day Kemerhisar near Niğde.

In the early 7th century BC, the Lydians under the newly established Mermnad dynasty, with the present-day Manisa region as their heartland expanded their control over a large part of Anatolia, ruling from their capital "Sfard" (Sard, Sardes, Sardis) situated more inland at a distance of 62 km (39 mi) from Manisa. The vestiges from their capital which reached our day bring together remains from several successive civilizations.

=== Classical Age ===
==== Hellenistic, Roman and Byzantine periods ====
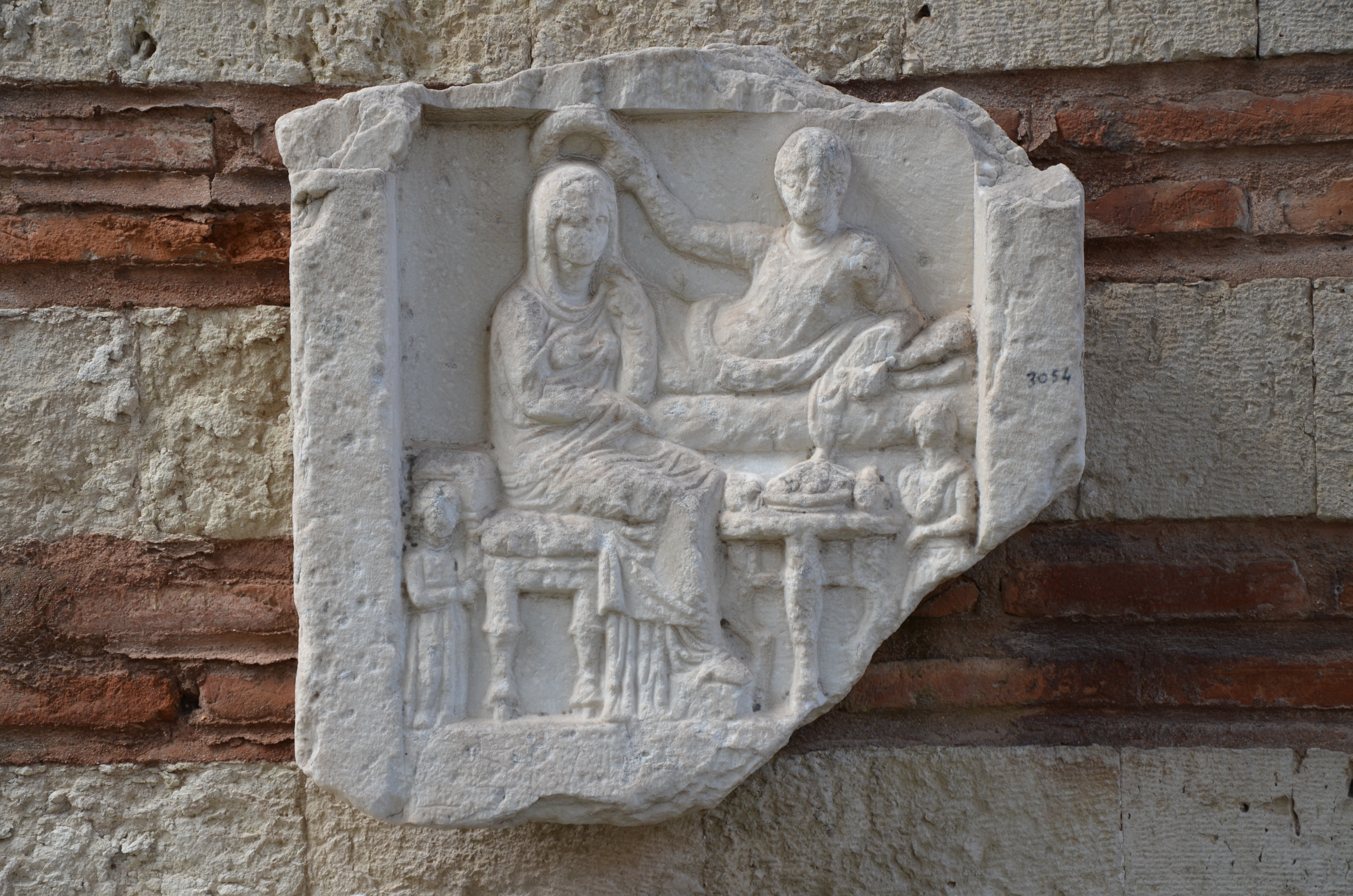
Roman artifacts in Archaeological Museum of Manisa

In classical antiquity, Romans knew the city as Magnesia ad Sipylum. There, in 190 BC, forces of the Roman Republic defeated the Seleucid king Antiochus the Great in the Battle of Magnesia. Magnesia ad Sipylum became a city of importance under Roman rule, and though nearly destroyed by an earthquake in the reign of Tiberius (Roman Emperor from 14 AD to 37 AD), was restored by that emperor and flourished through the period of the Roman empire.

In 1076 the Byzantine Empire lost the city to the Seljuks in the aftermath of the 1071 Battle of Manzikert. The subsequent Crusader victory at the Battle of Dorylaeum (1097) allowed the Byzantine Emperor Alexios I to recover Magnesia. It was an important regional centre under Byzantine rule, and during the 13th-century interlude of the Empire of Nicea of 1204 to 1261. Magnesia housed the Imperial mint, the Imperial treasury, and served as the functional capital of the Empire of Nicea until the recovery of Constantinople in 1261. Ruins of the Nicean-era fortifications attest to the city's importance in the Late Byzantine period, a fact also noted by the Byzantine historian George Akropolites, writing in the 13th century. The city prospered under the Laskaris and its warehouses and depots received goods from as far as Egypt and India through the Italian city-states.

In the late 13th and early 14th centuries the region of Magnesia was subject to repeated raids by invading Turkish bands. After a failed campaign in 1302 by then co-emperor Michael IX and his unsuccessful defence of the city, most inhabitants fled to the Aegean coast and the European part of the Byzantine Empire. At least 100 refugees were killed by the Turks on their way to neighbouring Pergamon. As a result of the Turkish invasion of the region, and the destruction of the city, the area became largely desolate.

=== Turkish era (Seljuk, Saruhan and early Ottoman periods) ===
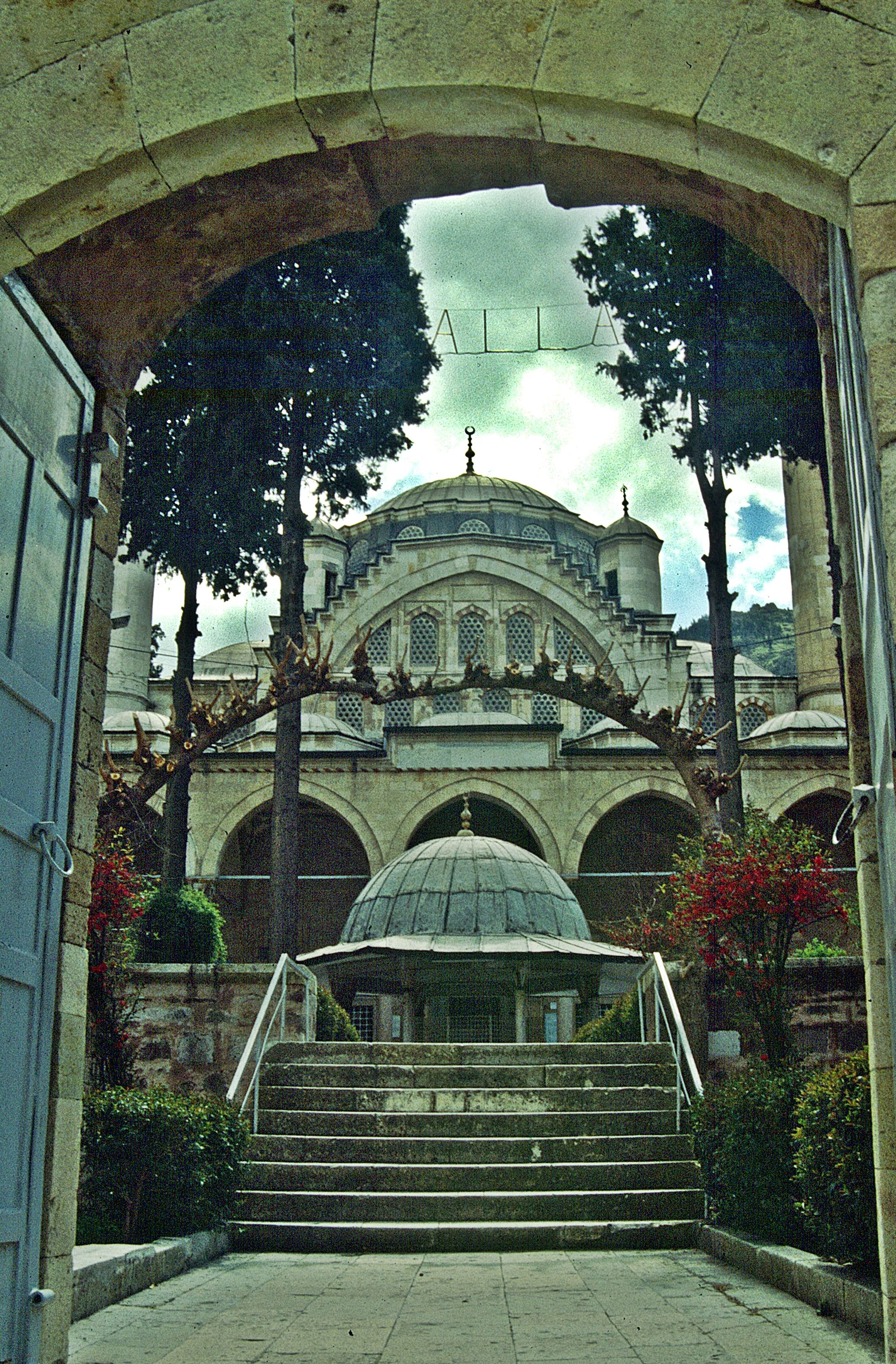
Muradiye Mosque (Manisa), designed by the imperial architect Mimar Sinan

Historical population
| Year | Pop. | ±% |
|---|---|---|
| 1531 | 6,500 | — |
| 1575 | 8,250 | +26.9% |
| 1911 | 35,000 | +324.2% |
| 1927 | 28,328 | −19.1% |
| 1935 | 36,431 | +28.6% |
| 1960 | 77,464 | +112.6% |
| 1980 | 111,228 | +43.6% |
| 2000 | 149,151 | +34.1% |

Soon after the destruction and abandonment of the area following the constant Turkish raids, Manisa fell to the Beylik of Saruhan in 1313, led by the Bey of the same name who had started out as a tributary of the Seljuks and who reigned until 1346. His sons held the region until 1390, when the first incorporation of their lands into the expanding Ottoman state took place. After a brief interval caused by the Ottoman interregnum after the Battle of Ankara, Manisa and its surroundings became part of the Ottoman Empire in 1410.

Even during the 15th century Manisa was recorded as being in complete ruins due to the previous Turkish raids. As the central town of the Ottoman Empire's Saruhan sanjak, the city became the training ground for shahzades and slowly began to recover with many examples of Ottoman architecture built. In a practice started by Murad II in 1437, fifteen members of the Ottoman dynasty, including two among the most notable, namely Mehmed II and Süleyman I, held the administration of the city and of its dependencies in seventeen near-continuous periods until 1595. Although the sanjak of Saruhan officially depended on the eyalet of Anadolu with its seat in Kütahya, a large degree of autonomy was left to the princes for them to acquire the experience of government. This practice was discontinued in 1595, largely due to the growing insecurity in the countryside, precursor of Jelali Revolts, and a violent earthquake dealt a severe blow to the Manisa region's prosperity the same year.

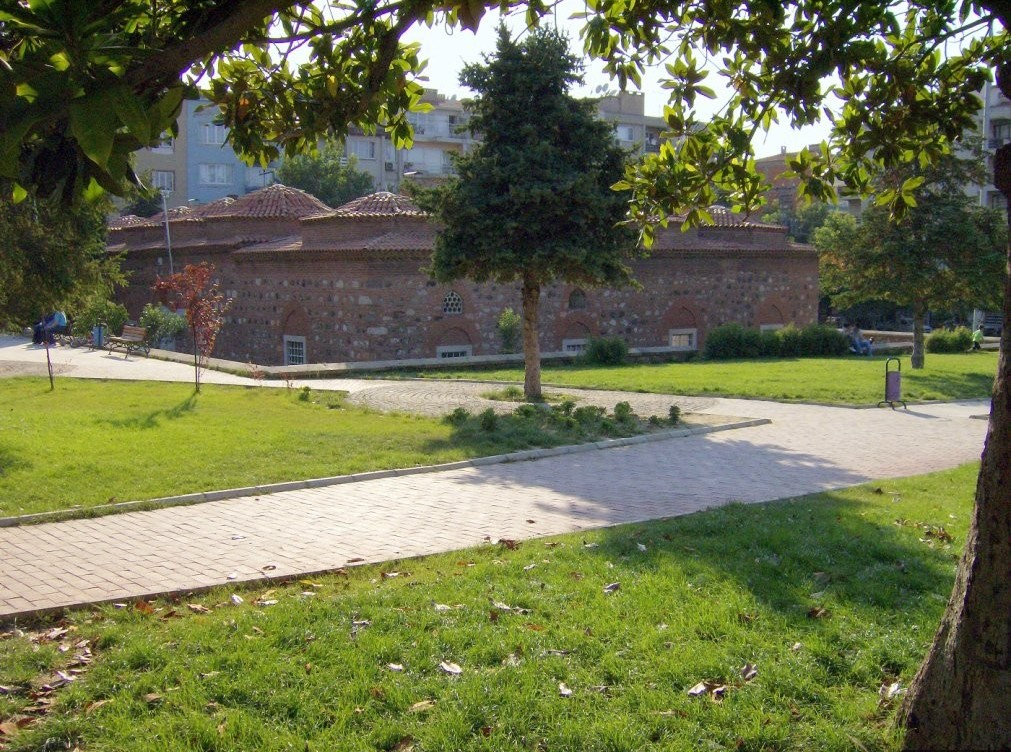
16th-century hospice and mental hospital built by Ayşe Hafsa Sultan in Manisa

Around 1700, Manisa counted about 2,000 taxpayers and 300 pious foundations (vakıf) shops, was renowned for its cotton markets and a type of leather named after the city. Large parts of the population had begun settling and becoming sedentary and the city was a point of terminus for caravans from the east, with İzmir's growth still in its early stages. But already during the preceding century, influent western merchants such as Orlando, often in pact with local warlords such as Cennetoğlu, a brigand (sometimes cited as one of the first in line in western Anatolia's long tradition of efes to come) who in the 1620s had assembled a vast company of disbanded Ottoman soldiers and renegades and established control over much of the fertile land around Manisa, had triggered a movement of more commercially sensitive Greek and Jewish populations towards the port city.

=== Late-Ottoman Manisa ===
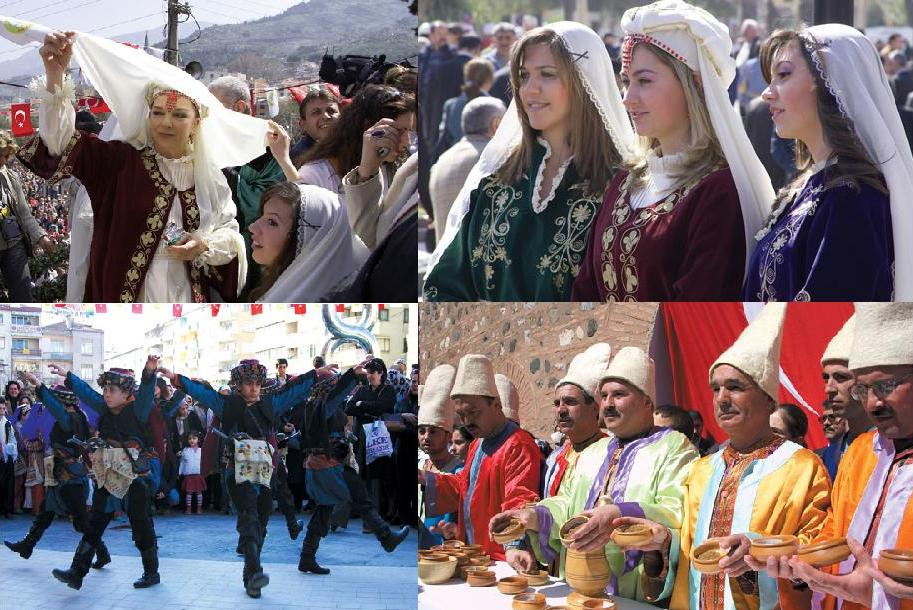
Scenes from 2010 Mesir Paste Festival (Mesir Macunu Festivali). Ayşe Hafsa Sultan and Merkez Efendi (top left) are incarnated each year by a renowned actress and actor.

Between 1595 and 1836, the sanjak of Saruhan (Manisa) remained attached to the Eyalet of Anadolu, as in the time of the Ottoman crown princes. Between 1836 and 1867 the city and its depending region was made part of the short-lived Eyalet of Aydın, which became a vilayet with the administrative reforms of 1867. During this phase, Saruhan (Manisa) even had an eyalet of its own under its name as the "Eyalet of Saruhan" between the even shorter period 1845–1847. The seat of the province to which Saruhan sanjak depended was the city of Aydın (1827–1841 and 1843–1846) at first, and was later moved to Smyrna (1841–1843, 1846–1864).

Manisa was one of the first cities in the Ottoman Empire to benefit from the arrival of a railway line, with the 93 km (58 mi) Smyrna Cassaba Railway, whose construction was started from Smyrna in 1863 and which reached its first terminus at Manisa's depending Kasaba in 1866. This railway was the third started within the territory of the Ottoman Empire at the time and the first finished within the present-day territory of Turkey. (Note: A short line built in Dobruja (now in Romania) was started and finished earlier, and İzmir-Aydın railway was started earlier in 1856 but finished a year after Smyrna Cassaba Railway in 1867.) Instead of being laid along the direct route eastwards from Smyrna to Kasaba, about fifty kilometers in length, the line built drew a wide arc advancing first to the north-west from İzmir, through its Karşıyaka suburb to whose foundation it contributed greatly, and curves eastwards only from Menemen on, crossing the former sanjak and the present-day province center of Manisa to join Kasaba (now Turgutlu) from the north. The first concession under the name was granted to a locally based English entrepreneur named Edward Price, who founded the company and built the line. This railway was extended further east by the same company between 1872 and 1875 to reach Alaşehir at a distance of 76 km (47 mi) from Kasaba and a connection northwards starting from Manisa itself was built between 1888 and 1890 to reach the lignite-rich Soma, another dependency of Manisa, through a 92 km (57 mi) line. Price sold the whole network in 1893 to the Franco-Belgian group Compagnie Internationale des Wagons-Lits, which extended it further east to Afyonkarahisar in 1896 and further north to Bandırma in 1912. The line was nationalized in 1934 by the young Republic of Turkey in the frame of a general move started in the 1920s regarding Turkey's railways.

=== 20th century ===
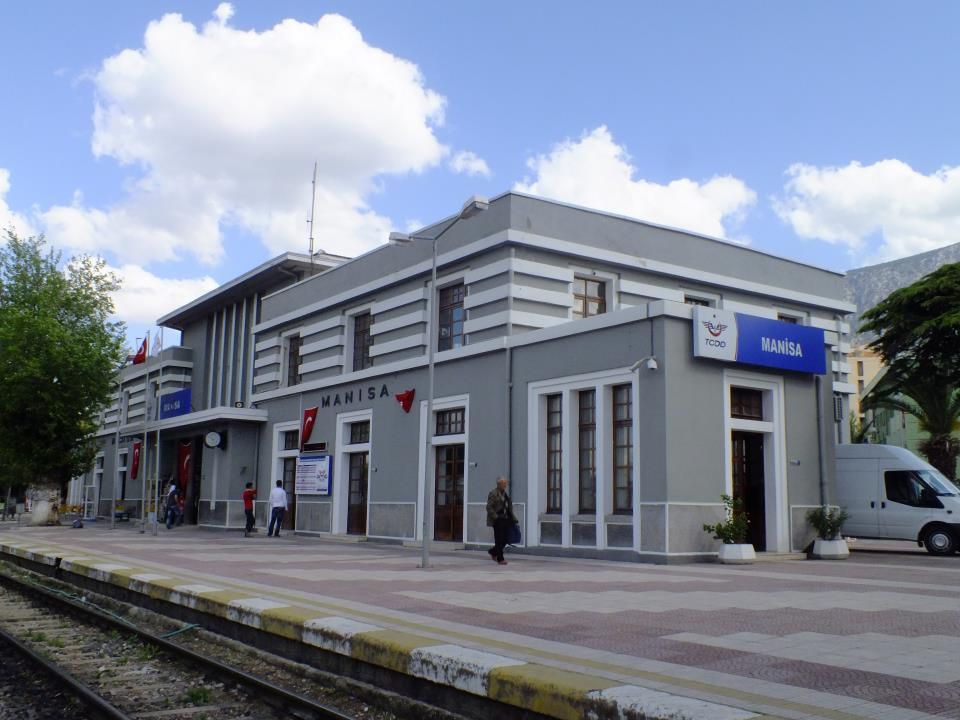
Manisa train station

After the Young Turk Revolution (1908), the local Greek community was subject to wide scale boycott, as noted by the local British ambassador. Manisa was temporarily occupied by the Greek Army on May 26, 1919, during the Greco-Turkish War (1919-1922), before finally being recaptured by the Turkish Army on September 8, 1922. The retreating Greek Army burned the city. Over ninety percent of Manisa was destroyed by the retreating Greek Army as part of the scorched-earth policy. James Loder Park, the U.S. Vice-Consul in Constantinople at the time, who toured much of the devastated area immediately after the Greek evacuation, described the situation in the surrounding cities and towns of Smyrna he has seen, as follows: "Magnesia...almost completely wiped out by fire...10,300 houses, 15 mosques, 2 baths, 2,278 shops, 19 hotels, 26 villas...[destroyed]." Patrick Balfour, 3rd Baron Kinross wrote: "Out of the eighteen thousand buildings in the historic holy city of Manisa, only five hundred remained."

Manisa was rebuilt and became the centre of Saruhan Province in 1923 under the new Turkish Republic. The province's name was changed to Manisa, as was the city itself, in 1927.

== Climate ==
Manisa has a Mediterranean climate (Köppen climate classification: Csa, Trewartha climate classification: Cs) with hot, dry summers and short, cool but wet winters. Summers in Manisa are hotter than its western neighbour İzmir, while winters are colder due to its inland location. Snowfall, while fairly uncommon, does accumulate most winters, with a record snow depth of 44 cm in January 1945.

Records began in 1930. The record high temperature was 45.5 °C (113.9 °F) on 25 July 2007, while the record low temperature was −17.5 °C (0.5 °F) on 4 January 1942.

Climate data for Manisa (1991–2020, extremes 1930–2023)
| Month | Jan | Feb | Mar | Apr | May | Jun | Jul | Aug | Sep | Oct | Nov | Dec | Year |
|---|---|---|---|---|---|---|---|---|---|---|---|---|---|
| Record high °C (°F) | 24.2 (75.6) | 26.4 (79.5) | 33.5 (92.3) | 34.7 (94.5) | 40.6 (105.1) | 43.4 (110.1) | 45.5 (113.9) | 44.7 (112.5) | 42.4 (108.3) | 38.2 (100.8) | 31.6 (88.9) | 26.4 (79.5) | 45.5 (113.9) |
| Mean daily maximum °C (°F) | 10.7 (51.3) | 12.9 (55.2) | 16.8 (62.2) | 21.7 (71.1) | 27.6 (81.7) | 32.7 (90.9) | 35.7 (96.3) | 35.7 (96.3) | 31.1 (88.0) | 24.8 (76.6) | 17.6 (63.7) | 12.0 (53.6) | 23.3 (73.9) |
| Daily mean °C (°F) | 6.3 (43.3) | 7.9 (46.2) | 11.0 (51.8) | 15.2 (59.4) | 20.7 (69.3) | 25.7 (78.3) | 28.6 (83.5) | 28.5 (83.3) | 23.7 (74.7) | 18.2 (64.8) | 11.9 (53.4) | 7.8 (46.0) | 17.1 (62.8) |
| Mean daily minimum °C (°F) | 3.0 (37.4) | 4.1 (39.4) | 6.1 (43.0) | 9.6 (49.3) | 14.4 (57.9) | 19.1 (66.4) | 22.2 (72.0) | 22.3 (72.1) | 17.5 (63.5) | 13.1 (55.6) | 7.7 (45.9) | 4.7 (40.5) | 12.0 (53.6) |
| Record low °C (°F) | −17.5 (0.5) | −10.9 (12.4) | −6.7 (19.9) | −2.7 (27.1) | 2.0 (35.6) | 7.4 (45.3) | 10.5 (50.9) | 8.5 (47.3) | 3.3 (37.9) | −0.9 (30.4) | −7.3 (18.9) | −9.9 (14.2) | −17.5 (0.5) |
| Average precipitation mm (inches) | 123.5 (4.86) | 108.4 (4.27) | 75.9 (2.99) | 54.9 (2.16) | 39.0 (1.54) | 25.1 (0.99) | 7.7 (0.30) | 11.2 (0.44) | 22.8 (0.90) | 53.8 (2.12) | 85.5 (3.37) | 116.8 (4.60) | 724.6 (28.53) |
| Average precipitation days | 10.53 | 10.87 | 9.17 | 8.43 | 6.87 | 3.67 | 1.07 | 0.87 | 2.57 | 5.93 | 8.5 | 11.73 | 80.2 |
| Average snowy days | 0.6 | 0.56 | 0 | 0 | 0 | 0 | 0 | 0 | 0 | 0 | 0 | 0.31 | 1.47 |
| Average relative humidity (%) | 75.6 | 71.1 | 65.1 | 60.5 | 53.9 | 47.7 | 43.2 | 45.1 | 51.1 | 62.2 | 72.4 | 77.3 | 60.4 |
| Mean monthly sunshine hours | 77.5 | 93.2 | 145.7 | 162.0 | 223.2 | 267.0 | 288.3 | 279.0 | 225.0 | 170.5 | 102.0 | 58.9 | 2,092.3 |
| Mean daily sunshine hours | 2.5 | 3.3 | 4.7 | 5.4 | 7.2 | 8.9 | 9.3 | 9.0 | 7.5 | 5.5 | 3.4 | 1.9 | 5.7 |
Source 1: Turkish State Meteorological Service
Source 2: NOAA(humidity), Meteomanz(snow days 2008-2023)

== Cuisine ==
The cuisine of Manisa is known for several types of kebabs. Manisa kebab is a type of shish kebab prepared with a combination of minced beef and lamb. It is served on chopped up pita and with grilled tomato and peppers, and onion salad. Lastly, melted butter and sumac is added on top. It may also be served with yogurt.

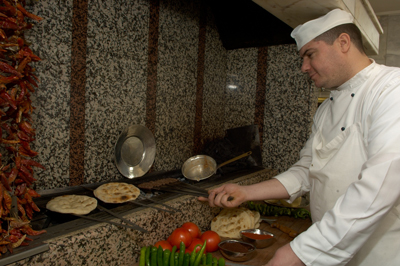
Preparation of Manisa kebab

== Health ==
Air pollution is a chronic problem here.

== Architectural landmarks ==
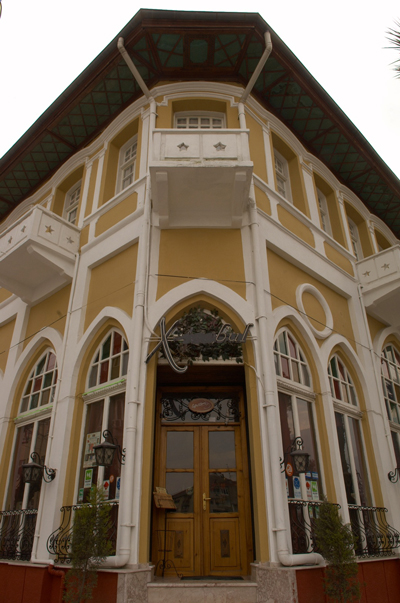
Example of civil architecture (1930s) in Manisa

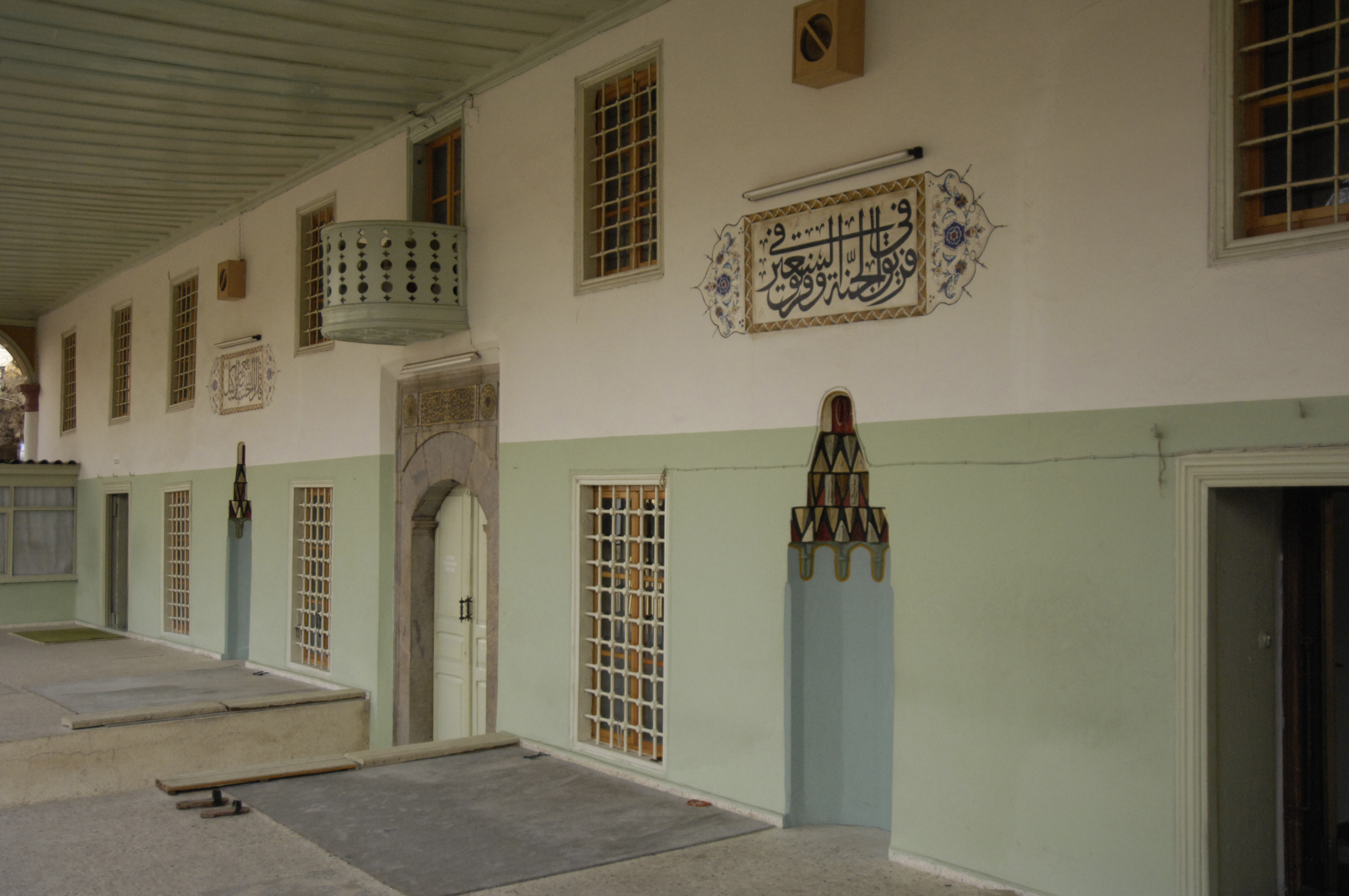
Akhisar Pasha Mosque

The 16th century Sultan Mosque was built for Ayşe Hafsa Sultan, Süleyman the Magnificent's mother. In her honor, Mesir Festival featuring the "Mesir Paste" (Turkish: Mesir Macunu), a spiced paste in the form of candy, and claimed to restore health, youth and potency, is held every year in March, in the grounds of this mosque, and is an occasion for public gathering as well as attendance by personalities of fame and prominence at national scale.

The mosque is part of a large külliye - a religious complex - among whose buildings the hospital "darüşşifa" is particularly notable. Specialized in mental diseases, the medical center was in activity until the beginning of the 20th century when new buildings were built within the same compound. That Turkey's only two institutions specialized on mental health were until recently located in İstanbul district of Bakırköy and in Manisa gave way in Turkey's public lore to gentle innuendos on the challenging spirit of the natives - Manisalı.

One such popular eccentric of the 20th century was Ahmet Bedevi, the Tarzan of Manisa or "Manisa Tarzanı", a figure who became a symbol for the city by contributing to raising consciousness for protection of the environment across Turkey and a reference especially since the 1960s when an important reforestation effort covering thousands of hectares was made in and around Manisa.

The Muradiye Mosque of the 16th century was built by the great architect Mimar Sinan (and completed by Sedefkar Mehmed Agha), and the 'Murad Bey Medresse now houses the Archaeological Museum of Manisa.

Manisa celebrates the Vintage Festival every September, when the fruits of the vineyards are celebrated. The vineyards surround the city and provide dry fruit for export from İzmir, and grapes for wine making.

== Jewish presence ==
The history of the Jews in Manisa dates back to the late 15th century, when Sephardic Jews fleeing the 1492 expulsion from Spain found refuge in the Ottoman Empire, arriving in Manisa via the Balkans. By 1531, around 500 Jews lived in the city, making it the largest Jewish community in western Anatolia at the time. During the 16th century, Jews in Manisa flourished as middle- and upper-middle-class traders, mediating between foreign merchants and local producers in goods such as cloth, wine, grains, and dried fruits. This prosperity declined by the mid-17th century, as Greek and Armenian traders displaced Jews from their economic roles.

The Jewish community experienced a resurgence in the 19th century, growing to over 2,100 people by 1914. The community then engaged in peddling, cloth merchandising, silk manufacturing, tailoring, glazing, and match-selling. The Alliance Israélite Universelle established school in the town in the late 19th century. Manisa's Jewish population declined sharply following the Greek occupation in 1919 and the subsequent destruction of Jewish and Muslim quarters by fire. Many Jews emigrated to the US (notably philanthropist Morris Shinasi), Europe, and later to Israel after 1948.

== Modern Manisa ==
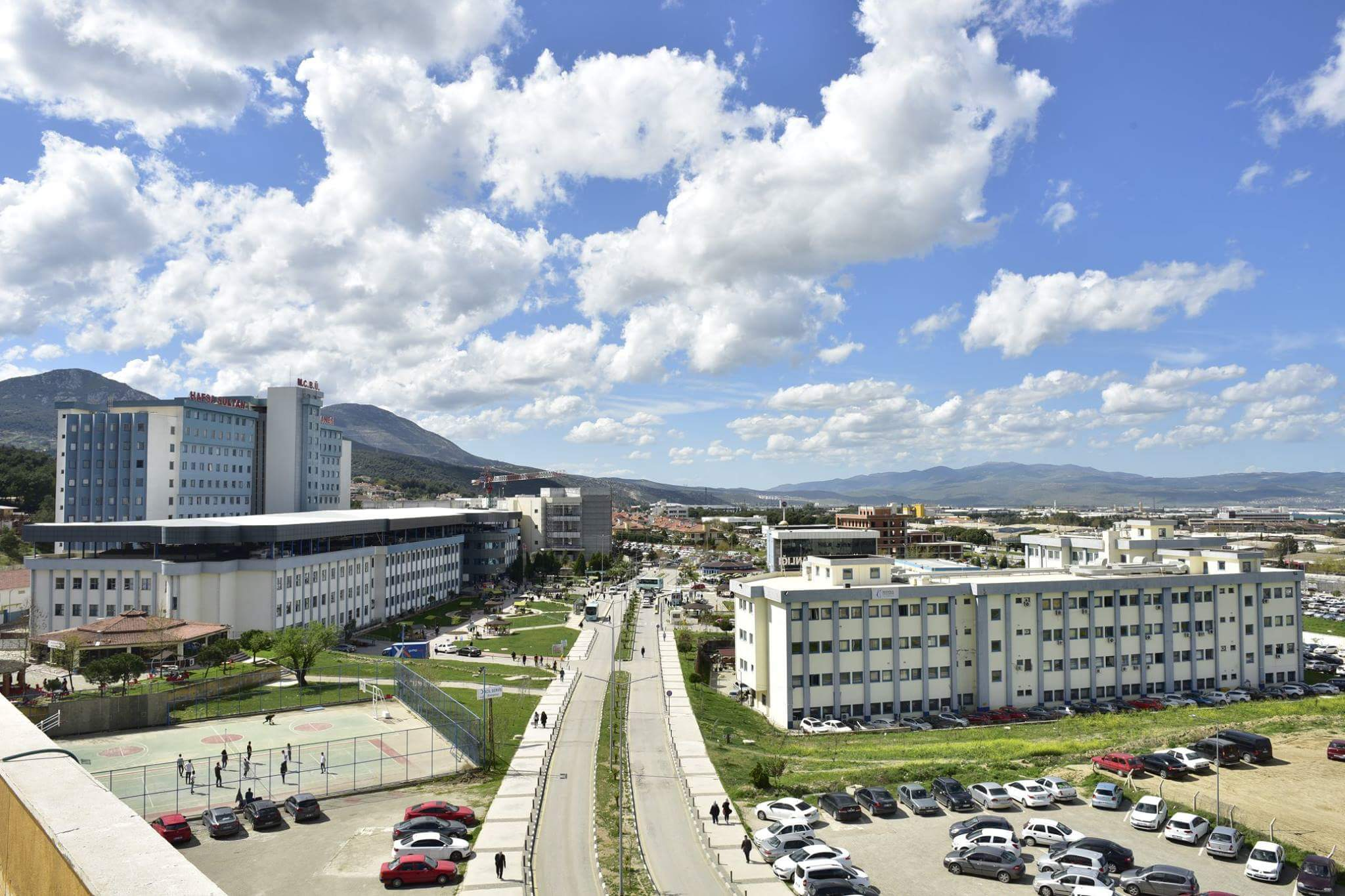
Celal Bayar University Faculty of Medicine

Manisa and some of its depending district centers have succeeded in solidly clinching an industrial production base in recent decades, in this supported both initially and continuously by the century-old wide-scale agricultural processing and related activities (production of flour and olive oil, basic textiles, leather goods, agricultural tools and instruments, cotton ginning). Olive, walnut and almond cultivation are among the important agricultural activities of Manisa.

According to the figures published by the Governorship, 694 companies in Manisa Province out of the province's total number of companies of 5,502 for 2007 are certified industrial enterprises and these employ a total of 44,449 people. Within the 694, Manisa center is in the lead with 238 enterprises engaged in industrial production, with the depending centers of Turgutlu (125 industrial enterprises), Akhisar (100), Salihli (78) closely contending, and Saruhanlı (33), Alaşehir (30), Kula (28), Demirci (20) and Soma (17) following. (Note: The counts given exclude Soma's lignite mines (10 million tonnes produced in 2007) and thermal power plant (7 billion kWh electricity production in 2007).)

Among leading industrial activities Manisa companies are engaged in are production of foodstuffs (196 companies), building materials (114), metal goods (85), as well as textile industry and clothing industry (46) and cotton ginning (43). The highest numbers of workforce are concentrated in electronics/electrical appliances, foodstuffs and construction industries.

The choice of Manisa as production base in the 1980s by the Turkish consumer electronics and white goods giant Vestel was an important boost for the present-day level of sophistication. Today Manisa's economic activities are far from being confined to a sole company. Manisa registered roughly 200m US dollars in FDI in 2004 and well-known businesses such as Italian white goods company Indesit, German electrical goods company Bosch, UK packaging company Rexam and Imperial Tobacco of the UK have invested in Manisa.

In 2004/2005 Manisa was chosen among 200 contestants as the Most Cost-Effective European city by the FDi magazine's yearly round of votes to determine European Cities and Regions of the Future, its extremely low office and industrial rents and competitive labor costs having been particularly noted. Again for 2006/2007, Manisa was named among 89 European cities as the winner of the category of the Best Economic Potential in Europe, as runner-up for the categories Southern-Europe's City of the Future (winner for Turkey) and the Most Cost-Effective European city.

The city also has a football team, Manisaspor, which plays in the Süper Lig under the home colors of red and white and away colors of black and white. Manisaspor's home ground is the Manisa 19 Mayis Stadi.

== Notable natives ==
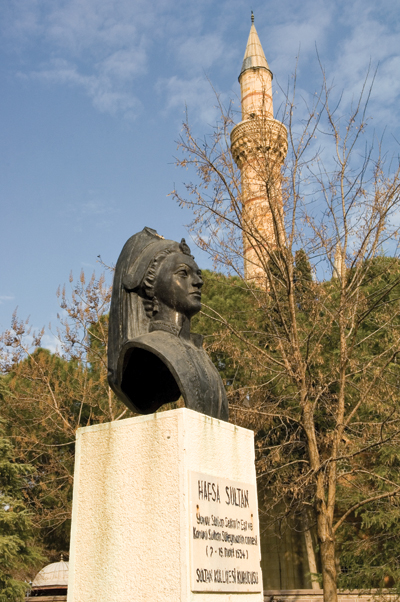
Bust in Manisa park of the Ottoman imperial consort and mother Ayşe Hafsa Sultan, builder and the initiator of the city's Mesir Festival in Manisa

=== Early period ===
- Tantalus - founder of the city of Tantalis and father of Pelops and Niobe
- Mermnad dynasty - house of Lydia which ruled an important part of Anatolia in the 7th and 6th centuries BC

=== Greco-Roman period ===
- Lazaros of Mount Galesios - 11th-century Byzantine Greek monk, stylite and saint
- Pausanias (possibly) - Greek traveller, geographer, and writer of the 2nd century AD

=== Saruhan-Ottoman period ===
- Gelenbevi Ismail Efendi - Ottoman mathematician and academic
- Gregory - Greek Orthodox metropolitan bishop of Ayvalık, executed by the Turkish Army in 1922
- Karaosmanoğlu family - dynasty of regional lords (ayan) who governed with great autonomy between mid-18th and mid-19th century from their bases in Akhisar, Manisa and İzmir and also produced notable members later such as the author Yakup Kadri Karaosmanoğlu
- Lala Mehmed Pasha - Ottoman grand vizier of the 16th century
- Saruhan dynasty - Turkish Beylik dynasty which ruled Manisa region in the 14th century
- Morris Schinasi (Turkish: Moris Şinasi; born Musa Eskenazi; 1855–1928) - Ottoman-born wealthy American businessman in the tobacco industry

=== Turkish Republic ===
- Bülent Arinç - politician, Turkish Grand National Assembly former president
- Celâl Bayar - politician, 3rd president of Turkey and Democrat Party (Turkey, 1946–1960) founder
- Kenan Evren - general, military coup leader and 7th president of Turkey
- Özgür Özel - politician, member of the Turkish Grand National Assembly
- Hilmi Özkök - general and former chief of the General Staff of Turkey

== International relations ==
In recent years, many studies have been conducted to inform the foreign public opinion. For this purpose, the website of manisahistory.com has started to be streamed within the scope of the Meeting Point of History and Civilization: Manisa project carried out by the Manisa Culture, Art and Tourism Association (MAKSAT) by the Manisa Culture, Art and Tourism Association (MAKSAT) the Meeting Point of History and Civilization: Manisa project conducted by the Manisa Culture, Art and Tourism Association (MAKSAT).

=== Twin towns – sister cities ===
Manisa is twinned with:

- Ingolstadt, Germany
- Khartoum, Sudan
- Monastir, Tunisia
- Morphou, Cyprus
- Oral, Kazakhstan
- Osh, Kyrgyzstan
- Prijedor, Bosnia and Herzegovina
- Skopje, North Macedonia
- Yiwu, China
- Höganäs, Sweden
- Forlì, Italy

== See also ==
- Mount Sipylus (Mount Spil)
- Celal Bayar University
- Vestel Manisaspor
- Sultana (grape)
- Yunusemre

== Sources ==
- Manisa (in Turkish). Governorship of Manisa. April 2007.
- George E. Bean (1967). Aegean Turkey: An archaeological guide. Ernest Benn, London. ISBN 978-0-510-03200-5.
- Rosie Ayliffe; Marc Dubin; John Gawthrop (2003). The rough guide to Turkey. Rough Guides. p. 313. ISBN 1-84353-071-6.
