= Muradiye Mosque, Manisa =

Mosque in Manisa, Turkey

Muradiye Mosque
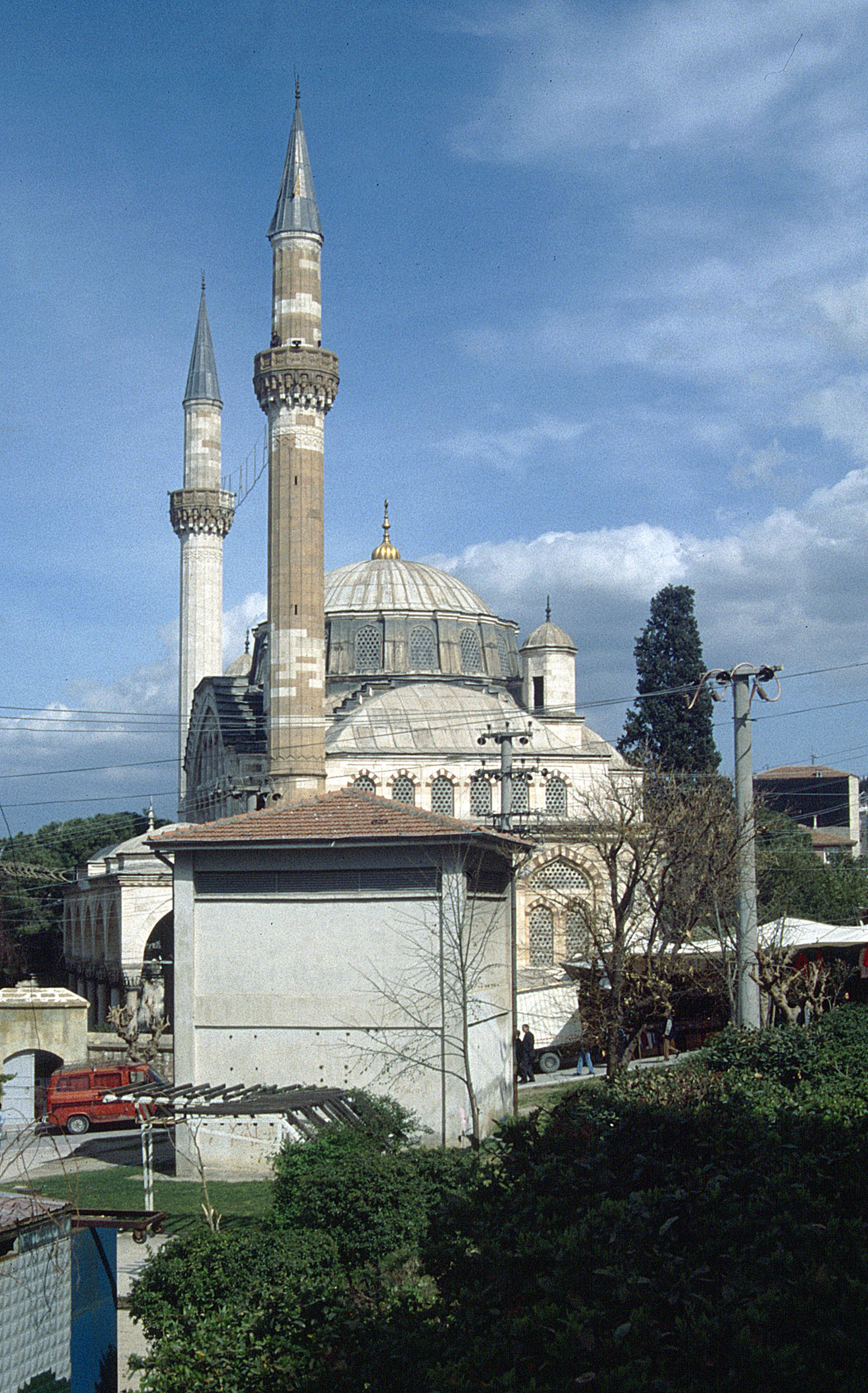

- Location within Turkey

Religion
- Affiliation: Sunni Islam

Location
- Location: Manisa, Turkey
- Coordinates: 38°36′35.6″N 27°25′44.3″E

Architecture
- Architects: Mimar Sinan, Sedefkar Mehmed Aga
- Type: Mosque
- Style: Ottoman architecture
- Groundbreaking: 1583
- Completed: 1586

Specifications
- Dome height (outer): 28.50 m (93.5 ft)
- Dome dia. (outer): 10.6 m (35 ft)
- Minaret: 2
- Minaret height: 45 m (148 ft)?

The Muradiye Mosque (Turkish: Muradiye Camii) is a 16th-century Ottoman mosque in the town of Manisa in southwest Turkey. It was commissioned by the sultan Murad III and designed by the imperial architect Mimar Sinan.

== History ==
The Muradiye Mosque in Manisa was built between 1583 and 1586 for the Ottoman sultan Murad III. It replaced an earlier small mosque on the site that had been begun in 1571 when prince Murad had been governor of Manisa. The sultanic mosque was designed by Mimar Sinan but built by the architect Mahmud Halife until his death and then from January 1586 by the architect Sedefkar Mehmed Aga who would later design the Sultan Ahmed Mosque in Istanbul. As well as tiled revetments some of the stonework was decorated by a team of painters sent from the capital. In 1584 the sultan ordered 150 Murano oil lamps from Venice. These were probably intended for the mosque. The associated madrasa and guest-house were not completed until after 1590. Neither Sinan nor Murad III visited Manisa to inspect the mosque after its completion.

== Architecture ==
The mosque is built of sandstone and has a central dome and three half-domes covering the prayer hall. The portico is covered by five smaller domes and there are two single-galleried minarets. The interior is decorated with Iznik tiles. The mosque is part of a larger complex (Külliye) consisting of a medrese (Islamic school) and imaret (public charity kitchen). Most of historic Manisa was destroyed during the Greek army retreat from the city in 1922, the mosque was one of the few buildings to survive. The imaret is now the Manisa Museum.

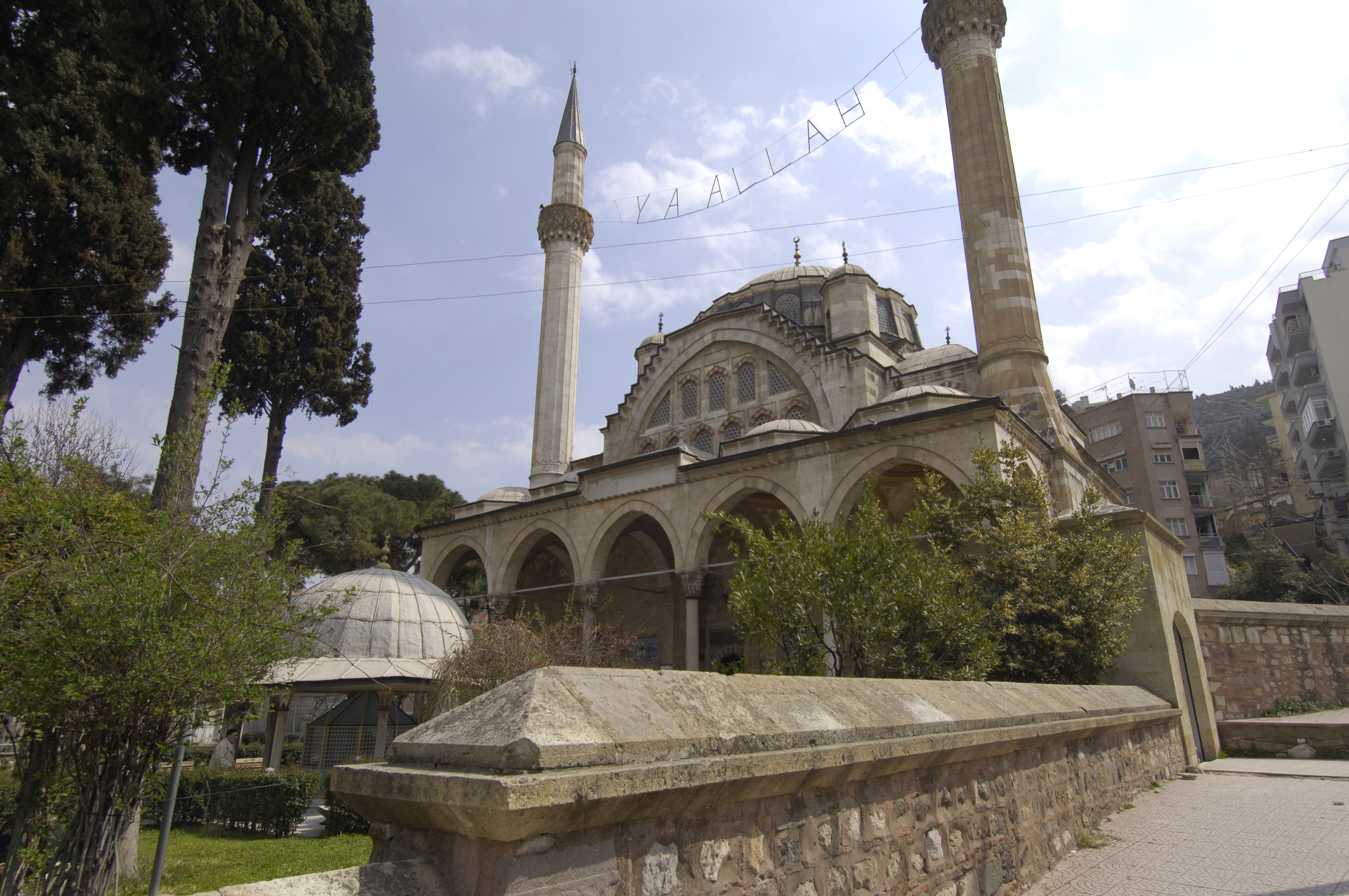
Manisa Muradiye Camii Muradiye Camii side to southwest 6124

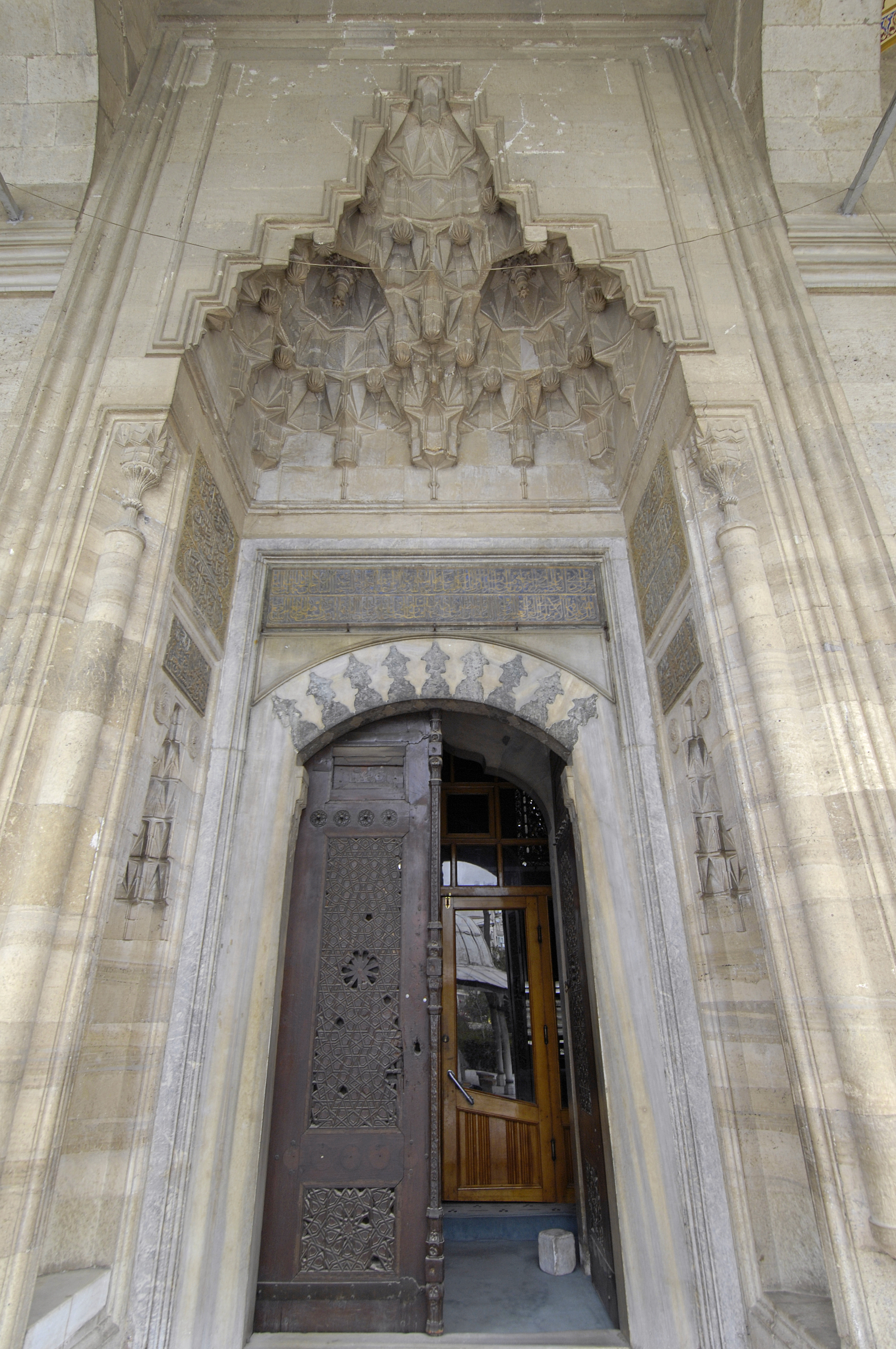
Manisa Muradiye Camii entrance 6089

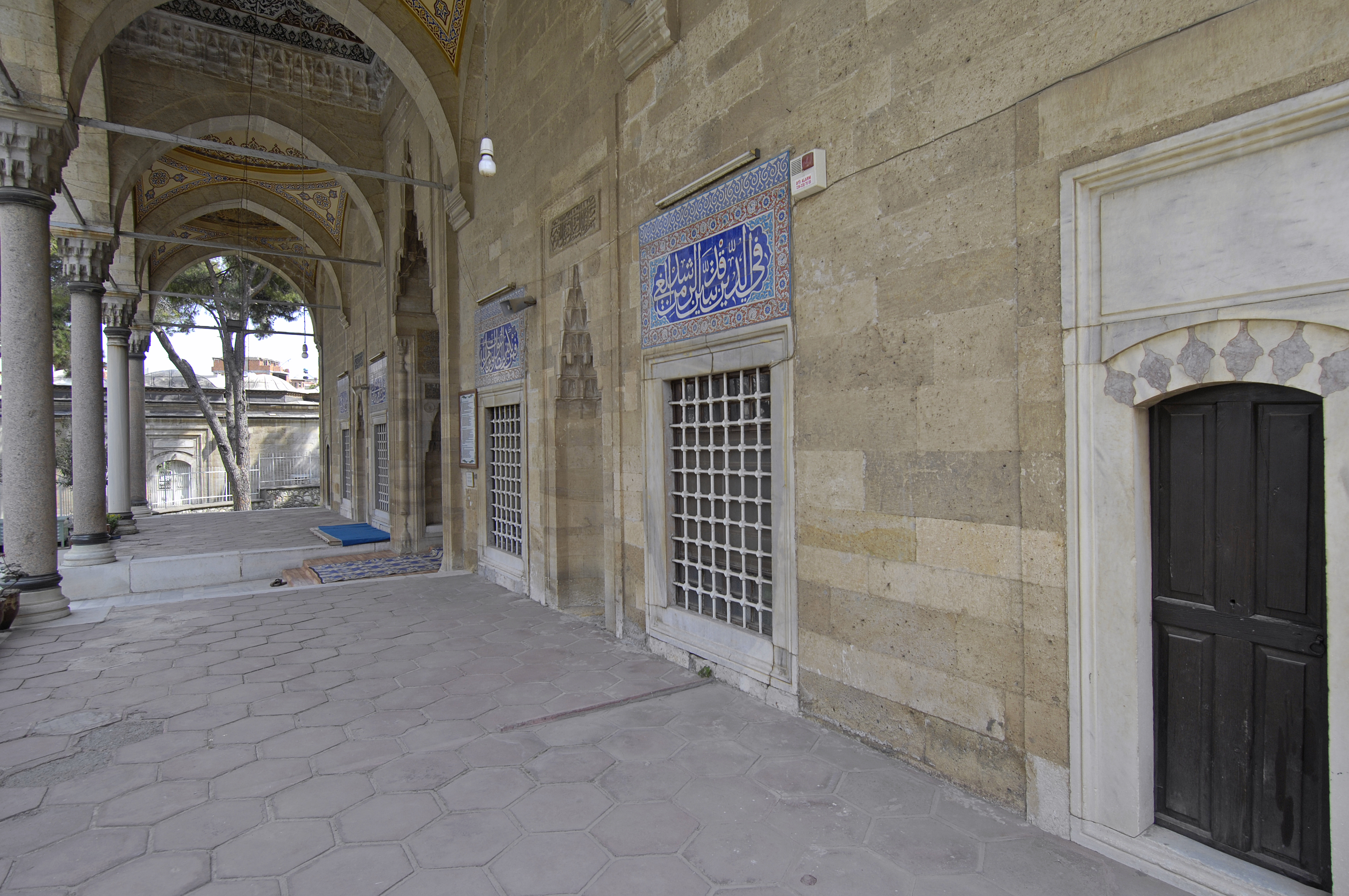
Manisa Muradiye Camii entrance side 6087

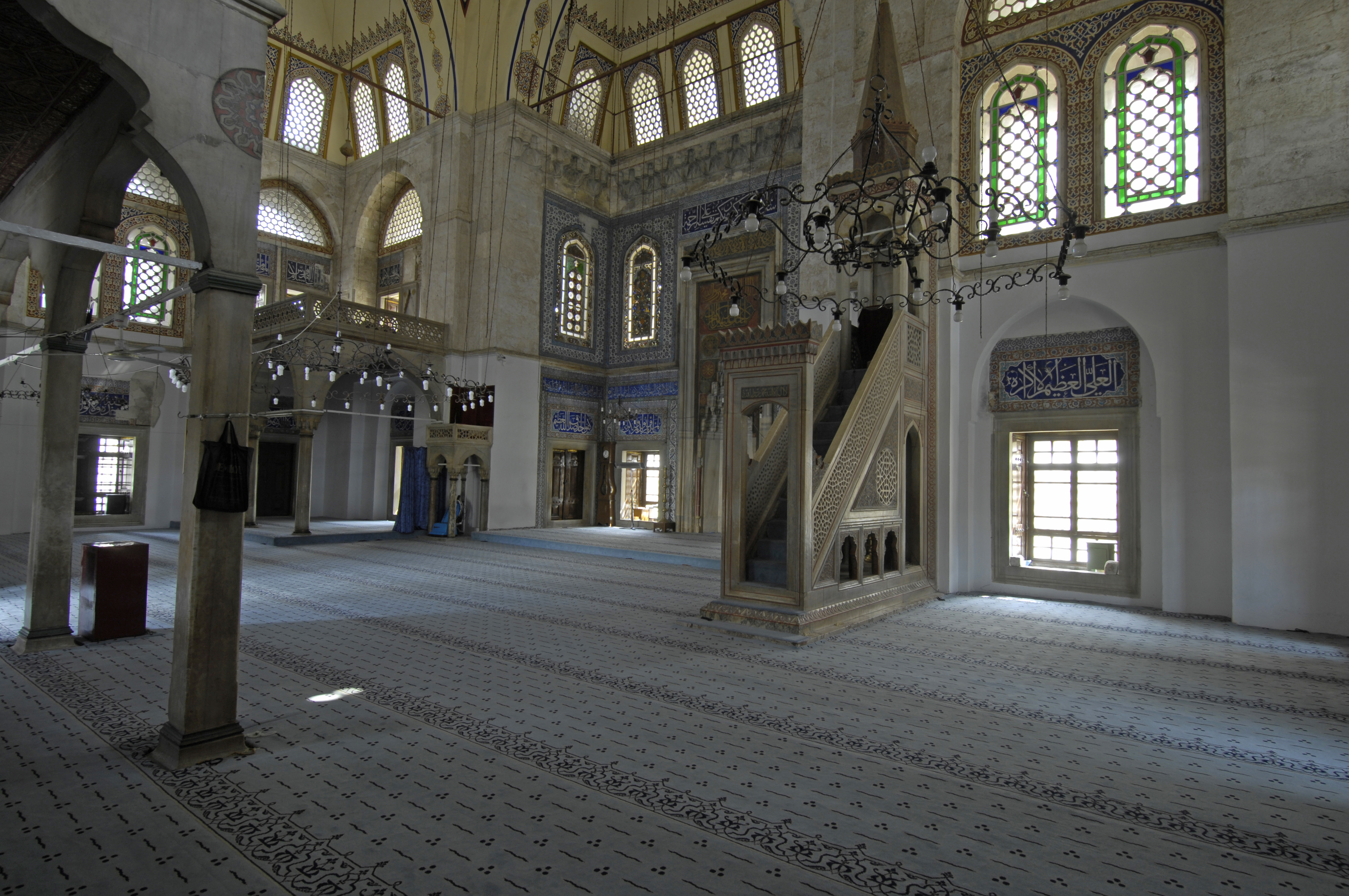
Manisa Muradiye Camii interior 6098

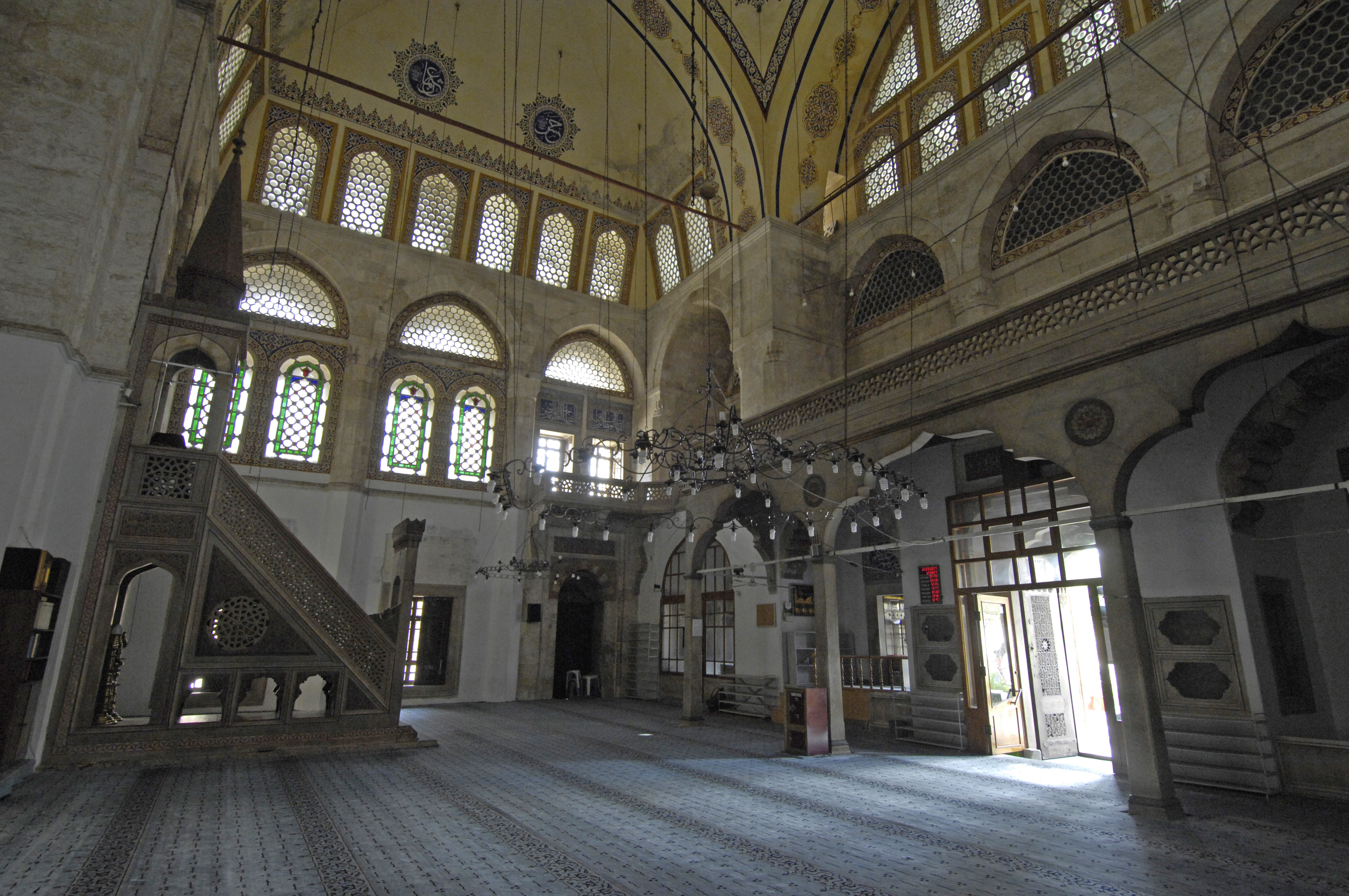
Manisa Muradiye Camii interior 6115

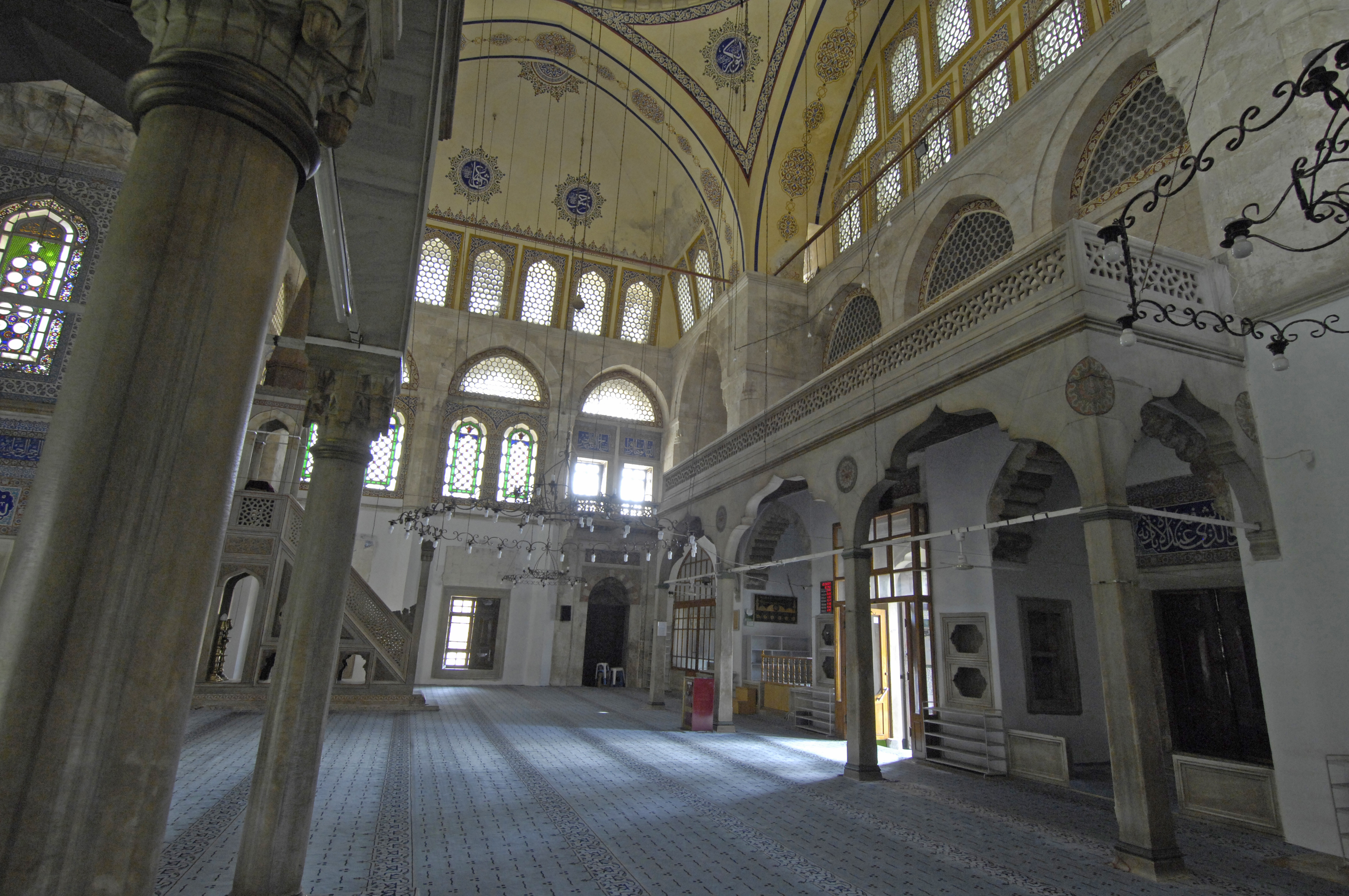
Manisa Muradiye Camii interior 6114

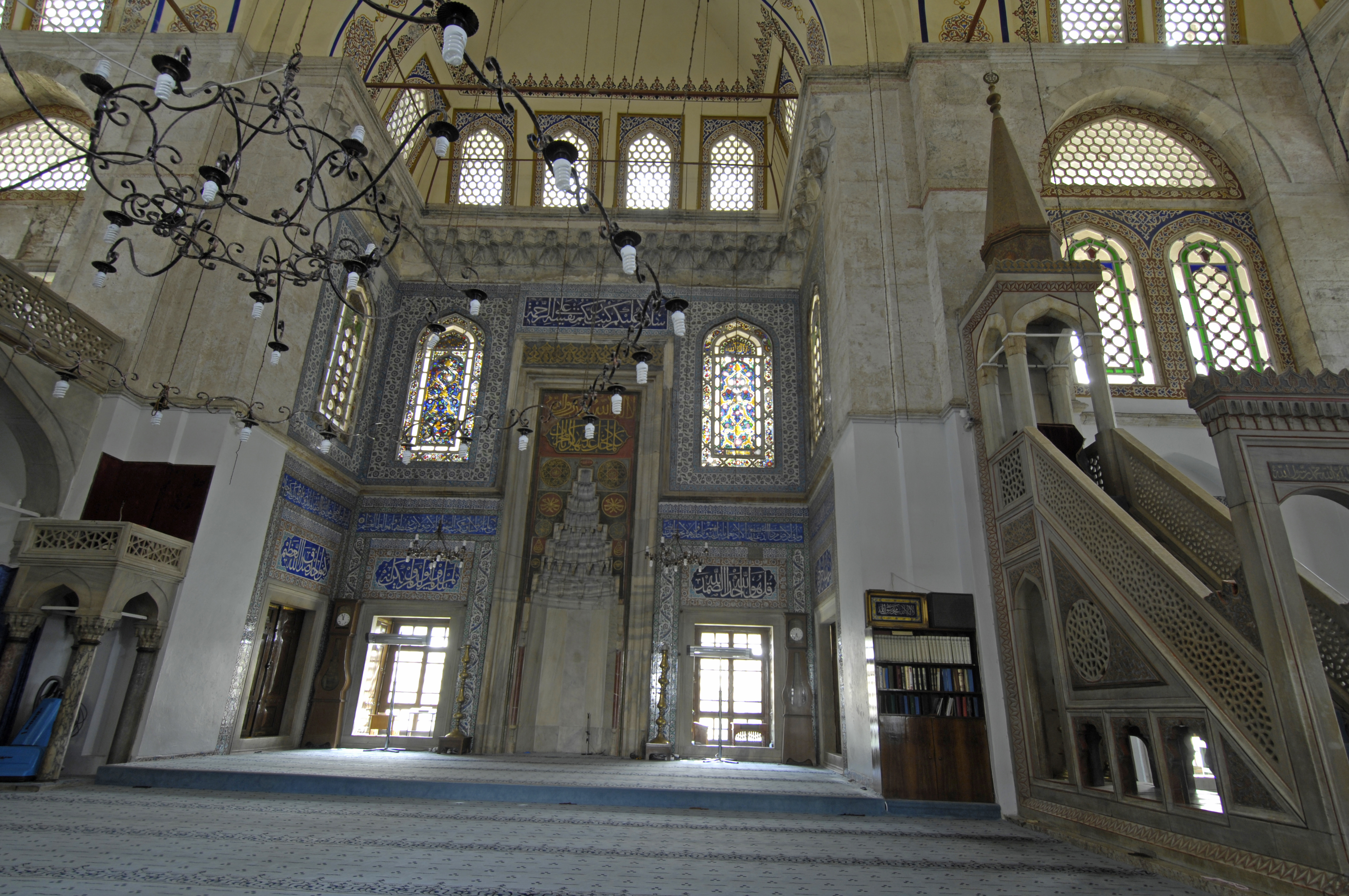
Manisa Muradiye Camii interior mihrab and minber 6093

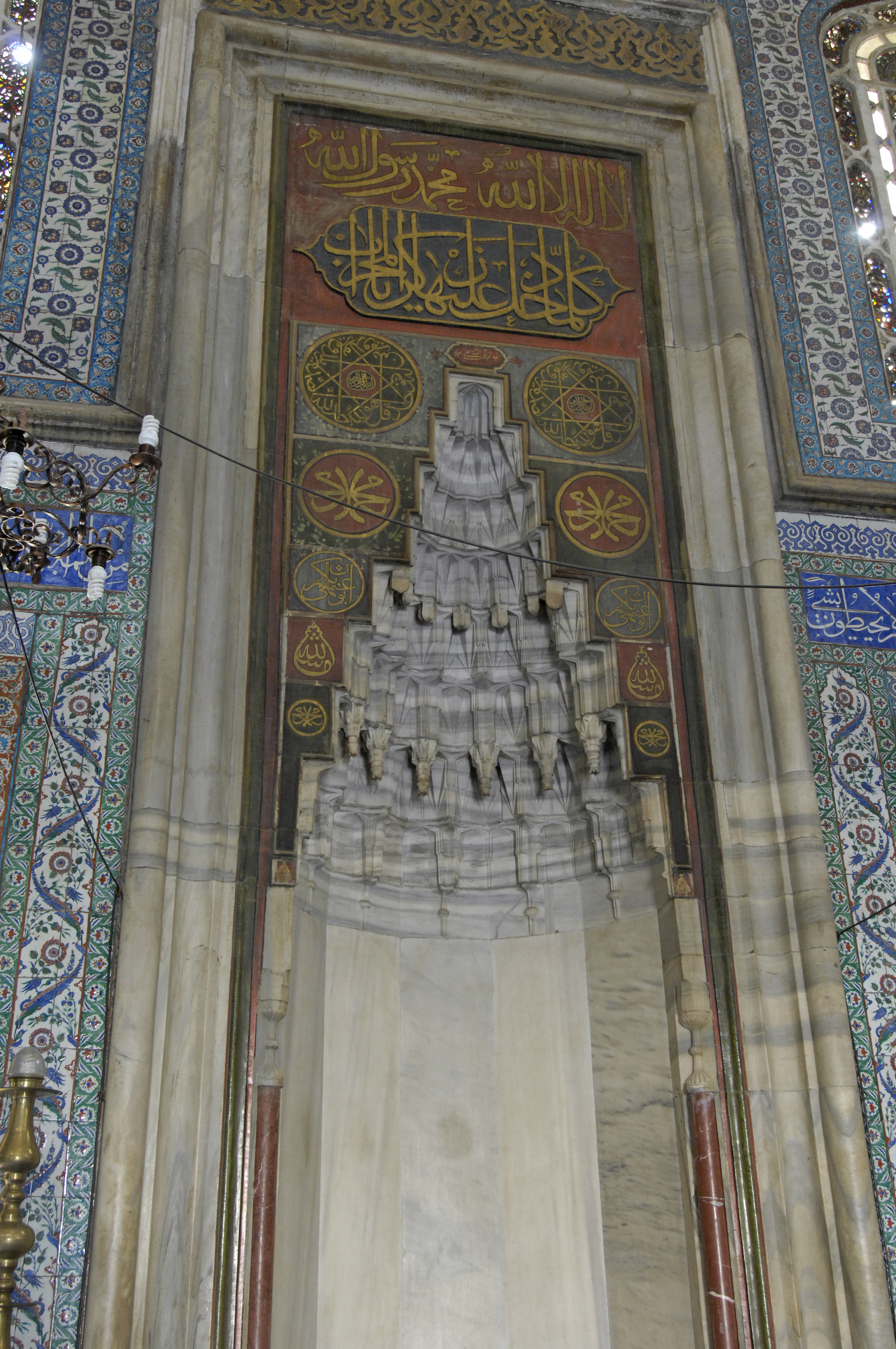
Manisa Muradiye Camii interior mihrab 6117

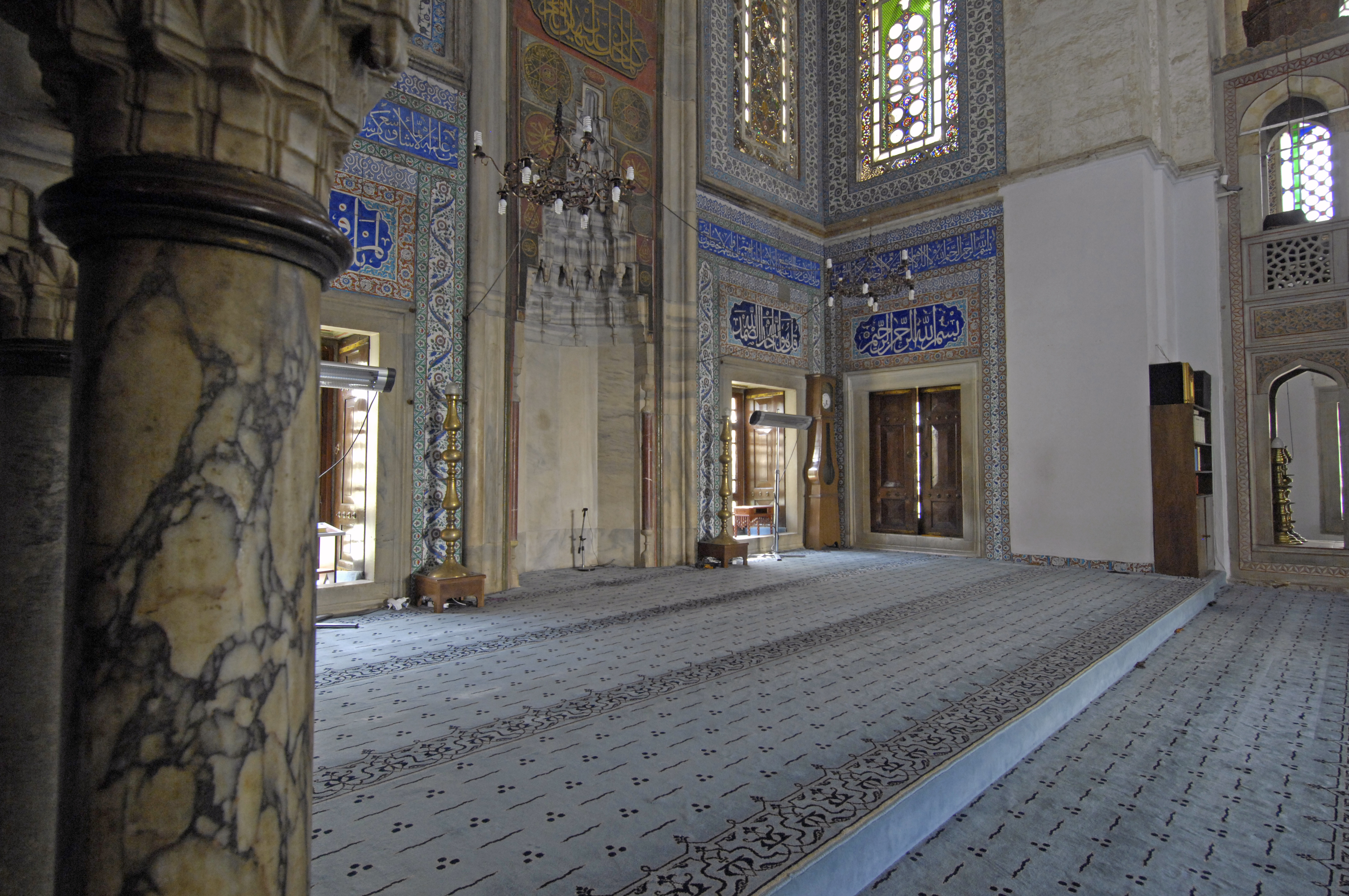
Manisa Muradiye Camii interior mihrab 6116

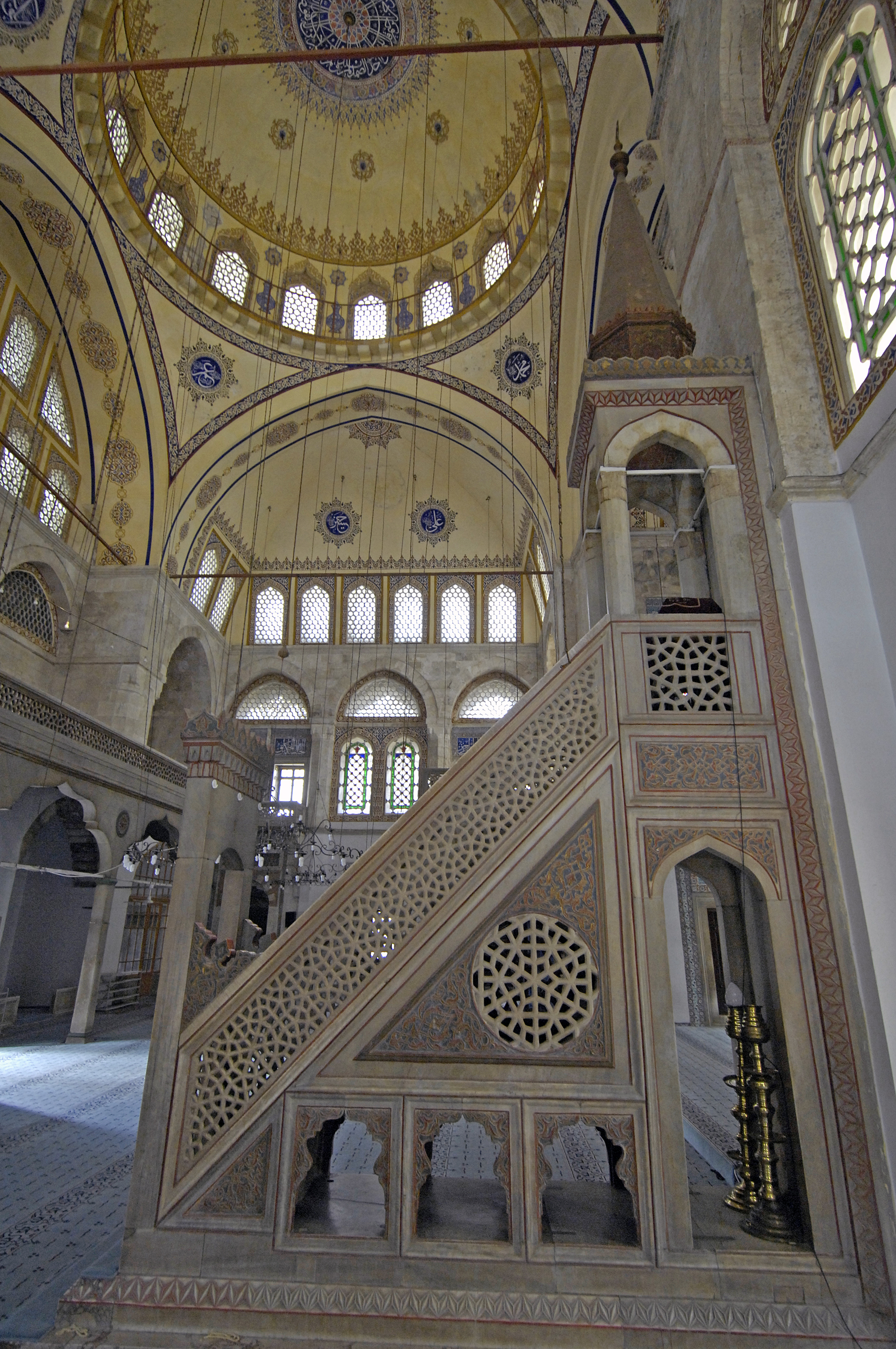
Manisa Muradiye Camii interior minber 6099

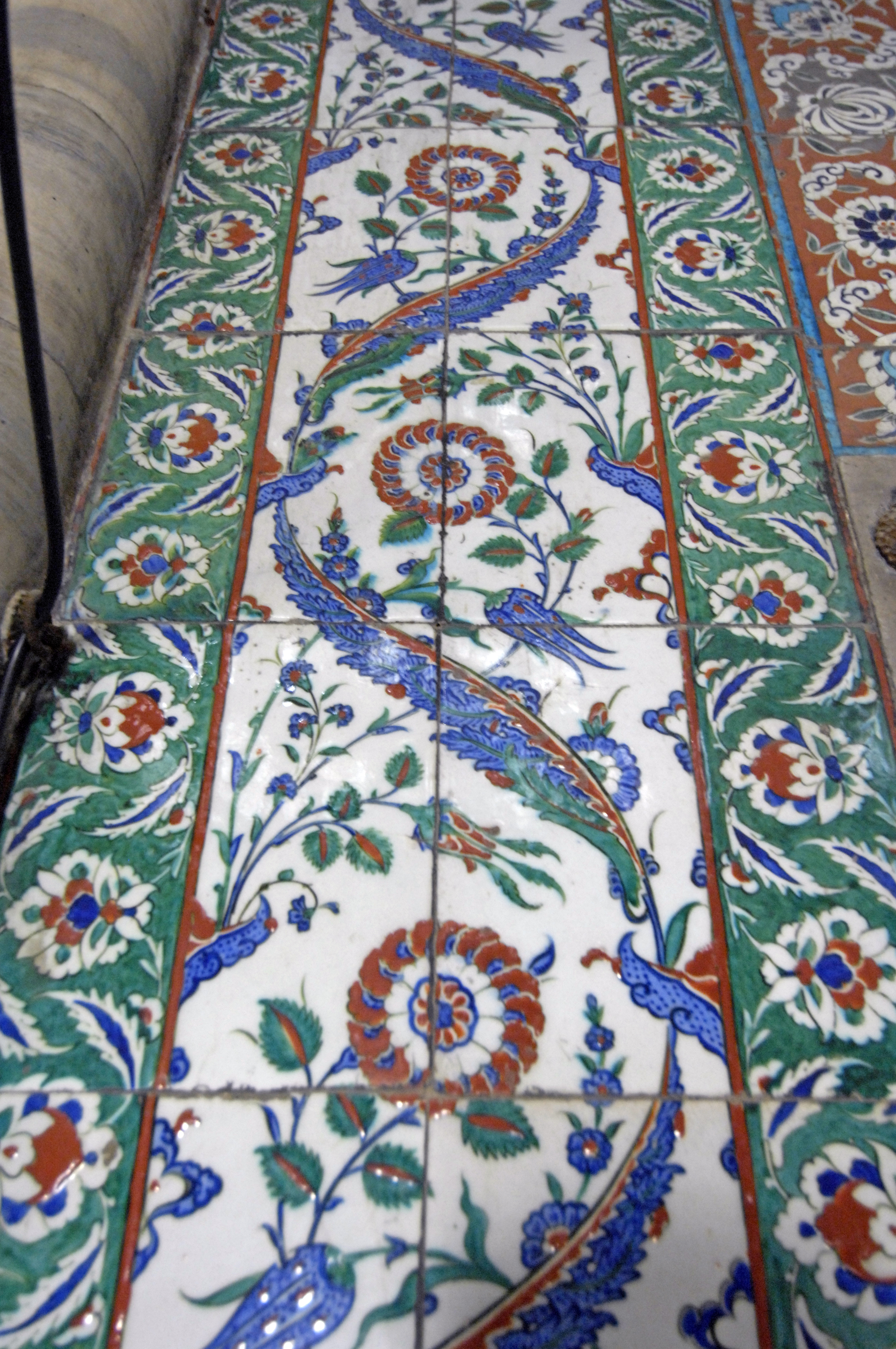
Manisa Muradiye Camii interior tiles 6102

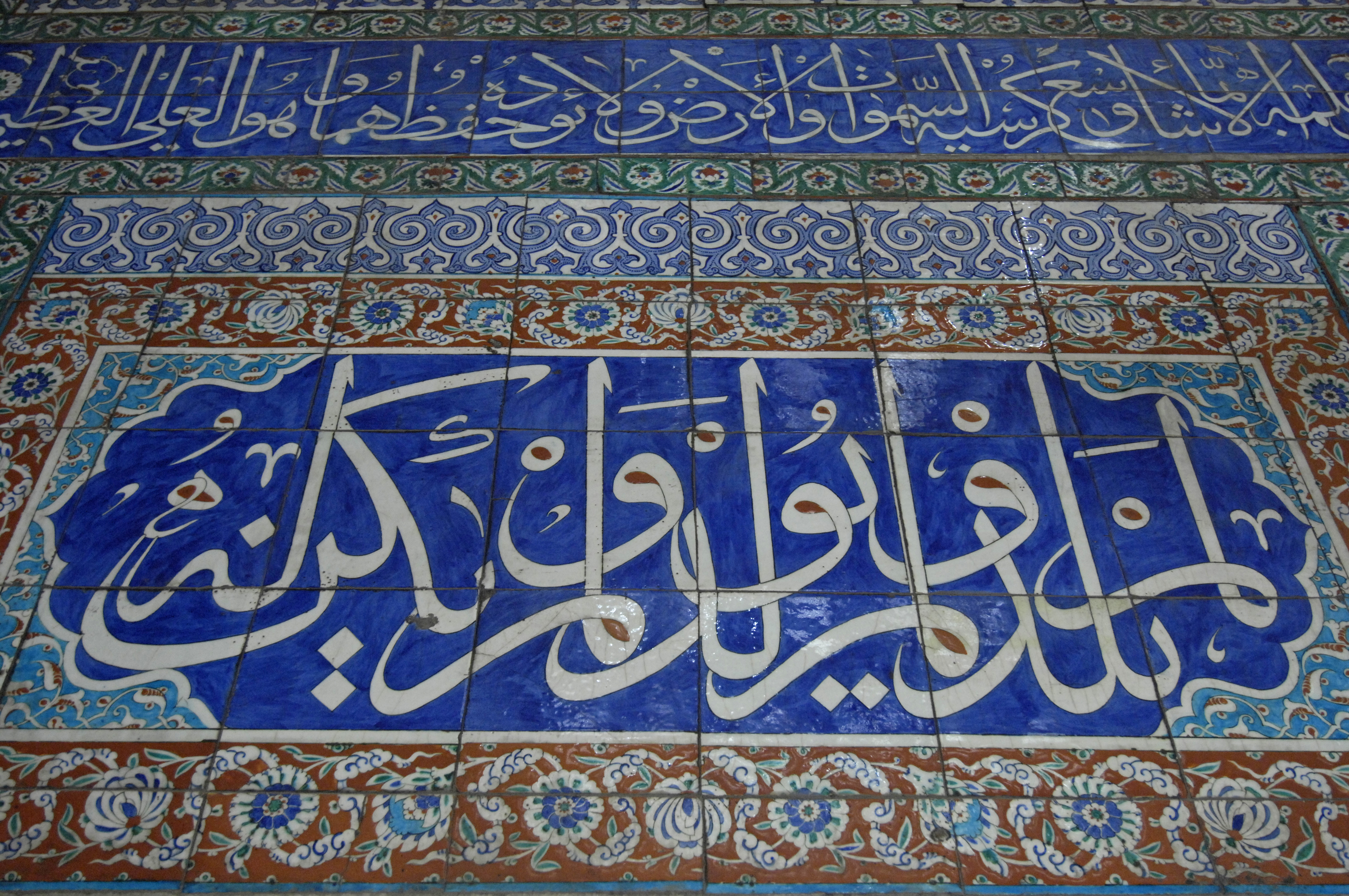
Manisa Muradiye Camii interior tiles 6111

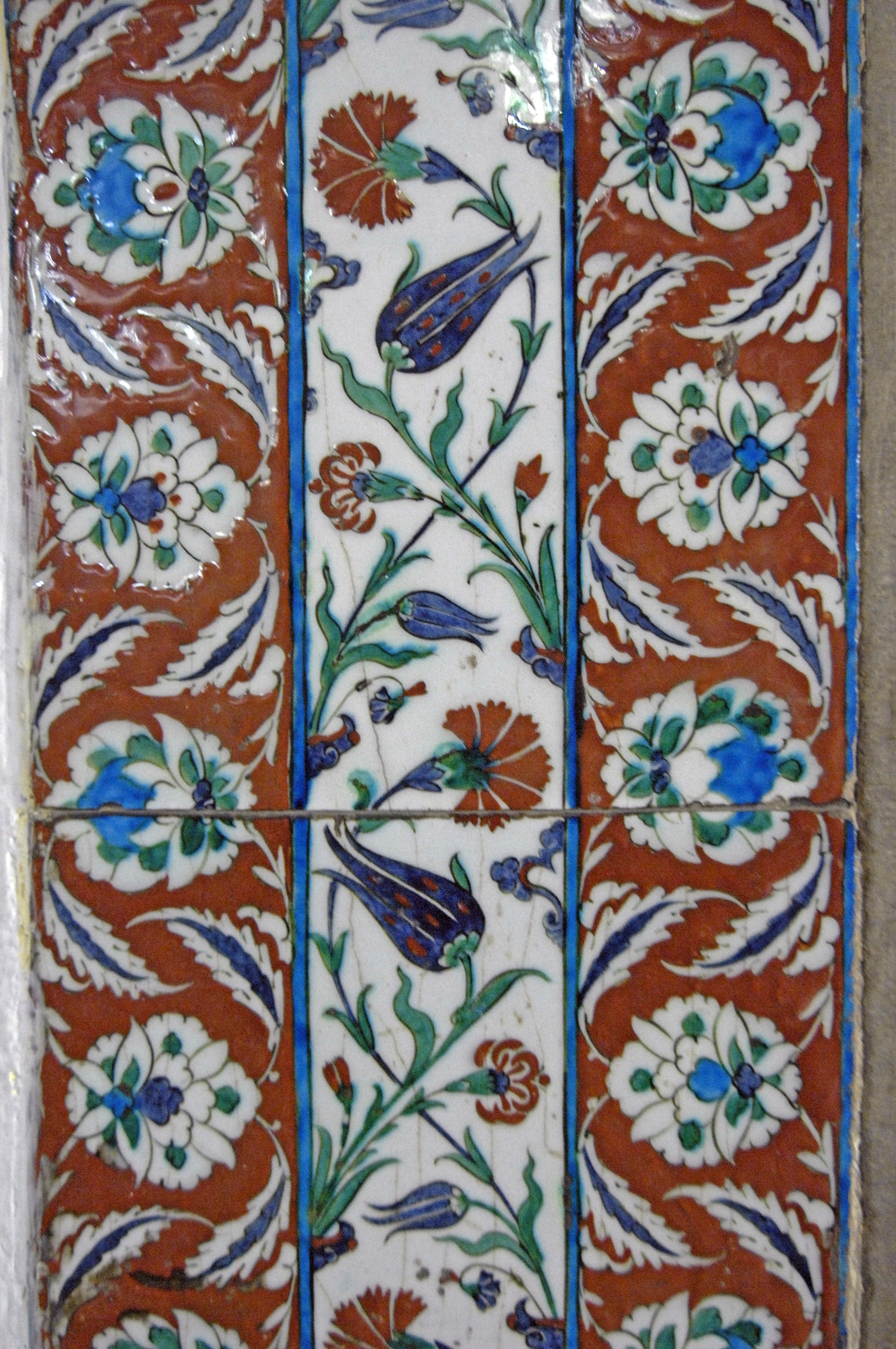
Manisa Muradiye Camii interior tiles 6106

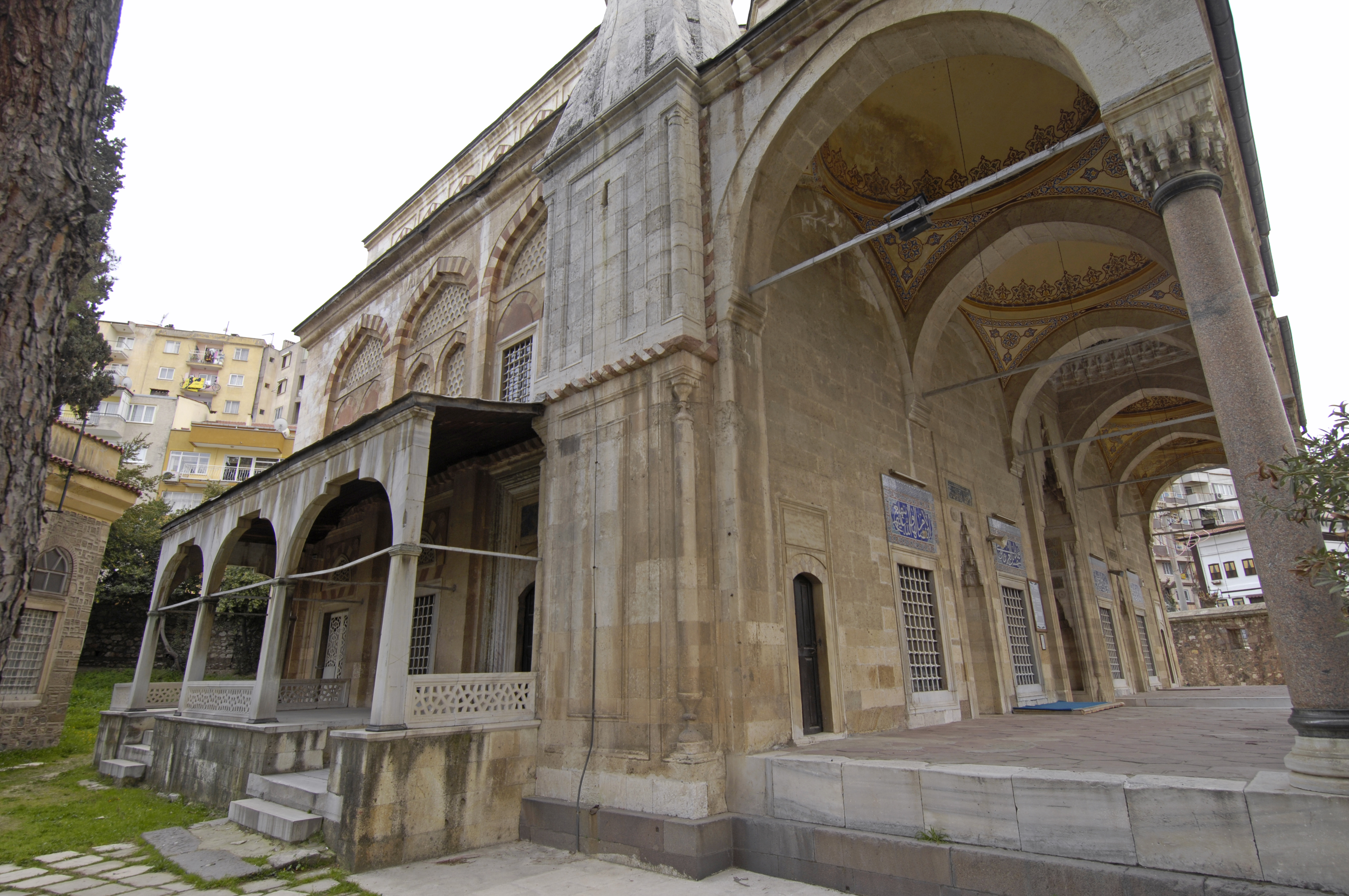
Manisa Muradiye Camii side to north 6080

== See also ==
- List of Friday mosques designed by Mimar Sinan

== Sources ==
- Necipoğlu, Gülru (2005). The Age of Sinan: Architectural Culture in the Ottoman Empire. London: Reaktion Books. ISBN 978-1-86189-253-9.
